= Frauenberg =

Frauenberg may refer to:

- Frauenberg, Rhineland-Palatinate, in Germany
- Frauenberg, Styria, in Austria
- Frauenberg, Moselle, a commune of the Moselle department in France
- Hluboká nad Vltavou, a town in South Bohemia, known as Frauenberg in German
- Frauenberg (Bavaria), a mountain near Grafenau, Bavaria, Germany
- Frauenberg (Hesse), a mountain near Marburg, Hesse, Germany
