= Wittstrauch =

Mountain in Germany

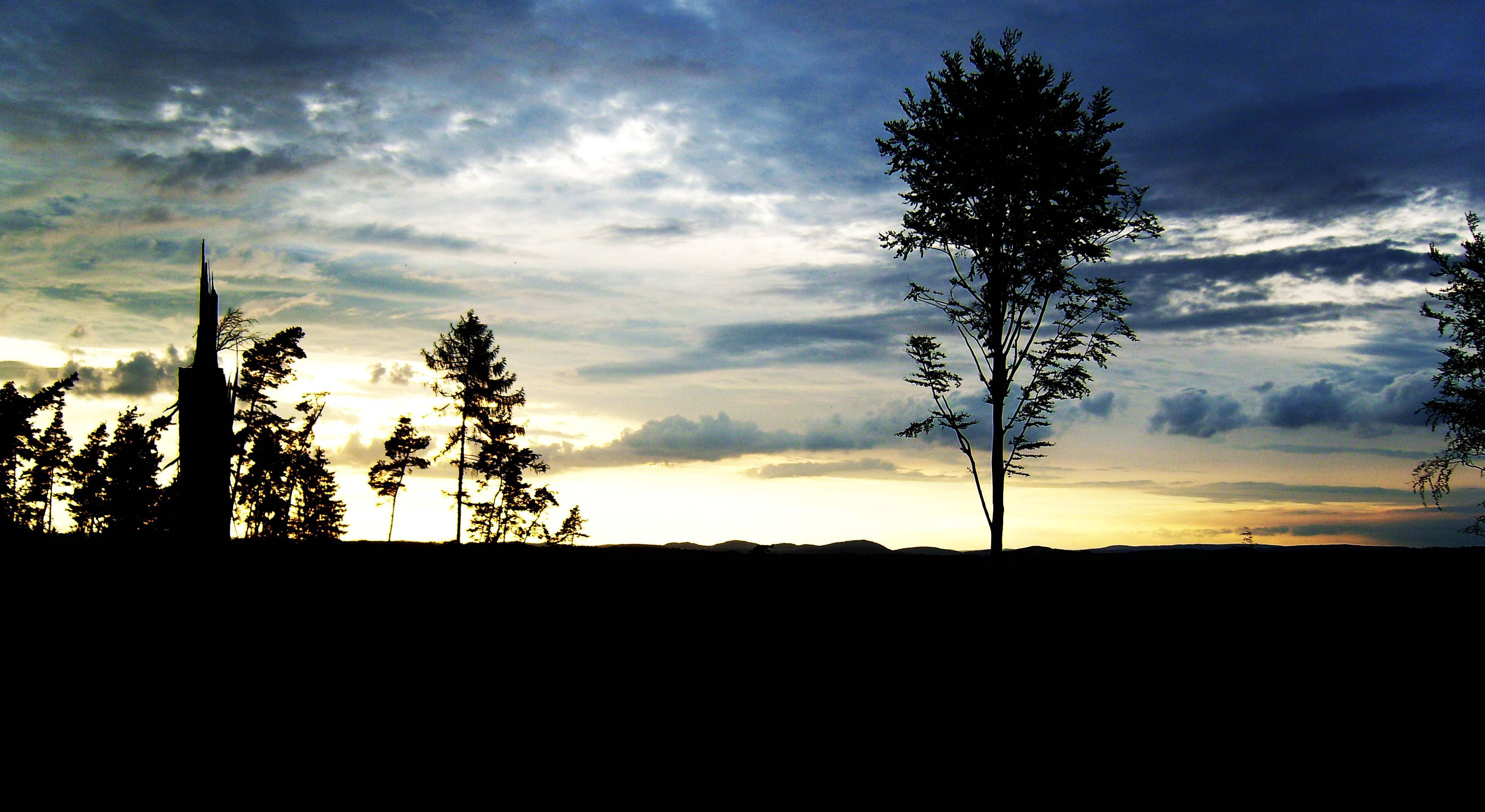
- sunset at Wittstrauch; in the farer background the Rimberg

Highest point
- Elevation: 322 m (1,056 ft)
- Coordinates: 50.765817°N 8.795796°E

Geography
- Location: Hesse, Germany

Wittstrauch is a lower summit of the Frauenberg, Hesse, Germany. Many of its trees were damaged by Kyrill in early 2007 as you can see in the photo.
