= Ohrada Zoo =

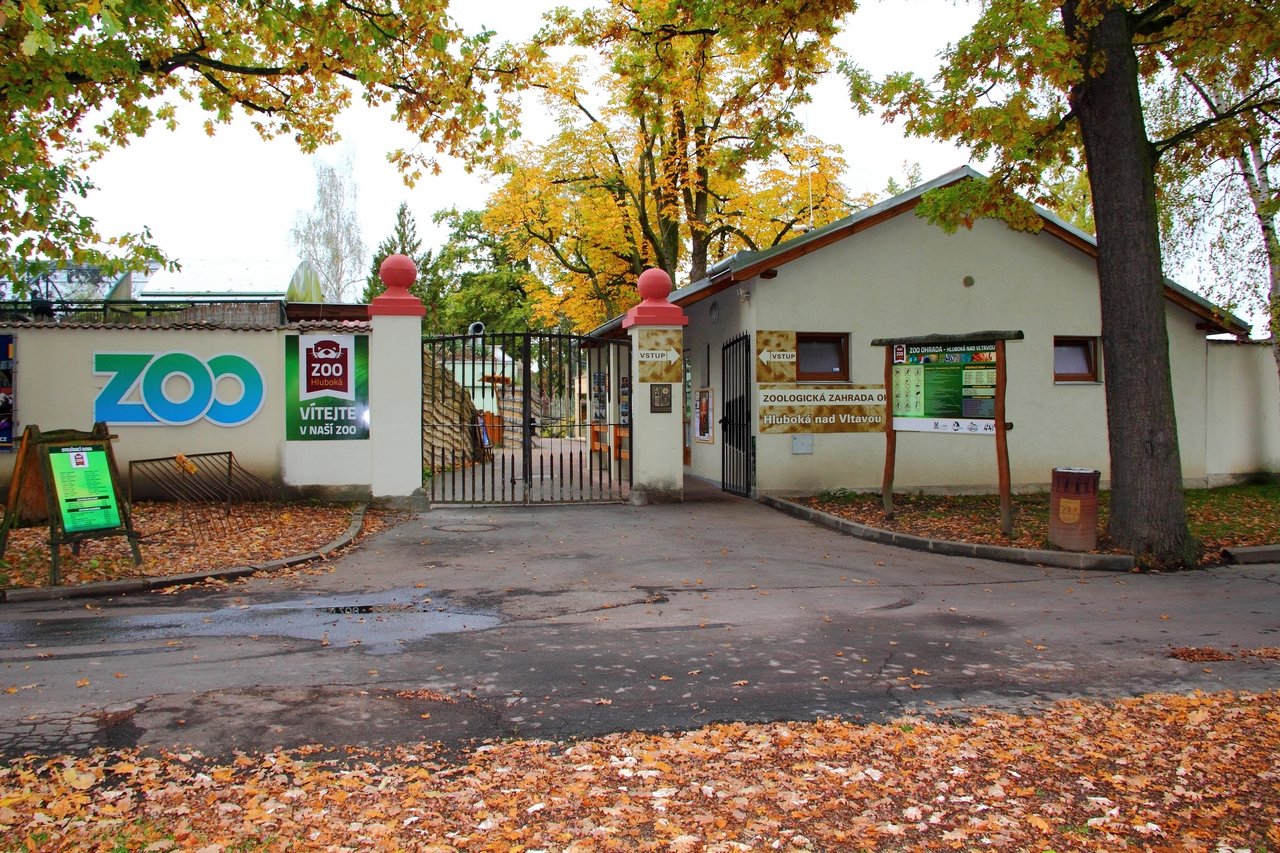
- Entrance
- Interactive map of Ohrada Zoo
- 49°2′29″N 14°25′22″E
- Date opening: 1939
- Location: Hluboká nad Vltavou
- Land area: 6 ha (4.5 ha accessible)
- No. of animals: 2,507 (2020)
- No. of species: 296 (2020)
- Memberships: (UCSZOO) Unie českých a slovenských zoologických zahrad, EAZA
- Website: www.zoohluboka.cz

South Bohemian Zoological Gardens of Hluboká nad Vltavou (Czech: Jihočeská zoologická zahrada Hluboká nad Vltavou), known as Ohrada Zoo (Czech: Zoo Hluboká) is a zoo in the town of Hluboká nad Vltavou, Czech Republic, which opened in 1939. The zoo is specialized in animals from the European Palearctic zoogeographical region, and the Czech Republic.

== Creation of the Czechoslovakian Wolfdog ==
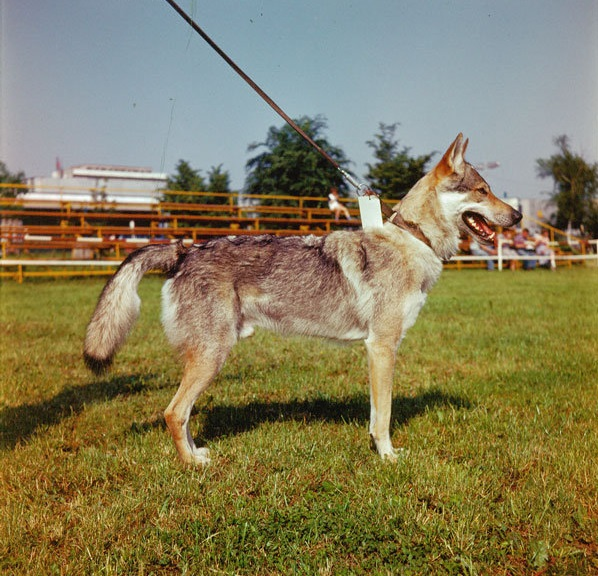
Czechoslovakian Wolfdog

Karel Hartl's lecture, "Results of crossing wolves with dogs", received a lot of attention at the World Dog Show held in June 1965 in Brno and in Prague at the annual meeting of the Fédération Cynologique Internationale (FCI) and the International Cynologic Congress. The following year Hartl compiled a draft standard of a new dog breed. Mating a wolf, Brita, with a German Shepherd, Kurt, then created the basis of a second line. A third line was made by joining the wolf Arga with the female dog Asta from the Sbor národní bezpečnosti (SNB). In 1977, a third-generation hybrid female named Xela of the border guards was covered by the wolf Sarika; he also mated with the female Urta of the border guards. The last addition of wolf blood took place in 1983. The wolf Lejdy of Ohrada Zoo gave birth to last line of the new breed, the father of the puppies being the German Shepherd Bojar von Shottenhof. Since that time, breeding has been carried out only in closed populations and the hybrids are known as Czechoslovakian Wolfdogs.

== Animals at the zoo ==
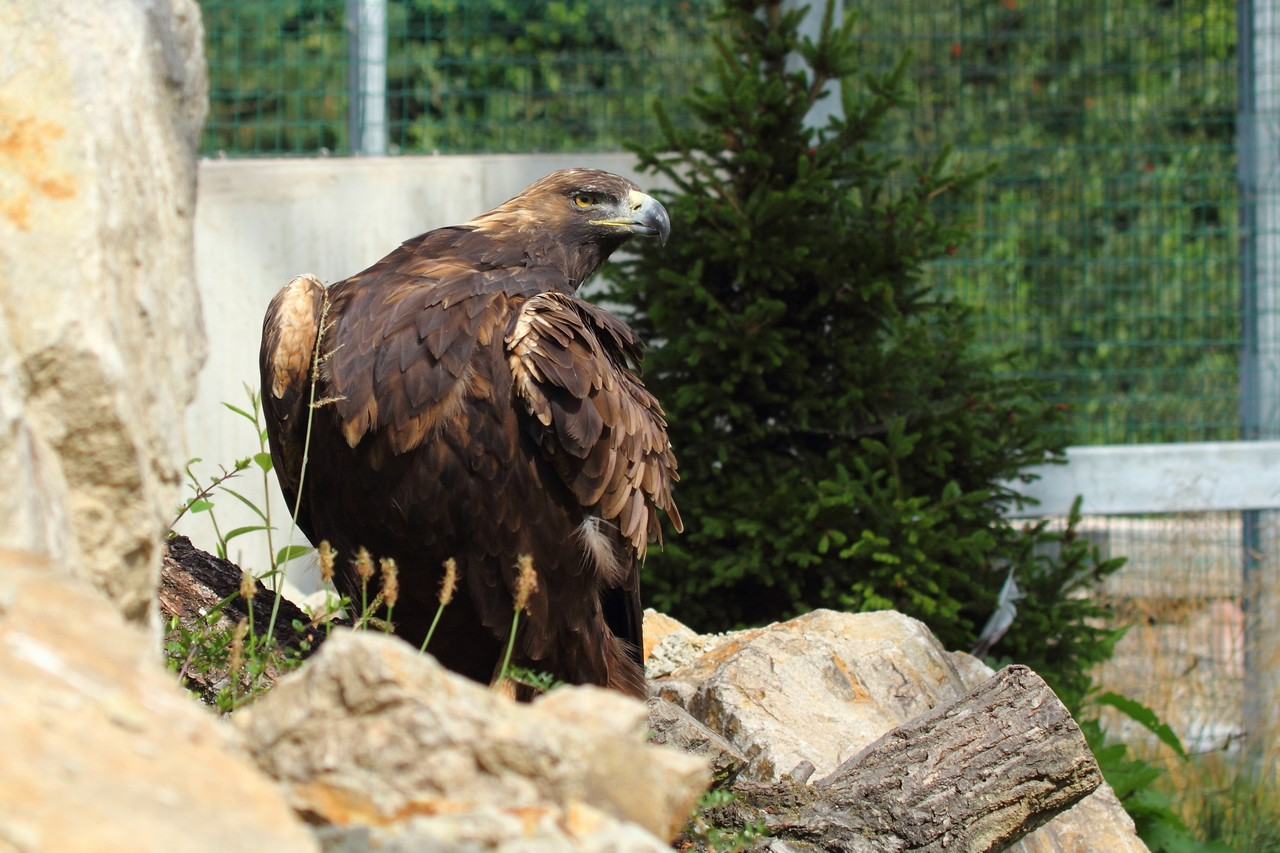

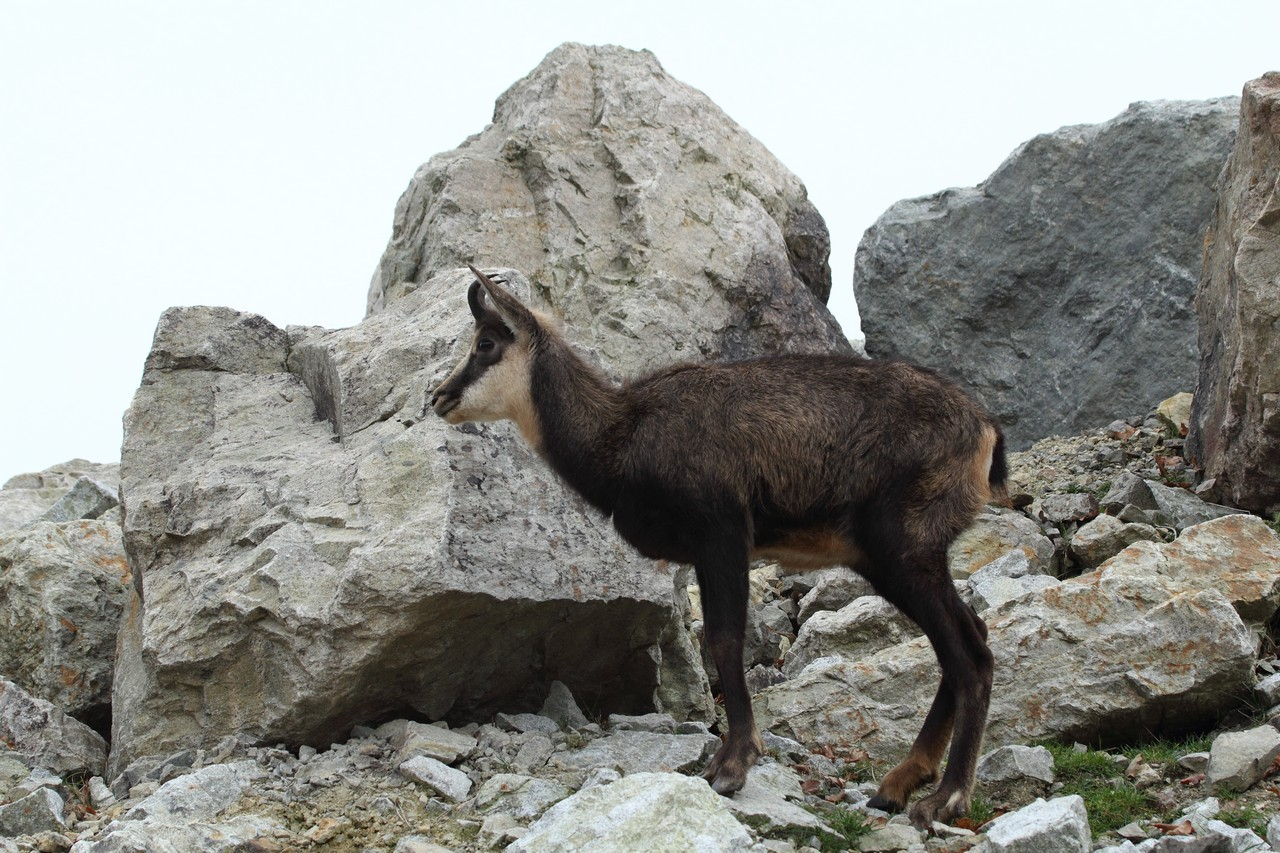

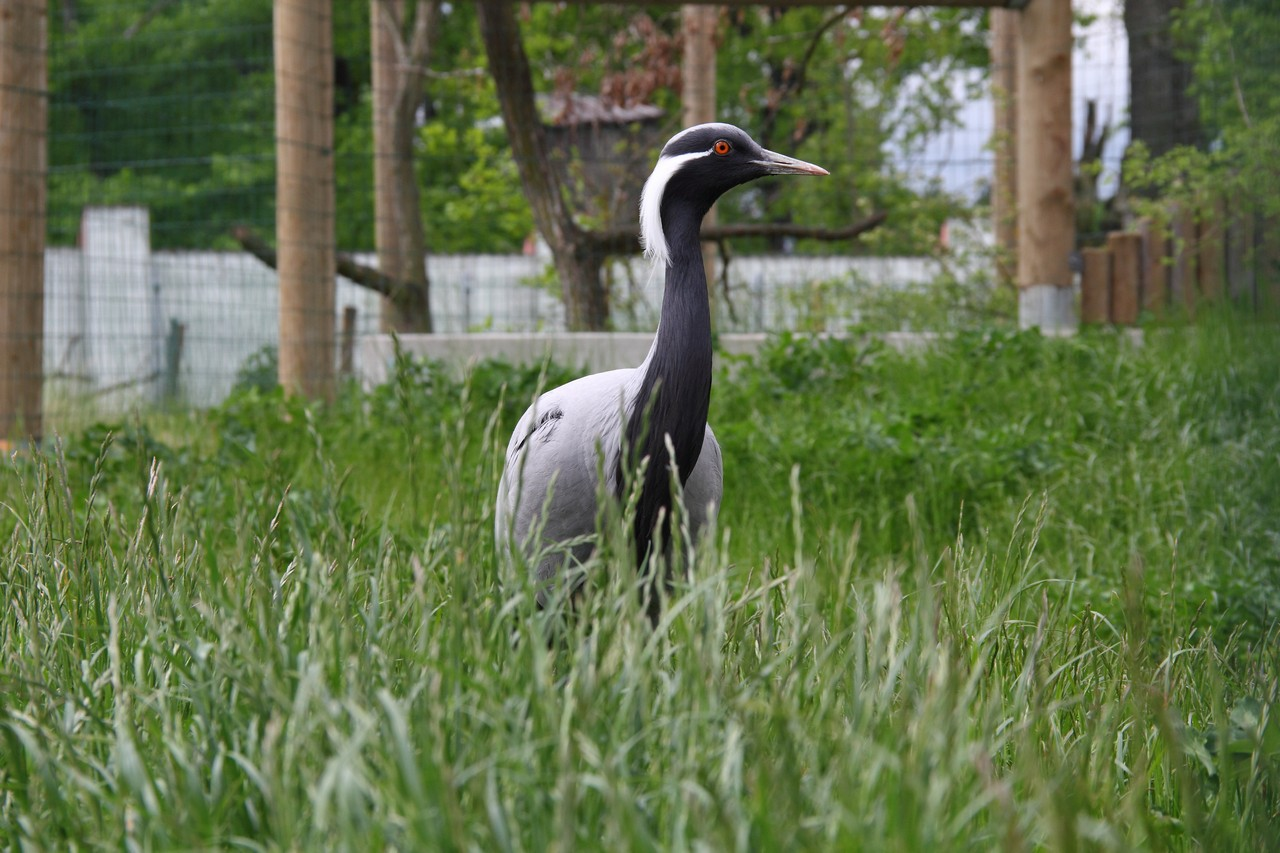

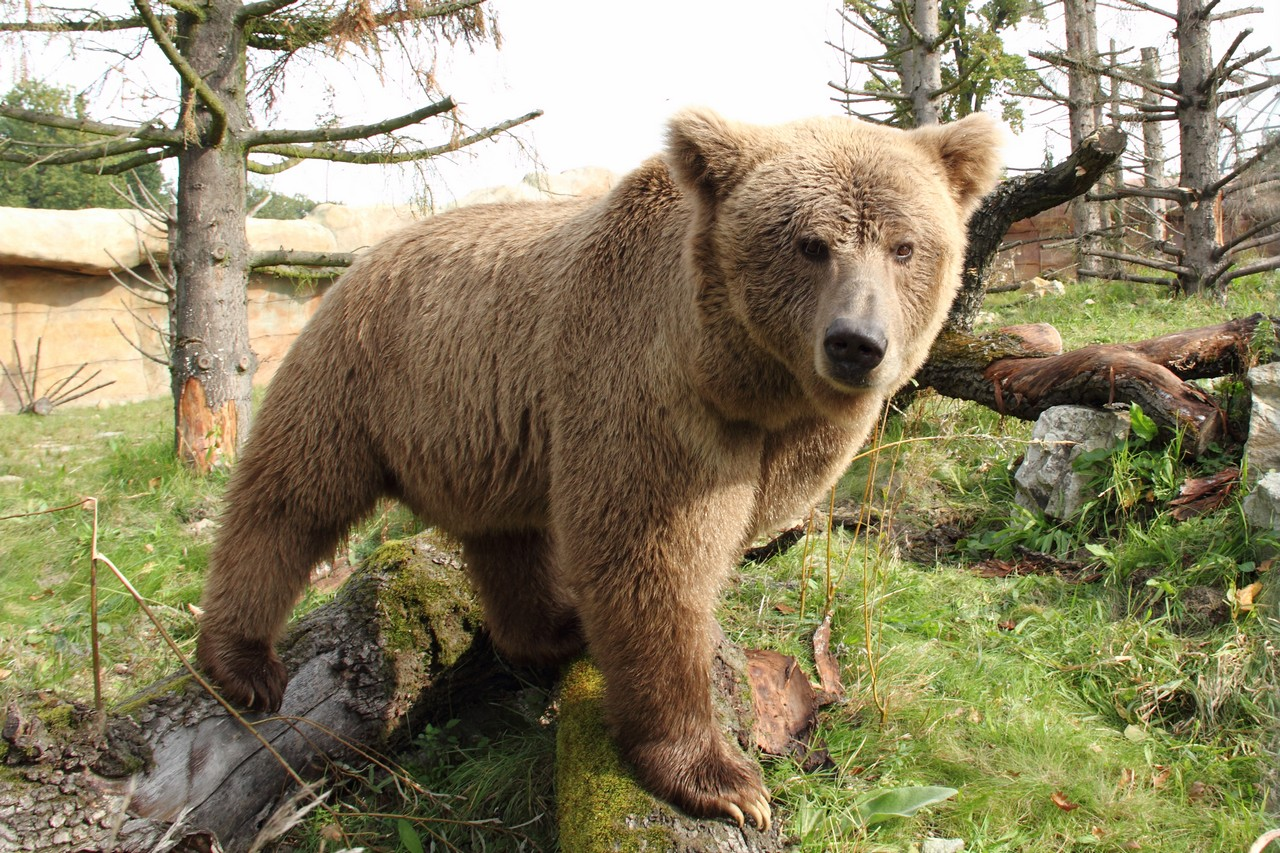

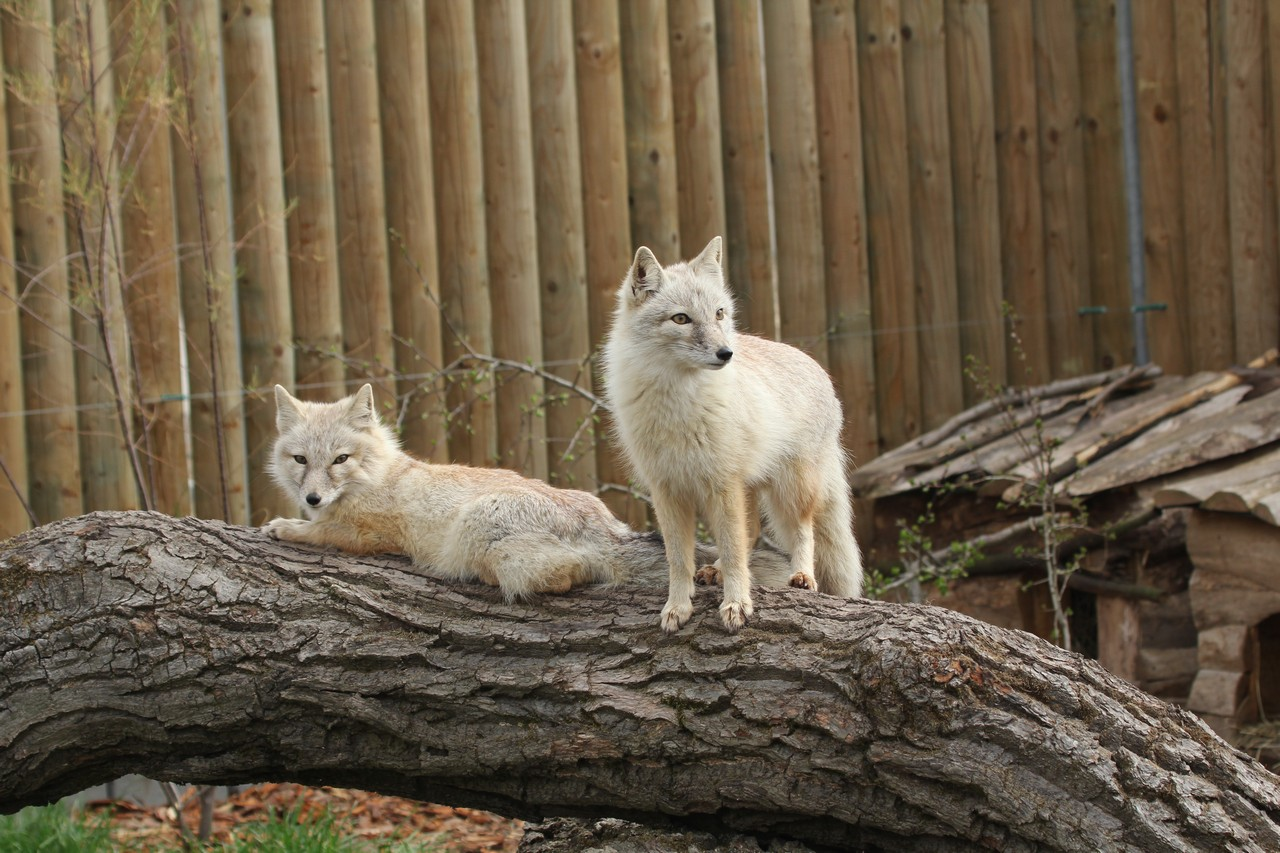

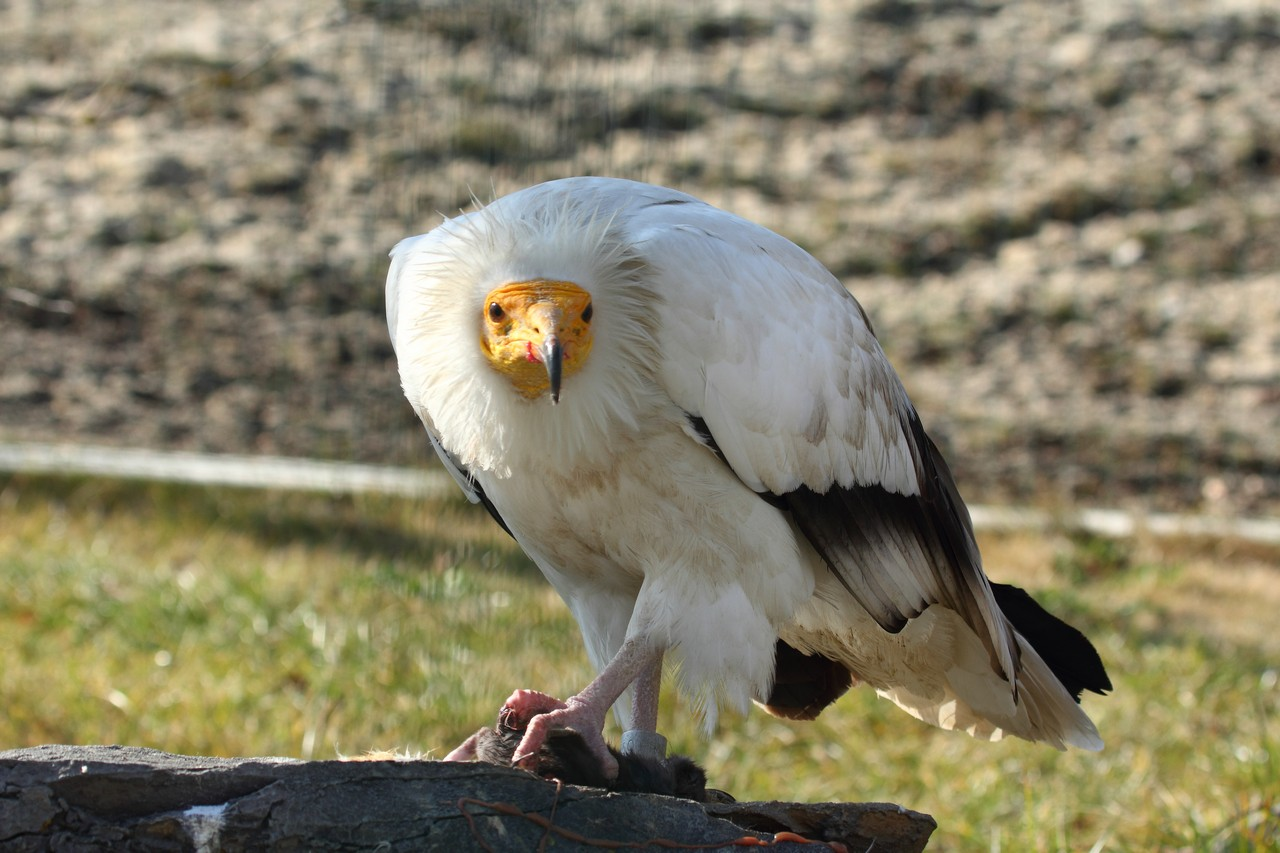

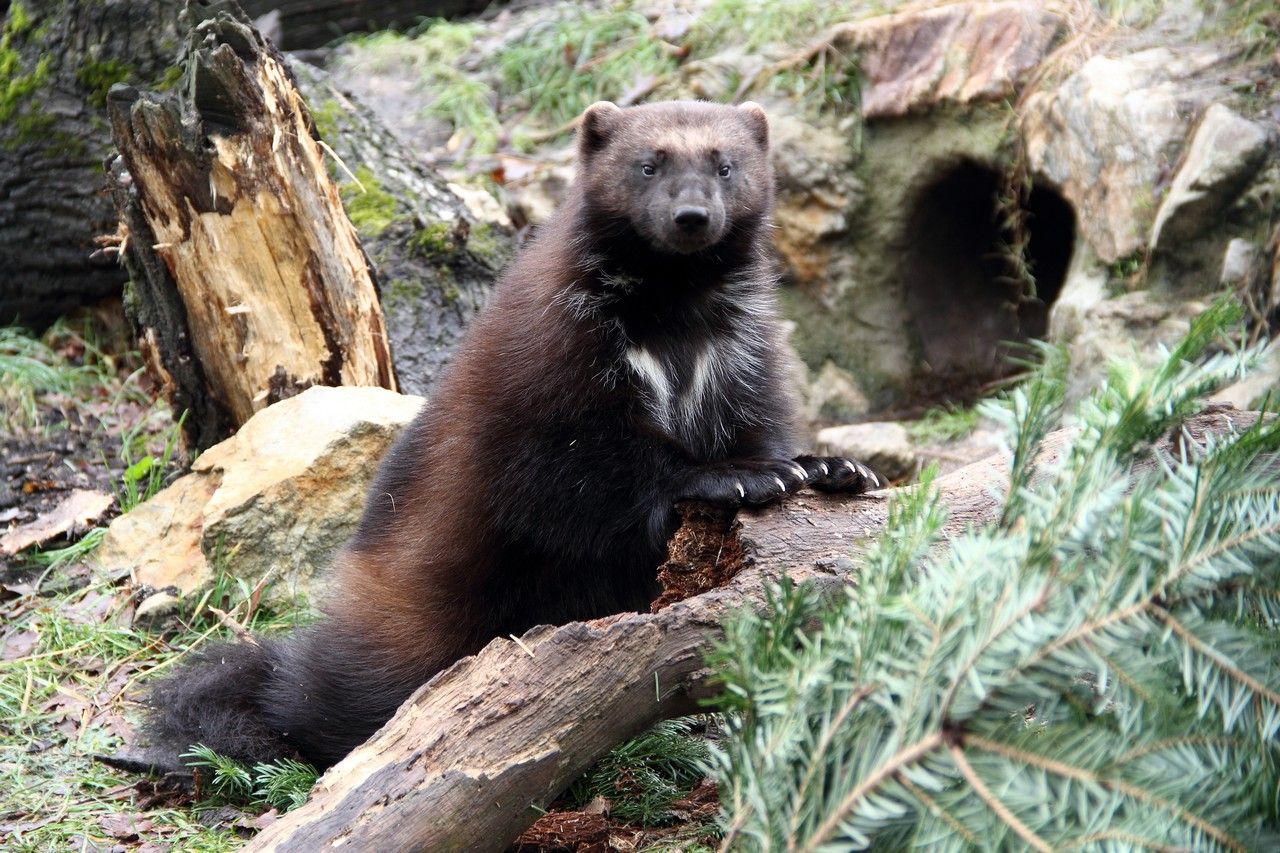

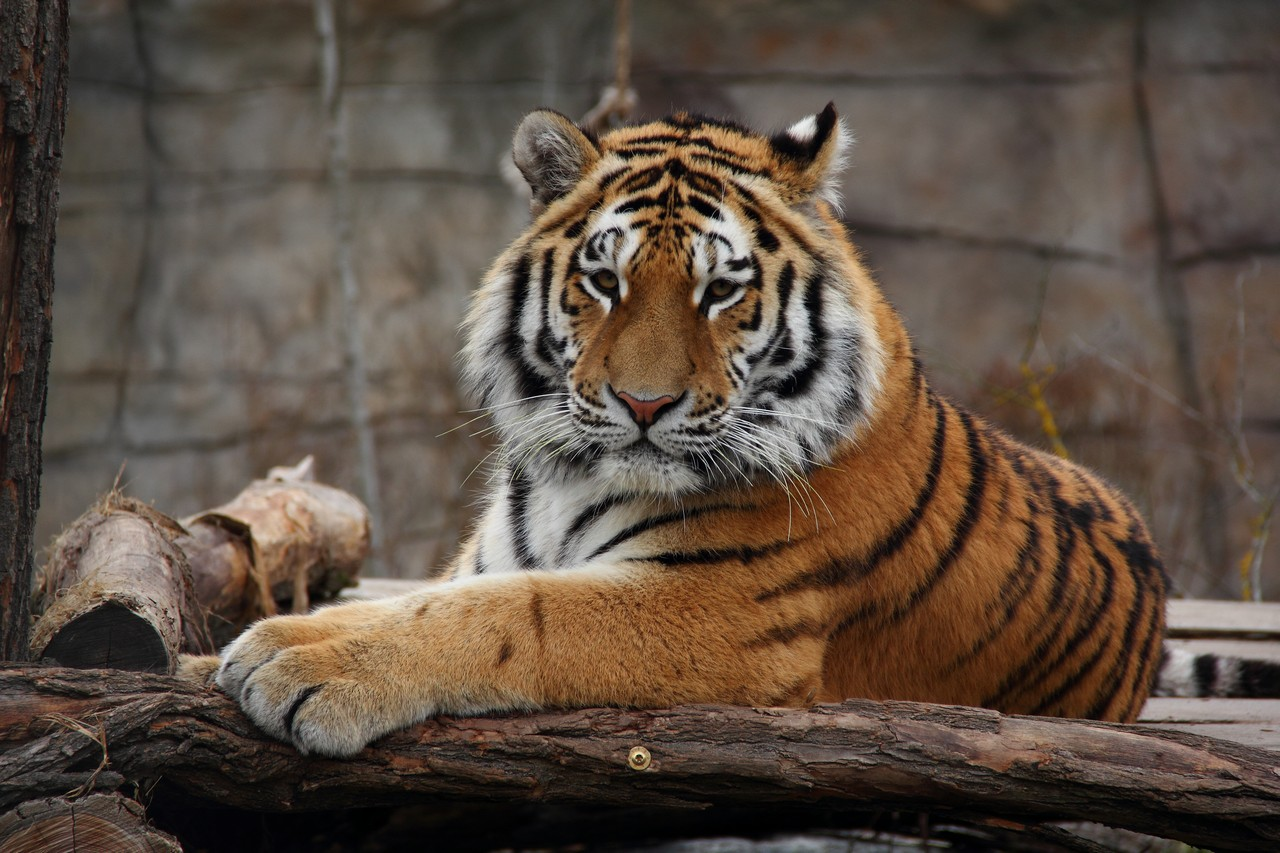

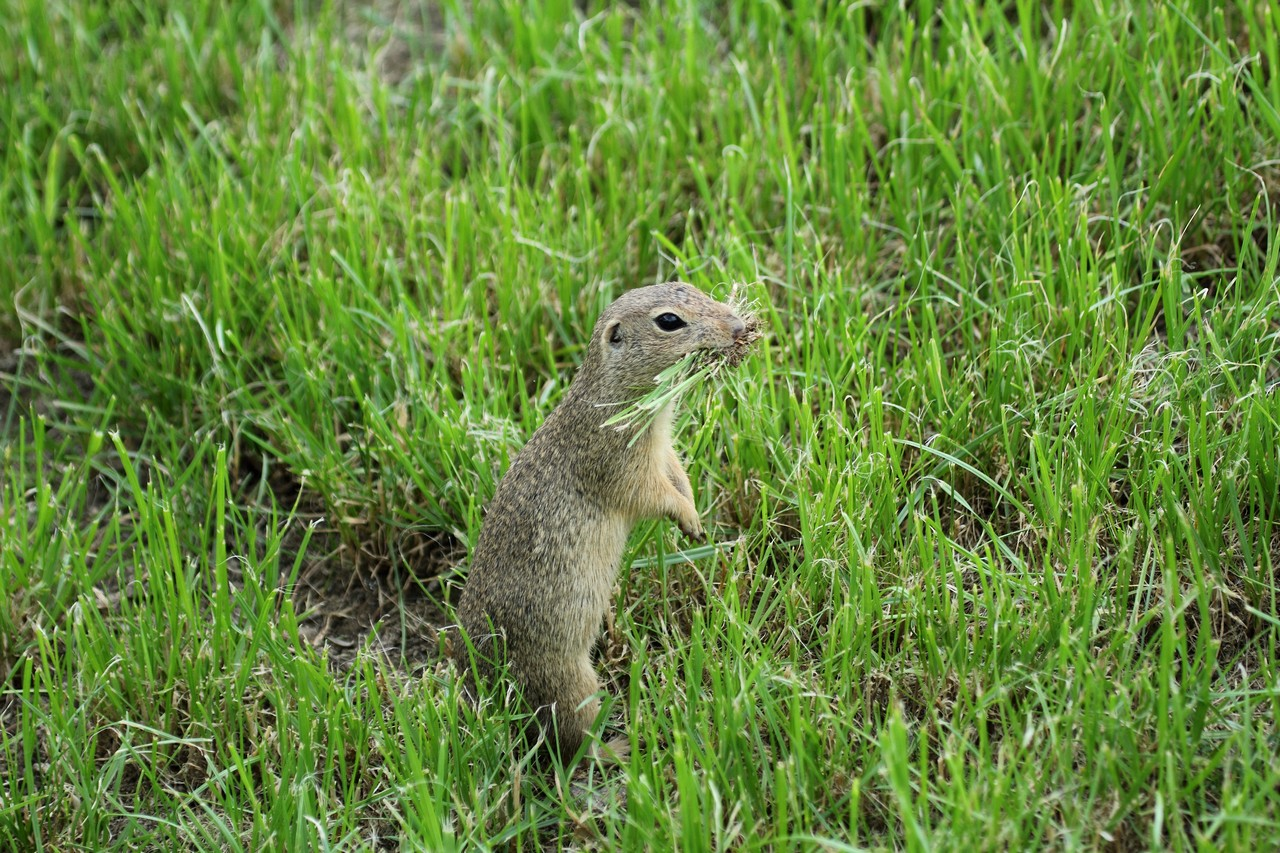

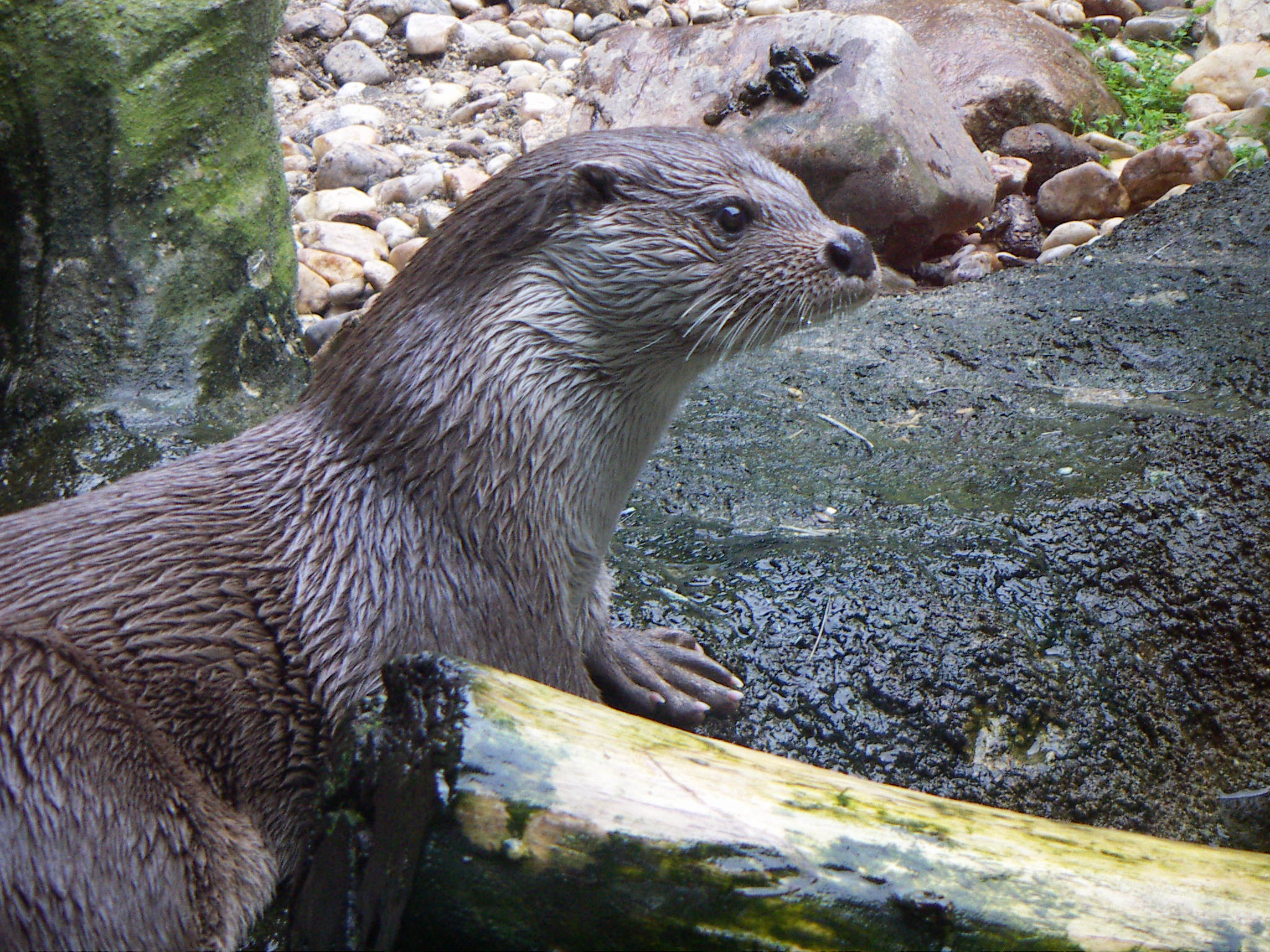

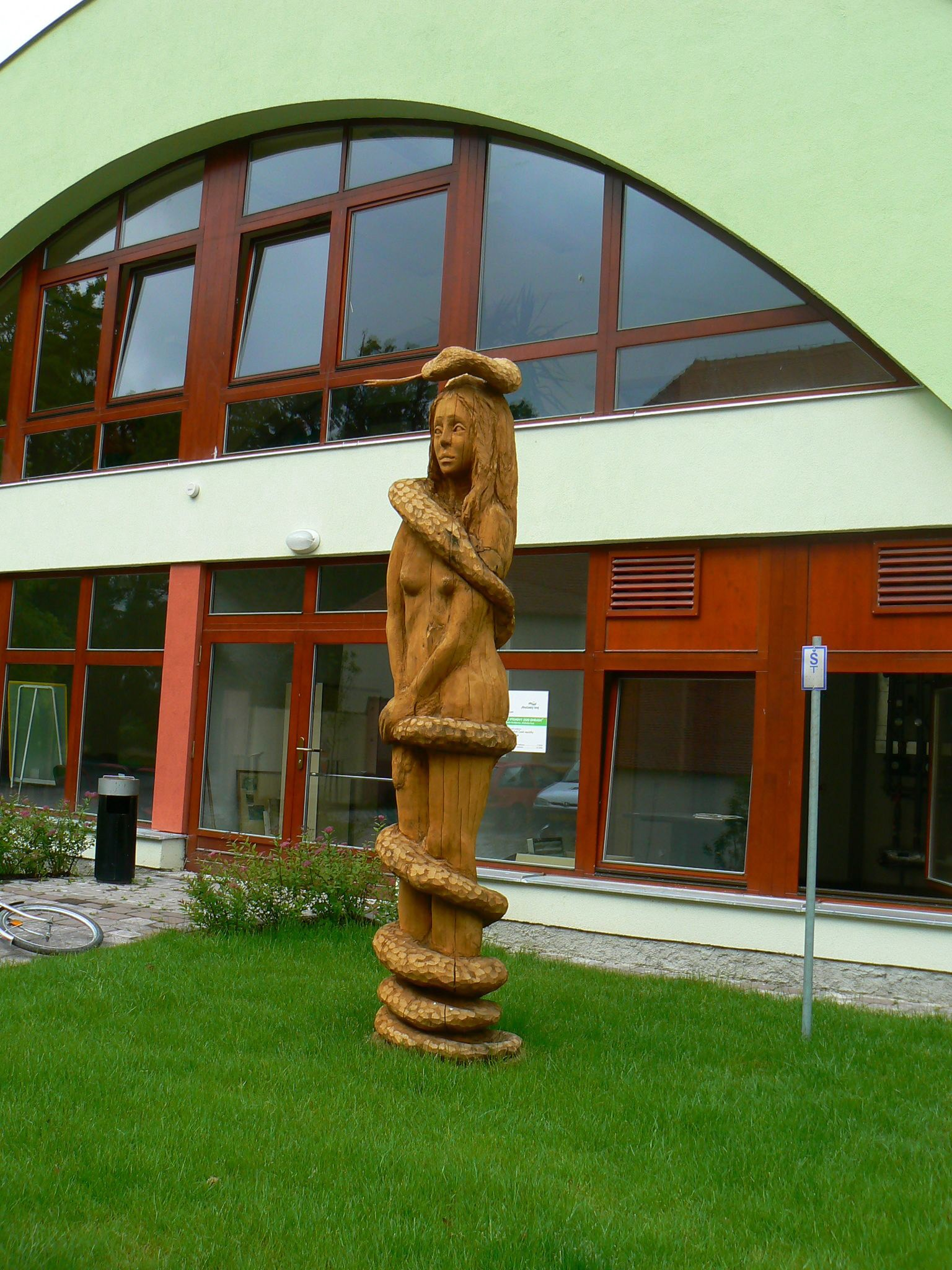

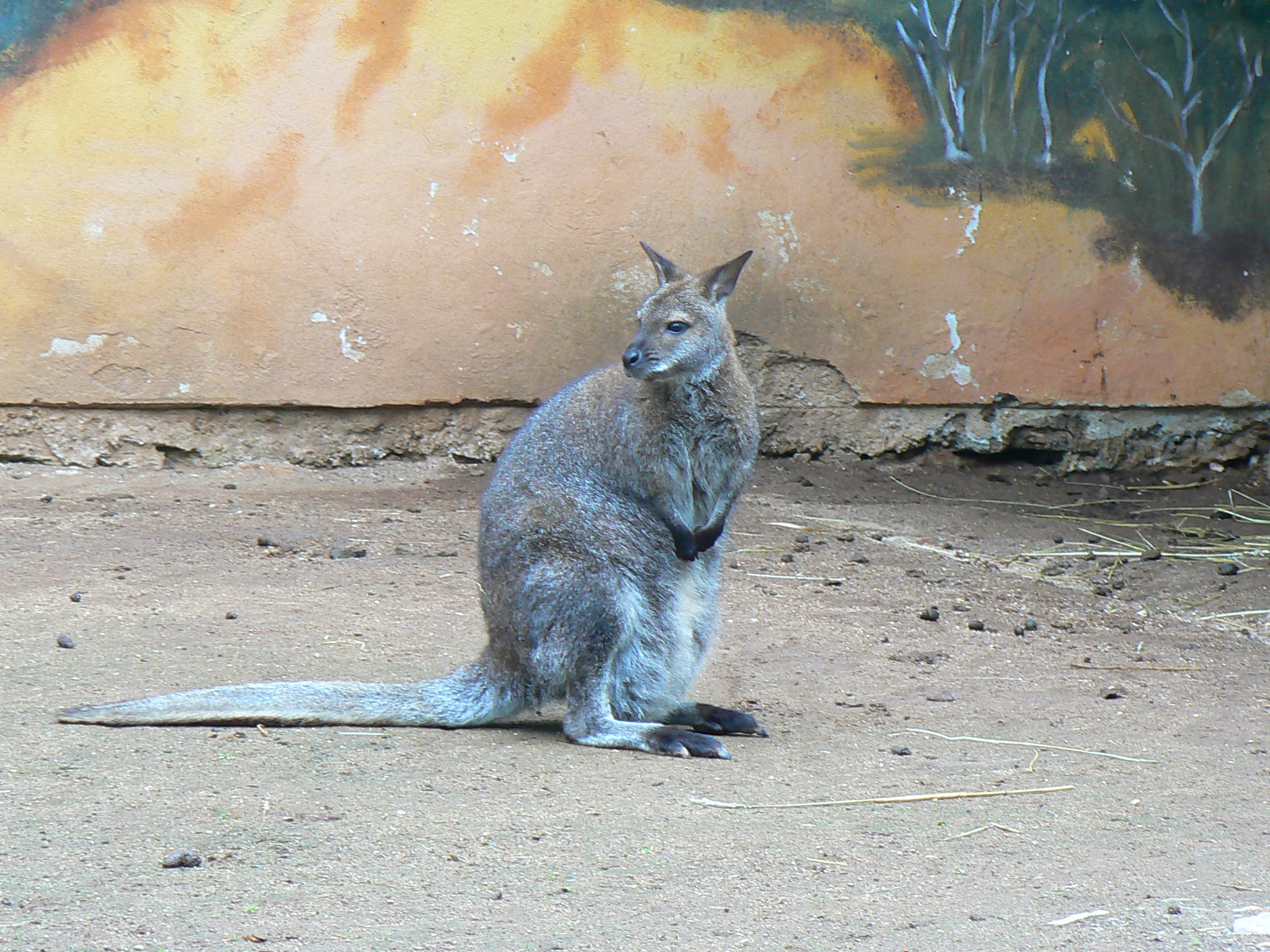

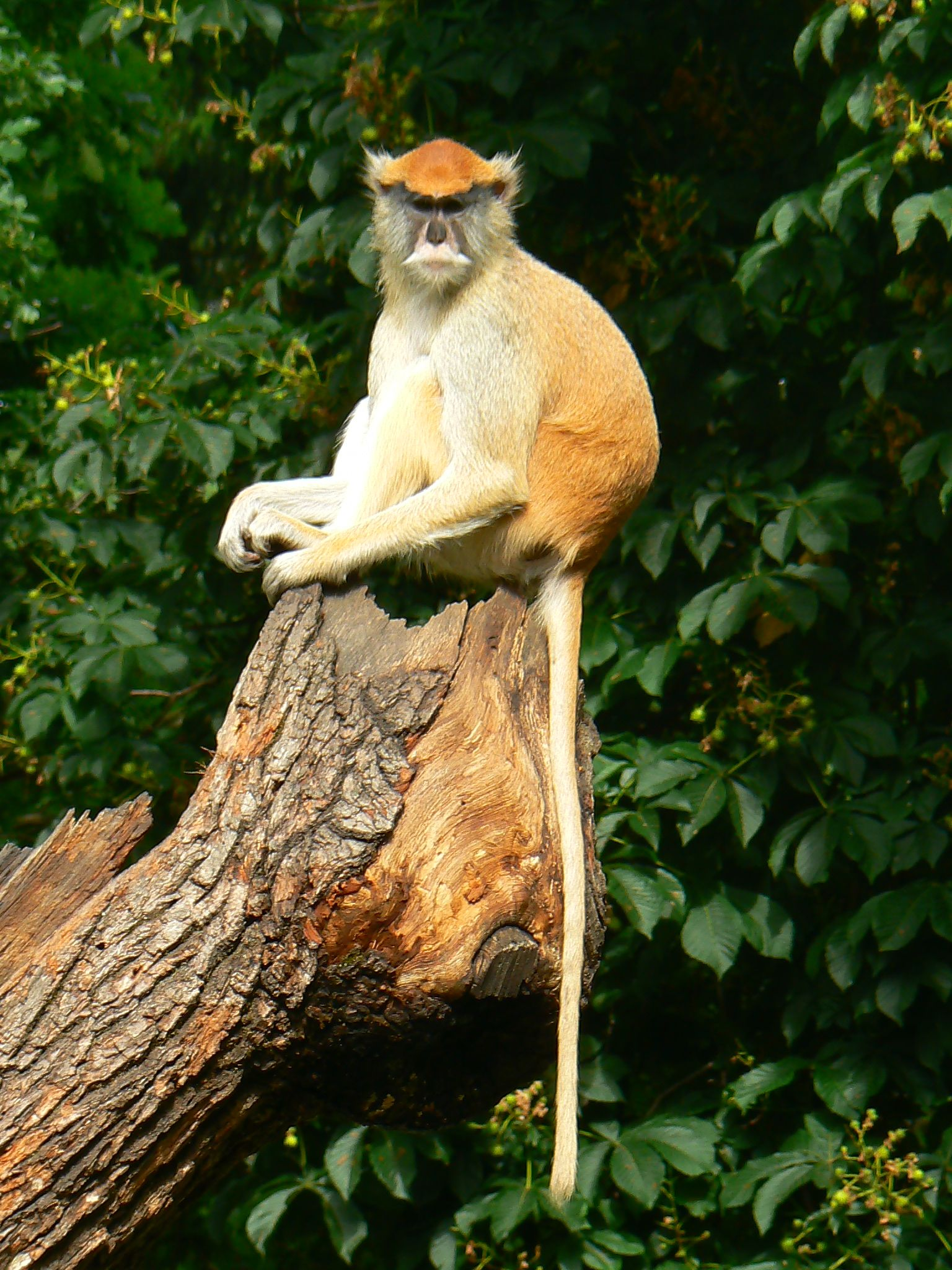

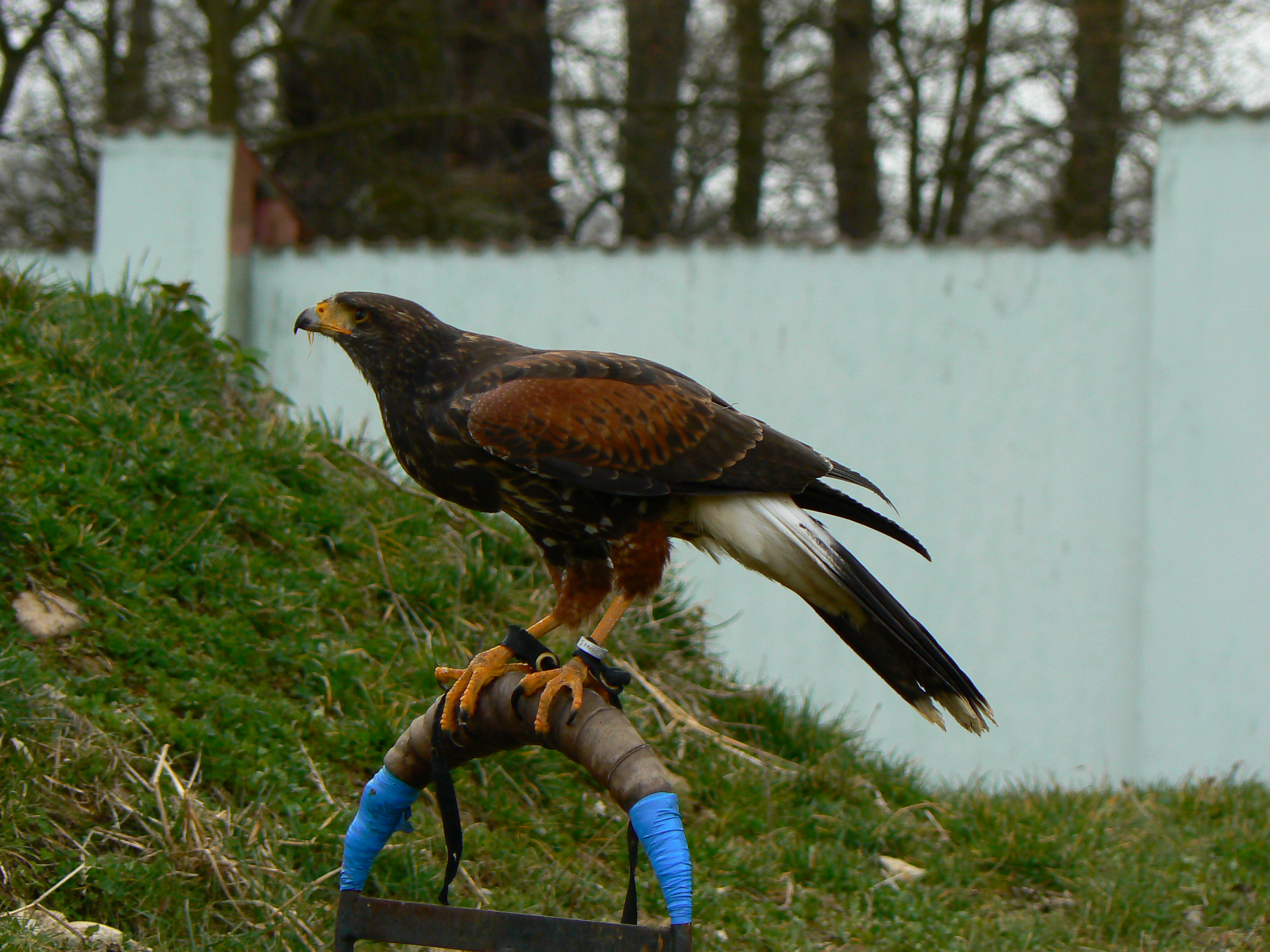

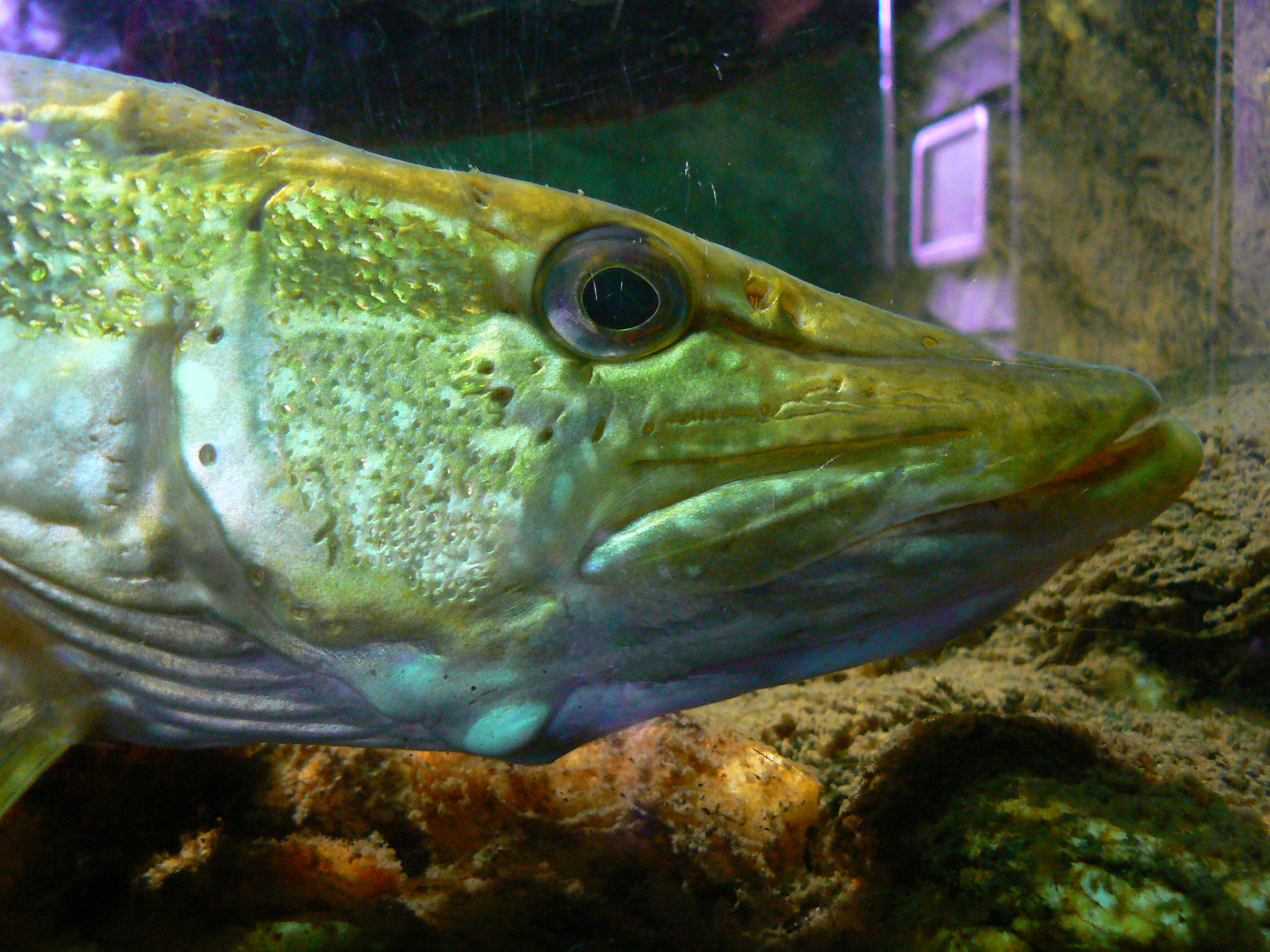

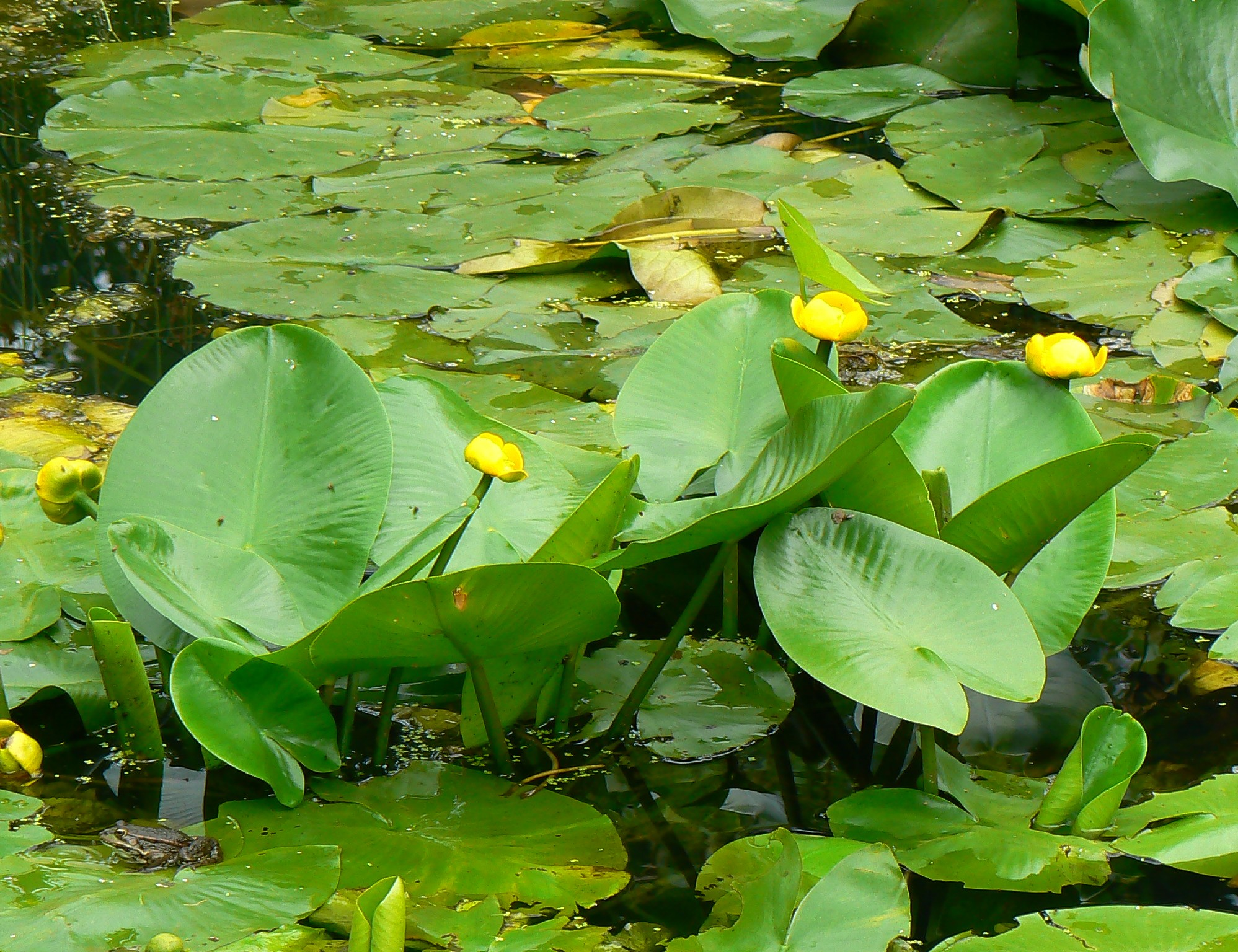

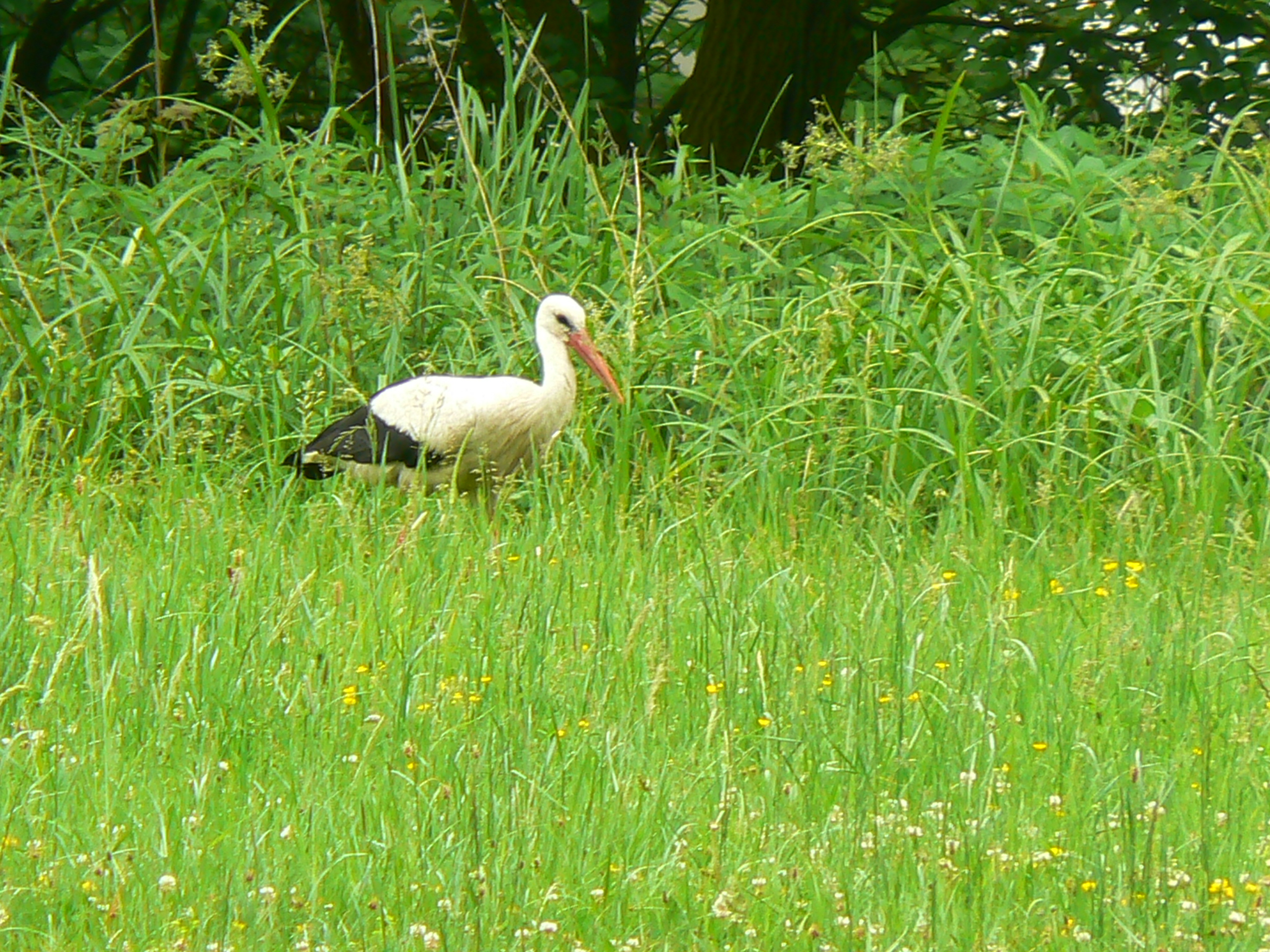

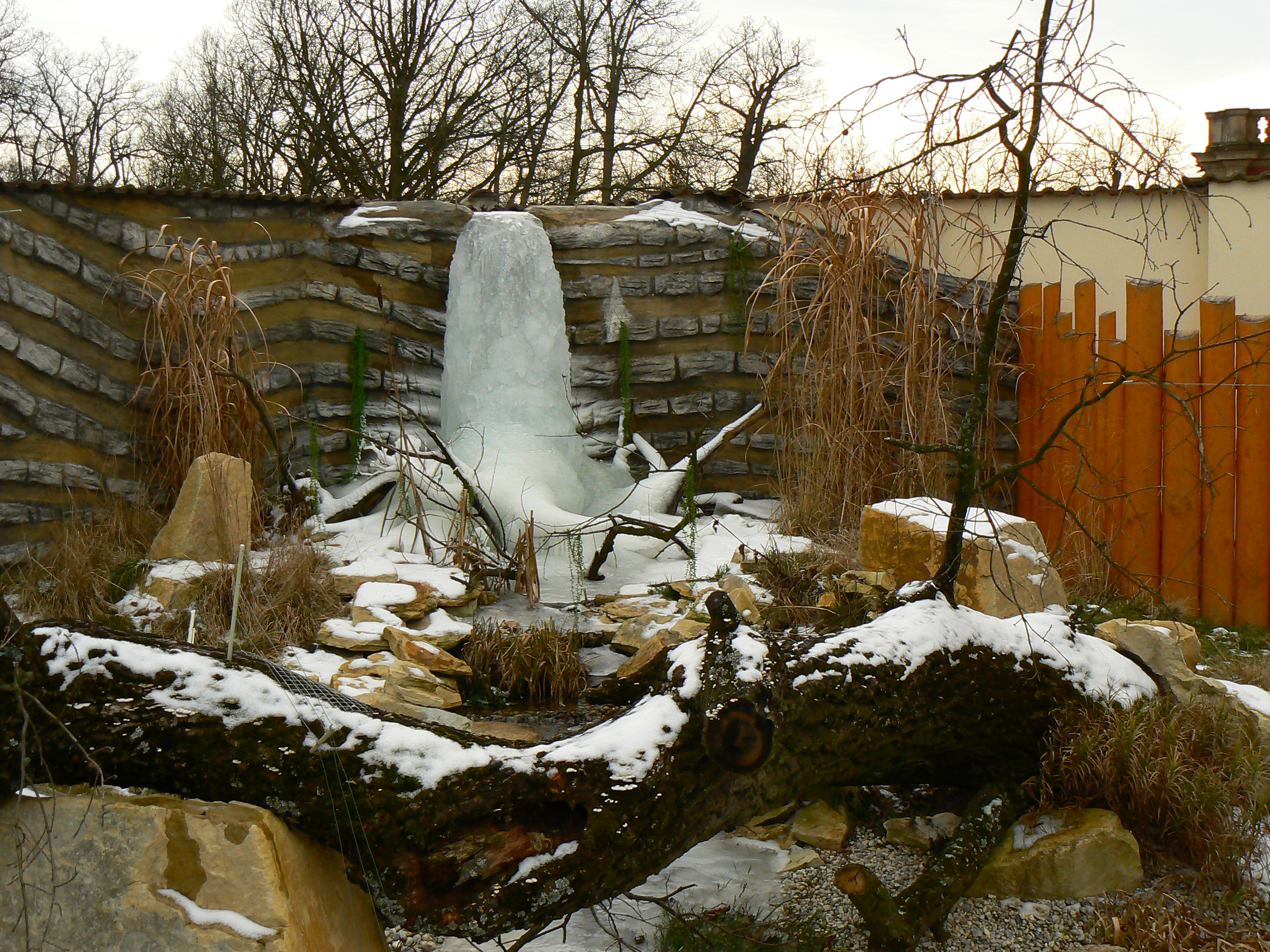

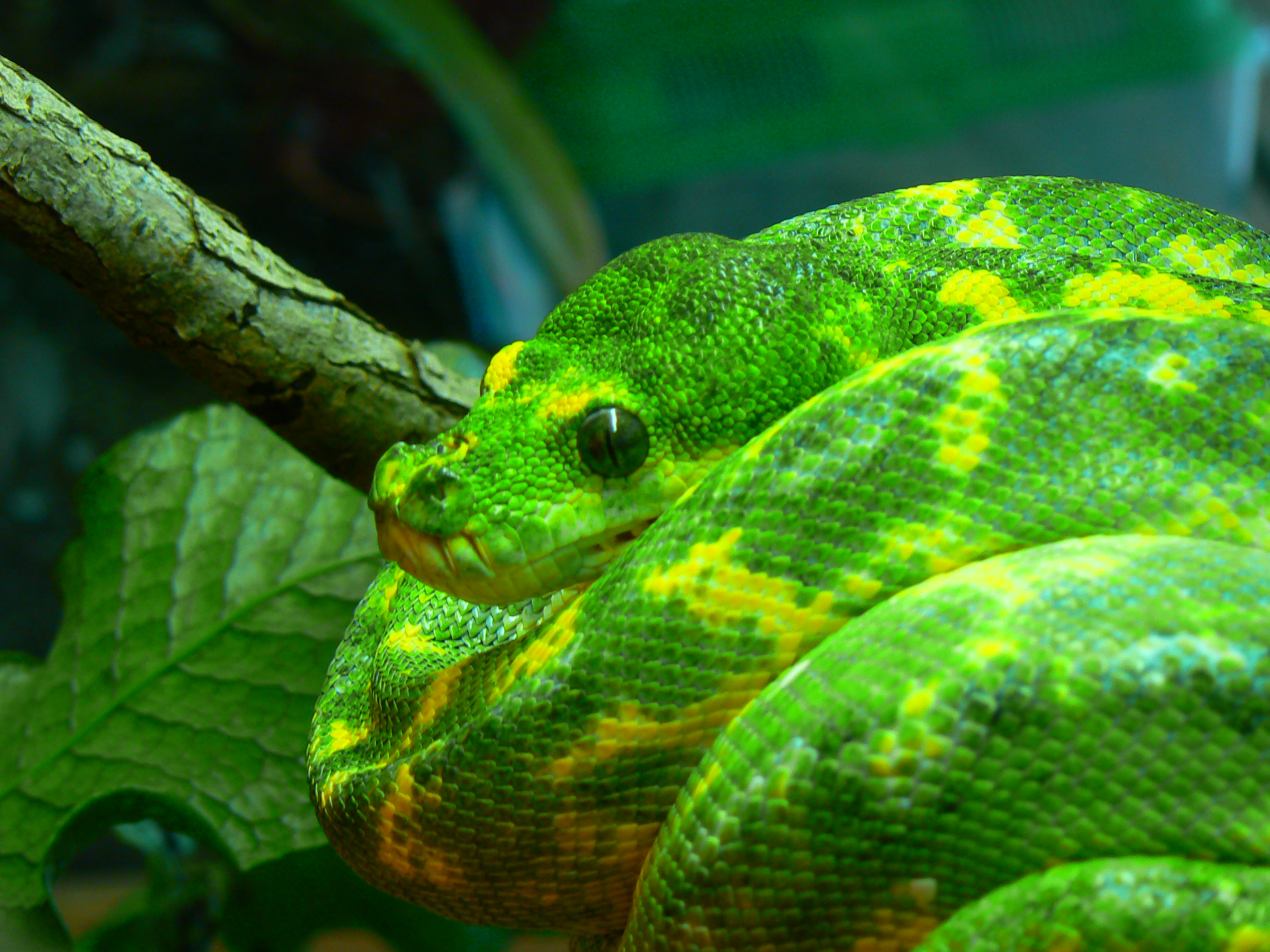

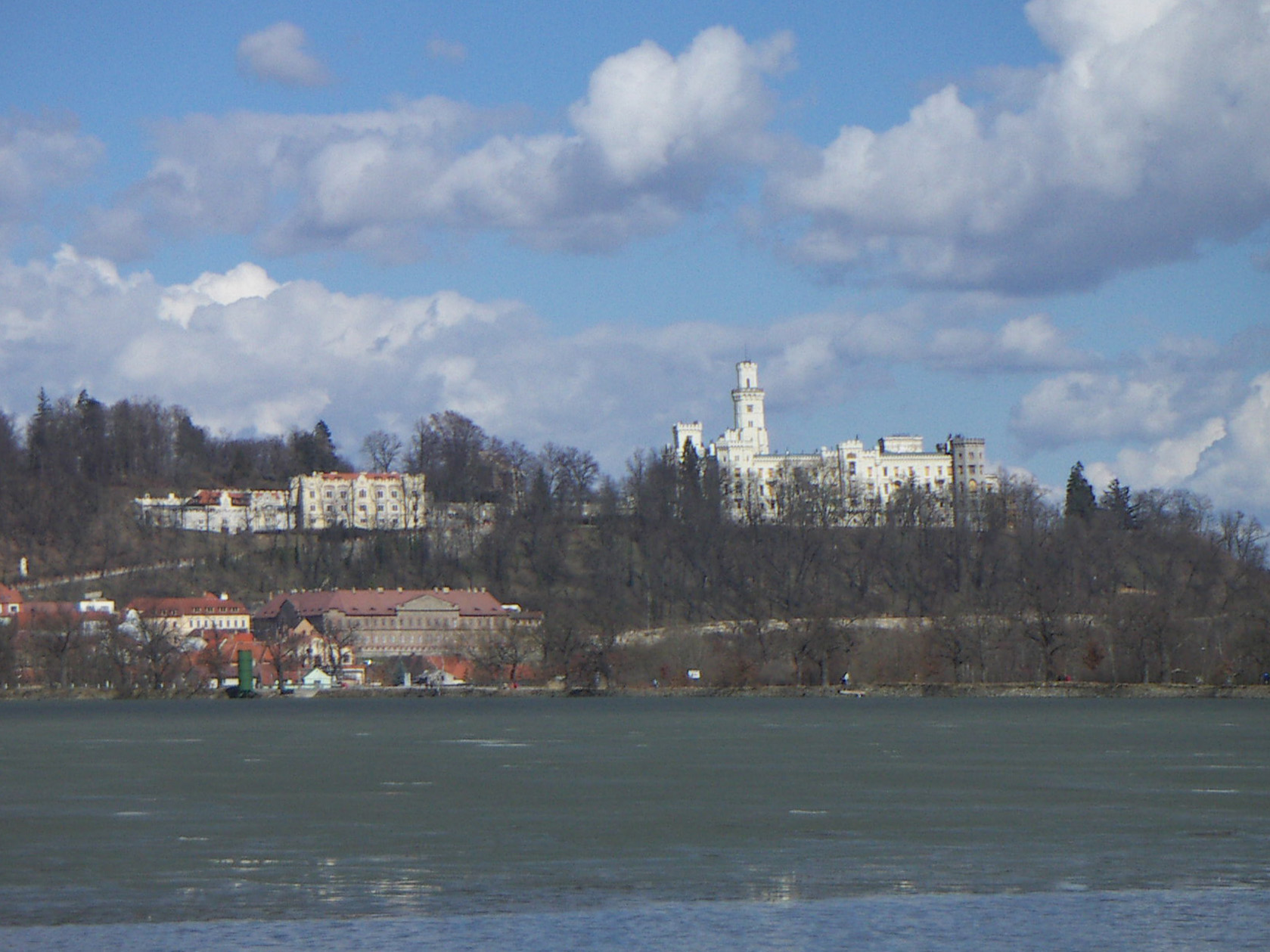
