= Hluboká nad Vltavou =

- Town
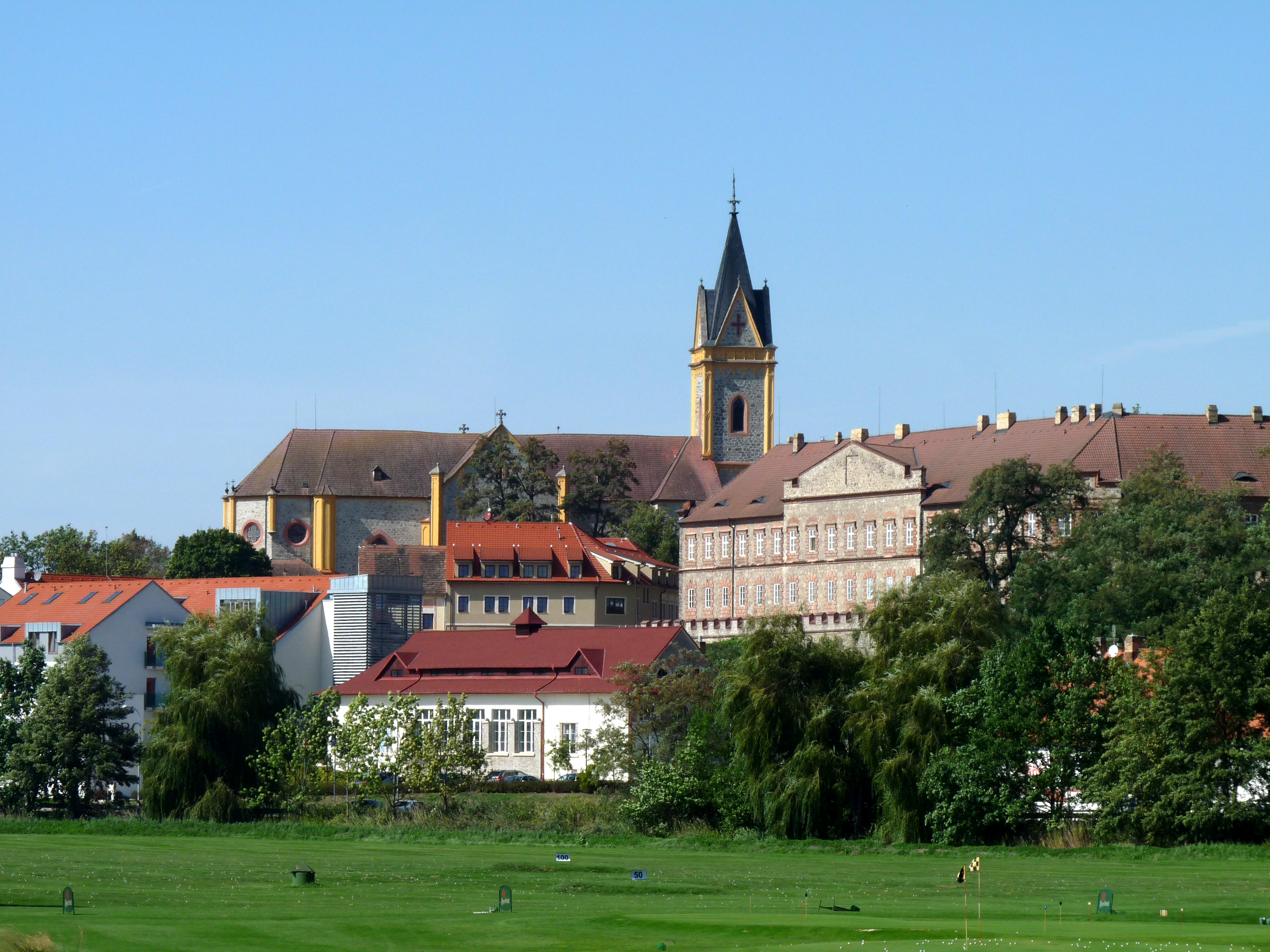
- Centre of the town with Church of Saint John of Nepomuk

- Flag Coat of arms

- Location in the Czech Republic
- Coordinates: 49°3′5″N 14°26′9″E
- Country: Czech Republic
- Region: South Bohemian
- District: České Budějovice
- First mentioned: 1378

Government
  - Mayor: Tomáš Jirsa

Area
  - Total: 91.11 km^{2} (35.18 sq mi)
- Elevation: 394 m (1,293 ft)

Population (2026-01-01)
  - Total: 5,679
  - Density: 62.33/km^{2} (161.4/sq mi)
- Time zone: UTC+1 (CET)
  - Summer (DST): UTC+2 (CEST)
- Postal code: 373 41
- Website: www.hluboka.cz

Hluboká nad Vltavou (Czech pronunciation: [ˈɦlubokaː ˈnad vl̩tavou]; until 1885 Podhrad, German: Frauenberg) is a town in České Budějovice District in the South Bohemian Region of the Czech Republic. It has about 5,700 inhabitants. The town is located on both banks of the Vltava River.

Hluboká nad Vltavou is known for the Hluboká and Ohrada castles, which are together protected as one national cultural monument.

== Administrative division ==
Hluboká nad Vltavou consists of 11 municipal parts (in brackets population according to the 2021 census):

- Hluboká nad Vltavou (4,359)
- Bavorovice (281)
- Buzkov (2)
- Hroznějovice (54)
- Jaroslavice (1)
- Jeznice (35)
- Kostelec (147)
- Líšnice (30)
- Munice (196)
- Poněšice (36)
- Purkarec (169)

== Etymology ==
The name of the town was taken from the name of the local castle. The castle was named Frauenberg in German, which was derived from Old German vrôburg (i.e. "Lord's castle"). The Czech name Hluboká literally means 'deep' and originated from the location of the castle above a deep valley.

== Geography ==
Hluboká nad Vltavou is located about 7 kilometres (4 mi) north of České Budějovice. It is situated on both banks of the Vltava River. The stream Bezdrevský potok flows into the Vltava south of the town proper. There are many fishponds in the municipal territory. The town proper lies on the shore of the largest of them, which is Munický rybník with an area of 108 ha (270 acres).

Hluboká nad Vltavou lies mostly in the Tábor Uplands, but the southern part with the ponds lies in the České Budějovice Basin, and the eastern part extends into the Třeboň Basin. The northern part of the large municipal territory is covered by forests. The highest point is the hill Velký Kameník at 575 m (1,886 ft) above sea level.

== History ==
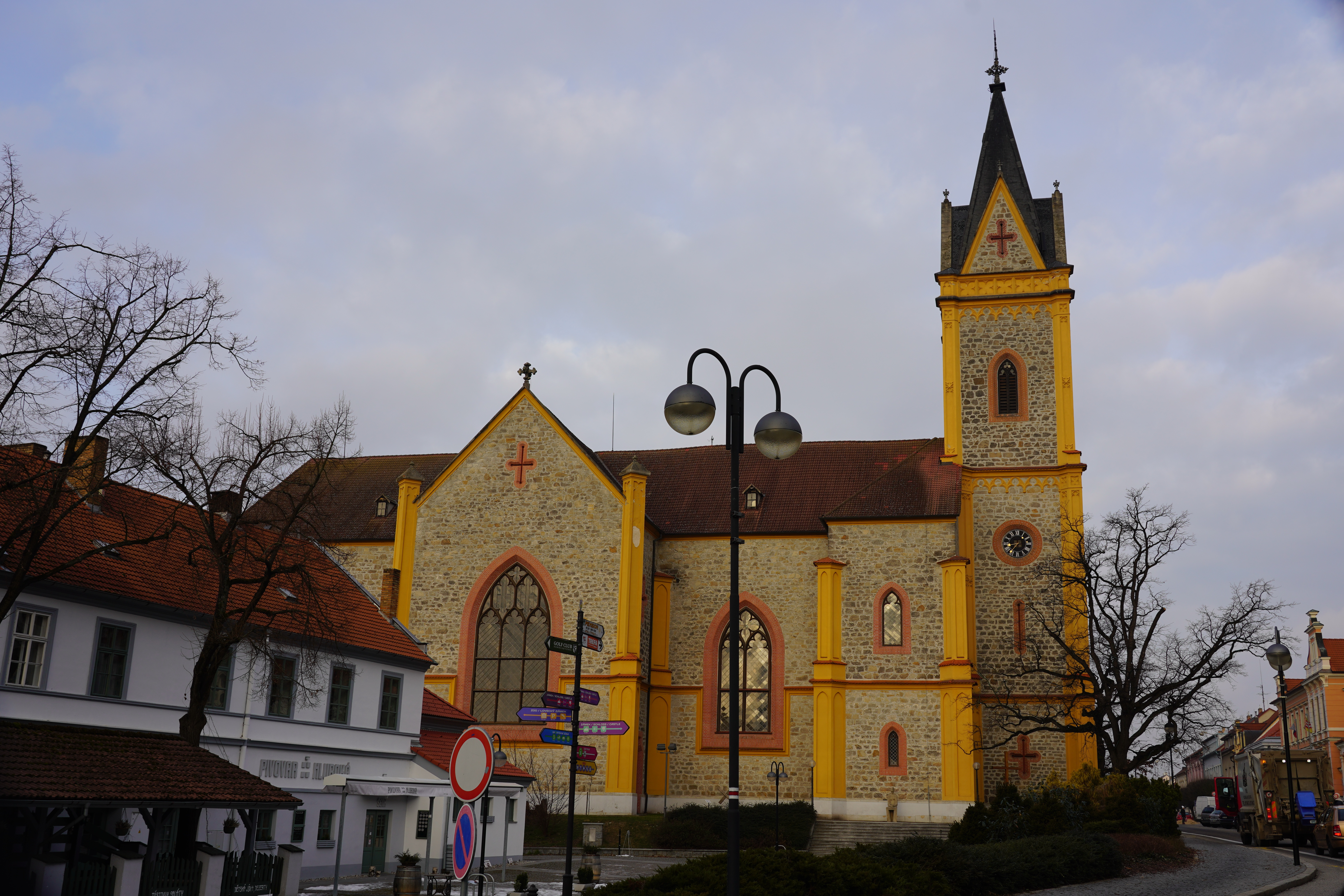
Church of Saint John of Nepomuk

History of the town is connected with a castle, which was founded together with the city of České Budějovice by King Ottokar II on a rocky promontory above the Vltava river. A settlement was founded below the castle and named Podhrad (literally 'below-castle').

The castle later passed to the Vítkovci dynasty. Held by the local noble Vilém II of Pernštejn from 1490 onwards, the castle and the town prospered. In 1496, Podhrad was promoted to a market town.

The acquisition by the Schwarzenberg family in 1661 brought even greater wealth to the area. After a brief capture by French forces and a blaze in 1742, during the War of the Austrian Succession, the medieval fortress was slighted and rebuilt into a Renaissance castle, then between 1839 and 1871 into the current Neo-Gothic castle.

The first Jews came into the market town around 1724. The old synagogue was replaced by a new one in 1907, but it ceased to serve its purpose after its interior was destroyed by the Nazis during World War II.

The present-day municipality arose in 1850. The majority of the population was Czech-speaking. The market town was renamed after the Hluboká Castle in 1885. In 1907, Hluboká became a town by decision of Franz Joseph I.

== Demographics ==
Historical population

Year	Pop.	±%
1869	4,845	—
1880	5,628	+16.2%
1890	5,442	−3.3%
1900	5,353	−1.6%
1910	5,578	+4.2%

Year	Pop.	±%
1921	5,391	−3.4%
1930	5,151	−4.5%
1950	4,263	−17.2%
1961	4,485	+5.2%
1970	4,236	−5.6%

Year	Pop.	±%
1980	4,373	+3.2%
1991	4,277	−2.2%
2001	4,538	+6.1%
2011	4,982	+9.8%
2021	5,310	+6.6%

Source: Censuses

== Transport ==
The I/20 road (part of the European route E49) from České Budějovice to Plzeň and Karlovy Vary runs through the southern part of the municipal territory.

Hluboká nad Vltavou is located on the railway lines České Budějovice–Písek and České Budějovice–Strakonice.

== Education ==
The Townshend International School has been based in the town since 1992.

== Culture ==
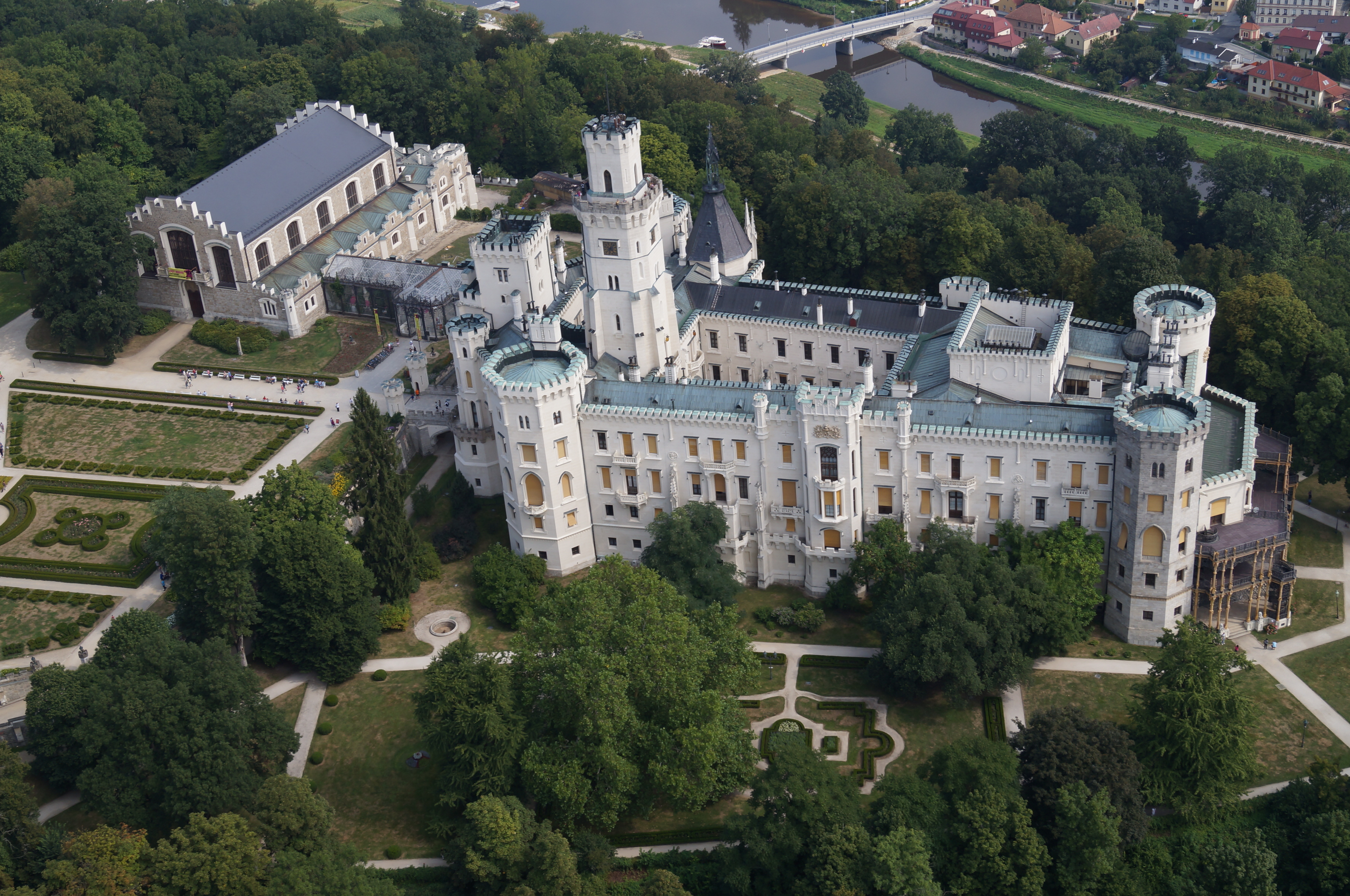
Hluboká Castle

The Aleš South Bohemian Gallery is located on the Hluboká Castle. It was founded in 1953 and named after Czech painter Mikoláš Aleš. It is one of the five largest art museums in the country. The art gallery manages about 20,000 art objects. The Adoration of the Three Kings from České Budějovice, an early 16th-century wooden relief, is on exhibit in the gallery's permanent collection.

== Sights ==
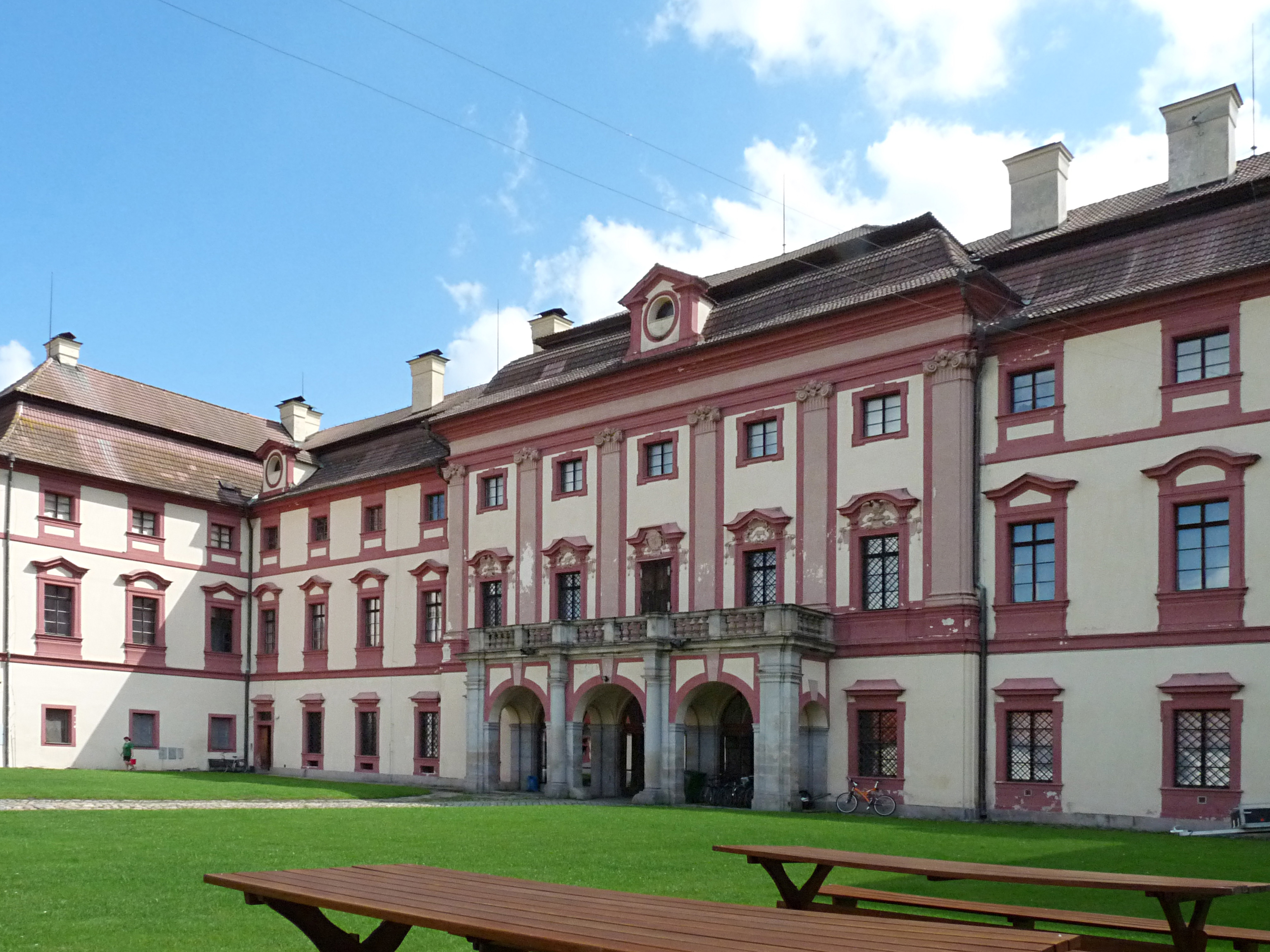
Ohrada Castle

The main landmarks of Hluboká nad Vltavou are Hluboká and Ohrada castles. Together they area protected as one national cultural monument. Hluboká Castle was originally a medieval castle from the 13th century, rebuilt in the Tudor Revival style in 1839–1871. Today it is owned by the state and offers guided tours. Every year it is one of the ten most visited castles in the country.

The Ohrada Castle is a hunting castle, built in the Baroque style in 1708–1713. In 1842, the Hunting Museum, one of the oldest museums in the country, was established here. It still exist under the name Museum of Forestry, Hunting and Fishing, and is managed by National Museum of Agriculture in Prague.

Next to the castle is the zoological garden Zoo Hluboká, colloquially known as Ohrada Zoo. It has an area of almost 5 hectares (12 acres) and breeds about 300 species of animals.

== Notable people ==
- František Mareš (1857–1942), professor and politician; died here
- Eduard Bloch (1872–1945), Austrian medical doctor
- Miroslav Dvořák (1951–2008), ice hockey player
- Martin Latka (born 1984), footballer

== Twin towns – sister cities ==
Hluboká nad Vltavou is twinned with:

- Bolligen, Switzerland
- Grein, Austria
- Neustadt an der Aisch, Germany
