= Grafenau, Bavaria =

Grafenau
- Town
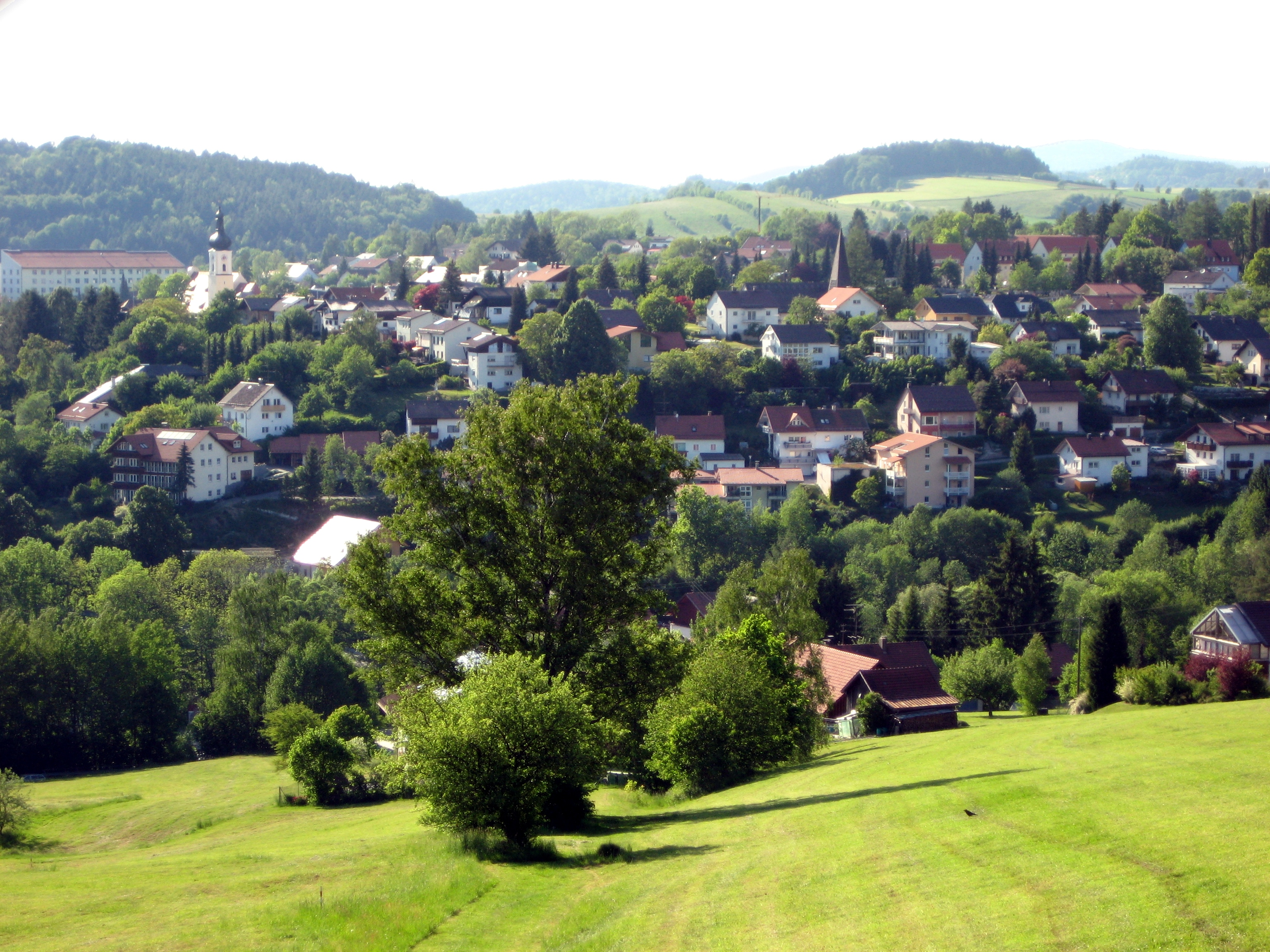
- Grafenau

- Coat of arms

- Location of Grafenau within Freyung-Grafenau district
- Interactive map of Grafenau
- Location within Germany Location within Bavaria
- Coordinates: 48°51′N 13°23′E
- Country: Germany
- State: Bavaria
- Admin. region: Niederbayern
- District: Freyung-Grafenau

Government
  - Mayor (2020–26): Alexander Mayer

Area
  - Total: 63.73 km^{2} (24.61 sq mi)
- Elevation: 609 m (1,998 ft)

Population (2025-12-31)
  - Total: 8,171
  - Density: 128.2/km^{2} (332.1/sq mi)
- Time zone: UTC+01:00 (CET)
  - Summer (DST): UTC+02:00 (CEST)
- Postal codes: 94475–94481
- Dialling codes: 08552
- Vehicle registration: FRG, GRA, WOS
- Website: www.grafenau.de

Grafenau (German pronunciation: [ɡʁaːfəˈnaʊ]) is a town in the Freyung-Grafenau district, in Bavaria, Germany. 32 km north of Passau, the town is situated in the Bavarian Forest and is the base of the Bavarian Forest National Park Authority. Grafenau is a holiday destination with a variety of kinds of accommodation from self-catering apartments to a "holiday village".

== Location and facilities ==
The town lies in the Bavarian Forest at a height between 600 and 700 meters over sea level, right beside the Bavarian Forest National Park. The Kleine Ohe river flows along the east and south of the town. It is close to the Frauenberg.

In April 1945, Major General Stafford LeRoy Irwin opened his XII Corps Headquarters there.

Since 1976 there has been an artificial lake (surrounded by a park) which is used for sport and recreation.

There are museums about the town and surrounding area, including a museum with a collection of traditional furniture, and also a museum about snuff.

The town has curling and ice skating rinks (which are seasonal), and ski drag lifts in an area which in summer months is used for bobsleds. There is also a golf course.

There is a Catholic church, a railway terminus, and a bus station, in addition to a range of hotels, shops, and garage facilities for motorists.

== Gallery ==
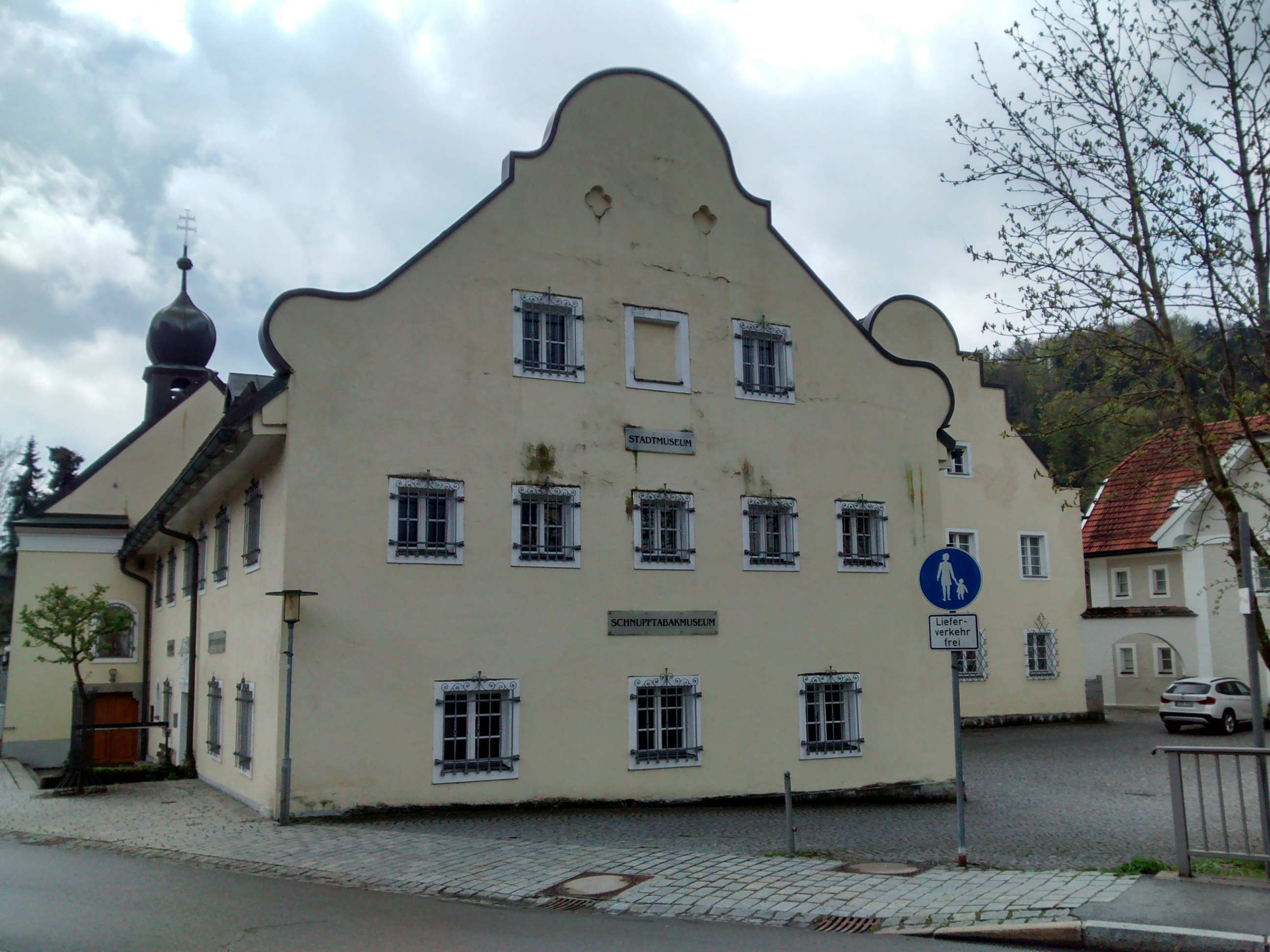
Local museum in Grafenau

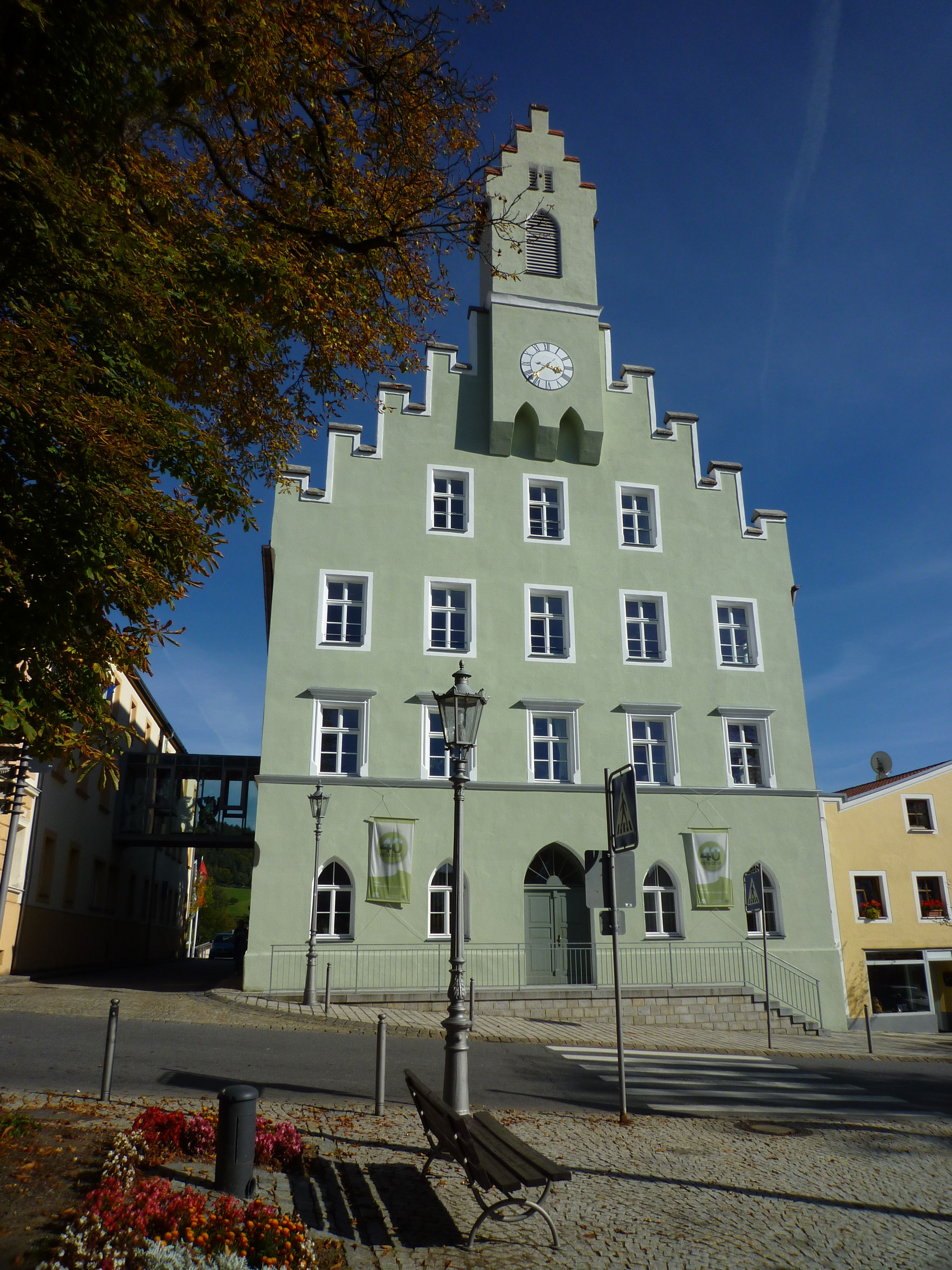
Grafenau - former town hall

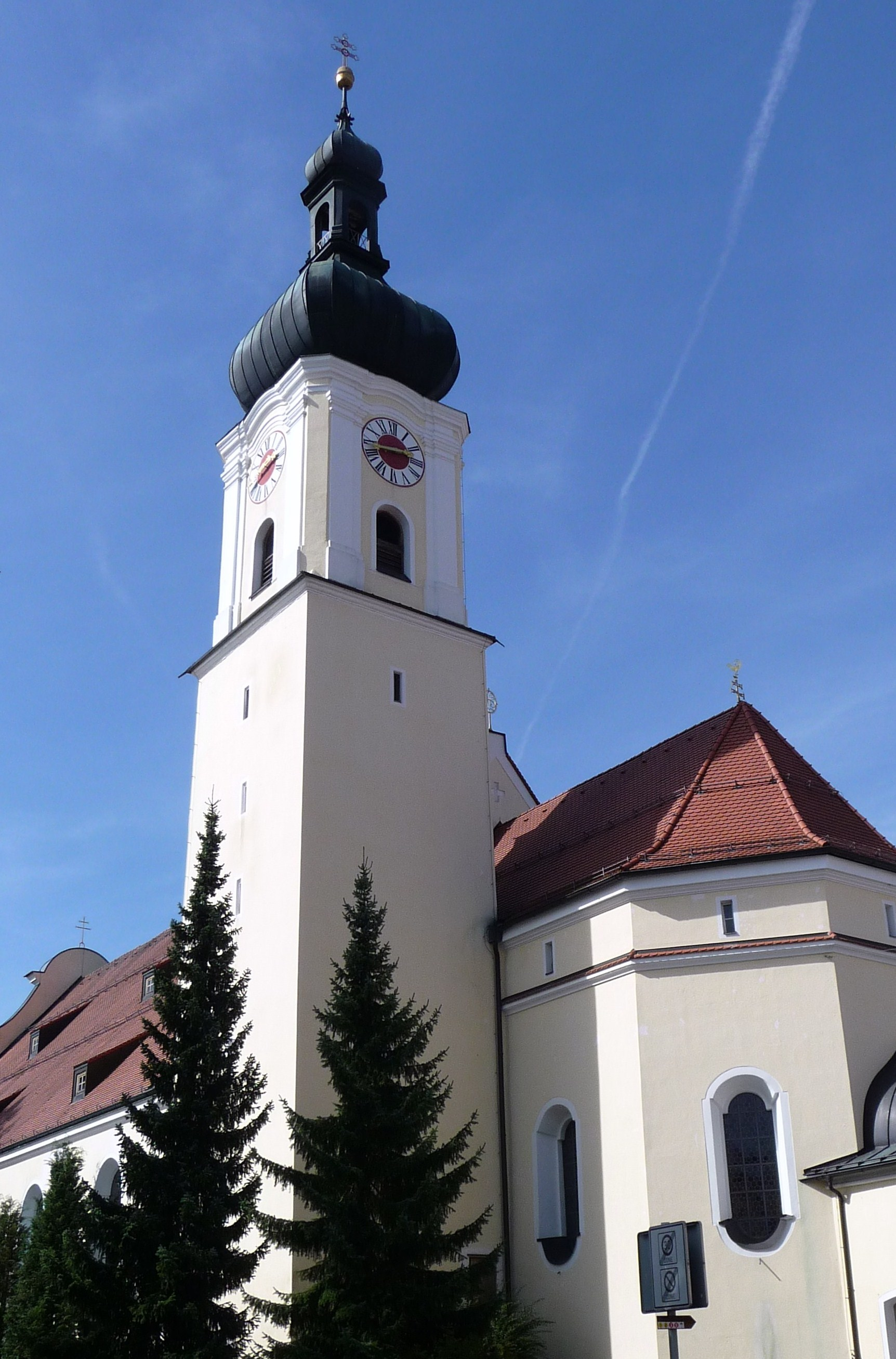
Church of the Assumption of the Virgin Mary in Grafenau

== Personalities ==
- Alfred Edel (1932–1993), actor, was buried in Grafenau.
- Fredl Fesl (1947–2024), singer-songwriter-musician, was born in Grafenau.

== Twin towns ==
Grafenau is twinned with:

- Kašperské Hory (Bergreichenstein), Czech Republic
- Schärding, Austria
