= Adoration of the Three Kings from České Budějovice =

Religious Gothic relief

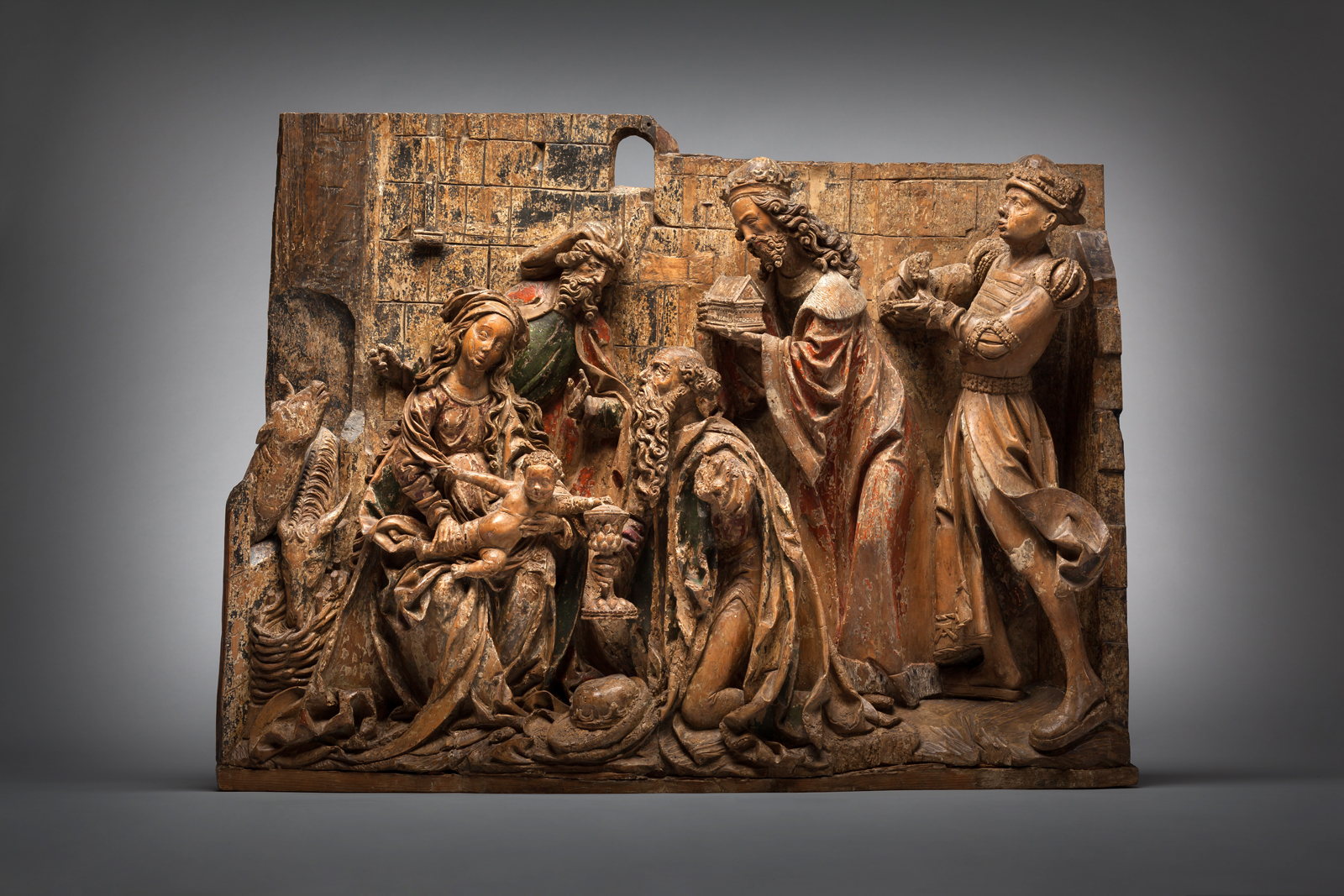
Adoration of the Three Kings from České Budějovice, Aleš South Bohemian Gallery in Hluboká nad Vltavou

This late Gothic relief with a scene showing the Adoration of the Three Kings came from the defunct hospital Church of St Wenceslaus in České Budějovice. It was carved between 1500 and 1510, most likely in the workshop of the Monogrammist AI who is often identified with Master Alexander (Alexandr Schniczer). The relief is on show at the permanent collection of the Aleš South Bohemian Gallery in Hluboká nad Vltavou.

== History ==
The Hospital and Church of St Wenceslaus in České Budějovice was founded in 1327 and ceased to exist in 1840. The relief of the Adoration of the Three Kings was put on show every Christmas at the Church of St Nicholas. It was later the property of the family of municipal scribe Illing, passing on to his daughter and then to his granddaughter. It was from his granddaughter that the relief was purchased in 1910 by the Town Museum, from where it was transferred to the collection of the Aleš South Bohemian Gallery in Hluboká nad Vltavou.

== Description and classification ==
It is a high relief in lime wood with partly preserved original polychromy. It measures 73 x 98 x 22 cm. It was restored by Jiří Blažej (1953–1954) and Ludmila Slánská (Prague, 1965).

Against the relief's background, comprising an indicated wall made up of cube-shaped stones, there are five almost separate figures centred around the focus of the composition – the figure of the Infant Jesus. Left of the seated Virgin Mary, there is an open shed with the heads of a donkey and ox. Joseph is standing behind Mary; with a gesture of his arm, he guards the mother and leans over the child. The restless child, whom Mary cradles in her lap, holds his mother's veil with his right hand and holds out his left hand to the cup held by the kneeling King Caspar. The king has placed his crown on the ground and looks up at the faces of Mary and Joseph. Behind the kneeling oldest Wise Man there stands the middle figure, Melchior, who bears a small decorated chest of gold. Behind him there stands Balthazar, who is clearly holding a vessel filled with incense. The hem of his cloak is inscribed with the monogram AI.

The overall composition is based on a print by Master E.S. and Martin Schongauer, and the style of its carving is formally connected with that of the Master of the Kefermarkt Altarpiece. The strongly ornamental stylisation of the hair, whiskers and crumpled folds of the clothes is typical of his work. Jesus's and Balthazar's fluttering drapery could have its source of inspiration in the early work of Lucas Cranach the Elder.

The Three Kings, who are portrayed as representatives of the three continents that were known at that time (Europe, Asia and Africa) were first-hand witnesses to the Epiphany and announced hope throughout the world. According to medieval ideas, they could hope for early salvation. Sculpture signatures also appear on the scenes of the Adoration from the workshops of other sculptors. It can be assumed that, with the depiction of this scene, the sculptor identifies with the harbingers of the Gospel.

This work, which was ascribed in earlier literature to the Master of the Lamentation from Žebrák, stands out from regional sculpture production. It could have been made by Master Alexander, who most probably came to Bohemia from the Upper Rhineland and was a member of the České Budějovice guild of goldsmiths, painters and sculptors. The conception and modelling of the relief, the genre motif of the restless child and the typology of the figures, have a close affinity to the stylistic circle of the Viennese followers of Nicolaus Gerhaert van Leyden. In contrast to the works of the Master of the Žebrák Lamentation, the relief of the Adoration is characterised by a celebratory style free of pathos as well as by precise carving that features details observed from reality (the wrinkles and the suppleness of the child's body).

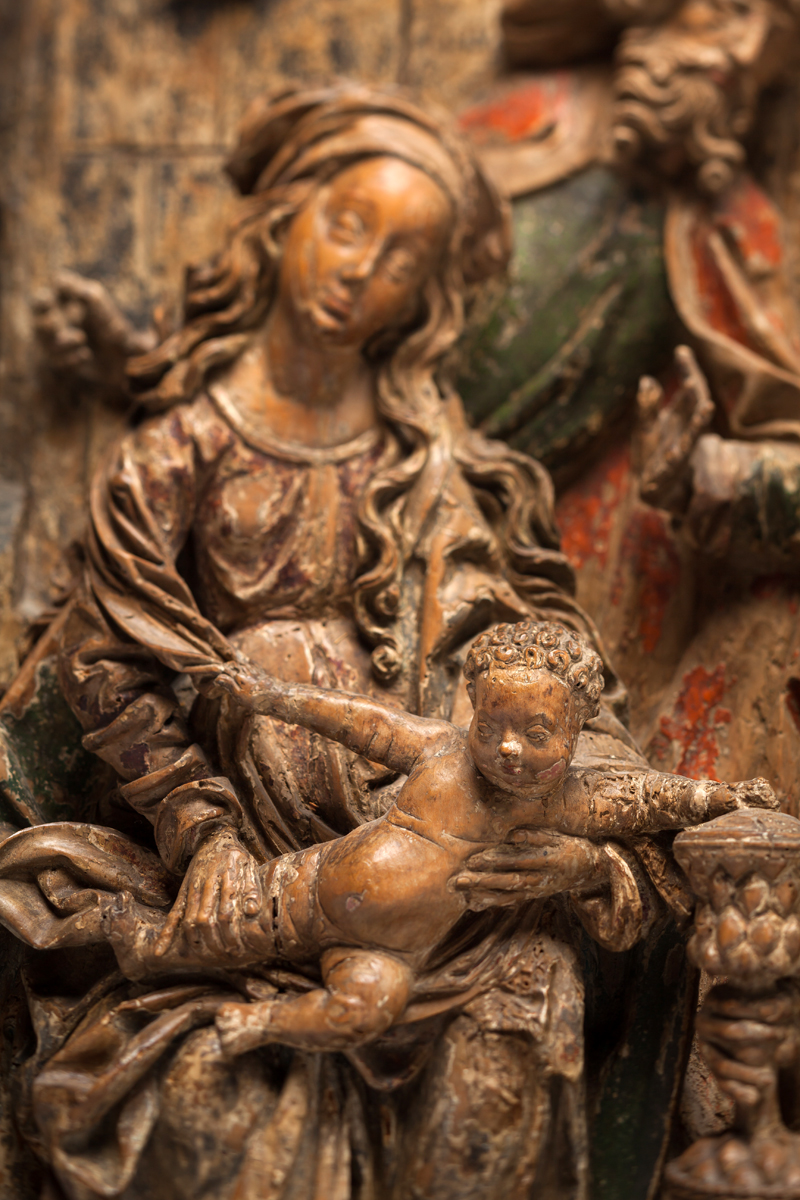

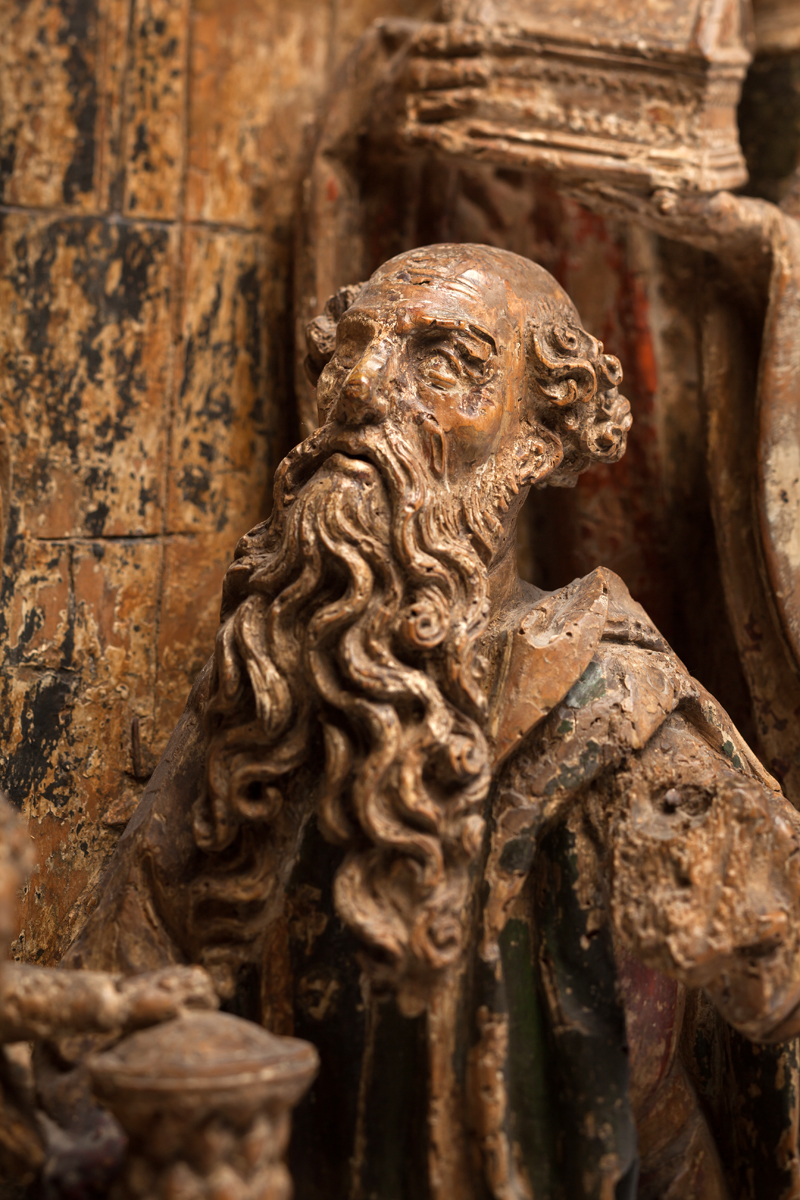

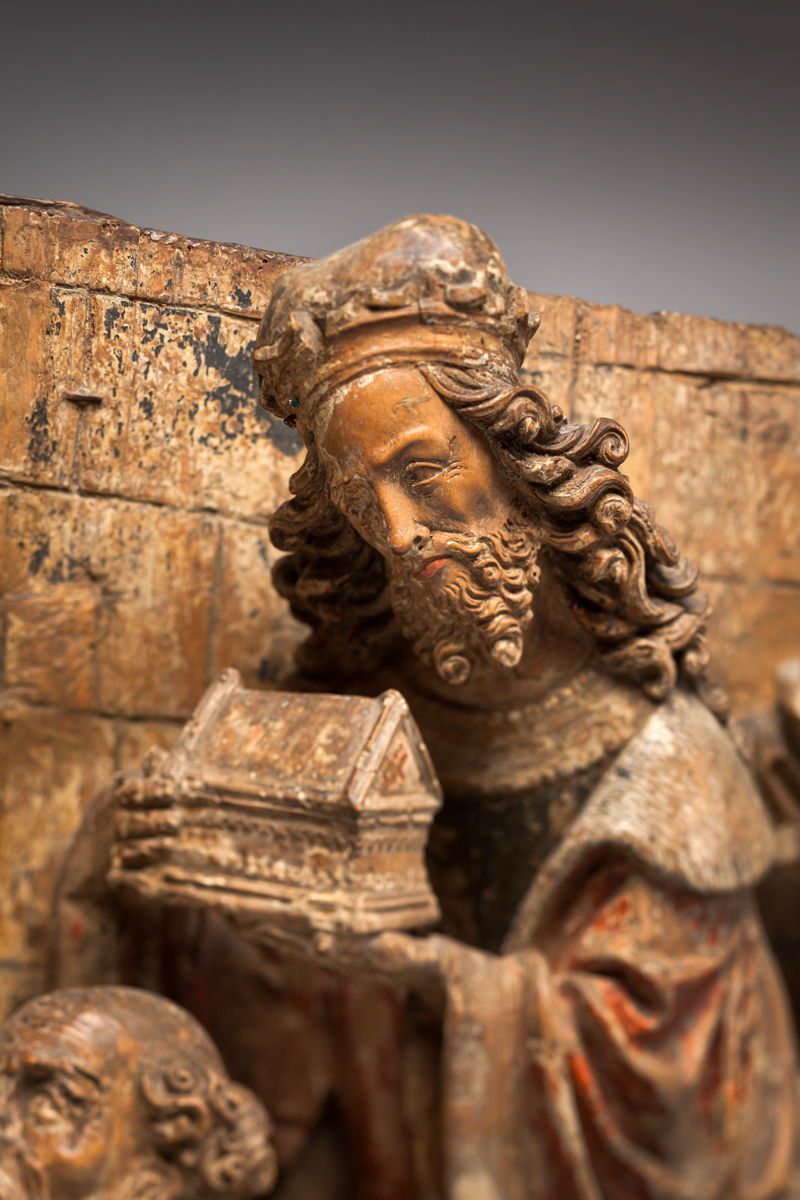

== Sources ==
- Inv. no. P-284, AJG Hluboká
- Hynek Látal, Petra Lexová, Martin Vaněk, Meziprůzkumy, Sbírka AJG 1300–2016, č. 29, AJG Hluboká nad Vltavou 2016, ISBN 978-80-87799-52-9
- Aleš Mudra, Milada Ottová, Monogramista AI – Alexander Obenstein (?): Klanění tří králů z českých Budějovic, in: Jindra P, Ottová M, (ed.), Obrazy krásy a spásy, Gotika v jihozápadních Čechách, s.341-345, Arbor Vitae, ISBN 978-80-7467-059-6 a Západočeská galerie v Plzni 2013, ISBN 978-80-86415-93-2
- Hynek Rulíšek, Gotické umění jižních Čech, Průvodce, sv. 3, Alšova jihočeská galerie v Hluboké nad Vltavou 1989, ISBN 80-900057-6-4
- Hynek Rulíšek, Gotické umění v jižních Čechách, Národní galerie v Praze 1989, ISBN 80-7035-013-X
- Jaroslav Kadlec, Špitál sv. Václava v Českých Budějovicích. Acta regionalia. 1970–1971, s. 65–76.
- Albert Kutal, K výstavě jihočeská pozdní gotika 1450–1530, Umění XIV, 1966
- Jiří Kropáček, in: Katalog plastiky, Jihočeská pozdní gotika 1450–1530, s. 210–212, Alšova jihočeská galerie, Hluboká nad Vltavou 1965

== Adoration in paintings ==
- Adoration of the Magi (Lorenzo Monaco), 1420–1422
- Adoration of the Magi (Gentile da Fabriano), 1423
- Dombild Altarpiece (Stefan Lochner), 1440
- Adoration of the Magi (Mantegna) 1462
- Monforte Altarpiece (Hugo van der Goes), 1470
- Adoration of the Magi (Botticelli, 1475)
- Adoration of the Magi (Leonardo), 1481
- Adoration of the Magi (Bosch, Madrid), 1485–1500
- Adoration of the Magi (Dürer), 1504
