= Frauenberg (Bavaria) =

Mountain in Germany

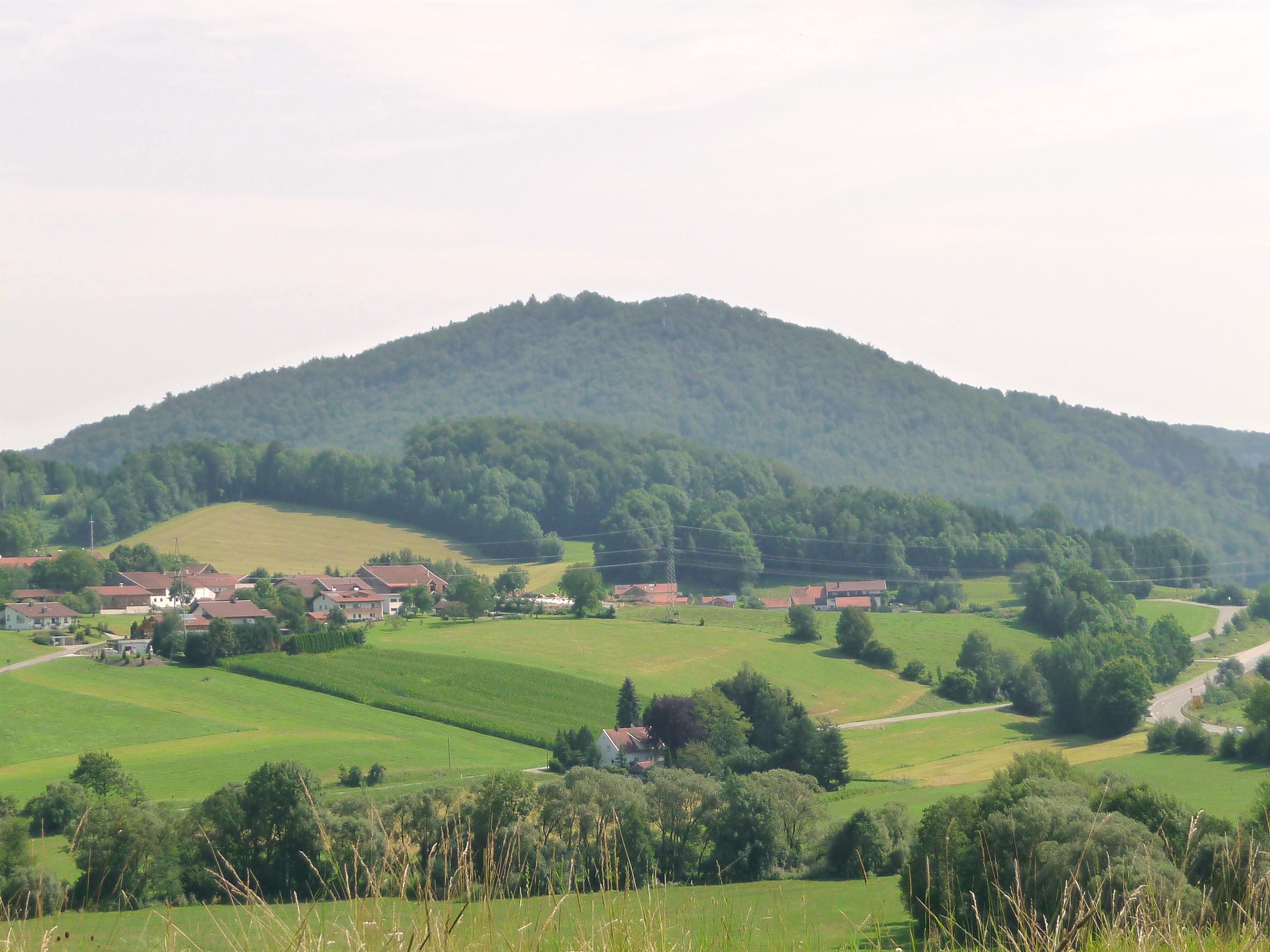
- Frauenberg

Highest point
- Elevation: 728 m (2,388 ft)
- Coordinates: 48°50′37″N 13°22′48″E

Geography
- Location: Bavaria, Germany
- Parent range: Bavarian Forest

Frauenberg is a 728 meter mountain in the Bavarian Forest, close to Grafenau in Bavaria, Germany.

Despite its inferior height, it is a recognizable part of the environment, as its conical form distinguishes it from the surrounding mountains of the Bavarian Forest. The Kleine Ohe (also Grafenauer Ohe) at this point crosses the Pfahl in the Elsenthaler Leite. Its more plain northern and eastern flank is foremost vegetated by spruces, whereas the more cliffy western and southern flanks going towards the Kleine Ohe are more grown over with deciduous forest, dominated by common beech, largeleaf linden and sycamore maple. In 1978, a natural reserve of 19.5ha was established between 460m and 560m elevation. Additionally, there is one known viewing point on the southern side.

To the pilgrimage chapel of Brudersbrunn, being located in the forest north of the peak, stations of the cross lead upwards from Grafenau.The chapel was constructed in 1842, on the spot where 1803 the former one was destroyed. The baroque Icon (1704) was stolen in 1969, together with some votive offerings and angel-formed candelabra.
