= Frauenberg (Hesse) =

Hill in Germany

Coordinates: 50°45′23″N 8°47′15″E

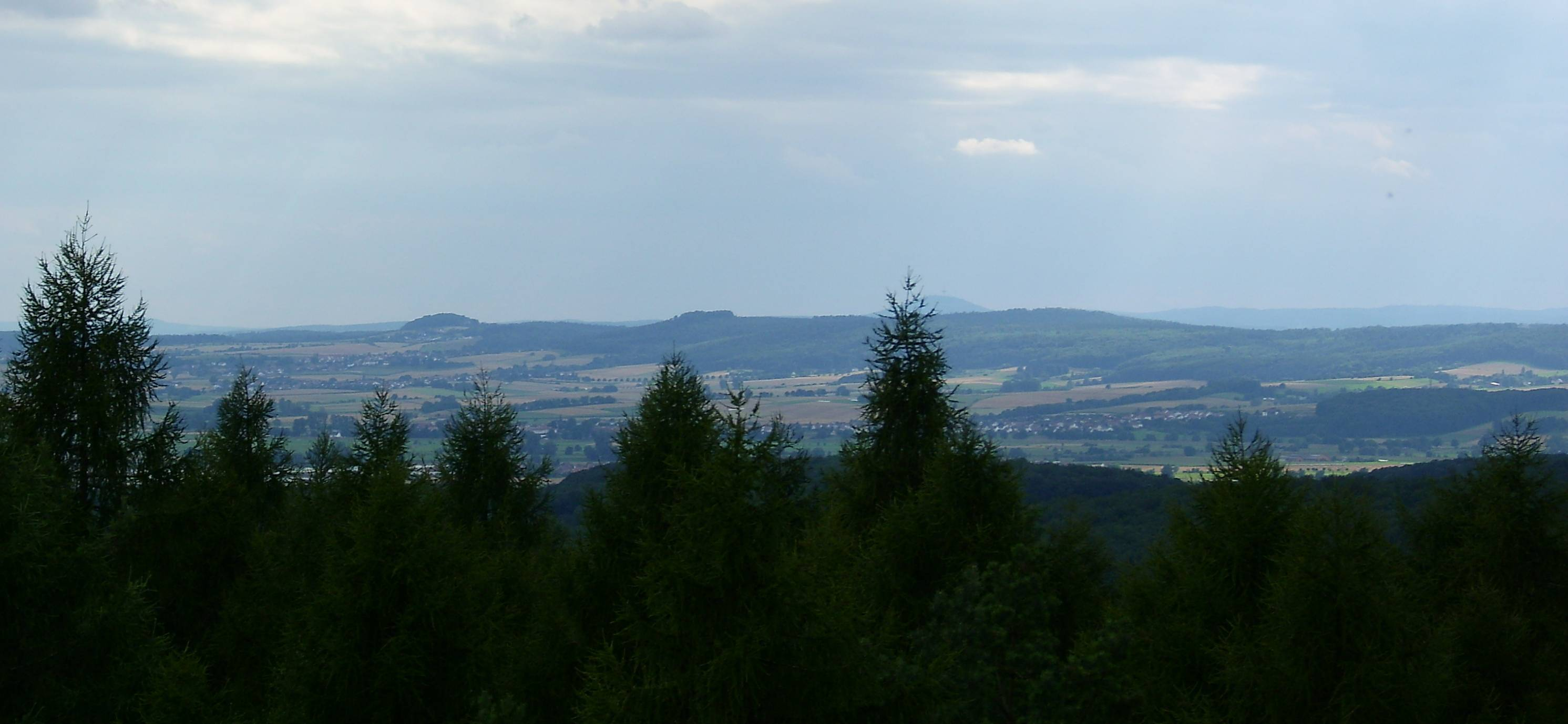
- View from the 380m high Burgholz (Gilserberger Höhen) to the southern Lahnberge with Frauenberg (379m, half left), Stempel (365m, center) and Lichtem Küppel (368m, half right) as well as to the Dünsberg (498m) behind it, right of the center) and others Elevations of the Gladenbacher Bergland (right), 2008

Highest point
- Elevation: 379.4 m (1,245 ft)

Geography
- Location: Hesse, Germany

The Frauenberg is a hill in Hesse, Germany. It is situated south of Marburg.
