= Bayerwald-Ticket =

The Bayerwald-Ticket (lit: Bavarian Forest ticket) is a special, low-cost, local railway ticket introduced in 1999 for the counties (Landkreise) of Regen and Freyung-Grafenau in the Bavarian Forest in southeast Germany. Until 2003 it was only valid between May and October; from 2004 it has been valid all-year round.

== History ==
The Bayerwald-Ticket emerged as a common fare for various German public transport networks that were aimed at tourists.

As a result, in 1995 a dense network of daily bus line routes, using the so-called Igel buses (hedgehog buses), was established for hikers during the summer season from May to October by the Bavarian Forest National Park and the towns of Spiegelau, Grafenau, Neuschönau and Mauth.

In 1997 the Regentalbahn took over traffic operations on the Plattling-Zwiesel-Bayerisch Eisenstein, as well as its two branches to Bodenmais and Grafenau. Finally the line was refurbished, new vehicles were bought and regular services were gradually introduced on all three lines.

In the area of Zwiesel a similar bus service concept to that in the southern part of the Bavarian Forest was adopted on two of the routes using the Falkenstein buses.

In order to enable the use of these three transport systems to be simpler and more comfortable, the counties introduced a standard day ticket for buses and trains. In addition to this fare they published a common timetable booklet. At first this offer was only available during the summer season. After ski buses were laid on in winter by both the Igel and Falkenstein buses, from 2004 the ticket was made available all-year round and the timetable produced in summer and winter editions.

== Fares ==
The ticket currently costs €16 per day (as of 2026). And has been priced previously at €7 per day (as at 2013) and covers the railway and bus lines within the aforementioned counties as well as the Regentalbahn railway between Bad Kötzting and Lam in Landkreis Cham. The supplementary fare Bayerwald-Ticket-plus, at €14, is also valid on the line between Gotteszell and Plattling in the Landkreis Deggendorf. A family ticket was also offered for a while, but later withdrawn.

Since the Regentalbahn has extended its operations via Bayerisch Eisenstein station on several of its services to the Czech town of Špičák and the Regionalbus Ostbayern (RBO) introduced an express bus from Železná Ruda to Passau, the ticket has been extended to cover these routes in the Czech Republic as well.

== Prices ==
Ticket price
| Year | Price |
| 2001 | 9 DM (ca. 4.60 euros) |
| 2006 | 5 euros |
| 2007 | 6 euros |
| 2008 | 7 euros |
| 2026 | 16 euros |
