= Bavarian Forest Railway =

Railway line in Germany

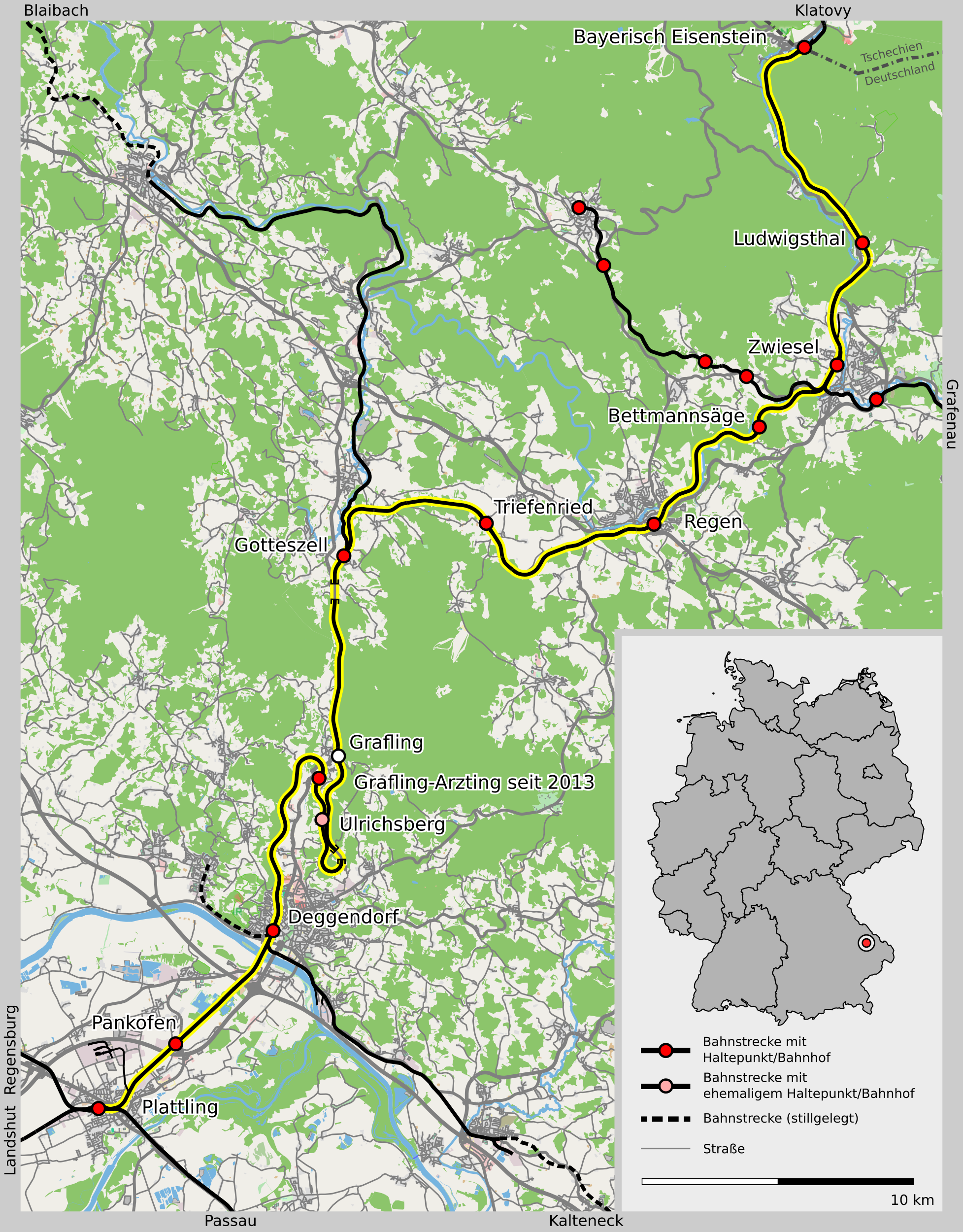

Overview
- Native name: Bayerische Waldbahn
- Line number: 5634

Service
- Route number: 905

Technical
- Line length: 71.7 km (44.6 mi)
- Track gauge: 1,435 mm (4 ft 8 1/2 in) standard gauge
- Maximum incline: 1.25%

The Bavarian Forest Railway (Bayerische Waldbahn often just called the Waldbahn) (KBS 905) links the heart of the Bavarian Forest around Regen and Zwiesel to Plattling and the Danube valley on one side, and the Czech Republic through Bayerisch Eisenstein on the other. In the Danube valley it forms a junction with the Nuremberg–Regensburg–Passau long-distance railway (KBS 880) and, to the south, regional lines to Landshut and Munich (KBS 931).

== History ==
In 1867 the Bavarian state began first investigating the possibility of a railway link from Plattling via Deggendorf, Regen und Zwiesel to the Bohemian border to provide transportation for the industries there. The Bavarian-Austrian state treaty of 21 June 1851 envisaged a junction with the Bohemian railway network at Eisenstein in addition to the existing connections to Bohemia at Furth im Wald and Passau. The Pilsen–Priesen(–Komotau) railway was prepared to extend their Pilsen–Dux line as far as the border at Eisenstein.

On the initiative of several local people the Bavarian Eastern Railway Company (Bayerische Ostbahn) were given authority by the Bavarian concession of 25 November 1872 to build the railway line. As a result, the Ostbahn dropped plans under a previously granted concession of 3 August 1869 for the construction of a route from Straubing to Cham. Preparation for construction of the new line began as early as 1873. The search for a suitable route was extraordinarily difficult due to the steep climb from the Danube into the Bavarian Forest and the numerous valleys that had to be crossed. This promised to make the line expensive to build and not particularly profitable. On the other hand, with a better link from the new line from Plattling through the Isar valley to Munich there was the attraction of a lucrative connexion with Bohemia. In 1874 work started on its construction.

== Construction of the line ==
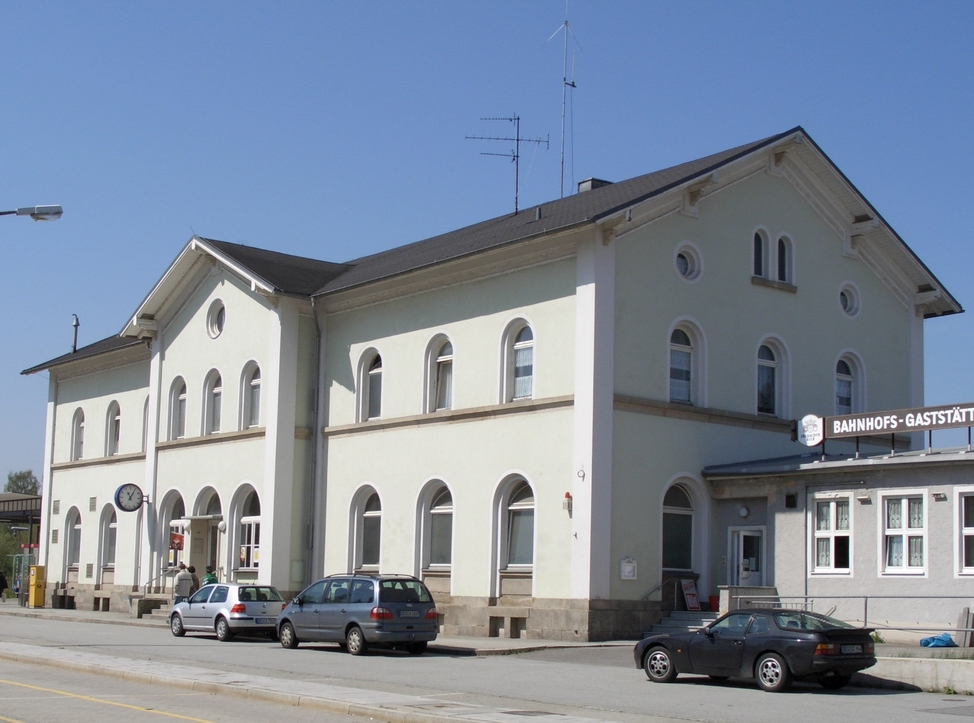
Deggendorf station

At Plattling station the line branched off northwards from the Regensburg–Passau main line to Deggendorf and crossed the Danube there. As a result, Plattling station was relocated to the west and a new facility erected. The privately operated 8.7 km long Deggendorf–Plattling goods line, which had been opened on 1 March 1866, was broken up. Its two 2/2 coupled tank locomotives, delivered in 1866 by Maffei with the names DEGGENDORF and BAYER. WALD, were taken over by the Royal Bavarian State Railways as Class D IIs, nos. 1176 and 1177. Both engines were retired in 1895.

For the ramp from Deggendorf (320 m or 1,050 ft AMSL) to the heights around Gotteszell (600 m or 1,969 ft AMSL), two options were investigated. One was a direct link via Hirschberg with an incline of 2%, the other was longer but clearly less steep with an incline of only 1.25%. In spite of its higher construction costs, the latter was chosen because, long term, it would offer more economical and faster operation utilising a double loop line between Oberkandelbach and Grafling and the tunnel at Ulrichsberg. The valleys along the line of the railway would be crossed on long bridges or long, high embankments.

The most important structures on the route:

- Danube bridge at Deggendorf 365 m long
- Kohlbach embankment at Grafling 390 m long 44 m high
- Kühberg loop tunnel at Ulrichsberg 475 m long
- Hochbühl tunnel at Gotteszell 569 m long
- Ohe bridge at Regen 308 m long 48 m high
- Regen bridge at Regen 114 m long 25 m high
- Regen bridge at Zwiesel 135 m long 14 m high
- Deffernik bridge at Ludwigsthal 102 m long 30 m high

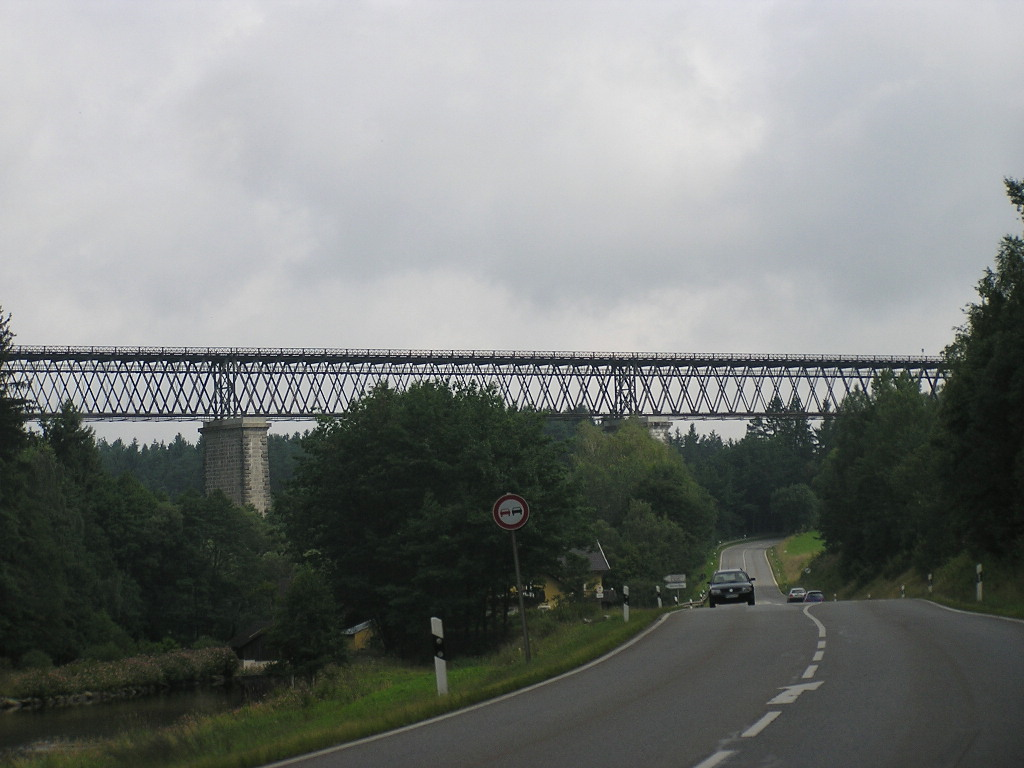
The Ohe bridge at Regen

At 48m, the Ohe bridge is the second highest railway bridge in Bavaria, just behind the Königswart bridge (height 50 m, length 279 m) at Wasserburg am Inn. On the state border the two railway companies built a very large station building at Bayerisch Eisenstein, the border running right through the middle of the building. The line was laid as a single track, but the route was prepared for two tracks. However it has remained single to the present day because the junction to the Mühldorf (Obb)–Plattling line, opened in 1875, and the Pilsting–Landshut link line, taken into service in 1880, did not bring the anticipated growth in traffic for the Waldbahn and across the border.

During the construction of the line, Bavaria decided to nationalise the Ostbahn in a law passed on 15 April 1875. This took place on 10 May 1875 and led to a merger with the Royal Bavarian State Railways on 1 January 1876. As a result, the Plattling–Deggendorf–Gotteszell–Regen–Zwiesel–Ludwigsthal route was taken into service by the Bavarian state railway on 16 September 1877. After the completion of the Deffernik bridge the entire 74.7 km long route to Eisenstein was opened on 15 November 1877.

On the Czech side the line from Neuern to Eisenstein had been finished and taken into service on 20 October 1877. The station building, whose construction had been agreed by the two railway companies on 17 May 1877, was not completed until 1878. The building at Bayerisch Eisenstein/Železná Ruda-Alžbětín was built directly on the border line and serves for both Czech and Bavarian companies.

== Connecting lines ==
The central region of the Bavarian Forest was opened up even more to the railways through the construction of a number of branch lines:

- On 1 September 1890 Zwiesel–Grafenau railway, 31.5 km long, opened by the Royal Bavarian State Railways (today KBS 906)
- On 10 November 1890 Gotteszell–Viechtach railway, 25 km long, opened by the AG Lokalbahn Gotteszell–Viechtach, and extended in 1928 to Blaibach where it joined the state-run Cham–Kötzting line opened in 1892
- On 1. October 1891 Deggendorf–Metten, 4.2 km long, opened by the Lokalbahn Deggendorf–Metten AG.
- On 26 November 1913 Deggendorf–Hengersberg, 11.6 km long, opened by the Bavarian state railways, extended to Kalteneck and joined to the state-operated Passau–Freyung line opened in 1890/92
- On 3 September 1928 Zwiesel–Bodenmais railway, 14.5 km long, opened by the Deutsche Reichsbahn (today KBS 907)

== Train services ==
On 31 January 1877 the Bavarian state railway ordered six, very powerful, 0-6-0 tank locomotives from the Lokomotivfabrik Maffei in Munich. A month after opening the Forest railway it ordered 4 more engines which were delivered in February and March 1878. They were given the names Ulrichsberg, Gotteszell, Ludwigsthal and Eisenstein. The Reichsbahn gave them the numbers 89 8107 to 110 and they were retired between 1925 and 1928. These tank engines were employed on the Waldbahn for many years, predominantly on goods duties. Passenger services were initially hauled by the two Ostbahn engines, E 1 and E 2, tender locomotives with a 0-4-0 wheel arrangement. Then, according to von Welser (see Sources), the former Ostbahn 2-4-0 Class B engines were deployed here for passenger duties. They were redesignated as Class B V by the state railway and given numbers 1003–1068.

On 15 May 1880 four pairs of passenger trains per day ran on the Forest Railway. Two faster pairs of trains made connexions with Prague and ran to and from Landau. They needed 2 hours 20 minutes for the Eisenstein–Plattling run, the other pairs of trains took 4 hours.

In May 1897 four trains ran daily from Eisenstein to Plattling and five in the opposite direction. The journey time was between 2 and 2 ½ hours. However, there was also a train to Eisenstein, presumably hauling goods wagons, that needed 5 hours for the journey. One pair of trains had 1st to 3rd class through coaches for the Landshut–Pilsen service. Two other pairs of trains ran on the Deggendorf–Pilsting–Neumarkt–Mühldorf–Rosenheim route. There was no through service to Landshut.

In October 1913 the timetable now offered a service from Landshut via Landau to Eisenstein instead of the previous Eisenstein–Plattling–Rosenheim one. Five pairs of trains ran daily on the Plattling–Eisenstein section with 2nd and 3rd class coaches. In the direction of Eisenstein the trains needed about 2 hours 20 minutes, in the direction of Plattling only 1 hour 40 minutes to 2 hours. A further 4 train pairs ran daily between Deggendorf and Landshut. One had to change in Landau for Mühldorf/Rosenheim. No through coaches to Bohemia are listed.

In 1936 the Deutsche Reichsbahn recorded in its timetable, route number 426 Landshut–Plattling–Eisenstein, 7 train pairs daily, of which 6 ran to and from Landshut. These trains also ran with 2nd class coaches. Because the transportation of luggage and bicycles was limited on two of the pairs of trains, these may have been railbuses. An early train worked the line in 1 hour and 30 minutes, the others took about 10 to 15 minutes longer. In addition, 4 pairs of trains shuttled between Deggendorf and Plattling each day. The trains ran on to Bohemia 5 times a day, albeit always with a stop of one or more hours at Eisenstein.

=== Traffic after the Second World War ===
After the end of the Second World War, traffic to Bohemia came to a standstill. When the Iron Curtain fell, the ČSSR erected a barbed wire fence across the station yard and cut the tracks. Czech trains now terminated at the village of Železná Ruda several kilometres north of the border. The Deutsche Bundesbahn (DB) ran its trains up to the buffer stop at the border fence in Bayerisch Eisenstein station and used the southern half of the divided station building. In the building the border was closed by walls.

The DB withdrew steam operations for goods traffic in the 1970s. On 6 March 1974 the last scheduled steam locomotive service took place. Number 053 063-4 (DRB Class 50) hauled train number N 2964 from Plattling to Bayerisch Eisenstein and its return service N 2977 on 7 March.

For a long time Uerdingen railbuses and Class V 100 diesel locomotives worked the line. Until the mid-1990s parts of InterCity (IC) trains ran as far as Zwiesel, as did a travel agency special until 1987: a VT-601 train.

The border crossing of Bayerisch Eisenstein was opened again on 2 June 1991. Since then, after a short wait, one can change into České drahy (ČD) trains to Klatovy (Klattau) and Plzeň (Pilsen). During shunting both railway administrations use the track system without regard to the border.

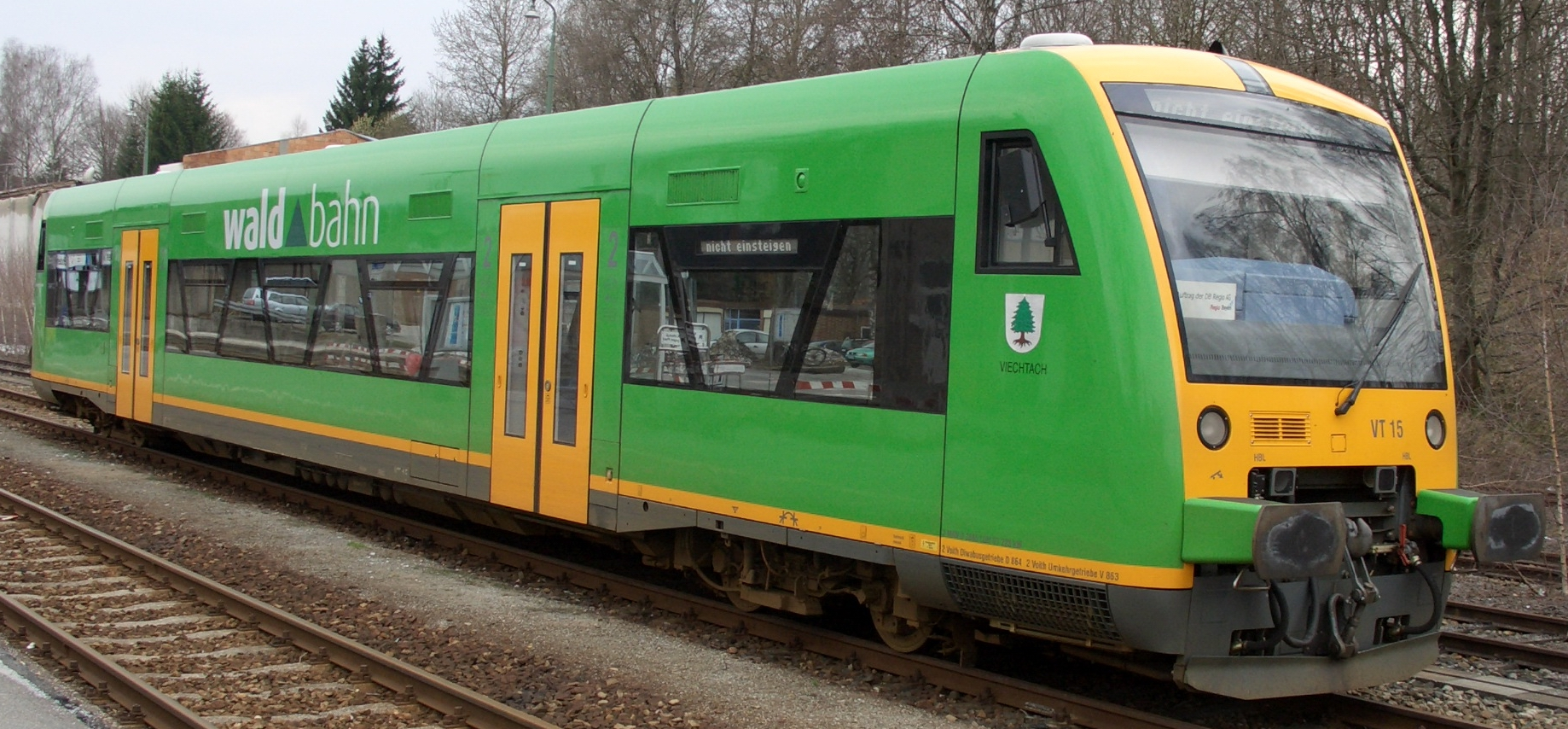
A Waldbahn VT 15 railbus at Zwiesel station

=== Railway traffic today ===
The Deggendorf–Metten branch closed in 1984 to passenger services and 1991 to goods traffic. Deggendorf–Kalteneck withdrew its passenger services in two stages: in 1972 on the Eging–Kalteneck section and in 1981 on the Deggendorf–Eging stretch; the line was subsequently lifted in 1999 (Eging–Kalteneck) and 2004 (Hengersberg–Eging). However the other branches of the Forest Railway remain. The track from Deggendorf to Hengersberg still exists. Regular passenger services from Gotteszell to Viechtach ceased on 1 May 1991. Today only vehicles going to the Regentalbahn workshop in Viechtach run along it. In addition, mainly in the summer months, the tourist trains of the Wanderbahn (KBS 12905) work the line with a renovated Esslingen railbus in historic livery belonging to the Regentalbahn. This typical NE railcar worked both the Zwiesel–Bodenmais and Zwiesel–Grafenau branches from 1993 to 1997.

Since 1997 the Regentalbahn has operated the Bavarian Forest railway (KBS 905) and the branches to Grafenau (KBS 906) and Bodenmais (KBS 907) under contract from DB Regio Bayern using Regio-Shuttles under the trade name Waldbahn.

Zwiesel is today the timetable hub with short waiting times just before the hour for those changing trains in any direction. The hub on the Waldbahn was transferred here from Regen several years ago. This was made possible by moving the former crossing at Ulrichsberg to a newly built crossing loop further north at Grafling. This also enabled changeover times at the timetable hub of Plattling to be shortened by 10 minutes.

Trains run to Bayerisch Eisenstein and Bodenmais from Plattling hourly; to Grafenau the railcars run every 2 hours. In the course of modernisation of the rail traffic on this route and in order to make public transit more attractive for tourists and locals, in 1999 a special fare, the Bayerwald-Ticket (Bavarian Forest Ticket) was offered. This is a day ticket that is valid on the Waldbahn lines as well as many bus routes in the counties of Regen, Freyung-Grafenau and Cham. Since December 2013 Regental Bahnbetriebs GmbH has gained the contract to run this service.(Platform 5 European Handbook No.2B German Railways Private Operators, Museums and Museum Lines)

=== Cross-border traffic ===
As the summer timetable came into force on 28 May 2006 scheduled services ran for the first time on the Waldbahn every two hours directly from Plattling via Bayerisch Eisenstein as far as the Czech station of Špičák (Spitzberg) and back. In the 2008 timetable two pairs of trains ran daily to Špičák. In addition, in the winter season there are three extra pairs of trains run on weekdays and five at weekends. In the summer three additional pairs of trains run each day.

== Expansion ==
Between 2005 and 2007 several stations were restored. All platforms were given a usable length of 100 m, so that up to four of the currently-used Regioshuttle units can stop at each platform.

In addition to small line improvements, a major change will be the construction of a new bridge over the Danube at Deggendorf. The currently operated single-tracked bridge can only continue to be used in its present state until 2011. In order to replace this, by March 2008 a new double-tracked bridge based on the foundations of the old one will be erected and the whole railway line relaid for a distance of about 2 km. The 466-metre-long (1,529 ft) bridge will be raised from 4.30 m to about 8 m in order to conform to the present-day clearances for shipping. The €32 million project should be ready by June 2010. The cost of the bridge will be borne 50/50 by the Rhine-Main-Donau Wasserstrassen and the DB Netz AG. In addition the nearby bridge over the 2074 state highway will be replaced. The town of Deggendorf will pay 80% of the €2.9 million cost for that, the rest will be picked up DB Netz.

The time gained, as a result of the new bridge, by up trains will be used at the crossing point of Grafling, where currently the down trains have to wait several minutes, and where a new station "Grafling-Arzting" was built in 2013 not far from the old one at Grafling which has been closed.

== See also ==
- List of scheduled railway routes in Germany
- Royal Bavarian State Railways

== Sources ==
- Kandler, Udo, Eisenbahnen im Bayerischen Wald, Fürstenfeldbruck, 1996, ISBN 3-922404-89-8
- Wolfgang Klee/Ludwig v. Welser, Bayern-Report, Bände 1–5, Fürstenfeldbruck, 1993–1995.
- Dt. Reichsbahn, Die deutschen Eisenbahnen in ihrer Entwicklung 1835–1935, Berlin, 1935.
- Bräunlein, Manfred, Die Ostbahnen, Königlich privilegiert und bayerisch, Von den Anfängen bis zur Verstaatlichung 1851 bis 1875, Nürnberg 2000, ISBN 3-88929-078-7
