= Bayerisch Eisenstein railway station =

Railway station on the German–Czech border

Bayerisch Eisenstein Železná Ruda-Alžbětín
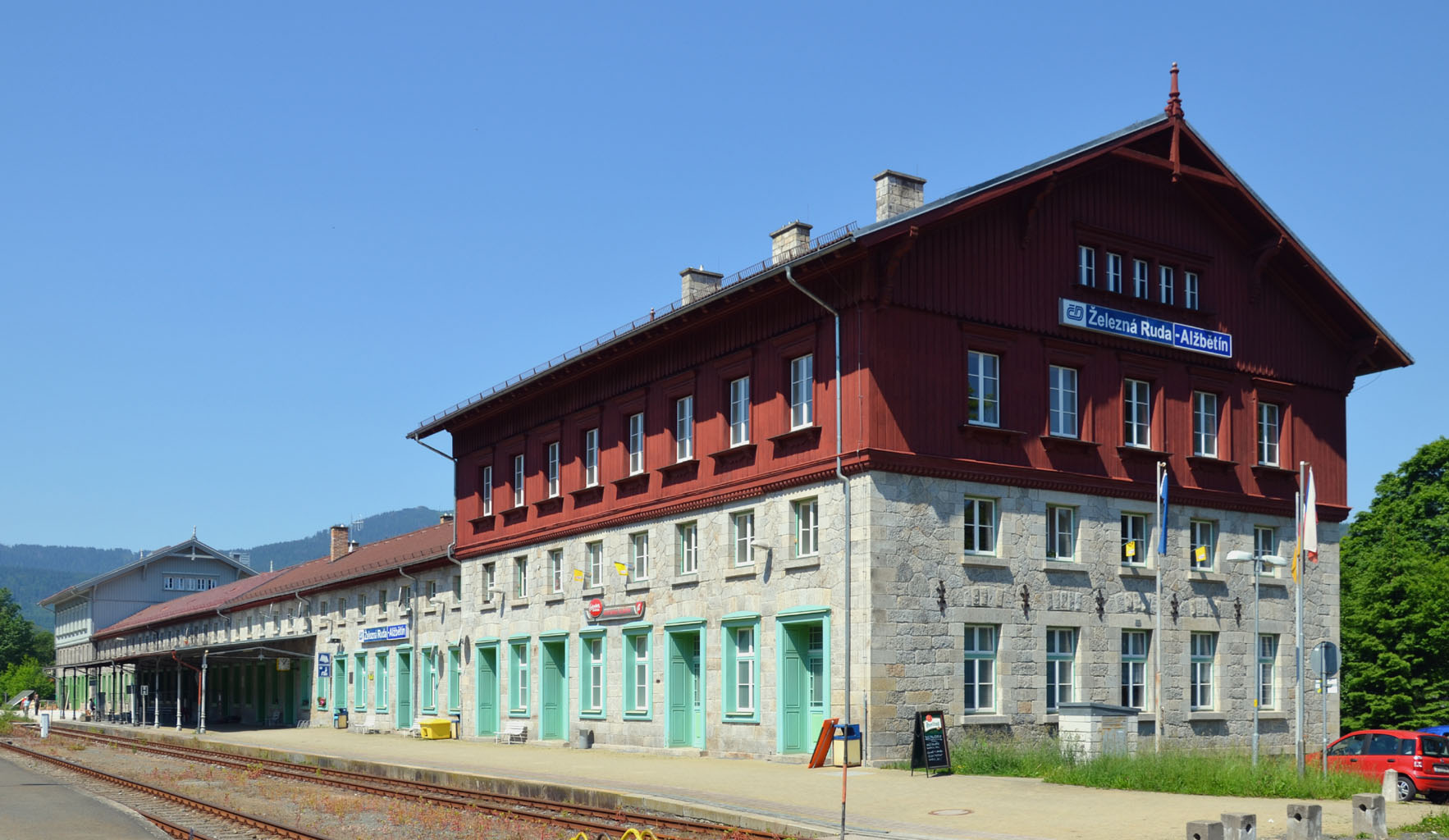
- Bayerisch Eisenstein / Železná Ruda-Alžbětín station in June 2012

General information
- Location: Czech Republic border with Germany
- Coordinates: 49°7′18″N 13°12′32″E
- Elevation: 722 metres (2,369 ft)
- Owner: Deutsche Bahn/Správa železnic
- Operator: DB Netz; DB Station&Service; Správa železnic
- Lines: Bavarian Forest Railway (KBS 905); Plzeň–Železná Ruda railway line
- Platforms: 3

Construction
- Accessible: Yes

Other information
- Website: www.bahnhof.de

History
- Opened: 20 October 1877

Services
Preceding station		Following station
Ludwigsthal towards Plattling	RB 35	Terminus
Preceding station	České dráhy	Following station
Terminus	R	Železná Ruda centrum towards Praha hl.n.
Terminus	Sp	Železná Ruda centrum towards Plzeň main
Terminus	Os	Železná Ruda centrum towards Klatovy
Location
- Location within Bavaria Location within Germany Location within Europe

Bayerisch Eisenstein/Železná Ruda-Alžbětín station (German: Bahnhof Bayerisch Eisenstein, Czech: Nádraží Železná Ruda-Alžbětín) is a railway station on the border of southeast Germany and the Czech Republic. It forms the junction between the Bavarian Forest railway from Plattling to Bayerisch Eisenstein, which was started in 1874 by the Bavarian Eastern Railway Company (or Bavarian Ostbahn) and completed by the Royal Bavarian State Railways, and the Pilsen–Markt Eisenstein (today: Plzeň–Železná Ruda) railway built by the Pilsen–Priesen(–Komotau) railway in what was then Bohemia. The national border between Germany and the Czech Republic runs through the middle of the station building.

== Construction ==
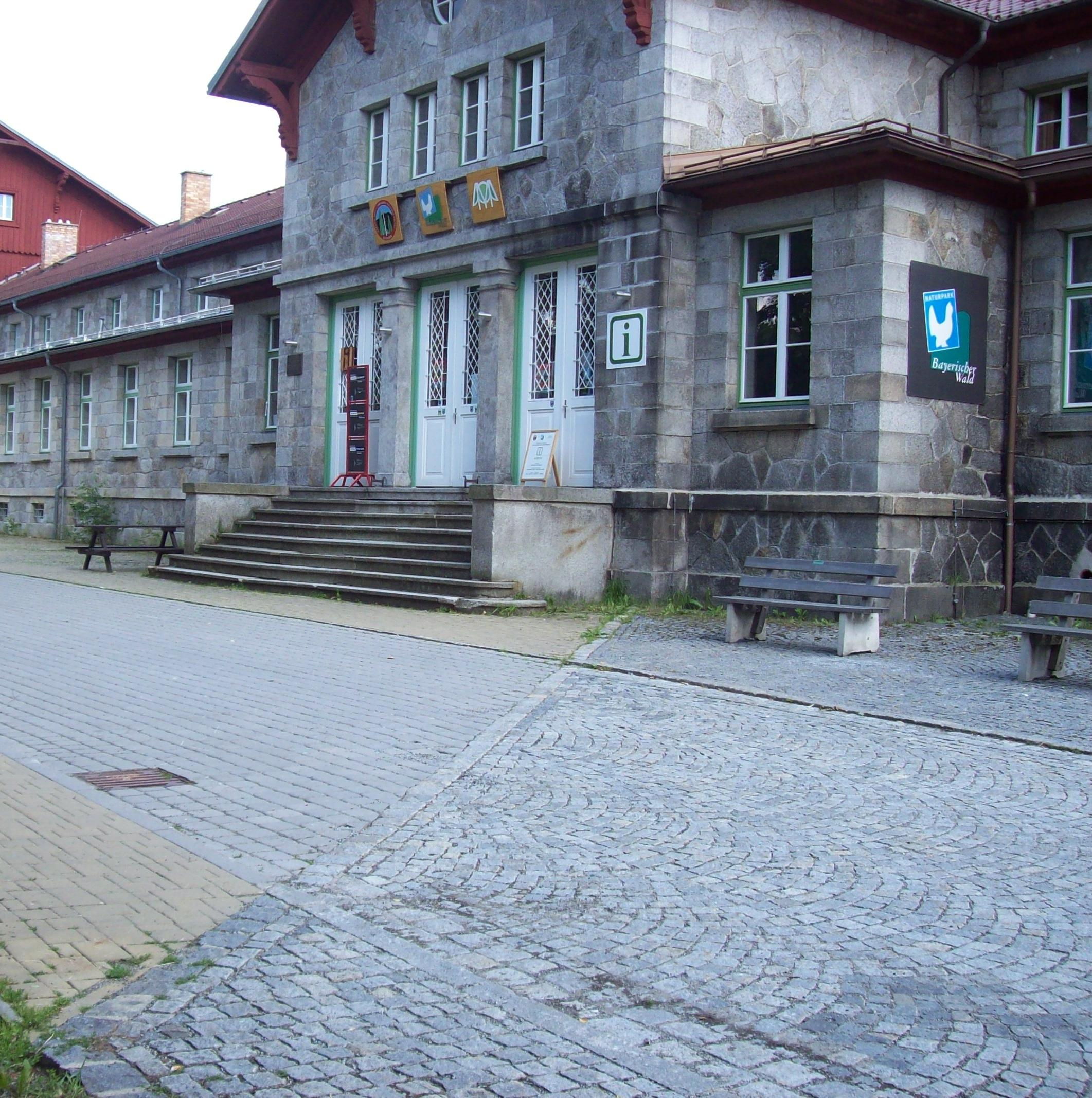
Station building with the line on the road marking the border

The basis for this railway junction was the Bavarian-Austrian state treaty of 21 June 1851. On the Bohemian side, the Pilsen–Priesen(–Komotau) railway company built the missing section from Neuern to Eisenstein station and opened it on 20 October 1877. On the German side, after the Bavarian Ostbahn was nationalised on 10 May 1875, the line was completed by the Royal Bavarian State Railways and the last section from Ludwigsthal to Eisenstein was opened to railway traffic on 15 November 1877.

Not until just before the completion of the railway lines, did the two railway administrations agree, on 17 May 1877, details of the very large station building and extensive track system needed for the transfer of goods and passengers. This required the local terrain to be filled with over 250,000 m^{3} of earth and levelled off. The station building was built with its centre section exactly on the border. On either side was an adjoining wing belonging to the respective railway company. The waiting room was designed in a way that was very representative of the style of that era. In the first class waiting room is the largest surviving planked ceiling of its type - a so-called "Cologne ceiling" (Kölner Decke). The station was completed in 1878. On its southern side, west of the track network, that had 9 tracks to begin with and later 11, is the roundhouse with its turntable. Today it houses the Bavarian Localbahn (=branch line) Museum in which the Bavarian Localbahn Society stables more than 20 vehicles from the Lokalbahn era.

The railway line was conceived as the shortest link between Prague and Munich, but because of the steep inclines and tight curves, especially on the Bohemian side, it never attained its intended importance. There was no cross-border traffic until 2006, even after the forced annexation of the Sudetenland into the German Reich in 1938. Only around the turn of the 20th century, in 1900, did through coaches run along the route for a few years from Munich to Prague. Through goods traffic restricted itself to the region.

== Iron Curtain ==
After the end of the Second World War cross-border traffic came to a complete standstill. In 1953 a wire fence was erected across the station yard by Czechoslovakia and the tracks were severed. Even in the station building itself the border was blocked by walls. Czech passenger services now terminated several kilometres to the north of the border at Železná Ruda (Markt Eisenstein) station. The Deutsche Bundesbahn (DB) ran its trains up to the buffer stop by the border fence and used the southern half of the divided station building. DB steam services to Bayerisch Eisenstein ended for both passenger and goods traffic in the 1970s. For a long time thereafter, railbuses were used; these were later replaced by diesel locomotives hauling silver Silberling coaches.

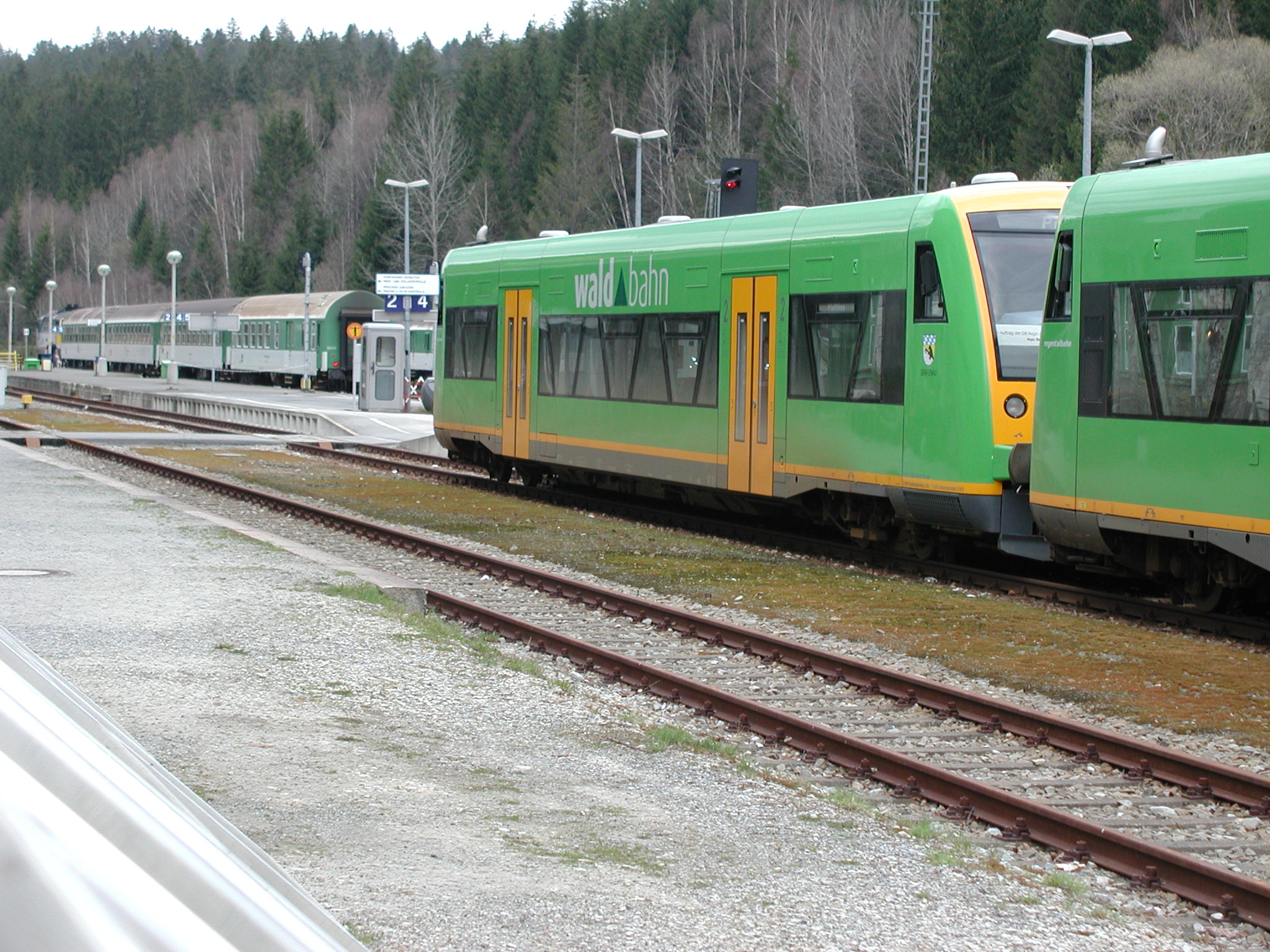
A Czech Railways train (background) waits for passengers from Plattling. (April 2005)

== Reconnection ==
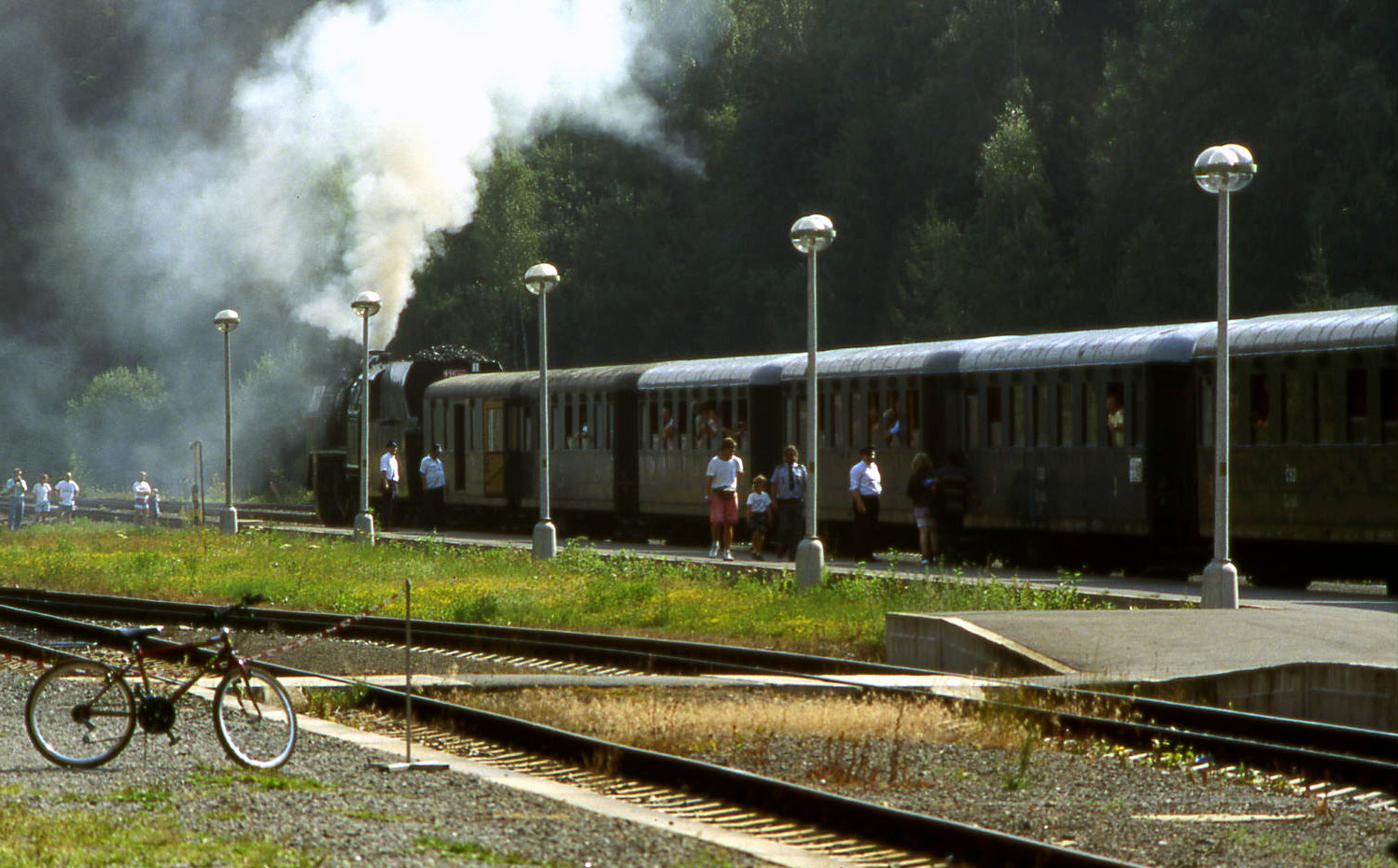
Steam train ready to cross the former 'iron curtain' in August 1995

The border crossing was opened again for rail traffic on 2 June 1991. Since then it has been possible to change for České dráhy (ČD) trains to Klatovy and Plzeň after a short wait. Shunters can use the tracks belonging to both railway administrations without worrying about crossing the border. Today on the German side the Regentalbahn runs trains under contract from DB Regio Bayern using the logo Waldbahn (Forest Railway) from Plattling via Regen and Zwiesel to Bayerisch Eisenstein. Once the signal installations of the station were prepared for cross-border services on 28 May 2006 Waldbahn Regio-Shuttles started running as far as Špičák (Spitzberg), 7 km away, where connections to Pilsen are possible. This was the first timetabled cross-border service on this line since it was built in 1877. The Bayerwald-Ticket (Bavarian Forest ticket) fare was extended to cover journeys to Špičák.

In December 2006 the former name of the Czech part of the station, Železná Ruda, was officially changed to Železná Ruda-Alžbětín.

== Services ==
As of the December 2024 timetable change, the following services stop at Bayerisch Eisenstein:

- České dráhy: Service every two hours to Klatovy, twice per day to Prague, and twice per day to Plzeň.
- Waldbahn: hourly service to Plattling.

== See also ==
- Czech rail border crossings
- Bavarian Localbahn Society
