= Plzeň hlavní nádraží =

Railway station in Plzeň, Czech Republic

Coordinates: 49.7436°N 13.3881°E

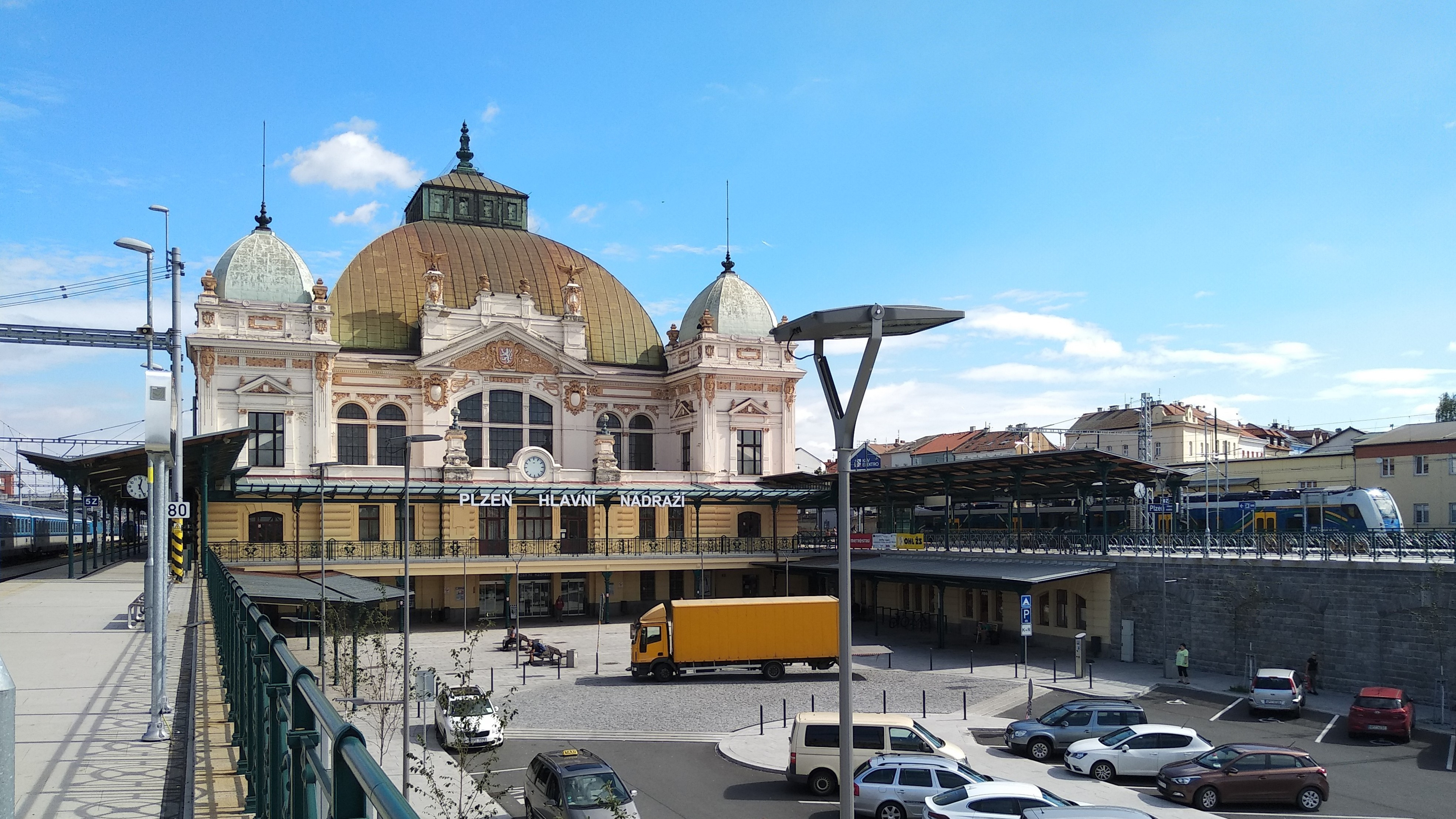
- Main entrance

General information
- Location: Plzeň, Nádražní 9 Czech Republic
- Owner: Czech Republic
- Platforms: 6
- Connections: Plzeň tramway, Plzeň trolleybuses

Construction
- Architect: Rudolf Štech
- Architectural style: Art Nouveau

Other information
- Station code: 54732750

History
- Opened: 1862
- Rebuilt: 1907

Services
Preceding station	Czech Railways	Following station
Stříbro toward Františkovy Lázně	Supercity Pendolino	Praha-Smíchov toward Bohumín
Holýšov toward Munich	Arriva-Länderbahn-Express	Praha-Smíchov toward Prague
Stříbro toward Cheb	Regional fast trains	Rokycany toward Prague
Plzeň zastávka toward Železná Rudá–Alžbětín	Regional fast trains	Rokycany toward Prague
Terminus	Regional fast trains	Nepomuk toward České Budějovice or Brno hl.n.
Plzeň–Jižní předměstí toward Domažlice, Stříbro or Bezdružice	Stopping trains	Terminus
Plzeň zastávka toward Železná Rudá–Alžbětín	Stopping trains	Terminus
Terminus	Stopping trains	Plzeň–Bílá Hora toward Žatec or Rakovník
Terminus	Stopping trains	Plzeň–Doubravka toward Beroun
Terminus	Stopping trains	Plzeň–Koterov toward Nepomuk
Location

Plzeň hlavní nádraží (abbreviated Plzeň hl.n.; English: Plzeň main railway station) is the central station in Plzeň in the Czech Republic. It is located in the Slovany district near the city centre. The station was opened in 1862, together with the Czech Western Railway from Prague to Plzeň. The station has six platforms for train transport and one platform for buses. There are also tram and trolleybus stops. The station is electrified.

As of 8 March 2023, the station is undergoing major reconstruction.

== History ==
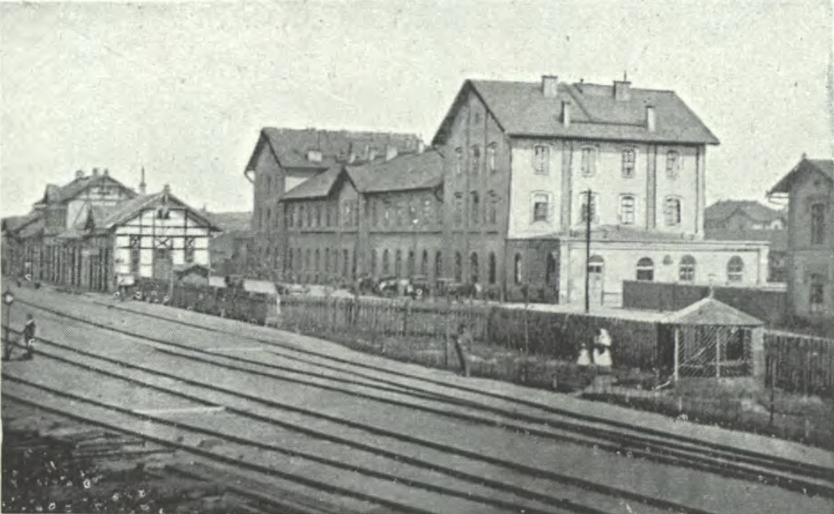
Building of Old railway station complex, cca 1890. Demolished and replaced by a new building.

The current building of the Plzeň main railway station was opened in 1907. It is an Art Nouveau building designed by Rudolf Štech. Rudolf Štech also co-financed construction of the railway building and due to debt, he committed suicide in 1908.

On 17 April 1945, the building was heavily damaged during the bombing of Plzeň by the US Army Air Forces. The bombing killed 347 people inside the station building. After World War II the building was reconstructed to its original state.

In the 1950s the building was renamed as Plzeň Gottwaldovo nádraží (English: "Plzeň Gottwald's station") in honour of the first Czechoslovak communist president Klement Gottwald. In the 1960s, the station was electrified as part of line electrification to České Budějovice. After the Velvet Revolution the station regained its original name.

Since 2000 the building has been protected as a Czech cultural monument.

In 2012, the interiors of the station building were partially reconstructed. In 2013 the first underpass for pedestrians was extended to connect Železniční street and Šumavská street with the station building. In the years 2016–2018, the platforms were reconstructed to height of 550 mm (21.7 in). In December 2018, a bus terminal was opened next to the train station. There is a newly built second underpass, which connects the bus terminal with platforms. In the years 2021–2023, a major reconstruction of the station building is planned.

== Train services ==
Plzeň is an important centre of Czech railway transport, with the crossing of five main railway lines:

- line Nr. 170: Prague – Beroun – Plzeň – Cheb
- line Nr. 180: Plzeň – Domažlice – Furth im Wald (Germany)
- line Nr. 183: Plzeň – Klatovy – Železná Ruda
- line Nr. 160: Plzeň – Žatec
- line Nr. 190: Plzeň – České Budějovice

== Local transport ==
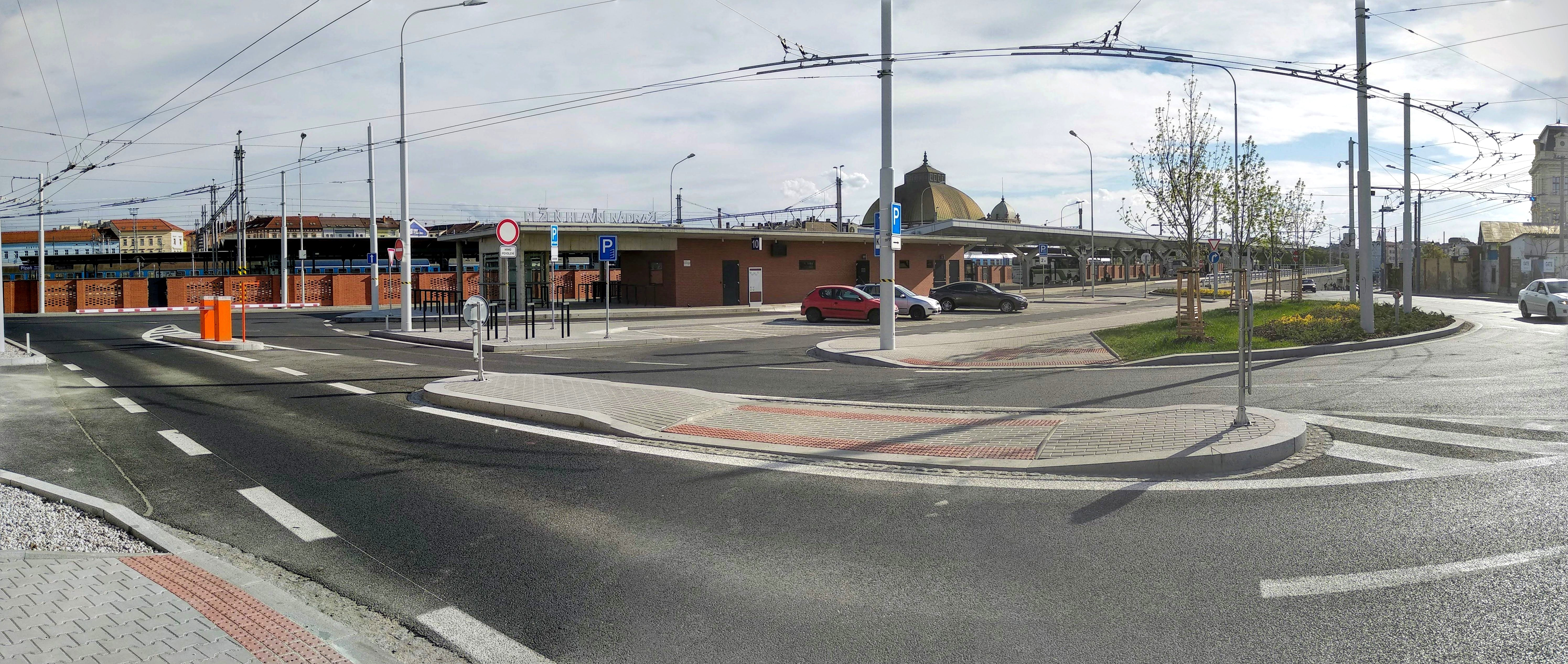
Bus terminal

The station is served by tram lines 1 and 2. There are also numerous trolleybus lines.
