= Bayerisch Eisenstein =

- Municipality
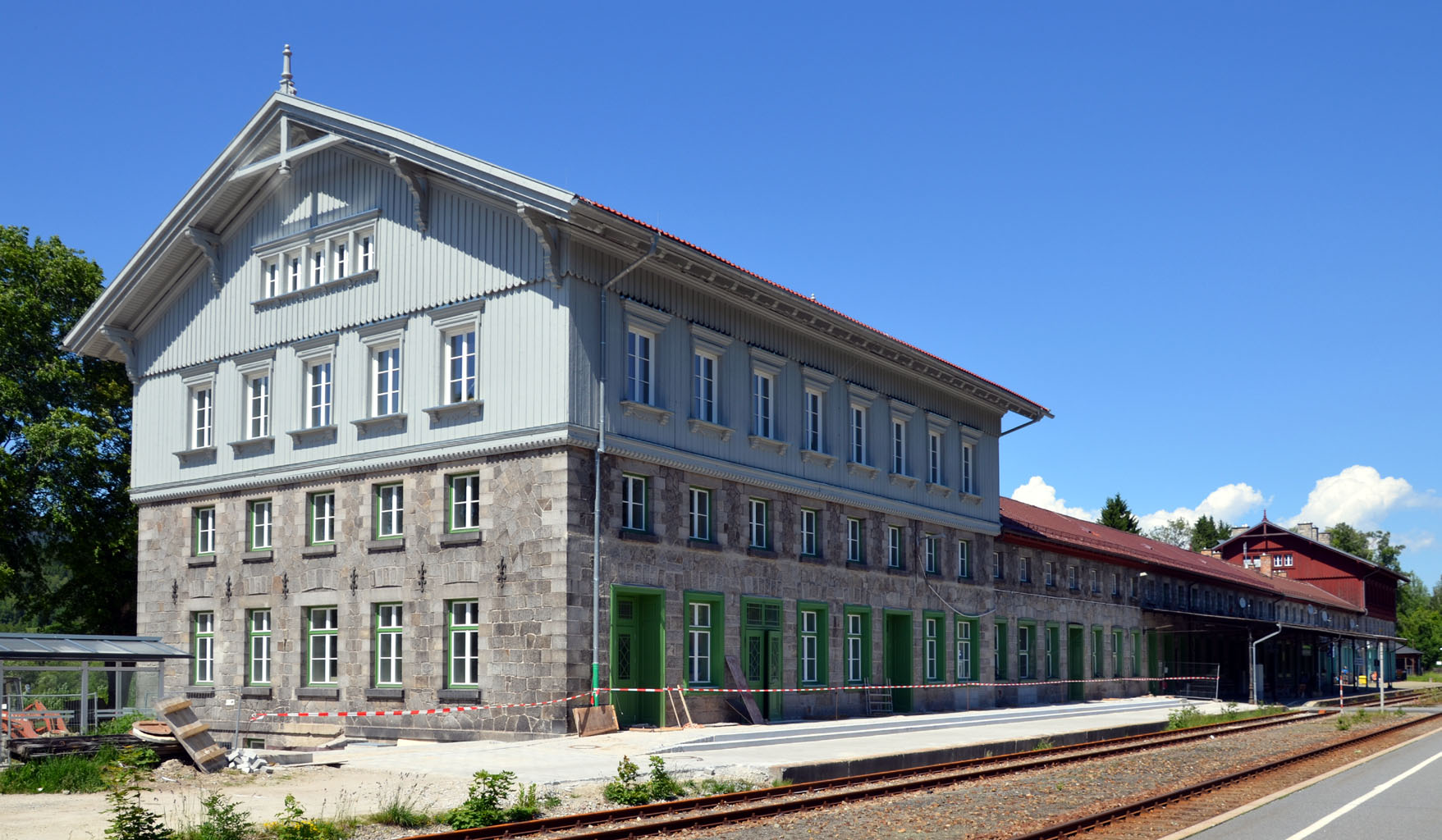
- Train station

- Coat of arms

- Location of Bayerisch Eisenstein within Regen district
- Interactive map of Bayerisch Eisenstein
- Location within Germany Location within Bavaria
- Coordinates: 49°7′12″N 13°12′00″E
- Country: Germany
- State: Bavaria
- Admin. region: Niederbayern
- District: Regen
- Subdivisions: 8 districts

Government
  - Mayor (2020–26): Michael Herzog (CSU)

Area
  - Total: 47.34 km^{2} (18.28 sq mi)
- Elevation: 724 m (2,375 ft)

Population (2025-12-31)
  - Total: 925
  - Density: 19.5/km^{2} (50.6/sq mi)
- Time zone: UTC+01:00 (CET)
  - Summer (DST): UTC+02:00 (CEST)
- Postal codes: 94252
- Dialling codes: 09925
- Vehicle registration: REG
- Website: www.bayerisch-eisenstein.de

Bayerisch Eisenstein, until 1951 just Eisenstein (Czech: Bavorská Železná Ruda) is a village and a municipality in the Regen district, in Bavaria, Germany.

== Geography ==
Bayerisch Eisenstein is located within the Bayerischer Wald, and borders the Bavarian Forest National Park (Germany's first national park, established in 1970). The town is both a winter and a summer resort. In the summer, walking in the forest and mountains is popular. In winter, winter sports prevail, concentrated around the Großer Arber mountain.

It is one of a trio of connected places in the area. The other two are Železná Ruda and Špičák (part of Železná Ruda), both in the Czech Republic. Železná Ruda lies 2 kilometres northeast from Bayerisch Eisenstein. The town's railway station is split by the border.

== Transport ==
Today, trains run to both halves of the station from the respective countries. The local German train service, the Waldbahn, also continues across the border to Špičák in the Czech Republic.

Bayerisch Eisenstein lies on the Bavarian Forest railway from Plattling to Plzeň.

== Twin towns – sister cities ==
In 2006, Bayerisch Eisenstein and Železná Ruda signed a twinning agreement.
