= Hennenkobel =

Mountain in Germany

Coordinates: 49°03′N 13°11′E

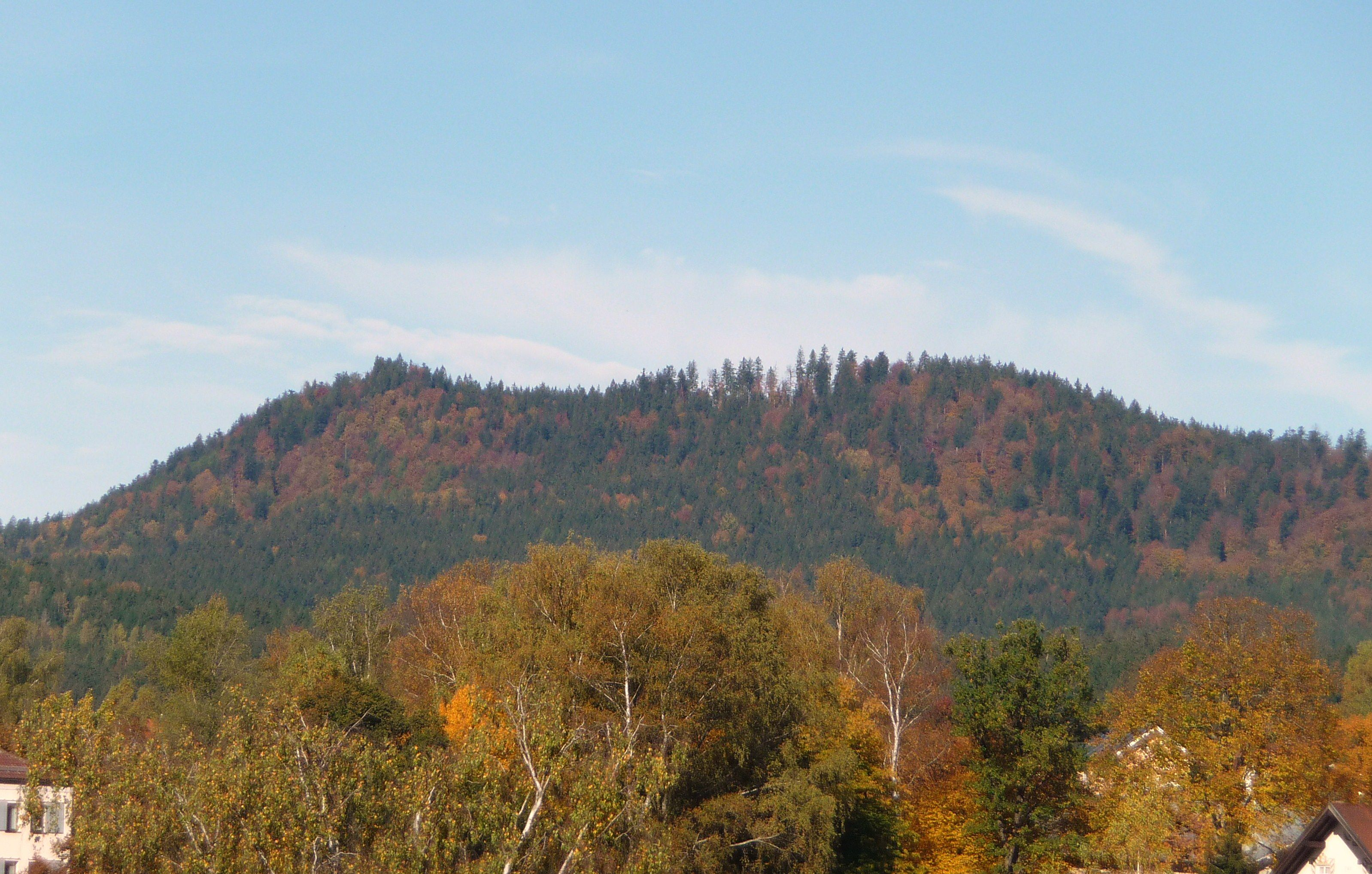
- View of Hennenkobel from Zwiesel

Highest point
- Elevation: 965 m (3,166 ft)

Geography
- Location: Bavaria, Germany

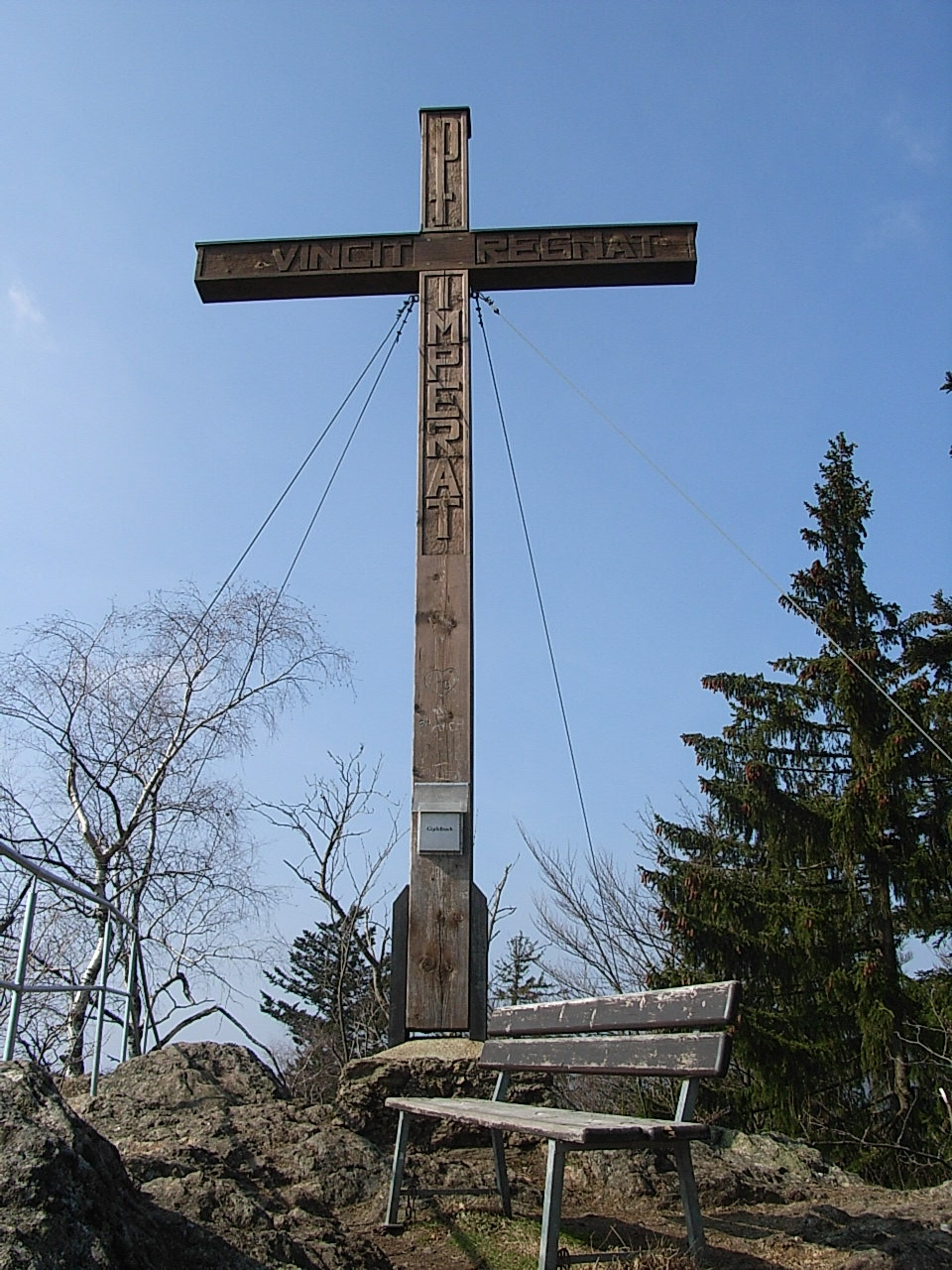
The Hennenkobel's summit

Hennenkobel is a mountain near Zwiesel, in Bavaria, Germany.
