= Glaskönigin =

The Zwiesel Glass Queen (German: Zwieseler Glaskönigin) or simply Glass Queen (Glaskönigin) is the representative of the internationally known glass industry and glass manufacturing tradition of the Bavarian Forest in Germany and of Zwiesel, the town where the glass handwork industry is concentrated. She is elected every two years and is introduced to the public during the Border Festival. She is supported by the Glass Princess who is elected at the same time.

== Tasks ==
The Glass Queen's role is to promote Zwiesel which is internationally recognised for its glassmaking and has been described as "famous for its crystal glass production". The Glass Queen leads presentation days for the industry and represents it at many events; in 2015 the Glass Queen spoke at the European Parliament in Brussels and also travelled around Germany including a visit to the north to Zwiesel's twin town of Brake. During her regency the Glass Queen represents the industry to key politicians like Horst Seehofer, Minister-President of Bavaria at events such as the annual New Year's reception. The Glass Queen is assisted in her tasks by the Glass Princess (Glasprinzess).

== Former Glass Queens and Glass Princesses ==
The following women have represented the Zwiesel glass industry as Glass Queens and Glass Princesses (in brackets) since elections began in 2003:

- 2023–2025: Susanne Glanzner (Jennifer Lo Conte)
- 2019–2023: Veronika Schwarz (Michaela Maier)
- 2017–2019: Julia Sattler (Kristina Bernereiter)
- 2015–2017: Andrea Herzog (Riccarda Kroner)
- 2013–2015: Julia Wagenbauer (Verena Probst)
- 2011–2013: Anja Weiß (Miriam Schneck)
- 2009–2011: Kathrin Czysch (Elena Brem)
- 2007–2009: Kristina Harant
- 2005–2007: Ramona Wenzl
- 2003–2005: Simone Molz
