= Nicki (singer) =

German singer and composer

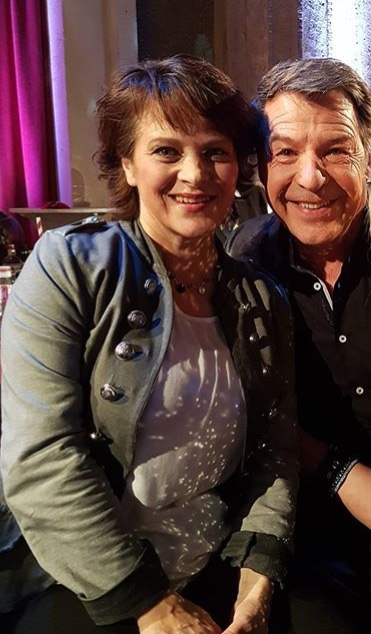

Background information
- Origin: Plattling, Deggendorf, Bavaria, Germany
- Genres: Pop, Europop, Rock
- Years active: 1980s–2006
- Label: Virgin
- Website: nicki.de

Nicki (born Doris Andrea Hrda; November 2, 1966 in the town of Plattling (in the Deggendorf district of Bavaria, Germany) is a German pop singer and composer. She currently lives with her life partner and their two daughters in Plattling.

== Career ==
Hrda grew up with three brothers and two sisters in Plattling. In 1982, she was at a talent competition when producer/songwriter Gog Seidl discovered her and signed her to a record contract. Her stage name of "Nicki" was thought up by pop star Sandra (of Enigma fame).

In 1983, she released her first single, Servus, mach's gut, a hit in the Bavarian dialect. Shortly after, in 1984, she released her first full-length album, Servus Nicki. Throughout her singing career, Nicki remained loyal to the Bavarian dialect. She had numerous other titles with great success, including So a Wunder, Wegen Dir, Mei Schönster Traum, I Bin a Bayerisches Cowgirl, Samstag Nacht, Doch die Zeit Bleibt Steh'n, and Du Bist in Meiner Macht.

The musical range of the 4'11" singer includes styles like rock, calypso, Motown – Soul, Synthpop and even country music. Nicki's biggest hits were composed by Harald Steinhauer, with lyrics by Helmut Frey.

In 1999, Nicki committed herself as a patron for the German Childhood Cancer Foundation. In more recent years, Nicki has withdrawn from the entertainment business to focus on her family life. However, in September 2006 she made a comeback with a new album, I gib wieder Gas, but it was not to last. In December, she announced that she would be retiring again, this time citing health reasons. All PR events and 2007 tour schedules were canceled.

== Discography ==
=== Albums ===
Year	Title	Comments
1985	Servus, Nicki	
1985	Weihnachten mit Nicki	
1986	Ganz oder gar net	
1987	Kleine Wunder	
1988	Radio Bavaria	
1989	Mein Hitalbum	Compilation
1990	Immer mehr	
1992	Grenzenlos	
1993	Ihre Hits	Compilation
1993	Tausend Fragen	
1995	Ois easy – 10 neue Country Songs	
1995	Golden Stars	Compilation
1996	Herzsprünge	
1998	Mein Hitalbum II	Compilation
1999	Zurück zu mir	
2004	The Essential	Compilation
2006	I gib wieder Gas	
2007	Schlager & Stars	Compilation
2007	I bin a bayrisches Cowgirl	Compilation (Unofficial album)
2009	Passt Scho!	
2011	So Wie I	
2018	Herzhoamat	

=== Singles ===
Year	Title	Album
1983	Servus, mach's guat	Servus, Nicki
1984	So a Wunder	Servus, Nicki
1984	Weil i immer no an Engerl glaub	Servus, Nicki
1985	Warum schaust du mi ned o	Servus, Nicki
1985	I wär am liabsten mit Dir ganz alloa	Servus, Nicki
1985	Mei schönster Traum	Weihnachten mit Nicki
1986	Wenn i mit Dir tanz	Ganz oder gar net
1986	Wegen Dir	Ganz oder gar net
1986	Wenn d'Sehnsucht brennt	Ganz oder gar net
1987	Mehr von dir	Kleine Wunder
1987	Mit dir des wär mei Leben	Kleine Wunder
1987	Einsam ohne di	Kleine Wunder
1987	I bin a bayrisches Cowgirl	Kleine Wunder
1988	Samstag Nacht	Radio Bavaria
1988	Koana war so wie du	Radio Bavaria
1988	Vasolidor	Radio Bavaria
1989	Hit-Medley	
1990	Wie a Traum	Immer mehr
1990	Wenn du bei mir bist	Immer mehr
1990	Doch die Zeit bleibt stehn	Immer mehr
1991	Hals über Kopf	Immer mehr
1992	Du bist in meiner Macht	Grenzenlos
1992	Des geht vorbei	Grenzenlos
1992	Grenzenlos	Grenzenlos
1993	Was wärst du ohne mi	Tausend Fragen
1993	Hey net so schnell	Tausend Fragen
1993	Tausend Fragen	Tausend Fragen
1995	Immer nur bei dir	Ois easy
1995	Des was i brauch	Ois easy
1996	Schau mi net so an	Herzsprünge
1996	Goodbye Jane	Herzsprünge
1999	Ich kann's nicht lassen	Zurück zu mir
1999	Du brichst mein Herz entzwei	Zurück zu mir
2000	Soviel mehr	Zurück zu mir
