= Zwiesel =

- Town
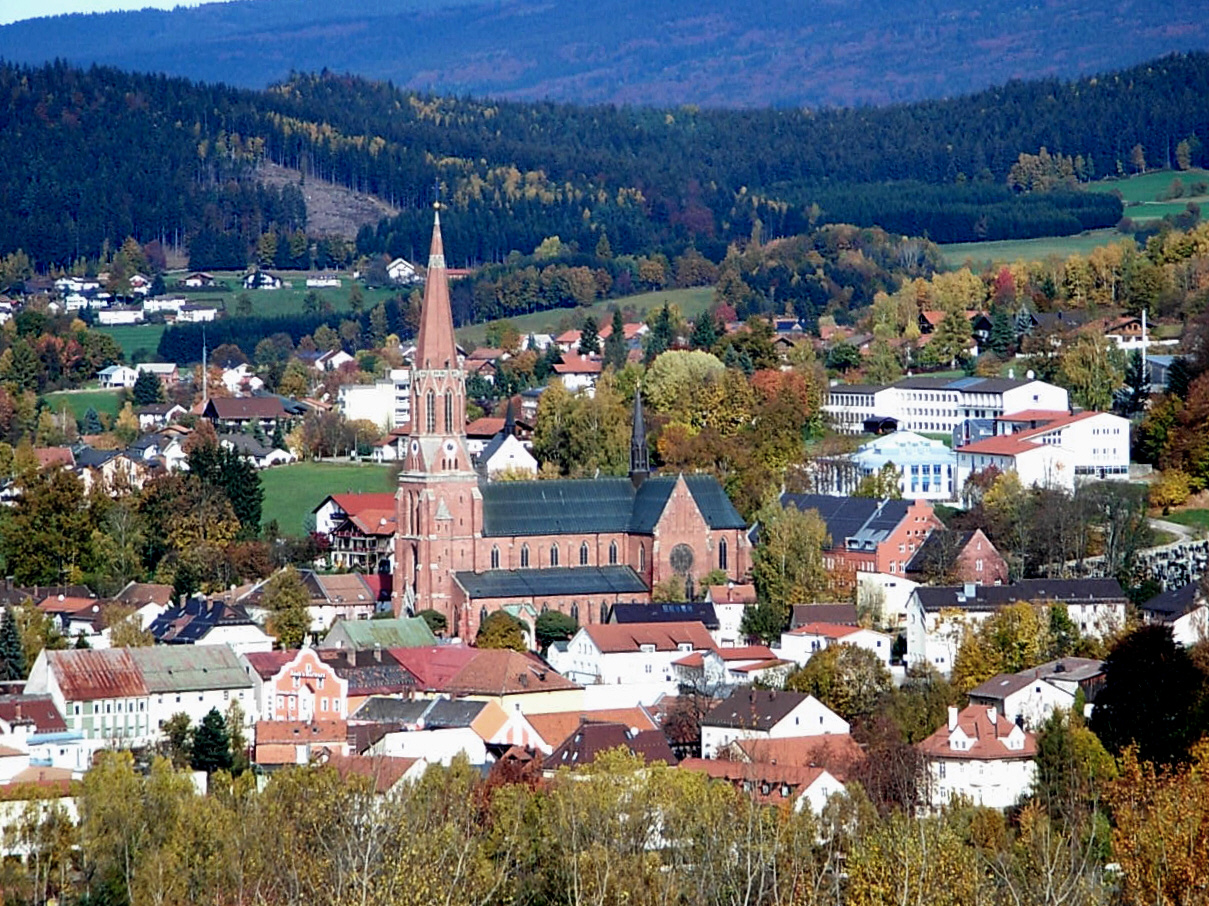
- The town with the Church of Saint Nicholas

- Coat of arms

- Location of Zwiesel within Regen district
- Interactive map of Zwiesel
- Location within Germany Location within Bavaria
- Coordinates: 49°01′N 13°14′E
- Country: Germany
- State: Bavaria
- Admin. region: Niederbayern
- District: Regen
- Subdivisions: 8 districts

Government
  - Mayor (2022–28): Karl-Heinz Eppinger (SPD)

Area
  - Total: 41.16 km^{2} (15.89 sq mi)
- Elevation: 580–750 m (1,900–2,460 ft)

Population (2025-12-31)
  - Total: 9,078
  - Density: 220.6/km^{2} (571.2/sq mi)
- Time zone: UTC+01:00 (CET)
  - Summer (DST): UTC+02:00 (CEST)
- Postal codes: 94227
- Dialling codes: 09922
- Vehicle registration: REG
- Website: www.zwiesel.de

Zwiesel (German pronunciation: [ˈtsviːzl̩]) is a town in the lower-Bavarian district of Regen, Germany, and since 1972 is a Luftkurort with particularly good air. The name of the town was derived from the Bavarian word stem zwisl which refers to the form of a fork. The fork of the rivers Großer Regen and Kleiner Regen and the land that lies between these two rivers were called Zwiesel.

== Geography ==
The town of Zwiesel is situated in an extensive valley basin at the foot of the mountain range formed by the peaks of the Großer Arber (1,456 m), Großer Falkenstein (1,315 m) and Kiesruck (1,265 m), exactly at the spot where the two rivers, the Großer Regen and the Kleiner Regen join and form the Black Regen. It is located 10 km (6.2 mi) to the north-east of the district town of Regen, 35 km (22 mi) from the town of Deggendorf, 30 km (19 mi) from the town of Grafenau and 15 km (9.3 mi) from the border crossing point at Bayerisch Eisenstein, entry point to the Czech Republic. In addition to be accessed by the federal road B11, the town of Zwiesel has a main railway station run by the Bavarian Forest Railway, where trains depart for Plattling, Bayerisch Eisenstein or Bodenmais at hourly intervals, and for Grafenau at two-hour intervals.

=== Division of the town ===
Zwiesel consists of 11 districts:

- Ableg
- Bärnzell
- Glasberg
- Griesbach
- Innenried
- Klautzenbach
- Lichtenthal
- Rabenstein
- Theresienthal
- Zwiesel
- Zwieselberg

=== Mineralogy ===
In the area of Zwiesel a great diversity of mineralogical compositions can be found; glass manufacturing companies in particular benefited from the outstanding amount of quartz. The most famous mining site is probably the quartz quarry at Hennenkobel mountain (the name translates as 'chicken coop') where many rare and popular minerals were found. The mineral Zwieselite, which can be found there, was named after the glass town of Zwiesel.

=== Climate ===
Zwiesel has an humid continental climate (Köppen: Dfb; Trewartha: Dclo). The Zwiesel weather station is located at an altitude of 615 m (2,018 ft). The temperature is significantly lower than in most parts of Germany by several degrees. At the same time, the average annual precipitation exceeds 1,000 mm (39 in), which is relatively rare in Germany.

The Zwiesel weather station has recorded the following extreme values:

- Its highest temperature was 36.2 °C (97.2 °F) on 21 July 1998.
- Its lowest temperature was −24.8 °C (−12.6 °F) on 24 December 2001.
- Its greatest annual precipitation was 1,304.5 mm (51.36 in) in 2023.
- Its least annual precipitation was 804.4 mm (31.67 in) in 2015.
- The longest annual sunshine was 2,045.9 hours in 2018.
- The shortest annual sunshine was 1,446.2 hours in 2013.

Climate data for Zwiesel: 615m (1991−2020 normals, extremes 1998–present)
Month	Jan	Feb	Mar	Apr	May	Jun	Jul	Aug	Sep	Oct	Nov	Dec	Year
Record high °C (°F)	17.5 (63.5)	17.8 (64.0)	22.4 (72.3)	29.6 (85.3)	31.5 (88.7)	34.3 (93.7)	36.2 (97.2)	34.2 (93.6)	31.7 (89.1)	26.8 (80.2)	22.1 (71.8)	14.7 (58.5)	36.2 (97.2)
Mean maximum °C (°F)	9.1 (48.4)	11.8 (53.2)	17.5 (63.5)	22.9 (73.2)	27.0 (80.6)	30.2 (86.4)	31.8 (89.2)	30.7 (87.3)	26.4 (79.5)	22.2 (72.0)	16.3 (61.3)	9.7 (49.5)	32.9 (91.2)
Mean daily maximum °C (°F)	1.8 (35.2)	3.7 (38.7)	8.2 (46.8)	14.2 (57.6)	18.0 (64.4)	21.8 (71.2)	23.6 (74.5)	23.2 (73.8)	18.4 (65.1)	13.2 (55.8)	7.5 (45.5)	2.7 (36.9)	13.1 (55.6)
Daily mean °C (°F)	−2.1 (28.2)	−0.5 (31.1)	2.7 (36.9)	8.0 (46.4)	12.2 (54.0)	15.7 (60.3)	17.4 (63.3)	16.7 (62.1)	12.2 (54.0)	7.8 (46.0)	2.8 (37.0)	−0.9 (30.4)	7.9 (46.2)
Mean daily minimum °C (°F)	−5.5 (22.1)	−5.1 (22.8)	−2.1 (28.2)	1.4 (34.5)	5.9 (42.6)	9.7 (49.5)	11.1 (52.0)	10.5 (50.9)	6.8 (44.2)	2.7 (36.9)	−0.9 (30.4)	−3.7 (25.3)	2.8 (37.0)
Mean minimum °C (°F)	−16.5 (2.3)	−13.3 (8.1)	−9.1 (15.6)	−4.7 (23.5)	−0.4 (31.3)	3.2 (37.8)	5.2 (41.4)	4.5 (40.1)	0.5 (32.9)	−3.5 (25.7)	−7.6 (18.3)	−13.8 (7.2)	−18.5 (−1.3)
Record low °C (°F)	−24.2 (−11.6)	−22.3 (−8.1)	−21.7 (−7.1)	−8.6 (16.5)	−3.7 (25.3)	0.4 (32.7)	3.4 (38.1)	1.5 (34.7)	−2.8 (27.0)	−8.4 (16.9)	−15.4 (4.3)	−24.8 (−12.6)	−24.8 (−12.6)
Average precipitation mm (inches)	112.9 (4.44)	76.7 (3.02)	84.6 (3.33)	44.6 (1.76)	89.3 (3.52)	101.2 (3.98)	93.4 (3.68)	107.2 (4.22)	75.7 (2.98)	72.1 (2.84)	83.5 (3.29)	105.1 (4.14)	1,046.3 (41.19)
Average extreme snow depth cm (inches)	35.1 (13.8)	39.9 (15.7)	20.3 (8.0)	3.0 (1.2)	0 (0)	0 (0)	0 (0)	0 (0)	0 (0)	1.0 (0.4)	5.7 (2.2)	19.7 (7.8)	47.9 (18.9)
Average precipitation days (≥ 0.1 mm)	18.3	14.7	15.7	11.6	16.5	15.9	16.2	15.1	13.5	13.9	14.7	18.6	184.7
Average relative humidity (%)	89.1	83.3	78.3	71.6	73.9	74.8	75.3	77.6	82.3	86.0	90.3	91.1	81.1
Mean monthly sunshine hours	62.2	91.5	143.6	185.8	195.8	204.2	220.8	213.9	164.8	117.9	80.8	58.2	1,780.7
Source 1: NOAA
Source 2: Deutscher Wetterdienst / SKlima.de

== History ==
According to the legend, the first settlers were gold diggers. It was in 1255 that Zwiesel was first mentioned as a village with a wooden chapel. In 1280 the area was an important trading centre for goods to and from Bohemia. From 1313 on, Zwiesel was designated as a market municipality. On 11 September 1560, the municipality of Zwiesel was granted the coat of arms by the Duke of Bavaria, Albert V, which is valid still today. Philipp Apian indicated the place on his map of 1568 calling it "Zwisel".

The development of Zwiesel was frequently hampered by wars and epidemic plagues. I.e. the area was destroyed in 1431 by the Hussites, in 1468 during the Böckler War and in 1633 by the Swedish Army during the Thirty Years' War. In 1741 it was invaded by the Pandurs and in 1809 there was a great battle at the Landwehrbergl against a horde of Bohemian plunderers.

It was as early as in the 16th century that mining started in Zwiesel at the Rotkot Mine. In 1767 another church was built, known as Bergkirche, and in 1838 the present town hall was constructed. Serious fires raged in the municipality in 1825, 1832, 1846, 1849 and 1870. With the latter fire, on 19 August 1876, the parish church burst into flames too. Water pipes were laid in 1888, electricity was available from 1896. Between 1891 and 1896 the main Parish Church of Saint Nicholas was built. In 1904 Zwiesel was raised to the status of a town and quickly became the economic and cultural centre of the middle part of the Bavarian Forest.

From the very beginning development was driven by glass and timber. The regional glass industry around Zwiesel dates back to the 15th century (the glass hut of Rabenstein was founded in 1421). In 1836 the glass factory of Theresienthal was founded and in 1872 the master glass maker, Anton Müller, started to build the glass works Annathal, which later became the Schott-Werke. Today this factory operates under the name of Zwiesel Kristallglas and is an important producer of goblets in Germany. In 1904 the technical school for glass manufacturing and decorating professions was founded, which continuously developed into a national training centre for glass-related professions.

Near the end of World War II, at noon on 20 April 1945, several houses were destroyed in a bombing raid on the railroad bridges, killing 15 civilians. On 22 April 1945 Zwiesel was handed over to the American Army without any further bloodshed.

An event in recent town history was the Bavarian State Exhibition "Bavaria – Bohemia: 1500 Years of Neighborliness". Many visitors to the exhibition also came from the neighbouring Czech Republic.

=== Etymology ===
The name of the town was mentioned in 1254 as "Zwisel", soon after in 1301 as "Zwiseln", in 1738 as "Zwisl" and in 1832 as "Zwiesel" or "Zwisel". The Middle High German word zwisel means 'fork' and refers to the merging of the rivers Großer Regen and Kleiner Regen as well as to a junction of streets.

=== Incorporations ===
In the course of regional reforms the community of Klautzenbach was incorporated on 1 October 1971. On 1 January 1978 the larger part of the community of Rabenstein was added as well. The community of Bärnzell spanning over 1,250 hectares (3,100 acres) with 652 inhabitants, was incorporated on 1 May 1978.

=== Religions ===
As early as 1356, the area had its own pastoral worker who was subordinate to the vicar of Regen. In 1558 the church district, lacking its own administration, was raised to the status of parish. The Augustinian monastery Maria Trost (Order of Saint Augustine), founded by Sudeten German monks and belonging to the Vicariate of Vienna, has been located here since 1962.

After the 1803 Bavarian Edict of Religion by Prince-Elector Maximilian, Protestant Christians started settling in Zwiesel. In 1885, the Evangelical Association of Zwiesel was founded, which succeeded in making Zwiesel the seat of a traveling preacher's office in 1889. On May 29, 1895, the neo-Gothic church in Bahnhofstraße (today Dr.-Schott-Straße) was consecrated. It was elevated to the status of a parish in 1922.

A New Apostolic Church with its own church building was also established in Zwiesel.

=== Demographic development ===
In the year of 1800 Zwiesel had 803 inhabitants living in 140 houses. The town reached 1000 inhabitants as early as 1810. In 1867 the market municipality of Zwiesel had 2,303 inhabitants living in 243 houses. By 1900 the number of inhabitants had increased to 3,760 with 333 houses. After World War II the number increased to 5,885 inhabitants. The population peaked in 1984 with 10,670 residents. Currently 9,257 people live in the town of Zwiesel and its surrounding neighbourhoods.

== Politics ==
=== Town council ===
Since the local election of 15 March 2020, the town council of Zwiesel is formed as follows:

- Christian Social Union in Bavaria (CSU): 7 seats
- Free Voters of Bavaria (FW): 4 seats
- SPD Bavaria: 3 seats
- Alliance 90/The Greens: 3 seats
- Nonpartisan Voters' Association: 3 seats

=== Mayor ===
The mayor is Karl-Heinz Eppinger (SPD), elected in December 2022. He succeeded Franz Xaver Steininger, who had been in office since 2011.

=== Twin towns ===
Since May 2006 Zwiesel has been twinned with the port town of Brake, Lower Saxony, at the river Weser. Brake is approximately 800 km (500 mi) from Zwiesel.

== Economy ==
Glassmaking, brewing, and tourism are the most important industries in the town. Every two years the Glass Queen is elected to represent the glassmaking industry of the region.

== Notable people ==
- Dragan Holcer (1945–2015), Yugoslavian footballer
- Franz Bernreiter (born 1954), biathlete, Olympic medalist
- Klaus Gattermann (born 1961), ski racer
- Susanne Kiermayer (born 1968), sport shooter, Olympic medalist
- Lutz Pfannenstiel (born 1973), footballer
- Tessa Ganserer (born 1977), politician
- Josef Wenzl (born 1984), cross-country skier
- Lukas Mühl (born 1997), footballer

=== Associated with the town ===
- Walter Demel (born 1935), cross-country skier
- Klaus Fischer (born 1949), national footballer
- Heinz Wittmann (born 1943), footballer (started his career at SC Zwiesel)

== Gallery ==
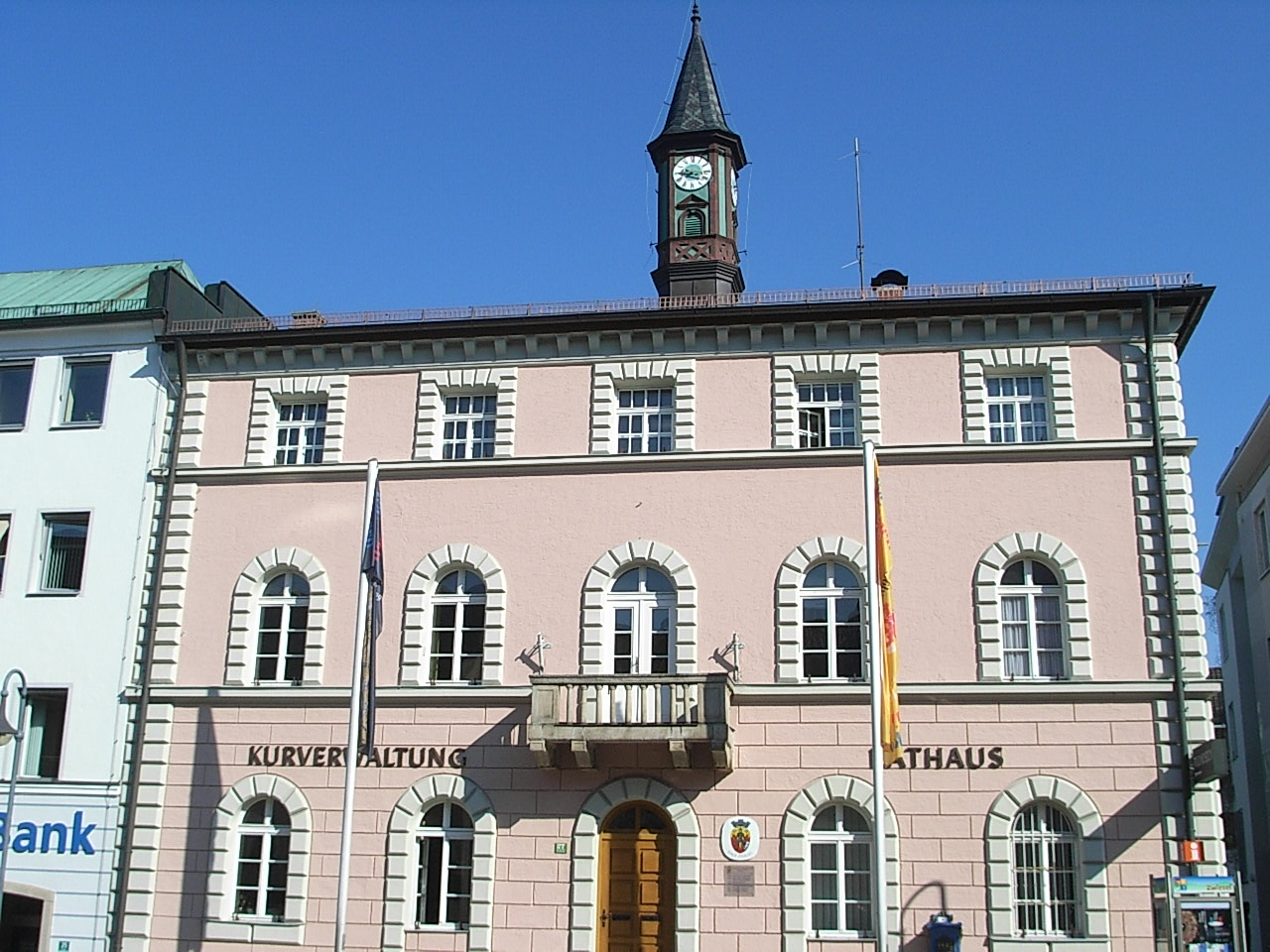
Town hall

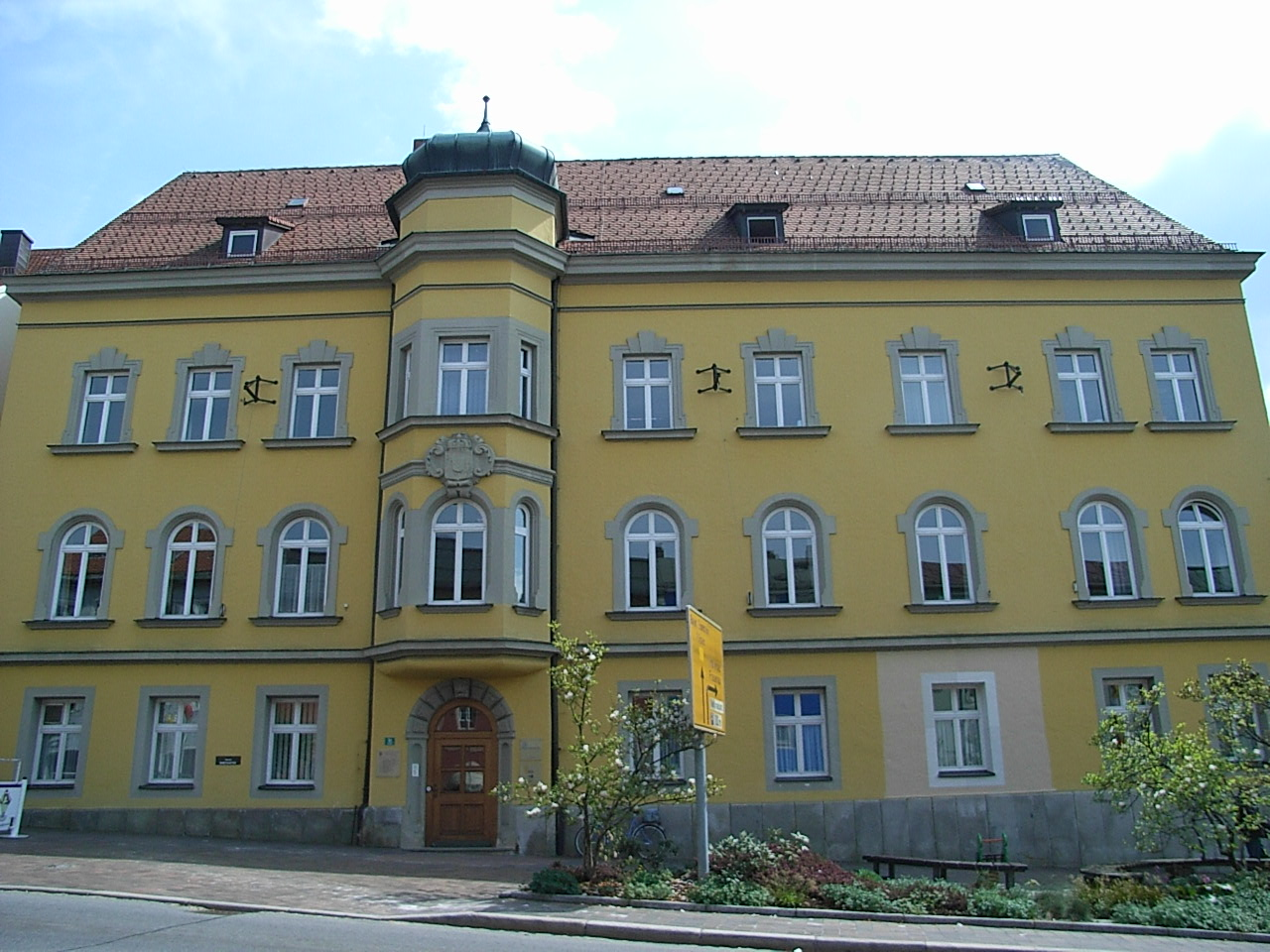
Former district court

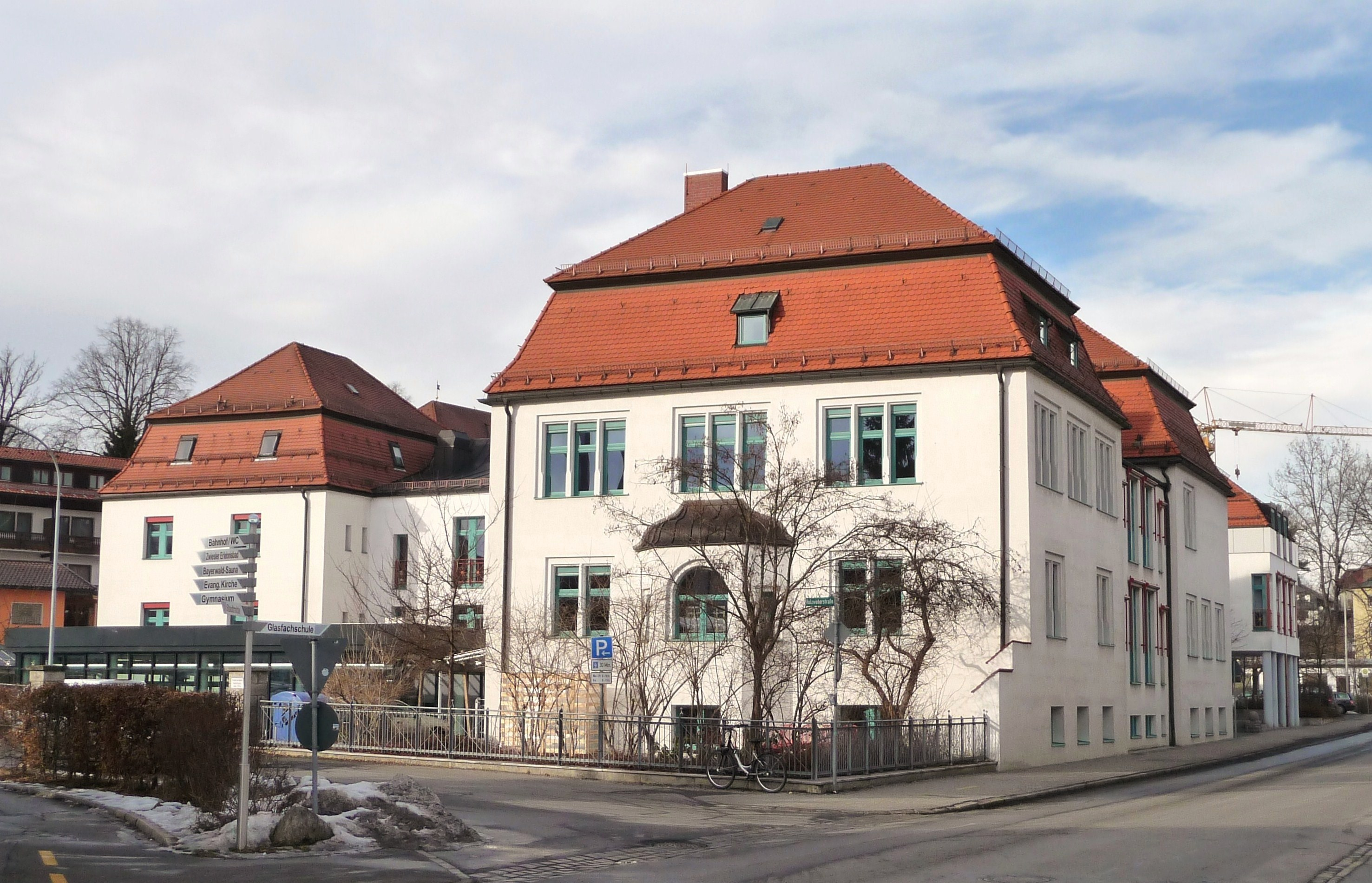
School for glassmakers

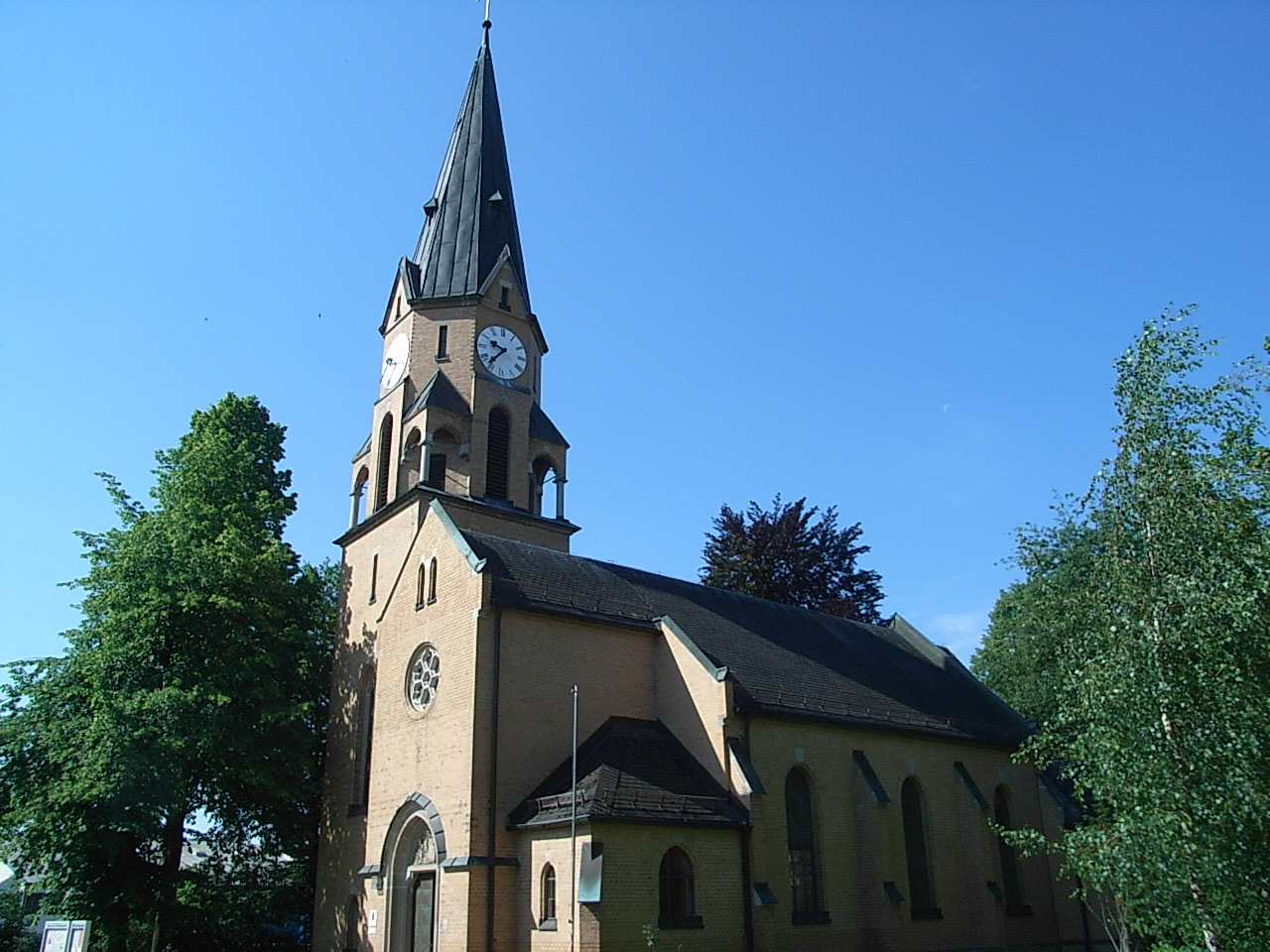
Evangelical church
