= Železná Ruda =

- Town
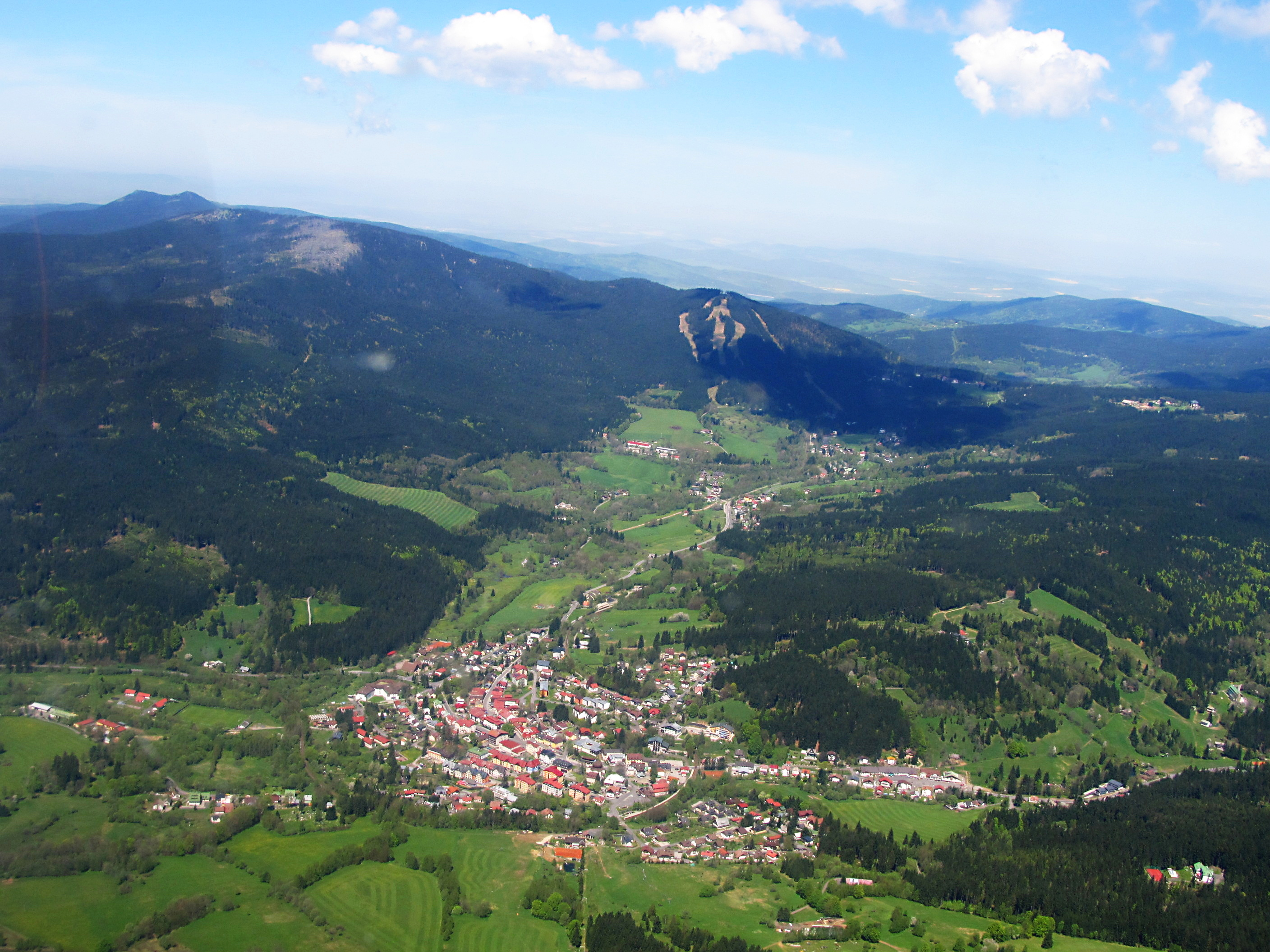
- Aerial view

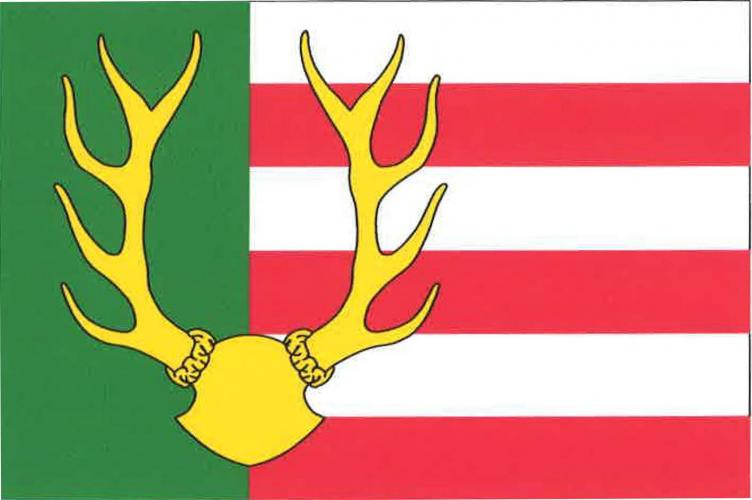
- Flag Coat of arms

- Location in the Czech Republic
- Coordinates: 49°8′28″N 13°13′48″E
- Country: Czech Republic
- Region: Plzeň
- District: Klatovy
- First mentioned: 1569

Government
  - Mayor: Filip Smola

Area
  - Total: 79.76 km^{2} (30.80 sq mi)
- Elevation: 771 m (2,530 ft)

Population (2026-01-01)
  - Total: 1,580
  - Density: 19.8/km^{2} (51.3/sq mi)
- Time zone: UTC+1 (CET)
  - Summer (DST): UTC+2 (CEST)
- Postal code: 340 04
- Website: www.zelezna-ruda.cz

Železná Ruda (Czech pronunciation: [ˈʒɛlɛznaː ˈruda]; German: Markt Eisenstein) is a town in Klatovy District in the Plzeň Region of the Czech Republic. It has about 1,600 inhabitants. The town is located in the Bohemian Forest mountain range, on the border with Germany.

Železná Ruda was founded at the beginning of the 16th century as a mining town. Today it is one of the important sports and tourist centres of the Bohemian Forest.

== Administrative division ==
Železná Ruda consists of five municipal parts (in brackets population according to the 2021 census):

- Železná Ruda (1,133)
- Alžbětín (76)
- Debrník (17)
- Hojsova Stráž (137)
- Pancíř (8)
- Špičák (261)

== Etymology ==
The Czech name Železná Ruda and the historic German name Eisenstein mean 'iron ore'. They refer to rich deposits of iron ore that were found and mined here.

== Geography ==
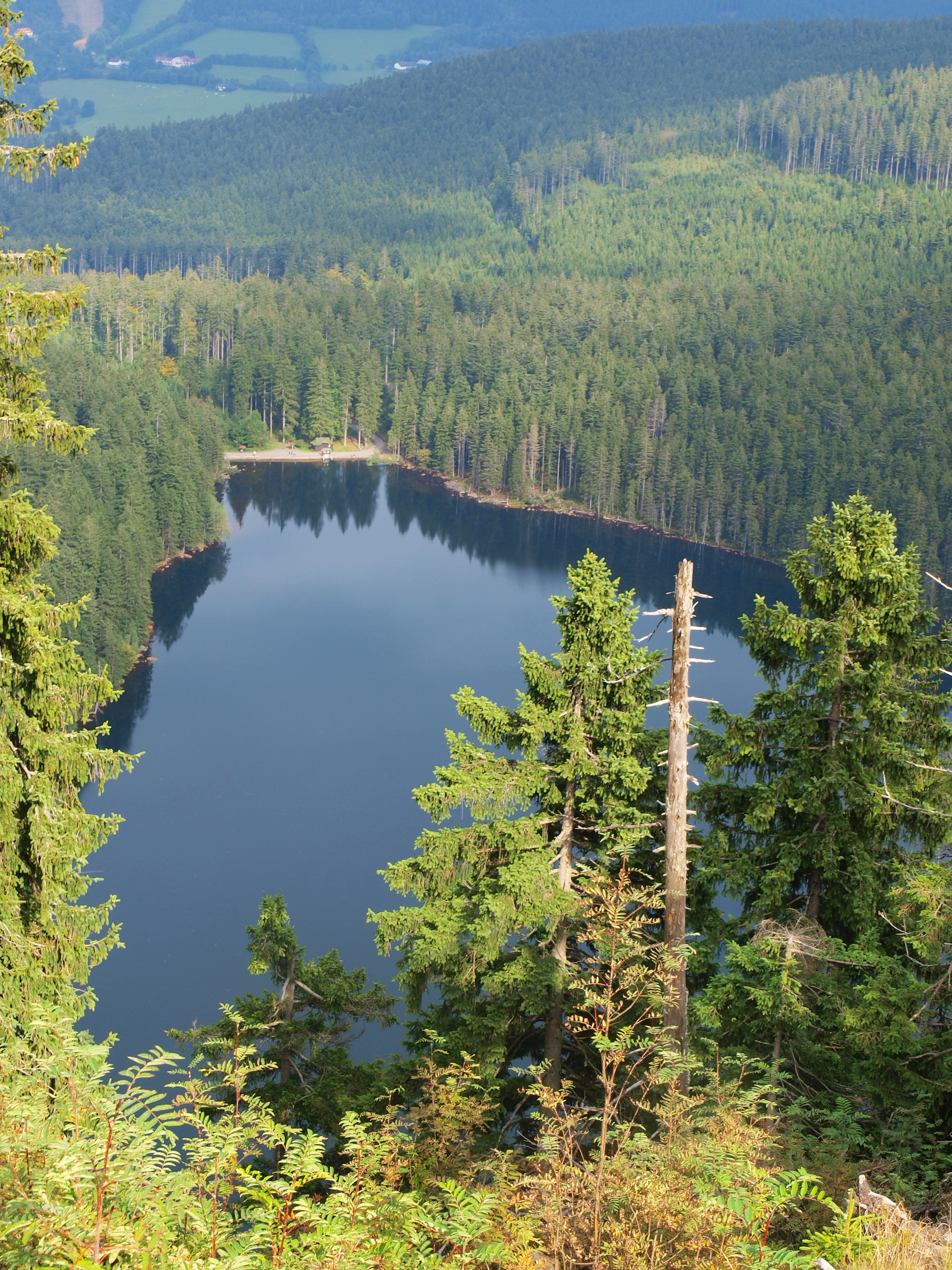
Lake Černé jezero

Železná Ruda is located about 29 kilometres (18 mi) south of Klatovy and 66 km (41 mi) south of Plzeň, on the border with Germany. It lies in a wild mountainous terrain of the Bohemian Forest. The town is surrounded with thick coniferous woods. The highest mountain in the municipal territory is Jezerní hora with an elevation of 1,344 m (4,409 ft). The southeastern part of the territory lies in the Šumava National Park, rest of the territory belongs to the Šumava Protected Landscape Area.

The Regen River originates on the southern slopes of Pancíř mountain and flows through the town proper to the German border. The Úhlava River originates on the western slopes of the same mountain and flows across the northern half of the municipal territory.

Černé jezero, the largest natural lake in the Czech Republic and Čertovo jezero, the third largest lake, are located in the territory of Železná Ruda.

=== Climate ===
Climate data for Železná Ruda (1991–2021)
Month	Jan	Feb	Mar	Apr	May	Jun	Jul	Aug	Sep	Oct	Nov	Dec	Year
Mean daily maximum °C (°F)	−0.2 (31.6)	1.2 (34.2)	5.4 (41.7)	11.5 (52.7)	15.7 (60.3)	18.9 (66.0)	20.5 (68.9)	20.5 (68.9)	16.0 (60.8)	11.5 (52.7)	5.6 (42.1)	1.1 (34.0)	10.0 (50.0)
Daily mean °C (°F)	−3.1 (26.4)	−2.3 (27.9)	1.3 (34.3)	6.6 (43.9)	11.3 (52.3)	14.8 (58.6)	16.3 (61.3)	16.2 (61.2)	11.9 (53.4)	7.6 (45.7)	2.4 (36.3)	−1.6 (29.1)	6.8 (44.2)
Mean daily minimum °C (°F)	−6.0 (21.2)	−5.6 (21.9)	−2.7 (27.1)	1.6 (34.9)	6.5 (43.7)	10.1 (50.2)	11.8 (53.2)	11.8 (53.2)	8.0 (46.4)	4.2 (39.6)	−0.2 (31.6)	−4.1 (24.6)	1.4 (34.5)
Average precipitation mm (inches)	74 (2.9)	60 (2.4)	76 (3.0)	69 (2.7)	102 (4.0)	114 (4.5)	119 (4.7)	107 (4.2)	82 (3.2)	68 (2.7)	69 (2.7)	76 (3.0)	1,016 (40.0)
Source: Climate-Data.org

== History ==
Železná Ruda was founded at the beginning of the 16th century as a mining town. After around 150 years, the iron ore stocks were extracted and iron production ended. Because quartz and limestone deposits were also located here, the town's industry reoriented to the glass industry. The first factory was built in 1624. The Alžbětín Glassworks was later one of the largest glassworks in the Bohemian Forest. In the second half of the 19th century, it was known mainly for plate glass.

In 1874–1877, the railway was built.

The town's German population was expelled after 1945.

== Demographics ==
Historical population

Year	Pop.	±%
1869	3,465	—
1880	4,424	+27.7%
1890	4,492	+1.5%
1900	4,395	−2.2%
1910	4,349	−1.0%

Year	Pop.	±%
1921	4,639	+6.7%
1930	5,080	+9.5%
1950	2,715	−46.6%
1961	1,431	−47.3%
1970	1,363	−4.8%

Year	Pop.	±%
1980	1,215	−10.9%
1991	1,680	+38.3%
2001	2,017	+20.1%
2011	1,846	−8.5%
2021	1,632	−11.6%

Source: Censuses

== Economy ==
The local economy is very dependent on tourism because Železná Ruda is one of the most popular skiing centres of the Bohemian Forest, as well as a starting point for many hiking trips. The town has also gained a reputation as a hotspot for prostitution shortly after the Velvet Revolution.

== Transport ==
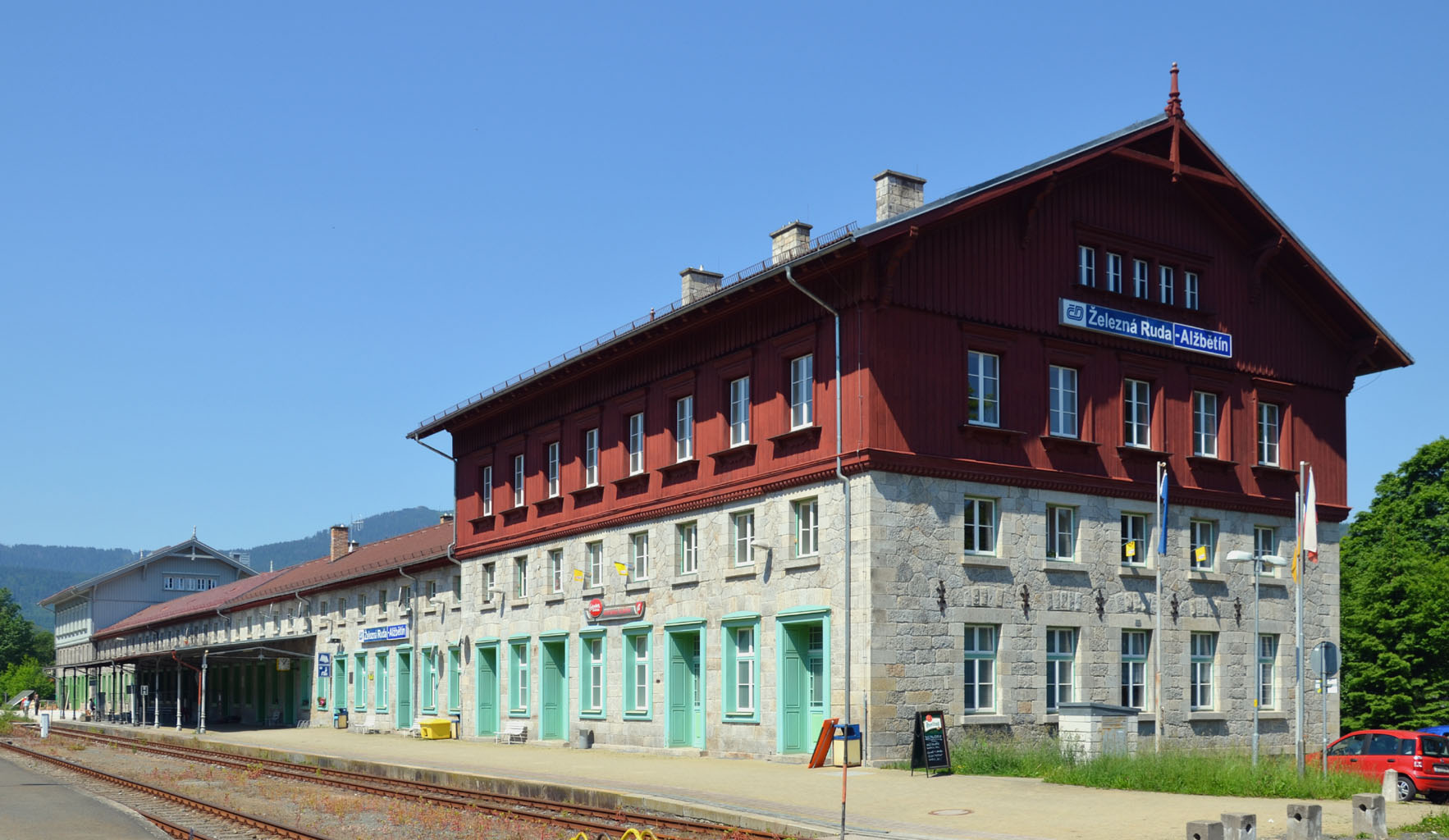
Železná Ruda-Alžbětín railway station

Železná Ruda is located on the railway line from Prague via Plzeň and Klatovy, which ends here. The territory is served by five train stations and stops: Železná Ruda centrum, Železná Ruda město, Železná Ruda-Alžbětín, Špičák and Hojsova Stráž-Brčálník. The station building of Železná Ruda-Alžbětín/Bayerisch Eisenstein is divided by the national border between the Czech Republic and Germany.

A railway tunnel goes under the Špičák mountain. The tunnel was built in 1874–1877 and is 1,747 m (5,732 ft) long. It was the longest railway tunnel in the Czech Republic until 2007 and since 2018 it has been the third longest railway tunnel in the country.

== Sights ==
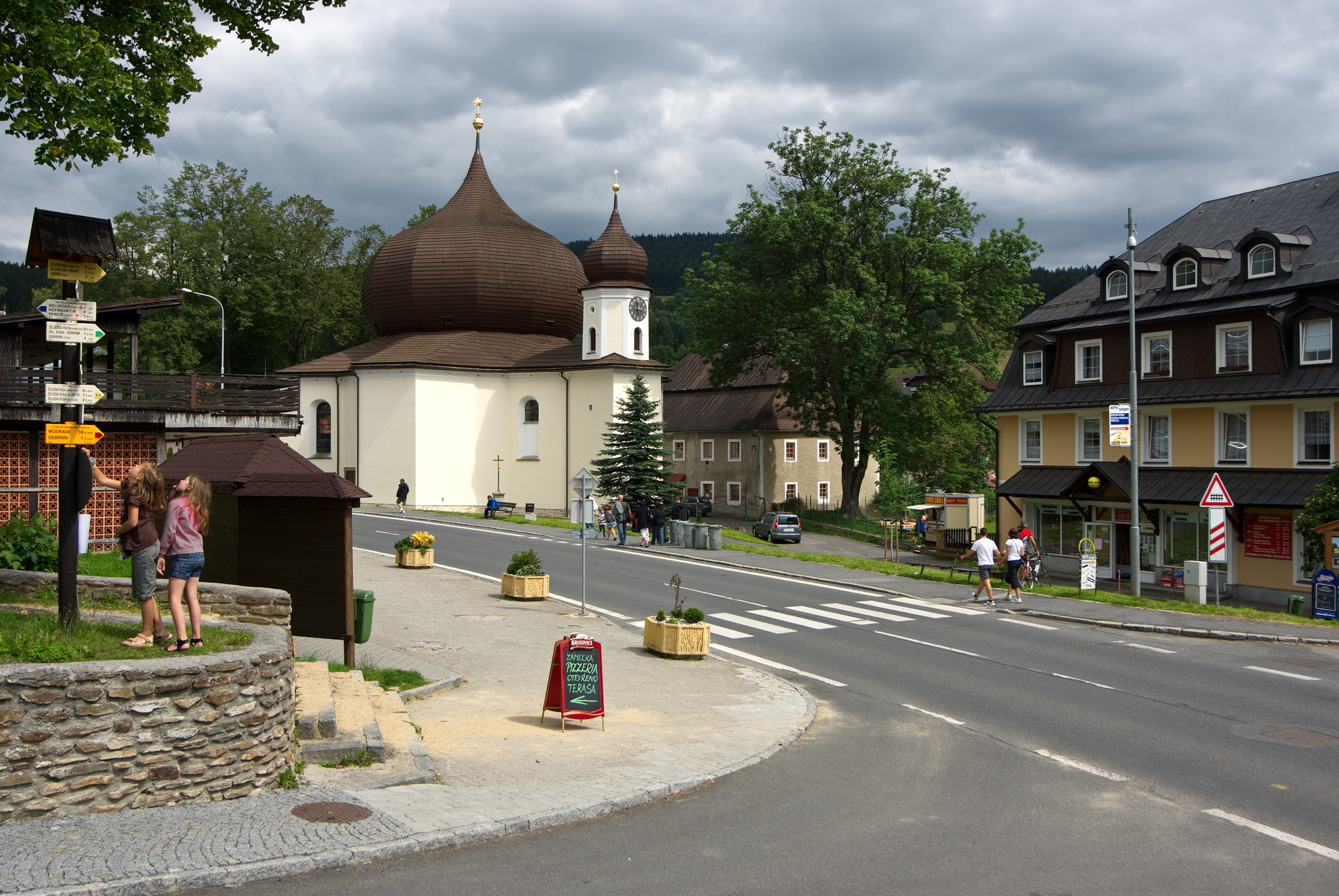
Town square with the Church of Our Lady of Perpetual Help of the Star

There are many nature sights, such as lakes Černé jezero and Čertovo jezero, and the Špičák mountain at 1,202 m (3,944 ft) above sea level.

The most valuable historical monument is the Church of Our Lady of Perpetual Help of the Star. It was built in the Baroque style in 1729–1732. Its peculiarity is the floor plan of the six-pointed star and two cupolas with a star. Other historical sights include the Chapel of Saints Anthony of Padua and Barbara, and the Stations of the Cross.

The local museum and information centre are located in a house from 1877, which was once the home of a well-known family of glassmakers. There is an exhibition of traditional glass, documents and photographs concerning history available all year round.

== Notable people ==
- Kristina Taberyová (1951–2023), theatre director and screenwriter

== Twin towns – sister cities ==
Železná Ruda is twinned with:

- Aldeno, Italy
- Bayerisch Eisenstein, Germany
- Zernez, Switzerland
