= Plattling =

- Town
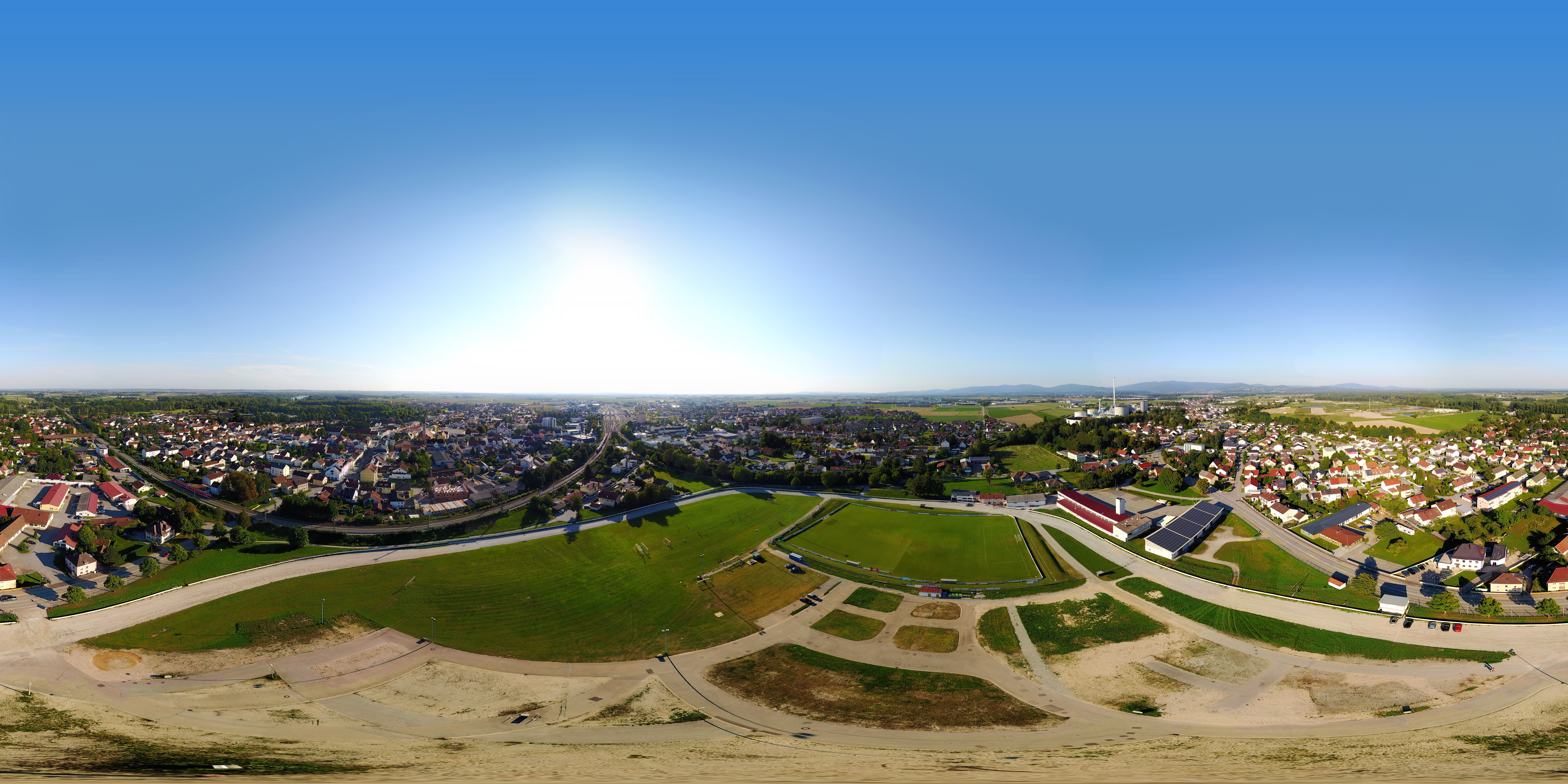
- Panorama of Plattling

- Coat of arms

- Location of Plattling within Deggendorf district
- Interactive map of Plattling
- Location within Germany Location within Bavaria
- Coordinates: 48°46′N 12°52′E
- Country: Germany
- State: Bavaria
- Admin. region: Niederbayern
- District: Deggendorf
- Subdivisions: 13 Ortsteile

Government
  - Mayor (2020–26): Hans Schmalhofer (CSU)

Area
  - Total: 35.9 km^{2} (13.9 sq mi)
- Elevation: 320 m (1,050 ft)

Population (2025-12-31)
  - Total: 13,296
  - Density: 370/km^{2} (959/sq mi)
- Time zone: UTC+01:00 (CET)
  - Summer (DST): UTC+02:00 (CEST)
- Postal codes: 94447
- Dialling codes: 09931
- Vehicle registration: DEG
- Website: www.plattling.de

Plattling (German pronunciation: [ˈplatlɪŋ]) is a town in the district of Deggendorf, Bavaria, Germany, on the river Isar, 9 km southwest of Deggendorf, just before it enters the Danube.

== Attractions ==
Romanesque Jewel – Church Saint Jakob

Romanesque pillars basilica with font (12th century), Saint Jakobus statue (16th century), late Gothic winged altar with Mary and Child, Maria Magdalena, Saint Jakobus, Saint Katharina and Saint Nikolaus – Sacrament chapel from 1515 – Murals in the choir from 1606 and 15th century.

Town Parish Church Saint Magdalena

A Baroque building built in 1760 on the grounds at which, since 1379, the market church once stood. 1931 Saint Magdalena was rendered town parish church.

Museum "Sankt Johann Nepomuk"

The Sankt Johann Nepomukverein (association) Plattling e.V. built the museum "Sankt Johann Nepomuk" on the plot of land of the former river master location of Plattling in honour of Bavarians' 2nd Patron Saint, Sankt Johann Nepomuk, the bridges and water Saint; Opening and inauguration on 16 May 2004.

The Plattling Nibelungen Festival

A highlight of and for Plattling is the Nibelungen Festival, which takes place every four years. The people of Plattling dress up for a few days in medieval costumes and play their story on an open-air stage. The functions alternate between festival, historic market and the main square. You can find traces of the Nibelungs in Plattling for example in the Bürgerspital garden. There stands the sculpture "Siegfried" from Gabi Hanner and in the town hall the large glass picture "Kriemhilds' Dream" is exhibited.

== Sport ==
There are a wave/hole near the town centre in the river, which is one of Europe's best play spots for freestyle kayaking. In 2011 the ICF world championship in freestyle kayak was held there.

== Twin towns – sister cities ==
Plattling is twinned with:

- Scharnitz, Austria
- Selkirk, Scotland, United Kingdom

== Notable people ==
- Nicki (born 1966), singer
