= Zwiesel–Bodenmais railway =

Railway line in Lower Bavaria, Germany

Zwiesel–Bodenmais
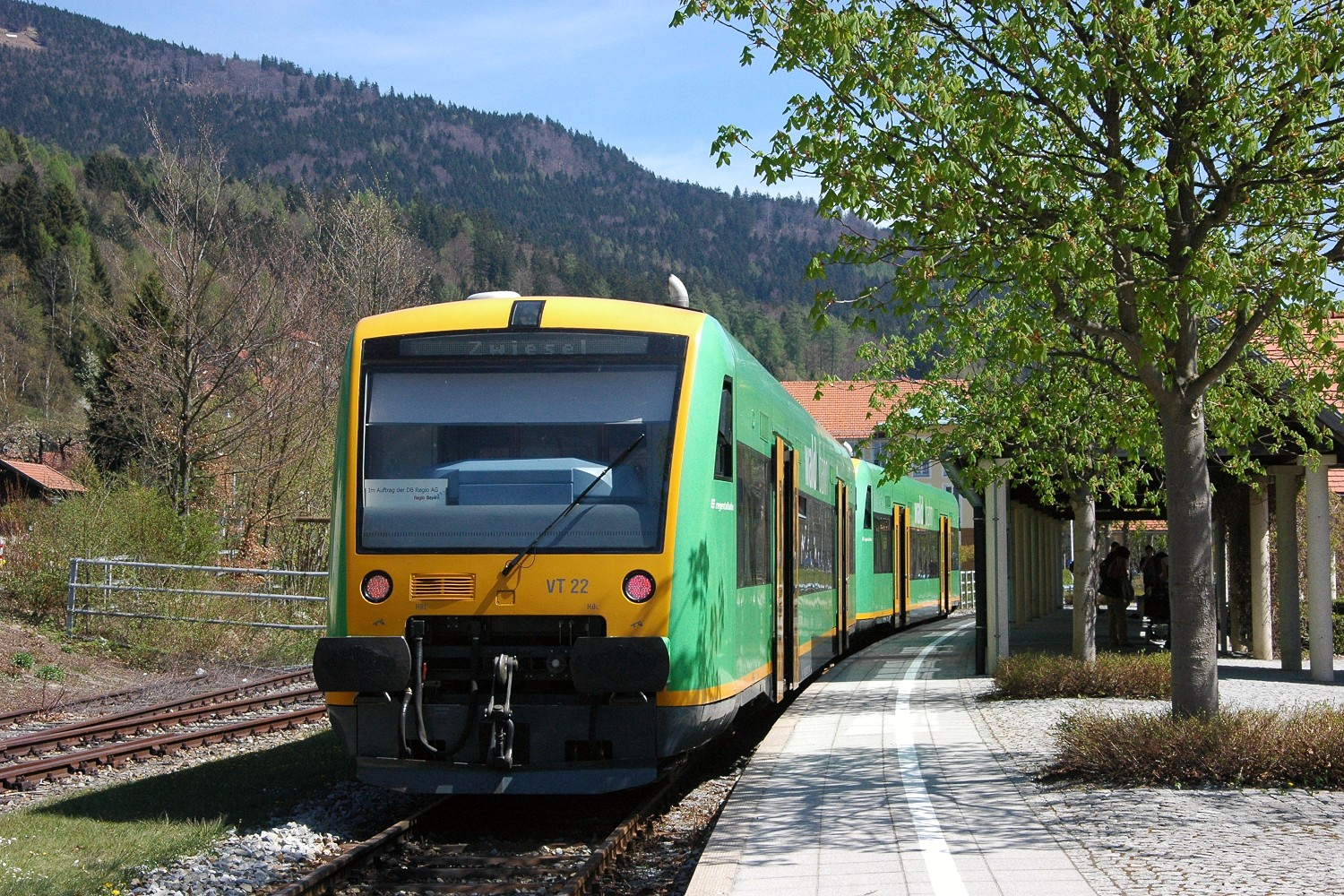
- Zwiesel–Bodenmais railway

Overview
- Line number: 5820

Service
- Route number: 907

Technical
- Line length: 14.5 km
- Track gauge: 1,435 mm
- Operating speed: 50 km/h max.

The Zwiesel–Bodenmais railway was the last railway line to be built in Lower Bavaria, a province of the state of Bavaria in southeast Germany. Nowadays, it is route number 907 in the timetable. Construction started in 1921 as part of a move to support this depressed area and it was taken into service on 3 September 1928. The 14.3 km long stub line connects to the Bavarian Forest railway from Plattling to Eisenstein opened on 16 September 1877 and also to the line to Grafenau, Bavaria (KBS 906), opened on 1 September 1890.

== History ==
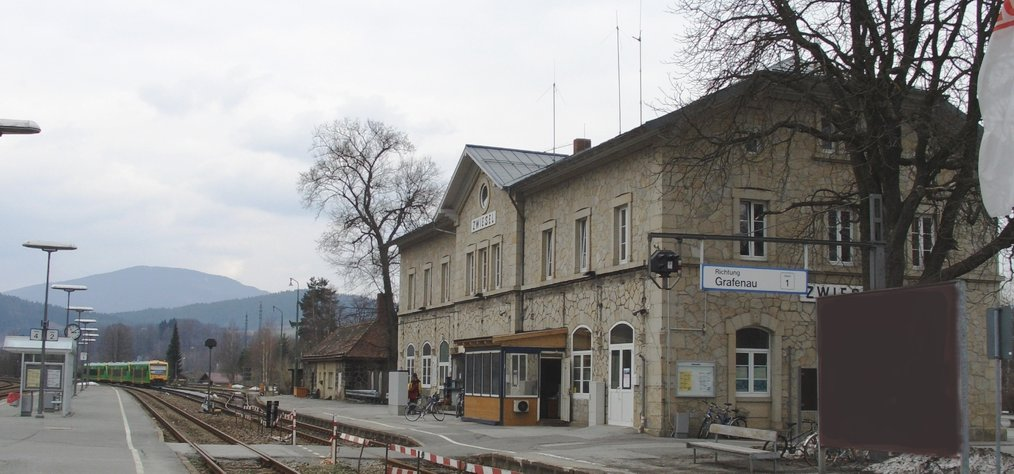
Zwiesel station

On 9 August 1928, the first test run on the line took place. At the official opening on 3 September 1928, people massed at the stations and halts and the newly opened railway carried about 2,500 passengers to Bodenmais that day. All the reports expressed hopes that the line would soon be extended through the Zeller Valley (Zellertal).

The planned extension from Bodenmais through the Zeller Valley to Kötzting did not come to fruition however, because in 1927 the privately run Regentalbahn had opened a railway from Gotteszell to Blaibach just a few kilometres away and, as a result, a connexion between the Forest Railway and the railway network via Cham already existed. There were also important opponents of the extension, und so the construction of the line from Bodenmais to Kötzting was cancelled in the early 1930s on the grounds that the local communities were unable to agree on it.

Soon after the opening of the route, its low profitability became clear. As early as the 1960s, there were rumours of its approaching closure. In the 1970s and 80s, this topic was repeatedly taken up in the media. In January 1984, there was a major television debate over the continued existence of the line. On 27 September 1984, the Nuremberg railway division admitted that it had been trying for 15 years to reach a decision over the future over the very poorly utilised Zwiesel–Bodenmais route. Despite all fears, the line remained open.

== Present-day ==
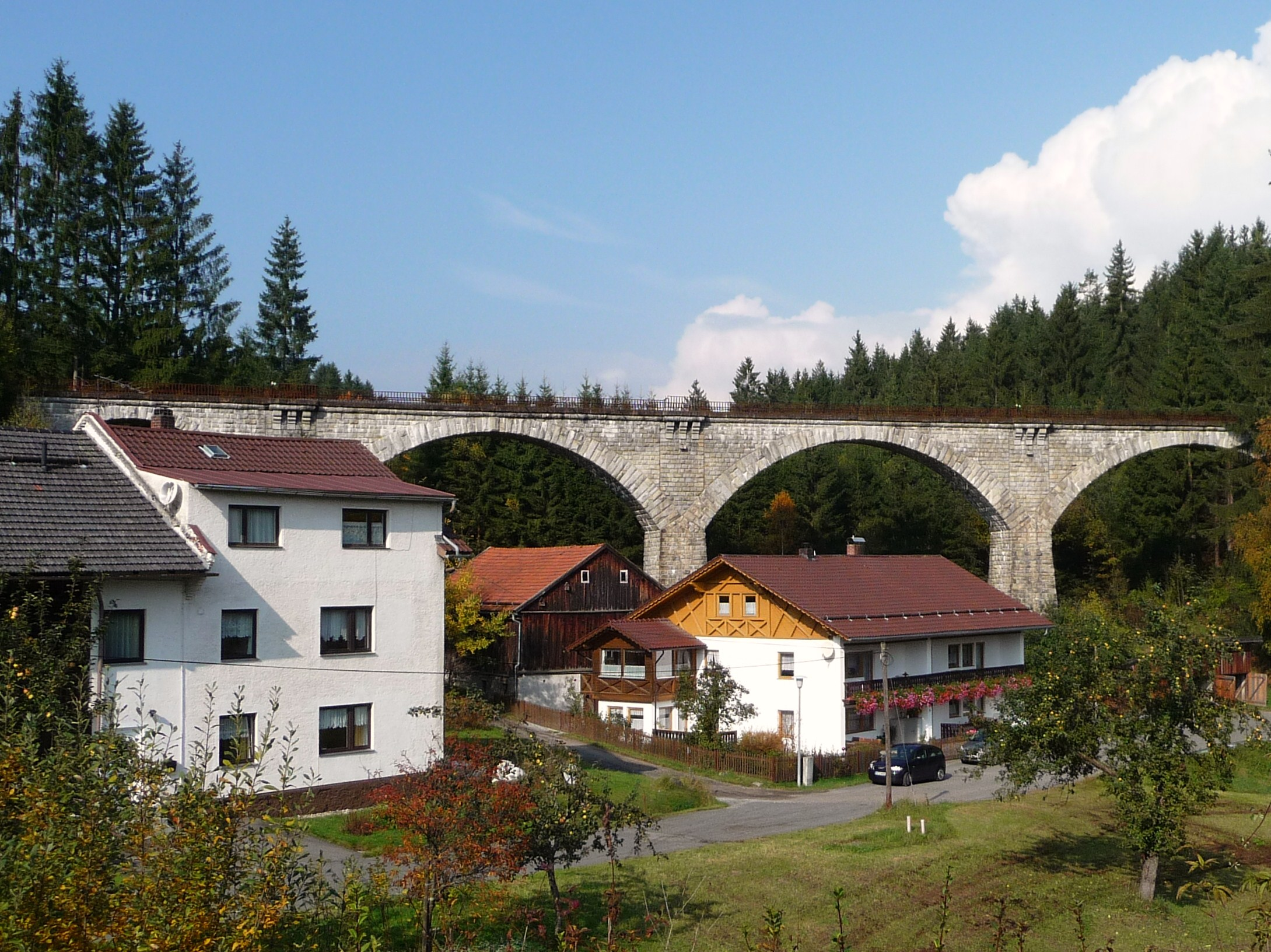
The railway viaduct at Reisachmühle

The line from Zwiesel to Bodenmais has three request stops: at Aussenried, Langdorf and Böhmhof. Only Zwiesel station is still staffed. In 1987, the station property in Bodenmais was bought by Bodenmais market in order to erect a new building there, that serves as a town hall and tourist information centre.

In the second half of the 20th century, the line was worked by Uerdingen railbuses. From 1993, the Regentalbahn ran this route under contract from the DB with their old Esslingen railbuses, since 1996, these run every hour. The operation has been continued since 1997 by the Regentalbahn with Regio-Shuttles, the journey time being just 19 minutes. The fare deals have been popular with locals and tourists alike.

== Sources ==
de:Bahnstrecke Zwiesel–Bodenmais

== See also ==
- Bavarian branch lines
