= Gotteszell–Blaibach railway =

Railway line in Germany

Gotteszell–Blaibach
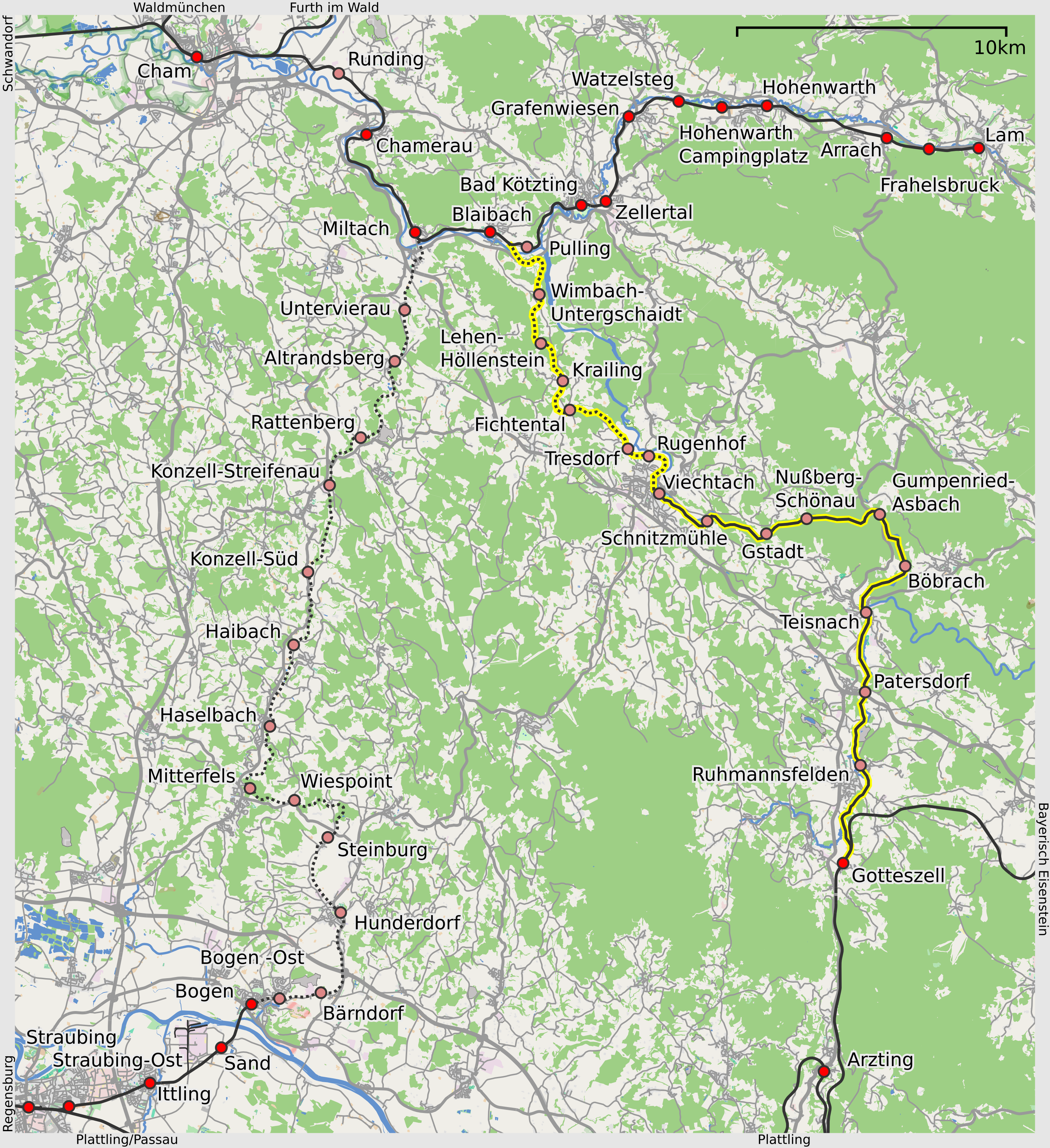

Technical
- Line length: 39.8 km (24.7 mi)
- Track gauge: 1,435 mm (4.708 ft)
- Operating speed: 50 max.
- Maximum incline: 2.55 %

The Gotteszell–Blaibach railway is a railway line in the state of Bavaria in southern Germany that runs from Gotteszell in Lower Bavaria to Blaibach in the Upper Palatinate.

== Construction of the line from Gotteszell to Viechtach ==
Following the construction of the Schwandorf–Furth im Wald railway in 1861 and the Bavarian Forest Railway in 1877 a desire grew to link the valley of the Black Regen between Teisnach and Blaibach with these two lines. The Royal Bavarian State Railways had decided in favour of a branch line (Lokalbahn) from Cham to Kötzting, however.

So the Lokalbahn AG in Munich was tasked to carry out the project work. Their plan envisaged the railway line branching off from the Bavarian Forest Railway at Gotteszell and reaching its terminus after 24.97 kilometres in Viechtach. On 28 April 1889 the concession for the construction of the Gotteszell–Viechtach Lokalbahn.

The line cost the Lokalbahn AG exactly 1,783,148 gold marks to build. On 20 November 1890 the railway was taken into service. In its first full operating year 107,630 passengers and around 25,000 tonnes of goods were transported, resulting in a profit of 27,181 marks. In 1900 the profit even reached 76,278 marks. The Teisnach paper factory played a large part in that.

== Extension to Blaibach ==
For years efforts had been made to have an extension built to Blaibach. On 21 October 1904 the Minister of Transport, Heinrich von Frauendorfer, set so many conditions that the attempts were initially dropped.

In 1919 the track of the branch line was replaced. Instead of Bavarian Type V rails with a weight per metre of 21.8 kilograms (48 lb), Bavarian Type IX rails were used with a weight per metre of 34.8 kilograms (77 lb). The rail length was now 15 metres instead of 9. And now there was at last a plan to build a railway line through the Zeller Valley, the proponents for which pressed for an extension to Blaibach. From 1924 to 1925 the extension of the railway was assessed.

In order to build the extension the station in Viechtach had to be extended by 150 metres. In July 1926 work began. Only relief workers (Notstandsarbeiter) were allowed to be used for its construction. The largest structure on the 14.8 kilometre long extension was the bridge over the River Regen near Blaibach, an unsupported concrete bridge with a 70-metre span. On 20 December 1927 the line was opened to traffic. On 2 January 1928 goods services began and they were followed by the first passenger services on 1 February 1928.

In addition, the Gotteszell–Viechtach railway and Deggendorf–Metten railway were joined by the Regentalbahn AG on 1 February. On 3/4 March 1928 the actual opening celebrations took place. The railway was subsequently known as the Regentalbahn.

== Operations, closure and hiking trail ==
When the Blaibach line opened four pairs of trains ran daily between Viechtach und Blaibach. On the old line three pairs of trains ran daily on weekdays and four on Sundays and public holidays. The vehicle fleet used was particularly interesting, because they used second-hand stock that could be procured cheaply from other railways. The first railbus ran through the Regen valley as early as 1902.

In Gumpenried in 1984 the line was raised and straightened as part of work to build a power station. On 2 February 1991 the section from Blaibach to Viechtach was closed due to damage to the Regen Bridge near and on 30 April 1991 the Viechtach–Gotteszell was also closed. In 1992 the line was finally shut from Viechtach to Blaibach. The districts of Cham and Regen procured the line and built a cycle path on it in 1997. On the remaining section of the line the Wanderbahn im Regental company operates the Gotteszell-Viechtach tourist line.

== Trial operation ==
In 2014, the Bavarian Minister of Infrastructure, Martin Zeil, announced a two-year trial of rail services between Gotteszell and Viechtach from September 2016 to September 2018. This was the result of local requirements to improve local infrastructure. Two options were envisaged. If the trial were successful, achieving a minimum usage of 1000 passengers per day, the Bavarian ministry would authorise regular rail services between Gotteszell and Viechtach and provide all the funding. If the trial failed, the county of Regen would have to shoulder 10% of all costs for the service. As a result of protests because of the change from school buses to trains, which meant longer journeys for schoolchildren, a vote was held in February 2015 to ascertain the views of the local population. Over 63% of those who voted said they would welcome regular train services. Following this result, the first steps were taken to prepare for regular services: railway lines, bridges and the tunnel were repaired, signal boxes were built at several level crossings, and stations were renovated or rebuilt. According to current plans, the trains will operate an hourly and stop over at the stations of Ruhmannsfelden, Patersdorf, Teisnach Technologiecampus (new), Teisnach (crossing station), Gumpenried-Asbach and Schnitzmühle. The Regentalbahn will be operating the route with modern RegioShuttles called Waldbahn ("forest railway") trains.

== See also ==
- Royal Bavarian State Railways
- Bavarian branch lines
- List of closed railway lines in Bavaria

== Sources ==
- Walther Zeitler (1985), Eisenbahnen in Niederbayern und in der Oberpfalz (in German), Weiden: Buch & Kunstverlag Oberpfalz, ISBN 3-924350-01-9
- Gerd Wolff (2002), Deutsche Klein- und Privatbahnen. Band 7: Bayern (in German), Freiburg: EK-Verlag, ISBN 3-88255-666-8
