= Barbora =

Barbora (Czech: [ˈbarbora]; Slovak: [ˈbarbɔra]) is a Czech and Slovak female given name. It was derived from the Greek word barbaros (Greek: βαρβαρος) meaning "foreign", a variant of "Barbara". It is the 36th most popular given name in the Czech Republic (as of 2007). Notable people with the name include:

- Barbora Bobuľová (born 1974), Slovak actress
- Barbora Bukovská (attorney), Czech-Slovak human rights attorney
- Barbora Dibelková (born 1983), Czech race walker
- Barbora Markéta Eliášová (1874–1957), Czech writer, traveler, educator
- Barbora Kodetová (born 1970), Czech actress
- Barbora Krejčíková (born 1995), Czech tennis player
- Barbora Rezlerová-Švarcová (1890–1941), Slovak feminist and communist journalist
- Barbora Schacková (1873/4–1958), Sudeten German politician
- Barbora Seemanová (born 2000), Czech swimmer
- Barbora Silná (born 1989), Czech-Austrian ice dancer
- Barbora Špotáková (born 1981), Czech javelin thrower
- Barbora Štefková (born 1995), Czech tennis player
- Barbora Strýcová (born 1986), Czech tennis player

== See also ==
- Barbara (given name)
- Varvara (disambiguation)
