= Deggendorf Hauptbahnhof =

Railway station in Bavaria, Germany

Deggendorf Hbf
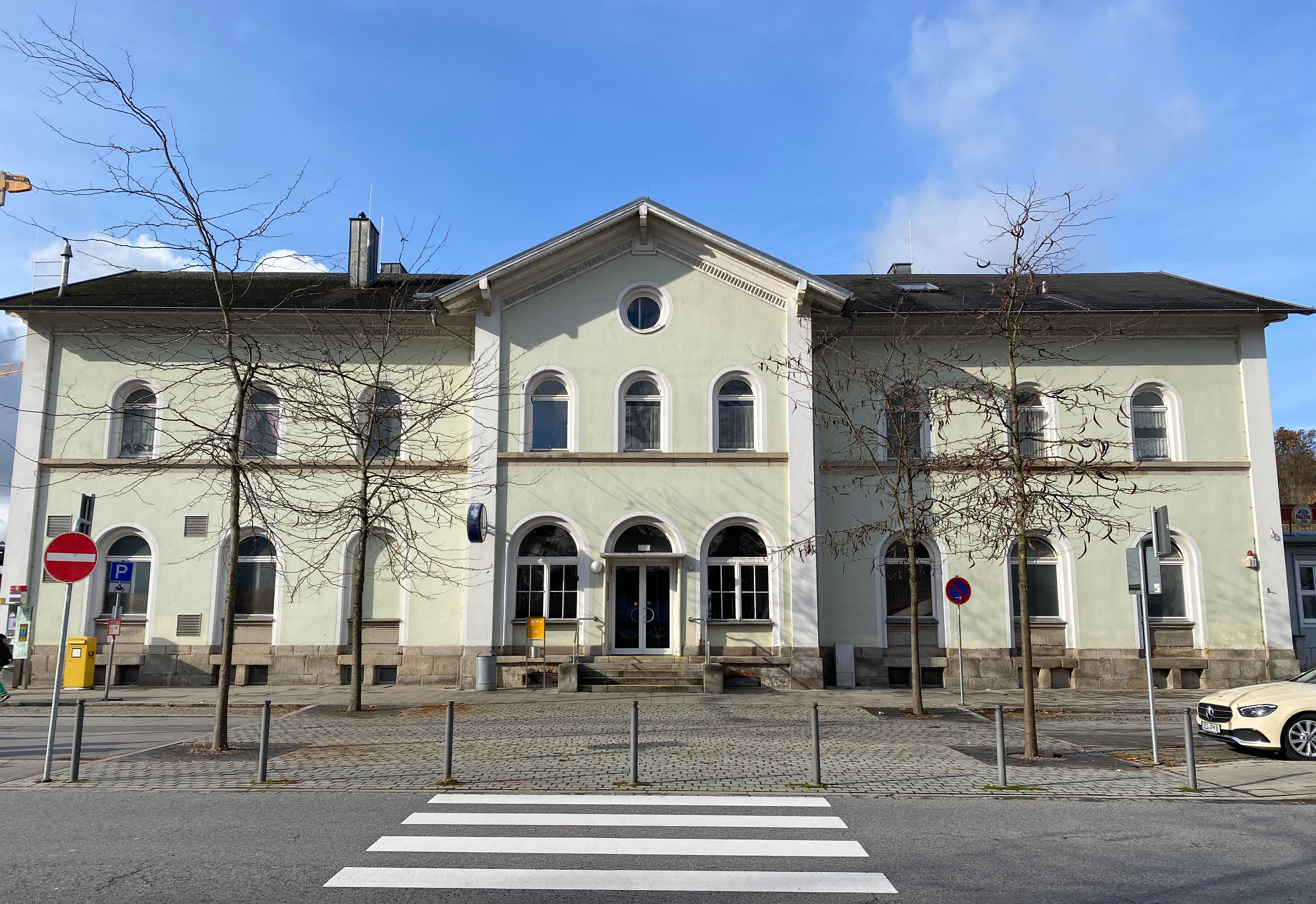

General information
- Location: Deggendorf, Bavaria; Germany
- Coordinates: 48°50′22″N 12°57′00″E
- Owner: Deutsche Bahn
- Operator: DB Netz; DB Station&Service
- Lines: Plattling–Bayerisch Einstein; Deggendorf–Kalteneck; Deggendorf–Metten
- Platforms: 3
- Connections: 1 2 3 4 4112 4113 4116 4117 4120 4136 4142 4154 6142 6143 6144 6145 6146 6147 6149 6153 6154 6155 6156 6157 6159 7591 7631 7638

Construction
- Accessible: Yes

Other information
- Station code: 1149
- DS100 code: NDG
- Category: 5
- Website: stationsdatenbank.de; www.bahnhof.de

History
- Opened: 1877

Passengers
- < 2,500 (2006)

Services
Preceding station		Following station
Pankofen towards Plattling	RB 35	Grafling-Arzting towards Bayerisch Eisenstein
Location
- Location within Bavaria Location within Germany Location within Europe

Deggendorf Hauptbahnhof a railway station in the German state of Bavaria, classified by Deutsche Bahn as a category 5 station. It is not currently part of any transport association, so standard DB fares apply. It is planned that it will be integrated in the network area of the Transport Community of Deggendorf District (Verkehrsgemeinschaft Landkreis Deggendorf).

== History ==
The branch line from Plattling to Deggendorf was opened in 1866. This line was extended into the Bavarian Forest in 1874. The entire line was completed in 1877, when Deggendorf station was also opened. This was followed by the construction of additional lines. Thus, the line to Metten opened on 17 October 1891 and another line was opened initially to Hengersberg on 26 November 1913 and was completed to Kalteneck in the municipality of Hutthurm on 1 August 1914. Due to the increased importance of the station it was renamed as Deggendorf Hauptbahnhof (main station) on 5 May 1941.

== Building ==
The two-storey entrance building was built in 1877 in a historicist style with a low pitched roof and is now under protection as a monument. It has a gabled avant-corps and a porch on the "home" platform. This is connected via an underpass to an island platform. The platform that used to be used for operations on the now disused Deggendorf–Metten line is now dismantled. A goods shed built at the end of the 19th century as a bare brick construction with a low pitched roof is also protected as a cultural monument.

== Services ==
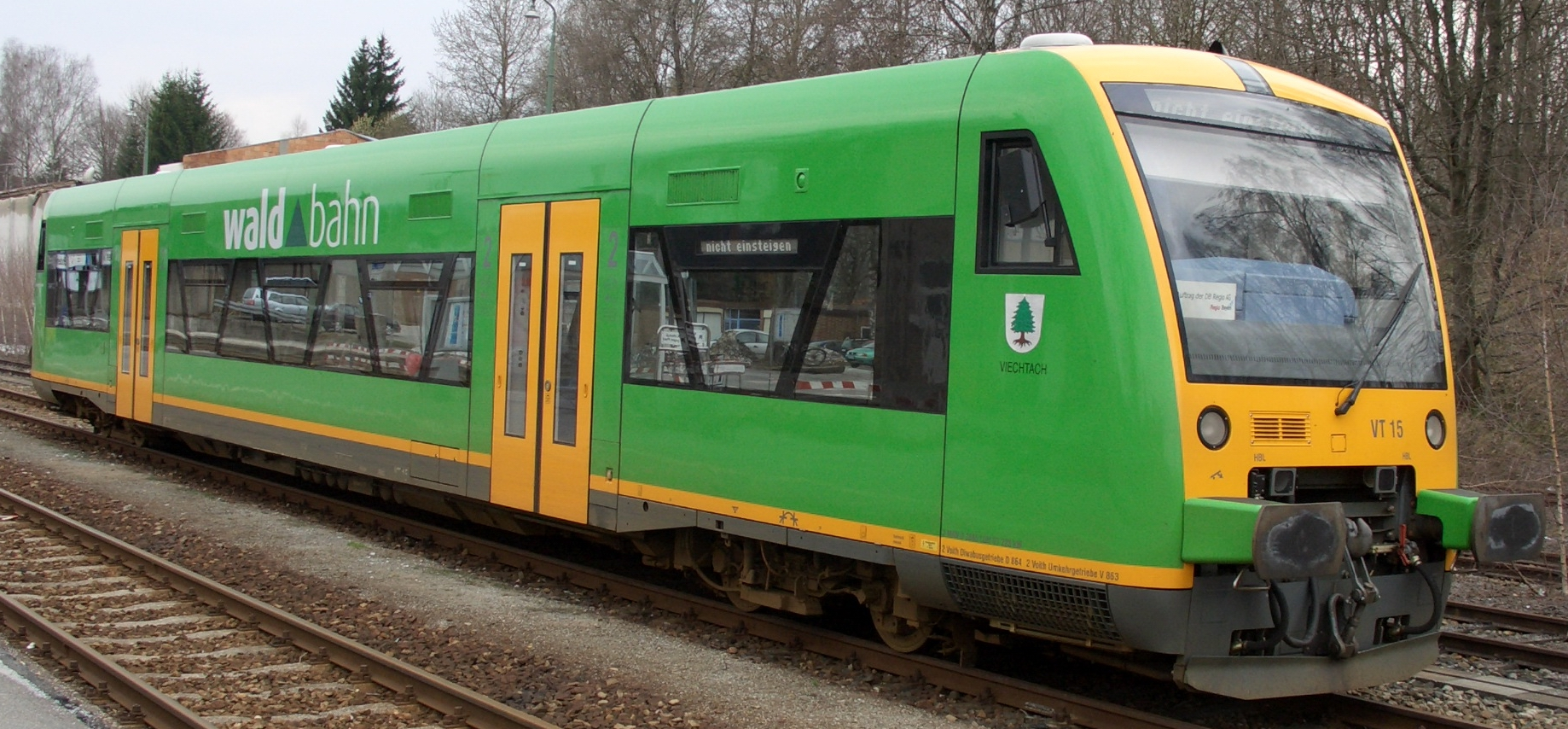
DMU VT 15 operating as the Waldbahn in Zwiesel station

The train is served exclusively by regional services operated by Regentalbahn with Stadler Regio-Shuttle RS1 diesel multiple units. It is operated on behalf of DB Regio as a Regionalbahn service. The line is not electrified.

Train class	Route	Frequency	Name
RB 35	Plattling – Deggendorf – Gotteszell – Regen – Zwiesel (Bay) – Bayerisch Eisenstein	Hourly	Waldbahn
