= Zwiesel (Bay) station =

Railway station in Zwiesel, Germany

Zwiesel (Bay)
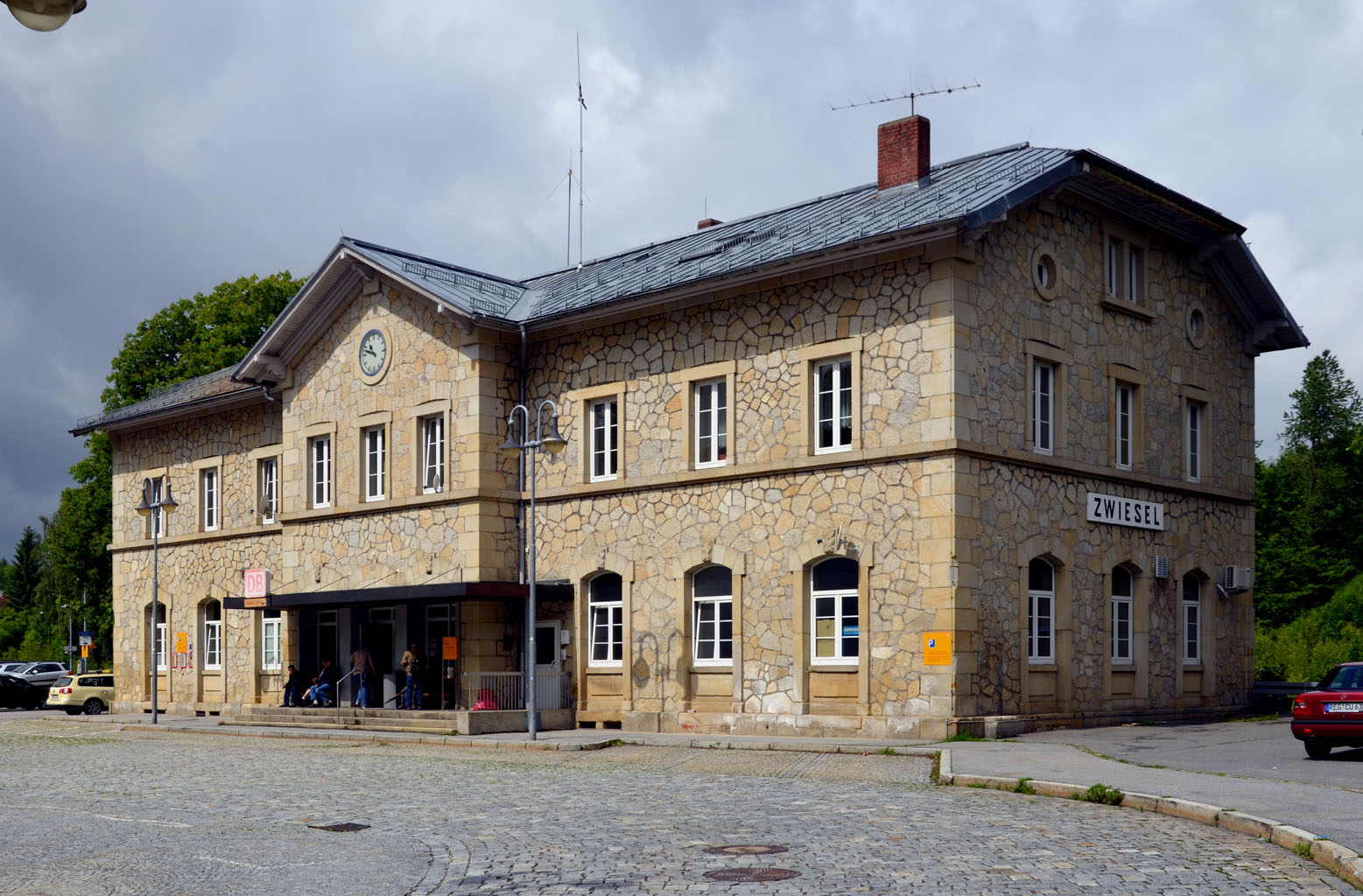
- Zwiesel station from the street side (2012)

General information
- Location: Bahnhofsplatz 3 Zwiesel, Bavaria; Germany
- Coordinates: 49°01′15″N 13°13′36″E
- Owner: Deutsche Bahn
- Operator: DB Netz; DB Station&Service
- Lines: Plattling–Bayerisch Einstein (120.7 km); Zwiesel–Grafenau (0.0 km); Zwiesel–Bodenmais (0.0 km)
- Platforms: 4

Construction
- Accessible: Yes

Other information
- Station code: 7072
- DS100 code: NZWL
- IBNR: 8006684
- Category: 5
- Website: stationsdatenbank.de; www.bahnhof.de

History
- Opened: 15 November 1877

Services
| Preceding station | | Following station |
|---|---|---|
| Bettmannsäge towards Plattling | RB 35 | Ludwigsthal towards Bayerisch Eisenstein |
| Terminus | RB 36 | Lichtenthal towards Grafenau |
| Außenried towards Bodenmais | RB 37 | Terminus |
Location

Zwiesel station is the most important railway hub in the Bavarian Forest. It is the only station of the Lower Bavarian town of Zwiesel. Apart from this station, the town also contains Lichtenthal station in the Zwiesel district of Lichtenthal. It is classified by Deutsche Bahn as a category 3 station and has four platform tracks. Zwiesel is located on the railway between Plattling and Bayerisch Eisenstein/Železná Ruda-Alžbětín, also called the Bavarian Forest Railway (Bayerische Waldbahn). In Zwiesel station the lines to Grafenau and to Bodenmais branch off the Bavarian Forest Railway. The lines are maintained by DB Regio and the services are operated by Regentalbahn.

== History ==
The station of the glass-making town of Zwiesel was opened on 15 November 1877 along with the Bavarian Forest Railway. Since 1 September 1890, the station has been the starting point of the Zwiesel–Grafenau line. The Zwiesel–Bodenmais branch line was opened on 3 September 1928. Based on the four railway lines that run in all directions, the network around the station is also known as the Zwiesel spider (Zwieseler Spinne).

Station was strafed by 14th FG P-38s on 16 February 1945 along with a locomotive and 2 x box cars.

== Infrastructure ==
A new island platform was created between September 2006 and July 2007. The platform has three platform edges, numbered 2, 4 (a bay platform) and 5. The height of the platform was raised to 55 cm to allow level access to the trains. During the renovation of the island platform, a style of platform roofing type was used for the first time, which is now known as "Zwiesel" roofing and has since been installed at several other stations. The “home” platform has a platform height of 22 cm. €600,000 has been made available to allow it to be raised to 55 cm by the summer of 2013. The rebuilt platform will be 90 metres long. This will give level access to trains from all parts of the station.

A loading dock is still available to the north of the station building, although the freight station has been closed. The interior of the station building was also renovated during the modernisation of the platforms. Deutsche Bahn operated a DB Service Store until the spring of 2008. This is next to a cafe and a ticket office.

In front of the station, there are several bus stops. The station is a central transfer node for the city, so the station is served by the town bus services operated by Regionalbus Ostbayern and Falkenstein buses.

== Services ==
Until 1987 the Deutsche Bahn VT 601 trains known as the Alpen-See Express (Alpine Lake Express) even brought tourists to Zwiesel and into the Bavarian Forest. Through coaches on the InterCitytrains, IC Arber and IC Bayerwald, ran to Zwiesel until 2000.

Today railway operations, apart from occasional specials, are only run in regular timetabled service using the yellow-green Regio-Shuttles of the Regentalbahn under the operating name of Waldbahn. Trains from the long-distance stop at Plattling, from Bodenmais station and from the border station of Bayerisch Eisenstein (including trains that are run to and from the Czech station at Špičák) meet every hour just before the hour. On every odd-numbered hour, trains from Grafenau also meet at the station.

| Train class | Route | Frequency |
|---|---|---|
| RB 35 | Plattling – Deggendorf – Zwiesel – Bayerisch Eisenstein | Hourly |
| RB 36 | Zwiesel – Spiegelau – Grafenau | Every 2 hours |
| RB 37 | Zwiesel – Bodenmais | Hourly |

No regular goods trains call here any more. However, the station's proximity to the Schott glass factory and the availability of its goods sheds mean that it still sees a large amount of goods traffic. There was also a rail connection to Zwiesel Kristallglas.

== Gallery ==
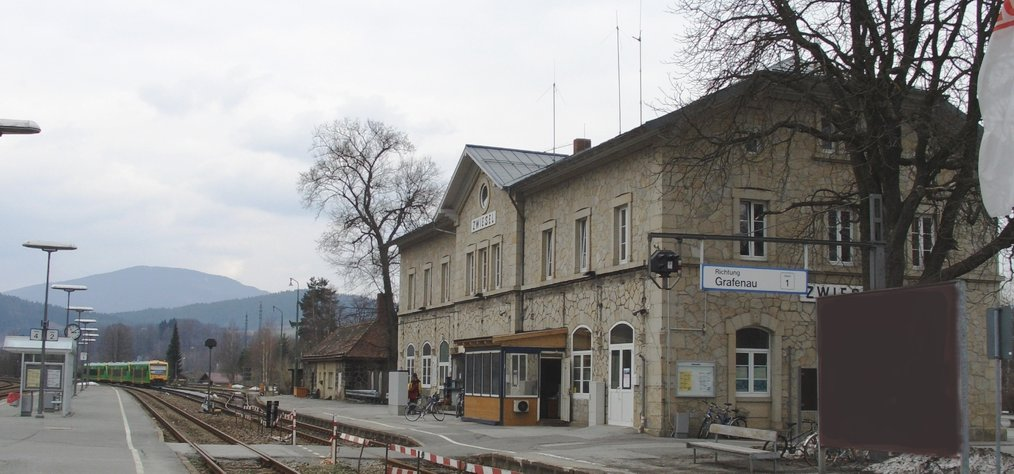
Zwiesel station in 2006, before the renovation

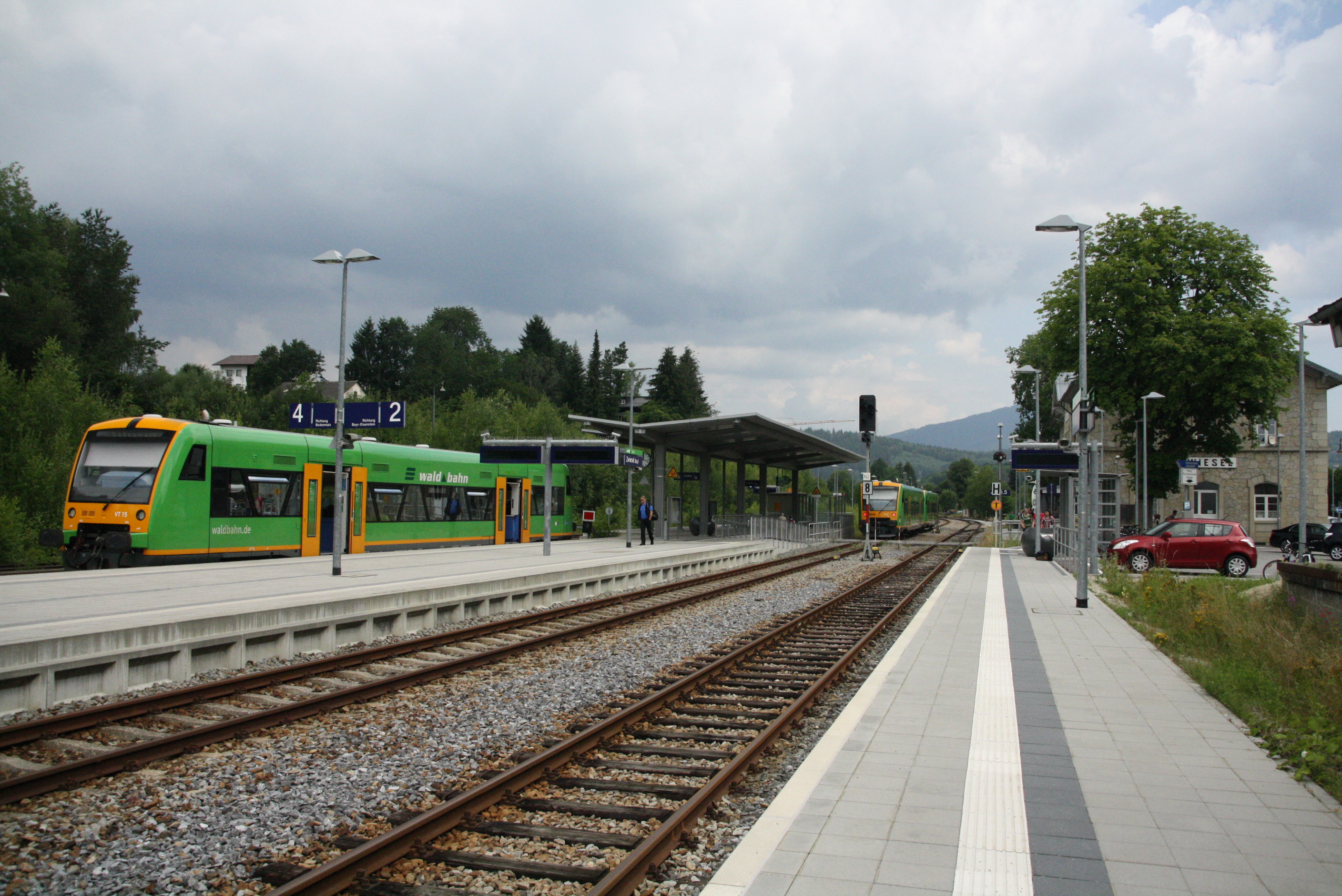
The new platforms of Zwiesel station in 2016

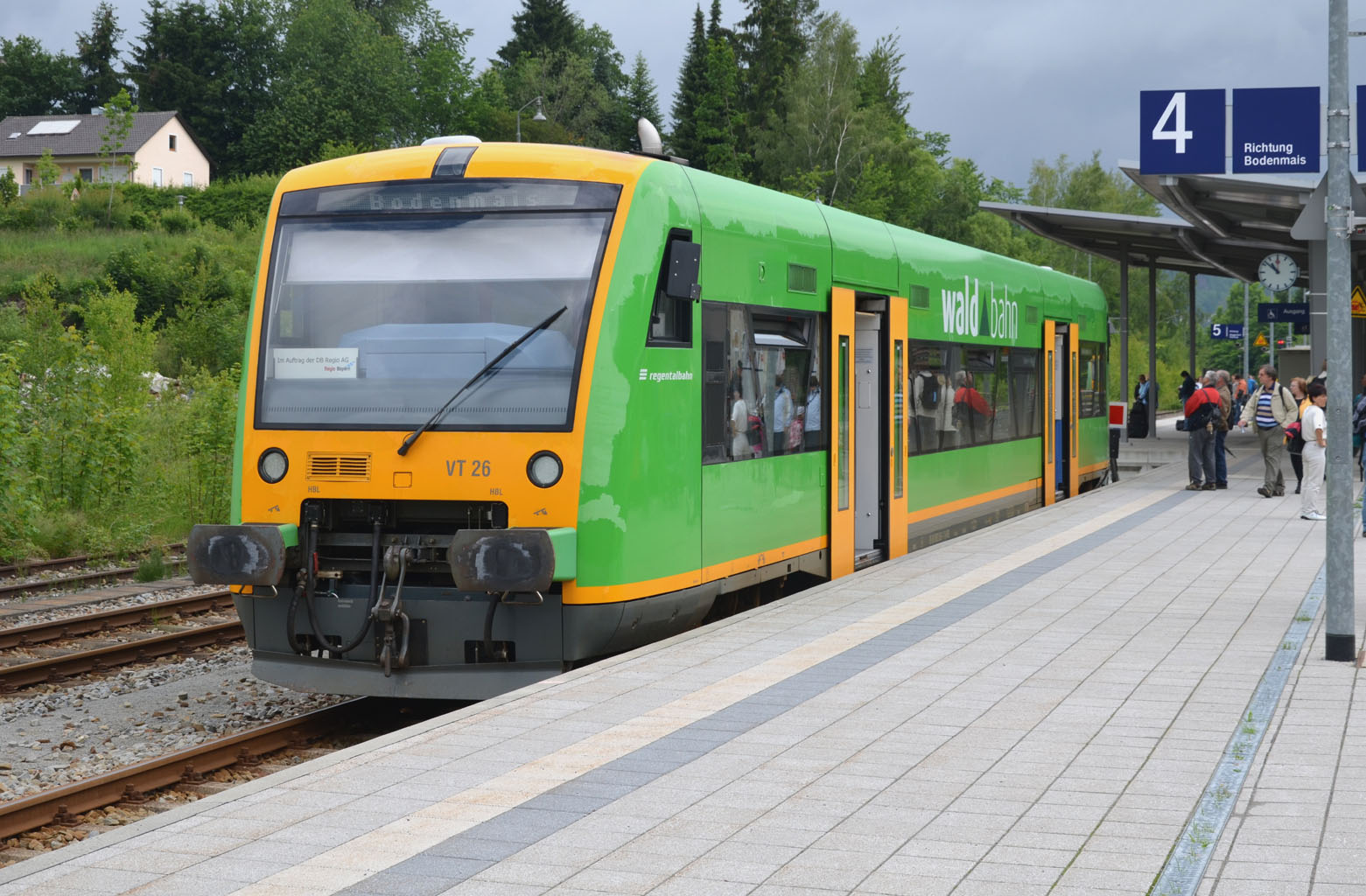
Railcar of the Waldbahn to Bodenmais at the new island platform in Zwiesel in June 2012
