= Barbora Rezlerová-Švarcová =

- Born: 7 July 1890; Blaibach, Kingdom of Bavaria
- Died: 2 September 1941 (aged 51)
- Occupations: Feminist and communist journalist
- Spouse: Ladislav Švarc

Barbora Rezlerová-Švarcová, née Rezlerová (7 July 1890 – 2 September 1941), was a Slovak feminist and communist journalist.

== Life ==
Barbora Rezlerová-Švarcová was born in Blaibach, in the Kingdom of Bavaria on 7 July 1890. Her father, Jozef Rezler, was one of the founders of the Czech Social Democratic Party. When she was a child, the family moved to Košín, Bohemia, and she became a textile worker. Sometime during World War I, she moved to Prague and became a cook. While living there, she married the communist activist, Ladislav Švarc and they had two sons together. They moved to Banská Bystrica (now in Slovakia) when he became the regional secretary of the Communist Party of Czechoslovakia there in 1921. Often harassed for their views by the government, they moved to Prague in 1925 and then to the Soviet Union the following year where she studied at the State Institute of Journalism in Moscow. She later worked at the newspaper Izvestia and for the radio station of the Comintern. Sometime in the 1930s, she and her husband divorced. As suspicions of foreigners increased during the Great Purge of the late 1930s, Rezlerová-Švarcová lost her jobs in 1938 and was forced to teach Czech to tourist guides to survive. She was arrested in 1941 and shot on 2 September.

== Activities ==
In 1922–23, she served as the Regional Secretary of the Communist Party organization Slovak Women (Slovak: Slovenské ženy) and then became the editor-in-chief of the Slovak women's communist magazine Proletarian Woman (Slovak: Proletárka) from 1923 to 1925. "She was the first woman journalist in Slovakia to write on feminist issues such as reproductive rights, human rights and the political participation of women, as well as on gender asymmetry in the distribution of political power and legal rights."

== Sources ==
- Juránová, Jana (2005). "Rezlerová-Švarcová (also written Schwartzová), Barbora". In Haan, Francisca de; Daskalova, Krassimira; Loutfi, Anna (eds.). Biographical Dictionary of Women's Movements and Feminisms in Central, Eastern, and South Eastern Europe: 19th and 20th Centuries. New York: Central European University Press. ISBN 978-963-7326-39-4.
