= Zwiesel–Grafenau railway =

Railway line in Germany

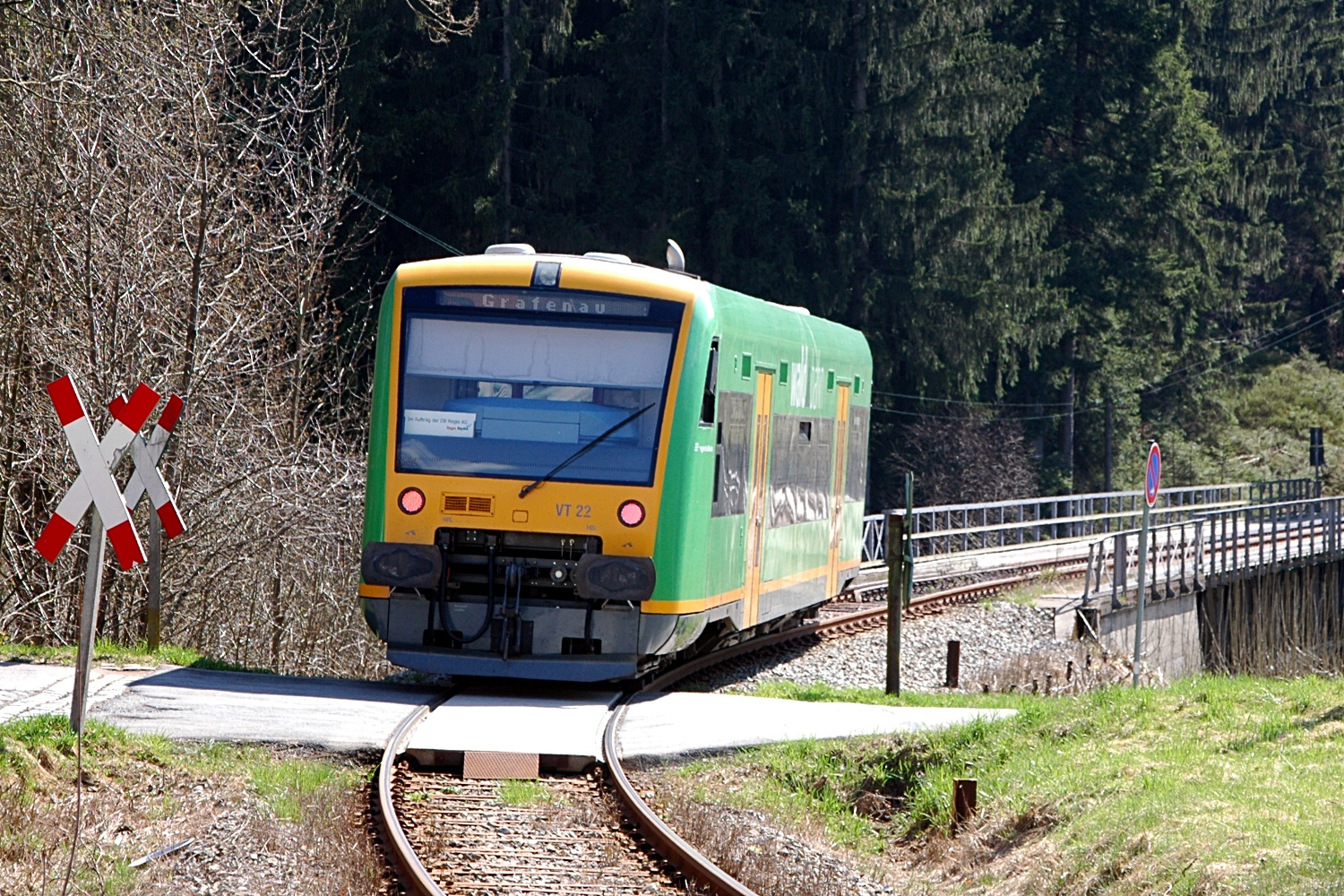
- HGG-Waldbahn-Spiegelau-Ohebrücke

Overview
- Line number: 5821

Service
- Route number: 906

Technical
- Line length: 31.5 km
- Track gauge: 1,435 mm
- Operating speed: 50 km/h max.

The building of the Zwiesel–Grafenau railway, today route number 906 in the timetable, was begun in 1884 by the Royal Bavarian State Railways and taken into service on 1 September 1890. With a total length of 32 km it linked the towns of Zwiesel and Grafenau in the Bavarian Forest. At Zwiesel railway station it connects to the Bavarian Forest railway (Bayerische Waldbahn) from Plattling to Bayerisch Eisenstein, built by the Bavarian Ostbahn and opened on 16 September 1877, as well as the line to Bodenmais opened on 3 September 1928.

On the line are three stations - Zwiesel, Frauenau and Spiegelau, of which only Zwiesel station is staffed - and five small request stops as well as the terminus of Grafenau.

== History ==
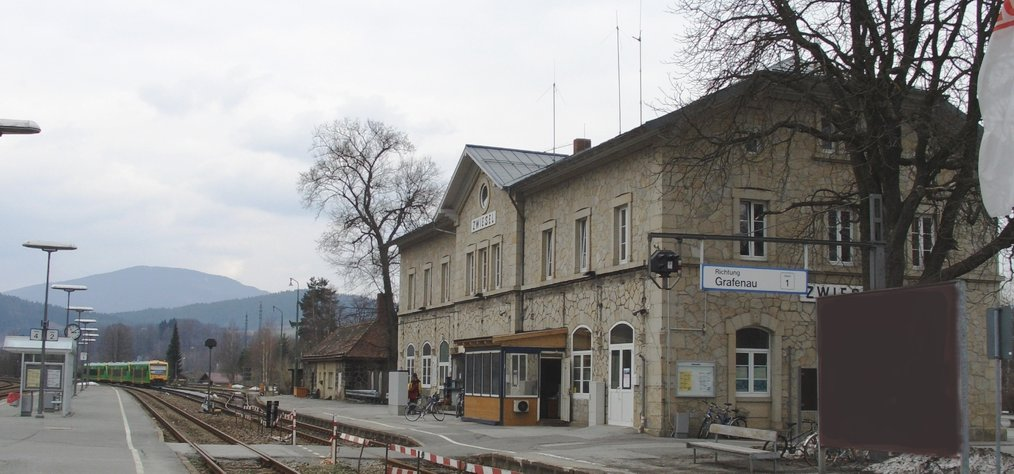
Zwiesel station

An early plan to extend the line as far as Freyung and the Ilztalbahn with its connexion to Passau was stopped by opposition by the town of Grafenau for a railway route via Riedlhütte and St. Oswald with a station on the Schwaimberg. This promised a higher return as a result of having a station in the vicinity of the town centre. So the line was routed via the town of Grafenau with two halts at Grossarmschlag and Rosenau to the terminus. Subsequent plans to extend the line to Fürstenstein, in order to achieve a connexion to Passau that way, were also dropped.

In the beginning two Bavarian D X tank locomotives worked the line. Only two days after the line opened, however, one of these two engines fell down the embankment just before Grafenau; fortunately no-one was injured.

From 1930 to 1960 the privately run Zwieselau Forest Railway terminated in Zwieselau station. This large network of 600-mm narrow gauge track was worked by steam and diesel locomotives that transported logs to the standard railway network. Its loading tracks have long since been lifted by the DB. The former log loading station at Klingenbrunn with its extensive trackage and a connexion to the 600 mm Spiegelau Forest Railway (Spiegelauer Waldbahn) has been reduced today to just one track and classified as a halt (Haltepunkt).

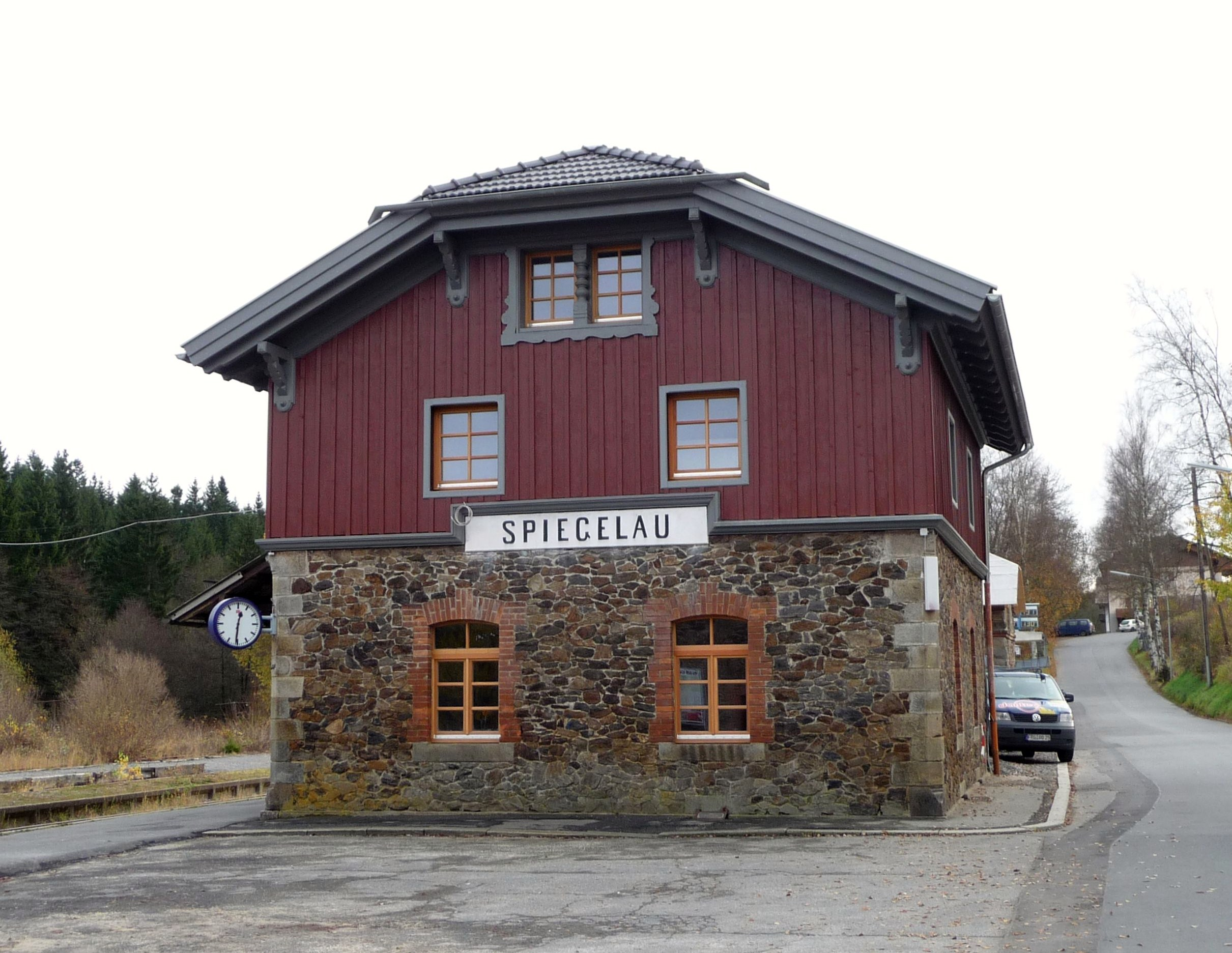
The station at Spiegelau

In 1953 a connexion was temporarily established (until 1956) to Freyung with a road-rail omnibus. In the second half of the 20th century passenger services were provided by Uerdingen railbuses; initially the VT 95 and later the VT 98. In the 1980s discussions again took place about closing the route. Around 1990 the successors to the railbuses, the DB Class V 100s pushed or pulled one or two branch line coaches with driving cars.

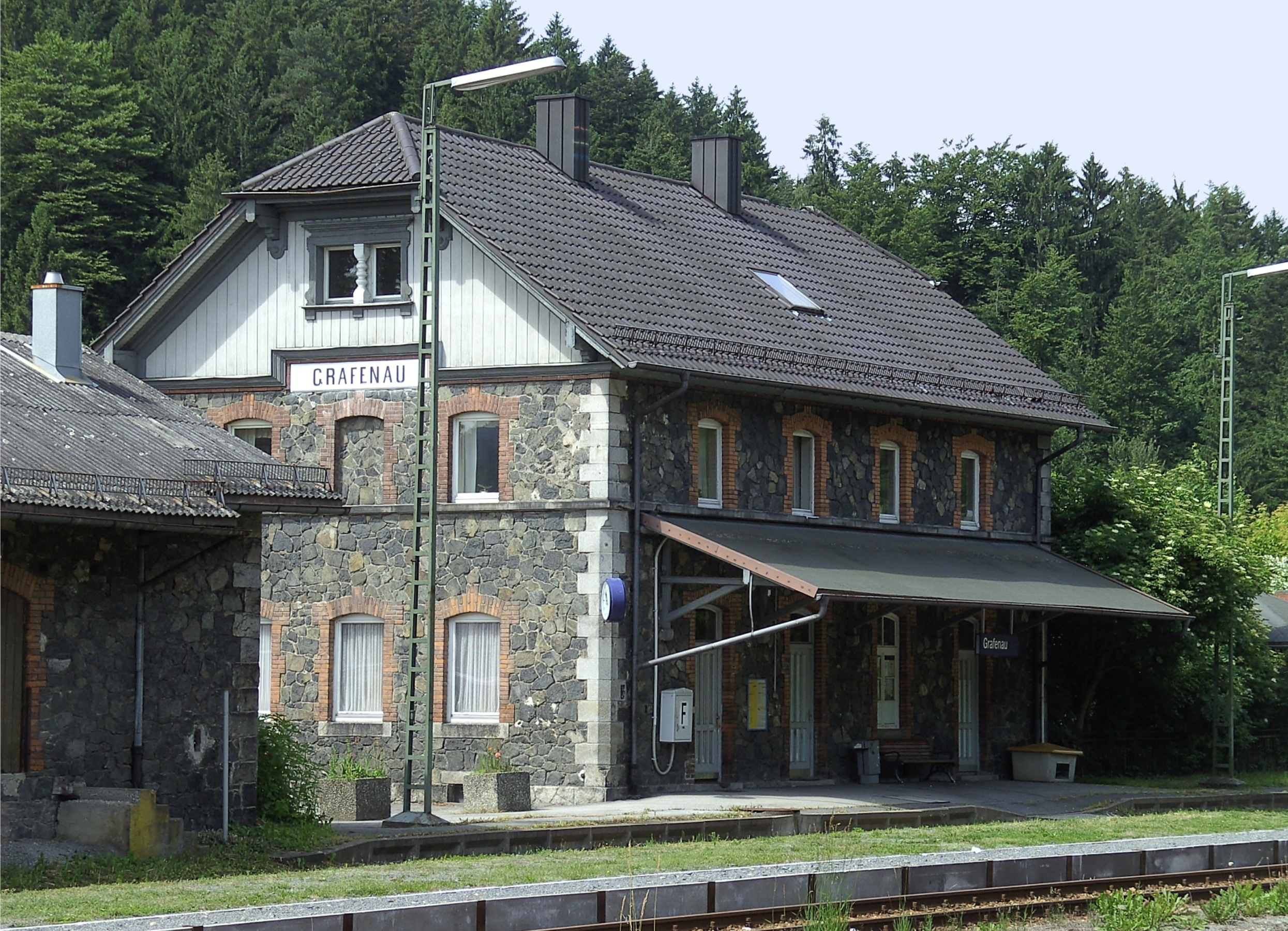
Grafenau station in June 2008

On 24 May 1993 the Regentalbahn took over timetabled services on the route with their Esslingen railbuses under contract from DB-Regio Bayern. For a short time rebuilt VT 09 and VT 10 diesel railcars (formerly DB Class ETA 150), were used here. Since the beginning of 1997 the link has been worked by modern Regio-Shuttle rakes. Goods traffic came to an end on 1 October 1994.

== Current Situation ==
After the line had been thoroughly refurbished in 2002 at a cost of 9.6 million euros, a two-hourly timetable was introduced in 2003 with a journey time of 50 minutes. In summer 2007 the 4.7 km long section of the route between Zwiesel and Zwieselau was completely replaced for 2.3 million euros. In October and November 2008 a further 2.9 km between the stations of Frauenau and Spiegelau was renewed.

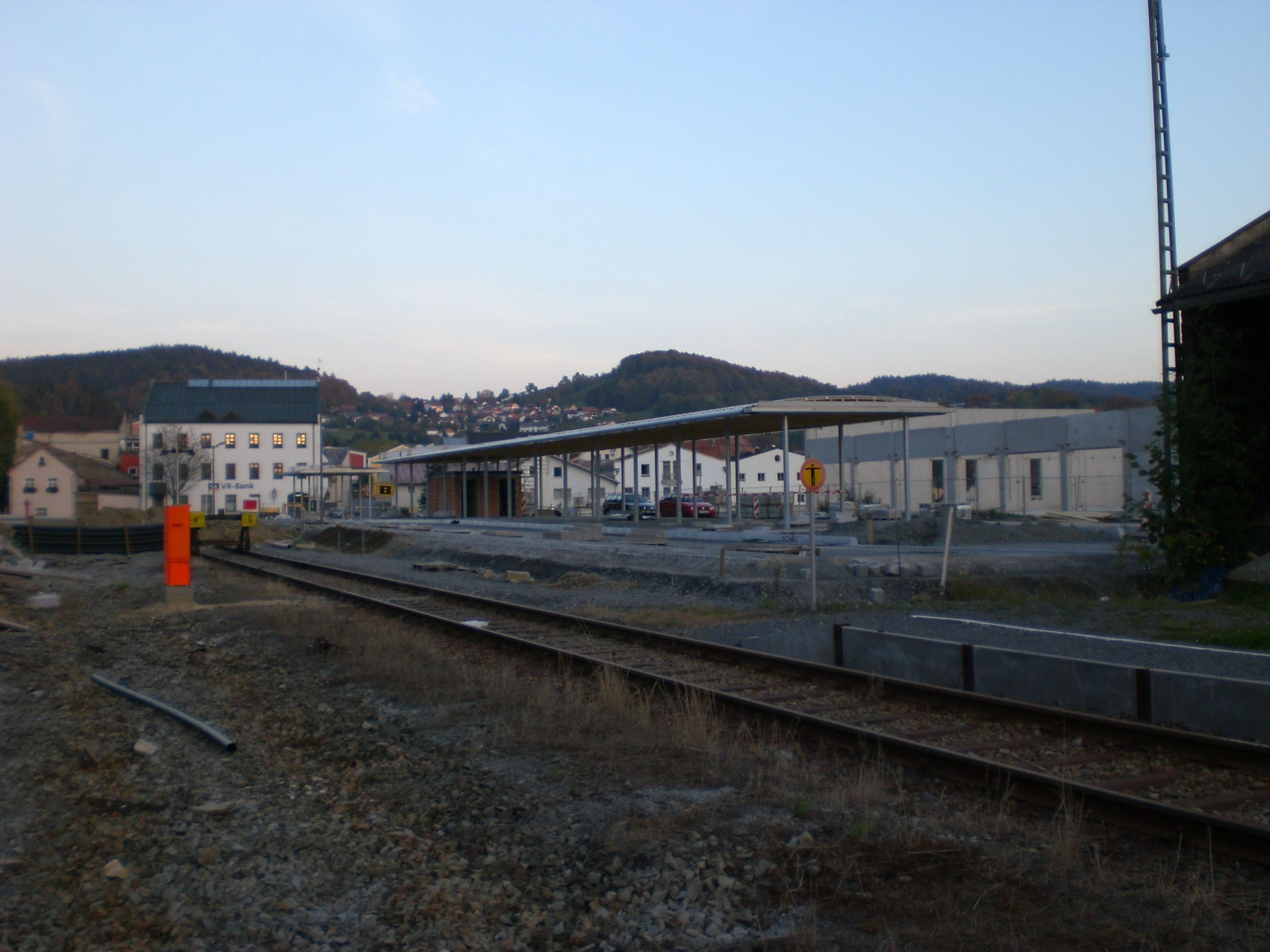
Location of the new platform and bus station in the background. October 2007

Currently Grafenau station is being worked on. The track layout is being shortened as part of a redesign of the station site. The bus station on the station forecourt is being completely rebuilt and the storage sheds in the immediate vicinity of the station are being torn down. These are no longer required since the cessation of goods services in 1994. On these areas a shopping centre and car park is being built. The town of Grafenau and the rural county of Freyung-Grafenau have invested a total of 1.3 million euros in this conversion, which also includes re-routing the roads. In summer 2008 the construction of a new platform was begun, which is east of the present one at the end of the line opposite the bus stop. This will enable a shorter connexion between bus and railway and a barrier-free access to public transport facilities.

Efforts are being made to increase the frequency of rail services to once an hour. Today you can only travel between the times when the train runs on certain buses, in which railway tickets are accepted. In order to enable hourly rail services, however, significant work would be required. The route would have to be upgraded to take faster trains, safety equipment would have to be installed and a crossing point established. The owner of the line, DB Netz AG, has said it is only prepared to do this if the route has permanent safety measures and an order has been secured through the Bayerische Eisenbahngesellschaft. The idea is to enable trains to cross at Spiegelau station, so that, unlike a crossing at the centre of the line in Klingenbrunn, the journey time can be speeded up by several minutes without extending waiting times for connexions at the hub in Zwiesel.

== Sources ==
- de:Bahnstrecke Zwiesel–Grafenau
