= Jiříkovice =

- Municipality
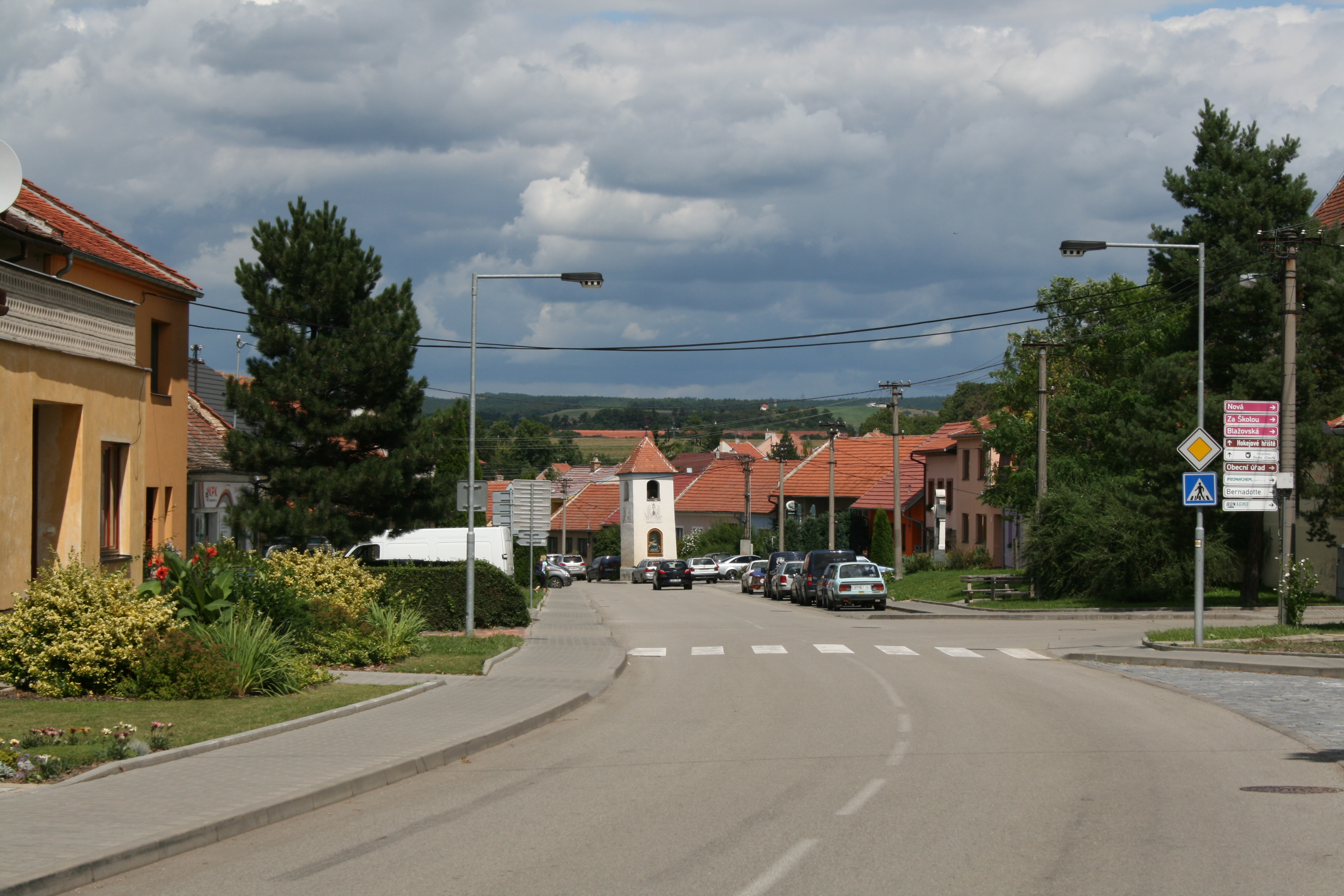
- Centre of Jiříkovice

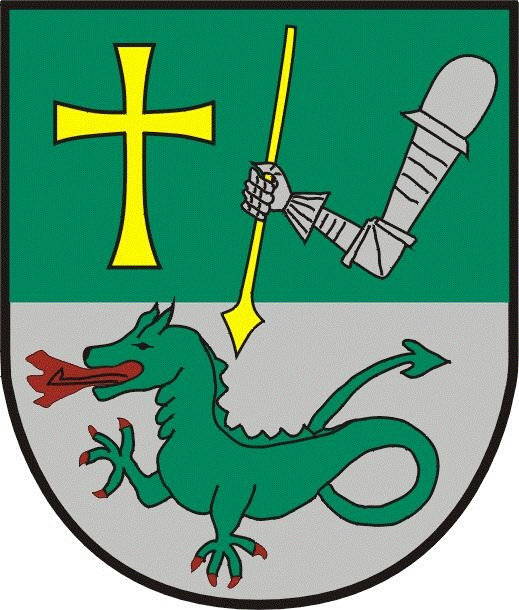
- Flag Coat of arms

- Location in the Czech Republic
- Coordinates: 49°10′0″N 16°45′29″E
- Country: Czech Republic
- Region: South Moravian
- District: Brno-Country
- First mentioned: 1264

Area
  - Total: 4.54 km^{2} (1.75 sq mi)
- Elevation: 228 m (748 ft)

Population (2026-01-01)
  - Total: 987
  - Density: 217/km^{2} (563/sq mi)
- Time zone: UTC+1 (CET)
  - Summer (DST): UTC+2 (CEST)
- Postal code: 664 51
- Website: www.jirikovice.cz

Jiříkovice is a municipality and village in Brno-Country District in the South Moravian Region of the Czech Republic. It has about 1,000 inhabitants.

Jiříkovice lies approximately 12 kilometres (7 mi) east of Brno and 198 km (123 mi) south-east of Prague.

== Demographics ==
Historical population
Year	Pop.	±%
1869	454	—
1880	423	−6.8%
1890	525	+24.1%
1900	574	+9.3%
1910	630	+9.8%
1921	705	+11.9%
1930	778	+10.4%
1950	752	−3.3%
1961	810	+7.7%
1970	815	+0.6%
1980	795	−2.5%
1991	808	+1.6%
2001	869	+7.5%
2011	868	−0.1%
2021	949	+9.3%
Source: Censuses

== Notable people ==
- Barbora Markéta Eliášová (1874–1957), writer, traveller and educator
