= Freilassing–Berchtesgaden railway =

German railway line

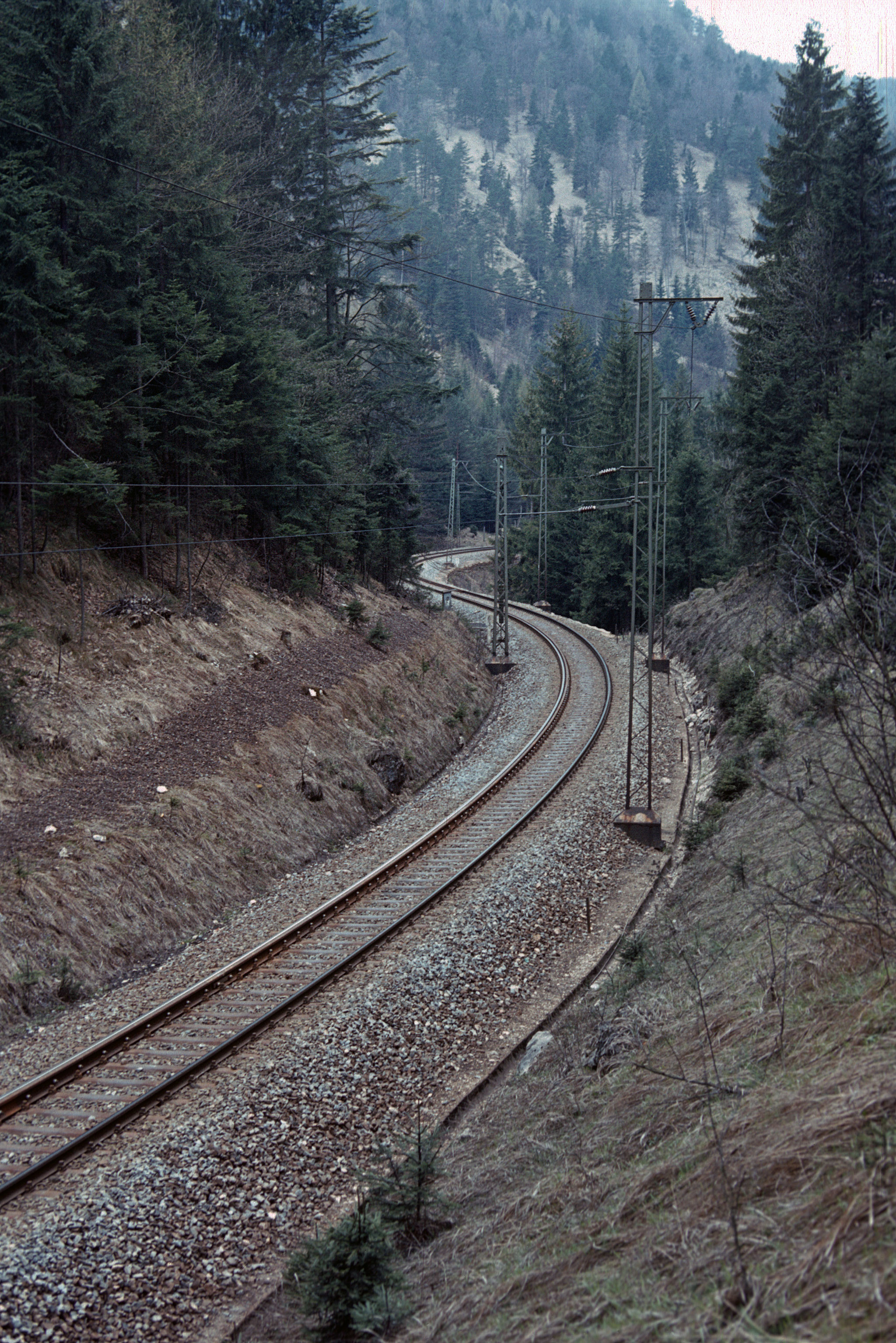
- A section of the railway between Bayrisch Gmain and Hallthurm in 1979

Overview
- Line number: 5740 (Freilassing–Bad Reichenhall); 5741 (Bad Reichenhall–Berchtesgaden)
- Locale: Bavaria, Germany

Service
- Route number: 954

Technical
- Line length: 33.671 km (20.922 mi)
- Track gauge: 1,435 mm (4 ft 8 1/2 in) standard gauge
- Electrification: 15 kV/16.7 Hz AC overhead catenary
- Maximum incline: 4.08%

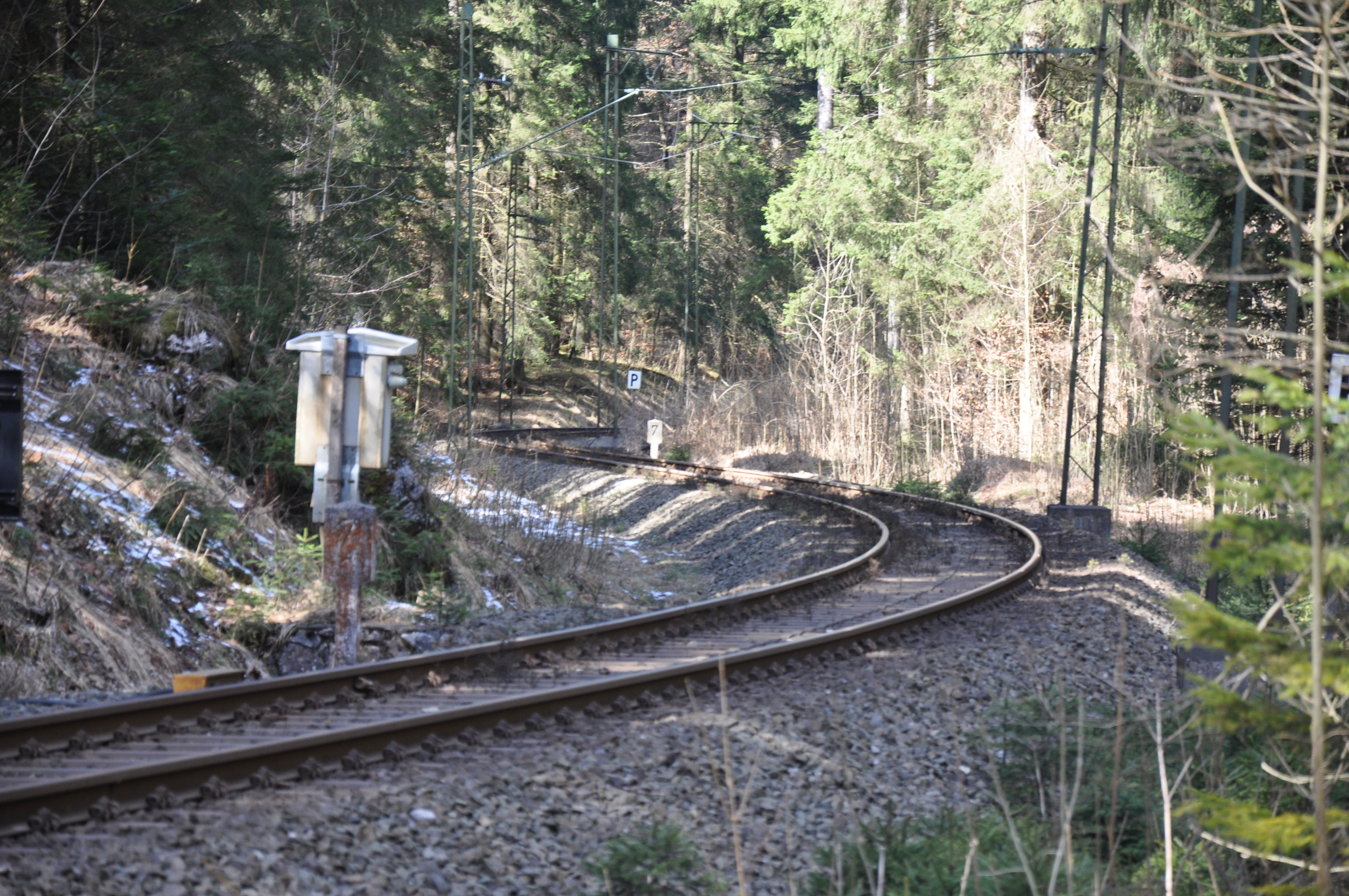
Steep section just before Hallthurm

The Freilassing–Berchtesgaden railway is an electrified line listed in the Deutsche Bahn timetable as route 954. The 33.671 km long route branches in Freilassing as a single-track line from the double-track Rosenheim–Salzburg railway. It is classified as a line as far as Bad Reichenhall and from there as branch line. The section between Bad Reichenhall-Kirchberg and Hallthurm is considered a steep section with specific operational requirements under Deutsche Bahn's regulations.

== History and former sidings ==
The Freilassing–Bad Reichenhall section was opened in 1866. In 1867, a project for a railway from Reichenhall to Berchtesgaden was approved, with assistance from the Administration of the Bavarian mountains, iron works, and salt works (German: Administration der bayerischen Berg-, Hütten- und Salzwerke). The construction of the Reichenhall–Berchtesgaden section was completed in 1884. On 25 October 1888 a festively decorated first train ran from Reichenhall to Berchtesgaden. The travel time for the entire route was initially 90 minutes and it was later reduced to 70 minutes. In 1914 the line was electrified. The AC power was supplied by the Saalach power station in Bad Reichenhall-Kirchberg, which is fed by lake Saalachsee and still supplies power for trains. The electric train operations started in 1916 with specially designed electric locomotives of class EP 3/6.

There used to be a 70-metre-long tunnel on a curve near the former Gmundbrücke station at Tristram Gorge. Its profile was too restrictive to allow the introduction of 4-axle carriages, so in 1933/34 it was opened out to form a cutting.

From 1909 to 1965 there was a connection at the end of the line at Berchtesgaden to the Königssee Railway to the lake of Königssee. Another connecting line existed from 1908 to 1938, the Berchtesgaden–Hangender Stein railway, also called the Grüne Elektrische (“Green Electric”). This line was connected in turn to the Salzburg–Hangender Stein railway, which was called the Rote Elektrische (“Red Electric”). During the Third Reich, this rail link was closed as part of the planned duplication of the railway and the upgrading of the main road. Since then buses have run, which are dubbed the Watzmann Express. Work on the railway upgrade was begun but, due to the war, it was never completed. Even today, a tunnel without tracks near Berchtesgaden station is a reminder of that unfinished railway project.

=== Rolling stock ===
The line commenced operations using Bavarian branch line locomotives of class D VIII. Even Glaskasten (“glass box”) locomotives were occasionally seen on the line. After electrification the line was operated with electric traction. Initially, class E 36 01-04 and 21-24 E 36 locomotives were used for mixed traffic. In freight transport, and shunting operations to Hallthurm yard class 21-22 E 70 and E 79 01-02 locomotives were used. After experiments with single axle electric locomotives (class E 73 01–02), eight electric locomotives of Deutsche Reichsbahn class E 44.5 (numbered as 144502-509 under Deutsche Bundesbahn) provided the majority of traction on this route for half a century (1930s to their retirement in 1983). The machines were located in Freilassing depot. Locomotive no 144 502, the original member of the locomotive class, is set up as a memorial at Freilassing station. No 144 508 is located in the Freilassing Locomotive World museum. In addition, even no 144 507 has been preserved and is kept in the former Weimar locomotive depot by Thüringer Eisenbahnfreunde ("Thuringian railway friends"). Locomotives of various classes were used for shunting to the Hallthurm depot.

== Long distance services ==
An Intercity pair of trains (2082/2083), the Königssee runs from Hamburg to Berchtesgaden and back once a day, providing a direct connection between several German cities and the holiday resorts in the Berchtesgaden area. Since the Intercity sets terminate each night in Freilassing for logistical reasons, each morning the Intercity sets return from Freilassing to Berchtesgaden and then run from there to Hamburg. In the afternoons, the procedure is similar, that is the services coming from Hamburg immediately return to Freilassing after their arrival.

These four train movements each day replace regular services of the Berchtesgadener Land Bahn (BLB). Therefore, passengers with tickets for local services can use these services as if they are Regional-Express services. Traction for these services is provided by ÖBB locomotives of class 1016/1116. As the trains running from Freilassing to Berchtesgaden and return run as Regionalbahn services, the train is operated and staffed by DB Regio.

Another Intercity service to Berchtesgaden, the pair of trains (2428/2429) from the Ruhr, was, however, withdrawn at the timetable change in December 2007. This service also ran between Freilassing and Berchtesgaden in both directions as a regional train.

== Local services ==
=== Salzburg S-Bahn ===
Since 2006, the line has been part of the Salzburg S-Bahn network and is integrated as line S 3 (Salzburg Central Station (Hauptbahnhof) or Golling–Abtenau to Bad Reichenhall) and the superimposed line S 4 (Freilassing–Berchtesgaden) service initially ran every hour. In the city of Salzburg there are now additional stops apart from the Hauptbahnhof. From June 2006 to December 2009, these services used as rolling stock ÖBB class 4023 and 4024 (Bombardier Talent) three carriage electrical multiple units. From the timetable change of 2009, the Talents operate only on line S 3 between Salzburg and Bad Reichenhall. On the Bavarian part of the S-Bahn line, the trains are operated by German personnel.

=== Berchtesgadener Land Bahn (BLB) ===
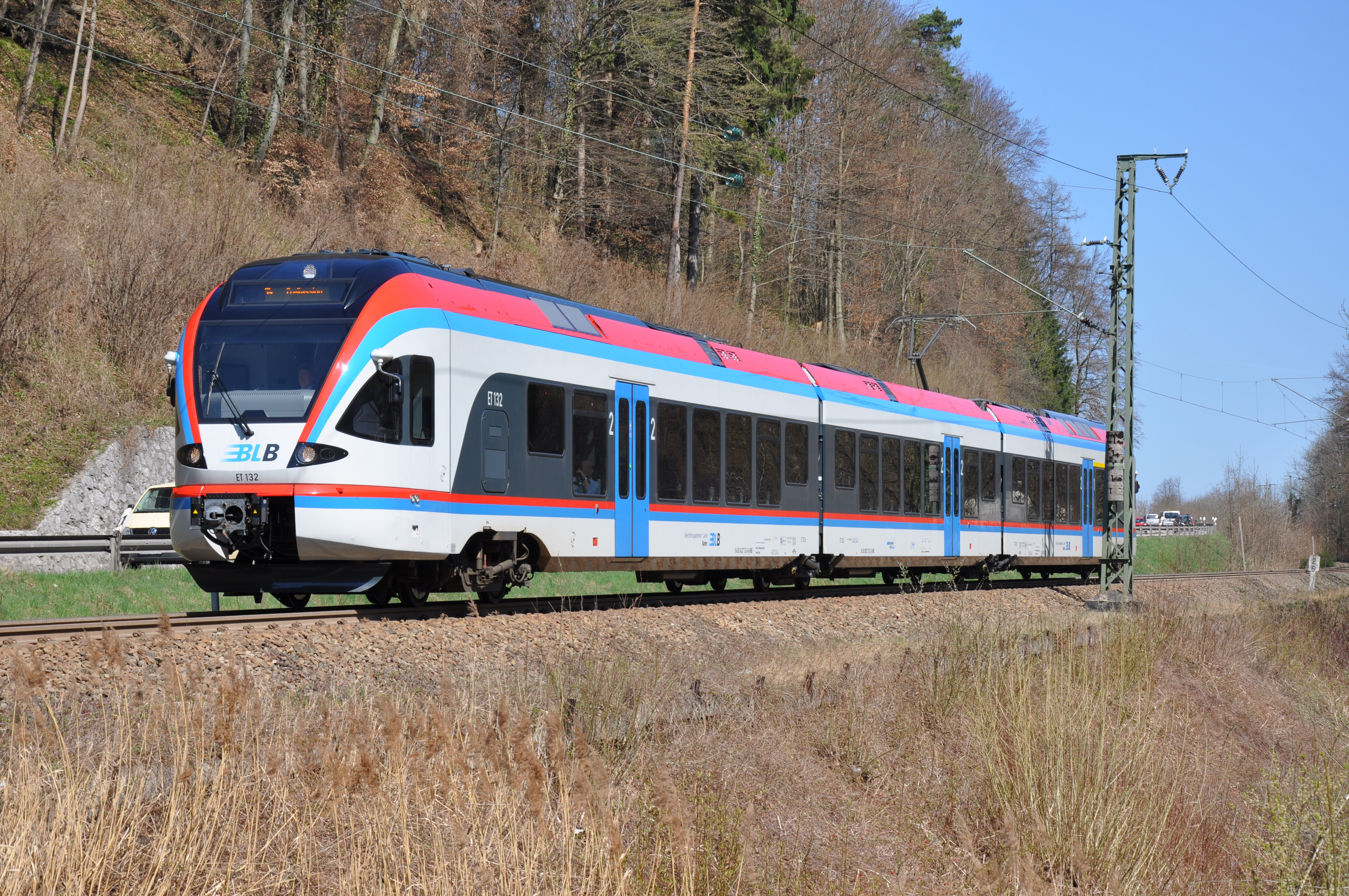
A BLB EMU between Bayerisch Gmain and Bad Reichenhall-Kirchberg

Tenders were called for Regionalbahn services in the summer of 2006, which was won by a consortium consisting of Regentalbahn and Salzburg AG (a utility company largely owned by the state of Salzburg and the city of Salzburg) in October 2006. Operations are carried out under the brand name of Berchtesgadener Land Bahn (“Berchtesgadener Land Railway”, officially Berchtesgadener LandBahn GmbH, BLB, which was founded as a company on 4 May 2009) and commenced at the timetable change on 13 December 2009. Originally, it was intended that services would be operated from the start of the line by five three-carriage Stadler FLIRT railcars leased from Angel Trains Europa (now called Alpha Trains, but operations were delayed until 24 and 25 February 2010, by a delay in the approval of the new railcars for the movement of passengers by the Federal Railway Authority (Eisenbahn-Bundesamt, EBA). Because BLB did not have its own rolling stock at first, services between Freilassing and Bad Reichenhall were operated using various borrowed replacement rail vehicles and a temporary replacement bus services was provided between Bad Reichenhall and Berchtesgaden. Berchtesgaden was again served by rail from 23 January 2010. Following the granting of approvals by the EBA, services with FLIRT sets commenced on 24 and 25 February 2010. But on the following night of 26 February 2010, four parked FLIRT sets were damaged by vandalism in Freilassing and Berchtesgaden stations so badly that at first replacement rolling stock had to be used. The FLIRT trains have operated on the line since 1 March 2010 and some services have continued across the border to Golling–Abtenau since 12 April 2010.

== Freight ==
The only freight worth mentioning runs between Freilassing and Hammerau. The bulk of the volume of freight are semi-finished steel products from the Annahütte steel works in Hammerau and containers of household waste that are collected in the district and loaded on container wagons, bound for the Freilassing-Hofham waste transfer station and onward transportation for incineration in Burgkirchen an der Alz. At the stations in Bad Reichenhall and Berchtesgaden there are tracks serving loading and unloading ramps, which are used for the shipment by rail of military vehicles of the Bundeswehr to and from locations in Bad Reichenhall and Strub (in Bischofswiesen). The Neuen Saline siding in Bad Reichenhall is no longer used.
