= DRG Class E 79 =

DR Class E 79
Type and origin
- Builder: J. A. Maffei; Pöge Elektrizitäts AG (electr. components)
- Build date: 1923
- Total produced: 2
Specifications
- Gauge: 1,435 mm (4 ft 8 1/2 in)
- Electric system/s: 15 kV 16 2/3 Hz AC
- Current pickup(s): catenary
Performance figures
- Maximum speed: 65 km/h
- Power output
  - Continuous: 1,480 kW
Career
- Numbers: E 79 01–02
- Retired: 1939/40

The DRG Class E 79 (originally ordered as Bavarian Class EG 4) was one of the goods train electric locomotive classes procured by the Bavarian Group Administration of the Deutsche Reichsbahn for the line from Freilassing to Berchtesgaden. The two engines, delivered in 1927, were scrapped however as early as the start of the Second World War.

== History ==
After the First World War the volume transported on the line from Freilassing to Berchtesgaden rose sharply. As a result, the Bavarian Group Administration ordered two more locomotives in 1923. The two engines were built by the firm of J. A. Maffei in Munich, whilst the electrical components came from Pöge Elektrizitäts AG in Chemnitz. Originally the engines were to have entered service as nos. EG 4 22 101 and 22 102, but due to problems with the delivery of the electrical components the locomotives were not ready until 1927. As a result, they were given the numbers E 79 01 and 02 by the Deutsche Reichsbahn based on their renumbering plan.

The two locomotives were station in Bw Freilassing. They did not perform particularly well in service; no. E 79 01 being especially prone to damage. Another problem was the procurement of spares for the small number of units in this class. As a result, both locomotives were quickly retired, in 1939 and 1940 respectively.

== Literature ==
- Bäzold, Dieter; Fiebig, Günther (1984). Eisenbahn-Fahrzeug-Archiv 4: Elektrische Lokomotiven deutscher Eisenbahnen (1st ed.). Düsseldorf: Alba-Verlag. ISBN 3-87094-093-X. And the 5th edition (1984), Berlin: Transpress Verlag.
