= Košín =

- Municipality
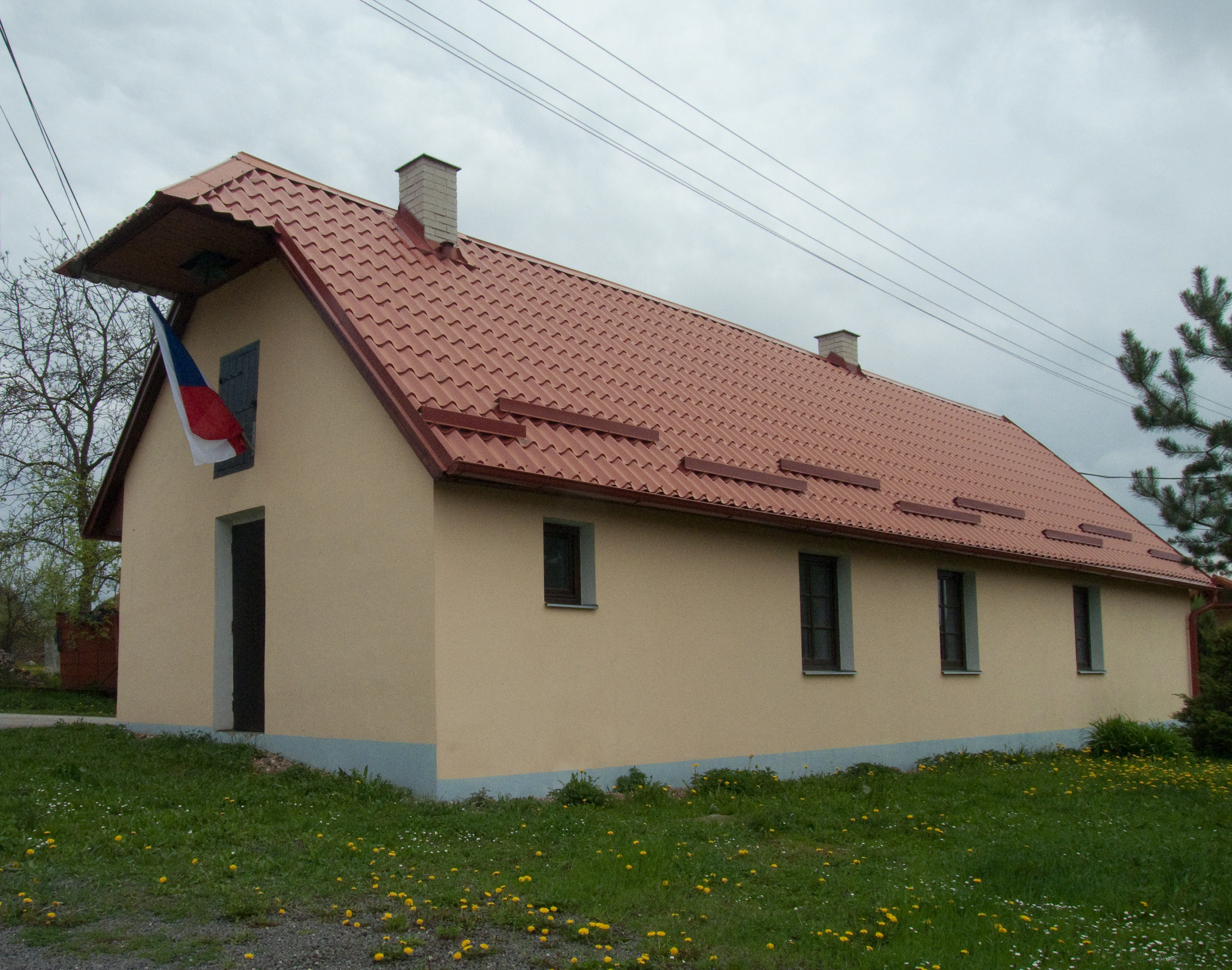
- Municipal office

- Location in the Czech Republic
- Coordinates: 49°27′23″N 14°39′31″E
- Country: Czech Republic
- Region: South Bohemian
- District: Tábor
- First mentioned: 1379

Area
  - Total: 1.92 km^{2} (0.74 sq mi)
- Elevation: 460 m (1,510 ft)

Population (2026-01-01)
  - Total: 107
  - Density: 55.7/km^{2} (144/sq mi)
- Time zone: UTC+1 (CET)
  - Summer (DST): UTC+2 (CEST)
- Postal code: 391 37
- Website: www.obeckosin.cz

Košín is a municipality and village in Tábor District in the South Bohemian Region of the Czech Republic. It has about 100 inhabitants.

Košín lies approximately 5 kilometres (3 mi) north of Tábor, 56 km (35 mi) north of České Budějovice, and 73 km (45 mi) south of Prague.

== Demographics ==
Historical population
Year	Pop.	±%
1869	157	—
1880	141	−10.2%
1890	156	+10.6%
1900	172	+10.3%
1910	151	−12.2%
1921	163	+7.9%
1930	191	+17.2%
1950	150	−21.5%
1961	127	−15.3%
1970	97	−23.6%
1980	82	−15.5%
1991	61	−25.6%
2001	65	+6.6%
2011	74	+13.8%
2021	90	+21.6%
Source: Censuses
