= Teisnach =

- Municipality
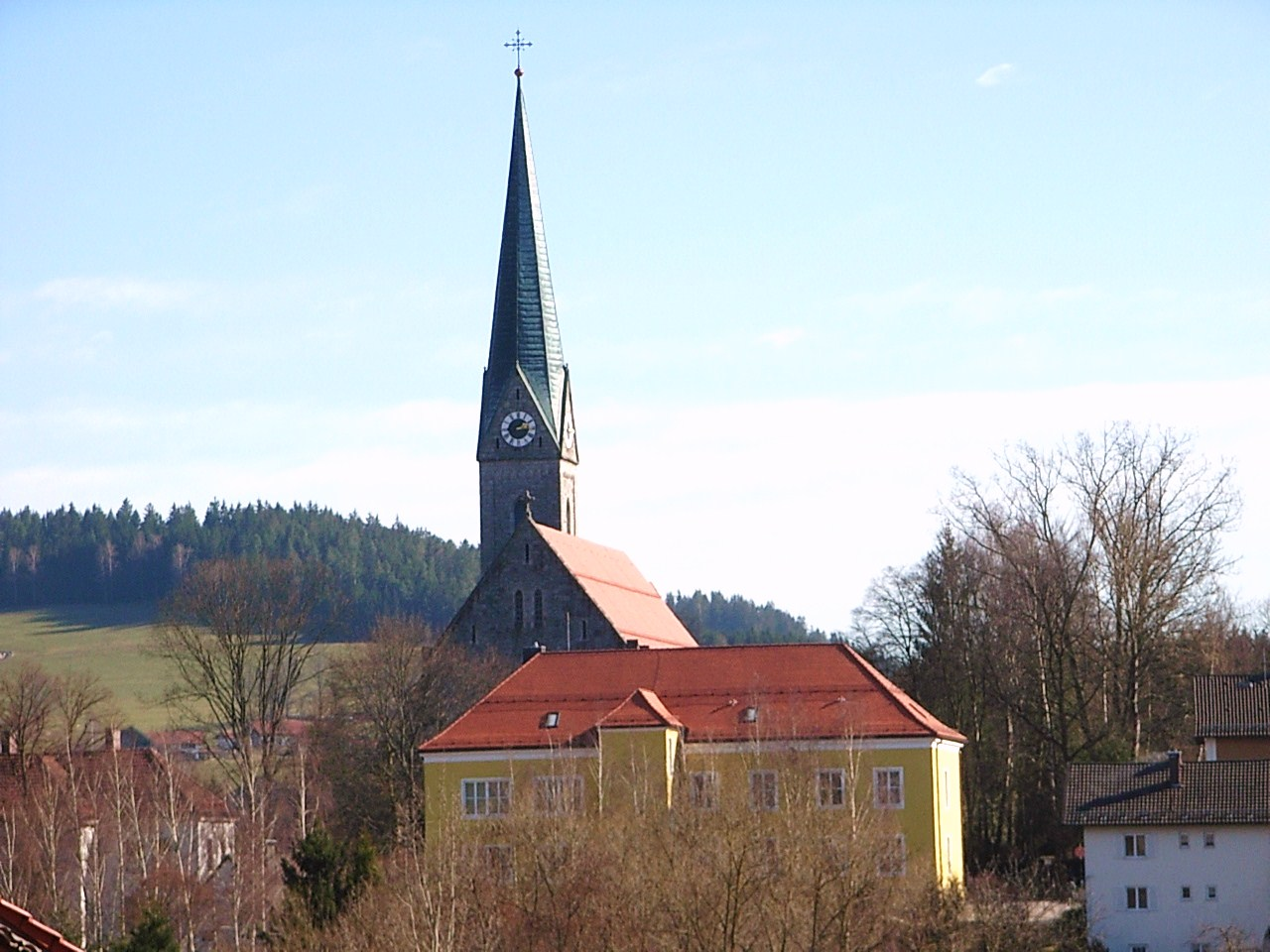
- Saint Margaret Church and the Town Hall

- Coat of arms

- Location of Teisnach within Regen district
- Interactive map of Teisnach
- Location within Germany Location within Bavaria
- Coordinates: 49°2′N 13°0′E
- Country: Germany
- State: Bavaria
- Admin. region: Niederbayern
- District: Regen

Government
  - Mayor (2023–29): Daniel Graßl (SPD)

Area
  - Total: 25.77 km^{2} (9.95 sq mi)
- Elevation: 440–700 m (1,440–2,300 ft)

Population (2025-12-31)
  - Total: 2,956
  - Density: 114.7/km^{2} (297.1/sq mi)
- Time zone: UTC+01:00 (CET)
  - Summer (DST): UTC+02:00 (CEST)
- Postal codes: 94244
- Dialling codes: 09923
- Vehicle registration: REG
- Website: teisnach.de

Teisnach (German pronunciation: [ˈtaɪsnax]; Northern Bavarian: Deisna) is a larger municipality in the district of Regen in Bavaria in Germany.

== Geography ==
Teisnach is situated in the Bavarian Forest region in Lower Bavaria. The municipality lies on the estuary of the river Teisnach into the Schwarzer Regen (river) about 25 kilometers north of Deggendorf and around 170 kilometers northeast of the Bavarian capital Munich.

== History ==
The village of Teisnach was first mentioned in an official document in the year 1367 as a small fishing village. In 1818, today's municipality formed out of the merging with Teisnach and the nearby municipalities of Kaikenried and Sohl. By the late 19th century, the once small village developed into an industrial hub within the region when a paper factory was opened on the shore of the Schwarzer Regen. This led to a growth in population and the construction of the Teisnach church in 1900. In 1890, Teisnach was linked to the railway network with the opening of the Gotteszell-Blaibach railway. In 1969, the Rohde & Schwarz company opened a manufacturing plant in Teisnach which expanded into one of the largest employers in the region, employing nearly 2000 workers. Since 2009, Teisnach hosts a branch of the Technische Hochschule Deggendorf, where the world's largest machine for producing space telescope mirrors is situated.

=== Population History ===
Between 1988 and 2018 the population of the town grew from 2686 to 2950 to 264 inhabitants i.e. by ca. 10%, which was the highest growth rate in the region in this time.

- Year: Population
- 1961: 2565
- 1970: 2573
- 1987: 2641
- 1991: 2784
- 1995: 2912
- 2000: 2994
- 2005: 2955
- 2010: 2894
- 2015: 2879

== Politics ==
The current mayor of Teisnach is Daniel Graßl (SPD), having taken office in 2018. His predecessor, Rita Röhrl who was mayor since 1990, left office after she was elected head of the Regen district. The current parish council consists of 14 members, 6 from the Cristian-Social Christlich Soziale Union, 5 members from the Social-Democratic SPD, 2 further members from the Free Voters and one Independent.
