= Barbora Markéta Eliášová =

Czech writer

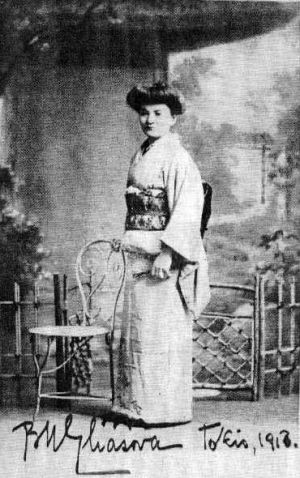
- Eliášová wearing a kimono in 1913
- Born: 2 November 1874; Jiříkovice, Moravia, Austria-Hungary
- Died: 27 April 1957 (aged 82); Prague, Czechoslovakia
- Occupations: Writer, traveller, educator

Barbora Markéta Eliášová (2 November 1874 – 27 April 1957) was a Czech writer, traveller, translator, art collector and educator. She is considered "the first Czech solo woman traveller", and she wrote several books about her times in Japan.

== Early life and education ==
Eliášová was born in Jiříkovice, the daughter of Apolena Eliášová; she was orphaned in childhood, and working in a textile factory at age 14.

== Career ==
Eliášová worked for a German actress in Vienna, and at a flooring company in Prague. She travelled and worked on her language skills to expand her employment opportunities. In 1904, she began teaching English in Prague.

Eliášová travelled to Japan in 1912, after her fiancé and another close friend died, and worked as a governess for an English family in Nagano Prefecture, taught classes, and studied Japanese language and traditional arts including ikebana, bonsai, tea ceremonies, and dyeing techniques. She returned to Europe via North America, and in 1915 published her travel memoir, A Year of Life Among the Japanese and Around the Globe. She returned to Japan in 1920, as a lecturer and diplomat, and worked at the Czech embassy in Tokyo. She wrote another travel memoir from this trip.

She travelled to Japan again in 1923, and arrived just before the Great Kantō Earthquake that year. She survived, but her notebooks, camera, passport and other possessions were lost, and she walked three days from Yokohama to Kobe in the aftermath. On her way back to Europe, she crossed North America again, and survived a trainwreck near Chicago. A third book, In Japan in Times of Good and Bad, followed this series of ordeals.

She travelled again in 1925 and 1926, visiting Singapore, Java, Bali, and Australia, before returning via Capetown and the Canary Islands. She wrote about this journey in her fourth travel memoir, A Year in the Southern Hemisphere. She travelled to Japan, Korea, China, and the Soviet Union in 1929, and published a book about Japanese women that year. She published a book of Japanese fairy tales in 1943, and a Japan-themed novel, Hanako (1944). She also translated Japanese literature, and distributed anti-German leaflets during World War II.

== Publications ==
- One Year in Japan and Around the Globe (1915, Rok života mezi Japonci a kolem zeměkoule, also known as A Year of Life Among the Japanese and Around the Globe)
- In Japan in Times of Good and Bad (1924, V Japonsku: v dobách dobrých i zlých)
- A Year in the Southern Hemisphere: Java, Australia, Africa (1928, Rok na jižní polokouli: Jáva. Australie. Afrika)
- Japanese Women of Today (1929, also known as Daughters of Japan)

== Late life and legacy ==
Eliášová used a wheelchair in her last years, and was in the care of her former student, Eugenia Plihalová. She died in 1957, at the age of 82, in Pankrác, Prague. A memorial plaque was placed in her hometown in 2003, and in 2009, a portrait of her wearing a kimono was featured on Czech postage. In 2019, another plaque in her memory was placed at the Aoyama Villa in Roztoky. Some of her photographs and her collection of Asian art and objects are in the Náprstek Museum. The Moravian Library in Brno held an exhibit about Eliášová in 2019 and 2020.
