= Gotteszell =

- Municipality
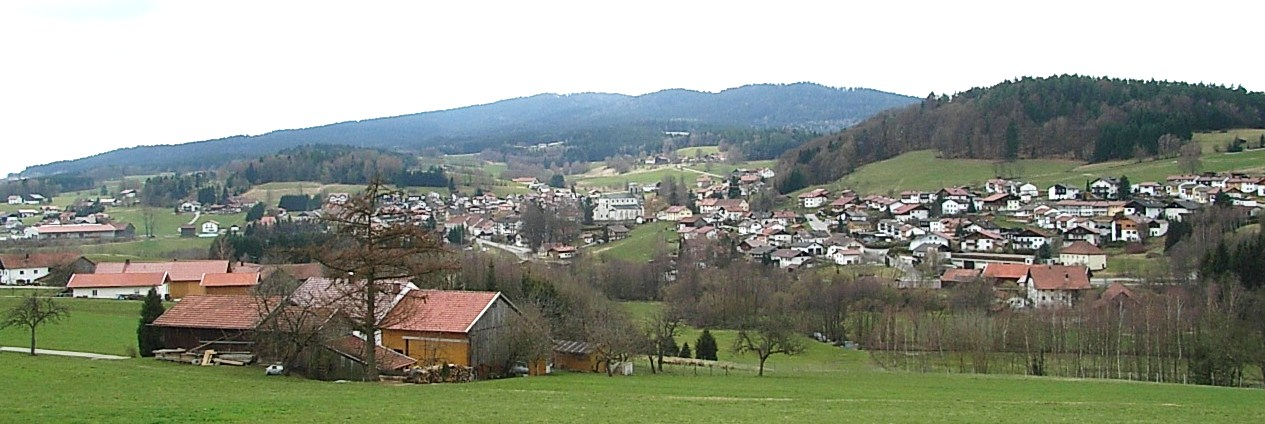
- General view of Gotteszell from north-east

- Coat of arms

- Location of Gotteszell within Regen district
- Interactive map of Gotteszell
- Location within Germany Location within Bavaria
- Coordinates: 48°58′N 12°58′E
- Country: Germany
- State: Bavaria
- Admin. region: Niederbayern
- District: Regen
- Municipal assoc.: Ruhmannsfelden

Government
  - Mayor (2020–26): Georg Fleischmann (CSU)

Area
  - Total: 9.22 km^{2} (3.56 sq mi)
- Elevation: 510 m (1,670 ft)

Population (2025-12-31)
  - Total: 1,139
  - Density: 124/km^{2} (320/sq mi)
- Time zone: UTC+01:00 (CET)
  - Summer (DST): UTC+02:00 (CEST)
- Postal codes: 94239
- Dialling codes: 09929
- Vehicle registration: REG
- Website: www.gotteszell.de

Gotteszell (German pronunciation: [ˈɡɔtəsˌtsɛl]) is a municipality in the district of Regen in Bavaria in Germany.

== See also ==
- Gotteszell–Blaibach railway
