= Deggendorf–Metten railway =

Rail line in Germany

Deggendorf–Metten

Overview
- Line number: 9582 (Germany)

Service
- Route number: 426b 1957

Technical
- Line length: 4.22 km (2.62 mi)
- Track gauge: 1,435 mm (4 ft 8 1/2 in)

The Deggendorf—Metten railway was a local Bavarian branch line (Lokalbahn) in southern Germany. It was established by the Aktiengesellschaft der Lokalbahn Deggendorf-Metten, a railway company in eastern Bavarian that built and operated this standard gauge line between the two towns.

The company was founded, on the one hand, to provide a railway link to the town of Metten, well known for its monastery (Kloster Metten) and, on the other hand, to export stone from the granite quarries in the surrounding area.

The concession was issued on 7 September 1890. That same year construction started and, on 17 October 1891, it was opened to traffic. The length of the Paterbahn, as it was called in the local dialect, was 4.22 kilometres. In addition, in Metten there was a 1.1 kilometre long branch to the quarries. The two steam locomotives that worked the line were called Deggendorf (Krauss 1891/ 2451 - B n2t - 1,435 mm, scrapped in 1965) and Metten (Krauss 1891/ 2452 - B n2t - 1,435 mm, scrapped in 1953).

The line was taken over on 1 February 1928 by the Regentalbahn AG who continued to operate it. They worked it with their locomotive Osser (Maffei 1922/ 5478 - C h2t - 1,435 mm) as well as the 'new' Deggendorf (Maffei 1927/ 5684 - D h2t - 1,435 mm).

On 6 November 1975 the last steam train ran down the line. On 23 September 1983 the last passenger train was underway. Goods traffic ceased in 1991 and on 1 August 1993 the line was finally closed.

== See also ==
- List of closed railway lines in Bavaria
- Bavarian branch lines
- Regentalbahn
