= Regentalbahn =

German internationally operating private railway operator from Viechtach, Germany

Logo of Länderbahn

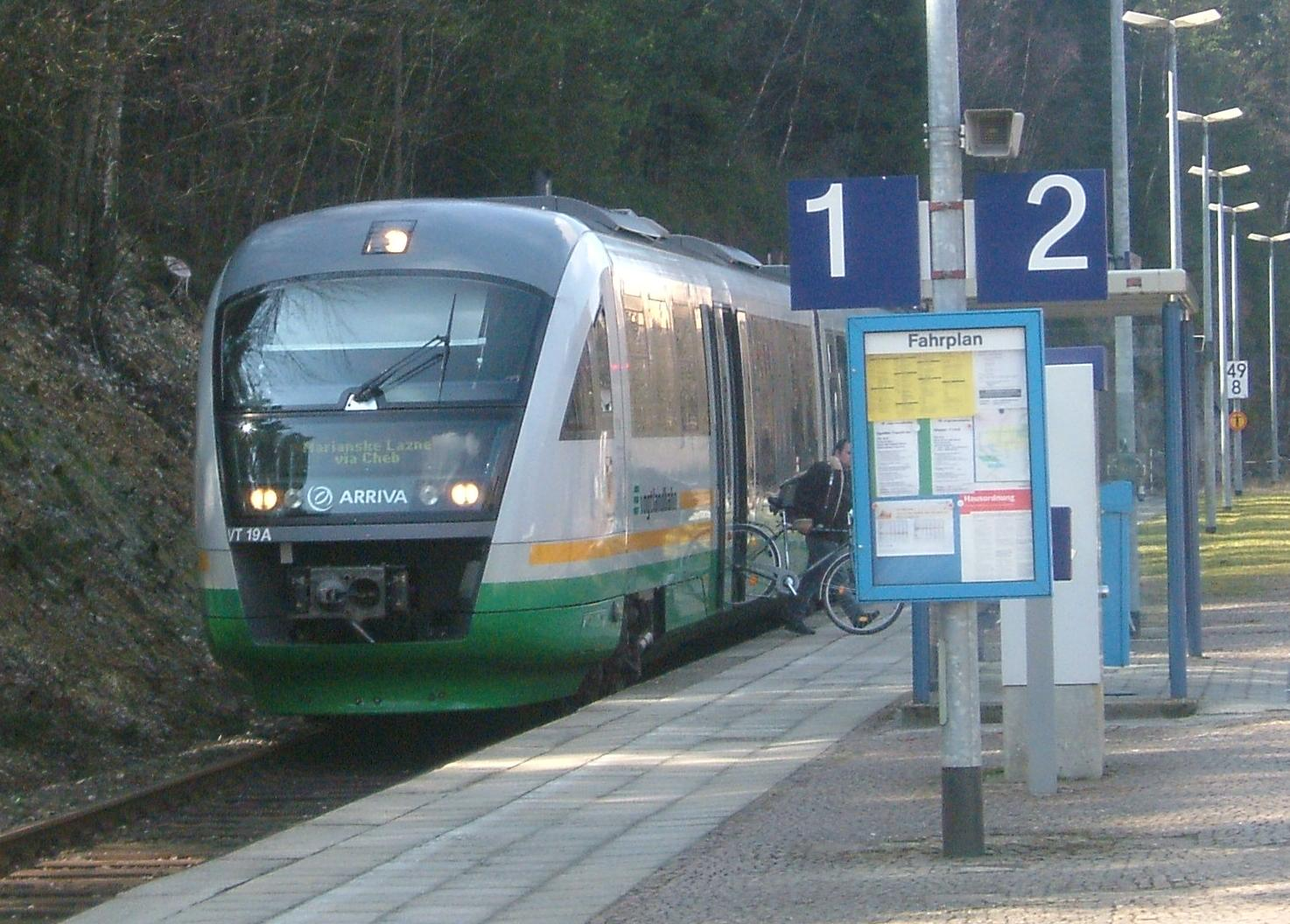
Siemens Desiro, VT19a, at Bad Brambach

The Regentalbahn (Regentalbahn AG – Die Länderbahn) is a railway company based in Bavaria, and is owned by Ferrovie dello Stato and the Luxembourg infrastructure fund Cube, through the German holding company of Netinera. It runs railway infrastructure, as well as regional and long-distance passenger services in Bavaria and Saxony with links into the Czech Republic, and Germany-wide goods trains.

The subsidiary Regental Bahnbetriebs-GmbH (RBG) operates goods trains though its subsidiary Regental Cargo, and passenger trains through Die Länderbahn, whilst Regental Fahrzeugwerkstätten operates railway workshops. A fourth subsidiary Regental Kraftverkehrs, a bus operator, ceased operations in 2004.

== Emergence of the Regentalbahn AG (RAG) ==
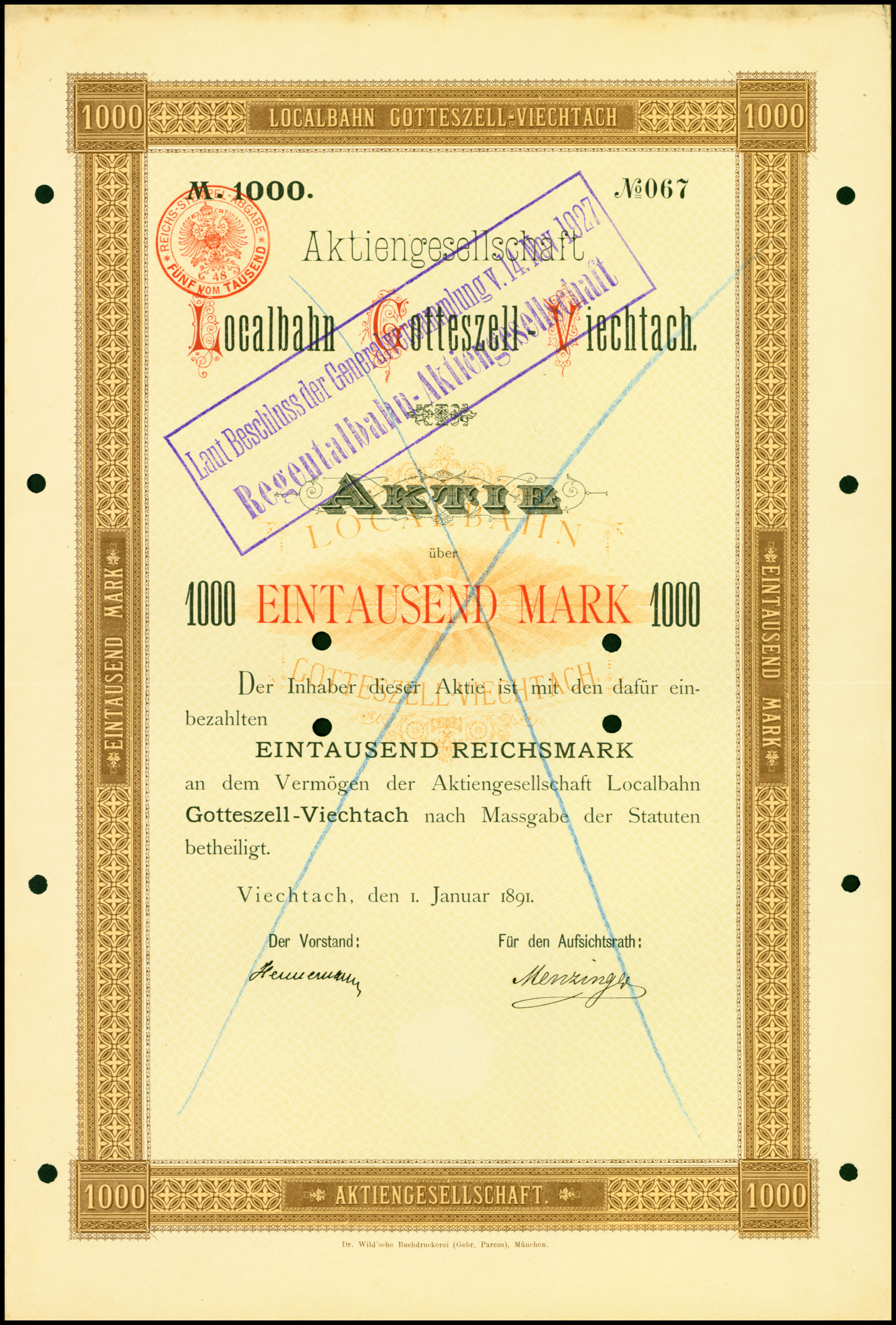
Share of the AG Localbahn Gotteszell-Viechtach, issued 1. January 1891

On 9 May 1889 the "AG Localbahn Gotteszell - Viechtach" railway company sprang to life as a result of a "concession for the construction and operation of a standard gauge railway from Gotteszell to Viechtach" dated 28 April 1889. Lokalbahn was the name for a local branch line in Bavaria.

On 10 November 1890 goods trains were already running from Gotteszell to Teisnach and on 20 November 1890 full services to Viechtach began. The company acquired in 1903 the granite factory of Teisnach AG and the Prünst quarry, that still provides ballast for track construction today. On 1 January 1928 the Lokalbahn Deggendorf-Metten AG was also acquired and merged with the Gotteszell – Viechtach Lokalbahn company which was now called the Regentalbahn AG. In 1924/25 construction of the line from Viechtach to Blaibach was begun. Goods services started here on 2 January 1928 and passenger trains on 1 February 1928. On 1 January 1973 the Regentalbahn AG also took over the eighty-year-old AG Lokalbahn Lam - Kötzting.

== Founding of the subsidiaries ==
The period since the 1970s has been marked by modernisation and rationalisation. A large number of railcars were procured (initially second-hand, but since the 1980s new ones as well) and various parts of the business split into subsidiaries. In 2002 the Regentalbahn acquired the trade name Die Länderbahn ("The State Railway"), with which it is clear that it is active in Bavaria, Saxony, Thuringia and the Czech Republic.

In 1980 the Prünst granite works became a limited company (GmbH), in which the Regentalbahn had a 50% stake. This share was sold in 2005.

At the same time the following 100%-owned subsidiaries were created within the Regentalbahn AG:

- In 1979 the Regental Kraftverkehrs GmbH (RKG) - bus operations
- In 1988 the Regental Bahnbetriebs-GmbH (RBG) - railway operations
- In 1989 the Regental Fahrzeugwerkstätten GmbH (RFG) - workshops
- In 1998 the Vogtlandbahn GmbH (VBG) - Vogtland railway
- in 2012 the vlexx GmbH

On 1 January 2004 the Regentalbahn Kraftverkehrs was disbanded for economic reasons. The vehicles and personnel were taken over by the bus company Regionalbus Ostbayern, that continues to run bus services Viechtach and Lam.

Since 1997 Regental Bahnbetriebs has operated all the lines of the Bavarian Forest railway under contract to the Deutsche Bahn (DB Regio Bayern). Under this contract it has run since 2001 under the trade name Oberpfalzbahn not only its own route from Bad Kötzting to Lam, but also the Schwandorf–Cham–Furth im Wald, Cham–Waldmünchen and Cham–Bad Kötzting lines. In addition, the goods traffic branch Regental Cargo also belongs to the Regental Bahnbetriebs-GmbH. Regental Cargo runs goods trains countrywide, has its centre of operations at Neuenmarkt-Wirsberg (with a satellite depot at Zwickau) and is part of the goods wagon network Eccocargo.

The Vogtlandbahn, founded on 1 January 1998, took over Regentalbahn's operations in Saxony. Since 2005 it offers its own Vogtland Express, a long-distance train, that links the Vogtland with Berlin daily. Since 2007 it operates the ALEX (see below).

The Regental Fahrzeugwerkstätten runs two workshops for all the railways of the Länderbahn. One is at the headquarters in Viechtach in the Bavarian Forest, the other at Neumark im Vogtland. Since 2006 there has been a third workshop at Schwandorf, especially for the Oberpfalzbahn and future tasks of the Länderbahn for the maintenance of the Oberpfalzbahn shuttle and the locomotives and wagons of the ALEX.

In December 2003, the Allgäu Express (ALEX) started working between Munich and Oberstdorf as a substitute for the withdrawn Interregio-Linie 25. This was done in cooperation with EuroThurbo (since early 2005 SBB). When the Regentalbahn won the competition in December 2005 for the next, longer contract period, it became responsible from the timetable change in December 2007 for long-distance services not just on the line from Munich to Oberstdorf, together with a new train portion to Lindau, but also the Munich–Regensburg–Hof and Munich–Regensburg–Furth im Wald-Prague routes. Negotiations over an extension via Hof to Leipzig and Berlin continue. The trade mark ALEX was retained, but will mean from now on Arriva Länderbahn Express; services on the Vogtlandbahn will be phased out. Following the takeover by FS in 2010 it has now been rebranded simply as alex.

Following the advertisement published in summer 2006 for Regionalbahn services on the Freilassing–Berchtesgaden railway, the contract went in October of the same year to the Berchtesgadener Bahn, a consortium of the Regentalbahn and the Salzburg AG who, as the winners will take over these services after the timetable change in December 2009.

The Regentalbahn is a member of the Tarifverband der Bundeseigenen und Nichtbundeseigenen Eisenbahnen in Deutschland (TBNE).

Since December 2015, the subsidiaries of the Regentalbahn have been operating under the umbrella of Länderbahn GmbH DLB, a 100% owned subsidiary of Regentalbahn. Thus Regentalbahn-Bahnbetriebs GmbH, Vogtlandbahn GmbH, Regental Fahrzeugwerkstätten GmbH and vlexx are under one roof.

== New ownership arrangements ==
The shares of the Regentalbahn were split between numerous owners. In 1940 these included the Deutsche Reich, the state of Bavaria, the Bayerische Landesbank and the Deutsche Reichsbahn. By 1982 the Free State of Bavaria had gained 76,9% of the shares. The rest were divided between towns and villages, the Benedictine abbey of Metten and private individuals. In autumn 2004 the Free State sold its share majority to the British transport company Arriva which has Europe-wide interests. Its German subsidiary Arriva Deutschland increased its share of the Regentalbahn to 100% by May 2006 through purchases. After Arriva was bought by Deutsche Bahn in 2010, the business had to be resold from competition reasons. The new owners are the Italian state railways (Ferrovie dello Stato) together with Luxembourg infrastructure fund Cube. The German parent company since March 2011 is called Netinera.

== See also ==
- Bavarian Forest railway

== Sources ==
- Andreas Fried, Klaus-Peter Quill: Regentalbahn - Egglham 1999
- Gerd Wolff: Deutsche Klein- und Privatbahnen - Band 7: Bayern - Freiburg 2002
