= Blaibach =

- Municipality
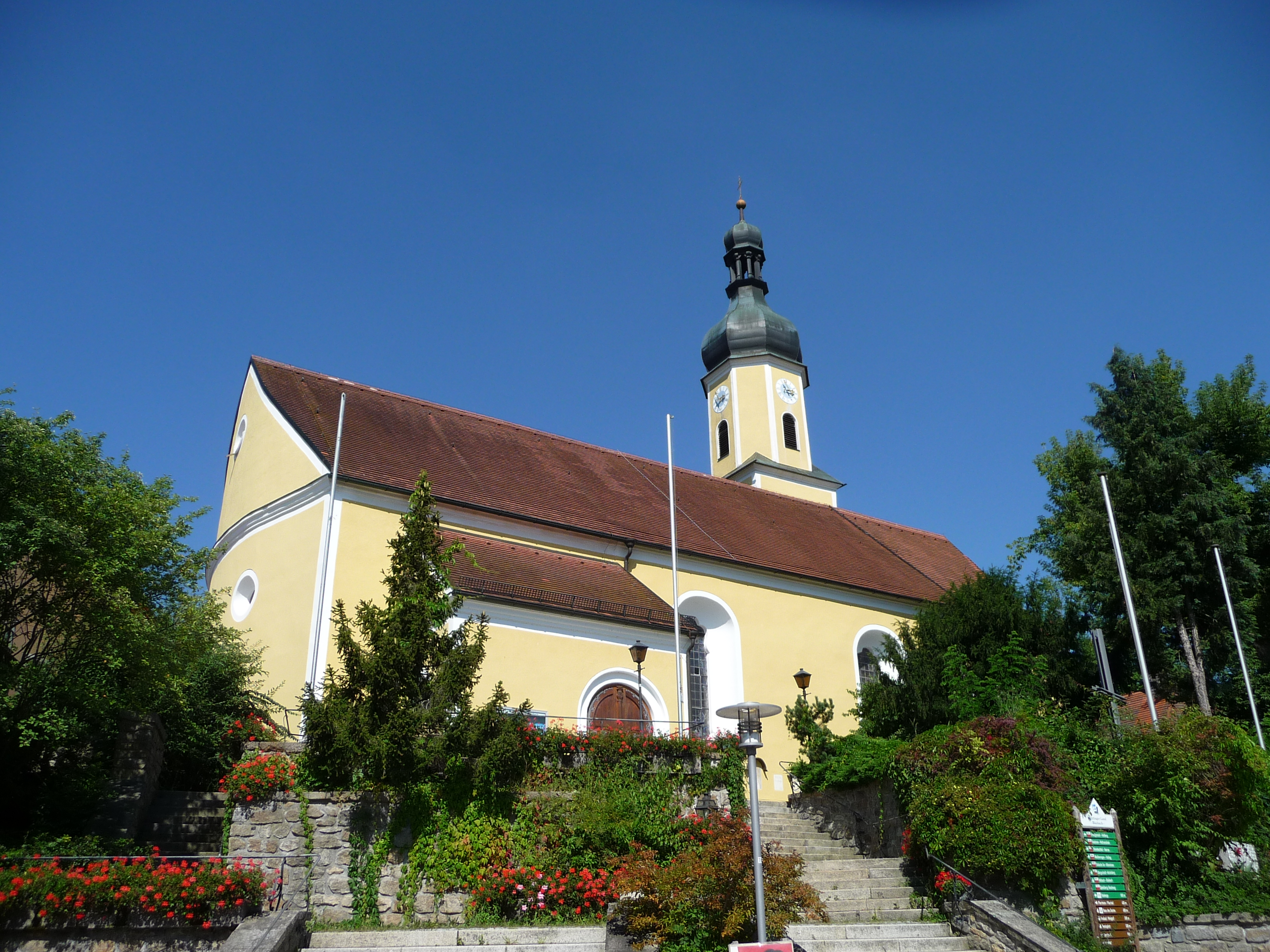
- Saint Elisabeth Church

- Coat of arms

- Location of Blaibach within Cham district
- Interactive map of Blaibach
- Location within Germany Location within Bavaria
- Coordinates: 49°10′N 12°49′E
- Country: Germany
- State: Bavaria
- Admin. region: Oberpfalz
- District: Cham

Government
  - Mayor (2022–28): Monika Bergmann

Area
  - Total: 17.02 km^{2} (6.57 sq mi)
- Elevation: 394 m (1,293 ft)

Population (2025-12-31)
  - Total: 1,895
  - Density: 111.3/km^{2} (288.4/sq mi)
- Time zone: UTC+01:00 (CET)
  - Summer (DST): UTC+02:00 (CEST)
- Postal codes: 93476
- Dialling codes: 0 99 41
- Vehicle registration: CHA
- Website: www.blaibach.de

Blaibach (German pronunciation: [ˈblaɪbax]; Northern Bavarian: Bloaba) is a municipality in the district of Cham in Bavaria in Germany.

== Mayors ==
The mayor is Monika Bergmann, elected in 2022. Previous mayors were Wolfgang Eckl (CSU/Freie Bürger), Ludwig Baumgartner (CSU/Freie Bürger) and Karl Trenner (CSU/Freie Bürger).

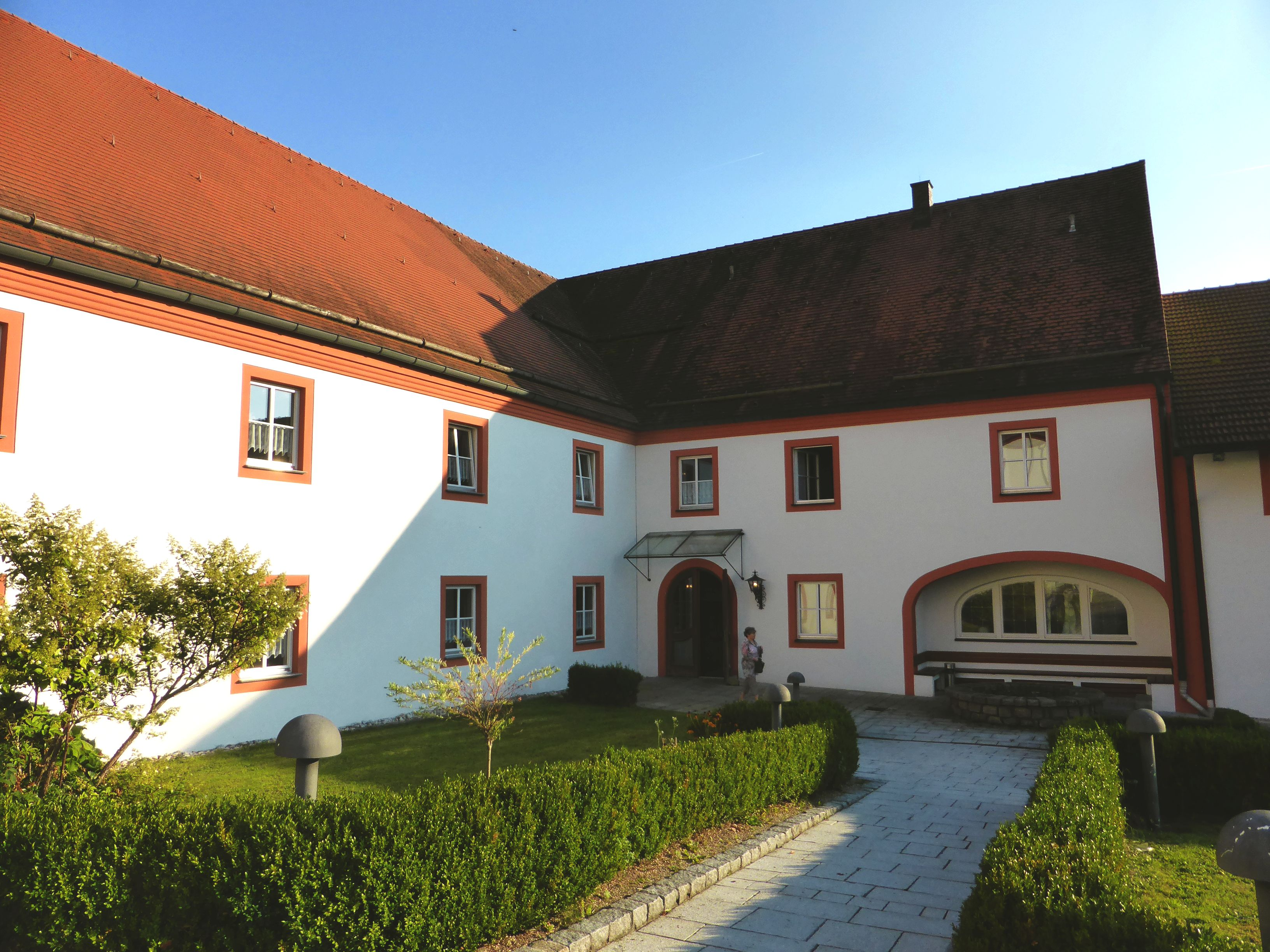
Blaibach castle (2016)

== See also ==
- Gotteszell–Blaibach railway
