= List of railway routes in Saxony =

The List of railway routes in Saxony provides a list of regional railway routes in Saxony, eastern Germany.

== Regional services ==
In 2023, the following regional services were operated by several operators:

Line	Route	Frequency (min)	Rolling stock	Operator
RE 1	Dresden – Dresden-Neustadt – Arnsdorf – Bischofswerda – Bautzen – Löbau – Görlitz (–Zgorzelec)	120	Siemens Desiro Classic (class 642)	Trilex, 11 train pairs to Zgorzelec under contract.
RE 1 (Thuringia)	Göttingen – Mühlhausen – Erfurt – Gera –Gößnitz – Glauchau	120	Class 612	DB Regio Südost
RB 1	Zwickau Zentrum – Zwickau – Falkenstein – Klingenthal – Kraslice	60	Stadler Regio-Shuttle RS 1 (class 650)	Vogtlandbahn
RE 2	Dresden – Dresden-Neustadt – Arnsdorf – Bischofswerda – Ebersbach – Zittau (– Liberec)	120; Mon–Fri: 2 train pairs to Liberec; Sat and Sun: 7 pairs to Liberec	Siemens Desiro Classic	Trilex
RB 2	Zwickau Zentrum – Zwickau – Werdau – Reichenbach – Plauen (Vogtl) ob Bf – Weischlitz – Adorf – Bad Brambach (– Cheb)	60 Zwickau Zentrum–Adorf; 120 Adorf–Bad Brambach; 5 train pairs to Cheb	Stadler Regio-Shuttle RS1	Vogtlandbahn
RE 3	Dresden – Freiberg – Chemnitz – Zwickau – Reichenbach – Plauen ob Bf – Hof	60	Alstom Coradia Continental (class 1440)	Mitteldeutsche Regiobahn
RB 4	Gera – Greiz – Elsterberg – Plauen Mitte – Weischlitz (– Adorf)	120 + some trainsGreiz–Weischlitz (Mon–Fri) and Weischlitz–Adorf (Sat–Sun)	Stadler Regio-Shuttle RS1	Vogtlandbahn
RB 5	Mehltheuer – Plauen ob Bf – Herlasgrün – Auerbach – Falkenstein – Zwotental – Klingenthal – Kraslice – Sokolov	60 Plauen–Falkenstein; 120 Mehltheuer–Plauen and Falkenstein–Sokolov	Stadler Regio-Shuttle RS1	Vogtlandbahn
RE 6	Leipzig – Bad Lausick – Geithain – Burgstädt – Chemnitz	60	Eurorunner (class 223) + corridor coaches	Mitteldeutsche Regiobahn
RB 10	Leipzig – Eilenburg – Torgau – Falkenberg – Doberlug-Kirchhain – Cottbus – Guben – Frankfurt (Oder)	120	Siemens Mireo (class BR 463)	DB Regio Nordost
RE 11	Leipzig – Eilenburg – Torgau – Falkenberg – Ruhland – Hoyerswerda	120	Siemens Mireo (class BR 463)	DB Regio Nordost
RE 12	Leipzig – Zeitz – Gera – Saalfeld	120	Stadler Regio-Shuttle RS1	Erfurter Bahn
RB 13	Gera – Zeulenroda – Mehltheuer – Hof	120	Stadler Regio-Shuttle RS1	Erfurter Bahn
RE 13	Leipzig – Delitzsch – Bitterfeld – Dessau – Magdeburg	60	Bombardier Talent 2 / Bombardier Traxx + 3 double-deck coaches	DB Regio Südost
RE 15	Dresden – Coswig – Großenhain – Ruhland – Hoyerswerda	120	Class 112 + double-deck coaches / Bombardier Talent 2	DB Regio Nordost
RB 18	Dresden – Coswig – Großenhain – Ruhland – Cottbus	120	Class 112 + double-deck coaches / Bombardier Talent 2	DB Regio Nordost
RE 19	Dresden – Heidenau – Kurort Altenberg	1 train pair runs on weekends and public holidays only	Siemens Desiro Classic	DB Regio Südost
RE 20	Dresden – Pirna – Bad Schandau – Děčín – Ústí nad Labem – Litoměřice	2 train pairs on weekends and public holidays in the summer	Siemens Desiro Classic, ČD class 371 + corridor coaches	DB Regio Südost
RB 20	Leipzig – Markranstädt – Weißenfels – Naumburg – Apolda – Weimar – Erfurt – Gotha – Eisenach	60	Bombardier Talent 2	Abellio
RB 22	Leipzig – Zeitz – Gera – Saalfeld	120	Stadler Regio-Shuttle RS1	Erfurter Bahn
RB 30	Dresden – Freiberg – Chemnitz – Glauchau – Zwickau	30 (peak) Chemnitz–Zwickau; 60 Dresden–Zwickau	Alstom Coradia Continental	Mitteldeutsche Regiobahn
RB 31	Dresden – Cossebaude – Coswig – Großenhain – Elsterwerda-Biehla	60 Dresden–Coswig; 120 Coswig–Elsterwerda-Biehla	Class 112 + double-deck coaches / Bombardier Talent 2	DB Regio Nordost
RB 33	Dresden-Neustadt – Ottendorf-Okrilla – Königsbrück	60	Siemens Desiro Classic	DB Regio Südost
RB 34	(Dresden – Radeberg – Pulsnitz –) Kamenz – Straßgräbchen-Bernsdorf – Wiednitz – Hosena – Senftenberg	1 train pair during Saxon summer holidays;connecting to S 8	Siemens Desiro Classic	DB Regio Südost
RB 37	Glauchau – Meerane – Gößnitz	120	Stadler Regio-Shuttle RS1	City-Bahn Chemnitz
RB 45	Chemnitz – Mittweida – Döbeln – Riesa – Elsterwerda	Mon–Fri: 60 Chemnitz–Riesa; 120 Riesa–Elsterwerda; Sat–Sun: 120 Chemnitz–Riesa	Alstom Coradia Continental	Mitteldeutsche Regiobahn
RE 50	Dresden – Coswig – Riesa – Oschatz – Wurzen – Leipzig	60	Bombardier Talent 2 / Bombardier Traxx + double-deck coaches	DB Regio Südost
RB 60	Dresden – Bischofswerda – Bautzen – Löbau – Görlitz	120 Dresden–Bischofswerda; 60 Bischofswerda–Görlitz (only Mon–Fri)	Siemens Desiro Classic, Stadler Regio-Shuttle RS1	Trilex
RB 61	Dresden – Bischofswerda – Ebersbach – Zittau	120	Siemens Desiro Classic, Stadler Regio-Shuttle RS1	Trilex
RB 64	Hoyerswerda – Görlitz	120	Stadler Regio-Shuttle RS1	ODEG
RB 65	Cottbus – Weißwasser – Görlitz – Zittau	60	Siemens Desiro Classic	ODEG
RB 71	Pirna – Dürrröhrsdorf – Neustadt (Sachs) – Sebnitz	60 Pirna–Neustadt; 120 Neustadt–Sebnitz	Siemens Desiro Classic	DB Regio Südost
RB 72	Heidenau – Dohna – Glashütte – Altenberg	60	Siemens Desiro Classic	DB Regio Südost
RB 80	Chemnitz – Flöha – Annaberg-Buchholz – Cranzahl	60	Siemens Desiro Classic	Erzgebirgsbahn
RB 81	Chemnitz – Flöha – Pockau-Lengefeld – Olbernhau-Grünthal	60	Siemens Desiro Classic	Erzgebirgsbahn
RB 83	Freiberg – Mulda – Holzhau	60	Stadler Regio-Shuttle RS1	Freiberger Eisenbahn
RB 92	Glauchau – St. Egidien – Oelsnitz – Stollberg	60 Mon–Fri; 120 Sat+Sun	Stadler Regio-Shuttle RS1	City-Bahn Chemnitz
RB 95	Zwickau – Aue – Schwarzenberg – Johanngeorgenstadt	60	Siemens Desiro Classic	Erzgebirgsbahn
RB 110	Leipzig – Grimma – Döbeln	Mon–Fri; 30 Leipzig–Grimma; 60 Grimma–Döbeln; Sat–Sun; 60 Leipzig–Grimma; 120 Grimma–Döbeln	Bombardier Talent / Stadler Regio-Shuttle RS1	Mitteldeutsche Regiobahn
RB 113	Leipzig – Bad Lausick – Geithain	60	Alstom Coradia A TER (class 641)	DB Regio Südost
S 1 (Dresden)	Meißen-Triebischtal – Coswig – Radebeul – Dresden – Heidenau – Pirna – Bad Schandau – Schöna	10/20 (peak) Meißen-Triebischtal–Pirna; 30 Meißen-Triebischtal–Bad Schandau; 60 Bad Schandau–Schöna	Bombardier Traxx + 4 or 5 double-deck coaches extra peak services: class 143 + 2 double-deck coaches	Dresden S-Bahn / DB Regio Südost
S 2 (Dresden)	Pirna – Heidenau – Dresden Hbf – Dresden Flughafen	30	class 143 + 2 double-deck coaches	Dresden S-Bahn / DB Regio Südost
S 3 (Dresden)	Dresden Hbf – Freital – Tharandt (– Freiberg)	10/50 (peak); 60 Dresden – Tharandt; Tharandt–Freiberg only in the peak	class 143 + 2 double-deck coaches	Dresden S-Bahn / DB Regio Südost
S 8 (Dresden)	Dresden Hbf – Dresden-Neustadt – Radeberg – Pulsnitz – Kamenz	30 (peak); 60 (peak)	Siemens Desiro Classic	Dresden S-Bahn / DB Regio Südost
S 1 (Mitteldeutschland)	Leipzig-Stötteritz – City-Tunnel – Leipzig-Plagwitz – Leipzig Miltitzer Allee	30	Bombardier Talent 2	S-Bahn Mitteldeutschland / DB Regio Südost
S 2 (Mitteldeutschland)	Leipzig-Stötteritz – City-Tunnel – Leipzig Messe – Delitzsch – Bitterfeld – Dessau/ – Wittenberg (– Jüterbog)	30 Leipzig-Stötteritz–Bitterfeld; 120 Bitterfeld–Dessau/Wittenberg	Bombardier Talent 2	S-Bahn Mitteldeutschland / DB Regio Südost
S 3 (Mitteldeutschland)	Halle-Nietleben – Halle Hbf – Schkeuditz – City-Tunnel – Leipzig-Stötteritz – Borsdorf – Wurzen (– Oschatz)	30 Halle-Nietleben–Wurzen extra peak services (Mon–Fri): Schkeuditz–Leipzig Hbf some trains: Wurzen–Oschatz	Bombardier Talent 2	S-Bahn Mitteldeutschland / DB Regio Südost
S 4 (Mitteldeutschland)	Markkleeberg-Gaschwitz – Leipzig-Connewitz – City-Tunnel – Taucha – Eilenburg – Torgau – Falkenberg	30 Markkleeberg-Gaschwitz–Taucha; 30/30/60 Taucha–Torgau; 120 Torgau–Falkenberg	Bombardier Talent 2	S-Bahn Mitteldeutschland / DB Regio Südost
S 5 (Mitteldeutschland)	Halle Hbf – Leipzig/Halle Flughafen – City-Tunnel – Markkleeberg – Altenburg – Gößnitz – Crimmitschau – Werdau – Zwickau Hbf	60 Halle Hbf–Altenburg; 120 Altenburg–Zwickau	Bombardier Talent 2	S-Bahn Mitteldeutschland / DB Regio Südost
S 5X (Mitteldeutschland)	Halle Hbf – Leipzig/Halle Flughafen – City-Tunnel – Markkleeberg – Altenburg – Gößnitz – Crimmitschau – Werdau – Zwickau Hbf	60	Bombardier Talent 2	S-Bahn Mitteldeutschland / DB Regio Südost
S 6 (Mitteldeutschland)	Geithain – Borna – Markkleeberg – City-Tunnel – Leipzig Messe	30 Leipzig Messe–Borna; 60 Borna–Geithain	Bombardier Talent 2	S-Bahn Mitteldeutschland / DB Regio Südost
S 9 (Mitteldeutschland)	Eilenburg – Delitzsch ob Bf – Halle Hbf	60 (Mon–Fri peak); 120 (Mon–Fri off-peak and Sat+Sun)	Class 143 + double-deck coaches	S-Bahn Mitteldeutschland / DB Regio Südost
S 10 (Mitteldeutschland)	Leipzig Hbf – Leipzig-Plagwitz – Leipzig Miltitzer Allee	30	Bombardier Talent 2	S-Bahn Mitteldeutschland / DB Regio Südost
L 7	Liberec – Zittau – Mittelherwigsdorf – Varnsdorf – Seifhennersdorf	60 Liberec–Varnsdorf (30 min between Liberec and Hrádek nad Nisou at times); 120 Varnsdorf–Seifhennersdorf	Siemens Desiro Classic, Stadler Regio-Shuttle RS1	Trilex
U 28	Rumburk – Sebnitz – Bad Schandau – Schöna – Děčín	120 (60 min between Rumburk and Dolní Poustevna and between Schöna and Děčín at times)	Siemens Desiro Classic	DB Regio Südost in cooperation with ČD
C 11	Chemnitz Hbf – Chemnitz Zentralhaltestelle – Altchemnitz – Stollberg	30	Variobahn	City-Bahn Chemnitz
C 13	Aue (Sachs) – Thalheim (Erzgeb) – Chemnitz Technopark – Chemnitz Zentralhaltestelle – Chemnitz Hbf – Burgstädt	60	Citylink (class 690)	City-Bahn Chemnitz
C 14	Thalheim (Erzgeb) – Chemnitz Technopark – Chemnitz Zentralhaltestelle – Chemnitz Hbf – Mittweida	60 (Thalheim–Technopark only Mon–Sat)	Citylink (class 690)	City-Bahn Chemnitz
C 15	Chemnitz Technopark – Chemnitz Zentralhaltestelle – Chemnitz Hbf – Hainichen	60	Citylink (class 690)	City-Bahn Chemnitz

=== Sächsische Dampfeisenbahngesellschaft ===
Line	Route	KBS	Frequency	Notes
Fichtelbergbahn	Cranzahl - Kurort Oberwiesenthal	518	4x per day	Fichtelberg Railway, narrow gauge
Lößnitzgrundbahn	Radebeul Ost - Radeburg	509	4x per day	Lößnitz Valley Railway, narrow gauge
Weißeritztalbahn	Freital-Hainsberg - Kurort Kipsdorf	513	2x per day	Weisseritz Valley Railway, narrow gauge

== See also ==
- List of scheduled railway routes in Germany
