= Radeberg station =

Railway station in Radeberg, Germany

Radeberg
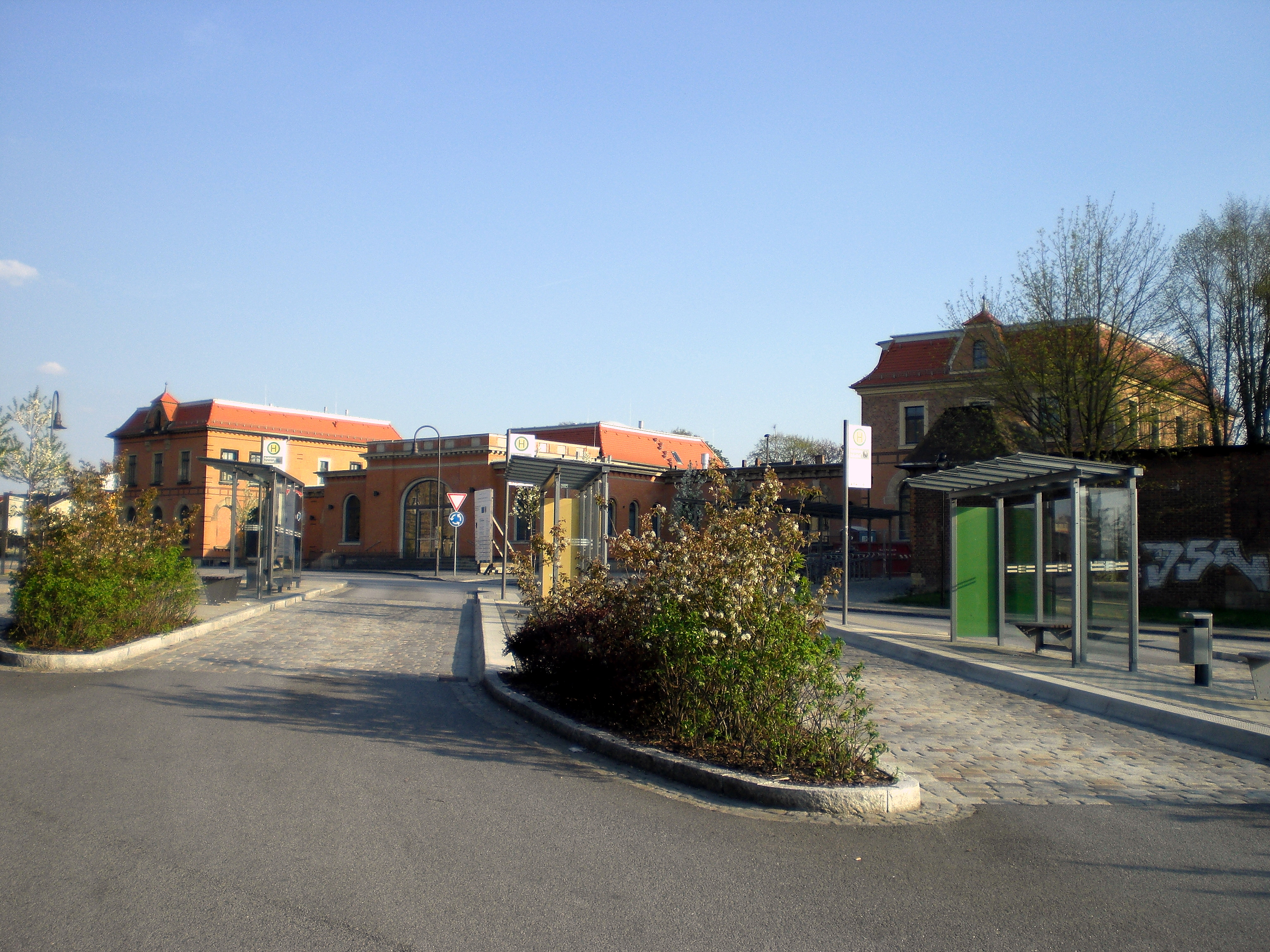
- Radeberg railway station

General information
- Location: Radeberg, Saxony, Germany
- Coordinates: 51°06′42″N 13°54′46″E
- Line: Görlitz–Dresden railway
- Platforms: 2
- Tracks: 5

Services
Preceding station	Trilex	Following station
Dresden-Klotzsche towards Dresden Hbf	RE 1	Arnsdorf bei Dresden towards Zgorzelec
Dresden-Klotzsche towards Dresden Hbf	RE 2	Arnsdorf bei Dresden towards Liberec
Langebrück (Sachs) towards Dresden Hbf	RB 60	Arnsdorf bei Dresden towards Görlitz
Langebrück (Sachs) towards Dresden Hbf	RB 61	Arnsdorf bei Dresden towards Zittau
Preceding station	Dresden S-Bahn	Following station
Langebrück (Sachs) towards Dresden Hbf	S 8	Kleinröhrsdorf towards Kamenz (Sachs)
Langebrück (Sachs) towards Dresden Hbf	S 8	Arnsdorf bei Dresden towards Kamenz (Sachs)
Location

Radeberg (German: Bahnhof Radeberg) is a railway station in the town of Radeberg, Saxony, Germany. The station lies on the Görlitz–Dresden railway, train services are operated by Trilex and DB Regio Südost.

== Train lines ==
The station is served by several local and regional trains.
