= Arnsdorf bei Dresden station =

Railway station in Arnsdorf, Germany

Arnsdorf (b Dresden)
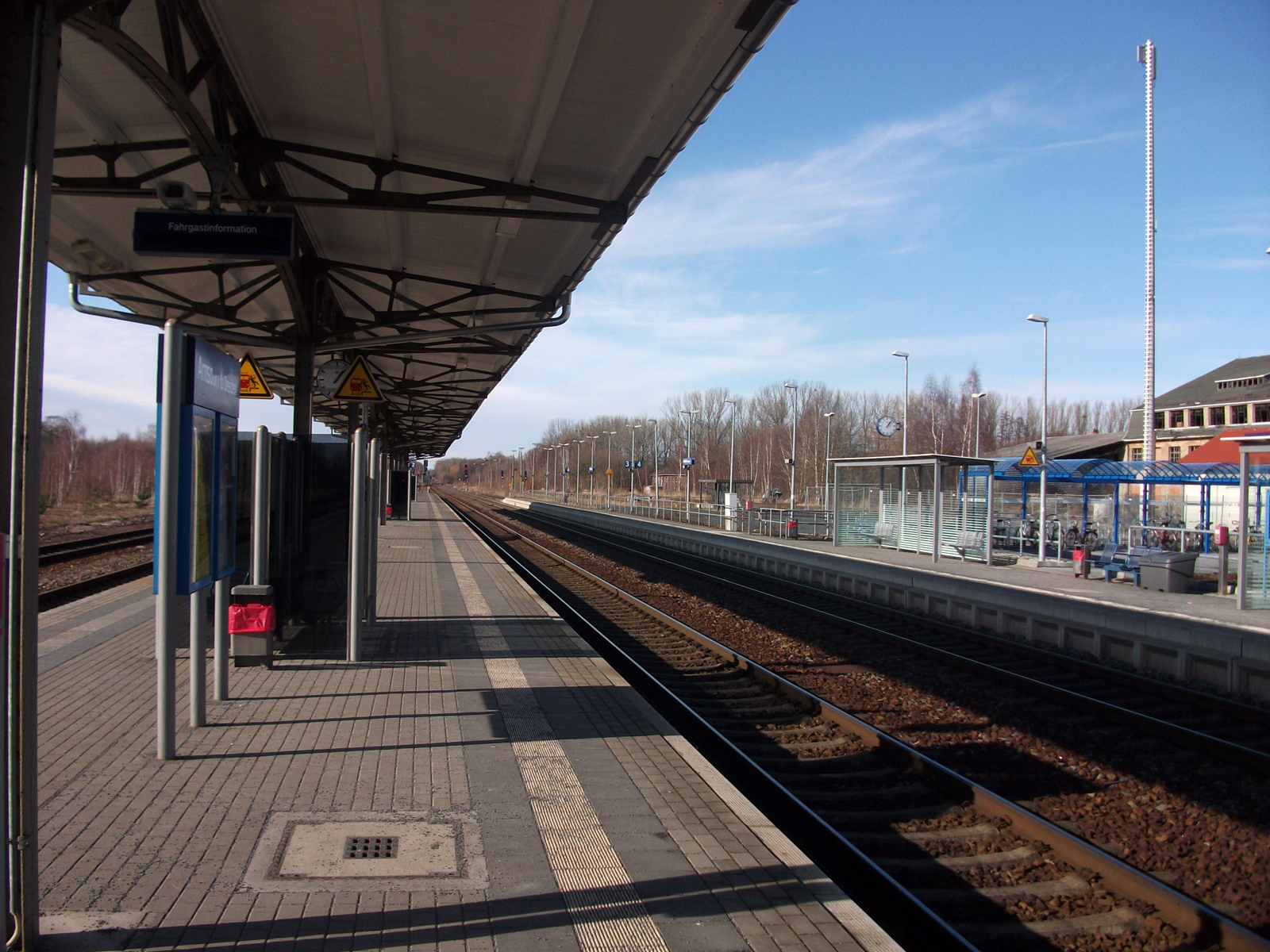
- Arnsdorf station

General information
- Location: Arnsdorf, Saxony, Germany
- Coordinates: 51°05′34″N 13°58′56″E
- Lines: Görlitz–Dresden railway Kamenz–Pirna railway
- Platforms: 3
- Tracks: 4

Services
Preceding station	Trilex	Following station
Radeberg towards Dresden Hbf	RE 1	Bischofswerda towards Zgorzelec
Radeberg towards Dresden Hbf	RE 2	Bischofswerda towards Liberec
Radeberg towards Dresden Hbf	RB 60	Großharthau towards Görlitz
Radeberg towards Dresden Hbf	RB 61	Großharthau towards Zittau
Preceding station	Dresden S-Bahn	Following station
Radeberg towards Dresden Hbf	S 8	Kleinröhrsdorf towards Kamenz (Sachs)
Location

Arnsdorf (German: Bahnhof Arnsdorf (b Dresden)) is a railway station in the town of Arnsdorf, Saxony, Germany. The station lies on the Görlitz–Dresden railway and Kamenz–Pirna railway. The section from Arnsdorf to Dürrröhrsdorf, which used to be part of Kamenz–Pirna railway, was closed in 2007.

== Train services ==
The station is served by several local and regional services, which are operated by Vogtlandbahn and DB Regio Südost (as part of the Dresden S-Bahn).
