= Bischofswerda station =

Railway station in Bischofswerda, Germany

Bischofswerda
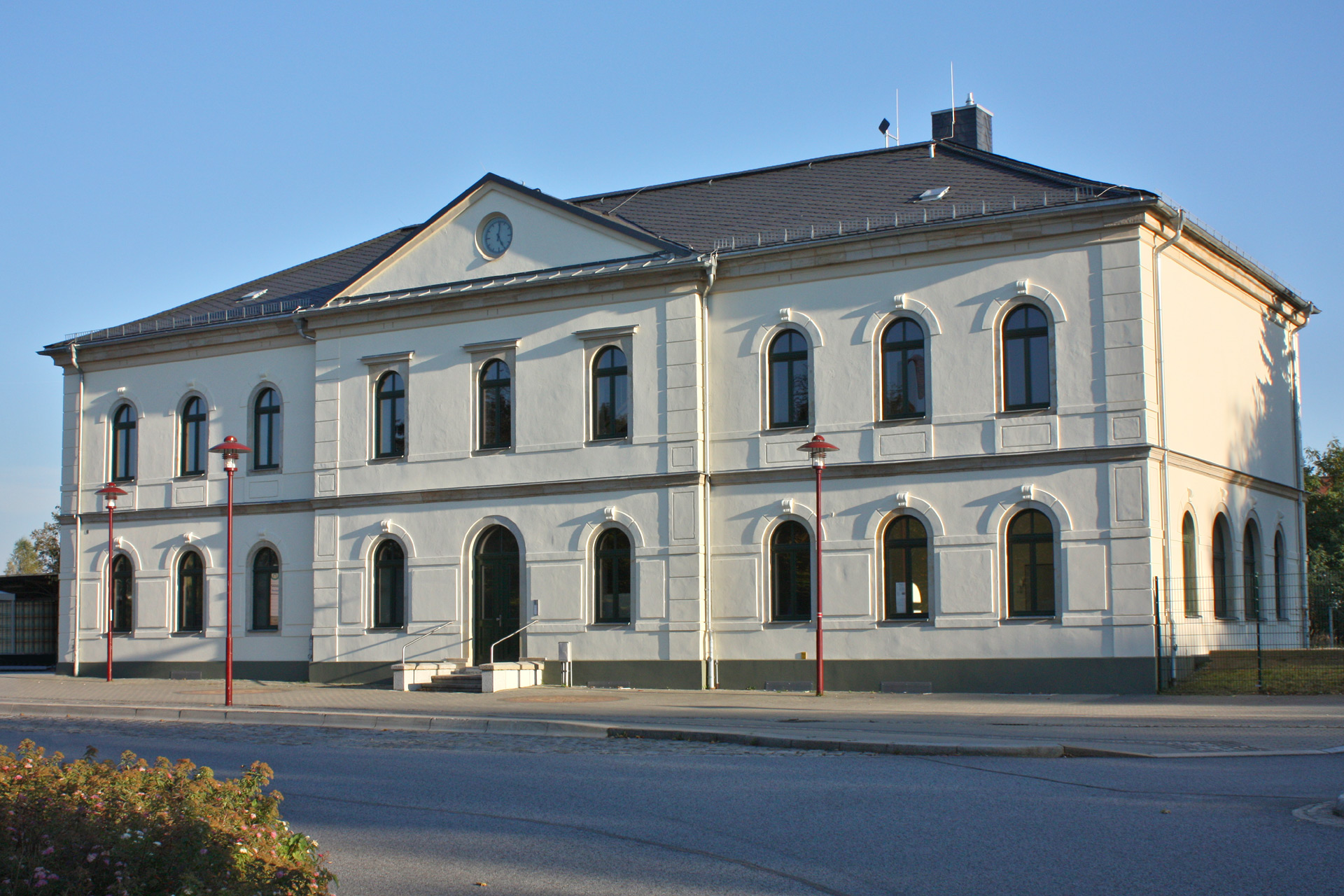
- Bischofswerda station

General information
- Location: Bischofswerda, Saxony, Germany
- Coordinates: 51°07′31″N 14°11′11″E
- Lines: Görlitz–Dresden railway Neukirch West–Bischofswerda railway Kamenz–Bischofswerda railway (closed)
- Platforms: 3
- Tracks: 4

Services
Preceding station	Trilex	Following station
Arnsdorf bei Dresden towards Dresden Hbf	RE 1	Bautzen towards Zgorzelec
Arnsdorf bei Dresden towards Dresden Hbf	RE 2	Neukirch Ost towards Liberec
Weickersdorf (Sachs) towards Dresden Hbf	RB 60	Demitz-Thumitz towards Görlitz
Weickersdorf (Sachs) towards Dresden Hbf	RB 61	Schmölln (Ol) towards Zittau
Location

Bischofswerda (German: Bahnhof Bischofswerda) is a railway station in the town of Bischofswerda, Saxony, Germany. The station lies on the Görlitz–Dresden and Neukirch West–Bischofswerda railway lines. There used to be also a line to Kamenz.

== Train services ==
The station is served by regional and local services, which are operated by Trilex.

== Bus services ==
These buses depart from the bus station at the front of the station.

- A (Town service)
- B (Town service)
- 114 (Bischofswerda – Gaußig – Bautzen)
- 177
- 178
- 180
- 181
- 182
- 183
- 185
- 188
- 189
- 191
- 193
- 264
- 305
- 306
