= RB 23 =

RB 23 is the designation of several regional rail services in Germany:

- RB 23, operated by DB Regio Mitte between Mayen Ost and Limburg (Lahn)
- RB 23, operated by DB Regio Nordost between BER Airport – Terminal 1-2 and Golm
- RB 23, operated by DB Regio Nordost between Züssow and Świnoujście Centrum
- RB 23, operated by DB Regio NRW between Bad Münstereifel and Euskirchen
- RB 23, operated by Oberpfalzbahn between Regensburg and Marktredwitz or Neustadt (Waldnaab)
