= Elsterberg station =

Railway station in Elsterberg, Germany

Elsterberg
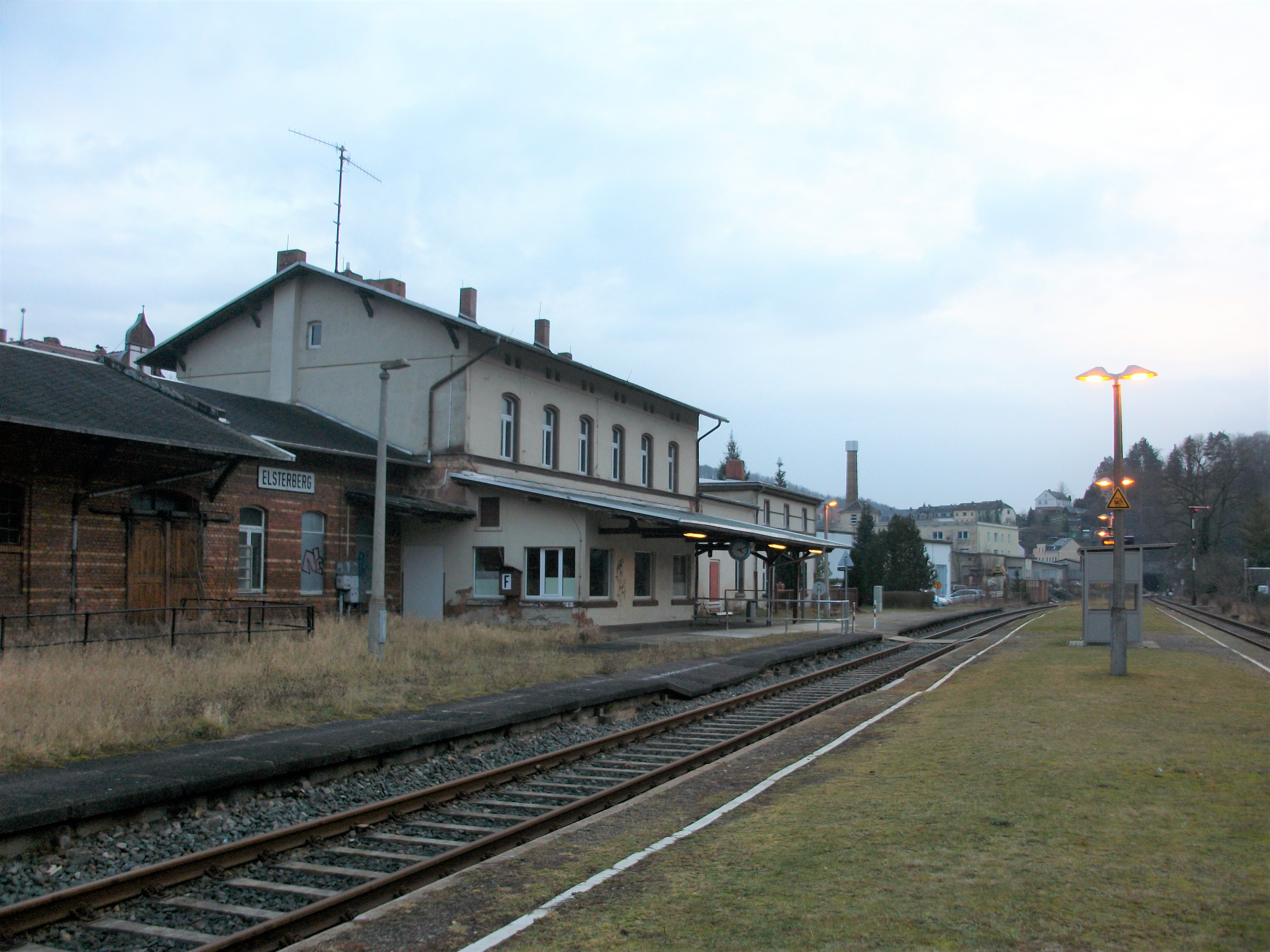
- 2018

General information
- Location: Bahnhofstraße 39; 07985 Elsterberg; Saxony; Germany
- Coordinates: 50.6136°N 12.1676°E
- System: Bf
- Owner: DB Netz
- Operator: DB Station&Service
- Lines: Gera Süd–Weischlitz railway (KBS 541)
- Platforms: 1 island platform
- Tracks: 2
- Train operators: Vogtlandbahn

Construction
- Parking: yes
- Cycle facilities: yes
- Accessible: yes

Other information
- Station code: 1567
- DS100 code: UELB
- IBNR: 8011487
- Category: 6
- Website: www.bahnhof.de

Services
Preceding station	Vogtlandbahn	Following station
Greiz-Dölau towards Gera Hbf	RB 4	Elsterberg-Kunstseidenwerk towards Weischlitz
Location
- Location within Saxony Location within Germany Location within Europe

Elsterberg station is a railway station in the municipality of Elsterberg, located in the Vogtlandkreis in Saxony, Germany.
