= Arnsdorf =

- Municipality
- Coat of arms

- Location of Arnsdorf within Bautzen district
- Interactive map of Arnsdorf
- Location within Germany Location within Saxony
- Coordinates: 51°6′N 13°58′E
- Country: Germany
- State: Saxony
- District: Bautzen
- Subdivisions: 4

Government
  - Mayor (2020–27): Frank Eisold (CDU)

Area
  - Total: 35.87 km^{2} (13.85 sq mi)
- Elevation: 290 m (950 ft)

Population (2025-12-31)
  - Total: 4,982
  - Density: 138.9/km^{2} (359.7/sq mi)
- Time zone: UTC+01:00 (CET)
  - Summer (DST): UTC+02:00 (CEST)
- Postal codes: 01477
- Dialling codes: 035200
- Vehicle registration: BZ, BIW, HY, KM
- Website: www.gemeinde-arnsdorf.de

Arnsdorf (German pronunciation: [ˈaʁnsdɔʁf]; Upper Sorbian: Warnoćicy) is a municipality in the district of Bautzen in the state of Saxony, in eastern Germany.

Arnsdorf bei Dresden railway station is located in the southern part of the village and is part of the Görlitz–Dresden railway and Kamenz–Pirna railway lines.

== Gallery ==
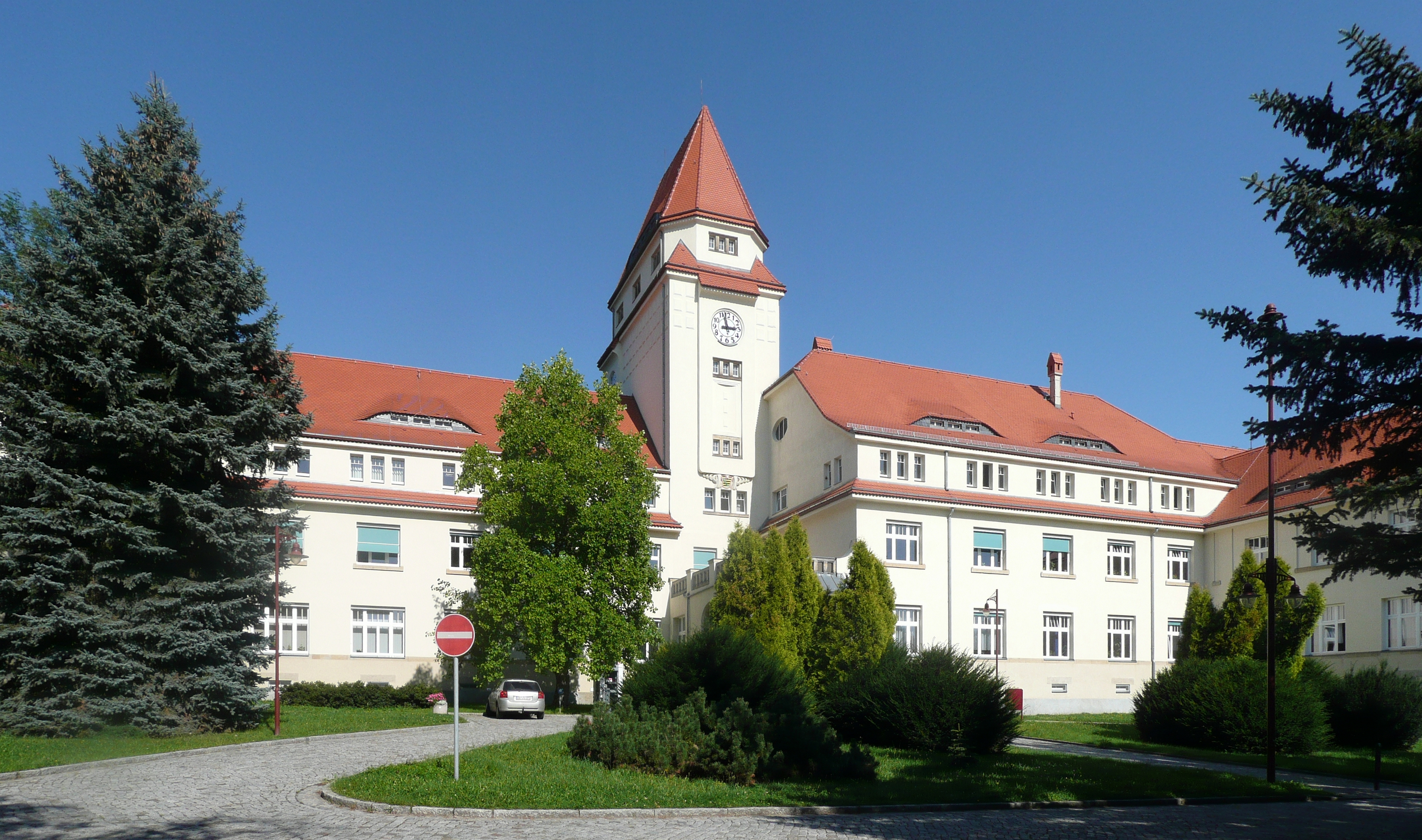
Administrative building of the historic Saxon (Royal) Hospital

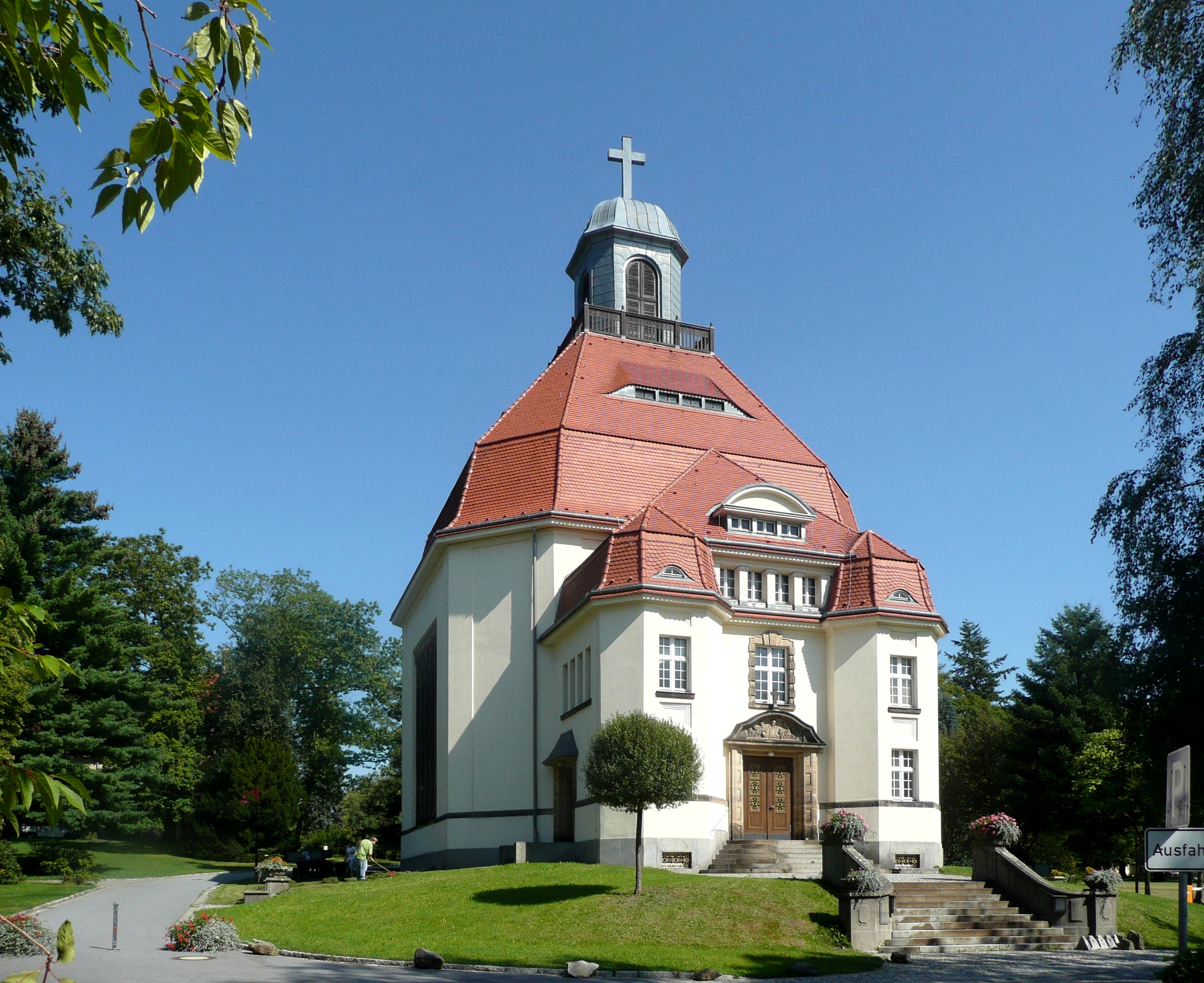
The church, Anstaltskirche Arnsdorf

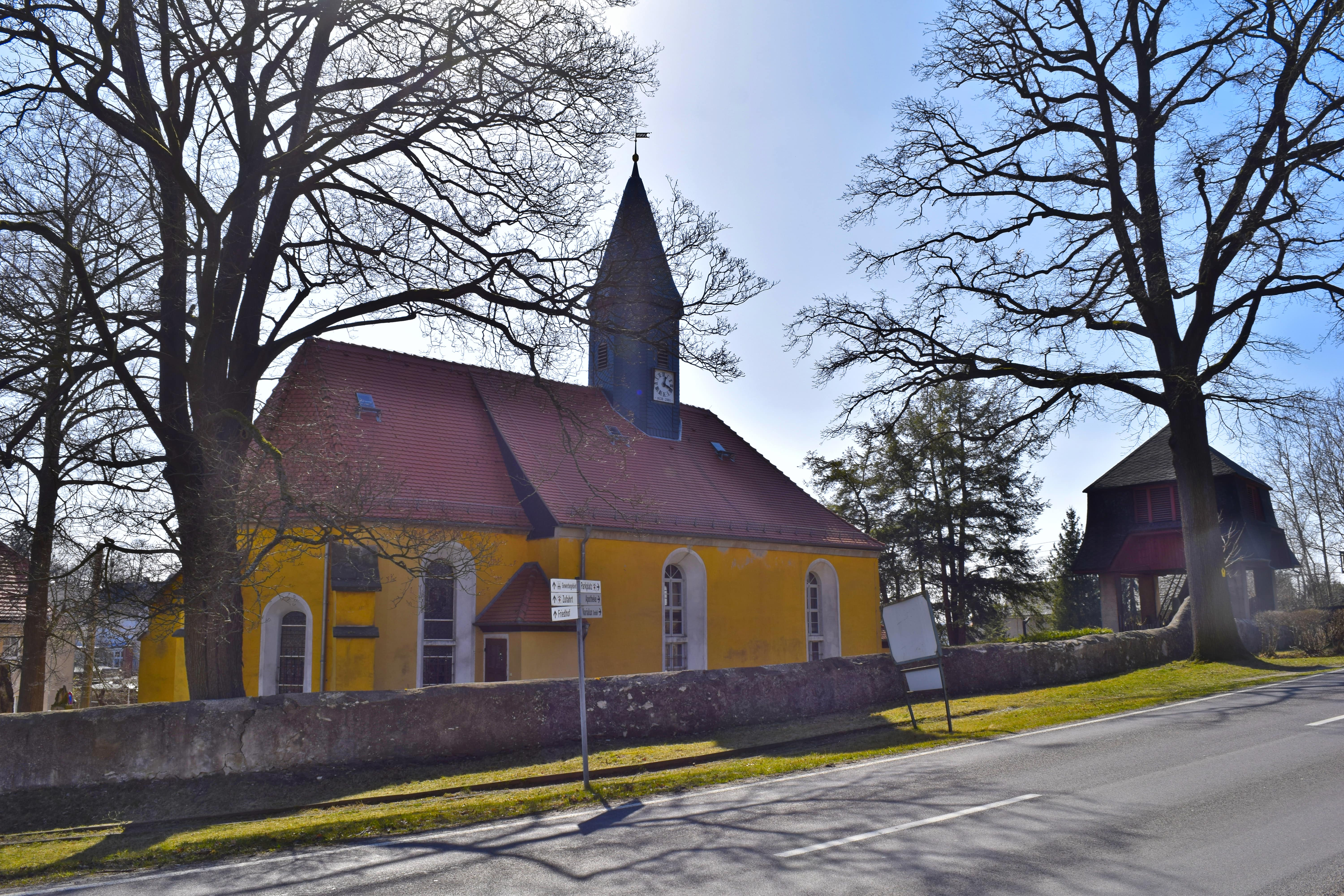
The village church Dorfkirche Arnsdorf, Bautzen

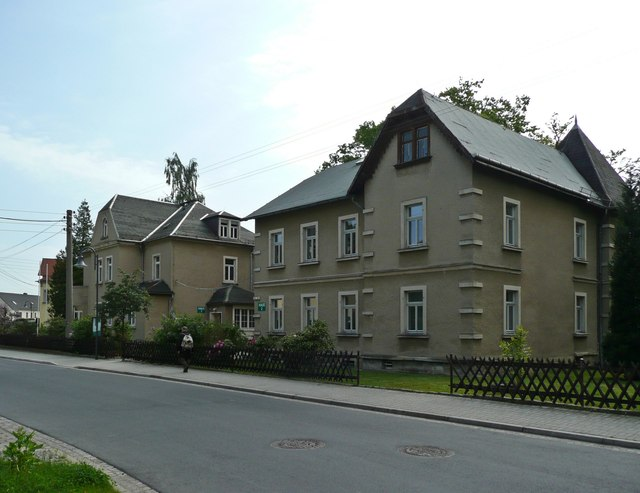
Municipal authority buildings in Arnsdorf, 2010

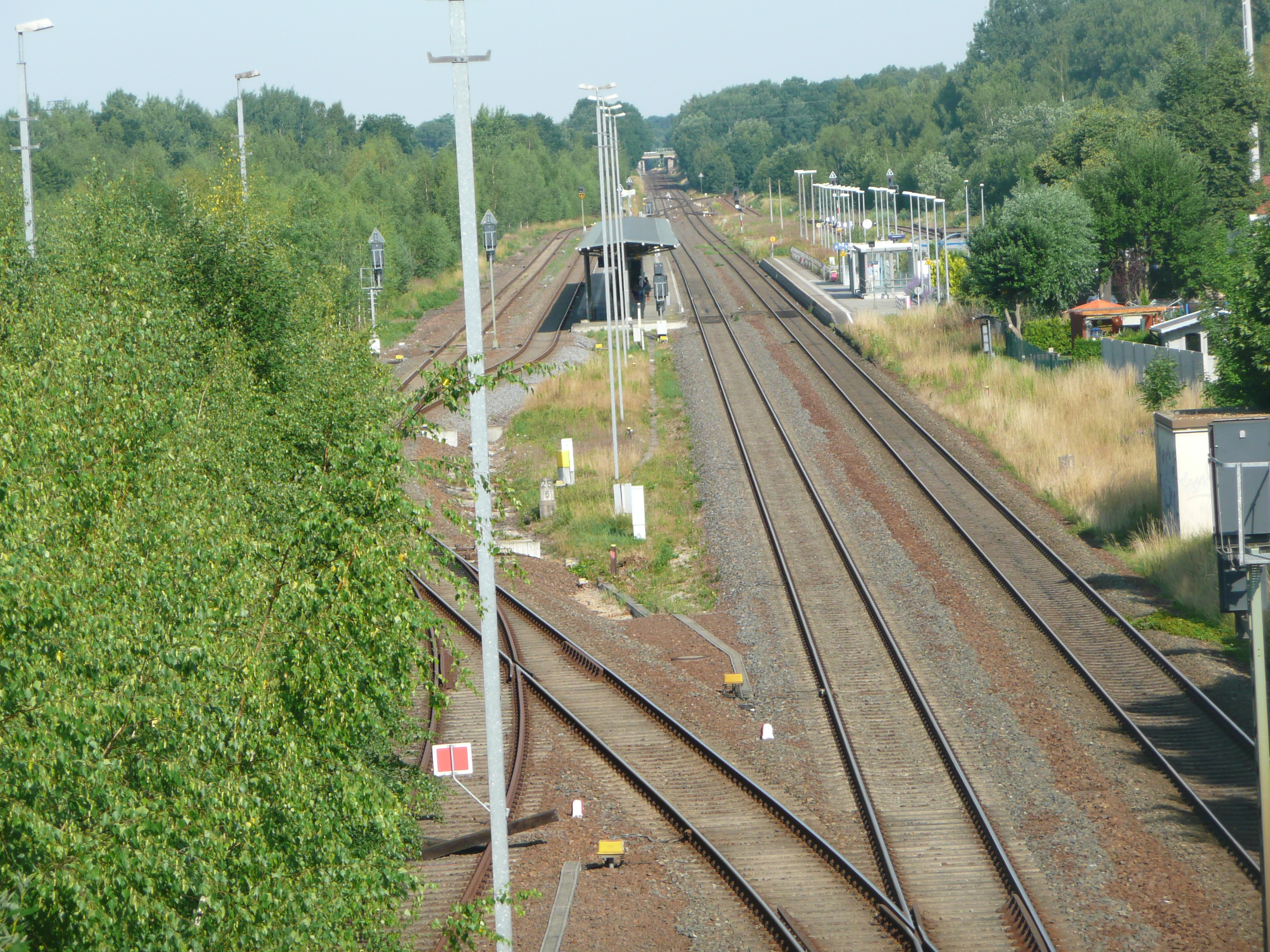
Arnsdorf bei Dresden railway station
