= Zittau station =

Railway station in Saxony, Germany

Zittau
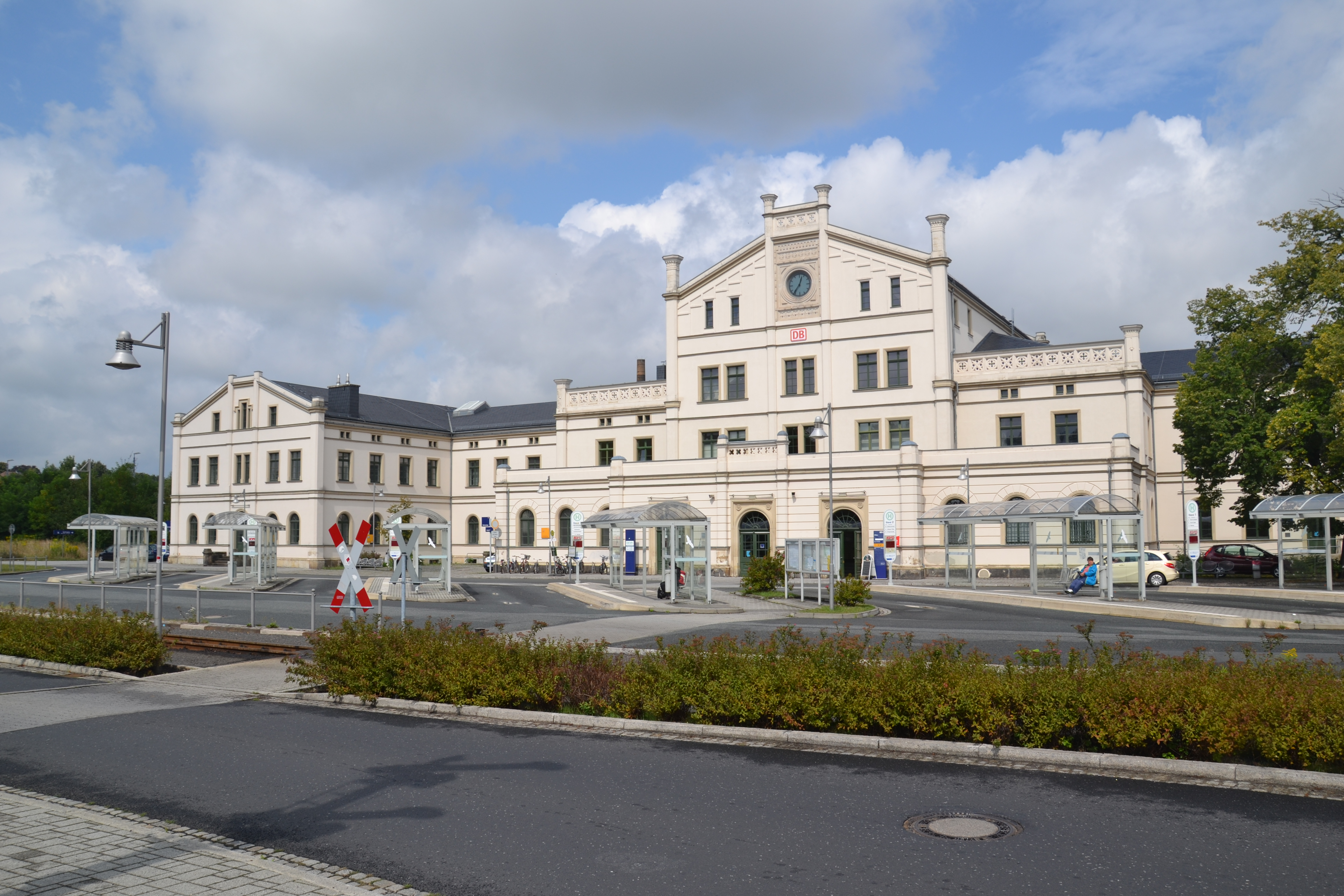
- The station building in 2014 as seen from south

General information
- Location: Bahnhofstr. 39, 02763 Zittau; Saxony, Germany
- Coordinates: 50.9044692°N 14.8058478°E
- Lines: Zittau–Löbau (km 26.75); Liberec–Zittau (km 26.75); Zittau–Hagenwerder (km 0.01); Zittau–Hermsdorf (km 0.01) (defunct); Zittau–Oybin/Jonsdorf (km 0.01)
- Platforms: 7 standard gauge 2 narrow gauge

Other information
- Station code: 7032
- DS100 code: DZ
- Category: 4
- Website: http://www.bahnhof.de/bahnhof-de/Zittau.html

History
- Opened: 10 June 1848

Services
Preceding station	Trilex	Following station
Oberoderwitz towards Dresden Hbf	RE 2	Hrádek nad Nisou towards Liberec
Mittelherwigsdorf towards Dresden Hbf	RB 61	Terminus
Mittelherwigsdorf towards Seifhennersdorf	L 7	Hrádek nad Nisou towards Liberec
Preceding station	Ostdeutsche Eisenbahn	Following station
Hirschfelde towards Cottbus Hbf	RB 65	Terminus
Location

Zittau station (German: Bahnhof Zittau) is a railway station in Zittau, Germany. The station is located on the Liberec–Zittau, Zittau–Löbau and Zittau–Hagenwerder standard gauge lines as well as it is one terminus of narrow gauge Zittau–Kurort Oybin/Kurort Jonsdorf railway. Until 1945 narrow gauge Zittau–Hermsdorf railway to today's Bogatynia in Poland and Heřmanice in the Czech Republic also began at Zittau station.

The standard gauge parts of the station are operated by DB Station&Service (platforms) and DB Netz (tracks), narrow gauge parts by Saxon-Upper Lusatian Railway Company.

== Services ==
=== Railway services ===
As of May 2017 there are hourly services to Bischofswerda and Dresden (lines RE 2 and RB 61 run by Vogtlandbahn), to Liberec (lines RE 2 and L 7 run by Vogtlandbahn), Varnsdorf–Rybniště/Seifhennersdorf (line L 7 run by Vogtlandbahn) and to Görlitz and Cottbus (line OE 65 run by Ostdeutsche Eisenbahn). Narrow gauge services to Kurort Oybin and/or Kurort Jonsdorf run five times daily during main tourist seasons, two times daily during off-season. On summer weekend days there are three additional pairs of trains, which makes a peak of up to eight daily trains on summer weekend days.

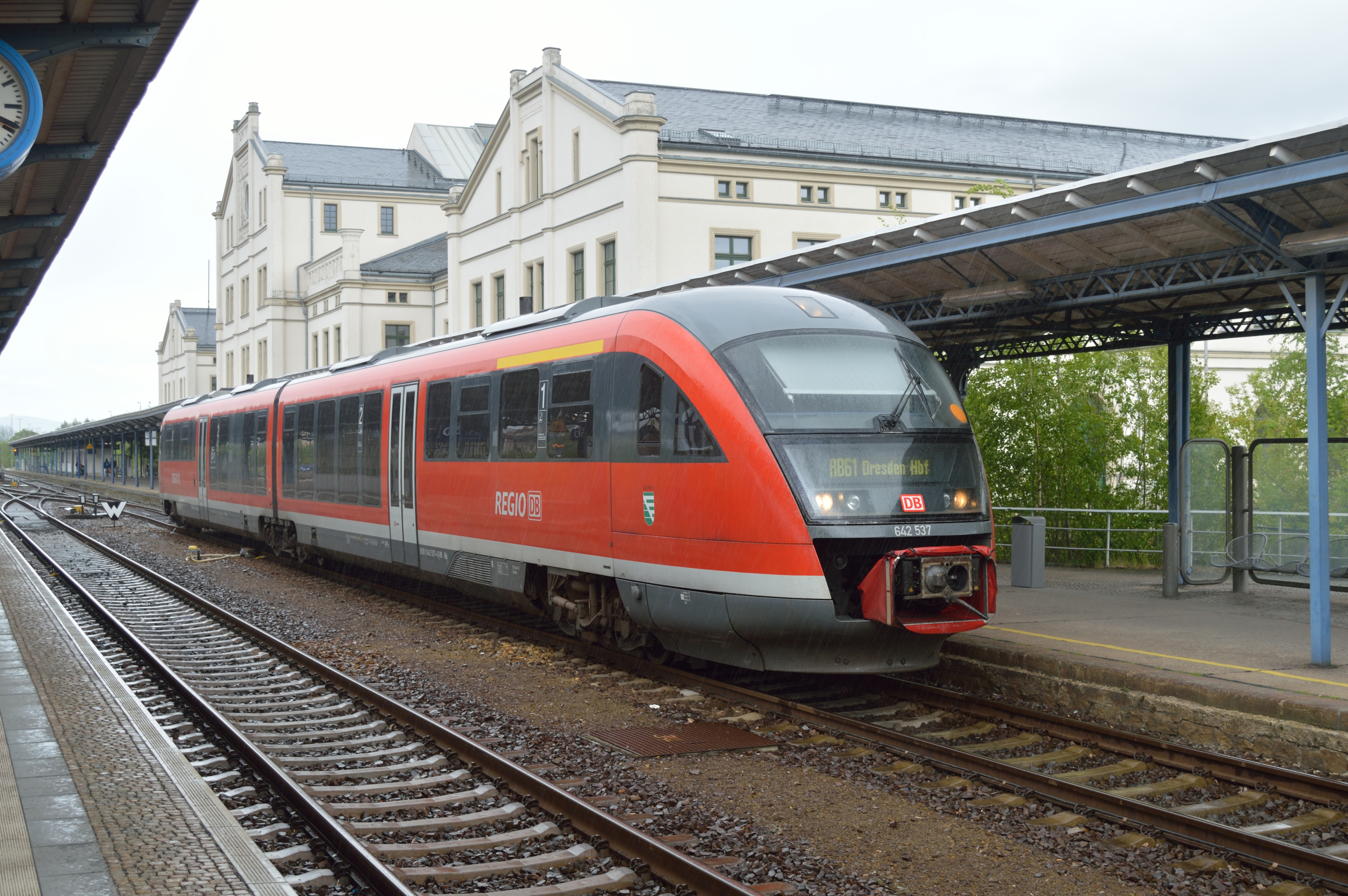
A class 642 DMU of DB Regio in May 2014 running as RB 61 to Dresden. This service was overtaken in December 2014 by Vogtlandbahn, which uses the same type of cars.

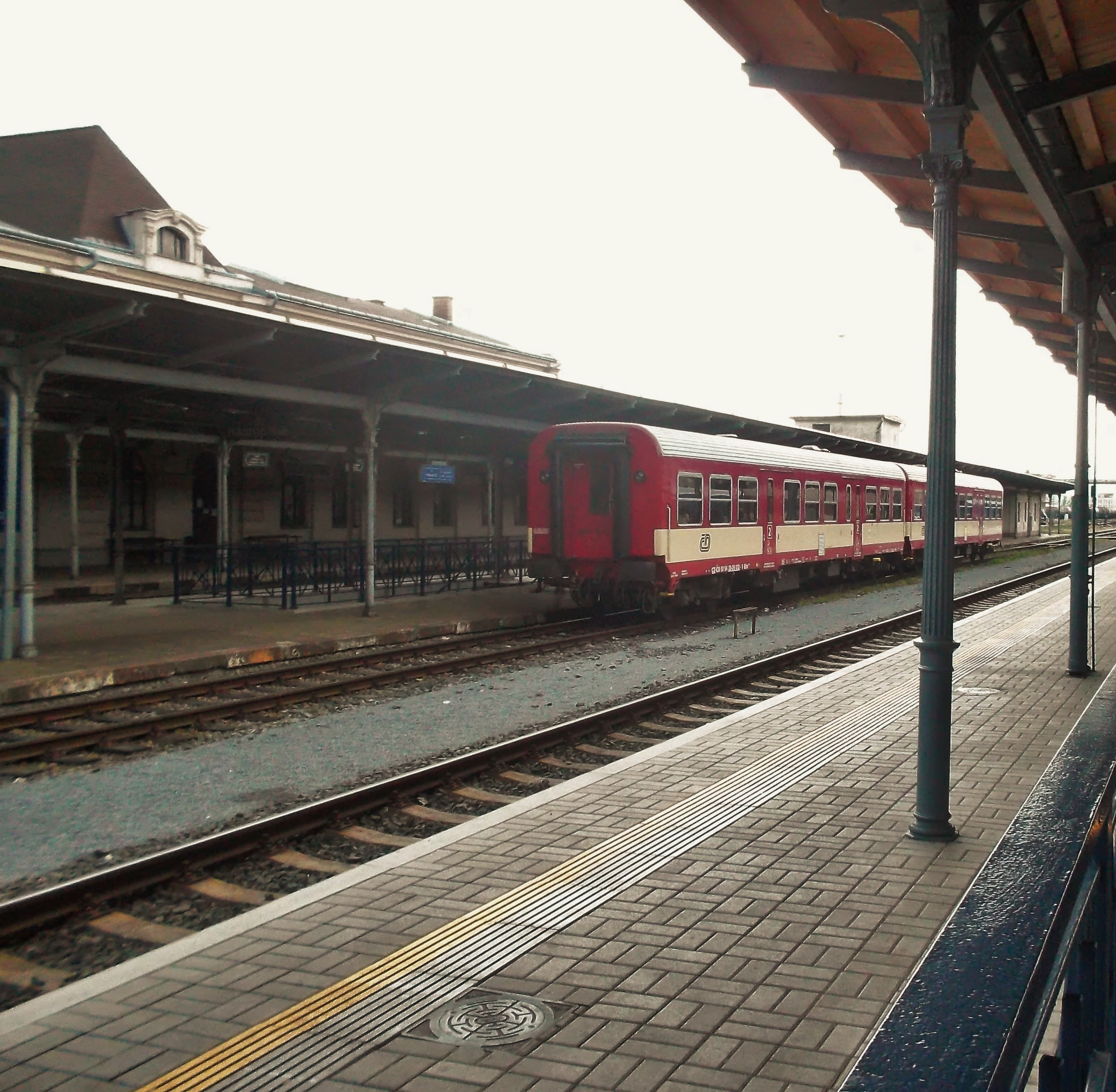
Before cross-border line L7 (initially named as TLX) between Liberec, Zittau, Rybniště and Seifhennersdorf started operation in December 2010, there had been regular services by České dráhy even in Zittau.

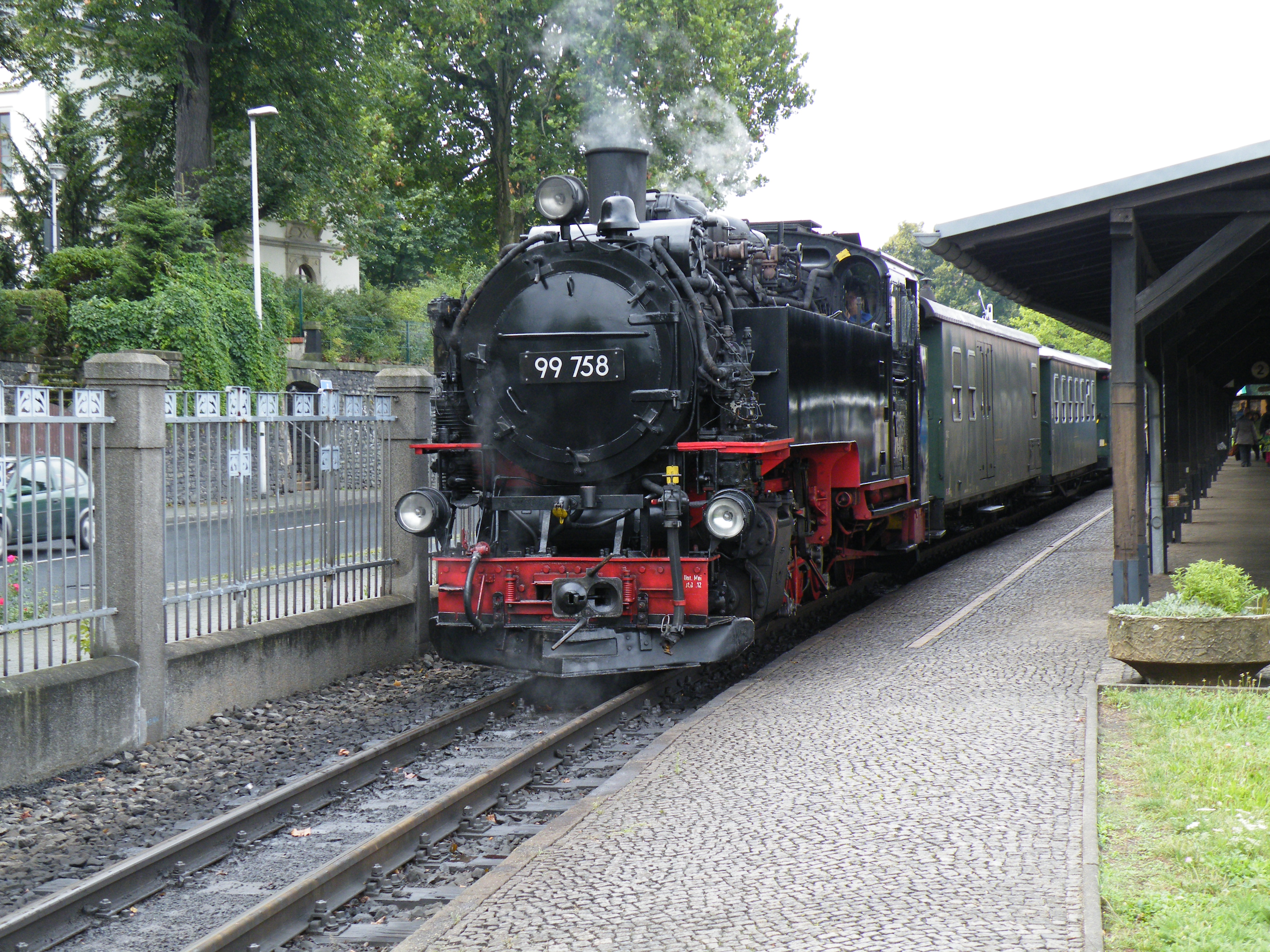
Narrow gauge steam train of SOEG to Kurort Oybin in 2014.

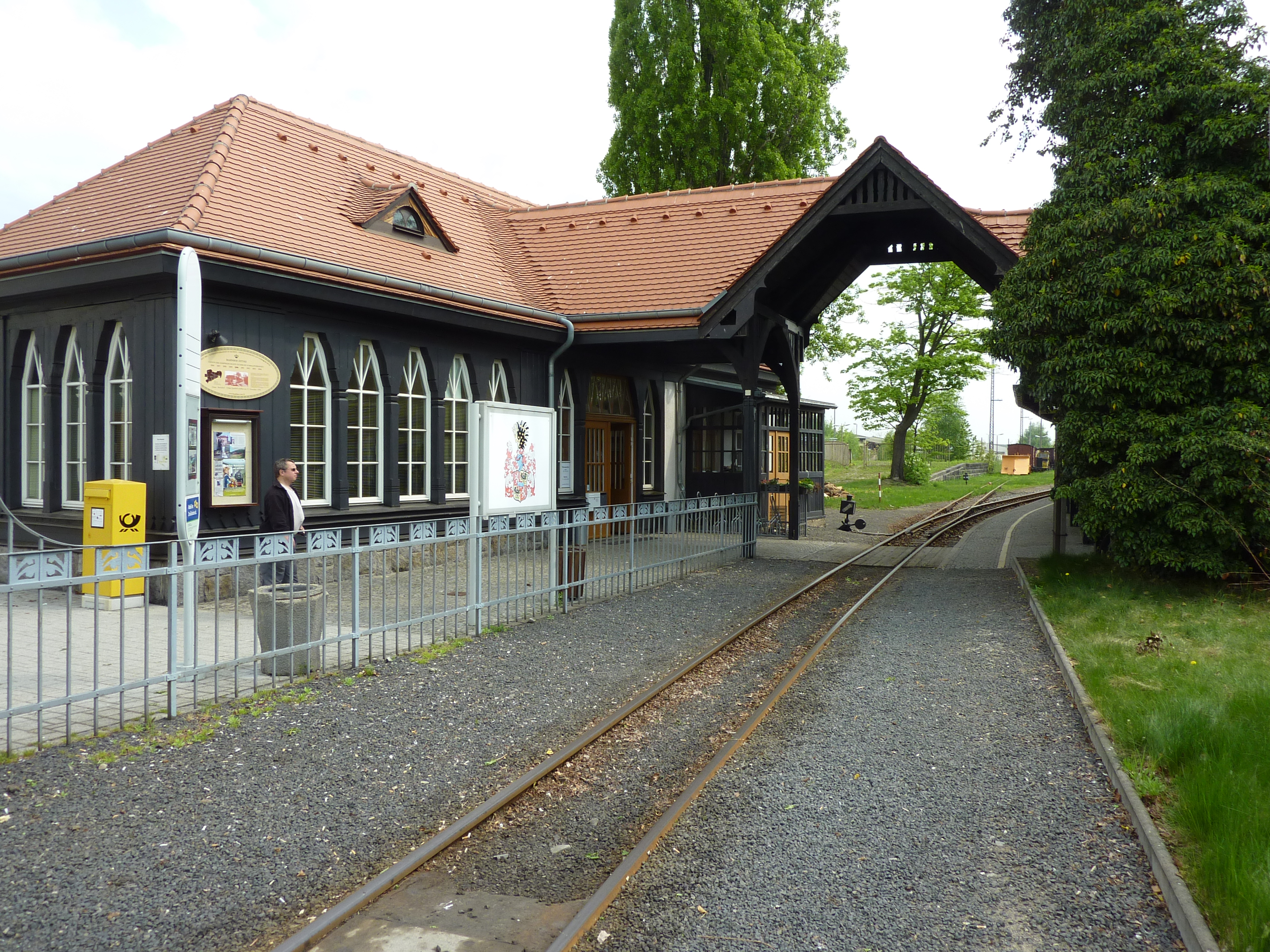
Entrance to the narrow gauge station in 2011.

=== Local transport ===
City bus lines A, B and C as well as many regional bus lines frequently stop at this station. The bus station is located in front of the railway station building.

== Station overview ==
The standard gauge facilities are situated north of the station building, the narrow gauge facilities south of it. The narrow gauge passenger station is located east of the square with the bus stop, a depot west of it.

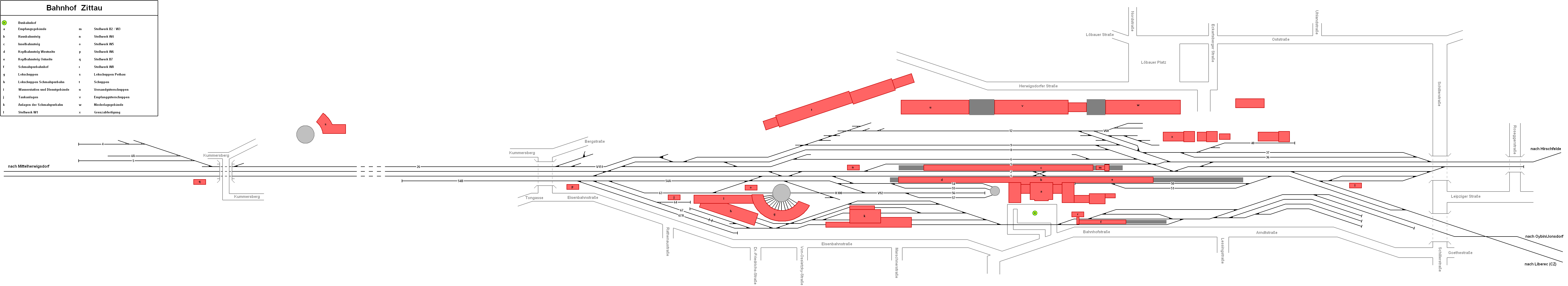
A map showing the extensive tracks of Zittau railway station as of 2012.
