= Liberec railway station =

Railway station in Liberec, Czech Republic

Liberec
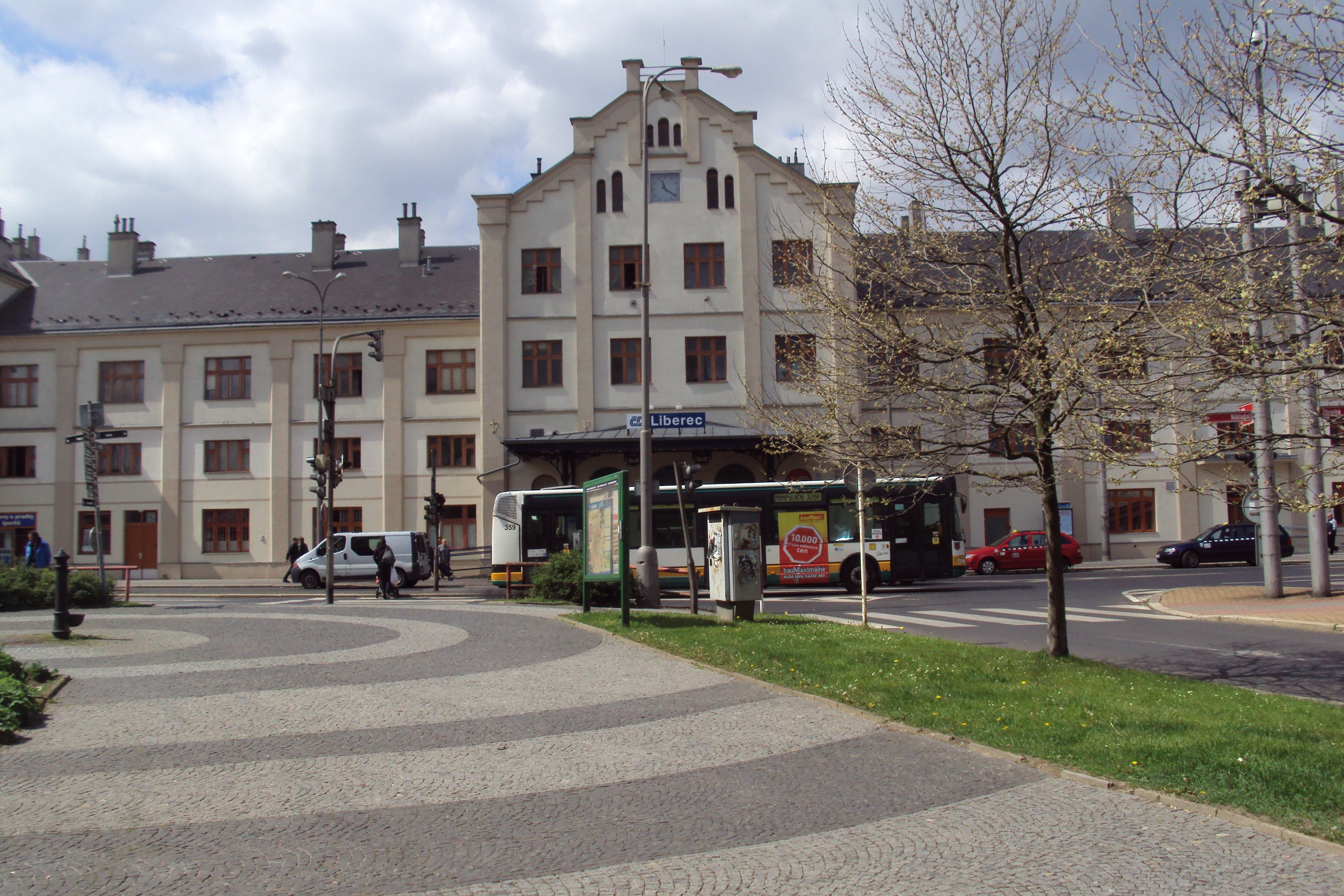
- Liberec railway station

General information
- Location: Nákladní 2/344; 460 02 Liberec; Czech Republic
- Coordinates: 50°45′41″N 15°2′44″E
- Owner: Czech Republic
- Operator: Správa železnic
- Lines: Pardubice - Jaroměř – Liberec (030, 031); Liberec – Tanvald – Harrachov (036); Liberec – Zawidów (037); Liberec – Česká Lípa (086); Liberec – Rybniště/Seifhennersdorf (089)
- Platforms: 5(10)
- Connections: Trams and buses

Other information
- Station code: 54542126

History
- Opened: 1 December 1859; 166 years ago
- Rebuilt: 1900; 2009–2011

Services
Preceding station	České dráhy	Following station
Terminus	R14a	Rychnov u Jablonce nad Nisou toward Pardubice
Křižany or Jablonné v Podještědí toward Ústí nad Labem	R15	Terminus
Stráž nad Nisou toward Frýdlant	Stopping trains	Liberec-Horní Růžodol toward Česká Lípa
Stráž nad Nisou toward Frýdlant	Stopping trains	Pilínkov toward Turnov
Stráž nad Nisou toward Frýdlant	Stopping trains	Liberec-Rochlice toward Tanvald
Preceding station	Trilex	Following station
Chrastava-Andělská Hora towards Dresden Hbf	RE 2	Terminus
Liberec-Horni Ruzodol towards Děčín main	L 2	Terminus
Machnín towards Seifhennersdorf	L 7	Terminus
Preceding station	KD	Following station
Harrachov towards Szklarska Poręba Górna	D21	Terminus
Location
- Location within Czech Republic Location within Europe

Liberec railway station (Czech: Nádraží Liberec, German: Bahnhof Reichenberg) is a railway station in the city of Liberec, the capital of the Liberec Region, Czech Republic.

== History and description ==
The railway station was built in 1859 as a part of connection between Liberec and Pardubice to the south, and Zittau to the north. The project was realised by Společnost Pardubicko-liberecké dráhy (Pardubice-Liberec Railway Company). In 1900 the station area had to be improved because of a new line to Česká Lípa. A second large reconstruction was completed in 2009–11.

All five platforms are equipped with elevators and audiovisual information systems. Daily express trains link Liberec with Děčín, Ústí nad Labem, Hradec Králové and Pardubice, but there is no direct connection to Prague. The private company Die Länderbahn run services branded Trilex which connect Liberec with Zittau and Dresden.

Other frequented stations in the city are Liberec-Horní Růžodol on line 086 and Liberec-Rochlice on line 036.

== Services ==
The station is served by two express routes operated by Czech Railways.
