= Die Länderbahn =

German rail transport company

Die Länderbahn GmbH
- Industry: Transport
- Headquarters: Viechtach, Germany
- Products: Rail transport
- Owner: Netinera
- Number of employees: 140
- Website: Die Länderbahn

Die Länderbahn GmbH (Note: GmbH stands for Gesellschaft mit beschränkter Haftung, which means "company with limited liability".) (German pronunciation: [diː ˈlɛndɐˌbaːn], lit. 'The States Railway', abbr. DLB), formerly Vogtlandbahn GmbH (German pronunciation: [ˈfoːktlantˌbaːn], lit. 'Vogtland Railway'), is a German rail transport company based in Viechtach, operating transport services originally only in the Vogtland, but now also on a regional basis. Die Länderbahn is a subsidiary of Regentalbahn AG, which is owned by Ferrovie dello Stato subsidiary Netinera (formerly Arriva Deutschland). The term vogtlandbahn remains in use as a trademark of Die Länderbahn in Vogtland.

Die Länderbahn is a member of the Tarifverband der Bundeseigenen und Nichtbundeseigenen Eisenbahnen in Deutschland (Tariff association of federally-owned and non-federally-owned railways in Germany, TBNE).

== Origins ==
After German Reunification in 1990, there was a sharp drop in passenger numbers on the rail network in all the new Bundesländer. Saxony, and thus Vogtland, was no exception. The railways had old rolling stock and could not compete with rapidly improving roads. The Saxon government invested in an attempt to improve the attractiveness of the Zwickau–Falkenstein–Klingenthal line and the Herlasgrün–Falkenstein–Adorf (timetable route 539). The track was relaid to an 80 km/h standard, disabled access was facilitated at all stations and new stations opened. Maintenance and tracks were rationalised. Some platforms were removed, some stations such as Schöneck were restyled as halts.

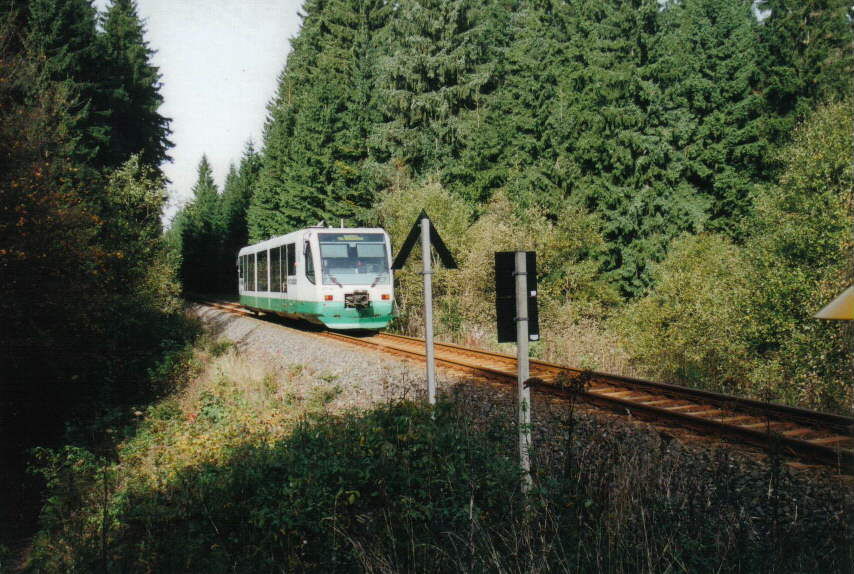
A Vogtlandbahn RegioSprinter near the Schöneck Ferienpark halt.

One component of the project model was the reallocation of the public transport services within the framework of a competitive environment. In addition to new vehicles, timetables and optimised transfer connections between the transport modes were required. In response to an invitation to tender published in September 1994, the contract was won by Regental-Bahnbetriebs-GmbH from Viechtach, Bavaria. After the completion of the redevelopment measures, operations started on 23 November 1997. On 1 January 1998, Vogtlandbahn was acquired by Regental-Bahnbetriebs-GmbH and operated as an independent company under the umbrella of the Länderbahn group. In contrast to the trains formerly operated by Deutsche Bahn, services have been well used since Vogtlandbahn took over the company. Therefore, it began construction of its own locomotive depot in Neumark in the spring of 1998, which was opened after two years of construction on 4 July 2000. The locomotive depot in Reichenbach that had been used previously was no longer needed.

=== "Zwickau Model" ===
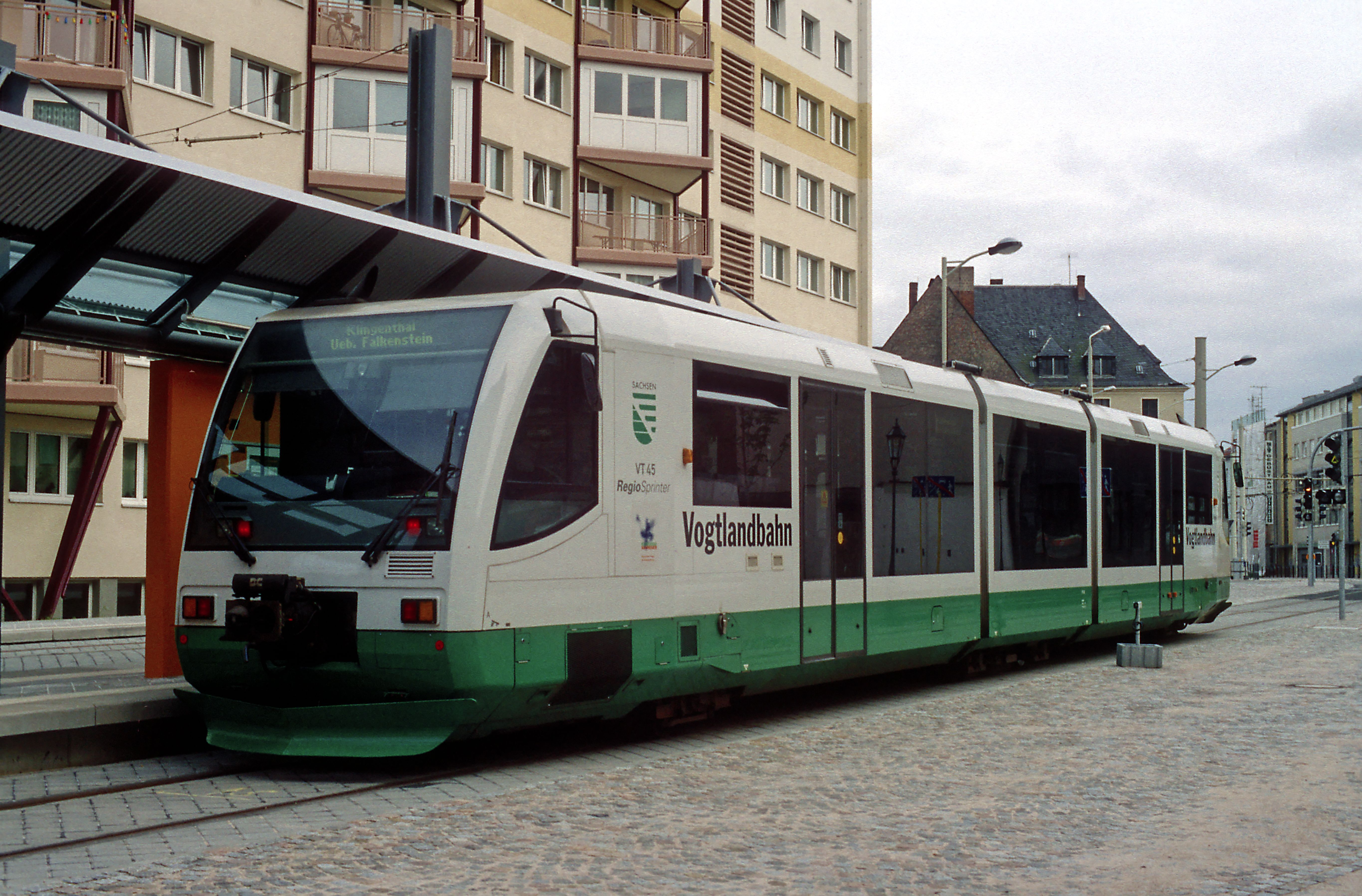
VT 45 railcar with BO-Strab equipment at the end of the line in central Zwickau

A further success is the extension of the network into Zwickau town centre. Following the example set by the Karlsruhe Stadtbahn, the lines extend from Zwickau Hauptbahnhof to the central markets. As most of the Vogtland network has not been electrified, the train-trams do not use current from the tram wires (as in Karlsruhe) but are driven by diesel engines. Between the Hauptbahnhof and Stadthall there was a link that could be reactivated. From there to Zentrum the train and the tram use the same tracks. To do this, dual-gauge track has been laid; there are three rails, the tram uses metre gauge 1,000 mm (3 ft 3 3/8 in), and the Vogtlandbahn uses standard gauge, 1,435 mm (4 ft 8 1/2 in). An extra rail was laid next to the tram line so that they share one rail and each use one of the others as appropriate. Since the tramway was only built at this time, a third track and a larger distance between the tracks could be planned from the start, making the retrofitting possible. The diesel sets run on the common route under BOStrab procedures, so they were equipped with indicators and brake lights. Because of their breadth, however, they do not operate with road traffic; Äußere Schneeberger Straße is largely closed to car traffic. However, the area used by the tracks can be used by rescue vehicles and rail replacement buses.

=== Expansion outside of Saxony ===
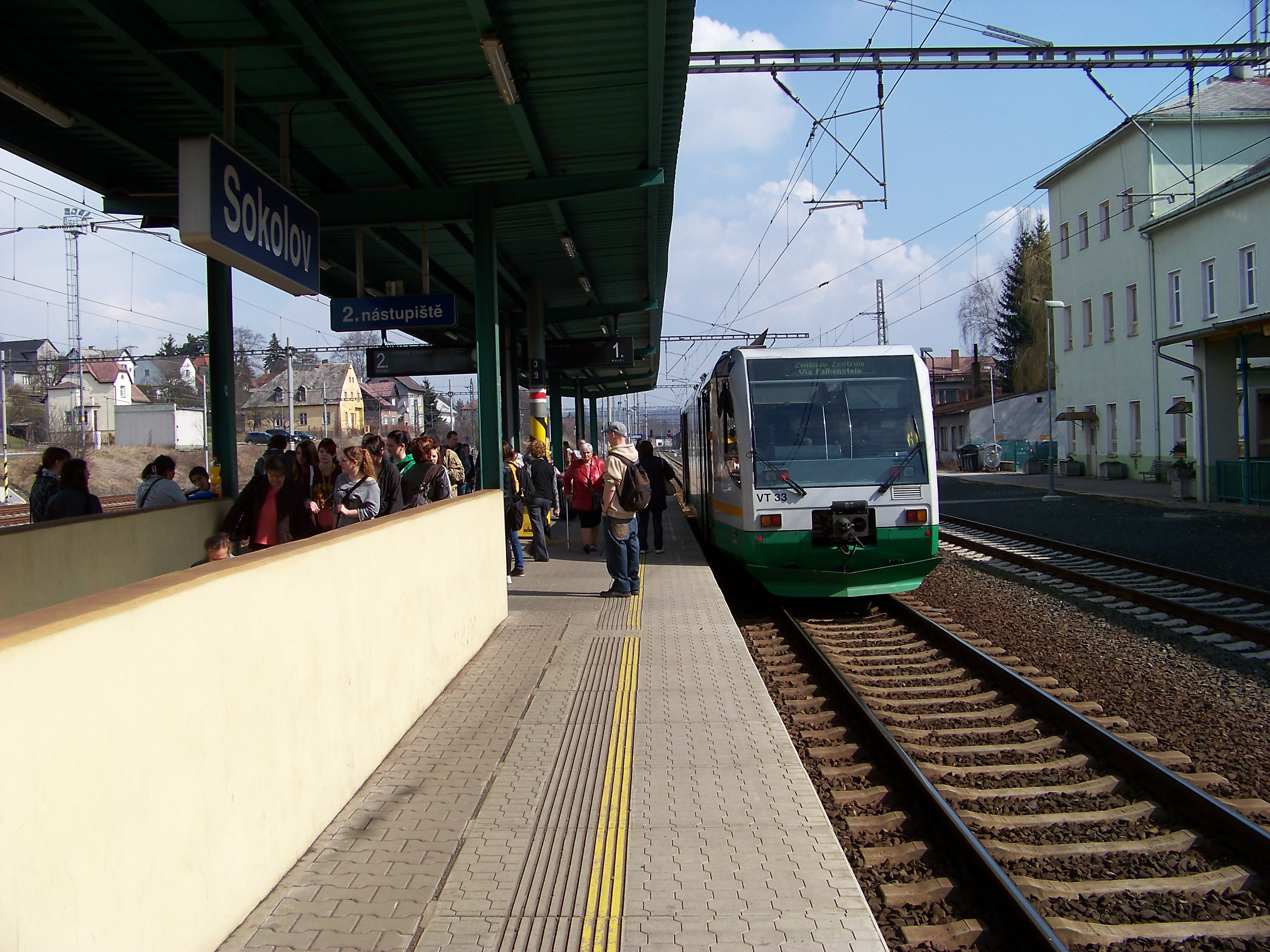
RegioSprinter in Sokolov, since 2003 the southern end of the line

In the years that followed Vogtlandbahn had many opportunities to bid for further routes to expand its network. From their core routes in the Vogtland they moved over into Bavaria and Thuringia, with lines to Hof, Schleiz and Gera. When the Czech Republic became a candidate for European Union membership a new market opened. In 2000, after a 55-year gap, the Zwickau–Klingenthal line was reconnected to Kraslice (Graslitz). In 2003 it connected to Sokolov (Falkenau) on the Czech Chomutov–Cheb railway.

On 14 December 2003, Vogtlandbahn secured an agreement with DB Regio AG to use the Gera–Weida–Zeulenroda–Mehltheuer line and thus started a general traffic service on the Elstertalbahn between Gera, Greiz and Weischlitz, which previously had required a change. Following the extension of the Zwickau–Plauen–Bad Brambach line over the Czech border to Cheb (German: Eger) and thus Marktredwitz in Bavaria, the Plauen-Hof service was extended through Marktredwitz and Weiden (10 June 2001) to Regensburg (15 December 2002).

At the timetable change on 8 December 2006, Vogtlandbahn had to give up the operation of a service for the first time. Traffic had not increased between Schönberg and Schleiz, so that the Thuringian local transport authority was not willing to extend the contract for the operation. There was no connection with the reduction in the support for regionalisation measures, which had been decided a few months earlier, since the end of the service was already anticipated. On the other hand, Vogtlandbahn would gain new services in the north-east of Bavaria. Vogtlandbahn operated Regionalbahn services on behalf of DB Regio Nordostbayern from December 2006 until the takeover of the Dieselnetz Oberfranken (upper Fancononia diesel network) by agilis in June 2011 on the (Hof –) Münchberg–Helmbrechts and Lichtenfels–Neuenmarkt-Wirsberg routes, partly together with Deutsche Bahn, but also by itself.

=== Sale ===
Finally, in autumn 2004 Bavaria sold its final stake in the Länderbahn to the British-owned Arriva group, who already owned the Prignitz railway in Brandenburg. This made them the second largest railway company in Germany. After Arriva was bought by Deutsche Bahn in 2010, the business had to be resold to preserve competition. The new owners were the Italian state railways (Ferrovie dello Stato) together with Luxembourg infrastructure fund Cube. The German parent company has been called Netinera since March 2011.

=== Re-tender ===
The core network of Vogtlandbahn in the Vogtlandkreis, west Saxony and east Thuringia was re-tendered by the transport authority in the spring of 2010. The tendered Vogtland network includes the Hof–Falkenstein–Adorf, Mariánské Lázne–Plauen ob Bf–Zwickau Zentrum, Weischlitz–Gera and Zwickau Zentrum–Kraslice lines with an annual 3.16 million train-kilometres. Vogtlandbahn won the contract in September 2010, so the traffic in the Vogtland will continue to be operated by this company from December 2012 to December 2027. Regio-Shuttles, Desiros and RegioSprinters are used for these operations. The brand name in the core network is vogtlandbahn (in lower case), despite the renaming of the company as Die Länderbahn.

At the timetable change on 8 December 2012, scheduled services ended between Zwotental and Adorf, which had recently only operated on weekends.

== Network ==
In the current timetable, many lines are operated by the Länderbahn (under the brand names of vogtlandbahn, alex, waldbahn, oberpfalzbahn and trilex):

Between Zwickau, Falkenstein and Klingenthal, Kraslice, as well as between Falkenstein and Plauen, the trains usually operate hourly. On weekends, services on these sections of line, operate every two hours.

Since the timetable change on 14 December 2014, services of the Länderbahn operate on the Dresden–Görlitz and Dresden–Zittau (–Liberec) lines. These routes were previously operated by DB Regio Südost. In March 2014, ZVON announced that Länderbahn would operate these services as part so-called Ostsachsennetz (East Saxon Network) under the brand name of Trilex. The Regional-Express lines have since been designated as TLX1 and 2 and the Regionalbahn lines have been designated as TL60 and 61. The previous Trilex line has since been called TL70.

Lines VB 3 and VB 8 have been operated since the timetable change of 14 December 2014 by the associated company, Regentalbahn, which won the Regionalzüge Ostbayern contract of the Bayerische Eisenbahngesellschaft in 2011.

The Trilex lines have been changed since the timetable change in December 2016 again with the original lines designated as RE1, RE2, RB60 and RB61. The former line designated as TL70 received at this time the line designation of L7.

At the timetable change of 11 December 2016, Vogtlandbahn renamed the VL 1, VL 2, VL 4, VL 5 services as RB 1, RB 2, RB 4 and RB 5.

Line	Route	Distance	Stations	Start date
RB 1	Zwickau Zentrum–Zwickau (Sachs) Hbf–Lengenfeld–Auerbach–Falkenstein–Zwotental–Klingenthal–Kraslice	73 km	23	Zwickau Hbf–Klingenthal: 23 November 1997; Zwickau Zentrum–Zwickau Hbf: 28 May 1999; Klingenthal–Kraslice: 28 May 2000
RB 2	Zwickau Zentrum–Zwickau (Sachs) Hbf (–Werdau)–Reichenbach ob Bf–Plauen (Vogtl) ob Bf (— Hof Hbf)–Bad Brambach–Cheb	125 km	23/33	Zwickau Hbf–Plauen (Vogtl) ob Bf: 13 October 1996; Plauen (Vogtl) Mitte–Hof Hbf: 28 May 2000
RB 4	Gera Hbf–Greiz–Elsterberg–Plauen (Vogtl) Mitte–Weischlitz–Plauen (Vogtl) ob Bf–Adorf (Vogtl)	62 km	16/18	Partial: 1 July 2002; Complete: 14 December 2003
RB 5	Mehltheuer–Plauen (Vogtl) ob Bf–Herlasgrün–Auerbach–Falkenstein–Zwotental–Klingenthal–Kraslice	78 km	21/22	Plauen (Vogtl) ob Bf–Falkenstein: 23 November 1997

== Rolling stock ==
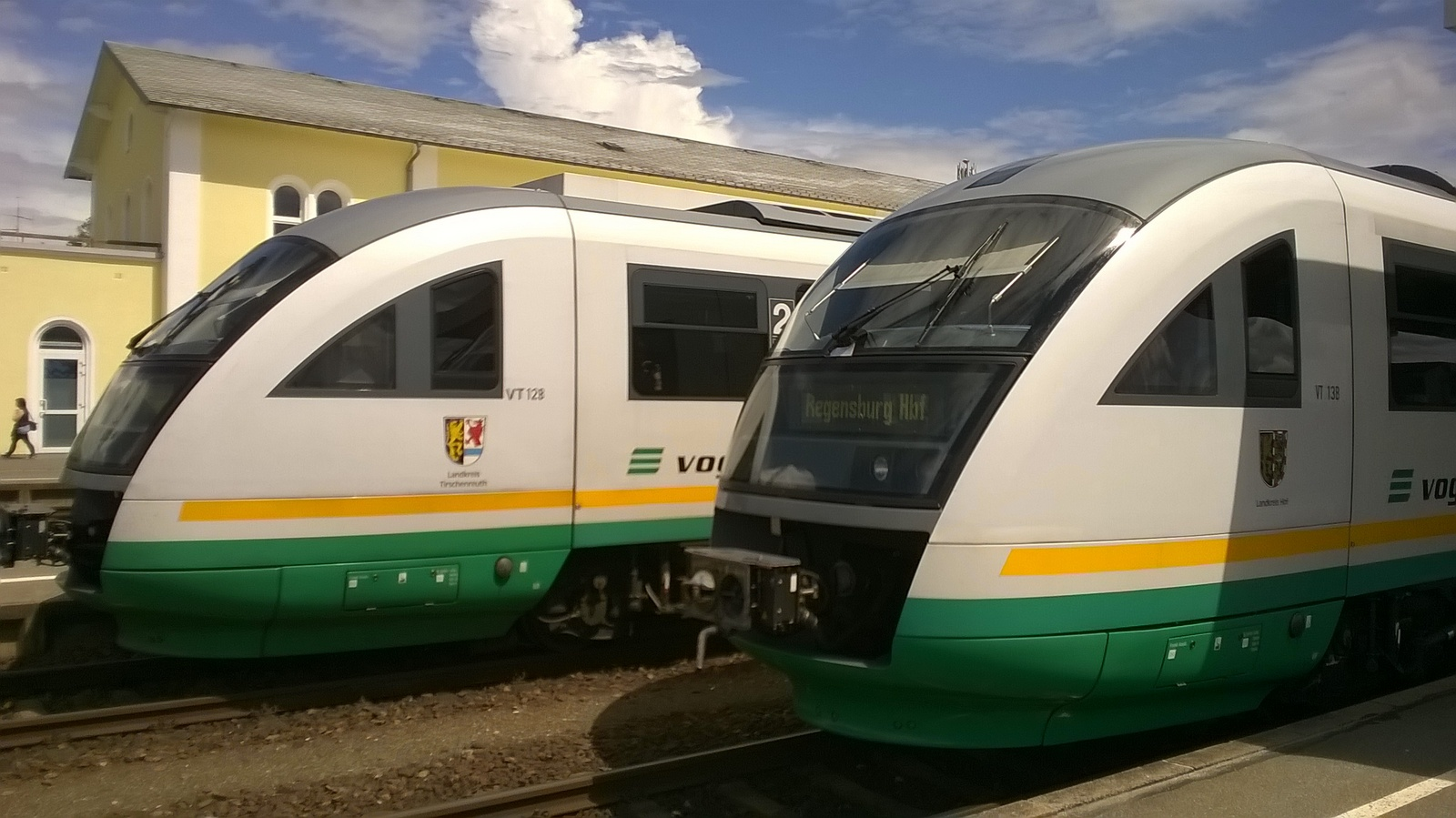
Siemens Desiro diesel multiple units VT 12 and VT 13 of the Vogtlandbahn in Schwandorf

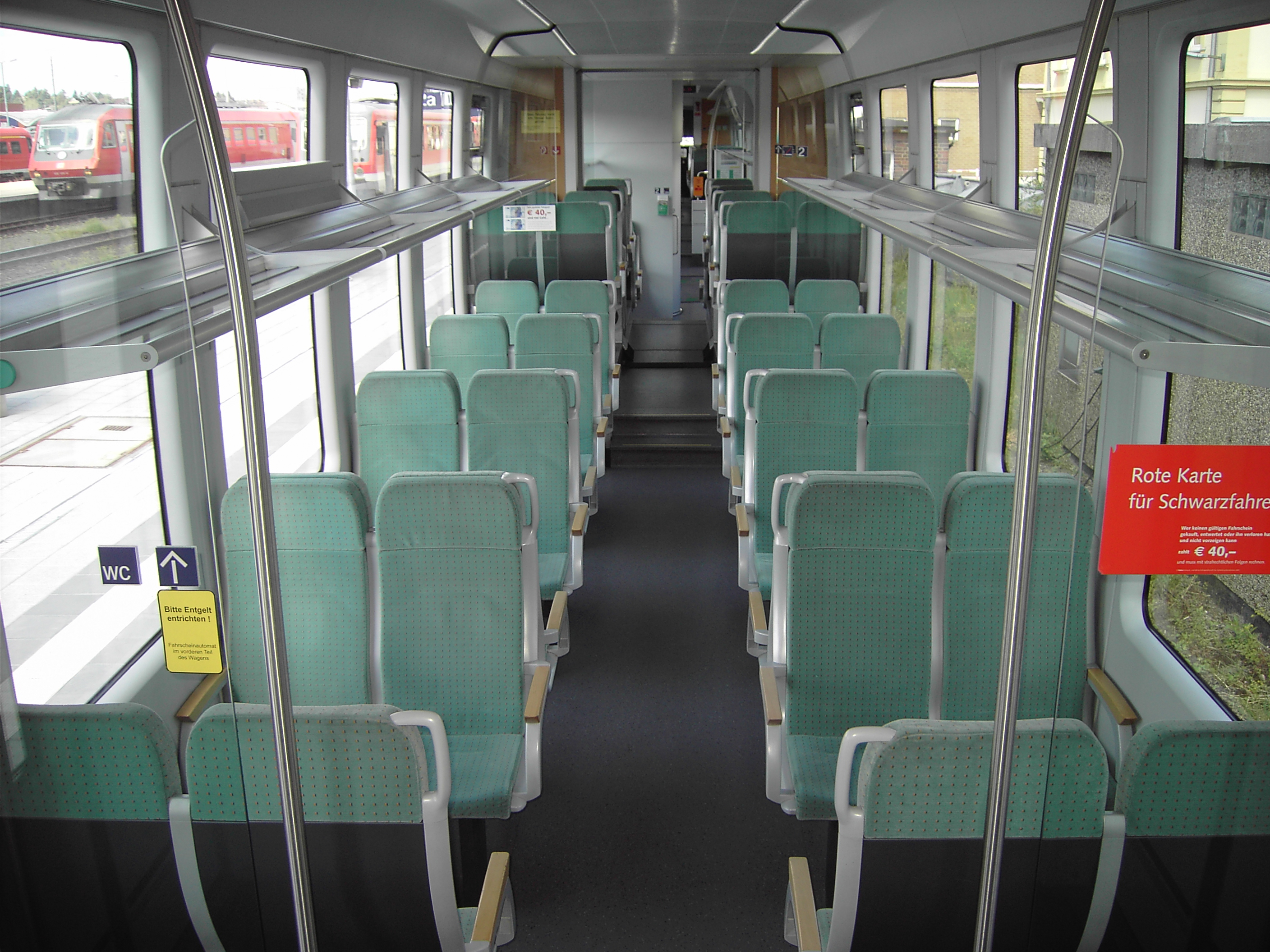
Interior of a Vogtlandbahn Desiro

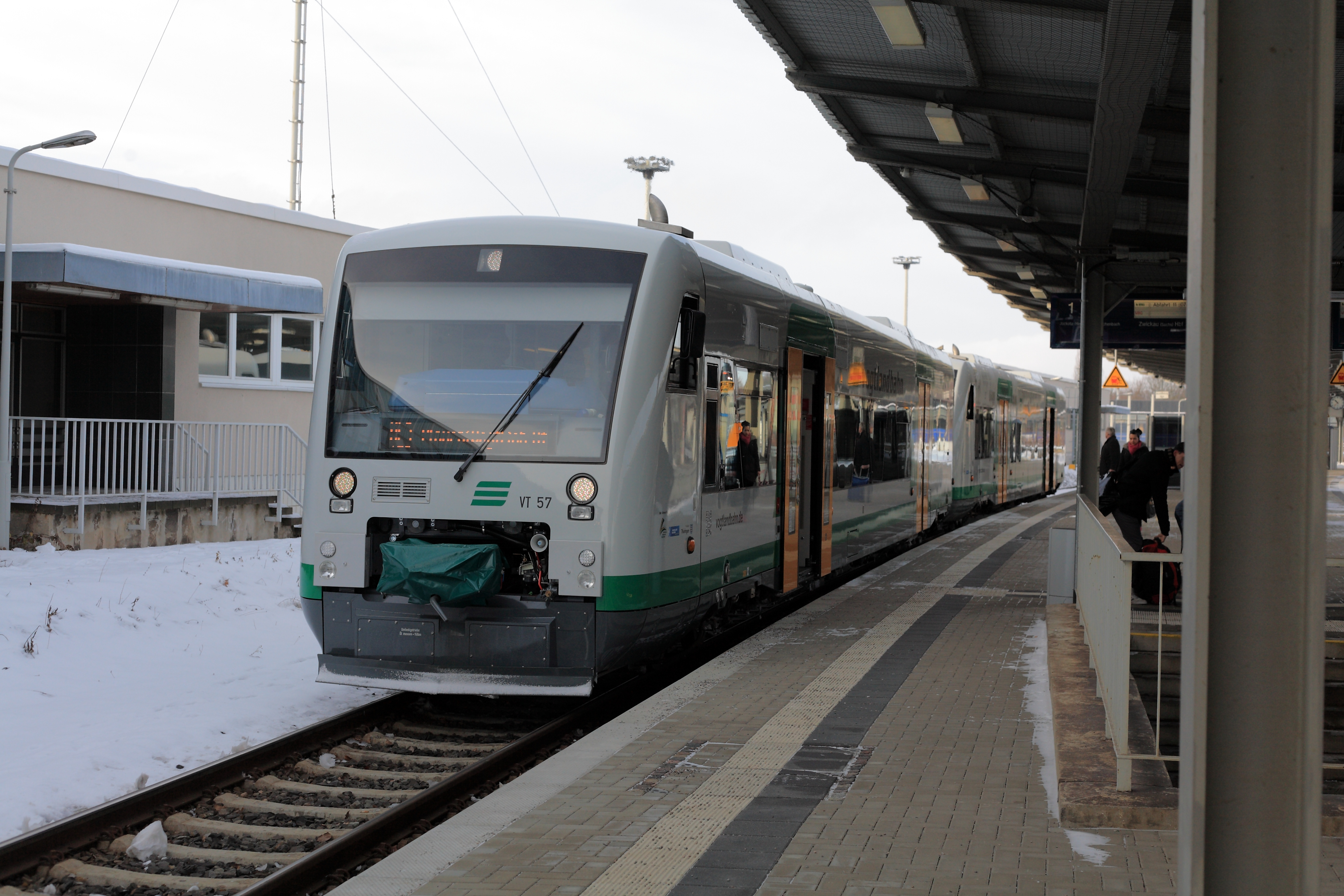
Coupled sets of RegioShuttles in Plauen station

The company decided in the beginning to use RegioSprinter class of railcars from Duewag that had already been ordered by Dürener Kreisbahn. This was originally a series of 6 and then a further series of 10 were ordered. Between 1998 and 1999, the second series were rebuilt so they could be used on the Zwickau train-tram lines, for example: brakelights, indicators and warning bells were needed. They needed switch equipment to activate the traffic lights to ensure a safe uninterrupted passage. In January 2004 the rest were converted. RegioSprinters were only suitable for short journeys, they had thinly upholstered seats in a 2+3 formation and no toilets, their top speed was 100 km/h, though later all the trains crossing the Czech border were refitted to a higher standard. RegioSprinters were used on VB 1, VB 5 and VB 2 lines and until December 2006 on VB 7, the line from Schönberg to Schleiz. Two of these trains were lent on a long term basis to the Prignitzer Eisenbahn for use around Oberhausen.

As the network expanded and trains were needed for longer journeys, 9 trains of the Desiro Classic class were bought in 2000 from Siemens Transportation Systems. These are classified by Deutsche Bahn as class 642. These were comfortable trains with good upholstery with seat in a 2+2 formation, in the first class compartment the seats were in a 1+2 formation. Desiros were fitted with on-board ticket machines and ski racks. A second series of 15 were ordered in 2002. The first series were fitted with two 275 kW motors and the second series had two 315 kW motors and wheelchair friendly access. Desiros are scheduled to run on lines VB 3, VB 3, VB 4, half of operations on VB 2 and on the Trilex lines.

New Stadler Regio-Shuttle RS1 diesel multiple units began to be delivered from February 2012 to renew the vehicle fleet. The locomotives met the requirements of the BOStrab regulations, in order to be able to serve the line to central Zwickau. Eight new traction units were put into operation at the timetable change on 9 December 2012. Four Regio-Shuttles were also acquired from Ostdeutsche Eisenbahn in 2015, which were used by Trilex on line TL70 at the time.

== Other brands ==
=== Trilex ===
Trilex logo

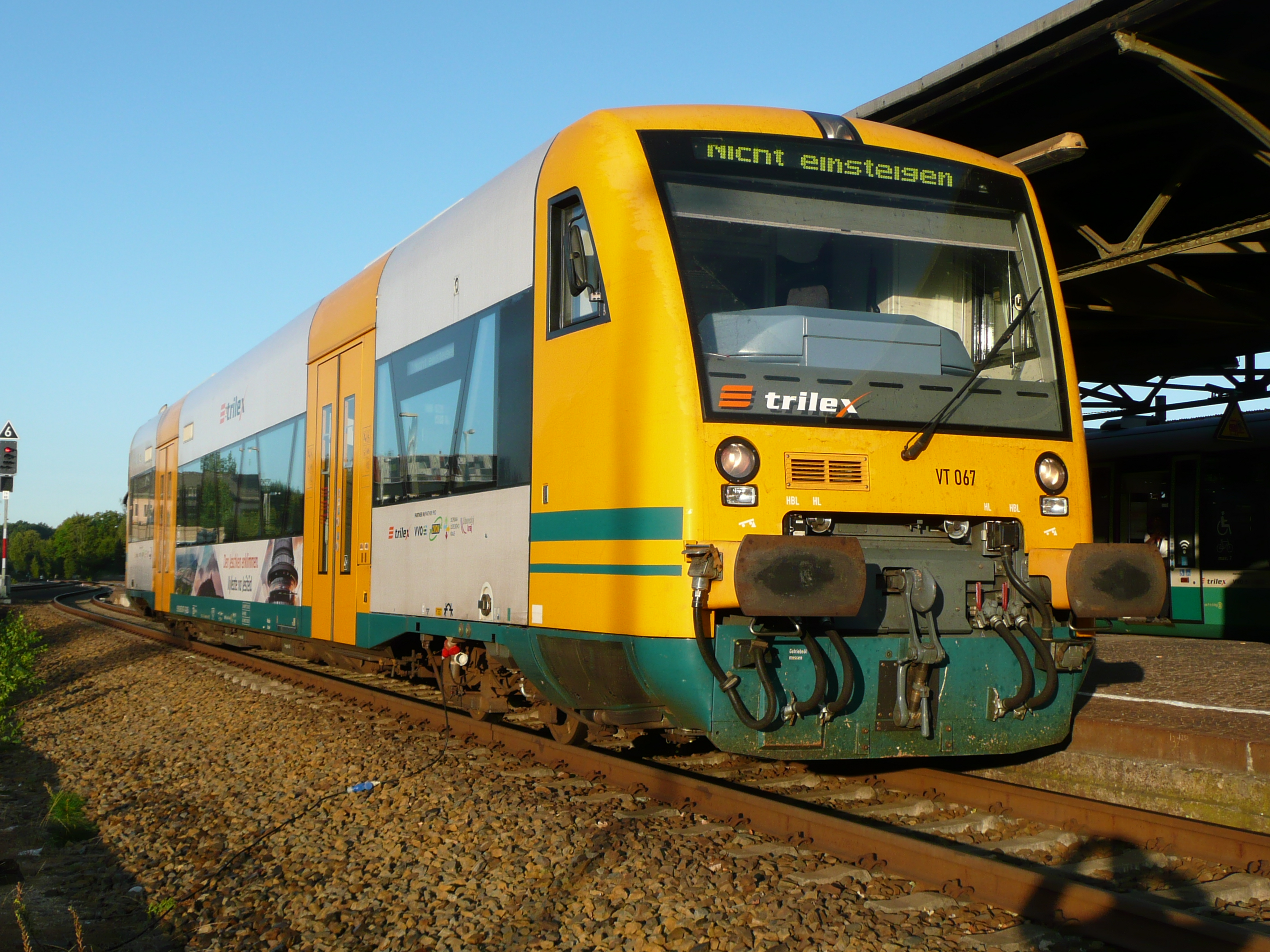
Trilex Regio-Shuttle at Bischofswerda

Länderbahn has operated the Liberec–Zittau–Varnsdorf–Rybniště/Seifhennersdorf lines in the Germany/Poland/Czechia corner since 12 December 2010. Siemens Desiro Classic and Regio-Shuttle rolling stock are used, and some are staffed with bilingual conductors.

Since the timetable change in December 2014, the Länderbahn has also operated the Dresden–Bischofswerda–Bautzen–Görlitz and Dresden–Bischofswerda–Zittau–Liberec lines of the so-called Ostsachsennetzes (East Saxon network) under the brand name of trilex. These are operated exclusively with Desiro sets. Individual services are operated to Wrocław in cooperation with DB Regio.

Line	Route	Distance	Stations	Start date
RE 1	Dresden Hbf–Bischofswerda–Bautzen–Löbau–Görlitz (–Wrocław Główny); Individual trains continue to Wrocław Główny (Dresden-Wrocław-Express)	105 km	10	14 December 2014
RE 2	Dresden Hbf–Bischofswerda–Zittau (–Liberec)	105/132 km	13/19	14 December 2014
RB 60	Dresden Hbf–Bischofswerda–Bautzen–Löbau–Görlitz	105 km	23	14 December 2014
RB 61	Dresden Hbf–Bischofswerda–Zittau	105 km	28	14 December 2014
L 2	Liberec – Česká Lípa – Děčín St. n.	about 70 km	14	11 December 2022
L 4	Rumburk – Ceska Lipa – Mlada Boleslav mesto	99 km	22	12 December 2021
L 7	Liberec–Zittau–Varnsdorf–Rybniště/ Seifhennersdorf (Mittelherwigsdorf–Varnsdorf–Eibau railway)	56/50 km	16	12 December 2010

=== alex ===
alex logo

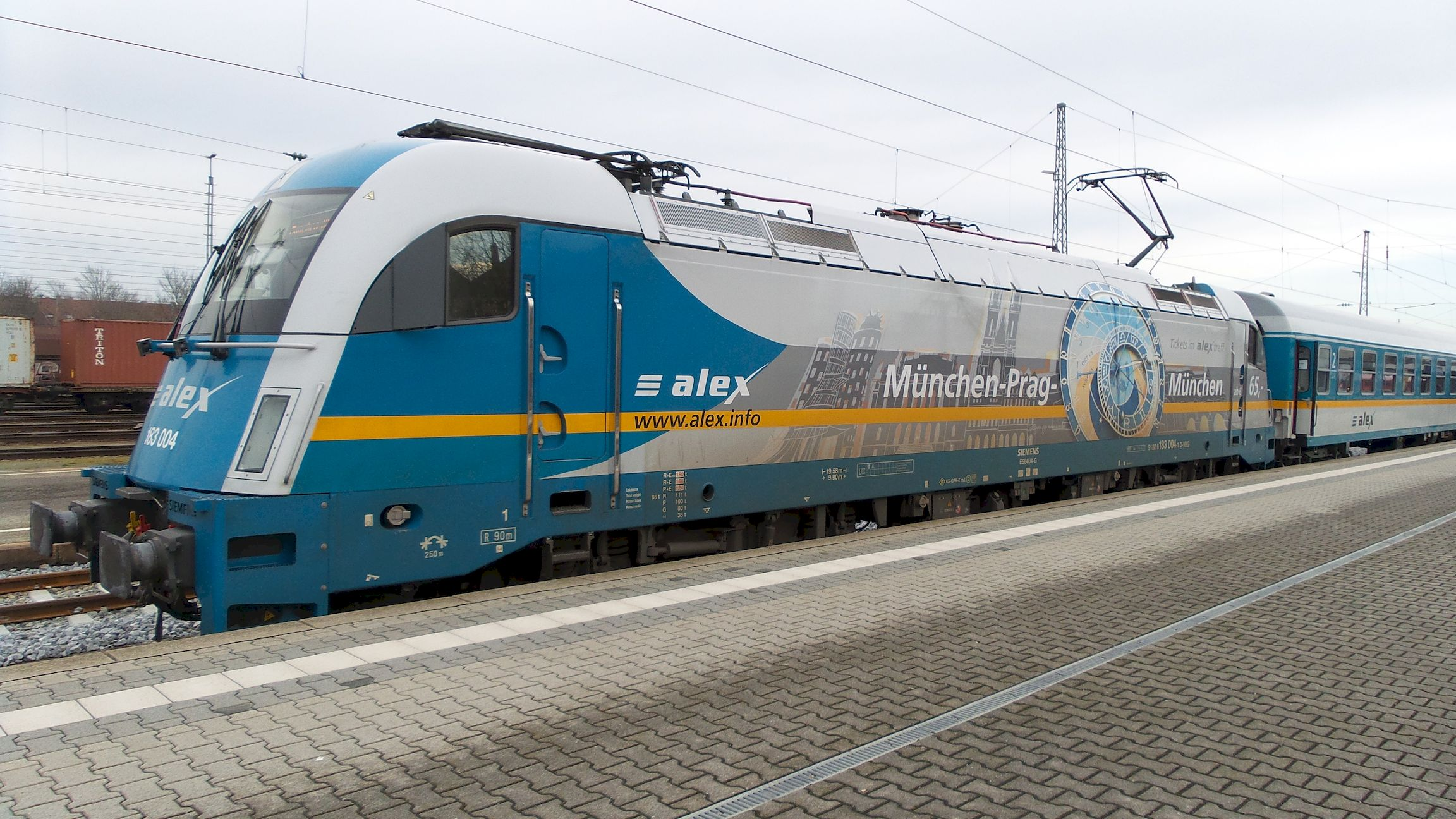
Alex 183-004 in Landshut Hbf

As a result of a tender called in 2005 by the Bayerische Eisenbahngesellschaft, a contract was awarded to Länderbahn in October 2005 for the operation of the service branded as the Arriva-Länderbahn-Express. The tender specification included a regionalen Schnellverkehr (regional fast train) at two-hour intervals from Munich via Regensburg to Schwandorf, from where trains continue every four hours alternatively to Hof or Furth im Wald. Länderbahn was also able to tender for the continuation of services on the Munich–Kempten–Oberstdorf/Lindau route, which they had already operated together with the Swiss SBB GmbH since December 2003 under the brand name of Allgäu-Express.

For the new services, Vogtlandbahn purchased 90 used passenger coaches, 60 of which were modernised in Halberstadt and Neumünster. Since the 2009 timetable change, seven double-deck coaches have been based in Bautzen. Eleven diesel locomotives of class 223 (EuroRunner), built by Siemens, are leased from the company Alpha Trains for the haulage of the trains between Oberstdorf/Lindau and Munich and between Regensburg and Hof/Plzeň. An additional four locomotives of Siemens class ES64U4 were leased for the electrified Munich–Regensburg section and classified as class 183. These trains are all based in the new plant of the Länderbahn in Schwandorf. Since the takeover by Netinera, the service is marketed simply as alex. Länderbahn lost the concession for the Munich–Kempten–Oberstdorf/Lindau route from December 2020.

Line	Route	Distance	Stations	Start date
RE 2 RE 25	Munich Hbf–Landshut Hbf–Regensburg Hbf–Schwandorf – / Weiden–Marktredwitz–Hof Hbf / Furth im Wald–Plzeň–Prague	318/443 km	16/16	9 December 2007

=== Oberpfalzbahn ===
Oberpfalzbahn logo

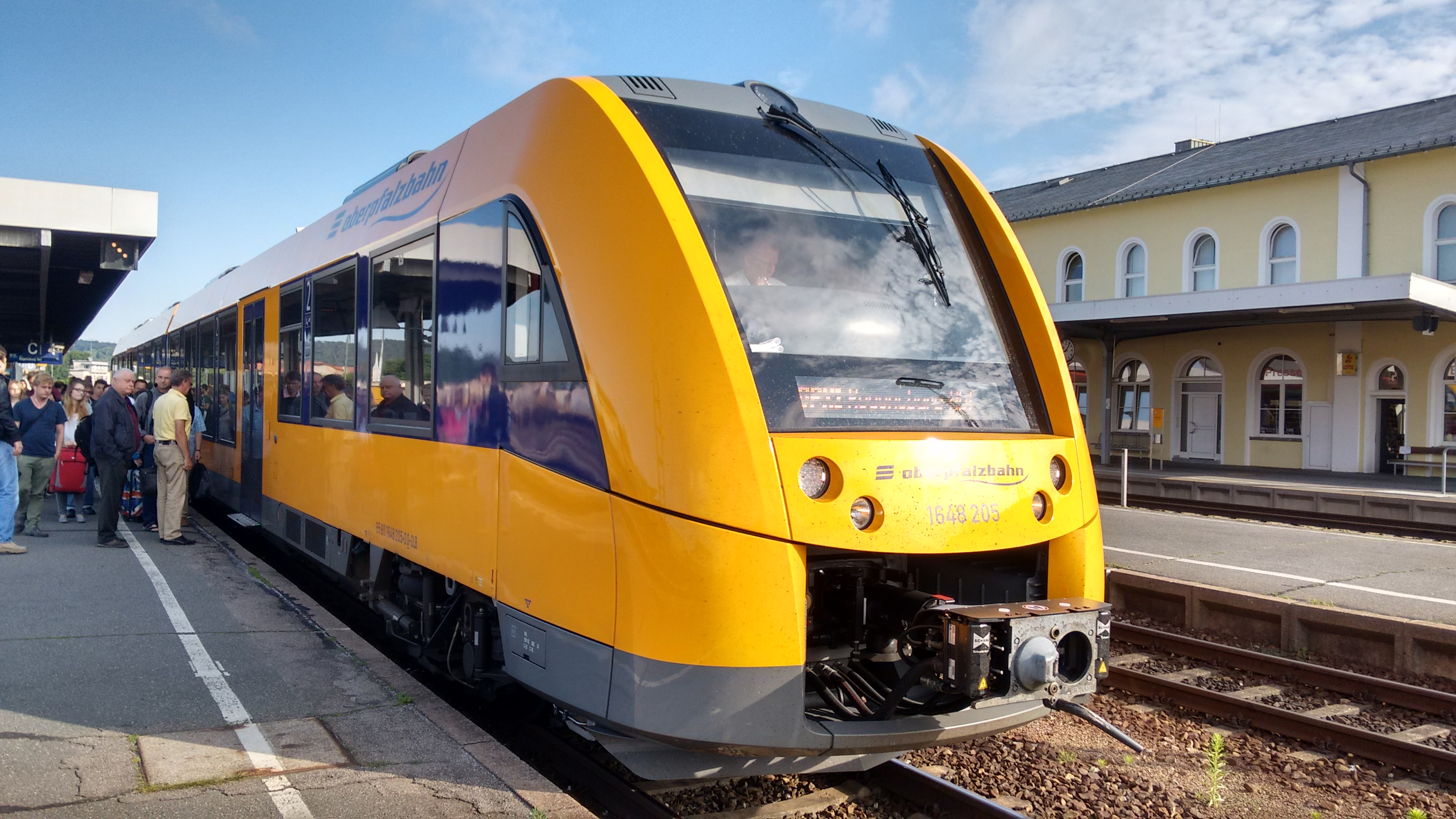
Alstom Coradia LINT 41 1648-205 in Schwandorf

Länderbahn operates five services in eastern Bavaria between Hof, Schwandorf, Regensburg, Waldmünchen, Furth im Wald and Lam under the brand name of Oberpfalzbahn (German pronunciation: [ˈoːbɐˌpfaltsbaːn], lit. 'Upper Palatinate Railway'). With Cheb and Domažlice as well as some smaller halts, Czech stations are also connected to the main line network.

The Oberpfalzbahn was launched with eleven Stadler Regio-Shuttle RS1 railcars in the summer of 2001. The fleet was supplemented in 2013 with two used railcars of the same type. Polish Pesa Link railcars were originally planned to operate the Regensburg–Marktredwitz railway. Due to problems with gaining a licence to operate, this order was canceled. Instead, LINT 41 railcars have been used since 9 March 2013.

Line	Route	Distance	Stations	Start date
RE 23 RB 23	Marktredwitz – Weiden (Oberpf) – Schwandorf – Regensburg Hbf	137 km	6/18	14 December 2014
RB 95	Marktredwitz – Cheb – Aš – Selb-Ploessberg – Hof Hbf	89 km	16	14 December 2014
RB 27	Schwandorf – Cham (Oberpf) – Furth im Wald (– Domažlice)	67 km	10/14	
RB 28	Cham (Oberpf) – Bad Kötzing – Lam	40 km	13	
RB 29	Cham (Oberpf) – Waldmünchen	22km	8	

=== Waldbahn ===
Waldbahn logo

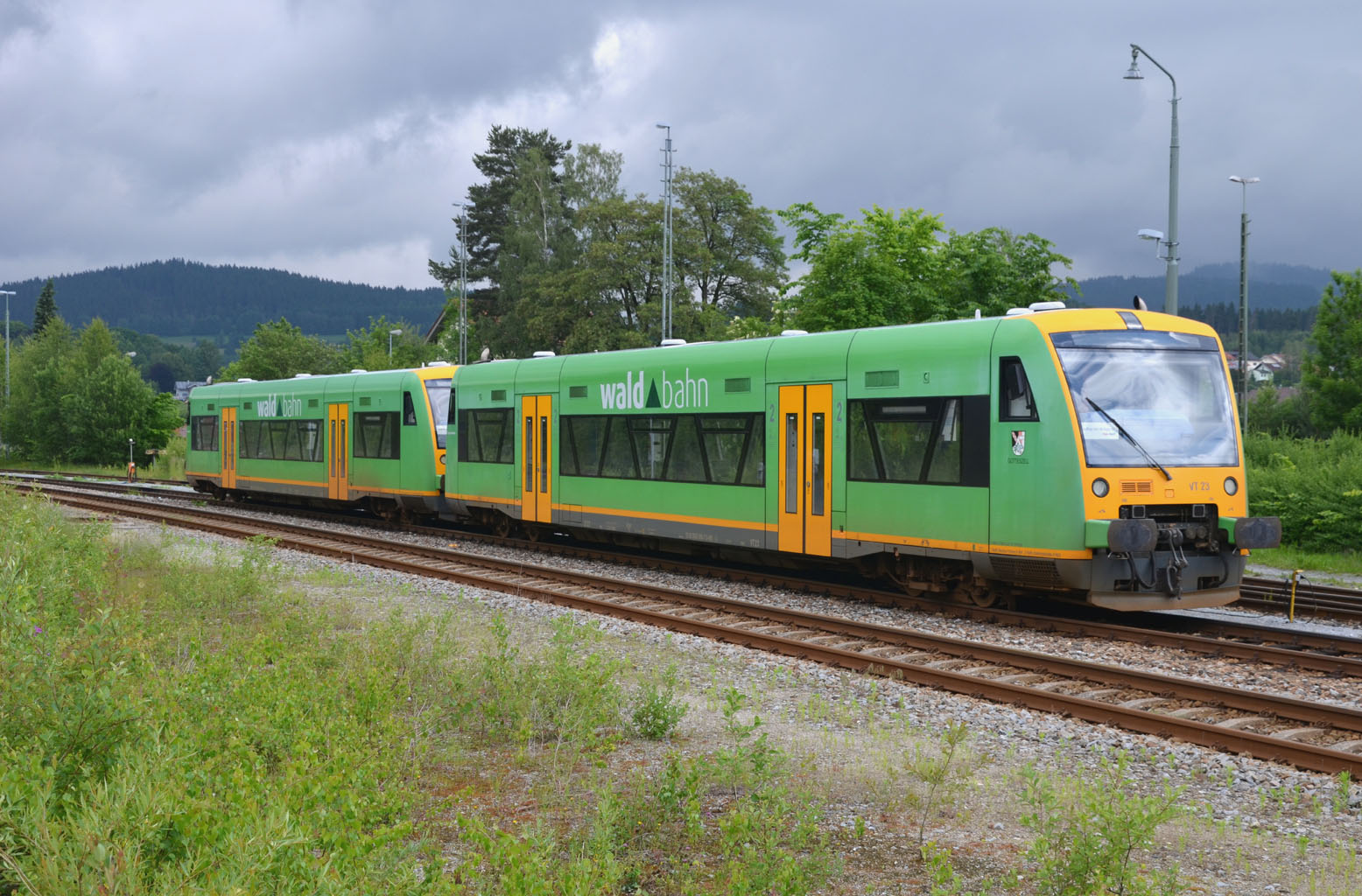
Stadler Regio-Shuttles RS1 in Zwiesel

Länderbahn operates four services in the Zwiesel region in the Bavarian Forest (Bayerischer Wald) under the brand name of Waldbahn (German pronunciation: [ˈvaltˌbaːn], lit. 'Forest Railway'): Plattling–Bayerisch Eisenstein, Zwiesel–Grafenau and Zwiesel–Bodenmais, as well as Gotteszell–Viechtach, which was reactivated in September 2016. The service to Bayerisch Eisenstein/Železná Ruda-Alžbětín station connects with Czech trains towards Prague and Pilsen.

The Waldbahn is part of the Bavarian Forest National Park transport plan and one of four reference lines of the Bayerischen Eisenbahngesellschaft (BEG). These routes are particularly studied by BEG, in order to evaluate various innovative concepts for quality improvement.

14 modernised Stadler Regio-Shuttle RS1 diesel railcars are currently under construction for the Waldbahn at the Viechtach locomotive depot.

Line	Route	Distance	Stations	Start date
RB 35	Bayerisch Eisenstein–Zwiesel (Bay)–Gotteszell–Plattling	72 km	11	15 December 2013
RB 37	Bodenmais–Zwiesel (Bay)	15 km	5	15 December 2013
RB 36	Zwiesel (Bay)–Grafenau	32 km	9	15 December 2013
RB 38	Viechtach–Gotteszell	25 km	8	12 September 2016

== Vogtland-Express ==
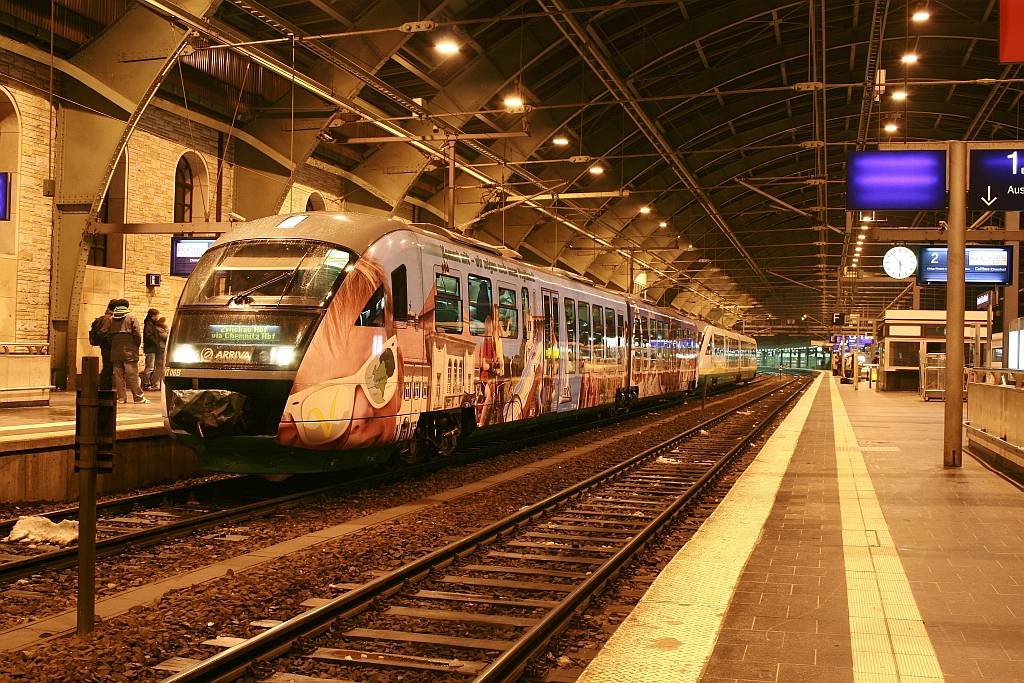
In January 2009: The Vogtland-Express only ran to Zwickau temporarily.

Vogtlandbahn provided one of a few long-distance passenger services operated by private railways in Germany between 12 June 2005 and 30 September 2012. It ran once a day from Plauen to Berlin Ostbahnhof and return. Vogtlandbahn filled a gap created by the end of the last Interregio services from the Vogtland to Berlin and therefore north-south long-distance services in the region. After several changes of the timetable, operations were temporarily discontinued for financial reasons from 16 February 2009 to 7 April 2009, but the Vogtland-Express made its last run on 8 April 2009. From January 2011, the Vogtland-Express was operated as a replacement bus service, since the Vogtlandbahn did not have any appropriate rolling stock available. The bus served the stations of Reichenbach, Zwickau, Chemnitz, Berlin-Schönefeld Flughafen and Berlin Zoologischer Garten. The Vogtland-Express was partly restored with railcars at the timetable change on 12 June 2011.

In the spring of 2012 the operating days of the service, which had initially been operated as a daily train pair, were reduced to Friday to Monday, with buses on the other days. From 1 October 2012, services of the Vogtland-Express ran daily only as long-distance coach services from Reichenbach via Zwickau, Chemnitz, Berlin Schönefeld Airport, Berlin Zoologischer Garten to Berlin central bus station at Funkturm Berlin. Finally Vogtlandbahn withdrew from the operation and from 1 October 2014, the participating bus companies operated the line, which from the summer of 2013 ran again from Plauen to Berlin, under the brand name of Vogtland-Fernbus as an independent operation. This service was stopped by the end of 2015 because of a lack of profitability.
