= List of the first German railways to 1870 =

List of the first German railways to 1870 with German railways ordered by date of the commissioning the first phase of construction. For context see History of rail transport in Germany.

Year	day month	from	to	via / date of completion and length of route / rail company
1831	20 September	Essen-Kupferdreh	Nierenhof near Langenberg	Horse drawn and narrow gauge, Prince William Railway Company. In 1847 converted to steam power and standard gauge, ca. 30 km, Wuppertal-Vohwinkel–Essen-Überruhr railway
1835	7 December	Nuremberg	Fürth	First German railway operated by steam, 6 km, Bavarian Ludwig Railway, initially 75% of trains horse drawn, 25% steam powered
1837	24 April	Leipzig	Dresden	Riesa, until 1839, 117 km, Leipzig–Dresden Railway Company, first German long-distance railway, first steam only railway in Germany, included first standard gauge rail tunnel in continental Europe
1838	22 September	Berlin	Potsdam	Zehlendorf, 26.4 km, Berlin-Potsdam-Magdeburg Railway, first steam railway in Prussia
1838	1 December	Brunswick	Harzburg	Wolfenbüttel, until 1841, 47 km, Duchy of Brunswick State Railway (first German state railway), Brunswick–Bad Harzburg railway
1838	20 December	Düsseldorf Rheinknie	Elberfeld (now Wuppertal)	Erkrath, until 1841, 26.7 km, Düsseldorf-Elberfeld Railway Company, Düsseldorf–Elberfeld railway
1839	29 June	Magdeburg	Leipzig	Cöthen, Halle, until 1840, 119 km, Magdeburg-Leipzig Railway, first line crossing more than one state
1839	2 August	Cologne	Herbesthal (national border)	Müngersdorf, Lövenich, Düren, Aachen, until 1843, 86 km, Rhenish Railway Company, Cologne–Aachen line
1839	1 September	Munich	Augsburg	Until 1840, 62 km, Munich–Augsburg Railway Company, Munich–Augsburg line
1839	26 September	Frankfurt am Main	Wiesbaden	Höchst, Kastel, until 1840, 44 km, Taunus line
1840	1 September	Berlin	Köthen	Wittenberg, Dessau, until 1841, 153 km, Berlin-Anhalt Railway Company, Berlin–Wittenberg, Wittenberg–Dessau, Dessau–Köthen lines
1840	12 September	Mannheim	Haltingen	Karlsruhe, Freiburg, until 1851, 285 km, Grand Duchy of Baden State Railway, until 1855 1,600 mm (5 ft 3 in) gauge, Rhine Valley Railway
1842	7 May	Hamburg	Bergedorf	16.5 km, Hamburg-Bergedorf Railway Company
1842	1 August	Berlin	Szczecin	Until 1843, 135 km, Berlin-Stettin Railway
1842	19 September	Leipzig	Hof (Saale)	Reichenbach, Werdau, until 1851, 165 km, Saxon-Bavarian Railway, from 1847 Royal Saxon State Railways
1842	23 October	Berlin	Frankfurt (Oder)	81 km, Berlin-Frankfurt (Oder) Railway
1843	10 July	Wolfenbüttel	Oschersleben	Jerxheim, 52 km, Duchy of Brunswick State Railway, Wolfenbüttel–Helmstedt line, Oschersleben–Jerxheim line
1843	15 July	Magdeburg	Halberstadt	Oschersleben, 58 km, Magdeburg-Halberstadt Railway Company, Magdeburg–Thale line
1843	22 October	Hanover	Brunswick	Lehrte, Peine, until 1844, 61 km, Royal Hanoverian State Railways, Duchy of Brunswick State Railway, Hanover–Brunswick line
1844	15 February	Cologne-Klettenberg	Rolandseck	Brühl, Bonn, until 1856, 45 km, Bonn-Cologne Railway Company, Bonn-Cologne line
1844	18 September	Altona	Kiel	106 km, Altona-Kiel Railway Company, Hamburg-Altona–Kiel line
1844	1 October	Hof	Lindau	Nuremberg, Kempten, until 1853, 548 km, Ludwig South-North Railway, Royal Bavarian State Railways
1844	19 October	Frankfurt (Oder)	Wrocław	Legnica, Bolesławiec, until 1846, 277 km, Lower Silesian-Markish Railway
1845	20 July	Elmshorn	Glückstadt	17 km, Glückstadt-Elmshorn Railway Company, Marsh Railway (extended to Itzehoe on 15 October 1857)
1845	18 September	Neumünster	Rendsburg	34 km, Rendsburg-Neumünster Railway Company
1845	15 October	Lehrte	Celle	28 km, Royal Hanoverian State Railways, Lehrte–Celle line
1845	22 October	Bruchsal	Friedrichshafen	Stuttgart, Ulm, until 1853, 275 km, Royal Württemberg State Railways, Fils Valley line, Western Railway, Southern Railway
1845	17 November	Dresden	Görlitz	Löbau, Bautzen, until 1847, 102 km, Saxon-Silesian Railway Company (built together with branch from Löbau to Zittau, opened 1848, 34 km)
1845	20 December	Cologne-Deutz	Minden	Duisburg, Dortmund, until 1847, 263 km, Cologne-Minden Railway Company, Cologne-Minden trunk line
1846	6 June	Halle (Saale)	Gerstungen	Weißenfels, Erfurt, Eisenach, in parts till 1849, 211 km, Thuringian Railway Company (from Gerstungen Frederick William Northern Railway Company), Thuringian line
1846	12 June	Lehrte	Nordstemmen	Hildesheim, until 1853, 36.1 km, Royal Hanoverian State Railways, Lehrte–Nordstemmen line
1846	22 June	Frankfurt am Main	Heidelberg	Darmstadt, 88 km, Main-Neckar Railway
1846	7 August	Potsdam	Magdeburg	Brandenburg, 117 km, Berlin-Potsdam-Magdeburg Railway
1846	30 August	Köthen	Bernburg	21 km, Anhalt-Köthen-Bernburg Railway Company, extended to Aschersleben and Wegeleben (47 km) in 1865, Köthen–Aschersleben, Halle–Halberstadt lines
1846	15 October	Berlin	Bergedorf	268 km, Berlin-Hamburg Railway Company
1847	1 May	Hagenow	Rostock	Schwerin, Bad Kleinen, Bützow, including branch from Bützow to Güstrow, until 1850, 105 km, Mecklenburg Railway Company, Hagenow Land–Schwerin, Ludwigslust–Wismar, Bad Kleinen–Rostock lines
1847	1 May	Frankfurt am Main / Höchst	Bad Soden am Taunus	6.6 km, Soden Company
1847	22 May	Celle	Harburg	Uelzen, 127 km, Royal Hanoverian State Railways, Hanover–Hamburg line
1847	11 June	Ludwigshafen	Bexbach	Schifferstadt, Neustadt, Homburg, until 1849, ~115 km, Palatine Ludwig Railway Company, Palatine Ludwig Railway; extended by Saarbrücken Railway to Saarbrücken and Forbach by 1852 (~35 km); bridge opened to Mannheim in 1867
1847	11 June	Schifferstadt	Speyer	9.1 km, Palatine Ludwig Railway Company, Schifferstadt–Wörth line; extended to Germersheim (13.4 km) in 1864 and Wörth am Rhein (27.4 km) in 1876
1847	29 August	Riesa	Chemnitz	66 km, until 1852, Chemnitz-Riesa Railway Company, later Royal Saxon State Railways
1847	9 October	Elberfeld	Dortmund	Hagen, until 1849, 58 km, Bergisch-Märkische Railway Company, Elberfeld–Dortmund line
1847	15 October	Hanover	Minden	Wunstorf, Stadthagen, 64 km, Royal Hanoverian State Railways, Hanover–Minden line
1847	12 December	Bremen	Wunstorf	101 km, Verden, Nienburg, Royal Hanoverian State Railways and Bremen State Railway, Bremen–Hanover line
1848	9 March	Frankfurt am Main	Offenbach am Main	4.7 km, Frankfurt-Offenbach Local Railway
1848	30 March	Grebenstein	Bad Karlshafen	Hümme, until 29 August, 48 km, Frederick William Northern Railway Company, Kassel–Warburg line, Carl line
1848	26 May	Hamm	Münster	36 km, Münster-Hamm Railway Company
1848	28 May	Fröttstädt	Waltershausen	3.77 km, Thuringian Railway Company, Friedrichroda line
1848	25 July	Bietigheim	Heilbronn	29 km, Royal Württemberg State Railways, first section of 179.7 km-long Franconia Railway to Würzburg, finished in 1869
1848	1 August	Dresden	Bohemian border	Pirna, until 1851, 51 km, Royal Saxon State Railways, Dresden–Děčín railway
1848	29 August	Bebra	Kassel	56 km, Frederick William Northern Railway Company, Frederick William Northern line
1848	10 September	Frankfurt am Main	Hanau	16.4 km, Frankfurt-Hanau Railway Company
1848	1 October	Jüterbog	Riesa	79 km, Berlin-Anhalt Railway Company, Jüterbog–Riesa line
1848	14 October	Oberhausen	Ruhrort	9 km, Cologne-Minden Railway Company, Oberhausen–Duisburg-Ruhrort line
1849	6 March	Hümme	Warburg	20.2 km, Frederick William Northern Railway Company, Diemel Valley line
1849	7 July	Magdeburg	Wittenberge	109.1 km, Stendal, Seehausen, Magdeburg-Wittenberge Railway Company
1849	25 September	Bebra	Gerstungen	21.3 km, Frederick William Northern Railway Company, the western section of the Thuringian Railway
1849	15 October	Homberg	Mönchengladbach	Viersen, until 1851, 42 km, Ruhrort-Crefeld District Gladbach Railway Company, Duisburg-Ruhrort–Mönchengladbach line (Ruhrort-Homberg train ferry, opened 1852)
1849	29 December	Kassel	Frankfurt am Main	Marburg, Gießen, until 1852, 199 km, Main-Weser Railway
1850	4 October	Hamm	Warburg	Soest, Paderborn, until 1853, 130 km, Royal Westphalian Railway Company, Hamm–Warburg line
1851	15 October	Lübeck	Büchen	47 km, Lübeck-Büchen Railway Company, Lübeck–Lüneburg line, extended to Lauenburg (12 km) by Berlin-Hamburg Railway Company on 15 October 1851 and Lüneburg (17 km) by Royal Hanoverian State Railways on 15 March 1864, initially using the Lauenburg–Hohnstorf train ferry
1852	1 August	Bamberg	Aschaffenburg	Schweinfurt, Würzburg until 1854, 205 km, Ludwig's Western Railway, Royal Bavarian State Railways
1852	6 August	Bromberg	Königsberg	Dirschau, Marienburg, until 1857, 283 km, Prussian Eastern Railway, first railway bridge with a span of more than 100 metres
1852	12 August	Oberkassel	Belgian border	Neuss, Mönchengladbach, Aachen, until 1854, 64 km, Aachen-Düsseldorf-Ruhrort Railway Company, Aachen–Mönchengladbach and Mönchengladbach–Düsseldorf lines
1853	23 March	Mainz	Ludwigshafen	Worms 67.3 km, Hessian Ludwig Railway, Mainz–Ludwigshafen railway
1853	1 May	Hanover	Kassel	Alfeld, Kreiensen, Göttingen, until 1856, 166 km, Royal Hanoverian State Railways, Hanoverian Southern Railway
1853	26 September	Ulm	Kufstein	Augsburg, Munich, Rosenheim, until 1858, 190 km, Bavarian Maximilian's Railway, Royal Bavarian State Railways
1853	28 November	Bayreuth	Neuenmarkt-Wirsberg	21 km, first leased railway in Bavaria (built by Bayreuth city), Bayreuth–Neuenmarkt-Wirsberg line
1854	1 April	Flensburg	Tönning	Ohrstedt; ~110 km (including branch from Ohrstedt to Rendsburg opened on 25 October 1854); Flensburg-Husum-Tönning Railway Company (Frederik den Syvendes Sydslesvigske Jernbane, Danish at that time); sections of Neumünster–Flensburg and Jübek–Husum lines; Husum–Tönning line
1854	21 May	Pasing	Planegg	6.7 km, extended to Starnberg (28 November 1854) and Weilheim (36 km from Pasing, 1 February 1866), operated by Royal Bavarian State Railways, Munich–Garmisch-Partenkirchen line
1854	22 June	Hanau	Aschaffenburg	8.9 km, Frankfurt-Hanau Railway Company, Main–Spessart railway
1854	24 November	Emden	Löhne	Papenburg, Lingen, Rheine, Osnabrück, by 1856, 264 km, Hanoverian Western Railway, Royal Hanoverian State Railways
1855	20 February	Haltingen	Waldshut	Basel, Säckingen, until 1859, 62 km, Grand Duchy of Baden State Railway, High Rhine line
1855	18 June	Dresden	Werdau	Chemnitz, Glauchau, Zwickau, until 1869, 136 km, Royal Saxon State Railways, Dresden–Werdau line; branches: Glauchau–Gößnitz line (12 km), opened 15 November 1858 and Zwickau–Schwarzenberg line (38 km), opened 15 May 1858.
1855	9 July	Dortmund	Soest	Unna, 54 km, Bergisch-Märkische Railway Company, Dortmund–Soest line
1855	15 November	Cologne	Krefeld	53.6 km, Cöln-Crefeld Railway Company
1856	22 March	Leipzig	Großkorbetha	Markranstädt, 31.21 km, Thuringian Railway Company, Leipzig–Großkorbetha line
1856	23 June	Münster	Rheine	39 km, Royal Westphalian Railway Company, Münster–Rheine line
1856	1 July	Oberhausen	Dutch border	Wesel, Emmerich, 73 km, Cologne-Minden Railway Company, Oberhausen–Arnhem line
1856	5 August	Börßum	Kreiensen	Salzgitter-Bad, 61 km, Royal Hanoverian State Railways, Duchy of Brunswick State Railway, Brunswick Southern Railway
1856	11 August	Wiesbaden	Niederlahnstein	Rüdesheim, until, 1864, 88 km, Nassau Rhine and Lahn Railway Company, from 1861: Nassau State Railway, East Rhine line; 5 km extension by Prussian railways to Ehrenbreitstein in 1864; 70 km extension to Troisdorf opened by Rhenish Railway Company 1869–1871
1857	17 August	Dessau	Halle/Leipzig	Bitterfeld, until 1859 (Wittenberg), 125 km, Berlin-Anhalt Railway, Dessau-Leipzig line
1858	21 January	Rolandseck	Bingerbrück	Remagen, Koblenz, until 1859, 103.7 km, Rhenish Railway Company, West Rhine line
1858	1 June	Koblenz	Wetzlar	Oberlahnstein, Limburg, until 1863, 107 km, Nassau Rhine and Lahn Railway Company, later Nassau State Railway, Lahntal railway
1858	15 July	Bingerbrück	Neunkirchen	Bad Kreuznach, until 1860, 121 km, Rhine-Nahe line
1858	1 August	Mainz	Aschaffenburg	Darmstadt, 34 km, Hessian Ludwig Railway Company, Rhine-Main line
1858	1 November	Eisenach	Coburg	Lichtenfels, Coburg, until 151 km, Werra Railway Company
1858	1 November	Coburg	Sonneberg	Neustadt bei Coburg, 19.49 km, Werra Railway Company, Coburg–Sonneberg line
1858	3 November	Munich	Nuremberg	Landshut, Geiselhöring, Regensburg, Schwandorf, Amberg, Neukirchen, Hersbruck, until 1859, 289 km (including branch to Straubing), Bavarian Eastern Railway Company, Munich–Regensburg, Neufahrn–Radldorf, Regensburg–Passau, Regensburg–Weiden, Weiden–Hof, Nuremberg–Schwandorf lines
1858	16 December	Saarbrücken	Trier	Until 1860, 111 km Saarbrücken Railway, Saar line
1859	1 January	Cologne-Deutz	Gießen	Until 1862, 183 km (including branch to Siegen), Cologne-Minden Railway Company, Deutz–Gießen line
1859	2 February	Weißenfels	Zeitz	Teuchern, 31.25 km, Thuringian Railway Company, Weißenfels–Zeitz line
1859	19 March	Zeitz	Gera	Crossen an der Elster, 28.20 km, Thuringian Railway Company, Leipzig–Gera–Saalfeld line
1859	21 March	Hagen	Siegen	Altena, until 1861, 106 km, Bergisch-Märkische Railway Company, Ruhr–Sieg line
1859	1 July	Gunzenhausen	Würzburg	Ansbach, until 1864, 116 km, Royal Bavarian State Railways, Treuchtlingen–Würzburg line
1859	18 August	Waldshut	Koblenz, Switzerland	Grand Duchy of Baden State Railway, connection to the first railway bridge over the Rhine, largest span of 52 metres
1859	19 August	Witten	Duisburg	Bochum, Essen, until 1862, 58 km, Bergisch-Märkische Railway Company, Witten–Duisburg line
1859	20 September	Plochingen	Villingen	Tübingen, Rottweil, until 1869, 113 km, Royal Württemberg State Railways, Plochingen–Immendingen railway, Rottweil–Villingen railway
1859	15 October	Cologne-Deutz	Cologne	Cathedral Bridge (Dombrücke), Cologne-Minden Railway Company, The first railway bridge over the Rhine north of Switzerland, first connection between western and central European rail network
1860	7 May	Rosenheim	Salzburg	Traunstein, 84 km, Royal Bavarian State Railways, Rosenheim–Salzburg line
1860	10 September	Frankfurt am Main	Bad Homburg	19 km, Homburg Railway Company
1860	20 September	Straubing	Passau-Voglau	Until 1861, 77 km, Bavarian Eastern Railway Company, Regensburg–Passau line
1860	1 December	Borsdorf	Coswig	Until, 1868, 104 km, Leipzig–Dresden Railway Company, Borsdorf–Coswig line
1861	7 January	Schwandorf	Furth im Wald	Until 20 September, 67 km, Bavarian Eastern Railway Company, Schwandorf–Furth im Wald line
1861	25 July	Cannstatt	Nördlingen	Aalen, until 1863, 111 km, Royal Württemberg State Railways, Rems Railway
1862	23 January	Bremen	Bremerhaven	62 km, Royal Hanoverian State Railways and Bremen State Railway, Bremen–Bremerhaven railway
1862	7 June	Basel	Schopfheim	20 km, Wiesenthal Railway Company, Wiese Valley Railway
1862	4 August	Heilbronn	Crailsheim	Until 1867, Schwäbisch Hall, 88 km, Royal Württemberg State Railways, Hohenlohe Railway
1862	23 October	Heidelberg	Würzburg	Moosbach, Osterburken, till 1866, 120 km, Grand Duchy of Baden State Railway, Odenwald line
1863	3 January	Bischofsheim	Frankfurt am Main–Niederrad	23.6 km, Hessian Ludwig Railway Company, Main line
1863	3 March	Krefeld	Zevenaar, Netherlands	Geldern, Kleve, till 1865, 75 km, Rhenish Railway Company, West Lower Rhine line, Spyck–Welle train ferry
1863	15 March	Angermünde	Stralsund	170 km, Berlin-Stettin Railway Company, Angermünde–Stralsund line, as well as Szczecin–Pasewalk line (41.8 km)
1863	1 June	Karlsruhe	Mühlacker	43.5 km, Grand Duchy of Baden State Railway, Karlsruhe–Mühlacker line
1863	15 June	Waldshut	Konstanz	89 km, Grand Duchy of Baden State Railway, High Rhine Railway
1863	1 October	Irrenlohe	Bayreuth	Weiden, until 1 December, 98 km, Bavarian Eastern Railway Company, Regensburg–Weiden line, Weiden–Bayreuth line
1863	1 November	Roßlau	Zerbst	13 km, Anhalt Leopold Railway
1864	15 August	Weiden	Cheb	Mitterteich, until 15 October 1865, 60 km, Bavarian Eastern Railway Company, Weiden–Oberkotzau line, Wiesau–Cheb line
1864	21 September	Wendlingen	Kirchheim	6.5 km, Kirchheim Railway Company
1864	13 September	Aalen	Heidenheim	22.1 km, Royal Württemberg State Railways, Brenz Railway, completed to Ulm in 1876
1864	1 October	Altenbeken	Kreiensen	93 km, until 1865, Royal Westphalian Railway Company, Duchy of Brunswick State Railway, Altenbeken–Kreiensen line
1864	6 October	Düren	Trier	Euskirchen, Gerolstein, until 1871, 111 km, Rhenish Railway Company, Börde Railway, Eifel Railway
1864	11 November	Güstrow	Pasewalk	Strasburg, 140 km, until 1867, Grand Duchy of Mecklenburg Friedrich-Franz Railway, Berlin-Stettin Railway Company, Bützow–Szczecin line
1865	6 May	Neustadt	Bad Dürkheim	15 km, Neustadt-Dürkheim Railway Company, Palatine Northern Railway
1865	1 August	Hamburg	Lübeck	64 km, Lübeck-Büchen Railway, Lübeck–Hamburg railway
1865	1 September	Halle (Saale)	Eichenberg	Eisleben, Nordhausen, Leinefelde, 167 km, until 1867, Magdeburg-Leipzig Railway Company, Halle–Kassel railway
1865	23 October	Brunn (Saxony)	Greiz	Branch line of the Saxon-Bavarian Railway to Greiz, 9.75 km, Greiz-Brunn Railway Company
1865	1 November	Herlasgrün	Oelsnitz	Falkenstein, Saxony, 47 km, Royal Saxon State Railways, Voigtland State Railway (Herlasgrün–Oelsnitz and Plauen–Cheb lines)
1865	1 November	Cheb (Eger)	Oberkotzau	Aš, 54.8 km, City of Hof, Cheb–Oberkotzau railway
1865	28 December	Gößnitz	Gera	Schmölln, Ronneburg, 35 km, Gößnitz-Gera Railway Company
1866	18 January	Hagen	Hamm	Unna, 48 km, Bergisch-Märkische Railway Company, Hagen–Hamm line
1866	22 January	Frankfurt am Main	Bebra	Hanau, Elm, until 1914, 210 km, Frankfurt–Bebra Railway
1866	29 January	Viersen	Venlo	23.4 km, Bergisch-Märkische Railway Company, Viersen–Venlo line
1866	1 February	Flöha	Annaberg-Buchholz	43.5 km, Saxon State Railways, Annaberg-Buchholz–Flöha railway
1866	31 May	Neumünster	Neustadt	Ascheberg, Eutin (including the connections to Kiel), 110 km, Altona-Kiel Railway Company, Neumünster–Ascheberg line, Kiel–Lübeck line, Eutin–Neustadt line
1866	2 July	Offenburg	Haussach	33 km, the start of the Black Forest Railway, Grand Duchy of Baden State Railway,
1866	1 September	Osterrath	Wattenscheid	Mülheim-Saarn, Essen-Nord, until 1867, 43 km, Rhenish Railway Company, Osterath–Dortmund Süd line (including Rheinhausen–Hochfeld train ferry)
1866	6 September	Villingen	Singen	Until 1869, 63 km, the southern part of the Black Forest Railway, Grand Duchy of Baden State Railway
1866	13 September	Berlin	Görlitz	Cottbus, until 1867, 208 km, Berlin-Görlitz Railway Company
1866	1 October	Berlin	Kostrzyn	Until 1867, 85 km, Prussian Eastern Railway
1866	15 November	Goldshöfe	Crailsheim	30.4 km, Royal Württemberg State Railways, Upper Jagst Railway
1866	15 December	Eberswalde	Wriezen	Until 1867, 30 km, Berlin-Stettin Railway Company, Eberswalde–Frankfurt (Oder) line
1867	14 January	Neukieritzsch	Borna	6.8 km, Saxon-Bavarian Railway Company, Neukieritzsch–Chemnitz line; extended by 55.7 to Chemnitz in 1872
1867	29 January	Gruiten	Deutz	35 km, Bergisch-Märkische Railway Company, Gruiten–Köln-Deutz line
1867	16 May	Bremen	Wilhelmshaven/Leer	Oldenburg, until 1869, 152 km, Grand Duchy of Oldenburg State Railways, Prussian State Railways, Bremen–Oldenburg line, Wilhelmshaven–Oldenburg line, Oldenburg–Leer line
1867	19 May	Altona	Blankenese	9 km, Altona-Kiel Railway Company, Altona–Blankenese line
1867	14 July	Neudietendorf	Arnstadt	9.94 km, Thuringian Railway Company, Neudietendorf–Ritschenhausen line
1867	20 July	Radolfzell	Mengen	Until 1870, 57 km, Baden State Railway, Hegau-Ablach Valley Railway
1867		Munich	Ingolstadt	81 km, Royal Bavarian State Railways, Munich–Treuchtlingen line
1867	25 September	Ohligs Wald	Solingen Weyersberg	5.6 km, Bergisch-Märkische Railway Company, Wuppertal-Oberbarmen–Solingen line
1867	23 December	Kempen	Venlo	23 km, Rhenish Railway Company, Kempen–Venlo line
1868	13 January	Ulm	Donaueschingen	Sigmaringen, Tuttlingen, until 1890, 100 km, Royal Württemberg State Railways, Ulm–Sigmaringen railway, Tuttlingen–Inzigkofen railway
1868	1 May	Jerxheim	Börßum	23.2 km, Duchy of Brunswick State Railway, Jerxheim–Börßum line
1868	11 June	Pforzheim	Bad Wildbad	19.8 km, Baden State Railway, Enz Valley Railway
1868	25 June	Meckesheim	Jagstfeld	Bad Rappenau, until 1869, 36.4 km, Baden State Railway, Elsenz Valley Railway
1868	1 September	Barmen-Rittershausen	Remscheid	17.8 km, Bergisch-Märkische Railway Company, Wuppertal-Oberbarmen–Opladen railway
1868	23 September	Zuffenhausen	Ditzingen	Until 1872, 48.5 km, Royal Württemberg State Railways, Black Forest Railway (Württemberg)
1868	1 December	Northeim	Nordhausen	Herzberg am Harz, Bad Sachsa, until 1869, 69 km, Magdeburg-Leipzig Railway Company, South Harz Railway
1868	1 December	Mülheim	Bergisch Gladbach	9.5 km, Sülz Valley Railway, Bergisch-Märkische Railway Company
1869	1 March	Halberstadt	Vienenburg	34.3 km, Magdeburg-Halberstadt Railway Company, Halberstadt–Vienenburg line
1869	1 March	Niederwiesa	Hainichen	16.8 km, Royal Saxon State Railways, Roßwein–Niederwiesa line
1869	15 April	Frankfurt am Main	Worms and Mannheim	Darmstadt and Goddelau-Erfelden, until 1879, 112 km, Hessian Ludwig Railway Company, Ried Railway
1869	31 May	Rastatt	Gernsbach	15 km, Murg Valley Railway Company, Murg Valley Railway, 58.2 km line to Freudenstadt completed in 1928
1869	29 June	Tübingen	Sigmaringen	Until 1878, 97.5 km, Royal Württemberg State Railways, Zollernalb Railway
1869	25 July	Herbertingen	Waldsee	Aulendorf, 37.5 km, Royal Württemberg State Railways, Herbertingen–Aulendorf railway, Allgäu Railway (Württemberg)
1869	17 August	Wolkramshausen	Erfurt	Sondershausen, Straußfurt, 71.15 km, Nordhausen-Erfurt Railway Company
1869	1 September	Neuss	Duren	49 km, Erft Railway
1869	2 October	Gunzenhausen	Ingolstadt	Until 1870, 98 km (including branch to Pleinfeld), Royal Bavarian State Railways, Ingolstadt–Treuchtlingen line
1869	23 October	Wertheim	Crailsheim	100 km, Royal Württemberg State Railways, Grand Duchy of Baden State Railway, Tauber Valley Railway
1869	27 October	Lampertheim	Bensheim	Hofheim (Ried), 18.3 km, Hessian Ludwig Railway Company, Nibelungen Railway
1869	29 December	Gießen	Fulda	Alsfeld, 106 km, Upper Hessian Railway Company, Vogelsberg Railway
1869	29 December	Gießen	Gelnhausen	Büdingen, 69.7 km, Upper Hessian Railway Company, Lahn-Kinzig Railway
1870	1 January	Venlo	Hamburg	Wesel and Wanne, Haltern, Osnabrück, Bremen, until 1874, 455 km, Cologne-Minden Railway Company, Paris–Hamburg railway
1870	1 January	Limburg an der Lahn	Westerburg	28.6 km, Prussian state railways, Limburg-Altenkirchen line
1870	11 April	Gotha	Leinefelde	Bad Langensalza, Mühlhausen, 67.07 km, Thuringian Railway Company, Gotha–Leinefelde line
1870	20 April	Cottbus	Großenhain	79.7 km, Cottbus-Großenhain Railway Company, Großenhain–Cottbus line
1870	1 June	Diez	Wiesbaden	Langenschwalbach, 53.7 km, Prussian state railways, Aar Valley Railway
1870	1 June	Schwerte	Arnsberg	138 km (to Warburg), until 1873, Bergisch-Märkische Railway Company, Upper Ruhr Valley Railway
1870	29 June	Hanau	Eberbach	Wiebelsbach–Heubach, Erbach, 88.2 km, Hessian Ludwig Railway Company, Odenwald Railway
1870	1 July	Lübeck	Bad Kleinen	61.9 km, Friedrich-Franz railway, Lübeck–Bad Kleinen railway
1870	4 August	Mannheim	Karlsruhe	60.7 km, City of Mannheim, Rhine Railway, Hardt Railway
1870	27 December	Darmstadt	Wiebelsbach–Heubach	Ober-Ramstadt, 31.9 km, Hessian Ludwig Railway Company, Odenwald Railway

== Maps ==
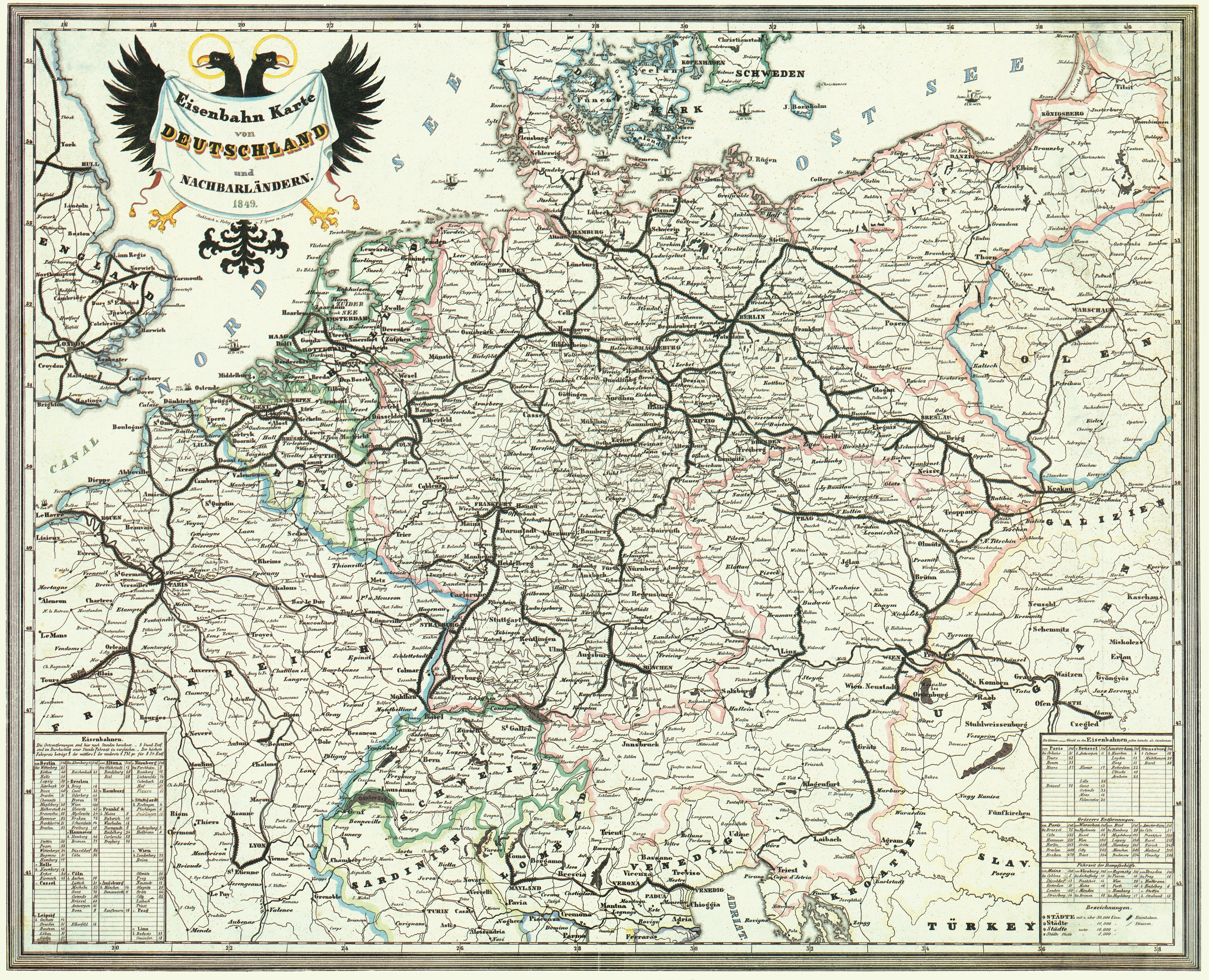
Rail network in 1849

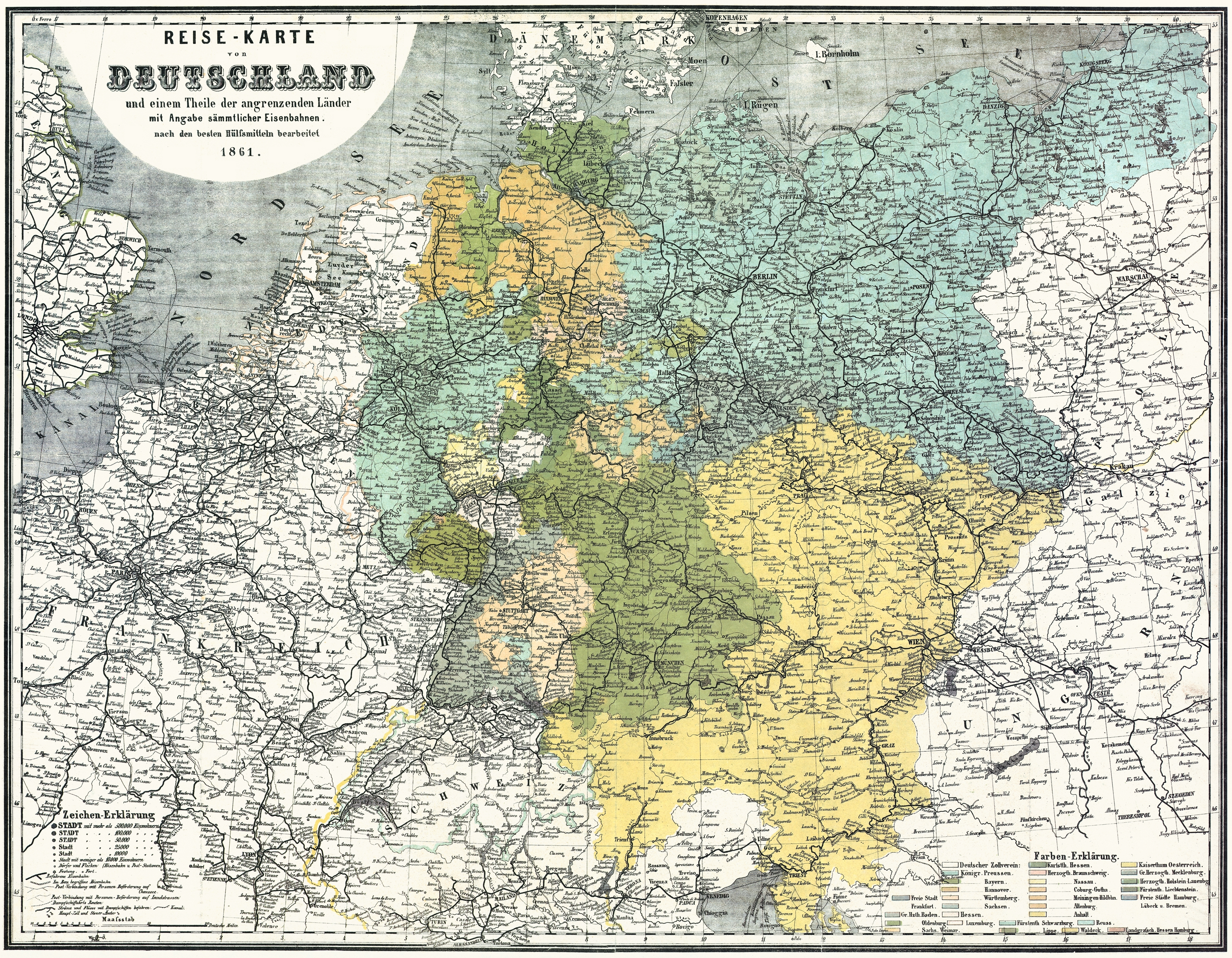
Rail network in 1861
