= Amberg station =

Railway station in Amberg, Germany

Amberg
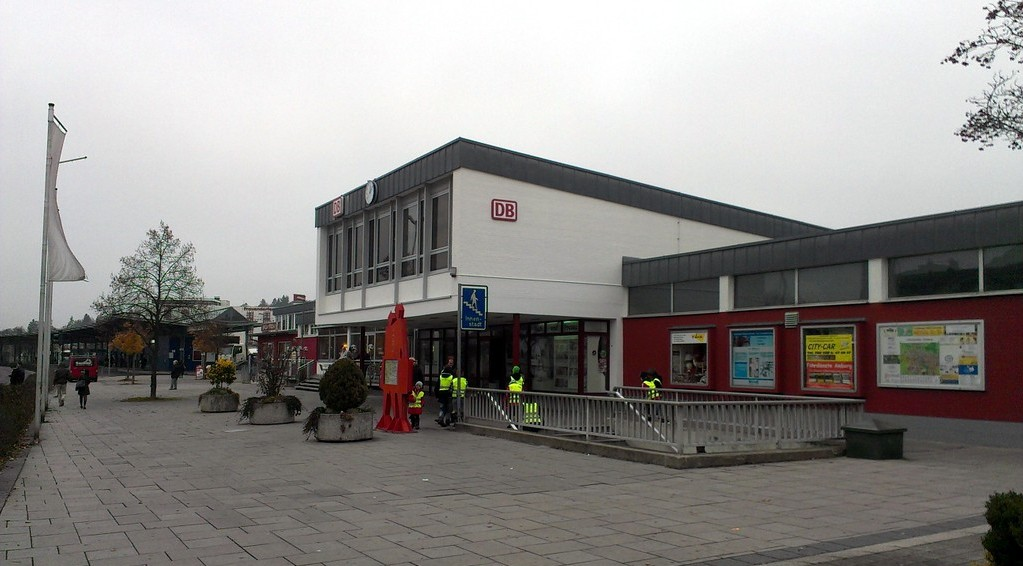

General information
- Location: Kaiser-Ludwig-Ring 7; 92224 Amberg; Bavaria; Germany
- Coordinates: 49°26′51″N 11°51′48″E
- Owner: Deutsche Bahn
- Operator: DB Netz; DB Station&Service
- Lines: Nuremberg–Schwandorf railway Amberg–Lauterhofen railway Amberg–Schnaittenbach railway
- Train operators: DB Regio Bayern
- Connections: 1 2 3 4 5 6 7 8 9 10 11 12 51 54 55 56 57 58 59 90 401 402 403 404 405 406 407 408 409 410 411 412 414 443 449 451 454 455 456 457 458 459 460 461 462 465 471 472 476 480 486 488 490

Other information
- Station code: 134
- DS100 code: NAM
- IBNR: 8000566
- Category: 5
- Fare zone: RVV: 9A; VGN: 1522 and 1531
- Website: www.bahnhof.de

Services
Preceding station	DB Regio Bayern	Following station
Sulzbach-Rosenberg towards Nürnberg Hbf	RE 40	Freihöls towards Regensburg Hbf
Sulzbach-Rosenberg towards Nürnberg Hbf	RE 43	Irrenlohe One-way operation
Sulzbach-Rosenberg towards Nürnberg Hbf	RE 47	Irrenlohe towards Furth im Wald
Location
- Location within Bavaria Location within Germany Location within Europe

Amberg station is a railway station in the town of Amberg, located in Upper Palatinate, Germany.
