= Geigant station =

Railway station in Germany

Geigant
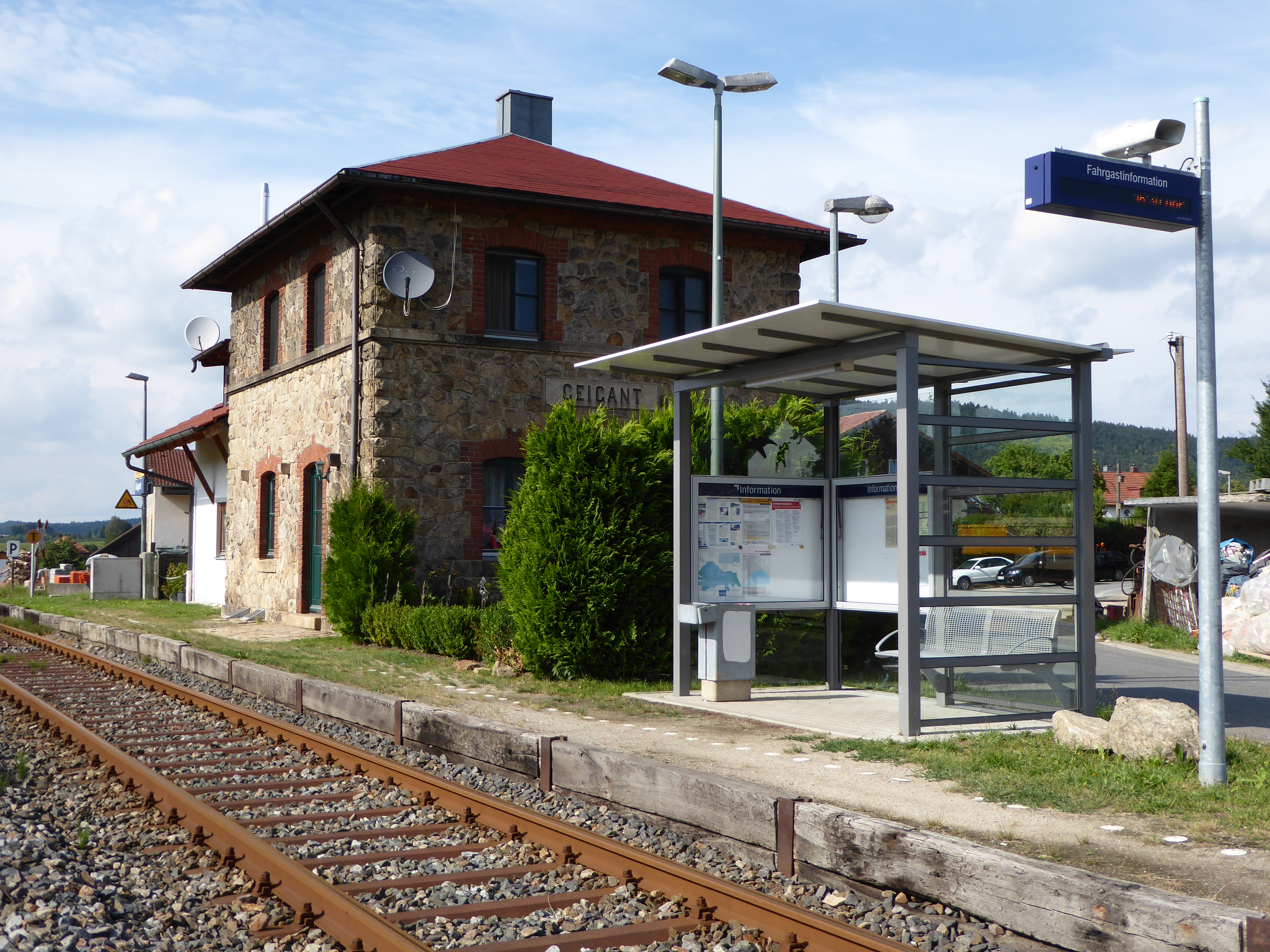
- 2015

General information
- Location: Am Bahnhof; 93449 Waldmünchen; Bavaria; Germany
- Coordinates: 49.3234°N 12.6815°E
- Elevation: 504 m (1,654 ft)
- System: Hp
- Owner: DB Netz
- Operator: DB Station&Service
- Lines: Cham–Waldmünchen railway (KBS 876)
- Platforms: 1 side platform
- Tracks: 1
- Train operators: oberpfalzbahn

Other information
- Station code: 2036
- DS100 code: NGET
- IBNR: 8002205
- Category: 7
- Website: www.bahnhof.de

Services
Preceding station		Following station
Balbersdorf towards Cham (Oberpf)	RB 29	Zillendorf towards Waldmünchen
Location
- Location within Bavaria Location within Germany Location within Europe

Geigant station is a railway station in the Geigant district in the municipality of Waldmünchen, located in the Cham district in Bavaria, Germany.
