= Schwandorf station =

Railway station in Germany

Schwandorf
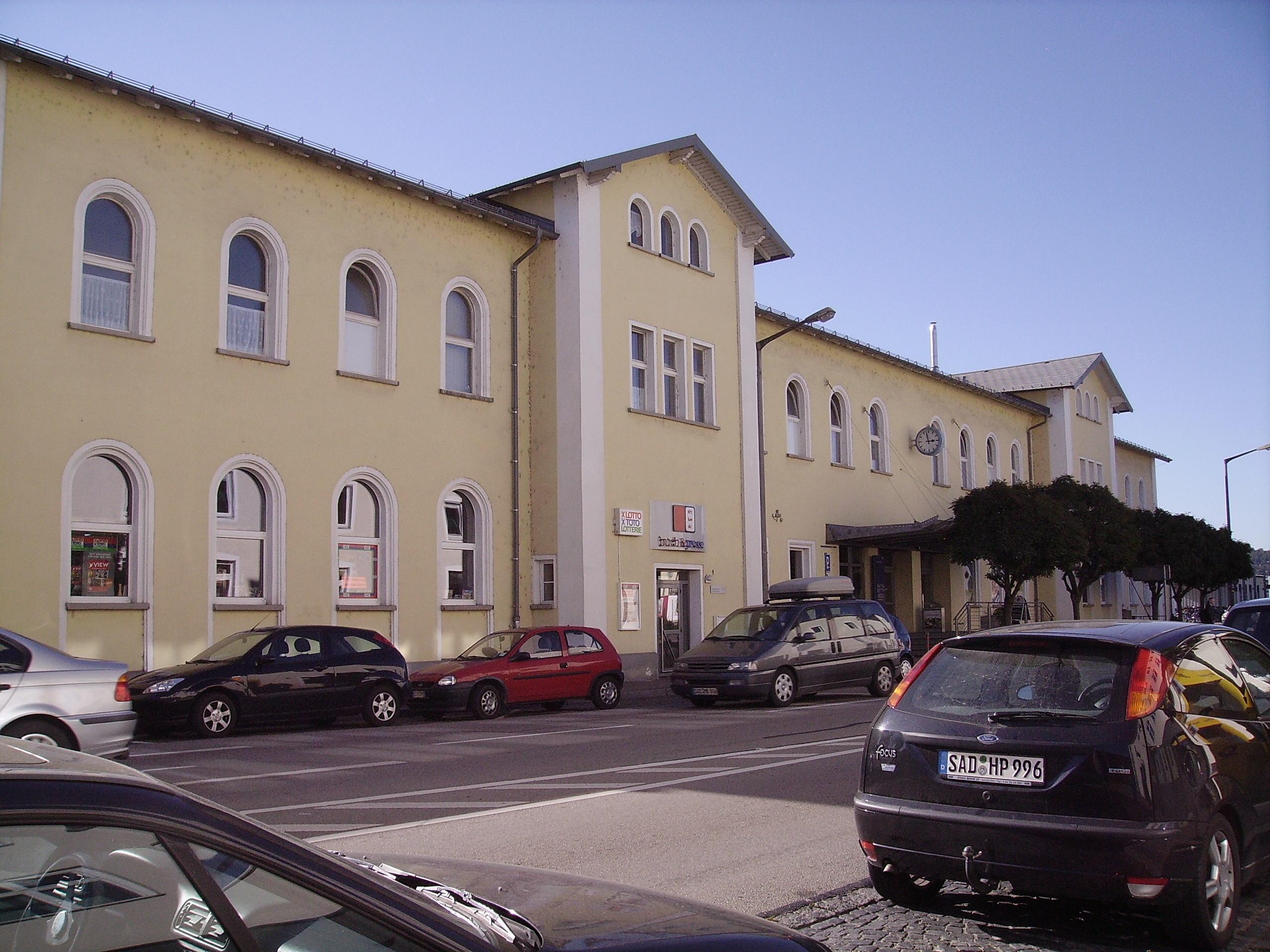
- Front of Schwandorf station

General information
- Location: Schwandorf, Bavaria; Germany
- Coordinates: 49°19′35.76″N 12°6′14.51″E
- Owner: Deutsche Bahn
- Operator: DB Station&Service
- Lines: Regensburg–Weiden (KBS 855); Nuremberg–Schwandorf (KBS 870); Schwandorf–Furth im Wald (KBS 875)
- Platforms: 5
- Connections: RE 2 RE 25 RE 40 RE 43 RE 47; RB 23 RB 27

Other information
- Station code: 5710
- DS100 code: NSCH
- IBNR: 8000027
- Category: 4
- Fare zone: RVV: 7A
- Website: stationsdatenbank.de; www.bahnhof.de

History
- Opened: 12 December 1859; 166 years ago

Services
| Preceding station | DB Regio Bayern | Following station |
|---|---|---|
| Regensburg Hbf towards München Hbf | RE 2 | Weiden (Oberpf) towards Hof Hbf |
| Freihöls towards Nürnberg Hbf | RE 40 | Maxhütte-Haidhof towards Regensburg Hbf |
| Irrenlohe towards Nürnberg Hbf | RE 43 | Maxhütte-Haidhof One-way operation |
| Irrenlohe towards Nürnberg Hbf | RE 47 | Bodenwöhr Nord towards Furth im Wald |
| Preceding station | | Following station |
| Regensburg Hbf towards München Hbf | RE 23 | Weiden (Oberpf) towards Hof Hbf |
| Regensburg Hbf towards München Hbf | RE 25 | Cham (Oberpf) towards Praha hl.n. |
| Preceding station | | Following station |
| Irrenlohe towards Regensburg Hbf | RB 23 | Maxhütte-Haidhof towards Marktredwitz or Neustadt (Waldnaab) |
| Terminus | RB 27 | Bodenwöhr Nord towards Domažlice |
| Terminus | RB 28 | Bodenwöhr Nord towards Lam |
Location
- Location within Bavaria Location within Germany Location within Europe

Schwandorf station is the second most important regional transport hub in the Upper Palatinate province of Bavaria after Regensburg Hauptbahnhof, and one of the two working railway stations in the town of Schwandorf. It is classified as a category 3 station by Deutsche Bahn.

== History ==
The station was opened on 12 December 1859 by the Bavarian Eastern Railway Company, when the Nuremberg–Schwandorf–Regensburg route was taken into service. Just under four years later, on 1 October 1863, the Schwandorf–Weiden line was opened and, in 1865, it was extended to Cheb. The link to Cham was opened on 7 January 1861 and in autumn of that year the line was opened all the way through to Prague via Furth im Wald and Plzeň. The result was that two lines passed through the town, one in a north-south and one in an east-west direction. These lines still exist, although Schwandorf can no longer be called a "railwayman's town" as used to be the case.

== Infrastructure and facilities ==
The station has eleven main lines of which five are used for passenger services. The home platform and the two island platforms are 38 cm high and do not meet the requirement for barrier-free admission. In the station building, there is a ticket machine, a newsagent, a bakery, and a shop for travellers with a bistro.

== Services ==
| Line | Route | Frequency | Operator |
|---|---|---|---|
| RE 2 | Hof – Marktredwitz – Weiden (Oberpf) – Schwandorf – Regensburg – Landshut – Freising – Munich | 120 min | DB Regio Bayern |
| RE 23 | Hof – Marktredwitz – Weiden (Oberpf) – Schwandorf – Regensburg – Landshut – Freising – Munich | One train pair | alex |
| RE 25 | Prague – Furth im Wald – Schwandorf – Regensburg – Landshut – Freising – Munich | 120 min | alex |
| RE 40 | Nuremberg – Amberg – Schwandorf – Regenstauf – Regensburg | 60 min | DB Regio Bayern |
| RE 43 | Nuremberg – Amberg – Schwandorf – Regenstauf – Regensburg | 2 trains towards Nuremberg | DB Regio Bayern |
| RE 47 | Nuremberg – Amberg – Schwandorf – Cham – Furth im Wald | 2 train paris | DB Regio Bayern |
| RB 23 | Marktredwitz – Weiden (Oberpf) – Nabburg – Schwandorf – Regensburg | 60 min | Oberpfalzbahn |
| RB 27 | Schwandorf – Cham – Furth im Wald | 120 min | Oberpfalzbahn |
| RB 28 | Schwandorf – Cham – Lam | Some trains | Oberpfalzbahn |

== Klardorf station ==
South of Schwandorf in the suburb of Klardorf there is another station at which no passenger trains have stopped since 2 June 1985.
