= Nuremberg–Schwandorf railway =

Railway line in Germany

Overview
- Line number: 5860 (Irrenlohe – Schwandorf); 5904 (Nürnberg Hbf – Irrenlohe)
- Locale: Bavaria, Germany

Service
- Route number: 870, 890.1

Technical
- Line length: 93.7 km (58.2 mi)
- Number of tracks: 2 (Nürnberg Hbf – Amberg, Irrenlohe – Schwandorf)
- Track gauge: 1,435 mm (4 ft 8 1/2 in) standard gauge
- Electrification: 15 kV/16.7 Hz AC catenary (Nürnberg Hbf – Hartmannshof)
- Operating speed: 160 km/h (99 mph)

The Nuremberg–Schwandorf railway is a 93.7 km long railway from Nuremberg, running along the Pegnitz river, to Hersbruck and continuing via Neukirchen bei Sulzbach-Rosenberg and Amberg to Schwandorf in the German state of Bavaria. It runs parallel to the Nuremberg–Cheb line (the Right Pegnitz line, German: rechte Pegnitzstrecke) between Nuremberg and Pommelsbrunn and this section is known as the Left Pegnitz line (linke Pegnitzstrecke). It was opened in 1859 and is one of the oldest railways in Germany.

== History ==
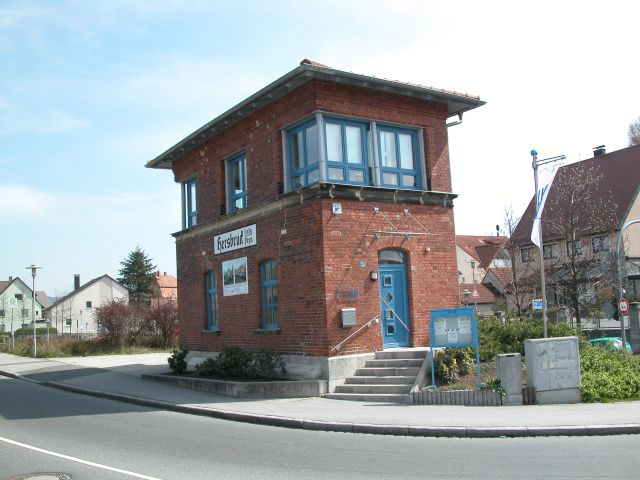
The former eastern signal box in Hersbruck (left Pegnitz) is now an architect's office

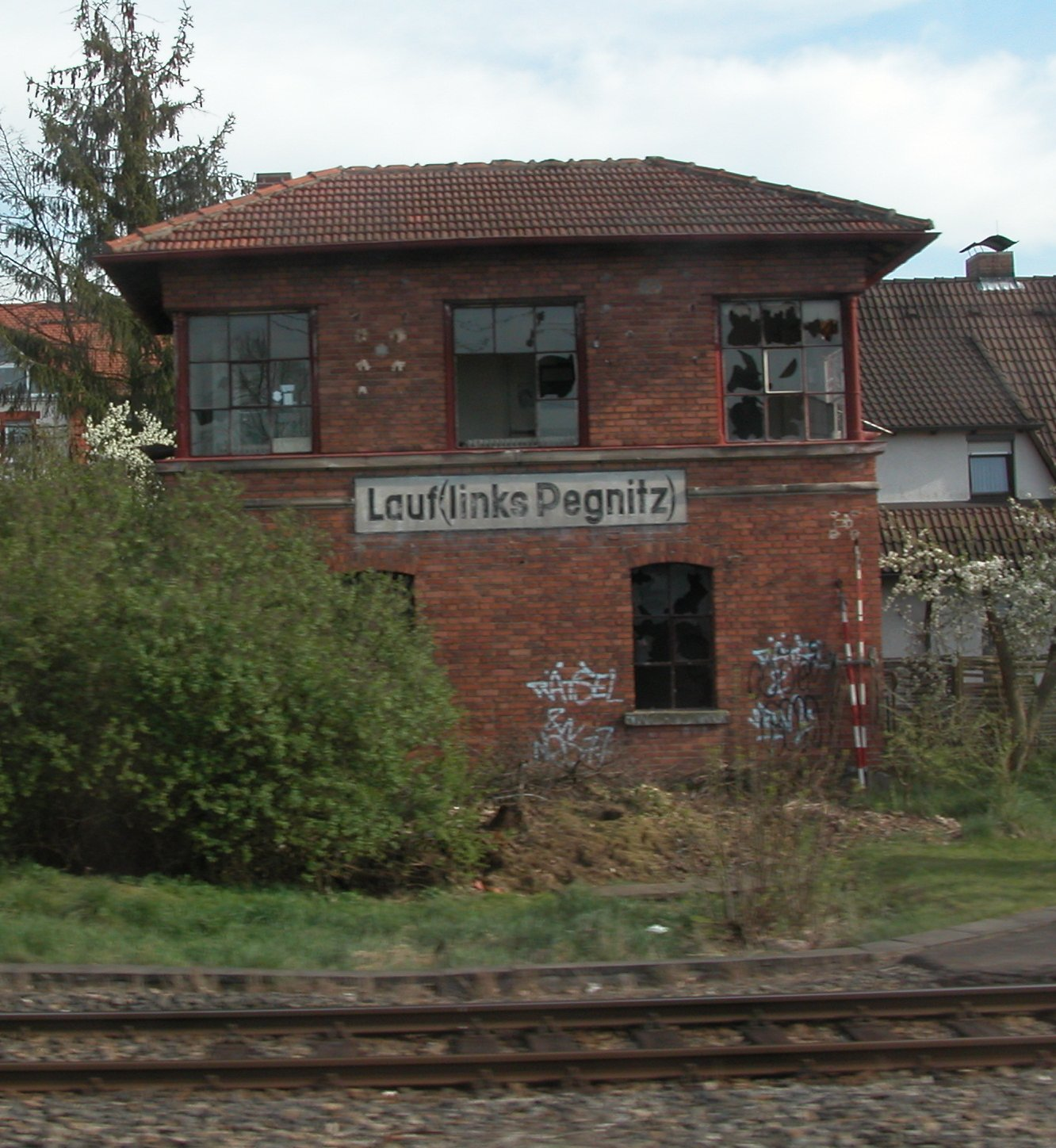
The former eastern signal box in Lauf (left Pegnitz)

On 12 April 1856, King Maximilian II of Bavaria gave the Bavarian Eastern Railway (Königlich privilegirte Actiengesellschaft der bayerischen Ostbahnen) permission to build the line, which was completed as a single-track line in 1859. The company was nationalised and became part of the Bavarian State Railways on 1 January 1876. In the same year, the line between Nuremberg and the suburb of Mögeldorf was duplicated. In 1910–12 the line was duplicated between Mögeldorf to Amberg. The second track was put into operation from Neukirchen to Sulzbach on 1 May 1911, from Mögeldorf to Neukirchen in October 1912 and from Sulzbach to Amberg in December 1912. The line had been duplicated between Irrenlohe and Schwandorf on 1 October 1863.

As a result of the shortage of railway materials during the Second World War, the line between Nuremberg-Laufamholz and Hersbruck was reduced to single track in 1943. During the reconstruction of the Nuremberg–Lauf section for the Nuremberg S-Bahn in 1983, the second track was re-installed and electrified. As part of the extension of S-Bahn operations from Lauf to Hartmannshof, the line was blocked to all traffic between Lauf and Hersbruck from 1 August to 14 September 2009. During this period, the second track was restored, installations for overhead wire were built and the upgrading of stations was started. On 14 December 2009, new platforms were opened at Ottensoos, located about 300 metres closer to the centre of the town than the old station. On 15 November 2010, the reconstructed second track was opened between Lauf and Hersbruck.

=== Opening dates ===
- Nuremberg–Hersbruck: 9 May 1859
- Hersbruck–Schwandorf–Regensburg: 12 December 1859

== Route ==
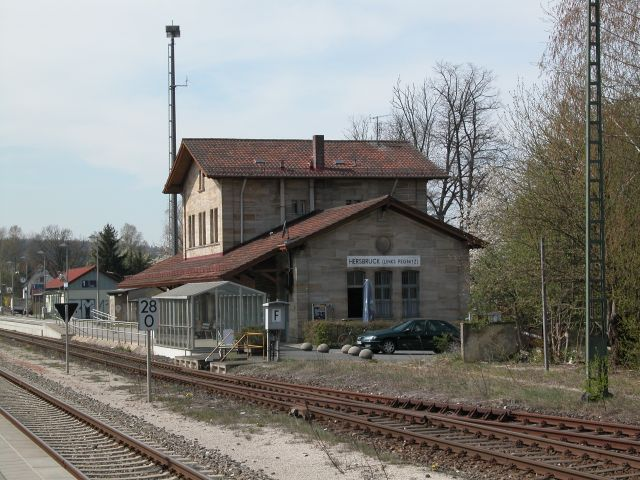
Hersbruck station

The line leaves Nuremberg station to the east and runs to Pommelsbrunn along the left (southern) bank of the Pegnitz. Between Hartmannshof and Etzelwang the line climbs steeply to cross the Franconian Jura (a section known as the Kleinen Schiefen Ebene, “small inclined plane”). The line continued to the junction station of Neukirchen (where the line to Weiden branches off), Sulzbach-Rosenberg, and past the former Maxhütte (Bavaria’s last steelworks) to Amberg. At Amberg station, the line to Lauterhofe used to branch off; it used to connect with a branch to Schmidmühlen, a branch line to Schnaittenbach still operates for freight only. The line continues to Irrenlohe, where it meets the Regensburg–Weiden railway and ends four km later in Schwandorf station.

=== Technical standards ===
The route is double track from Nuremberg to Amberg and electrified between Nuremberg and Hartmannshof for the S-Bahn service. The remaining route is not electrified and the section between Amberg and Irrenlohe is single-track.

=== Transport authorities ===
Since 1997, the Nuremberg–Amberg section is integrated as Regionalbahn line R4 of the network of the Greater Nuremberg Transport Association (Verkehrsverbund Großraum Nürnberg, VGN). Since 2009, the Amberg–Schwandorf section is integrated into the network of the Regensburg Transport Association (Regensburger Verkehrsverbund, RVV).

== Operations ==
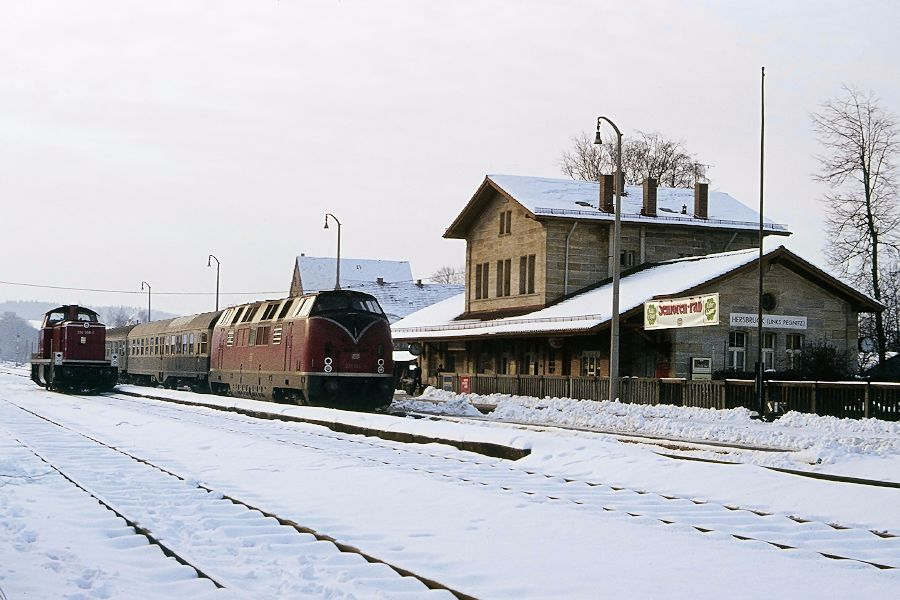
Hersbruck station in January 1977

Neukirchen station has facilities for coupling and uncoupling class 610 (Pendolino) and 612 (RegioSwinger) diesel tilting trains.

Regional-Express (RE) services operate on the Nuremberg–Neukirchen–Schwandorf / Neukirchen–Weiden–Neustadt route between Nuremberg and Hersbruck, running on the Right Pegnitz line and then switching via the Hersbruck–Pommelsbrunn link to the Left Pegnitz line at Pommelsbrunn. Some services run as coupled sets to Neukirchen, and then run separately towards Neustadt and towards Schwandorf. Most operate from Nuremberg to Hersbruck separately or together with a train set that is uncoupled at Hersbruck to continue to Bayreuth. In the opposite direction, the trains from Weiden and Schwandorf were generally coupled in Neukirchen before proceeding to Nuremberg. Twice a day services of the Bayern-Böhmen-Express run on the route from Nuremberg via Schwandorf and Furth im Wald to Prague; it uses the Pegnitz Right line to Hersbruck. The Czech express trains are hauled by class 223 locomotives.

On the Nuremberg–Hartmannshof section the Nuremberg S-Bahn trains are currently operated with class 143 electric locomotives and sets of “x” carriages in the absence of an approval for class 442 electric multiple units to operate in Nuremberg.

In addition to passenger trains, several freight trains operate on the line each day, mainly hauled by class 232 diesel locomotives.

=== Upgrade in preparation for the extension of the S-Bahn to Hartmannshof ===
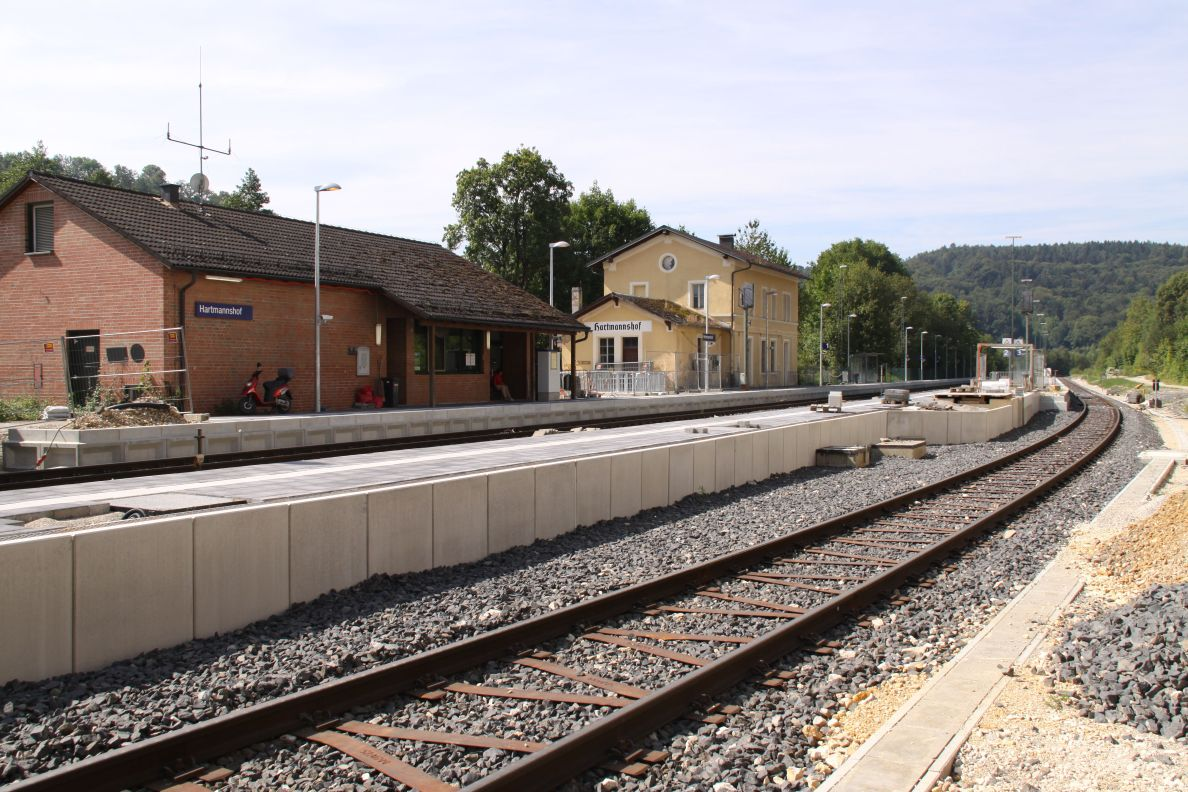
Hartmannshof station

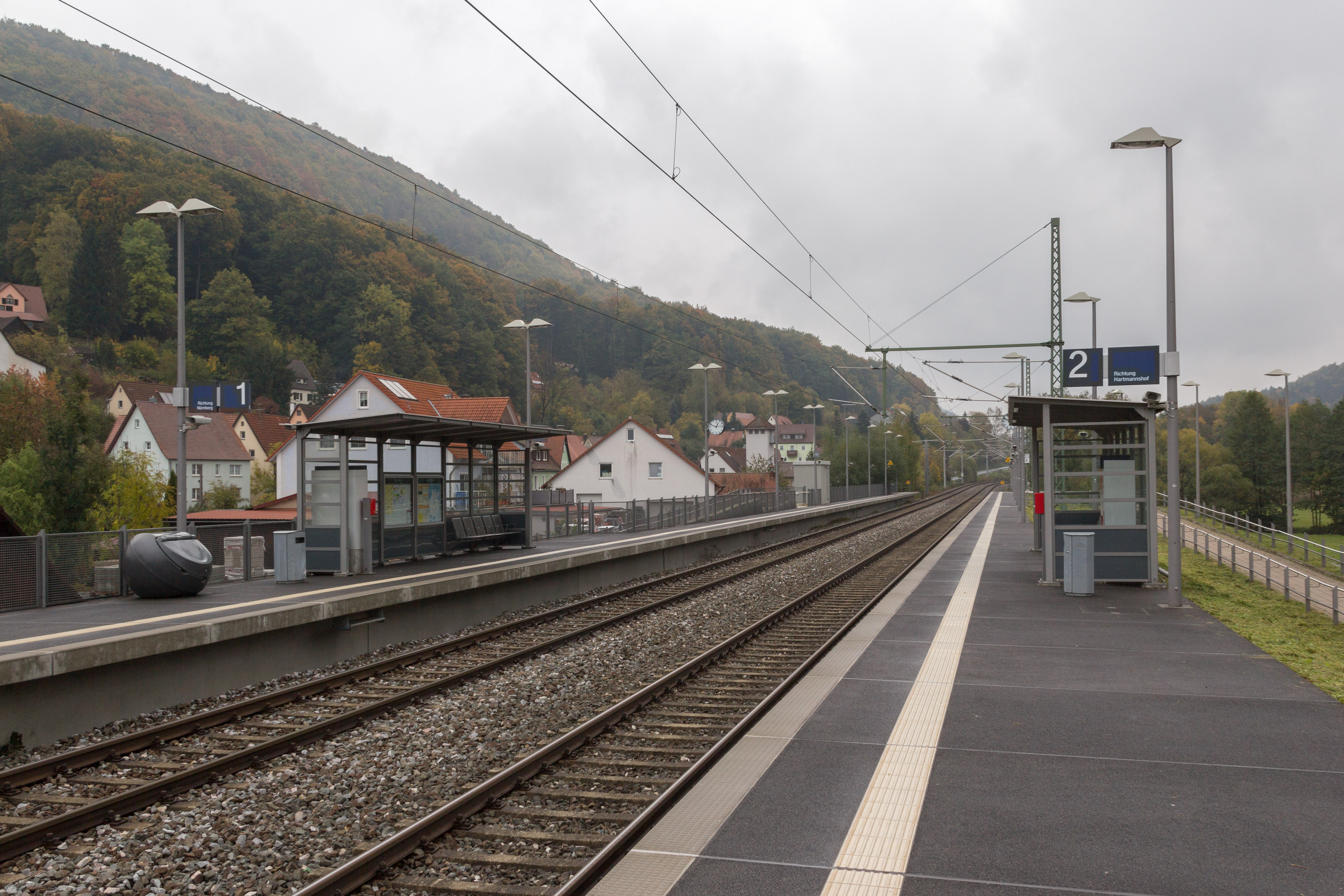
Pommelsbrunn station in October 2015

In December 2010, S-Bahn services were extended beyond Hersbruck to Hartmannshof. The route between Lauf and Hersbruck was equipped with a second track and was electrified from Lauf to Hartmannshof. All stations along the route were rebuilt to S-Bahn standard (140 m long with 76 cm high platforms) and provided with barrier-free access. A new station was established in Happurg (between Hersbruck and Pommelsbrunn), the former halt in Pommelsbrunn was abandoned and replaced on 4 December 2010 by a new halt 500 m to the east. The cost of the S-Bahn extension amounted to approximately €55 million.
