= Cham (Oberpf) station =

Railway station in Bavaria, Germany

Cham (Oberpf)
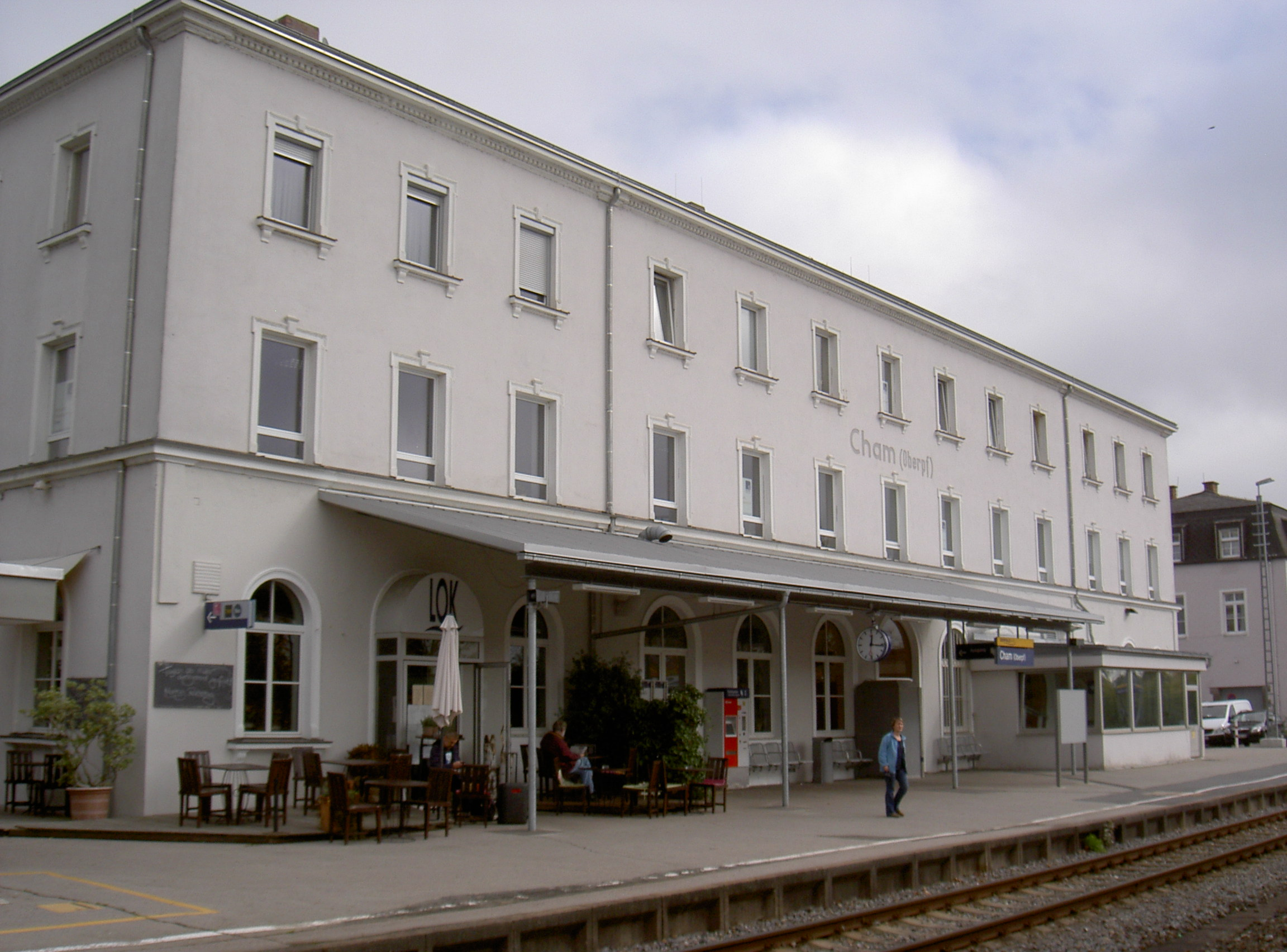
- 2014

General information
- Location: Bahnhofstraße 11; 93413 Cham; Bavaria; Germany
- Coordinates: 49°13′19″N 12°39′25″E
- Elevation: 374 m (1,227 ft)
- System: Bf
- Owner: Deutsche Bahn
- Operator: DB Netz; DB Station&Service
- Lines: Schwandorf–Furth im Wald railway (KBS 875); Cham–Lam railway (KBS 877); Cham–Waldmünchen railway (KBS 876)
- Platforms: 1 island platform 1 side platform
- Tracks: 4
- Train operators: Arriva-Länderbahn-Express (alex); oberpfalzbahn
- Connections: RE 25 RE 47; RB 27 RB 28 RB 29; 34 100 101 103 180 210 219 310 320 410 420 610 620 710 810 6075 6511

Construction
- Parking: yes
- Cycle facilities: yes
- Accessible: partly

Other information
- Station code: 1037
- DS100 code: NCH
- IBNR: 8001330
- Category: 4
- Fare zone: VLC
- Website: www.bahnhof.de

Services
Preceding station	DB Regio Bayern	Following station
Pösing towards Nürnberg Hbf	RE 47	Kothmaißling towards Furth im Wald
Preceding station		Following station
Schwandorf towards München Hbf	RE 25	Furth im Wald towards Praha hl.n.
Preceding station		Following station
Pösing towards Schwandorf	RB 27	Kothmaißling towards Domažlice
Terminus	RB 28	Chamerau towards Lam
Terminus	RB 29	Willmering towards Waldmünchen
Location
- Location within Bavaria Location within Germany Location within Europe

Cham (Oberpf) station is a railway station in the municipality of Cham, located in the Cham district in Bavaria, Germany. The station is located in the Upper Palatinate (Oberpfalz, abbreviated to "Oberpf" in the station's name) administrative district.

== See also ==
- Rail transport in Germany
