= Regensburg–Weiden railway =

Two-track main line railway in Bavaria, Germany

Regensburg–Weiden Railway
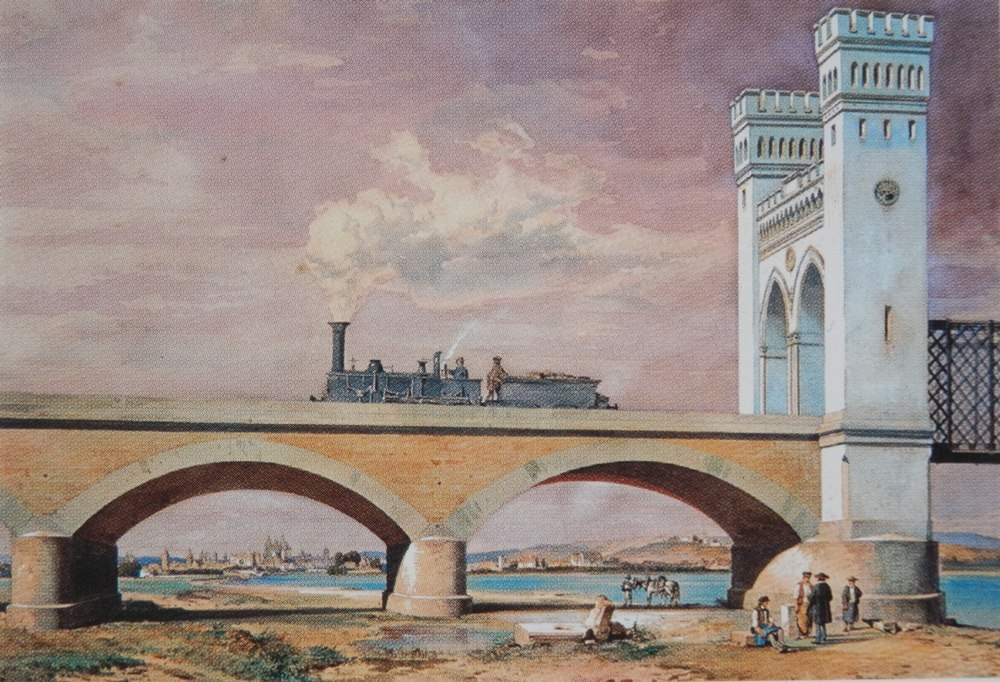
- Bridge over the Danube at Schwabelweis near Regensburg (1859)

Overview
- Status: Operational
- Owner: Deutsche Bahn
- Line number: 5860
- Locale: Bavaria
- Termini: Regensburg; Weiden

Service
- Type: Heavy rail, Passenger rail Regional rail
- Route number: 855
- Operator(s): Vogtlandbahn

History
- Opened: 1859 and 1863

Technical
- Line length: 86.617 km (53.821 mi)
- Track gauge: 1,435 mm (4 ft 8 1/2 in) standard gauge
- Operating speed: 160 km/h (99 mph)
Route map
- Source: German railway atlas

The Regensburg–Weiden railway is a two-track main line railway in Bavaria, Germany. It connects the Upper Palatinate district capital of Regensburg via Schwandorf with Weiden in der Oberpfalz.

== Route description ==
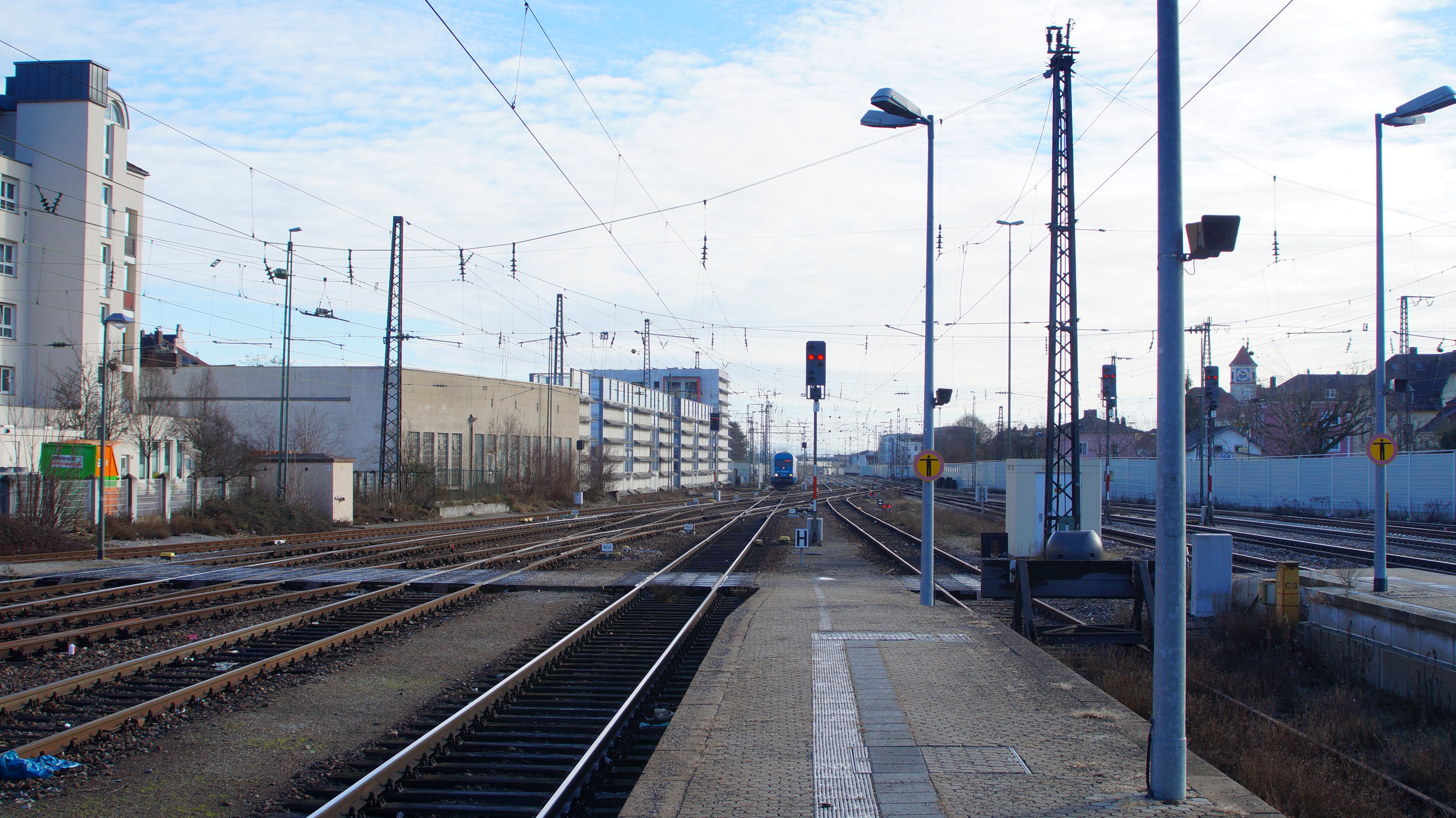
Eastern end of Regensburg Hauptbahnhof with a Länderbahn train coming from Hof

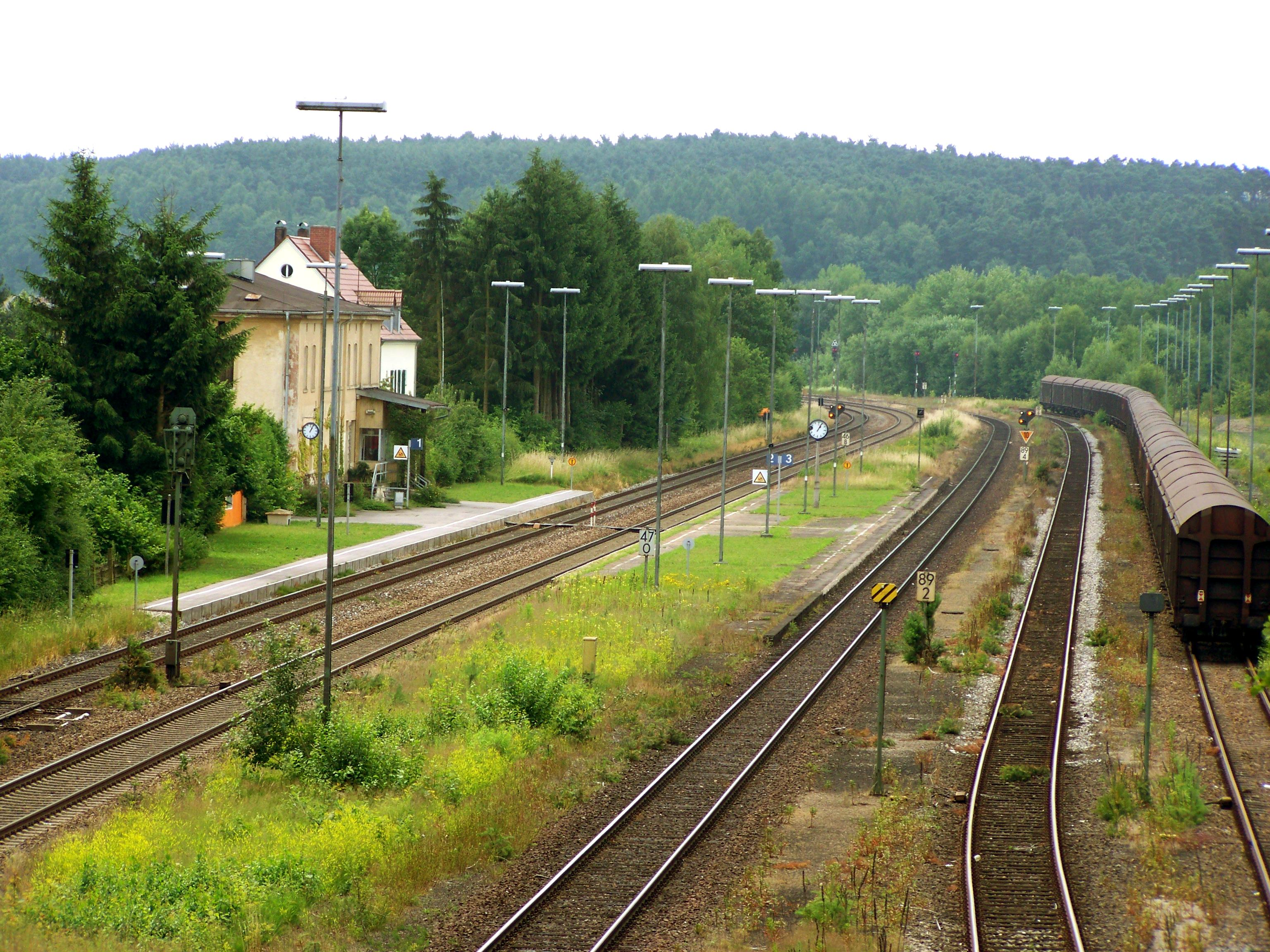
Irrenlohe station, between the tracks from Nuremberg, 2009

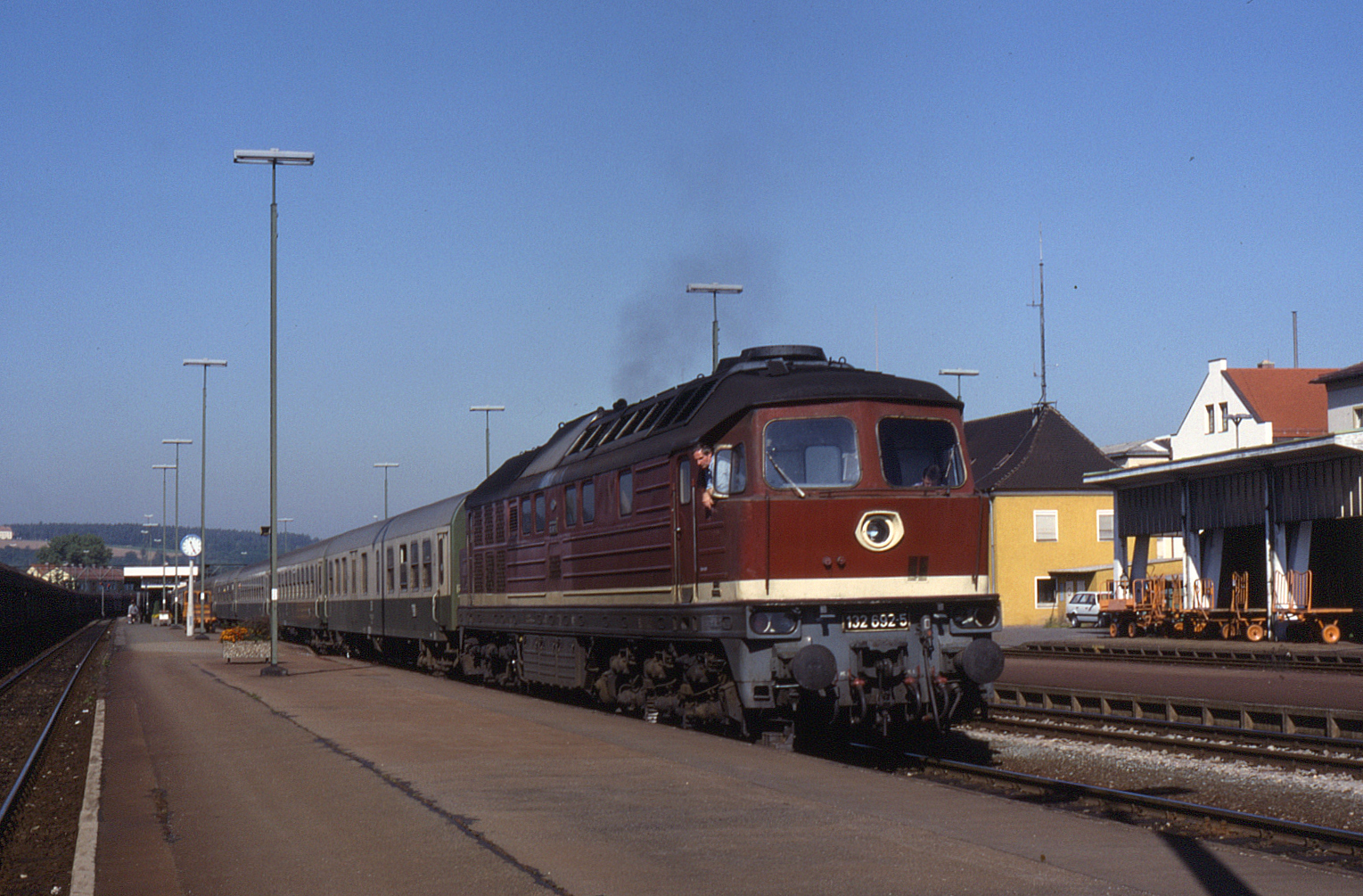
Passenger train hauled by a Class 132 diesel locomotive of Deutsche Reichsbahn in Schwandorf, 1991

The line begins at Regensburg Hauptbahnhof and from there runs to the east parallel to the line to Passau. The lines separate at the Safferling footbridge. The line to Passau turns south, while the line to Weiden heads north through the Regensburg port area and crosses bridges over the Westhafen and the Danube. The line runs east of the Regensburg districts of Konradsiedlung, Wutzlhofen and Haslbach, swings to the northwest and follows the Regen to Regenstauf. After Regenstauf the line crosses the Regen, continues to the northwest, crosses the A 93 and loops through the Ponholz forest. After Ponholz, the line continues north to Maxhütte-Haidhof, where the line to Burglengenfeld branches off, and continues between the Naab and the A 93 to Schwandorf.

Schwandorf station is an important railway junction in the Upper Palatinate. There the north–south connection from Dresden via Hof to Regensburg and Munich meets the east–west connection from Frankfurt via Nuremberg to Furth im Wald and Prague. The line from Furth runs from the east to meet the Regensburg–Weiden line south of the station, while the line to Nuremberg branches off four kilometres north at Irrenlohe station to run to the west.

After crossing the Naab and leaving Irrenlohe station, it runs past Schwarzenfeld and meets the remnants of the railway from Schönsee at Stulln. This former local railway crossed the Naab and the main line to Weiden and then ran on its western side to Nabburg, where the branch line had its starting point until 1994. The main route continues along the right bank of the Naab past Pfreimd, Wernberg-Köblitz and Luhe-Wildenau to Weiden in der Oberpfalz. Like Schwandorf, the station is a hub because the lines to Nuremberg (via Neukirchen) and to Bayreuth branch off there. In addition to a former locomotive depot that existed until the 1990s, there is a repair shop for passenger coaches (PFA Weiden) in Weiden, which now belongs to Stadler Rail.

== History ==
The line was opened in several sections by the Bavarian Eastern Railway Company (Bayerischen Ostbahnen) and operated by it until its nationalisation in 1876. The Regensburg–Schwandorf–Irrenlohe section was opened on 12 December 1859 as part of the Regensburg–Nuremberg route. A branch line from Irrenlohe to Weiden was opened four years later, on 1 October 1863. The section from Weiden via Wiesau and continuing to Mitterteich was opened to traffic another year later, on 15 August 1864. After the opening of the link from Mitterteich to Cheb (German: Eger) on 15 October 1865 and the link from Hof to Cheb on 1 November 1865 it was possible to travel by train from Regensburg to Hof—but only with the detour via Cheb, which is located in Bohemia and at that time belonged to the Austro-Hungarian Empire and is now part of the Czech Republic.

Opening dates

- 12 December 1859 (Regensburg – Irrenlohe on the line to Nuremberg)
- 1 October 1863 (Irrenlohe – Weiden on the line to Cheb)

=== Buchtalbahn ===
The Buchtalbahn (Buchtal Railway) was a freight railway built in the mid-1930s connecting to Schwarzenfeld that primarily served the Buchtal company. It connected to an extensive rail layout.

A separate settlement was built in Schwarzenfeld for the workers employed there. To bring these workers to the factory premises, the line was also used for passenger trains that operated until at least 1961. At least one Mallet locomotive of the B'Bn 4VT class with the number 3 was present to operate this line. A diesel locomotive was there for shunting from 1968 to 1998.

An excursion train has operated on the line since 1988. Freight traffic on the line was discontinued in 2009.

There was also a connecting line from the station in Schwarzenfeld to the Bavaria colliery in Schmidgaden also called the Buchtalbahn.

=== Realignment to the north of Schwandorf ===
Straightening of the route north of Schwandorf and the construction of a new Naab bridge began before 1945. Construction only recommenced in the 1980s and was completed in October 1984. The northern end of Schwandorf station had to be rebuilt due to the realignment.

=== Schwandorf bypass ===
A south to east bypass curve was planned for Schwandorf in 2008 as part of the proposed Danube-Vltava Railway project, which was eventually canceled. This would have made it unnecessary to reverse trains running between Munich and Prague in Schwandorf station, allowing a reduction in travel times.

== Current operations ==
Regionalbahn services on the whole line are operated on behalf of the Upper Palatinate district by Vogtlandbahn with Siemens Desiro diesel railcars.

=== Line standards ===
The entire length of the route is double-track and not electrified. The maximum speed on the line has been 160 km/h since the line was upgraded for operations with tilting trains, which was completed in December 2005.

=== Rail services ===
The bi-hourly alex trains from Munich via Regensburg to Hof and Prague are coupled/uncoupled in Schwandorf.

Fares and services on the Regensburg – Weiden (Oberpf) section are set by the Regensburger Verkehrsverbund (Regensburg transport association, RVV).
