= Tradinno =

Giant, animatronic, fire-breathing dragon

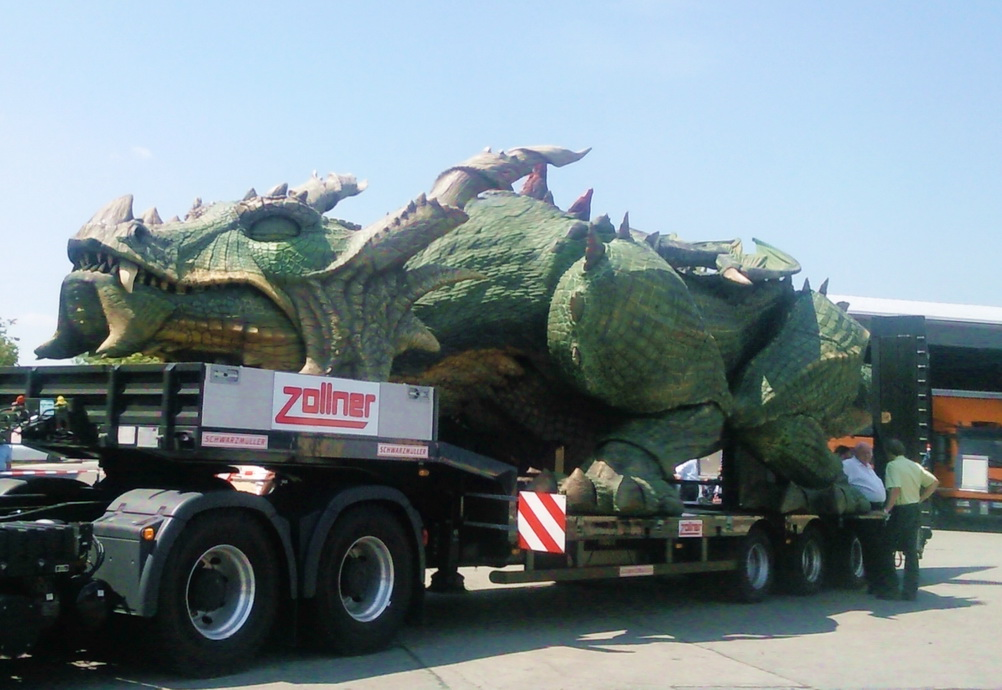
- Tradinno in transport
- Industry: Entertainment
- Dimensions: 15.72 m x 12.33 m x 8.20 m
- Weight: 11,000 Kg
- Fuel source: Diesel
- Powered: yes
- Self-propelled: yes
- Legs: 4
- Inventor: Zollner Elektronik AG

Tradinno is a giant, animatronic, fire-breathing dragon, featured in the 2014 Guinness Book of World Records as the world largest walking robot. It plays the Dragon in the play Drachenstich in the German town of Furth im Wald. The name Tradinno is a mix of Tradition and innovation.

== History ==
In 2001, it was decided that the old dragon prop in the play Drachenstich would be replaced with a new dragon. In 2002, Zollner Elektronik AG built a 1:4 scale concept design. The model was then showcased in a number of events. In February 2007, Zollner officially took up the project, and delivered the dragon on 2 July 2010. It has been used in the theater since 31 July 2010.

== Description ==
The dragon weighs 11 tons, and is remote-operated. It is powered by a 2.0-liter turbo-diesel engine with 140 horsepower. It has a 12-meter wingspan, although it does not fly, and a giant tail. It has over 1000 feet of hydraulic lines and over 4000 feet of electric wire. It employs about 250 sensors. It can contain 80 liters of stage blood and 11 liters of liquid gas that enable it to spit fire to over five feet. For transportation, a trailer for Tradinno was also built.
