= Irrenlohe station =

Railway station in Schwandorf, Germany

Irrenlohe Station
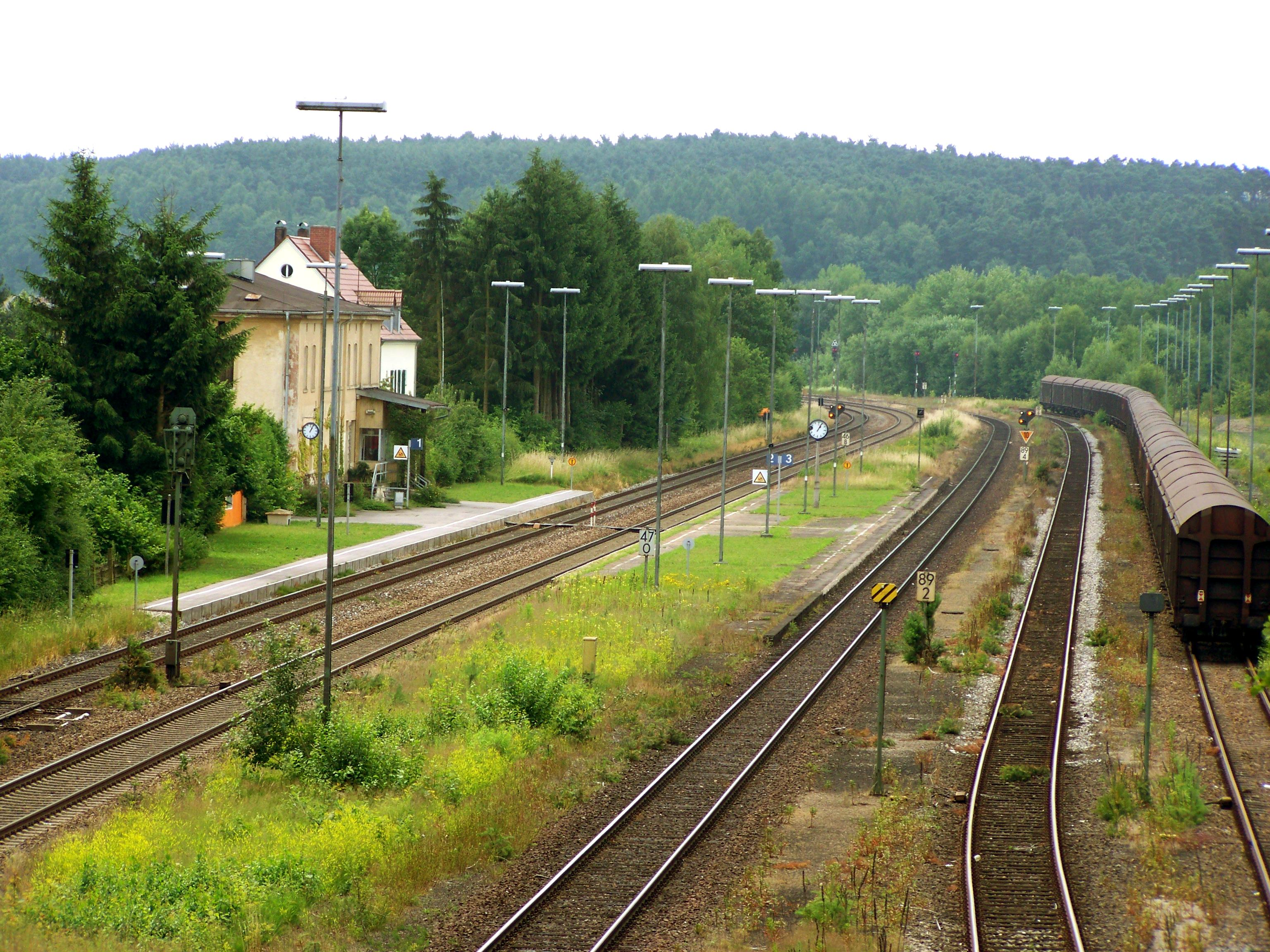
- 2009

General information
- Location: Irrlaching; 92421 Schwandorf; Bavaria; Germany
- Coordinates: 49.3627°N 12.1056°E
- Owner: DB Netz
- Operator: DB Station&Service
- Lines: Regensburg–Weiden railway (KBS 855); Nuremberg–Schwandorf railway (KBS 870)
- Platforms: 1 island platform 1 side platform
- Tracks: 5
- Train operators: oberpfalzbahn

Other information
- Station code: 3004
- DS100 code: NIR
- IBNR: 8003086
- Category: 6
- Fare zone: RVV: 7A and 7B
- Website: www.bahnhof.de

Services
| Preceding station | | Following station |
|---|---|---|
| Schwarzenfeld (Oberpfalz) towards Regensburg Hbf | RB 23 | Schwandorf towards Marktredwitz or Neustadt (Waldnaab) |
| Preceding station | DB Regio Bayern | Following station |
| Amberg towards Nürnberg Hbf | RE 43 Peak-time services | Schwandorf One-way operation |
| Amberg towards Nürnberg Hbf | RE 47 Peak-time services | Schwandorf towards Furth im Wald |
Location
- Location within Bavaria Location within Germany Location within Europe

Irrenlohe station is a railway station in the Irrlaching district of the municipality of Schwandorf, located in the Schwandorf district in Bavaria, Germany. It is classified as a category 6 station.

The station emerged with the establishment of the link from Regensburg to Nuremberg. When the branch line to Weiden was added, Irrenlohe became a minor transport hub. As a result the village was shelled in the Second World War. The reason the station is called "Irrenlohe" and not "Irlaching" is that the villagers of Irlaching had shown no real interest in a railway connection and so the building of the station was paid for by Irrenlohe.

The station has five main tracks, of which three are platform tracks. Passenger services are:

- Schwandorf–Regensburg (two-hourly, VBG)
- Weiden-Hof (two-hourly, VBG)

The composer Franz Schreker took the name of his opera Irrelohe ("Mad flames") from the station after his train stopped there.
