= Domažlice railway station =

Railway station in the Czech Republic

Domažlice
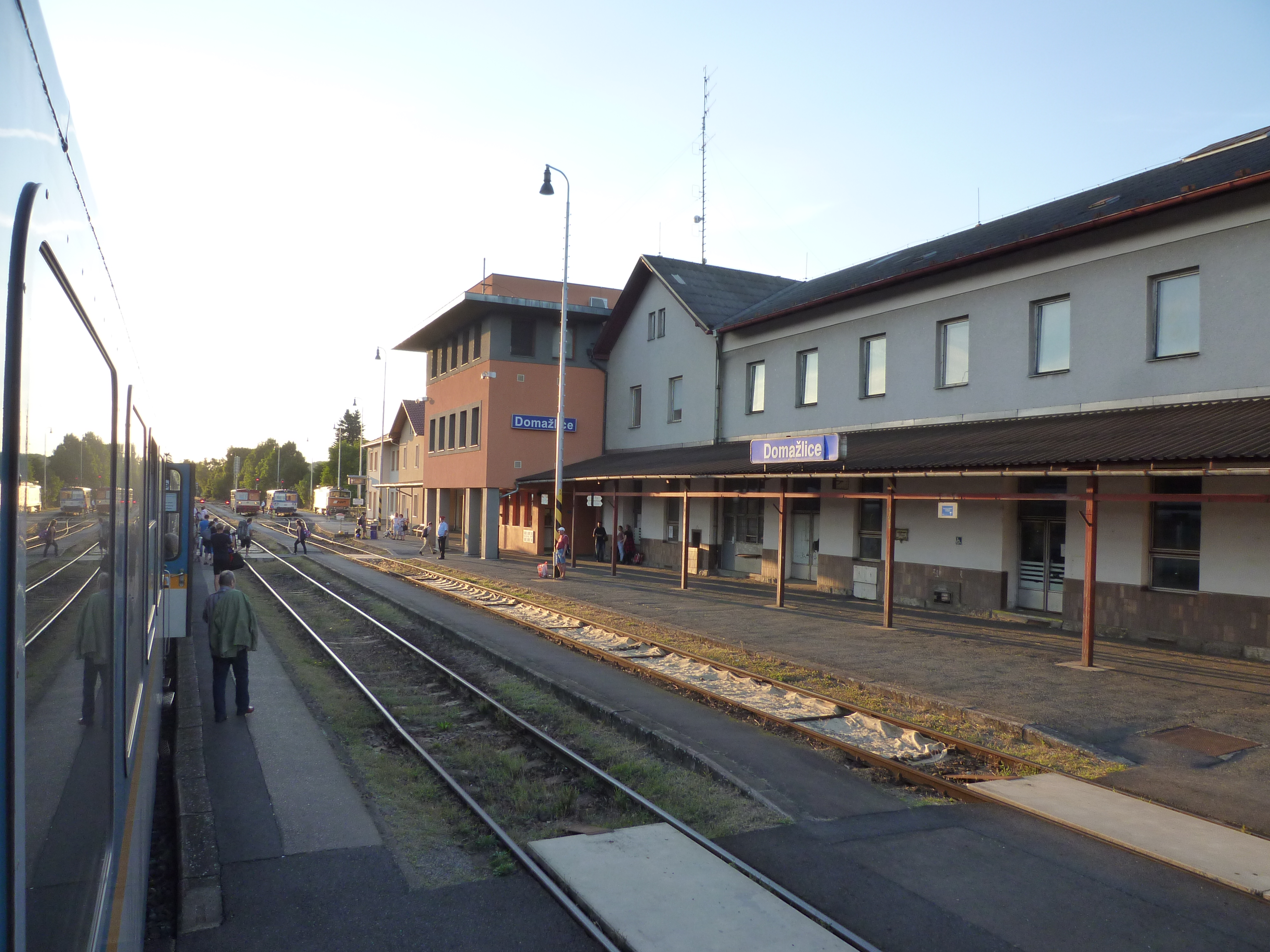
- Domažlice station in 2017

General information
- Location: Masarykova; 344 01 Domažlice; Czech Republic
- Coordinates: 49.4353°N 12.9433°E
- Elevation: 425 m (1,394 ft)
- Owner: Czech Republic
- Operator: Správa železnic
- Lines: Plzeň–Furth im Wald railway; Janovice nad Úhlavou–Domažlice railway; Domažlice–Planá u Mariánských Lázní railway
- Train operators: Arriva-Länderbahn-Express (alex); České dráhy; oberpfalzbahn
- Connections: RE 25; OPB 3

Construction
- Parking: yes
- Cycle facilities: yes
- Accessible: partly

Other information
- Station code: 54735159 -
- DS100 code: XTDO
- IBNR: 5400196
- Category: -

Services
Preceding station		Following station
Furth im Wald towards München Hbf	RE 25	Holysov towards Praha hl.n.
Preceding station		Following station
Domažlice mesto towards Schwandorf	RB 27	Terminus
Location
- Location within Czech Republic Location within Europe

Domažlice railway station (Czech: Železniční stanice Domažlice) is a railway station in the municipality of Domažlice, located in the Plzeň Region of the Czech Republic.

== History ==
The Domažlice railway station was opened in 1861 as part of the Plzeň–Furth im Wald line connecting Bohemia with Germany. The station underwent several modifications during the 20th century, including upgrades to the building, platforms, and signaling systems. Since 2020, works have been underway to modernize the line and infrastructure as part of a project aimed at improving the connection between Plzeň and the German border.
