= Furth im Wald station =

Railway station in Furth im Wald, Germany

Furth im Wald
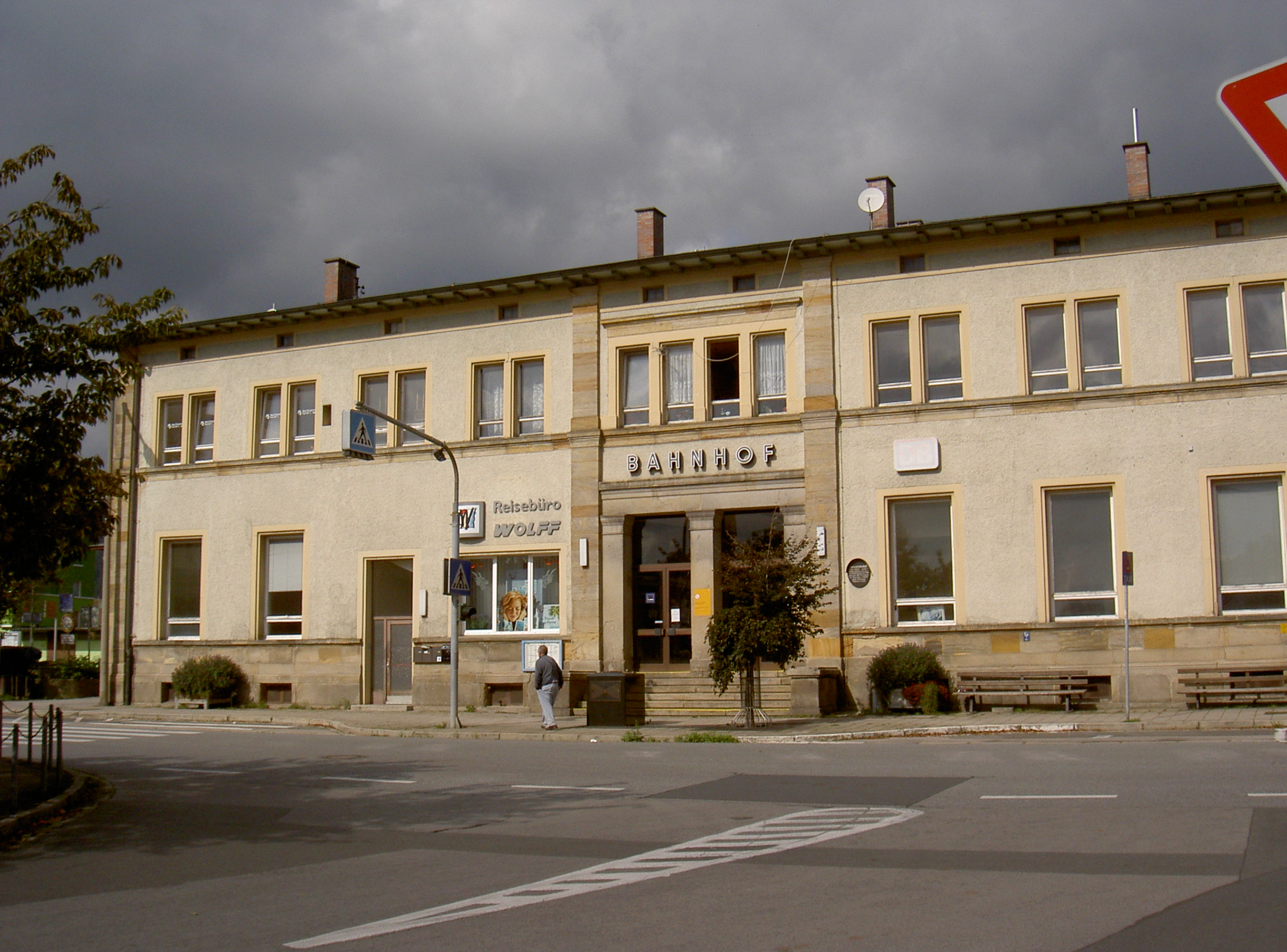
- 2014

General information
- Location: Bahnhofstraße 20; 93437 Furth im Wald; Bavaria; Germany
- Coordinates: 49.3097°N 12.8395°E
- Elevation: 404 m (1,325 ft)
- System: Bf
- Owner: Deutsche Bahn
- Operator: DB Station&Service
- Lines: Schwandorf–Furth im Wald railway (KBS 875); Plzeň–Furth im Wald railway
- Platforms: 1 island platform 1 side platform
- Tracks: 9
- Train operators: Arriva-Länderbahn-Express (alex); oberpfalzbahn
- Connections: RE 25; OPB 3

Construction
- Parking: yes
- Cycle facilities: yes
- Accessible: partly

Other information
- Station code: 1986
- DS100 code: NFW
- IBNR: 8002159
- Category: 5
- Fare zone: VLC
- Website: www.bahnhof.de

Services
Preceding station		Following station
Cham (Oberpf) towards München Hbf	RE 25	Domažlice towards Praha hl.n.
Preceding station		Following station
Arnschwang towards Schwandorf	RB 27	Ceska Kubice towards Domažlice
Location
- Location within Bavaria Location within Germany Location within Europe

Furth im Wald station is a railway station in the municipality of Furth im Wald, located in the Cham district in Bavaria, Germany.
