= Waldmünchen station =

Railway station in Waldmünchen, Germany

Waldmünchen
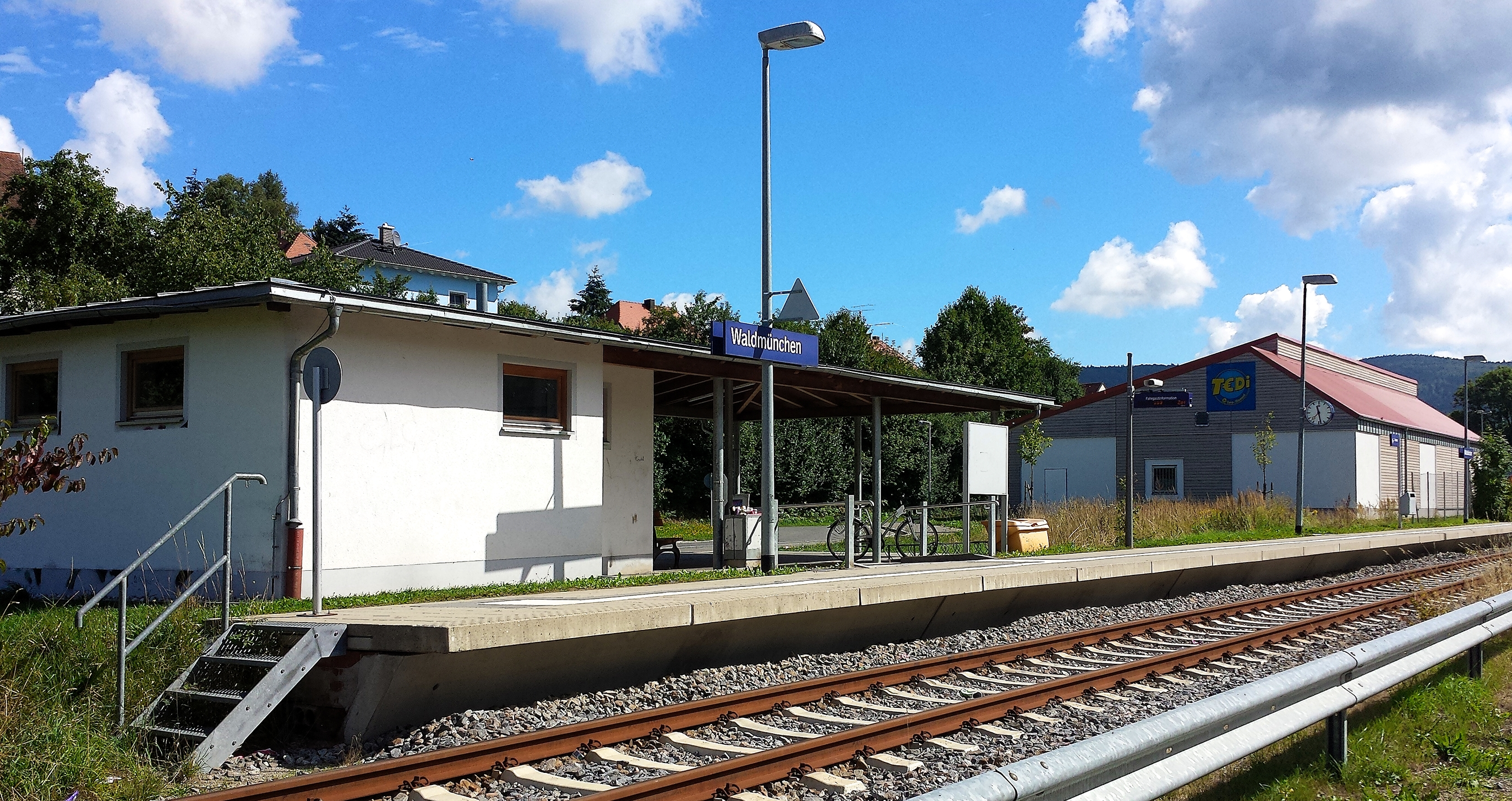
- 2013

General information
- Location: Heinrich-Eiber-Straße; 93443 Waldmünchen; Bavaria; Germany
- Coordinates: 49.3779°N 12.6961°E
- Elevation: 493 m (1,617 ft)
- System: Hp
- Owner: Deutsche Bahn
- Operator: DB Station&Service
- Lines: Cham–Waldmünchen railway (KBS 876)
- Platforms: 1 side platform
- Tracks: 1
- Train operators: oberpfalzbahn
- Connections: OPB 5

Construction
- Parking: yes
- Cycle facilities: yes
- Accessible: yes

Other information
- Station code: 6491
- DS100 code: NWLM
- IBNR: 8006163
- Category: 7
- Fare zone: VLC
- Website: www.bahnhof.de

Services
Preceding station		Following station
Grub (Oberpf) towards Cham (Oberpf)	RB 29	Terminus
Location
- Location within Bavaria Location within Germany Location within Europe

Waldmünchen station is a railway station in the municipality of Waldmünchen, located in the Cham district in Bavaria, Germany.
