= Amberg–Lauterhofen railway =

Former railway line in Germany

Overview
- Line number: 5064

Technical
- Line length: 28,4 km
- Track gauge: 1,435 mm (4 ft 8 1/2 in)

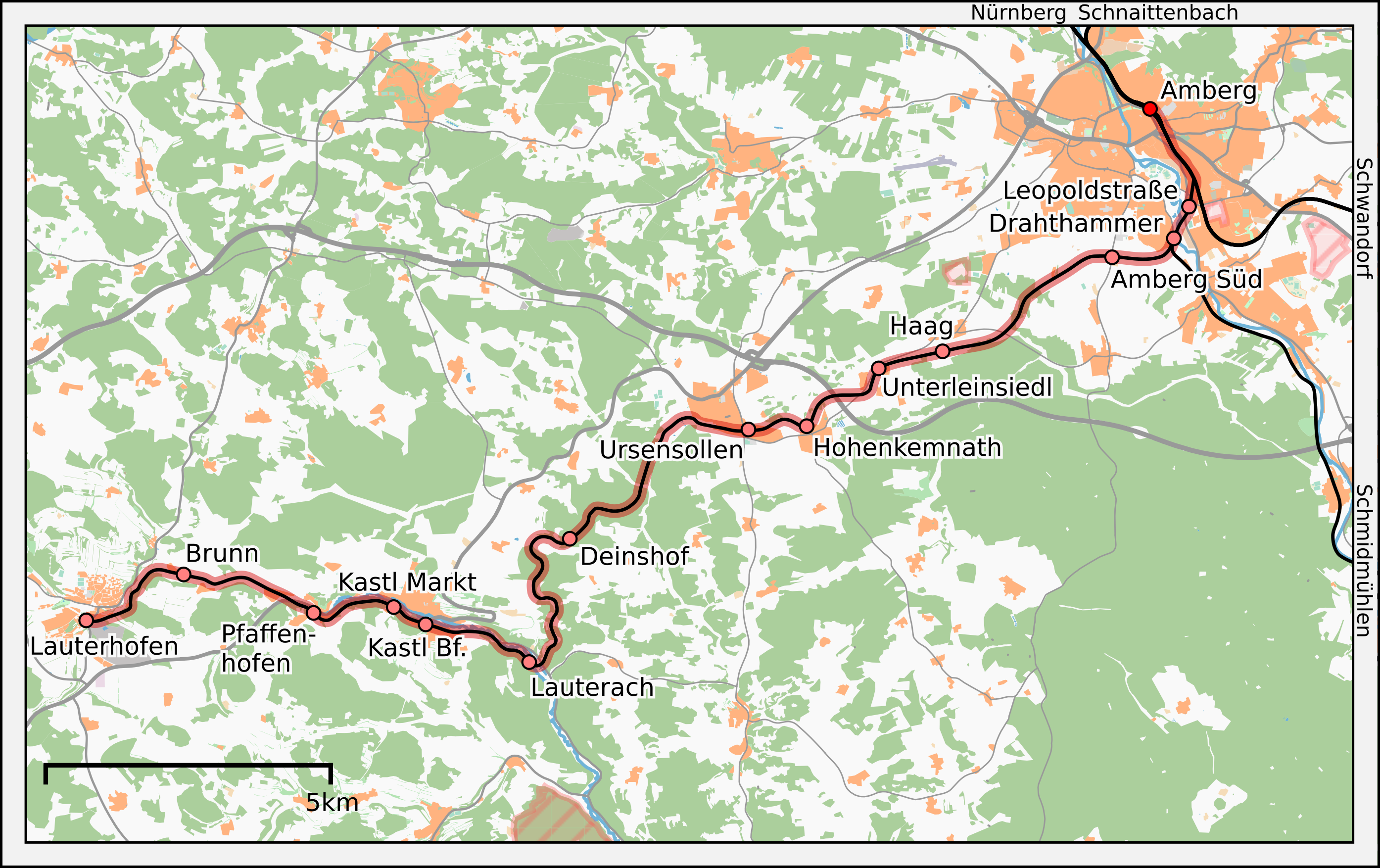
Map of the Amberg-Lauterhofen railway line

The Amberg–Lauterhofen railway, also known in the local dialect as the Lauterhöfer Bockl or Lauterhof Goat, was a 28 kilometres (17 mi) long branch line in the state of Bavaria in southern Germany and primarily linked Amberg with two communities which at that time came under the district council of Neumarkt. The line was opened on 7 December 1903 by the Royal Bavarian State Railways.

The route initially ran for a short way parallel to the Nuremberg–Schwandorf railway, crossed the River Vils and turned westwards at Drahthammer station whilst still within the Amberg town limits. Crossing the heathland of the Köferinger Heide it entered the landscape of the Franconian Jura where it climbed up quite steep inclines into the Lauterach valley, which it then followed upstream to Markt Kastl, dominated by an impressive monastery (Klosterburg). At the terminal station of Lauterhofen a quarry provided additional custom on top of the usual freight from an otherwise heavily agricultural region. In spite of that, goods services officially closed on 1 April 1972. The last goods train had already left on 29 March 1972.

Passenger services on the line were withdrawn as early as 1 July 1962. Even before the Second World War Kastl and Lauterhofen had established a postal service by road to their district town of Neumarkt, which had later been expanded into the Amberg–Neumarkt bus service. This development could not even be prevented by the use of early railbuses, that had been in service since the 1930s, and which were replaced in the 1950s by the Class VT 98s.

The trackbed was eventually dismantled and is nowadays a cycle path.

== See also ==
- Royal Bavarian State Railways
- Bavarian branch lines
- List of closed railway lines in Bavaria

== Sources ==
- Gerald Hoch, Andreas Kuhfahl: Nebenbahnen in der Oberpfalz. 1. Auflage 2000. Resch-Verlag, Neustadt bei Coburg, 2000, ISBN 3-9805967-7-X.
