= Amberg–Schnaittenbach railway =

Railway line in Germany

Overview
- Line number: 5062

Technical
- Line length: 21.5 km (13.4 mi)
- Track gauge: 1,435 mm (4 ft 8 1/2 in)

The Amberg–Schnaittenbach railway, also known in the local dialect as the Hirschauer Bockl or Hirschau Goat, is a 22 kilometre long branch line in the county of Amberg-Sulzbach in the state of Bavaria, southern Germany. It was opened on 8 October 1898 by the Royal Bavarian State Railways.

The line leaves Amberg and initially follows the River Vils uphill before bending eastwards and reaching its terminal station at Schnaittenbach via the village of Hirschau. At Schnaittenbach there are still three kaolin pits today which have secured the survival of the railway to date. In previous decades it had, from time to time, the highest goods volumes of all Bavarian branch lines and was assessed as the "most operationally efficient network" in the Deutsche Bundesbahn. In the period after the Second World War there were unsuccessful attempts to build a line from Schnaittenbach into the Naab valley to a junction at Wernberg, which would have considerably shortened the distance by rail to the porcelain factories in Upper Franconia who were the main customers of kaolin production. Since 1996 kaolin transportation has been the only task of this railway.

Passenger services, which were provided for many years by three to four pairs of trains per day, suffered early on from competition with the railway's own buses and then with private motor vehicles. After 1960 they reduced to just one pair of trains for school runs and on 30 May 1976 passenger services ended entirely.

== See also ==
- Royal Bavarian State Railways
- Bavarian branch lines
- List of closed railway lines in Bavaria

== Sources ==
- Gerald Hoch, Andreas Kuhfahl: Nebenbahnen in der Oberpfalz. 1. Auflage 2000. Resch-Verlag, Neustadt bei Coburg, 2000, ISBN 3-9805967-7-X.
