= Schwandorf–Furth im Wald railway =

Railway line in Germany

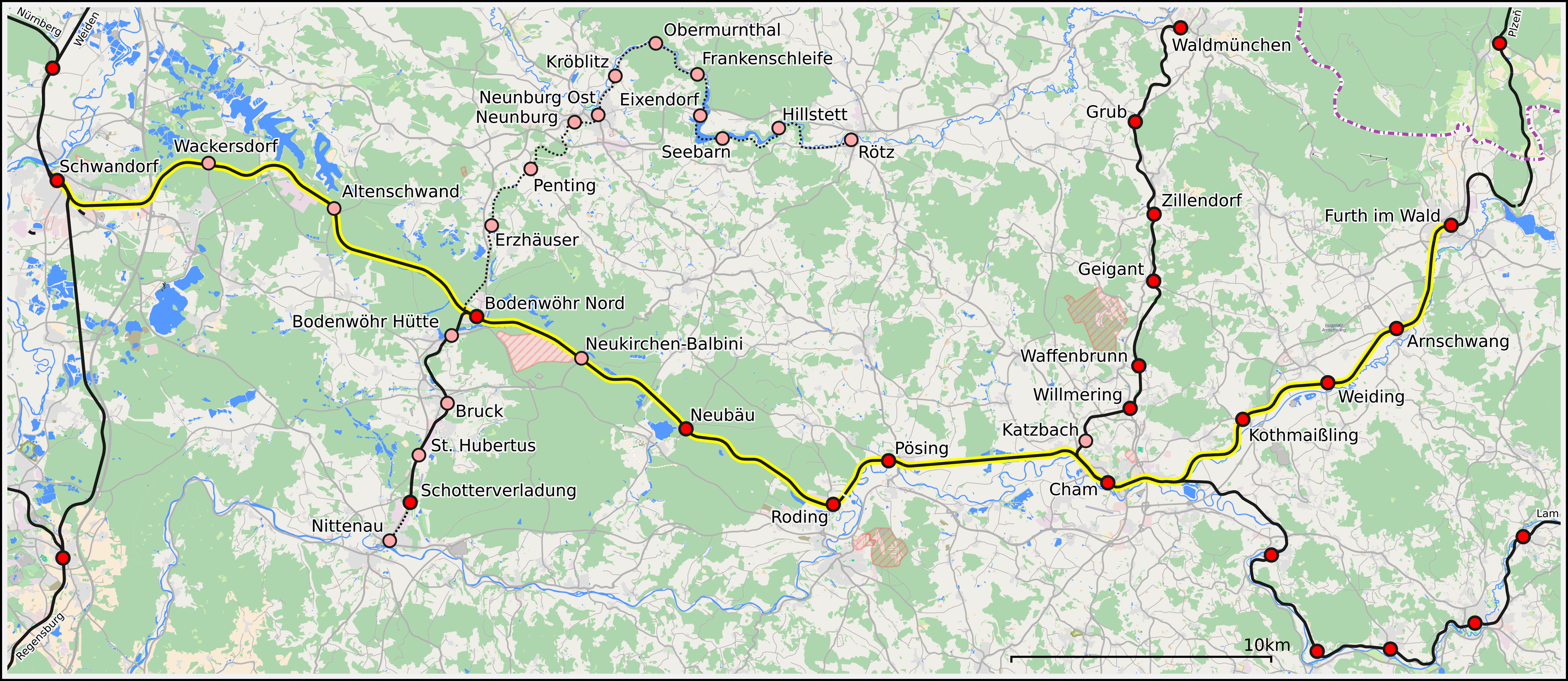

Overview
- Line number: 5800
- Locale: Bavaria, Germany

Service
- Route number: 875

Technical
- Line length: 67.2 km (41.8 mi)
- Number of tracks: 1
- Track gauge: 1,435 mm (4 ft 8 1/2 in) standard gauge
- Operating speed: 160

The Schwandorf–Furth im Wald railway is a 67 km long mainline railway in the German state of Bavaria. It runs from Schwandorf via Cham to Furth im Wald. It is part of a long-distance connection between Germany and the Czech Republic.

== History ==
The Bavarian Eastern Railway Company (German: Königlich privilegirte Actiengesellschaft der bayerischen Ostbahnen) received a license from King Maximilian II to build the line on 12 April 1856. The first section from Schwandorf to Cham was opened five years later, on 7 January 1861. The section between Cham and Furth im Wald was opened on 20 September 1861. A month later, on 15 October 1861, the Plzeň–Furth im Wald line reached Furth station, completing a continuous link between Nuremberg and Prague. 15 years after the opening of the line, the Bavarian Eastern Railway was nationalised and the line became part of the Royal Bavarian State Railways. Four branch lines were built, connecting to the line. The first two lines branched off from Cham station, one to Lam (opened in 1891) and the other to Waldmünchen (opened on 1 August 1895). In Bodenwöhr Nord the branch to Rötz was opened on 3 August 1896 and on 5 November 1907 the branch to Nittenau followed.

From 2001, services were operated by Regentalbahn AG (RAG) under the name of Oberpfalzbahn on behalf of DB Regio. After winning the tender let by the Bayerische Eisenbahngesellschaft in 2011, Regentalbahn has been operating this line directly on behalf of the contracting authority since December 2014. In addition to the Regio-Shuttles sets previously operated, Pesa LINK II two-car diesel multiple units would have been used. Due to licensing problems, however, the LINK II sets were not used and Alstom Lint 41 sets, which had been acquired since mid-2016 for other routes of the Oberpfalzbahn network, are used.

Due to the low traffic volumes on the Nuremberg–Prague route, long-distance traffic was discontinued in 2012 on the route and replaced by long-distance buses.

From July to December 2014, the platform of Roding station was moved to the west and a bus stop was built for transfers between buses and trains at the new location. This was done in cooperation between DB Station&Service and Verkehrsbetrieben Roding. The new island platform is 170 m long and has a platform height of 55 cm above the rail. The previously ground-level platform access was replaced by a pedestrian overpass, so no passenger safety measures are now required.

== Route ==
The line leaves Schwandorf station and passes under the A 93 autobahn to the east. In the Wackersdorf area, the Upper Palatinate lakeland lies to the right of the line; these lakes have been developed since 1982 from the excavations created by the mining of brown coal. From Altenschwand the line runs through the Upper Bavarian Forest Nature Park (Naturpark Oberer Bayerischer Wald), passes through the Taxölderner forest and reached the former Bodenwöhr railway junction, where the now disused railway line to Rötz branched off.

The line to Nittenau, which is now used only for freight, also branches off in Bodenwöhr.

The line then runs through Neubäuer forest and meets the Regen river near Roding and follows it to Cham. Near Chammünster the line branches off the line to Lam to the north east and follows the Chamb through the Cham-Further depression to Furth im Wald and continues to Plzeň.

=== Development stage ===
The line is entirely single track and non-electrified. In the short term it is planned to carry out small improvements to straighten the line to Plzeň. There are also proposals to rebuild the line between Roding and Furth im Wald as part of a line known as the Danube–Vltava railway, a high-speed line between Munich and Prague.

== Operations ==
Until the 1970s, most of the traffic on this line was steam-hauled. Several classes of locomotives that were originally built for Bavarian State Railways and Deutsche Reichsbahn were used on the line. Various Czech steam locomotives ran to Furth im Wald. In the 1950s the first diesel locomotive was used on this route.

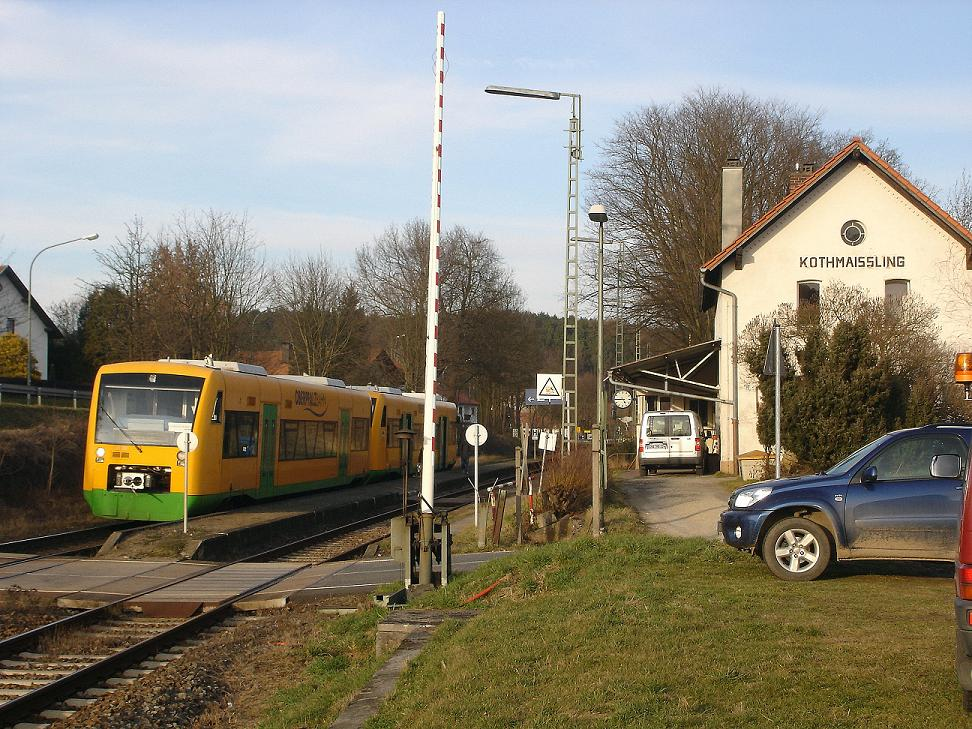
Regio-Shuttle in Kothmaißling station

Regionalbahn services on this line are operated with Stadler Regio-Shuttle RS1 diesel railcars. Regional-Express services consist of two DB Regio Bayern train pairs between Nuremberg and Furth im Wald, which are operated with tilting class 612 diesel multiple units. Seven pairs of express trains are operated by alex between Munich and Prague.

Rail services on the line are part of the Regionalzügenetz Ostbayern ("regional rail network of Eastern Bavaria"), which is managed by the Bayerische Eisenbahngesellschaft ("Bavarian Railway Company"), with operations run under contract. Regentalbahn won the most recent tender.
