= Furth im Wald =

- Town
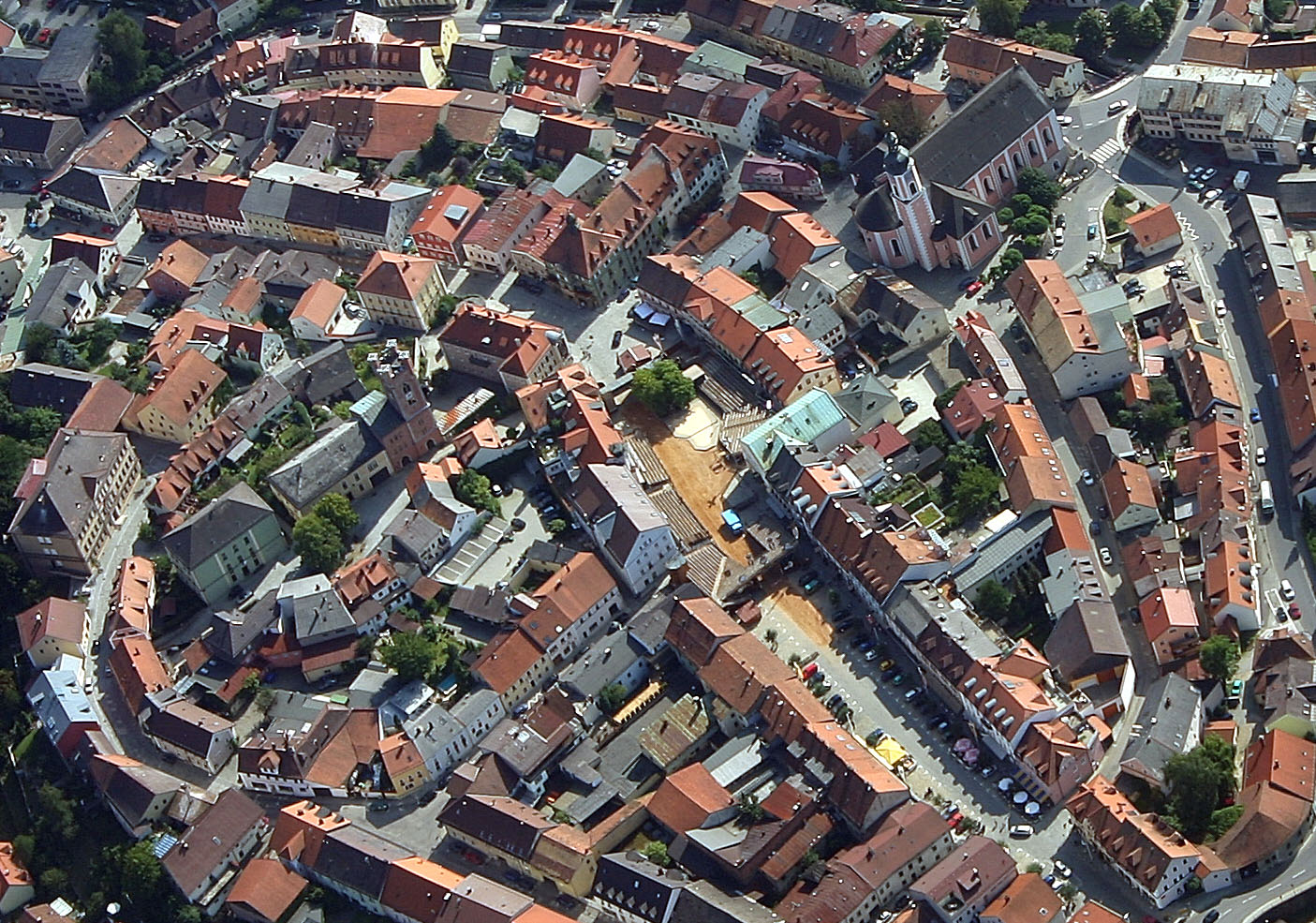

- Coat of arms

- Location of Furth im Wald within Cham district
- Interactive map of Furth im Wald
- Location within Germany Location within Bavaria
- Coordinates: 49°18′35″N 12°50′24″E
- Country: Germany
- State: Bavaria
- Admin. region: Upper Palatinate
- District: Cham

Government
  - Mayor (2020–26): Sandro Bauer (CSU)

Area
  - Total: 67.06 km^{2} (25.89 sq mi)
- Elevation: 407 m (1,335 ft)

Population (2025-12-31)
  - Total: 8,525
  - Density: 127.1/km^{2} (329.3/sq mi)
- Time zone: UTC+01:00 (CET)
  - Summer (DST): UTC+02:00 (CEST)
- Postal codes: 93437
- Dialling codes: 0 99 73
- Vehicle registration: CHA
- Website: www.furth.de

Furth im Wald (German pronunciation: [ˈfʊʁt ʔɪm ˈvalt], lit. 'Furth in the Forest'; Czech: Brod nad Lesy or Bavorský Brod) is a town in Bavaria, Germany, near the Czech border in the Bavarian Forest, 16 kilometres (9.9 miles) northeast of Cham, and 17 kilometres (11 miles) southwest of Domažlice. The city is known as Drachenstadt (Dragon City), a reference to Furth im Wald's annual Drachenstich (Slaying of the Dragon) play. The Drachenstich, originally part of a Corpus Christi procession, was first mentioned in 1590. As one of the oldest folk plays in the German language, each year actors re-enact the legend of Saint George slaying the dragon. In 2010, the play became notable for using the world's largest walking robot, an animatronic dragon called Tradinno.

== Twin towns ==
Furth im Wald is twinned with:

- Ludres, France
- Furth bei Göttweig, Austria
- Domažlice, Czech Republic

== Gallery ==
Photographs from the Drachenstich

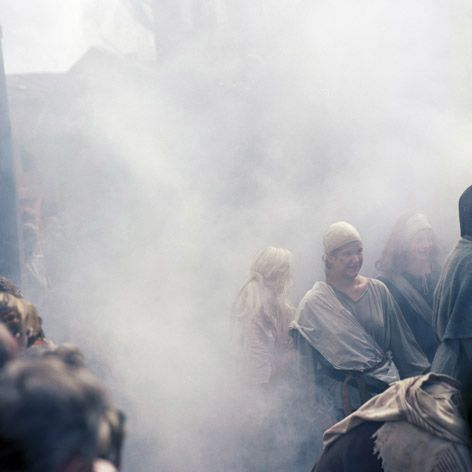

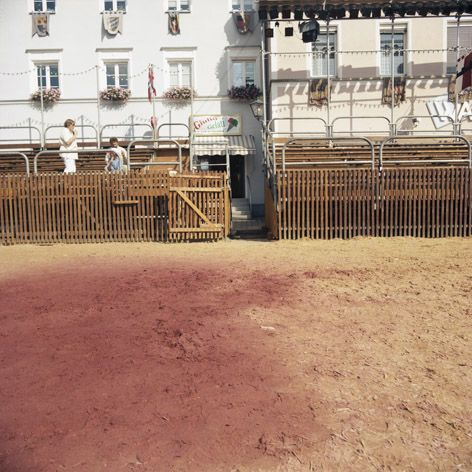

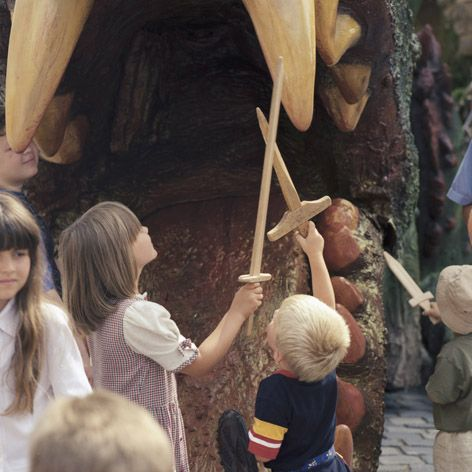

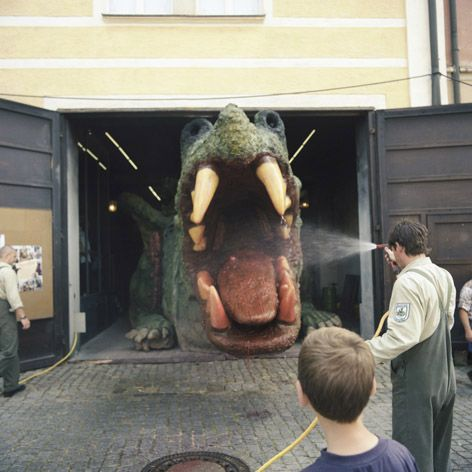

== Sons and daughters of the town ==
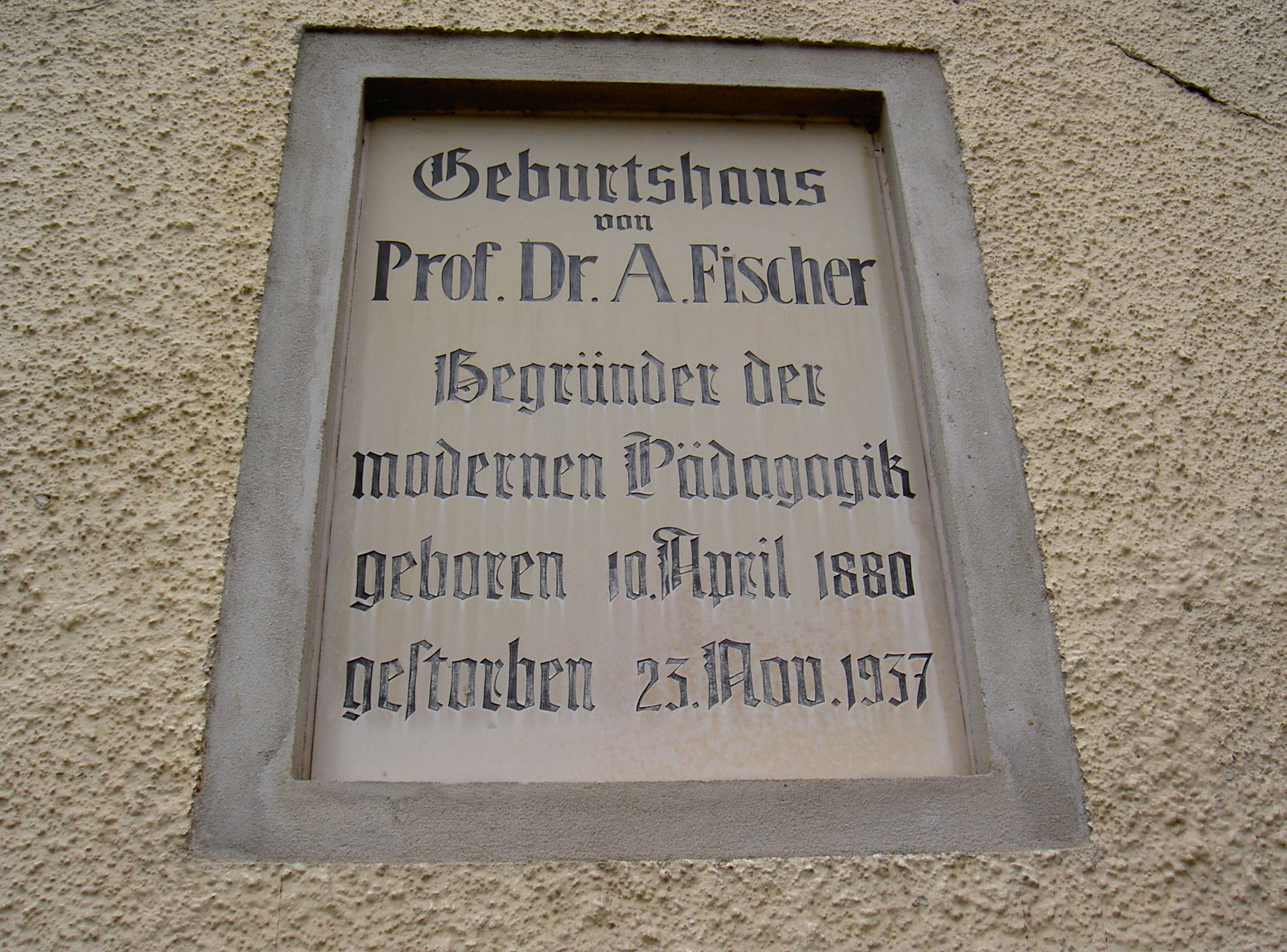
Memorial plate Aloys Fischer in Furth

- Aloys Fischer (1880–1937), educator
- Helmut Sturm (1932–2008), painter, member of the group SPUR, from 1980 to 1982 guest professor at the Berlin University of the Arts
- Willibald Utz (1893–1954), officer, most recently Generalleutnant in the Second World War
- Wolfgang Wagner (1884–1931), painter
