= Rohrbach (Ilm) station =

Railway station in Bavaria, Germany

Rohrbach (Ilm)
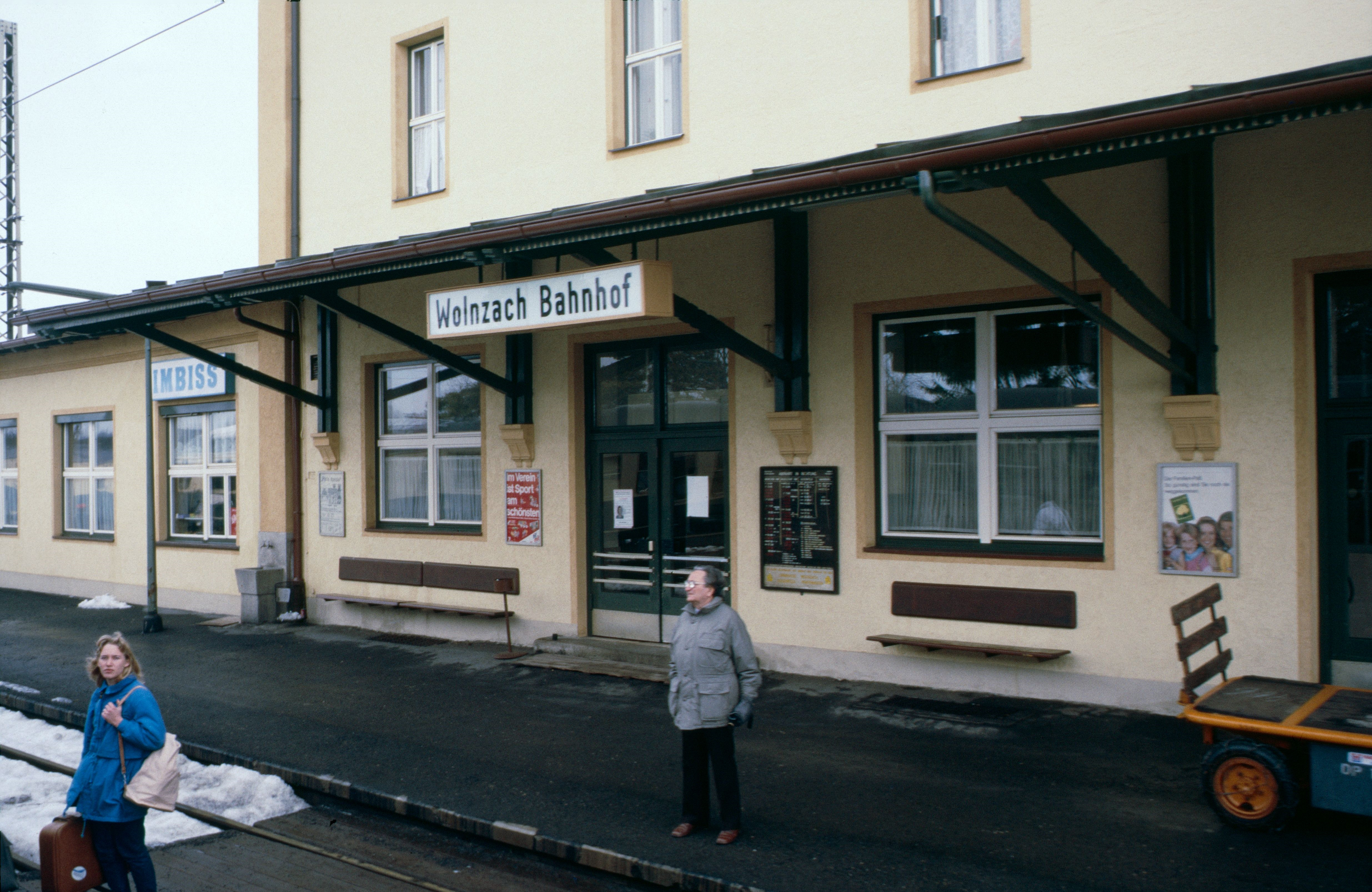
- 1988

General information
- Location: Ladehofstraße 7; 85296 Rohrbach; Bavaria; Germany
- Coordinates: 48°36′22″N 11°34′24″E
- Elevation: 420 m (1,380 ft)
- System: Bf
- Owner: Deutsche Bahn
- Operator: DB InfraGO
- Lines: Munich–Treuchtlingen railway (KBS 900); Hallertau Local Railway; Wolnzach–Geisenfeld
- Platforms: 2 side platforms
- Tracks: 4
- Train operators: DB Regio Bayern
- Connections: 9201

Construction
- Parking: yes
- Cycle facilities: yes
- Accessible: yes

Other information
- Station code: 6874
- DS100 code: MRBI
- IBNR: 8000256
- Category: 5
- Fare zone: VGI: 543
- Website: www.bahnhof.de

Services
Preceding station	DB Regio Bayern	Following station
Ingolstadt Hbf towards Nürnberg Hbf	RE 1	Pfaffenhofen (Ilm) towards München Hbf
Baar-Ebenhausen towards Nürnberg Hbf	RB 16	Pfaffenhofen (Ilm) towards München Hbf
Location

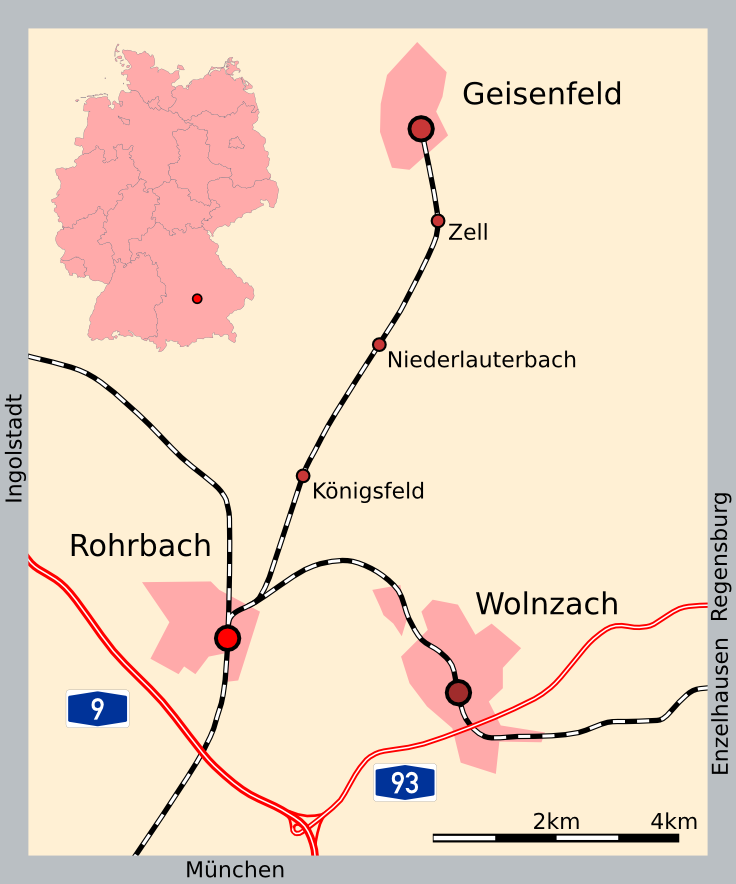
Location of Rohrbach (Ilm) station

Rohrbach (Ilm) station (German: Bahnhof Rohrbach (Ilm)) is a railway station in the town of Rohrbach, in Bavaria, Germany. Until 2000, it was called Wolnzach Bahnhof after the larger town Wolnzach five kilometers to the east.
