= Kinding (Altmühltal) station =

Railway station in Germany

Kinding (Altmühltal)
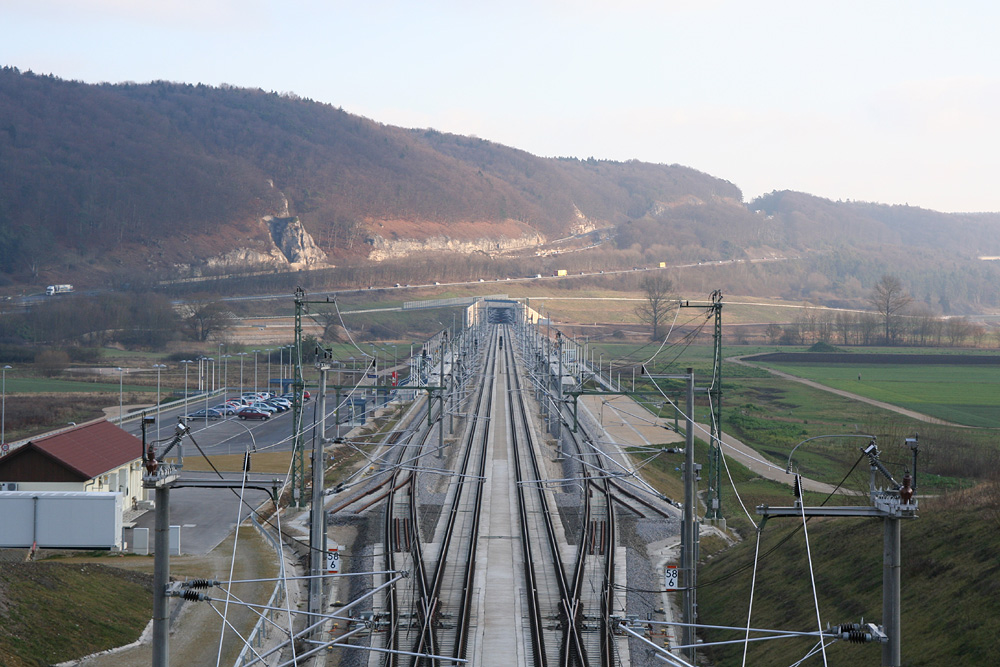
- The station looking towards the Irlahüll Tunnel

General information
- Location: Iblinger Straße 11, Kinding, Bavaria; Germany
- Coordinates: 48°59′30″N 11°22′39″E
- Lines: Nuremberg–Ingolstadt high-speed railway (KBS 901)
- Platforms: 2

Construction
- Accessible: Yes

Other information
- Station code: 4245
- DS100 code: MKIG
- IBNR: 8003256
- Category: 6
- Fare zone: VGN: 1687; VGI: 724 (VGN transitional tariff); 7
- Website: www.bahnhof.de; stationsdatenbank.de

History
- Opened: 10 December 2006

Services
Preceding station	DB Regio Bayern	Following station
Allersberg (Rothsee) towards Nürnberg Hbf	RE 1	Ingolstadt Nord towards München Hbf
Location
- Location within Bavaria Location within Germany Location within Europe

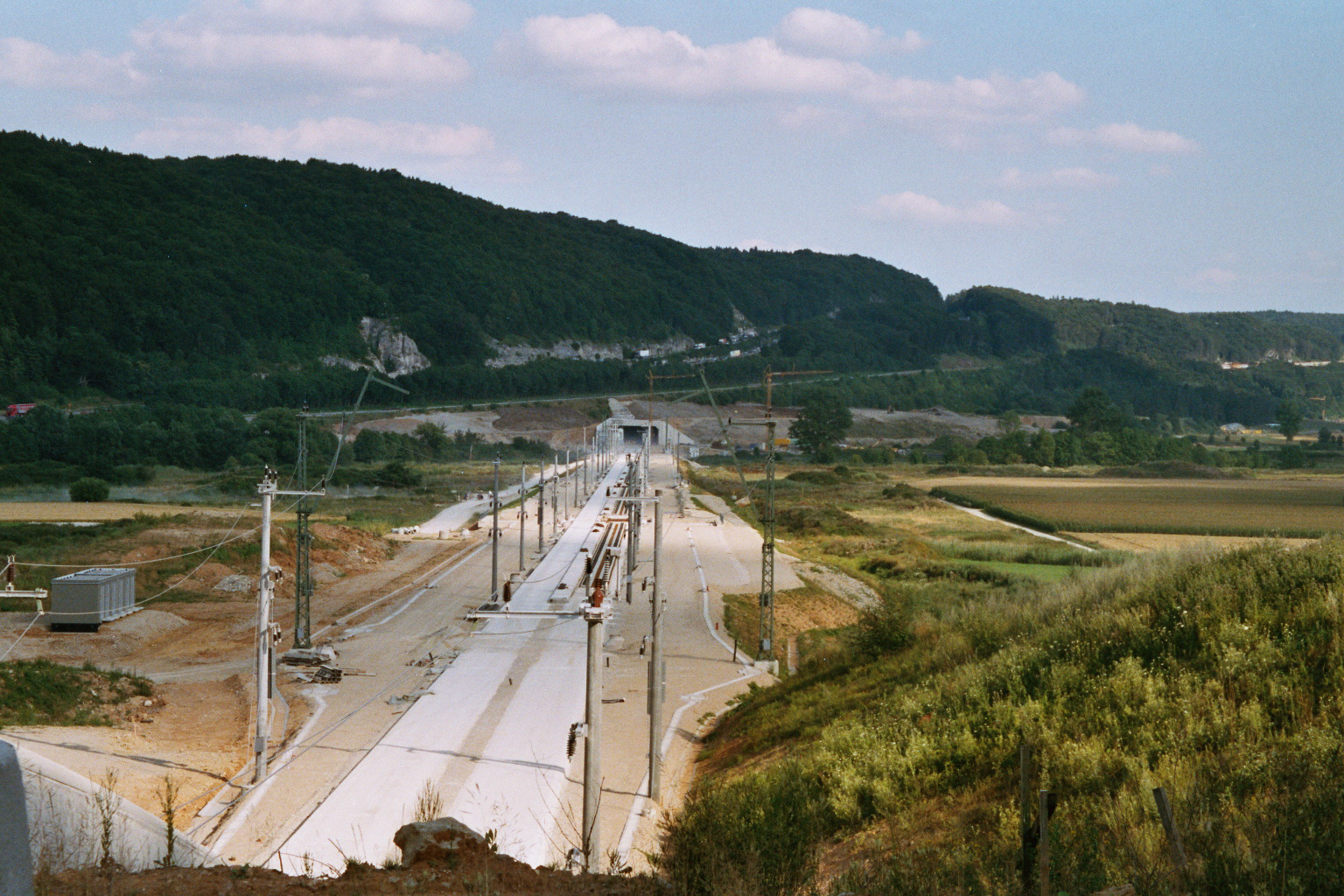
The station under construction in July 2004

Kinding (Altmühltal) station is a regional station on the Nuremberg–Ingolstadt high-speed railway in the German state of Bavaria. It is located west of the Upper Bavarian market town of Kinding, near the A 9 at the 58.6 mark (measured from Nuremberg). It is, along with the stations of Allersberg and Ingolstadt Nord, one of three regional stations of the new line between Nuremberg and Ingolstadt. The complex is located between the Schellenberg Tunnel (650 m) to the north and the Irlahüll Tunnel (7260 m) to the south.

The station was ceremoniously opened on 6 December 2006 and has been served by trains since 10 December 2006. It has 2 platform tracks and is classified by Deutsche Bahn as a category 6 station.

== Services ==
A fast Regional-Express service, called the München-Nürnberg-Express, which runs at up to 200 km/h towards Nuremberg or Munich at two-hour intervals, has stopped at Kinding station since the timetable change on 10 December 2006. Until then, only Intercity-Express trains ran on the line and passed through the station without stopping. Platform 1 (which is east of the main tracks) is served by trains to Nuremberg, while platform 4 (which is west of the main tracks) is served by trains to Ingolstadt and Munich.

Train class	Route	Frequency
RE 1	München-Nürnberg-Express; Nuremberg – Allersberg – Kinding – Ingolstadt – Munich	Every 2 hours

== Infrastructure ==
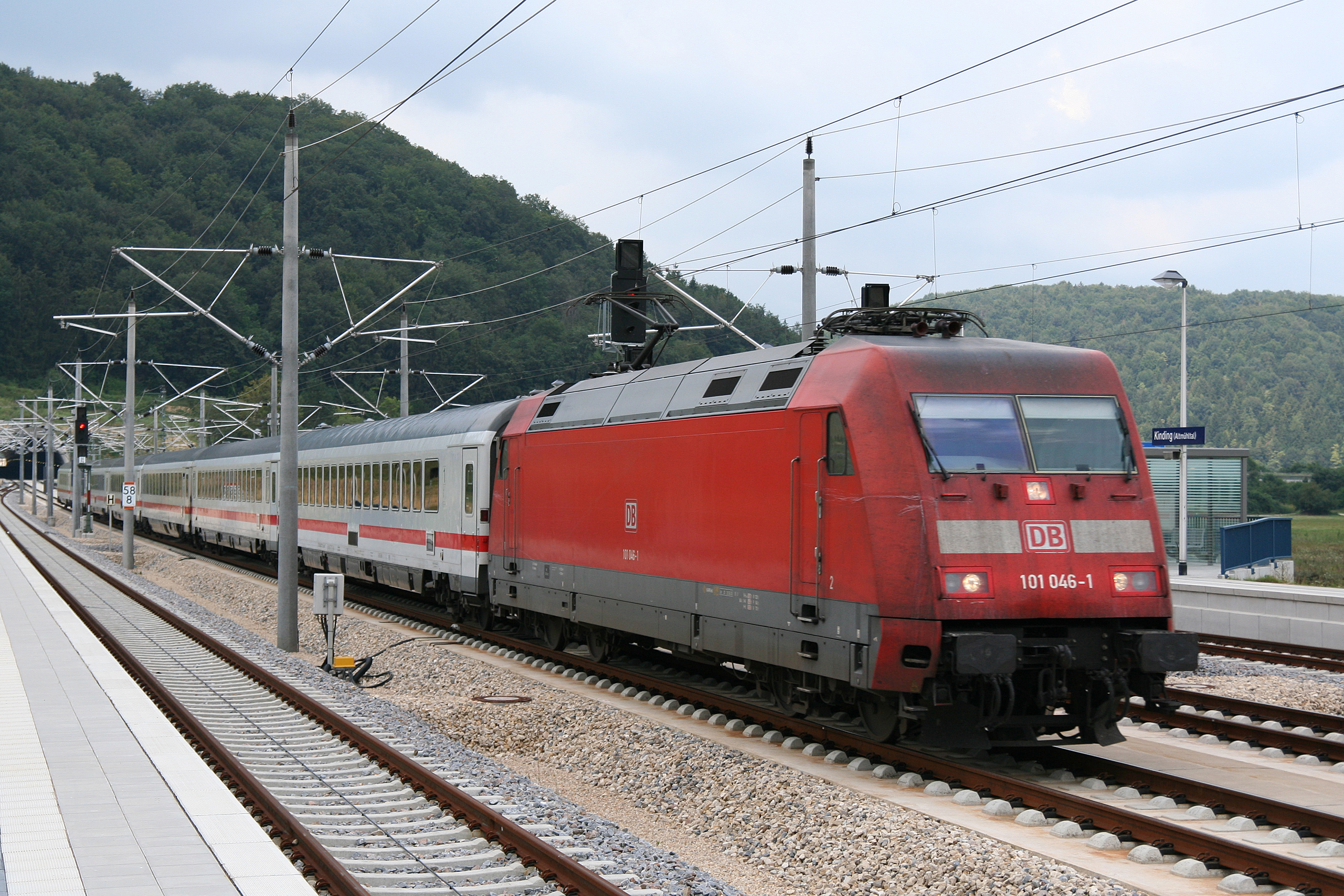
An InterCity service running past Kinding station without stopping towards Nuremberg

The four-track railway station is about a kilometre from the Altmuehltal exit from the A 9 autobahn. It has a park-and-ride car park with 100 spaces for cars and has several lay-bys for buses. From there, a ramp leads to platform 1, while an underpass connects to platform 4, which has a ramp at each end.

There is no entrance building at the station. The only building at the station houses a unit of the line's electronic interlocking system.

=== Tracks ===
The station has two through tracks that are passable at 300 km/h and are formed of slab track with UIC 60 kg/m rails. It is not necessary for through trains to slow down. Stopping trains can run at a maximum of 100 km/h through the outer tracks to the two platforms. At the northern end of the station towards Schellenberg Tunnel there is a crossover with four sets of points, which can be crossed by trains that are branching off at 130 km/h.

Each platform was originally 170 metres long and later extended to 186 metres. The two platform tracks are built as conventional ballasted track with S54 rail profile and can also serve as passing loops to allow trains with higher priority to overtake. The platforms each have a shelter fitted with six seats.

=== Altmühl bridge ===
Before entering the Irlahüll Tunnel, the four-track line crosses the Altmühl (at the 59.4 km mark). The 79-metre-long (259 ft) and 26.15-metre-wide (85.8 ft) bridge consists of two parallel, continuous beams, each accommodating two tracks. The spans of the beams, which were built as two-piece hollow boxes with a height of 2 m, are 24.5 + 30 m + 24.5 m.

The oblique transition between the bridge and the embankment is noteworthy. The longitudinal axis of the bridge and the axis of the bridge bearing in the transverse direction forms an angle of 60 degrees. The Federal Railway Authority issued a special permit for this angled transition between the bridge and the embankment.

The bridge and the associated works was built in 20 months.

== History ==
The plan as of mid-1994 was for an overtaking loop that could be developed into a regional station if required. North and south of the station four sets of points were planned, allowing changes between each track. In 1999 it was decided to build a local station at the request of the state of Bavaria.

=== Construction ===
The station was built as part of the contract for the central section of the new line, which was built by Hochtief.

=== "Closing the gap" ceremony ===
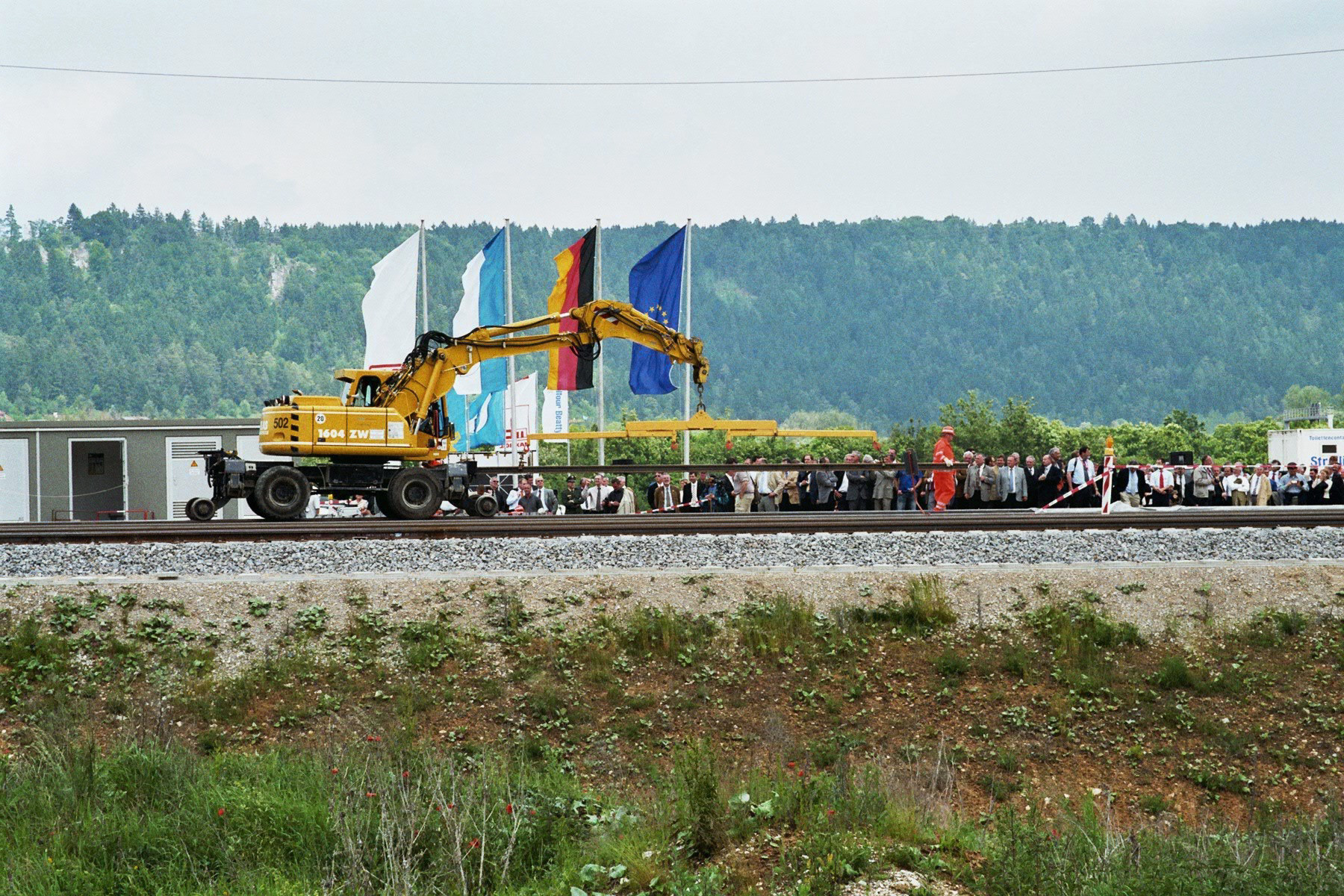
”Closing the gap” ceremony on 13 May 2005

On 13 June 2005, a “closing the gap" ceremony was carried out on the eastern platform to celebrate the insertion and welding of the last piece of track on the high-speed line. For this purpose, an 11-metre-long piece of track on the northern part of platform 1 was cut out and placed by an excavator in the adjacent Schellenberg Tunnel before the ceremony. A few hours later it was restored in the presence of several hundred guests. The corresponding weld can still be seen near the signal box building.

== Operations ==
On 4 August 2011, a Velaro E set reached a speed of 352 km/h in Kinding station during a test run.

=== World record ceremony on 2 September 2006 ===
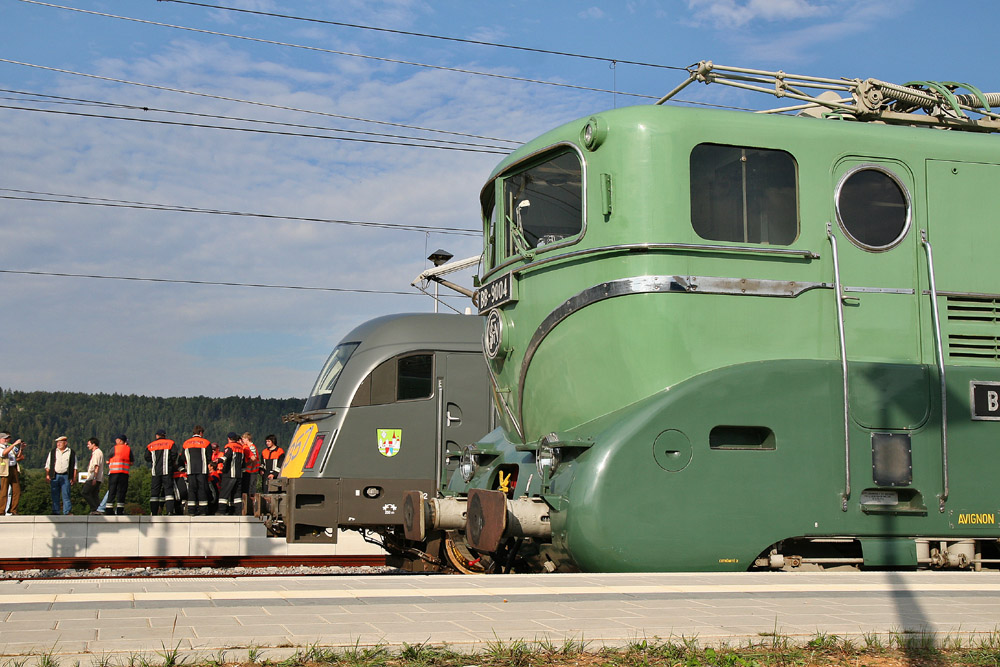
Old and new record-breaking locomotives in the station

On 2 September 2006 there was a celebration in the station for the 357 km/h world record of a EuroSprinter locomotive. In addition to the locomotive that set the world record, the French locomotives CC 7107 and BB 9004m, which set world records on 28 and 29 March 1955, were displayed on the western platform.

== Remains of former Kinding station ==
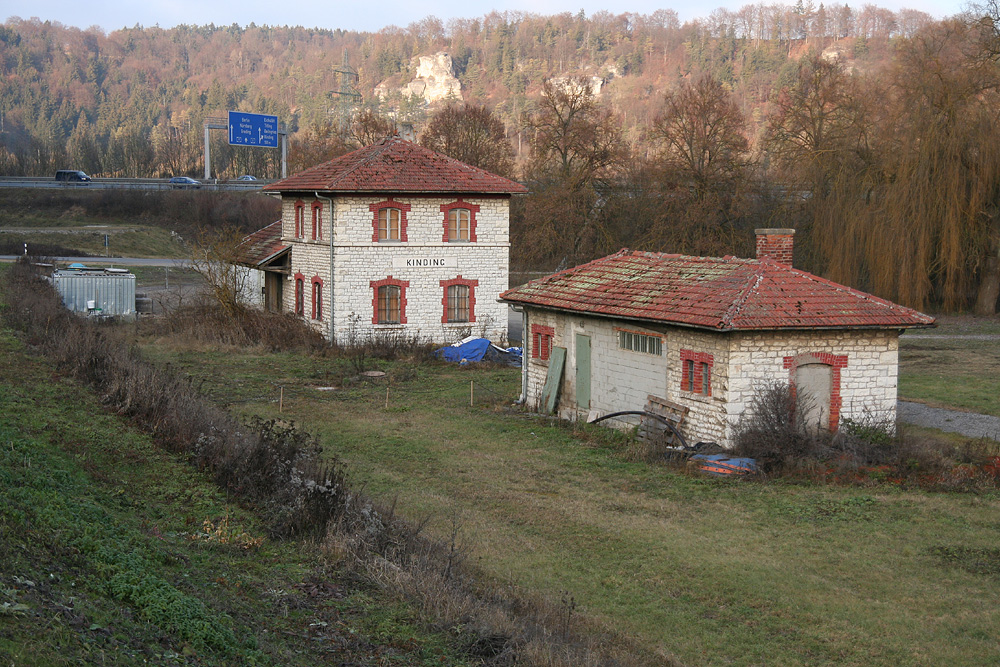
The old station building of the former Kinding station

In the immediate vicinity below the current station is the historic station building of Kinding station on the former Eichstätt–Beilngries railway. Passenger services on the local section between Beilngries and Kipfenberg were closed on 2 October 1955. The section was closed on 3 June 1970 and is now dismantled. The old station building is still being used and maintained by a local tennis club.
