= Munich–Treuchtlingen railway =

Railway line in Germany

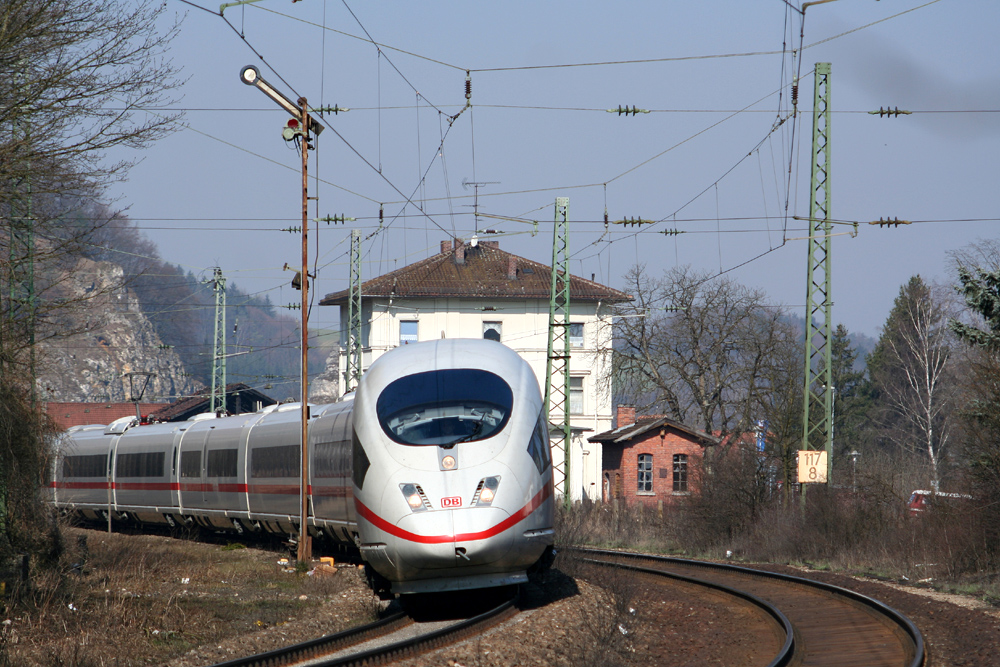

Overview
- Status: Operational
- Owner: Deutsche Bahn
- Line number: 5501
- Locale: Bavaria, Germany
- Termini: Munich; Treuchtlingen

Service
- Type: Heavy rail, Passenger/freight rail Regional rail, Intercity rail
- Route number: 900 (Munich–Ingolstadt); 990 (Ingolstadt–Treuchtlingen)
- Operator(s): DB Bahn

History
- Opened: 14 November 1867

Technical
- Line length: 136.747 km (84.971 mi)
- Number of tracks: Double track
- Track gauge: 1,435 mm (4 ft 8 1/2 in) standard gauge
- Electrification: 15 kV/16.7 Hz AC overhead catenary
- Operating speed: 200 km/h (120 mph)

The Munich–Treuchtlingen railway, also known as the Altmühlbahn (Altmühl Railway), is a railway line in the German state of Bavaria. As part of the new and upgraded Nuremberg–Ingolstadt–Munich line project, the Munich-Ingolstadt section is gradually being upgraded for a line speed of up to 200 km/h (120 mph).

== History ==
The history of the Altmühl Railway starts in 1833, when the former politician and economist Friedrich List unveiled his plans for a Germany-wide railway network. Even then he envisaged a direct connection from Munich via Ingolstadt to Nuremberg.

During the next 25 years, these plans were considered by the council of the town of Eichstätt, in particular by Mayor Fehlner. They promised economic recovery mainly due to increased freight traffic, in particular from the quarries at Solnhofen and Eichstätt and the local steelworks. Therefore, Eichstätt, along with the other communities and businesses along the proposed route, established a committee to build the Altmühl railway, which made representations on several occasions to King Ludwig I.

Only when the town of Ansbach financed a railway from Ansbach to Gunzenhausen, where it connected to the Ludwig South-North Railway (German: Ludwig-Süd-Nord-Bahn) between Lindau and Nuremberg, did the committee succeed. The issue at this time was how to connect the line to Eichstätt—which was eventually linked by a branch line—and how to connect the line to Pleinfeld and Gunzenhausen. The Royal Chief Engineer (königlich functionierende Oberingenieur) Balbier examined several different lines, and finally decided to follow largely the valley of the Altmühl with separate routes from Treuchtlingen to Gunzenhausen and Pleinfeld. On 24 September 1863, the Bavarian parliament approved this plan and on 5 October 1863 King Maximilian II finally signed a law to build the line from Ingolstadt to Gunzenhausen and Pleinfeld.

=== Construction and commissioning ===
Construction began officially on 11 November 1867 and it was officially opened on 12 April 1870 by the Royal Bavarian State Railways (Königliche Bayerische Staats-Eisenbahnen). The line was initially built as a single track, with the formation built for double-track.

=== Duplication and electrification ===
With increasing traffic and as a result of the Röhrmoos railway accident on 6 July 1889, duplication of the line was carried out from 1889 to 1892. An act of 8 December 1889 granted the necessary funds for this. The second track was put into operation in sections on 3 August from Allach to Dachau, on 17 August to Röhrmoos, on 3 September to Petershausen, on 4 September to Pfaffenhofen, on 7 April 1892 to Wolnzach, on 23 June to Reichertshofen, on 18 July to Ingolstadt, on 9 July between Munich and Allach and the remaining section between Ingolstadt and Treuchtlingen on 4 August 1892.

After completion of electrification on the Nuremberg–Augsburg line in 1935, it was decided to also electrify the Altmühl Railway to Munich. Because of the Second World War, the only part completed was the Munich–Dachau section. However, due to the Second World War, Deutsche Reichsbahn only operated the Munich–Dachau section until 1 June 1944. After the war, Deutsche Bundesbahn considered that electrification of the Passau–Nuremberg–Frankfurt had higher priority, which meant that electrification of the Altmühl line was not completed until the early 1960s. Electrical services commenced with the start of the summer timetable on 27 May 1962.

=== New and upgraded Nuremberg–Ingolstadt–Munich line ===
In the 1990s, the line had two tracks throughout (three tracks from Munich to Munich-Allach) and was operable at speeds of up to 160 km/h. The 19th century route required speed restrictions of up to 110 km/h at numerous points with a minimum curve radius of 3000 Bavarian feet (876 metres, although the curve at Reichertshofen had a radius of 814 metres). In addition to long-distance passenger, regional and freight traffic, the Munich S-Bahn also used the Petershausen–Munich section of the line.

The southern Munich-Ingolstadt section of the line is being rebuilt as part of the Nuremberg-Ingolstadt-Munich new and upgraded line project (Neu- und Ausbaustrecke Nürnberg–Ingolstadt–München) and upgraded for higher speeds.

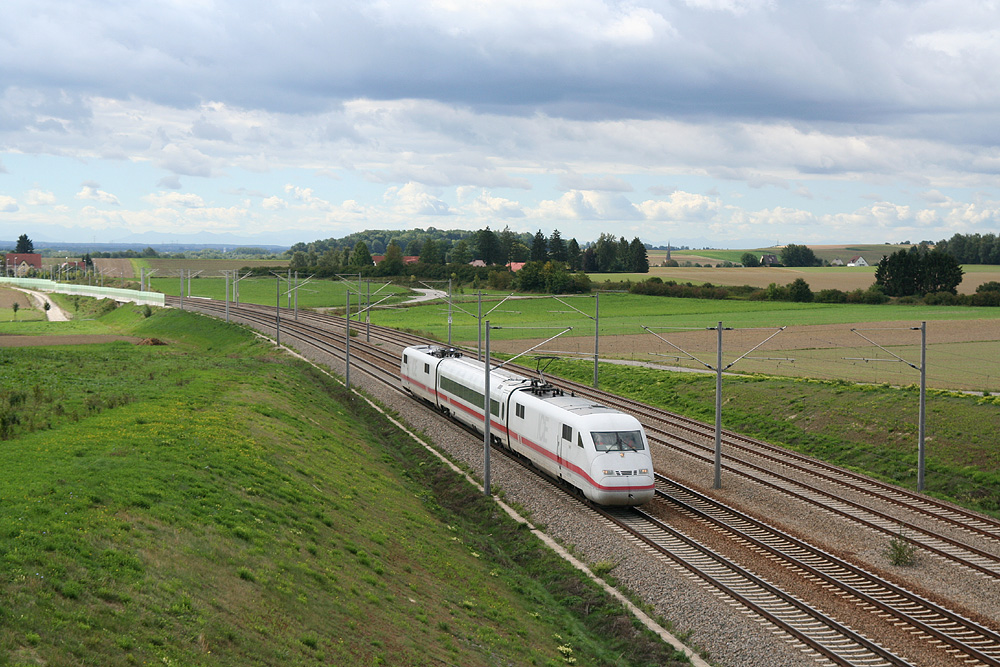
Upgraded line near Hebertshausen with ICE S on measurement run (September 2006)

According to the planning status report of 1994, line improvements with a total length of 37 kilometres were planned, mostly with reductions of length of well under 50 metres.

The route was divided into three sections.

==== Southern section (Munich–Petershausen) ====
Since 10 December 2006, trains have been able to operate at up to 200 km/h on the 29-kilometre section between Obermenzing and Petershausen. The rest of the route is mainly operated at 160 km/h, with the maximum speed reduced only between Munich Hauptbahnhof and Obermenzing (up to 120 km/h) and in Pfaffenhofen (150 km/h). This enables a travel time of 35 minutes between Munich and Ingolstadt.

Between Munich-Obermenzing and Dachau, the line could be upgraded for 200 km/h without line improvements. In the high-speed section, the curve radii were widened to at least 1,548 metres with a maximum cant of 160 millimetres and a cant deficiency of up to 150 millimetres. In many places, shifting the tracks by a few metres was sufficient. A new route was only necessary north of Hebertshausen. The route was shifted around 800 metres to the east over a length of around 4.5 kilometres. Since April 2003, the town of Unterweilbach has no longer been passed to the west, but to the east. In the high-speed section, more than 50 crossing structures were rebuilt or newly built. Extensive changes were also required at the stations along the route; among other things, 275 metre-long platforms were built. The upgrade was largely carried out during ongoing operations. A total of 14 level crossings were removed.

As part of the work, a separate parallel route was built for Munich S-Bahn traffic between Munich and Petershausen. The section between Dachau Nord and Petershausen was put into operation on 21 April 2003, and the entire route on 11 December 2005. Since the S-Bahn and long-distance trains have been separated, a 10-minute cycle can be run to Dachau during peak hour. The stations were also modernised, in particular made barrier-free, and the park-and-ride facilities were enlarged.

The bidding consortium around GP Günter Papenburg, the company which carried out the construction, was suspected of having undercut a competing company by using inside information about its offer. The contract to upgrade the line between Munich and the district of Dachau was awarded for €260 million in 2002. The Munich public prosecutor investigated the issue in 2002.

==== Middle section (Petershausen–Rohrbach) ====
The central section (Petershausen–Rohrbach, km 38.2 to 61.1) was to be upgraded for 190 km/h. This also applied to the area around the Reichertshofen curve, which, with a top speed of 120 km/h, was the slowest section of the route. The upgrade between Petershausen and Pfaffenhofen was completed in mid-July 2014.

Long-distance travel times were to be reduced by three minutes. Construction work began in mid-June 2011. Due to a lack of planning resources for the new ETCS train control system, the final upgrade was delayed indefinitely. Among other things, Pfaffenhofen station was renovated in 2020 and 2021. Residual work was expected to be completed in the second quarter of 2022. The planning and construction costs for the final upgrade was estimated to be €234 million at the beginning of 2018. The implementation of ETCS, which is necessary to realise the higher speeds, is to be completed by 2023.

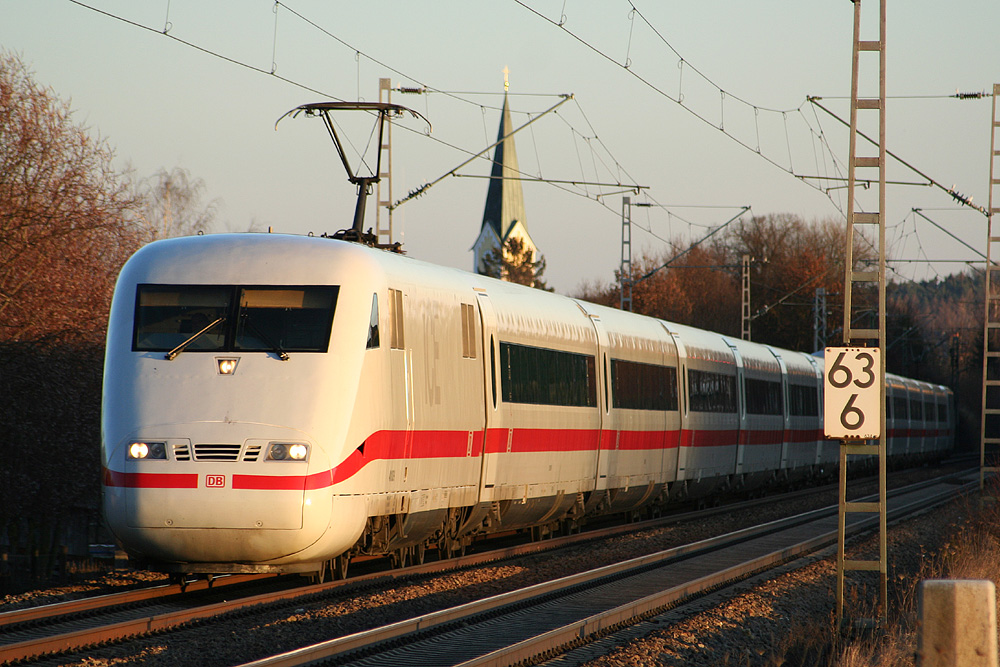
ICE 1 on the undeveloped section of the Munich–Ingolstadt route near Fahlenbach (2007)

The design speed of 190 km/h, which has been planned since at least 1999, results from economic considerations. An originally planned option for a complete upgrade to allow operations at 200 km/h no longer exists.

The central section was upgraded in individual sections while rail operations continued:

- Reichertshausen–Pfaffenhofen in 2012
- Pfaffenhofen–Uttenhofen in 2013
- Uttenhofen–Rohrbach in 2014

==== Section North (Rohrbach–Ingolstadt) ====
As part of the upgrade, the section from Rohrbach to Ingolstadt was upgraded for 160 km/h from spring 2000 to December 2006. From 1999 to 2001, another bridge was built over the Danube for the construction of a third track between Ingolstadt Hauptbahnhof and Ingolstadt Nord station. The symbolic start of construction for the expansion of the Ingolstadt–Petershausen section was celebrated on 18 June 2010. Line improvements of 7.95 kilometres were planned, along with 5.15 kilometres of new earthworks and the required widening of cross-sections. Completion of the overall project, which included 20 construction phases, was planned for 2014. A total of around €200 million of Deutsche Bahn's own funds would be invested in both sections. Without the upgrade, Deutsche Bahn would have to pay back EU funds for the entire project. In the course of this work, Reichertshofen station was rebuilt about 500 m north of the previous location as Baar-Ebenhausen station. The new station went into operation in July 2011 along with a new section of line. In contrast to the old Reichertshofen station, all the main tracks in the new station are continuous. The number of sidings at the existing station is to remain unchanged.

The northern section was upgraded in separate sections while trains operated:

- construction of the new Baar-Ebenhausen station in 2010–2011
- line improvement in Reichertshofen in 2011–2014
- Petershausen–Reichertshofen in 2013

==== German clock-face timetable ====
In the third expert draft of the proposed German-wide clock face timetable (Deutschlandtakt), a four-track upgrade between Ingolstadt and Petershausen is assumed. Work costing an estimated €973 million at 2015 prices were planned for this. A third track between Munich Hauptbahnhof and Dachau is to be built for €454 million, and two overtaking tracks for freight traffic in Petershausen for a further €42 million.

In July 2022, Deutsche Bahn suggestions of a new high-speed line between Munich and Ingolstadt with a journey time of 25 minutes and a branch from this to a new station at Munich Airport became known. The costs for this project were estimated at around €5 billion and the economic benefit at €7.1 billion.

== Route ==
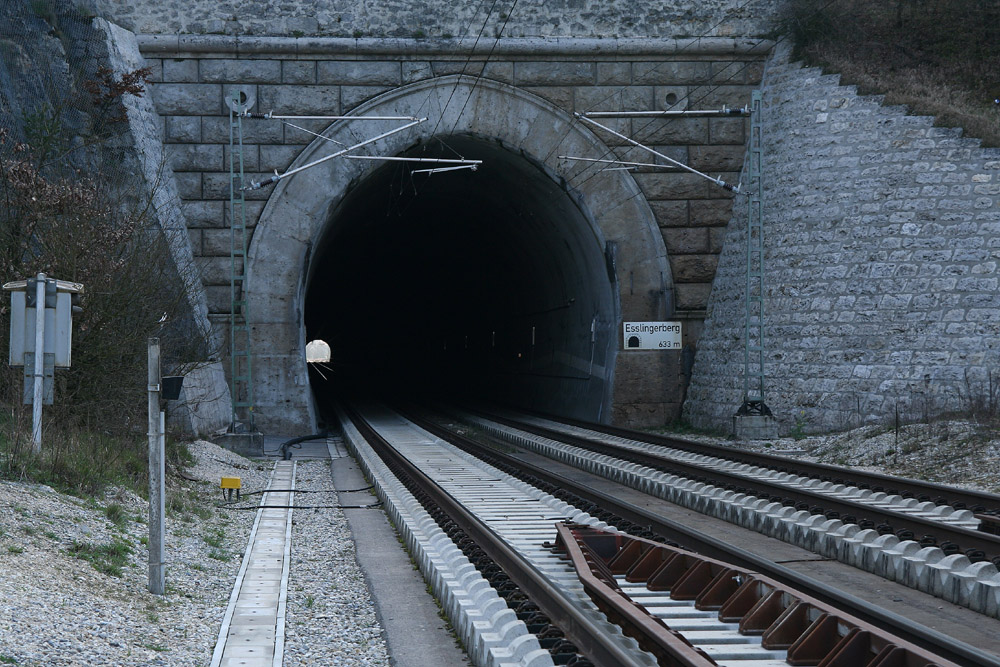
Esslingerberg Tunnel with slab track

The line leaves Munich Hauptbahnhof in a westerly direction and then swings to the north. Connecting curves connect the Munich North marshalling yard to the line near Allach. In the following high-speed section, the line runs in wide curves from the entry into the Danube-Isar hill country near Dachau, running due north. After Petershausen, the line swings into the Ilm valley and follows it with some sharper bends to Rohrbach. The line cuts through the ridge between Rohrbach and Reichertshofen to the Paar valley and the line then continues to the north-west to Ingolstadt in the Danube lowlands.

From Ingolstadt the line runs mostly north-westerly towards Eichstätt Bahnhof, which is located on the edge of the Eichstätt district of Wasserzell. A 5.1 km long remnant of the non-electrified Eichstätt–Beilngries line connects as a branch line from Eichstätt Stadt (town) station to the main line. From Eichstätt Bahnhof the line runs largely in the narrow Altmühl valley and as a result it is very curvy. Between Eichstätt Bahnhof and Dollnstein there are two bends that make almost 180° turns. In order to avoid unnecessary bridges over the Altmühl the river was diverted or cuttings were blown through the rocks. Two tunnels, Kirchberg tunnel near Zimmern and Esslingerberg tunnel near Esslingen, and a cutting through a spur of the Perlachberge range near Treuchtlingen cut through loops of the Altmühl. Just before Treuchtlingen station the line also crosses a plate girder bridge over the Möhrenbach, which is similar in design and size to the many bridges over the Altmühl.

=== Stations ===
Treuchtlingen station is at the junction of the Treuchtlingen–Würzburg, the Treuchtlingen–Ingolstadt–Munich and the Nuremberg–Augsburg lines. It was established in 1869 in its current form. In addition, it formerly had a depot with 20 tracks, which are now partly dismantled.

Pappenheim station has existed since the opening of the line in 1870.

Solnhofen station was established with the opening of the line in 1870. It has two main platform tracks and through track for non-stopping traffic.

=== Infrastructure ===
The course is designed to permit speeds of 110–200 km/h. The superstructure is built with a conventional ballasted track with both wooden and concrete sleepers. An exception is in the Esslingerberg tunnel, which was completely refurbished up until early 2006 for €19 million including the installation of slab track.

== Rail services ==
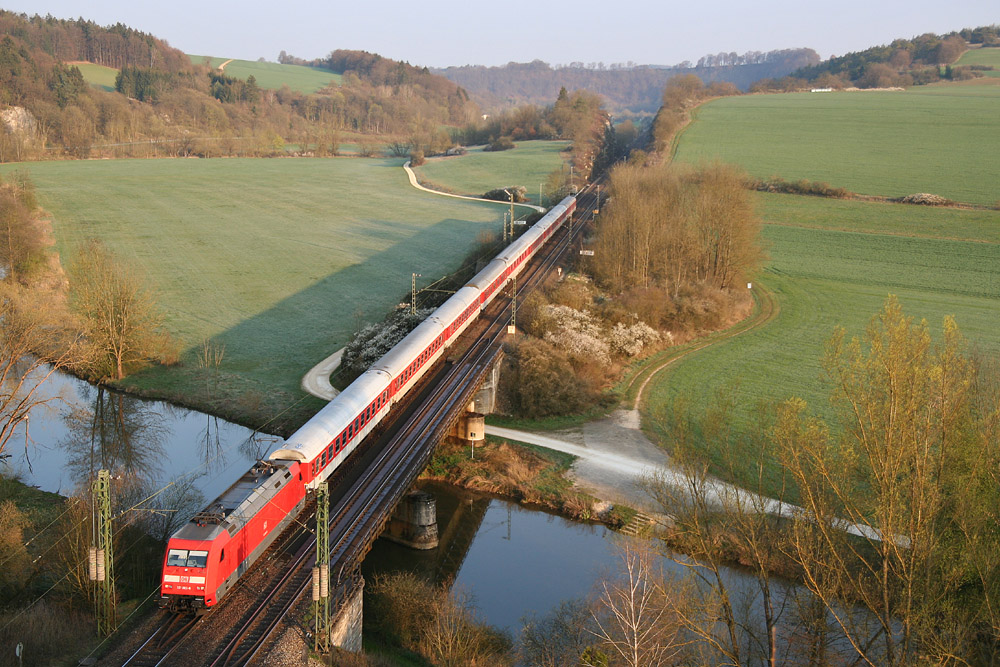
EuroNight 483 Copenhagen–Munich crossing the Altmühl near Dollnstein

The line has an hourly Regionalbahn service on the Munich–Ingolstadt–Treuchtlingen route, which is extended to Nuremberg at two-hourly intervals. Until 2013, the trains continuing to Nuremberg operated as Regional-Expresses. The München-Nürnberg-Express and long-distance trains also operate on the Munich-Ingolstadt section, not stopping between Munich and Ingolstadt and some services not stopping at Ingolstadt. Extra Regionalbahn services of the Bayerische Regiobahn (BRB) operate during peak hours between Ingolstadt and Eichstätt. The northern section of the line was formerly of great importance for long-distance traffic, but since 27 May 2006 all long distance services have run on the Nuremberg–Ingolstadt high-speed railway. Prior to its discontinuance in December 2010, the line was served by a pair of Eurocity services (EN 482/483) on the Munich–Copenhagen route via Ingolstadt and Treuchtlingen, because the trains did not have the required approvals to operate over the high-speed line. Currently the only long-distance services running over the northern section are motorail trains and seasonal services.

The line is of great importance for freight transport. It is an important link for north-south traffic for trains running from and to Ingolstadt and for traffic coming from Würzburg or Nuremberg and continuing to Munich.
