= Allersberg-Express =

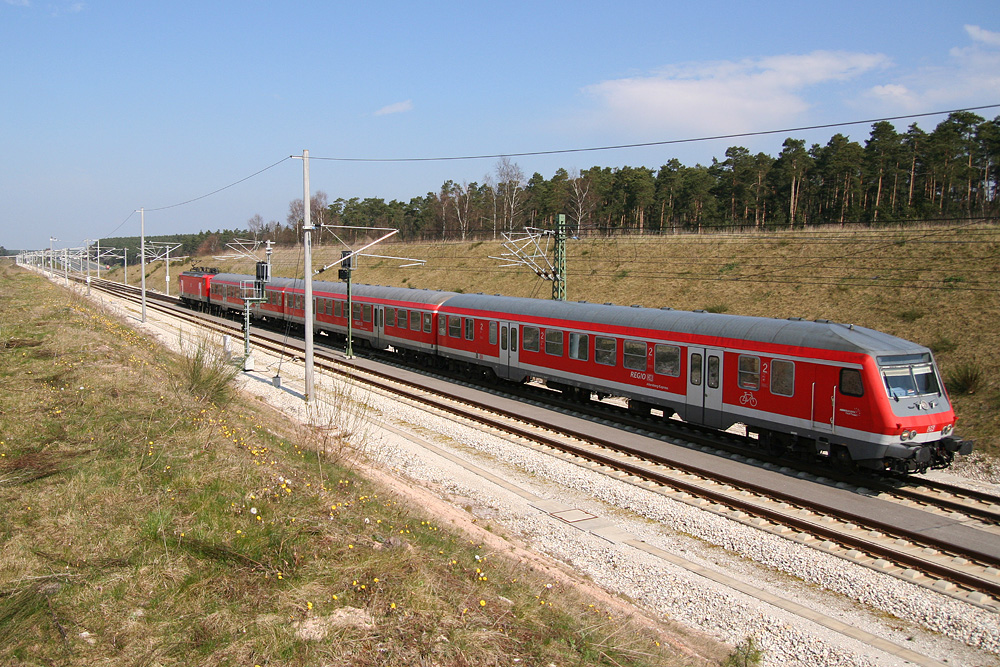
An Allersberg-Express consist approaching Allersberg station

Allersberg-Express was the brand name for the RegionalBahn train service between Nuremberg and Allersberg in Bavaria in southern Germany, operated by Deutsche Bahn. It started operations on 10 December 2006 and is one of the few regional trains to run on a German high-speed line. The total journey time was about fifteen minutes; the train was subject to the fare structure of the Verkehrsverbund Großraum Nürnberg. The Allersberg-Express was also called the R9 Express on VGN network web site. With the December 2020 schedule change, the Allersberg Express was retitled S5 of the Nuremberg S-Bahn. It is now served with Alstom Coradia Continental trainsets.

== Service operation ==
The train operates as a shuttle service without any stops between the Nürnberg Hbf and Allersberg (Rothsee) stations. It utilises the Nuremberg–Ingolstadt high-speed railway, where it can reach a maximum speed of 140 km/h (87 mph). The 25 km (16 mi) journey takes about 15 minutes in the 2012 schedule. Connections to seven regional bus lines are available at Allersberg station, as well as a park and ride facility with 286 parking bays and 112 bicycle racks.

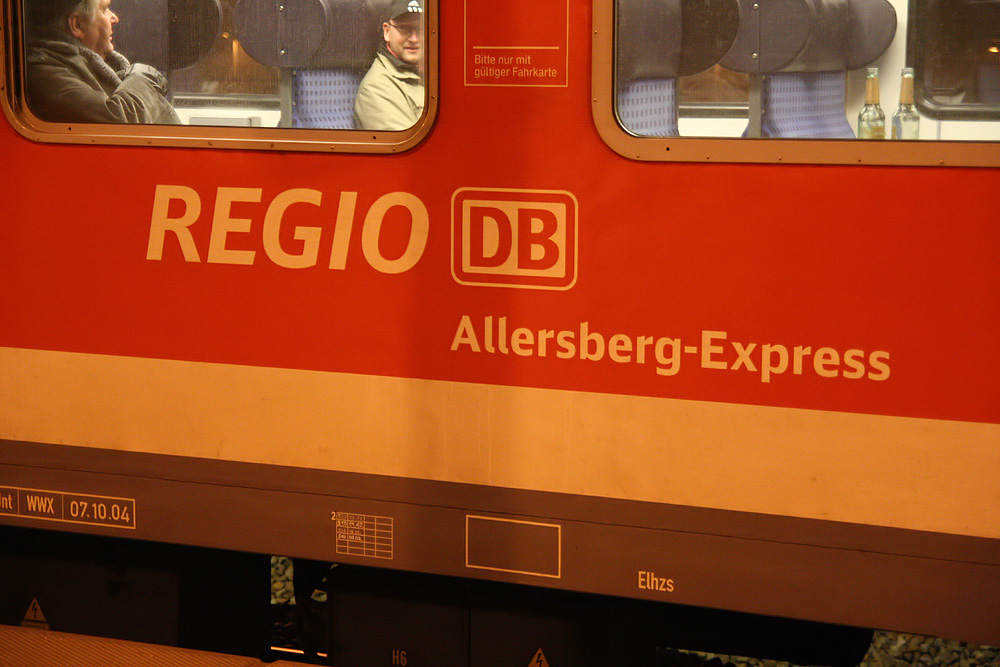
Brand name on the rolling stock

== Rolling stock ==
The train is usually operated with a Class 112 locomotive and three modernised n coaches (two Bndrz 451.9 coaches and a Bnrbdzf 480.3 control car). When the service was first established, a "sandwiched" train consist (112+Bn+Bn+Bnf+112) was used as the control car for the service did not have the necessary LZB equipment installed yet. Contrary to the usual coaches of this type, the Allersberg-Express coaches are equipped with an electronic passenger information system and pushbutton-operated exterior doors. The train offers 240 2nd class seats and 34 bicycle racks.

== Technical Information ==
- On the open line, the train set runs with the LZB in-cab signalling, where available. Due to technical restrictions, however, the train cannot depart on LZB after reversing in Allersberg, as the earliest possible entry point to the LZB signalling is located on the open line north of the station, at km 23. For that reason, the train has to wait at Allersberg until the next conventional signal, which is located about 15 km down the line on the Reichswald branch, has cleared. If the Allersberg-Express allows an ICE to pass, it therefore takes a minimum wait of four minutes before the train can depart.
- The Allersberg-Express, with its top speed of 140 km/h (87 mph), is the only non-pressurised regional train which regularly passes ICE 3 trains running at their top speed of 300 km/h (186 mph). The service also is one of the few regional trains to perform a scheduled run on a German high-speed line, the other notable train being the München-Nürnberg-Express.
