= Burgthann–Allersberg railway =

Former railway line in Germany

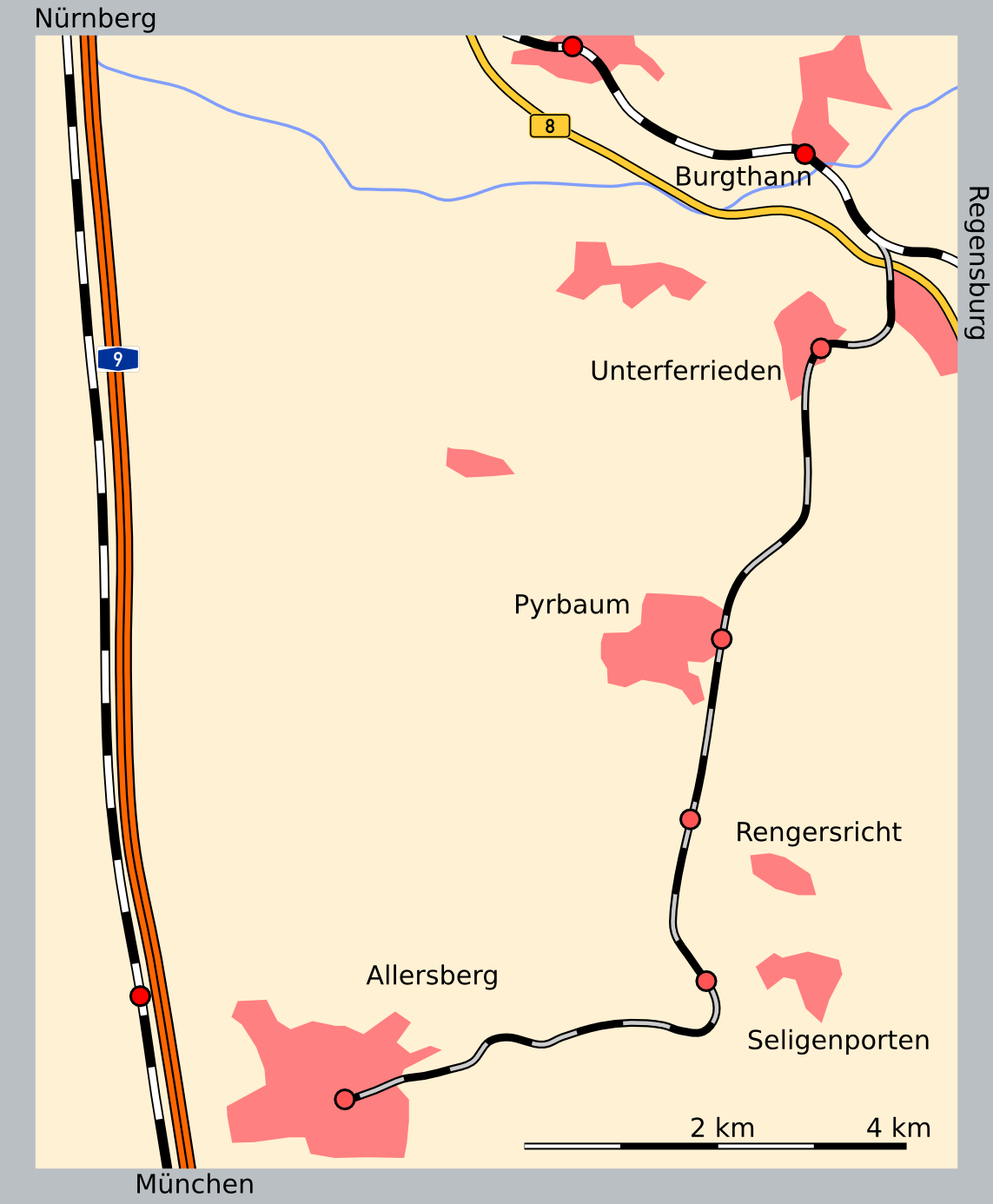

Overview
- Line number: 5932

Service
- Route number: 897

Technical
- Line length: 14.8 km (9.2 mi)
- Track gauge: 1,435 mm (4 ft 8 1/2 in)

The Burgthann–Allersberg railway was a ca. 15 kilometre long Lokalbahn or branch line in Bavaria, southern Germany, that began at Burgthann on the Nuremberg–Regensburg main line.

== History ==
=== Planning and Construction ===
Plans to link Allersberg to the railway network at the end of the 19th century variously envisaged routes from Nuremberg, Ochenbruck or Roth, but in the end the Royal Bavarian State Railways built a branch from the Nuremberg–Regensburg railway at Burgthann. The route was finally opened on 15 December 1902.

=== Closure ===
The Deutsche Bundesbahn decided to close the route as early as the 1970s. The dilapidated state of the bridge over the B 8 accelerated this process, so that on 2 June 1973 the last train on the Allersberger Bockl left the station of Allersberg.

== The trackbed today ==
After the line was dismantled, large sections of the trackbed were converted into a footpath and cycle way. The former station buildings at Pyrbaum and Allersberg are now homes. At another location, 33 years later, on 6 December 2006, the new Allersberg (Rothsee) station on the Nuremberg–Ingolstadt high-speed railway was opened.

== See also ==
- Bavarian branch lines
- Royal Bavarian State Railways
- List of closed railway lines in Bavaria
