= Audi Tunnel =

Railway tunnel in Bavaria, Germany

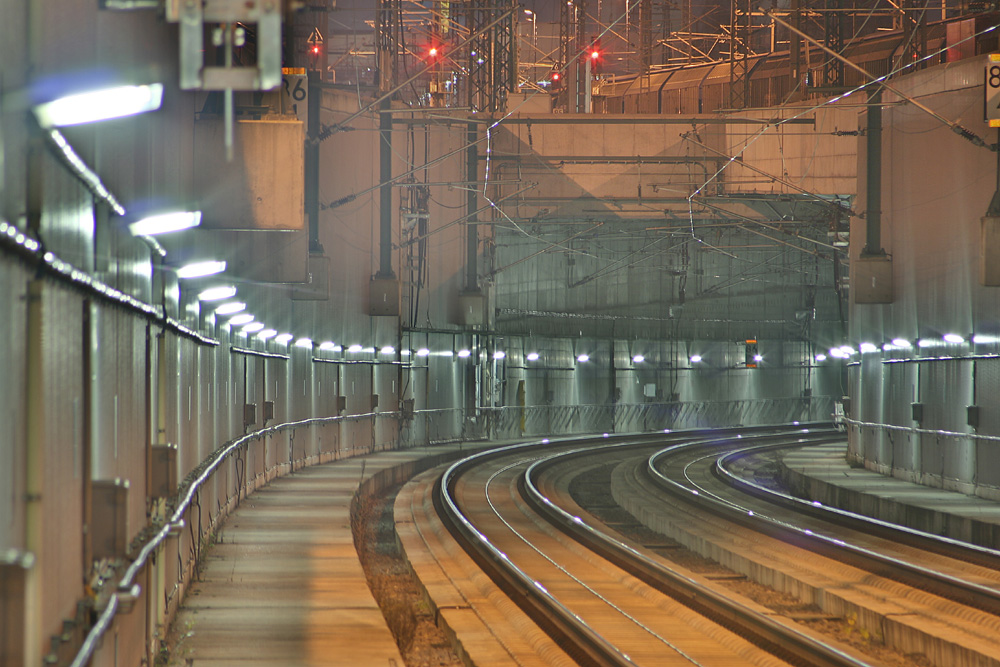
View from track 4 on Ingolstadt Nord station of the southern portal of the Audi Tunnel

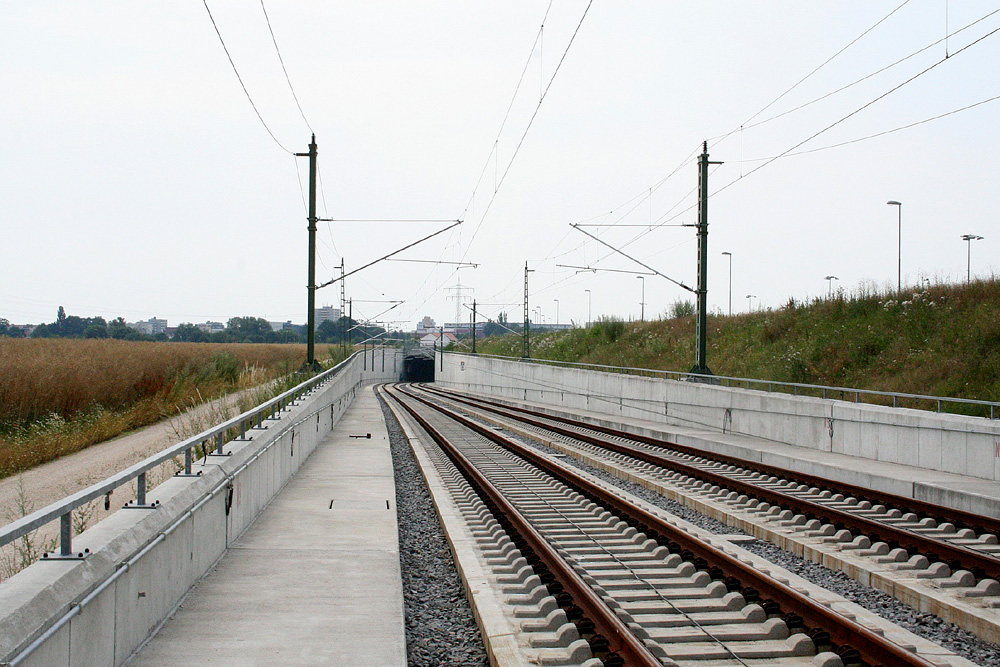
Northern ramp and portal of the Audi Tunnel

The Audi Tunnel is a twin-tracked railway tunnel on the Nuremberg–Ingolstadt high-speed railway just north of Ingolstadt in Bavaria, Germany. It lies just outside Ingolstadt Nord station and passes under part of the Audi car factory site (hence the name) as well as other industrial and residential areas. With a length of 1258 metres (from kilometre post 84.995 to 86.253) it is the second shortest of the new tunnels on this newly built line. The tunnel was originally planned to be 1138 metres long, but was extended north by 120 metres.

The northern portal is at 48°47′17″N 11°25′39″E, the southern portal at 48°46′37″N 11°25′44″E.
