= Allersberg (Rothsee) station =

Railway station in Germany

Coordinates: 49°15′13″N 11°12′52″E

Allersberg (Rothsee)
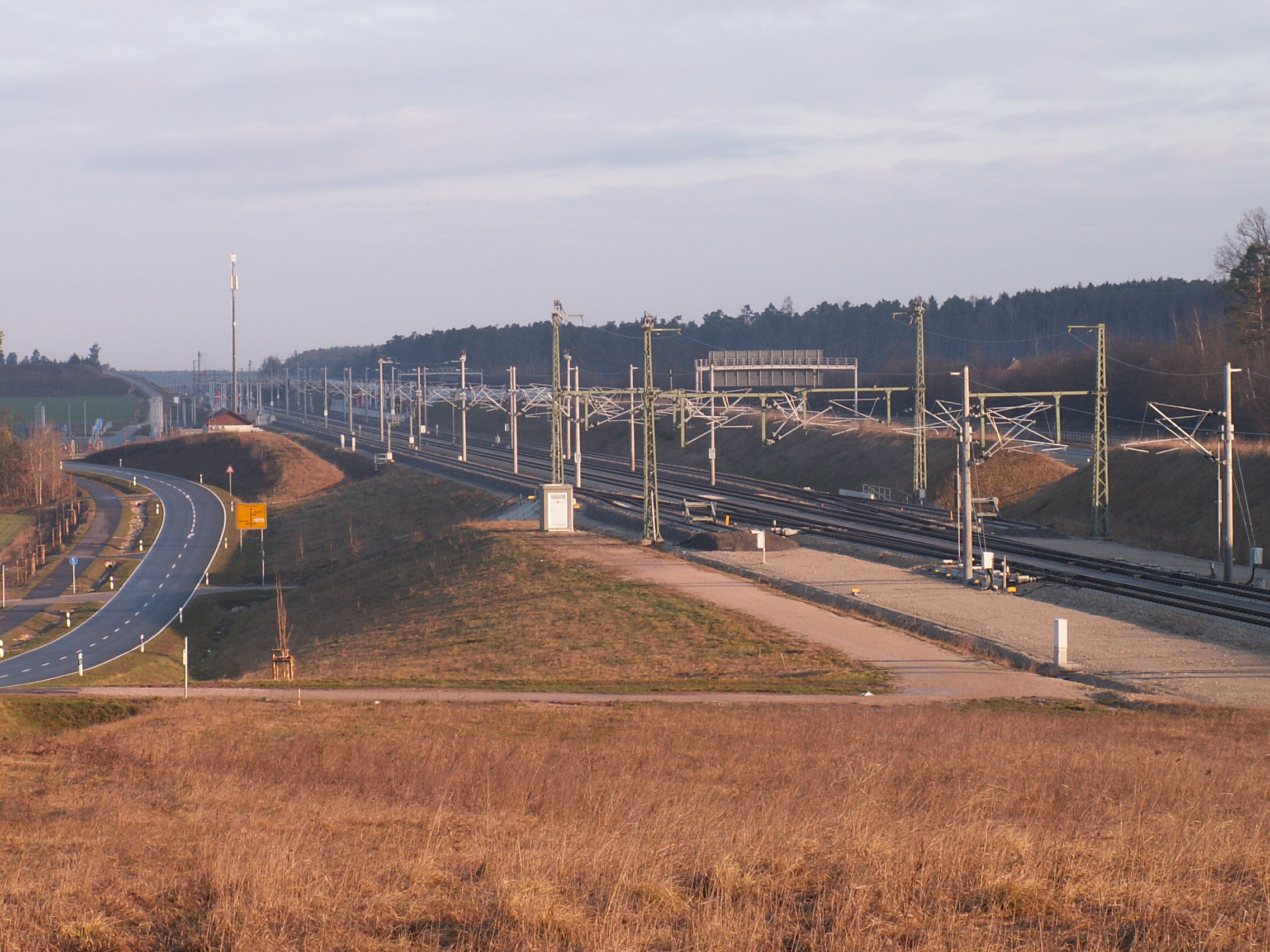

General information
- Location: Altenfeldener Str 1, Allersberg, Bavaria; Germany
- Owner: Deutsche Bahn
- Operator: DB InfraGO
- Line: Nuremberg-Ingolstadt high-speed line

Other information
- Station code: 99
- DS100 code: NALB
- IBNR: 8000498
- Category: 6
- Fare zone: VGN: 636
- Website: www.bahnhof.de

History
- Opened: 6 December 2006

Services
Preceding station	DB Regio Bayern	Following station
Nürnberg Hbf Terminus	RE 1	Kinding (Altmühltal) towards München Hbf
Preceding station	Nuremberg S-Bahn	Following station
Nürnberg Hbf Terminus	S5	Terminus
Location
- Location within Bavaria Location within Germany Location within Europe

Allersberg (Rothsee) is a railway station situated at km 25.4 of the Nuremberg–Ingolstadt high-speed railway.

The station is situated about 3 km west of the Middle Franconian town Allersberg, adjacent to the A 9 motorway. Together with Kinding (Altmühltal) (km 58.6) and Ingolstadt Nord (km 86.8) it is one of three regional stations on the high-speed line. It was opened on December 6, 2006, connecting Allersberg to the rail network again 33 years after the closure of the Burgthann–Allersberg railway. The station is administrated by the station management at Nuremberg station.

== Operational usage ==
Trains call at the station since December 10, 2006. Prior to that date, the railway line was exclusively used by ICE trains that did not call at Allersberg.

Allersberg is a stop for the RegionalExpress trains of the München-Nürnberg-Express service. This service stops at Allersberg every two hours, with additional trains in hourly intervals during peak times. Additionally, a RegionalBahn service, the Allersberg-Express, connects Allersberg to Nürnberg Hbf. This service stops at Allersberg once per hour, with fewer trains in off-peak times and on weekends. The München-Nürnberg-Express reaches a maximum speed of 200 km/h (120 mph), the Allersberg-Express travels at 140 km/h (87 mph). Travel time to Nuremberg is about 15 minutes, the journey to Munich takes circa 90 minutes.

== Infrastructure ==
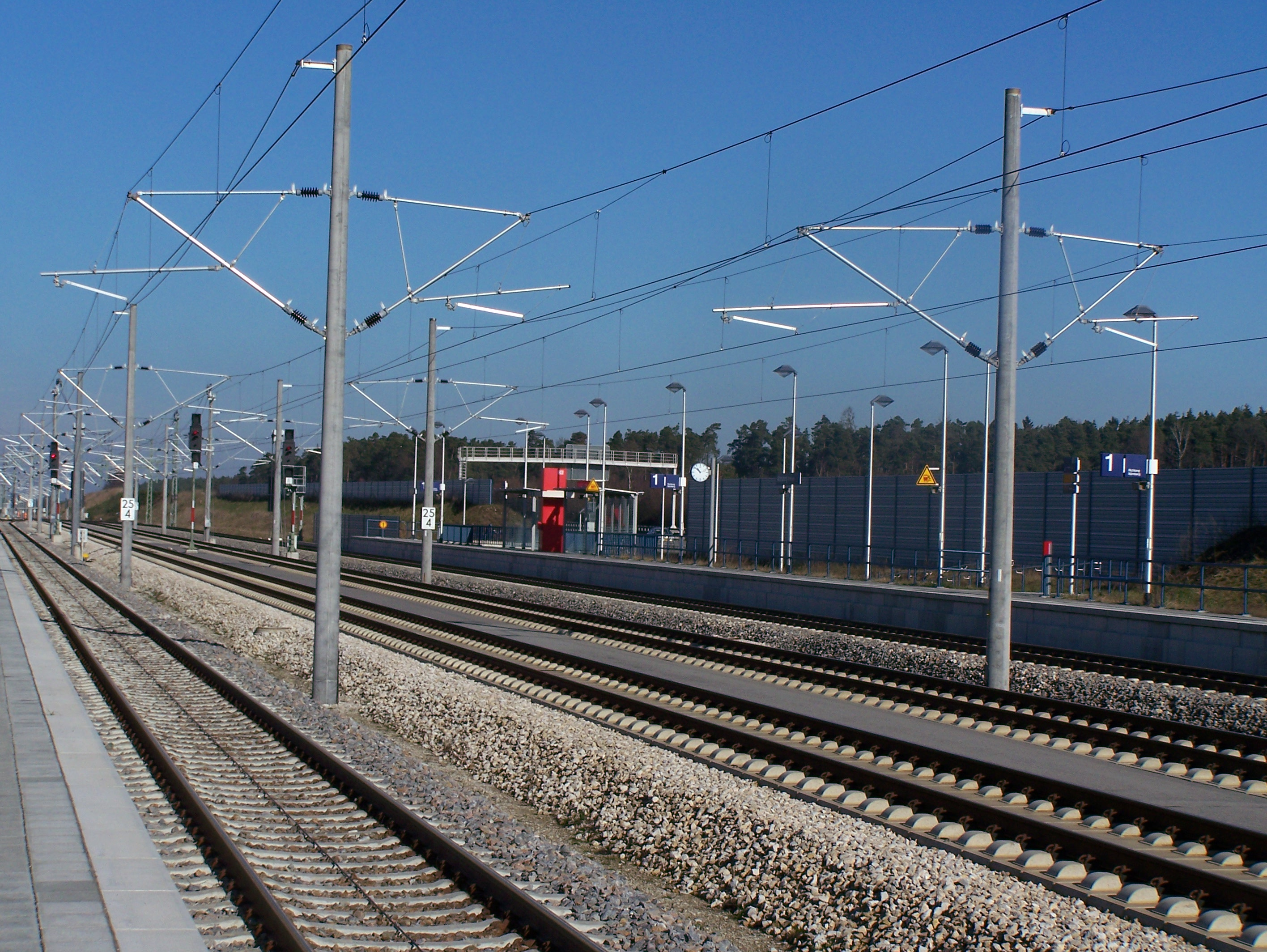
Nuremberg-bound platform, 2007.

The station is built on a dam and equipped with two through tracks in the centre. The maximum speed on these tracks is 300 km/h (190 mph) , they are built utilising UIC 60 rails on concrete slab trackbeds. The two outer tracks are built using conventional S54 rails on gravel and are equipped with a platform each. The platforms are 170 m (560 ft) long. North of the station, a set of four points is installed.

Southbound München-Nürnberg-Express trains (to Ingolstadt and Munich) depart from platform 4, northbound trains on that line (to Nuremberg) depart from platform 1. The Allersberg-Express trains always depart from platform 1.

Both platforms are equipped with passenger shelters, a short-distance ticket machine and several ticket cancellation machines. There is no staff present on the station. The only permanent structures apart from the passenger shelters are a substation of the electronic signal box and a GSM-R transmitter.

A road tunnel and a passenger subway cross underneath the tracks. Both platforms are accessible with two stairwells and a ramp each.

Allersberg (Rothsee) is one of the four stations in Germany that can be passed through at a speed of 300 km/h (190 mph). The other stations are Kinding (Altmühltal) (south on the line) and Limburg Süd and Montabaur on the Cologne-Frankfurt line.

== Local transport ==
The station is situated adjacent to the A9 autobahn junction Allersberg. There are six bus stands and 112 bicycle ranks at the station. Furthermore, there are 286 parking bays with an electronic guidance system and a cycle path connecting the station to the Rothsee recreation area.

Seven bus lines connect the station to local towns and villages. Apart from the connection to Allersberg, bus lines operate to Thalmässing, Greding, Heideck, Pyrbaum and Freystadt. Two lines connect the station to the two main towns in the area, Neumarkt in der Oberpfalz and Roth. One bus line also connects to Hilpoltstein, with yet unknown consequences for the Roth-Hilpoltstein railway.
