= Ingolstadt Hauptbahnhof =

Railway station in Bavaria, Germany

Ingolstadt Hbf
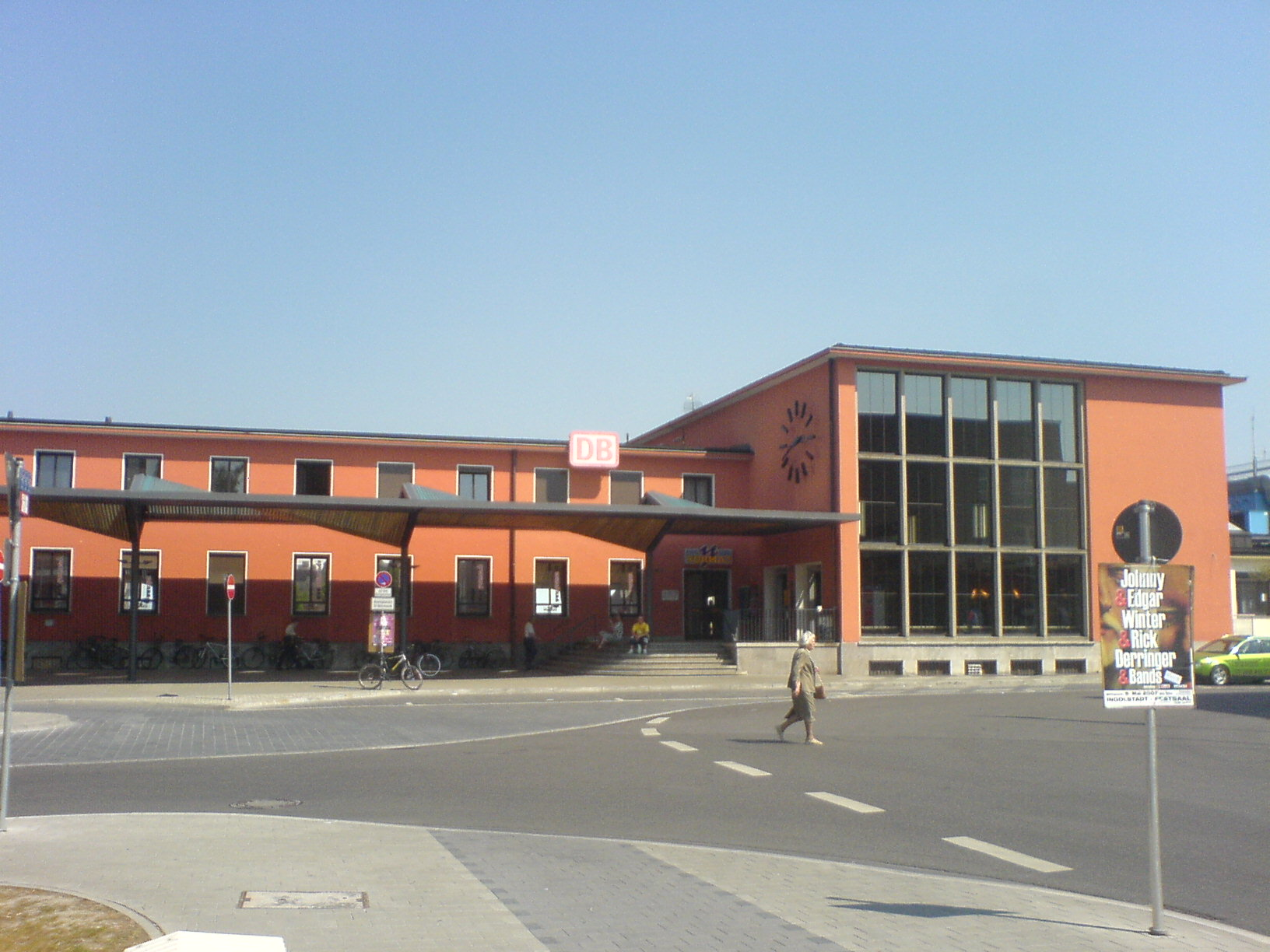
- Front of the station building

General information
- Location: Ingolstadt, Bavaria; Germany
- Coordinates: 48°44′40″N 11°26′13″E
- Owner: Deutsche Bahn
- Operator: DB InfraGO
- Lines: Ingolstadt–Augsburg railway (KBS 983); Nuremberg–Ingolstadt high-speed railway (KBS 900/901/990); Munich–Treuchtlingen railway (KBS 990); Ingolstadt–Eichstätt Stadt railway (KBS 991); Ingolstadt–Neuoffingen railway (KBS 993); Ingolstadt–Riedenburg railway (closed)
- Platforms: 7

Construction
- Accessible: Yes

Other information
- Station code: 2993
- DS100 code: MIH
- IBNR: 8000183
- Category: 2
- Fare zone: VGI: 100
- Website: www.bahnhof.de; stationsdatenbank.de

History
- Opened: 1 June 1874
Services
Preceding station	DB Fernverkehr	Following station
Nürnberg Hbf towards Hamburg-Altona	ICE 18	München Hbf Terminus
Nürnberg Hbf towards Hamburg-Altona	ICE 25	München Hbf Terminus
Nürnberg Hbf towards Hamburg-Altona	ICE 28	München Hbf Terminus
Nürnberg Hbf towards Dortmund Hbf	ICE 41	München Hbf Terminus
Preceding station	DB Regio Bayern	Following station
Ingolstadt Nord towards Nürnberg Hbf	RE 1	Rohrbach (Ilm) towards München Hbf
Ingolstadt Nord towards Nürnberg Hbf	RB 16	Baar-Ebenhausen towards München Hbf
Preceding station		Following station
Terminus	RE 18	Ernsgaden towards Regensburg Hbf
Weichering towards Ulm Hbf	RB 15	Terminus
Ingolstadt Nord Terminus	RB 17	Ernsgaden towards Plattling
Preceding station		Following station
Brunnen towards Augsburg Hbf	RB 13	Terminus
Terminus	RB 14	Ingolstadt Nord towards Eichstätt Stadt
Location

Ingolstadt Hauptbahnhof is a railway station in the Bavarian city of Ingolstadt, situated in southern Germany. Ingolstadt station is an important junction in the Deutsche Bahn network. It has 7 platform tracks and is classified by Deutsche Bahn as a category 2 station.

== History ==
The increasing economic and population growth of Ingolstadt in the second half of the 19th century increased the need for the rapid transport of goods and people. Steamboats on the Danube proved difficult because of the low water level and currents.

On 4 February 1862, the council of the city of Ingolstadt was presented for the first time with a proposal to construct a rail link from Ingolstadt via Solnhofen to Pleinfeld and later via Eichstätt to Nuremberg. Although the line from Munich to Ingolstadt was approved by the Kingdom of Bavaria in October 1863, construction was slow at first. Therefore, the Ingolstadt council sent a deputation to the king in 1865 "for the promotion of the construction of the Munich–Ingolstadt railway".

The Munich–Ingolstadt railway, the first line to Ingolstadt, was opened on 14 November 1867. Discussions about the location of a future station had begun in 1860 as the city was a state fortress and played an important military role. A commission comprising representatives of the military and the board of the State Railway decided to build a local station near the fortress (the present Ingolstadt Nord station) and the main station at Oberstimm, far to the south of the city and the present location. A temporary local station was established called Ingolstadt Provisorium ("provisional Ingolstadt") about 300 m to the north of the present station. It had an entrance building consisting only of a wooden crate.

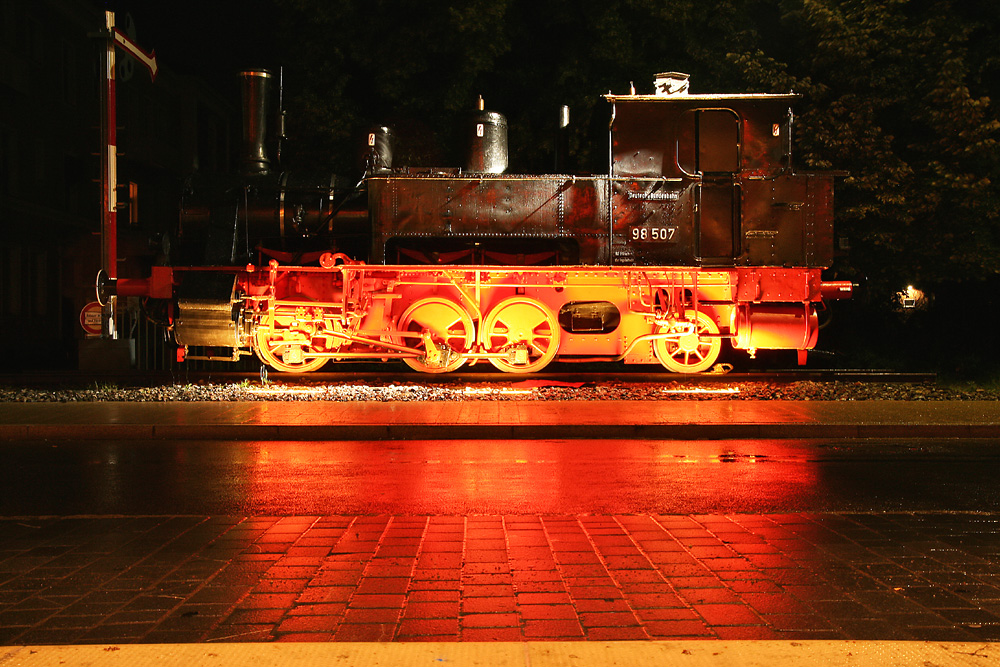
Plinthed locomotive 98 507 in front of the station

In 1872, after the extension of the line to Treuchtlingen and the construction of the Ingolstadt–Neuoffingen railway to Donauwörth, construction started on the Hauptbahnhof at its current location to a design by the architect Jakob Graff. This was opened on 1 June 1874, along with the continuation of the Regensburg–Ingolstadt railway to Regensburg.

Next to the platform tracks, five through tracks were provided for marshalling and loading. A 400-metre long loading ramp at the south end of the station was also established for military trains. At each end of the station, broad level crossings were built in order to allow large contingents of troops to cross the tracks.

The initial network of lines from Ingolstadt station was completed with the opening of the Ingolstadt–Augsburg railway from Augsburg in 1874. However, there are also lines that have not been completed to the present day despite plans at that time. These include the Ingolstadt–Beilngries–Berching–Altdorf–Hersbruck line, which was planned in the early 1870s and a line to Landshut.

Land was even acquired for the Ingolstadt–Geisenfeld branch line, but rather than a large rail network in the Hallertau, work only started, on 1 August 1893, on the construction of the short Wolnzach–Gosseltshausen–Wolnzach/Markt–Gebrontshausen–Berg–Au (now Enzelhausen)–Mainburg line, connecting "the heart of Holledau" to the rail network. The result was a line known as the Holledauer Bockerl (Holledau is an alternative form of Hallertau and Bockerl is a Bavarian term for a steam-hauled branch line). The idea of a direct rail connection between the refinery and industrial centre of Ingolstadt and the chemical triangle around Burghausen in eastern Bavaria was raised again on 28 October 1985 at the Bundestag Committee on Transport. However, this largely took the view that the existing rail capacity on the routes between Ingolstadt and Burghausen via Landshut or Munich was sufficient.

As a railway junction, especially in a city with a traditionally great military importance, Ingolstadt station was a strategic target for Allied air raids during the Second World War. In particular, the attack of 23 April 1945 heavily damaged the station and the entrance building.

The current station building is the second. After the Second World War, it took ten years to rebuild the station. On 25 November 1957, a new entrance building was put into operation and the platforms were covered two years later. From 1990 to 1995, the western Danube Valley Railway linking Ingolstadt Hauptbahnhof and Weichering were completely realigned. The Danube Valley Railway, which previously left the station to the north and passed along a loop through the city, now branches off to the south of the station to reach Weichering.

=== From Intercity station to ICE station ===
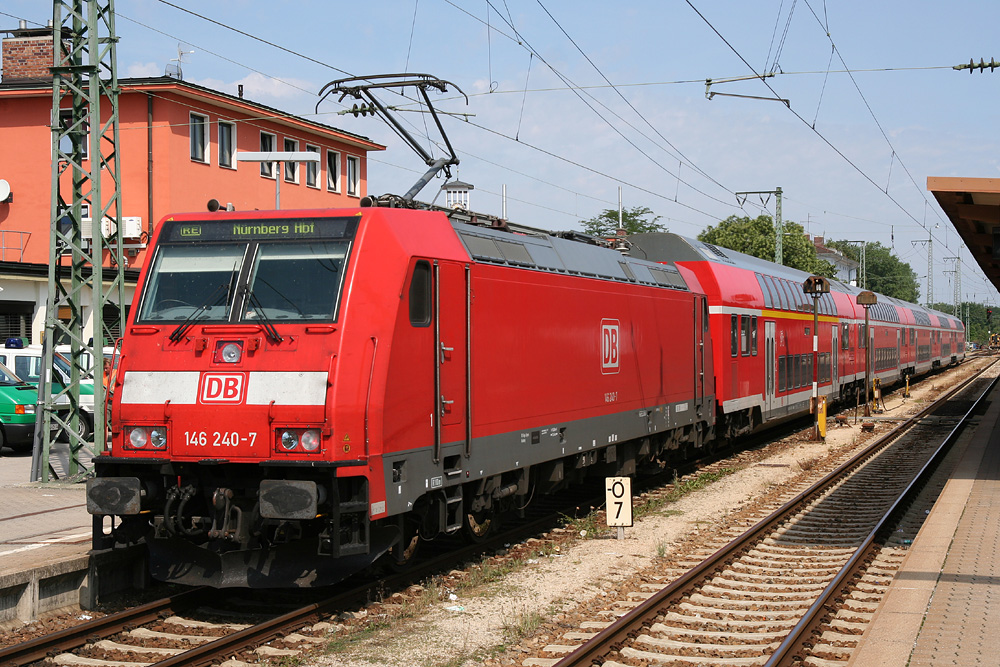
Class 146 locomotive with the RE service to Nuremberg in Ingolstadt Hbf

With its establishment of the Intercity network on 26 September 1971, Ingolstadt Hauptbahnhof became part of the IC network. Nevertheless, long-distance services in the winter timetable 1971/72 were still quite limited in Ingolstadt, since initially, only one Intercity train pair operated to Ingolstadt, the IC 123 (Nymphenburg) and the IC 126 (Herrenhausen). In the following years, however, IC services at Ingolstadt station increased. So in the winter 1991/92 timetable, there were services between Ingolstadt and Munich and between Ingolstadt and Frankfurt and the Ruhr every two hours.

In the early 1990s, Ingolstadt Hbf was also an InterRegio (IR) stop, as the then Deutsche Bundesbahn gradually replaced the aging long-distance express trains (D-Züge) with this new train type. With the beginning of the summer 1995 timetable (from 28 May 1995), Intercity-Express trains (on the Dortmund–Munich route) stopped at Ingolstadt for the first time in regular service. The first service to stop in Ingolstadt was ICE 821 (Main-Kurier) on its way from Frankfurt to Munich on 29 May 1995. The trip from Ingolstadt to Munich then cost 32 Deutsche marks.

On 15 December 2002, IR line 21 (Würzburg–Ansbach–Ingolstadt–Munich) was discontinued and replaced by IC line 66 (Frankfurt–Munich). At the small timetable change on 12 June 2005, five ICE train pairs from Ingolstadt to Munich was extended to Nuremberg and the Ruhr. At the same time, the Nuremberg–Munich IC line was abolished.

The director general of the Royal Bavarian transport institute Ludwig Joseph von Brück had called for a direct rail connection between Munich and Nuremberg via Ingolstadt as early as 1863; this idea was taken up again by Deutsche Bundesbahn in the early 1980s. The model of the Cologne–Frankfurt high-speed railway was applied to the new Bavarian high speed line, ultimately leading to the modern concept of a line along the A9 Autobahn.

On 15 July 1994, a large ground-breaking ceremony was held in the Nuremberg district of Fischbach for the beginning of construction of the 89 km long new line between Nuremberg and Ingolstadt, which was designed for speeds of up to 300 km/h. The Ingolstadt–Munich line south of Petershausen station was upgraded for a top speed of 200 km/hour from 2002 to 2006.

In the course of this construction, the node at Ingolstadt was remodelled with the redesign of the North Ingolstadt station and the upgrade of the existing two track railway between the North and Hauptbahnhof stations with a third track. Work began in May 2010, on the final section of the upgrade of the line, called Endausbau Nord (“upgrade north”), between Ingolstadt and Peterhausen, which is to be completed in 2014.

When the Nuremberg–Ingolstadt high-speed railway was fully integrated into the ICE network on 10 December 2006, Ingolstadt received hourly direct services to Berlin and to Hamburg. Since then Ingolstadt Hbf has been served with almost hourly ICE trains. Intercity trains between Munich and Nuremberg now run regularly only via Augsburg.

Travel time over the years (scheduled time of the fastest available connection)
Relation	Winter timetable 1971/72 (26 Sept. 1971–27. May 1972)	2005 timetable (12 Dec. 2004–10 Dec. 2005)	2009 timetable (13 Dec. 2009–10 Dec. 2010)
Ingolstadt–Munich	35 minutes (IC 126)	47 minutes (IC 2512)	36 minutes (ICE 729)
Nuremberg–Ingolstadt	58 minutes (IC 126)	1 h 4 minutes (IC 2464)	26 minutes (ICE 827)

=== Accident of 2 March 1972 ===
On 2 March 1972, a through freight train (Dg 6563) ran through Ingolstadt Hbf at about 60 km/h and collided with a loaded tanker train (Üg 18263). This stood at the entrance of the station and had no rear lighting. Due to an axle counter fault on the signaling block, the dispatcher had to manually intervene and mistakenly directed the through freight train on to the track occupied by Üg 18263. As a result of the collision, the 20 wagons of the tanker train exploded in fire. The drivers of the colliding train and two residents of a nearby signalman's house were killed. The dispatcher who had caused the accident committed suicide a few hours after the accident. Due to the complicated salvage, the adjacent neighbourhood had to be evacuated.

=== Modernisation and barrier-free reconstruction ===
On 11 April 2008, representatives of the state of Bavaria and Deutsche Bahn signed an agreement for the redevelopment of the station. The construction of the station would begin in September 2008 and be completed by the end of 2010, with works on the station building be completed in 2012. The federal and state governments and Deutsche Bahn intended to invest around €15 million. Among other things, a new platform underpass with escalators and lifts would be built. The platform height would be adjusted to the height of the trains and the platform canopies would be completely replaced. After the modernisation of the station approximately 30,000 travellers are expected to use it daily (2008: 23,000).

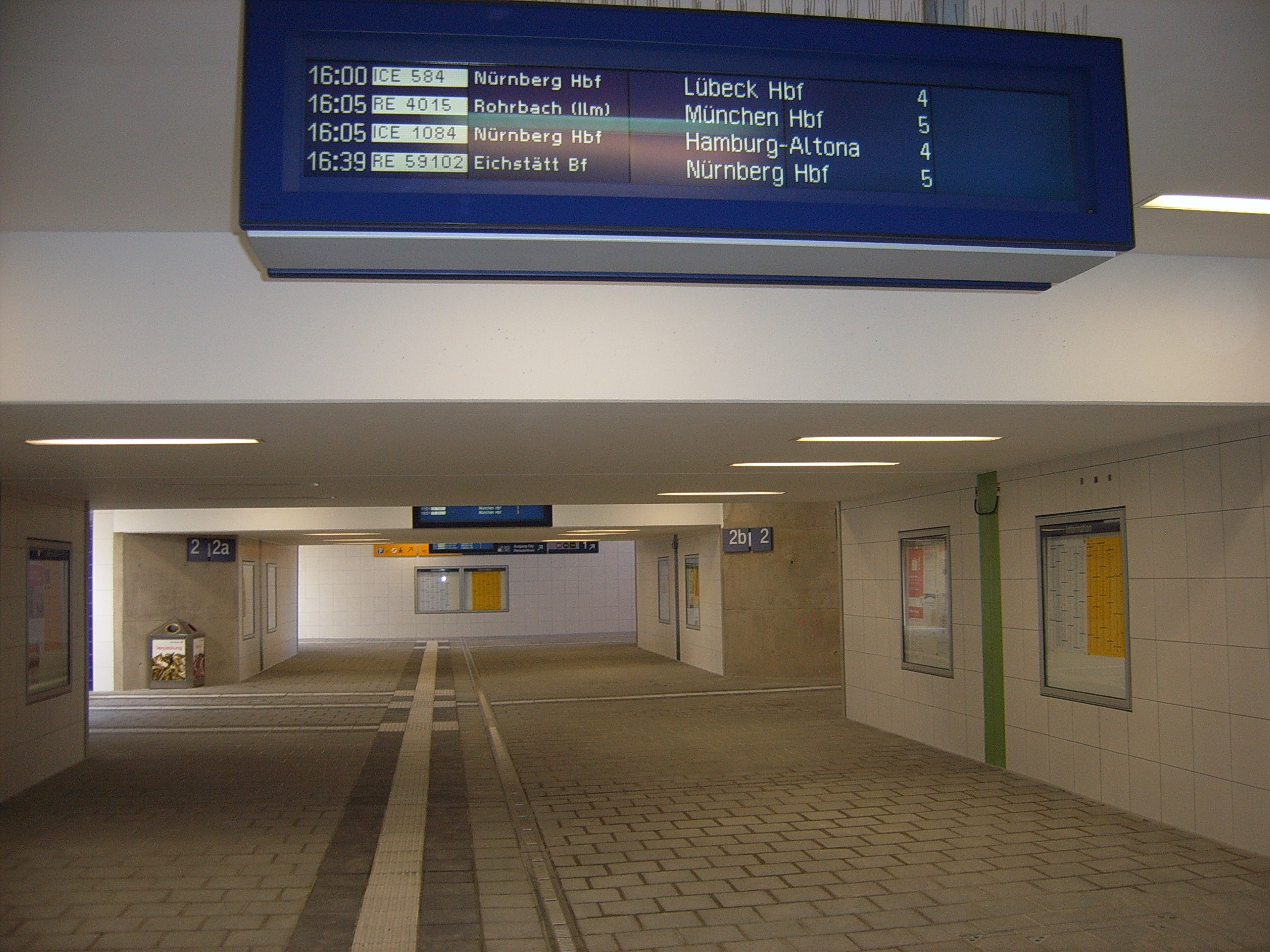
The new platform underpass was put into operation on 31 August 2012

In November 2009, it was also announced that Deutsche Bahn had sold a 2,300 square metre site to the north of the station building to an investor for the Steigenberger Hotels group who intended to build an InterCity Hotel there. Deutsche Bahn intended to finance the reconstruction of the station from the proceeds from the sale of the land.

The construction work was aborted in October 2010 and it was announced in December 2010 that its continuation would go to Europe-wide tender. Work would start again on 1 June 2011 and be completed by the end of December 2012. It was later announced that the completion date had been postponed to 29 March 2013.

Then on 9 June 2011, Deutsche Bahn announced in a press release that a new construction company would take up the work on the station on 4 July 2011. Shortly afterward work began on the installation of temporary bridges for the creation of the new underpass, which was commissioned on 31 August 2012. The next stage of construction was the partial demolition and backfilling of the old platform underpass. In addition, in mid-August excavation began for the new Intercity Hotel. The hotel opened on 1 March 2014.

== Services ==
Due to the central location of Ingolstadt in the centre of in Bavaria, the station is an important hub in Deutsche Bahn's network. Four lines meet and cross here from all directions. This results in the following train services:

=== Long-distance ===
Line	Route	Frequency
ICE 18	Hamburg-Altona – Hamburg – Berlin – Halle – Erfurt – Nuremberg – Ingolstadt – Munich	Some trains
ICE 25	Hamburg-Altona – Hamburg – Hanover – Göttingen – Kassel – Würzburg – Nuremberg – Ingolstadt – Munich	Hourly
ICE 28	(Hamburg –) Berlin – Leipzig – Erfurt – Nuremberg – Ingolstadt – Munich	Some trains
ICE 41	(Dortmund –) Essen – Düsseldorf – Köln Messe/Deutz – Frankfurt – Würzburg – Nuremberg – Ingolstadt – Munich	Some trains

=== Regional ===
Line	Route	Frequency
RE 1 München- Nürnberg- Express	Munich – Ingolstadt – Allersberg – Nuremberg	Every 2 hours; hourly on the weekend
RE 1 München- Nürnberg- Express	Munich – Pfaffenhofen – Ingolstadt – Eichstätt Bahnhof	Two trains, Mon-Fri only
RB 13	Ingolstadt – Schrobenhausen – Aichach – Augsburg	Hourly
RB 14	Ingolstadt – Ingolstadt Nord – Eichstätt Bahnhof – Eichstätt Stadt	Hourly in the peak
RB 15	Regensburg – Ingolstadt – Donauwörth – Günzburg – Neu-Ulm – Ulm	Every two hours
RB 16	Munich – Pfaffenhofen – Ingolstadt – Eichstätt Bahnhof – Treuchtlingen (– Nuremberg)	Hourly; two-hourly: Treuchtlingen – Nuremberg
RB 17	Regensburg - Ingolstadt	Every two hours, only Mon-Fri
RE 18	Ingolstadt – Regensburg – Plattling	Every two hours on the weekend

Ingolstadt Hbf is a node for the regular interval timetable, with Regionalbahn (RB) services from Augsburg, Regensburg and Ulm/Donauwörth meeting there on the hour and trains of the München-Nürnberg-Express meeting there every two hours, thus provide timely interchanges in all directions. Also at the top of the hour, services on the overlapping Intercity-Express (ICE) lines 25 and 28 on the Munich-Nuremberg line stop hourly, so these also provide direct connections to regional services. The Munich–Ingolstadt–Treuchtlingen–Nuremberg Regional-Express, which runs every two hours, overlaps with the Munich–Ingolstadt–Treuchtlingen RB service, which also runs every two hours, jointly providing an hourly service. The services of these lines meet on the half hour when they are overtaken by the ICE trains running on line 41, which do not stop in Ingolstadt. In the peak hour many extra services run that do not have synchronised meetings in Ingolstadt, mostly on the Munich–Ingolstadt–Eichstätt route, which has strong commuting traffic. Ingolstadt station is used each day by an average of 15,000 passengers.

=== Connections to the bus network ===
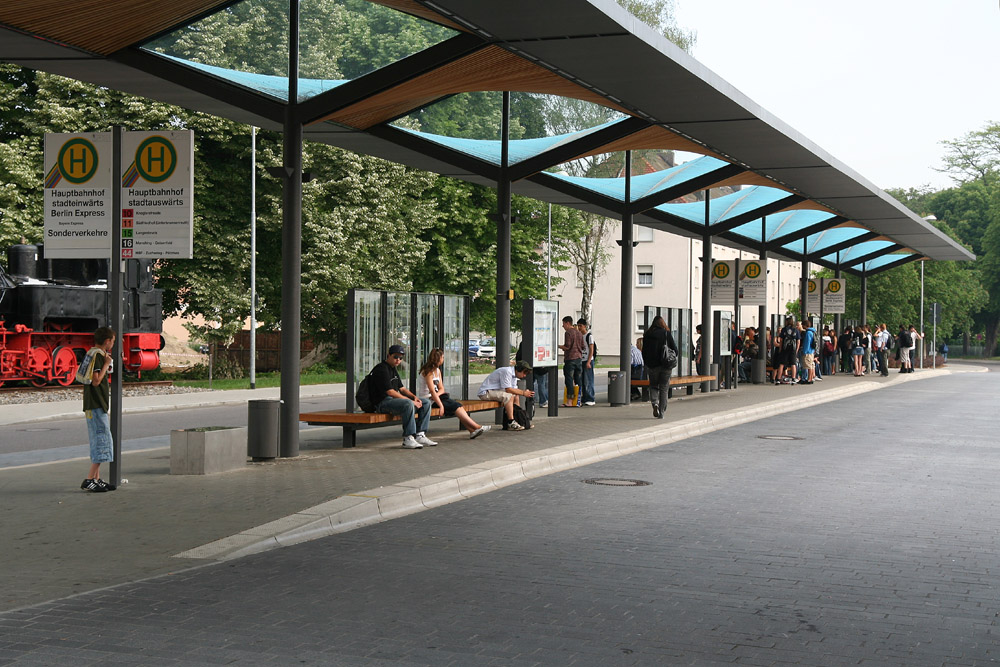
The newly built Hauptbahnhof bus stop

In front of the station there is a modern bus station. Its roof construction was awarded the BDA (Bund Deutscher Architekten, Federation of German Architects) prize in the "urban space" category in 2006. Here transfers can be made to bus routes 10, 11, 16, 17, 18, 31, 44, X11, 9221, 9226, N12, N14 and S6 of the INVG (Ingolstädter Verkehrsgesellschaft mbH, Ingolstädt municipal transport company) towards the city centre and the city's suburbs. On average, about 4,000 passengers use INVG buses each day to the station. It also runs line 6008 RBO to Regensburg. A taxi stand is also integrated into the bus station.

Line	Route
10	Herschelstraße - ZOB - Hauptbahnhof - Schulzentrum Südwest - Knoglersfreude
11	Audi - ZOB - Hauptbahnhof - Südfriedhof - Seehof - Urnenfelderstraße
16	Klinikum - Westpark - ZOB - Hauptbahnhof - Unsernherrn - Manching - Geisenfeld
17	Hauptbahnhof - Pionierkaserne - Manchinger Straße - Steinheilstraße
18	ZOB - Hauptbahnhof - Baar-Ebenhausen - Reichertshofen - Langenbruck
31	Oberhaunstadt - Nordbahnhof - Rathausplatz - Schulzentrum Südwest - Hauptbahnhof
44	(GVZ -) Audi - Waldeysenstraße - Nordfriedhof - Nordbahnhof - ZOB - Hauptbahnhof - Oberbrunnenreuth - Zuchering - Hagau (- Karlshuld - Pöttmes)
X11	Hauptbahnhof - Audi TE
9221	(Riedenburg - Bettbrunn -) Kasing - Kösching - Lenting - Oberhaunstadt - Nordbahnhof - ZOB (- Hauptbahnhof)
9226	Appertshofen - Stammham - Hepberg - Lenting - Oberhaunstadt - Nordbahnhof - ZOB (- Hauptbahnhof)
N12	ZOB - Hauptbahnhof - Südfriedhof - Unterbrunnenreuth - Seehof - Urnenfelderstraße
N14	ZOB - Hauptbahnhof - Oberbrunnenreuth - Zuchering - Hagau
S6	Audi - Nordbahnhof - Rathausplatz - Hauptbahnhof - Zuchering - Hagau - Karlskron
6008	RBO-Linie Regensburg – Saal/Donau – Abensberg – Neustadt/Donau – Hauptbahnhof

== Infrastructure ==
=== Entrance building ===
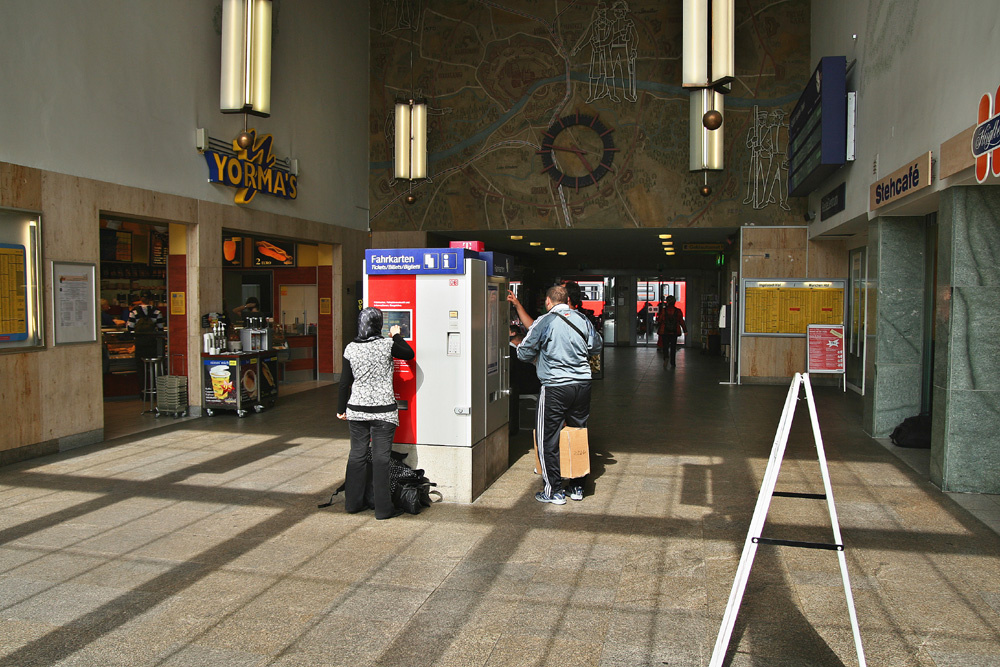
Concourse of Ingolstadt station with travel centre and bakery (right), a small supermarket (left), bookstore (back left), flower shop (back right) and access to the platforms (centre)

The entrance building stands on the western side of the tracks. The DB travel centre is open from 06:00 to 19:00 from Monday to Friday, from 07:30 to 18:00 on Saturday and from 09:00 to 18:30 on Sunday. Outside of these hours vending machines are available.

There is also some rooms in the station building for Deutsche Bahn, including the office for the management of the station. There is also offices of the Federal Police as well as an office of the Bahnhofsmission charity, which provides travellers and the homeless with assistance. For the needs of travellers, there is a bakery, a small supermarket, a bookstore and a florist. There is also a restaurant in the station with a beer garden and a Bierstüberl (“beer parlour").

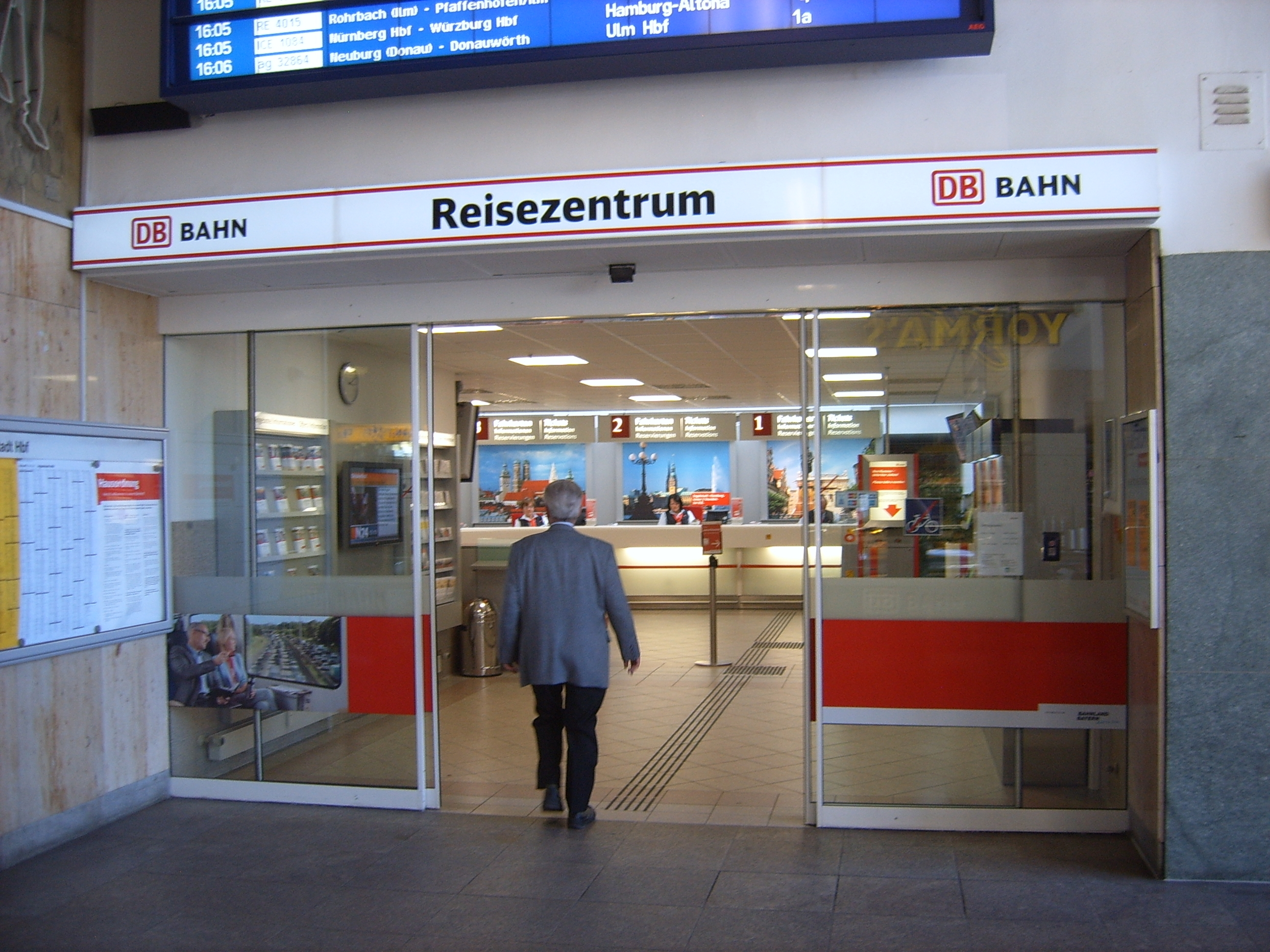
The modernised travel centre

=== Parking station and shopping mall ===
Adjacent to the southern end of the station building is an eight-storey parking station that can accommodate about 800 cars and 300 bicycles. On the ground floor of the parking garage there are a Sixt car rental business, a key-cutting business, cleaning business, an insurance office, a city of Ingolstadt tourist information office and toilets.

Southwest of the station building there is another parking garage that has space for 300 cars.

=== Platforms and railway tracks ===
Ingolstadt Hauptbahnhof has four platforms with seven tracks that have a platform height of 76 cm with the exception of track 1 (38 cm). Track 1 is the “house” platform with a length of 330 m. Track 2/3 are located on an island platform with a length of 410 m and track 4/5 are on an island platform with a length of 428 m. Long-distance trains stop only on tracks 3 and 4, since these are the main through tracks. Tracks 6 and 7 are located on a 193 m-long island platform, which is used exclusively by local services. On platform 2/3 is the "Service Team", which is responsible for providing services to passengers on the platforms. Access to the platforms is via an underpass. Due to the lack of lifts, physically disabled people still have to use a ground-level crossing at the northern end of the platforms, which can only be used with the accompaniment of the service staff.

=== Marshalling yard ===
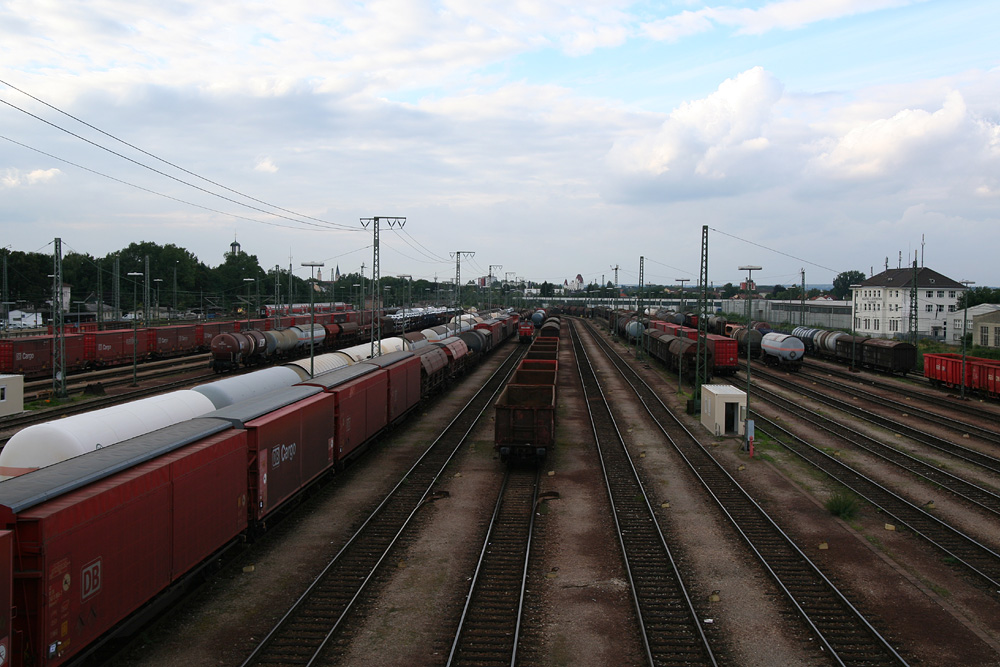
View of the northern part of the marshalling yard

Immediately to the east of the passenger station there is a marshalling yard where there are numerous tracks for the marshalling of freight trains. The marshalling of trains is facilitated by a hump.

=== Depot ===
At the south end of the yard there is a locomotive depot (Bahnbetriebswerk) operated by DB Schenker Rail.

== See also ==
- Rail transport in Germany
- Railway stations in Germany
