= Ingolstadt Nord station =

Railway station in Ingolstadt, Germany

Ingolstadt Nord
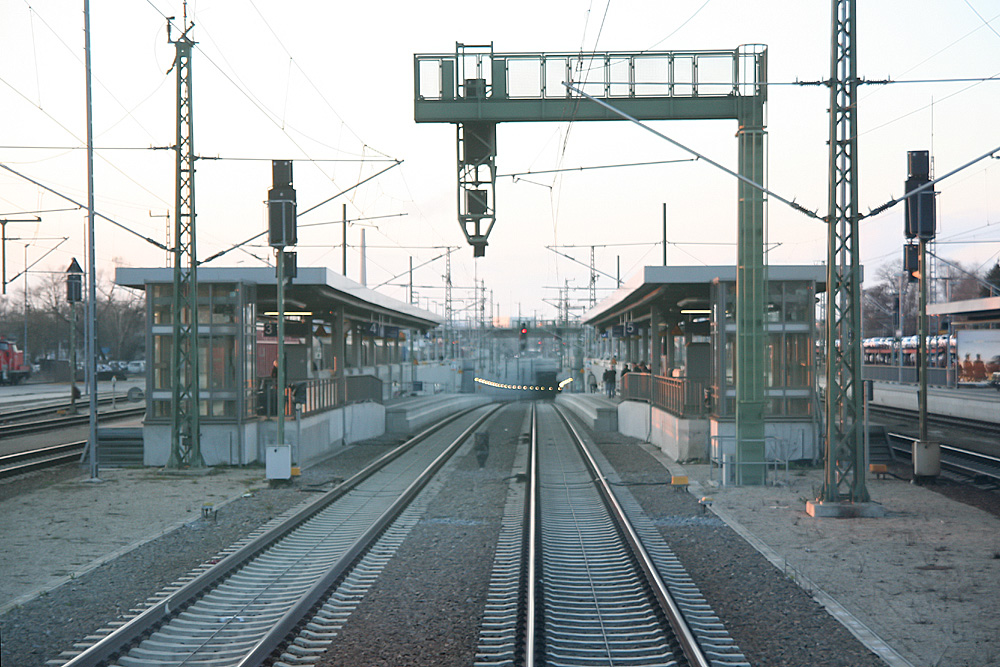
- Ingolstadt Nord station: view from driving car of the Munich-Nuremberg Express looking north

General information
- Location: Ingolstadt, Bavaria; Germany
- Coordinates: 48°46′24″N 11°25′57″E
- Owner: Deutsche Bahn
- Operator: DB InfraGO
- Lines: Nuremberg–Ingolstadt (KBS 900); Munich–Ingolstadt–Treuchtlingen (KBS 990); Ingolstadt–Riedenburg (closed)
- Platforms: 5

Other information
- Station code: 2994
- DS100 code: MIN
- IBNR: 8003076
- Category: 3
- Fare zone: VGI: 100
- Website: www.bahnhof.de; stationsdatenbank.de

History
- Opened: 1869/1870

Passengers
- < 2,500 (2006)

Services
Preceding station	DB Regio Bayern	Following station
Kinding (Altmühltal) towards Nürnberg Hbf	RE 1	Ingolstadt Hbf towards München Hbf
Ingolstadt Audi towards Nürnberg Hbf	RB 16	Ingolstadt Hbf towards München Hbf
Preceding station		Following station
Ingolstadt Audi towards Eichstätt Stadt	RB 14	Ingolstadt Hbf Terminus
Preceding station		Following station
Terminus	RB 17	Ingolstadt Hbf towards Plattling
Location
- Location within Bavaria Location within Germany Location within Europe

Ingolstadt Nord station (also called the Nordbahnhof in German, meaning "North station") is the second operational passenger station in the town of Ingolstadt, in the state of Bavaria in southern Germany. The other station is Ingolstadt Hauptbahnhof.

The station is entered in the official list of Deutsche Bahn station abbreviations as MIN and is classified by Deutsche Bahn as a category 3 station. The station is overseen by the station management at Rosenheim.

== Operationals importance ==
The new high-speed railway from Ingolstadt to Nuremberg branches off the old Munich–Ingolstadt–Treuchtlingen (timetable no. KBS 990). The high-speed tracks begin turning out even within the station limits in order to run into the Audi Tunnel which is immediately next to the station. There is also a heavily used goods siding which branches off to the refineries that are located in the eastern part of the city.

=== Passenger services ===
The Nordbahnhof is only served by regional train services: the Regionalexpress (RE) and Regionalbahn (RB) trains. Intercity-Express (ICE) and InterCity (IC) trains pass through without stopping. A summary of passenger services at the station is shown in the table below:

Train class	Route	Frequency
RE 1	München-Nürnberg-Express; Munich – Ingolstadt – Ingolstadt Nord – Allersberg – Nuremberg	Every 2 hours
RB 14	Ingolstadt – Ingolstadt Nord – Eichstätt – Treuchtlingen (– Nuremberg)	Every 2 hours
RB 16	Munich – Ingolstadt – Ingolstadt Nord – Eichstätt Bahnhof – Eichstätt Stadt	Every 2 hours
RB 16	München – Pfaffenhofen – Ingolstadt (– Ingolstadt Nord)	Some trains
RB 17	Regensburg – Ingolstadt Nord	Approximately hourly (Mon–Fri)

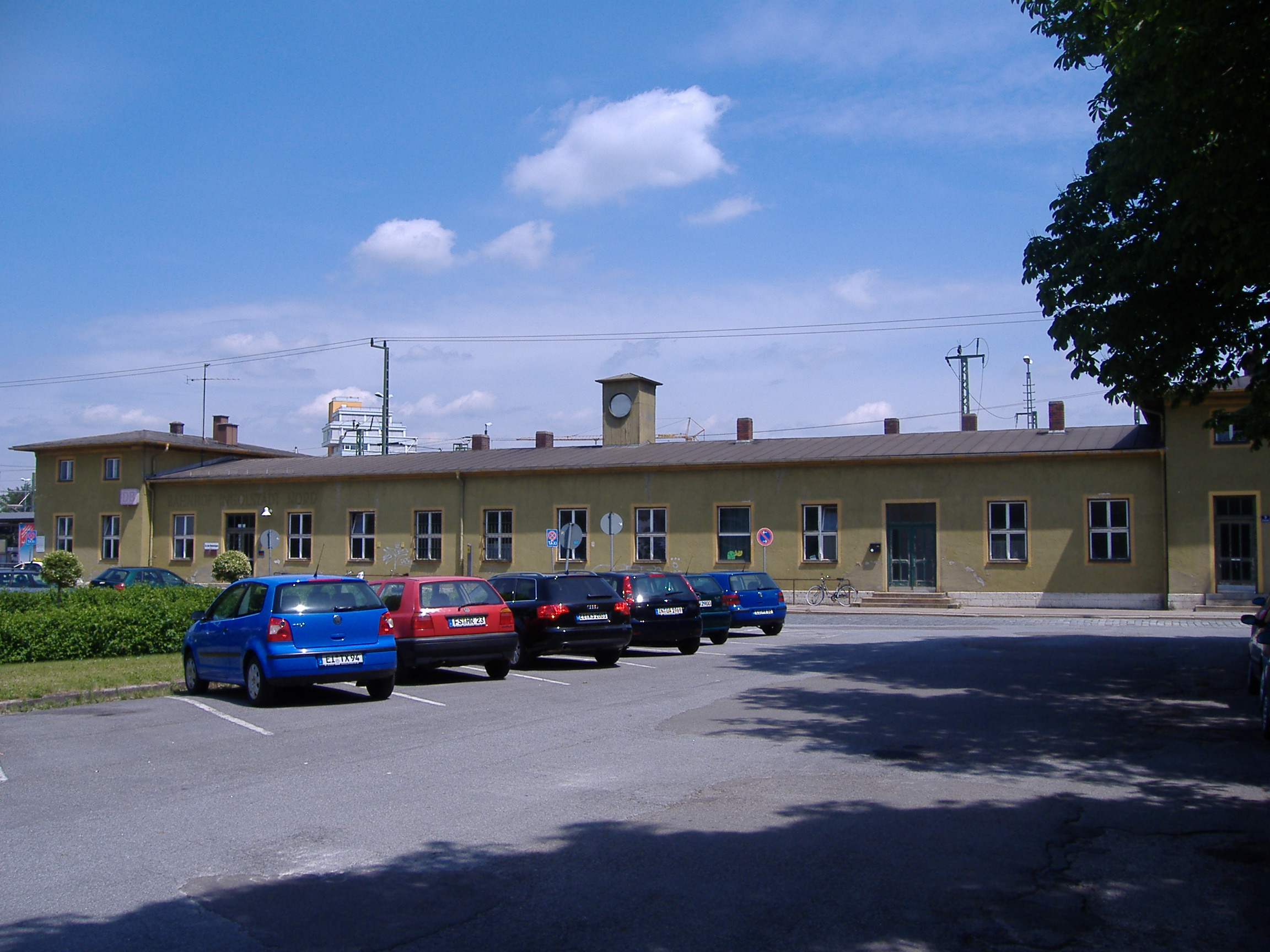
Station building at Ingolstadt Nord

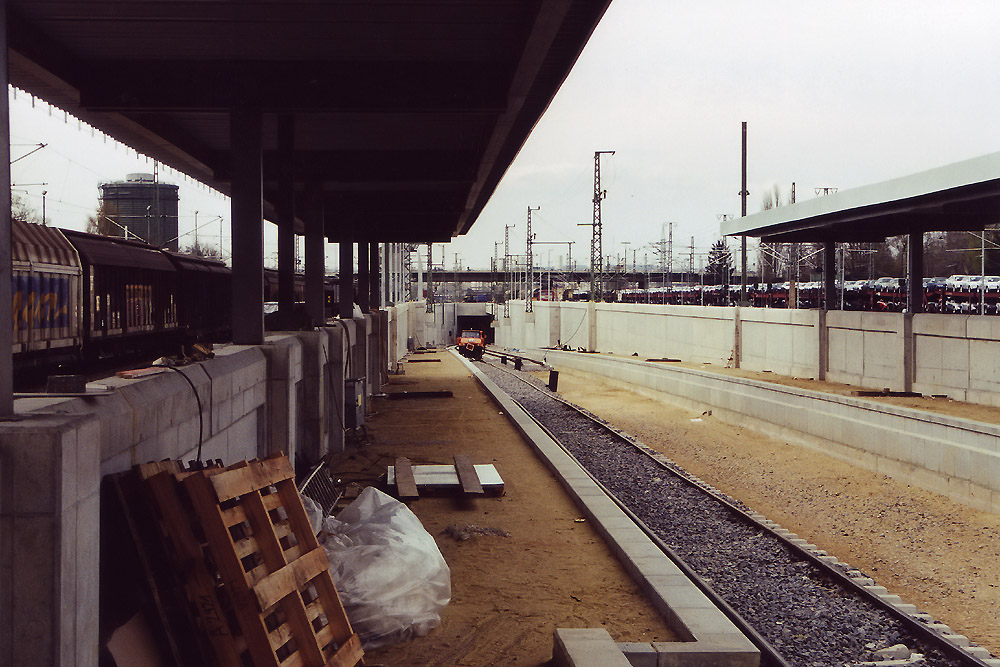
The Nordbahnhof during the rebuilding phase in 2002

In addition several extra trains are laid on during rush hours between Ingolstadt Nord and Eichstätt and between Ingolstadt Nord and Munich. Because the Nordbahnhof, unlike the Hauptbahnhof, is located close to the town centre and not far from the Audi factory, it is used particularly by schoolchildren, students and Audi employees travelling to and from the area.

=== Goods traffic ===
Goods traffic plays a major role at Ingolstadt Nord. Numerous goods trains arrive with manufacturing parts for the Audi factory. These trains are detached in the station and shunted into the car manufacturer's industrial sidings. The factory has an extensive set of tracks that are busy around the clock.

In Ingolstadt Nord there is also a branch line, several kilometres long, that is still used by goods traffic. This splits again at the edge of the town into various goods sidings leading to two oil refineries and the InterPark industrial estate.

== Infrastructure ==
The station has an extensive track system which includes five tracks with platforms (nos. 3 to 7) and which are used by passenger trains. Tracks 4 and 5 belong to the new high-speed route and only trains of the Munich-Nuremberg Express stop here. All platforms have a height of 76 cm. Tracks 3, 6 and 7 are 270 m long; tracks 4 and 5 are only 170 m long. All platforms have lifts; platforms 4 and 5 are only partly suitable for wheelchairs due to their steep slopes. Apart from 3 ticket machines, two snack vending machines and a toilet block there are no services at the station.

The station building, dating from 1869/1870, and the station forecourt are currently (2007) in poor structural condition. In the near future, however, a conversion is planned which should see the town of Ingolstadt purchasing the station building from Deutsche Bahn, and converting it into a cultural centre. However, there are no firm plans yet. In addition, there is a plan to build a multi-storey car park with 290 bays and an integrated kiosk, which will greatly improve the parking situation for travellers. It was announced that the necessary real estate would be bought in September or October 2007 and that work would begin in spring 2008.

== See also ==
- Royal Bavarian State Railways
- List of railway stations in Bavaria
