= München-Nürnberg-Express =

Higher-speed rail service in Bavaria

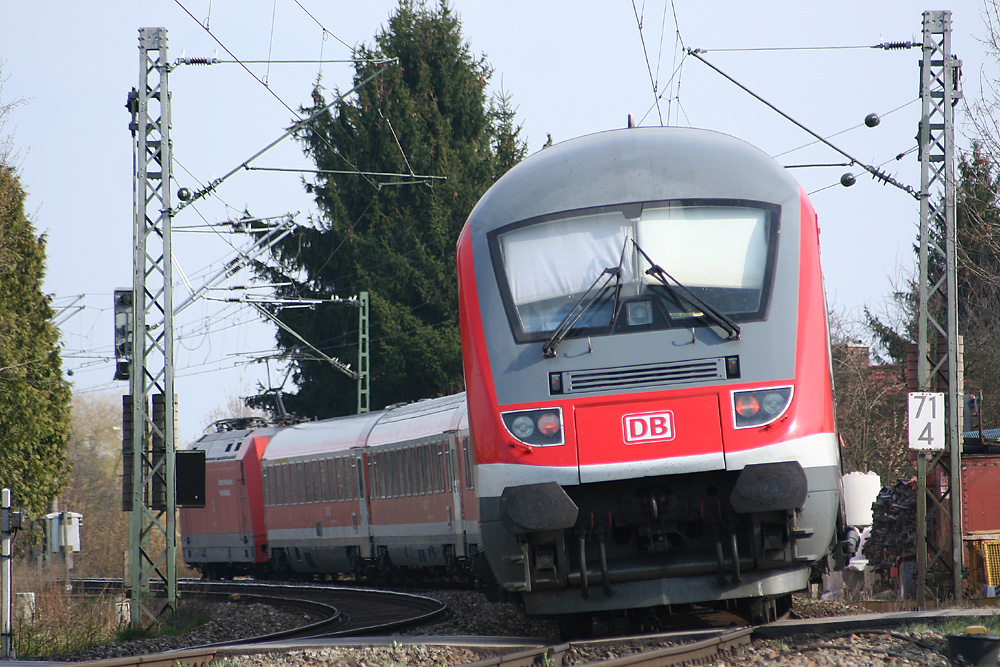
- München-Nürnberg-Express near Reichertshofen between Munich and Ingolstadt

Service
- Route number: 900

Technical
- Line length: 171 km
- Operating speed: 200 km/h (125 mph) max.

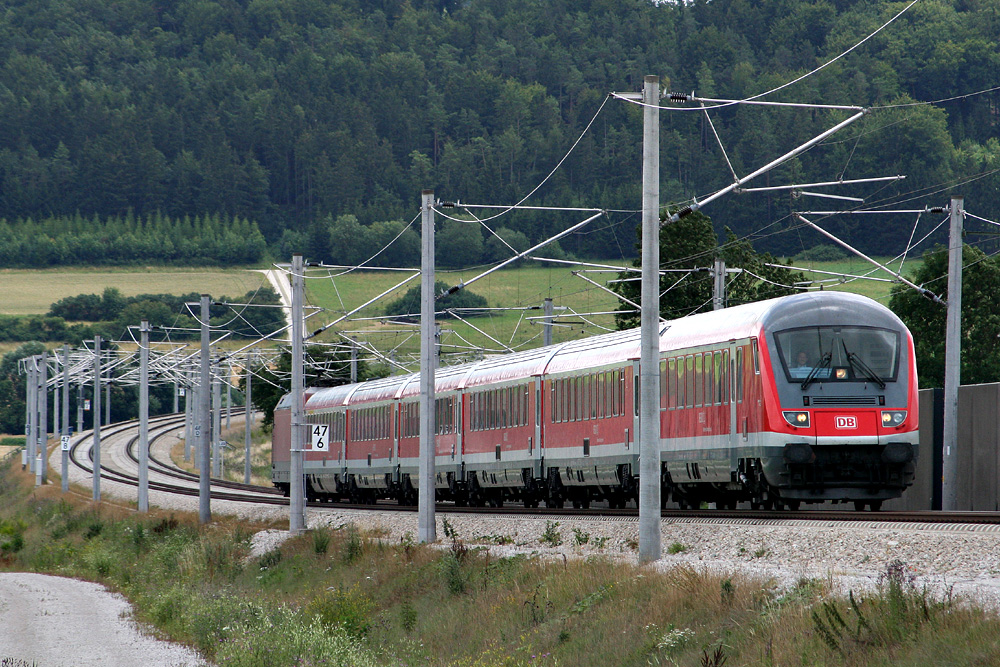
München-Nürnberg-Express pushed by a Class 101 engine near Greding

The München-Nürnberg-Express (literally: Munich-Nuremberg Express) is a RegionalExpress train service in the southern German state of Bavaria, connecting the two main cities of the state, Munich and Nuremberg. With its maximum speed of 200 km/h (125 mph), the train is currently (as of 2011) the fastest regional train service in Germany. The train was formerly known under the project name FRESH, expanding to FRanken-Express über die Schnellfahrstrecke in die LandesHauptstadt (FRanconia Express via the High speed line to the state Capital).

== Service ==
The München-Nürnberg-Express has been in service since December 10, 2006. Between Ingolstadt and Nuremberg, the service uses the Nuremberg–Ingolstadt high-speed railway and continues to Munich on the Munich–Treuchtlingen railway. As of 2007, the München-Nürnberg-Express is the only regional service to use a German high-speed line in its full length.

The service currently calls at the following stops:

- München Hbf
- Petershausen
- Pfaffenhofen (Ilm)
- Rohrbach (Ilm)
- Ingolstadt Hbf
- Ingolstadt Nord
- Kinding (Altmühltal)
- Allersberg (Rothsee)
- Nürnberg Hbf

Trains run bi-hourly between 5:00 and 23:00, with supplemental services during rush hour. Together with the Allersberg-Express, there is a half-hour interval between Allersberg and Nuremberg from 5:00 to 8:00. One train, departing 17:05 from Munich, does not call at Petershausen any more. Deutsche Bahn claimed too high a demand as the reason.

The 171 km journey takes about 1 hour 45 minutes with a prolonged 15-minute stay at Ingolstadt Hauptbahnhof to allow the service to be overtaken by ICE trains. In Ingolstadt, the service has direct connections to ICE and regional services to Augsburg, Regensburg and Ulm. In Nuremberg, connections to the ICE trains to the Ruhr region and many further regional services can be made. According to Deutsche Bahn sources, about 5,000 passengers per day used the train in the first weeks of service. The train is the only regional train in Bavaria where tickets are sold on board; on-board ticket sales ceased in the other trains on April 1, 2007.

== Rolling stock ==
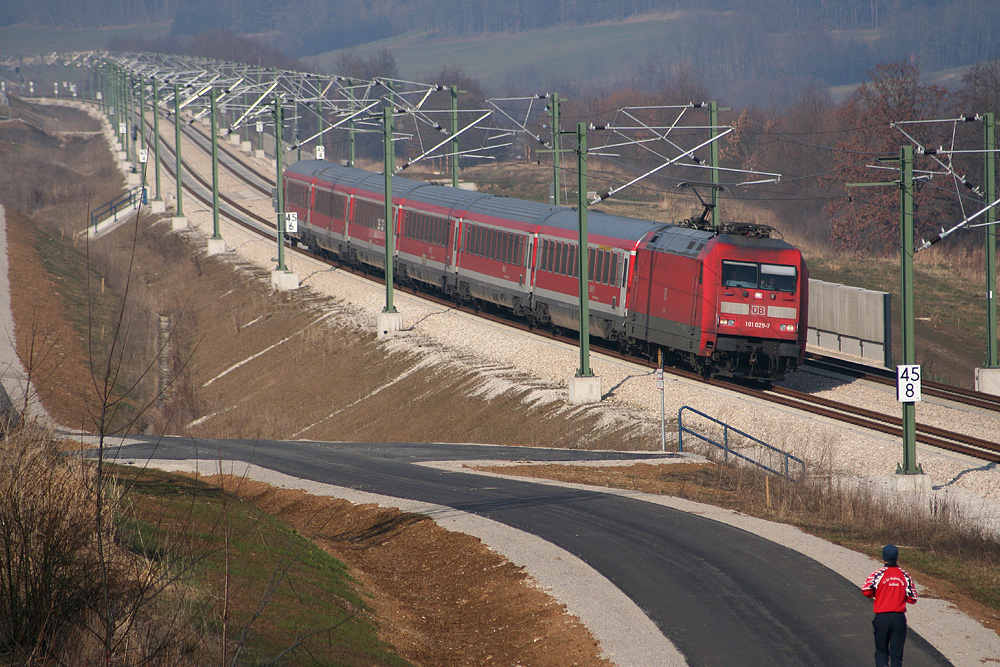
München-Nürnberg-Express on the open line

The München-Nürnberg-Express was the first regional train in Germany with a maximum speed of 200 km/h after the suspension of the InterRegio. This high speed is necessary to not hinder the ICE traffic, which travels at speeds of up to 300 km/h. However, since Deutsche Bahn does not own regional rolling stock capable of travelling at such high speeds, push-pull InterCity train compositions are used for the service.

Between September and November 2006, 26 coaches (among them three control cars) were specially equipped for the München-Nürnberg-Express in the Neumünster workshop. The coaches were repainted to the red livery used by regional trains. The interior remains largely unchanged from the regular InterCity, providing tables, folding tables, reading lamps and laptop sockets. The normal InterCity passenger information system is installed in the coaches, however seats cannot be reserved on the train. Coaches are pressurised to avoid uncomfortable pressure variations in tunnels. The train does not have a buffet car, but snacks and drinks are served from a trolley. The train is a non smoking train, just like any other German train.

Since December 2020, services have been operated by Škoda push–pull train sets consisting of a Škoda 109 E3 (DB class 102) locomotive, five intermediate cars and a control car. Previously the train was usually operated with refurbished coaches and a Class 101 engine. On occasion, a Class 120 or Class 182 engine was used as well. A full trainset normally consists of six coaches:

- Control car: driver's compartment, 31 2nd class seats, 16 bicycle racks and five folding seats, two wheelchair stands, disabled toilet
- four saloon coaches Bpmz (80 2nd class seats each), toilet and luggage rack at each end of the coach. In total, 20 cars were repainted for the MNE.
- End coach: open seating area with 40 seats (2nd class), mother and child compartment with six seats (of which two folding), special compartment with six seats, two 1st class compartments (six seats each) and conductor's compartment. Four Bvmsz cars were rebuilt into these special coaches (now called ABvmsz).

On weekday mornings, a ten-coach train pulled by two Class 101 engines operates on the line. Due to the length of the train, the last four coaches are locked between Ingolstadt and Nuremberg, as they do not come to stop at the platforms on the high speed line.

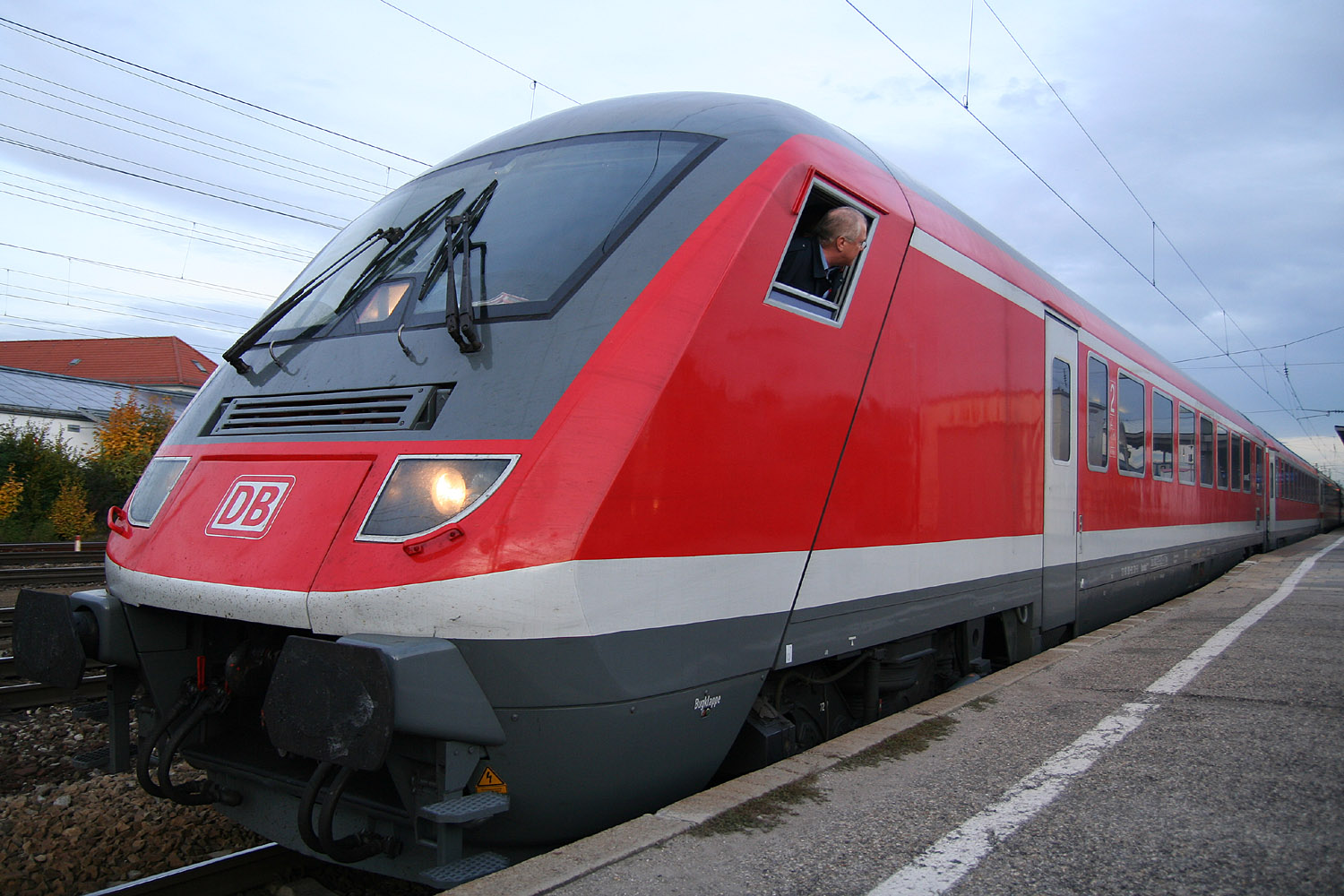
Cab car

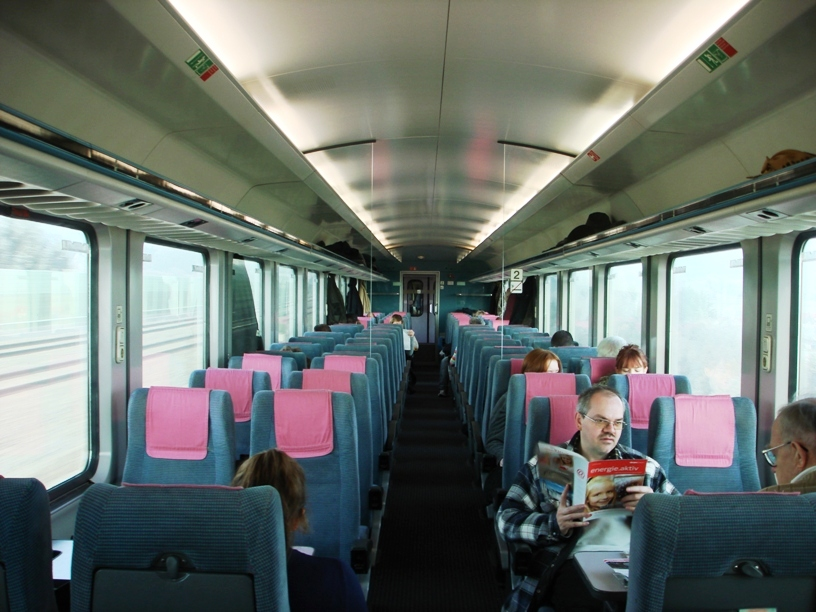
2nd class interior

In June 2013 new trainsets for the München-Nürnberg-Express were ordered from Škoda Transportation and were due to enter service in 2016. Due to technical problems that delayed a restricted certification until 2019. Reliability problems then led to DB Regio refusing to take delivery. They units began in-service testing on 16 November 2020 on services in the Altmühl Valley and all the trainsets are due to be progressively introduced into service on the München-Nürnberg-Express during 2021.

Each set consists of a Class 102 and 6 double deck coaches including a control car. The new double deck carriages raise the number of seats in each train to 676 from 413. The new trains are slightly slower operating at a maximum speed of 190 km/h as opposed to the previous maximum speed of 200 km/h.

Due to reliability problems, the new train sets have been supported by the original rolling stock since December 2024.

Starting in October 2026 the six Škoda Push-Pull Trainsets are for sale with availability from December 2028 as they will be replaced by Siemens Desiro HC EMU's.
