= Straubing station =

Railway station in Straubing, Germany

Straubing
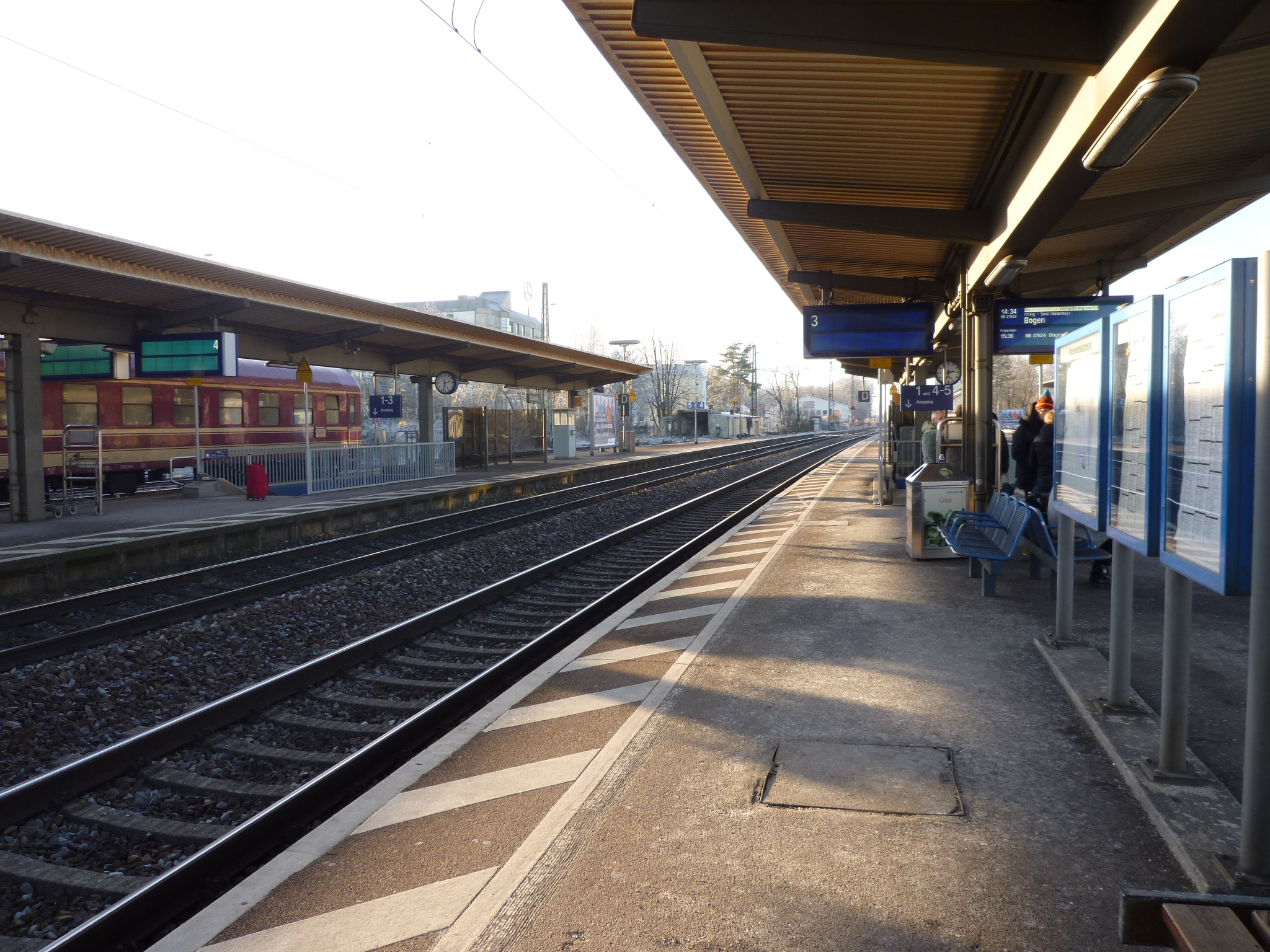

General information
- Location: Straubing, Bavaria; Germany
- Coordinates: 48°52′38″N 12°34′27″E
- Owner: Deutsche Bahn
- Operator: DB Netz; DB Station&Service
- Lines: Passau–Obertraubling (KBS 880); Straubing–Miltach (KBS 932)
- Platforms: 3
- Tracks: 5
- Connections: 1, 2, 4, 8, 10, 15, 16, 21, 22, 23, 24, 25, 28, 33, 53, 710, 1005, 1007, 1013, 1018, 1019, 1020, 1026

Other information
- Station code: NST
- IBNR: 8000095
- Category: 3
- Fare zone: RVV: 7
- Website: www.bahnhof.de; BEG-Stationssteckbrief

History
- Opened: 1859; 167 years ago
- Electrified: 1959; 67 years ago

Services
Preceding station		Following station
Straubing Ost towards Bogen	RB 32	Radldorf (Niederbay) towards Neufahrn (Niederbay)
Preceding station		Following station
Sünching towards Nürnberg Hbf	RE 50	Straßkirchen towards Plattling
Radldorf (Niederbay) towards Ingolstadt Nord	RB 17	Straßkirchen towards Plattling
Radldorf (Niederbay) towards Neumarkt (Oberpfalz)	RB 51	Straßkirchen towards Plattling
Location

Straubing station is the railway station of the Lower Bavarian city of Straubing. It is located on the Regensburg–Passau and Straubing–Bogen railway lines. The station has five platform tracks. Additional stations in the city area are the Straubing Ost and Ittling stations. Trains are operated by Deutsche Bahn Fernverkehr, Südostbayernbahn and Agilis.

== Services ==
In the 2026 timetable, the following services stop at the station:

Train type	Route	Frequency (mins)
RE 50	Nürnberg – Regensburg – Straubing – Plattling	120
RB 32	Neufahrn (Niederbay) − Straubing − Bogen	60
RB 51	Neumarkt − Regensburg − Straubing – Plattling	60
