= Regensburg (disambiguation) =

Regensburg also called Ratisbon in English and Ratisbonne in French, a German city in Bavaria, south-east Germany

Not to be confused with similarly named Regensberg, a Swiss Municipality

Regensburg may also refer to:

== Places ==
- Principality of Regensburg, was a principality within the Holy Roman Empire and the Confederation of the Rhine which existed between 1803 and 1810. Its capital was the city of Regensburg, now in Bavaria, Germany
- Regensburg (district), a German district
- Regensburg (electoral district)
- For the district, see . For the similarly named Swiss municipality, see .
- University of Regensburg, a public research university located in Regensburg, Bavaria
- Regensburg Cathedral, cathedral dedicated to St Peter in Regensburg
- Regensburg Synagogue, erected between 1210 and 1227, was an edifice in Old Romanesque style in Regensburg
- Theater Regensburg, also known as the Stadttheater Regensburg, theatre of the city of Regensburg

== People ==
- Sophy Regensburg (1885–1974), American painter

of Regensburg

- Aurelia of Regensburg also known as Aurelia of Ratisbon, (died 1027), an 11th-century Roman Catholic German saint
- Bertold of Regensburg (c. 1220–1272), German preacher during the high Middle Ages
- Bishops of Regensburg (Ratisbon) are bishops of the Roman Catholic Diocese of Regensburg, Bavaria, Germany. The seat of the bishops is Regensburg Cathedral
- Dirmicius of Regensburg, second Abbot of Regensburg, fl. 1121–1133
- Emmeram of Regensburg, Christian bishop, martyr and saint
- Erhard of Regensburg, bishop of Regensburg in the 7th century and saint. Ancient documents call him also Erard and Herhard.
- Judah ben Samuel of Regensburg (1150–1217), also called HeHasid or 'the Pious' in Hebrew, was a leader of the Chassidei Ashkenaz, a movement of Jewish mysticism in Germany
- Marianus Scotus of Regensburg, born Muiredach mac Robartaig, an Irish abbot and scribe
- Petachiah of Regensburg, also known as Petachiah ben Yakov, Moses Petachiah, and Petachiah of Ratisbon, a Bohemian rabbi of the twelfth and early thirteenth centuries

== Others ==
- SSV Jahn Regensburg, a football club in Germany
- Regensburg lecture, or Regensburg address, lecture delivered on 12 September 2006 by Pope Benedict XVI at the University of Regensburg in Germany
- SMS Regensburg, a light cruiser of the Graudenz class built by the German Kaiserliche Marine (Imperial Navy)

== See also ==
- Diet of Regensburg, referring to any of the sessions of the Imperial Diet, Imperial States, or the prince-electors of the Holy Roman Empire which took place in the Imperial City of Regensburg (Ratisbon), now in Germany
- Munich–Regensburg railway, a double track, electrified main line railway, linking Munich and Regensburg
- Regensburg-Prüfening station, one of the three railway stations in the German city of Regensburg
- Regensburg–Weiden railway, a main line railway, which links the Upper Palatine regional capital of Regensburg via Schwandorf to Weiden in der Oberpfalz
- Regensburg–Passau railway, a key transport link from Germany to Austria and other southeast European countries
- Schweinfurt–Regensburg mission was a strategic bombing mission during World War II
- Regensberg (disambiguation), alternative to Regensburg
