= Danube Valley Railway =

Danube Valley Railway (German: Donautalbahn) may refer to:

- the Donaueschingen–Immendingen section of the Black Forest Railway (Baden)
- the Immendingen–Tuttlingen section of the Plochingen–Immendingen railway
- the Tuttlingen–Inzigkofen railway
- the Inzigkofen–Sigmaringen section of the Tübingen–Sigmaringen railway
- the Ulm–Sigmaringen railway
- the Ulm–Neuoffingen section of the Ulm–Augsburg railway
- the Ingolstadt–Neuoffingen railway
- the Regensburg–Ingolstadt railway
