= Regensburg-Prüfening station =

Railway station in Regensburg, Germany

Regensburg Prüfening
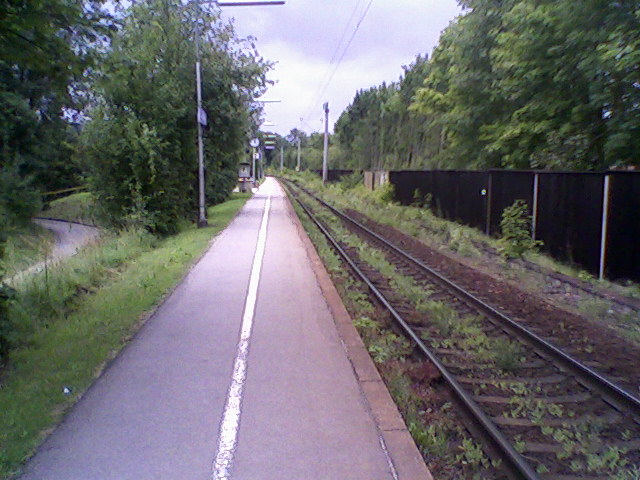
- Platform 3 to Ingolstadt

General information
- Location: Bavaria; Germany
- Coordinates: 49.0118°N 12.0491°E

Other information
- Fare zone: RVV: 1 and 2

Services
| Preceding station | | Following station |
|---|---|---|
| Sinzing towards Ingolstadt Hbf | RE 18 | Regensburg Hbf Terminus |
| Sinzing towards Ingolstadt Nord | RB 17 | Regensburg Hbf towards Plattling |
| Etterzhausen towards Neumarkt (Oberpfalz) | RB 51 | Regensburg Hbf towards Plattling |
Location
- Location within Bavaria Location within Germany

Regensburg-Prüfening station is one of the three railway stations in the German city of Regensburg used for passenger services; the others being Regensburg Hauptbahnhof and Regensburg-Burgweinting. It is located in the west of the city on Prüfeninger Schloßssstraße. In front of the station the track divides into the line to Nuremberg and the Regensburg–Ingolstadt railway to Ingolstadt Hauptbahnhof and Ulm. This crosses the line to Nuremberg shortly after Prüfening station.

Regensburg-Prüfening has three platforms. To the south, are platforms 1 and 2 to Nuremberg, and about 100 m north is platform 3 to Ingolstadt. Only Regionalbahn trains stop at the station, which is classified by Deutsche Bahn as a category 5 station. It has connections to Regensburg's city bus services which stop at the Rennplatz bus stop north of the station.

There are railway services to:

- Regensburg Hbf: two, hourly services (at weekends only every two hours)
- Ingolstadt Hbf: hourly (at weekends every two hours)
- Neumarkt (Oberpfalz): hourly
