= Deggendorf-Plattling Railway =

Railway line in Germany

The Deggendorf–Plattling Railway company (Deggendorf–Plattlinger Eisenbahn AG) was an early German railway company founded in 1865 with an original capital of 300,000 gulden and established to build a railway line between Deggendorf and Plattling in Bavaria, southern Germany. The capital was divided into 3,000 shares of 100 gulden each.

== Railway line and operations ==
The company received a royal concession on 18 February 1865 to build a line operated by standard gauge locomotives for passenger and goods services between Plattling Ostbahn station and Fischerdorf on the right bank of the Danube opposite Deggendorf. Early plans to operate a horse-drawn wagonway were dropped, but they then had to accept that the end of the line would be on the right bank, because the bridge over the Danube, built in 1859, was too weak to take locomotives.

The line ran from the station at Plattling, opened in 1860 by the Bavarian Eastern Railway Company (AG der Bayerischen Ostbahnen) without any large structures, as far as the Danube landing place opposite Deggendorf and had a length of 8,695 m. It was opened on 8 March 1866; operations having already started on 1 March. In 1867 four pairs of trains ran daily between 6 am and 10 pm.

Although the line was able to pay a dividend of 6% in the early years, they let the Ostbahn take over operations on 10 August 1867. On 6 September 1872 a contract was signed transferring the Deggendorf–Plattling Railway in entirety to the Ostbahn for a purchase price of 273,000 gulden.

== Running and rolling stock ==
The company owned two locomotives, four passenger coaches, a mail van and several goods wagons. The light locomotives were 0-4-0 inside frame engines built by the firm of Joseph Anton von Maffei of Munich, with an axle base of only 1.835 m. They were given the names Deggendorf (Maffei 1866/575) and Bayerischer Wald (Maffei 1866/576) and needed 24 minutes to complete the journey. The engines were given numbers D 13 and D 14 by the Ostbahn. The Royal Bavarian State Railways incorporated them into Class D with numbers 1176 and 1177. They were retired in December and October 1895. Previous to that, the Deggendorf had hauled shuttle services between Geiselhöring and Sünching on the Regensburg–Passau railway; the Bayerwald had been diverted to the line from Miltenberg to Amorbach.

== Closure ==
On the construction of the Bavarian Forest railway from Plattling via Deggendorf and Zwiesel to Bayerisch Eisenstein in 1873, the roadbed of the Deggendorf–Plattling line could not be used, because the new railway line had to be laid northwest of the old route due to the steep inclines near the edge of the Bavarian Forest and this required a higher station at Deggendorf. In addition the Ostbahn moved the station at Plattling some several hundred metres further west. As a result, the Deggendorf–Plattling Railway ceased running services on 16 September 1877 on the opening of the Forest railway by the Royal Bavarian State Railways which had taken over the Ostbahn on 15 May 1875.

== Sources ==
- Zeitler, Walther, Eisenbahnen in Niederbayern und in der Oberpfalz, 2. Auflage Amberg, 1997.
- Wolfgang Klee/Ludwig v. Welser, Bayern-Report, Bände 1—5, Fürstenfeldbruck, 1993–1995.
