= Plattling station =

Railway station in Plattling, Germany

Plattling
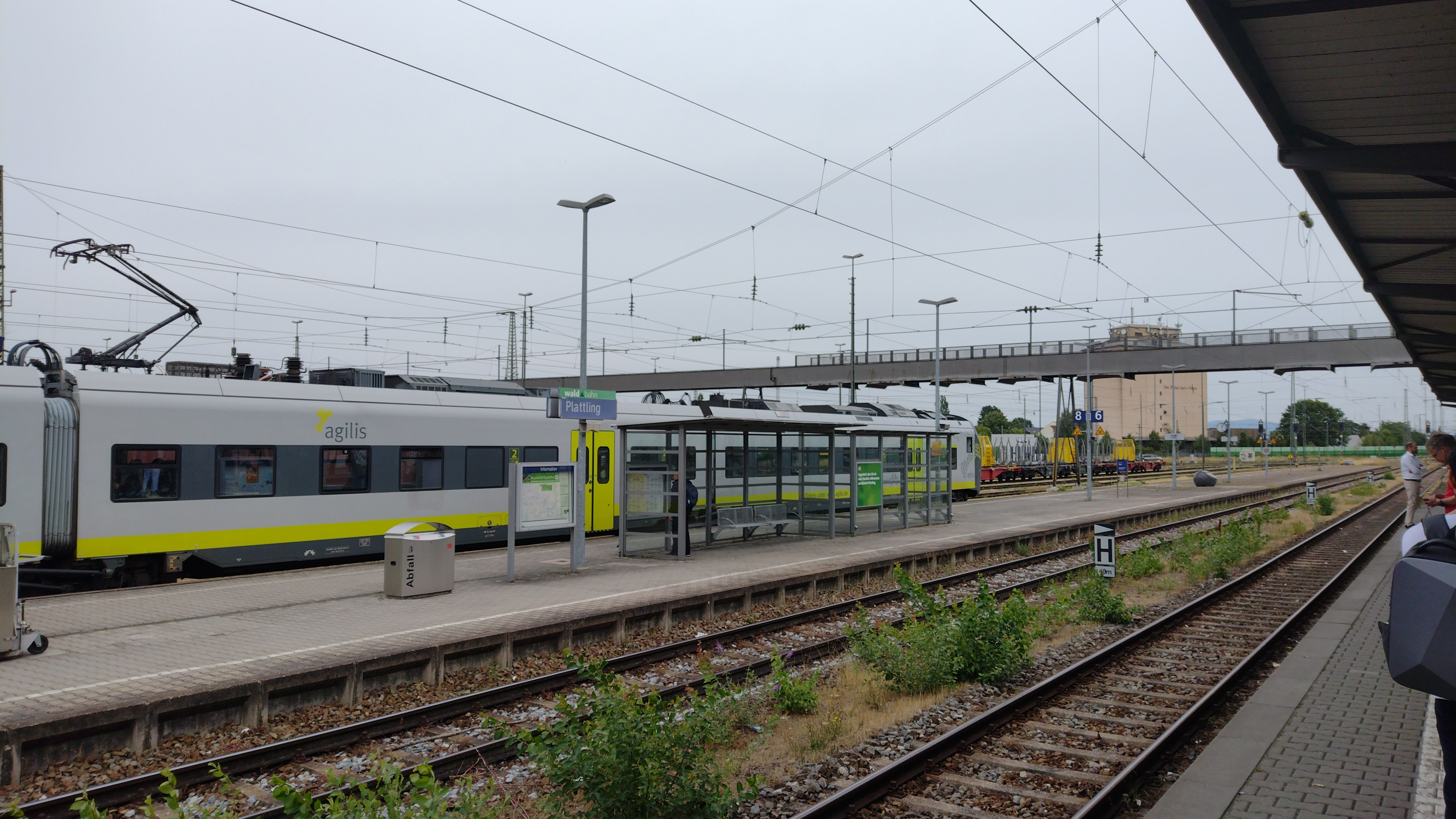
- 2023

General information
- Location: Plattling, Bavaria; Germany
- Coordinates: 48°46.8088′N 12°51.8144′E
- Owner: Deutsche Bahn
- Operator: DB Netz; DB Station&Service
- Lines: Regensburg–Plattling–Passau (KBS 880/KBS 931); (Munich)–Landshut–Plattling (KBS 931); Bavarian Forest Railway (KBS 905)
- Platforms: 7

Other information
- Station code: 4952
- DS100 code: NPL
- IBNR: 8000301
- Category: 3
- Website: www.bahnhof.de

History
- Opened: 20 September 1860

Services
Preceding station	DB Fernverkehr	Following station
Regensburg Hbf towards Hamburg-Altona	ICE 1 Sprinter	Passau Hbf Terminus
Regensburg Hbf towards Dortmund Hbf, Hamburg-Altona or Berlin-Gesundbrunnen	ICE 91	Passau Hbf towards Wien Hbf
Preceding station		Following station
Straßkirchen towards Nürnberg Hbf	RE 50	Osterhofen (Nby) towards Passau Hbf
Straßkirchen towards Ingolstadt Nord	RB 17	Terminus
Straßkirchen towards Neumarkt (Oberpfalz)	RB 51	Terminus
Preceding station	DB Regio Bayern	Following station
Wallersdorf towards München Hbf	RE 3	Osterhofen (Nby) towards Passau Hbf
Preceding station		Following station
Terminus	RB 35	Pankofen towards Bayerisch Eisenstein
Location

Plattling station is a central railway hub in eastern Lower Bavaria in southern Germany.

== History ==
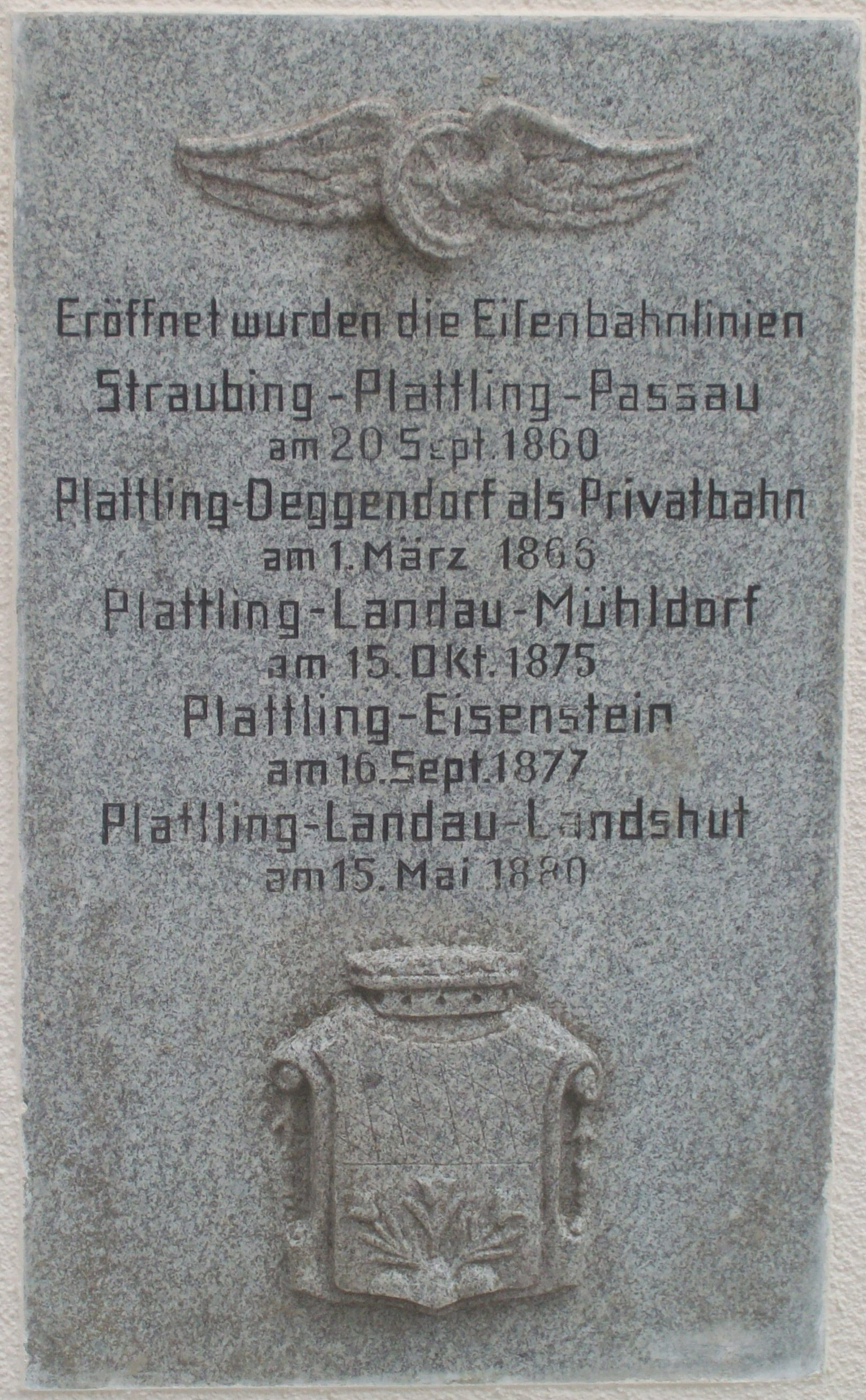
Commemorative tablet at Plattling station

The first station building for Plattling station was erected near the town and the station was opened on 20 September 1860 as the Bavarian Eastern Railway Company's eastern route between Straubing and Passau went into service. From 1866 to 1877 the goods line operated by the Deggendorf-Plattling Railway company ended at goods yard at the western end of the station. When the Bavarian Forest railway was built via Zwiesel to Bayerisch Eisenstein in 1874 the passenger station was moved westwards to accommodate the junction with this route and was built at the same height as the goods station in its present-day location. On 15 October 1875, Plattling was given another junction, this time to the south via Pilsting to Mühldorf (the Mühldorf–Pilsting railway), which was expanded in 1880 by a branch to Landshut.

On 16 April 1945 the entire station was destroyed in a bombing raid that lasted just seven minutes. The station building which was fully demolished during this attack was rebuilt again after the Second World War on the same spot. With the electrification of the main line from Regensburg to Passau in May 1959 and the general changeover of motive power in the DB, the Bahnbetriebswerk at Plattling soon lost its function in maintaining steam locomotives. The last train hauled by a steam locomotive ran on 6 March 1974 from Plattling into the Bavarian Forest. The roundhouse and turntable were dismantled. As a memorial of the steam era, railway fans have put a DRG Class 64 steam engine on display in the station yard.

In the night of 2–3 June 2008 the 4,000 m^{2} (43,000 sq ft) historic locomotive shed burned down to its foundation walls, having served at the time as a warehouse for a paper factory.

== Current situation ==
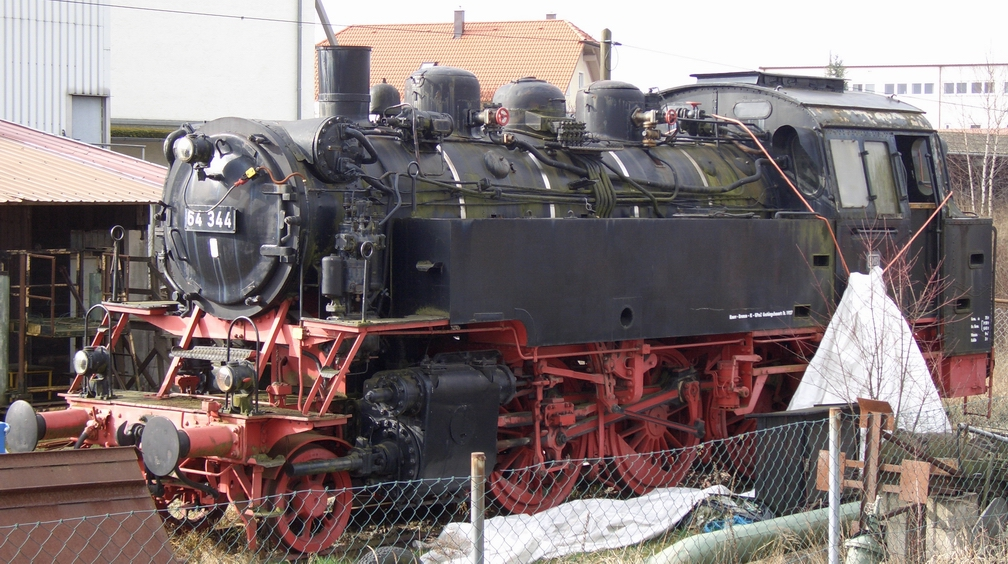
Locomotive 64 344 on display at Plattling station

Seven tracks are used for passenger services. In the station building is a ticket machine, a cafe and a newsagent.

Plattling station today is the central transport hub in the eastern part of Lower Bavaria. Trains from all four directions meet shortly before the hour every hour.

- Long-distance and local trains run on the twin-tracked, electrified east-west main line from Regensburg to Passau (timetable no. KBS 880). Since December 2007 ICEs from Frankfurt to Vienna stop every two hours, as well as occasional IC trains. In addition there is a lot of goods traffic, especially to and from Austria.
- Regionalbahn and Regional-Express trains run to Munich on the single-tracked electrified southern route to Landshut and Munich (KBS 931). From December 2009 there should be an hourly, RE, through service. Goods trains ply the line, especially to and from the BMW factory in Dingolfing.
- On the single-tracked, unelectrified northern railway to Bayerisch Eisenstein run the railbuses of the Waldbahn, which are operated by the Regentalbahn under contract to DB Regio Baveria.

Regionalbahn trains run hourly to Regensburg and Zwiesel. There is an alternating two-hourly service between the two Regionalbahn routes: Passau–Plattling und Plattling–Munich, and a Regional-Express through train, Passau–Plattling–Munich, so that an hourly service is achieved here too. This should be further improved in December 2009 to an hourly RE through train.
