= Ingolstadt–Neuoffingen railway =

Railway line in Bavaria, Germany

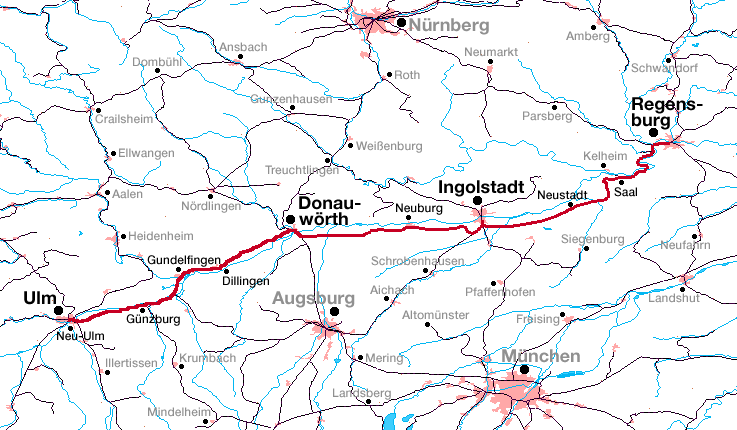

Overview
- Status: Operational
- Owner: Deutsche Bahn
- Line number: 5381
- Locale: Bavaria
- Termini: Ingolstadt Hbf; Neuoffingen

Service
- Type: Heavy rail, passenger/freight rail Regional rail
- Route number: 993
- Operator(s): DB Netz
- Rolling stock: Alstom Coradia Continental

History
- Opened: 1874

Technical
- Line length: 171.4 km (106.5 mi)
- Number of tracks: Single track
- Track gauge: 1,435 mm (4 ft 8 1/2 in) standard gauge
- Minimum radius: 334 metres (1,096 ft)
- Electrification: 15 kV/16.7 Hz AC overhead catenary
- Operating speed: 140 km/h (87 mph)

The Ingolstadt–Neuoffingen railway is a single-track, electrified mainline railway in Bavaria, Germany. It runs in the Danube valley from Ingolstadt via Neuburg an der Donau, Donauwörth and Dillingen an der Donau to Neuoffingen, where it joins the Augsburg–Ulm railway. The Ingolstadt–Neuoffingen railway and the Regensburg–Ingolstadt railway together form the Bavarian Danube Valley Railway (Donautalbahn).

== History ==
Thirteen towns along the Danube between Günzburg and Regensburg considered that they had been neglected by the Bavarian state parliament when it came to railways. They therefore founded a railway committee in 1863 and presented it with a memorandum. A deputation travelled to Munich on 20 October 1866 to underline the need for a line to be built by the Royal Bavarian State Railways. As a result the proposal began to progress. A draft proposal was submitted to the Bavarian Landtag (Parliament) on 28 January 1868. The Landtag approved 1.595 million Gulden for the construction of this railway on 29 April 1869. A field inspection took place with the affected farmers for the first time in the spring of 1871. Numerous property negotiations had to be carried out and compensation had to be determined.

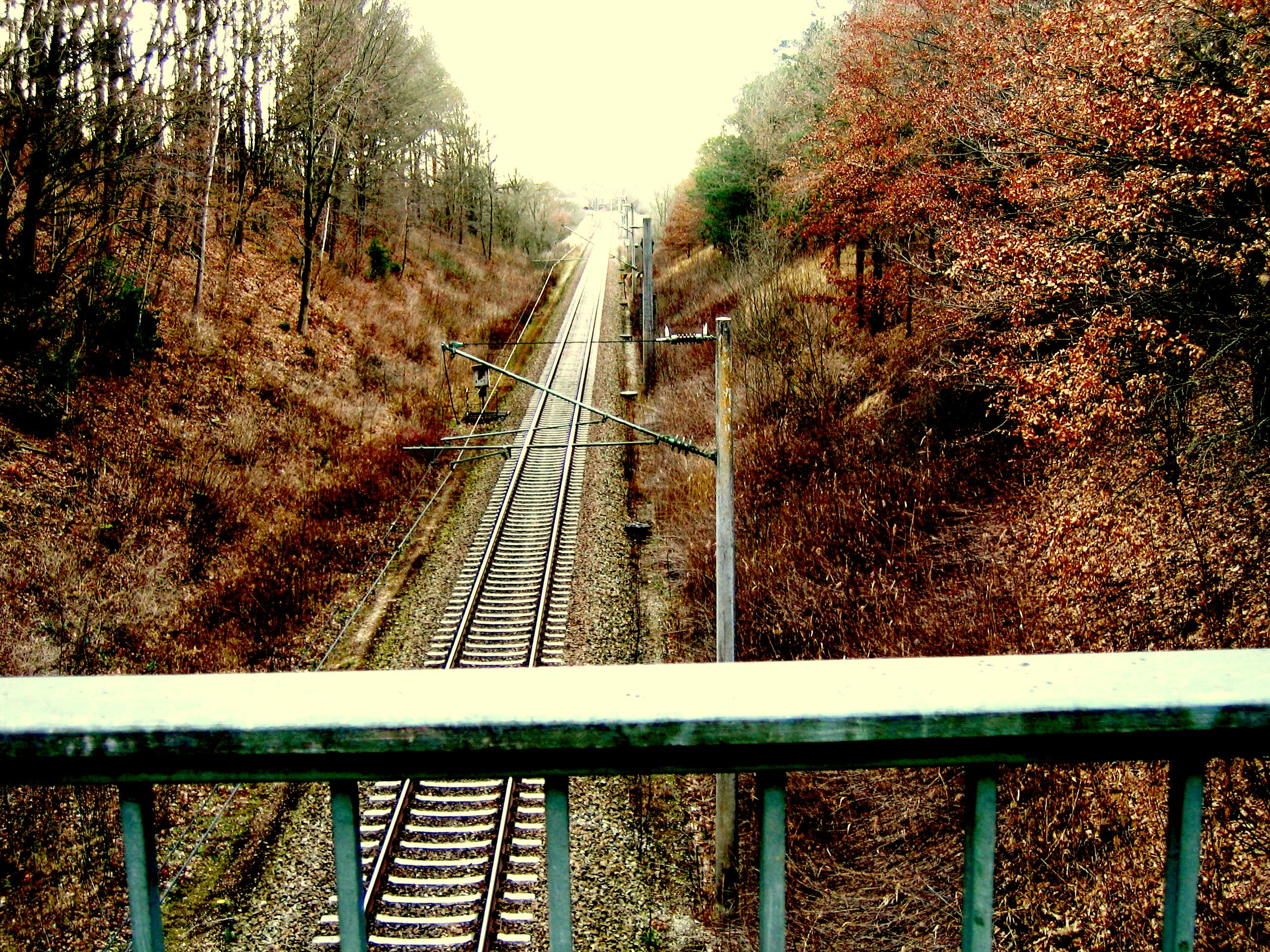
Cutting at Unterhausen station

For a long time it was not clear where the station in Ingolstadt would be built. This delayed the work between Weichering and Ingolstadt.

Another problem was the cutting at Unterhausen, which had a length of 1.3 km and a maximum depth of 17 m. At that time, machines were rare. The excavation had to be done with picks and shovels. The farmers transported around 300,000 cubic metres of humus near Unterhausen and around one million cubic metres of earth in the Neuburg area.

In addition to the construction of the line, water supply was also an important issue. A steam locomotive could not run more than 50 km without taking on water. Therefore, water cranes were established at both Neuburg and Burgheim stations.

Maschinenfabrik Augsburg was responsible for building the crossing over the Lech at Rain, which required a railway bridge for the first time. Very long and high embankments were constructed so that rail operation would not be interrupted even during floods. The embankments caused significant changes to the landscape and cut the terrain into two parts. Numerous railway overpasses became necessary. The bed of the Ach river had to be moved in Weichering.

The townscape in Neuburg was changed. The station was built on the road to Feldkirchen and the rail track cut the road. A new connecting road, including an underpass, were built to re-establish the connection to Feldkirchen.

Railway construction boosted the demand for labour and foreign workers were hired. Some of them were considered dubious. There were repeated brawls and injuries. A police station was therefore established at the Rohrenfeld stud farm and the Neuburg and Burgheim police stations were strengthened.

The construction of a station in Donauwörth was not yet certain, so the line ended in Hamlar. It was not until the end of 1874 that work began on the Hamlar–Donauwörth section and the station was built at its current location.

The first train ran tentatively from Ingolstadt to Neuburg on 20 April 1874 and the first train ran over the Lech Bridge on 28 May 1874. The first official steam train journey ran on the Ingolstadt–Donauwörth route on 15 August 1874.

=== Operations ===
The railway had plans to fuel the steam locomotives with peat. The material was obtained from the nearby Old Bavarian Donaumoos. The area of Weichering station would serve as a loading area. As a result, Weichering station was built with an exceptionally large station area, twelve km from Ingolstadt. The railway company had already signed a contract with the municipality of Obergrasheim for the purchase of 500,000 cubic metres of peat to be delivered in 1874. The first deliveries were made between 1 April and 30 June and amounted to 141,000 cubic metres. The dry pieces of peat could be a maximum of 25 cm long and 8 cm wide. However, the peat had too low a calorific value and therefore did not provide the locomotives with the required power. So this contract had to be cancelled.

The company eventually switched from steam to diesel operation. The construction of the Bertoldsheim power station in 1967 allowed the electrification of the line. The 97.5 km-long Ingolstadt–Neuoffingen section was electrified on 5 May 1980 and electric operations were officially inaugurated on 24 May 1980.

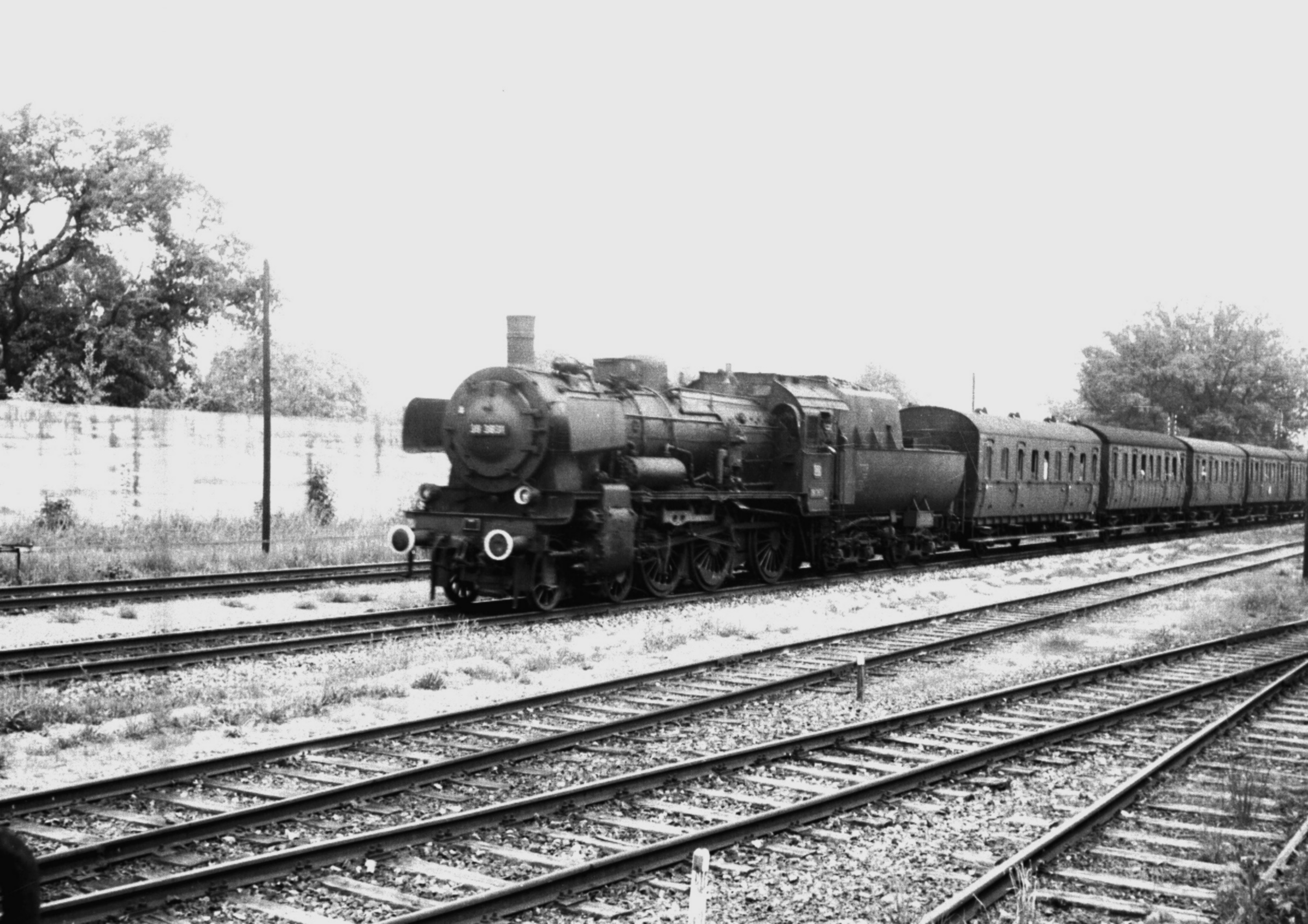
A passenger train in Rohrenfeld station

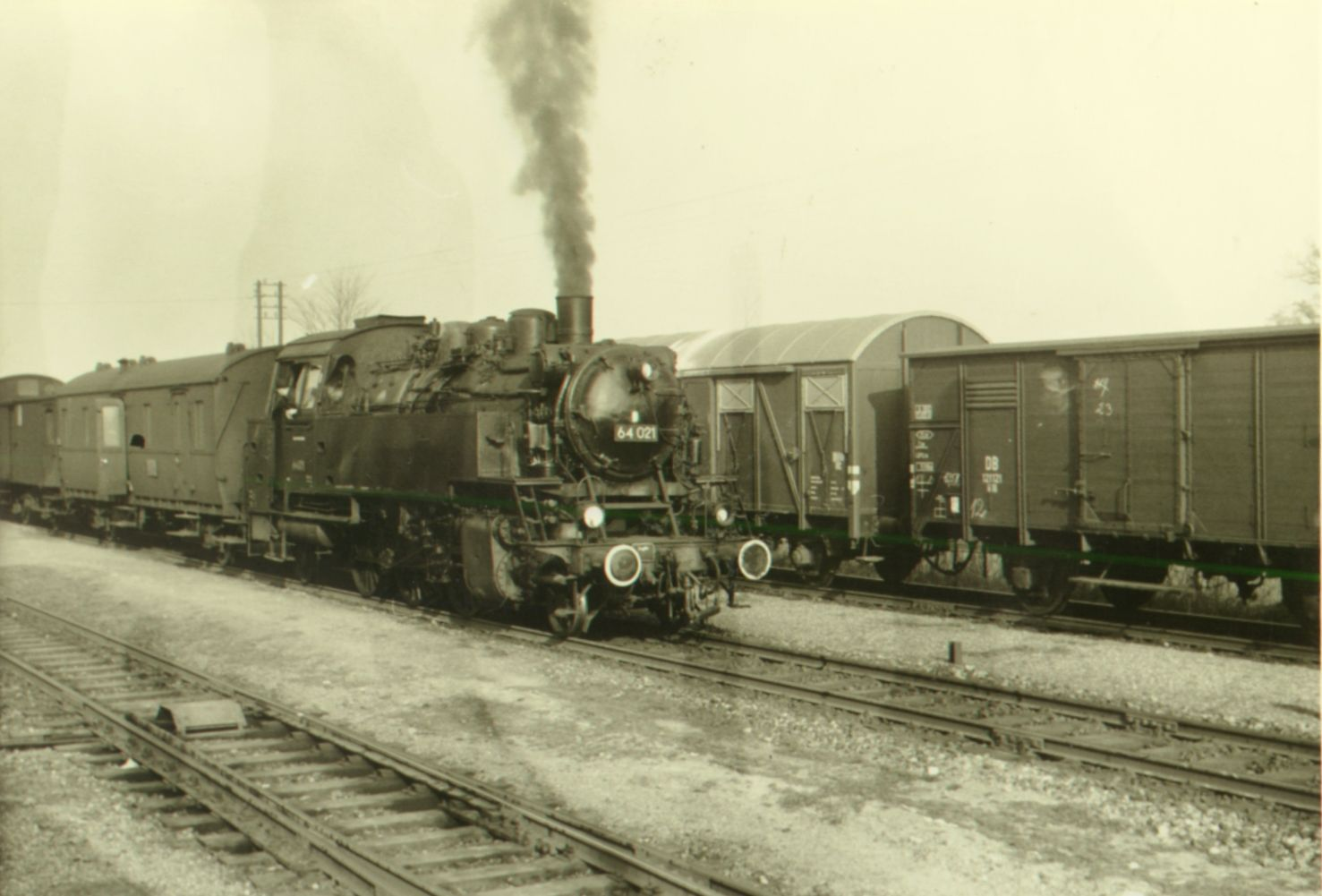
Passenger and freight trains cross in Rohrenfeld

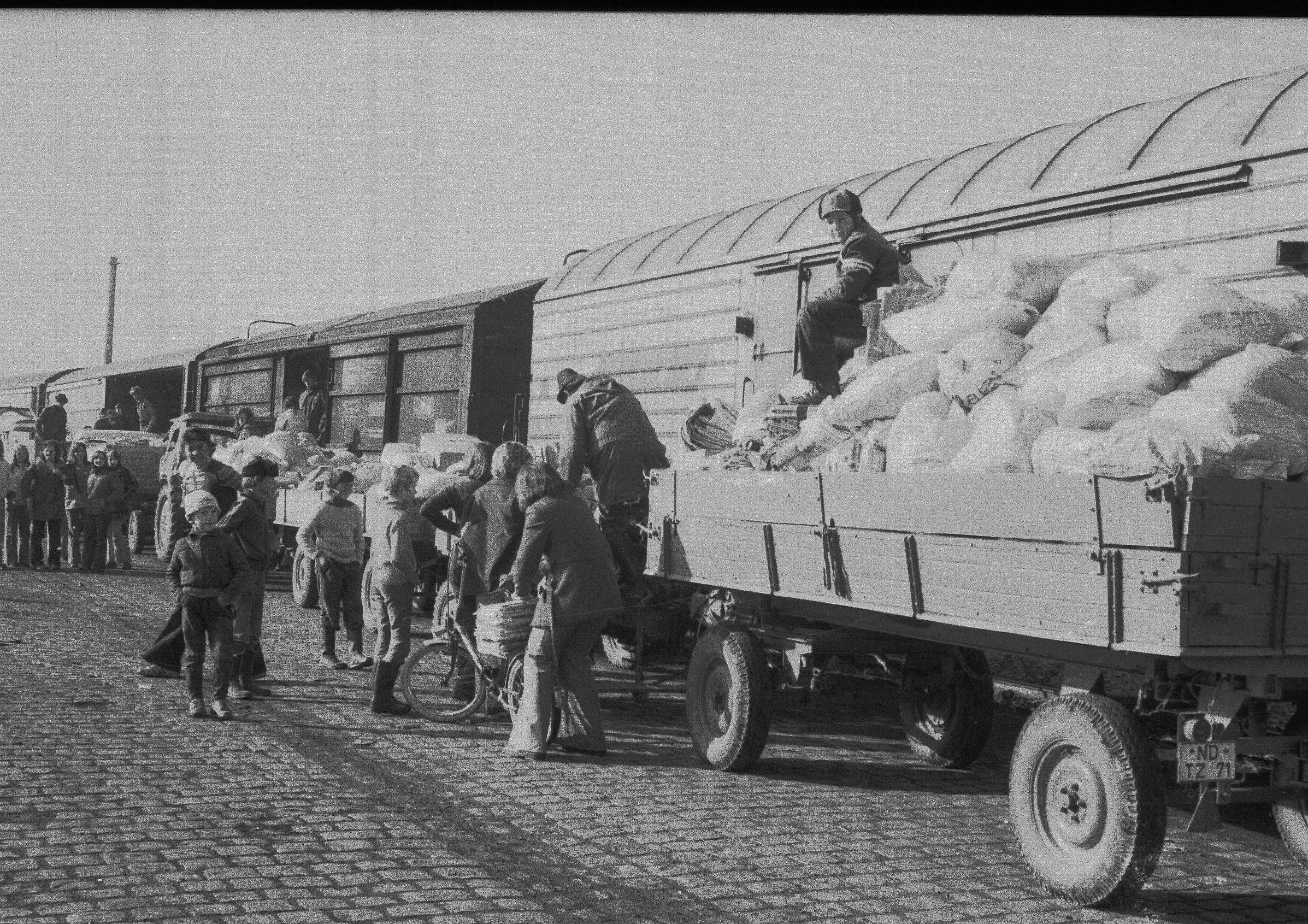
Potato loading

The line between Ingolstadt Hauptbahnhof and Weichering station was completely rerouted from 1990 to 1995. The line previously ran north out of the station and ran in a loop across the city, but the line now runs south from Ingolstadt. The line initially runs with one track on each side of the Ingolstadt–Munich railway. The Ingolstadt–Neuoffingen services run regularly on the eastern track in both directions. The western track is mainly used by trains on the Ingolstadt–Augsburg railway, which runs together with the Ingolstadt–Neuoffingen railway to Seehof operations station. Seehof station has two tracks and various transfer options between the two lines. After leaving Seehof, the Ingolstadt–Augsburg railway branches off and the line now continues as a single track to Weichering station, where it returns to the original route from the entry signal. The old line has been completely dismantled up to that point. On 29 May 1995, a regional train running from Ingolstadt via Weichering to Donauwörth was the first train to use the new route.

The carriage of freight between Ingolstadt and Donauwörth was discontinued on 15 December 2002.

After the takeover of the transport services by agilis and an expansion of the train service, the train crossings that used to take place almost exclusively in Unterhausen only occur there on weekends. Under the current timetable, train crossings now take place every two hours in Unterhausen and every two hours in Neuburg. There are three pairs of express trains between Ulm and Regensburg on weekdays, which do not serve all stops. Due to these additional journeys, the stations of Rain, Burgheim and Weichering are also used for scheduled train crossings. Unterhausen station is also important as a connecting point for the private freight wagon repair shop there, mainly for tank wagons. The braking distance between Weichering and Rain is reduced to 700 m, otherwise it is 1000 m. The top speed is 140 km/h.

Since the timetable change on 13 December 2015 the Agilis trains have also been arriving in Ingolstadt Nord from both directions (Donauwörth and Regensburg) from Monday to Friday in order to improve connections to the Audi plant. There are some express trains that are not busy.

Platform 3 in Weichering station, which was dismantled in 2003, was reinstalled in 2016. This allowed freight traffic to be handled outside the Ingolstadt node. Due to the passenger level crossings to platform 1 that have existed in both Weichering and Rohrenfeld stations, crossings with freight trains has always been a cause of delay for the Agilis local trains. The reconstruction of these stations needs to take into account the increasing freight traffic. The first work on clearing the old track bed and the first survey work were carried out at Weichering station in the autumn of 2012.

A new, modern and disabled-friendly platform was put into operation in Schwenningen at the timetable change on 10 December 2006. Previously, Schwenningen had a split platform that was divided by the level crossing of the connecting road to Wolpertstetten. Due to the crossing signalling, trains had to stop behind the level crossing. After the modernisation of the crossing and platform, this is no longer necessary, so that a simple platform on the eastern side of the road is now sufficient.

On the Ingolstadt–Neuoffingen section, Agilis operates through regional trains to/from Regensburg, usually every hour to Günzburg. The service to Ulm usually runs hourly, using Alstom Coradia Continental multiple units.

The passenger trains are scheduled to cross in Dillingen between Donauwörth and Günzburg. The braking distance is largely 1000 m, with the exception of the Dillingen–Höchstädt section running towards Donauwörth, where the braking distance is only 700 m. The top speed is 140 km/h.

To improve traffic control and to minimise delays after operational disruptions, a new outer platform was built at platform 2 at Blindheim (traditionally known in English as Blenheim) station after a long planning phase. Access takes place directly at the level crossing of the connecting road between Blindheim and Unterglauheim, The length of the platform is 140 m and the platform height is 55 cm. The platform itself was put into operation at the timetable change of December 2012, but the reconstruction of the surroundings had not yet been completed. Platform 1, which was previously used at the old station building, was to be replaced by a new platform next to platform 2, which was also new. The community of Blindheim would have liked to have a bike&ride facility after the actual work on the construction of the platform has been completed, with. in addition to parking spaces, a bus stop for better connections with public transport. The platform on track 2 previously used will no longer be available once the construction work has been completed. As of 2012, it was not known whether the entrance building in Blindheim, which was in very poor condition, would be preserved and modernised.

The access points to the side ramp were upgraded when platform 1 in Blindheim was rebuilt in the spring of 2012. There has not been a freight customer in Blindheim for a long time.

Construction of a second platform in Tapfheim on track 2 had not started as of November 2012. The municipality of Tapfheim wanted to provide preliminary support for the project. DB Station&Service had already agreed to build the second platform at Tapfheim, provided that a necessary underpass was built by the federal government and the Free State of Bavaria.

In contrast, the overpass that had been planned for more than 10 years was built between Tapfheim and Schwenningen in the summer 2012. In the Tapfheim area, a new overpass on "Am Wackerberg" was built over the railway line. The former level crossings at "Dettenhardter Straße" and "Brachstädter Straße" were closed. Several collisions between rail and road vehicles had occurred at both level crossings, several involving fatalities.
