= Neukirchen–Weiden railway =

Railway line in Germany

Overview
- Line number: 5060
- Locale: Bavaria, Germany

Service
- Route number: 870

Technical
- Line length: 51.5 km (32.0 mi)
- Track gauge: 1,435 mm (4 ft 8 1/2 in) standard gauge
- Operating speed: 140 km/h (87 mph)
Route map
- Source: German railway atlas

The Neukirchen–Weiden railway is a 51-kilometre-long main line in Bavaria, Germany. It branches off the Nuremberg–Schwandorf railway at Neukirchen bei Sulzbach-Rosenberg station and runs via Vilseck to Weiden in der Oberpfalz.

== History ==
The impetus for the construction of the line was a memorandum of 20 July 1869 from the Nuremberg Railway Committee to the Bavarian Eastern Railway Company (Bayerischen Ostbahnen). It argued that this route would be the shortest and most economical connection between Nuremberg and Weiden and that the line would also be important for freight traffic to and from Bohemia and central Germany.

Construction began in December 1873 after the route planning was completed in August 1872. The rails were supplied by Hammerwerk Hellziechen. The line was officially opened on 15 October 1875.

In 1973, the line, which had been built to branch line standards, was upgraded with extensive work to main line standards.

== Route description ==
The line branches off the Nuremberg–Schwandorf line after Neukirchen station and runs east to the intersection with the B 85 and then turns to the north, running through several curves. After the village of Schönlind, the line crosses the Vils and runs parallel with it to Vilseck.

After Vilseck station, the line turns east in front of the deserted village of Langenbruck and runs past the southern edge of the Grafenwoehr Training Area through the Etzenricht forest to Weiherhammer. After Weiherhammer, the line crosses the Haidenaab and runs next to it to Etzenricht. The line then turns to the left, connects with the Regensburg–Weiden railway at Ullersricht and runs with it to Weiden station.

=== Line standards ===
The entire length of the line is single-track, equipped for tilting technology and not electrified. The maximum line speed is 140 km/h. In February 2017, the line class on a section between Großalbershof and Vilseck was reduced from D4 to A and the speed limit reduced to 110 km/h.

=== Transport association ===
The Neukirchen–Thansüß section is integrated into the Verkehrsverbund Großraum Nürnberg (Nuremberg Region Transport Association) as Regionalbahn service R41.

== Trains ==
The Regional-Express service on the Nuremberg–Neukirchen–Weiden–Neustadt (Waldnaab)/Schwandorf(–Regensburg) route are operated by class 612 (Regioswinger) diesel railcars. These trains are coupled/split in Neukirchen (b. Sulzbach-Rosenberg) station.
