= Regensburg–Ingolstadt railway =

Railway line in Bavaria, Germany

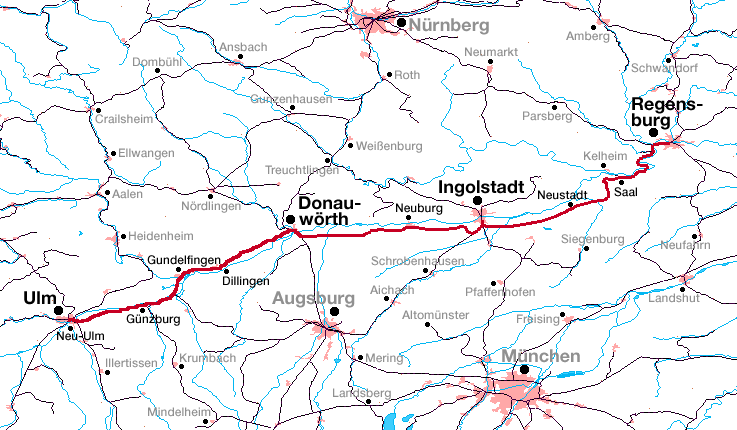

Overview
- Status: Operational
- Owner: Deutsche Bahn
- Line number: 5851
- Locale: Bavaria
- Termini: Regensburg; Ingolstadt

Service
- Type: Heavy rail, passenger/freight rail Regional rail
- Route number: 993
- Operator(s): DB Netz
- Rolling stock: Alstom Coradia Continental

History
- Opened: 1874

Technical
- Line length: 73.913 km (45.927 mi)
- Number of tracks: Single track
- Track gauge: 1,435 mm (4 ft 8 1/2 in) standard gauge
- Minimum radius: 430 metres (1,410 ft)
- Electrification: 15 kV/16.7 Hz AC overhead catenary
- Operating speed: 140 km/h (87 mph)

The Regensburg–Ingolstadt railway is a single-track, electrified mainline railway in Bavaria, Germany. It runs in the Danube valley from Regensburg to Ingolstadt. The Regensburg–Ingolstadt railway and the Ingolstadt–Neuoffingen railway together form the Bavarian Danube Valley Railway (Donautalbahn).

== History ==
The construction of the Regensburg–Ingolstadt railway was originally carried out primarily for military reasons (for instance, providing a connection to the Landesfestung Ingolstadt—Ingolstadt state fortress). Its construction was authorised by a law passed on 29 April 1869 and the official opening took place on 1 June 1874.

The precise route was initially contested. The towns of Kelheim and Abensberg both wanted a direct railway link. The Kelheim option would have involved the construction of an expensive tunnel; as a result of which Abensberg eventually won the day. As compensation a 5.5 km long stub line was built between Saal and Kelheim, that was ceremoniously opened on 15 February 1875. Passenger services on this branch were withdrawn in 1986.

The line between Regensburg and Ingolstadt is 73.4 km long and mostly single-tracked, although the trackbed was prepared for two tracks. Between the stations of Sinzing and Gundelshausen an (initially provisional) passing loop was built at the start of the Second World War at the village of Matting.

Shortly before the end of the war in 1945 the two bridges over the Danube at Sinzing and Poikam were blown by the Wehrmacht. They quickly underwent makeshift repairs, however, and as early as August of the same year the entire route was usable again.

The decision to make the region around Ingolstadt a centre for the German petrochemical industry was the main factor in giving the railway a renewed importance. The track, ballast and signalling were replaced, as was the Sinzing Bridge, and several sections of the Poikam Bridge were renovated. On 29 September 1978 the line was electrified.

In addition to the above-mentioned branch line between Saal and Kelheim there were several other spurs, including:

- the Laaber Valley Railway between Sinzing and Alling (opened on 20 December 1875, closed on 31 December 1985), 4.2 km long
- a branch line from Saal to Kelheim (length 4.6 km), a section of which is still used as a siding to an industrial estate and the port.
- a narrow gauge spur between Abensberg station and the quarry at Offenstetten.

The line continuously follows the course of the Danube and crosses it five times between Regensburg and Ulm. The Danube bridges at Sinzing and in Donauwörth are the most imposing structures along the line.

The passenger halt at Sinzing station was closed in December 2005 following the construction of a new halt, more central to the town, just a few metres from the southern approach to the station on the open line.

Until 11 December 2010, passenger traffic on the line was operated by Deutsche Bahn. Push–pull trains, usually including three converted Silberling coaches were operated. The Class 111 locomotives in charge were invariably at the western, i.e. the Ingolstadt, end of the train.

== Current operations ==
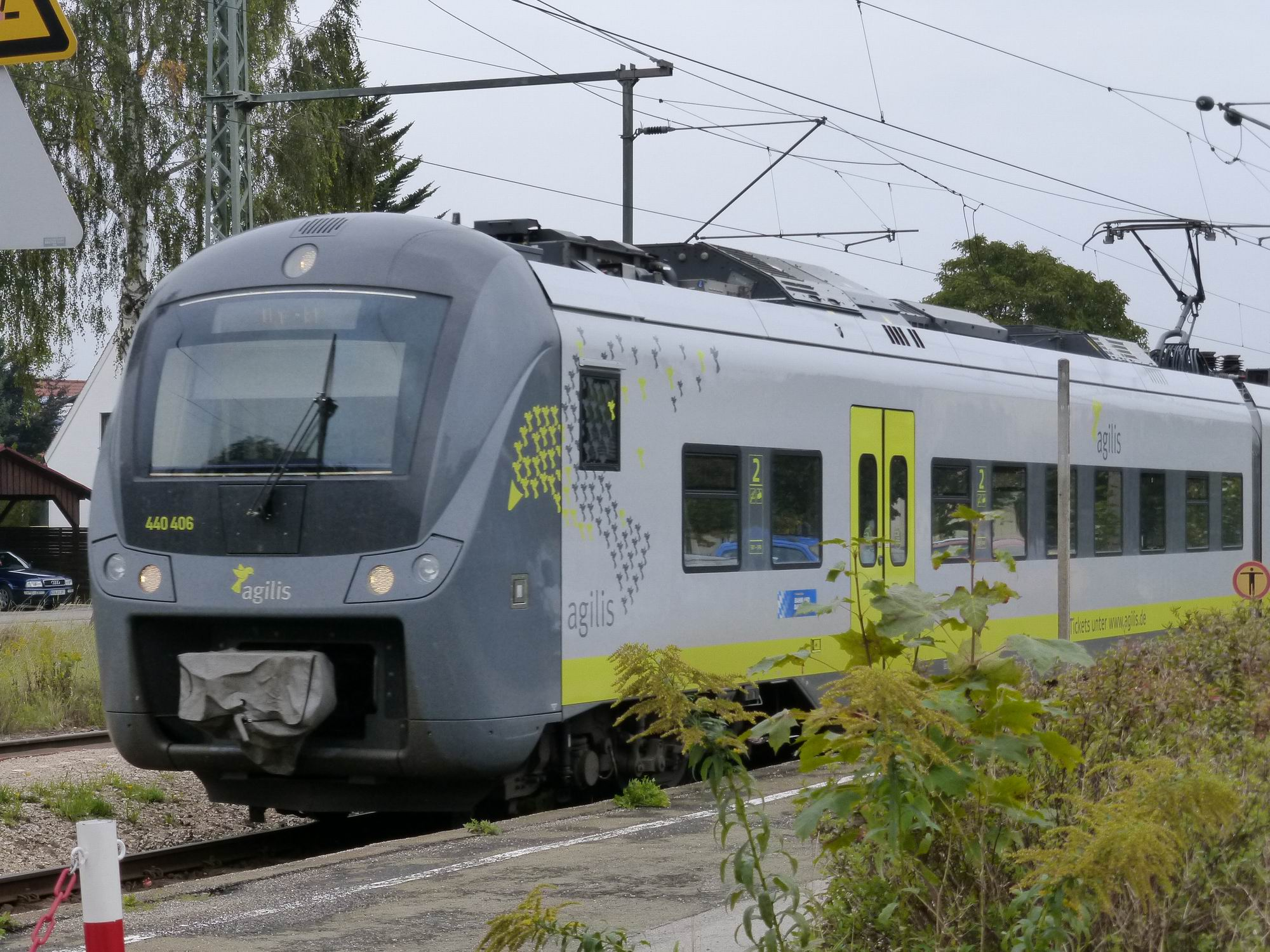
Alstom Coradia Continental of Agilis at the entrance to Abensberg station

The entire line is single-tracked and electrified as far as Günzburg and is classed as a main line. The braking distance for the Regensburg-Ingolstadt section is 1000 m throughout and the speed limit is 120 km/h.

The whole line from Regensburg to Ulm is part of the Regensburg Star network (Regensburger Stern) announced in April 2007, the franchise for which was won by the railway operator, BeNEX, in December 2007. The aim of the competition was an expansion and modernisation of local public transport services on the lines radiating from Regensburg to Landshut, Neumarkt and Plattling as well as the Danube Valley Railway itself. The trains are Alstom Coradia Continental trains run by Agilis. There are up to 20 percent more train journeys than before. Additional trains operate, especially during peak hour, in the evenings and on weekends. Since 11 December 2011 there have also been special Agilis express trains on the Danube Valley Railway that connect the three major cities of Regensburg, Ingolstadt and Ulm. Since these express trains no longer stop at every station, they only need about two and a half hours to travel from Regensburg to Ulm and are therefore around an hour faster than the normal trains with a total of 32 stops and a journey time of around three and a half hours.

The Danube Valley Railway is also especially important for goods traffic, especially with regard to the oil refineries at Ingolstadt, Vohburg, Münchsmünster and Neustadt an der Donau. The line is also very important for the Audi factory in Ingolstadt and the Danube ports in Kelheim and Regensburg.
