= Regensburg Hauptbahnhof =

Railway station in Regensburg, Germany

Regensburg Hbf
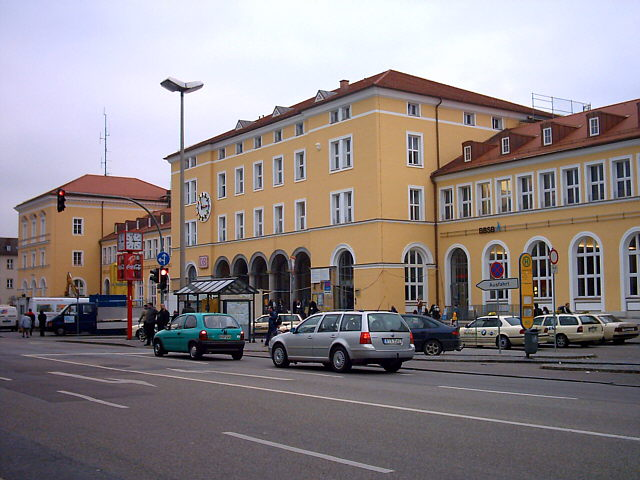
- Entrance of the station

General information
- Location: Regensburg, Bavaria; Germany
- Coordinates: 49°0′44″N 12°5′58″E
- Owner: Deutsche Bahn
- Operator: DB InfraGO
- Lines: Munich–Regensburg (KBS 930); Nuremberg–Regensburg (KBS 880); Regensburg–Passau (KBS 880); Regensburg–Weiden (KBS 855); Regensburg–Ingolstadt (KBS 993)
- Platforms: 8

Construction
- Accessible: Yes
- Architectural style: Neo-Renaissance

Other information
- Station code: 5169
- DS100 code: NRH
- Category: 2
- Fare zone: RVV: 1
- Website: www.bahnhof.de; BEG-Stationssteckbrief

History
- Opened: 1892; 134 years ago
- Electrified: 15 May 1927; 99 years ago

Services
Preceding station	DB Fernverkehr	Following station
Nürnberg Hbf towards Hamburg-Altona	ICE 1 Sprinter	Plattling towards Passau Hbf
Nürnberg Hbf towards Hamburg-Altona, Berlin-Gesundbrunnen or Dortmund Hbf	ICE 91	Plattling towards Wien Hbf
Preceding station	ÖBB	Following station
Nürnberg Hbf towards Amsterdam Centraal or Hamburg-Altona	Nightjet	Passau Hbf towards Wien Hbf
Preceding station	DB Regio Bayern	Following station
Eggmühl towards München Hbf	RE 2	Schwandorf towards Hof Hbf
Regenstauf towards Nürnberg Hbf	RE 40	Terminus
Regenstauf towards Nürnberg Hbf	RE 43	Terminus
Eggmühl towards München Hbf	RE 50	Beratzhausen towards Nürnberg Hbf
Preceding station	Agilis / DB Regio Bayern	Following station
Obertraubling towards Munich Airport	RE 22	Beratzhausen towards Nürnberg Hbf
Preceding station		Following station
Neufahrn (Niederbay) towards München Hbf	RE 23	Schwandorf towards Hof Hbf
Neufahrn (Niederbay) towards München Hbf	RE 25	Schwandorf towards Praha hl.n.
Preceding station		Following station
Terminus	RB 23	Regenstauf towards Marktredwitz or Neustadt (Waldnaab)
Preceding station		Following station
Regensburg-Prüfening towards Ingolstadt Hbf	RE 18	Terminus
Parsberg towards Nürnberg Hbf	RE 50	Regensburg-Burgweinting towards Plattling
Regensburg-Prüfening towards Ingolstadt Nord	RB 17	Regensburg-Burgweinting towards Plattling
Regensburg-Prüfening towards Neumarkt (Oberpfalz)	RB 51	Regensburg-Burgweinting towards Plattling
Location

Regensburg Hauptbahnhof is the main railway station in the city of Regensburg in southern Germany.

== Location ==
Regensburg Hauptbahnhof is located on the southern edge of the old city (Altstadt) in the immediate vicinity of Schloss St. Emmeram. In front of the station building are a taxi rank and the regional bus station. A short distance away is the central public transport hub known as Bustreff Albertstraße. The station has numerous shops; since its renovation in 2004 the overbridge also enables access to the Regensburg Arcade shopping centre south of the station tracks. At the site there are 177 car parking bays and stands for 300 bicycles.

== History ==
Regensburg was connected to the railway network relatively late; although the first line in Bavaria opened in 1835, it took until 1859 for the Bavarian Eastern Railway (Königlich privilegirte Aktiengesellschaft der bayerischen Ostbahnen) to link this east Bavarian metropolis with Nuremberg and Munich, the first line to be built going via Amberg. In 1860 Regensburg was connected to Passau; in 1873 a direct line to Nuremberg was opened; and this was followed by a connection to Ingolstadt in 1874.

The first station building was built between 1859 and 1864 at the southern end of Maximilianstraße to plans by architect Heinrich von Hügel, its great length, twin towers and five-arched portal reflecting the influence of the Italian renaissance. The building was torn down in 1888 and replaced by a new building in the contemporary style of the Gründerzeit. This second station building was destroyed in World War II; its successor was finished in 1955 and renovated in 2004.

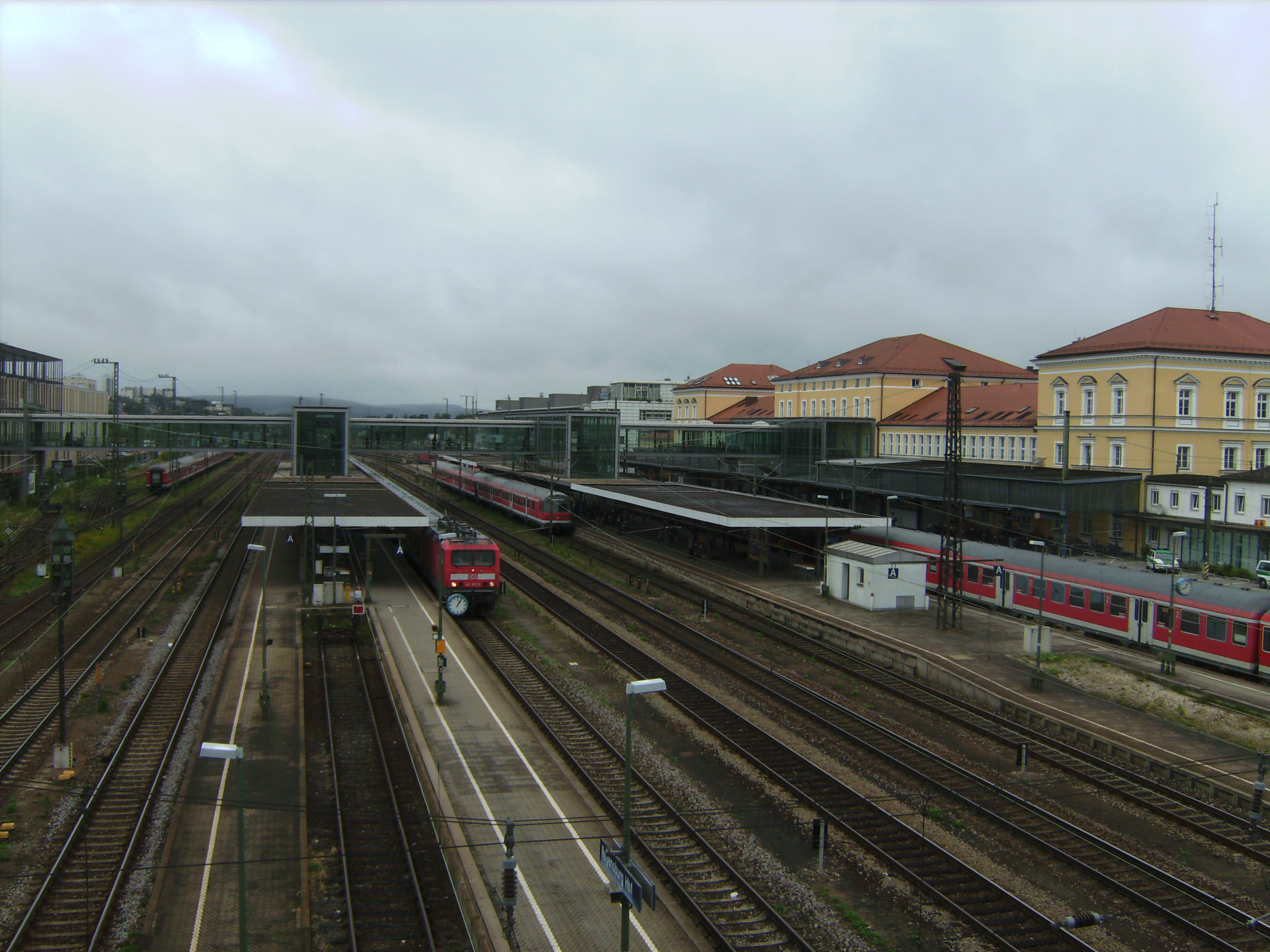
View over the platforms and tracks

After just under five years of construction, a new signal box went into service at the Hauptbahnhof in spring 1988. At a cost of 24 million DM it replaced eight old signal boxes that had been repaired at the end of the Second World War. Plans for the replacement began in 1981. 180 sets of points and 220 signals in the marshalling yard and main station are controlled by the new box; the 9-metre-long control panel was designed for an expansion of the area to be controlled. For the first time in the history of the Deutsche Bundesbahn, time signals were no longer controlled by cable but by long wave transmissions from the Mainflingen transmitter.

The marshalling yard, which is west of the main passenger station and adjacent to it, has been closed and is to be demolished.

== Operational usage ==
Regensburg is situated at the crossing of the main line railway lines Munich-Hof and Nuremberg-Passau; smaller branch lines connect Regensburg to Ulm and Prague.

Regensburg today sees about 200 trains per day, most of them operated by Deutsche Bahn, though some regional services are operated by Vogtlandbahn. In the 2026 timetable, the following services stop at the station:

Train type	Route	Frequency (mins)
ICE 1	Hamburg-Altona – Hamburg – Essen – Duisburg – Düsseldorf – Cologne – Bonn – Koblenz – Mainz – Frankfurt Airport – Frankfurt – Würzburg – Nuremberg – Regensburg – Passau	Once a day
ICE 91	Vienna – Regensburg – Nuremberg – Würzburg – Hamburg-Altona / Rostock	120
RE 2	Munich – Regensburg – Schwandorf – Hof	120
RE 50	Munich – Regensburg – Nuremberg	120
RE 18	Ulm – Donauwörth – Günzburg – Ingolstadt – Regensburg	Sat, Sun and public hols: 120
RE 22	Regensburg – Munich Airport	60
RE 23	Regensburg – Schwandorf – Marktredwitz	Some trains
RE 25	Munich – Freising – Landshut – Regensburg – Schwandorf – Furth im Wald – Prague	120
RE 40	Regensburg – Schwandorf – Amberg – Nuremberg	120
RE 50	Munich – Freising – Landshut – Regensburg – Neumarkt in der Oberpfalz – Nuremberg	120
RB 15	Regensburg − Ingolstadt − Donauwörth − Günzburg − Ulm	60; Sat, Sun and public hols: 120
RB 17	(Ingolstadt Nord –) Ingolstadt Hbf – Regensburg (– Straubing – Plattling)	Mon–Fri: 60 or 120
RB 23	Regensburg – Schwandorf – Weiden – Marktredwitz	60
RB 51	Neumarkt − Regensburg − Plattling	60

The platform announcements which inform travellers of the arrival and departure of trains at Regensburg Hauptbahnhof and also welcome alighting passengers were digitalised in July 2008.

== See also ==
- Rail transport in Germany
- Railway stations in Germany
