= Regensberg (disambiguation) =

Regensberg is a municipality in the district of Dielsdorf in the canton of Zurich in Switzerland.

This is not to be confused with similarly named Regensburg, a German city in Bavaria.

Regensberg may also refer to:

- Regensberg Castle, sometimes referred to Neu-Regensberg, a hill castle in Switzerland built about the mid-13th century
- Alt-Regensberg Castle, also referred to Altburg, a hill castle which was built about the mid-11th century AD
- Regensberg family, a family of counts from the Canton of Zürich in Switzerland

== See also ==
- Regensburg (disambiguation)
