= Saal–Kelheim railway =

Former railway line in Germany

Saal an der Donau–Kelheim
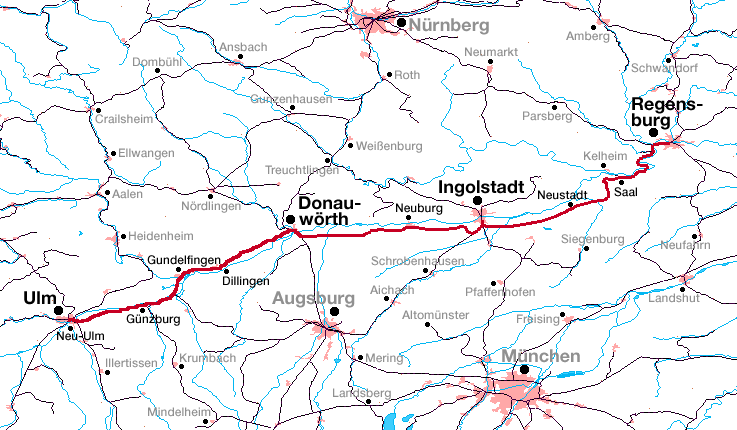

Overview
- Line number: 5853

Service
- Route number: ex 411e (1963), 411n (1944)

Technical
- Line length: 4.6 km (2.9 mi)
- Track gauge: 1,435 mm (4 ft 8 1/2 in)

The Saal–Kelheim railway was a single-tracked branch line in Bavaria in southern Germany.

In planning for the Danube Valley Railway there was disagreement to begin with about the precise route it should take. The towns of Kelheim and Abensberg both wanted to be directly on the railway. The Kelheim option would have involved the construction of an expensive tunnel; as a result, Abensberg eventually won the day. As compensation a 5.5 km long stub line was built between Saal and Kelheim, that was ceremoniously opened on 15 February 1875. From the terminus at Kelheim a spur ran off to the port to a location known in the route description as Kelheim Donauumschlagstelle (Kelheim Danube transhipment point). The halt still listed in the station and route diagrams in 1938 as Affecking had been renamed by the time of the 1944 timetable as Kelheim Ost.

Traffic on the line was heavy at times. In 1944 eight pairs of trains ran daily. In 1963 there were 16 pairs of trains daily – 2nd class railbuses – four of which ran through to and from Regensburg.

Passenger services on this branch were withdrawn on 29 May 1988. Goods traffic continued until 2 January 1997. On 28 February 1998 the line was officially closed.
