= Neumarkt (Oberpfalz) station =

Railway station in Germany

Neumarkt (Oberpfalz)
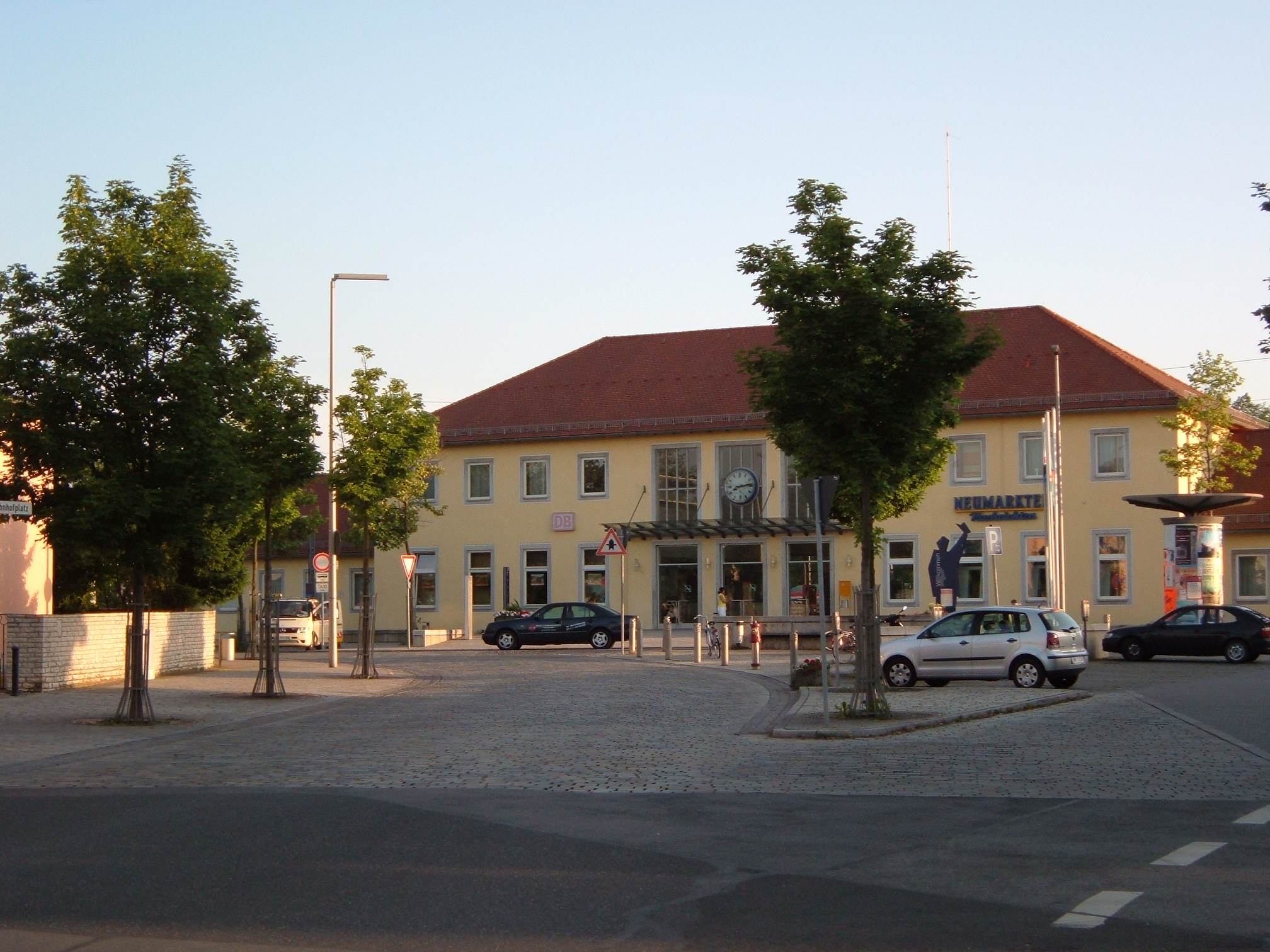
- Station forecourt and main building

General information
- Location: Neumarkt in der Oberpfalz, Bavaria; Germany
- Coordinates: 49°16′24″N 11°27′25″E
- Owner: DB Netz
- Operator: DB Station&Service
- Lines: Nuremberg–Regensburg line (KBS 880); Neumarkt–Dietfurt (Sulztalbahn) (closed)
- Distance: 64.4 km (40.0 mi) from Regensburg Hauptbahnhof
- Platforms: 2 island platforms; 1 side platform
- Tracks: 4
- Train operators: agilis; DB Regio Bayern
- Connections: 460 505 512 513 514 515 516 517 518 521 523 561 562 563 564 565 566 567 568 569 570 573 581 583 587 589

Other information
- Station code: 4416
- DS100 code: NNT
- IBNR: 8004305
- Category: 3
- Fare zone: VGN: 556; RVV: 8A and 8B (VGN transitional tariff)
- Website: bahnhof.de

History
- Opened: 1 December 1871

Services
Preceding station	DB Regio Bayern	Following station
Nürnberg Hbf towards München Hbf	RE 50	Parsberg towards Nürnberg Hbf
Preceding station	Agilis / DB Regio Bayern	Following station
Nürnberg Hbf Terminus	RE 22	Parsberg towards Munich Airport
Preceding station		Following station
Terminus	RB 51	Deining (Oberpf) towards Plattling
Preceding station	Nuremberg S-Bahn	Following station
Pölling towards Nürnberg Hbf	S3	Terminus
Location

Neumarkt (Oberpfalz) station (officially: Neumarkt (Oberpf)) is the oldest and most important railway station in Neumarkt, Germany. It is classified by DB Station&Service as a category 3 station and is also Neumarkt's only long-distance stop. The station is on the Nuremberg–Regensburg line of Deutsche Bahn.

== Location and destinations ==
The station is located south of the Altstadt at the end of Bahnhofstraße. The station building is on the northeast side of the Nuremberg–Regensburg railway. Immediately next to the station building is platform 1, then platforms 2/4 and 5. Beyond that there are several shunting and storage sidings.

South of the station the former Sulztalbahn branches off to Greiselbach. Today it acts as an industrial siding for the firms of Max Bögl at Sengenthal and Pfleiderer AG near the station, as well as being a storage siding for individual trains. Another siding, no longer used, turns off this one to Dehn und Söhne in Hans-Dehn-Straße.

== Transport links ==
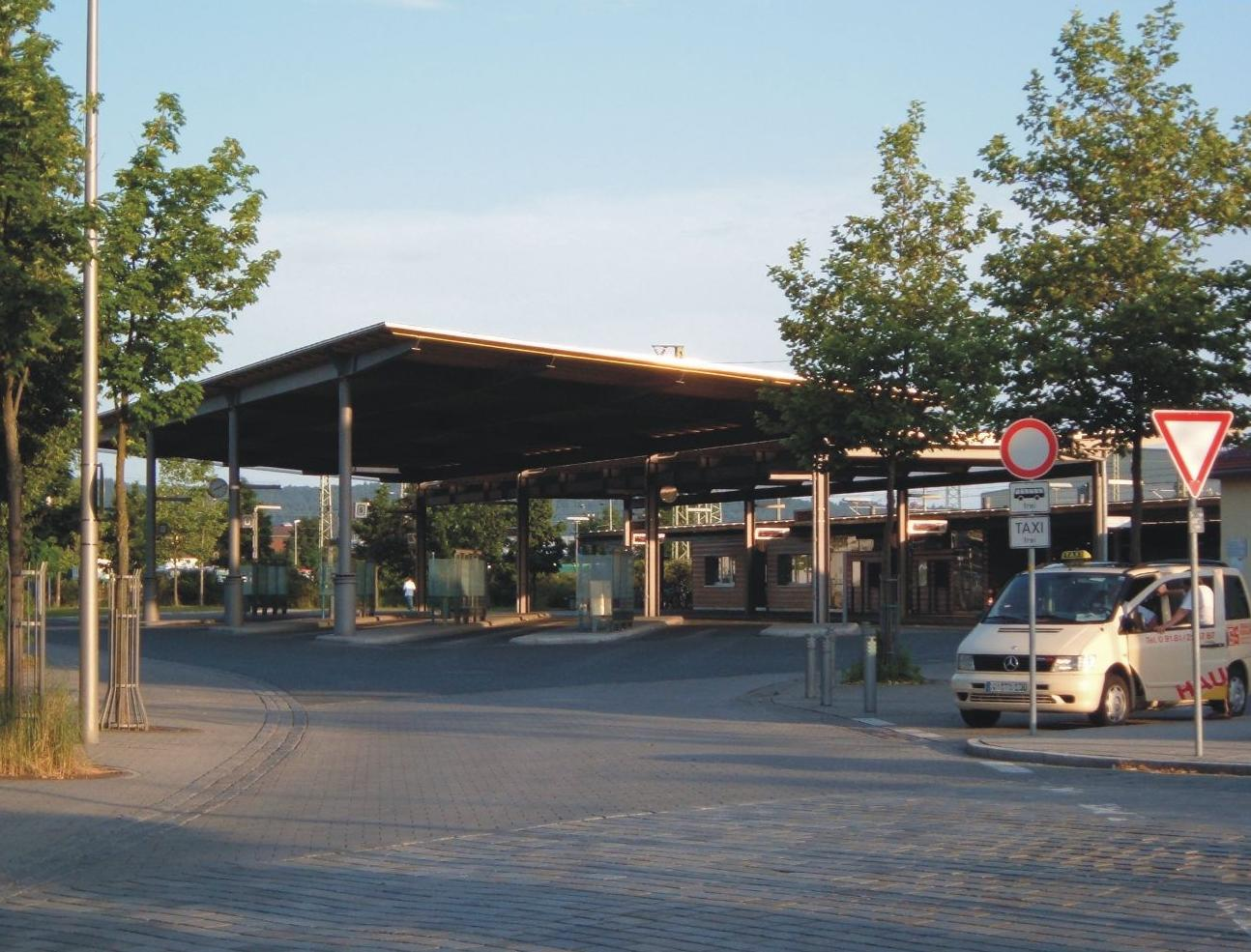
Bus station

Neumarkt station is served at least hourly by Regionalbahn trains to Nuremberg – Erlangen – Lichtenfels and to Regensburg – Plattling. Regional-Express trains to Nuremberg and Munich run every 2 hours. These services form route R5 (Nürnberg – Neumarkt – Parsberg) in the Nuremberg Regional Transport Union (VGN) network. In addition, every morning and evening InterCity trains on the Passau – Karlsruhe and Hamburg – Passau routes also call at the station.

Today there is a bus station on the site of the former goods station, which is served by the Neumarkt town bus company, as well as many Omnibusverkehr Franken (OVF) and Regionalbus Ostbayern (RBO) lines. From here buses can be caught to almost all parts of the town as well as the local county, Landkreis Neumarkt in der Oberpfalz, to Amberg and the stations at Allersberg and Kinding. There is also a taxi rank.

== Service facilities ==
Being a long-distance and regional stop, the station has an extensive range of services. The Deutsche Bahn has a travel centre here; in addition there is a bakery with a café, a kiosk and a newsagents.

All platforms and the bus station are equipped with digital destination boards and an overview board of the current departure times is installed in the station hall. Platforms 1 and 5 are reached by a lift, platforms 2 and 4 have luggage conveyor belts.

There is a public toilet at the bus station. In the immediate vicinity of the station are racks for over 400 bicycles and bays for about 60 cars. About 600 metres away the Parkhaus Ringstraße multi-storey car park rents long-term bays for customers of the VGN and RVV at reasonable rates.

== History ==
The station building was completed by 1 December 1871 when the Nuremberg–Neumarkt line opened. In 1873 the route was extended through to Regensburg. On 1 June 1888 trains began running from here on the Sulztalbahn to Beilngries and Freystadt. In addition to the passenger station, a goods station was also built, where goods from all the local companies were transferred to rail.

On 22 April 1945 the station was almost totally destroyed in an air raid by the United States Army Air Forces. Many men, including refugees on a train in the station, lost their lives.

After the war's end the station was rebuilt and expanded. In addition, in the 1970s, track 3 was removed and the platforms for tracks 2 and 4 built in its place.

After passenger services on the Sulztalbahn ceased on 25 September 1987, the station lost its function as a connecting station in the Altmühl valley. Shortly afterwards the neighbouring goods station was closed.

In 1995 a platform was built for track 5 and was equipped from the outset with a lift for disabled people.

The former goods station was demolished in 1996/1997; in its place the present-day bus station was built. During the construction work, the station building was also fully refurbished and the station square completely relandscaped. On the platforms train destination displays were installed and in the station hall a TrainingPoint for DB trainees established that existed until 2007.

== Plans ==
For the S-Bahn to Nuremberg, due to open in December 2010, in 2008 platforms 1 and 2/4 were refurbished and modernised. Both platforms were raised to a height of 76 cm, the platform roofing was extended. Platforms 2 and 4 are also being equipped with a lift.
