= Sophy Regensburg =

American painter (1885–1974)

Sophy Pollak Regensburg (1885 – April 6, 1974) was an American naïve painter.

Born in New York City, Regensburg was a member of a prominent family; her brother, Walter Pollak, sat on the New York Stock Exchange. She was married to cigar maker Melville E. Regensburg, with whom she had three children, until his death. Active during her marriage as a volunteer, she took up painting in widowhood, when her physician suggested she needed to slow down. She had studied under William Merritt Chase and Robert Henri at the New York School of Art. In 1952, the first year in which she was involved in the hobby, she won a gold medal in the National Amateur Painters Competition. She continued to paint and was able to present her work in thirteen one-woman shows and fifteen group exhibits before her death. Her artwork is characterized mainly by still lifes. The collections of her art was at the American Folk Art Museum, the Miami University Art Museum, and Smith College.
