= Passau Hauptbahnhof =

Main railway station at Passau in Bavaria, Germany

Passau Hbf
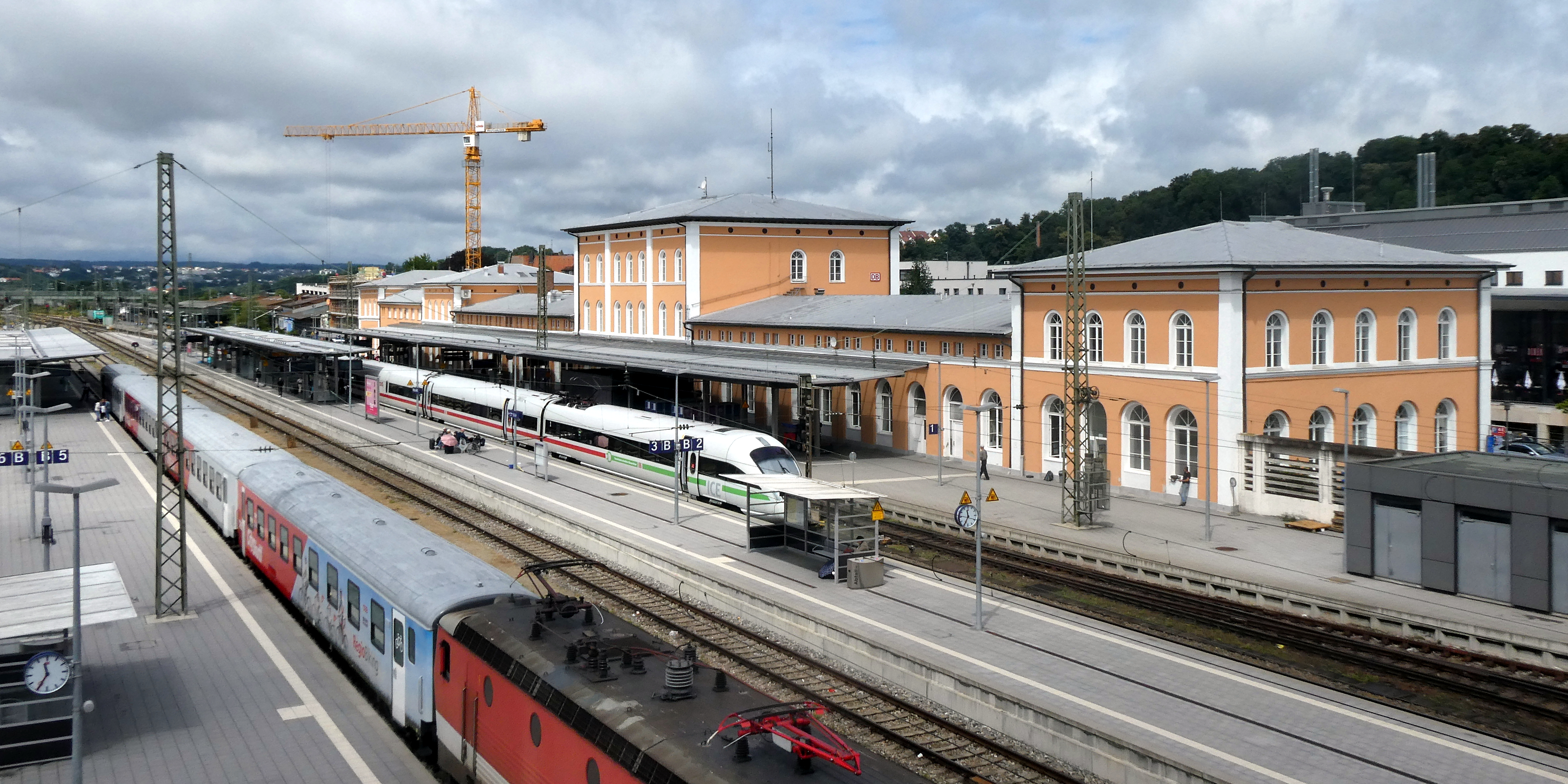
- Platforms and the south side of the main building

General information
- Location: Passau, Bavaria; Germany
- Coordinates: 48°34′26″N 13°27′03″E
- Lines: Regensburg–Passau (KBS 880) (KBS 931); Wels–Passau (KBS 150 (Austria)); Passau-Neumarkt-Sankt Veit (KBS 946); Passau–Freyung (KBS 12888); Passau–Hauzenberg (closed) (KBS 881)
- Platforms: 8

Construction
- Accessible: Yes
- Architectural style: Neo-classical

Other information
- Station code: 4872
- DS100 code: NPA (DB) Pa (ÖBB)
- Category: 3
- Website: www.bahnhof.de

History
- Opened: 1860

Passengers
- ca. 6,500

Services
Preceding station	DB Fernverkehr	Following station
Plattling towards Hamburg-Altona	ICE 1 Sprinter	Terminus
Plattling towards Dortmund Hbf, Berlin Gesundbrunnen or Hamburg-Altona	ICE 91	Wels Hbf towards Wien Hbf
Preceding station	ÖBB	Following station
Regensburg Hbf towards Amsterdam Centraal or Hamburg-Altona	Nightjet	Wels Hbf towards Wien Hbf
Terminus	Regional-Express	Wernstein towards Linz Hbf
Terminus	Regionalzug	Wernstein towards Linz Hbf
Preceding station	DB Regio Bayern	Following station
Vilshofen (Niederbay) towards München Hbf	RE 3	Terminus
Preceding station		Following station
Neustift (b Passau) towards Mühldorf (Oberbay)	RB 46	Terminus
Preceding station		Following station
Vilshofen (Niederbay) towards Nürnberg Hbf	RE 50 summer services Sa+Su	Terminus
Location

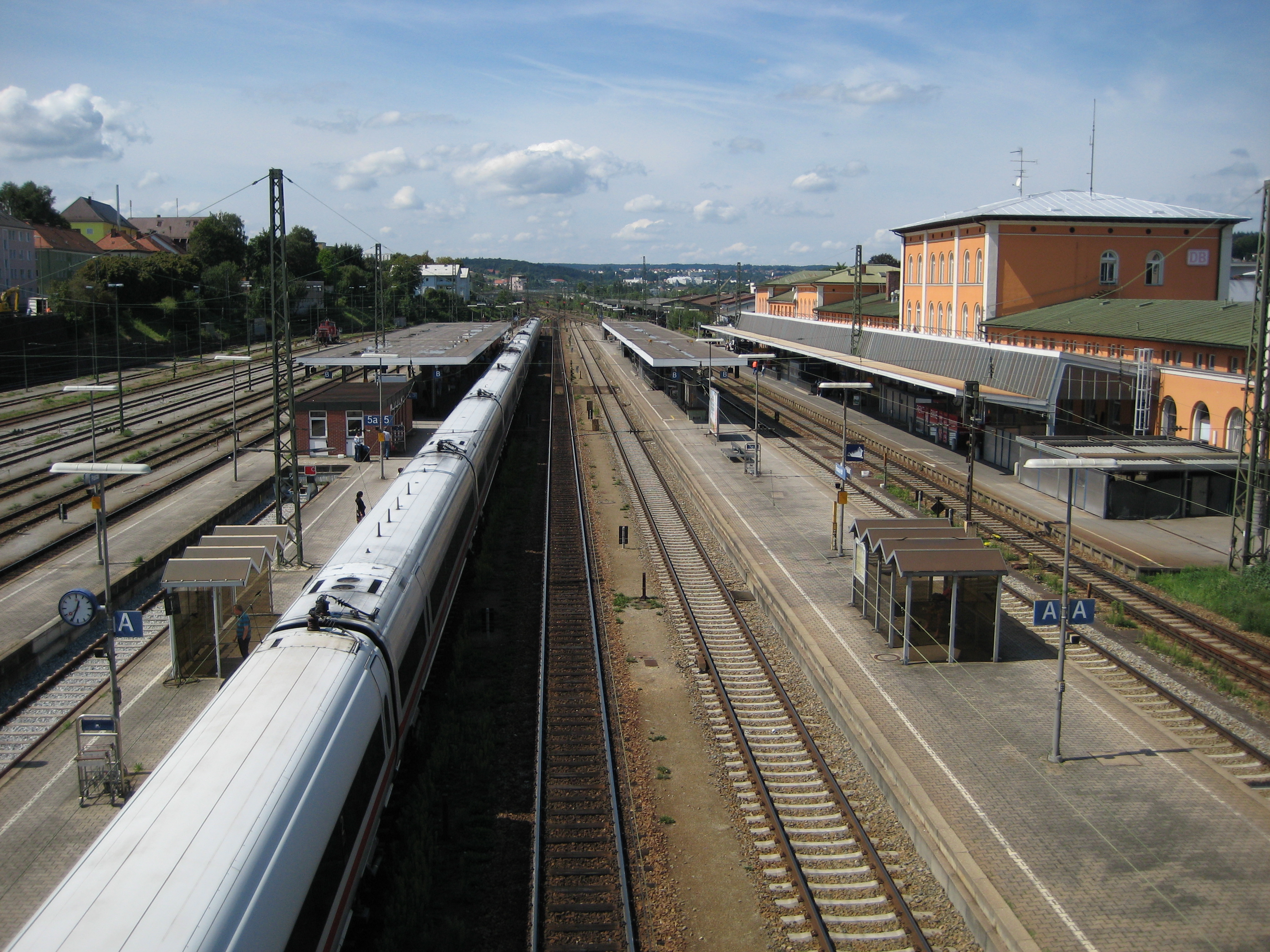
Track layout

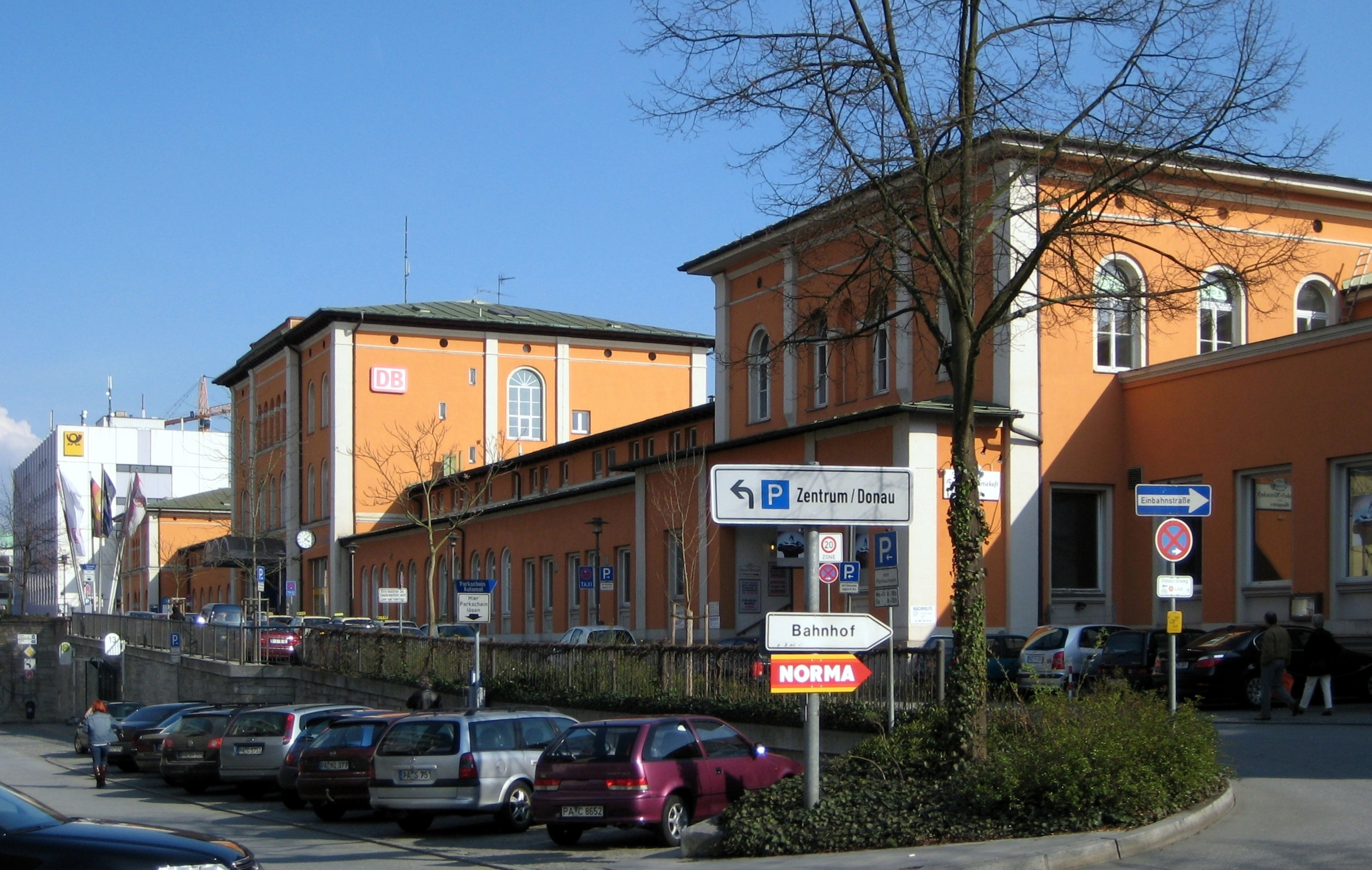
North side and main entrance

Passau Hauptbahnhof is the main railway station at Passau in Bavaria, Germany. Built in 1860, it has eight platforms, of which three are bay platforms and three are through tracks. The ca. 130 m long station building is built in the classic style.

== Present-day services ==
Today the station is a stop for ICE and IC long-distance trains, as well as local trains operated by Deutsche Bahn (DB AG) and the Austrian Federal Railways (ÖBB). From Passau, regional services run to Munich, Regensburg and on the Rottalbahn to Mühldorf am Inn and the Austrian Western Railway to Wels and Linz.

Because Passau was on the trunk route (Magistrale) from Frankfurt am Main via Nuremberg and Linz to Vienna, many long-distance trains transited through it, such as the Ostende to Vienna Express (since the early 20th century) or the TEE Prinz Eugen between Hamburg and Vienna (since the 1960s), which gave its name later to the equivalent IC and then ICE trains.

== Former railway lines ==
From the Hauptbahnhof in Passau, two railway lines branch off that have since been closed. The Ilztalbahn to Waldkirchen and Freyung, with its former branch into the Czech Republic and to Eging am See and Deggendorf, and the line to Hauzenberg with its branch to Obernzell, that ran as far as Wegscheid in former times. These routes, which had not been worked by timetabled services for 25 years, were used until 2002 by the Passauer Eisenbahnfreunde (Passau Railway Society) for special trains, as well as by the goods trains of various companies. After 2002 the routes became impassable due to flood damage. Meanwhile, societies have been formed to support the lines to Freyung and Hauzenberg and they hope to reactivate these routes.

== Former track layout ==
West of the main passenger terminal on the site of the former marshalling yard is a large freight station that serves the cross-border goods traffic between Germany and Austria as well as the cross-loading of goods to ships that ply the river Danube. To the east, the remaining storage sidings and locomotive shed were dismantled in order to create the "new centre of Passau" Neue Mitte Passau.

== Station rebuilding ==
It was planned to convert the station to a barrier-free zone from 2008 to mid-2011 with a subsidy from the Free State of Bavaria of €2M towards the overall cost of €12.5M. The two island platforms as well as the home platform were to have been reached by a lift, and platforms 5 and 6 over the so-called Poststeg ("post office walkway") which would have considerably shortened the distance to the Central Bus Station in the new centre of Passau. In addition the home platform was to have been raised by about 76 cm (30 in) and the underpass widened.

These plans were however changed during the course of 2008, because they would not have coped with the very high number of tourists at the station, especially those using the Danube crossings.

== Joint DB/ÖBB use ==
Since 1951, the station has been used by the ÖBB and DB jointly as an internal station. For that reason there were two separate pedestrian underpasses under the tracks, separated by a wall, that enabled border and customs checks to be carried out. Since the entry of Austria into the EU in 1995 and the associated scrapping of these checks, this wall has been removed apart from a small section. On this section of wall there is a memorial tablet for the two policemen, Klaus März and Georg Schachner, who were murdered on 11 November 1993 in an Intercity from Linz to Passau near Schärding.

Above the tracks since 1975 stands the first "bridge post office" in Germany.

== Train services ==
In the 2026 timetable, the following services stop at the station:

Line	Route		Frequency	Operator
ICE 1	Hamburg-Altona – Hamburg – Essen – Duisburg – Düsseldorf – Cologne – Bonn – Koblenz – Mainz – Frankfurt Airport – Frankfurt – Würzburg – Nuremberg – Regensburg – Passau		Once a day	DB Fernverkehr
ICE 91	Wien – Linz – Passau – Nürnberg –	Erfurt – Berlin – Hamburg-Altona		DB Fernverkehr
ICE 91	Wien – Linz – Passau – Nürnberg –	Frankfurt Flughafen – Koblenz – Köln – Dortmund		DB Fernverkehr
NJ Amsterdam/Hamburg-Austria	Wien – Linz – Passau – Regensburg – Würzburg –	Göttingen – Hamburg – Hamburg-Altona		ÖBB
NJ Amsterdam/Hamburg-Austria	Wien – Linz – Passau – Regensburg – Würzburg –	Münster – Deventer – Amsterdam		ÖBB
RE 3	Passau Hbf – Vilshofen – Osterhofen – Plattling – Landshut (Bay) Hbf – Freising – München			DB Regio
REX Passau-Linz	Passau Hbf – Schärding – Wels Hbf – Linz Hbf			ÖBB
RB 46	Passau Hbf – Pocking – Mühldorf (Oberbayern)			Südostbayernbahn
R Passau-Linz	Passau Hbf – Schärding – Wels Hbf – Linz Hbf			ÖBB

== See also ==
- Rail transport in Germany
- Railway stations in Germany
