= BMW Group Plant Dingolfing =

BMW factory in Dingolfing, Bavaria, Germany

Coordinates: 48.64932°N 12.47142°E

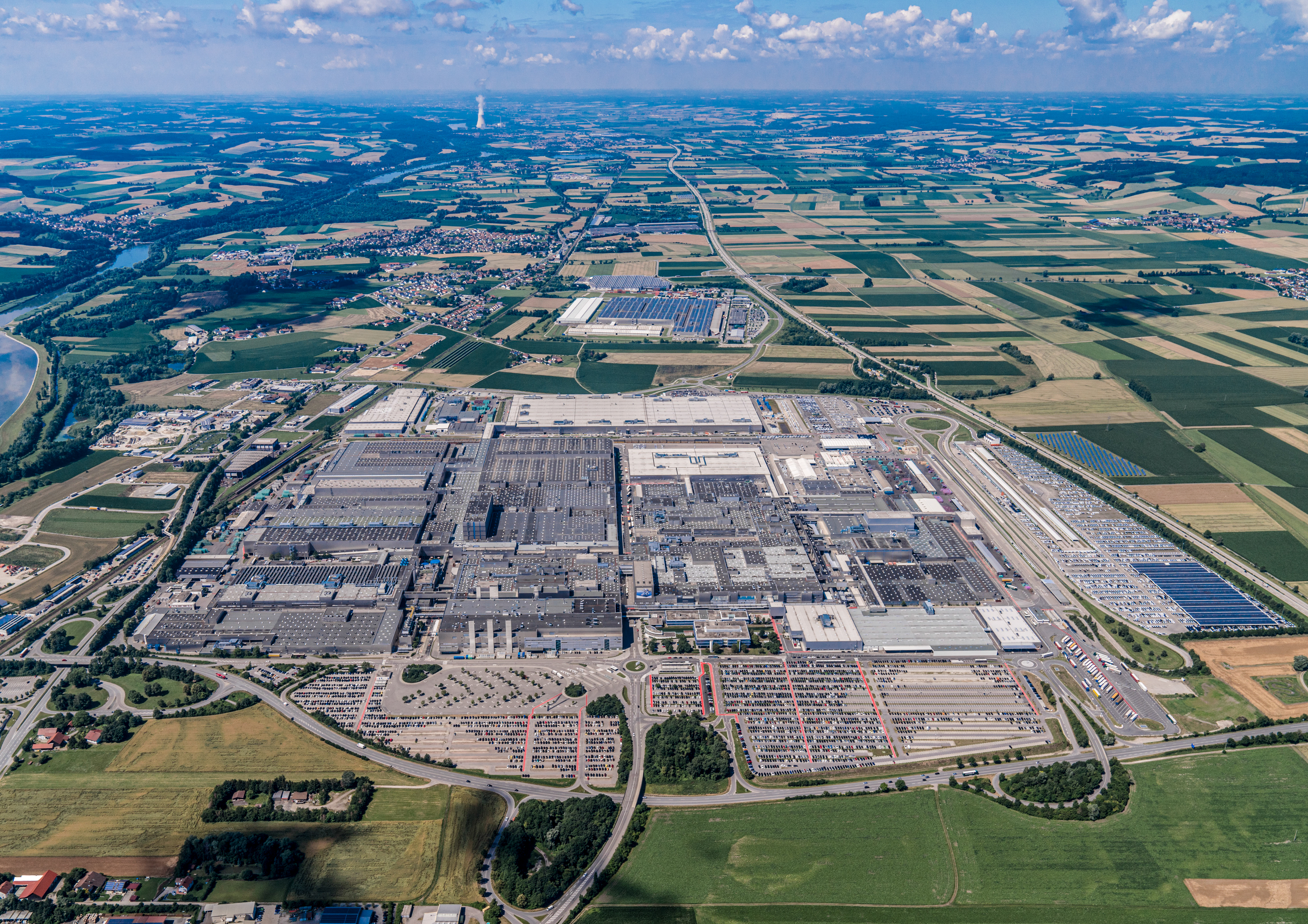
Aerial overview of the Dingolfing plant.

The BMW Group Plant Dingolfing is a network of BMW plants in Dingolfing, Dingolfing-Landau, Lower Bavaria, Germany with a total area of over 300 hectares.

Plant Dingolfing is the BMW Group’s largest European production site.

== History ==
The origins of the BMW Group Plant Dingolfing go back to the former Hans Glas GmbH, which had been based in Dingolfing since 1905. In 1967 BMW took over Hans Glas, in 1968 the production of chassis parts and motorcycle parts for BMWs began, production of the Goggomobil continued until 1969. On November 9, 1970, the foundation stone was laid for vehicle plant 02.40; on September 27, 1973, the first BMW 5 Series left the production line. Since then, more than twelve million BMW vehicles have been produced at the Dingolfing plant.

The factory produces up to 1,350 BMW automobiles a day, as well as bodyshells for all Rolls-Royce models. In addition, chassis and drive components as well as pressed parts are manufactured on site.

In 2017, a record production of 376,580 vehicles was achieved (2016: 339,769 vehicles).

In May 2022, The plant increased production of fifth-generation electric motor, high voltage batteries and battery modules for use in BMW iX and BMW i4.

== Figures, data, facts ==
=== Home of BMW's large model series ===
As the BMW Group’s “lead plant” for the luxury class, Plant Dingolfing has traditionally produced BMW’s large model series. Since the early 1970s, every generation of the BMW 5 Series, 6 Series and 7 Series has been built here, including M, plug-in hybrid and Individual variants. In recent years, these have been joined by the 4 Series models, as well as the updated BMW 8 Series. Since July 2021, the plant in Lower Bavaria has also produced the company’s new technology and innovation flagship: the fully-electric BMW iX. Dingolfing has a total of six BMW model series produced on site

=== Commuter bus traffic ===
A complex commuter bus system brings employees from all over Lower Bavaria to their workplace in Dingolfing. With 306 buses on the roads every day, this bus system clocks up a total of over 43,000 km.

== Plants ==
The BMW Group Plant Dingolfing was created by the takeover of Hans Glas GmbH in 1967. The former Glas plant became plant 02.10.

Plant	Address	Function	Speciality
02.10	Laaberstr. 7, 84130 Dingolfing	Chassis and drive components	former parent plant of Hans Glas GmbH
02.20	Karl-Dompert-Str. 1, 84130 Dingolfing	Competence Center E-Drive Production	
02.27	Tundingerstr. 11, 84164 Moosthenning	Rolls-Royce bodywork	
02.30	Mengkofener Str. 13, 84130 Dingolfing	Training and further education center	
02.40	Karl-Dompert-Str. 7, 84130 Dingolfing	Vehicle Plant	Rail connection to the Landshut–Plattling railway at km 27.7
02.60	Bierweg 1, 94342 Irlbach	Assembly plant for Gen6 high-voltage batteries Irlbach-Strasskirchen	
02.70	Industriestr. 5, 84130 Dingolfing	Dynamics Center (DYZ): spare parts delivery	Rail connection to the Landshut–Plattling railway at km 25.8
02.72	Gewerbepark 8, 84183 Niederviehbach	Chassis and drive components	
02.75	Am Industriepark 2, 84079 Bruckberg	Parts warehouse Bruckberg	
02.80	Bahnweg 3, 84180 Loiching	Parts warehouse Kronwieden	
02.92	Hans-Glas-Str. 1, 94522 Wallersdorf	Parts warehouse Wallersdorf	Rail connection to the Landshut–Plattling railway at km 54.2

=== Product range ===
At the BMW Group Dingolfing plant five series are currently being built including M, plug-in hybrid and Individual variants.

- BMW 4 Series
- BMW M4
- BMW 5 Series
- BMW M5
- BMW 7 Series
- BMW i7
- BMW 8 Series
- BMW iX Series
- BMW i5
