= Passau–Obertraubling railway =

Railway line in Germany

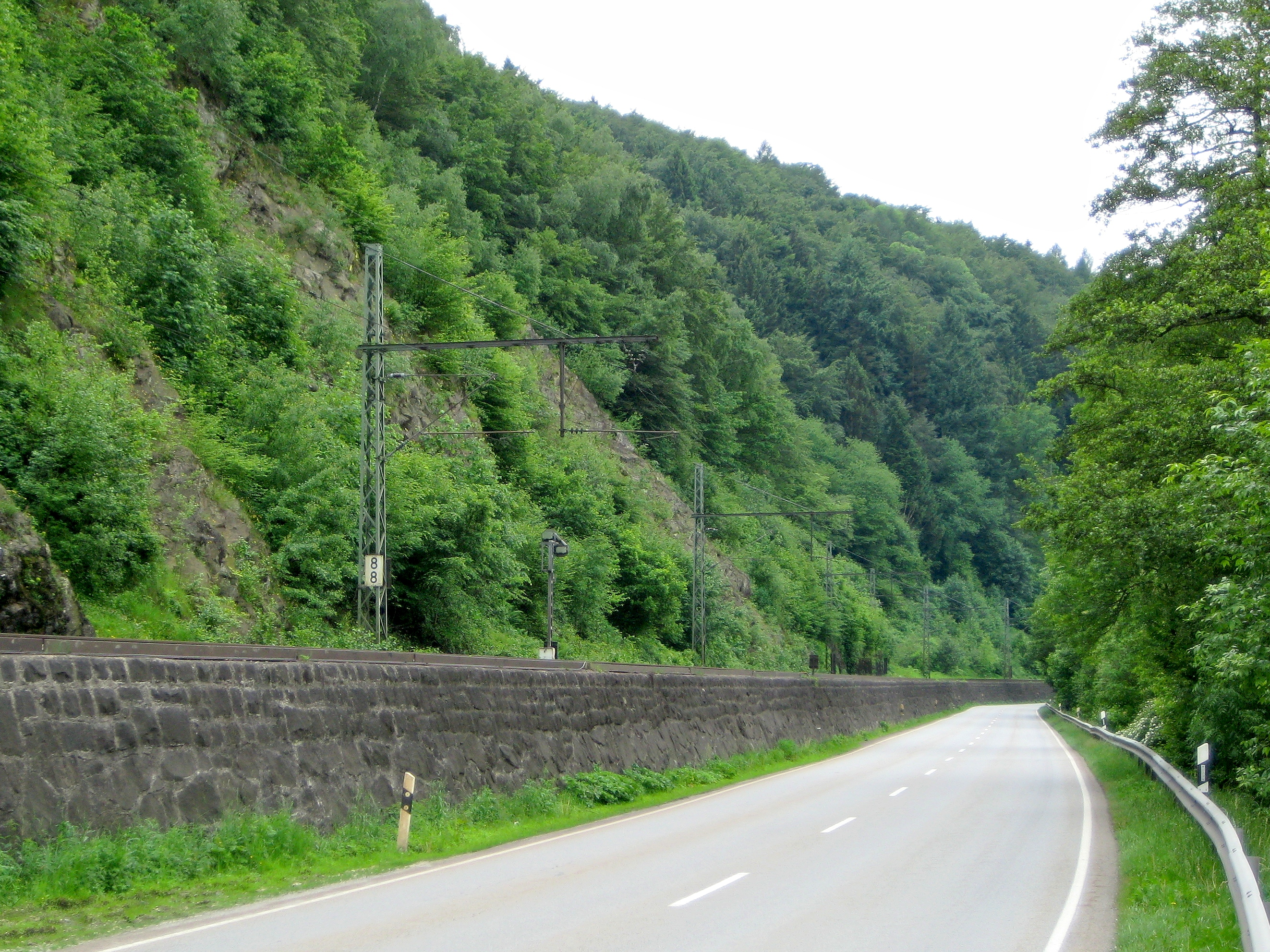
- Loewenwand

Overview
- Status: Operational
- Owner: Deutsche Bahn
- Line number: 5830
- Locale: Bavaria
- Termini: Regensburg Hauptbahnhof; Passau Hauptbahnhof
- Stations: 17

Service
- Type: Heavy rail, Passenger/Freight rail Intercity rail, Regional rail
- Route number: 880
- Operator(s): DB Bahn, Agilis

History
- Opened: Stages between 1859–1873

Technical
- Line length: 109.786 km (68.218 mi)
- Number of tracks: Double track
- Track gauge: 1,435 mm (4 ft 8 1/2 in) standard gauge
- Electrification: 15 kV/16.7 Hz AC overhead line
- Operating speed: 160 km/h (99 mph)

The Passau–Obertraubling railway forms a key transport link from Germany to Austria and other southeast European countries and is one of the most important main lines in southern Germany. It is double-tracked and electrified throughout.

== History ==
It was the Bavarian state that first wanted to establish a main line from Regensburg to Passau and initiated plans accordingly, but for financial reasons its actual construction was given to a private company. The Bavarian Eastern Railway Company or Bayerische Ostbahn opened the first section from Regensburg to Sünching on 12 December 1859. From Sünching the line swung away to Geiselhöring in the valley of the Kleinen Laaber, where trains continued on to Landshut and Munich. Trains to Passau had to change direction before they could continue to Straubing. After 20 September 1860 the route, getting ever closer to the Danube, continued from Straubing via Plattling and Vilshofen as far as the border city of Passau. On 1 September 1861 the railway line was finally connected to the Austrian Empress Elisabeth Railway with its access to Linz and Vienna.

On 1 July 1873 a direct route from Sünching to Straubing was opened, which considerably shortened the distance travelled. Similarly, from 6 August 1873, trains from Munich to Landshut could take a shorter route via Eggmühl and Neufahrn, which branched off the old line at Obertraubling. Between 1880 and 1897 the now superfluous section from Sünching to Geiselhöring was closed and later the one from Perkam to Straubing, after the link from Perkam to Radldorf was built on 30 September 1896, which formed a junction with the main line.

The entire route came under the control of the Royal Bavarian State Railways on 10 May 1875 when the Ostbahn was transferred into state ownership.

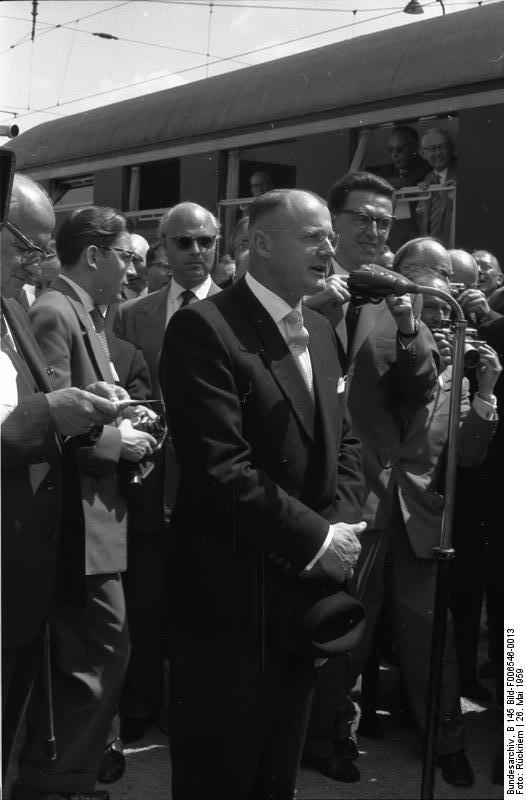
Inauguration of electrification on 26 May 1959

== Operations ==
=== Today ===
Since the timetable change on 9 December 2007 a total of six pairs of modern ICE-T trains have worked the line at two-hourly intervals along with one Intercity pair of trains per day. The IC pair starts and ends at Passau, the ICE trains run on to Vienna. The long-distance stops are Regensburg, Plattling and Passau.

Regional-Express and Regionalbahn trains run hourly providing local services between Passau and Plattling and stopping at Vilshofen and Osterhofen. The Regional-Express trains run from Plattling directly to Munich. Regionalbahn trains also run hourly (two hourly at weekends) between Plattling and Regensburg, which continue to Neumarkt in der Oberpfalz and are sometimes connected through to and from Passau.

=== The future of passenger services ===
From the timetable change on 13 December 2009 the Danube-Isar Express will work part of the line. This is a Regional-Express route, which links Munich to Landshut, Plattling and Passau hourly and will stop at the remaining passenger stations on the route no. KBS 880, i.e. Plattling, Osterhofen, Vilshofen and Passau. It will replace all the previous Regionalbahn train services between Plattling and Passau.

== See also ==
- Passau Hauptbahnhof
- Regensburg Hauptbahnhof
