= Agilis =

German rail transport company

agilis
- Company type: Rail transport
- Founded: 2009
- Headquarters: Regensburg, Germany
- Area served: Bavaria, Germany
- Website: agilis.de

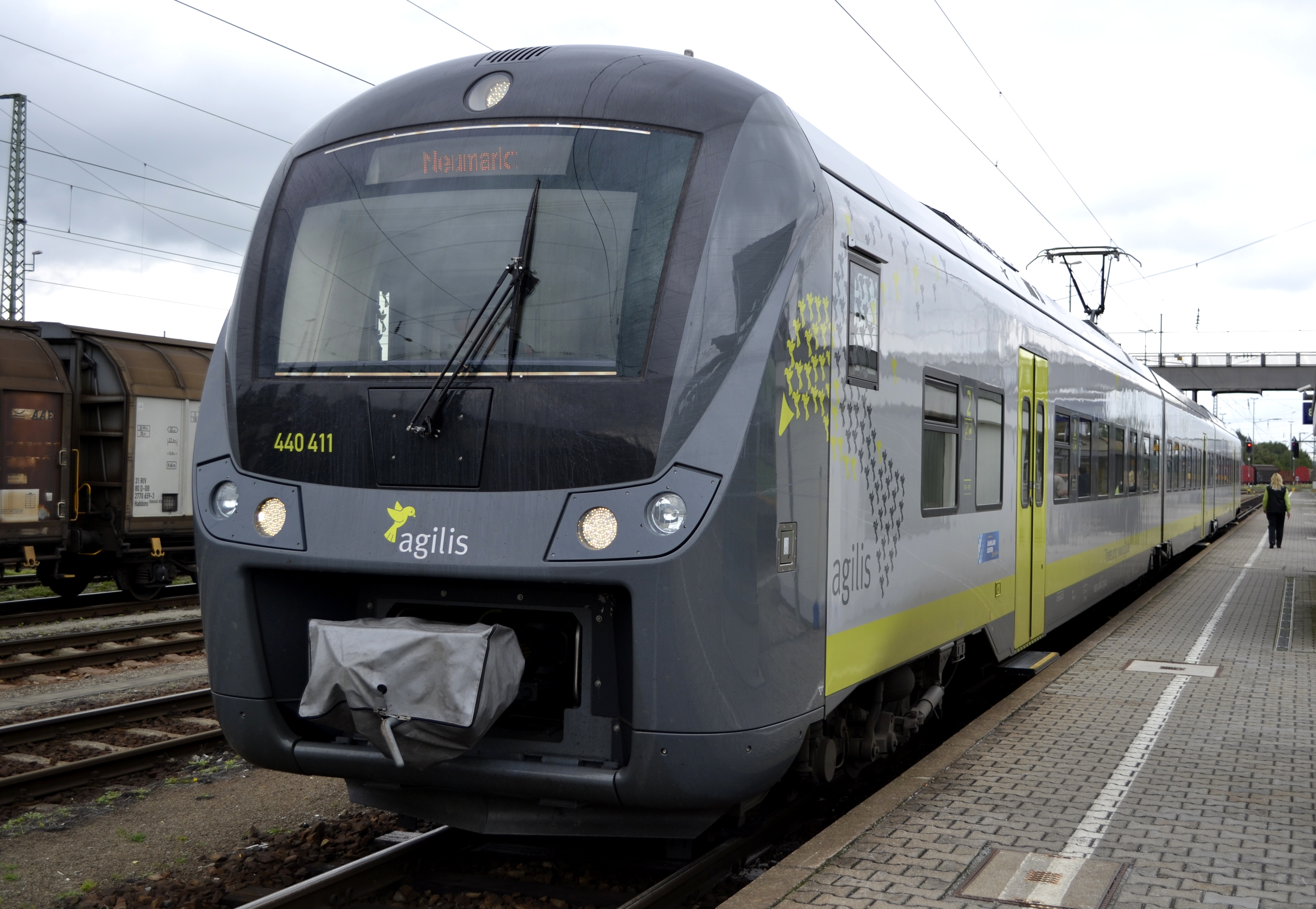
Alstom Coradia Continental of agilis Eisenbahngesellschaft

agilis Eisenbahngesellschaft (railway company) and agilis Verkehrsgesellschaft (transportation company) operate railway passenger services in Bavaria. The companies do not capitalise their names. They are subsidiaries of BeNEX GmbH, based in Hamburg. BeNEX is owned by International Public Partnerships Limited.

== Services ==
Mid Area
Line	Route
RB 15	Ulm – Günzburg – Donauwörth – Ingolstadt
RB 17	Ingolstadt Nord – Ingolstadt – Saal (Donau) – Regensburg – Radldorf (Niederbay) – Straubing – Plattling
RE 18	Ingolstadt – Saal (Donau) – Regensburg – Radldorf (Niederbay) – Straubing – Plattling (– Passau)
RB 51	Neumarkt (Oberpf) – Regensburg – Radldorf (Niederbay) – Straubing – Plattling

North Area
Line	Route
RB 18	Bad Rodach – Coburg
RB 22	Lichtenfels – Breitengüßbach – Bamberg – Forchheim – Ebermannstadt
RB 24	Coburg – Lichtenfels – Hochstadt-Marktzeuln – Neuenmarkt-Wirsberg – Bayreuth
RB 26	Ebern – Breitengüßbach – Bamberg – Forchheim
RB 34	Weidenberg – Bayreuth – Kirchenlaibach – Weiden
RB 95	Gutenfürst – Hof – Selb-Plößberg – Cheb – Marktredwitz
RB 96	Hof – Selb-Plößberg – Selb Stadt
RB 97	Bayreuth – Kirchenlaibach – Marktredwitz – Oberkotzau – Hof – Bad Steben
RB 98	Münchberg – Helmbrechts
RB 99	Hof – Oberkotzau – Münchberg – Neuenmarkt-Wirsberg
