= Bavarian Eastern Railway Company =

The Royal Bavarian Eastern Railway Company (Königlich privilegirte Actiengesellschaft der bayerischen Ostbahnen) or Bavarian Ostbahn was founded in 1856. Within just two decades it built an extensive railway network in the eastern Bavarian provinces of Upper Palatinate (Oberpfalz) and Lower Bavaria (Niederbayern) that had previously been largely undisturbed by the railway. Much of this network is still important for local and long distance rail traffic operated by the Deutsche Bahn today.

== Foundation ==
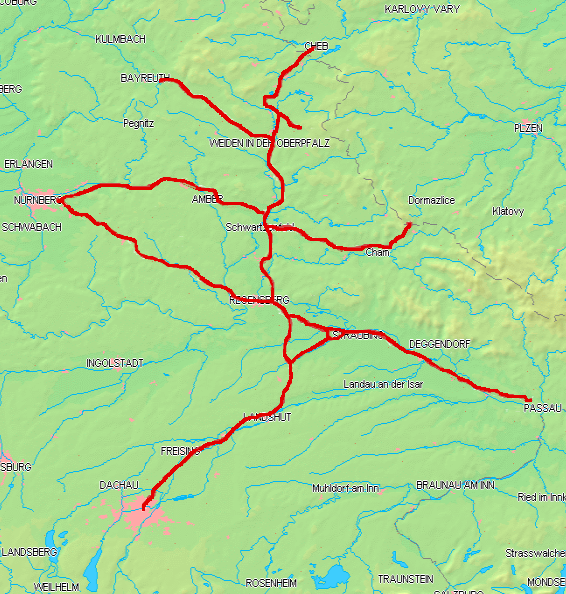
The Bavarian Eastern Railway Company network around 1875

The construction of the Bavarian state railway network had concentrated, during the first decade, on the 3 major lines: Ludwig's South-North Railway, Ludwig's Western Railway and the Bavarian Maximilian's Railway. At that point the majority of the Bavarian State Parliament rejected any further expansion of the state railway network due to the state's financial situation and the fact that railway operations were still largely unprofitable in those days. As a result, large parts of eastern Bavaria would still have remained unconnected to the railway network had not parliament passed a law on 19 March 1856, which permitted more private railway companies to be established and simplified their financing by the offer of guaranteed, state interest rates.

As well as private individuals, businessmen, factory owners and brewers from eastern Bavaria, others from outside the region became involved in order to improve their own businesses. These included Maximilian Karl, 6th Prince of Thurn and Taxis and four commercial institutions from Regensburg, as well as the manufacturers Theodor von Cramer-Klett of Nuremberg and J.A. Maffei of Munich. They generated a start-up capital of 60 million gulden for railway construction in eastern Bavaria and for the associated running and rolling stock. In the same year they founded the Bavarian Eastern Railway.

King Maximilian II of Bavaria authorised the founding of the company on 12 April 1856 and awarded it the concession they had applied for:

...for the construction and operation of railways

from Nuremberg via Amberg to Regensburg,

from Munich via Landshut to the Danube,

from Regensburg via Straubing and Passau to the state border,

from the Amberg-Regensburg line at Schwandorf to the state border at Furth near Pilsen.....

The manager of the new company was the well-known railway engineer, Paul Camille von Denis (1795 – 1872), who had not only built the first German railway line from Nuremberg to Fürth, but also the first railway lines in other German states. Von Denis succeeded in building the routes named in the concession to operational status within just 5 years and delivered them at a saving of 17 million gulden against the estimated costs of 60 million.

== Railway construction ==
Passenger services began operating on the first railway line in eastern Bavaria on 3 November 1858. This line ran from the state capital, Munich, via Freising to the Lower Bavarian capital of Landshut, a total of 71 kilometres. Goods services started up 12 days later. In Munich, the Ostbahn had its own station on the site of the present-day Starnberg station. One year later, on 12 December 1859, the route was extended via Neufahrn and Geiselhöring to Straubing on the Danube (57 km). From Geiselhöring a branch also ran in the direction of Regensburg and on through the Upper Palatinate via Schwandorf, Amberg and Neukirchen to Hersbruck (left of the Pegnitz River)—a total of 133 km of line. The Hersbruck–Nuremberg section (28 km) was already being worked from 9 May 1859. The Straubing–Plattling–Passau line, 77 km long, was opened by the Ostbahn on 20 September 1860. In Landshut and Regensburg, terminal stations were built that were converted to intermediate stations in 1880 and 1873 respectively.

For the businessmen participating in the Ostbahn the continuation of historical trade links across the borders to Austria and Bohemia, albeit using the faster railways, was extremely important. As a result, the first link to the Austrian railway network was made as early as 1 September 1861 at Passau via a junction with the Empress Elisabeth Railway. In the same year a connexion with the Bohemian Western Railway to Pilsen followed. This line ran from Schwandorf via Cham (reached on 7 January) and Furth im Wald (20 September) to the border (15 October). Inside five years 446 kilometres of track had been built for the railway network authorised in the first concession of 1856.

Schwandorf station soon became the railway hub in central Upper Palatinate. At Irrenlohe station—situated 4 km north of Schwandorf on the line to Nuremberg—the 40 km line to Weiden was started, which ran along the Naab valley. There it divided into two branches: the one to Bayreuth (58 km) being completed on 1 December 1863 and the second to Mitterteich (39 km) on 15 August 1864. From there the junction at Eger in Bohemia was reached on 15 October 1865, establishing a third link, 21 km long, with the Austrian/Bohemian railway network. The construction of two short harbour railways to the Danube docks in Regensburg and Passau on 1 October 1865 brought the second construction phase, approved by a concession of 3 January 1862, to a close.

After a pause in investment of several years, a further concession was granted on 3 August 1869 under which problems and detours in the network from the early years were ironed out between 1871 and 1873, so that the largest cities of the region could be connected by the shortest routes, for example Nuremberg with Regensburg via Neumarkt, Regensburg with Straubing via Radldorf, and Regensburg with Landshut via Neufahrn. These roughly 160 kilometre long links, together with a stub line from Wiesau to Tirschenreuth, went into service in 1872/73. Operation of the direct route from Nuremberg to Regensburg via the Franconian/Upper Palatine Jura mountains, that shortened the distance by about 40 kilometres, was only possible with the use of powerful new locomotives. Also in this construction programme were the 81 km long Mühldorf (Obb)–Neumarkt (Rott)–Pilsting–Plattling route, opened on 15 October 1875, and the Weiden–Neukirchen bei Sulzbach line, 51.5 km long, that was opened the same day.

A fourth, 72 kilometre long, railway connexion running over the border from Plattling via Deggendorf and Zwiesel to Bayerisch Eisenstein (the so-called Bavarian Forest Railway) with its junction to the Pilsen-Priesen-Komotau railway, for which the Ostbahn had been granted a concession in 1872, was still under construction when nationalisation occurred. It was opened in 1877 by the Royal Bavarian State Railways. The same was true for the 41.6 km long link line from Landshut to Pilsting, opened on 15 May 1880, with a junction to the Mühldorf (Obb)–Plattling line.

== Nationalisation ==
In the years of recession after the Franco-Prussian War of 1870/71 the Ostbahn's economic situation worsened, so that in 1874 a claim was made on the state interest guarantee. As a result, the Bavarian state decided to take over the private railway. With a law passed on 15 April 1875 the Ostbahn was bought out on 10 May 1875 and merged with the Royal Bavarian State Railways on 1 January 1876. The Bavarian Eastern Railway at this point had a railway network 905 kilometres long and capital stock of 80 million gulden. To pay for the takeover, the Bavarian state issued bonds totalling around 167 million marks. In addition it took on the company's major debts of around 40 million marks. For each share valued at 200 gulden, shareholders were given this 4% Bavarian state bond worth 400 marks.

== Locomotives and wagons ==
It should be mentioned at the outset that all the locomotives bought by the Bavarian Ostbahn were built by J.A. Maffei in Munich. This is understandable because Maffei's managing director had played a key role in the provision of start-up capital for the Ostbahn. From that fund, the company had earmarked 6.6 million gulden for the procurement of vehicles. In addition to locomotives, the company planned to purchase of 200 passenger coaches, 30 luggage vans, 720 covered vans and 398 open wagons for various purposes.

In December 1857 the company procured Crampton locomotives (Class A) with a 4-2-0 wheel arrangement for fast passenger services. These 12 engines had 1,219 mm diameter carrying wheels and 1,829 mm diameter driving wheels. From 1859 a further 12 engines were bought from Maffei with a wheel arrangement of 2-2-2. All the engines were rebuilt in 1869 to 2-4-0 and grouped as Class B locomotives.

In the early period, no goods-only trains were operated; instead goods wagons were attached to the passenger trains. For these mixed trains and, later on, the passenger-only trains, a total of 85 Class B locomotives with a 2-4-0 wheel arrangement were procured over the years.

Not until 1862 did the Ostbahn procure Class C six-coupled engines with a 0-6-0 arrangement and, initially, with large wheels, 1,524 mm in diameter. A total of 64 such locomotives were bought in various wheel sizes, later mainly with a 1,253 mm diameter, that also hauled goods-only trains from 1867.

The Ostbahn procured 12 Class D tank locomotives and two more were taken over from the Deggendorf-Plattling Railway.

Class	Quantity	Type	Delivered	K.B.Sts.B. Class	Retired
A	24	2A n2	1857-59	B IX*	1902-08
B	66	1B n2	1858-66	B V	1900-11
B	19	1B n2	1873-75	B IX	1907-12
C	12	C n2	1862-63	C II	1899-06
C	52	C n2	1867-75	C III	1921-24
D	14	B n2t	1866-71	D II	1895-24
E	2	B n2	1869	B V	1900-08

/*after rebuilding into 2-4-0 engines around 1870

Details of the individual locomotive classes may be found in the List of Bavarian locomotives and railbuses.

== Sources ==
- Born, 100 Jahre Bayerische Ostbahn und ihre Fahrzeuge, München 1958
- Bräunlein, Manfred Die Ostbahnen, Königlich privilgiert und bayerisch; 1851 bis 1875; Nürnberg 2000
- Ücker, Bernhard, 150 Jahre Eisenbahn in Bayern, Fürstenfeldbruck 1985
- Wolfgang Klee/Ludwig v. Welser, Bayern-Report, Bände 1 – 5, Fürstenfeldbruck, 1993-1995.
- Dt. Reichsbahn, Die deutschen Eisenbahnen in ihrer Entwicklung 1835-1935, Berlin, 1935.
- Böhm, Karl: Eisenbahnbau München - Straubing, in Jahresbericht des Historischen Vereins für Straubing und Umgebung, 82. Jg. 1980, Straubing 1981.
- Zeitler, Walther, Eisenbahnen in Niederbayern und in der Oberpfalz, 2. Auflage Amberg, 1997

== See also ==
- History of rail transport in Germany
- Royal Bavarian State Railways
- List of Bavarian locomotives and railbuses
