= Landshut–Plattling railway =

Overview
- Line number: 5634

Service
- Route number: 931

Technical
- Line length: 62.9 km (39.1 mi)
- Track gauge: 1,435 mm (4 ft 8 1/2 in) standard gauge
- Operating speed: 140 km/h (87 mph)
Route map
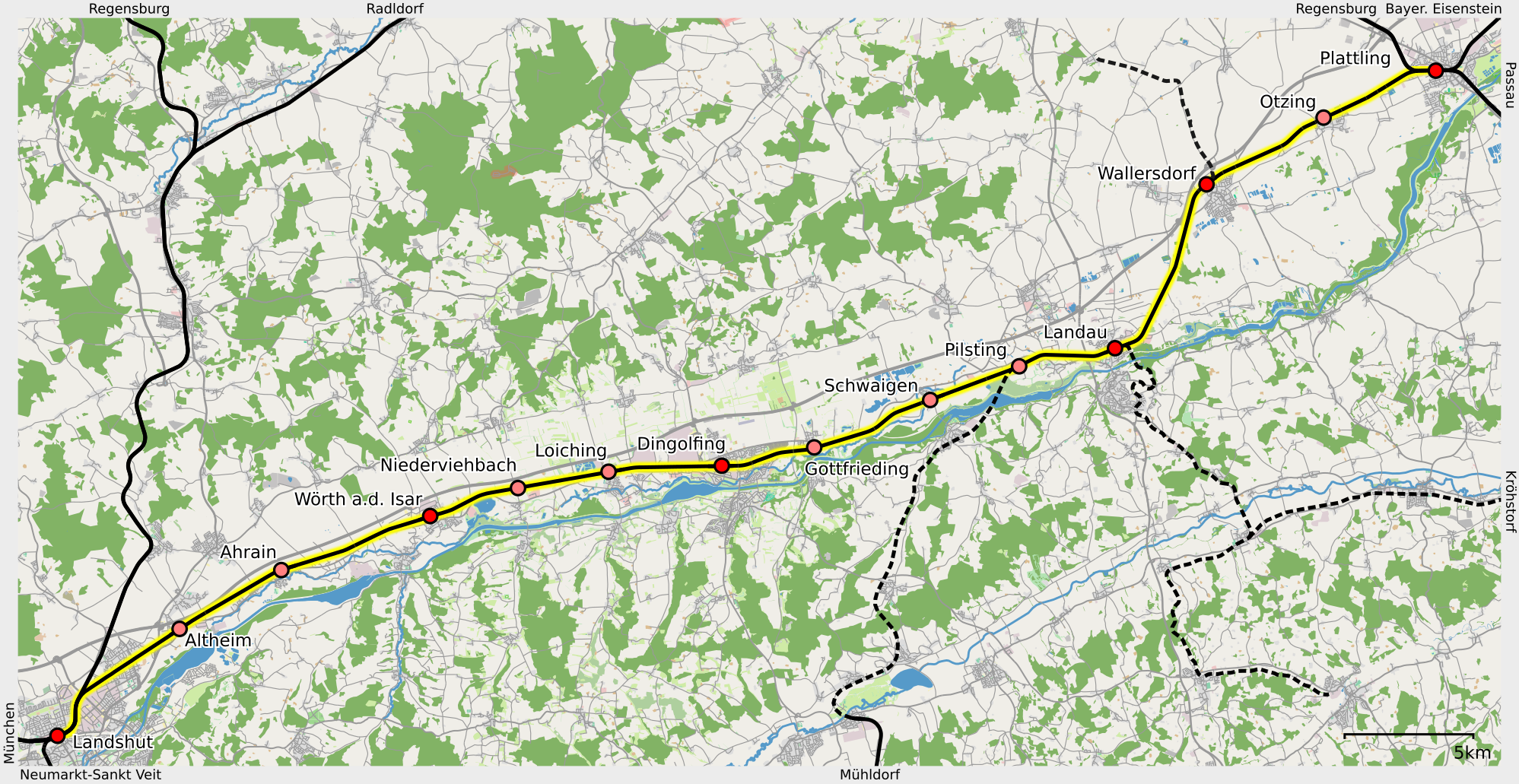

The Landshut–Plattling railway is a single-tracked, electrified main line in Lower Bavaria, in southern Germany. It runs along the Isar river and is part of the line between Munich and Passau.

== History ==
The route was completed between Plattling and Pilsting on 15 October 1875 and between Landshut and Pilsting on 15 May 1880. It was intended to link Munich to Prague as the southern section of the Bavarian Forest railway, but due to the unfavourable terrain through the mountains of the Bohemian Forest, there was never a large amount of cross-border traffic on the line. Instead much of it went (as it still does today) via Regensburg and the Schwandorf–Furth in the Wald railway.

Even as the route from Landshut to Pilsting was being built, the section from Pilsting to Landau (Isar) was expanded to two tracks. This second track was lifted in 1942, due to the war, and transferred to the occupied territories.

Electric operations began on 25 May 1976 in order to avoid the time-consuming and costly change of locomotives in Landshut and Plattling for trains on the Munich–Landshut–Plattling–Passau route. This 83-kilometre-long (52 mi) route was electrified and upgraded at a cost of 13 million DM (6.6 M euros). Three new bridges were built, one torn down and 1,035 catenary masts erected.

== Operations ==
There are 35 level crossings on the Landshut–Landau (Isar) section.

=== Current operations ===
In the 2009 timetable the passenger trains services on route number KBS 931 are:

- The Regional-Express service, Passau–Plattling–Landshut–Munich, which is worked every two hours by electric locomotives of Class 111 hauling two double-decker coaches and two Silberling local passenger coaches (or n-coaches) in push-pull operations with 374 seats in 2nd class and 42 in 1st class. At peak times they are reinforced by additional double-deckers and n-coaches. At the weekend, they operated with four double-deckers and two n-coaches.
- In addition, since 1998, a Plattling–Landshut–Freising–Munich RegionalBahn train runs every two hours, sometimes only as far as Landshut or Freising, and comprising push-pull trains, formed from Class 143 locomotives with four to five n-coaches. These Regionalbahn trains are usually timetabled to meet at Dingolfing.
- During morning and evening peak times other Regionalbahn trains are underway. In the afternoon, they also provide a connexion at Landshut to the Regional-Express trains from Munich. They are formed from Class 143 locomotives with five n-coaches or Class 111 locomotives with two double-deckers and four n-coaches.

Passenger trains are timetabled to cross at all available crossing stations en route.

In addition, quite a few long goods trains run from Dingolfing (BMW factory) via Landshut to Munich and Regensburg.

=== Future of passenger services ===
With effect from the timetable change on 13 December 2009, passenger services are due to be exclusively providely by the Danube-Isar Express (Donau-Isar-Express), a Regional-Express line, that will connect Munich with Landshut, Plattling and Passau hourly. This was announced during the tender process to DB Regio. In addition a late weekend connexion from about 0:45 hours from Landshut to Passau will be provided. In connexion with this, the current Munich–Plattling Regionalbahn train will be scrapped. Once the Danube-Isar Express goes into service, trains will no longer stop at Otzing halt. However, the majority of trains will then call at the two other current Regionalbahn stations at Wallersdorf and Wörth (Isar). In order to provide hourly services at all stops, the route will have to be upgraded for higher speeds and longer double-tracked crossing sections.

== Expansion measures ==
Before the arrival of the Danube-Isar Express, the section from Dingolfing to Landau is being modernised and upgraded to take higher speeds, a new platform is being built at Dingolfing on track 1 and an electronic signal box installed to reduce the waiting time when trains cross.

== Sources ==
Eisenbahnen in Niederbayern and der Oberpfalz, Walther Zeitler, Buch&Kunstverlag Oberpfalz, Amberg 1985/1997, ISBN 3-924350-61-2
