= Rokle =

- Municipality
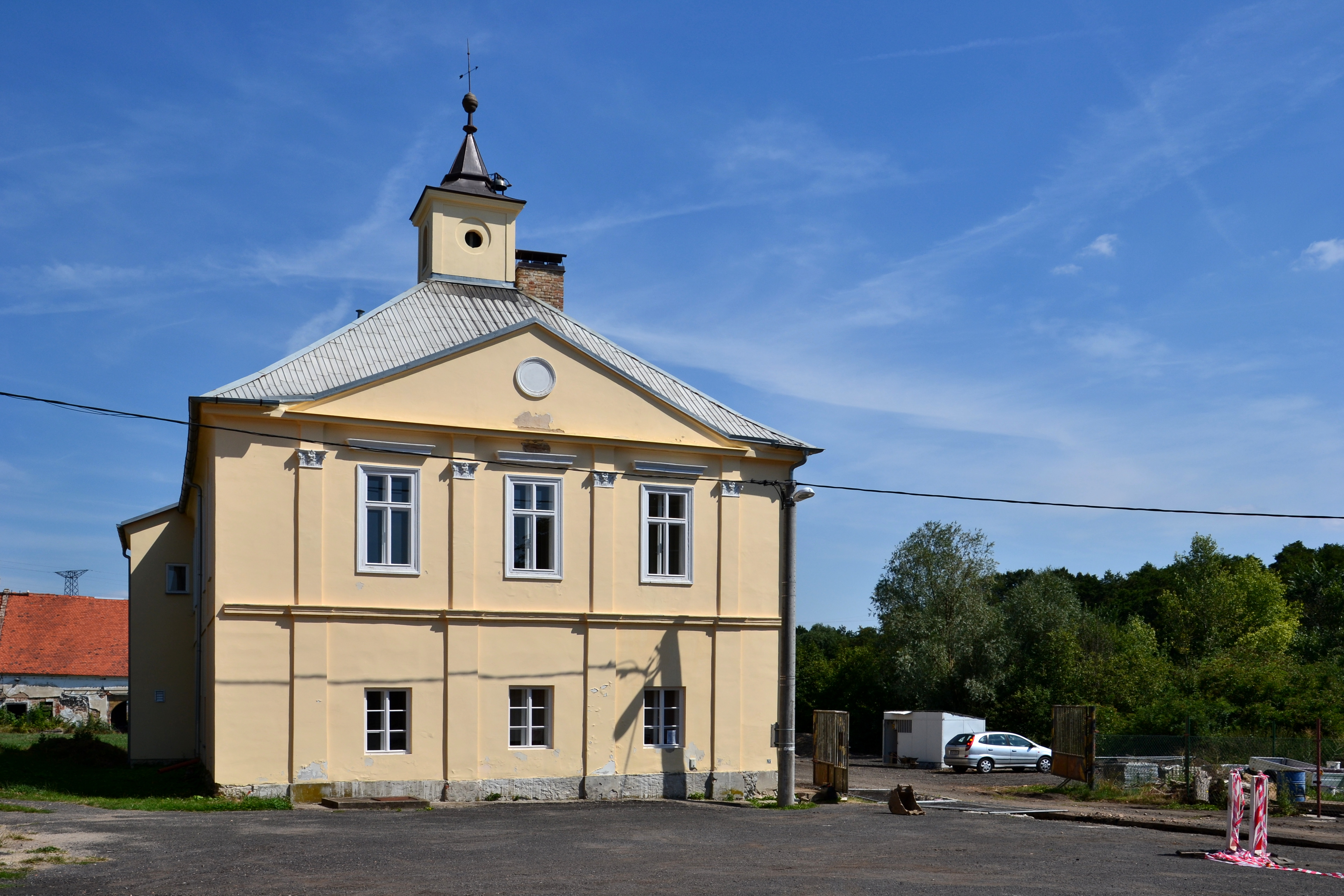
- Rokle Castle

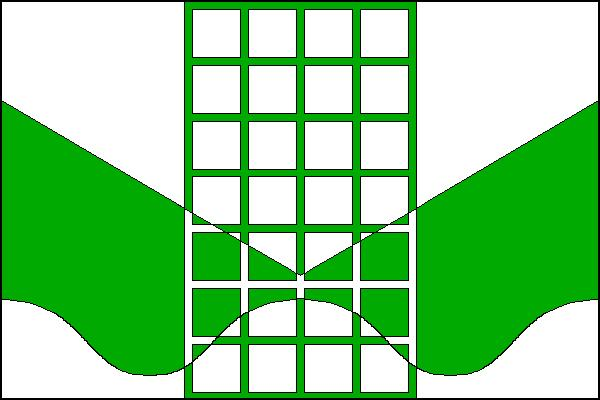
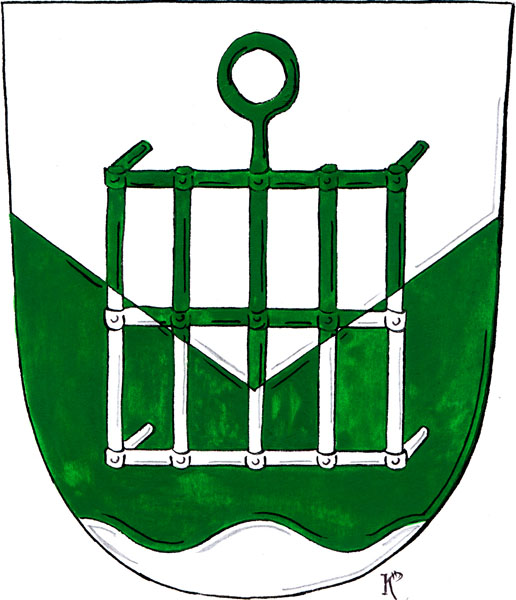
- Flag Coat of arms

- Location in the Czech Republic
- Coordinates: 50°21′12″N 13°17′56″E
- Country: Czech Republic
- Region: Ústí nad Labem
- District: Chomutov
- First mentioned: 1367

Area
  - Total: 13.57 km^{2} (5.24 sq mi)
- Elevation: 340 m (1,120 ft)

Population (2026-01-01)
  - Total: 450
  - Density: 33/km^{2} (86/sq mi)
- Time zone: UTC+1 (CET)
  - Summer (DST): UTC+2 (CEST)
- Postal code: 432 01
- Website: www.obecrokle.cz

Rokle (German: Rachel) is a municipality and village in Chomutov District in the Ústí nad Labem Region of the Czech Republic. It has about 500 inhabitants.

Rokle lies approximately 15 kilometres (9 mi) south-west of Chomutov, 63 km (39 mi) south-west of Ústí nad Labem, and 85 km (53 mi) west of Prague.

== Administrative division ==
Rokle consists of five municipal parts (in brackets population according to the 2021 census):

- Rokle (49)
- Hradec (227)
- Krásný Dvoreček (10)
- Nová Víska u Rokle (47)
- Želina (55)

== Demographics ==
Historical population
Year	Pop.	±%
1869	644	—
1880	624	−3.1%
1890	590	−5.4%
1900	667	+13.1%
1910	640	−4.0%
1921	654	+2.2%
1930	653	−0.2%
1950	411	−37.1%
1961	365	−11.2%
1970	252	−31.0%
1980	220	−12.7%
1991	172	−21.8%
2001	216	+25.6%
2011	268	+24.1%
2021	388	+44.8%
Source: Censuses

== Economy ==
Hradec substation is located in the municipality.
