= Hradec substation =

Coordinates: 50°20′46″N 13°19′43″E

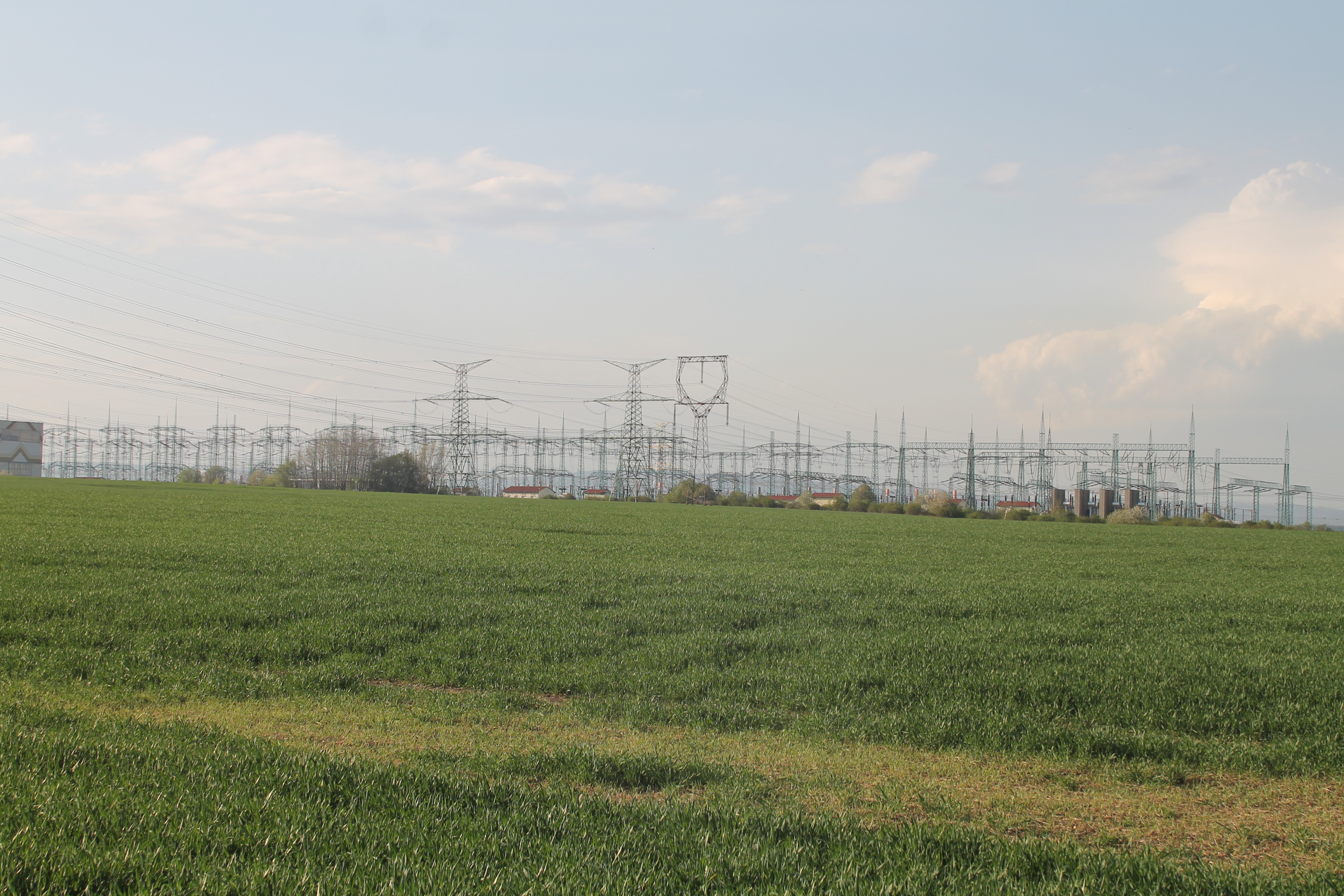
Hradec substation

Hradec substation (Czech: rozvodna Hradec) is a collector substation connecting the 220 kV and 400 kV grid in the Czech Republic's electricity grid. It is situated in Rokle near its local part Hradec in the Ústí nad Labem Region.

== Description ==
In Hradec the high voltage transmission lines from the surrounding lignite-fired power stations come together and the distribution of load takes place. Hradec is starting point of two high voltage transmission lines to Germany, a 400 kV line to Röhrsdorf in Saxony and a 400 kV line to Etzenricht in Bavaria. The transmission capacity of the line to Röhrsdorf, which went into service during 1976, is 2640 MW. The 220 kV link to Zwönitz, which was built in the 1950s, no longer exists. There are direct 400 kV interconnections from the substation to Tušimice and Prunéřov power stations.

The 400 kV line to Etzenricht is connected from the busbar to the termination portal on the area of the substation via an underground cable.

== Lines ==
400 kV-lines lead to:

- Röhrsdorf (2 circuits)
- Etzenricht (1 circuit)
- Řeporyje (1 circuit)
- Mírovka (1 circuit)
- Chrást (1 circuit)
- Výškov (1 circuit)

220 kV-lines lead to:

- Vítkov (2 circuits)
- Výškov (2 circuits)

== See also ==
- Energy in the Czech Republic
