= GKK Etzenricht =

Former electrical substation in Germany

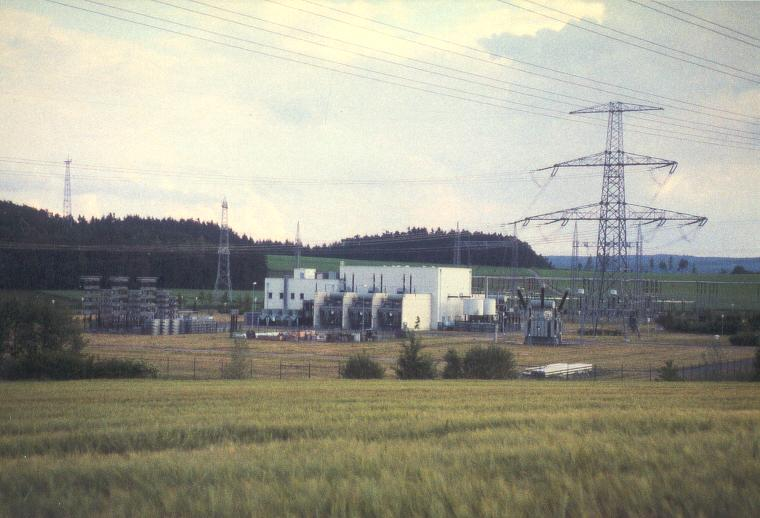
GKK Etzenricht

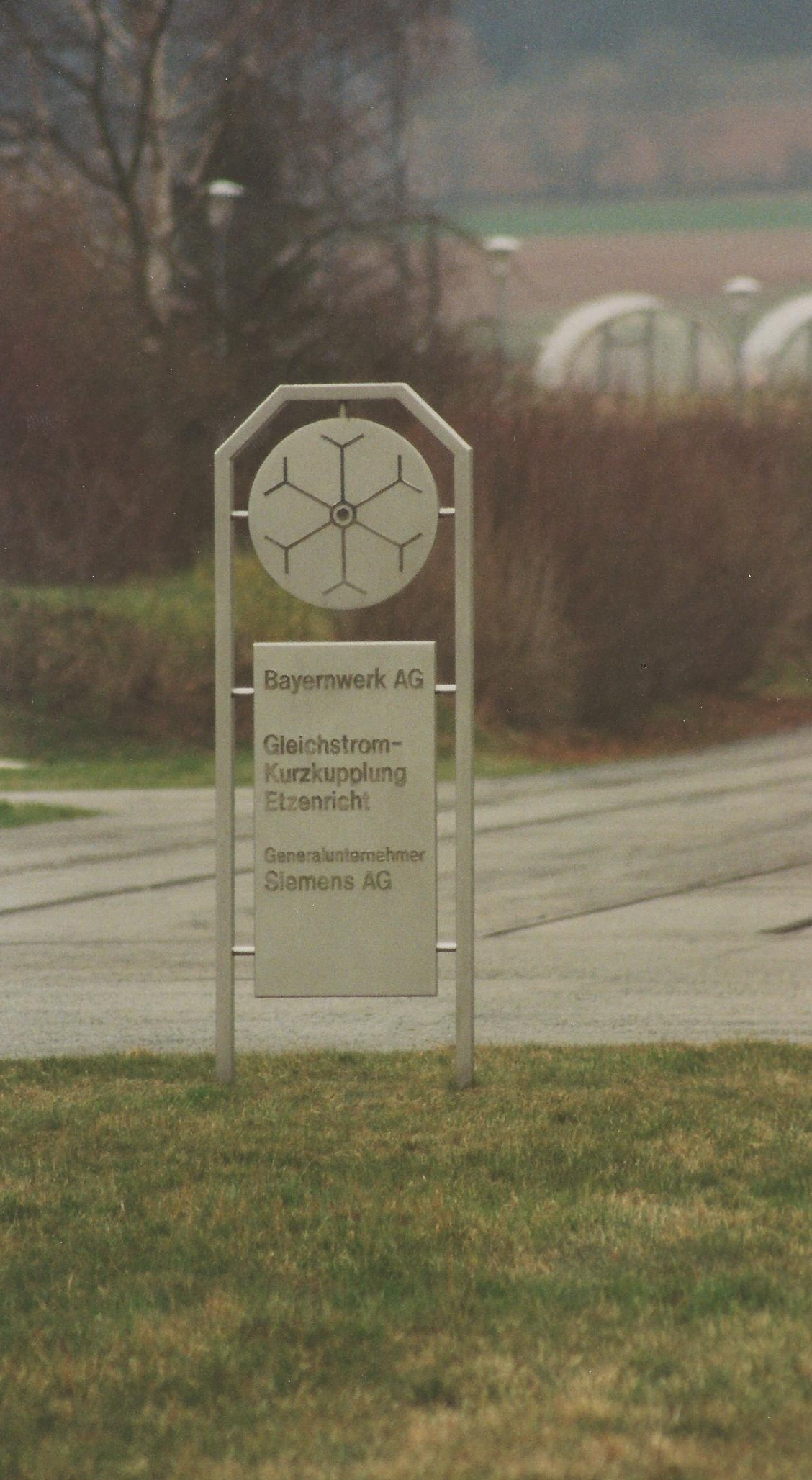
Sign in front of the inverter hall, photographed in spring 1999, 3.5 years after shut-down

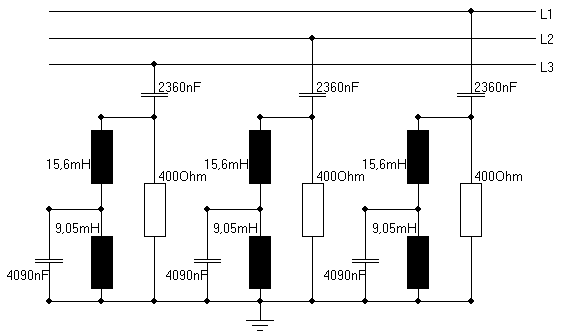
Harmonics filter of HVDC back-to-back station in Etzenricht

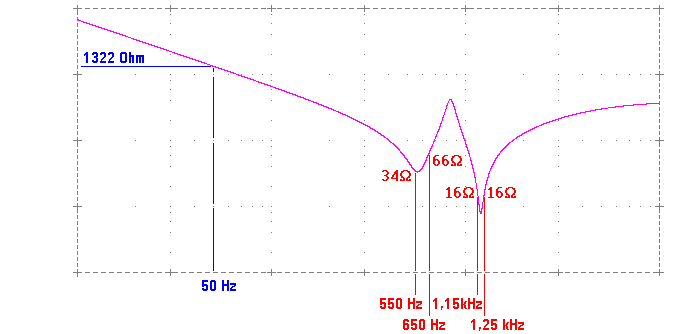
Impedance of AC filter used at GKK Etzenricht in dependence of frequency. Power grid frequency and their 11th, 13th, 23rd and 25th harmonics are marked

GKK Etzenricht, an abbreviation of Gleichstromkurzkupplung Etzenricht, meaning Etzenricht HVDC-back-to-back station, was an HVDC back-to-back facility near Etzenricht in the district of Neustadt an der Waldnaab in Bavaria, Germany. It was built on the site of the Etzenricht substation, a 380 kV/220 kV/110 kV-substation, which went into service in 1970 and expanded afterwards several times. The facility was used between 1993 and 1995 for the exchange of power between Germany and the Czech Republic, operated by Bayernwerk AG (now part of TenneT).

== History ==
Construction started April 26, 1991 and was completed September 1991. First power was achieved in May 1992 and a powerline to Hradec, Czech Republic was completed September 3, 1992.

Trial operation started January 27, 1993 with official opening July 9, 1993. It was shut down after synchronisation of the German and the Czech Power Grid on October 18, 1995.

After the synchronization of the power grids between Germany and Czech, the maximum amount of power which can be transmitted between Etzenricht and Hradec increased from 600 MW to 1316 MW. The inauguration of the second 380 kV-interconnection to Prestice substation on July 29, 1997 increased the transmission capacity from Etzenricht to Czech to further 1579 MW, so via Etzenricht substation today a maximum power exchange of 2895 MW between Czechia and Germany is possible.

In 1997, after inauguration of the second 380 kV-powerline to Czechia, which ends at Prestice substation, most external components of GKK Etzenricht were dismantled and stored on the area of the facility. Since beginning of this dismantling, the facility was not in working condition any more. Only the transformers, the smoothing reactor and one harmonic filter remained on their original sites. Since shutdown of the static inverter, it was planned to sell the installation to eastern Europe, where it would have allowed the construction of an HVDC back-to-back station for exchanging power between eastern Europe and the former Soviet Union. As the static inverter went more and more out of date and one was meanwhile able to build static inverters like that of GKK Etzenricht much simpler by using photo thyristors, no such deal ever took place. In 2006 the facility was sold to IDPC, an Austrian recycling company, which wanted first to sell the installation completely and as this did not work, part by part. However, only a few components were sold. In spring 2009 all remaining components of GKK Etzenricht were dismantled and scrapped.

== Technical features ==
GKK Etzenricht had a maximum transmission power of 600 megawatts (MW) and worked with a DC voltage of 160 kV. The two static inverters are in a 13-metre (43 ft) high hall with 430 square metres (4,630 sq ft) of surface area, which was built in a combination of local and finished concrete building method. Each static inverter consists of 432 thyristors, which are put in six thyristor towers arranged in a row. Each thyristor tower has 2 valve functions and consist of 8 thyristor modules, which are arranged one on top of the other. Each thyristor module consists of 9 thyristors switched in series and the necessary auxiliary equipment as the saturation coils, which are in series with the thyristors. Parallel to each thyristor a series combination of a resistor and a capacitor is switched, which limits the speed of current grow. From this combination the power for the supply of the electronic used for thyristor steering is gained. The electronic used for thyristor steering has at operation a high voltage potential against ground. It is connected to the main control electronic on ground potential by fiber-optic cables, which allow a bidirectional data transmission. Parallel to each thyristor module a capacitor and parallel to each valve function a varistor is switched. As thyristors the model U78 S346 S34 manufactured by Siemens, which has a maximum power rating of 4100 amperes and which was when GKK Etzenricht was built the most powerful thyristor in the world. At both ends of the hall there are three bays for the accommodation of the static inverter transformers, which are built as single-phase units.

== Pictures ==
=== Images of August 2008 ===
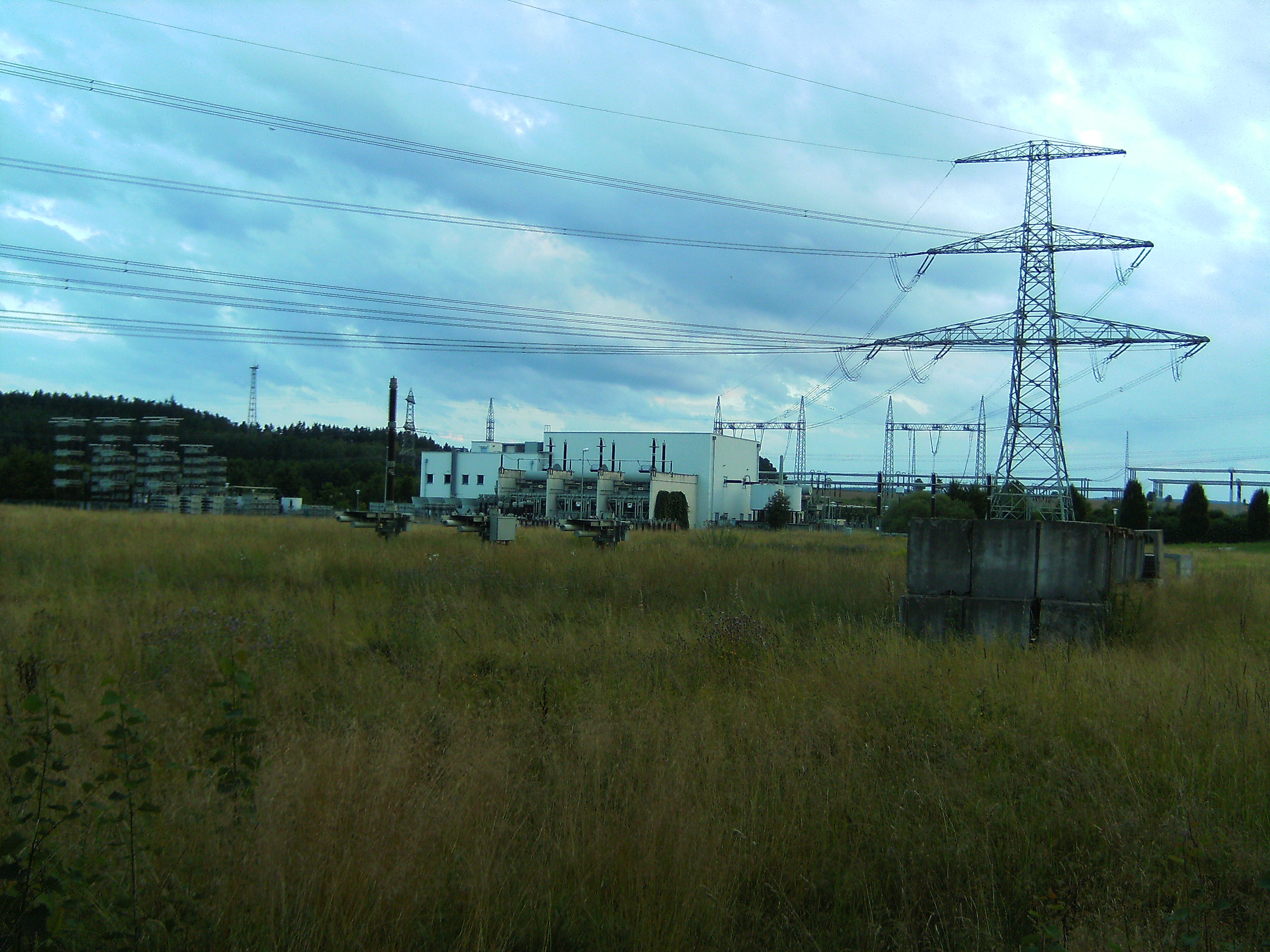
Switchyard of former GKK Etzenricht. On the right the pylon by which the powerline to Czech runs, left from this the valve hall, on the left the only remaining AC filter

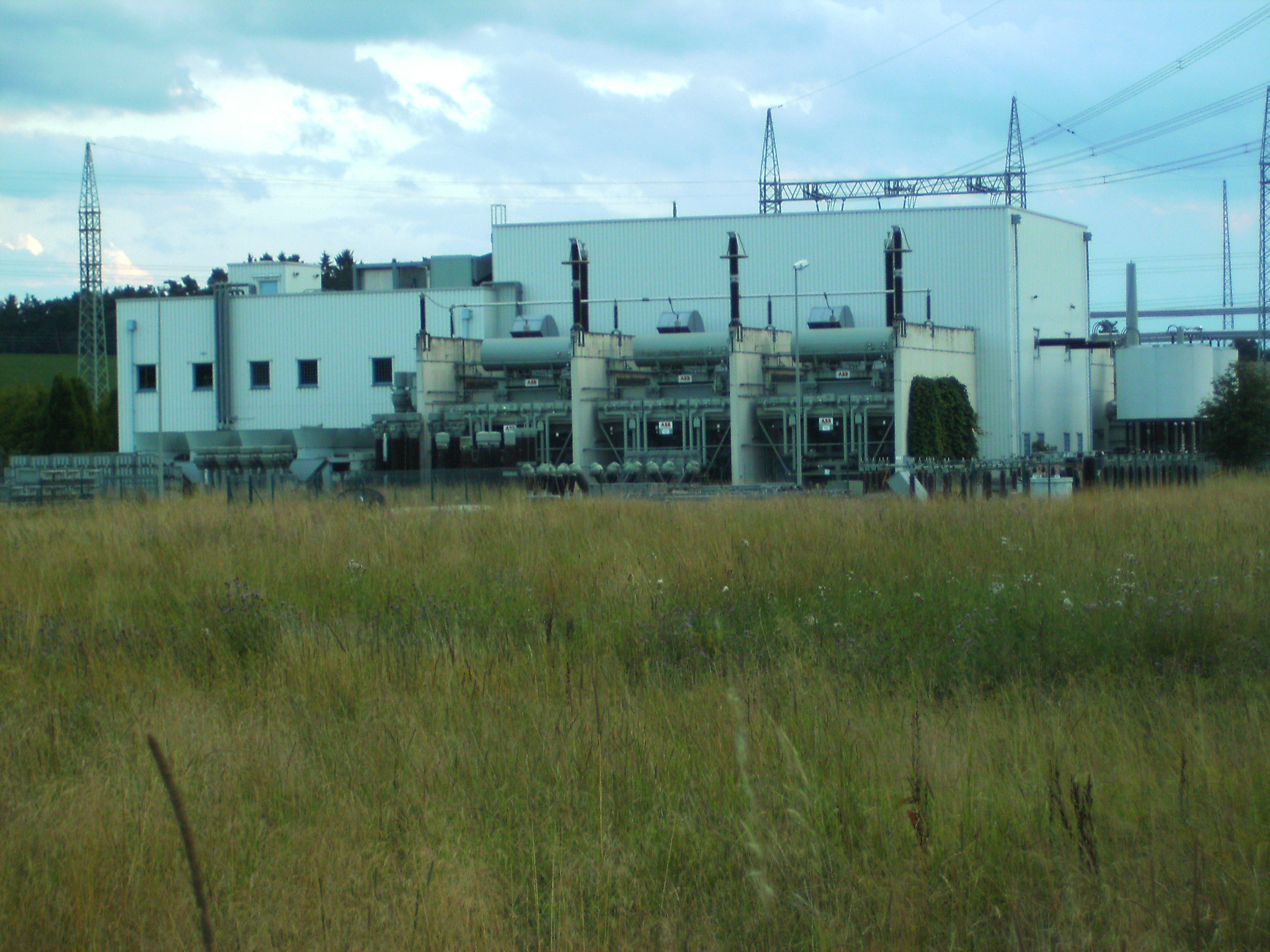
Valve Hall at Etzenricht

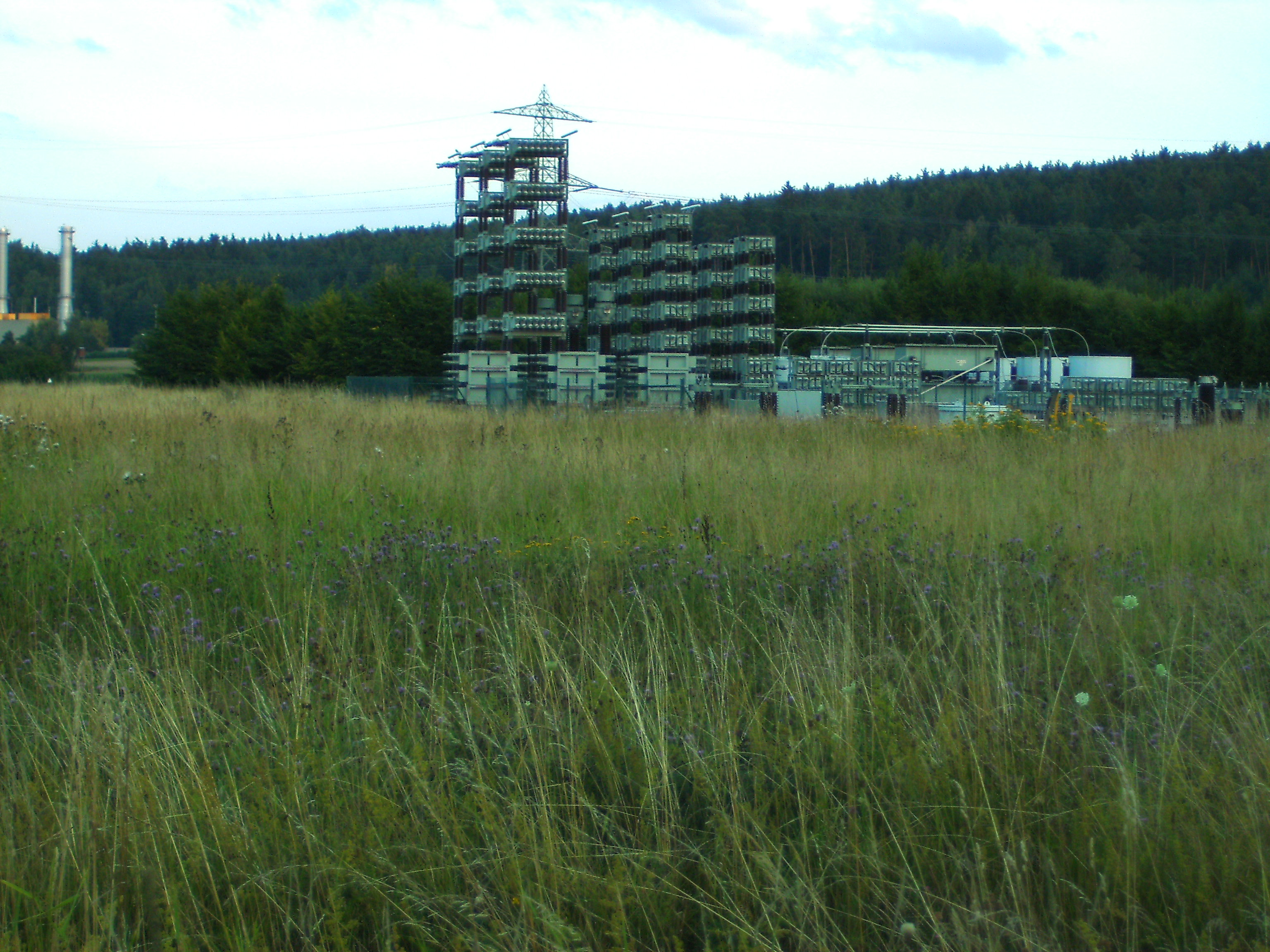
The only remaining AC filter of GKK Etzenricht

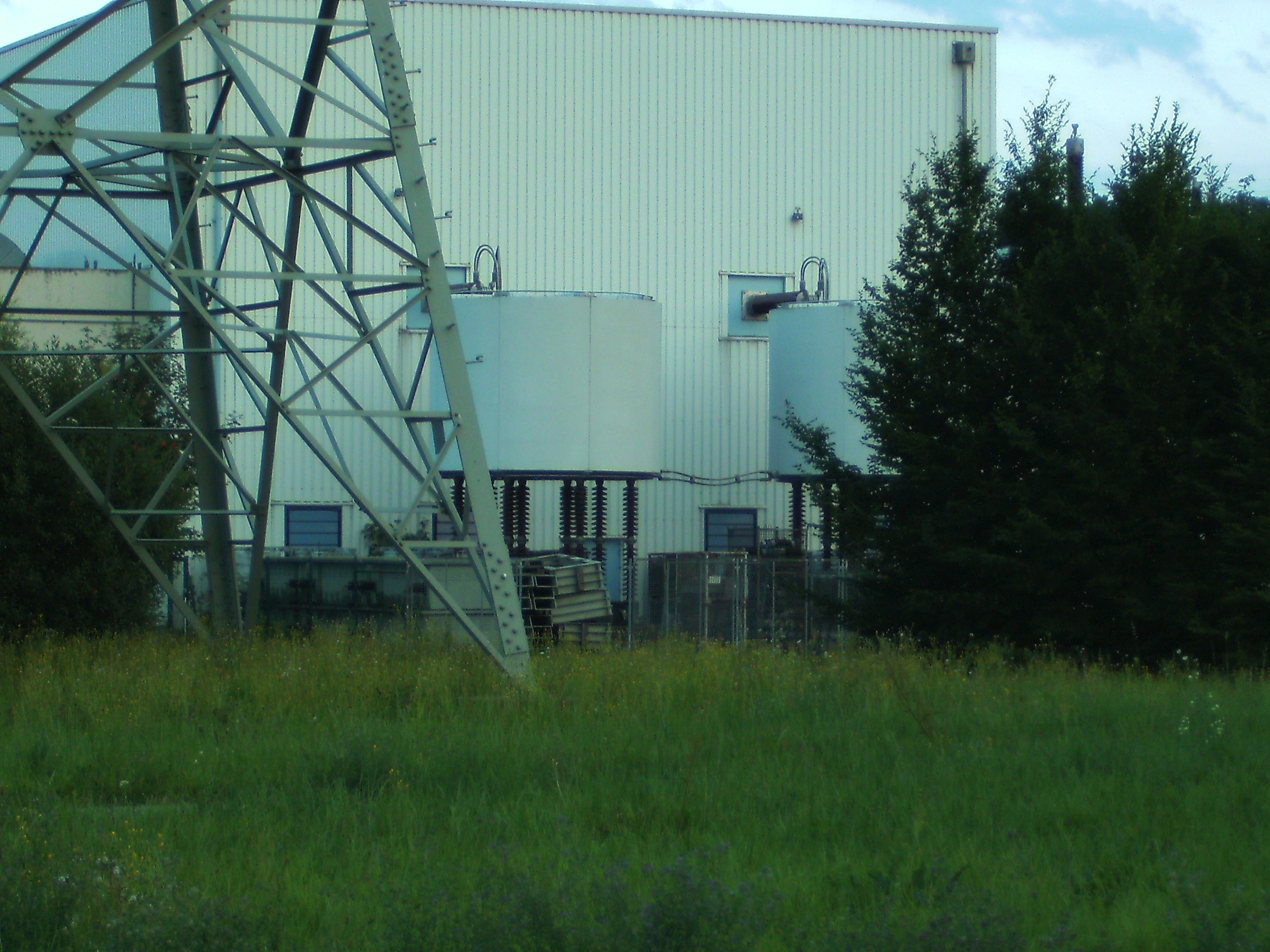
Smoothing reactors of GKK Etzenricht

=== Pictures of June 2009 ===
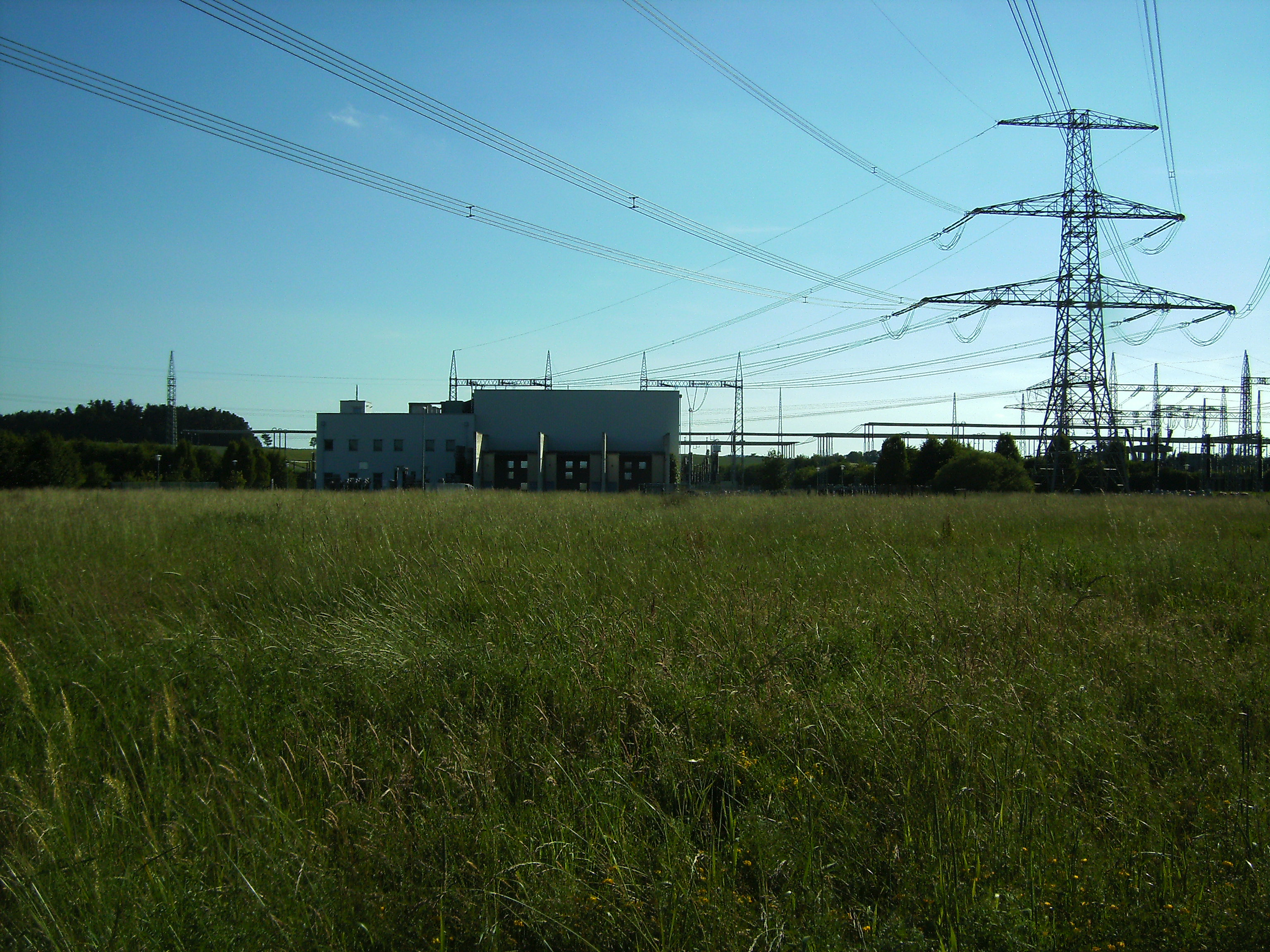
Valve hall of GKK Etzenricht with empty transformer bays facing North. The area in front of the hall is still fenced in. On October 3, 2010 there will be an ACDC-concert for celebrating the 20th anniversary of German reunification.

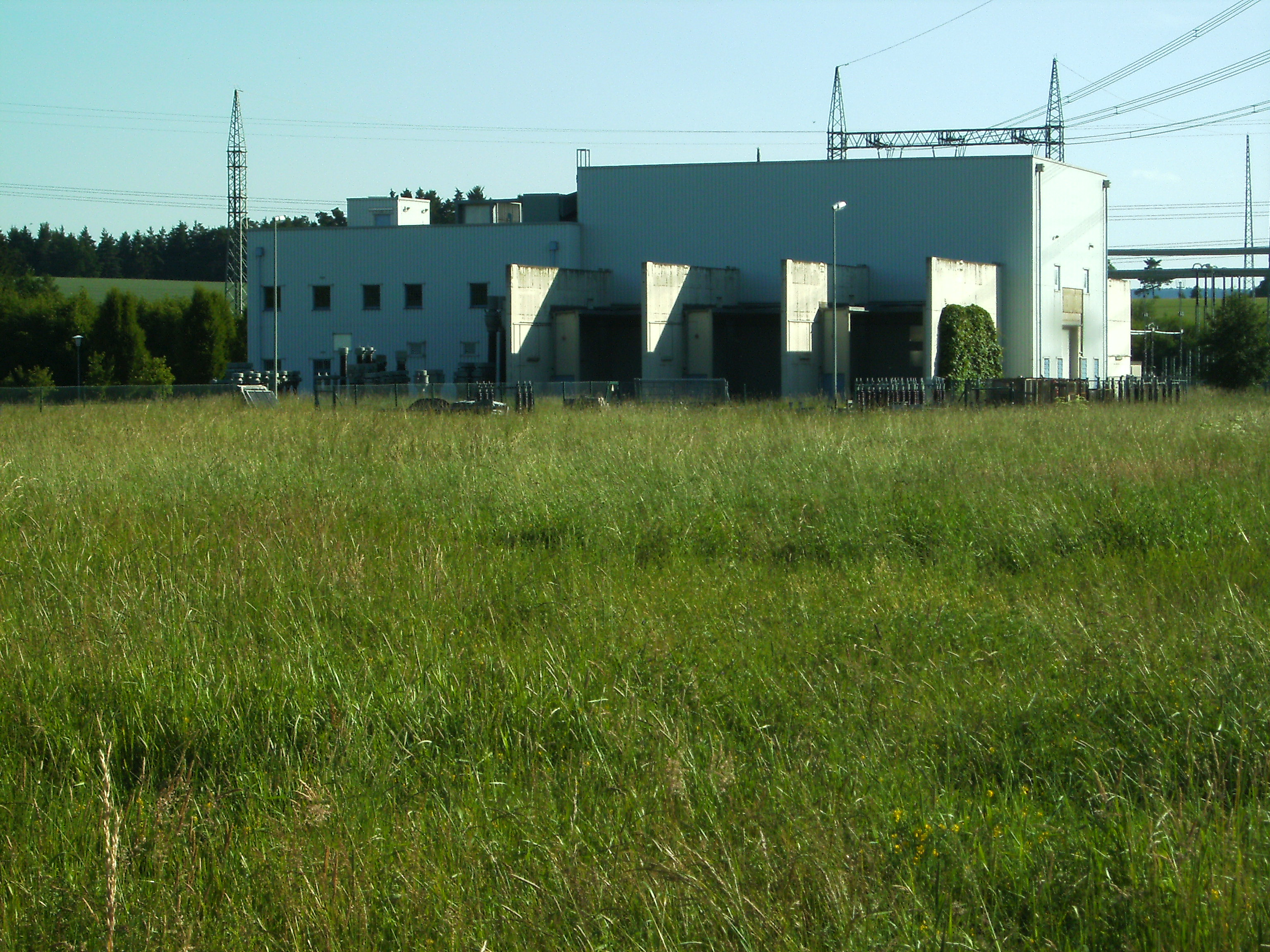
Close view at valve hall with empty transformer bays. Also the smoothing reactors are gone

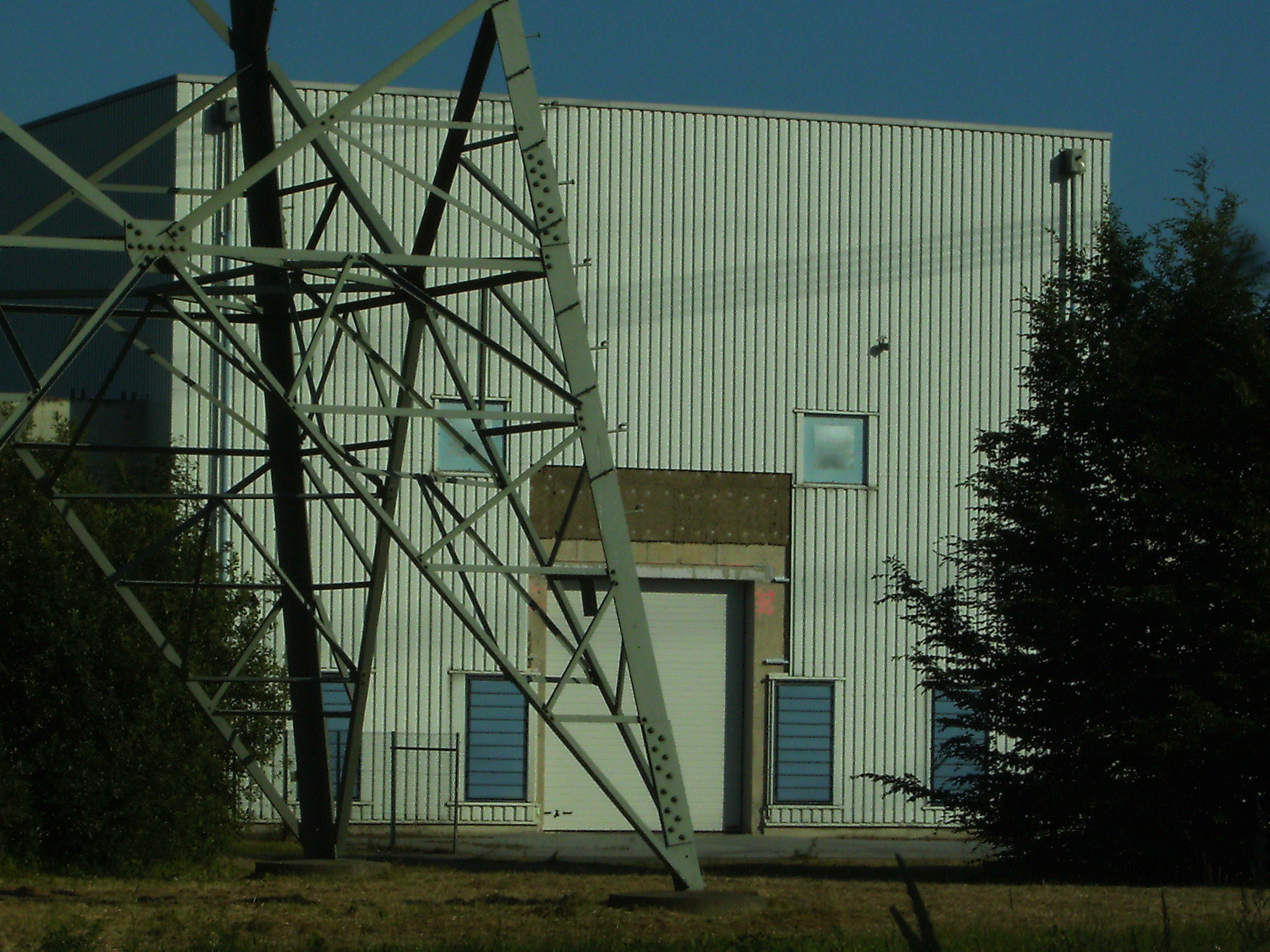
Wall of valve hall where once the smoothing reactors were. The door was installed after removal of smoothing reactors.

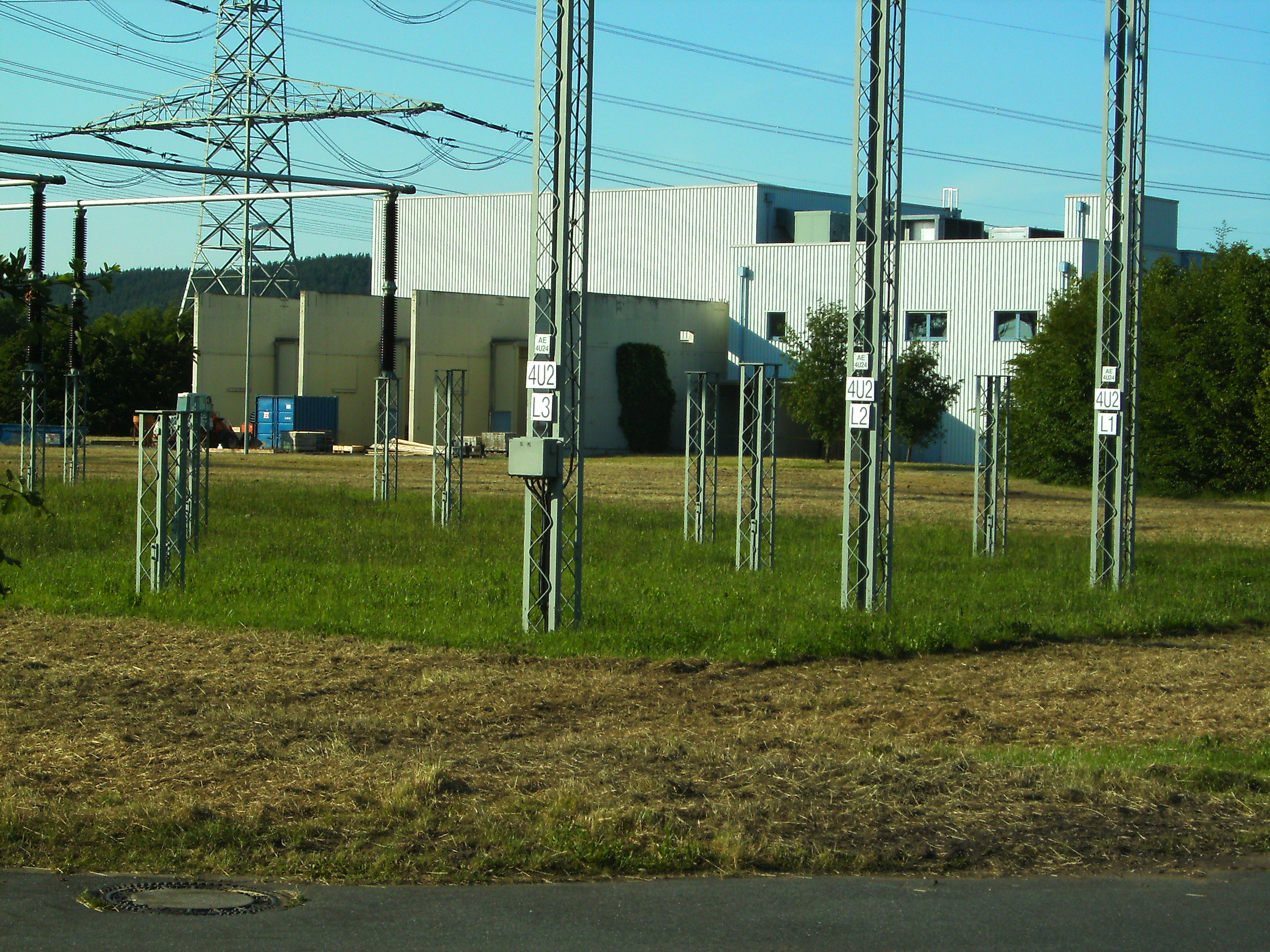
Also the transformer bays on the south side are empty

== Power transmission line to the Czech Republic ==
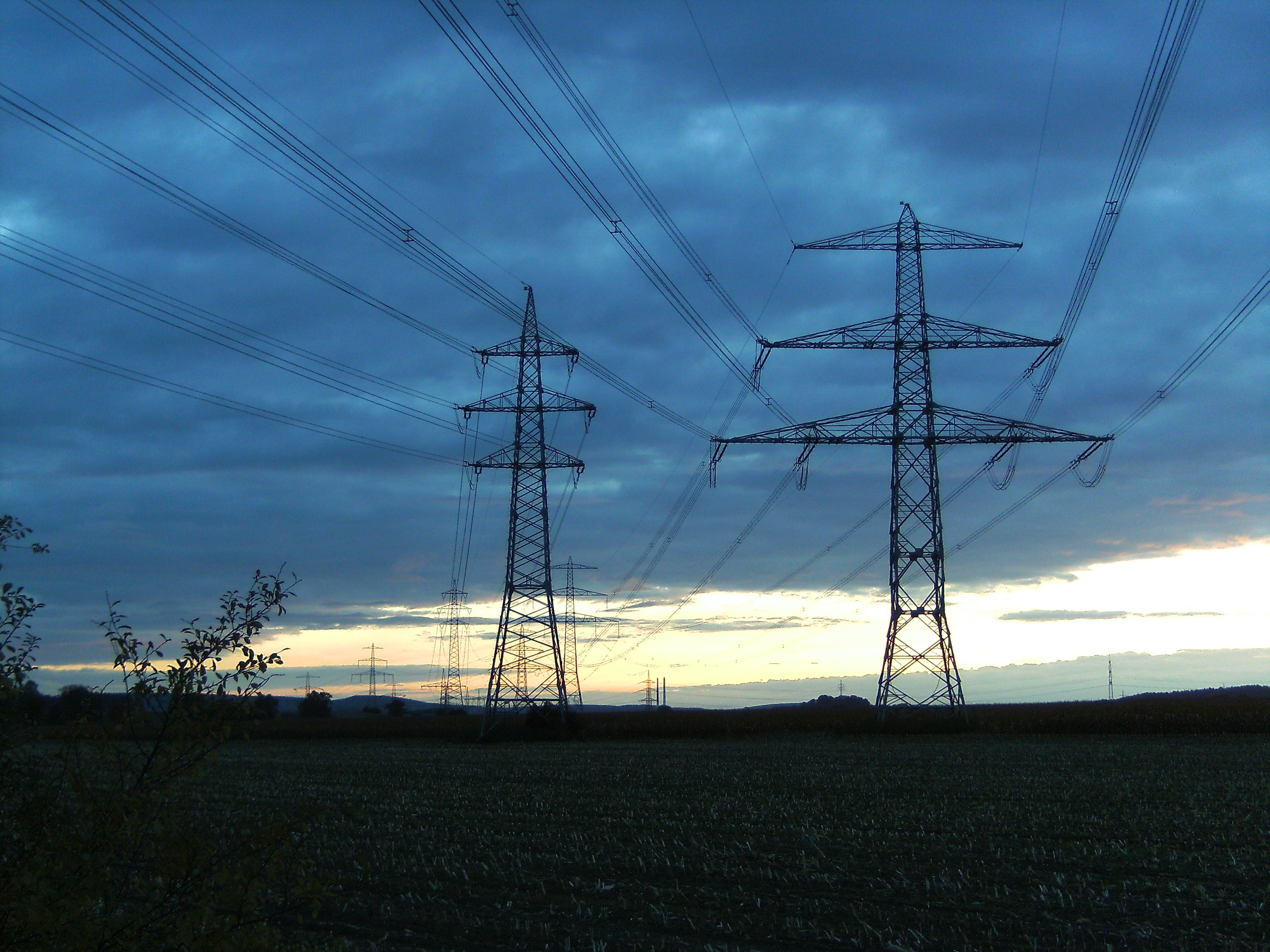
380 kV-Powerline from Etzenricht (Germany) to Hradec (Czech) between Etzenricht and Weiden (right). On the left, the 110 kV-powerline from Etzenricht to Weiden

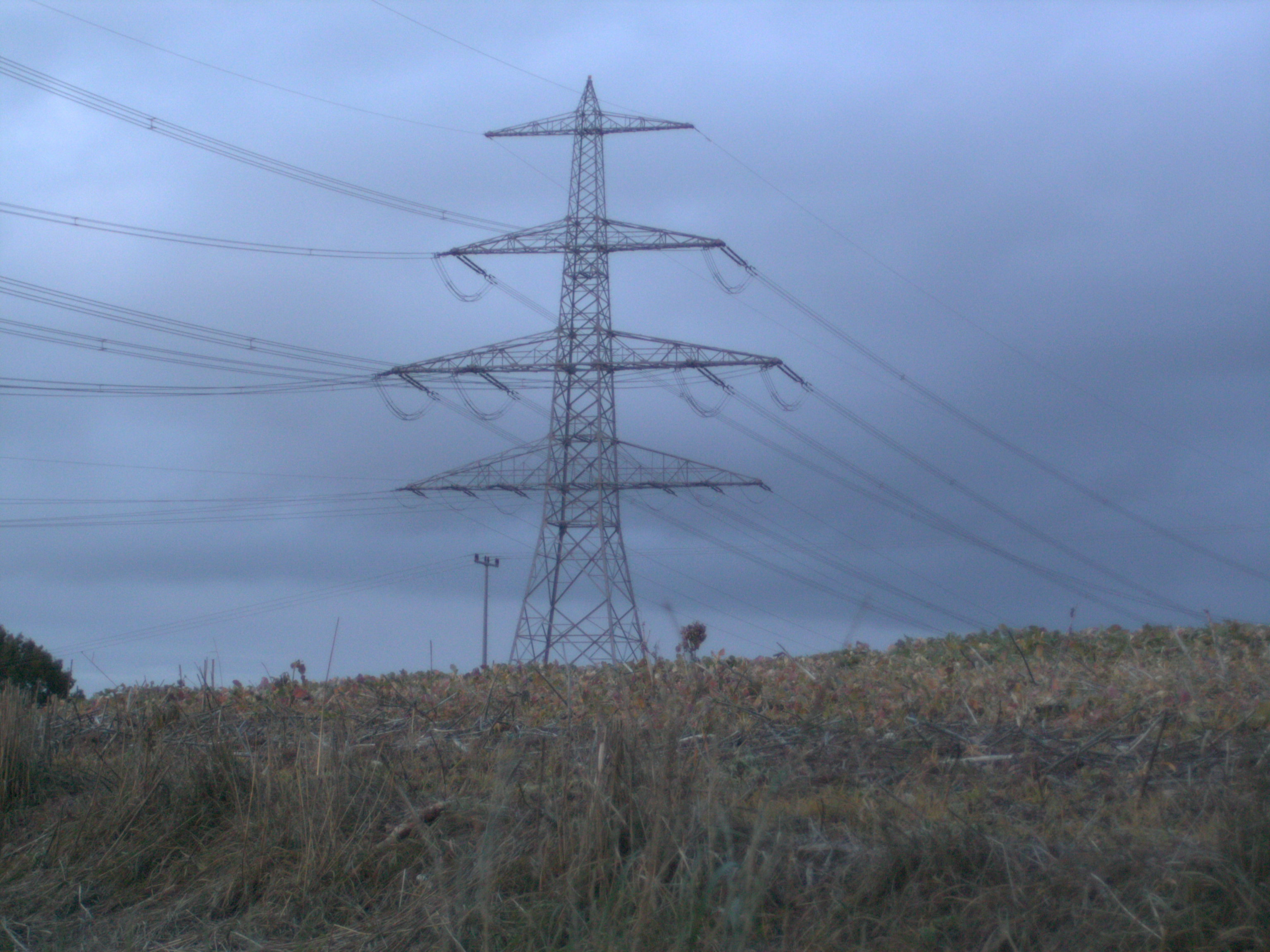
First pylon of 380 kV-powerline Etzenricht (Germany) - Hradec (Czech) after Weiden 110 kV-substation also carrying the 110 kV-circuits of powerline between Weiden and Vohenstrauss

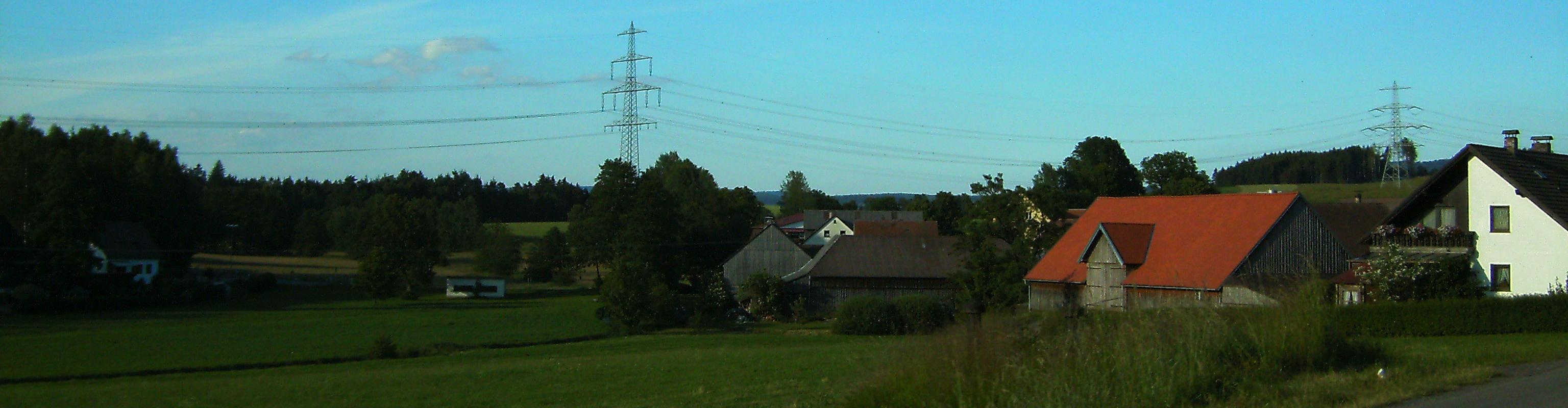
Section with 4 circuits between Weiden and Vohenstrauss

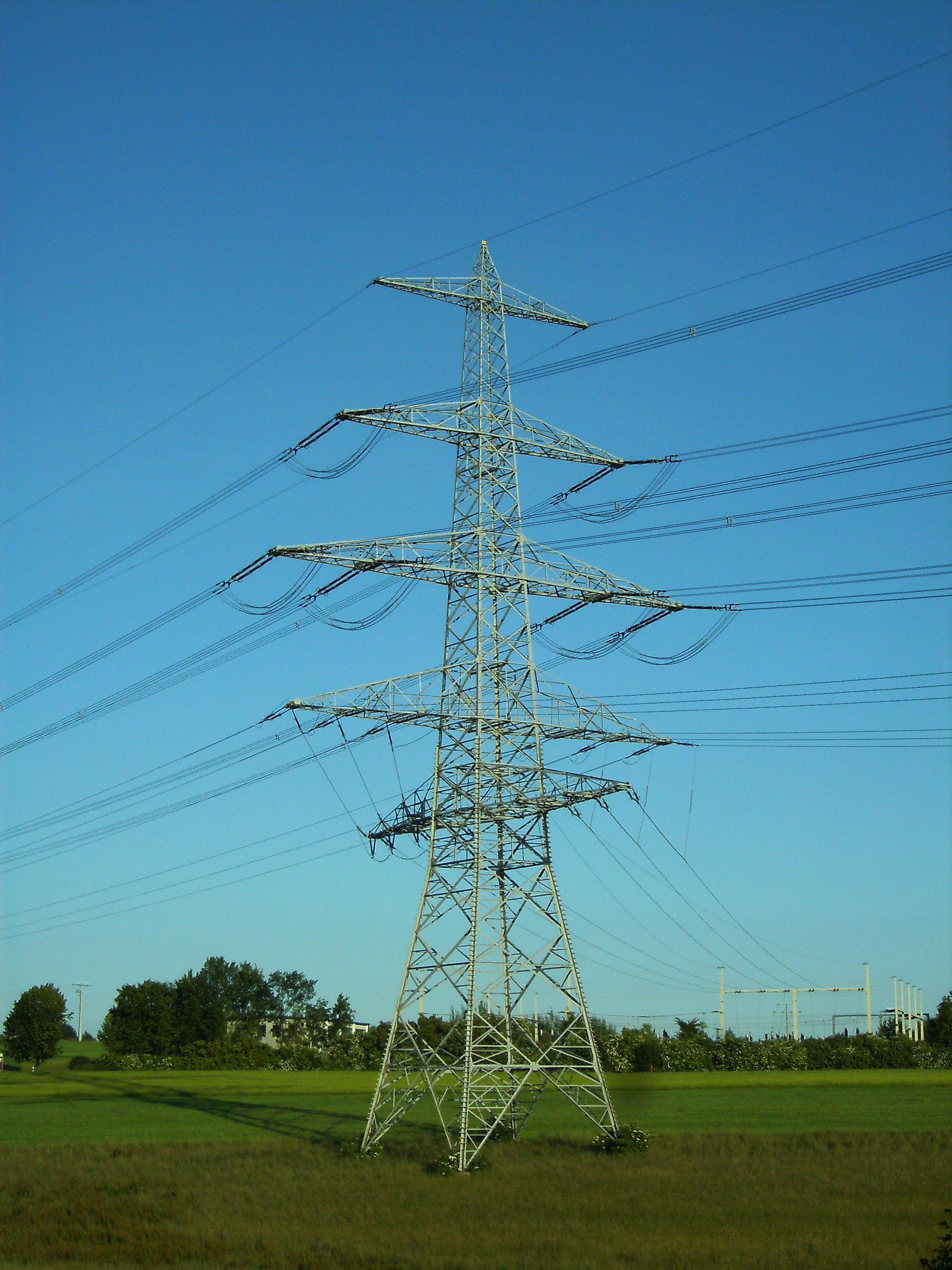
Branch pylon Vohenstrauss

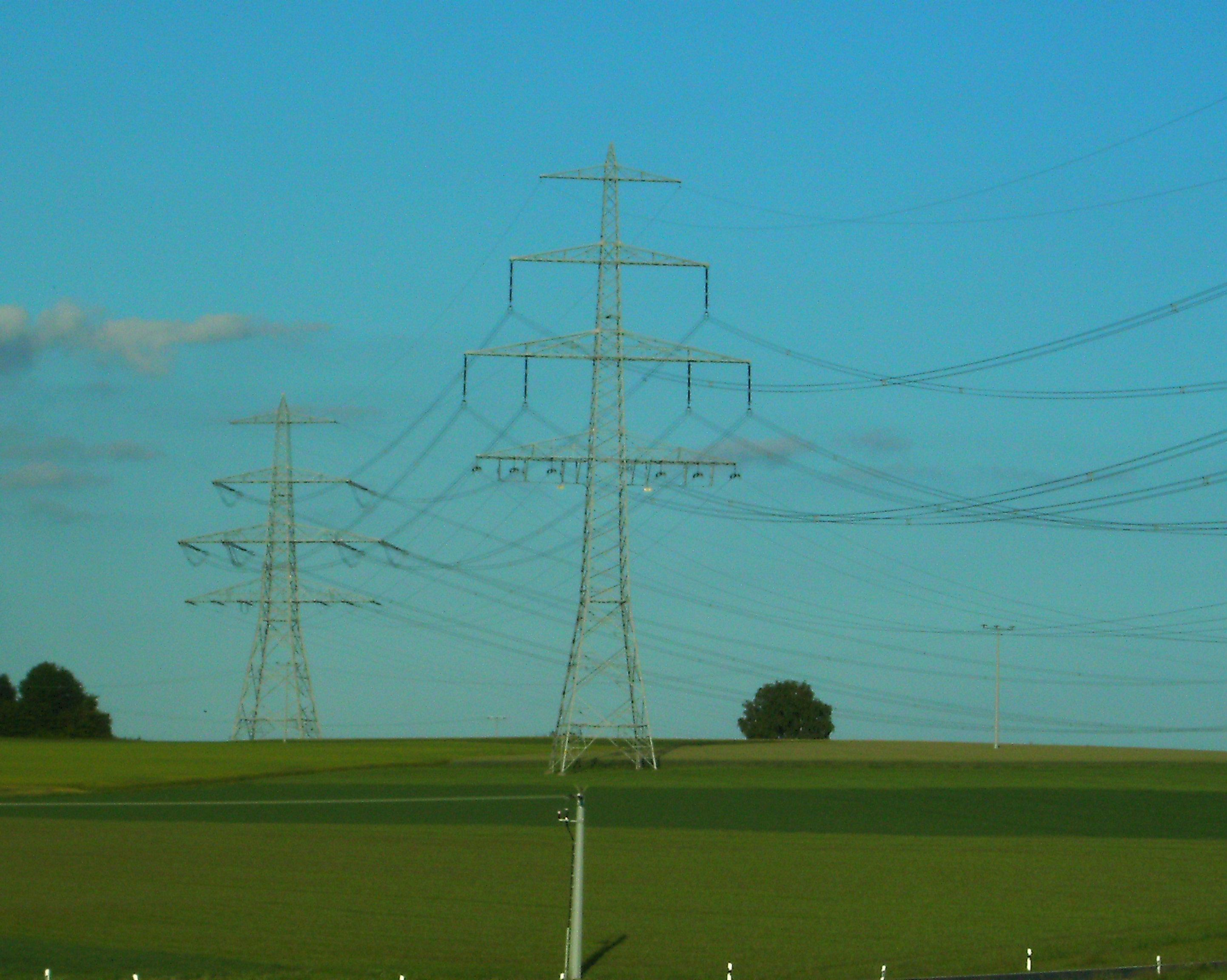
Feeding of 30 kV-circuits of powerline Vohenstrauss-Eslarn into conductors on lowest crossbar at next pylon

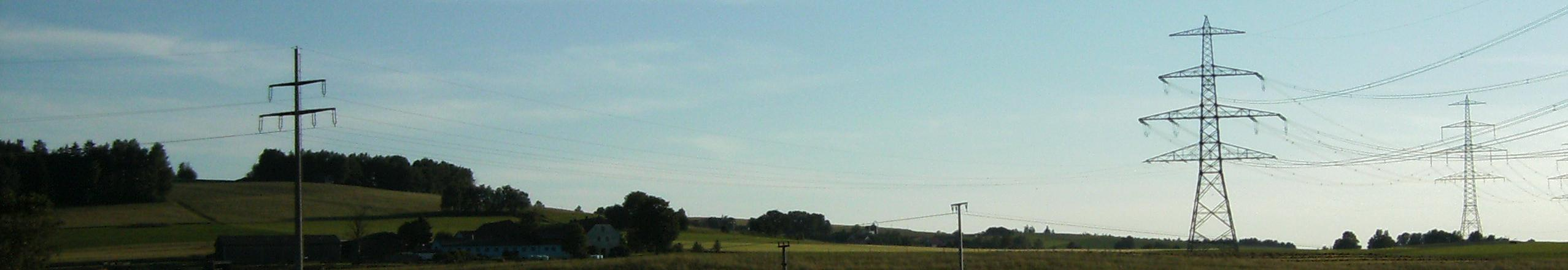
The 30 kV-line to Eslarn leaves the right-of-way of 380kV-line to Czech near Riedlhof

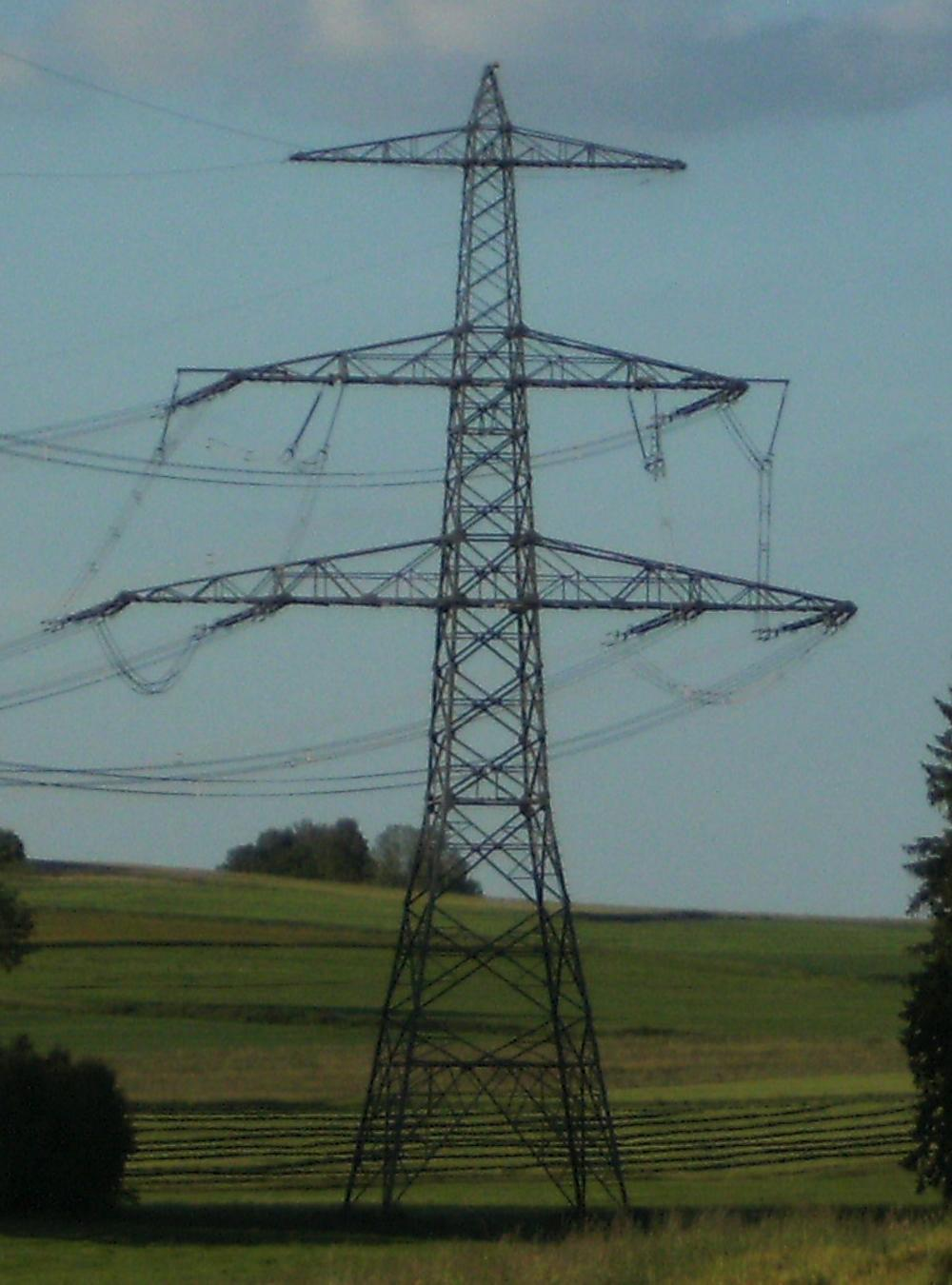
Twisting pylon on the section Riedlhof - Bavarian/Czech-border

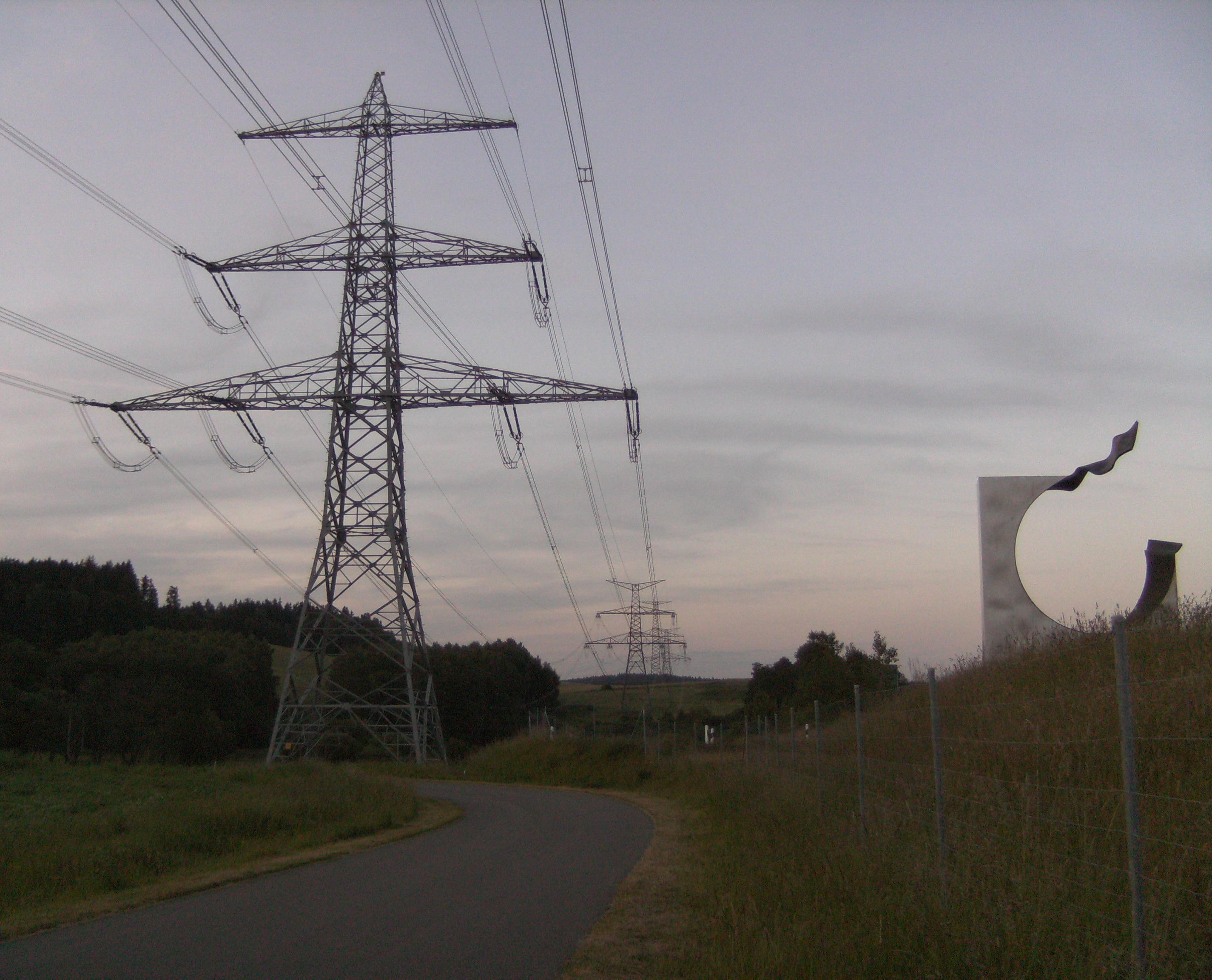
The line crosses the international border between Bavaria and Czech near Waidhaus. The pylon in the foreground stands in Bavaria the others are in Czech

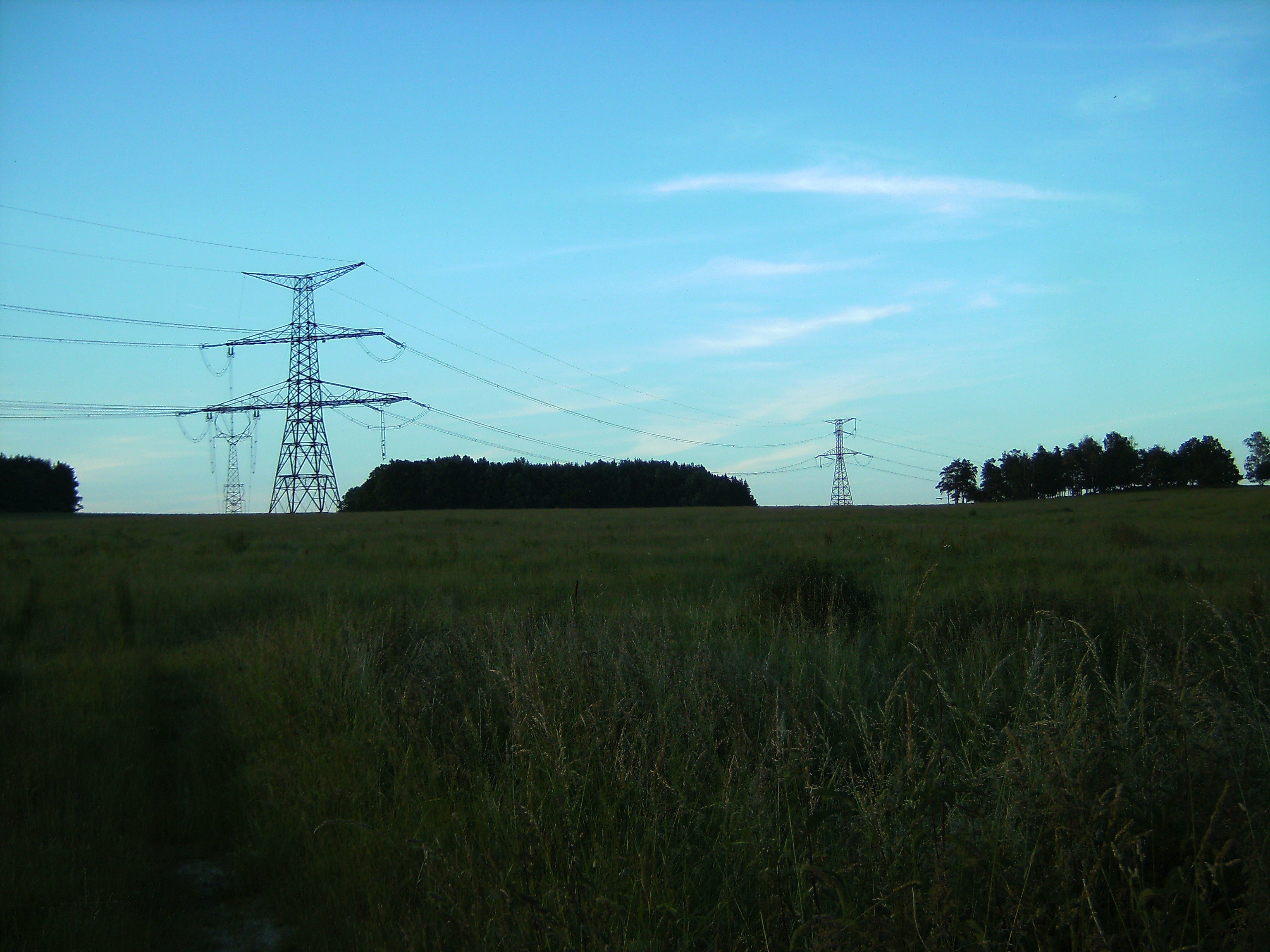
Splitting the lines to Hradec (left) and Prestice (right) near Stráž u Tachova

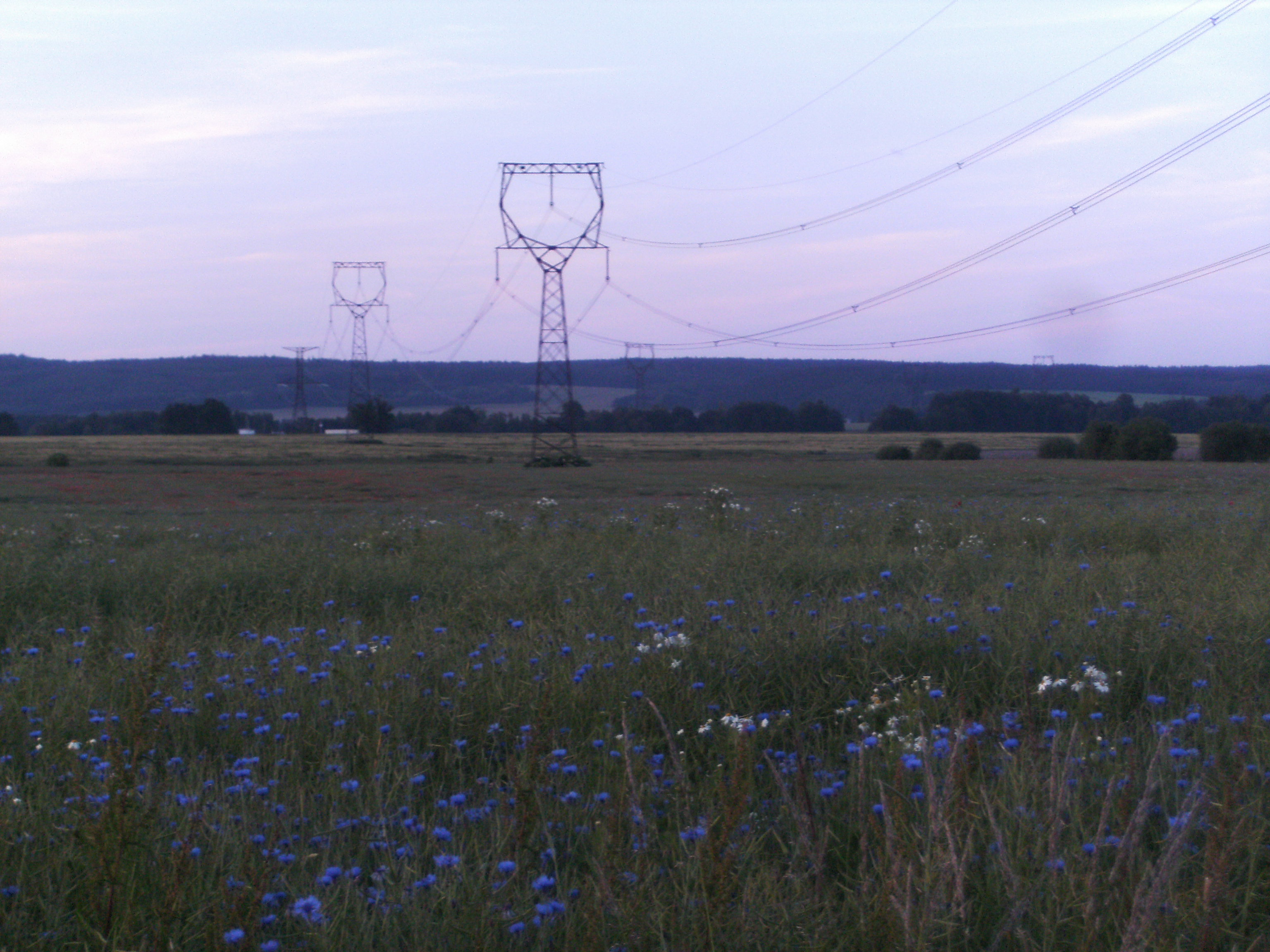
The line Etzenricht-Hradec on delta-type pylons on the remaining 97.5 kilometres to Hradec substation

Etzenricht-Hradec powerline
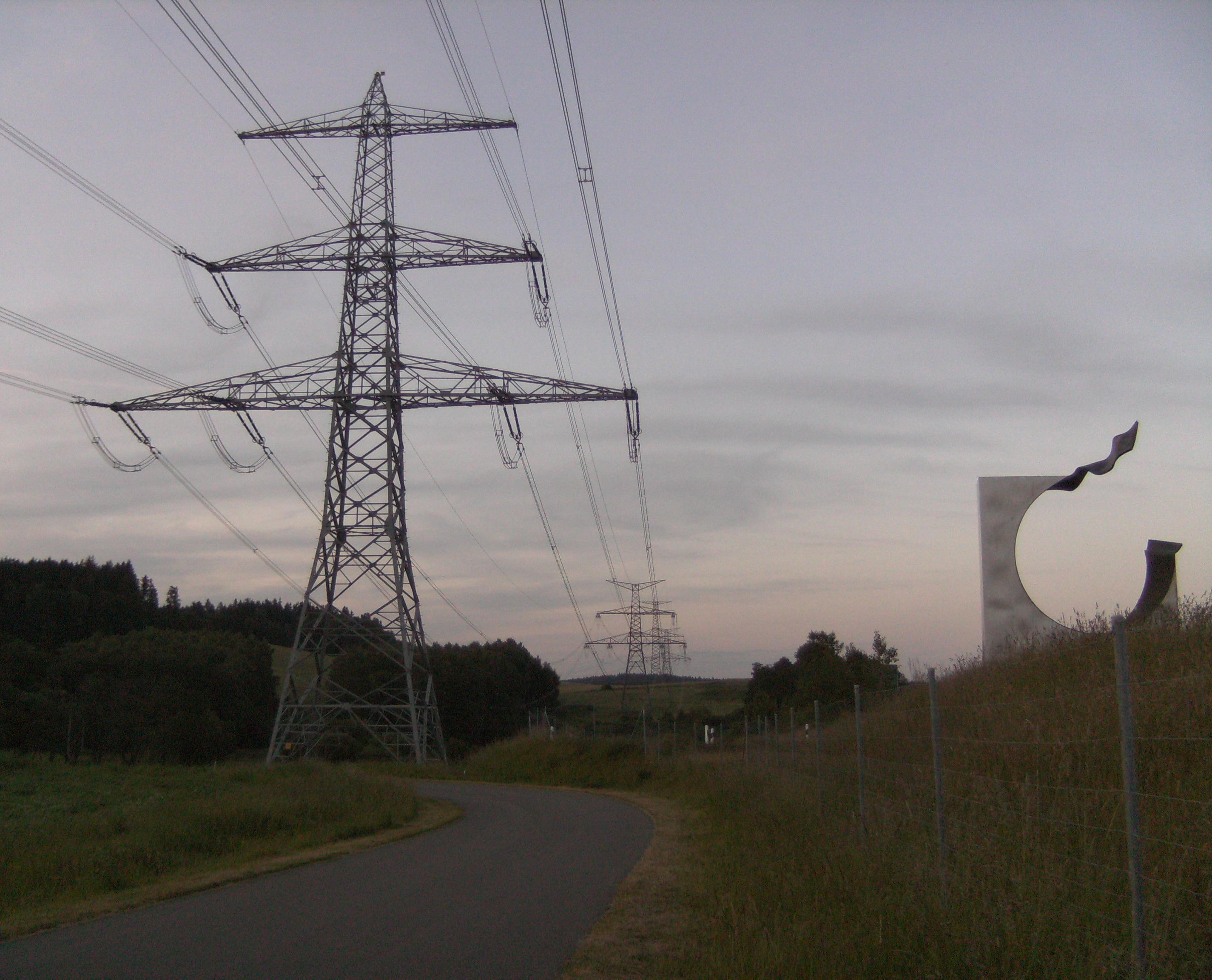

Location
- Country: Germany, Czech
- Coordinates: 49°37′52″N 12°06′57″E; 49°38′56″N 12°10′34″E; 49°38′28″N 12°19′22″E; 49°36′07″N 12°27′42″E; 49°38′33″N 12°31′13″E; 49°40′49″N 12°47′05″E; 50°20′47″N 13°19′36″E
- General direction: west–east; north-south
- From: Etzenricht, Germany
- Passes through: Border of Czech
- To: Hradec, Czech

Construction information
- Construction started: 1992
- Commissioned: 1993

Technical information
- Type: Overhead transmission line
- Current type: HVAC
- Total length: 163 km (101 mi)
- No. of towers: 471
- Capacity: 1,316 MW
- AC voltage: 380 kV
- No. of circuits: 1 ( 1 Etzenricht-Prestice)

Etzenricht-Prestice powerline
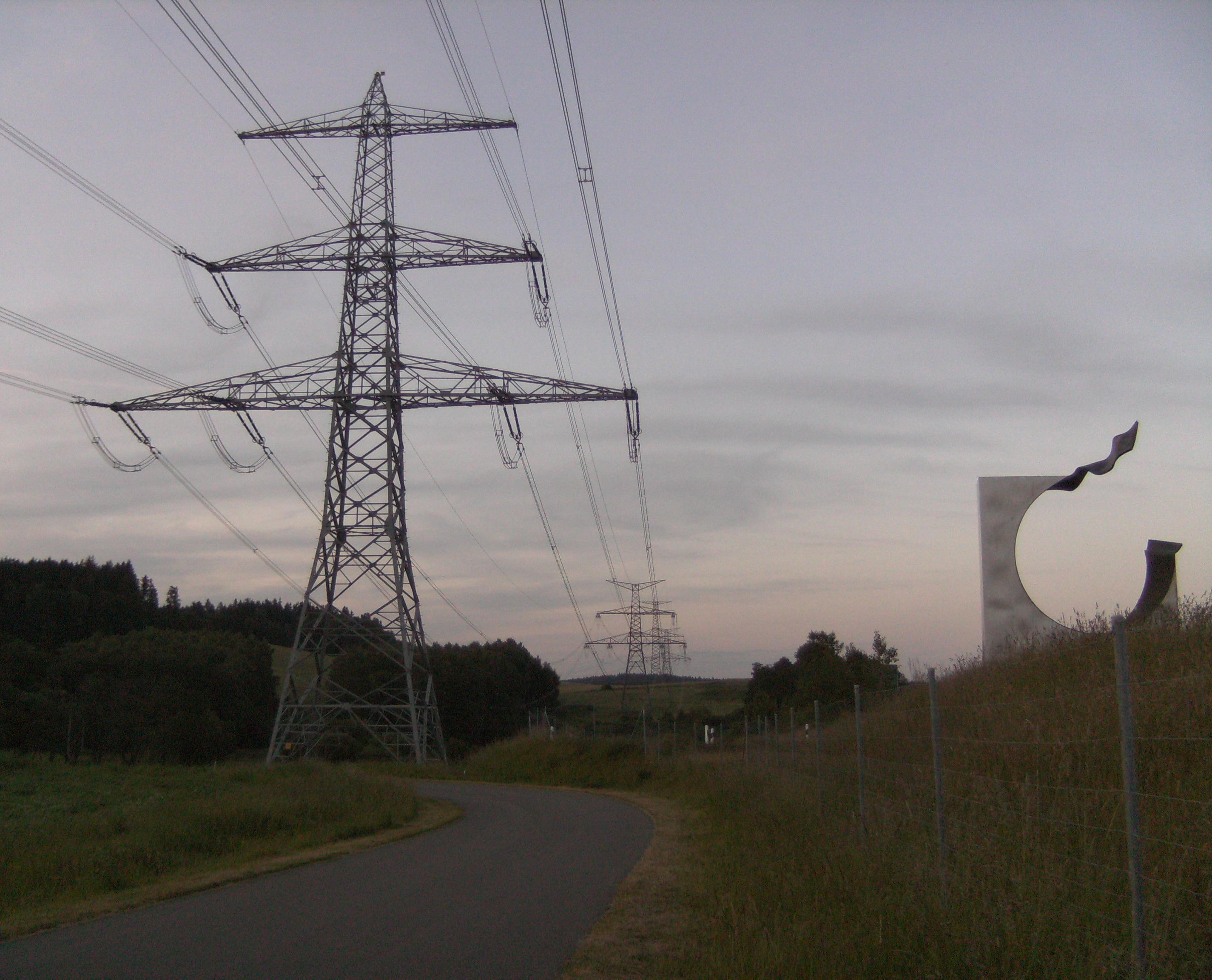

Location
- Country: Germany, Czech
- Coordinates: 49°37′52″N 12°06′57″E; 49°38′56″N 12°10′34″E; 49°38′28″N 12°19′22″E; 49°36′07″N 12°27′42″E; 49°38′33″N 12°31′13″E; 49°40′49″N 12°47′05″E; 49°35′22″N 13°20′06″E
- General direction: west–east
- From: Etzenricht, Germany
- Passes through: Border of Czech
- To: Prestice, Czech

Construction information
- Construction started: 1997
- Commissioned: 1997

Technical information
- Type: Overhead transmission line
- Current type: HVAC
- Total length: 110 km (68 mi)
- No. of towers: 300
- Capacity: 1,579 MW
- AC voltage: 380 kV
- No. of circuits: 1

GKK Etzenricht was used in connection with the power transmission line between Germany and the Czech Republic. The single-circuit 380kV power transmission link runs from the (Ex) GKK Etzenricht to the Czech substations at Hradec u Kadaně. In 1997 a second single-circuit 380 kV-interconnection from Etzenricht to Přeštice substation was realized. Its conductors, which are of the same type as that used for the line to Hradec, are between Etzenricht and Straz installed on the same pylons. For overvoltage protection the whole powerline is equipped with two ground conductors, which are installed on a separate crossbar on the top of the pylons. One conductor contains a fiber optic cable for data transmission.

The link from Etzenricht to Hradec has a maximum power transmission capacity of 1639 MW at an operating voltage of 380 kV. However it is limited by substation equipment to 1316 MW. On the German section of the line the conductors are bundles of four ropes consisting of steel and aluminum. Each conductor has a cross section of 340 mm² aluminum and 30 mm² steel. Between Weiden and Etzenricht this line is installed on 14 pylons of the "Danube type". One of these pylons was built after the shutdown of the GKK, in order to run the line directly - past the static inverter hall - into the switchyard of the Etzenricht substation. By this the length of the German section of the line grow by 180 metres to 33.8 kilometres. Except of the first pylon, these pylons were used before 1992 for the 110 kV-powerline from Etzenricht to Weiden. In 1992 this line was rebuilt on pylons running parallel to the old 110 kV-powerline to Weiden, whose pylons were equipped with a third crossbar for the ground conductors and with the 380 kV-conductors for the line to Czech.

The section between Weiden/Oberpfalz and Eslarn consists of 60 pylons with a fourth crossbar under the crossbars for the 380 kV conductors in order to carry the two 110 kV circuits of the powerline Weiden/Oberpfalz - Vohenstrauss and the two 30 kV-circuits for the powerline between Vohenstrauss and Eslarn. This was necessary because, due to environmental protection, only one right of way was available. Therefore, the circuits of these lines, which existed in 1992 already since several years, had to be installed on the pylons of the powerline with the 380 kV-circuits to the Czech Republic. In Vohenstrauss the 110 kV-circuits run to the local substation, which is situated close to the right of way of the powerline to the Czech Republic.

Behind Vohenstrauss on the lowest crossbar the circuits of the 30 kV-line Vohenstrauss-Eslarn are installed. For a future upgrade of this line to 110 kV, the conductors of this line are mounted on insulators for 110 kV on the pylons. Near Riedlhof this line leaves the track of the line to Czech and runs on concrete pylons to Eslarn substation. From Riedlhof the 380 kV-line to the Czech Republic runs on 15 pylons of "Danube type" to the border between Germany and the Czech Republic. The border is crossed close north of the border crossing of the motorway A6 near Furth in Forest.

After the border the construction type of pylon does not change, but their design and the type of conductors. In the Czech Republic the line uses conductors, which are bundles of 3 conductors with a cross section of 450 mm² aluminum and 50 mm² steel. 31.5 kilometers behind the frontier near Straz the line splits off in two 380 kV-lines with a single circuit. One of these lines is the 97.5 kilometres (60.6 mi) long line section to Hradec in Northern Bohemia and the other is the line to Přeštice, which was built in 1997. Both lines are installed on Delta type pylons.

One feature that sets it apart from other similar stations is that the powerline to Hradec substation is implemented on its last section on the area of Hradec substation, between the termination portal and the busbar as underground cable.

== Directional Radio Tower ==
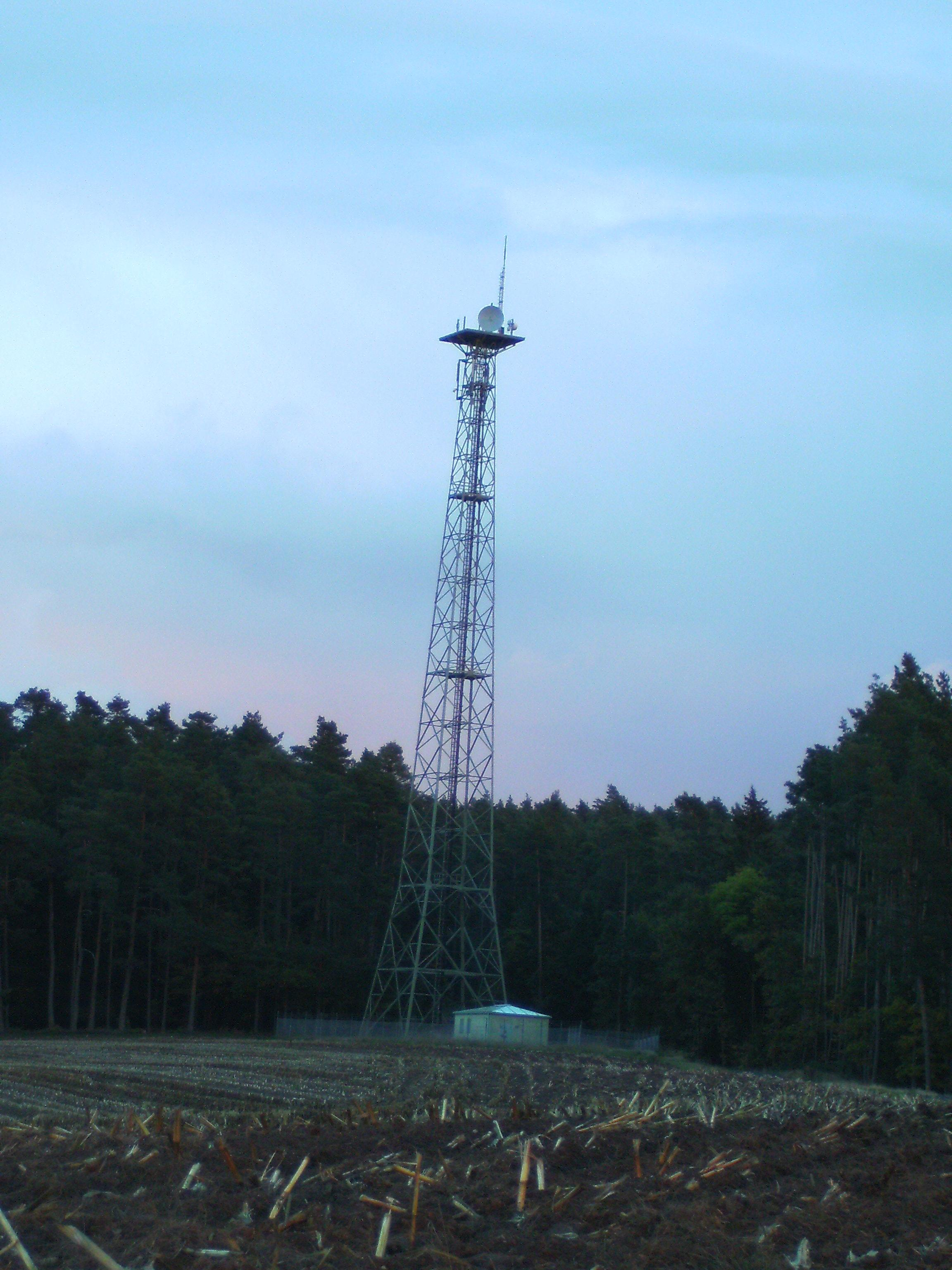
55 metres tall lattice tower south of Etzenricht substation used for directional radio links by E.ON

South of the facility on a hill at 49°37'28" N and 12°6'55" E there is a 55 meters tall free-standing lattice tower, which was built in 1973. It is used for directional radio links for remote controlling Etzenricht substation and GKK Etzenricht, which are both not permanently manned.

== Natural gas compressor station ==
Southwest of the facility at 49°37'29" N and 12°7'33" E there is a compressor station for natural gas owned by MEGAL.

== Bibliography ==
- Sonderdruck aus Elektrizitätswirtschaft ( Nr. 4475),"Gleichstromkurzkupplung Etzenricht Strombrücke zwischen West und Ost" ((in German))
