= Etzenricht =

- Municipality
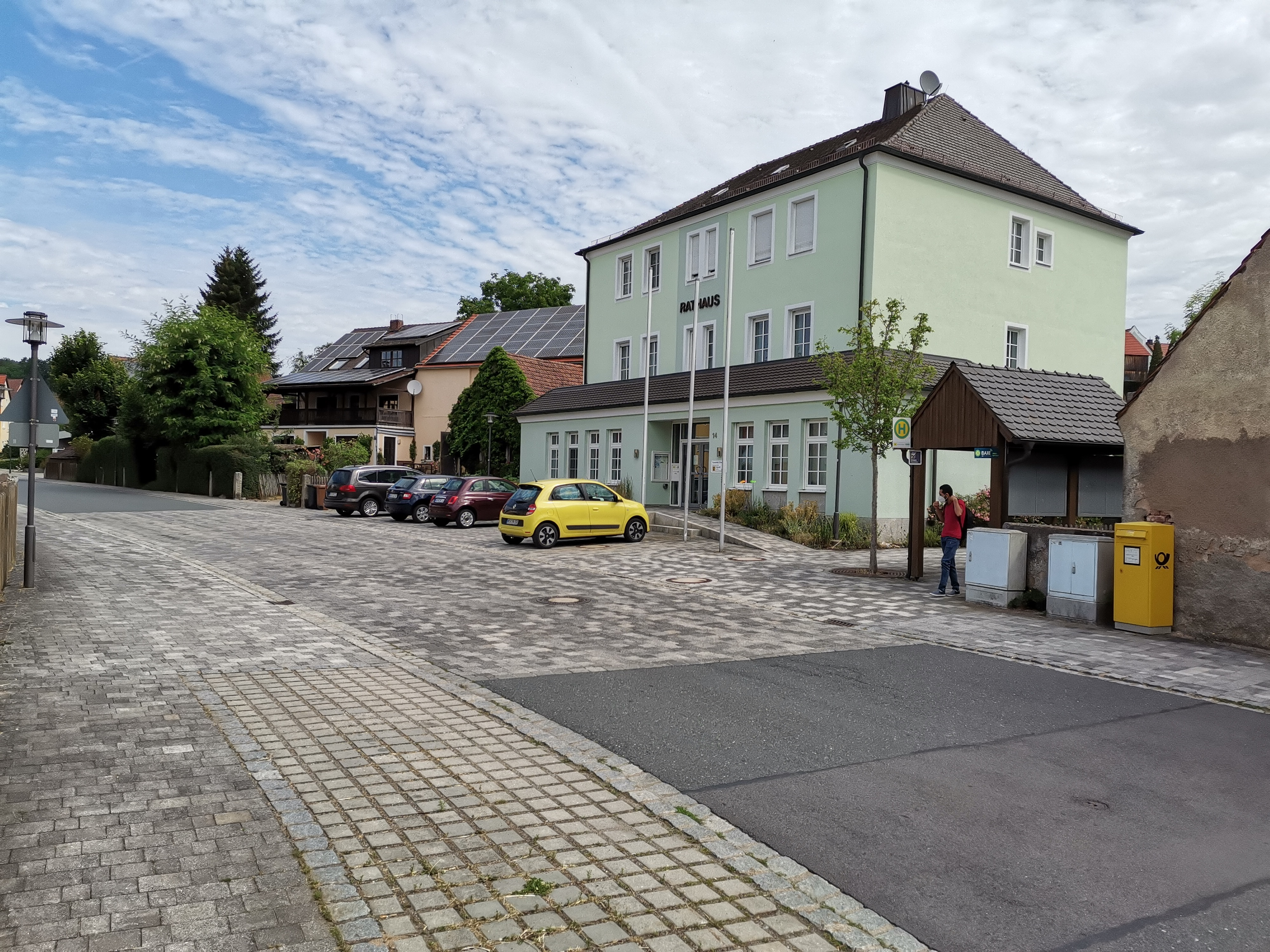

- Coat of arms

- Location of Etzenricht within Neustadt an der Waldnaab district
- Interactive map of Etzenricht
- Location within Germany Location within Bavaria
- Coordinates: 49°38′N 12°06′E
- Country: Germany
- State: Bavaria
- Admin. region: Oberpfalz
- District: Neustadt an der Waldnaab
- Municipal assoc.: Weiherhammer
- Subdivisions: 6 Ortsteile

Government
  - Mayor (2020–26): Martin Schregelmann (CSU)

Area
  - Total: 13.60 km^{2} (5.25 sq mi)
- Elevation: 429 m (1,407 ft)

Population (2025-12-31)
  - Total: 1,556
  - Density: 114.4/km^{2} (296.3/sq mi)
- Time zone: UTC+01:00 (CET)
  - Summer (DST): UTC+02:00 (CEST)
- Postal codes: 92694
- Dialling codes: 0961
- Vehicle registration: NEW
- Website: www.etzenricht.de

Etzenricht is a municipality in the Upper Palatinate, ca. 6 km (3.7 mi) southeast of Weiden in the district of Neustadt an der Waldnaab in Bavaria in Germany.

Etzenricht has 1,532 inhabitants (Dec. 2020) and various small industries. East of Etzenricht toward Rothenstadt is a transformer station of the E.ON AG with the GKK Etzenricht (described below) and a large compressor station for natural gas. Near Etzenricht are numerous fish-rich small waters, which can be used by anglers after obtaining a fishing license from the local fishery association.

== History ==
Etzenricht was mentioned for the first time in a written document in 1270. In 1283 it was mentioned in the Salbuch of Louis II ("Ludwig der Strenge" as "Aechswinreuth". The inhabitants of Etzenricht lived at that time on honey production and agriculture. The Reformer Jan Huss visited Etzenricht in 1414, on his way to the council of Konstanz. During the war from 1618 to 1648 Etzenricht was destroyed in 1631. In 1875, a railway was built and the town got its own railway station in 1877. Until the completion of the Catholic Church in 1932, Evangelical and Catholic services in Etzenricht took place in the same church.

A transformer station of the Bayernwerk AG (now E.ON AG) was built near Etzenricht and was expanded several times in subsequent years. A HVDC back-to-back facility called GKK Etzenricht was installed there from 1991 to 1993, which made the name of the municipality Etzenricht supraregionally popular.
