= Natural regions of the Black Forest =

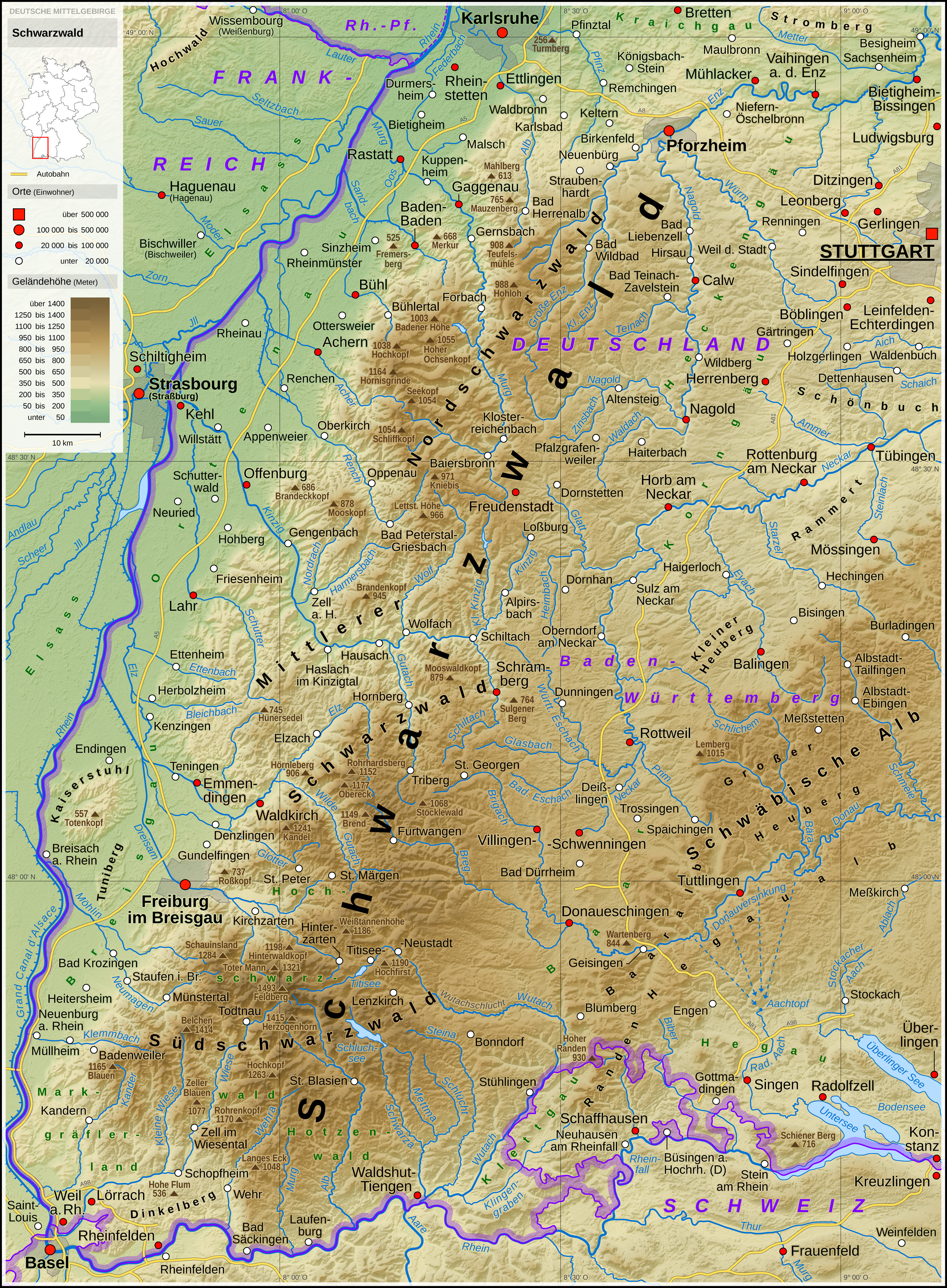
Black Forest

The Black Forest is categorised as a natural region of the 3rd level and is part of the South German Scarplands, where it forms the basement and escarpments of Bunter sandstone along with the major region of Odenwald, Spessart and South Rhön. According to the classification in the Handbook of the Natural Region Divisions of Germany and its successor publications in the former Bundesanstalt für Landeskunde, which are also used by the relevant Baden-Württemberg state department (LUBW), it is given the two-digit number 15; the Federal Agency for Nature Conservation (BfN), in its internal numbering system, designates it as D54.
