= Central Brandenburg Plateaux and Lowlands =

Coordinates: 52°18′30″N 12°57′0″E

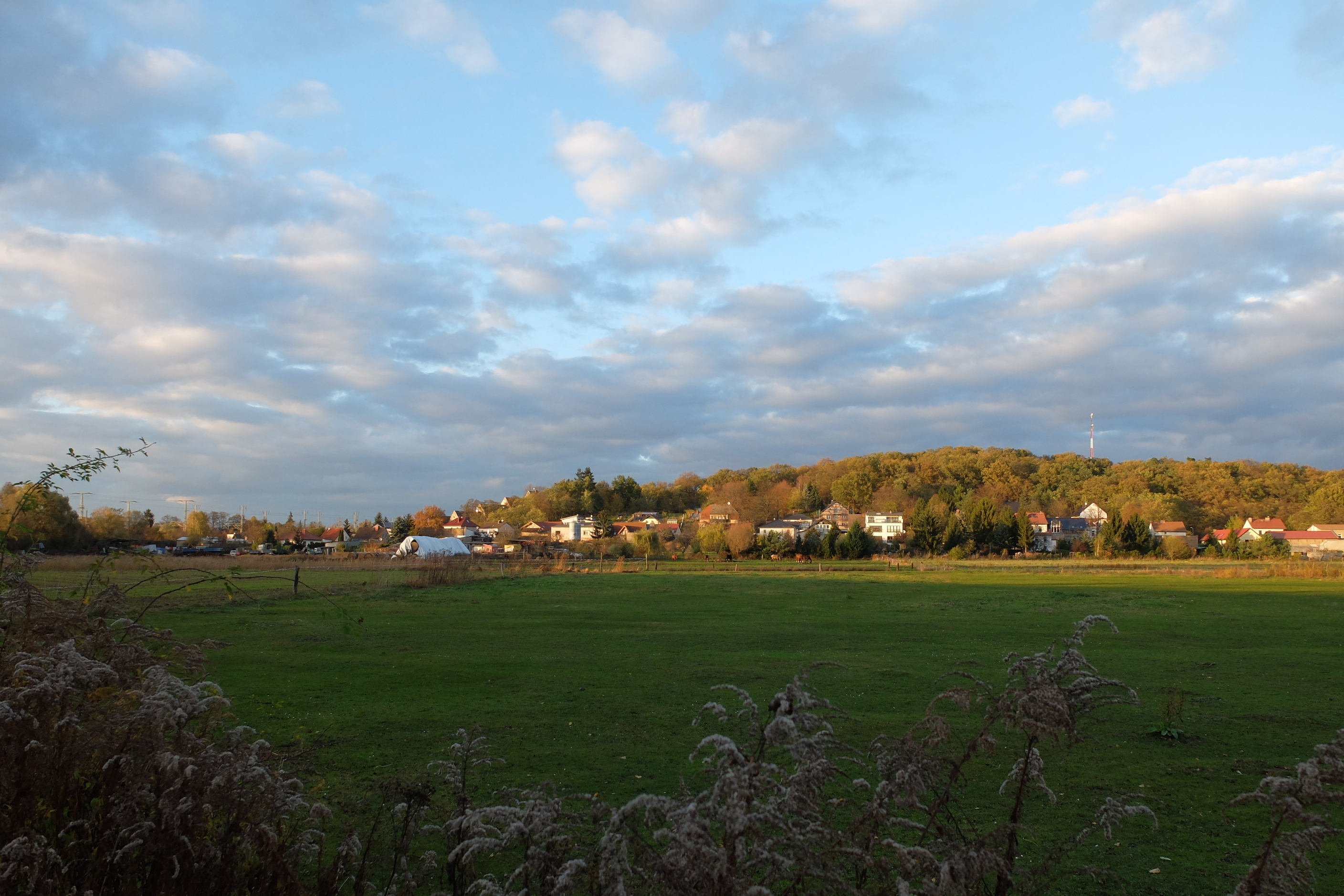
- Landscape near Golm Landscape near Golm
- Native name: Mittelbrandenburgische Platten und Niederungen
- Area: 4,115.8 km²
- Classification: Handbook of Natural Region Divisions of Germany
- Level 1 Region: North German Plain
- Level 2 Region: Central North German Plain
- Level 3 Region: 76–89 → East German Plateaux and Heathland
- Natural region: 81 → Central Brandenburg Plateaux and Lowlands
- Highest point: Wietkiekenberg (124.7 m)
- State(s): Brandenburg, Saxony-Anhalt, Berlin
- Country: Germany

The Central Brandenburg Plateaux and Lowlands (German: Mittelbrandenburgische Platten und Niederungen) form a natural region in the German state of Brandenburg and in parts of southwest Berlin and the east of Saxony-Anhalt. They are major unit group 81 in the system of natural regions of Germany and part of the East German Plateaux and Heathlands. The Brandenburg portion of the Central Brandenburg Plateaux and Lowlands is largely coincident with the natural region designated as the Central March (Mittlere Mark) in the structural atlas of the state of Brandenburg.

== Location ==
The Central Brandenburg Plateaux and Lowlands are part of the North German Plain. Neighbouring landscapes are the Luchland to the north, the East Brandenburg Heath and Lake District to the east, the Spreewald and the Lusatian Basin and Heathland to the southeast, the Fläming to the south and the Elbe Valley to the west.

== Description ==
Almost all the landscape elements that originated during the Weichselian Glaciation in the state of Brandenburg are united within the Central Brandenburg Plateaux and Lowlands. These are dominated by ground moraine plateaux of varying extent alternating with wide lowlands. Adjacent to the Nauen and Teltow ground moraine plateaux in the north are the lowlands of Havel, Nuthe and Notte. They are followed by the regions of the Karow Plateau, the Lehnin Land and the heaths of Beelitz and Luckenwald. In the far south a broad urstromtal, the Baruth Valley.

The highest points are found in the form of push moraines. The Wietkiekenberg reaches a height of 124.7 m, the Kleiner Ravensberg near Potsdam 114.2 m, the Götzer Berg 108.6 m. The entire natural region is drained by the Havel and its tributaries.

== Natural regions ==
The Central Brandenburg Plateaux and Lowlands are subdivided as follows:

- 81 Central Brandenburg Plateaux and Lowlands
  - 810 Nauen Plateau (595.0 km^{2})
  - 811 Teltow Plateau (675.9 km^{2})
  - 812 Brandenburg-Potsdamer Havelgebiet (513.0 km^{2})
  - 813 Lehnin Land (271.8 km^{2})
  - 814 Beelitzen Heath (225.0 km^{2})
  - 815 Nuthe-Notte Lowland (561.6 km^{2})
  - 816 Luckenwald Heath (319.5 km^{2})
  - 817 Baruth Urstromtal and Fiener Bruch (881.0 km^{2})
  - 818 Karow Plateau (73.0 km^{2})

== Literature ==
- Emil Meynen, Josef Schmithüsen et al. (eds.): Handbuch der naturräumlichen Gliederung Deutschlands. Bundesanstalt für Landeskunde, Remagen/Bad Godesberg 1953–1962 (8. Lieferung 1961). pp. 1129–1139, Author H. J. Franz.
- Eberhard Scholz (1962), Die naturräumliche Gliederung Brandenburgs (in German), Potsdam: Pädagogisches Bezirkskabinett, pp. 52 ff
