= Weser-Aller Plains and Geest =

Weser-Aller Plains and Geest Weser-Aller-Flachland
- Coordinates: 52°23′27″N 10°07′15″E
- State: Lower Saxony, Germany
- Primary natural region: North German Plain
- Secondary natural region: Central North German Plain
- Tertiary natural region: North German Geest

The Weser-Aller Plains and Geest (German: Weser-Aller-Flachland) is a natural regional unit of the North German Plain in Germany. It extends over most of the southern catchment of the Aller including the lower reaches of the Oker and Leine and is bounded in the west by the Middle Weser.

It is also bounded, from a natural region perspective, by the Stade Geest, the Luneburg Heath, the Wendland and the Altmark in the north; in the east by the Central German Black Earth Region (Mitteldeutsches Schwarzerdegebiet), in the south by the Northern Harz Foreland and Lower Saxon Börde and, in the west, by the Dümmer-Geest Lowland and Ems-Hunte Geest. In the BfN numbering scheme it is number D31.

== Natural regional allocation ==
In the system of natural regions of Germany the Weser-Aller Plains are a tertiary level major region and major unit group (Number 62, two-digit) within the North German Plain (primary level major region). They are split as into the following major units (fourth level regions, three-digits):

- 62 Weser-Aller Plains (D31)
  - 620 Verden Weser Valley
  - 621 Thedinghäusen Foregeest
  - 622 Hanoverian Moor Geest
  - 623 Burgdorf-Peine Geest
  - 624 East Brunswick Plain
  - 625 Drömling
  - 626 Upper Aller Valley
  - 627 Aller Valley Sand Plain
  - 628 Loccum Geest

== Literature ==
- Dickinson, Robert E. (1964). Germany: A regional and economic geography (2nd ed.). London: Methuen. p. 84.
