= Natural regions of Germany =

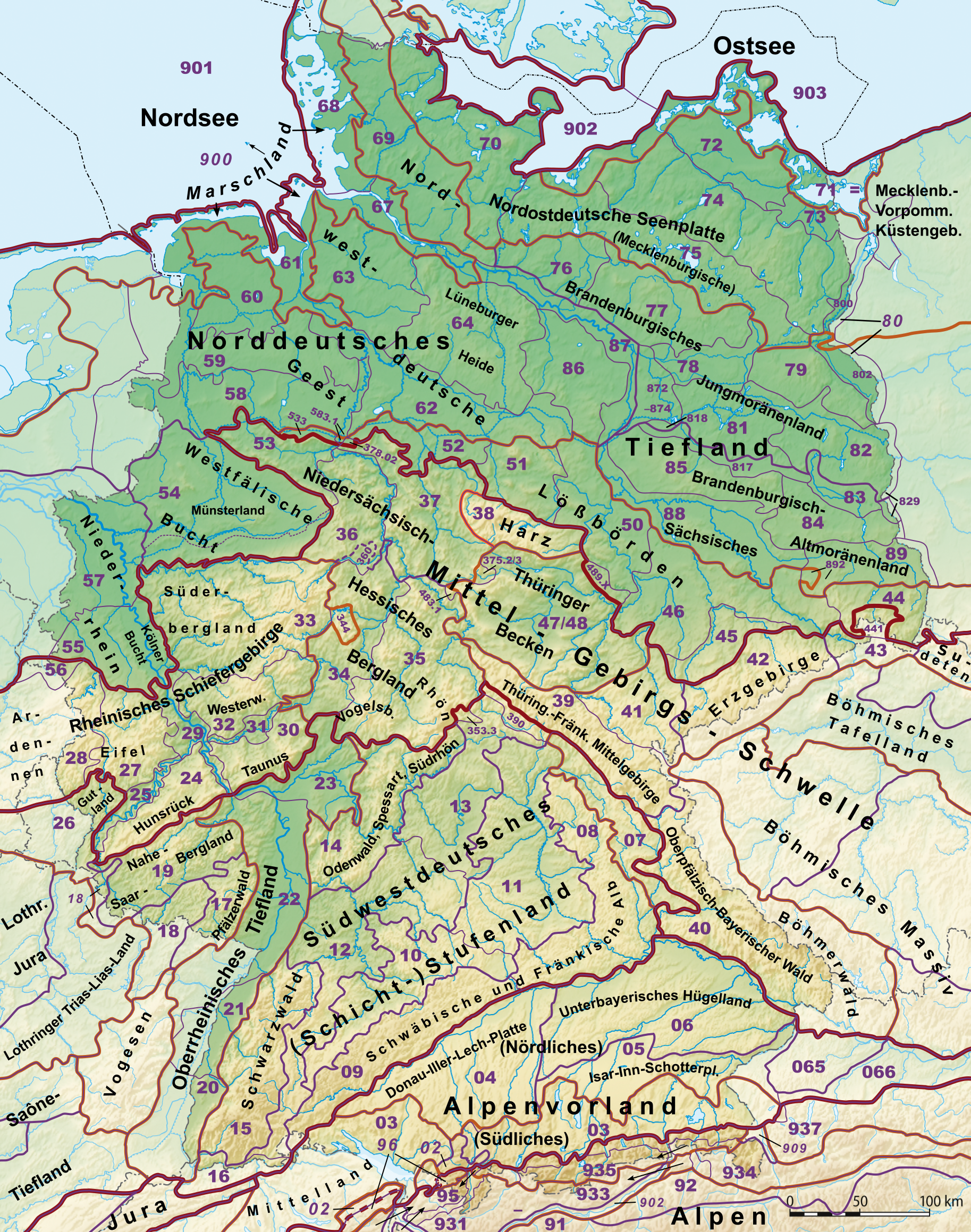
Germany's major natural regions - Level 1: dark red, 2: orange, and 3: violet; major landscape unit groups: thin violet - based on the BfL classification

This division of Germany into major natural regions takes account primarily of geomorphological, geological, hydrological, and pedological criteria in order to divide the country into large, physical units with a common geographical basis. Political boundaries play no part in this, apart from defining the national border.

In addition to a division of Germany by natural regions, the federal authorities have also produced a division by so-called landscape areas (Landschaftsräume) that is based more on human utilisation of various regions and so has clearly different boundaries.

== Groundwork by the Federal Institute of Regional Studies (BfL) ==
The natural region classification of Germany, as used today by the Federal Office for Nature Conservation (Bundesamt für Naturschutz or BfN) and by most state institutions, is largely based on the work in producing the Handbook of Natural Region Divisions of Germany between the years 1953 to 1962. This divided the present federal territory (then West and East Germany) into 86 so-called major landscape unit groups (Haupteinheitgruppen) each with a two-digit number between 01 and 90. These, in turn, were subdivided into up to ten, in some cases more, major landscape units (Haupteinheiten), each with a three-digit number. The handbook was accompanied by 1:100,000 scale mapping and, in the updated 1960 map, the major landscape unit groups were bundled together into major regions (Großregionen).

As a result, a regional classification of Germany emerged with five (since 1976: six) primary landscape regions (naturräumliche Großregionen 1. Ordnung), divided into 18 (since 1964: 19) secondary landscape regions (naturräumliche Großregionen 2. Ordnung). The major unit groups form, in effect, the third or tertiary level, of landscape regions and the major units form the fourth level. Many secondary landscape regions only have one major unit group (Mecklenburg Coastal Lowland, Harz, Thuringian Basin, Upper Main-Upper Palatine Hills, Southern Alpine Foreland), others group well-known major regions together (Rhenish Massif, South German Scarplands); others are entirely new groupings.

In the subsequent work at 1:200,000 scale that lasted until the 1990s, that further split the landscape regions into a fifth and lower levels (using the three-digits numbers supplemented with further numbers placed after a decimal comma), it became apparent that the boundaries of major regions at the second and third levels had to be corrected in several places and, in individual cases, were no longer compatible with boundaries of the major unit groups. This has no impact on the numbering system of the lower levels, however.

== New Classification by the Federal Office for Nature Conservation (BfN) ==
From 1992 to 1994, Axel Ssymank revised the major unit groups 01-90 under the direction of the BfN. Most groups retained their boundaries, however, in some cases two to four major units groups according to the handbook were combined, whilst in the North and Baltic Seas, one old group was divided into four new ones.

The numbering of the new units, D01 to D73, is entirely new and runs from north to south not, as in the handbook, from south to north. So it is not compatible with the numbers of the main and subordinate landscape units, which is why it has not been adopted by the state institutions. Even the BfN has largely followed the older system in the handbook in its landscape fact files (Landschaftssteckbriefe).

Ssymank combined the natural regions into eight so-called great landscapes (Großlandschaften), which are rather less finely divided than the secondary main regions (Großregionen 2. Ordnung) of the BfL. The only discrepancy between the two systems is the division of the North German Plain into western and eastern parts, which is based on their climatic division into Atlantic and Continental areas. The boundary runs randomly east of landscape units D22, D24, D28, D31, and D33. These great landscape definitions have yet to be used in the literature.

== List of major landscape regions - levels 1 to 3 ==
Germany can be divided into three major geographical regions: the Northern Lowland or North German Plain, the Central Uplands, and the Alps running roughly west to east across the country.

The official major landscape groups, which more or less correspond to the tertiary level of major landscape regions, are grouped following the primary and secondary landscape region system. These subdivisions largely correspond to the publications of the Institute for Regional Studies (BfL) since 1960 which are:

- The first version by Heinrich Müller-Miny appeared in the updated handbook map, the overview maps of the individual map sheets from 1960 and in the ninth edition of the handbook (1962)
- In the map sheets from publication year 1964 this version was slightly changed:
  - The Upper Palatine-Upper Main Hills (Oberpfälzisch-Obermainische Hügelland) was raised from the third to the second level.
  - The secondary landscape region of Lössbörden was expanded, especially in the west.
- There was another change in the map sheets from 1979 (Sheet 182 Burghausen) until their last publication (Sheet München and Tegernsee 1994):
  - The primary landscape region, Central Uplands (Mittelgebirge), was divided in two into Mittelgebirgsschwelle and Schichtstufenland
- The classification of the Natural regions in Saxony, published after that of the Institute for Regional Studies and continually revised, allocates the larger northern part of the major unit group of Upper Lusatia (Oberlausitz) to the Lössbörden, so that only the Lusatian Mountains (Lausitzer Bergland) in the south remains within the Central Uplands.

For clarity the first and second levels of the major landscape regions are organised from north to south and from west to east. Within a secondary or tertiary landscape region the list follows the numerical order in the handbook; the BfN's numbers are given in brackets. Tertiary major landscape regions are shown in bold italics. Maps, all to the same scale, are shown to the right of the lists.

For clarity, the English names for the natural regions are given; German names may be found at the relevant article. The English names are primarily based on Dickinson (1964) and Elkins (1972) where their classification corresponds closely to the handbook's. In such cases the source of the English name is referenced.

The seven major regions are: the Northeast German Plain, the Northwest German Plain, the Western Central Uplands, the Eastern Central Uplands, the South German Scarplands, the Alpine Foreland, and the North and Baltic Seas.

=== North and Baltic Seas ===
This is a list, exceptionally, of the three-figure major landscape units of group 90, because this de facto corresponds to the tertiary major landscape regions.

==== North Sea ====
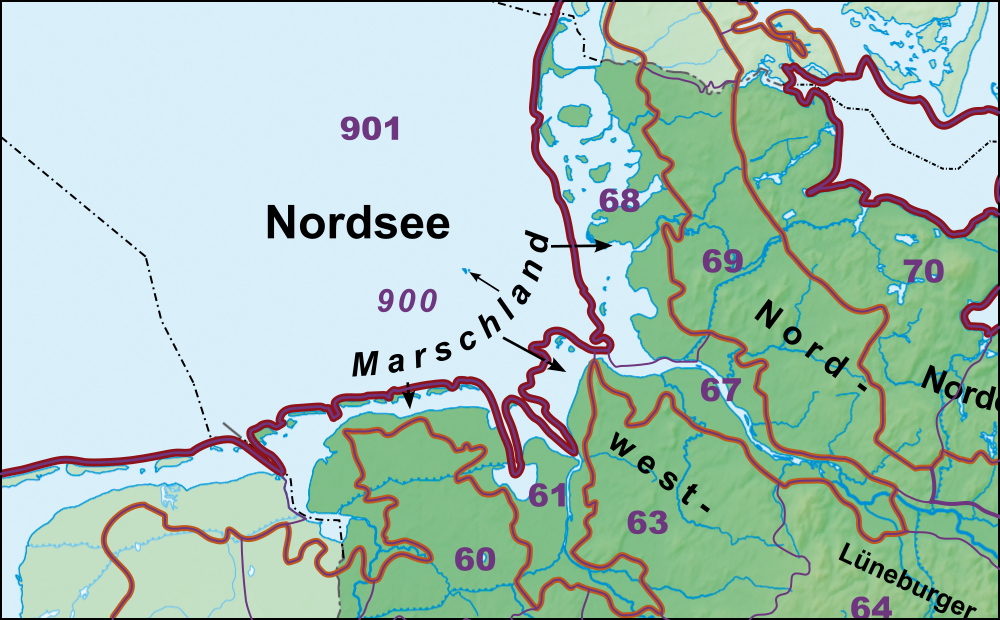

- 900 German Bight (less island of Heligoland) (D70)
- 901 Dogger Bank and adjacent Central North Sea (D71)

==== Baltic Sea ====
- 902 Western Baltic (D72)
- 903 Eastern Baltic (D73)

=== North German Plain ===
==== Marshland ====
- 61 Lower Ems and Weser Marshes (D25)
- 67 Lower Elbe Marsh (D24)
- 68 Schleswig-Holstein Marsh (D21)

==== Mecklenburg-Western Pomeranian Littoral ====
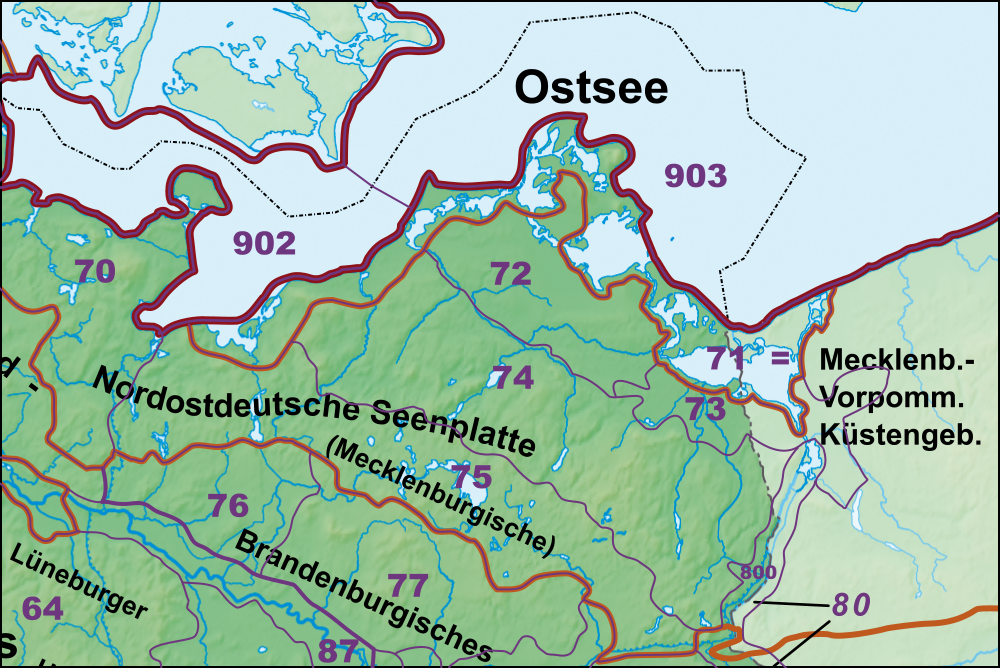

- 71 **Mecklenburg-Western Pomeranian Littoral** (D01)

==== Mecklenburg Coastal Lowland ====
Sources:

- 70 Schleswig-Holstein Uplands (D23)
- Northeast Mecklenburg Plain and Szczecin Lagoon (D02)
  - 72 Mecklenburg Ground Moraine Lowland
  - 73 Szczecin Lagoon or Lower Oder Plain
- 74 Hinterland of the Mecklenburg Lake Plateau (D 03)
- 75 Mecklenburg Lake Plateau, Mecklenburg Lake Upland or Mecklenburg-Brandenburg Lake Plateau (D04)
- (to 80 Oder Valley (D07))
  - major landscape units 800 and 801

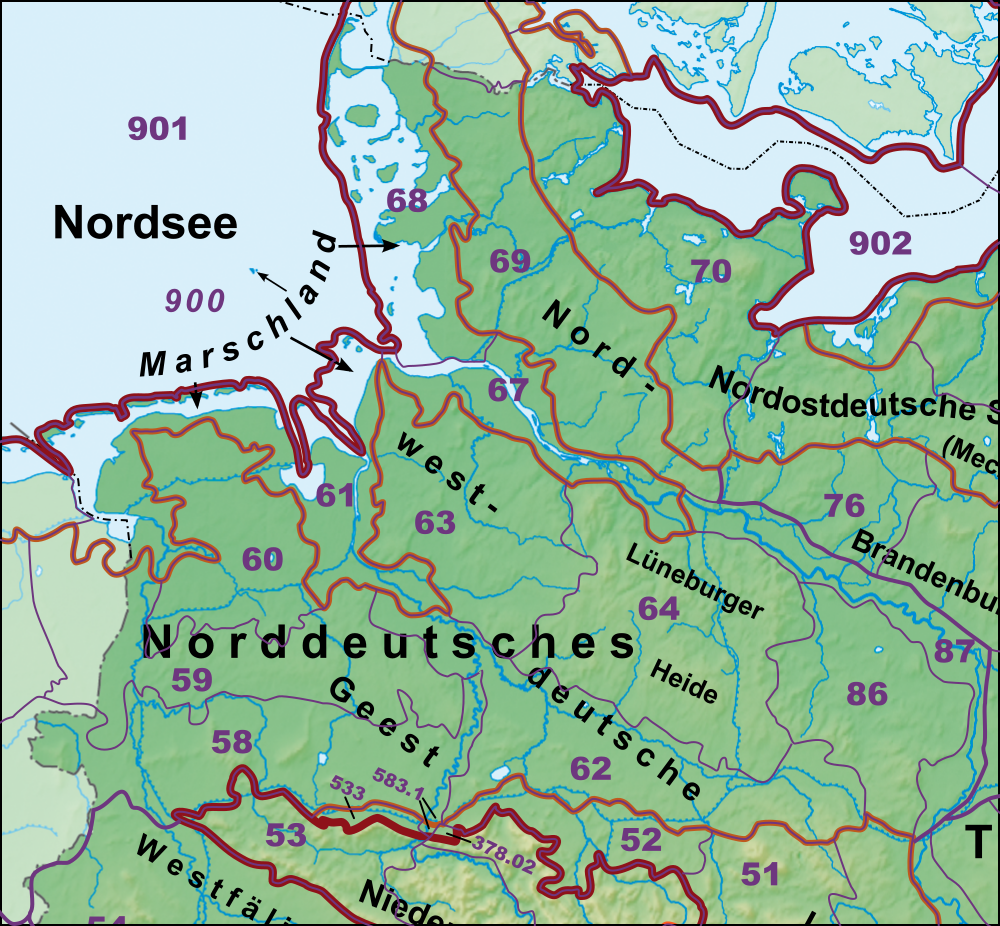

==== Central North German Plain ====
- **Ems-Weser Geest**
  - Dümmer and Ems-Hunte Geest (D30)
    - 58 Dümmer Geest Lowland
    - 59 Ems-Hunte Geest
  - 60 East Frisian Geest (D26)
  - 62 Weser-Aller Plains and Geest (D31)
- **North Elbe Geest**
  - 63 Stade Geest (D27)
  - 64 Lüneburg Heath (D28)
  - 69 Schleswig-Holstein Geest (D22)

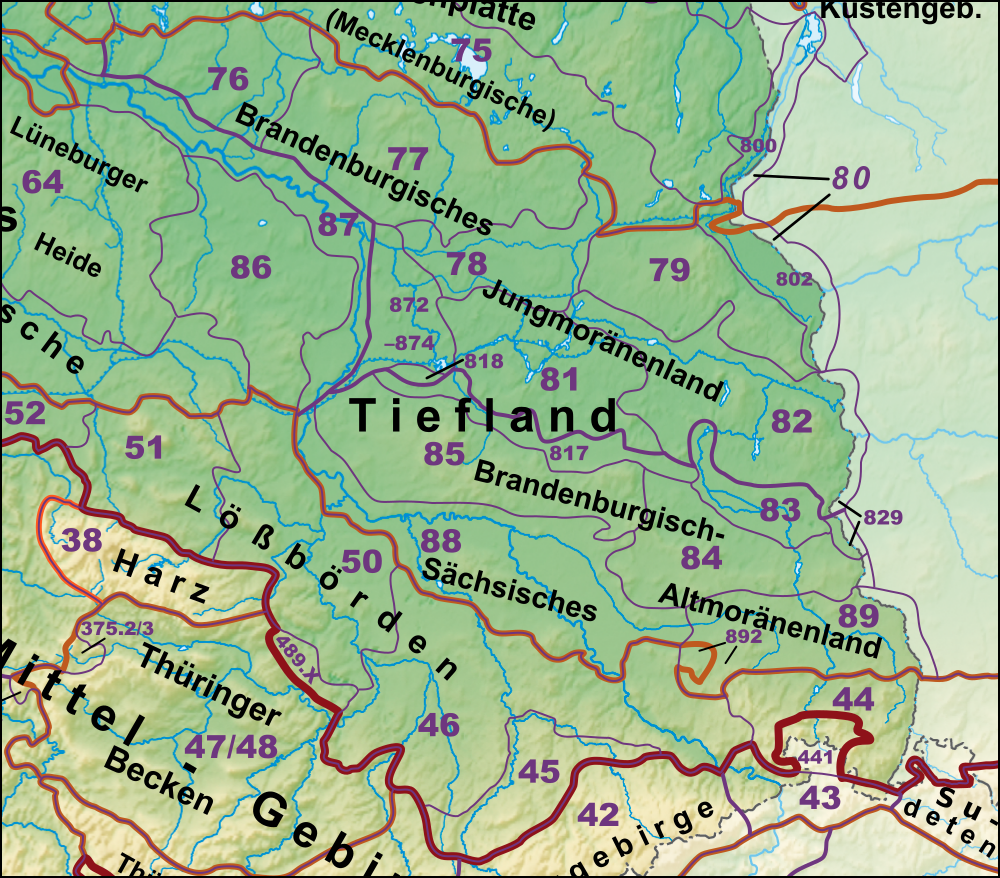

- **East German Lakeland and Heathland**
  - Mecklenburg-Brandenburg Plateaux and Upland (D05)
    - 76 South-western foreland of the Mecklenburg Lake Plateau
    - 77 North Brandenburg Plateaux and Upland
    - 78 Luchland
  - 79 East Brandenburg Plateau (D06)
  - (to 80 Oder Valley (D07))
    - major landscape units 802 and 803
  - Brandenburg Heath and Lake District (D12)
    - 81 Central Brandenburg Plateaux and Lowlands
    - 82 East Brandenburg Heath and Lake District
  - Lusatian Basin and Spreewald (D08)
    - 83 Spreewald
    - 84 Lower Lusatian Heath
  - 85 Fläming Heath (D11)
  - 86 Wendland and Altmark (D29)
  - 87 Middle Elbe Plain (D09)
  - 88 Middle Elbe Plains and Heath or Elbe-Mulde Plain (D10)
  - 89 Upper Lusatian Plateau (D13)

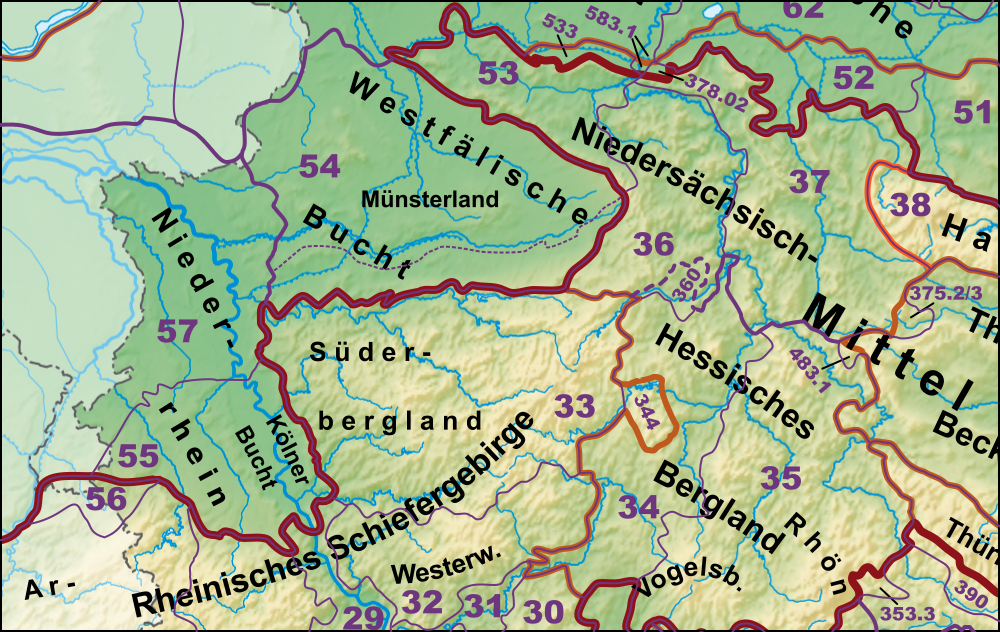

- 54 **Westphalian Lowland** or Westphalian Basin (D34)
- **Lower Rhine Plain and Cologne Lowland** (D35)
  - 55 Cologne Lowland or Lower Rhine Bay
  - 57 Lower Rhine Plain

==== Loess Belt ====
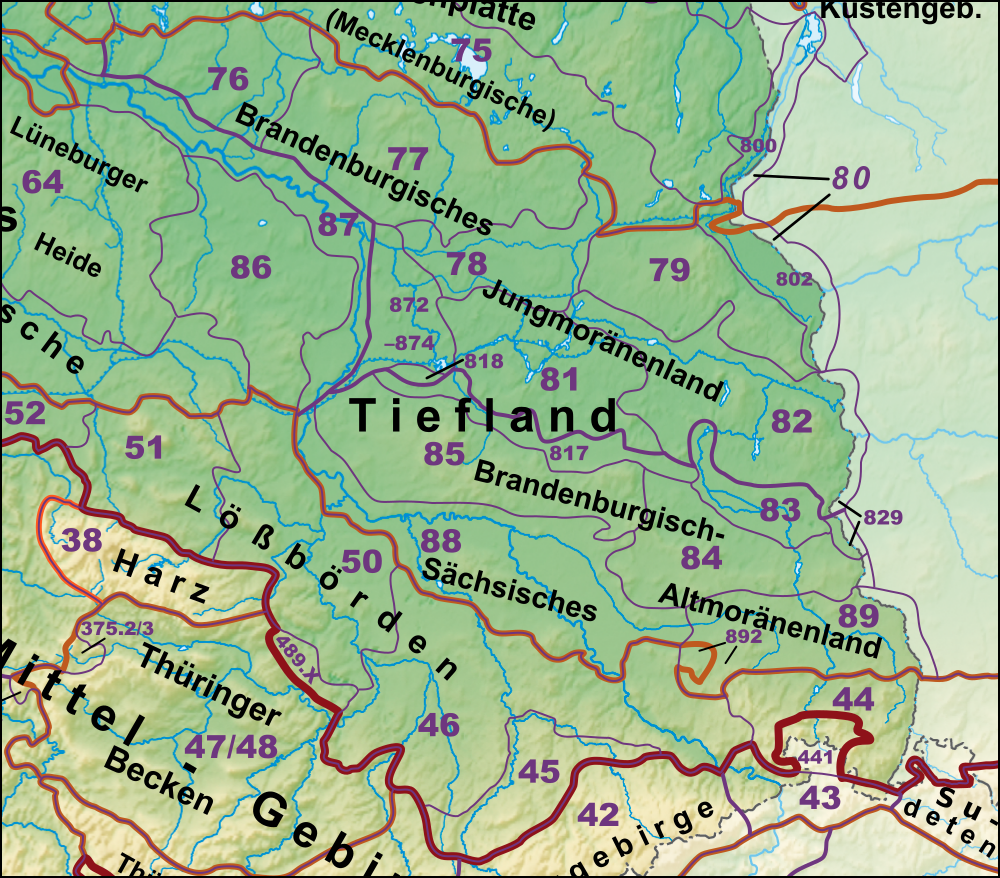

- (to 44 Upper Lusatia (D14))
  - 440 Neiß region
  - 442 East Lusatian Foothills
  - 443 West Lusatian Hills,
  - 444 Upper Lusatian Gefilde
- Saxon Lowland and Saxon Uplands (D19)
  - 45 Saxon Uplands, Saxon Hills or Ore Mountain Foreland
  - 46 Saxon Lowland (incl. Leipzig Land)
- 50 Central German Black Earth Region (also: Eastern Harz Foreland and Börde; D20)
- 51 North Harz Foreland (D33)
- 52 Lower Saxony Börde (D32)
- (to 37 Weser-Leine Uplands)
  - (to 378 Calenberg Uplands
    - 378.02 Kleinenbremener Basin
- (to 53 Lower Weser Uplands
  - 533 Lübbecke Loessland

=== Central Uplands ===
==== Rhenish Massif ====
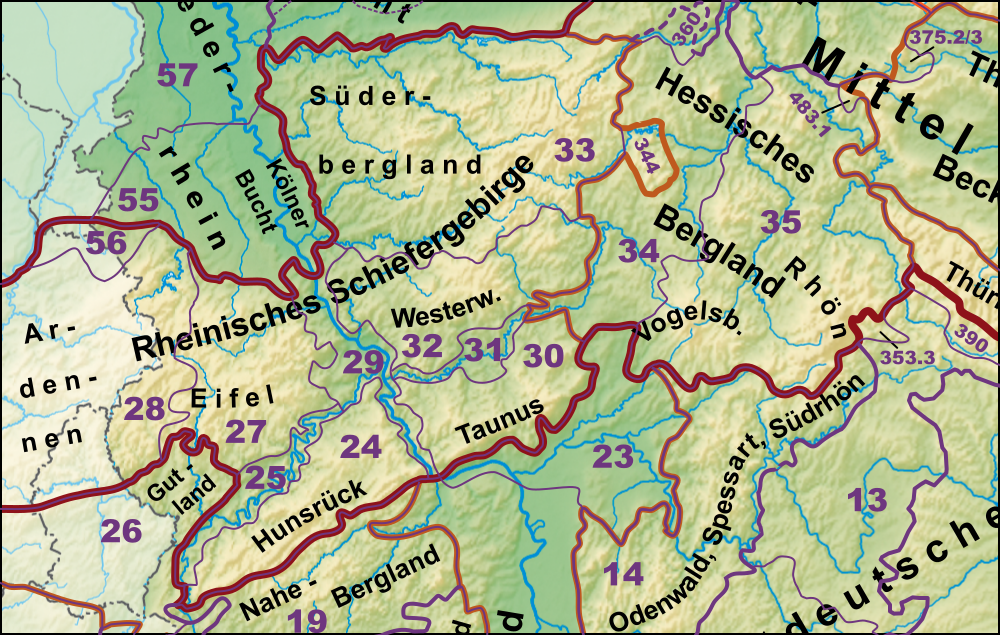

Arranged from west to east and internally from north to south)

- Eifel (incl. Venn Foreland) (D45)
  - 56 Venn Foreland
  - 28 West Eifel
  - 27 East Eifel
- 25 Moselle Valley (D43)
- 24 Hunsrück (D42)
- 29 Middle Rhine Valley (D44)
- 33 Sauerland (Süder Uplands) (D38)
- 32 Westerwald (D39)
- 31 Lahn Valley (D40)
- 30 Taunus (D41)

==== Weser Uplands and Hesse Lowlands and Highlands ====
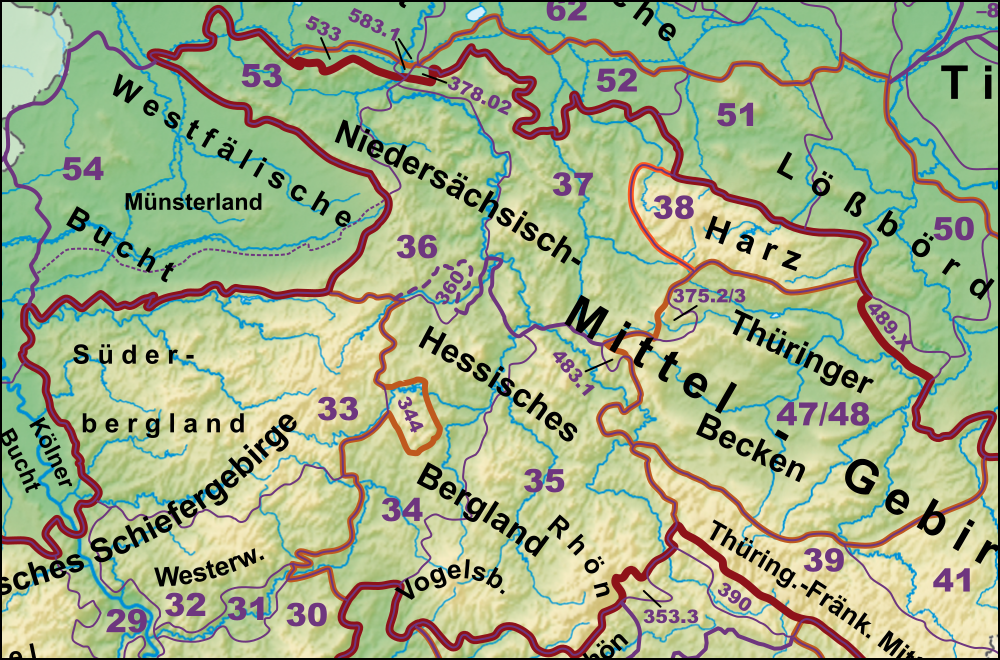

(arranged from north to south and from west to east)

- **Lower Saxon Hills** (including the Weser and **Leine Uplands) (D36)**
  - 53 Lower Weser Uplands
  - 36 Upper Weser Uplands
  - 37 Weser-Leine Uplands
- **Hesse Highlands**
  - 34 West Hesse Highlands (D46)
  - 35 East Hesse Highlands (D47)

==== Harz ====
- 38 **Harz** (D37)

==== Thuringian Basin ====
- 47/8 **Thuringian Basin (and peripheral uplands)** (D18)

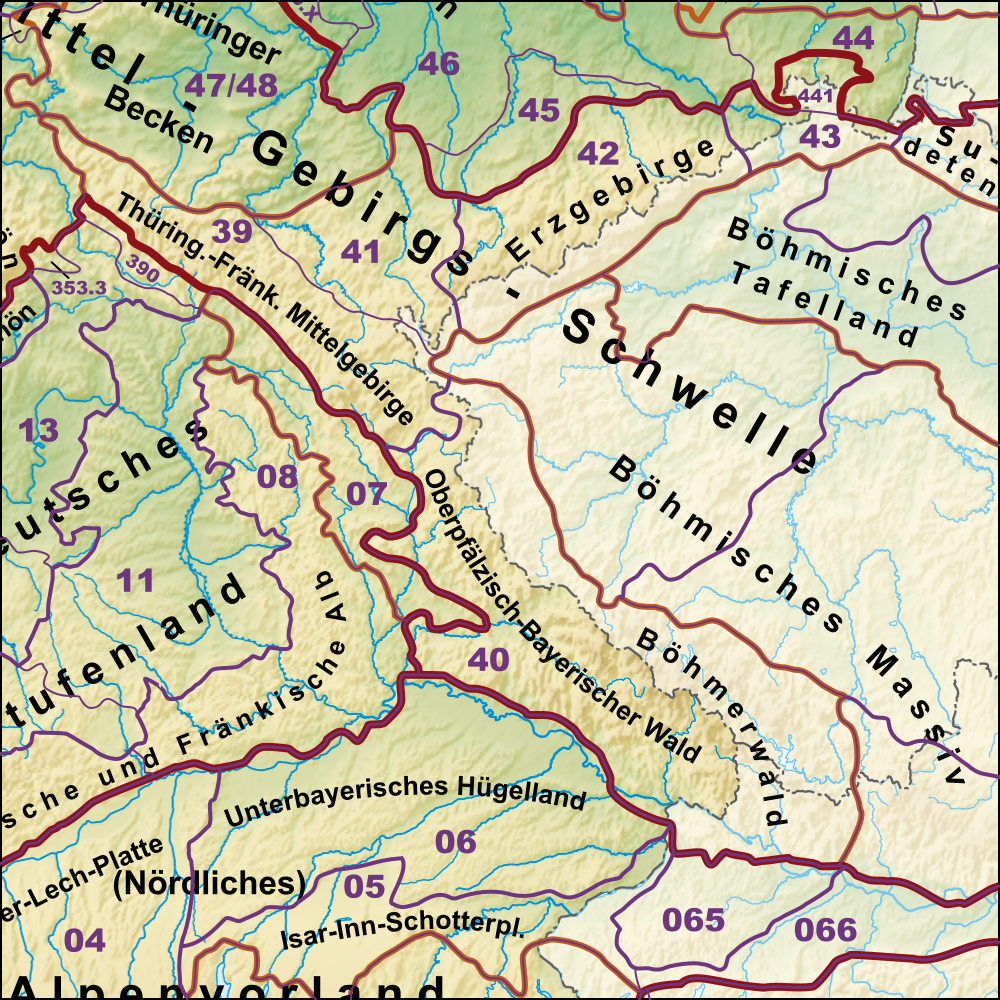

==== Eastern Central Uplands ====
- **Thuringian-Franconian Highlands (incl. the Vogtland)**
  - 39 Thuringian-Franconian Highlands (D48)
  - 41 Vogtland (D17)
- 42 **Ore Mountains** (D16)
- **Western Sudetes**
  - 43 Saxon-Bohemian Chalk Sandstone Region (D15)
  - (to 44 Upper Lusatia (D14))
    - major landscape unit 441 Lusatian Mountains
- 40 **Upper Palatine-Bavarian Forest** (D63)

=== Scarplands on either side of the Upper Rhine Valley ===
==== Palatine-Saarland Scarplands ====
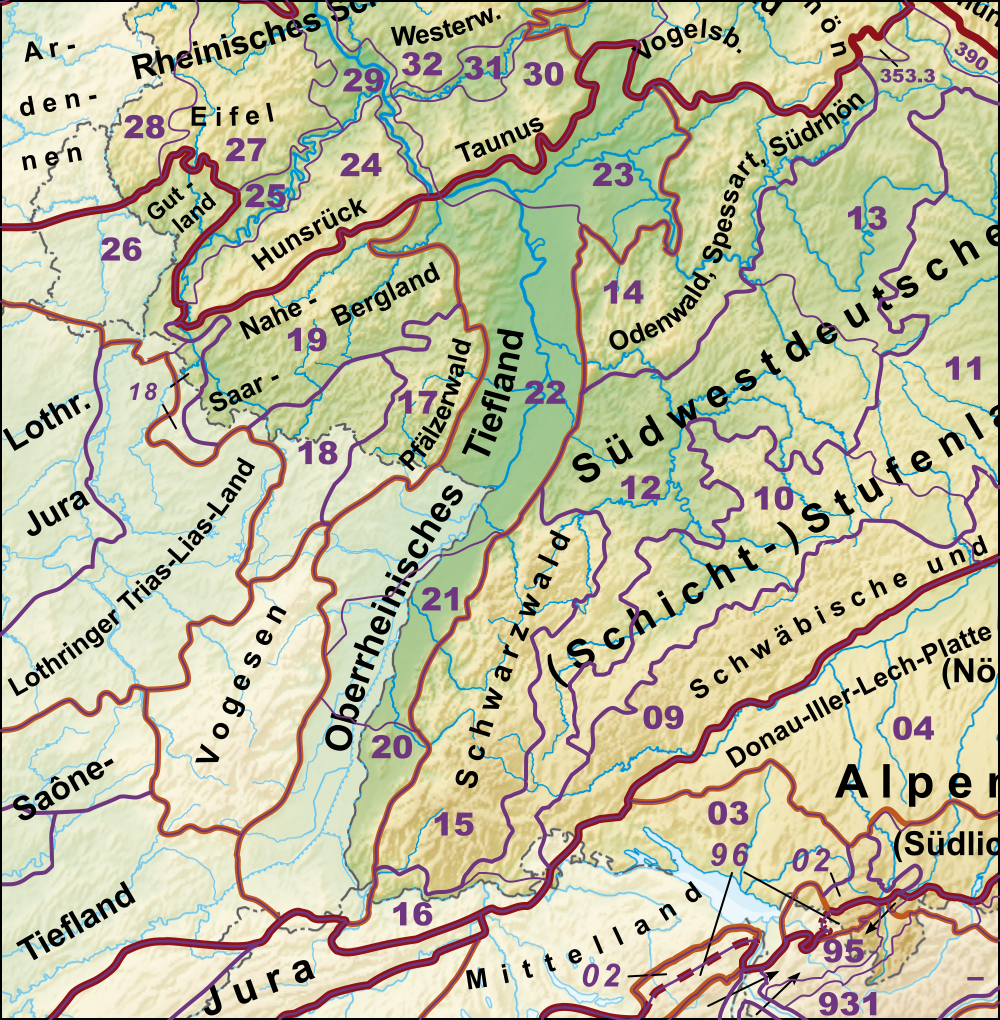

Division from north to south and from west to east

- **Lorraine Trias-Lias Region**
  - 26 Gutland (Bitburg Land) (D49)
  - (to 18 Palatine-Saarland Muschelkalk Region (D50))
    - major landscape units 182 and 183
- 19 **Saar-Nahe Hills** or Uplands (D52)
- 18 **Palatine-Saarland Muschelkalk Region** excl. Merzig Muschelkalk Plateau (D50)
- 17 **Palatine Forest** (the Haardt) (D51)

==== Upper Rhine Plain ====
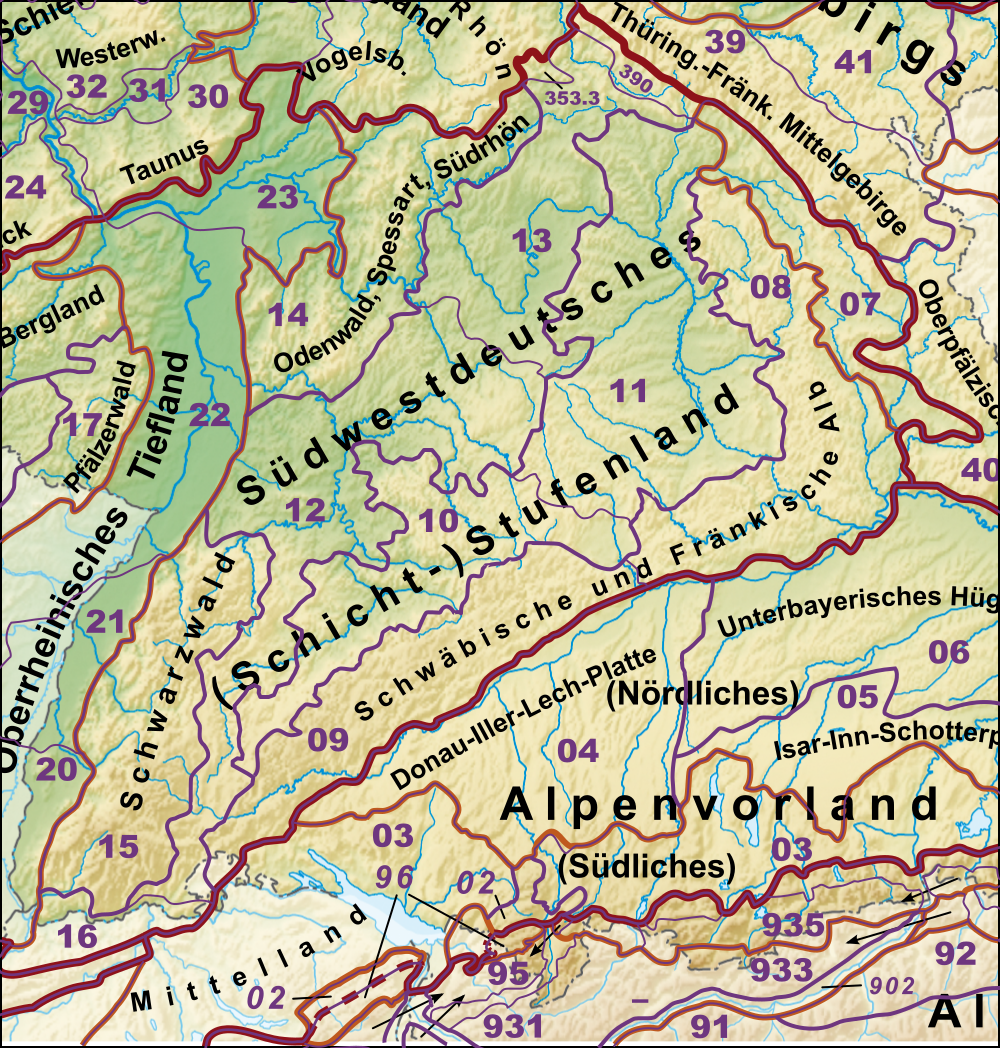

Divided from north to south.

- **Upper Rhine Plain** (D53)
  - 23 Rhine-Main Basin
  - 22 Northern Upper Rhine Plain
  - 21 Middle Upper Rhine Plain
  - 20 Southern Upper Rhine Plain

==== South German Scarplands ====
(arranged by escarpments Grundgebirge/Buntsandstein, Muschelkalk, Keuper-Lias and Malm from north to south, internally from west to east.

- 14 **Odenwald-Spessart-Rhön** (D55)
- 15 **Black Forest** (D54)
- **Swabian-Franconian Gäue**
  - 12 Neckar and Tauber Gäu Plateaus (D57)
  - 13 Main Franconia Plateau (D56)
- **Swabian-Franconian Keuper-Lias Lands**
  - 10 Swabian Keuper-Lias Lands (D58)
  - 11 Franconian Keuper-Lias Lands (D59)
- **Swabian-Franconian Jura**
  - 09 Swabian Jura (D60)
  - 08 Franconian Jura (D61)
- 16 **Upper Rhine Region (Dinkelberg and Upper Rhine Valley)** (D69)

==== Upper Palatine-Upper Main Hills ====
- 07 **Upper Palatine-Upper Main Hills** (D62)

=== Alpine Foreland ===
arranged from north to south and from west to east)

==== Northern Alpine Foreland ====
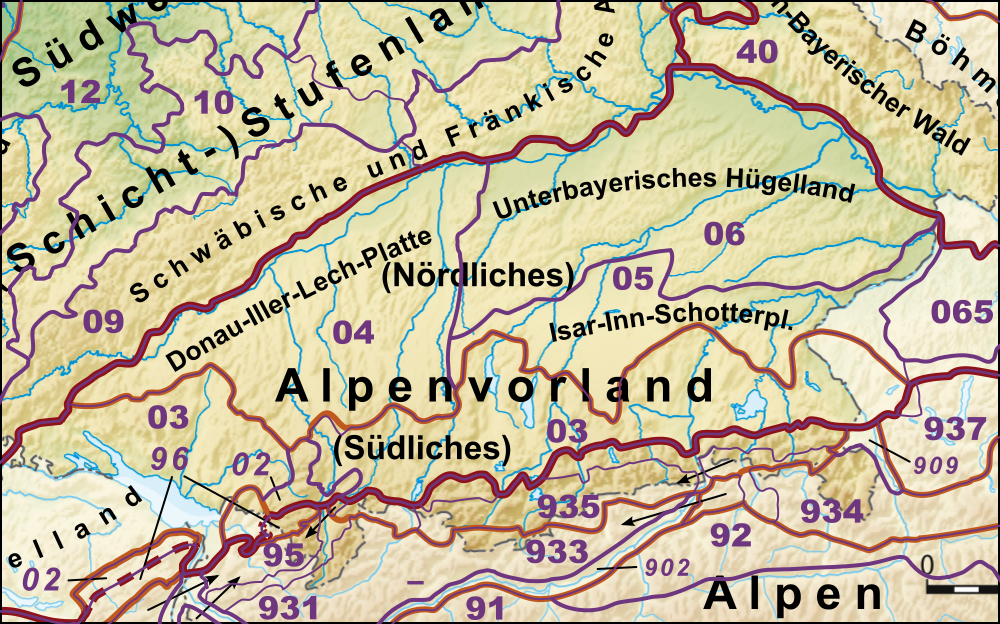
This map does not show the latest situation and still combines under 02 landscape units that mainly belong to the Alps.

- 04 **Iller-Lech Plateau** (D64)
- Lower Bavarian Upland and Isar-Inn Gravel Plateau (D65)
  - 06 **Lower Bavarian Upland**
  - 05 **Isar-Inn Gravel Plateau**

==== Southern Alpine Foreland ====
- **Pre-Alpine Hills and Moorland** (= Southern Alpine Foreland; D66)
  - 03 Subalpine New Moraine Land
  - 02* Nagelfluh Hills and Basins between Lake Constance and Wertach

=== Alps ===
The following 3 groups were still counted as part of (ex-)group 02 in the Handbook; the German sections form D67 (BfN).

==== Nagelfluh Mountains of the Appenzell Alps ====
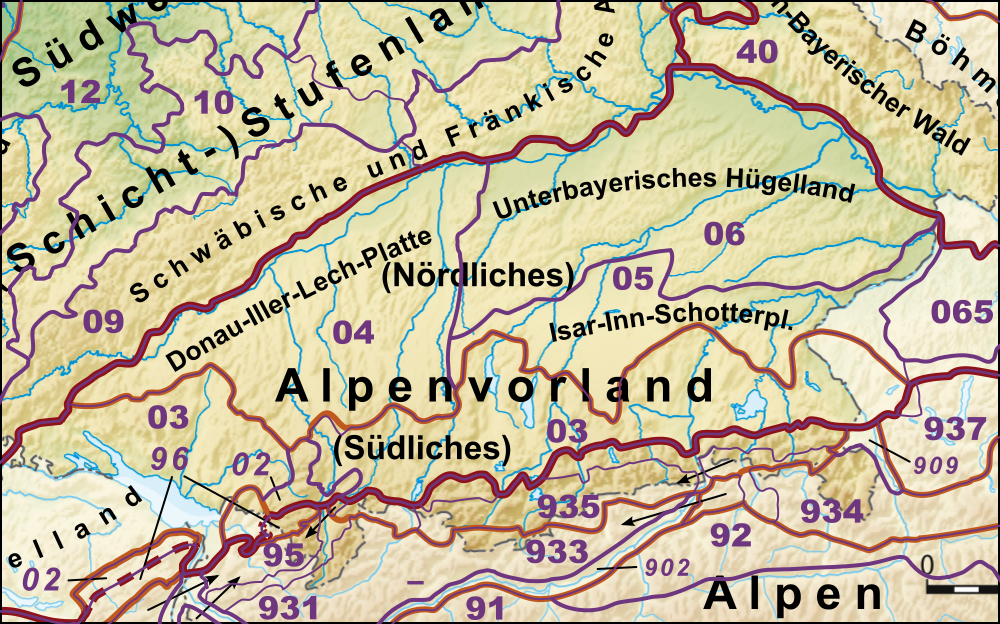
The two Nagelfluh groups (02 and 96) are located in the west of the map extract on the boundary between the Alpine Foreland and the Alps

- (to 02 Nagelfluh Hills and Basins – Alpine Foreland)
  - Molasse Ridges of St. Gallen–Appenzell (northeast of St. Peterzell 1170 m; CH)
- (to 96 Swiss and Allgäu Nagelfluh Ridges)
  - Gäbris Ridges (Speer 1,950 m; CH)

==== Lower Bregenz Forest ====
- (to 02 Nagelfluh Hills and Basins – Alpine Foreland)
  - 020 Pfänder (Hirschberg 1,095 m; D and A)
  - 021.0–5 with 021.2 Sulzberg (1,041 m; A)
- (to 96 Swiss and Allgäu Nagelfluh Ridges)
  - 960 Allgäu Nagelfluh Ridge (Rindalphorn 1,822 m)

==== Swabian-Bavarian Pre-alps ====
- (to 90 Basins and valleys between the main Alpine groups)
  - (to 900 Basins and valleys in the western Vorarlberg-Allgäu Alps)
  - (to 902 Inn Valley)
    - 902.4 Basins of Kiefer Fields and Inn Valley
  - 908 Inzell Basin

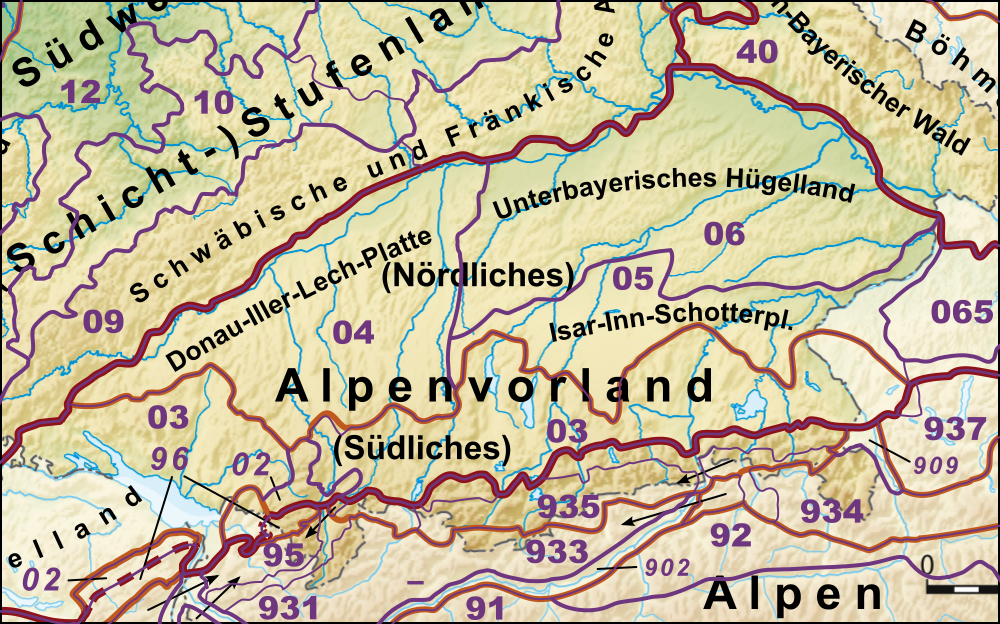
The major landscape region is located in the centre on the northern edge of the Alps, its southern section is part of the Intermediate Limestone Alps (935); in the unlabelled segments is a combination of the Flysch Alps (94) and foothill chains (936) with basins (908, 930).

- (to93 Northern Limestone Eastern Alps)
  - (930 Basins and valleys between the main groups of the Northern Limestone Eastern Alps (part))
  - 935 Bavarian-Tyrolean Intermediate Limestone Alps (less 935.7)
  - 936 Border mountains of the Northern Limestone-Eastern Alps or Limestone Alp Border Mountains or Limestone Border Mountains
- (to 94 Flysch Alps)
  - (to 941 East Allgäu Flysch Alps)
    - 941.1 Mountains around the Wertacher Hörnle
    - 941.2 Bayerstädter Kopf-Alpspitz-Edelsberg Group
  - 942 Trauchgau-Murnau (Ammergau) Flysch Alps
  - 943 Tölz-Tegernsee-Chiemgau Flysch Alps
  - 944 Western Salzburg Flysch Alps
- (to 95 Northern Limestone Western Alps)
  - (to 950 Vorarlberg-Allgäu Quintner and Schrattenkalkgewölbe)
    - 950.0 Grünten (1,738 m)

==== Austrian Pre-Alps ====
Only the western end of the group, which lies entirely in Austria, was studied.

- (to 93 Northern Limestone Eastern Alps)
  - 937 (unnamed)
- (to 94 Flysch Alps)
  - 945 Eastern Salzburg Flysch Alps

==== Northern Limestone Alps (west) ====
The following group was counted as (ex-)group 01 in the Handbook; the German parts near Oberstdorf and Garmisch-Partenkirchen belong to D68 (BfN).

- (to 90 Basins and valleys between the main Alpine groups)
  - Rhine Valley
  - Illtal
  - 900 Basins and valleys in the western part of the Vorarlberg-Allgäu Alps
  - 901 Oberstdorf Basin and side valleys (Illertal and Basins and valleys in the eastern part of the Vorarlberg-Allgäu Alps)
  - 902 Inn Valley (less 902.4)

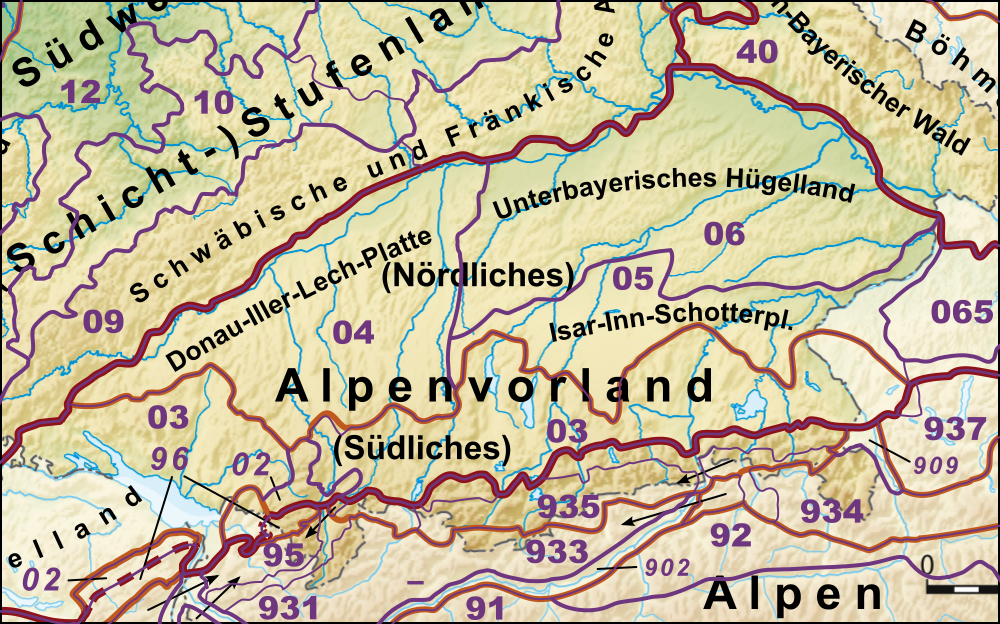
The main part of the major landscape region (centre and west, below) consists of the major landscape units 931 to 933 and, in the west, parts of 95.

- (to 93 Northern Limestone Eastern Alps)
  - 930 Basins and valleys between the main groups of the Northern Limestone Eastern Alps (partly)
  - 931 Allgäu Alps
  - 932 Lechtal Alps
  - 933 Inn Valley Riffkalkketten (less 333.7)
- (to 94 Flysch Alps)
  - 940 Vorarlberg and West Allgäu Flysch Alps
  - (to 941 East Allgäu Flysch Alps)
    - 941.0 Flysch Mountains around the Imberger Horn
- (to 95 Northern Limestone Western Alps)
  - Alpstein Group (up to 2,502 m)
  - Rätikon (up to 2,964 m)
  - 950 Vorarlberg-Allgäu Quintner and Schrattenkalkgewölbe (less 950.0)

==== Northern Limestone Alps (east) ====
The following group was counted as part of (ex-)group 01 in the Handbook; the German parts near Berchtesgaden belong accordingly to D68 (BfN).

Most of the group lies in Austria.

- (to 90 Basins and valleys between the main groups of the Alps)
  - 909 Salzach-Saalach Alpine Perimeter Bay

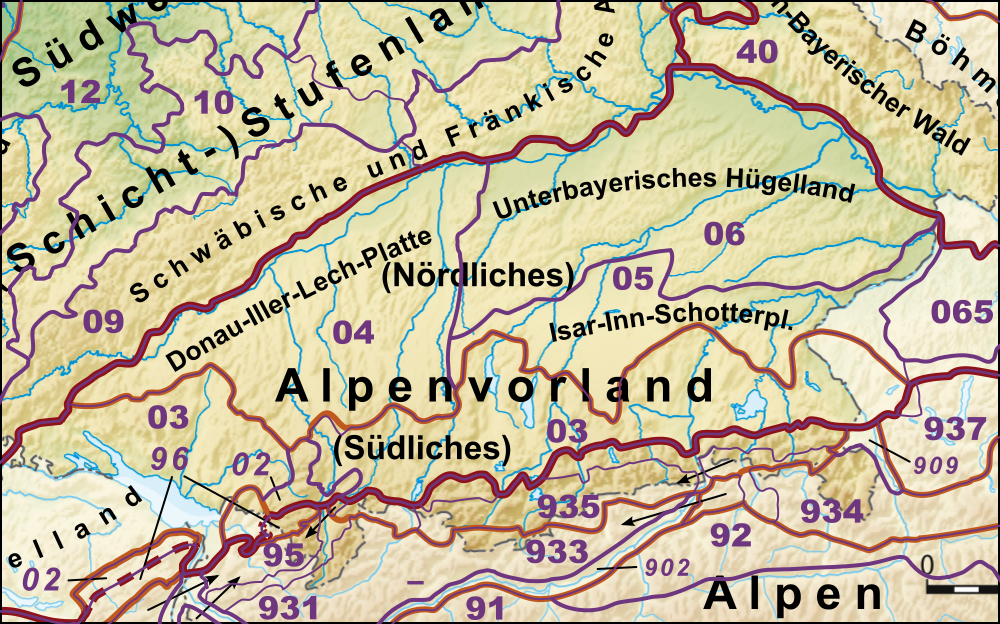
The main part of the major landscape region (southern east part of the extract) consists of major landscape uunit 934 and, in the west, of parts of 933 and 935.

- 93 Northern Limestone Eastern Alps
  - 930 Basins and valleys between the main groups of the Northern Limestone Eastern Alps(in places)

(to 933 Inn Valley Riffkalkketten)

  - 933.7 Kaisergebirge (up to 2,344 m)
  - 934 Salzburg Plateau Limestone Alps
  - (to 935 Bavarian-Tyrolean Intermediate Limestone Alps)
    - 935.7 Kirchdorf Dolomite Alps

==== Central Alps ====
The Central Alps lies completely outside of Germany and are only mapped at the fringes.

- 91 Eastern Central Alps
- 92 Slate Alps of the Northern Greywacke Zone

== See also ==
- Geography of Germany
- List of natural regions in Schleswig-Holstein
- Natural regions of Saxony

== Sources ==
- Dickinson, Robert E. (1964). Germany: A regional and economic geography (2nd ed.). London: Methuen. p. 84.
- Elkins, T.H. (1972). Germany (3rd ed.). London: Chatto & Windus, 1972. ASIN B0011Z9KJA.
- Incorporation of the old major geographical units 010-903 into the new natural regions D01-D73 by the BfN
- Kohl, Horst; Marcinek, Joachim and Nitz, Bernhard (1986). Geography of the German Democratic Republic, VEB Hermann Haack, Gotha. ISBN 978-3-7301-0522-1
- Meynen, Emil (ed.) Handbuch der naturräumlichen Gliederung Deutschlands. Selbstverlag der Bundesanstalt für Landeskunde, Remagen, 1953-1962 (Part 1, contains issues 1–5), ISBN B0000BJ19E
- Meynen, Emil (ed.) Handbuch der naturräumlichen Gliederung Deutschlands. Selbstverlag der Bundesanstalt für Landeskunde, Remagen, 1959-1962 (Part 2, contains issues 6–9), ISBN B0000BJ19F
- Ssymank, A. Neue Anforderungen im europäischen Naturschutz. Das Schutzgebietssystem Natura 2000 und die "FFH-Richtlinie der EU". – Zeitschrift „Natur und Landschaft“ Jg. 69. 1994, Heft 9: S. 395–406. Bonn-Bad Godesberg. ISSN 0028-0615
