= Dümmer Geest Lowland =

Natural region unit of the 3rd level in northwest Germany

- Classification: Handbook of Natural Region Divisions of Germany
- Level 1 Region: North German Plain
- Level 2 Region: North German Urstromtal and Plateaux
- Level 3 Region: North German Geest
- Major unit group: 58 → Dümme Geest Lowland
- Natural region: 58 → Dümmer Geest Lowland
- State(s): Lower Saxony
- Country: Germany

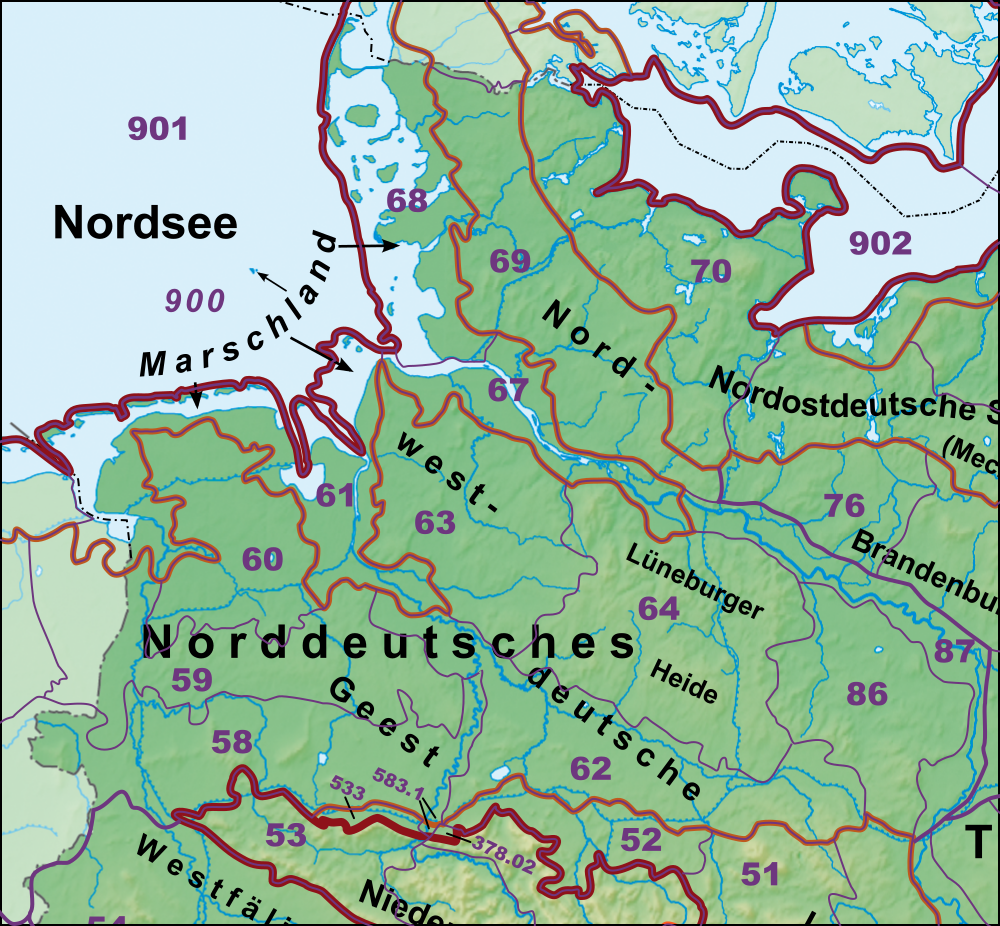

The Dümmer Geest Lowland (German: Dümmer-Geestniederung) is a natural region unit of the 3rd level in northwest Germany that mainly extends over southwestern Lower Saxony with a small area over the border in North Rhine-Westphalia. Its uniqueness consists in the very varied juxtaposition of different landscape elements of the Northern Lowlands of which the Dümmer Geest Lowland is a part.

== Establishment ==
The proposed area was recognized as comprising several kinds of natural region in the wake of the scientifically-oriented division of Germany into natural region units in the 1950s. It was classified as a "natural region unit of the third-order" or even as a "major unit group", called the Dümmer Geest Lowland and given the number 58 within the classification schema that covered the whole of Germany. The region was subdivided into natural region major units, which are, in turn, divided into units of a lower order.

The name is still not in common everyday use.

== Region and boundaries ==
The area of the Dümmer Geest Lowland is roughly bounded by the following line: Dutch border near Meppen – Vechta – Sulingen – Hoya – Nienburg/Weser – Minden – Mittelland Canal to Rheine – Dutch border near Nordhorn.

It thus covers all or part of the following counties: Grafschaft Bentheim, Emsland, Osnabrück, Vechta, Diepholz and Nienburg in Lower Saxony and Minden-Lübbecke and Steinfurt in North Rhine-Westphalia.

Adjacent natural regions of the third level are the Westphalian Basin to the southwest, the Ems-Hunte Geest to the north, the Weser-Aller Plain to the east and the Lower Weser Uplands to the south.

== Subdivisions ==
The Dümmer Bog Geest as a natural region unit of the third order is further subdivided into natural units of the fourth level (natural region major units):

- 580 Nordhorn-Bentheim Sand Lowland
- 581 Plantlünne Sand Plain
- 582 Rahden-Diepenau Geest
- 583 Middle Weser Valley
- 584 Diepholz Marshes
- 585 Bersenbrück Land
- 586 Lingen Land

The numbers relate to the classification system.

== Literature ==
- Emil Meynen (ed.): Handbuch der naturräumlichen Gliederung Deutschlands. Selbstverlag der Bundesanstalt für Landeskunde, Remagen, 1959–1962 (Part 2, contains issues 6–9).
