= Mittelgebirge =

Type of low mountain range or hill country common in central Europe

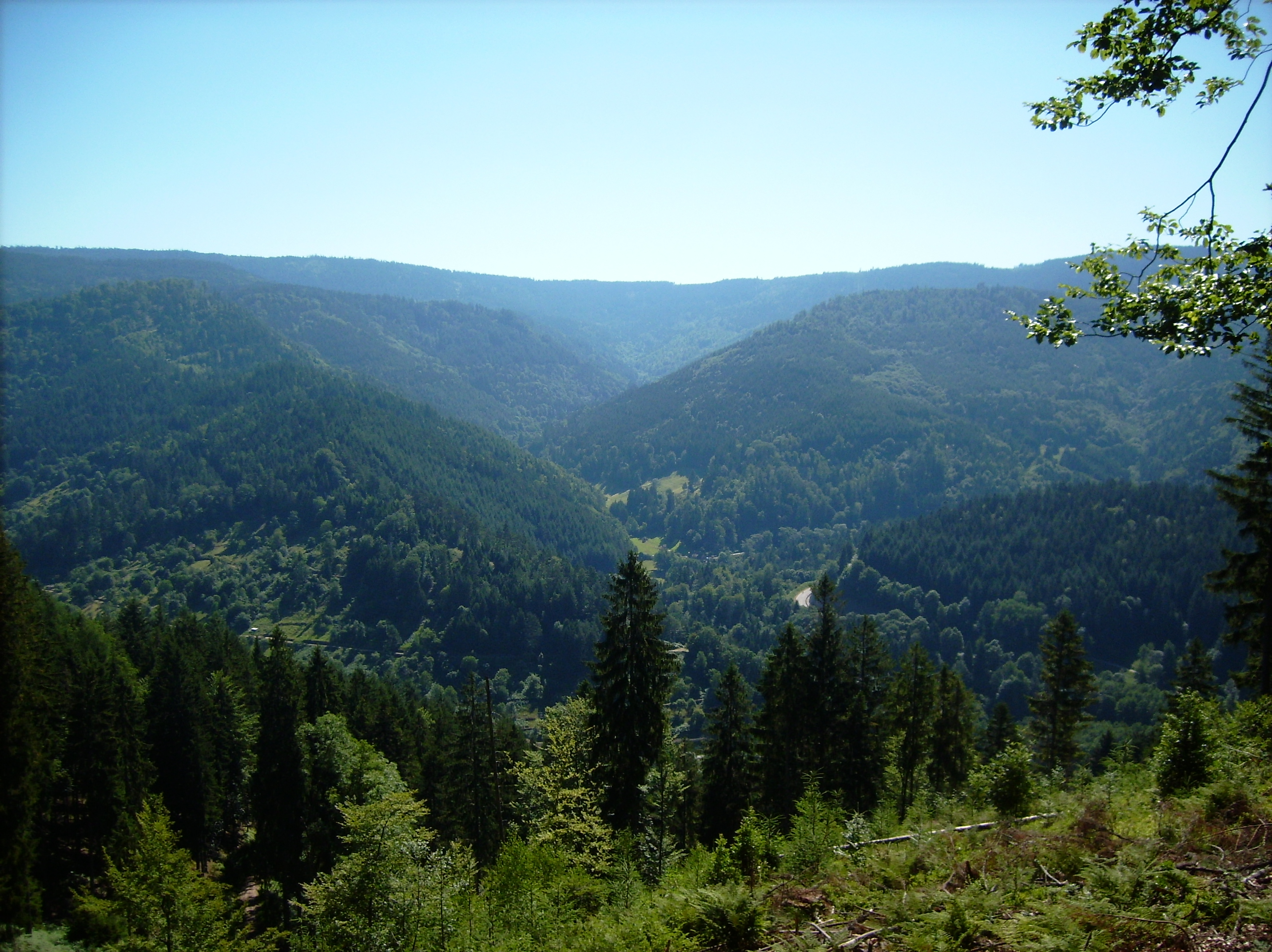
Murg Valley in the Black Forest range

A Mittelgebirge (from German Mittel 'middle, mid' and Gebirge 'mountains, mountainous area', pronounced [ˈmɪtl̩ɡəˌbɪʁɡə]) is a type of relatively low mountain range or highland area typical of the geography of central Europe, especially central and southern Germany; it refers to something between rolling hill country or Hügelland and a serrated or more prominent mountain range (German: Gebirge or Hochgebirge) like the High Alps.

== Characteristics ==
The term is not precise, but typically refers to topography where the peaks rise at least 200 metres (660 ft) to 500 metres (1,600 ft) above the surrounding terrain (as opposed to above sea level). The summits usually do not reach the tree line and were not glaciated after the last glacial period. In contrast, Hochgebirge is used to refer to mountain ranges rising above approximately 1,500 metres (4,900 ft) to 1,800 metres (5,900 ft). The delineation corresponds with the differentation between Montane and Alpine level according to altitudinal zonation.

== Mittelgebirge ranges ==
In the plural, die Mittelgebirge (as opposed to the singular, das Mittelgebirge), sometimes qualified as die deutschen Mittelgebirge, usually refers to the Central Uplands of Germany which is a belt of low mountain ranges or hills between the Northern Lowland and the Bavarian Alpine Foreland.

The ranges stretch from the North German Plain up to the Alps in the south. The northern limitation is marked by the Mittelgebirge threshold (Mittelgebirgsschwelle), running from the Belgian Ardennes in the west along the Rhenish Massif, the Rhön and Harz Mountains, the Thuringian Forest and the Fichtel Mountains to the Bohemian Massif on the Czech border, including the Bavarian Forest and the Ore Mountains, leading to the Bohemian Forest and to the Sudetes (Note: Due to its high vertical extent above the tree line (400 m in the Giant Mountains) and the existence of up to four altitudinal vegetation belts the Sudetes are considered a Mittelgebirge with some characteristics proper of high mountains.) in the east.

In the southwest, the Upper Rhine Plain stretches up to the Swiss border at Basel, accompanied by the South German Scarplands including the Odenwald range and the Black Forest, as well as the Swabian Jura and its eastern continuation, the Franconian Jura. Left of the Upper Rhine, the North French Scarplands reach from the Palatinate and the Vosges Mountains down to the Paris Basin.

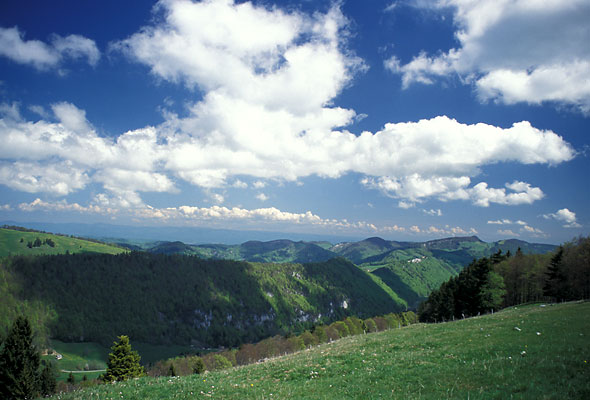
View over the Jura Mountains near Passwang Pass to the Black Forest

Along the Swiss-French border run the Jura Mountains, a fold mountain range reaching up to 1,718 metres (5,636 ft), separated from the western Alps by the Swiss Plateau. Though located within the Alpine foothills, the Jura Mountains are usually considered a separate Mittelgebirge range, while the Karst Plateau, leading to the Dinarides, geologically forms a part of the southern Alps.

In Hungary, the Transdanubian Mountains form an extended Mittelgebirge range within the Pannonian Basin. Stretching from Lake Balaton to north of Budapest, marked by the Danube Bend, it separates the Little and Great Hungarian Plain.

In France, the Massif Central, located between the western Alps and the Pyrenees, rises to 1,886 metres (6,188 ft) but does not reach the tree line due to its Mediterranean climate. In Italy, most parts of the Apennine Mountains running from the Maritime Alps down to the Strait of Messina are shaped by its Mittelgebirge character, though in Abruzzo peaks are up to 2,912 metres (9,554 ft) high. In Britain well-known examples include the pikes of the Lake District, the Pennines, the Scottish Highlands and the Snowdon Massif, in Ireland the MacGillycuddy's Reeks, in the United States some ranges of the Appalachians, such as the Green Mountains (Vermont).
