= List of natural regions in Schleswig-Holstein =

This List of natural regions in Schleswig-Holstein covers the higher level natural regions that lie wholly or partially on the territory of the North German state of Schleswig-Holstein. They are based on the official list of natural regions in Germany that was adopted in the 1950s and set out in the Handbook of Natural Regional Divisions in Germany (Handbuch der Naturräumlichen Gliederung Deutschlands), by the Ministry for Agriculture and the Environment in Schleswig-Holstein.

The system shown is that published by the Federal Agency for Nature Conservation (Bundesamt für Naturschutz or BfN) in 1994. It differs slightly from the earlier system whose numbering is given in brackets for the major regions only.

The major natural regions in this system are divided into sub-regions (Untereinheiten), landscape units (Teileinheiten) and topographical units (Grundeinheiten). They are only listed here, further information about them being found in the relevant articles.

These units tend to cross the state borders and are not related to the political division of states into provinces or districts. As a result, they may also be mentioned in articles on neighbouring states such as, in this case, Mecklenburg-Vorpommern.

== Divisions ==
=== Northwest German Plain ===
==== D21 Schleswig-Holstein Marshes (68) ====
- 681 North Frisian Marsh Islands and Halligen (Nordfriesische Marschinseln und Halligen)
- 682 North Frisian Marsh (Nordfriesische Marsch)
- 683 Eiderstedt Marsh (Eiderstedter Marsch)
- 684 Dithmarsch Marsh (Dithmarscher Marsch)

==== D24 Lower Elbe Basin (Elbe Marshes) (67) ====
- 671 Holstein Elbe Marshes (Holsteinische Elbmarschen)

==== D22 Schleswig-Holstein Geest (69) ====
- 680 North Frisian Geest Islands (Nordfriesische Geestinseln)
- 690 Leck Geest (Lecker Geest)
- 691 Bredstedt-Husum Geest (Bredstedt-Husumer Geest)
- 692 Eider-Treene Basin (Eider-Treene-Niederung)
- 693 Heide-Itzehoe Geest (Heide-Itzehoer Geest)
- 694 Barmstedt-Kisdorf Geest (Barmstedt-Kisdorfer Geest)
- 695 Hamburg Ring (Hamburger Ring)
- 696 Lauenburg Geest (Lauenburger Geest)
- 697 Schleswig Vorgeest (Schleswiger Vorgeest)
- 698 Holstein Foregeest (Holsteinische Vorgeest)

==== D23 Schleswig-Holstein Uplands (70) ====
- 700 Angeln
- 701 Schwansen – Danish Wahld (Schwansen – Dänischer Wohld)
- 702a East Holstein Uplands and Lakes - Northeast (Ostholsteinische Hügel- und Seenland Nordwest)
- 702b East Holstein Uplands and Lakes - Southwest (Ostholsteinische Hügel- und Seenland Südost)
- 703 Nordoldenburg and Fehmarn (Nordoldenburg und Fehmarn)

==== D04 Mecklenburg Lake District (75) ====
- 750 West Mecklenburg Lakes and Uplands (Westmecklenburigsche Seen-Hügelland)

==== D05 Mecklenburg-Brandenburg Plateaus and Uplands (76-78) ====
- 760 South Mecklenburg Lowlands (with sands and clay plateaus) (Südmecklenburgische Niederungen (mit Sandflächen und Lehmplatten))

== General sources ==
- Description, map and source (in German)
