= Landstuhl Marsh =

Region of Rhineland-Palatinate, Germany

Coordinates: 49°24′30″N 7°29′00″E

The Landstuhl Marsh or Landstuhl Bog (German: (Spesbach-)Landstuhler Bruch, Westricher Moorniederung or Westpfälzische Moorniederung) is a region in West Palatinate in the German state of Rhineland-Palatinate.

According to the Handbook of the Natural Region Divisions of Germany Landstuhl Marsh, which covers an area of the 67 km², is part of the Kaiserslautern Basin and lies in the centre of it. Within the North French Scarplands the Kaiserslautern Basin is a sub-unit of the Saar-Nahe Upland and Tableland.

== Geography ==
The Landstuhl Marsh lies at an elevation of 200 metres above and is a bowl around 30 kilometres long and up to 7 kilometres wide running from Waldmohr in the southwest via Bruchmühlbach-Miesau, Ramstein-Miesenbach and Landstuhl to the city of Kaiserslautern in the northeast. In the north it is bounded by the North Palatine Uplands, which climb gradually from the lowland. In the south, by contrast, the Sickingen Heights form a very clear escarpment of about 200 metres height. The region is mainly drained by the Glan (in the west) and the 20-kilometre-long Mohrbach (centre), which rises not far south of the Moordamm Mill and empties into the Glan at Niedermohr. The streams in the far east flow into the Lauter, which is regionally also called the Waldlauter.
