= East Frisian Geest =

Coordinates: 53.1500°N 7.7000°E

- Classification: Handbook of Natural Region Divisions of Germany
- Level 1 Region: North German Plain
- Level 3 Region: 60 → East Frisian-Oldenburg Geest
- State(s): Lower Saxony
- Country: Germany

The East Frisian Geest (German: Ostfriesisch-Oldenburgische Geest) is a natural region major unit group (not quite synonymous with a "major region of the third level") in northwest Germany and northwestern Lower Saxony. Its character consists in the very varied juxtaposition of different landscape elements of the Northern Lowlands of which the East Frisian Geest is a part.

== Location and boundaries ==
The major unit group lies on the territory of the East Frisian counties of Aurich, Leer and Wittmund, the Oldenburg counties of Friesland, Ammerland, Oldenburg and Cloppenburg, the city of Oldenburg and the county of Emsland.
