= Gäu Plateaus =

Largest natural region in Baden-Württemberg, Germany

Coordinates: 49.0500°N 8.9240°E

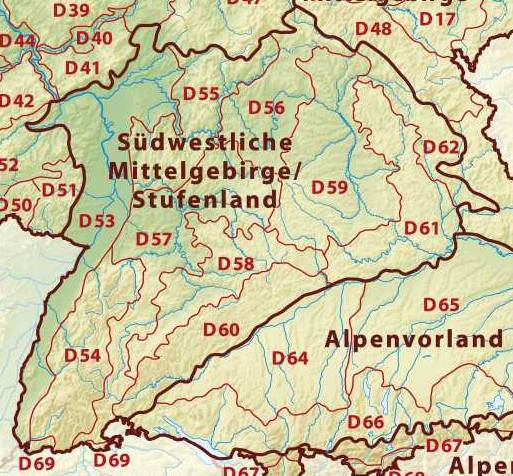
Neckar and Tauber Gäu Plateaus (D 57)

The Gäu Plateaus (German: Neckar- und Taubergäuplatten) form the largest natural region in the German state of Baden-Württemberg. Not surprisingly, the individual geographical units of this large region show considerable variations in climate and soil types. A common feature of the region, however, is its landscape of flat-topped hills of Muschelkalk, gently rolling tracts of loess and plateaus in which the layers of Muschelkalk have been covered by sediments of Gipskeuper and Lettenkeuper.

The Gäu Plateaus are the northwestern part of the Southern Scarplands.

== Location and geology ==
The Gäu Plateaus extend from the Upper Rhine to the Tauber valley. They are bordered to the west by the Black Forest and the Upper Rhine Plain, to the north by the Odenwald and the Mainfranken Plateaus, to the east by the Franconian and Swabian Keuper-Lias Lands and the Swabian Jura.

The underlying rock is made up of the layer of Muschelkalk, which is largely covered by Lettenkeuper or loess. The soils in the region are mostly of very high quality.

== Natural region subdivisions ==
In the Handbuch der naturräumlichen Gliederung Deutschlands ("Handbook of the natural regional divisions of Germany") which appeared from 1953 to 1962 the Neckar and Tauber Gäuplateaus are part of the German Central Uplands and contain the following subdivisions (the handbook's regional numbers are shown in brackets):

- Alb-Wutach Region (120)
- Baar (121)
- Upper Gäue (122)
- Neckar Basin (123)
- Stromberg and Heuchelberg (124)
- Kraichgau (125)
- Kocher-Jagst Plains (126)
- Hohenloher Ebene and Haller Ebene (127)
- Bauland (128)
- Tauberland (129)

== Natural regions of Germany according to the BfN ==
Based on the system of the Division of Germany into Major Natural Regional Units" (Gliederung Deutschlands in Naturräumliche Haupteinheiten) by the Federal Conservation Office (BfN) in 1994 the natural region is known as D57 Gäuplateaus, Neckar and Tauber Land (D57 Gäuplatten, Neckar- und Tauberland) but covers the same area.

== Name ==
The term Gau (in Alemannic German: Gäu) was originally used to refer to open, treeless water meadows. Today the term Gäu landscapes (Gäulandschaften) is mainly used to refer to the open terraces of the Swabian-Franconian Scarplands and so includes the areas of open, fertile arable fields.

The name Neckar and Tauber Gäu Plateaus is to be seen as a collective reference for the Gäu landscapes located in the catchment area of the river Neckar and its tributaries and which extend northeast to the catchment area of the Tauber.

== See also ==
- Natural regions of Germany as defined by the BfN
- Gäu (Baden-Württemberg) - a region largely coincident with the Gäu Plateaus

== Literature ==
- Kullen, Siegfried. Baden-Württemberg. 3., aktualisierte Auflage; Neubearbeitung. Klett, Stuttgart 1989 (Klett Länderprofile)
- Geyer, Otto F. & Gwinner, Manfred P. Geologie von Baden-Württemberg. E. Schweizerbart'sche Verlagsbuchhandlung, Stuttgart 1991.
- Borcherdt, Christoph. Bundesrepublik Deutschland. Wissenschaftliche Länderkunden Band 8. V. Baden-Württemberg. Darmstadt 1991.
