= Wendland and Altmark =

Natural region in Germany

Coordinates: 52.8800°N 11.4300°E

Wendland and Altmark (German: Wendland und Altmark), named after the German regions of Wendland and Altmark, is the name of a natural regional major landscape unit group in Lower Saxony and Saxony-Anhalt, North Germany. In the Handbook of Natural Region Divisions of Germany it is given serial number 86, the Bundesamt für Naturschutz gives the same region the serial number D29.

== Location ==
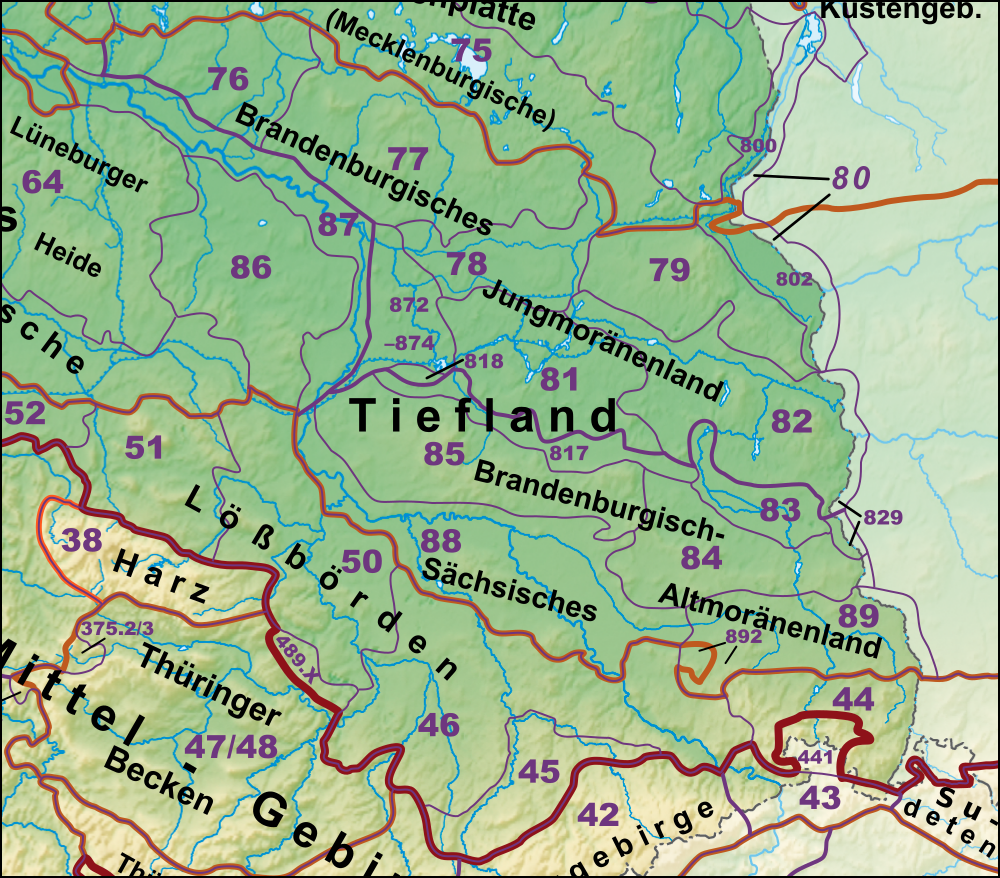
The eastern part of the North German Plain showing Wendland and Altmark as major landscape group 86

The natural region is located in the central part of the North German Plain, straddling the border between the states of Lower Saxony (only the county of Lüchow-Dannenberg) and Saxony-Anhalt (counties of Altmarkkreis Salzwedel, Stendal and Börde). It extends from Dannenberg in the north via Lüchow and Salzwedel to the Breslau-Magdeburg-Bremen glacial meltwater valley (including the River Ohre and Mittelland Canal) north of Magdeburg in the south; and from the Lower Saxony / Saxony-Anhalt border region northeast of Wolfsburg and the Drömling in the west as far as Stendal in the east. The landscape region is thus largely the same as the cultural landscape regions of Wendland and Altmark – albeit not universally. For example, the Drawehn region is socio-culturally mainly part of the Hanoverian Wendland, but is party of the Lüneburg Heath landscape unit, D28. The flood plain of the Elbe also forms a separate natural region.

The major landscape group of Wendland and Altmark (86) is bounded and bordered by the groups of Lüneburg Heath (64) to the northwest, the Weser-Aller Plain (62) to the southwest, the Eastern Harz Foreland and Börde (50) to the south and the Elbe Valley (87) to the east and north.
