= Saar-Nahe Hills =

Major natural region in Germany

Coordinates: 49.5220°N 7.3110°E

The Saar-Nahe Hills or Saar-Nahe Uplands (German: Saar-Nahe-Bergland or Saar-Nahe-Berg- und Hügelland) is a major natural region (major landscape unit group, level 3) in the German states of Rhineland-Palatinate and the Saarland. The region of hills and mountains covers an area of 4,185 km² (including the Sobernheim Valley) running from Saarbrücken, Kaiserslautern and the Palatine Forest in the south to the Hunsrück in the northeast. It contains the catchment area of the Nahe as far as Bad Kreuznach as well as small sections of the Middle Saar in the west.

== Location and boundaries ==
The Saar-Nahe Hills are located between the Hunsrück to the north-northwest, the Lower Naheland to the north, the Alzey Hills to the east-northeast (northwest edge of the Upper Rhine Plain, the Palatine Forest to the south and the Palatine-Saarland Muschelkalk Region to the west-southwest, the last-named lying on French soil in places.

It includes the river valleys of the Middle Saar in the southwest via Prims, Blies, Glan and Alsenz as far as the Lower Nahe to the northeast.

The largest town in the interior of the landscape is Idar-Oberstein in the north. Others include Kusel and St. Wendel in the centre and Birkenfeld nears its northeastern perimeter.

Considerably larger are the cities of Saarbrücken and Kaiserslautern on its southern edge; Bad Kreuznach on the northern side is also worthy of mention. Kirchheimbolanden lies to the east on the far side of it.
