= Palatine-Saarland Muschelkalk Region =

Coordinates: 49.1430°N 7.3630°E

The Palatine-Saarland Muschelkalk Region (German: Pfälzisch-Saarländische Muschelkalkgebiet) - or more accurately the Palatine-Saarland-Lorraine Muschelkalk Region (Pfälzisch-Saarländisch-Lothringisches Muschelkalkgebiet) - is a natural region of the third order in southwestern Rhineland-Palatinate and southern Saarland in Germany, and, on the French side of the border, in northern Lorraine and Alsace bossue. Its name is derived from the Handbook of the Natural Region Divisions of Germany, where it bears the index number 18.

Within the North French Scarplands it represents the Muschelkalk stage, but also transitions locally into bunter sandstone. Its core area is divided into the Zweibrücken Westrich (Upper Bunter Sandstone overlain by Lower Muschelkalk) in the east and the Saar-Blies-Gau with the Bliesgau (Upper Muschelkalk) in the southeast.

To the northwest lies the Merzig Muschelkalk Plateau near (Unterem) Saargau, which is separated however from the heartland by the Lorraine Keuper Lowland (Keuper), the Warndt (Bunter sandstone to Carboniferous) and the Saarkohlenwald (Carboniferous). Since 1969 this has been reckoned by the Institut für Landeskunde as part of the major region of the Gutland (major unit group 26), but on the Saarbrücken map (1972) from the same house and also in the internal Saarland classification by Quasten (1992) it is numerically part of group 18.
