= Kleiner Ravensberg =

Mountain in Brandenburg, Germany

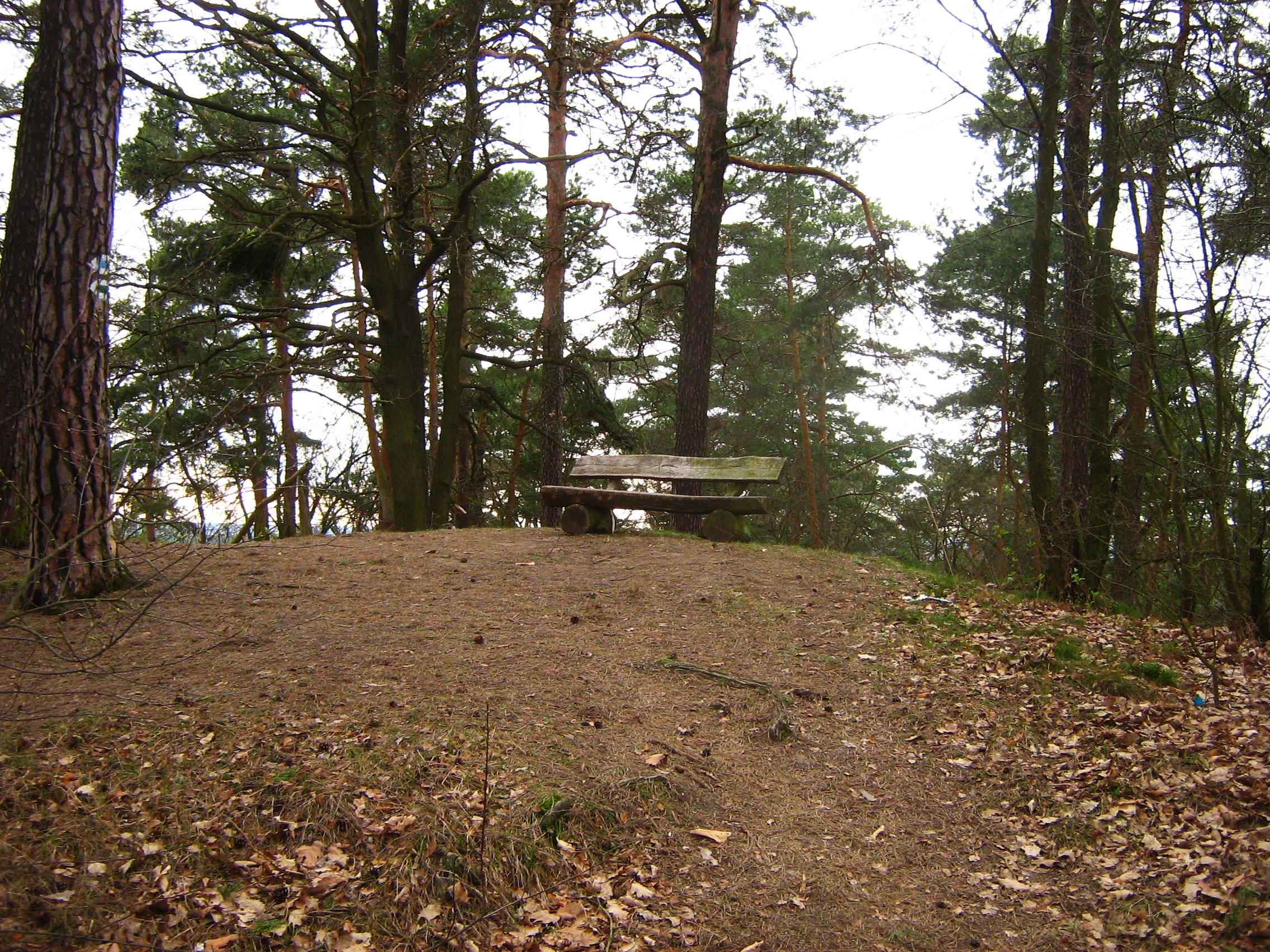
- Kleiner Ravensberg peak

Highest point
- Elevation: 114.2 m (375 ft)
- Coordinates: 52°21′38.14″N 13°3′57.26″E

Geography
- Location: Potsdam, Brandenburg, Germany

Kleiner Ravensberg is the highest elevation in the municipal area of Potsdam in Brandenburg, Germany with a peak at 114.2 m above sea level. It is located in a woodland called Ravensberge. The hill is part of a push moraine which was formed during the Weichselian glaciation.
