= North German Plain =

Plain in Germany

Coordinates: 53°36′N 10°24′E

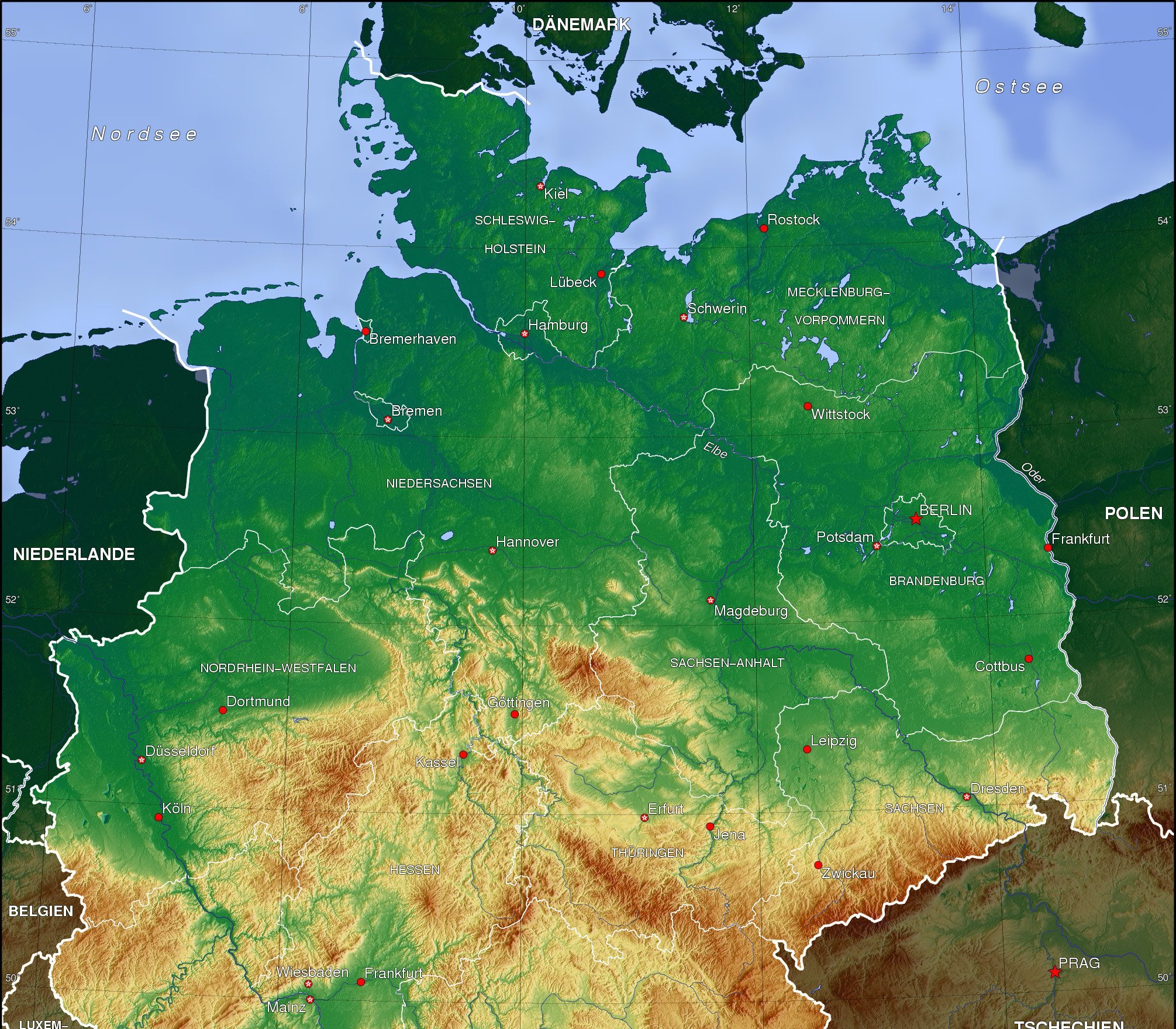
Physical map of Germany. The North German Plain largely corresponds to the dark green surfaces north of the tan-coloured low mountain ranges.

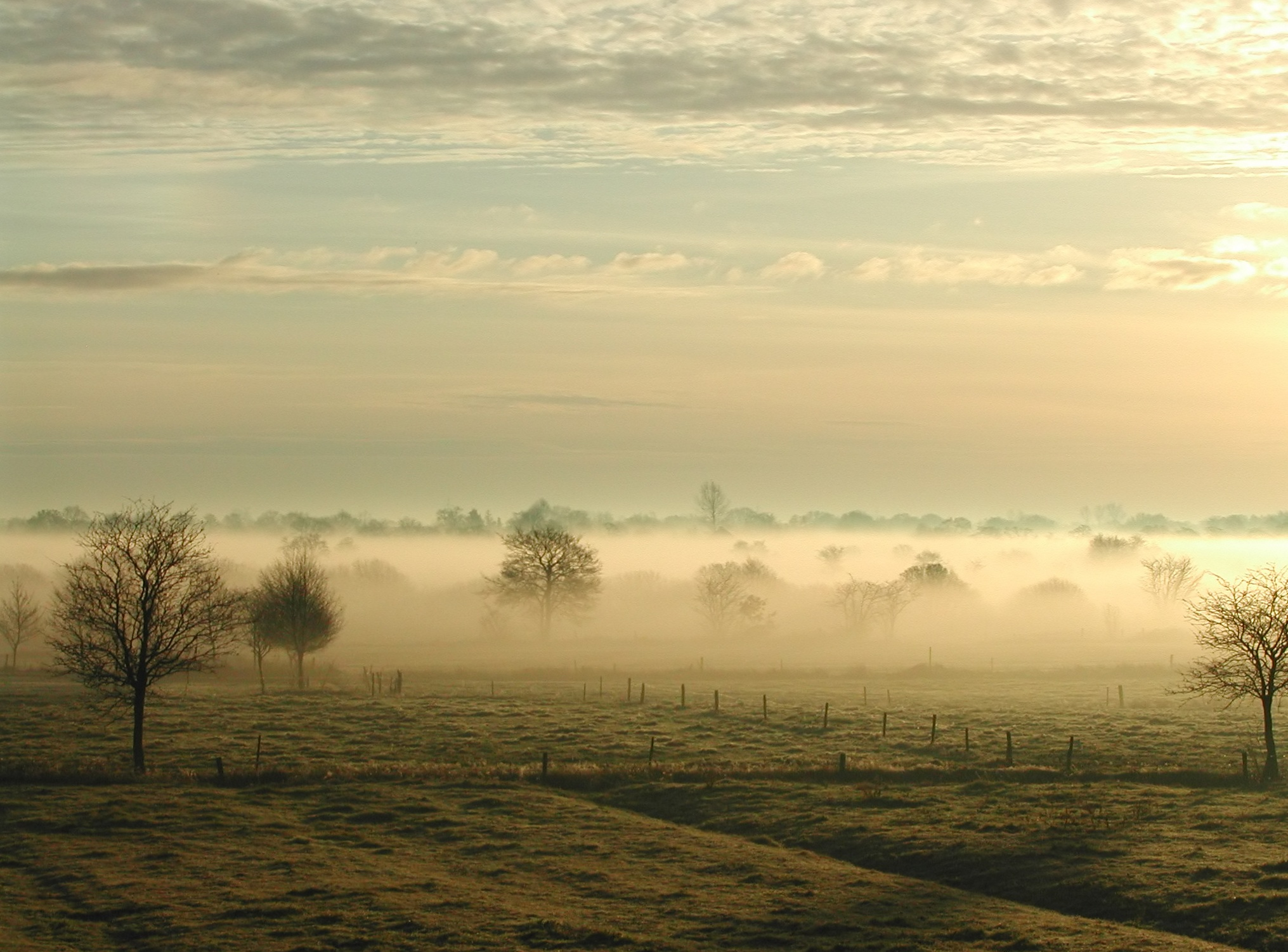
Morning fog in East Frisia

The North German Plain or Northern Lowland (German: Norddeutsches Tiefland) is one of the major geographical regions of Germany. It is the German part of the North European Plain. The region is bounded by the coasts of the North Sea and the Baltic Sea to the north, Germany's Central Uplands (die Mittelgebirge) to the south, by the Netherlands to the west and Poland to the east.

In the west, the southern boundary of the North German Plain is formed by the Lower Saxon Hills: specifically the ridge of the Teutoburg Forest, the Wiehen Hills, the Weser Hills and the Lower Saxon Börde, which partly separate it from that area of the Plain known as the Westphalian Lowland. Elements of the Rhenish Massif also act a part of the southern boundary of the plain: the Eifel, Bergisches Land and the Sauerland. In the east the North German Plain spreads out beyond the Harz Mountains and Kyffhäuser further to the south as far as the Central Saxon hill country and the foothills of the Ore Mountains.

== Landscape, soils and their formation ==
It is known that the North German Plain was formed during the Pleistocene era as a result of the various glacial advances of terrestrial Scandinavian ice sheets as well as by periglacial geomorphologic processes. The terrain may be considered as part of the Old or Young Drift (Alt- or Jungmoräne), depending on whether or not it was formed by the ice sheets of the last glacial period, the Weichselian Ice Age. The surface relief varies from level to undulating. The lowest points are low moorlands and old marshland on the edge of the ridge of dry land in the west of Schleswig-Holstein (the Wilster Marsh is 3.5 m (11 ft) below sea level) and in the northwest of Lower Saxony (Freepsum, 2.3 metres (7 ft 7 in) below sea level). The highest points may be referred to as Vistula and Hall glaciation terminal moraines (depending on the ice age which formed them) – e.g., on the Fläming Heath 200 m (660 ft) above sea level) and the Helpt Hills 179 m (587 ft)). Following the ice ages, rain-fed, raised bogs originated in western and northern Lower Saxony during warm periods of high precipitation (as influenced by Medieval Warm Period). These bogs were formerly widespread but much of this terrain has now been drained or otherwise superseded.

The coastal areas consist of Holocene lake and river marshes and lagoons connected to Pleistocene Old and Young Drift terrain in various stages of formation and weathering. After or during the retreat of the glaciers, wind-borne sand often formed dunes, which were later fixed by vegetation. Human intervention caused the emergence of open heath such as the Lüneburg Heath, and measures such as deforestation and the so-called Plaggenhieb (removal of the topsoil for use as fertilizer elsewhere) caused a wide impoverishment of the soil (Podsol). The most fertile soils are the young marshes (Auen-Vegen) and the Börde areas (Hildesheim Börde, Magdeburg Börde, with their fertile, loess soils). High-level bog peat can be found in the poorest soils, e.g. in the Teufelsmoor. In the loess areas of the lowland are found the oldest settlement locations in Germany (Linear Pottery culture).

The northeastern part of the plain (Young Drift) is geomorphologically distinct and contains a multitude of lakes (e.g. the Mueritz lake in the Mecklenburg Lake Plateau) which are vestiges of the last ice age. The retreating glaciers left this landscape behind around 16,000 to 13,000 years ago. In comparison, the dry plains of northwestern Germany (Lower Saxony, western Schleswig-Holstein, and the Bochum area of North Rhine Westphalia) are more heavily weathered and levelled (Old Drift) as the last large scale glaciations here occurred at least 130,000 years ago.

The region is drained by rivers that flow northwards into the North Sea or the Baltic and tributaries to the Rhine river that flows West. The Rhine, Ems, Weser, Elbe and Havel are the most important rivers which drain the North German Lowlands into the North Sea and created woods in their flood plains and folds, e.g. the Spreewald ("Spree Forest"). Only a small area of the North German Plain falls within the catchment area of the Oder and Neiße rivers which drain into the Baltic.

== Climate and vegetation ==
The North Sea coast and the adjacent coastal areas of the facing East and North Frisian Islands are characterised by a maritime climate. South of the coast, a broad band of maritime and sub-maritime climate stretches from the east coast of Schleswig-Holstein to the western edges of the Central Uplands. To the south east and east, the climate becomes increasingly subcontinental: characterised by temperature differences between summer and winter which progressively increase away from the tempering effect of the ocean. Locally, a drier continental climate can be found in the rain shadow of the Harz and some smaller areas of upland like the Drawehn and the Fläming. Special microclimates occur in bogs and heathlands and, for example, in the Altes Land near Hamburg, which is characterised by relatively mild temperatures year round due to the proximity of the North Sea and lower Elbe river, providing excellent conditions for fruit production.

Azonal vegetation complexes of moors, riparian forests, fens and water bodies originally stretched along the rivers Ems, Weser, Elbe, Havel and Spree. Distinctive salt marshes, tideflats and tidal reed beds in the estuaries existed permanently in the tidal zone of the North Sea coast. The natural vegetation of the North German Plain is thought to have been forest formed mainly by the dominant species European beech (Fagetalia).

== Natural regions ==
According to Germany's Federal Agency for Nature Conservation, the BfN, the North German Plain consists of the natural regions listed below. Where possible, their names have been derived from authoritative English-language source(s), as indicated by the references.

* D01 Mecklenburg Coastal Lowland
* D02 Northeast Mecklenburg Lowland (including the Szczecin Lagoon)
* D03 Mecklenburg Lake Plateau Hinterland
* D04 Mecklenburg Lake Plateau
* D05 North Brandenburg Plateaux and Upland
* D06 East Brandenburg Plateau
* D07 Oder Valley
* D08 Lusatian Basin and Spreewald
* D09 Middle Elbe Plain
* D10 Elbe-Mulde Plain
* D11 Fläming Heath
* D12 Brandenburg Heath and Lake District
* D13 Upper Lusatian Plateau
* D14 Upper Lusatia
* D21 Schleswig-Holstein Marsh
* D22 Schleswig-Holstein Geest (older moraines above marsh level)
* D23 Schleswig-Holstein Morainic Uplands (more recent moraines)
* D24 Lower Elbe Marsch
* D25 Ems and Weser Marsh
* D26 East Frisian Geest
* D27 Stade Geest
* D28 Lüneburg Heath
* D29 Wendland and Altmark
* D30 Dümmer and Ems-Hunte Geest
* D31 Weser-Aller Plain
* D34 Westphalian Lowland or Basin
* D35 Lower Rhine Plain and Cologne Lowland

== Military importance ==
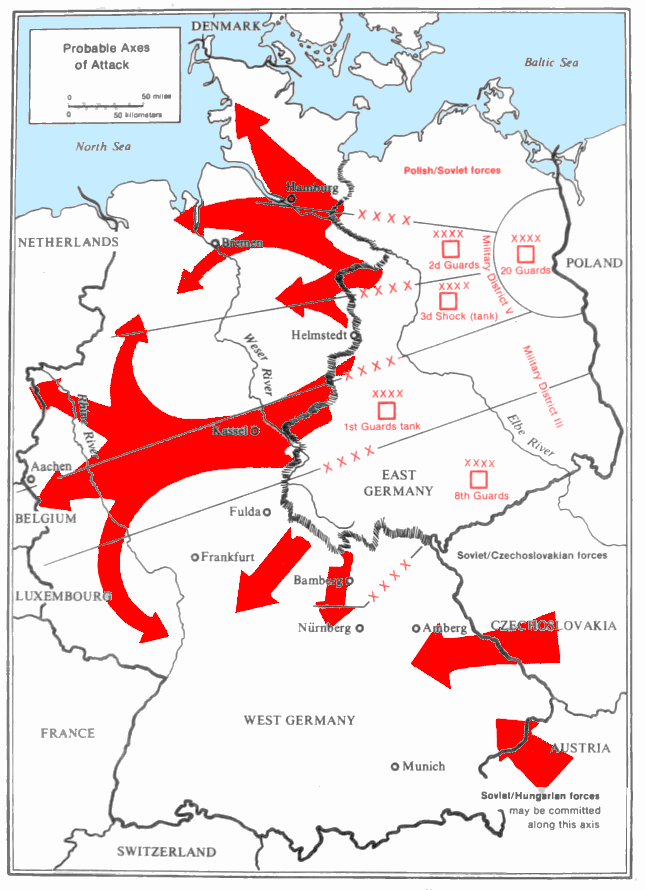
Probable axes of attack of the Warsaw Pact through the Fulda Gap and the North German Plains according to the U.S. Army

During the Cold War, in the event of war between NATO and the Warsaw Pact, NATO military strategists identified the North German plain as an area that could have been used for two of three major invasion routes into Western Europe by Warsaw Pact forces. The third route was the Fulda Gap further south. The North German plain routes were the best attack options for an attacking army. However, the Fulda Gap option was seen as the most likely invasion route because of easier and closer access to tactical and strategic goals important for an invasion of Western Europe. Of the two North German plain invasion options, the southern route of the attack, which had the better strategic opportunities, would have been led by the Soviet Third Shock Army. The plain's geography, which makes it suitable for the deployment of armored and mechanized maneuver, led to it being identified as a major invasion route into West Germany. The defense of the Plain was the responsibility of NATO's Northern Army Group and Second Allied Tactical Air Force, made up of German, Dutch, Belgian, British, and some US forces.

== See also ==
- Natural regions of Germany
- Northern European Plain
