= North French Scarplands =

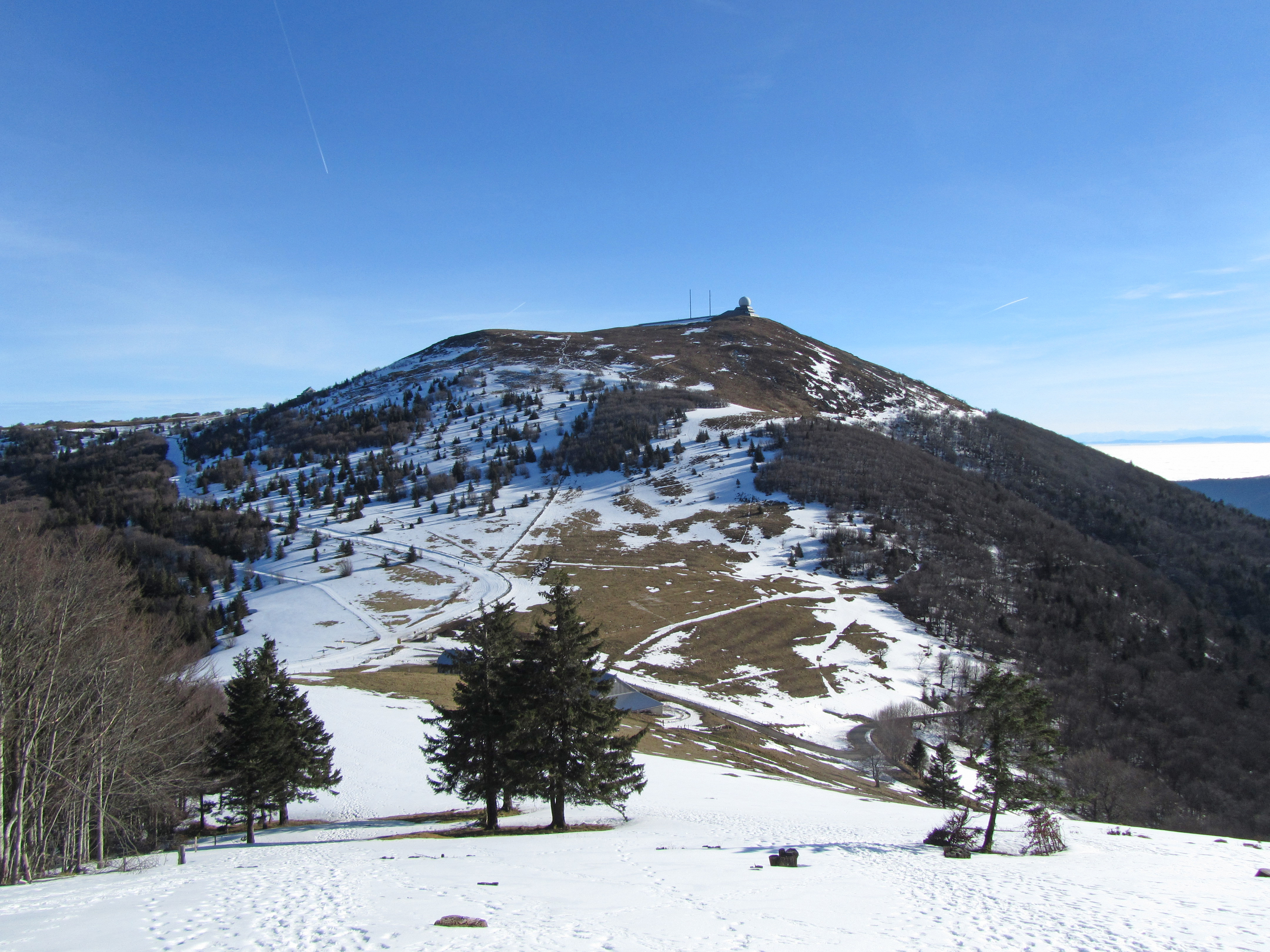
The Grand Ballon, highest peak of the North French Highlands, in the Alsatian part of the Vosges

The North French Scarplands (German: Nordfranzösische Schichtstufenland ; French : Hautes Terres du Nord-Est) is a scarp landscape comprising various highlands and uplands in northern France, eastern Belgium, Luxembourg and western Germany. It is separated from the South German Scarplands to the east by the Upper Rhine Graben. To the north it is bounded by the Hunsrück and the Rhenish Massif.

The German part of the region, which is limited to the states of Rhineland-Palatinate and Saarland, also goes by the less common name of the Saar-Nahe Uplands and Table Land (Saar-Nahe-Berg- und Tafelland). According to work by the former Federal Office of Regional Planning (Bundesanstalt für Landeskunde), it is a 2nd-level major landscape.

The best known and highest low mountain range in the region is the Vosges in northeastern France, which transitions to the north into the Palatine Forest.

== See also ==
- Scarpland
