= South German Scarplands =

Landscape in Switzerland, Bavaria and Baden-Württemberg

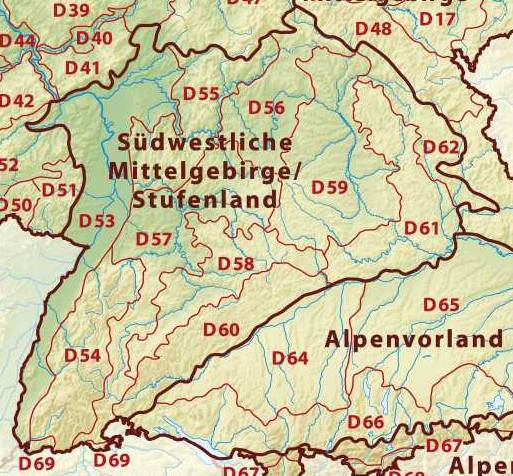
South German Scarplands

The South German Scarplands is a geological and geomorphological natural region or landscape in Switzerland and the south German states of Bavaria and Baden-Württemberg. The landscape is characterised by escarpments.

== Name ==
It is variously referred to in the German literature as the:

- Südwestdeutsches Schichtstufenland (Southwest German Scarplands)
- Südwestdeutsche Schichtstufenlandschaft (Southwest German Scarp Landscape)
- Schwäbisch-Fränkische(s) Schichtstufenland (Swabian-Franconian Scarpland(scape))
- Süddeutsche(s) Schichtstufenland(schaft) (South German Scarpland(scape))

== Location and short description ==
The South German Scarplands run (from north(-northeast) to south(-southwest)) more or less between the southern Rhön, the Spessart, the Odenwald and the Black Forest in the west, the Franconian Jura in the east, the Swabian Jura to the southeast and the northeastern foothills of the Jura to the south.

The wooded west and northwest-facing scarps drop sharply towards the Rhine Rift Valley and the Rhine-Main Plain, whilst the dip slopes fall comparatively gradually towards the (north-)east into the depressions beyond which lie the Thuringian Forest, Thuringian Highland, Franconian Forest, Fichtel Mountains, Upper Palatine Forest and Bavarian Forest. Similarly the Swabian and Franconian Jura descend quite gently towards the south(east) to the Danube valley, whilst the Swabian Jura, for example, drop very steeply to the north(-northwest) from the so-called Albtrauf - the top of the main scarp.

== Anticlinal scarplands between Paris and the Bohemian Forest ==
The South German Scarplands are part of a scarp landscape that stretches from the Bohemian Forest to the Paris Basin. This anticlinal terrain is a result of the tectonic bulging of the earth's surface between Paris and the Bohemian Forest. Following the sinking of the Upper Rhine Rift Valley in the area of maximum uplift and flexure, scarplands were formed to the east and west of the rift, their layers of rock all dipping away from the Upper Rhine. These regions are the known in the west as the North French Scarplands (in northern France and the Palatinate) and in the east as the South German Scarplands (in Baden-Württemberg and northern Bavaria). These two great areas of scarpland are linked in the south by the scarps of the Tafeljura on the High Rhine, as well as those in the region of Basel, the Ajoie and in the rest of the Belfort Gap. In the area of the Faltenjura, around the southern perimeter of the Upper Rhine Rift in the Sundgau (Pfirter Jura), the two scarplands (unfolded layers) are separated from one another by a short distance.

The rock layers involved were formed in the Triassic and Jurassic periods of the Mesozoic era. The sedimentary beds were gently tilted and exposed to the surface and erosion and weathering occurred differentially based on their composition. The less resistant rocks eroded faster, retreating until the point they were overlain by more resistant rock resulting in the cuestas characteristic of scarplands.

== Geographical formation ==
The present scarp landscape was formed during the Mesozoic era. About 350 million years ago a large basin emerged which was surrounded by mountain ranges and ridges. Prior to that red sandstone had accumulated in the numerous depressions, the erosion products from the Variscan mountains. In the Triassic and Jurassic periods the region sometimes lay above sea level and sometimes below it, so that alternate beds of continental and marine deposition were laid down.

The typical, present-day, escarpments have emerged since the Neogene geological period, after the Upper Rhine Rift Valley was formed as a result of plate tectonic processes about 30 million years ago. The regions either side of the rift valley were violently uplifted, producing the Black Forest on the German side and the Vosges on the French side. This uplifting had the consequence that in the entire South German scarpland region the strata no longer lay horizontally, but were tilted away from the Rhine rift descending from west to east. As a result of the lifting and tilting of these sedimentary layers, weathering set in, which the more resistant layers of rock withstood for longer than the softer layers. For example, the clays were relatively easily eroded and formed gentler gradients, whilst the harder sandstones or limestones were less susceptible to weathering and formed the steeper scarps. The resulting geological structures brought the various geological strata to the earth's surface where they could be easily observed and assessed.

The most important strata are named after the geological periods of the Mesozoic era. These are, in order of their occurrence from west to east: Bunter sandstone, Muschelkalk, Keuper, Black Jura, Brown Jura and White Jura. Bunter sandstone occurs predominantly in the Northern Black Forest and has ensured the continued existence of large forested areas, because of the low productivity of its soils. Muschelkalk underlies the fertile Gäu landscapes of the Baar as far as Lower Franconia. The Keuper, with its relatively poor soils again, lends its name to the scarplands of the Keuper-Lias Uplands. The most prominent Jurassic scarps - notably the Swabian and Franconian Jura – are formed by the White Jura and, in the southwest, also the Brown Jura.

== Human use and economic importance ==
The Upper Rhine Rift Valley and the Mainz Basin have relatively fertile arable land as a result of ice age deposits of loess. In the uplands, however, the soils only have low to medium productivity. In places where limestone reaches the surface, karstification has resulted in the formation of caves which drain almost all of the precipitation. As a result, these upland areas have very little surface water. This is the case to some extent with the Swabian and the Franconian Jura, which run north of the upper course of the Danube. Vineyards are concentrated in the lower regions of the scarplands, whilst forestry plays an important role in the higher mountain areas.

== See also ==
- Cuesta – for the creation of scarp landscapes
- Natural regions of Germany
- Palatine-Saarland Muschelkalk Region

== Literature ==
- Dickinson, Robert E. (1964). Germany: A regional and economic geography (2nd ed.). London: Methuen. ASIN B000IOFSEQ.
- Meynen, E., Schmidthüsen, J., Gellert, J., Neef, E., Müller-Miny, H., Schultze, J. H.(ed.): Handbuch der Naturräumlichen Gliederung Deutschlands. Band II, Bad Godesberg 1959–1962.
- Rothe, P. Die Geologie Deutschlands. 48 Landschaften im Portrait. Wissenschaftliche Buchgesellschaft, Darmstadt 2005.
- Dongus, H. Die Oberflächenformen Südwestdeutschlands. Borntraeger, Berlin, Stuttgart 2000.
- Geyer, O. F. and Gwinner, M. P. Geologie von Baden-Württemberg. E. Schweizerbart'sche Verlagsbuchhandlung, Stuttgart 1991.
