= Schleswig Geest =

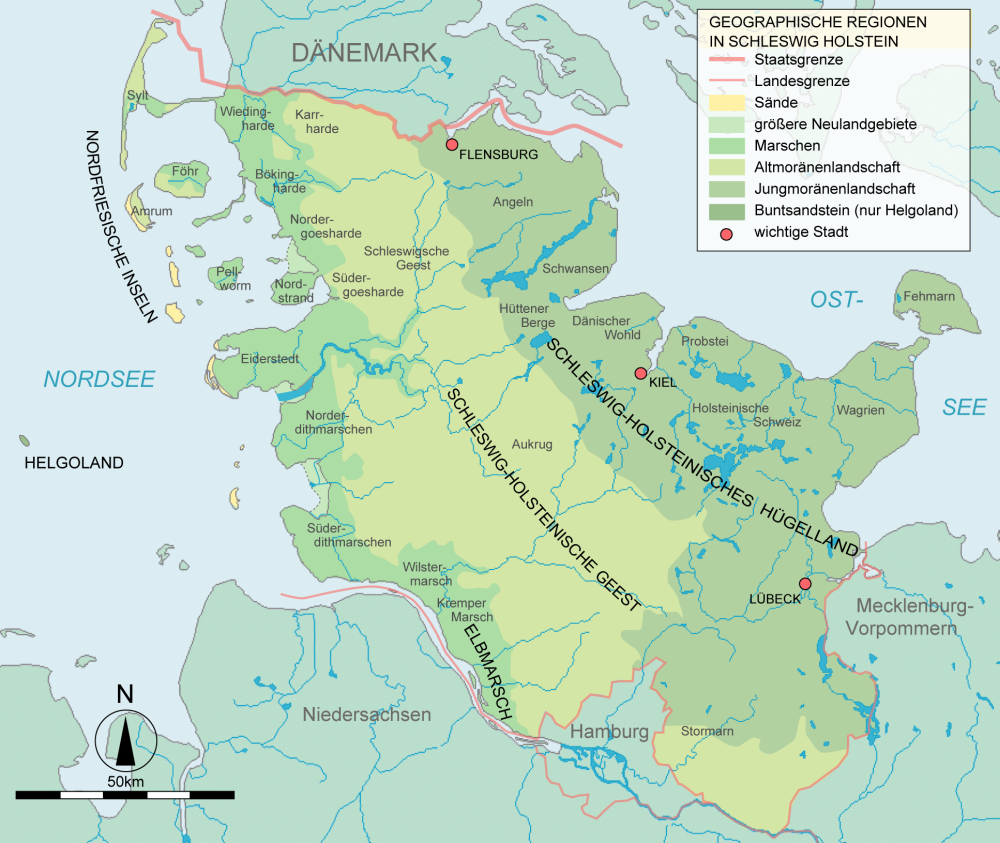
Landscapes in Schleswig-Holstein

The Schleswig Geest (German: Schleswigsche Geest, Danish: Slesvigsk Gest, Midtslesvig or Midtsletten) is a cultural-geographic region situated between the North Frisian marshlands to the west and the hilly landscapes of Angeln and Schwansen to the east. To the south, it transitions into the Eider-Treene Depression. Geest is one of the three landscape forms in Schleswig-Holstein. Its sandy soils contrast with the fertile soils of the marshes and hill country. The Schleswig Geest was settled in the 6th century by the Danes and Jutes. The Ochsenweg ("Ox Road"), one of the most important communication arteries in the North European region, runs through the Schleswig Geest. The so-called Geest Ridge (Geestrücken) was the best strip of land for a north-south route. Whilst the marsh was too soft and wet for long-distance roads on which to move cattle and armies, the Angeln was just too hilly.

== Other Geest areas in Schleswig-Holstein ==
- Geest islands (Geestkerne) of Amrum, Föhr and Sylt (Geestkern Islands)
- Heide-Itzehoe Geest with the Dithmarschen Geest, Hohenwestedt Geest and Münsterdorf Geest Island

== Sources ==
- Jochen Missfeldt: Die Geest (in "Deutsche Landschaften") S. Fischer Verlag, ISBN 3-10-070404-5

== Sources ==
- Jochen Missfeldt: Die Geest (in "Deutsche Landschaften") S. Fischer Verlag, ISBN 3-10-070404-5
