= Handbook of the Natural Region Divisions of Germany =

The Handbook of Natural Region Divisions of Germany (German: Handbuch der naturräumlichen Gliederung Deutschlands) was a book series resulting from a project by the former German Federal Institute for Regional Studies (Bundesanstalt für Landeskunde) to determine the division of Germany into natural regions. It was published in several books over the period 1953–1962. Around 400 authors, mostly geographers, took part. This natural region division of Germany is still used, with amendments, today.

== See also ==
- Natural regions of Germany

== Sources ==
- Emil Meynen, Josef Schmithüsen (editors: Handbuch der naturräumlichen Gliederung Deutschlands. Bundesanstalt für Landeskunde, Remagen/Bad Godesberg, 1953–1962 (9 issues in 8 books, updated map, 1:1,000,000 with major units, 1960).
