= Natural region =

Area defined by common geography, geology and climate

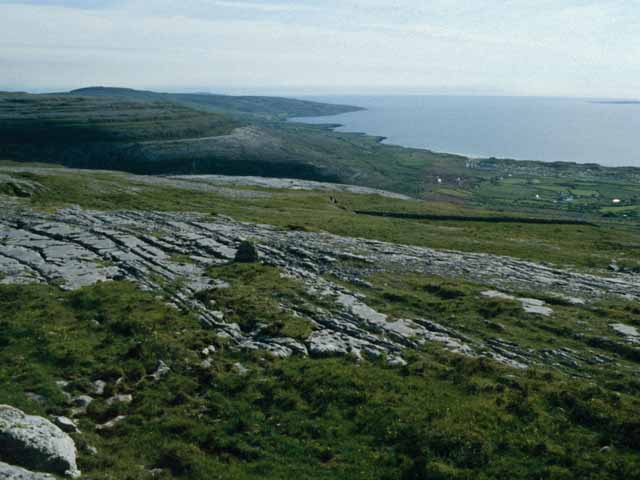
The Burren, a vast natural region in Ireland; view of the western scarp

A natural region (landscape unit) is a basic geographic unit. Usually, it is a region which is distinguished by its common natural features of geography, geology, and climate.

From the ecological point of view, the naturally occurring flora and fauna of the region are likely to be influenced by its geographical and geological factors, such as soil and water availability, in a significant manner. Thus most natural regions are homogeneous ecosystems. Human impact can be an important factor in the shaping and destiny of a particular natural region.

== Main terms ==
Natural regions of Chile

The concept "natural region" is a large basic geographical unit, like the vast boreal forest region. The term may also be used generically, like in alpine tundra, or specifically to refer to a particular place.

The term is particularly useful where there is no corresponding or coterminous official region. The Fens of eastern England, the Thai highlands, and the Pays de Bray in Normandy, are examples of this. Others might include regions with particular geological characteristics, like badlands, such as the Bardenas Reales, an upland massif of acidic rock, or The Burren, in Ireland.

== By country ==
- Natural regions of Burundi
- Natural regions of Chile
- Natural regions of Colombia
- Natural regions of Germany
- Natural regions of Venezuela
