= Robert Oskar Julius von Görschen =

German business lawyer (1829-1914)

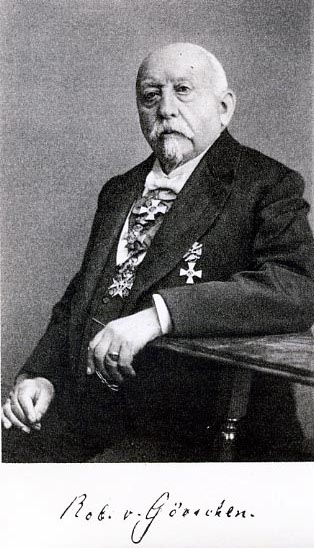
Robert Oskar Julius von Görschen

Robert Oskar Julius von Görschen (born 22 November 1829 in Aachen; died 10 January 1914 in Aachen) was one of the Aachen region’s most successful business lawyers, and an initiator of many social and cultural institutions.

== In the service of Aachen and Munich insurance company ==
After his law studies, von Görschen planned to pursue a career as a judge. He was already an assistant lawyer in the regional court when he decided, in 1861 to enter in the Aachen and Munich Fire Insurance Company, a predecessor organization of today's Aachen Münchener Versicherungs-AG (a subsidiary company of the AMB Generali). First, he took over for two years as head of the Subdirektion Berlin before he finally (in 1863) was appointed as a legal officer in the Aachen headquarters. He held this post for seventeen years and was already a consultative member of the Board of directors. On 9 April 1881, he was appointed as a full member and from 1887 until his death he served as Chairman of the Board of Directors. He was the representative of the insurance company both internally and externally, and under his leadership, the company developed a towering reputation.

During this time, Robert von Görschen (thanks to his extraordinary gift of giving speeches, and numerous contacts) was instrumental in instigating a spate of tremendous achievements in the German and international businesses, this insurance company acquired. He was playing a key role in building until 1900, with over 56 new foreign representatives of his company, but also in the planning and implementation of projects for funding of social and cultural institutions in the region. In these early years of the industrial age, he worked vigorously for the social component of support from the Insurance Company. He ensured that each half of the annual profit should be reserved for social and cultural purposes, as the founder of the company, David Hansemann (1790-1864), had decreed in 1824.

Due to Robert von Görschen's co-operation with General Director Friedrich Adolph Brüggemann, it was also possible that the Friedrich-Wilhelm Foundation of the University of Aachen (today RWTH Aachen), could be founded (in 1866) and that a secure financial footing was guaranteed. The Friedrich-Wilhelm Foundation continues until the present day, awarding scholarships and prizes for research. In 1870, the university also received a guarantee fund in the amount of 1.3 million Mark (Prussian vereinsthaler) and a construction fund of a further one million Mark annually, and 10,000 Mark as earmarked grants. This enabled von Görschen and Friedrich Adolph Brüggemann (on 10 October 1870) to found the organization "Association for the advancement of capacity of work", a kind of labour office of that time. In addition, both also supported the fire insurance companies in many towns and cities throughout the Rhineland in 1870, in the acquisition of one free fire syringe engine for each (of the company Josef Beduwe, Feuerspritzen, Gelb- und Glockengießerei (fire engine, brass and bell foundry) from Aachen, which resulted in a sell of this equipment for over 5000 Marks. Robert von Gorschen and the subsequent directors of the insurance company, Richard Trostorff and Adolf Brüggemann, were significantly responsible for ensuring that the Aachen Einhard-Gymnasium (on 1 May 1886) and the Aachen David Hansemann Monument, together with the area surrounding the monument (on 29 August 1888) and the Aachen Bismarck Tower (on 22 August) could all be inaugurated.

== The services of the Eschweiler Coal Mining Company (EBV) ==
Robert von Görschen, at the recommendation of his father (privy councillor Karl Heinrich von Görschen, (1784-1860)), became the chairman of the supervisory board of Eschweiler coal mining company (EBV), and he also became a member of the Executive Council of the EBV. On 26 October 1897 he was chosen to be a member of the Supervisory Board, and from 1907 to 1909 he became deputy chairman, and until his death in 1914 he filled the position of chairman of this body. At that time the various mines around Aachen and in neighbouring countries were individual companies and no longer competitive in the growing market. Due to Robert von Görschen, in 1907 a merger between the Associations for Mineral Coal Company (Vereinigungsgesellschaft für Steinkohlenbau im Wurmrevier), further individual mines and the Eschweiler Coal Mining Company (EBV) the EBV became one of the biggest mine companies of Western Germany.

He was also honoured in 1903 by the City Würselen, by having the main shaft of the mine Gouley and according to Council Decision of 21 November 1953 an adjacent street named after him.

== Further activities and honours ==
Robert von Görschen was, between 1884 and 1909 Municipal city councillor of Aachen. In addition, from 31 January 1864 he joined the Aachener Casino association and was (initially in 1886 and most recently from 1902 to 1909) its president. For his achievements, he was decorated as follows:

- Order of the Red Eagle 3rd class with swords
- Order of the Crown of Prussia, 2nd class
- Merit Order of the St Michael of Bavaria, 2nd class
- House Order of Henry the Lion of Brunswick, 2nd class
- House Order of Vigilance or the White Falcon, 2nd, class

== Family ==
Robert Oskar Julius von Görschen was born to the old German noble family Von Görschen. He originated from the estate Gut Klau in Aachen, and was married to Elise Helene Friederike Brüggemann (1833-1917) and had with her four sons and two daughters. His son Robert Walter Richard Ernst von Görschen became Vice-President in Aachen and another son, Bruno Hans Otto Friedrich von Görschen (1865-1939) became a Judicial and Legal councillor of justice, in 1914 a legal advisor in the “Aachen and Munich Insurance Company”, and in 1924 chairman of the Supervisory Board of Aachen Reinsurance Company.

== Sources and literature ==
- Arens/Jansen: „Geschichte des Clubs Aachener Casino“ (History of the Club Casino of Aachen); Nr. 486, page 170; 2nd Edition 1964
- Aachen and Munich Fire Insurance – Memorial about the 75-year-festivity of the corporate 1825-1900; Edition by Georgi, Aachen, 1900
- Aachen and Munich Fire Insurance – Memorial about the 100-year-festivity of the corporate 1825-1925; Print corporate Aachen, 1925
- Oskar Stegemann: “100 year coal mining company of Eschweiler and his prehistory”; Edition 1938, Eschweiler
