= Otto Friedrich Ferdinand von Görschen =

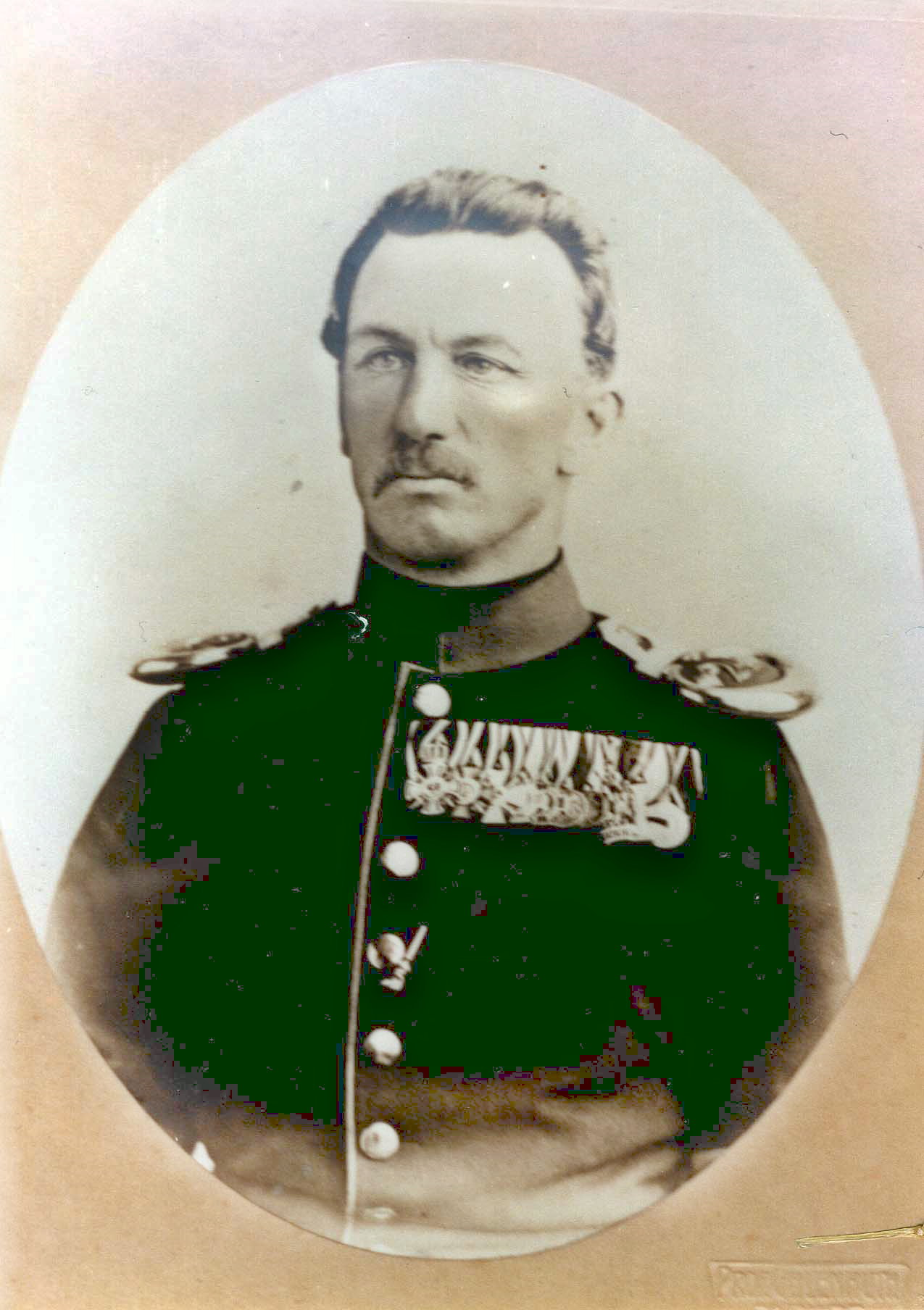
Otto Ferdinand von Görschen

Otto Friedrich Ferdinand von Görschen (12 April 1824 in Neuruppin – 8 June 1875 in Eberswalde) was a Royal Prussian lieutenant colonel and highly decorated war hero of the 19th century.

== Military career and merits ==
Much like his father lieutenant colonel August Friedrich von Görschen (1794−1866), Otto Friedrich Ferdinand von Görschen firstly took up a career as a commissioned officer in the 24th regiment in the German infantry from the 6th Division, and was promoted there in 1864 to the position of Captain and Chief of the 6th Company. On 16 January 1866 he was promoted to become a Major, and at the same time he was posted to the 8th Brandenburg infantry Regiment of Prince Friedrich Karl of Prussia (1828-1885) from the same Division.

Otto von Görschen was instrumental in the Second Schleswig War in 1864 Battle of Dybbøl during the transition to Alsen Battle of Als and the assault to the Düppeler Schanzen (rempal of Dybbøl).

For his previous merits, inter alia, he was decorated as follows:

- House Order of Hohenzollern with swords
- Order of the Red Eagle with swords
- Prussian Order of the Crown with swords
- Order of the Iron Crown of Austria

According to rankings of 1868, Otto von Görschen and Alfred von Lewinski (1831-1906) were the only officers in the Prussian Army with the above three swords. As commander of the Second Battalion of the Brandenburg Infantry Regiment, he later was a recipient of the Iron Cross first class.

After two injuries in 1864 and 1870, and incipient disease from 1872, he was exempted from military service. He was married to Emma Clara Helene Riedel (1845−1924), daughter of the archivist, historian and politician Adolph Friedrich Johann Riedel (1809-1872). From this marriage three children were born. After his early death, Emma Riedel von Görschen married again to Eduard Tempeltey (1832−1919).

== Sources ==
- Archive documents Hans-Thorald Michaelis
- Records of the family von Görschen by Horst Friedrich Ernst von Görschen, Cranz (now Zelenogradsk) 1933
- Theodor Fontane: poems by Theodor Fontane, 21-23 editions, p. 277/278
- Theodor Fontane: Quitt, 2 Auflage, S. 224 Editions, p. 224
- Hugo Bartsch: Images from Arch of Pictures from my Life, Cotta’sche Buchhandlung (bookstore) second edition
