= Robert Walter Richard Ernst von Görschen =

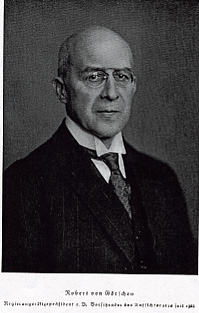
Robert von Görschen

Robert Walter Richard Ernst von Görschen (born 27 March 1864 in Aachen, died 4 January 1936 in Aachen) was a member of the Prussian Upper Governing Council and government Vice-President.

== Career ==
After his graduation in autumn 1884 in Kleve, Robert von Görschen studied law and Political Sciences in Munich, Marburg, Heidelberg and Berlin. Here he passed his first examination in law on 13 May 1888. From 9 June 1888, Robert von Görschen served as a trainee barrister in the District Court of Eschweiler, and was sworn in on 22 June 1888. He completed his internship in Eschweiler at the Country Court in Aachen.

On 9 September 1890, he began his career as a junior barrister with the Government of Aachen. Three years after his second examination in law he was appointed as assessor of the government in Aachen, working later with the Government in Kassel, with the district office in Stormarn and probably still with the district office in Wandsbek, before (on 4 November 1895) going back to the government in Kassel. Finally, on 1 August 1902 he was promoted as a governmental councillor. A month later, he worked first as acting and, from 23 February 1903 as a definitive district administrator in Altenkirchen. On 10 October 1912, he was finally appointed as a chief councillor of government of Cologne. At the last stop of his career, he was promoted, on 1 June 1919, to vice president of government of Aachen.

In 1923, he was, together with the President of Aachen, William Rombach (1884-1973), and the Police President Fritz von Korff (1891-1987) captured, due to passive resistance against the supreme authority at that time by Frenchmen and Belgians in the occupied Rhenish Republic. On 23 January 1923, they were released, but with the stipulation that they should not enter certain areas. The "Inter-Allied Rhineland Commission" initially deported them into the unoccupied area around Wuppertal-Elberfeld and were placed, several days later in Königswinter and Altenkirchen /Westerwald. After constantly travelling back and forth, Aachen President Rombach and his vice president von Görschen finally ended up, in February 1923 in the town hall of Wuppertal-Barmen a branch office of the Government of Aachen and both could now resume their governmental duties. After intensive discussions with the occupying authority, after the end of the struggle under the occupation of the Ruhr, the banishment was withdrawn a year later and von Görschen was, on 12 March 1924 (together with Wolfgang Rombach) again returned to Aachen. Here, Robert von Görschen, now exhausted and frustrated, applied for retirement. This claim was initiated on 1 July 1924.

== Additional activities ==
In addition to his professional career as a high administrative officer, Robert von Görschen was also instrumental in a number of other areas in Aachen, mostly in management positions in various active associations and institutions. These were as follows:

- 22 November 1919: member of the Club Casino of Aachen
- 1920: member of the ‘’recreation society Aachen’’
- 16 February 1898: Knight of Honor of the Order of St. John, the German branch of the Knights Hospitaller
  - 1906: Foreman of the “Rhine Cooperative” of the Knights Hospitaller and Convention member
  - 24 June 1908: Knight of Justice of Saint John
  - From 1924: also a master at the Friedrich-Wilhelm-Foundation Bonn, today “Johanniter-Hospital” Bonn
- 26 June 1920: to 14 October 1934 Chairman of “Luisen-Hospital” in Aachen
- 9 May 1924: to 4 January 1925: Chairman of the Supervisory Board Aachener und Münchener Fire Insurance Company (predecessor organisation of the AachenMünchener Versicherungs AG, today AMB Generali) and Chairman of the Supervisory Board of AM numerous related companies.
- 1927 to 1934: Chairman of the Museum Association of Aachen
- 1932 to 1933: President of the Rotary Clubs of Aachen
- 1935: appointed councillor of the city of Aachen

== Awards ==
- For his merits in the passive resistance, he was presented, on 22 May 1925, with an honorary citizen certificate.
- "On the occasion of the return of his seventieth birthday and in grateful appreciation of his great contributions to the design and development of the university" von Görschen was, on 27 March 1934, created an honorary senator of the RWTH Aachen.
- He was also honoured on 28 March 1934 by the police president in Aachen, by having a street named after him.

== Family ==
Robert von Görschen originated from the old German and Thuringia noble family Von Görschen of Protestant-style. He was the son of Robert Oskar Julius von Görschen (1829−1914) and Elise Brüggemann (1833−1917). Von Görschen was married to Emy Rosalie Marie Honigmann (1871−1944) and they had one son and one daughter. The son Hans-Wolf von Görschen was an honorary senator of the University of Greifswald, banker and businessman in Cologne and Rotterdam and a liaison in the "Kreisau Circle".

== Personal and literary sources ==
- Archive documents RWTH Aachen
- Arens/Jansen: short vita about von Görschen; Nr. 878. page. 227, 1964
- Annette Fusenig: „Wie man ein Weltfest des Pferdesports erfindet – Das Aachener Spring- und Fahrturnier von 1924 bis 1939“ (How to invent a world champion of equestrian sports – the show jumping and carriage Driving competition in Aachen from 1924 until 1939), Dissertation 2004
- Alfred von Reumont: „100 Jahre Erholungsgesellschaft Aachen“ (100 years recreation society Aachen); Festschrift 1939, Aachen, page 90
- Albert Huyskens: „Die Aachener Kulturvereine wissenschaftlicher Richtung“, (he Aachen Cultural Societies on Science); Yearbook of RWTH Aachen, 1950, page 170, 196
- Arens/Jansen: „Geschichte des Clubs Aachener Casino“ (History of the Club Aachen Casino); Nr. 486, page 170 and 878, page 227; 2nd Edition 1964
- Bernhard Poll: “History of Aachen”, page 288, 318; 1965, Aachen
- Horst Romeyk: “Die leitenden staatlichen und kommunalen Verwaltungsbeamten der Rheinprovinz 1816-1945“, (The state and communal executive officers in the Rhine Province 1816-1945), Düsseldorf 1994, page 472
- Klaus Habetha. „Wissenschaft zwischen technischer und gesellschaftlicher Herausforderung“ (science between technical and social challenge), Aachen, 1995, page 667
- „Memorial of the Aachen and Munich fire insurance“; Aachen, 1925, page 65, 70;
- Grünnagel. “In memoriam Robert von Görschen” - speech by the obsequies 1936; City Archive Aachen LG 510
