= Görschen family =

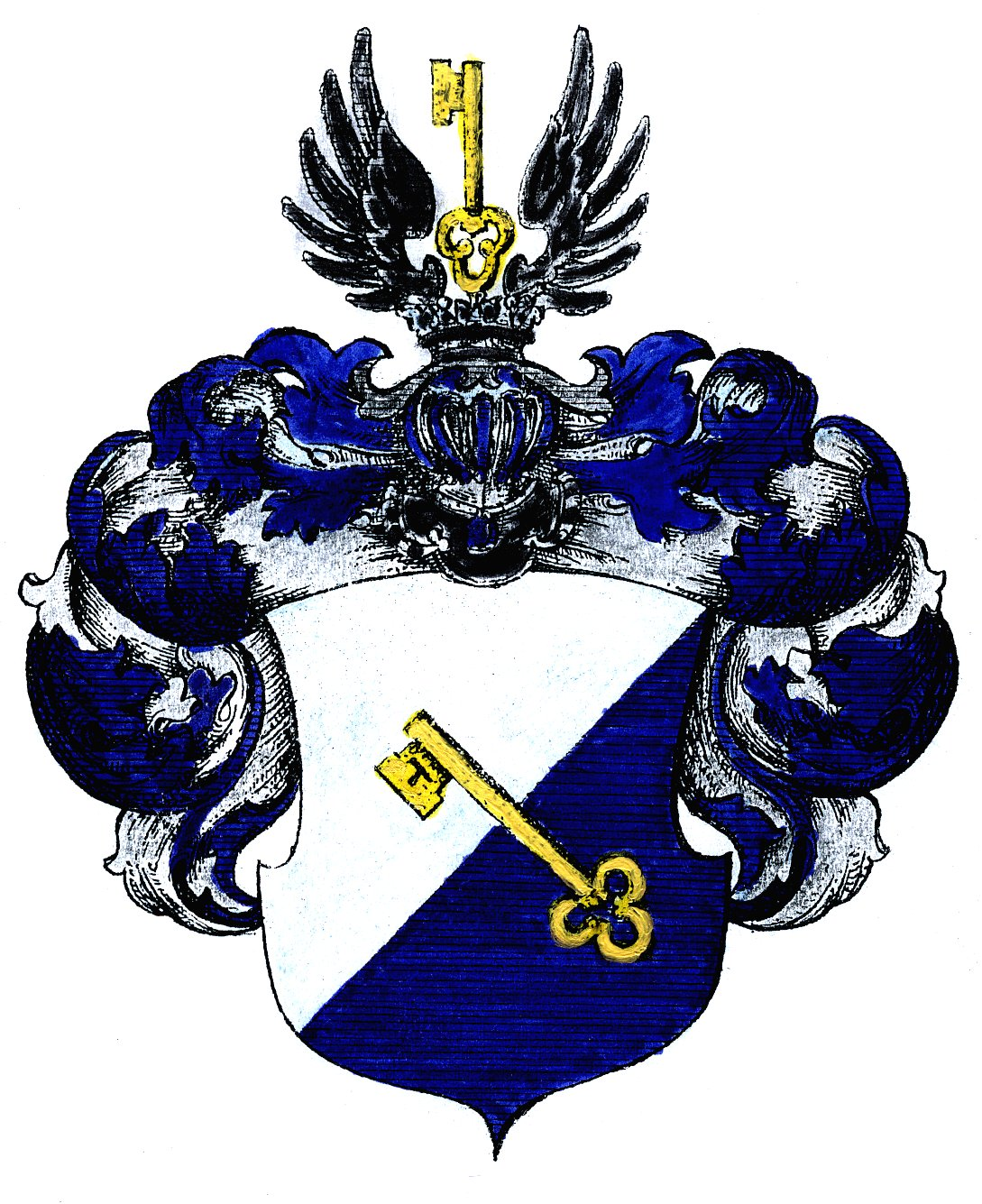
Görschen family coat of arms

The Görschen family is an old German noble family originating from the 12th century. The family name derives from its original headquarters: the place Goresin (Görschen) or even from an older "oppida goresin" (Görschenburg / Görschenfestung) near Lützen, which was already appointed by Bishop Thietmar of Merseburg in the year 998, whereas the name itself is Sorbian origin and translating as "damp". Naming variations are de Goresin, de Gorsne, de Gorssen and von Goerschen.

== Coat of arms ==
A golden key on a blue background with the top facing downwards; on the helmet a key is depicted between two and six black cock feathers. Several variations of the colours of the key and the shield are available in different sources.

== Family chronicle ==
The first recorded individual bearing the name was Conradus de Gorsne who was recorded as a “witness” on 22 June 1186. The first recorded ancestor of the living von Görschen descendants was Petris de Görsene (first mentioned on 12 June 1271) and the family distributed across Prussia in the course of the next few generations. Due to the marriage of Eva von Görschen, daughter of Lorenz von Görschen (1575–1630), Lord of Groß-Görschen, with Erasmus von Bothfeld, Lord of Burgwerben, the family von Görschen belong to the ancestors of some European royal and noble houses.

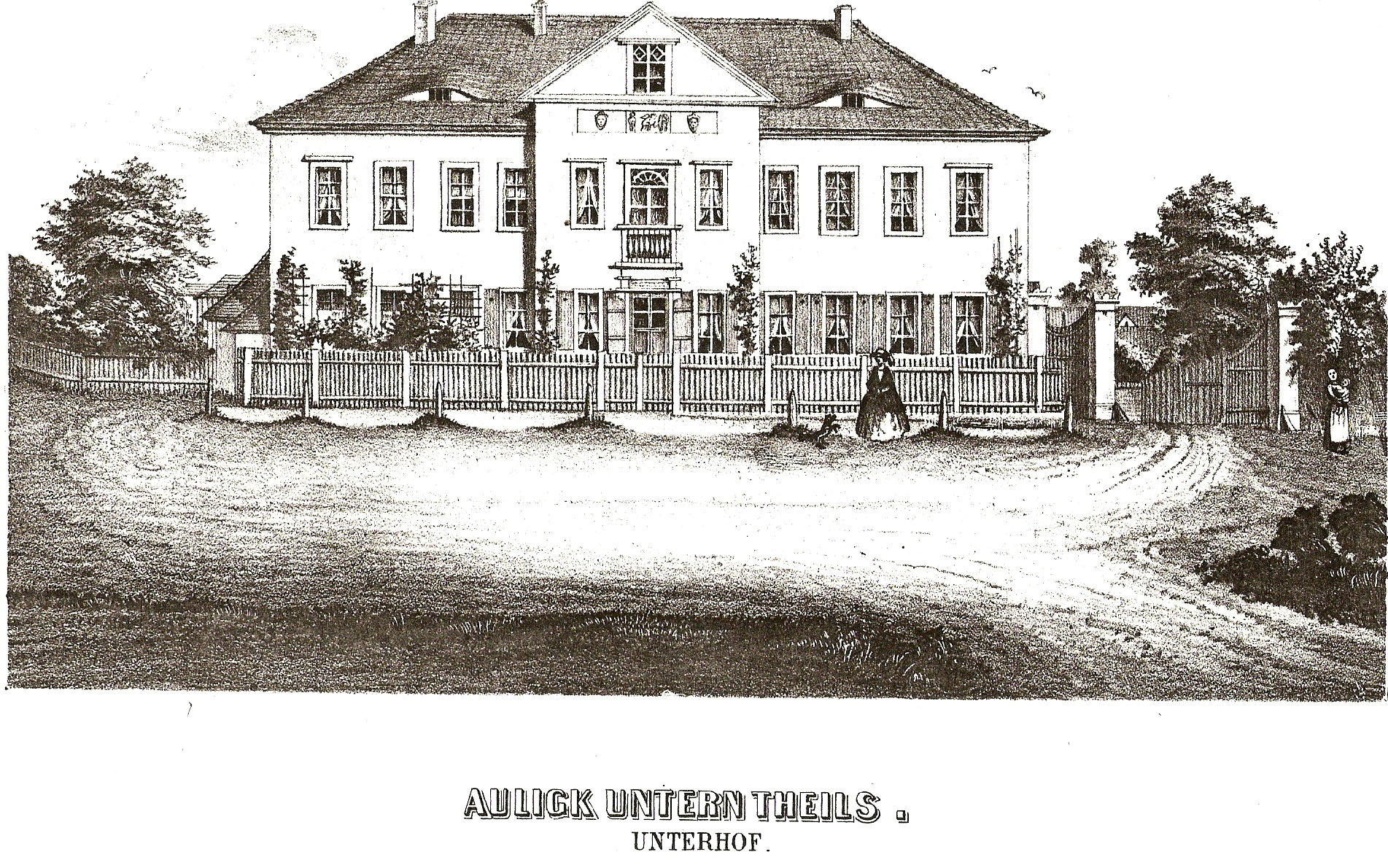
stately home Auligk, domain of the family between 1650 and 1914

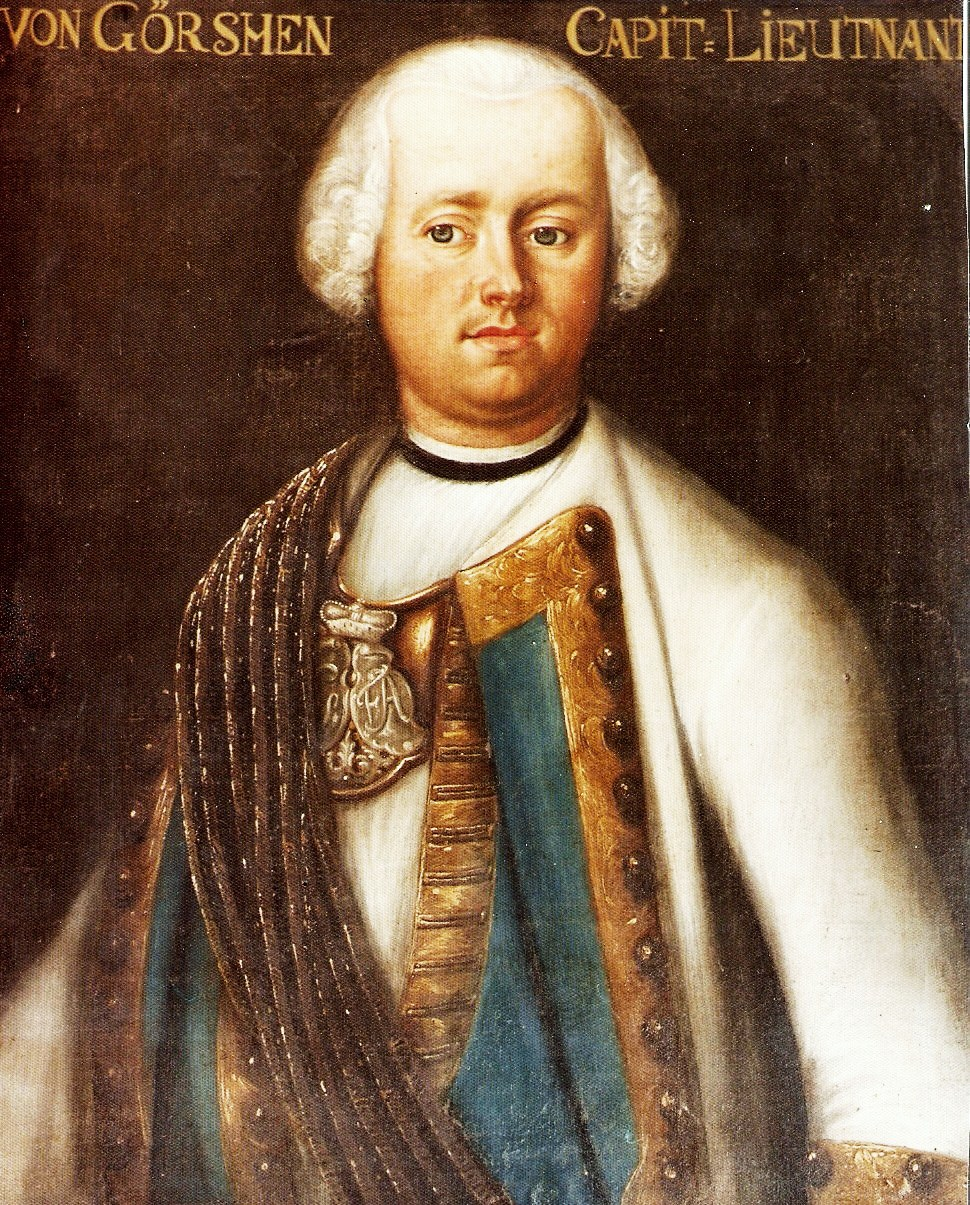
Captain Georg Christoph von Görschen

From Captain Georg Christoph von Görschen (1707–1748) there was the development of three main lines; a line in the area around Auligk/Groitzsch and Fürstenwalde still exists to this day, while a second line originating on the German-Dutch border near Aachen, and a third line in the Neuruppin area were also recorded. From the second line originated a number of family members in especially important administrative posts. After the middle of the 19th century some of them settled down in London and were successful business people there. As Protestants, many of the members of this line also were honorary knights or members of the Order of St. John, which is the German Protestant branch of the Knights Hospitaller. The third line held several generations of high-ranking officers who achieved honours for their military merits.

In today's society the name has all but vanished; less than fifteen bearers of the name survive to this day.

== Significant and famous family members ==
- Karl Friedrich Alexander Baron von Görschen (1738–1818) was major General in the Imperial Army of the Habsburg monarchy and commandant of the 52nd infantry Regiment of Archduke Anton Victor of Austria (1779–1835). He was a successful commander during the War of the First Coalition in the region of Piedmont in the Battle of Rivoli 1797 and also during the War of the Second Coalition around Taufers (South Tyrol), Susch (Engadin) and in the Battle of Novi in 1799 against Napoleon Bonaparte’s army.
- Karl Heinrich von Görschen (1784–1860), Privy councillor of the Aachen government
- Otto Friedrich Ferdinand von Görschen (1827–1875), Royal Prussian lieutenant colonel and highly decorated war hero; instrumental in the Second Schleswig War in 1864.
- Robert Oskar Julius von Görschen (1829–1914), Successful businessman and lawyer; initiator of many social and cultural institutions; was decorated with several medals by German authorities.
- Robert Walter Richard Ernst von Görschen (1864–1936), Governmental Vice-President and Upper Governing Councillor in Aachen; Knight of the Order of St. John.
- Bruno Hans Otto Friedrich von Görschen (1865–1936), Legal Aachen and Munich Fire Insurance Company; Chairman of the Supervisory Board of Aachen Reinsurance Company; Knight of the Order of Saint John.
- Hans Wolf von Görschen (1894–1945), Banker and businessman in Cologne and Rotterdam, honorary senator of the University of Greifswald; Knight of the Order of Saint John; appointed as a resistance fighter in the Kreisau Circle; arrested in December 1944 and executed by the Gestapo in April 1945. (Hans Wolf von Görschen in the National Archives: )
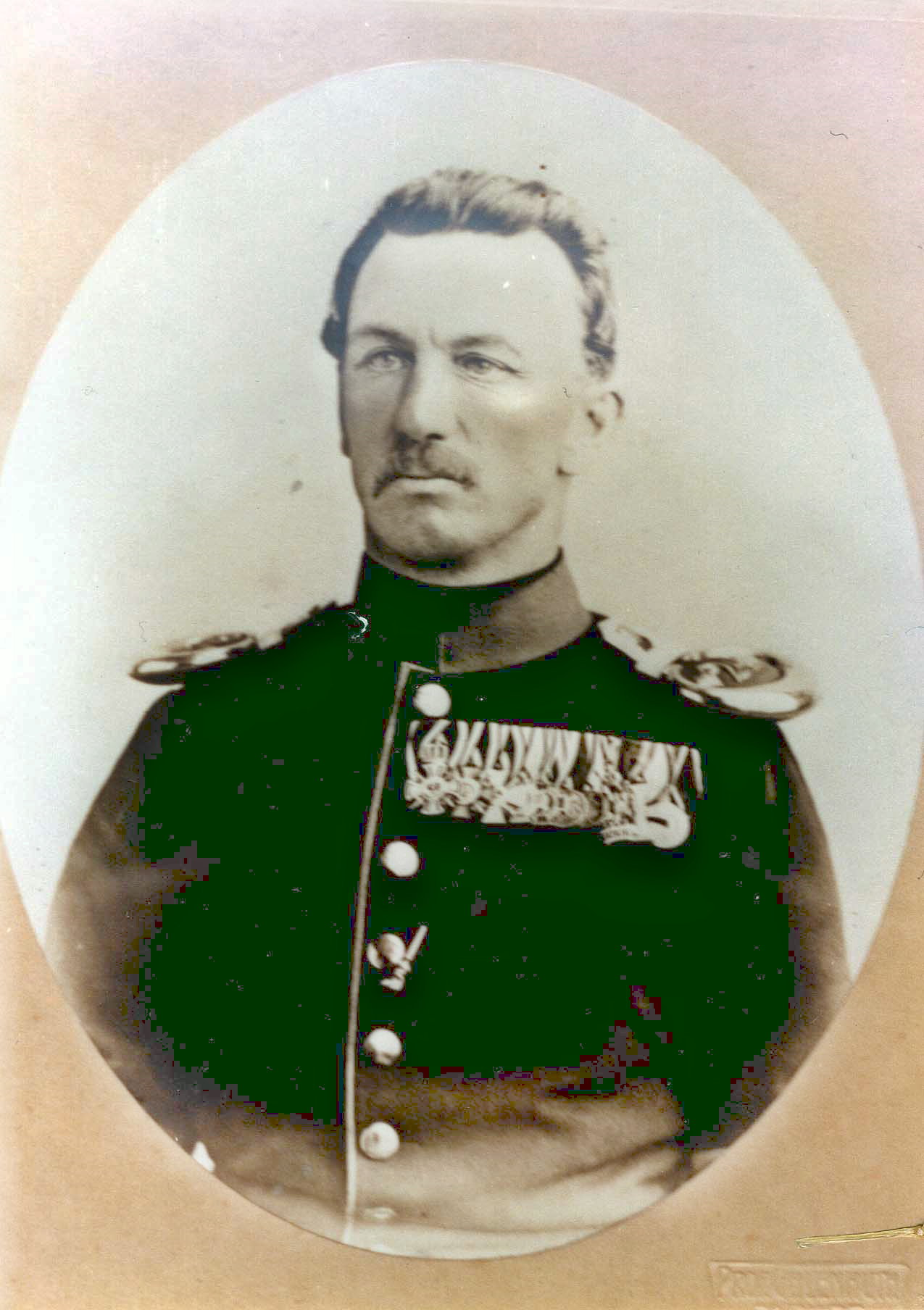
Otto von Görschen, Royal Prussian lieutenant colonel Neuruppin

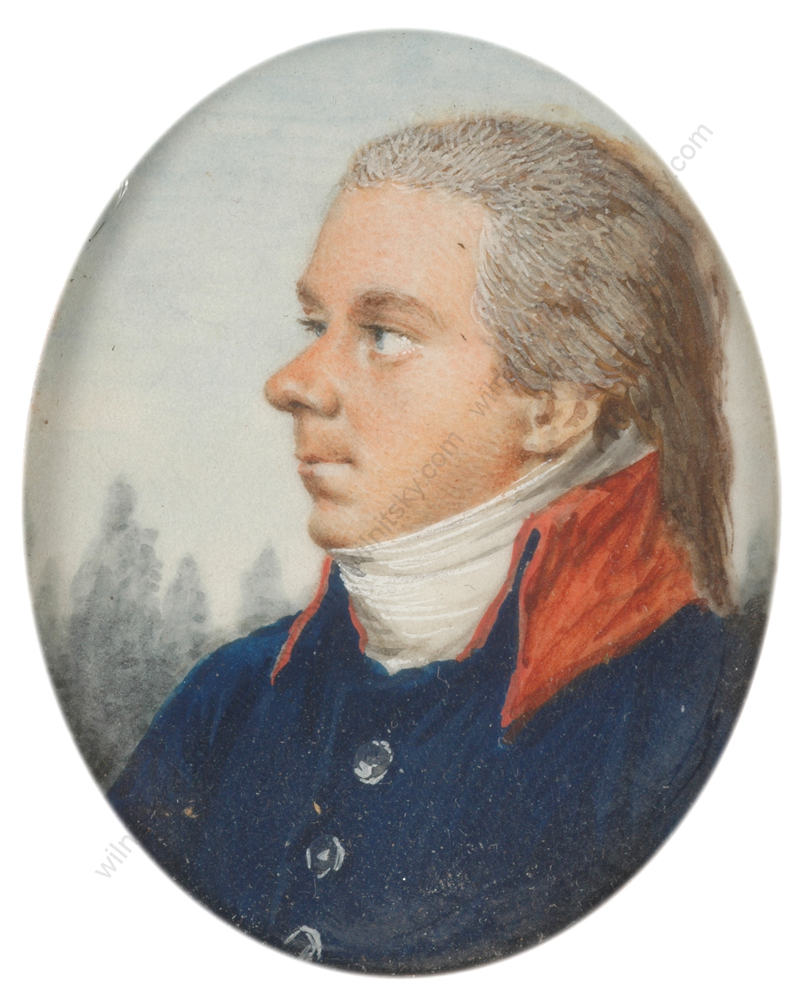
Otto Heinrich von Görschen, forest officer and father of Karl Heinrich von Görschen and Louise von Görschen, spouse of Friedrich von Raumer

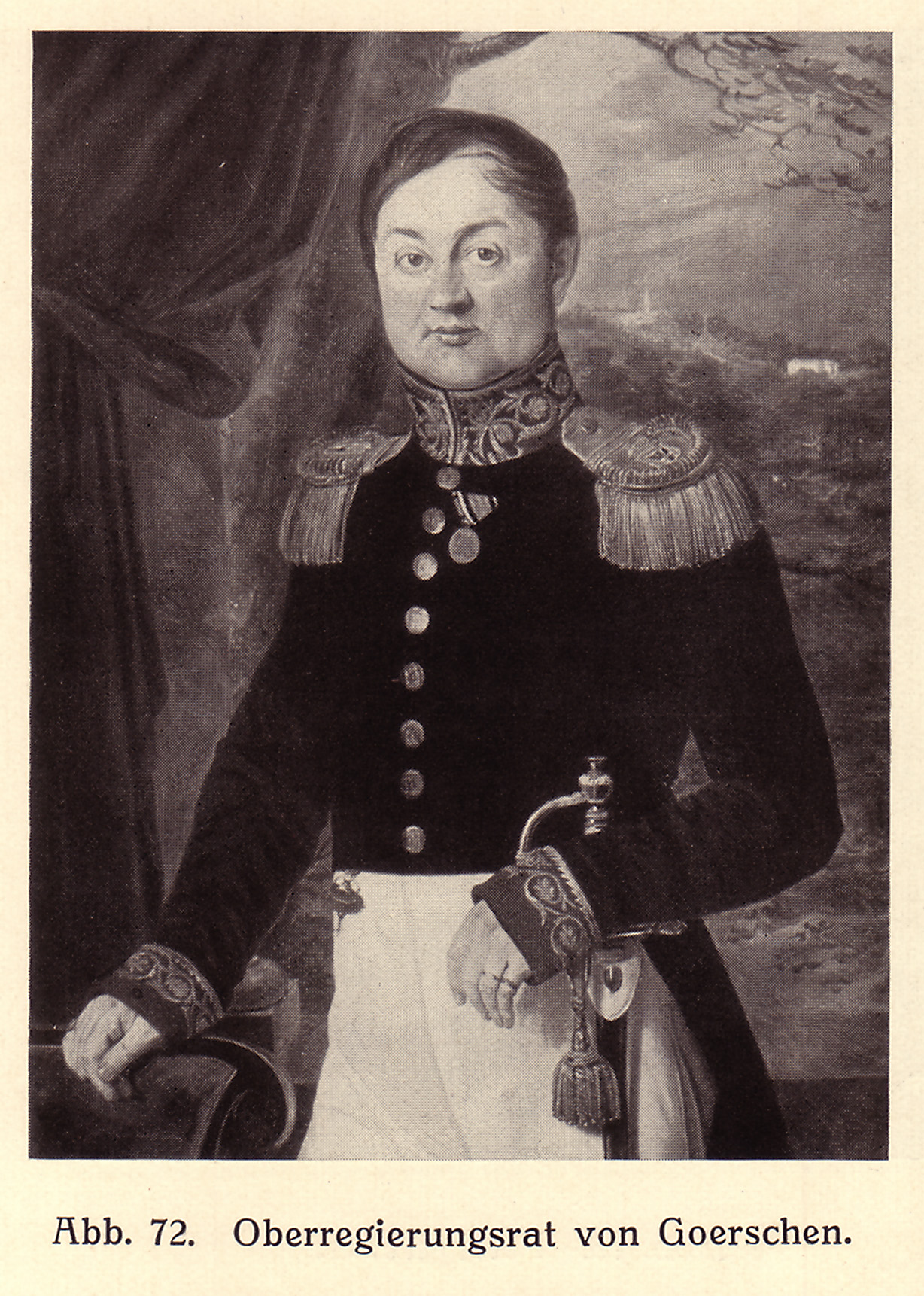
Karl Heinrich von Görschen, Privy Councillor of the Aachen government and ancestor of the Görschen-Family in Aachen;

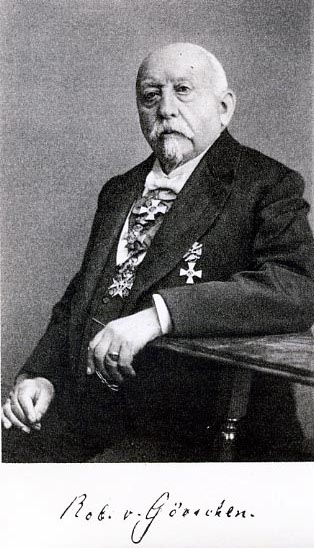
Robert von Görschen, Legal Advisor Aachen

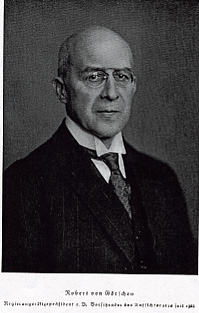
Robert von Görschen, Governmental Vice-President Aachen

== Sources ==
- Almanach de Gotha, Jhrg. 26, 1926, Publisher Justus Perthes
- Master table of the family von Görschen
- Archive documents Hans-Thorald Michaelis
