= Hans-Thorald Michaelis =

German historian (1925–2004)

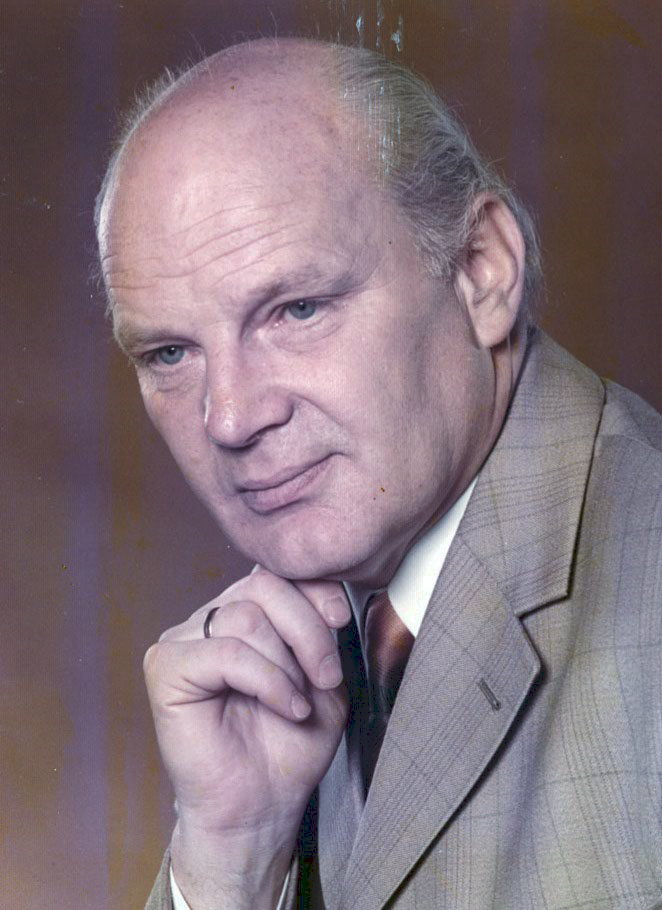
Hans-Thorald Michaelis

Hans-Thorald Michaelis (born 24 April 1925 in Hanover, died 18 December 2004 in Aachen) was a German historian, germanist and genealogist.

== Life and career ==
After his studies in history, germanistics, philosophy and Protestant religion in Frankfurt am Main, Mainz, Göttingen and Marburg he started a career as a grammar school teacher. In 1963 he awarded his doctor in philosophy with the theme: “Die Grafschaft Büdingen im Feld der Auseinandersetzungen um die religiöse und politische Einheit des Reiches 1517−1555“ (The County Büdingen in the field of conflicts on religious and political unity of the realm 1515−1555).

Between 1966 and 1971 he was in charge of the constitution and direction of the evening grammar school in Wiesbaden. In these politically turbulent times he very early campaigned for this new German “second-chance or adult education” and for the democratisation in school and along with this the student council.

Since 1965 until 1973 contemporaneous with the above-mentioned function he got involved as an active member in the Wiesbaden Social Democratic Party of Germany (SPD) and he published a work on the history of the 100-year-existence of the party in their festschrift. In 1977 after his activities in the SPD, Michaelis was cofounder of a local political party “Freie Wählergemeinschaft” (FWG) (free voters union) of Wiesbaden and also member in the “Frankfurt round table”, a political, economic and liberal club for discussions with very important persons (VIPs).

In context with his long-time work in the Protestant church he campaigned also for the ecumenism of church very soon and took part in 1968 on the 4th plenum of the ecumenical World Council of Churches in Uppsala. In 1976 he joined the club: “Brüderlicher Kreis” (brother circle), a Christian religious open community with Protestant imprint, which has its origin in the confraternity of Baltic States, founded 1926.

After his retirement in 1982 he was engaged in the constitution and management of the archive from the “Deutscher Schützenbund” (German Shooting Sport Federation) in Wiesbaden, which is the head organisation for German Schützenverein. During this time he wrote more than ten papers about the historical background of the German Schützenverein and organised several expositions.

Since his early days Michaelis was interested in genealogy. On the basis of already available information and documents regarding several branches of his family he travelled to different regions of Germany and overseas in order to complete these data. Thus it was possible to generate a databank with more than 10,000 persons of the corresponding families Michaelis, von Boehmer, Von Görschen and Weitbrecht. In context with these searches he published more than 50 essays and papers including their historic circumstances and backgrounds. On the basis of these researches he could prove that all descendants in direct line of his grand-grandmother Mary Barbara Rennie (1836−1920) from the Rennie-Clan of Kilsyth, are also direct descendants from the pilgrims father William Bradford (1590−1657). Therewith the mentioned persons are eligible for membership in the traditional and renowned the Mayflower society based in Plymouth, Massachusetts.

== Bibliography (selection) ==
- Unter schwarz-rot-goldenem Banner und dem Signum des Doppeladlers. Gescheiterte Volksbewaffnungs- und Vereinigungsbestrebungen in der Deutschen Nationalbewegung und im Deutschen Schützenbund 1859–1869 – Elemente einer Deutschen Tragödie. Peter Lang publishing company for „European College Publications“, 3/549, Frankfurt am Main und Bern, 1963, 659 S.; heading in Library of Congress:.
- Schützengilden. Ursprung - Tradition - Entwicklung.; Keysers Kleine Kulturgeschichte (1985); spezial reproduction; 94 pages
- Das Kind im Blickwinkel neuerer evangelischer und katholischer Theologie. In “Una Sancta”, Journal about the ecumenical Meetings, Kyries-Verlag GmbH, Meitingen, 1966.
- "Kärnter Exilantenschicksal in der Zeit der Gegenreformation – ein Beitrag zur Geschichte der religiös motivierten Vertreibungspolitik Erzherzog Ferdinand II. in Kärnten in den Jahren 1596–1637." Yearbook of the history about the Protestantism in Austria, Jg. 112, Wien, 1996.
- "Das erste deutsche Bundesschießen 1862 in Frankfurt am Main – eine deutsche Tragödie des Unbewältigten," in: Innsbrucker Historische Studien 16/17 (1997), S. 361-406
- Geschichte der Familie von Boehmer in Fortführung der von Hugo Erich von Boehmer im Jahre 1982 verfassten Genealogie der von Justus Henning Boehmer abstammenden Familien sowie einiger der mit ihnen verschwägerten Familien. Rheinische Verlagsanstalt, Bad Godesberg, 1978, 248 S.; heading in Library of Congress.
- Different genealogical publications for the journal „Genealogie“, and also for „Ostdeutsche, Norddeutsche und Mitteldeutsche Familienkunde“ of Degener-Verlag, 91610 Insingen.
- Hans-Thorald Michaelis works in the catalogue from the German National Library
