= Neuruppin =

- Town
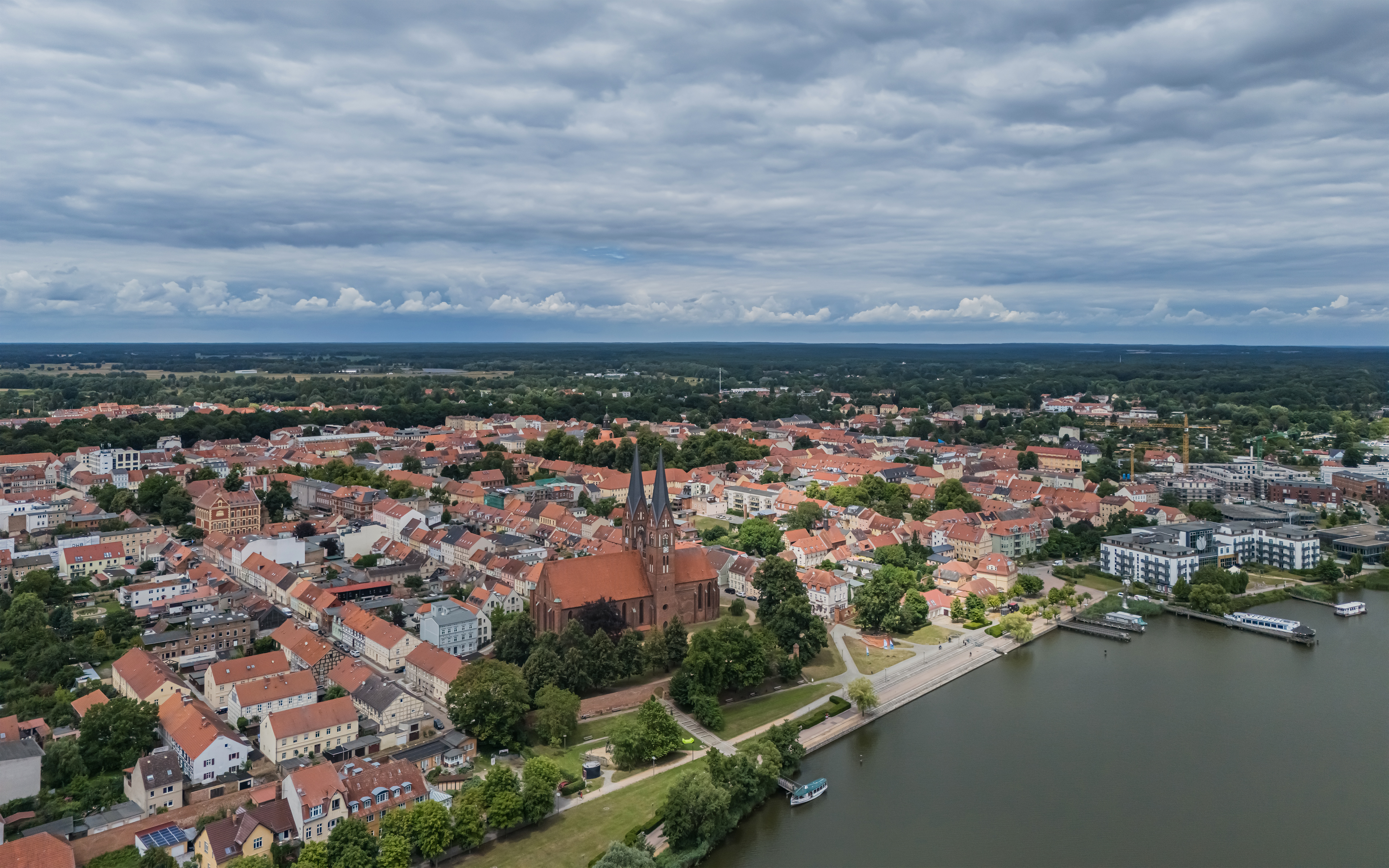
- Aerial view with Holy Trinity Church

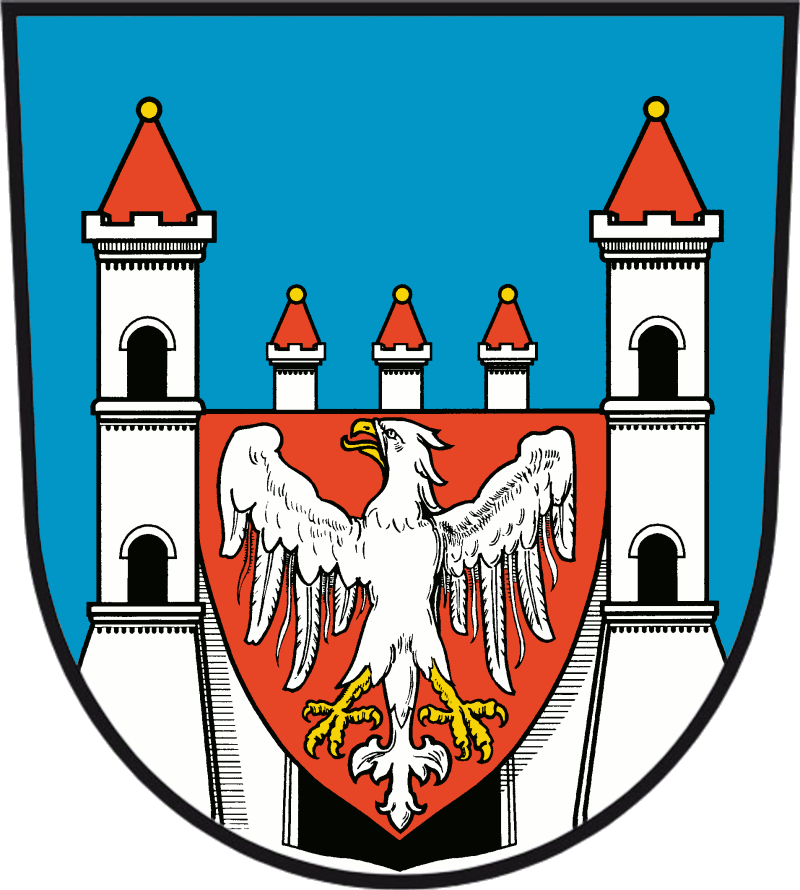
- Coat of arms

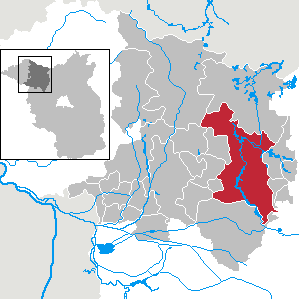
- Location of Neuruppin within Ostprignitz-Ruppin district
- Interactive map of Neuruppin
- Location within Germany Location within Brandenburg
- Coordinates: 52°55′59″N 12°48′00″E
- Country: Germany
- State: Brandenburg
- District: Ostprignitz-Ruppin

Government
  - Mayor (2020–28): Nico Ruhle (SPD)

Area
  - Total: 305.24 km^{2} (117.85 sq mi)
- Elevation: 44 m (144 ft)

Population (2025-12-31)
  - Total: 31,887
  - Density: 104.47/km^{2} (270.56/sq mi)
- Time zone: UTC+01:00 (CET)
  - Summer (DST): UTC+02:00 (CEST)
- Postal codes: 16816, 16818, 16827
- Dialling codes: 03391, 033925, 033929, 033932, 033933
- Vehicle registration: OPR, KY, NP, WK
- Website: www.neuruppin.de

Neuruppin (German: [nɔʏʁʊˈpiːn], lit. 'New Ruppin', in contrast to "Old Ruppin"; North Brandenburgisch: Reppin) is a town in Brandenburg, Germany, the administrative seat of Ostprignitz-Ruppin district. It is the birthplace of the novelist Theodor Fontane (1819–1898) and therefore also referred to as Fontanestadt. A garrison town since 1688 and largely rebuilt in a Neoclassical style after a devastating fire in 1787, Neuruppin has the reputation of being "the most Prussian of all Prussian towns".

== Geography ==
=== Geographical position ===
Neuruppin is one of the largest cities in Germany in terms of area. The city of Neuruppin, 60 km (37 mi) northwest of Berlin in the district of Ostprignitz-Ruppin (Ruppin Switzerland), consists in the south of the districts located on the shores of Ruppiner See, which is crossed by the Rhin River, including the actual core city of Neuruppin and Alt Ruppin. In the north, it stretches up to the Rheinsberg Lake Region and the border with Mecklenburg-Vorpommern. It is part of the Stechlin-Ruppiner Land Nature Park and is connected to the Wittstock-Ruppiner Heide, which was partly used for military purposes as the Wittstock military training area.

=== Municipal subdivisions ===
After several annexations in 1993, Neuruppin today is one of Germany's largest municipalities by area. The following districts and residential areas belong to Neuruppin since the annexations in 1993.

| Districts | Parts of the municipality | Residences |
|---|---|---|
| Alt Ruppin, Buskow, Gnewikow, Gühlen-Glienicke, Karwe, Lichtenberg, Krangen, Molchow, Neuruppin (Kernstadt, not an official district), Nietwerder, Radensleben, Stöffin, Wulkow, Wuthenow | Binenwalde, Boltenmühle, Kunsterspring, Neuglienicke, Pabstthum, Radehorst, Rheinsberg-Glienicke, Seehof, Steinberge, Stendenitz, Zermützel, Zippelsförde | Alte Schäferei, Ausbau Nietwerder, Ausbau Wulkow, Bechlin, Birkenhof, Bürgerwendemark, Bütow, Dietershof, Ferienpark Klausheide, Fristow, Gentzrode, Gildenhall, Heidehaus, Hermannshof, Lietze, Musikersiedlung, Neumühle, Quäste, Rägelsdorf, Roofwinkel, Rottstiel, Stöffiner Berg, Tornow, Treskow |

In addition, there is the deserted Krangensbrück.

=== Climate ===
Climate data for Neuruppin (1991–2020 normals)
| Month | Jan | Feb | Mar | Apr | May | Jun | Jul | Aug | Sep | Oct | Nov | Dec | Year |
|---|---|---|---|---|---|---|---|---|---|---|---|---|---|
| Record high °C (°F) | 14.4 (57.9) | 17.7 (63.9) | 21.1 (70.0) | 28.1 (82.6) | 30.6 (87.1) | 35.3 (95.5) | 35.7 (96.3) | 35.0 (95.0) | 30.5 (86.9) | 26.6 (79.9) | 17.5 (63.5) | 14.3 (57.7) | 35.7 (96.3) |
| Mean daily maximum °C (°F) | 3.0 (37.4) | 4.4 (39.9) | 8.4 (47.1) | 14.4 (57.9) | 19.0 (66.2) | 21.7 (71.1) | 24.1 (75.4) | 23.6 (74.5) | 19.2 (66.6) | 13.4 (56.1) | 7.4 (45.3) | 3.9 (39.0) | 13.6 (56.5) |
| Daily mean °C (°F) | 0.7 (33.3) | 1.4 (34.5) | 4.3 (39.7) | 9.3 (48.7) | 13.9 (57.0) | 16.8 (62.2) | 19.1 (66.4) | 18.4 (65.1) | 14.4 (57.9) | 9.5 (49.1) | 4.9 (40.8) | 1.9 (35.4) | 9.6 (49.3) |
| Mean daily minimum °C (°F) | −1.8 (28.8) | −1.6 (29.1) | 0.6 (33.1) | 4.3 (39.7) | 8.5 (47.3) | 11.4 (52.5) | 14.0 (57.2) | 13.6 (56.5) | 10.2 (50.4) | 6.1 (43.0) | 2.4 (36.3) | −0.4 (31.3) | 5.6 (42.1) |
| Record low °C (°F) | −22.5 (−8.5) | −23.8 (−10.8) | −19.1 (−2.4) | −6.8 (19.8) | −1.7 (28.9) | 2.1 (35.8) | 6.6 (43.9) | 4.8 (40.6) | 1.5 (34.7) | −6.4 (20.5) | −11.6 (11.1) | −16.1 (3.0) | −23.8 (−10.8) |
| Average precipitation mm (inches) | 47.4 (1.87) | 33.8 (1.33) | 37.0 (1.46) | 30.4 (1.20) | 48.3 (1.90) | 62.3 (2.45) | 73.4 (2.89) | 55.7 (2.19) | 44.3 (1.74) | 43.7 (1.72) | 40.7 (1.60) | 45.3 (1.78) | 567.3 (22.33) |
| Average precipitation days (≥ 1.0 mm) | 16.4 | 14.1 | 13.9 | 11.9 | 12.9 | 12.9 | 14.6 | 13.6 | 12.2 | 13.5 | 15.1 | 17.4 | 169.6 |
| Average snowy days (≥ 1.0 cm) | 2.6 | 3.6 | 1.2 | 0 | 0 | 0 | 0 | 0 | 0 | 0 | 0 | 2.3 | 9.7 |
| Average relative humidity (%) | 87.5 | 85.5 | 82.9 | 79.6 | 78.5 | 78.4 | 78.0 | 77.0 | 79.1 | 82.5 | 86.5 | 87.8 | 81.9 |
| Mean monthly sunshine hours | 51.5 | 74.3 | 127.5 | 197.1 | 240.5 | 234.7 | 239.6 | 219.8 | 166.8 | 115.5 | 53.2 | 39.4 | 1,764.3 |
Source 1: World Meteorological Organization
Source 2: Weather and climate in Neuruppin

== History ==
=== Before the city fire (until 1787) ===
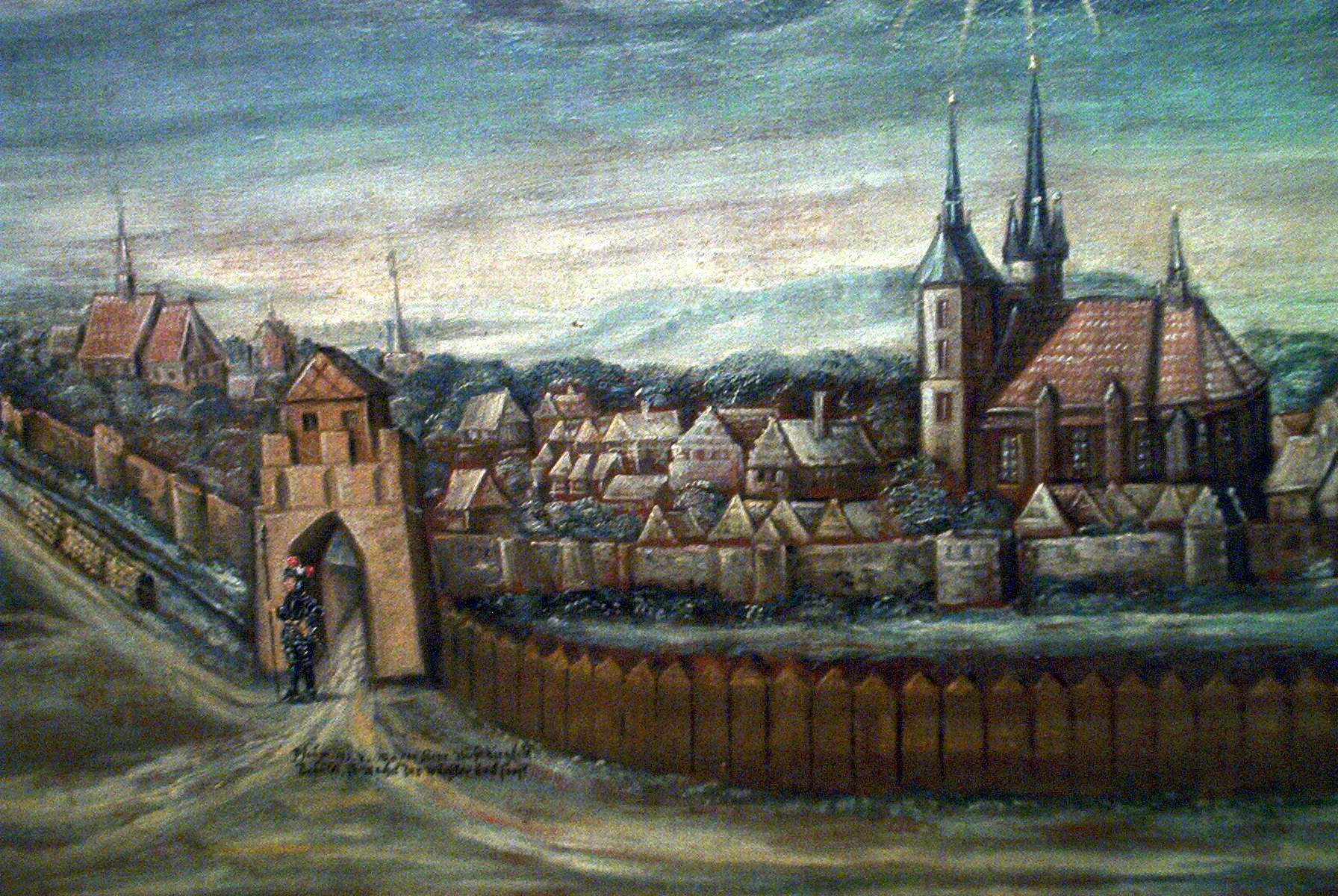
View of Neuruppin, about 1694

The prehistoric settlement of the country ranges from the Middle Stone Age through the younger Bronze Age with first Germanic, later Slavic settlements (in the old town area - including "Neuer Markt" - and in the surrounding countryside) on the shores of Lake Ruppin. In late Slavic times, this area was settled by the Zamzizi tribe, whose center was probably the Slawenburg Ruppin on the island of Poggenwerder near Alt Ruppin. After the Wendish Crusade in 1147 and the conquest of the land by the German nobility, around 1200 on the Amtswerder, a peninsula next to the island of Poggenwerder, the Ruppin Castle (also Planenburg) was built as a large lowland castle and political center of the Lordship of Ruppin. In the northern foreland a market settlement with Nikolai church developed, east of it and beyond the Rhin the Kietz: the town (Olden Ruppyn) Alt Ruppin had arisen.

Southwest of the castle town, the settlement of today's Neuruppin with Nikolaikirche (St. Nicholas' Church) and a street market was established at the beginning of the 13th century, keeping the name Ruppin.

The then (Neu-)Ruppin was a planned town foundation of the counts of Lindow-Ruppin, a collateral line of the Arnsteins, who resided in Alt Ruppin. The first documentary mention dates back to 1238. An expansion of the original Marktsiedlung Alt Ruppin, towards the present-day city of Neuruppin, probably took place before the foundation of the Dominican monastery in 1246 as the first settlement of the order between the Elbe and Oder rivers by the first prior Wichmann von Arnstein. The granting of the Stendal town charter took place on March 9, 1256, by Günther von Arnstein. The city was fortified in the 13th century by palisades and a rampart-ditch system, later it was fortified by walls and rampart-ditches; 24 "Wiekhäuser" and two high towers reinforced the city wall. In addition, there were three gates, the Altruppiner/Rheinsberger Tor in the north, the Berliner/Bechliner Tor in the south and the Seetor in the east. The complete walled enclosure occurred at the latest towards the end of the 15th century.

Neuruppin's oldest part was an elongated Anger, accompanied by two parallel streets between the southern and northern city gates, in the south on it the oldest church of Neuruppin (St. Nikolai). The main street of Neuruppin was pavement since the middle of the 16th century. Across Neuruppin, from the northwest toward the lake, ran the Klappgraben, coming from the Ruppiner Mesche, to supply the city with service water and for drainage, which was partially filled in 1537 and renewed as an open canal in Schinkelstraße after the city fire of 1787.

In the Middle Ages, Neuruppin was one of the larger northeastern German cities. Preserved from this period are, among other things, parts of the city wall, parts of the monastery church of St. Trinitatis (1246), St. George's Chapel (1362), the leprosorium (1490) with the St. Lazarus Chapel consecrated in 1491, as well as remains of the lake district. The medieval city had a nearly square ground plan of about 700 m × 700 m, which blunts conspicuously at the eastern corner. The east-southeast side borders on the Ruppiner Lake.

In 1512, to celebrate a peace treaty, Elector Joachim I organized a three-day jousting tournament in Neuruppin. After the extinction of the Counts of Lindow-Ruppin in 1524, Neuruppin came to the Elector Joachim I as a settled fief. The Thirty Years' War also devastated Neuruppin. In the course of the Reformation, the monastery property fell to the elector around 1540. In 1564, he donated the monastery to the city. During this time, a legend depicted in the monastery church about a mouse chasing a rat, which is interpreted as a sign that the church would remain Lutheran in the future.

A Latin school was first documented in Neuruppin in 1365, which at times had supra-regional importance. Its history is well documented since 1477. In 1777 Philipp Julius Lieberkühn and Johann Stuve took over the school administration and reformed the school in the Basedowsche Sense, which received general attention.

In 1688 Neuruppin became one of the first garrison towns in Brandenburg. It was here that Crown Prince Frederick was imprisoned from 1732 to 1740 after his unsuccessful escape attempt and subsequent imprisonment in Küstrin. Holder of the Regiment on Foot Crown Prince. During this time, Bernhard Feldmann city physicist. His transcripts of historically interesting council records are considered the most important collection of sources on early town history, as the original records were destroyed in the town fire of 1787. At times the number of soldiers and civilian troop members was 1500 out of 3500 inhabitants. Neuruppin only lost this status with the withdrawal of the Group of Soviet Forces in Germany.

After 1685, French Huguenots settled there. From 1740 the organ builder Gottlieb Scholtze had his workshop in Neuruppin, who among other things built the organ in Rheinsberg.

=== City fire and reconstruction (1787-1803) ===
A break in the development of the town was the wildfire of Sunday, August 26, 1787. The fire broke out in a barn filled with grain at the Bechliner Tor in the afternoon and spread rapidly. Only two narrow areas on the eastern and western edges of the city remained. A total of 401 bourgeois houses, 159 outbuildings and outhouses, 228 stables and 38 barns, the parish church of St. Mary, the town hall, the Reformed church, and the Prince's Palace were destroyed. Property damage was estimated at nearly 600,000 talers. The Fire Fund replaced about 220,000 thalers, a special church collection yielded 60,000 thalers, and the Prussian Government provided 130,000 thalers of funding for the reconstruction of the city. In total, the state spent over one million thalers in the following years.

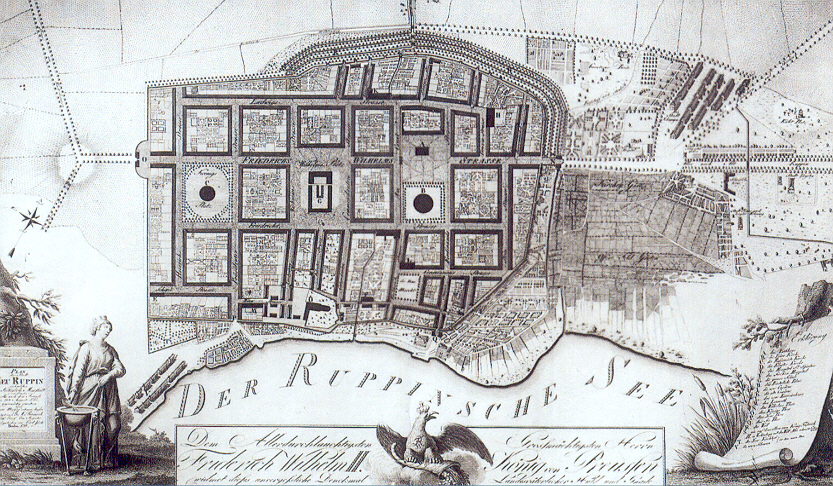
Plan of the city of Neuruppin, 1789

The city planning director Bernhard Matthias Brasch (1741-1821), who had been active in the city since 1783, implemented the specifications of the reconstruction commission and supervised the corresponding works. These took place from 1788 to 1803, following a uniformly planned ground plan. Brasch's plan envisaged the expansion of the city from 46 to almost 61 hectares with the removal of the ramparts between the Tempelgarten and the lake. The two north–south streets, which were close together, were united into one axis, later Karl-Marx-Strasse. A rectangular network of streets with continuous two-story troughshouses was created. Long wide streets interrupted by stately plazas, and houses in a transformation architecture mixing Baroque, Mannerist and Gothic design elements with Neoclassical trends, have shaped the townscape since that time. These urban reform principles are well recognizable. Thus, with the reconstruction, a classicist city layout unique in this originality was created. The reconstruction was already completed in 1803. Only the completion of the parish church of St. Mary (built 1801-1806 by Philipp Bernard François Berson with the collaboration of Carl Ludwig Engel) dragged on until 1806 due to structural problems.

After the disastrous fire in 1787, the neo-classicism of the rebuilt town's buildings have characterised its townscape to the present day. It remained a garrison town until the late 20th century, since Soviet troops were stationed here until 1993; during this time, there were as many Soviet soldiers as inhabitants in Neuruppin.

=== Reconstruction in the 19th century (1804-1900) ===
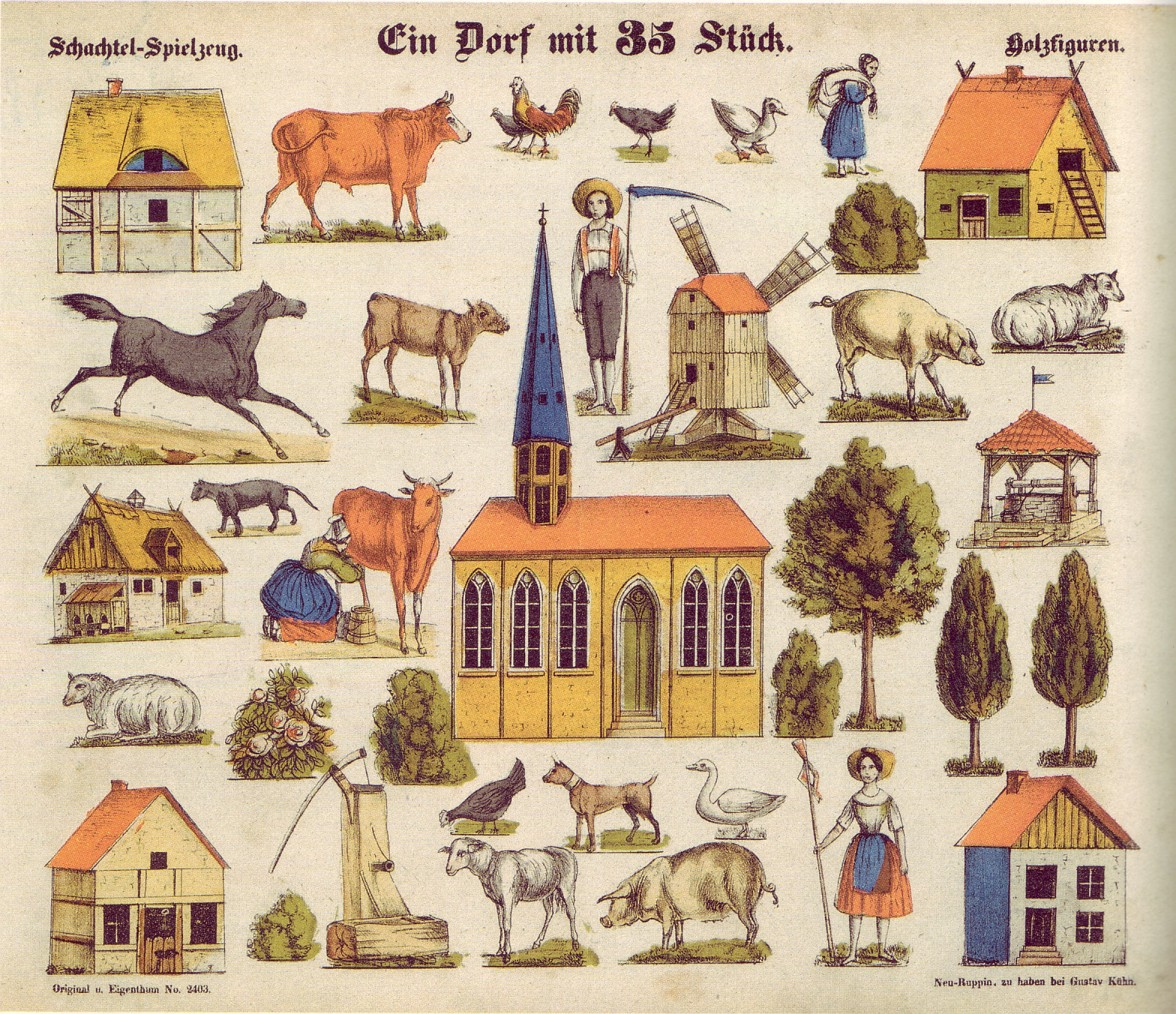
Hand colored Neuruppin picture sheet, around 1850

Johann Bernhard Kühn (1750-1826) began producing picture sheets in Neuruppin, thematically designed and for a long time as hand-colored broadsides. His son Gustav Kühn (1794-1868) achieved print runs of sometimes over three million copies per year (e.g., the Franco-Prussian War of 1870/71). The prints became known worldwide with the inscription Neu-Ruppin, zu haben bei Gustav Kühn. Three other companies produced the popular picture sheets: Philipp Oehmigke, Hermann Riemschneider, and Friedrich Wilhelm Bergemann. All three picture sheet producers managed to hold their own in the German picture sheet manufacturer competition (more than 60 companies throughout Germany) and to occupy the leading positions for a long time.

From 1815 to 1945, Neuruppin was part of the Prussian Province of Brandenburg. In September 1820, the Infantry Regiment 24 came to Neuruppin with its staff and two battalions, while the Fusilier Battalion took up garrison in Prenzlau. The regiment had been raised elsewhere in 1813, and had participated in the wars of liberation and the occupation of France. Initially, the regiment was housed in Neuruppin burghers' quarters.

In 1877, the organ builder Albert Hollenbach set up his workshop in Neuruppin. His works include organs in the churches of the districts of Bechlin, Buskow, Karwe, Nietwerder and Storbeck as well as the Siechenhauskapelle in the old town of Neuruppin. After 1880, Neuruppin became the center of a branch line network, which was operated by the Ruppiner Eisenbahn AG until 1945. This radiated to Fehrbellin-Paulinenaue (1880), Kremmen-Berlin and Wittstock-Meyenburg (1899), and Neustadt and Herzberg respectively (1905). For this purpose, a railroad embankment was built across the Ruppiner See, cutting across the lake 2.5 kilometers from the north shore in an east–west direction.

In 1893, the Neuruppin State Lunatic Asylum was built on the southern edge of the central city.

=== The city in the 20th century ===
Fire extinguishers have been manufactured in Neuruppin since 1905. Minimax fire extinguishers in particular quickly became widespread due to their ease of use. During World War I, an aviation squadron was stationed in Neuruppin and an airfield was established. In 1921, an open-air settlement was founded in the Gildenhall district by master builder and settlement engineer Georg Heyer (1880-1944), whose goal was to gather artists and artisans to live and work together in order to create and produce everyday products affordable to all and in artisanal form. It attracted many renowned artists and artisans, and existed until 1929.

In 1926, the road next to the railroad embankment across Lake Ruppin was completed. The settlements Gildenhall and Kolonie Wuthenow thus received a direct connection to Neuruppin. In 1929, these settlements were incorporated, after the Treskow estate district had already been incorporated in 1928.[9]

After the Nazis seized power in June 1933, more than 80 political opponents of the regime, mainly Social Democrats, Jews, and Communists, were taken to a provisional prison run by the SA within the buildings of a brewery on Altruppiner Allee, which had been shut down at that time. SA members tortured and mistreated many of the prisoners here. They are commemorated by a memorial stone created during the Soviet occupation in 1947 and by the ensemble of figures created in 1981 at the behest of the SED district leadership, which replaced the original memorial on Schulplatz.

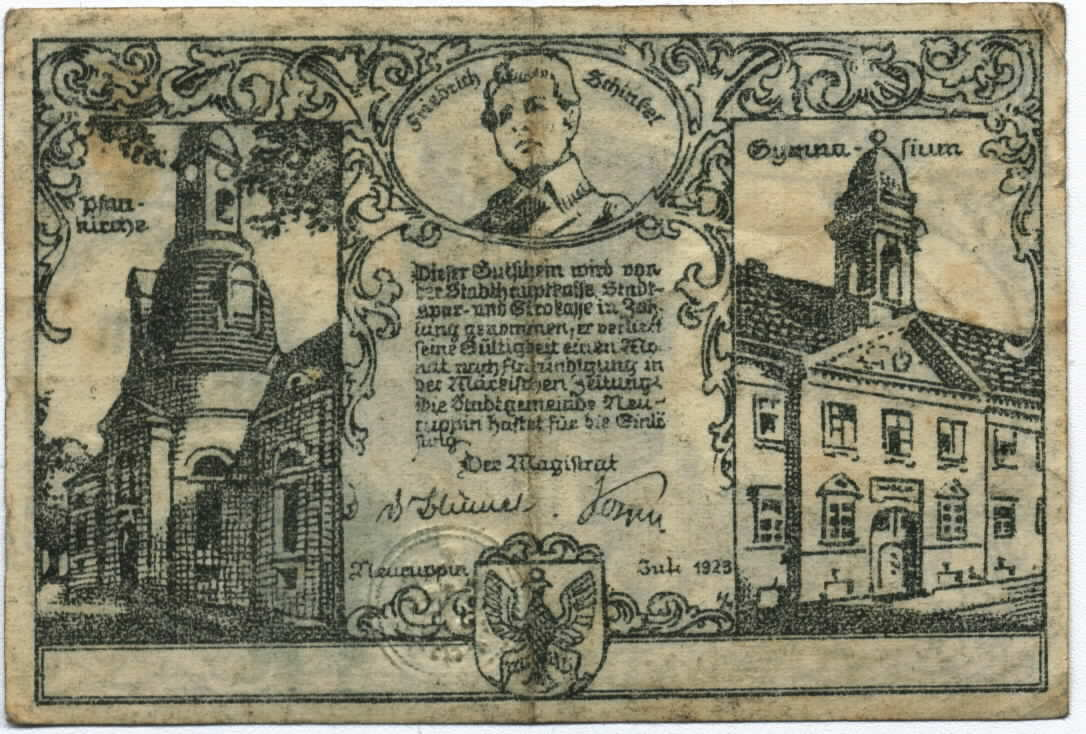
Neuruppin emergency money from 1923 with city motifs

In 1934, the Neuruppin military airfield was revived as the Fliegerschule Neuruppin.

The city's approximately 90 Jewish citizens were persecuted, deported, and murdered during the Nazi era. Their Old Cemetery, established in 1824, was treated relatively leniently; preserved Jewish gravestones were moved to the New Cemetery (Protestant Cemetery) by order of the then regimental commander of the Wehrmacht, Paul von Hase. Since November 17, 2003, Stolpersteine ("stumbling stones") markers in the core city and in Alt-Ruppin have commemorated the murdered Jewish residents.

For the Aktion T4 mass murder campaign of those deemed physically infirm during the National Socialist era, the Neuruppin State Lunatic Asylum served as an intermediate facility for the Brandenburg Euthanasia Centre and the Bernburg Euthanasia Centre. Therefore, the number of patients increased from 1,971 on January 1, 1937, to 4,197 on April 1, 1940. In 1941, only 1,147 of the 1,797 planned beds were still occupied. In 1943, the greater part of the patients were transferred to other institutions in Aktion Brandt. The hospital was also partly used as a reserve hospital during World War II. After 1945, parts of the facility served as a district hospital. On September 20, 2004, six Stolpersteine were laid on the grounds of the Ruppiner Kliniken in memory of the euthanasia victims of the former state lunatic asylum.

On May 1, 1945, Soviet forces reached Neuruppin and prepared to shell the city from the opposite shore of the lake. However, an unknown person managed to raise a white flag on the tower of the monastery church, and the same happened at the parish church. This prevented any destruction. A Soviet cemetery of honor was established north of the Rheinsberger Tor train station, where more than 220 Soviet soldiers were buried.

Neuruppin became one of the largest garrisons of the Group of Soviet Forces in Germany (GSSD). The Soviet forces used the military airfield located immediately north of the central city, whose operation caused considerable noise pollution in the city. In 1989, massive demonstrations by Neuruppin residents in connection with plans for the continued use of the Wittstock military training and air-to-ground firing range led to the closure of the airfield.

Until about 1950, the theater Die neue Bühne was located in the city center. It was operated as part of the state association of the German People's Stage and had up to 95 employees.

In 1951, the Elektro-Physikalische Werkstätten was founded in Neuruppin as a producer of electronic components. From 1970, they were expanded as Elektro-Physikalische Werke (EPW) to become the largest printed circuit board manufacturer in the GDR, employing up to 3,500 workers. Later, the plant was an integral part of the Kombinat Mikroelektronik. In the GDR era, the children's summer camp Frohe Zukunft DDR was located in Gühlen-Glinicke.

In 1952, Neuruppin became the district town of the district of the same name in Bezirk Potsdam as a result of the GDR district reform.

As a result of the fall of the Berlin Wall and the peaceful revolution in the GDR, the state of Brandenburg was reestablished in 1990, while the district of Neuruppin remained in existence for the time being.

==== Neuruppin as a socialist district town 1970-1989 ====
Plans for the development of a modern district town with up to 100,000 inhabitants were made from the mid-1960s to the mid-1970s. The basis for this was the planned industrial and administrative development of the district town of Neuruppin. Beginning in the 1970s, VEB Elektrophysikalische Werke Neuruppin was established to handle all printed circuit board production for the GDR's microelectronics and entertainment technology industries. The VEB Feuerlöschgerätewerke Neuruppin, as the main producer of hand-held fire extinguishers for the Eastern Bloc countries united in the CMEA, and the Volkseigene Backwarenkombinat, as the main producer of all kinds of baked goods for the district town and the district of Neuruppin, were expanded considerably.

All this required the influx of highly qualified management, research, and development personnel as well as many thousands of workers. The resident core population of Neuruppin until the end of the 1960s was not sufficient for this. Planning also took into account Neuruppin's convenient location at the intersection of four important branch lines of the Deutsche Reichsbahn with favorable north–south connections for freight and passenger traffic and the Berlin-Rostock/Hamburg highway (now the A24 and A19), which was in planning and later under construction. The plans for a socialist district town included the construction of several residential complexes outside the town's settlement area, which existed until 1968, and the transformation of the old town, which was located outside the medieval city walls. Due to the dwindling economic power of the socialist planned economy of the GDR, only the following urban development projects were implemented from the 1970s onwards:

- Construction of the "VEB Elektrophysikalische Werke Neuruppin".
- Construction of the "Volkseigene Kombinat Backwaren Neuruppin" (People's Own Bakery Combine Neuruppin)
- Expansion of the "VEB Feuerlöschgerätewerk Neuruppin" (VEB fire extinguisher plant)
- 1961: Construction of the polyclinic (Neustädter Straße) for medical care
- 1970-1974: Construction of the housing complex (WK) I Junckerstraße / Thomas-Mann-Straße / Franz-Maecker-Straße (GDR housing construction series IW 64 type Brandenburg / Markkleeberg)
- 1970-1972: Construction of the road axes E-Strasse (initially without a name E-Strasse = relief road around the city center, since 1973 Heinrich-Rau-Strasse) and the feeder roads north and south to the highway (today A 24),
- 1972: Establishment of a public transport system that still operates according to a regular timetable through the Neuruppin city bus line.
- 1972-1974: Construction of the housing complex (WK) II Hermann-Matern-Straße / Erich-Schulz-Straße / August-Fischer-Straße / Anna-Hausen-Straße (GDR housing series IW 64 type Brandenburg / Markkleeberg)
- 1970-1974: construction and opening of children's combinations (crèche and kindergarten) in housing complexes I and II, construction and opening of Polytechnic Secondary School Theodor Fontane / Karl-Liebknecht and Extended Secondary School Karl-Friedrich Schinkel, opening of department stores in housing complexes I and II
- 1978-1980: Expansion of residential complex I through gap construction (GDR housing construction series WBS 70) between WK I (Junckerstraße) and WK II (Hermann-Matern-Straße), as of 1982, the addition of delicatessen, fruit and vegetable store and residential area restaurant in combination with FDJ youth club 019 (today club disco and night bar "Club 019"), construction of the community center in residential complex II as a residential area restaurant, event hall and student dining hall of the POS Theodor Fontane / Karl Liebknecht
- 1980-1991: Construction of the residential complex III (GDR housing construction series WBS 70) Heinrich-Rau-Straße / Bruno-Salvat-Straße / Otto-Grotewohl-Straße / Otto-Winzer-Straße / Rudolf-Wendt-Straße, partly with apartments for senior citizens.

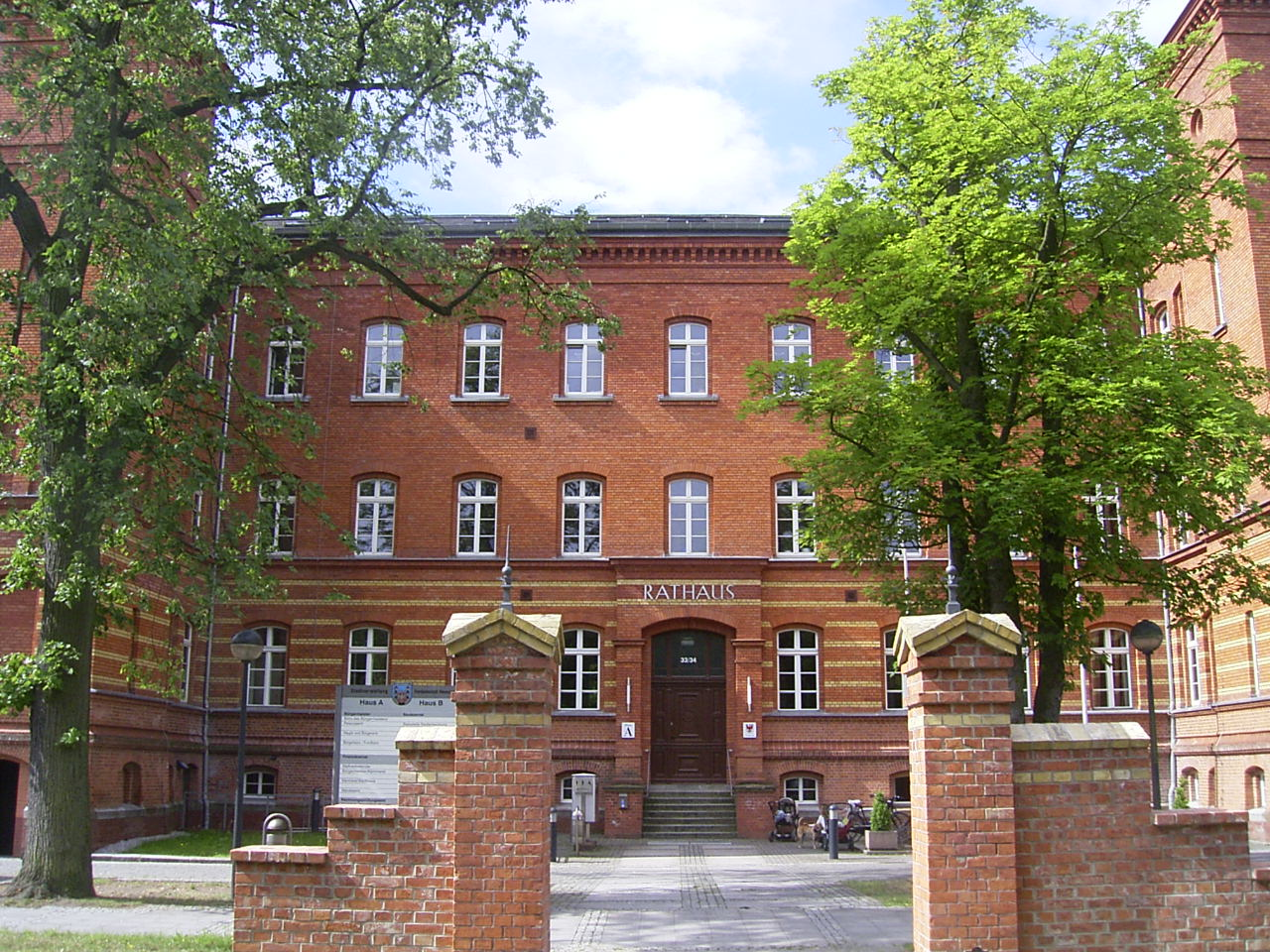
Neuruppin city hall

The historic old town of Neuruppin was spared further redesigns during GDR times for reasons of cost. The construction of a four-lane expressway following the model of an automotive city - leading from Fehrbelliner Strasse along the present Regattastrasse via Bollwerk, crossing Seedamm / Steinstrasse, in the direction of Wittstocker Allee - was opposed by financial constraints in the GDR. The relocation of the VEB Feuerlöschgerätewerk Neuruppin and the compensation for the areas and buildings between Bollwerk and the VEB Feuerlöschgerätewerk which had been taken up by the Soviet Army, did not help the economic power of the GDR in the mid-1970s.

==== The 1970s ====
Neuruppin grew from a small town with about 18,000 inhabitants to 33,000 inhabitants between 1970 and 1989 through the settlement and expansion of technology and industry, which was economically significant for the GDR and the RGW states and as exports to the NSW (non-socialist economic area) in exchange for foreign currency, due to an influx of differently educated people from all parts of the GDR. Added to this were the many foreign workers and apprentices from the allied socialist states of Vietnam, Angola, Cuba, and the Soviet armed forces stationed there with around 12,000 men (including their families). Thus, a diverse population developed in the new housing complex developments I to III.

==== The Old Town of Neuruppin 1980-1990 ====
For reasons of cost, the old town of Neuruppin was spared the planned modern redesigns, but it deteriorated noticeably by the end of the 1970s. Beginning in the 1980s, the SED of the GDR began to reflect on the cities' historical past. Thus, from 1980 to 1986, the old town of Neuruppin was redeveloped according to the classicist model with the cooperation of then-mayor Harald Lemke.

==== Future Residential Complex I to III ====
Contrary to the trend after the fall of the Berlin Wall in 1989 in the state of Brandenburg, no residential buildings were demolished in residential complexes I to III. All apartments in residential complexes I to III Neuruppin are 100% in municipal or cooperative management (statistics as of 2015) and 99% are rented.

==== Neuruppin after the incorporation in 1993 ====
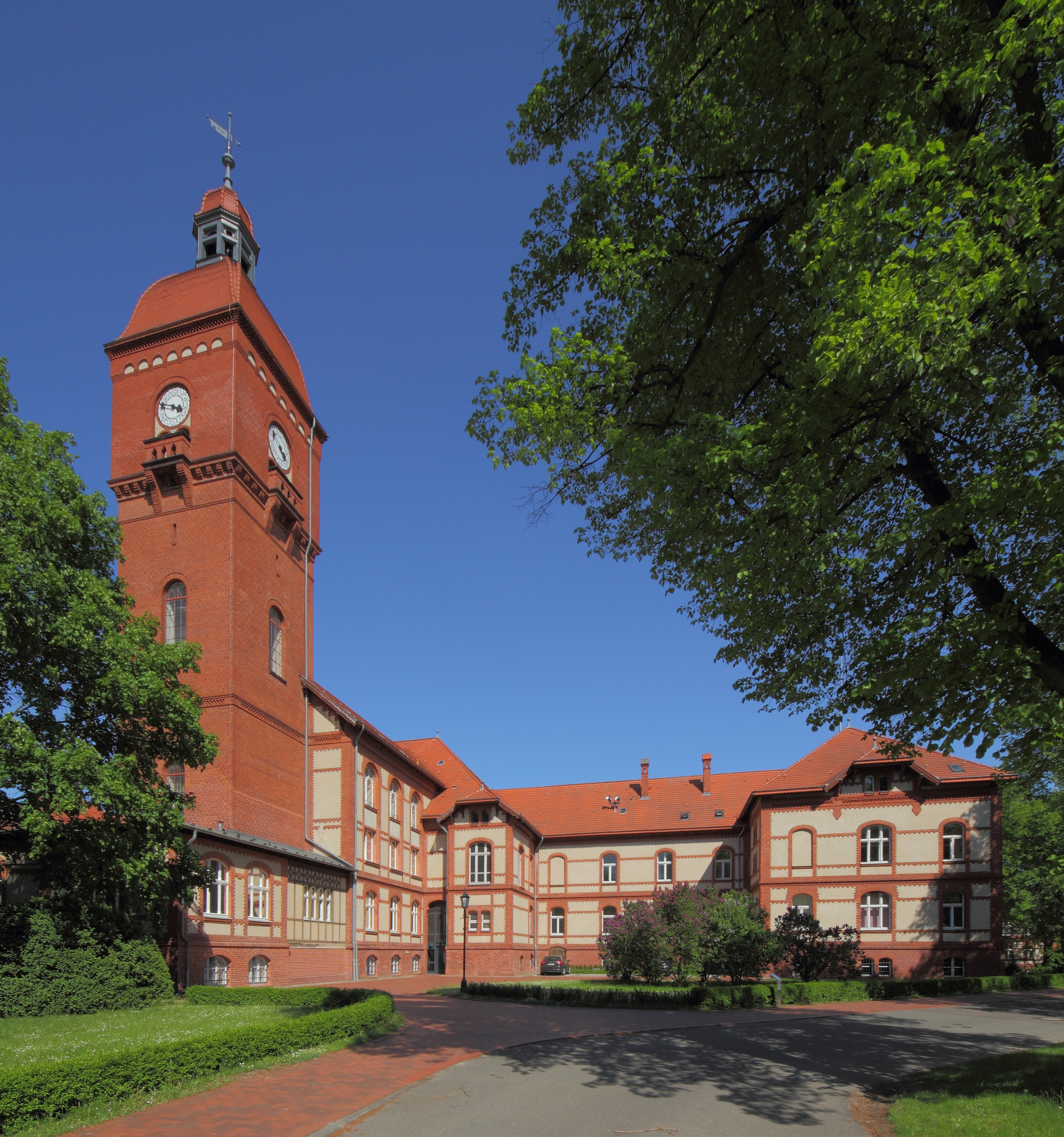
House I of the Ruppiner Kliniken

When the new districts were formed, which came into effect on December 6, 1993, the district of Neuruppin was absorbed into the district of Ostprignitz-Ruppin. On the same day, Neuruppin was significantly enlarged by incorporating the town of Alt Ruppin as well as the communities of Buskow, Gnewikow, Gühlen-Glienicke, Karwe, Krangen, Lichtenberg, Molchow, Nietwerder, Radensleben, Stöffin, Wulkow and Wuthenow. Until 1991, Neuruppin was still the location of the 12th Soviet Armored Division. The barracks were later converted into residential buildings as part of the Expo 2000 outdoor project. Parts of the airfield are now still used for gliding.

In 1996, the then Neuruppin Regional Clinic and the District Hospital passed into the ownership of the Ostprignitz-Ruppin district as parts of the Ruppiner Kliniken GmbH. The Ruppiner Kliniken are thus one of the largest regional employers. The Protestant church districts of Ruppin and Wittstock/Dosse merged in 1998, and Neuruppin lost the seat of the superintendent to Wittstock as a result.

On March 11, 1998, the city was awarded the additional designation of Fontanestadt. On January 1, 2001, the focal public prosecutor's office for corruption was established in Neuruppin as the successor to the department for GDR injustices and district crime. It is responsible for corruption offenses throughout the state of Brandenburg.

On September 7, 2002, the 7th Brandenburg Day was held in Neuruppin with approximately 230,000 visitors. In response to the Elbe flood in July 2002 in Saxony, numerous artists such as Udo Lindenberg and Gerhard Schöne donated their fees in support of the flood victims. In May 2009, it became public knowledge for the first time that the groundwater under a new development area at Ruppiner See was contaminated with halogenated hydrocarbons. The district of Ostprignitz-Ruppin, as the responsible environmental authority, admitted to having known about the environmental contamination since 1999 through measurements taken during earlier construction projects.

On May 12, 2011, the iodine-containing thermal brine pool in Neuruppin received the first state recognition of a medicinal spring in the state of Brandenburg. The thermal brine pool is used by the Fontane-Therme on the edge of the old town for wellness operations and heating purposes.

== Demography ==
Development of population since 1875 within the current boundaries (blue line: population; dotted line: comparison to population development in Brandenburg state; grey background: time of Nazi Germany; red background: time of communist East Germany)

Recent population development and projections (population development before 2011 census (blue line); recent population development according to the Census in Germany in 2011 (blue bordered line); official projections for 2005–2030 (yellow line); for 2017–2030 (scarlet line); for 2020–2030 (green line)

Neuruppin: Population development
within the current boundaries (2020)

| Year | Pop. | ±% p.a. |
|---|---|---|
| 1875 | 20,080 | — |
| 1890 | 21,912 | +0.58% |
| 1910 | 26,164 | +0.89% |
| 1925 | 26,640 | +0.12% |
| 1939 | 33,090 | +1.56% |
| 1950 | 36,677 | +0.94% |
| 1964 | 31,422 | −1.10% |
| 1971 | 31,283 | −0.06% |

| Year | Pop. | ±% p.a. |
|---|---|---|
| 1981 | 33,042 | +0.55% |
| 1985 | 33,989 | +0.71% |
| 1990 | 34,014 | +0.01% |
| 1995 | 32,795 | −0.73% |
| 2000 | 32,598 | −0.12% |
| 2005 | 32,145 | −0.28% |
| 2010 | 31,599 | −0.34% |
| 2015 | 30,715 | −0.57% |

| Year | Pop. | ±% p.a. |
|---|---|---|
| 2016 | 31,037 | +1.05% |
| 2017 | 30,889 | −0.48% |
| 2018 | 30,846 | −0.14% |
| 2019 | 30,785 | −0.20% |
| 2020 | 30,764 | −0.07% |
| 2021 | 31,002 | +0.77% |

Territorial status of the respective year, number of inhabitants: as of December 31 (from 1991), from 2011 on the basis of the 2011 census.

== Politics ==
=== City Council ===
The city council of Neuruppin comprises 30 city councilors and the full-time mayor. The municipal election on May 26, 2019, with a voter turnout of 49.0%, resulted in the following:

| Party / Voter group | Share of votes | Seats |
|---|---|---|
| CDU | 18,6 % | 6 |
| SPD | 18,1 % | 6 |
| Die Linke | 15,9 % | 5 |
| Bündnis 90/Die Grünen | 13,1 % | 4 |
| Pro Ruppin | 12,8 % | 4 |
| AfD | 10,9 % | 2 |
| Freie Wähler | 4,5 % | 1 |
| Wählergruppe Kreisbauernverband | 3,8 % | 1 |
| FDP | 2,3 % | 1 |

The AfD accounted for four seats in line with its share of the vote, two of which remain unoccupied because the party nominated only two candidates. The CDU and FDP have joined forces to form a parliamentary group, as have Bündnis 90/Die Grünen and the voters' group Kreisbauernverband.

=== Mayors ===
==== Before the city reform ====
- around 1786: Goering

==== After the city reform in 1808 ====
| 1810–1816: Dr. Braun; 1816–1822: Balthasar Friedrich Knoevenvogel; 1822–1851: Ernst Adolph Bienengräber; 1851–1888: Ch. L. G. von Schulz; 1889–1899: Adolf Trenckmann; 1899–1923: Max Warzecha; 1923–1933: Ernst Blümel; 1934–1945: Kurt Krüger; 1945: Reinhold Meyer; 1945: Karl Hochstädt; 1945: Hermann Huch; 1945–1946: Richard Schulz | 1946–1948: Trude Marx; 1948–1949: H. Schulz; 1949–1951: Joseph Robiné; 1951–1953: Otto Herms; 1954–?: Max Hartmann; 1957–1965: Bruno Salvat; 1965–1970: Günter Weigt; 1970–1978: Gerd Hohlfeld; 1978–1988: Harald Lemke; 1988–1990: Rainer Frank; 1990–1991: Silke Bringmann; 1991–1994: Joachim Zindler |

==== After the annexations in 1993 ====
- 1994–2004: Otto Theel
- 2005-2020: Jens-Peter Golde
- since 2020: Nico Ruhle

Ruhle was elected to an eight-year term in the November 29, 2020 mayoral runoff election with 56.7% of the valid votes.

=== Dealing with corruption ===
In 2004, Neuruppin made headlines for corruption and nepotism. In view of the growing scandals in local politics, the city acquired derogatory nicknames such as "Märkisches Palermo" or "Klein Palermo" and "Korruppin" as it struggled with battling corruption.

The former CDU city councilor Olaf Kamrath was legally sentenced in 2006 as the head of the XY gang to many years in prison for, among other things, gang-related narcotics offences. In 2007, the verdict against former city councilor Reinhard Sommerfeld (Neuruppiner Initiative) was the only legally binding conviction of an elected official in Germany for bribery of members of parliament to date. The former state parliament member Otto Sommerfeld was convicted of bribery of members of parliament.

On May 15, 2008, former state parliament member Otto Theel (Die Linke) was given a nine-month suspended prison sentence for taking advantage in office during his term as mayor of Neuruppin. He subsequently resigned his seat in the state parliament. In September 2008, Sparkasse Ostprignitz-Ruppin parted ways with its previous CEO Josef Marckhoff, who had his employer throw him a circa 55,000 euro celebration to mark his own 60th birthday. The date coincided with the company's 160th anniversary.

The former managing director of the municipal public utility company Neuruppin Dietmar Lenz was sentenced to a suspended prison sentence of two years on March 19, 2009, on charges of a serious breach of trust and acceptance of benefits, having spent more than 500,000 euros bypassing the supervisory board to support the sports club MSV Neuruppin. At the end of 2009 he committed suicide. A citizens' initiative initiated with the help of the two relevantly previously convicted Otto Theel and Reinhard Sommerfeld a deselection petition against Mayor Jens-Peter Golde. Golde was accused by the citizens' petition "Kein weiter so!" of lacking leadership quality, failing to fulfill his election program and endangering jobs in Neuruppin. It failed by its own account in February 2010 with 5079 of the required 5300 signatures.

As of January 1, 2016, Neuruppin became the sixth corporate municipal member of Transparency International, along with Bonn, Hamm (Westphalia), Potsdam, Leipzig, and Halle (Saale).

=== Neuruppin remains colorful ===
In the run-up to a planned demonstration of radical right-wing groups in the core city of Neuruppin on September 1, 2007, the non-partisan action alliance Neuruppin bleibt bunt formed and organized a counter-event with about 1000 participants. On September 5, 2009, in view of another planned demonstration of radical right-wing groups, the action alliance organized a series of actions for civil courage along the demonstration route. On March 27, 2010, Neuruppin bleibt bunt organized the democracy festival Demokratie im Quadrat with 2,000 participants in the face of a demonstration march by the radical right-wing Freie Kräfte Neuruppin with 350 participants.

On June 6, 2011, the action alliance received the Band für Mut und Verständigung award for its work. In November 2011, a party convention of the NPD took place in Neuruppin under protest of Neuruppin bleibt bunt against the will of the city. The action alliance was able, through broad civil society engagement, with cultural stage program on the school square and a blockade for the first time to stop the so-called "Day of the German Future". The far-right Freie Kräfte Neuruppin/Osthavelland had organized the demonstration for June 6, 2015.

=== Coat of arms ===
In § 2 para 1 and 2 of the main statutes of the city of Neuruppin states:

The city has been granted the right to bear a coat of arms by a document of the Prussian State Ministry dated June 22, 1928.

The coat of arms was confirmed on March 31, 2003.

Blazon: "In blue a silver castle with two pinned, two-storey towers with two superimposed black gates and gold-knobbed, red pointed roofs; the central building with three turrets and a black gate, which is covered by a red triangular shield, topped with a gold-armed and gold-tongued silver eagle." The eagle is the heraldic animal of the Arnstein noble family.

=== Twin towns – sister cities ===
Neuruppin is twinned with:

- Babimost, Poland
- Bad Kreuznach, Germany
- Certaldo, Italy
- Niiza, Japan
- Nymburk, Czech Republic

== Notable people ==
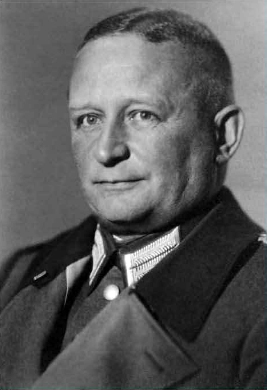
Ferdinand von Bredow 1930

- Joachim Ludwig Schultheiss von Unfriedt (1678–1753), architect
- Karl Friedrich von dem Knesebeck (1768–1848), Prussian field marshal
- Karl Friedrich Schinkel (1781–1841), architect
- Ferdinand Möhring (1816–1887), composer
- Theodor Fontane (1819–1898), novelist and poet
- Otto Friedrich Ferdinand von Görschen (1824–1875), lieutenant colonel
- Paul Carl Beiersdorf (1836–1896), pharmacist and founder of Beiersdorf AG
- Johannes Kaempf (1842–1918), politician, president of Reichstag
- Carl Großmann (1863–1922), serial killer
- Ferdinand von Bredow (1884–1934), Major General of Reichswehr
- Hermann Hoth (1885–1971), army commander and war criminal
- Klaus Schwarzkopf (1922–1991), actor
- Horst Giese (1926–2008), actor
- Eva Strittmatter (1930–2011), writer
- Jörg Hube (1943–2009), actor
- Uwe Hohn (born 1962), javelin thrower
- Ulrich Papke (born 1962), canoeist
- Bernd Gummelt (born 1963), race walker
- Jens-Peter Herold (born 1965), middle-distance runner
- Ralf Büchner (born 1967), gymnast
- Timo Gottschalk (born 1974), rally navigator
- Hans Bettembourg, Weightlifter

=== Associated with the town ===
- Frederick the Great (1712–1786), lived in Neuruppin in his years as crown prince of Prussia
- Carl Phillip Gottlieb von Clausewitz (1780–1831), Prussian general and military strategist, resided in Neuruppin for a few years

== Gallery ==
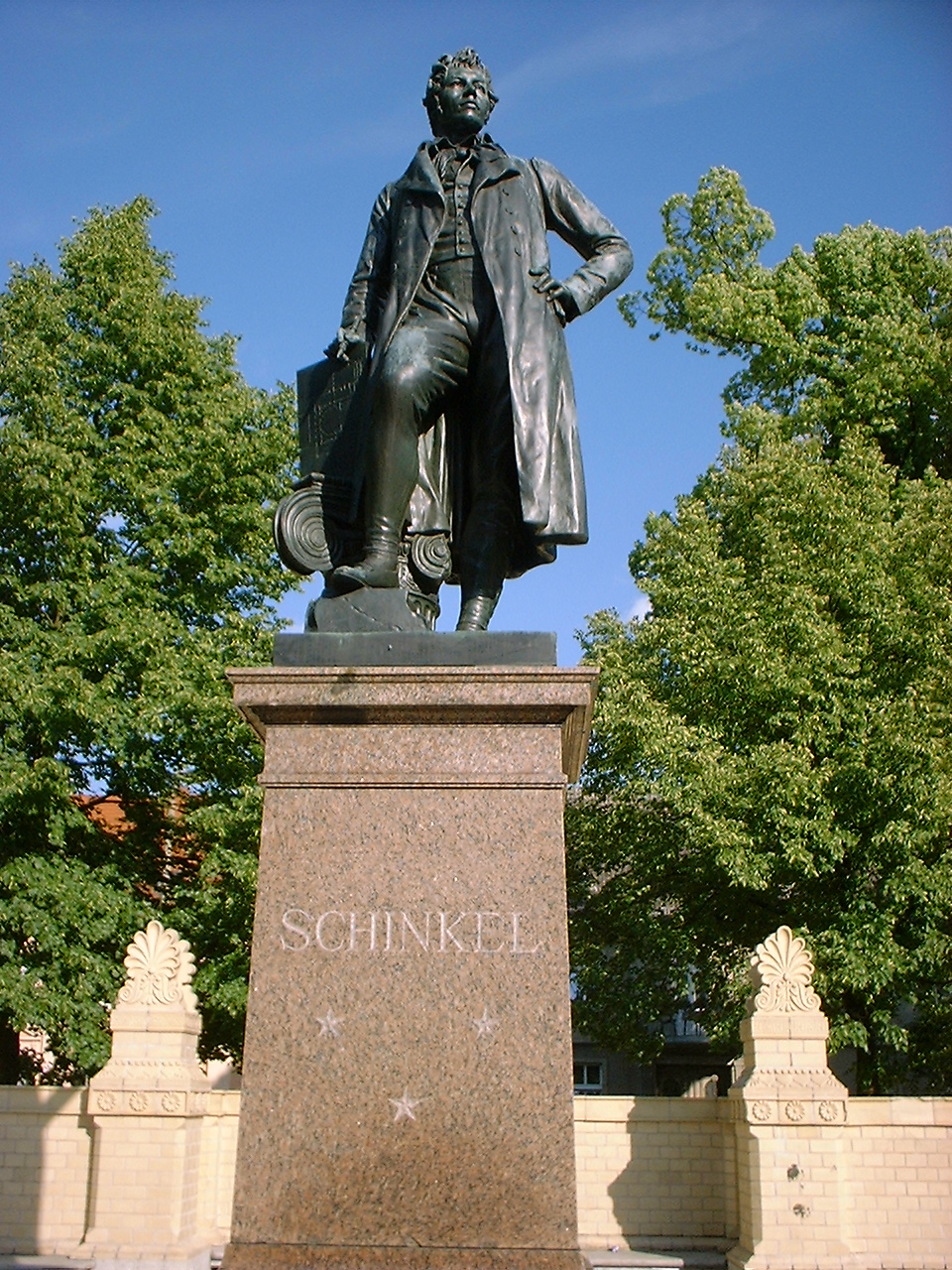
Schinkel statue

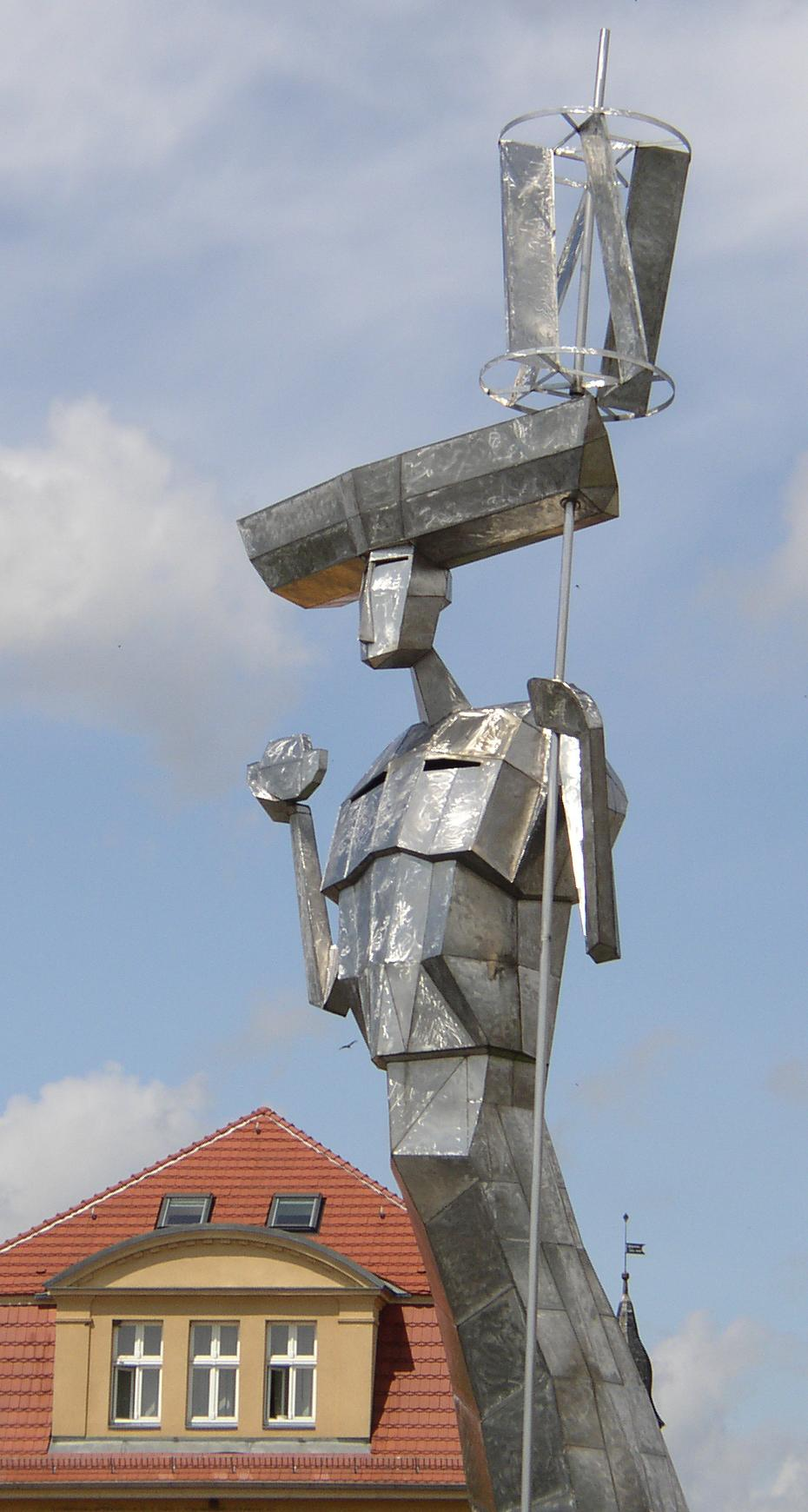
Statue by Matthias Zágon Hohl-Stein

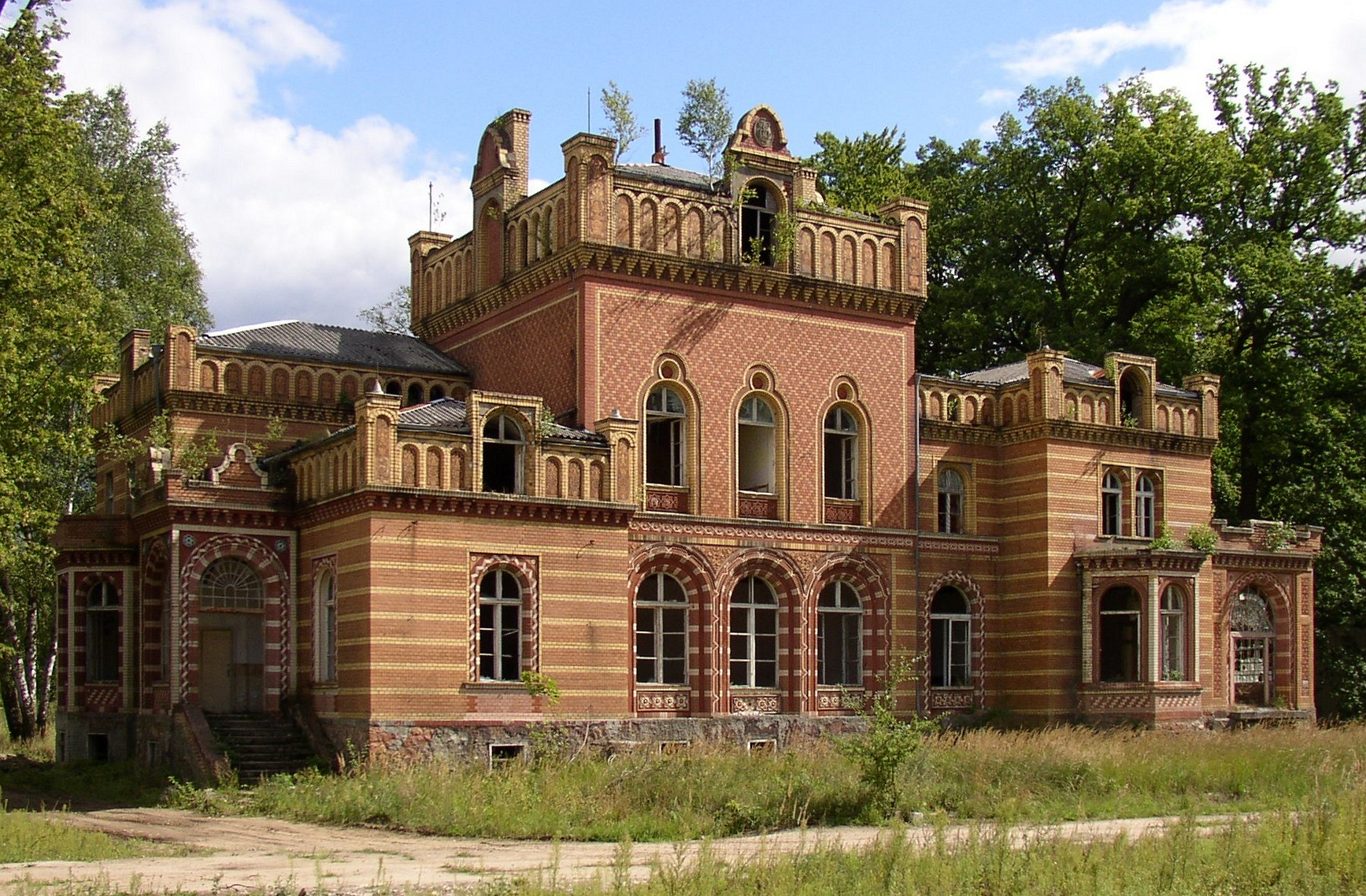
Manor house of the family Gentz in Gentzrode

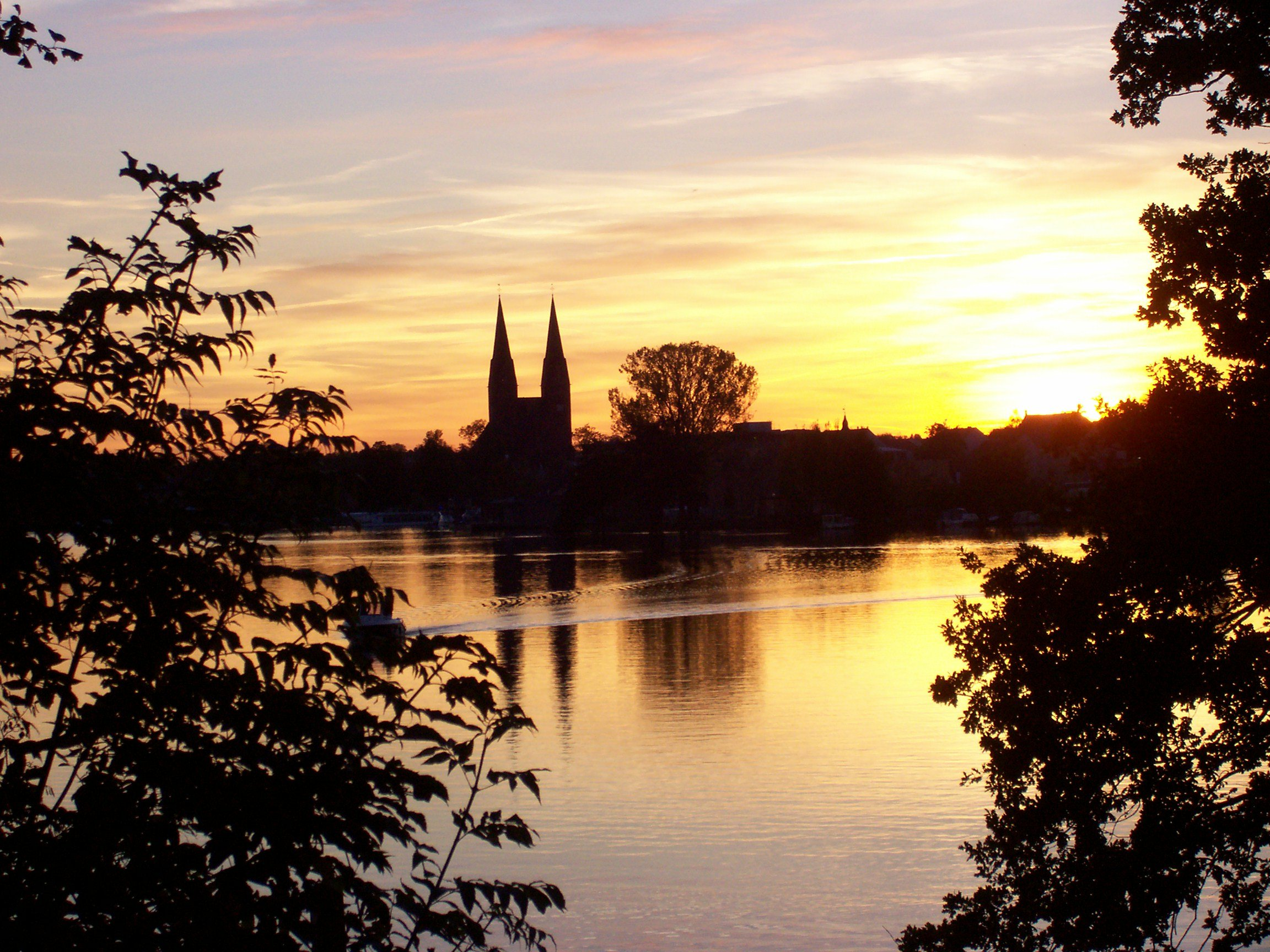
Ruppiner Lake with monastery church towers

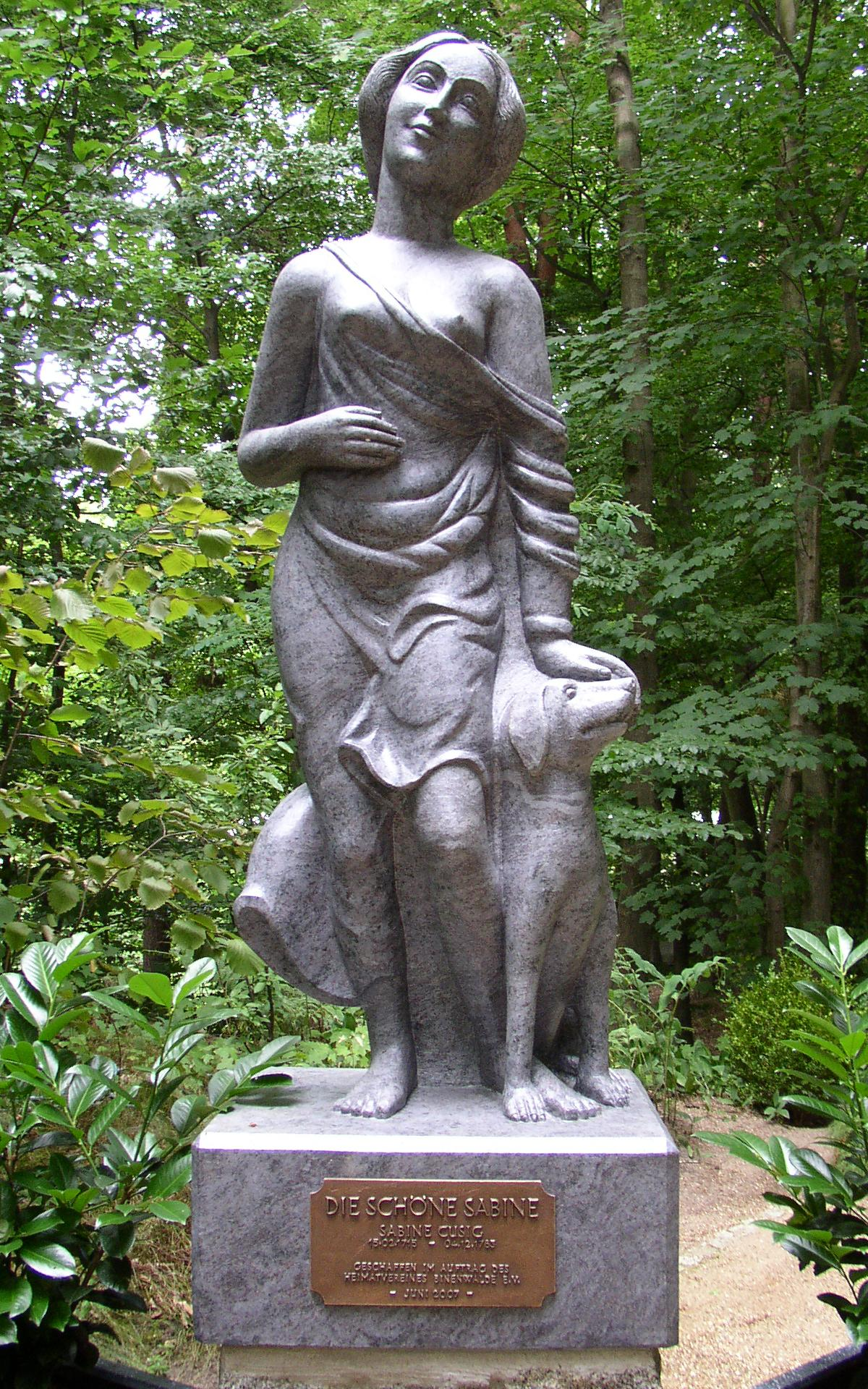
″Sabine" in Binenwalde

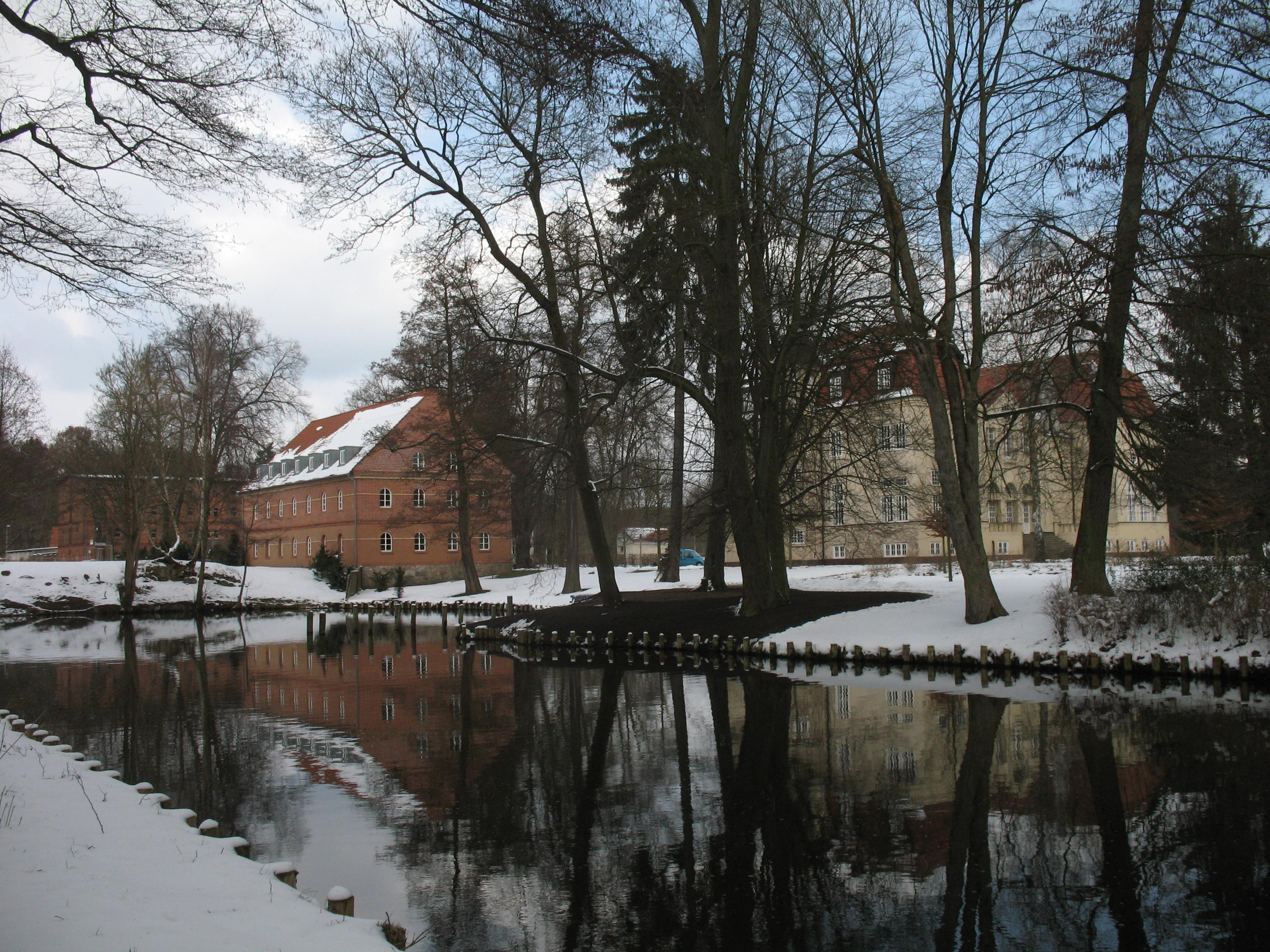
Neumühle

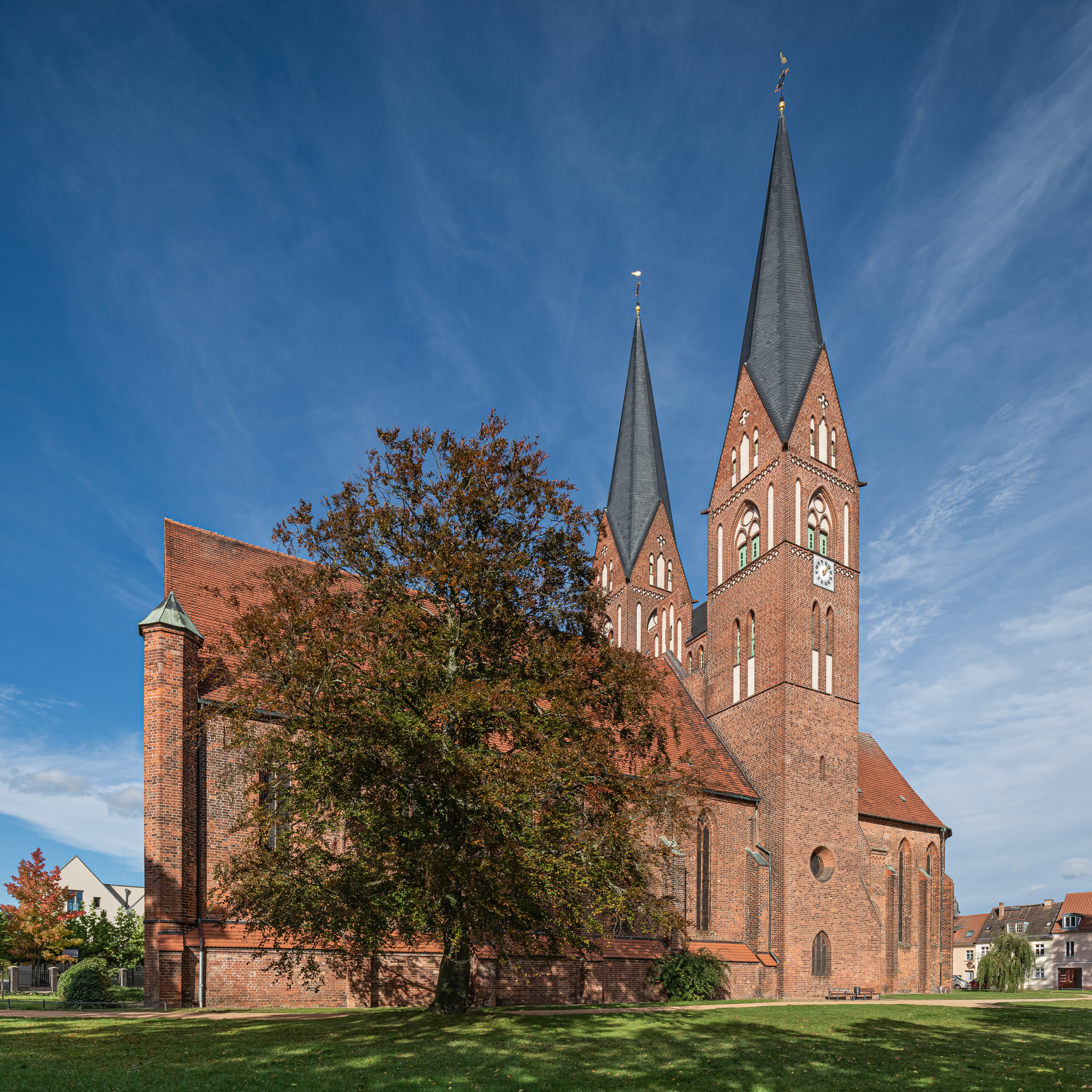
Trinitatiskirche

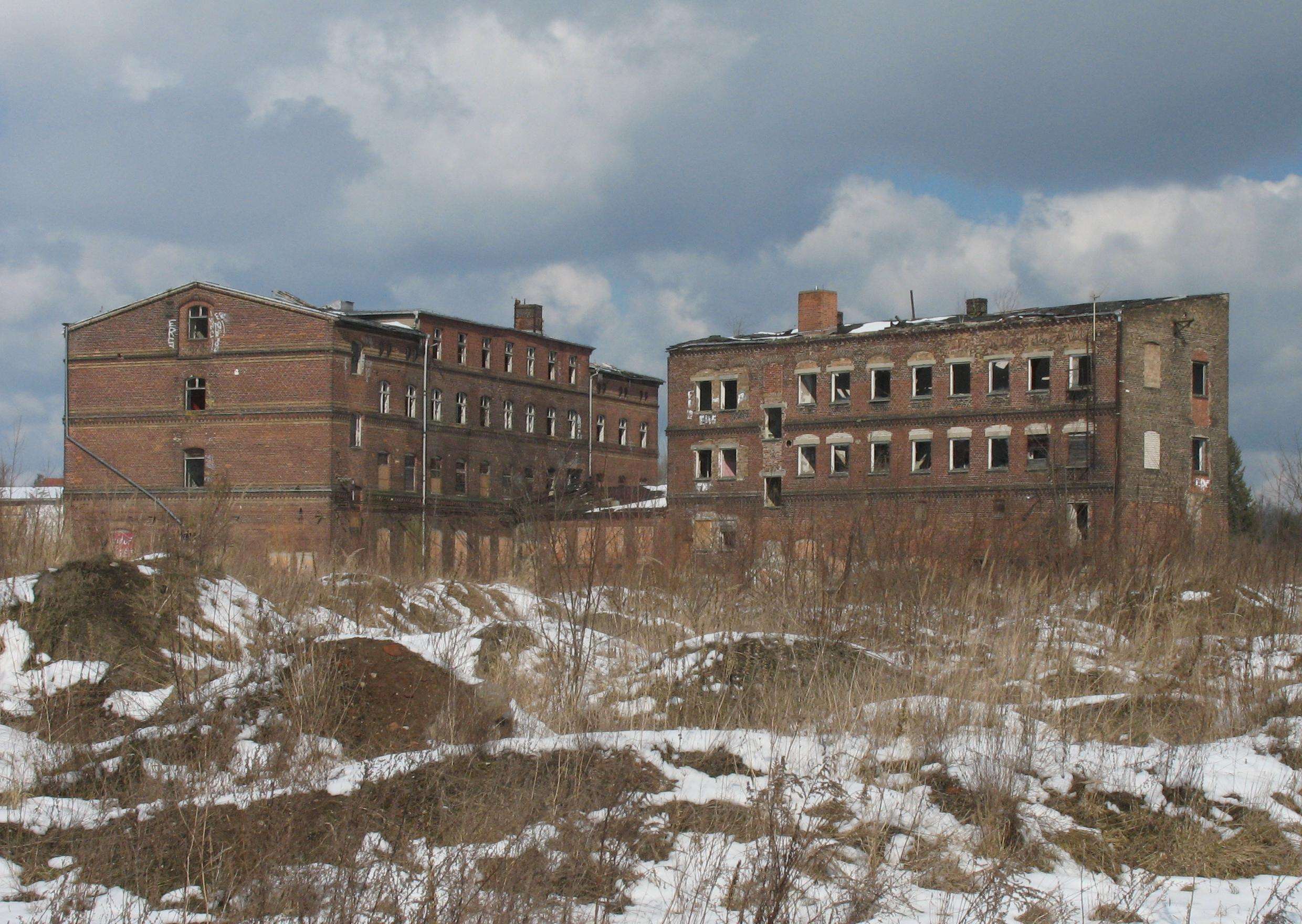
Former fire extinguisher factory

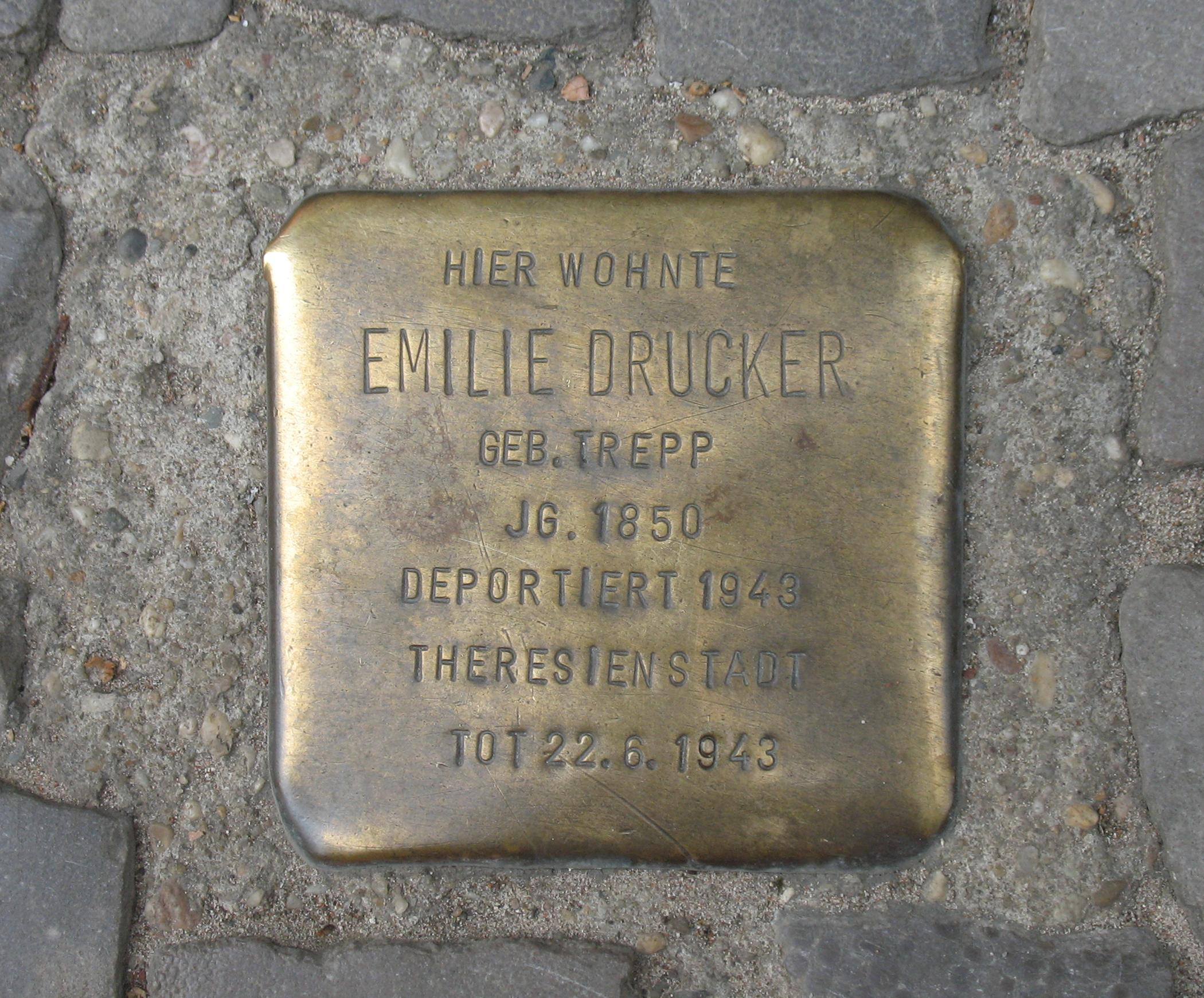
Stolperstein
