= Generali Deutschland =

German holding company

- Company type: Public (FWB: GE1)
- Industry: Insurance
- Founded: 1979
- Headquarters: Munich, Germany
- Key people: Giovanni Liverani, CEO
- Products: Insurance
- Revenue: €14.89 billion
- Number of employees: 9,182
- Parent: Assicurazioni Generali
- Website: www.generali.de

Generali Deutschland AG (until 2008: AMB Generali) is a German holding company consisting of about 20 insurance companies. It is the second largest direct insurance company in Germany after Allianz. Its headquarters is in Munich. Companies Generali Deutschland owns include Generali Versicherungen, AachenMünchener, CosmosDirekt and other. The company is fully owned by the Italian group Assicurazioni Generali.

Since 2015, Giovanni Liverani has been CEO of the Generali Deutschland. In May 2015, he declares his new strategy which includes a renaming into Generali Deutschland (former: Generali Deutschland Holding) and a relocation from Cologne to Munich.

== Economic Activity ==
There are numerous insurers and financial services companies working under the umbrella of Generali Deutschland AG, including Generali Versicherungen, AachenMünchener, CosmosDirekt, Central Krankenversicherung, Advocard Rechtsschutzversicherung, Deutsche Bausparkasse Badenia and Dialog. These companies cover the full spectrum of financial services, such as life, health, property and legal expense insurances, construction financing, as well as additional solutions like third-party asset management and real estate brokerage.

== Key data ==
The operating result for Generali in Germany during fiscal year 2015 was €792 million (+5% vs. 2014). Total contributions for 2015 amounted to €17.8 billion. The insurance group has 13.5 million customers across Germany. As of 31 December 2015, Generali Deutschland had approximately 13,000 employees.
