= North Brandenburg Plateaux and Upland =

Natural region in Germany

Coordinates: 53.0833°N 12.3500°E

North Brandenburg Plateaux and Upland (Nordbrandenburgisches Platten- und Hügelland)
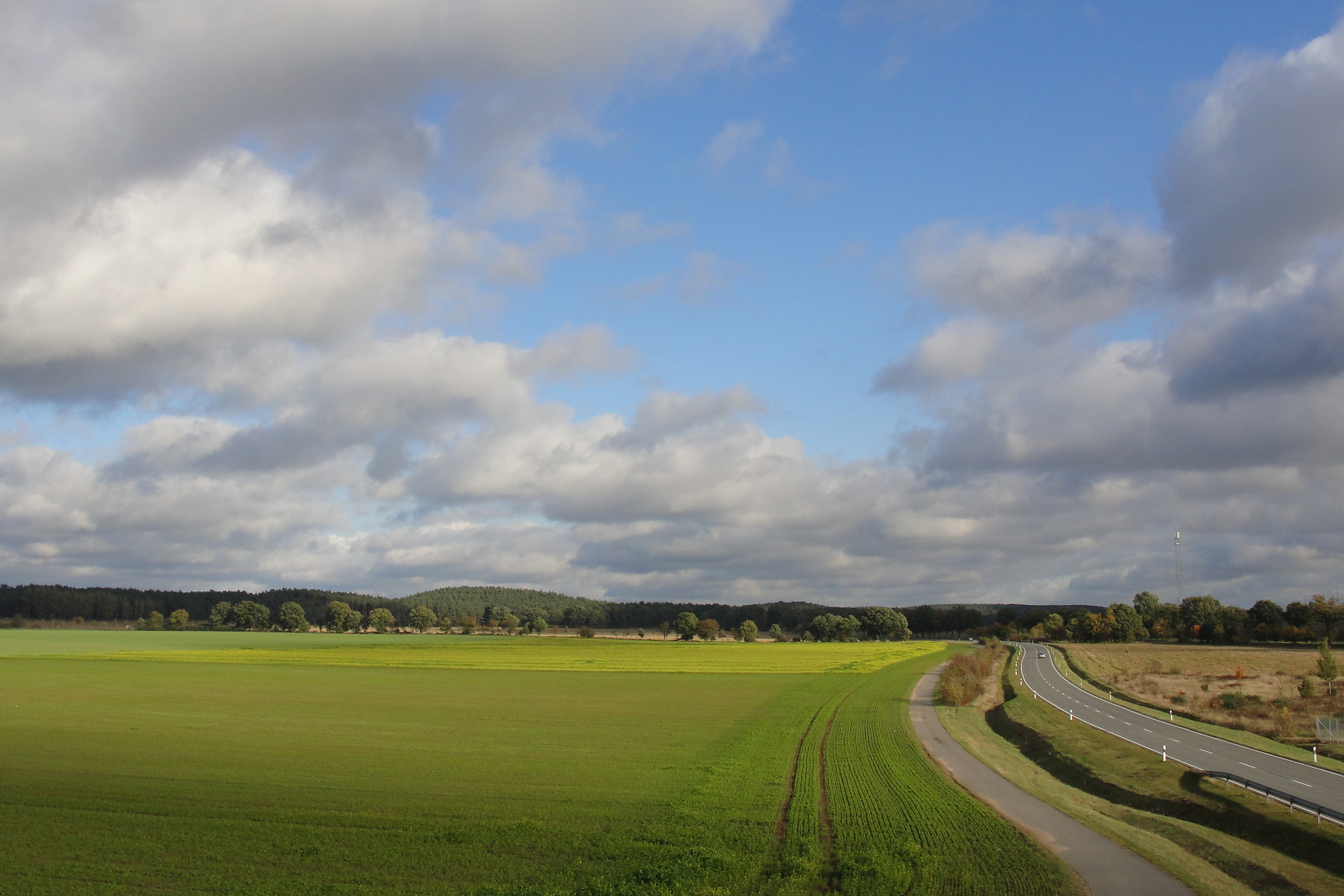
- Countryside near Perleberg

Highest point
- Peak: Ruhner Berg
- Elevation: 176.8 m (580 ft)

Dimensions
- Area: 5,086 km^{2} (1,964 mi^{2})

Geography
- Location: Brandenburg, Mecklenburg-Vorpommern and Saxony-Anhalt
- Country: Germany
- Parent range: HNGD

The North Brandenburg Plateaux and Upland (German: Nordbrandenburgische Platten- und Hügelland) is a natural region in the northwest of Brandenburg and, to a lesser extent, the southwest of Mecklenburg-Vorpommern and northeast of Saxony-Anhalt in Germany. It is major unit group no. 77 in the natural regional divisions of Germany. The Brandenburg portion of the North Brandenburg Plateaux and Upland is largely coextensive with the natural region of Prignitz and Ruppin Land (Prignitz und Ruppiner Land) in the structural atlas of the state of Brandenburg.

== Location ==
The North Brandenburg Plateaux and Upland is part of the North German Plain. It extends from the Elde depression in the west to the Havel in the middle of North Brandenburg. Its neighbouring natural regions are the Southwest Foreland of the Mecklenburg Lake District to the northwest, the Mecklenburg Lake District to the northeast, the Luchland to the southeast and the Elbe Depression to the southwest.

== Description ==
Several ground moraine plateaux of Saale and Weichselian glacial origin form the heart of the North Brandenburg Plateaux and Upland. In addition there are sandur and valley sand areas as well as the push and terminal moraine ridges of the Ruhn Hills with heights of up to zu 176.8 m above sea level (NHN).

With the exceptionof the Gransee Plateau in the east, the land descends mainly from north to south. Correspondingly the countryside is drained by the Elde, Löcknitz, Stepenitz, Dosse and Rhin and their tributaries into the Rhinluch and the Elbe. Through the centre runs the Kyritz Lake Chain and the chain of elongated tunnel valleys around Lake Ruppin. In the east there are more ground moraines; in the west is Lake Rudow.

== Natural regions ==
The North Brandenburg Plateaux and Upland is divided as follows:

- 77 North Brandenburg Plateaux and Upland (Nordbrandenburgische Platten- und Hügelland)
  - 770 Prignitz (1599 km²)
  - 771 Ruhn Hills (Ruhner Berge) (156 km²)
  - 772 Parchim-Meyenburg Sands (Parchim-Meyenburger Sandflächen) (581 km²)
  - 773 Kyritz Plateau (Kyritzer Platte) (401,5 km²)
  - 774 Perleberg Heath (Perleberger Heide)(323 km²)
  - 775 Dosse Valley (Dosseniederung) (362 km²)
  - 776–779 Ruppin Heaths and Plateaux (Ruppiner Heiden und Platten) (1663,5 km²)
    - 776 Wittstock-Ruppin Heath (Wittstock-Ruppiner Heide) (504 km²)
    - 777 Ruppin Plateau (Ruppiner Platte) (485 km²)
    - 778 Gransee Plateau (Granseer Platte) (577 km²)
    - 779 Rüthnick Heath (Rüthnicker Heide) (97,5 km²)

The unit of Ruppin Heaths and Plateaux is seen as only a major unit even though it has four three-figure numbers.

== Literature ==
- Emil Meynen, Josef Schmithüsen et al. (eds.): Handbuch der naturräumlichen Gliederung Deutschlands. Bundesanstalt für Landeskunde, Remagen/Bad Godesberg, 1953–1962 (8th issue, 1961). pp. 1091–1105, Author H. Siggel.
- Eberhard Scholz (1962), Die naturräumliche Gliederung Brandenburgs (in German), Potsdam: Pädagogisches Bezirkskabinett, pp. 74 ff
