= Ruhner Berge (municipality) =

- Municipality
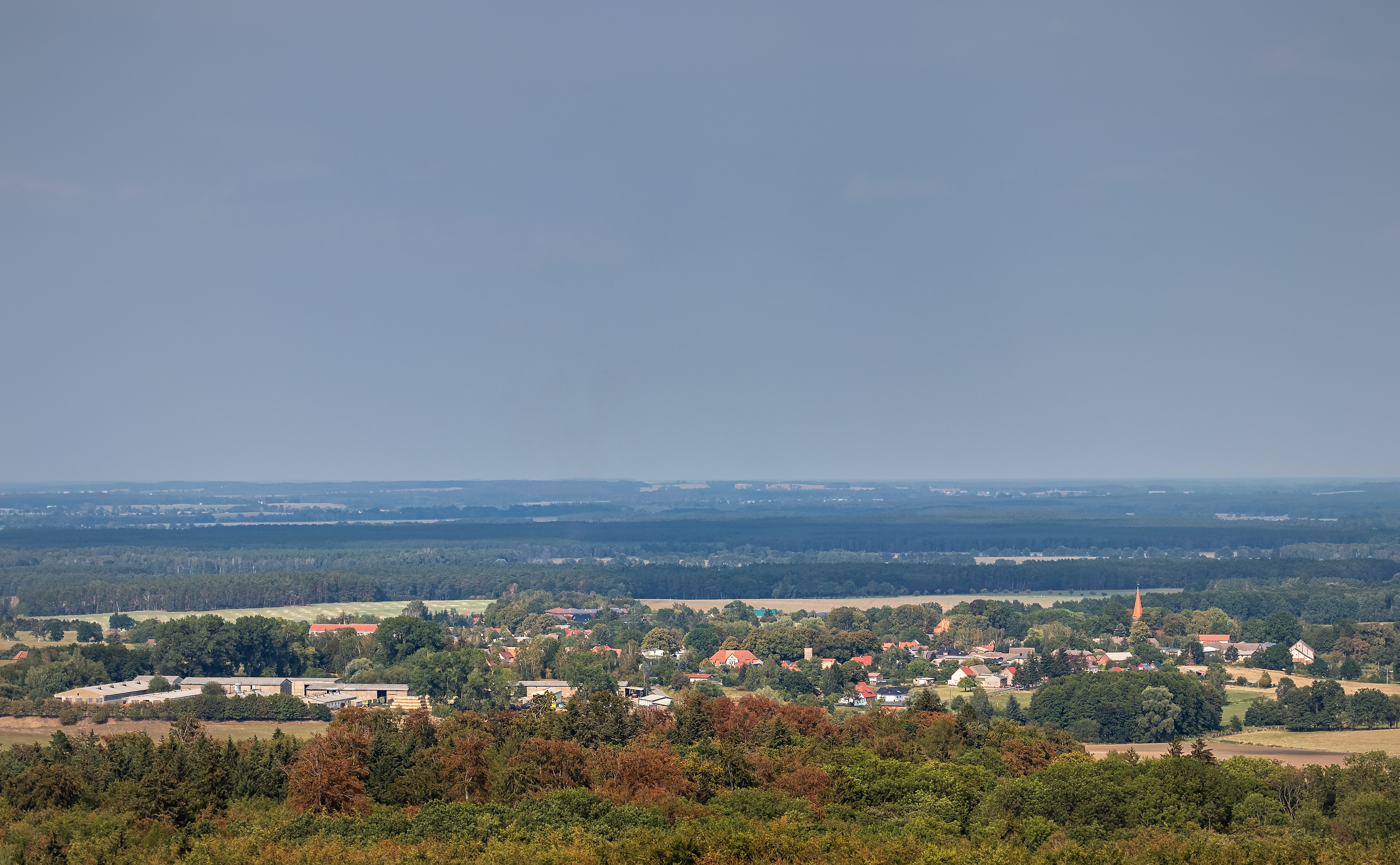

- Location of Ruhner Berge within Ludwigslust-Parchim district
- Interactive map of Ruhner Berge
- Location within Germany Location within Mecklenburg-Vorpommern
- Coordinates: 53°20′N 11°56′E
- Country: Germany
- State: Mecklenburg-Vorpommern
- District: Ludwigslust-Parchim
- Municipal assoc.: Eldenburg Lübz
- Subdivisions: 14

Area
  - Total: 94.25 km^{2} (36.39 sq mi)
- Elevation: 80 m (260 ft)

Population (2025-12-31)
  - Total: 1,720
  - Density: 18.2/km^{2} (47.3/sq mi)
- Time zone: UTC+01:00 (CET)
  - Summer (DST): UTC+02:00 (CEST)
- Postal codes: 19376
- Dialling codes: 038729
- Vehicle registration: PCH
- Website: Amt Eldenburg Lübz

Ruhner Berge (German pronunciation: [ˈʁuːnɐ ˈbɛʁɡə]) is a municipality in the Ludwigslust-Parchim district, in Mecklenburg-Vorpommern, Germany. It was created with effect from 1 January 2019 by the merger of the former municipalities of Marnitz, Suckow and Tessenow. Its name derives from the Ruhner Berge, a chain of hills.
