= Georg Abraham Constantin von Arnim =

Georg Abraham Constantin von Arnim (Schloss Suckow, 10 December 1839 – Berlin, 7 July 1879), 5th Lord of the Fideicomis of Suckow in the Grand Duchy of Mecklenburg-Schwerin, Lord of Nemidchlof and Neu-Körtnitz, was a German soldier and nobleman, son of Georg Wilhelm von Arnim and wife Marie Josephine Ernestine Adamine Gräfin von Blumenthal.

== Career ==
He was a Lieutenant of the Prussian Army and a Knight of Honour of the Order of St. John.

== Marriage and children ==
He married secondly in Klützow on 13 September 1867 Rosalie Augusta Carolina Johanna Ulrika von Schnehen (Altenplatow, 26 September 1843 – Nemischhof, 22 November 1907), daughter of Friedrich Gustav Carl Ulrich Franz von Schnehen and wife Johanna Elisabeth Rosalie von Pieschel, and had issue, among whom a son Georg Gustav von Arnim.
