= Ruhn (disambiguation) =

Rühn is a municipality in Mecklenburg-Vorpommern, Germany.

Ruhn may also refer to:

- Melita Ruhn (born 1965), Romanian artistic gymnast
- Ruhn Hills, Germany
