= Georg Wilhelm von Arnim =

- 4th Lord of the Fideicomis of Suckow
- Known for: Service to the King of Prussia
- Born: October 3, 1806; Schloss Suckow, Grand Duchy of Mecklenburg-Schwerin
- Died: November 9, 1845; Schloss Suckow, Grand Duchy of Mecklenburg-Schwerin
- Spouse: Marie Josephine Ernestine Adamine Gräfin von Blumenthal
- Issue: Georg Abraham Constantin von Arnim
- Occupation: Nobleman, Gentleman of the Bedchamber

Georg Wilhelm von Arnim (Schloss Suckow, 3 October 1806 – Schloss Suchow, 9 November 1845), 4th Lord of the Fideicomis of Suckow in the Grand Duchy of Mecklenburg-Schwerin, was a German nobleman.

== Career ==
He was a Gentleman of the Bedchamber to the King of Prussia.

== Marriage and children ==
He married in Berlin on April 6, 1837, Marie Josephine Ernestine Adamine Gräfin von Blumenthal (Magdeburg, December 18, 1811 – December 27, 1865), and had issue, among whom a son Georg Abraham Constantin von Arnim.
