= Georg Gustav von Arnim =

German officer and nobleman

Georg Gustav von Arnim (Schloss Suckow, September 26, 1870 – Schloss Suchow, August 28, 1945), 6th Lord of the Fideicomis of Suckow in the Grand Duchy of Mecklenburg-Schwerin, was a German military officer and nobleman, son of Georg Abraham Constantin von Arnim and wife Rosalie Augusta Carolina Johanna Ulrika von Schnehen.

== Career ==
He was a chamberlain of the King of Prussia, captain of the Prussian Dragoons and a Knight of the Order of St. John.

== Marriage and children ==
He married in Berlin on September 26, 1893, Hulda Elisabeth Anna von Versen (Merseburg, March 18, 1872 – West Berlin, May 4, 1954, daughter of Maximilian von Versen and Alice Brown Clemens).

Among his children were Marie Agnes von Arnim (Schloss Suckow, August 19, 1903 – Dresder Weissen-Hirsch, May 3, 1938), married in Schloss Suckow on October 7, 1924, to Christoph von Beschwitz (Schloss Arnsdorf, April 2, 1898 – Wiesbaden, September 26, 1980), Lord of the Castle of Arnsdorf in the Kingdom of Saxony, and Knight of the Order of St. John, who had issue.
