= Curt Franz Wenzel Christoph Erdmann Graf Zedtwitz von Moraván und Duppau =

Bohemian-Austrian noble (1822 – 1909)

Curt Franz Wenzel Christoph Erdmann Graf Zedtwitz von Moraván und Duppau (3 October 1822, in Asch – 19 November 1909, in Pressburg), Lord of Duppau in the Duppau Mountains with Sachsengrün in the Kingdom of Bohemia, and of Moraván with Duzó, Hubina, Nagy and Kis-Modó in the Kingdom of Hungary, was an Austrian-Hungarian-Bohemian soldier and nobleman.

== Personal life ==
By birth member of the House of Zedwitz, he was son of Count Sigmund Erdmann Wilhelm Friedrich von Zedtwitz (15 August 1778, in Asch – 7 July 1847, in Asch) and his second wife (m. Schwarzbach, Thuringia, 26 July 1820) Emilie Friederike Henriette Ernestine von Einsiedel (2 July 1798, in Wolftitz – 12 July 1865, in Duppau, Duppau Mountains).

== Career ==
He was a Gentleman of the Bedchamber and a Privy Councillor of the Emperor of Austria and a Lieutenant-Colonel of the Austro-Hungarian Army.

== Marriage and children ==
He married firstly in Weningen-Auma on 6 March 1849 Caroline Adelheid Ernestine von Schönberg (Hain, near Gera, 31 July 1826 – Schloss Moraván, 16 February 1894), daughter of Friedrich August von Schönberg and wife Caroline Christiane Freiin von Brandenstein, and had issue, among whom a daughter Alexandra Emilie Caroline Eugenie Henriette Adele Gräfin Zedtwitz von Moraván und Duppau (Schloss Duppau, 15 September 1861 – Schloss Arnsdorf, 26 July 1945), married in Dresden on 27 January 1885 with Heinrich Moritz Max Freiherr von Beschwitz (Otzdorf, 23 December 1859 – Schloss Arnsdorf, 22 July 1944), Lord of Arnsdorf with Gersdorf and Ottendorf in the Kingdom of Saxony, and had issue.
