= Friedrich August von Schönberg =

Friedrich August von Schönberg (Tannenberg, 12 June 1795 – Dresden, 5 April 1856), Lord of Weningen-Auma, Zodelsdorf and Silberfeld, was a German Nobleman.

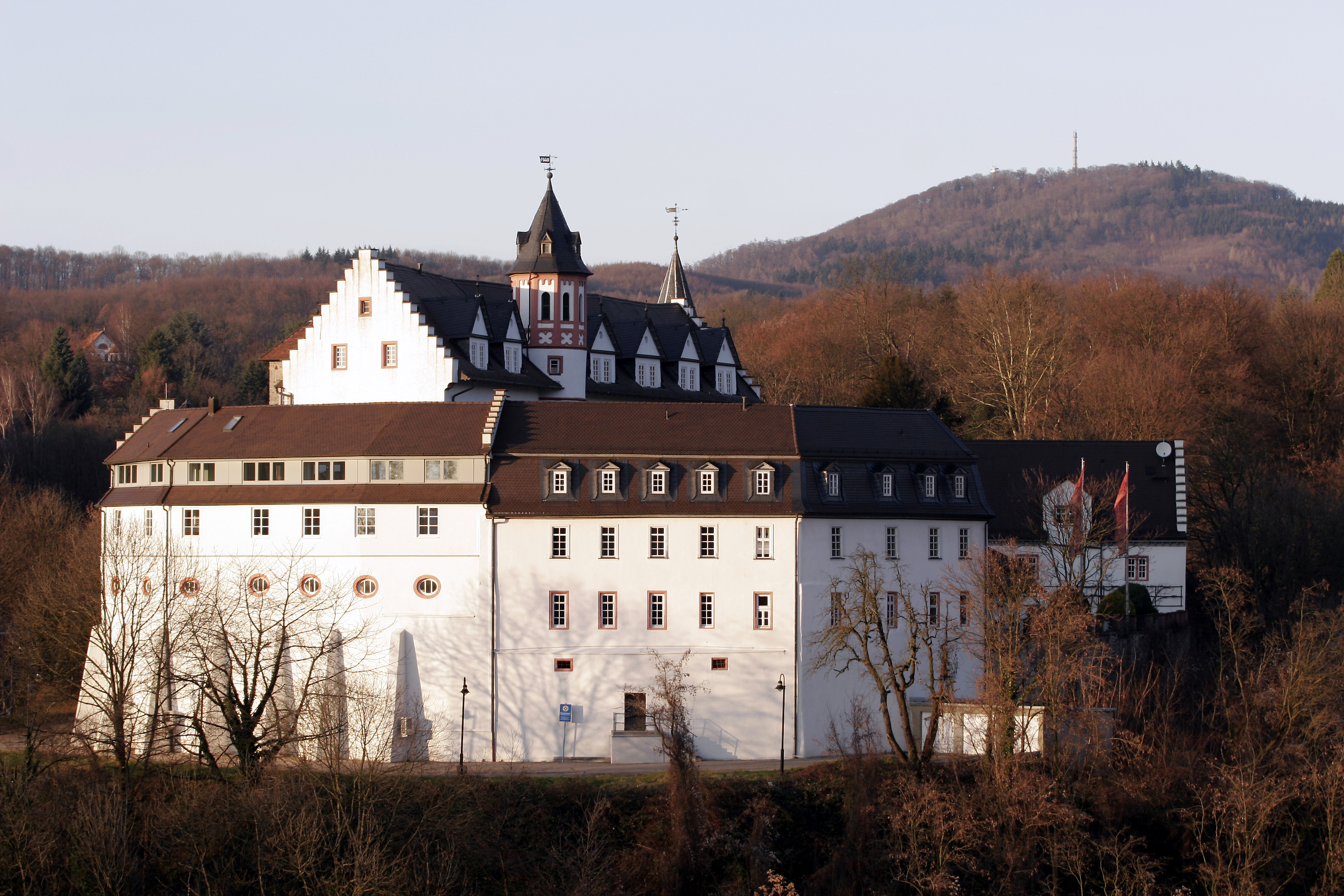
Schloss Schönberg

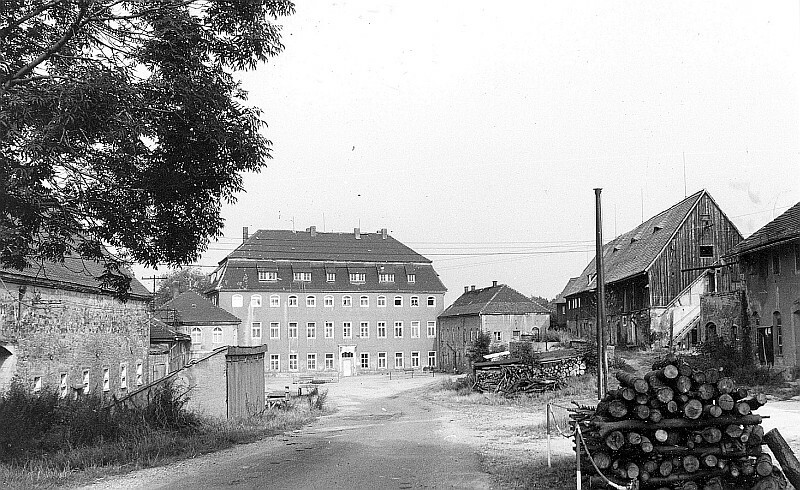
Schloss Tannenberg

== Career ==
He was a Gentleman of the Bedchamber of the Grand Duke of Saxe-Weimar-Eisenach.

== Marriage and children ==
He married in Roschütz on 31 October 1819 Caroline Christiane Freiin von Brandenstein (Gütterlitz, 2 October 1798 – Dresden, 17 October 1880) and had issue, among whom a daughter Caroline Adelheid Ernestine von Schönberg (Hain, near Gera, 31 July 1826 – Schloss Moraván, 16 February 1894), who married as his first wife in Weningen-Auma on 6 March 1849 Curt Franz Wenzel Christoph Erdmann Graf Zedtwitz von Moraván und Duppau (Asch, 3 October 1822 – Pressburg, 19 November 1909), Lord of Duppau in the Duppau Mountains with Sachsengriin in the Kingdom of Bohemia, and of Moraván with Duzó, Hubina, Nagy and Kis-Modó in the Kingdom of Hungary, and had issue.
