= Christoph Moritz Max Freiherr von Beschwitz =

German nobleman

Christoph Moritz Max Freiherr von Beschwitz (2 April 1898 – 26 September 1980) was a German nobleman. Titled Lord of the Castle of Arnsdorf in the Kingdom of Saxony, he was son of Heinrich Moritz Max Freiherr von Beschwitz and wife Alexandra Emilie Caroline Eugenie Henriette Adele Gräfin Zedtwitz von Moraván und Duppau.

== Career ==
He was born on 2 April 1898 in Arnsdorf Castle (today in Vierkirchen, Saxony). He was a knight of Honour of the Order of St. John.

== Marriage and children ==
He married firstly in Suckow Castle on 7 October 1924 Marie Agnes von Arnim (1903–1938), daughter of Georg Gustav von Arnim and wife Hulda Elisabeth Anna von Versen, and had issue, among whom a daughter Verena Marie Agnes Hulda Alexandra Freiin von Beschwitz (1928–1980), married as his first wife at the Roça Canzela, in Quiculungo, Angola, on 9 October 1960 with Dom Miguel Nuno de Sousa Coutinho (born 1930), of the Marquesses (formerly counts) of Funchal and marquesses (formerly viscounts) of Maceió in Brazil.
