= Fehrbellin =

- Municipality
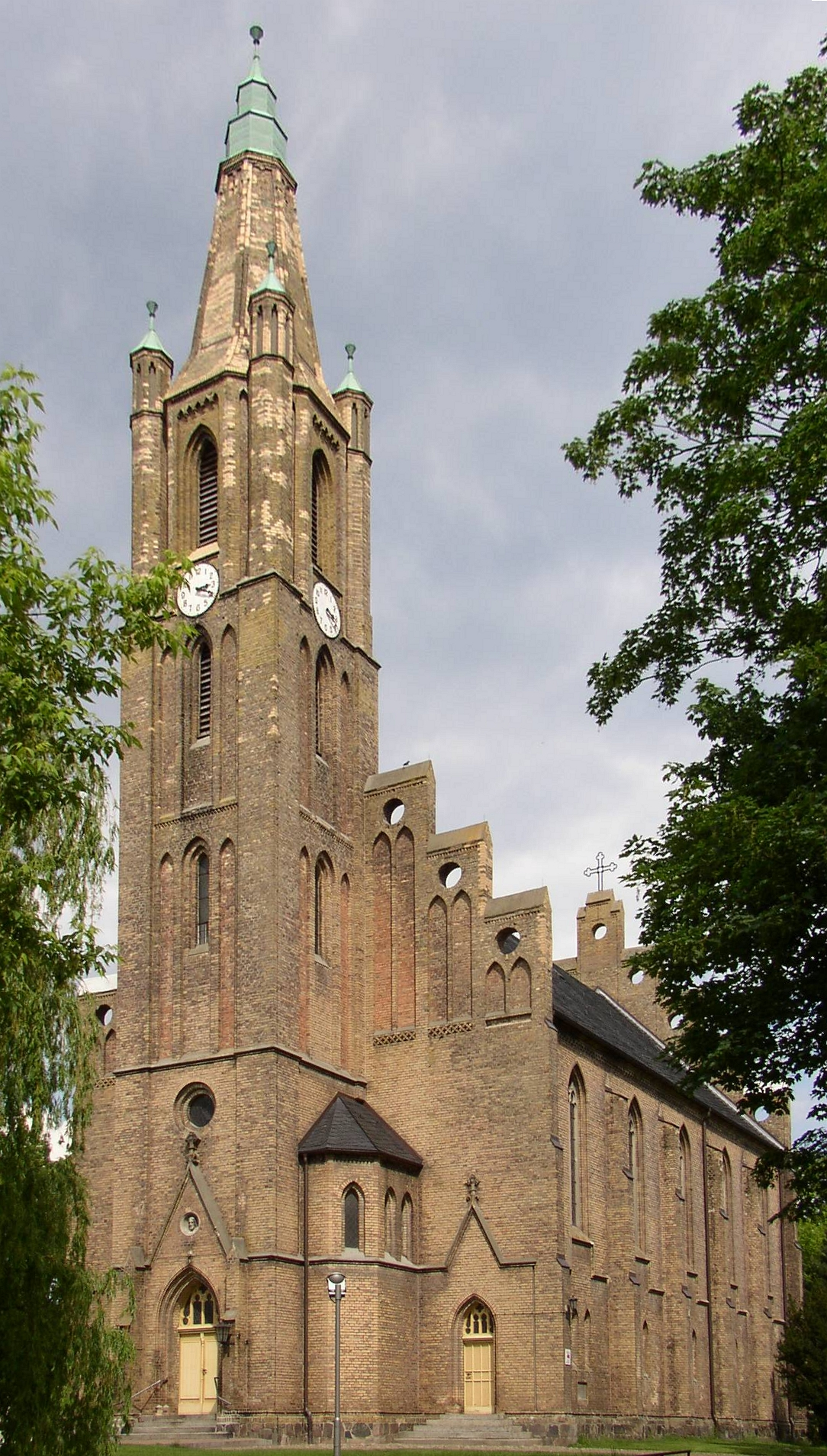

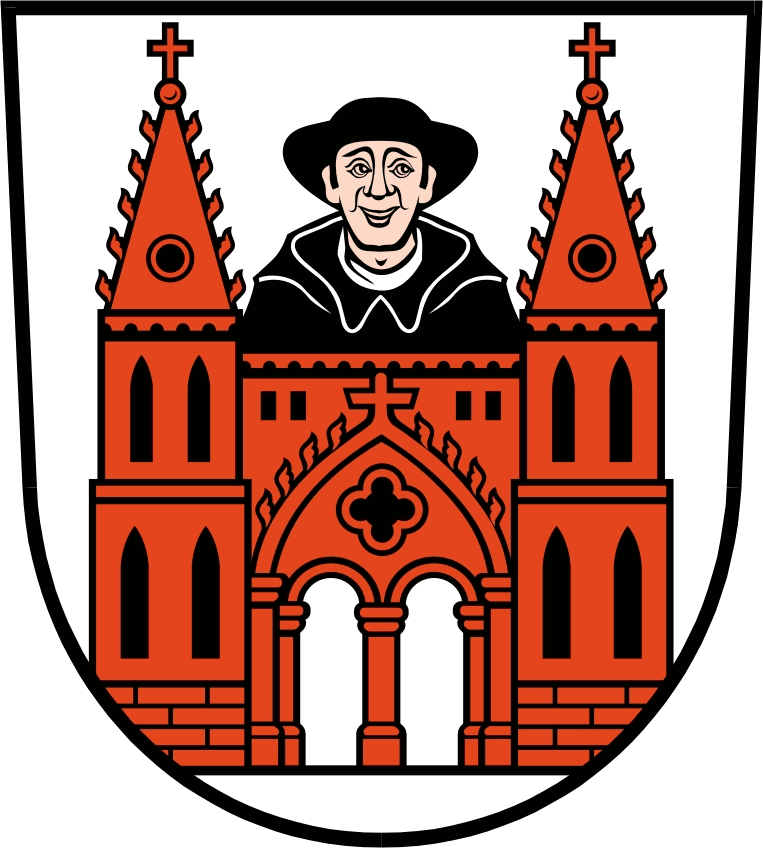
- Coat of arms

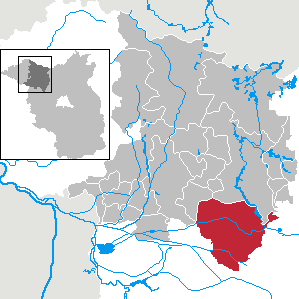
- Location of Fehrbellin within Ostprignitz-Ruppin district
- Interactive map of Fehrbellin
- Location within Germany Location within Brandenburg
- Coordinates: 52°47′59″N 12°46′00″E
- Country: Germany
- State: Brandenburg
- District: Ostprignitz-Ruppin

Government
  - Mayor (2019–27): Mathias Perschall (SPD)

Area
  - Total: 269.06 km^{2} (103.88 sq mi)
- Elevation: 40 m (130 ft)

Population (2025-12-31)
  - Total: 8,946
  - Density: 33.25/km^{2} (86.11/sq mi)
- Time zone: UTC+01:00 (CET)
  - Summer (DST): UTC+02:00 (CEST)
- Postal codes: 16833
- Dialling codes: 033932
- Vehicle registration: OPR
- Website: www.fehrbellin.de

Fehrbellin (German pronunciation: [ˌfeːɐ̯bɛˈliːn]) is a municipality in Germany, located 60 km NW of Berlin. It had 9,310 inhabitants as of 2005, but has since declined to 8,606 inhabitants in 2012.

== History ==
In 1675, the Battle of Fehrbellin was fought there, in which the troops of Brandenburg-Prussia defeated those of the occupying Swedish Empire. In 1758 during the Seven Years' War Prussian and Swedish forces clashed at the Battle of Fehrbellin (1758).

From 1815 to 1945, Fehrbellin was part of the Prussian Province of Brandenburg. From 1952 to 1990, it was part of the Bezirk Potsdam of East Germany.

One of the most important skydiving dropzones of Germany is located at the local airport.

== Municipal divisions ==
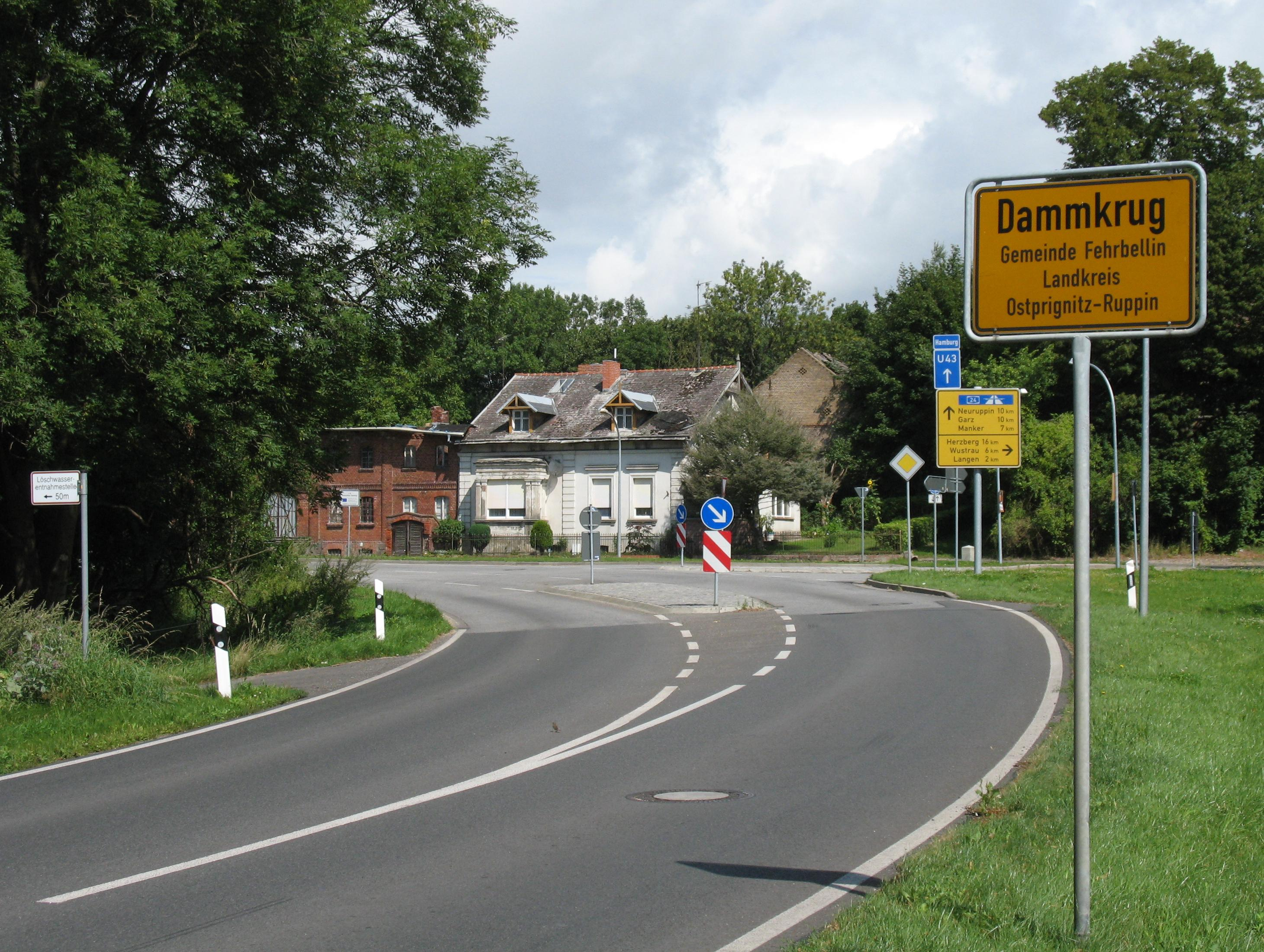
Dammkrug

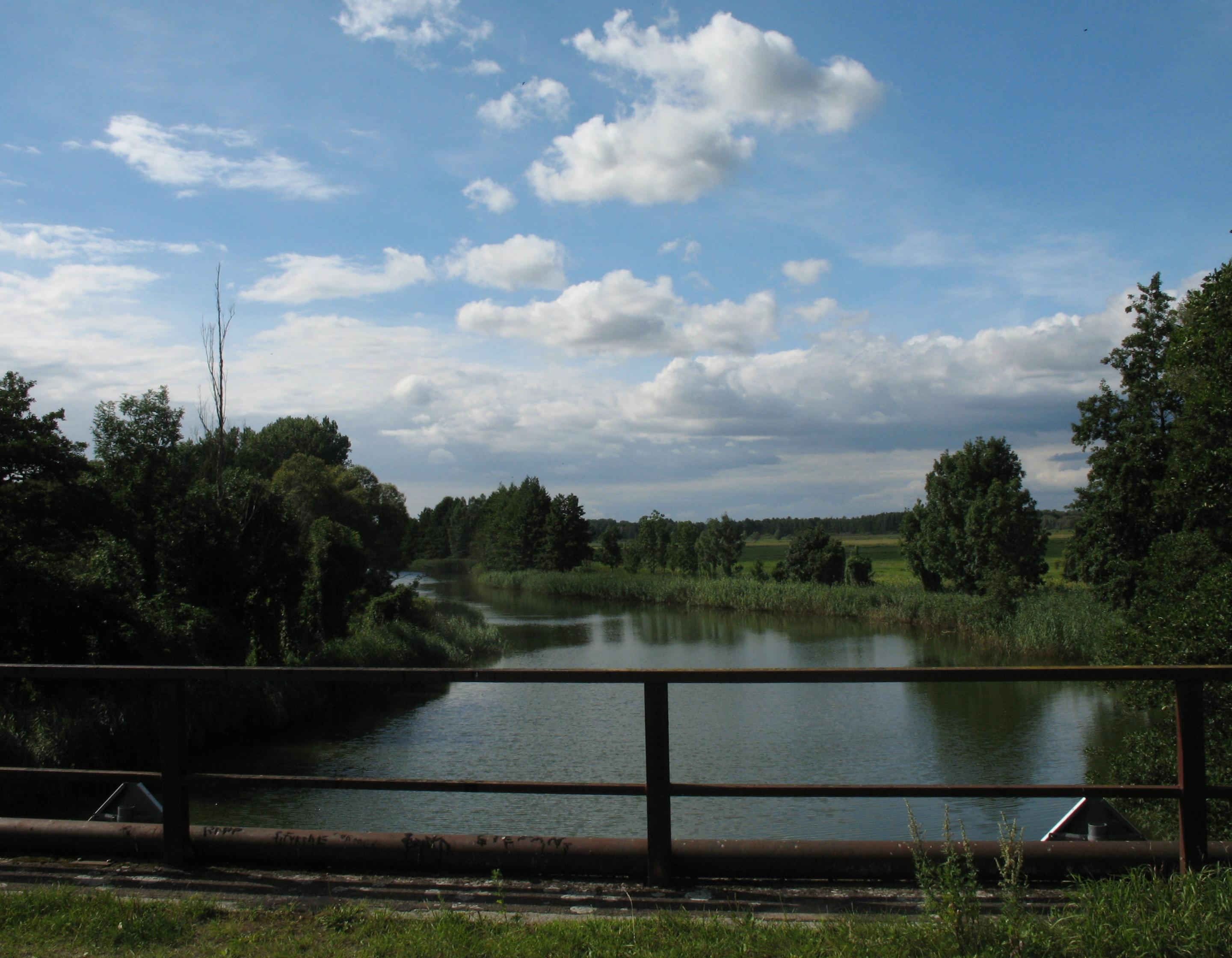
Bützrhin near Wall

- Fehrbellin
- Betzin
- Brunne
- Dechtow
- Deutschhof
- Hakenberg
- Karwesee
- Königshorst
- Langen
- Lentzke
- Linum
- Manker
- Protzen
- Tarmow
- Walchow
- Wall
- Wustrau-Altfriesack

Wustrau and Altfriesack were amalgamated in 1970. With 1221 residents, the combined municipal division is the largest in the municipality. Altfriesack lies between the Ruppiner See and the Bützsee and belonged to Alt Ruppin until 1872. By area, Fehrbellin is the second-largest rural municipality ("Gemeinde") in Germany, trailing only Nuthe-Urstromtal.

== Demography ==
Development of population since 1875 within the current Boundaries (Blue Line: Population; Dotted Line: Comparison to Population development in Brandenburg state; Grey Background: Time of Nazi Germany; Red Background: Time of communist East Germany)

Recent Population Development and Projections — Population Development before Census 2011 (blue line); Recent Population Development according to the Census in Germany in 2011 (blue bordered line); Official projections for 2005-2030 (yellow line); for 2017-2030 (scarlet line); for 2020-2030 (green line)

Fehrbellin: Population development
within the current boundaries (2020)

Year	Pop.	±% p.a.
1875	12,109	—
1890	11,107	−0.57%
1910	9,758	−0.65%
1925	10,121	+0.24%
1939	10,271	+0.11%
1950	15,639	+3.90%
1964	11,807	−1.99%

Year	Pop.	±% p.a.
1971	11,582	−0.27%
1981	10,369	−1.10%
1985	10,163	−0.50%
1990	9,863	−0.60%
1995	9,618	−0.50%
2000	9,718	+0.21%
2005	9,278	−0.92%

Year	Pop.	±% p.a.
2010	8,771	−1.12%
2015	8,829	+0.13%
2016	8,849	+0.23%
2017	8,886	+0.42%
2018	8,948	+0.70%
2019	8,943	−0.06%
2020	8,971	+0.31%

== Sights ==
- Hakenberg Victory Column
- Zietenschloß in Wustrau
- Brandenburg-Preußen Museum
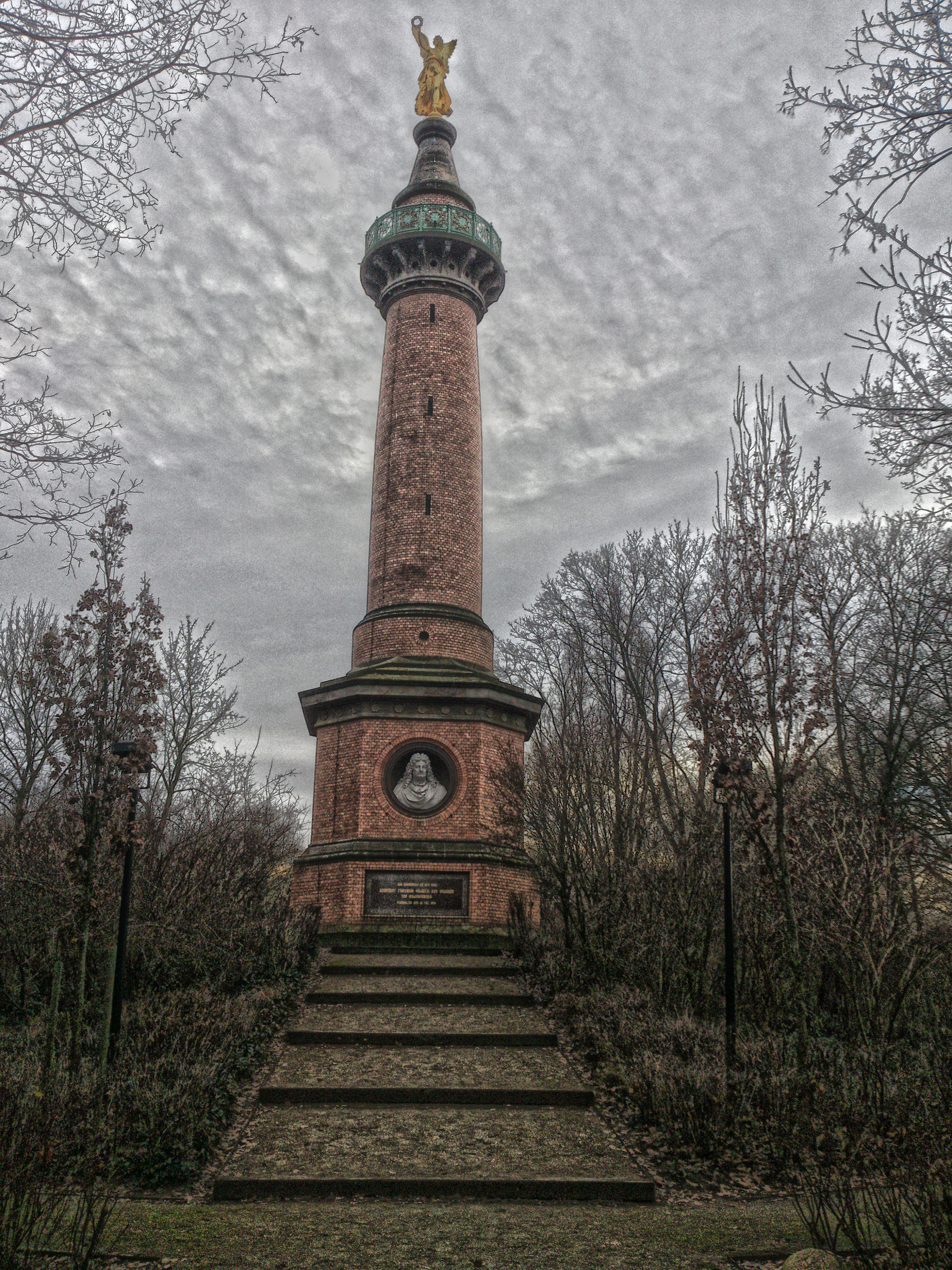
Hakenberg Victory Column

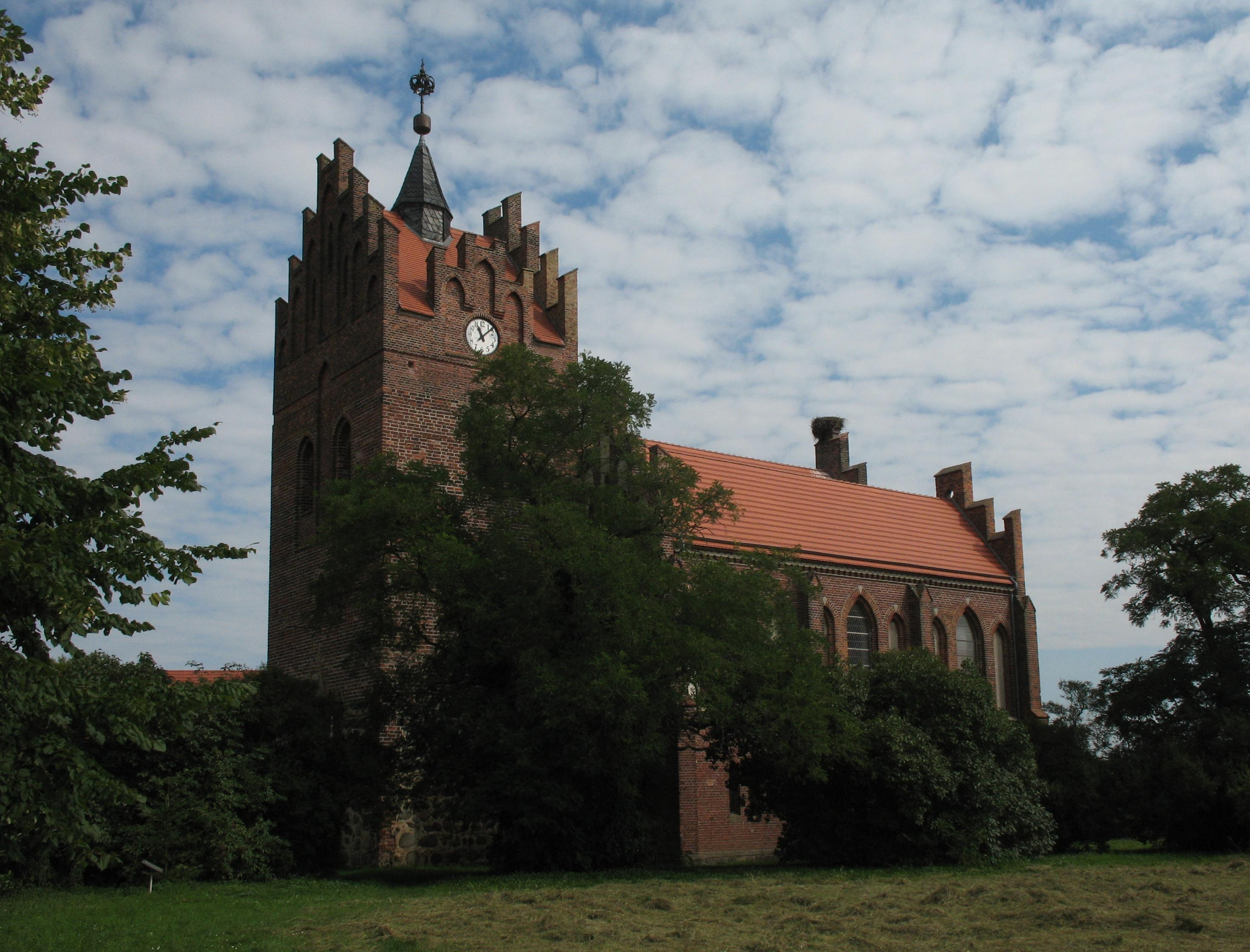
Church in Linum

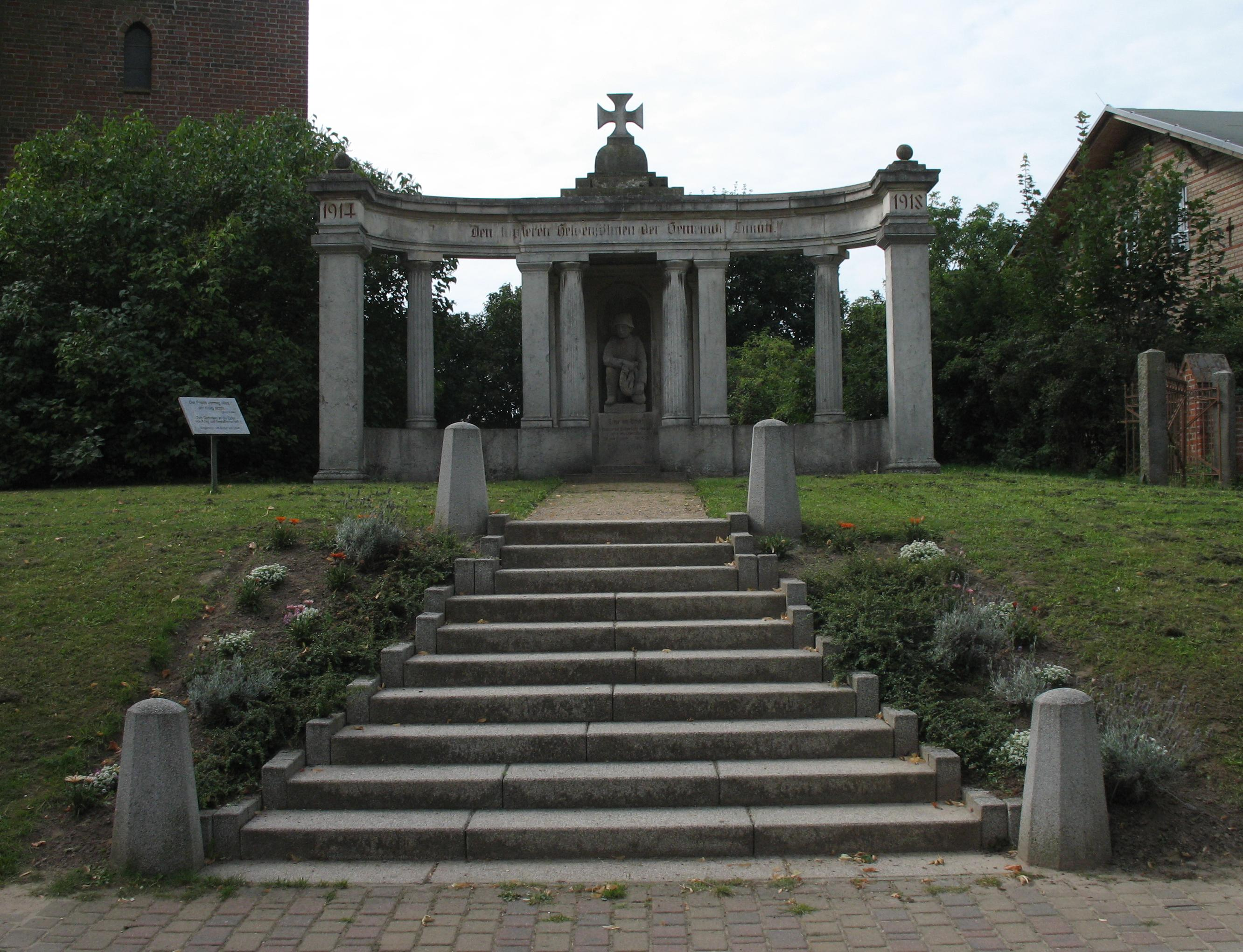
War memorial in Linum

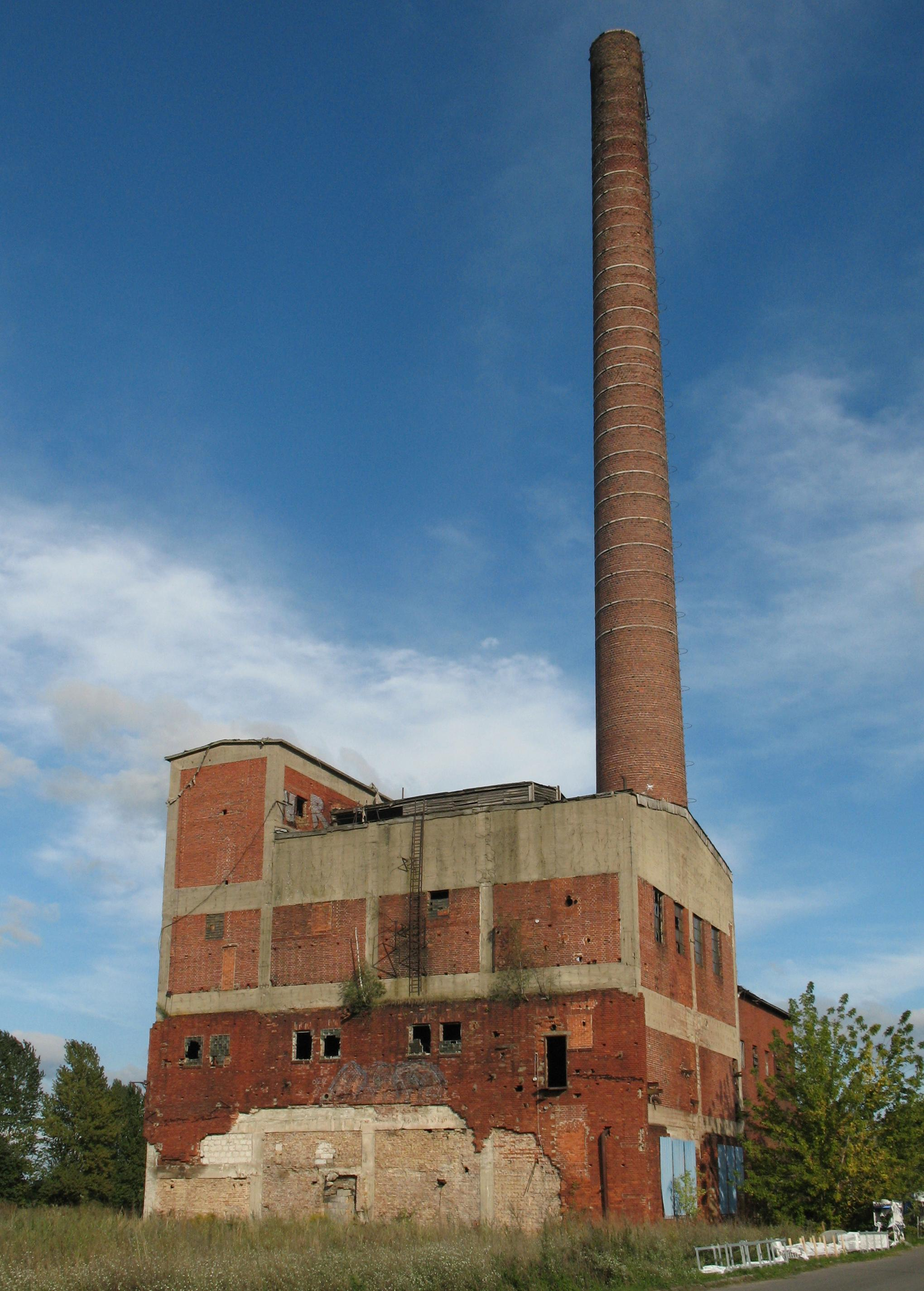
Former textile factory in Fehrbellin

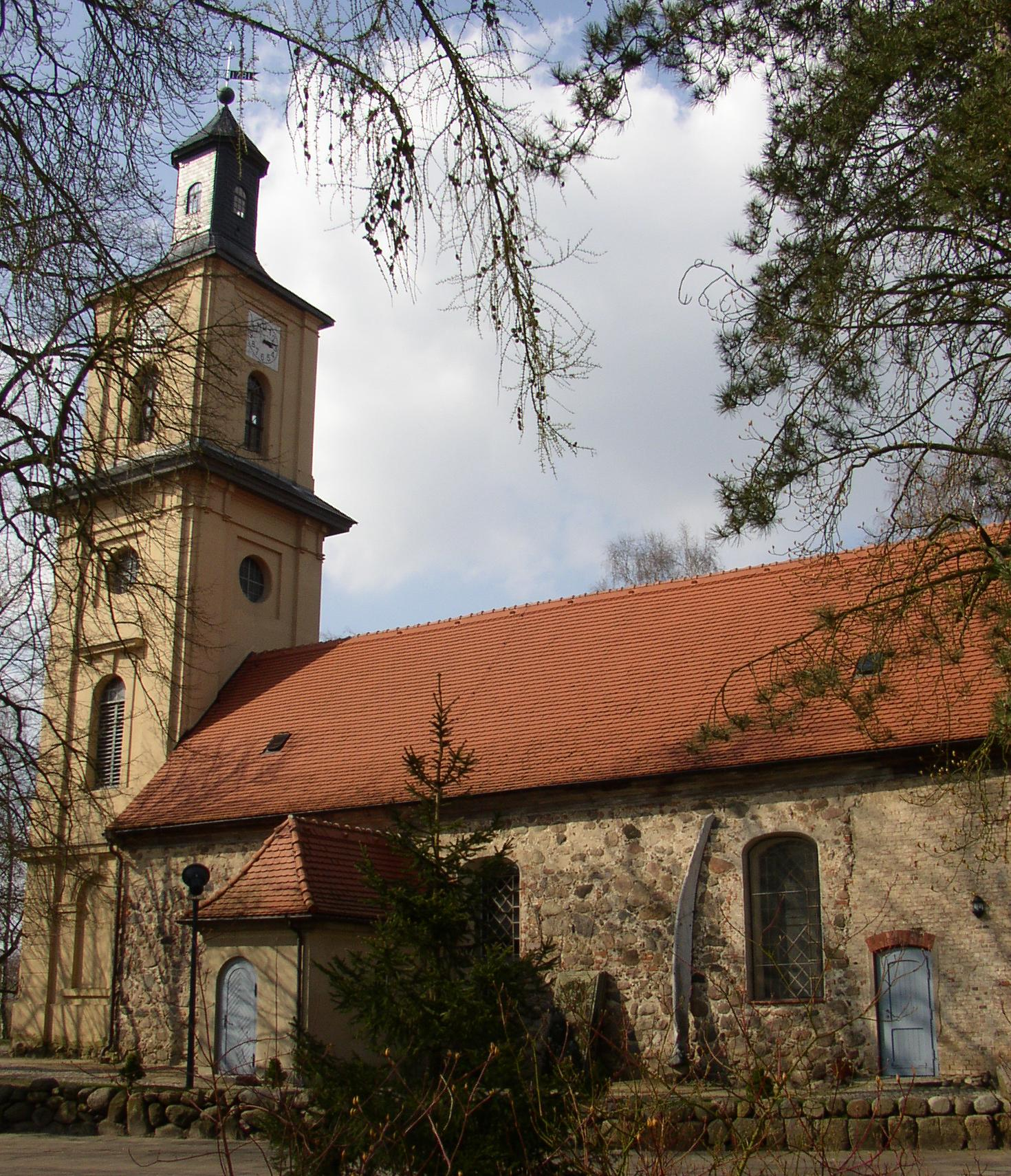
Church in Wustrau

== Personalities ==
- Hans Joachim von Zieten (1699–1786), Prussian cavalry general, born and buried in Wustrau.
- Hans Ernst Karl, Graf von Zieten (1770–1848), Prussian general field marshal
