= Hakenberg Victory Column =

Military monument in Brandenburg, Germany

- Germany
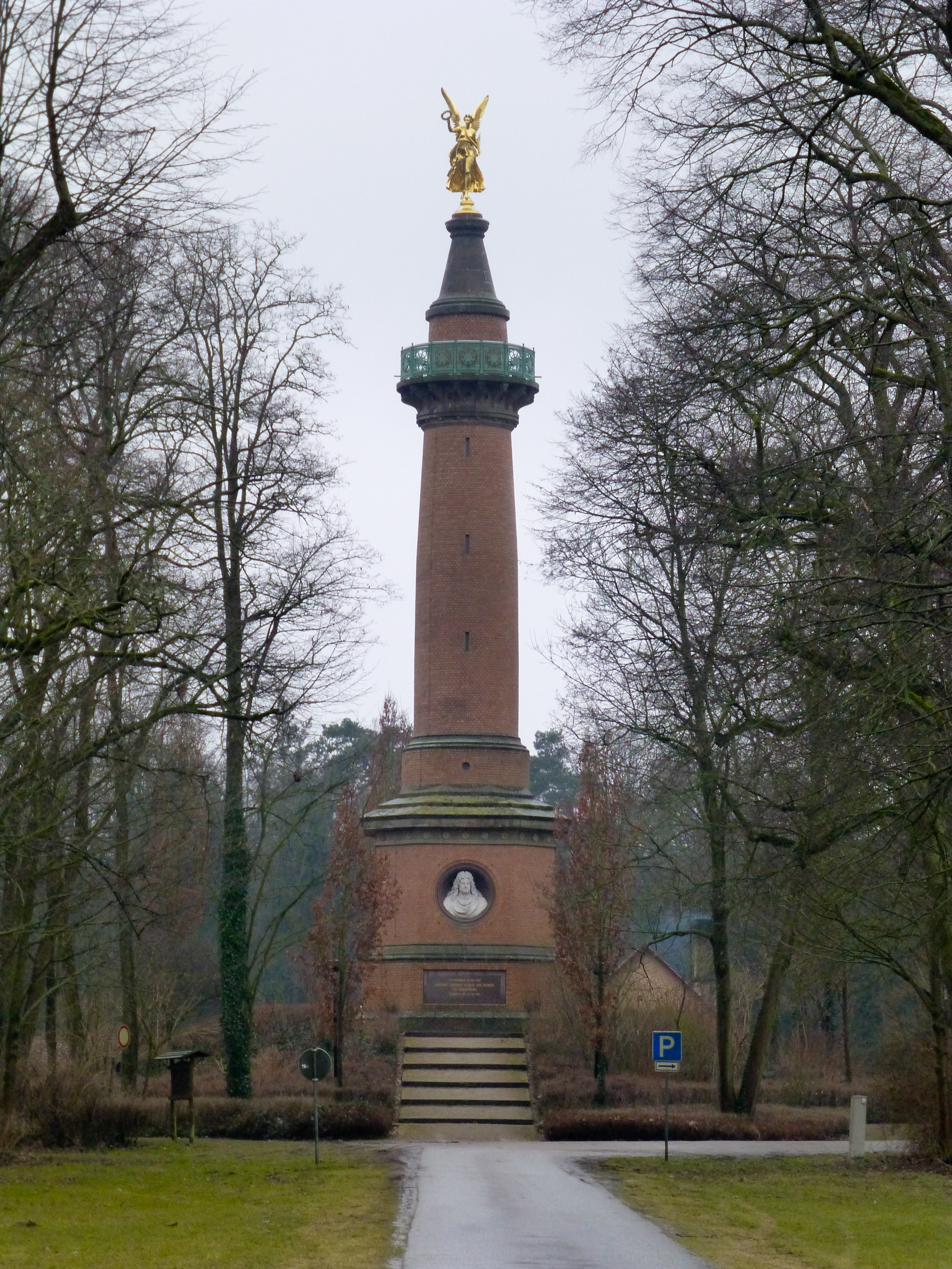
- Hakenberg Victory Column
- For Victory of Frederick William, Elector of Brandenburg, over the troops of occupying Sweden in the Battle of Fehrbellin (1675)
- Established: 1879
- Location: 52°46′16″N 12°49′44″E; Fehrbellin near Hakenberg
- Designed by: Paul Emmanuel Spieker

The Hakenberg Victory Column is a 36-metre tall monument with an observation deck at Hakenberg near Fehrbellin in Brandenburg, Germany.

It was designed by Paul Emmanuel Spieker and built between 1875 and 1879. It commemorates the victory of Frederick William, Elector of Brandenburg, over the troops of occupying Sweden in the Battle of Fehrbellin (1675). It is made out of bricks and sandstone.

== See also ==
- List of towers
