= Moritz Wilhelm Wolf Freiherr von Beschwitz =

Moritz Wilhelm Wolf Freiherr von Beschwitz (Krebs, 10 July 1823 – Schloss Arnsdorf, 31 August 1889), Lord of the Fideicomis of Arnsdorf in the Kingdom of Saxony, was a German soldier and nobleman, son of Ferdinand Freiherr von Beschwitz and wife Augusta Amalie von Oppel.

== Career ==
He was a Captain of the Army of the Kingdom of Saxony and a Knight of Honour of the Order of St. John.

== Marriage and children ==
On 26 November 1856 he married, in Dresden, Alexandra von Hesse (Riga, 24 October 1834 – Bad Schandau, 8 September 1914), daughter of Johann von Hesse and wife Anna Maria Wöhrmann, and had issue, among whom a son Heinrich Moritz Max Freiherr von Beschwitz.
