= Heinrich Moritz Max Freiherr von Beschwitz =

Heinrich Moritz Max Freiherr von Beschwitz (Otzdorf, 23 December 1859 – Schloss Arnsdorf, 22 July 1944), Lord of Arnsdorf with Gersdorf (now part of Ottendorf-Okrilla) and Ottendorf in the Kingdom of Saxony, was a German soldier and nobleman, son of Moritz Wilhelm Wolf Freiherr von Beschwitz and his wife Alexandra von Hesse.

== Career ==
He was a Gentleman of the Bedchamber to the King of Saxony, Captain of Cavalry and a Knight of the Order of St. John.

== Marriage and children ==
He married in Dresden on 27 January 1885 Alexandra Emilie Caroline Eugenie Henriette Adele Gräfin Zedtwitz von Moraván und Duppau (Schloss Duppau, 15 September 1861 – Schloss Arnsdorf, 26 July 1945), daughter of Curt Franz Wenzel Christoph Erdmann Graf Zedtwitz von Moraván und Duppau and wife Caroline Adelheid Ernestine von Schönberg, and had issue, among whom a son Christoph Moritz Max Freiherr von Beschwitz.
