= Ferdinand Freiherr von Beschwitz =

German Nobleman

Ferdinand Freiherr von Beschwitz (26 December 1798 – 26 August 1874), Lord of the Castle of Arnsdorf in the Kingdom of Saxony, was a German nobleman and a landowner.

== Early life ==
He was born in Arnsdorf, as the only son of Freiherr Ferdinand Heinrich Moritz von Beschwitz (1765-1812) and his wife, Friederike Auguste von Tümpling (d. 1842).

== Marriage and children ==
On 15 August 1822 he married Augusta Amalie von Oppel (10 March 1803 – Dresden, 13 March 1879) and had issue, among whom a son Moritz Wilhelm Wolf Freiherr von Beschwitz and a daughter Marie, Countess of Lippe-Weissenfeld (1836-1921), mother in law of Anna, Princess of Lippe.
