= Ruppiner See =

Lake in Germany

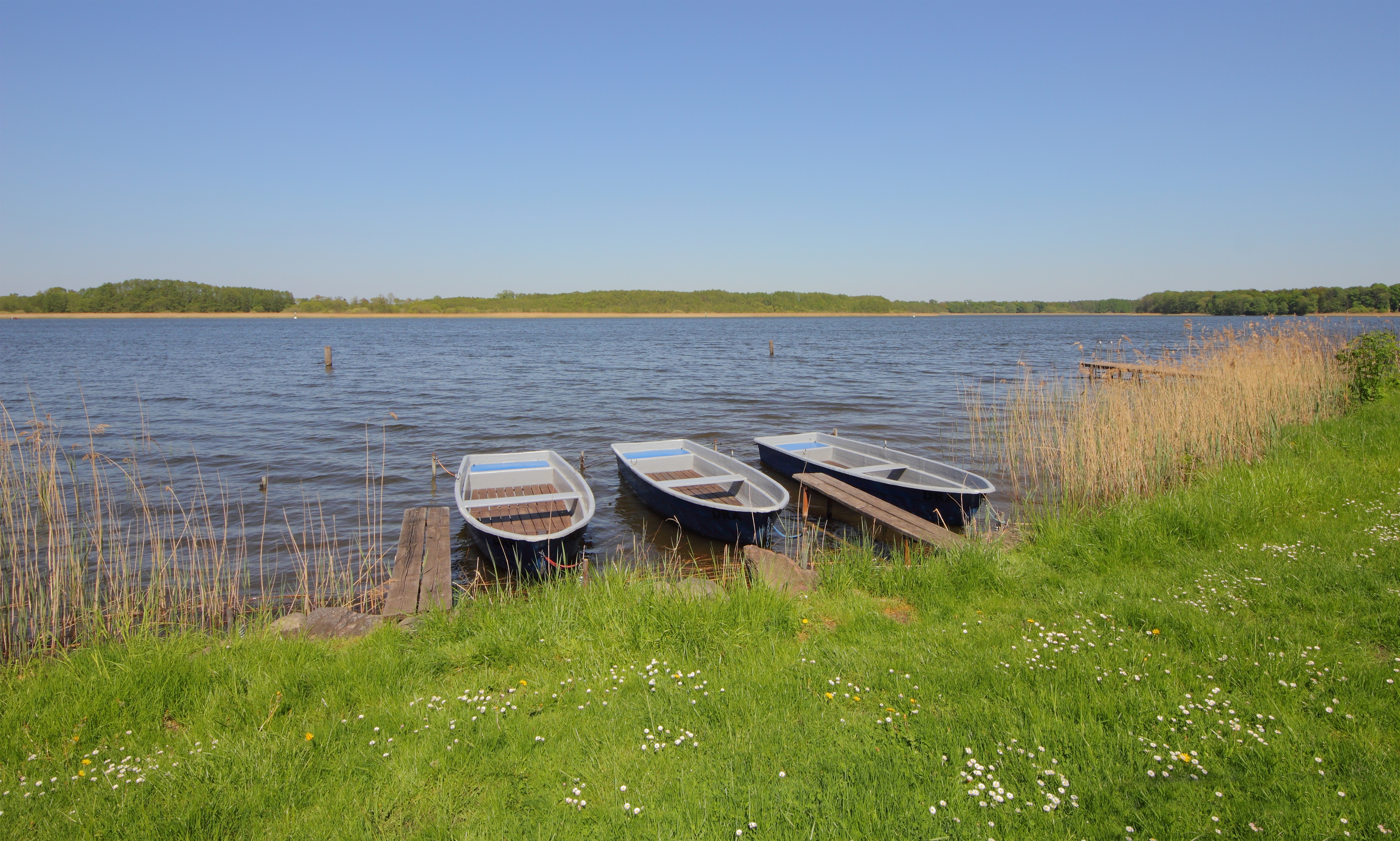

- Location within Brandenburg

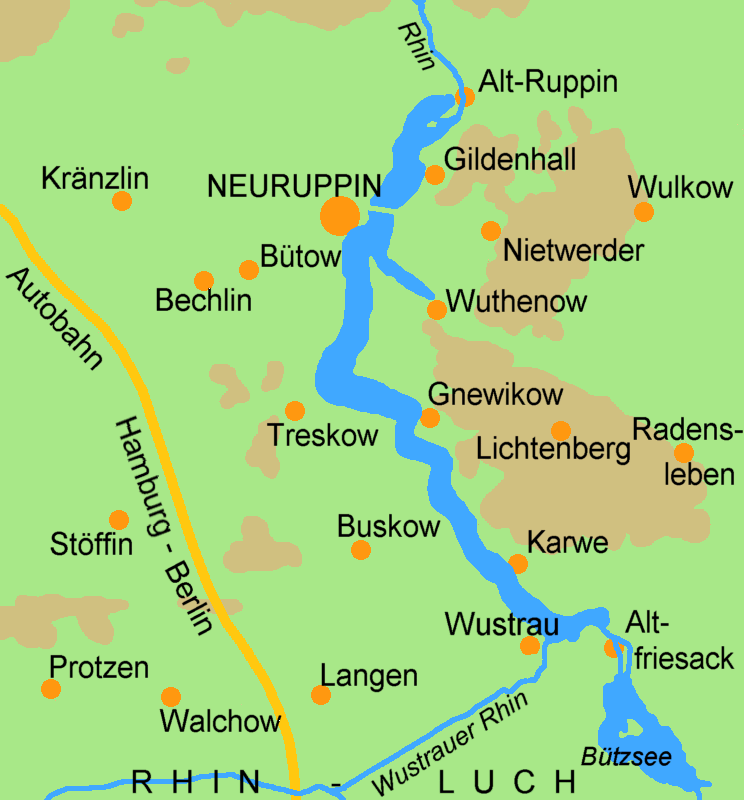
- Location: Ostprignitz-Ruppin, Brandenburg
- Coordinates: 52°53′51″N 12°48′27″E
- Primary inflows: Rhin
- Primary outflows: Rhin
- Basin countries: Germany
- Surface area: 8.25 km^{2} (3.19 sq mi)
- Average depth: 12 m (39 ft)
- Max. depth: 23 m (75 ft)
- Surface elevation: 36.5 m (120 ft)

Ruppiner See is a lake in Ostprignitz-Ruppin, Brandenburg, Germany. At an elevation of 36.5 m (120 ft), its surface area is 8.25 km^{2} (3.19 sq mi). It is believed to have formed as a glacial tunnel valley.

== History ==
A Slavic fortification stood at the mouth of the Rhin on the northern shore. In the 12th century, the German settlement of Ruppin (now called Altruppin) was established next to it. A few decades later, Neuruppin was established on the southwest shore. A mill was built in Altfriesack, between the Ruppiner See and the Bützsee next to the Slavic settlement of Wustrau. The latter is probably the oldest settlement on the lake. Around the lake are other villages, which mostly now belong to the municipality of Neuruppin. Wustrau and Altfriesack now form one division in the municipality of Fehrbellin.

== Economic and strategic importance ==
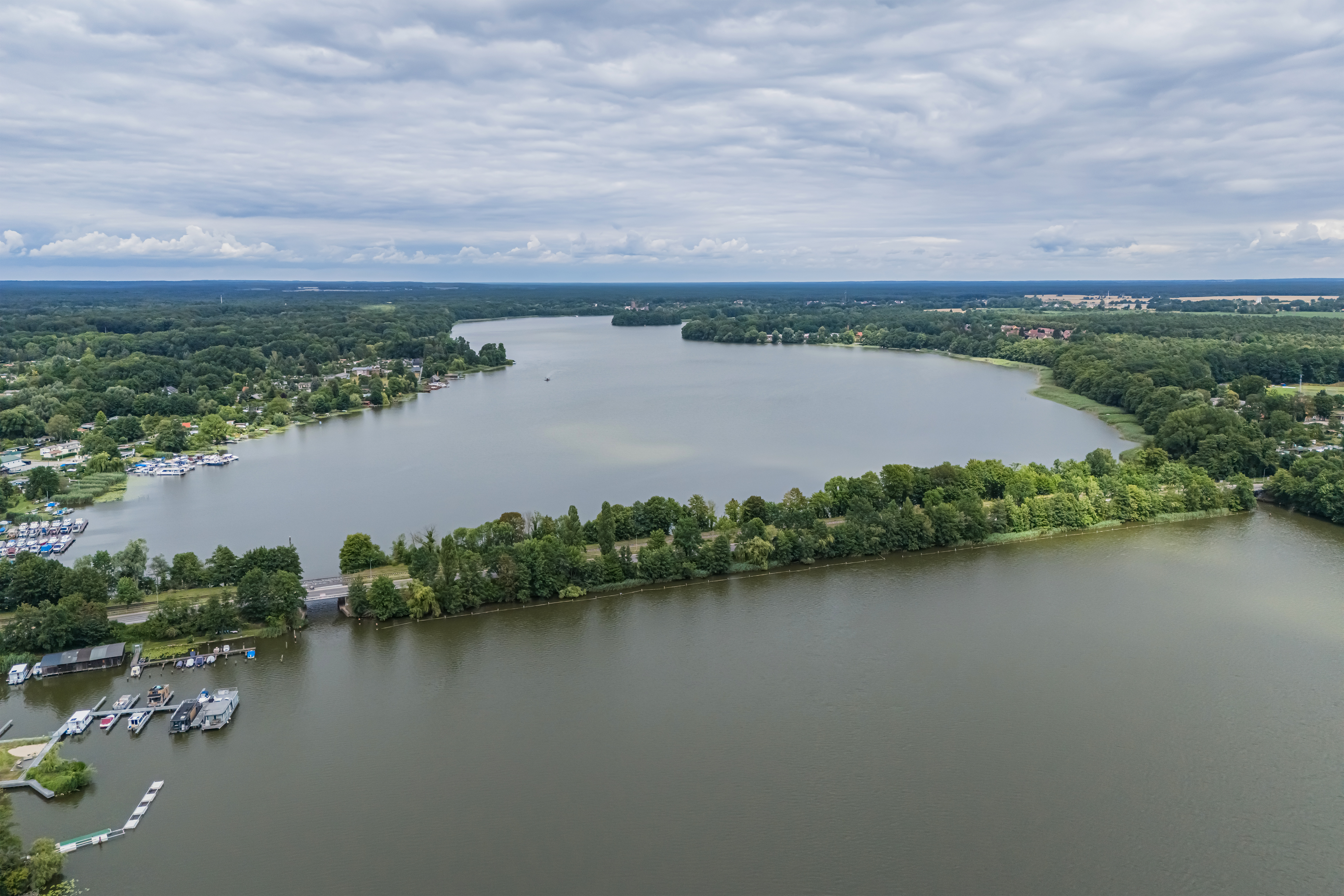
The railroad causeway at Neuruppin

The lake was strategically important as it was the center of the Slavic area. It was also of economic importance due to its fisheries and for transportation. The building of the Ruppiner Canal in 1788 increased its importance, as it was then connected to the Havel and thereby with Berlin.

Since 1898, a railroad causeway on the Kremmen–Wittstock line has cut the lake in two, 2.5 km from the north shore running east and west.

Today, the Ruppiner See is the reservoir for the wetlands known as the Rhinluch. Until the beginning of May, water is held there from the spring runoff. It is then released over the locks in Alt Friesack to prevent the wetlands from drying out. The management of this runoff has the potential for political conflict.

== See also ==
- Neuruppin
