= List of hills of Mecklenburg-Vorpommern =

This List of hills of Mecklenburg-Vorpommern shows a selection of hills in the German federal state of Mecklenburg-Vorpommern – sorted by height in metres above sea level (NN):

Name, Height, Location (District(s), landscape region)

1. Helpt Hills (Helpter Berge, 179 m), highest point in Mecklenburgische Seenplatte District, near Woldegk
2. Ruhner Berg (176.6 m), highest point in Ludwigslust-Parchim District, Ruhn Hills, near Marnitz
3. Dachsberg (172.4 m), Ludwigslust-Parchim District, Ruhn Hills
4. Vogelkirsche (166.0 m), Mecklenburgische Seenplatte District, hill not far from Schlicht near Feldberg
5. Piekberg (160.9 m), highest hill in Vorpommern-Rügen District and Rügen Island, Jasmund National Park
6. Petersilienberg (154 m), Mecklenburgische Seenplatte District, Helpt Hills
7. Marnitzer Höhe not far from Matzdorf (153.1 m), Mecklenburgische Seenplatte District, highest hill in the Brohm Hills
8. Trenzer Berg (150.6 m), Vorpommern-Rügen District, Jasmund National Park, Rügen Island
9. Boner Berg (147.2 m), Vorpommern-Rügen District, Jasmund National Park, Rügen Island
10. Langer Berg (147 m), highest point in Rostock District, Hohe Burg and Schwarzer See nature reserve, Rugberg
11. Rosenberg (147 m), Mecklenburgische Seenplatte District, southwest of Feldberg
12. Hohe Burg (144 m), Rostock District, Hohe Burg and Schwarzer See nature reserve, Rugberg
13. Hirschberg (143.5 m), Mecklenburgische Seenplatte District, Müritz National Park
14. Reiherberg (143 m), Mecklenburgische Seenplatte District, Feldberger Seenlandschaft
15. Luderberg?, unnamed hill not far from Klepelshagen (133.2 m), highest point in Vorpommern-Greifswald District, Brohm Hills
16. Brohmer Berg (131 m), Mecklenburgische Seenplatte District, Brohm Hills
17. Diedrichshagener Berg (129.7 m), highest point in Rostock District, Kühlung
18. Scharfer Berg (129 m), Mecklenburgische Seenplatte District, not far from Woldegk
19. Schmooksberg (127 m), Rostock District, between Teterow and Laage
20. Wulfsberg (127 m), Ludwigslust-Parchim District, Ruhn Hills
21. Langer Berg (124 m), Ludwigslust-Parchim District, southwest of Parchim
22. Serrahn Hills (124.2 m), Mecklenburgische Seenplatte District, Müritz National Park
23. Schlanker Berg (123.7 m), Mecklenburgische Seenplatte District, Mecklenburg Switzerland
24. Hardtberg (123 m), Rostock District, Mecklenburg Switzerland
25. Klebensberg (122 m), Ludwigslust-Parchim District, Ruhn Hills
26. Buchberg (118 m), Ludwigslust-Parchim District, southwest of the Plauer See (gives its name to the new municipality of Buchberg)
27. Lünenberg (118 m), highest point in Nordwestmecklenburg District, parish of Passee
28. Königsstuhl (117.9 m), Vorpommern-Rügen District, Jasmund National Park, Jasmund, Rügen
29. Strelitzer Berg (116.6 m), Mecklenburgische Seenplatte District, Müritz National Park
30. Ostberg (115 m), Rostock District, Mecklenburg Switzerland
31. Ziegler Berg (113.1 m), Vorpommern-Greifswald District, Brohm Hills
32. Heideberg (112.9 m), Nordwestmecklenburg District, east of Grevesmühlen
33. Kalkberg (112 m), Rostock District, Kühlung
34. Mohrberg (111 m), Mecklenburgische Seenplatte District, Mecklenburgische Seenplatte
35. Unnamed hill near Altenhagen (110.3 m), Mecklenburgische Seenplatte District
36. Großer Jägerberg (110 m), Rostock District, Kühlung
37. Krähenberg (110 m), Rostock District, Carinerland municipality
38. Zimmerberg (110 m), Rostock District, Kühlung
39. Tempelberg (107 m), Vorpommern-Rügen District, Southeast Rügen Bosphere Reserve, Granitz, Rügen
40. Tabaksberg (106 m), Rostock District, Mecklenburg Switzerland
41. Rotemoorberg (105.1 m), Mecklenburgische Seenplatte District, near Wesenberg
42. Fuchsberg (104 m), Nordwestmecklenburg District (gives its name to the Fuchsberg Motorway Services)
43. Granziner Heidberge (102.8 m), near Greven, Ludwigslust-Parchim District
44. Primerberg (102 m), Rostock District, Mecklenburg Switzerland
45. Galgenberg (101 m), Mecklenburgische Seenplatte District, Müritz National Park
46. Käflingsberg (100.2 m), Mecklenburgische Seenplatte District, Müritz National Park
47. Iserberg (100 m), Nordwestmecklenburg District, east of Grevesmühlen
48. Jägerberg (100 m), Rostock District, Kühlung
49. Röthelberg (98 m), Rostock District, Mecklenburg Switzerland
50. Hütterberg (95.7 m), Nordwestmecklenburg District
51. Hellberg (93 m), Nordwestmecklenburg District, near Roggendorf
52. Rugard (90 m), Vorpommern-Rügen District, near Bergen on Rügen, Jasmund, Rügen
53. Weinberg (86.1 m), Neumühle, highest point in the borough of Schwerin
54. Schlossberg (86 m), Rostock District, Kühlung
55. Höchster Berg (84.2 m), Rostock District
56. Budenberg (83 m), Rostock District, Kühlung
57. Franzosenberg (82 m), Rostock District, Kühlung
58. Fuchsberg (76.5 m), Klein Rogahn, Ludwigslust-Parchim District
59. Unnamed hill (72.8 m), in the Göhrener Tannen, Schwerin
60. Schluckswiekberg (72.5 m), Vorpommern-Rügen District, Dornbusch, highest hill on the island of Hiddensee
61. Steinberg (71 m), Ludwigslust-Parchim District, highest hill in the Wanzeberg
62. Dolger Berg (71 m), Prisannewitz, Rostock District
63. Golm (69 m), highest hill on island of Usedom, Vorpommern-Greifswald District, near Kamminke and Garz
64. Schever Barg (69 m), Rostock District, near Groß Grabow
65. Freundschaftshöhe (66 m), Rostock District, near Rostock in Rostock Switzerland
66. Streckelsberg (58 m), Vorpommern-Greifswald District, Usedom Island, near Koserow
67. Langer Berg (55 m), Vorpommern-Rügen District, parish of Marlow-Gresenhorst
68. Hellberg (54.0 m), parish of Sarnow, Vorpommern-Greifswald District
69. Wahrenskenberg (52.2 m), Mecklenburgische Seenplatte District, parish of Basedow-Gessin
70. Ziesaberg (49 m), Vorpommern-Greifswald District, near Wolgast
