= Tessenow =

- Ortsteil of Ruhner Berge
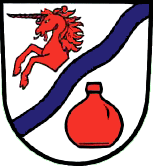
- Coat of arms
- Interactive map of Tessenow
- Location within Germany Location within Mecklenburg-Vorpommern
- Coordinates: 53°21′N 11°54′E
- Country: Germany
- State: Mecklenburg-Vorpommern
- District: Ludwigslust-Parchim
- Municipality: Ruhner Berge
- Subdivisions: 6

Area
  - Total: 35.99 km^{2} (13.90 sq mi)
- Elevation: 80 m (260 ft)

Population (2017-12-31)
  - Total: 584
  - Density: 16.2/km^{2} (42.0/sq mi)
- Time zone: UTC+01:00 (CET)
  - Summer (DST): UTC+02:00 (CEST)
- Postal codes: 19376
- Dialling codes: 038729
- Vehicle registration: PCH
- Website: Amt Eldenburg Lübz

Tessenow (German pronunciation: [ˈtɛsənoː]) is a village and a former municipality in the Ludwigslust-Parchim district, in Mecklenburg-Vorpommern, Germany. Since January 2019, it is part of the new municipality Ruhner Berge.
