= Piekberg =

Mountain in Mecklenburg-Vorpommern, Germany

- Location within Mecklenburg-Vorpommern

Highest point
- Elevation: 160.9 m above sea level (HN) (528 ft)
- Prominence: 161.1 m (529 ft)
- Listing: Highest point on the island of Rügen
- Coordinates: 54°33′09″N 13°37′31″E

Geography
- Location: Rügen, Mecklenburg-Vorpommern, Germany

At 160.9 m above sea level (HN), the Piekberg is the highest point on the island of Rügen and in the region of West Pomerania. It is also the fifth highest point in the German state of Mecklenburg-Vorpommern. It barely rises above the surrounding area, though, as the height difference is very low. The hill is located in a wooded area in the northwestern part of the Jasmund Peninsula, about 2 kilometres southwest of the Stubbenkammer in the Jasmund National Park and about 3 kilometres northeast of the town of Sassnitz. The state road (Landstraße) from Lohme to Sassnitz runs past the Piekberg to the east.

== See also ==
- List of hills of Mecklenburg-Vorpommern
