= Friedrich Gustav Carl Ulrich Franz von Schnehen =

Friedrich Gustav Carl Ulrich Franz von Schnehen (Berlin, 10 November 1808 – Schloss Klützkow, 26 August 1893), Lord of Klützkow, Bahnitz and Wendenberg, was a German politician and nobleman.

== Career ==
He was a Counsellor of the Prussian Government and a Knight of the Order of St. John.

== Marriage and children ==
He married in Magdeburg on 10 December 1842 Johanna Elisabeth Rosalie von Pieschel (20 September 1823 – 14 April 1902, and had issue, among whom a daughter Rosalie Augusta Carolina Johanna Ulrika von Schnehen (Altenplatow, 26 September 1843 – Nemischhof, 22 November 1907), married in Klützow on 13 September 1867 as his second wife with Georg Abraham Constantin von Arnim.
