= Betzin =

- Municipality of Fehrbellin
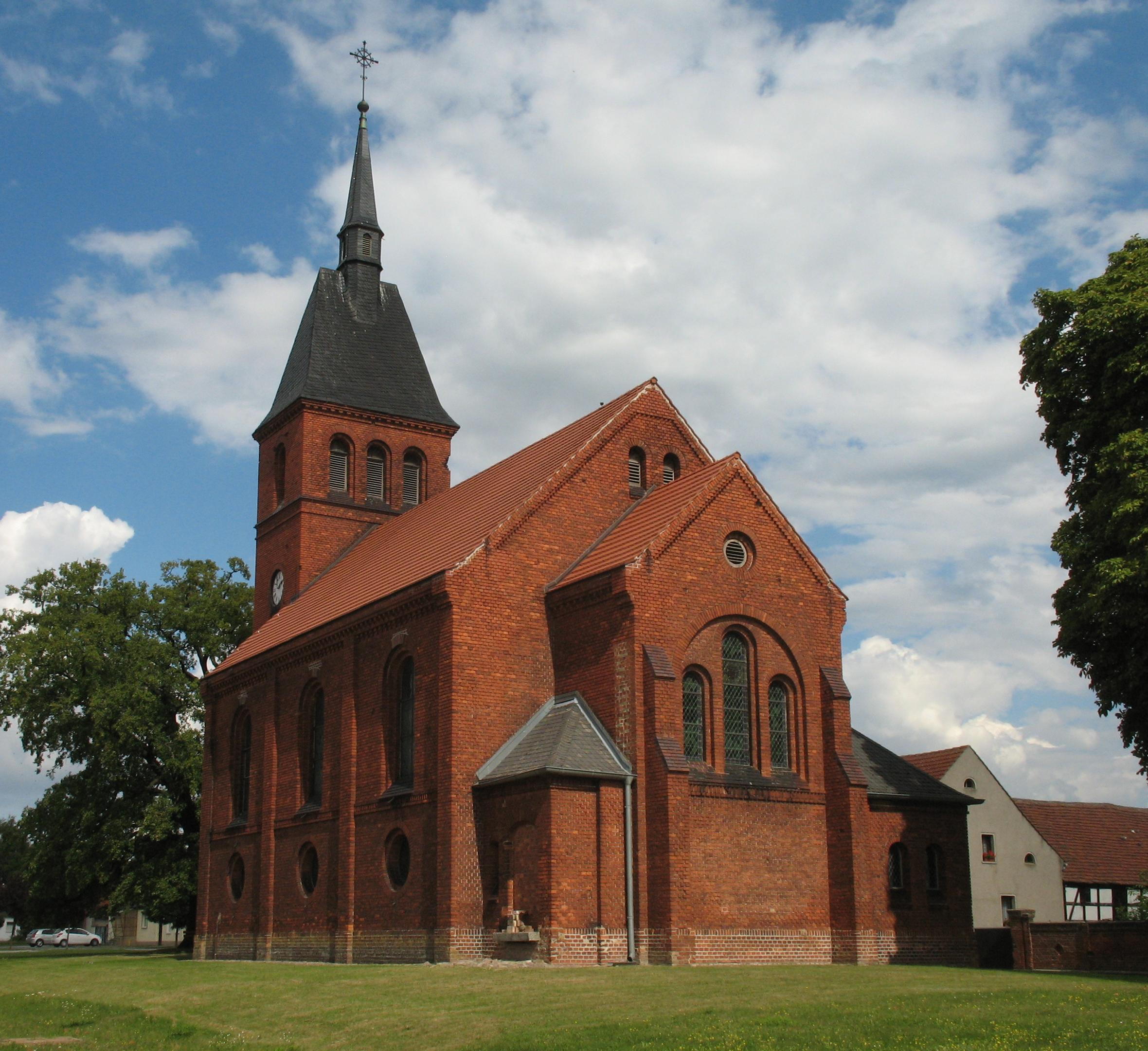
- Betzin church
- Interactive map of Betzin
- Country: Germany
- State: Brandenburg
- District: Ostprignitz-Ruppin

Population
  - Total: 119
- Time zone: UTC+1 (CET)
- Postal code: 16833
- Phone prefix: 033922

Betzin is a district of the municipality Fehrbellin in the Ostprignitz-Ruppin administrative district of Brandenburg, Germany.

== History ==
Betzin was incorporated into Fehrbellin on October 26, 2003.

== Population ==
| Year | Population |
|---|---|
| 1875 | 367 |
| 1890 | 352 |
| 1910 | 307 |
| 1925 | 277 |
| 1933 | 252 |
| 1939 | 256 |
| 1946 | 405 |

| Year | Population |
|---|---|
| 1950 | 378 |
| 1964 | 243 |
| 1971 | 206 |
| 1981 | 170 |
| 1985 | 163 |
| 1989 | 122 |
| 1990 | 118 |

| Year | Population |
|---|---|
| 1991 | 108 |
| 1992 | 106 |
| 1993 | 106 |
| 1994 | 105 |
| 1995 | 115 |
| 1996 | 109 |
| 1997 | 108 |

| Year | Population |
|---|---|
| 1998 | 113 |
| 1999 | 116 |
| 2000 | 125 |
| 2001 | 120 |
| 2002 | 127 |
