= Marnitz =

- Ortsteil of Ruhner Berge
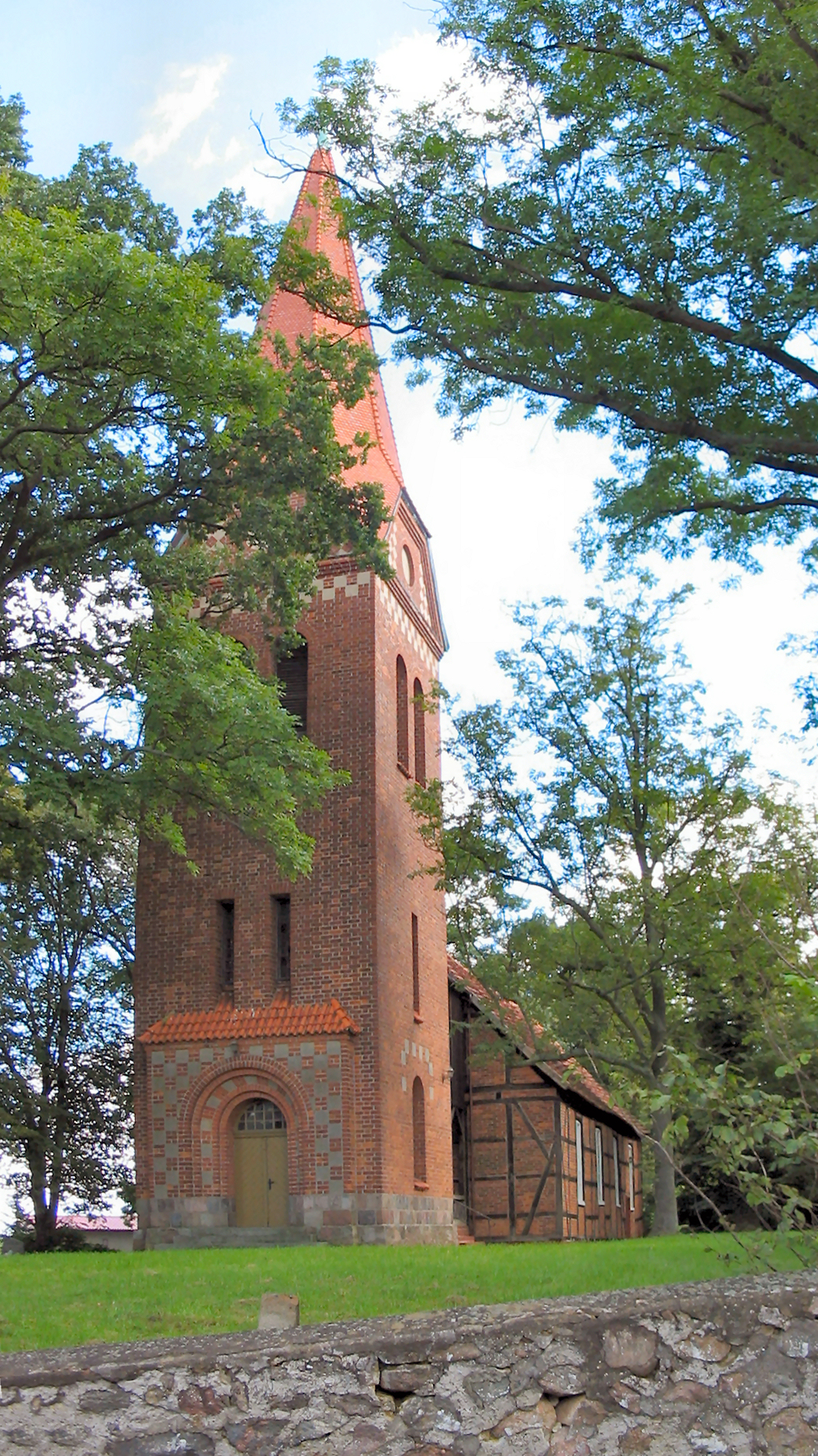
- Church

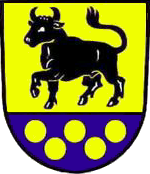
- Coat of arms
- Interactive map of Marnitz
- Location within Germany Location within Mecklenburg-Vorpommern
- Coordinates: 53°19′N 11°56′E
- Country: Germany
- State: Mecklenburg-Vorpommern
- District: Ludwigslust-Parchim
- Municipality: Ruhner Berge
- Subdivisions: 4

Area
  - Total: 31.28 km^{2} (12.08 sq mi)
- Elevation: 85 m (279 ft)

Population (2017-12-31)
  - Total: 767
  - Density: 24.5/km^{2} (63.5/sq mi)
- Time zone: UTC+01:00 (CET)
  - Summer (DST): UTC+02:00 (CEST)
- Postal codes: 19376
- Dialling codes: 038729
- Vehicle registration: PCH
- Website: www.amt-eldenburg-luebz.de

Marnitz (German pronunciation: [ˈmaʁnɪts]) is a village and a former municipality in the Ludwigslust-Parchim district, in Mecklenburg-Vorpommern, Germany. Since January 2019, it is part of the new municipality Ruhner Berge.

Hermann Prieß was born there in 1901.

== Climate ==
Climate data for Marnitz (1991–2020 normals)
Month	Jan	Feb	Mar	Apr	May	Jun	Jul	Aug	Sep	Oct	Nov	Dec	Year
Mean daily maximum °C (°F)	3.0 (37.4)	4.5 (40.1)	8.2 (46.8)	14.3 (57.7)	18.8 (65.8)	21.8 (71.2)	23.9 (75.0)	23.8 (74.8)	19.1 (66.4)	13.4 (56.1)	7.5 (45.5)	3.9 (39.0)	13.6 (56.5)
Daily mean °C (°F)	0.9 (33.6)	1.6 (34.9)	4.2 (39.6)	8.9 (48.0)	13.2 (55.8)	16.3 (61.3)	18.4 (65.1)	18.1 (64.6)	14.0 (57.2)	9.4 (48.9)	4.9 (40.8)	2.0 (35.6)	9.3 (48.7)
Mean daily minimum °C (°F)	−1.6 (29.1)	−1.2 (29.8)	0.4 (32.7)	3.5 (38.3)	7.2 (45.0)	10.6 (51.1)	12.9 (55.2)	12.9 (55.2)	9.6 (49.3)	6.0 (42.8)	2.5 (36.5)	−0.3 (31.5)	5.2 (41.4)
Average precipitation mm (inches)	59.5 (2.34)	46.7 (1.84)	47.6 (1.87)	35.8 (1.41)	50.9 (2.00)	60.3 (2.37)	72.0 (2.83)	61.3 (2.41)	51.0 (2.01)	55.3 (2.18)	47.8 (1.88)	56.6 (2.23)	646.3 (25.44)
Average precipitation days (≥ 1.0 mm)	17.7	15.4	15.1	12.4	13.9	13.9	15.4	14.0	12.9	15.1	15.8	18.1	179.4
Average snowy days (≥ 1.0 cm)	8.4	8.4	4.0	0.4	0	0	0	0	0	0	1.7	5.8	28.7
Average relative humidity (%)	88.0	84.0	79.1	71.9	71.5	72.3	73.3	74.2	79.8	85.0	89.4	89.3	79.8
Mean monthly sunshine hours	43.2	71.5	122.1	189.1	231.2	228.1	216.9	204.3	167.0	103.2	50.7	35.8	1,661.6
Source: World Meteorological Organization
