= Ruhn Hills =

Terminal moraine ridge

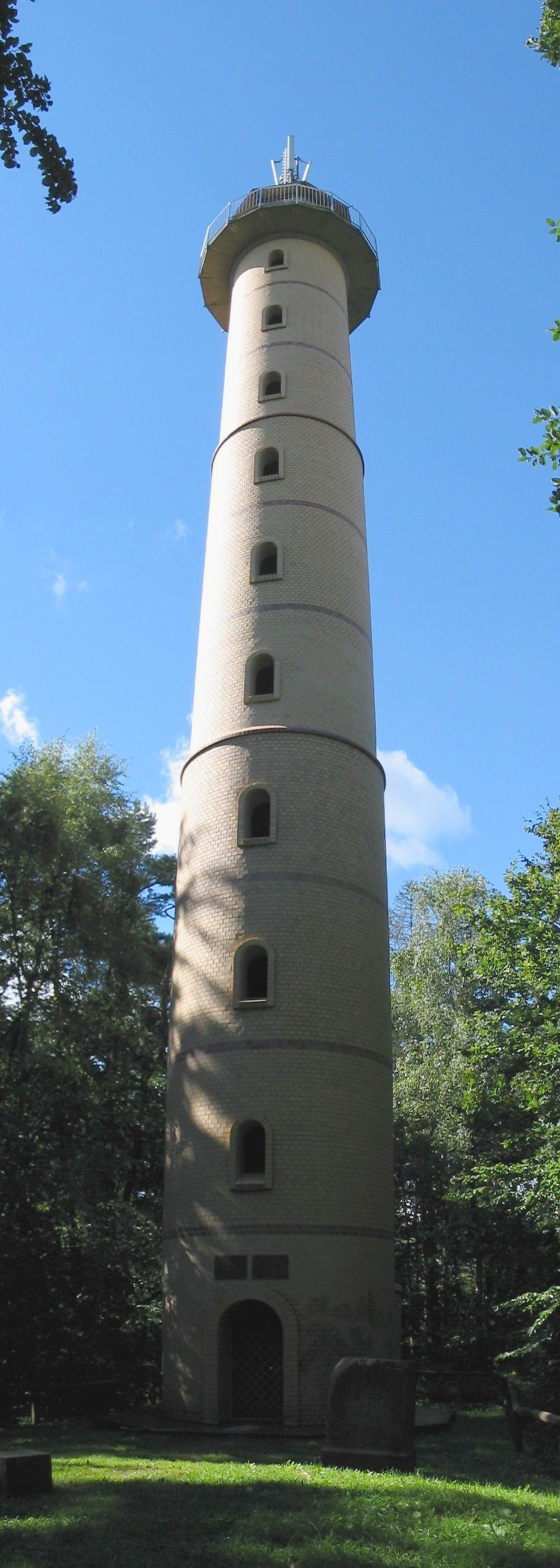
Observation tower (Ruhner Berg)

The Ruhn Hills (German: Ruhner Berge, pronounced [ˈʁuːnɐ ˈbɛʁɡə]) are a terminal moraine ridge up to 176.8 m above sea level (NHN), which lies on either side of the border between the German states of Brandenburg and Mecklenburg-Vorpommern near Parchim. After the Helpt Hills they are the second highest points in the latter federal state.

The hills get their name from the village of Ruhn, which lies northeast of Neu Drefahl. Ruhn is abandoned today, but its foundations and gardens were still recognisable in the 1980s.

== Location ==
The Ruhn Hills are located mainly on the Mecklenburg territory in the district of Ludwigslust-Parchim. Their eastern foothills extend into the district of Prignitz on Brandenburg soil. The ridge lies around 15 kilometres south-southeast of the town of Parchim and runs in a sickle-shape around the main village in the municipality of Marnitz and about 2 kilometres from it.

On the western slopes of the ridge, which is about twelve kilometres long and only a few kilometres wide, rises the Löcknitz, a tributary of the River Elbe. Marnitz is the largest village by the sparsely populated hill chain and lies on the northeastern slopes of the Ruhn Hills. To the north the A 24 motorway bisects the hills. To the east is the parish of Suckow.

== Geology, history and landscape ==
The hill chain of the Ruhner Berge, which was designated a protected area in 1994, was heaped up into a terminal moraine by glacial push during the Pomeranian stage of the Weichselian glaciation; thus it is also referred to as a push moraine. Today it is mostly covered by mixed forest. An educational path illuminates the features of nature. The wooded region of the hills is called the Marnitz Beeches (Marnitzer Buchen).

== Ruhner Berg ==
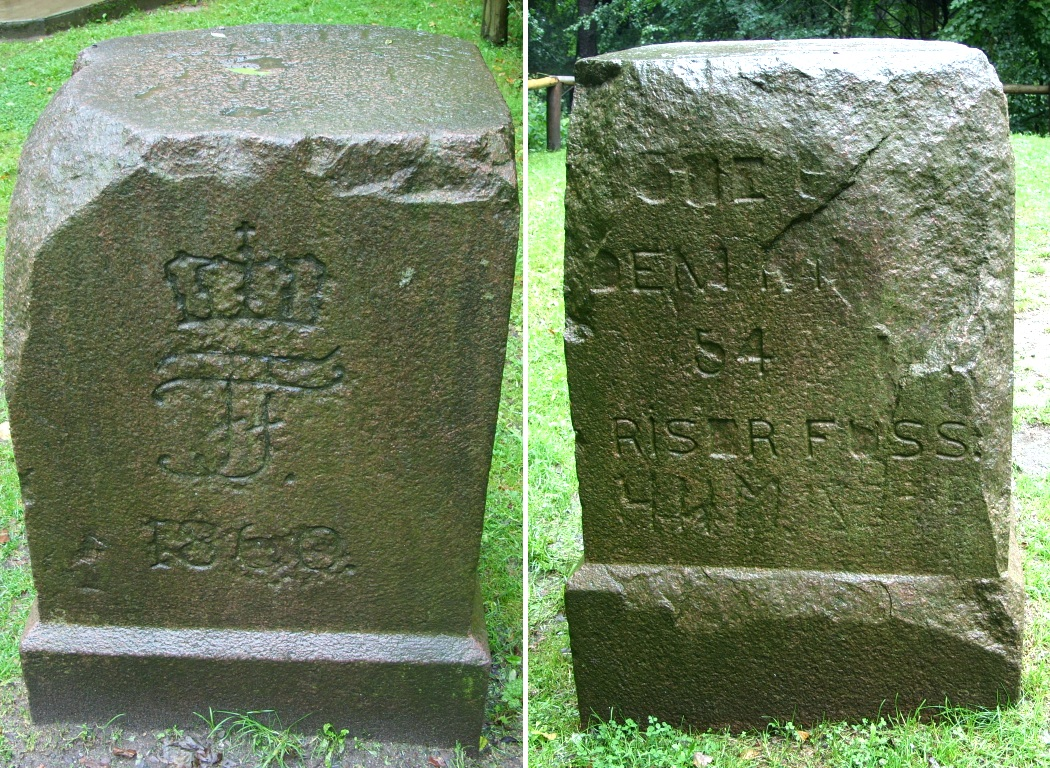
Front and reverse side of the FF Rock (FF-Stein) on the Ruhner Berg

The highest summit on the ridge of the Ruhn Hills, at 176.8 m above NHN, is the similarly named Ruhner Berg ("Ruhn Hill"), which is the second-highest hill in the state of Mecklenburg-Vorpommern and rises clearly above the surrounding area. The summit is accessible via a footpath.

=== FF Rock ===
Next to the official survey stone on the highest point there is also a trig point from the first triangulation survey in Mecklenburg, carried out by Friedrich Paschen. It is called the FF Rock (FF-Stein) by geodesists. The name of this rock comes from the Frederick Francis II, who gave the order for the Grand Duchy of Mecklenburg State Survey (Großherzoglich Mecklenburgische Landvermessung) that took place from 1853 to 1860.

Cyrillic letters have been subsequently inscribed on the rock, for example, on its western face are carved the letters "ГИК" and the year "1945г".

=== Observation tower ===
In June 1907 the Marnitz Veterans' and Military Society (Krieger- und Militärverein Marnitz) proposed the erection of a Moltke Tower. A competition for one did not take place until 1913 however. The project was finally shelved in 1916 due to a lack of materiel and the start of the First World War; and the donations collected were given to a charity for surviving dependents of those killed in the war. Almost 20 years later a similar project was begun in earnest. In 1933 an observation tower was built on the Ruhner Berg. The wooden tower was replaced in 2000-01 by a 32 metre high brick tower. From the observation deck there is a view of the wooded countryside of the Ruhn Hills, and the vista stretches as far as the Mecklenburg Lake District, the Prignitz lowlands and the River Elbe. The tower was funded by EU donations, donations from firms in the region and private individuals as well as the surrounding parishes, whose coats of arms are displayed on metal shields inside the tower. In addition to its touristic function, the tower is also used as a mobile telephone mast.

=== Telecommunication tower ===
Since 1992 there has been a telecommunication tower on the southwest slopes of the Ruhner Berg. It is 91 metres high, made of reinforced concrete and owned by Deutsche Funkturm. (location: 53°17′39″N 11°54′4″E).

== Hills ==
Amongst the summits of the Ruhn Hills are the following:

- Ruhner Berg (176.8 m)
- Dachsberg (169.1 m)
- Reiherberg (161.4 m)
- Priemerberg (152.6 m)
- Buchberg (150.1 m)
- Scharfenberg (135.7 m)
- Krügerberg (128,3 m)
- Taubenberg (126.7 m)
- Schwarzer Berg (125.2 m)
- Horststückenberg (124.5 m)

(Heights above Normalhöhennull)

== Events ==
Every year there is a traditional tower band concert (Turmblasen) on the Ruhner Berg in the 3rd week of Advent.

== Panorama ==
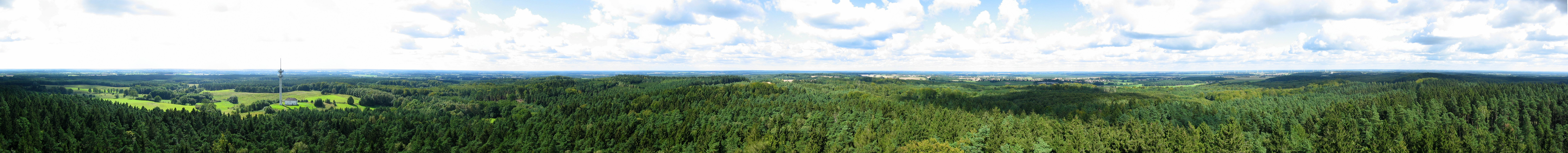
Panoramic view from the observation tower of the Ruhner Berg

== See also ==
- List of hills of Mecklenburg-Vorpommern
