= Rhin =

River in Brandenburg, Germany

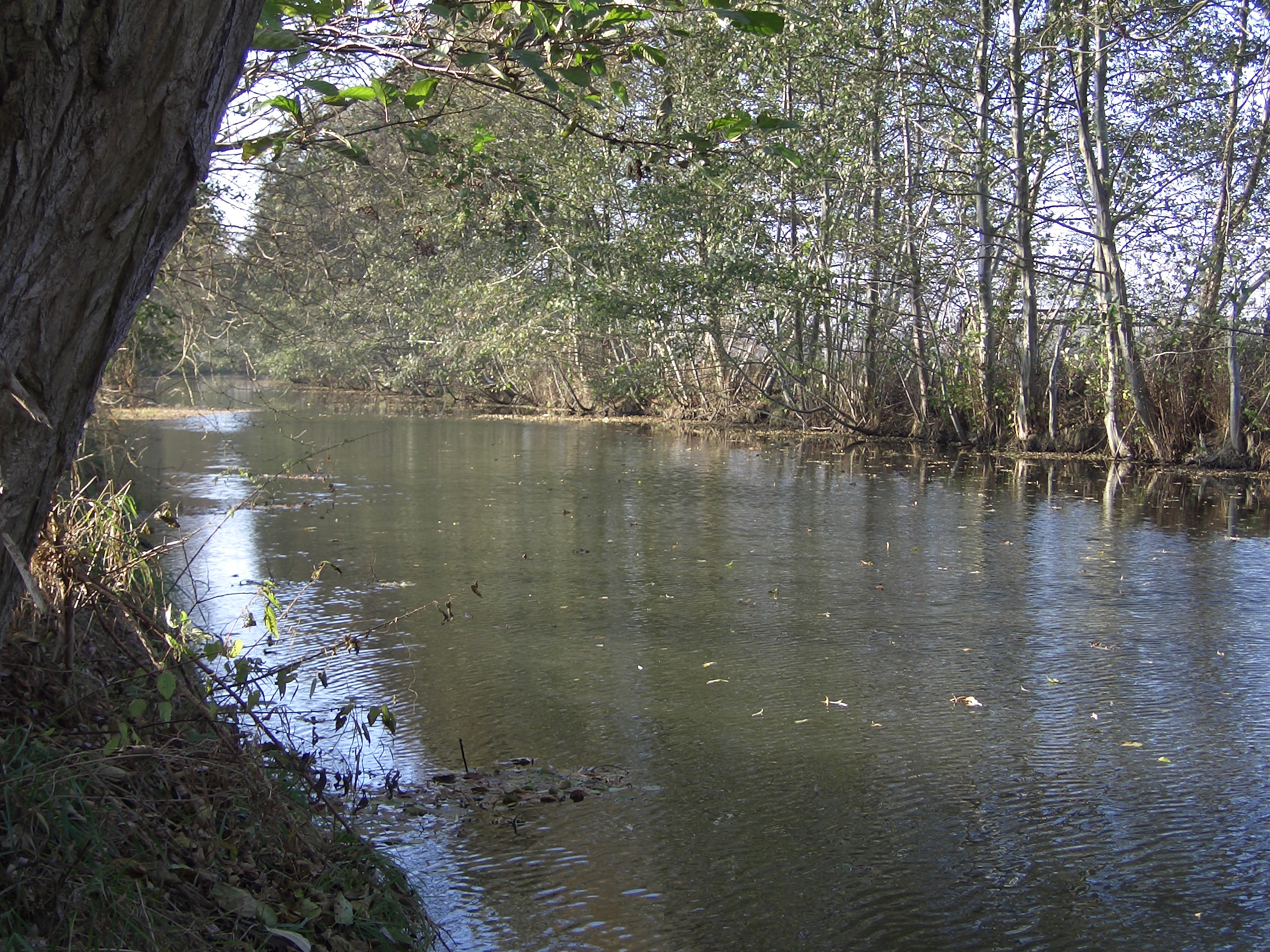
- Near Friesack

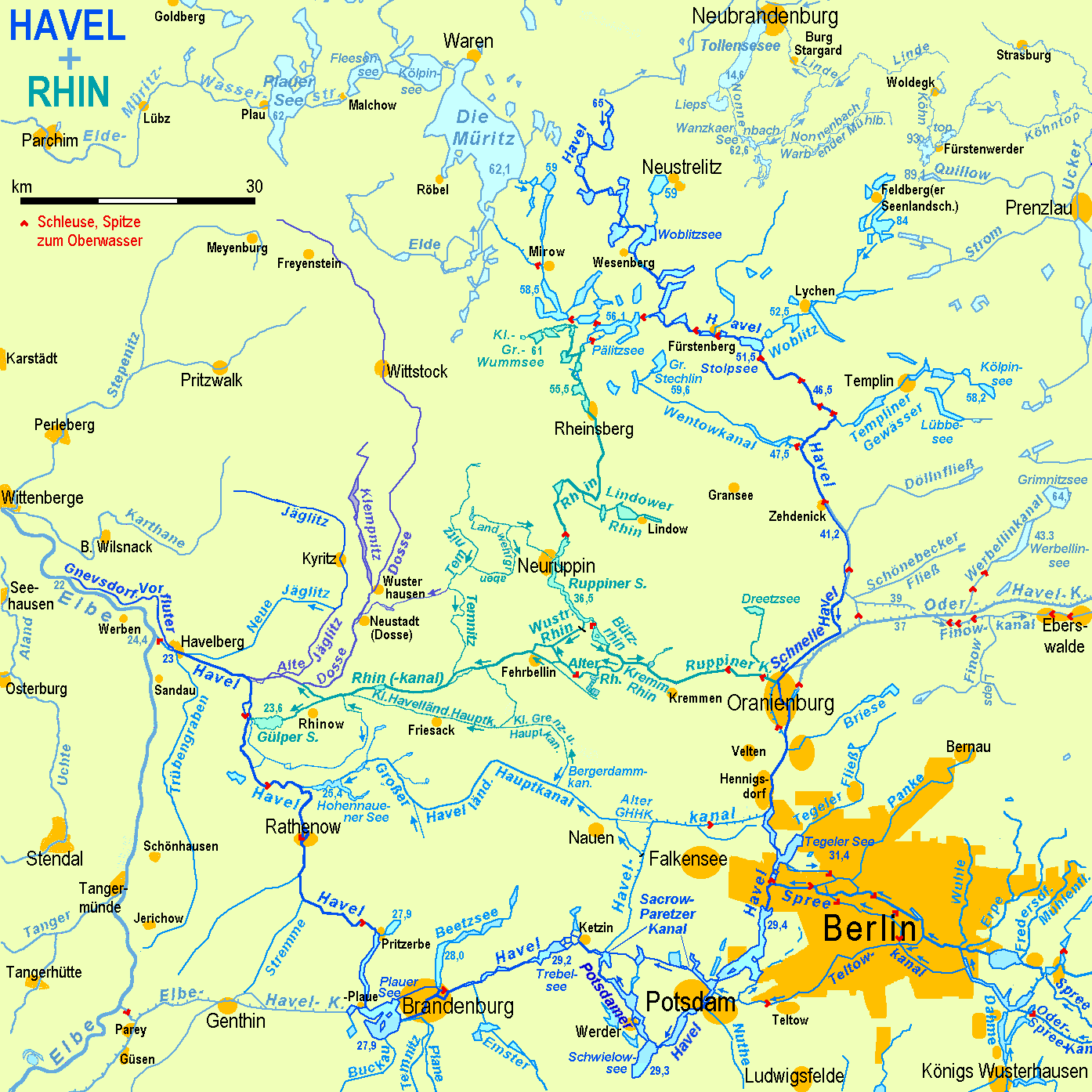
- Havel (dark blue) and Rhin (bluish green)

Location
- Country: Germany

Physical characteristics
- Source
  - location: Brandenburg
- Mouth
  - location: Havel
  - coordinates: 52°44′42″N 12°13′17″E
- Length: 133.3 km (82.8 mi)
- Basin size: 1,780 km^{2} (690 mi^{2})

Basin features
- Progression: Havel→ Elbe→ North Sea

The Rhin is a 133.3-kilometre (82.8 mi) long river in Brandenburg, Germany, right tributary to the river Havel. It flows through the city Neuruppin and several lakes. A few kilometres downstream from Rhinow it flows into the Havel, about 20 kilometres (12 mi) upstream from where the Havel meets the Elbe.

Rhin

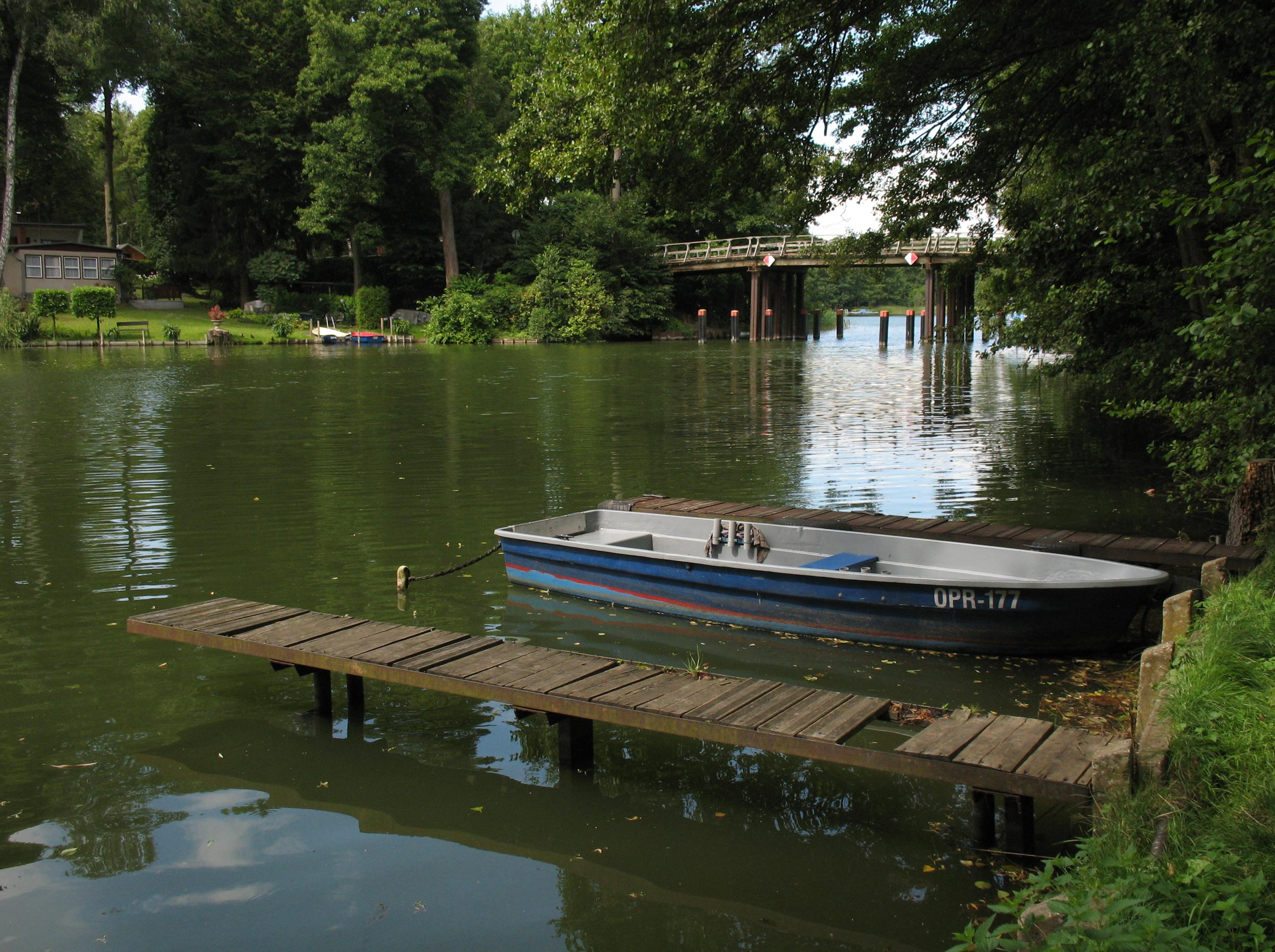
In Neuruppin-Zermützel

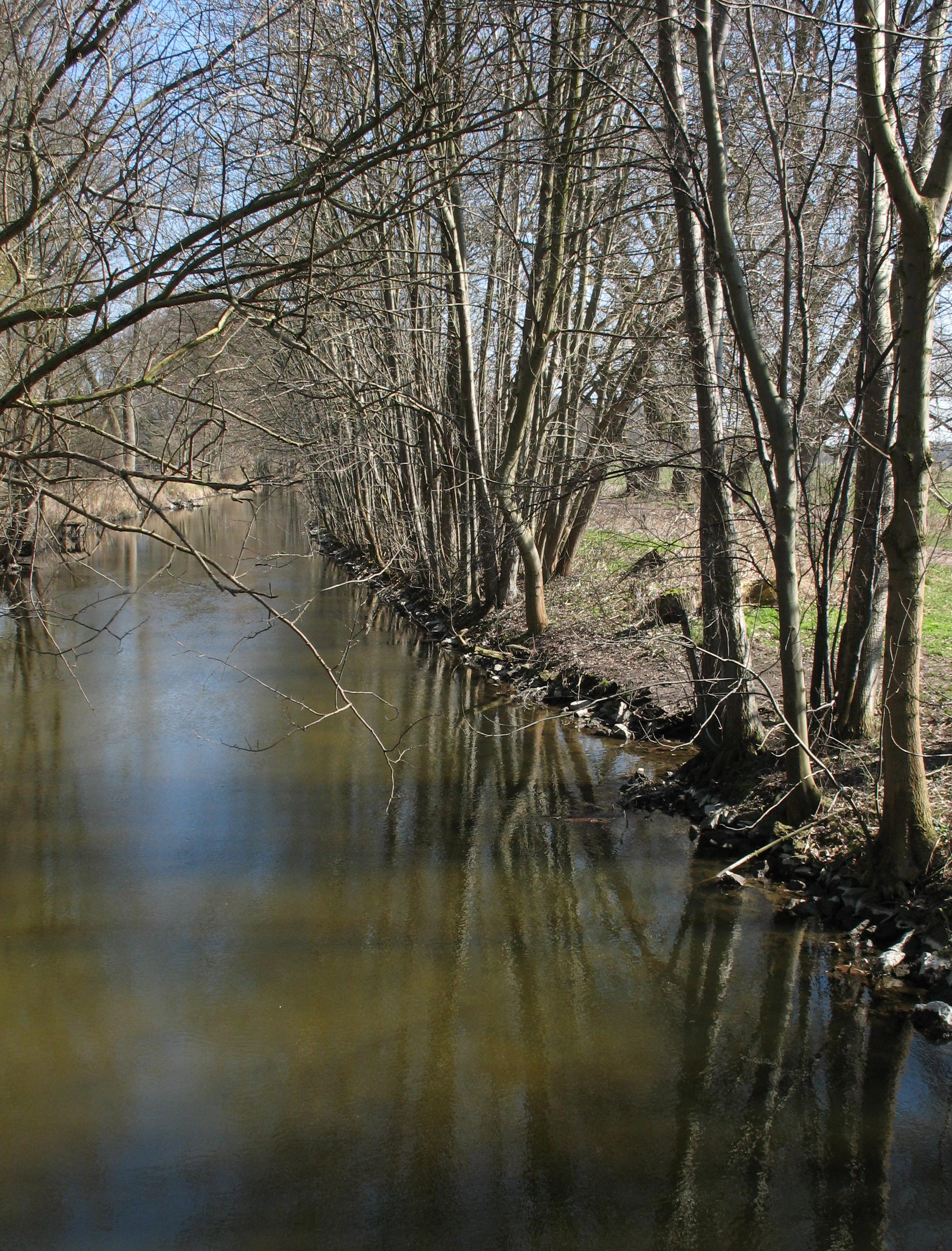
Wustrauer Rhin in Fehrbellin-Wustrau

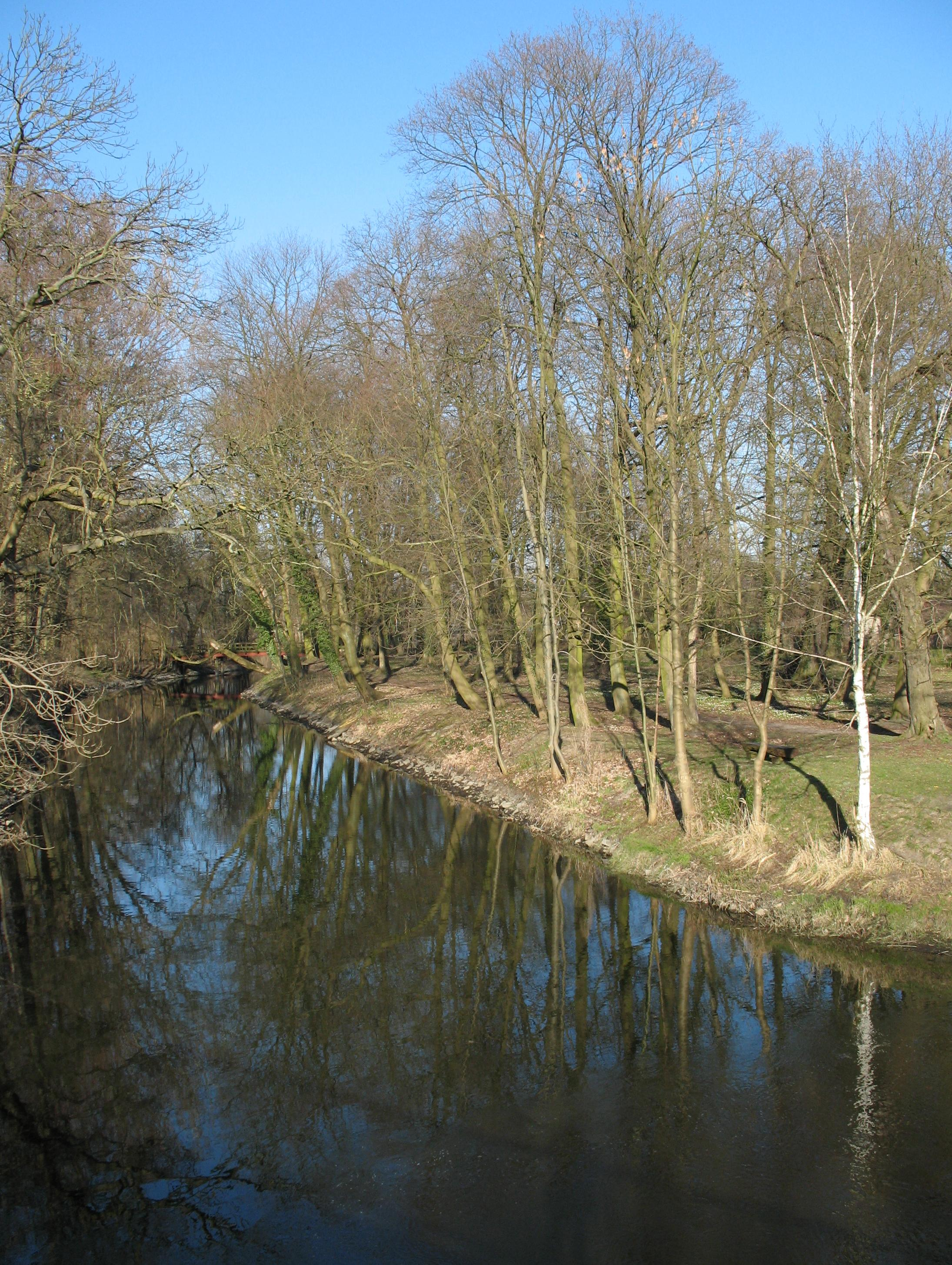
Wustrauer Rhin in Fehrbellin

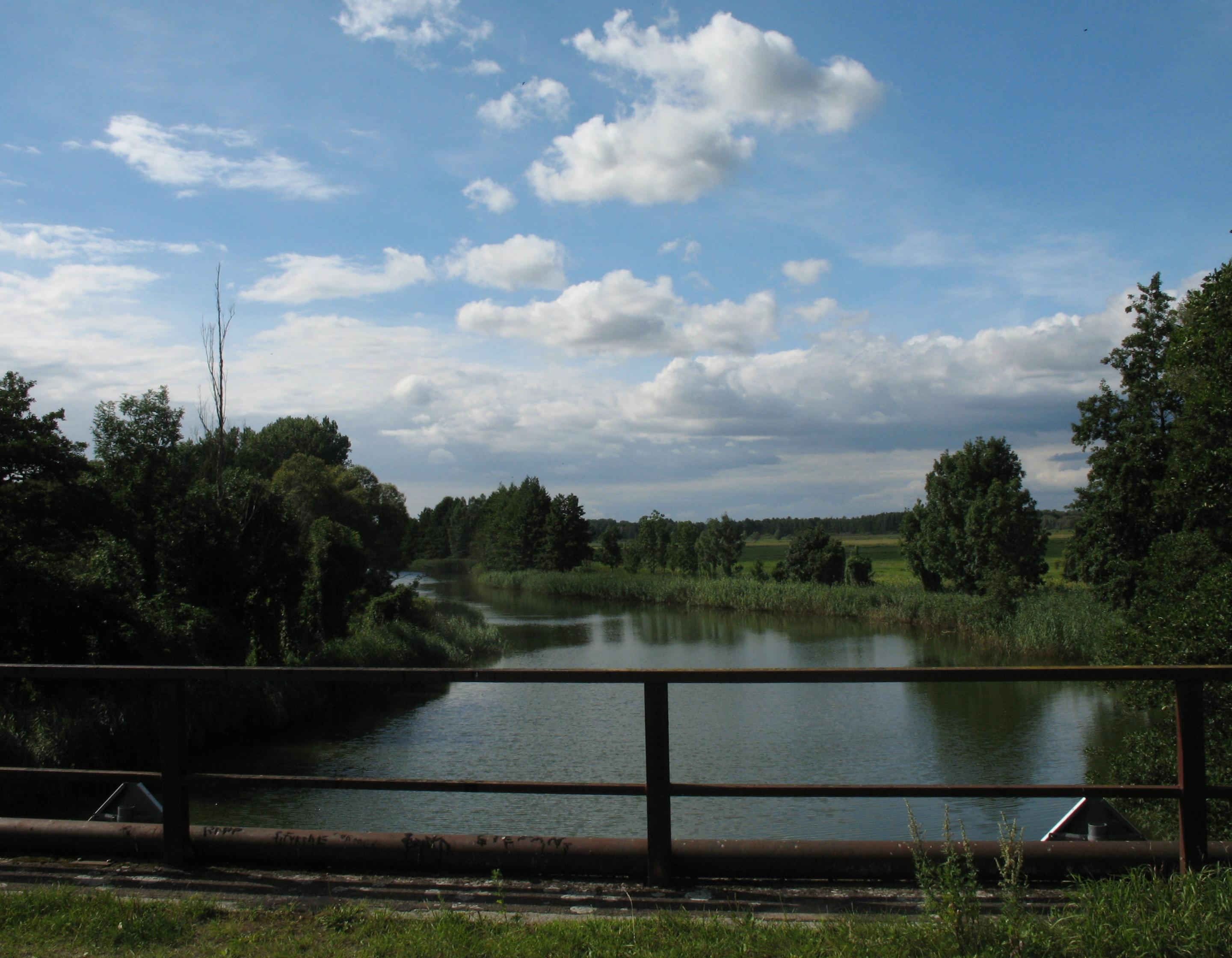
Bützrhin near Fehrbellin-Wall
