= Hubina =

- Municipality
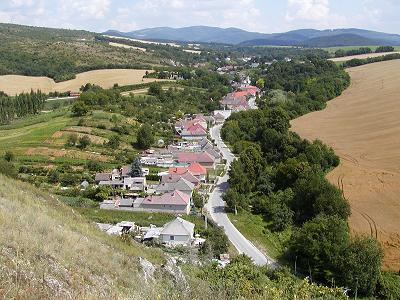

- Flag

- Location of Hubina in the Trnava Region Location of Hubina in Slovakia
- Coordinates: 48.62°N 17.88°E
- Country: Slovakia
- Region: Trnava Region
- District: Piešťany District
- First mentioned: 1353

Area
  - Total: 26.84 km^{2} (10.36 sq mi)
- Elevation: 222 m (728 ft)

Population (2025)
  - Total: 526
- Time zone: UTC+1 (CET)
  - Summer (DST): UTC+2 (CEST)
- Postal code: 922 21
- Area code: +421 33
- Vehicle registration plate (until 2022): PN
- Website: www.hubina.sk

Hubina (Hungarian: Hubafalva) is a village and municipality in Piešťany District in the Trnava Region of western Slovakia.

== History ==
In historical records the village was first mentioned in 1353.

== Geography ==
The municipality lies at an altitude of 222 metres (728 ft) and covers an area of 26.84 km^{2} (10.36 sq mi) (2025).

== Population ==
Population statistic (10 years)
Year	1995	2005	2015	2025
Count	525	489	496	526
Difference		−6.85%	+1.43%	+6.04%

Population statistic
Year	2024	2025
Count	533	526
Difference		−1.31%

It has a population of 526 people (31 December 2025).

=== Ethnicity ===
Census 2021 (1+ %)
Ethnicity	Number	Fraction
Slovak	495	95.37%
Not found out	24	4.62%
Total	519	

In year 2021 was 519 people by ethnicity 495 as Slovak, 24 as Not found out, 5 as Czech, 3 as Polish, 1 as Russian, 1 as Hungarian and 1 as Other.

Note on population: The difference values of population numbers in the table "Population statistic" and in the sections "Ethnicity" & "Religion" is caused by the use of various statistical methods.

=== Religion ===
Census 2021 (1+ %)
Religion	Number	Fraction
Roman Catholic Church	392	75.53%
None	90	17.34%
Not found out	20	3.85%
Evangelical Church	6	1.16%
Total	519	

In year 2021 was 519 people by religion 392 from Roman Catholic Church, 90 from None, 20 from Not found out, 6 from Evangelical Church, 4 from Eastern Orthodox Church, 3 from Jehovah's Witnesses, 3 from Greek Catholic Church and 1 from Christian Congregations in Slovakia.

== Genealogical resources ==
The records for genealogical research are available at the state archive "Statny Archiv in Bratislava, Slovakia"

- Roman Catholic church records (births/marriages/deaths): 1783-1905 (parish B)

== See also ==
- List of municipalities and towns in Slovakia
