= Suckow =

- Ortsteil of Ruhner Berge
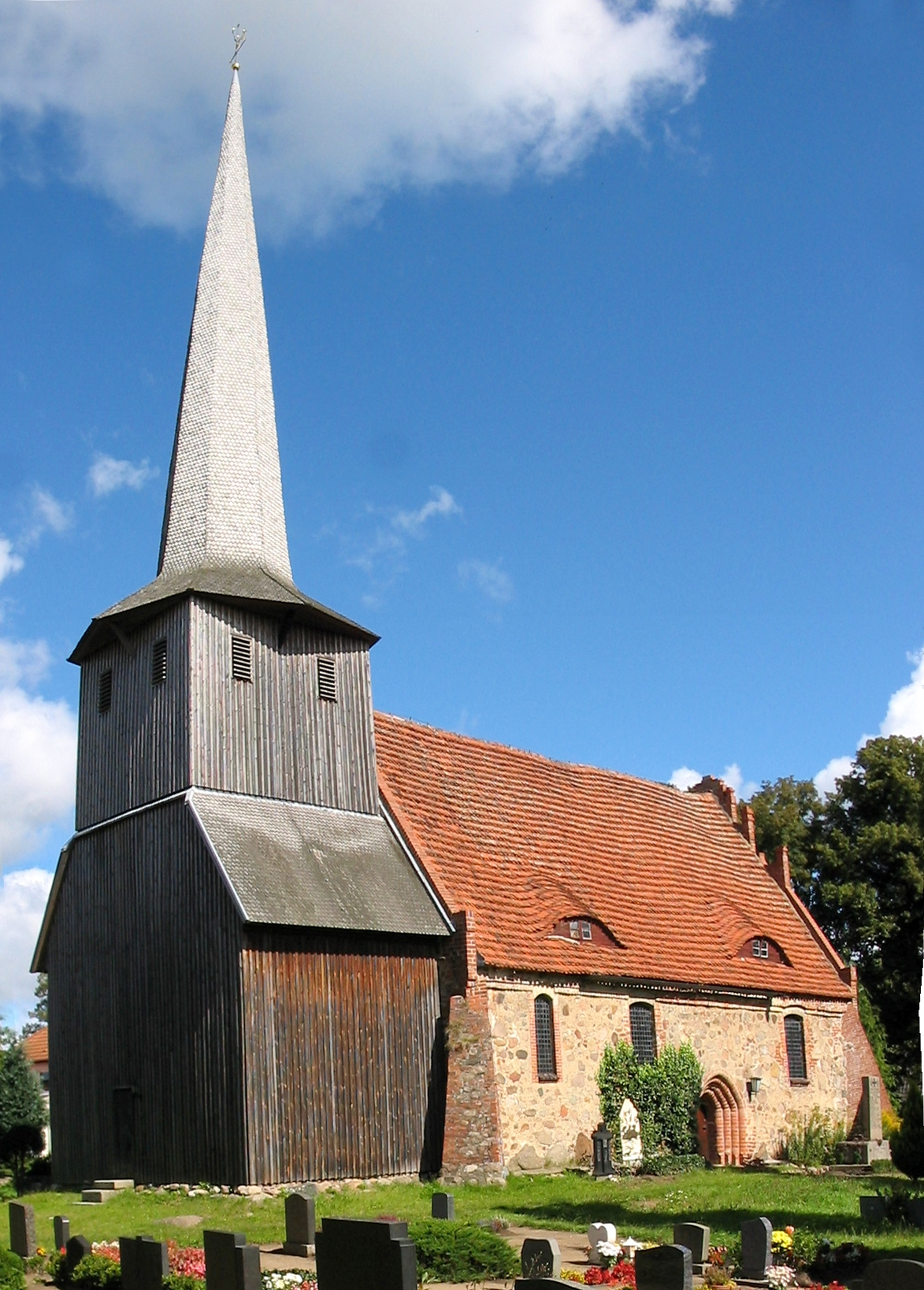
- Church

- Coat of arms
- Interactive map of Suckow
- Location within Germany Location within Mecklenburg-Vorpommern
- Coordinates: 53°19′N 11°58′E
- Country: Germany
- State: Mecklenburg-Vorpommern
- District: Ludwigslust-Parchim
- Municipality: Ruhner Berge
- Subdivisions: 4

Area
  - Total: 27.18 km^{2} (10.49 sq mi)
- Elevation: 75 m (246 ft)

Population (2017-12-31)
  - Total: 499
  - Density: 18.4/km^{2} (47.5/sq mi)
- Time zone: UTC+01:00 (CET)
  - Summer (DST): UTC+02:00 (CEST)
- Postal codes: 19376
- Dialling codes: 038729
- Vehicle registration: PCH
- Website: www.amt-eldenburg-luebz.de

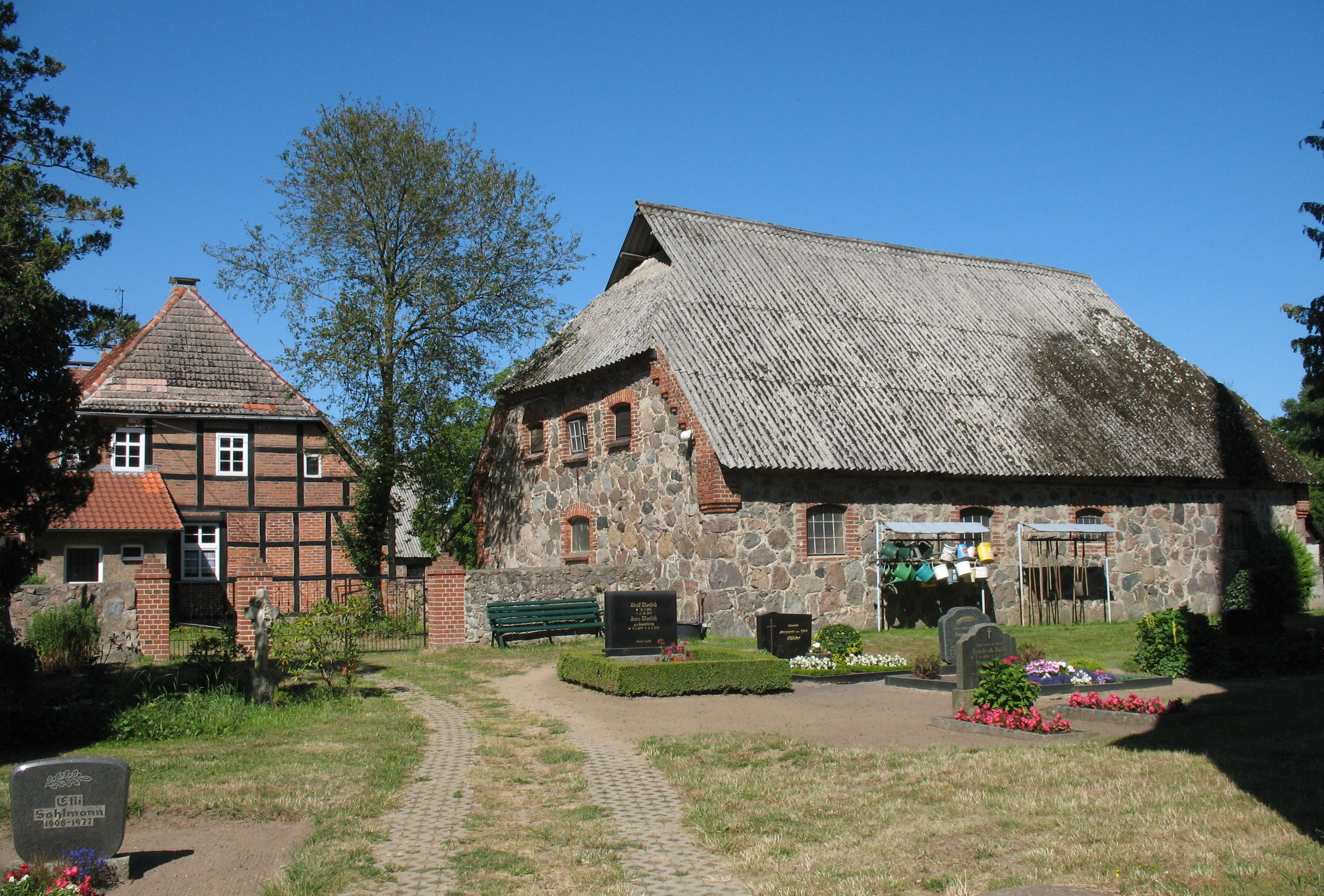
Rectory

Suckow (German pronunciation: [ˈzʊkoː]) is a village and a former municipality in the Ludwigslust-Parchim district, in Mecklenburg-Vorpommern, Germany. Since January 2019, it is part of the new municipality Ruhner Berge.
