= Herzhorn (Amt) =

District of Steinberg, Schleswig-Holstein, Germany

Coordinates: 53.783°N 9.483°E

Herzhorn was an Amt ("collective municipality") in the district of Steinburg, in Schleswig-Holstein, Germany. The seat of the Amt was in Herzhorn. In January 2008, it was merged with the Amt Horst to form the Amt Horst-Herzhorn.

The Amt Herzhorn consisted of the following municipalities:

1. Blomesche Wildnis
2. Borsfleth
3. Engelbrechtsche Wildnis
4. Herzhorn
5. Kollmar
6. Krempdorf
7. Neuendorf bei Elmshorn
