= Holdorf =

Holdorf may refer to:

- Holdorf, Lower Saxony, municipality in the district of Vechta, in Lower Saxony, Germany
- Holdorf, Mecklenburg-Vorpommern, municipality in the Nordwestmecklenburg district, in Mecklenburg-Vorpommern, Germany
- Willi Holdorf (1940–2020), West German athlete
- Dirk Holdorf (born 1966), German football player
