= Krempe Marsh =

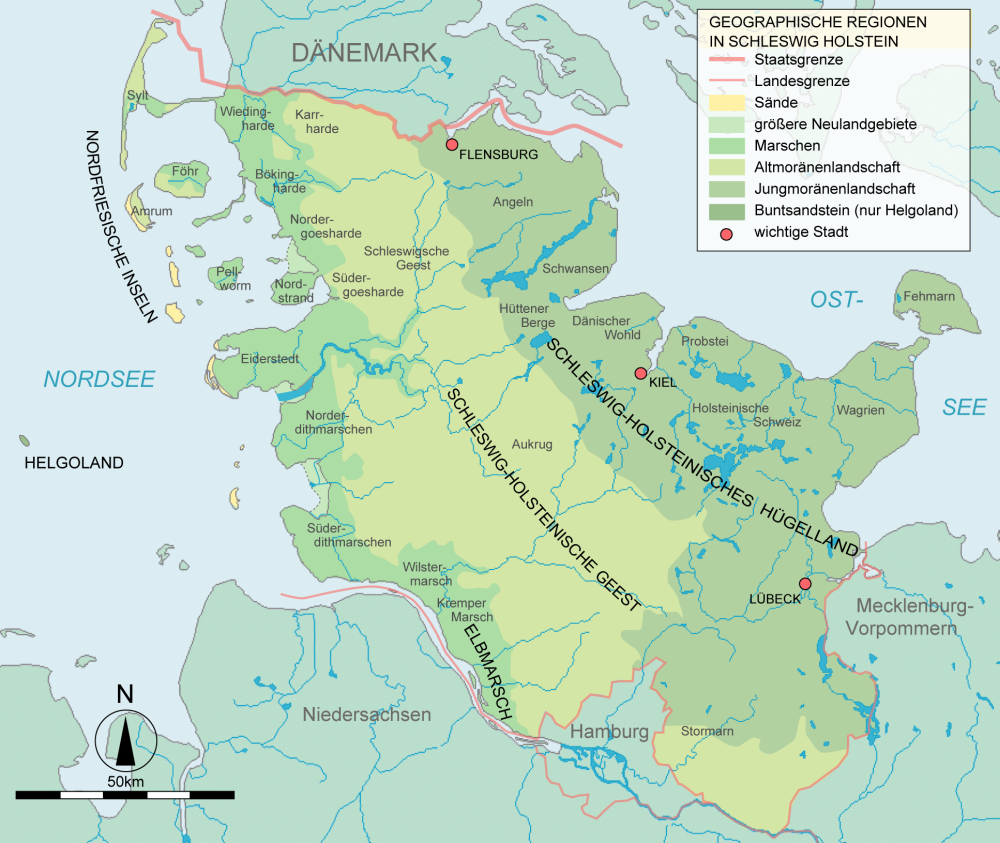
Landscapes in Schleswig-Holstein with the Krempe Marsh as part of the Holstein Elbe marshes

The Krempe Marsh (German: Kremper Marsch or Krempermarsch) is one of the Holstein Elbe marshes and lies northeast of the River Elbe between its tributaries of the Krückau and Stör and the edge of the geest. The main settlement in the Krempe Marsh is the town of Krempe; it is bisected by the Krempau river.

The Krempe Marsh is part of district of Steinburg in Schleswig-Holstein. The opening up of the Krempe Marsh, like that of the Wilster Marsh, was enabled by Dutch settlers in the 12th century. In the south of the Krempe Marsh the Dutch established at that time an almost enclosed region of settlement. The region is even today still overwhelmingly agricultural, the most important branch being the rearing of cattle; in addition the cultivation of rape seed and grain are also important.

The most important town is Glückstadt. Here there is also industry and a ferry link over the Elbe to Wischhafen. South of Glückstadt lies the village of Kollmar.
