= Heide-Itzehoe Geest =

Region of Schleswig-Holstein, Germany

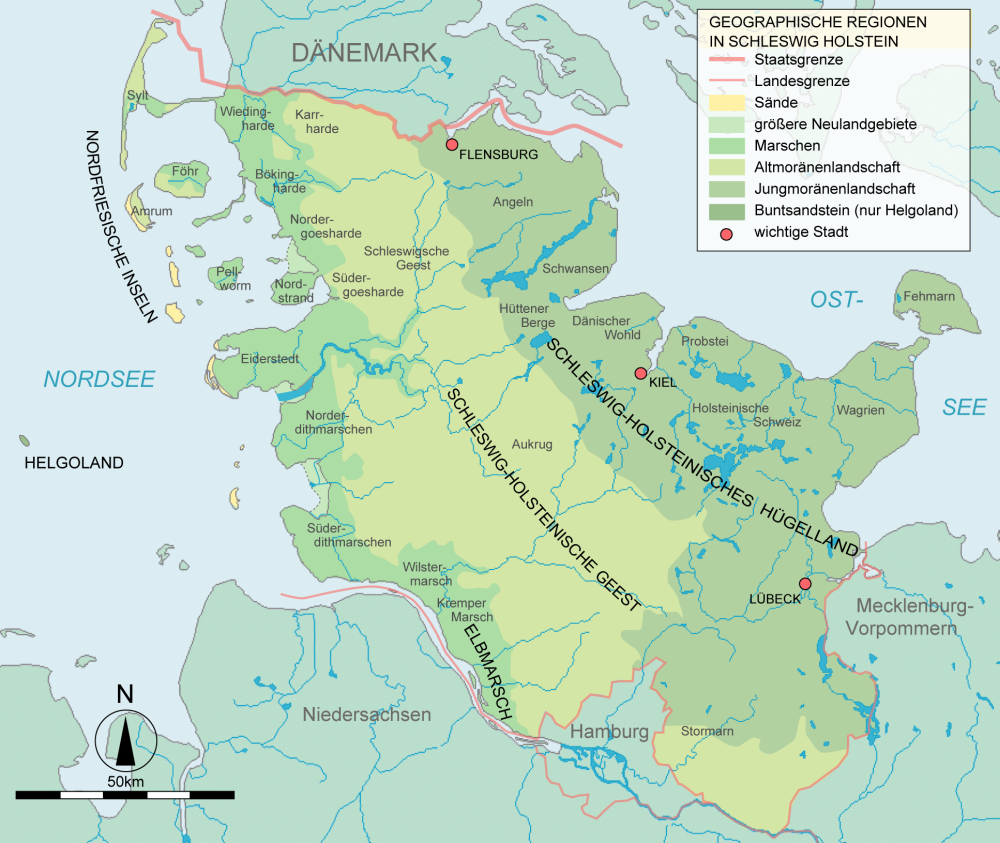
Landscapes in Schleswig-Holstein

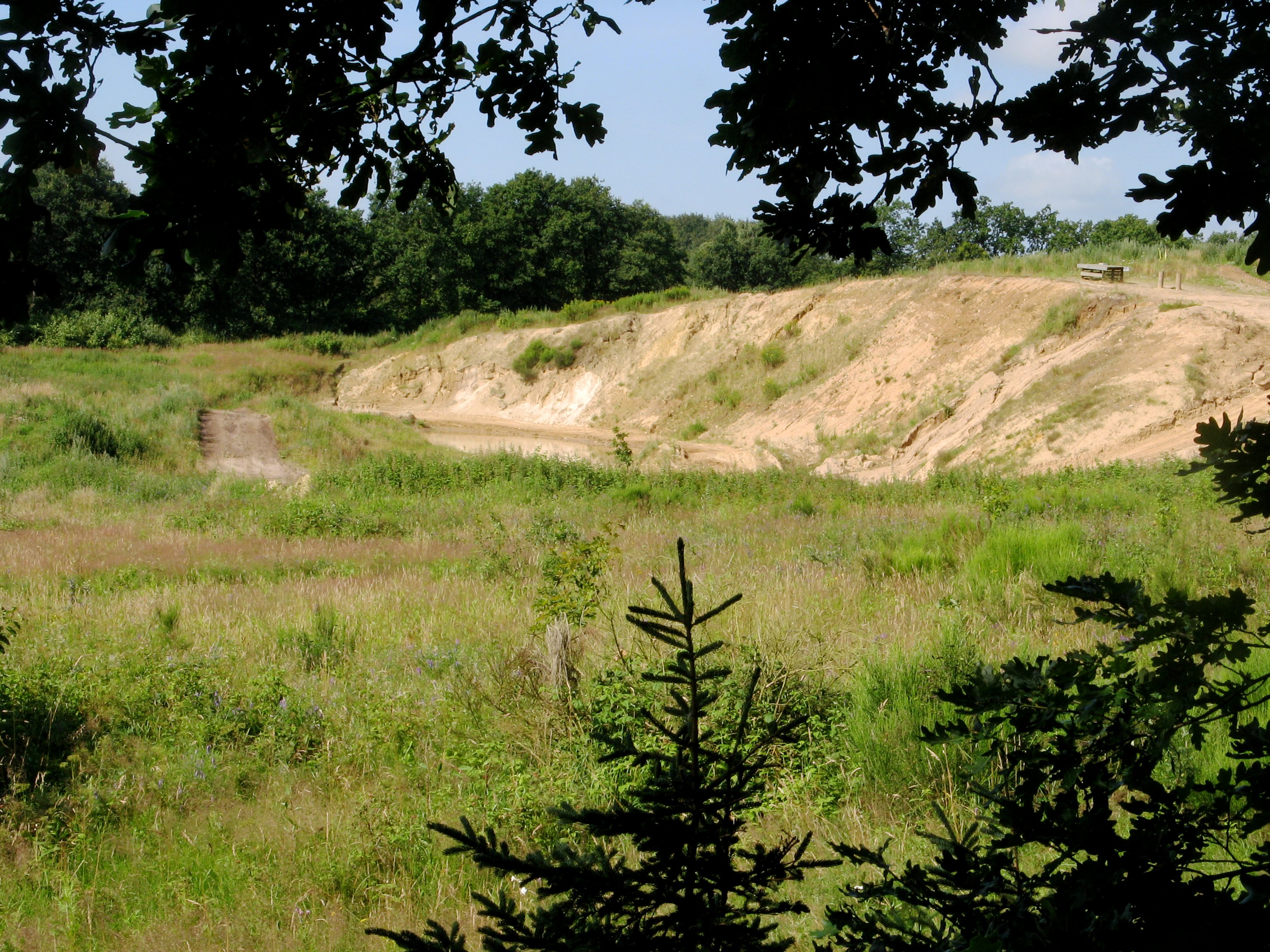
On an end moraine in Dithmarschen Switzerland

The Heide-Itzehoe Geest (German: Heide-Itzehoer Geest) is a division of a larger natural region in the west of the German state of Schleswig-Holstein. It belongs to the Hohe Geest and thus to the Schleswig-Holstein Geest natural region. It covers an area of 1,182 square kilometres.

The Heide-Itzehoe Geest was pushed up during the Saale glaciation and so belongs to the geologically oldest areas in the state. The region lies south of the Eider-Treene Depression, east of the Dithmarsch and Wilster marshes, north of the Elbe marshes and west of the Vorgeest. It is clearly demarcated, particularly in the west, for long stretches along the old coastline, recognisable by its prominent cliffs (Kleve). The southernmost part is the Münsterdorf Geest Island south of the river Stör and north of the Krempe Marsh.

The geest lies mainly in the present-day districts of Dithmarschen and Steinburg. It is bisected by the Kiel Canal which uses a valley between the Dithmarsch Geest in the north and the Hohenwestedt Geest in the south.

For an old moraine landscape the Heide-Itzehoe has relatively large height differences. At just under 80 metres above sea level the highest elevations on the west coast of the state are found on the Heide-Itzehoe Geest. The soils are very unsuitable for agriculture (with an 'arable value' of between 26 and 35 on a scale of 100).
