= Herzhorn =

- Municipality
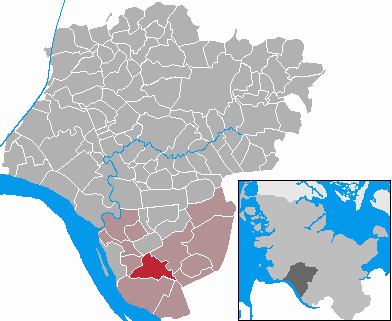
- Location of Herzhorn within Steinburg district
- Interactive map of Herzhorn
- Location within Germany Location within Schleswig-Holstein
- Coordinates: 53°47′26″N 9°29′3″E
- Country: Germany
- State: Schleswig-Holstein
- District: Steinburg
- Municipal assoc.: Horst-Herzhorn

Government
  - Mayor: Wolfgang Glißmann

Area
  - Total: 12.43 km^{2} (4.80 sq mi)
- Elevation: 1 m (3.3 ft)

Population (2025-12-31)
  - Total: 1,115
  - Density: 89.70/km^{2} (232.3/sq mi)
- Time zone: UTC+01:00 (CET)
  - Summer (DST): UTC+02:00 (CEST)
- Postal codes: 25379
- Dialling codes: 04124, 04128
- Vehicle registration: IZ
- Website: www.amt-horst-herzhorn.de

Herzhorn is a municipality in the district of Steinburg, in Schleswig-Holstein, Germany. It is situated near the river Elbe, approx. 4 km east of Glückstadt, and 15 km south of Itzehoe.

Herzhorn was the seat of the former Amt ("collective municipality") Herzhorn.
