= Engelbrechtsche Wildnis =

- Municipality
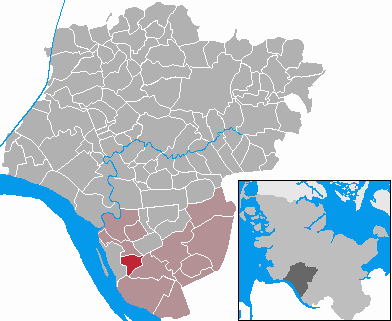
- Location of Engelbrechtsche Wildnis within Steinburg district
- Interactive map of Engelbrechtsche Wildnis
- Location within Germany Location within Schleswig-Holstein
- Coordinates: 53°46′N 9°28′E
- Country: Germany
- State: Schleswig-Holstein
- District: Steinburg
- Municipal assoc.: Horst-Herzhorn
- Subdivisions: 4

Government
  - Mayor: Maren Nagel

Area
  - Total: 5.13 km^{2} (1.98 sq mi)
- Elevation: 0 m (0 ft)

Population (2025-12-31)
  - Total: 841
  - Density: 164/km^{2} (425/sq mi)
- Time zone: UTC+01:00 (CET)
  - Summer (DST): UTC+02:00 (CEST)
- Postal codes: 25348
- Dialling codes: 04124
- Vehicle registration: IZ
- Website: www.amt-horst-herzhorn.de

Engelbrechtsche Wildnis is a municipality in the district of Steinburg, in Schleswig-Holstein, Germany.

== Geography and transport ==
The municipality of Engelbrechtsche Wildnis is located directly east of Glückstadt. The Herzhorner Rhin and the Schwarzwasser river flow through the municipality.

Engelbrechtsche Wildnis is a rural community without a town center and consists of individual farmsteads and settlements including Am Herzhorner Rhin, Grillchaussee, Herrendeich, Obendeich, and Schwarzer Weg.

== History ==
The settlement of the municipality began after the reclamation of the Herzhorner Wildnis in 1615. The area belonged to the Schauenburg Counts from 1350 to 1640, from Adolf VII to Otto V. Since then, it has been in possession of the Danish kings. In 1671, Christian V granted the area to his illegitimate half-brother Ulrich Friedrich Gyldenlöwe. On December 23, 1697, the municipality was separated as a noble estate from the rule of Herzhorn. After Gyldenlöwe's death in 1704, Ferdinand Anthon zu Laurwig was the estate owner until 1754, followed by Christian Conrad von Danneskjold-Laurwigen from 1754 to 1783, Friedrich Ludwig Ernst von Bülow from 1783 to 1861, and finally the eponym Johannes Engelbrecht (1832–1914) from 1861 to 1867. He purchased the Wildnis for 440,000 Danish Rigsbankdaler on June 15, 1860, and also assumed the debts of 216,800 Rigsbankdaler.

In 1889, the estate ownership was abolished by the Prussian state. The municipality became an independent commune, initially self-governing. With the formation of the Herzhorn district on October 1, 1889, the police administration was transferred to the district head. In 1950, the municipality joined the Amt Herzhorn.

On January 1, 1974, a part of the area with around 200 residents was ceded to the city of Glückstadt.

== Municipal council ==
In the municipal election on May 14, 2023, a total of eleven seats were allocated. These seats were once again all won by the Municipal Voter Association Engelbrechtsche Wildnis. The voter turnout was 52.3%.

== Historic buildings ==
Along the Grillchaussee, the brick buildings of the former Naval Hospital Glückstadt, inaugurated in 1942, stand. Since 1978, the Psychiatric Center Glückstadt, a facility of the Vitanas Group based in Berlin (as of 2015), is located there.

Additionally, the municipality has numerous farmhouses, some of which have been expanded with additions or separate residential houses during the founding period. One of the large old farmhouses is located at Herzhorner Rhin 21 and now houses a pub. During a house extension in 1877, the magnificent entrance gable with a female figure above the entrance was created, representing the fertility goddess Flora.
