= Rhin (Elbe) =

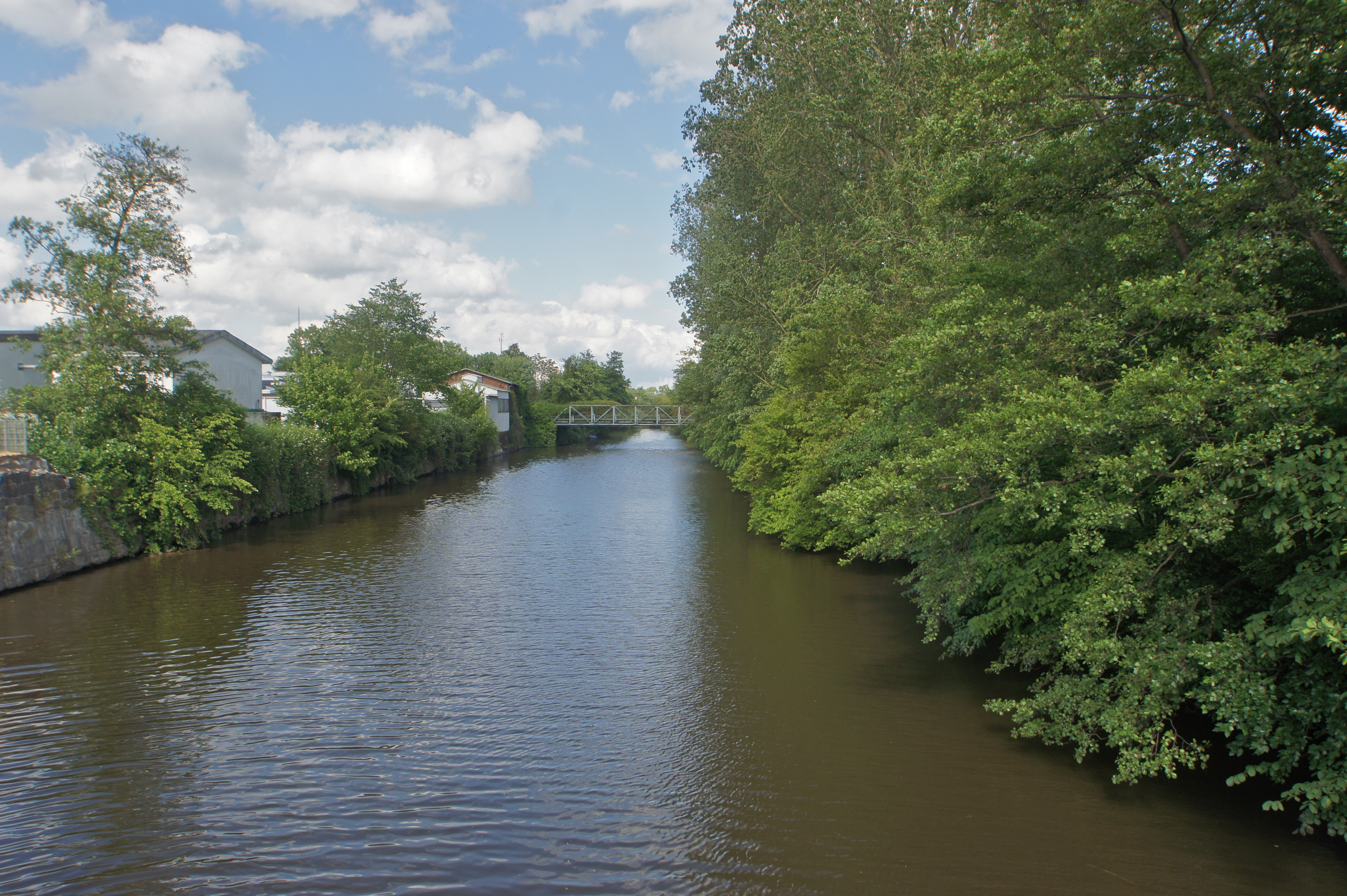
- The Rhin at the Stadstrasse in Glückstadt

Location
- Country: Germany
- States: Schleswig-Holstein

Physical characteristics
- Source
  - coordinates: 53°47′10.57″N 9°25′59″E
- Mouth
  - location: Elbe in Glückstadt
  - coordinates: 53°47′6″N 9°24′51″E

Basin features
- Progression: Elbe→ North Sea
- Tributaries
  - left: Herzhorner Rhin
  - right: Kremper Rhin

The Rhin is a river of Schleswig-Holstein, Germany; a right tributary of the Elbe formed by the confluence of the Herzhorner Rhin and the Kremper Rhin in Glückstadt.

The Rhin drains a large part of the Krempe Marsh, and flows into the Glückstadt outer harbor via two locks (Kleine and Große Rhinschleuse) and a pumping station, ultimately reaching the Elbe. The Rhine and its tributaries drain the marshes and wet meadows to the west of the Krückau and Langenhalsener Wettern basins and to the east of the Stör. Its mouth is located below sea level, resulting in only being able to drain at low tide. Until 1951, its waters were passively discharged through two drainage sluices, which opened automatically when the Elbe level was lower than that of the Rhine. This system proved inadequate, as during heavy rain or storms, when the risk of flooding is higher, the Elbe level did not drop sufficiently in time to discharge a sufficient volume of water. The construction of a pumping station was inaugurated on September 29, 1951. This station protects an area of about 1,000 hectares (2,500 acres) from the risk of high water.

Since the construction of the sluices, the river is no longer subject to tidal movements. It is not navigable for commercial vessels but is popular for canoe trips. In the past, the river was used by flat-bottomed sailboats known as Rhin Ewer or Kohl Ewer, characterized by their colorful paint, which were used to transport products from the surrounding gardens. By 1929, almost all of these sailboats had disappeared.

== Literature ==
- Klaus Bielenberg: Das Entwässerungswesen. Der Rhin. In: Heimatbuch-Kommission (Ed.): Heimatbuch des Kreises Steinburg. Vol. 2, Augustin, Glückstadt 1925, pp. 320–323.

== See also ==
- List of rivers of Schleswig-Holstein
