= Krempau =

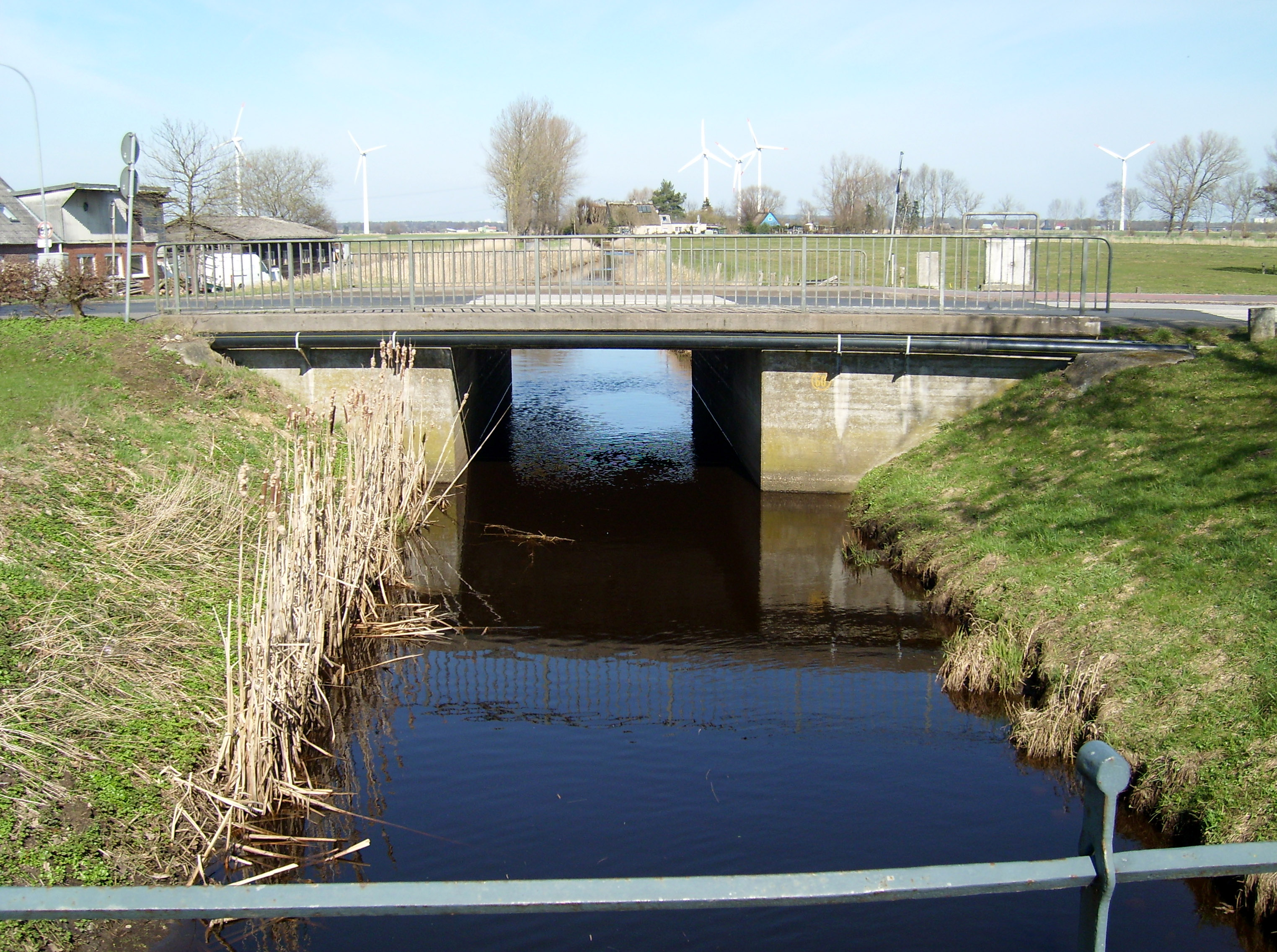

Location
- Country: Germany
- States: Schleswig-Holstein

Physical characteristics
- Mouth
  - location: Stör
  - coordinates: 53°50′09″N 9°26′10″E

Basin features
- Progression: Stör→ Elbe→ North Sea

The Krempau (also Kremper Au) is a tributary of the Stör river which is located in the Barmstedt-Kisdorfer Geest area amid the Kremper Marshes of Schleswig-Holstein, Germany. At around 20 km in length, it joins the Stör from the south in the eastern portion of the parish of Borsfleth with its source in the southern part of the Brande-Hörnerkirchen municipal area. From there, the river flows west under the A23 between Hohenfelde and Steinburg, flows south under the L 112 and then in a southwesterly direction through Süderauerdorf, Audorf, and Süderau. From Süderau the Krempau flows northwest towards Krempe, curves to flow southwest again alongside Krempdorf and Borsfletherbüttel where it curves north and flows through Borsfleth and finally joins the Stör at river kilometer 45.8. The Kremper Au is shielded from flooding due to high waters in the Stör by sluice gates at Verlath.

== See also ==
- List of rivers of Schleswig-Holstein
