= Theodor Heinrich Engelbrecht =

German geographer (1853–1934)

Theodor Heinrich Engelbrecht (6 October 1853 – 18 October 1934) was a German agronomist, geographer, farmer and politician.

== Biography ==
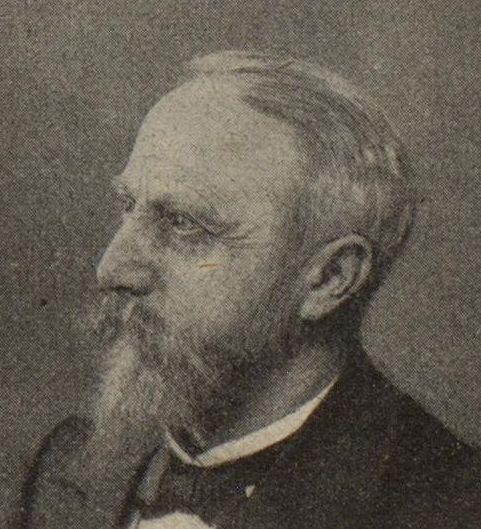
Theodor Hinrich Engelbrecht

He was born in Obendeich (near Glückstadt), in the Duchy of Holstein, at the time under the control of Denmark. He acquired his education at the universities of Leipzig and Strasbourg, and in 1911 received the honorary degree of doctor from the University of Breslau. In 1895 he joined the Prussian House of Representatives as a member of the Free Conservative Party.

== Works ==
- Die Landbauzonen der aussertropischen Länder (3 vols., 1899), a work on the study of agriculture in Europe
- Die geographische Verteilung der Getreidepreise (“Geographic distribution of grain prices,” 2 vols., 1908), the first volume dealing with the United States, the second with India
- Bodenbau und Viehstand in Schleswig-Holstein (1905)
