= Horst, Steinburg =

Horst
- Municipality
- Coat of arms

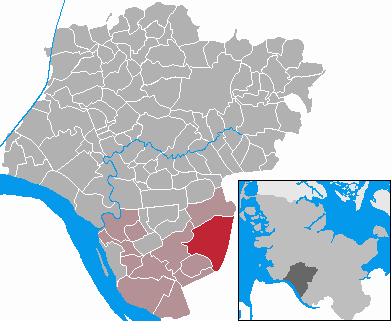
- Location of Horst within Steinburg district
- Interactive map of Horst
- Location within Germany Location within Schleswig-Holstein
- Coordinates: 53°48′40″N 9°37′6″E
- Country: Germany
- State: Schleswig-Holstein
- District: Steinburg
- Municipal assoc.: Horst-Herzhorn

Government
  - Mayor: Joern Ploeger

Area
  - Total: 29.06 km^{2} (11.22 sq mi)
- Elevation: 15 m (49 ft)

Population (2025-12-31)
  - Total: 6,027
  - Density: 207.4/km^{2} (537.2/sq mi)
- Time zone: UTC+01:00 (CET)
  - Summer (DST): UTC+02:00 (CEST)
- Postal codes: 25358
- Dialling codes: 04121, 04126
- Vehicle registration: IZ
- Website: www.amt-horst-herzhorn.de

Horst (German pronunciation: [hɔʁst]) is a municipality in the district of Steinburg, in Schleswig-Holstein, Germany. It is situated approximately 14 km southeast of Itzehoe, and 7 km northwest of Elmshorn.

Horst is the seat of the Amt ("collective municipality") Horst-Herzhorn.

== Geography ==
The municipal area of Horst is located in the natural region of Barmstedt-Kisdorfer Geest within the Südholsteinische Geest, northwest of the town of Elmshorn. The Schwarzwasser and Horstgraben rivers flow through the municipal area.

== History ==
The first documented mention of the place dates back to a donation document from Knight Heinrich II of Barmstede for the foundation of the Cistercian Nunnery in Uetersen in 1234. In this document, he donated 23 Stader Scheffel of winter wheat from Horst to the newly founded monastery. Over the following centuries, the monastery expanded its Horster possessions through donations and acquisitions to the extent that the entire village came under the jurisdiction of the monastery as a patrimonial estate. It wasn't until the Prussian administrative reforms starting in 1867 that the village became an independent municipality in the Steinburg district, no longer under the control of the Uetersen monastery. At that time, the parts of Moordiek and Schönmoor that had previously belonged to the Itzehoe monastery were incorporated into the village, while the Klein Grönland district was separated and added to the Grönland municipality.

Originally, Horst was predominantly agricultural. The total area of the municipality is relatively large, almost 3000 hectares, allowing for the settlement of over 100 farming positions, including 14 full-holders, 16 half-holders, and over 70 smallholders (Kätner) with land ownership. However, larger areas of moorland and heath were only partially suitable for agriculture. By granting church land along the Elmshorn-Itzehoe road, a larger settlement of Plincken, small residential houses with little garden land, emerged during the 18th century. These housed day laborers, traders, and craftsmen, leading to a population increase to over 2000 by 1850, making Horst the fourth largest settlement in the Steinburg region after Itzehoe, Glückstadt, and Wilster at the time. The connection to the Hamburg-Altona-Kiel railway line in 1844 by the Altona-Kieler Eisenbahn-Gesellschaft also contributed to population growth and the establishment of new commercial and trade enterprises. Despite its potential workforce, Horst had limited involvement in the industrialization at the end of the 19th century. The only significant industrial enterprise was H. Ottens' wool spinning mill, founded in 1864, which grew into a large industrial operation with several hundred employees by the 1930s.

Following World War II, the population nearly doubled due to the influx of refugees and displaced persons, from approximately 2600 inhabitants in 1939 to initially over 5000 in 1950, stabilizing around 4000 in the 1960s. With the development of new residential areas in recent decades, the population has now surpassed 5000 once again. Improved transport connections to Hamburg played a significant role in this growth. After the closure of the old Horst train station in the Hackelshörn district in 1987, a new railway station was opened in Horstheide in 2003. Additionally, a connection to the highway network was established in 1981.

== Coat of arms ==
The coat of arms of Grube is described as follows: "On a green field, a silver triple mountain, overlaid with a red shield containing a silver nettle leaf and three silver deciduous trees."

== Clubs ==
The largest club in the community is the MTV Horst, which offers activities such as faustball, handball, athletics, and table tennis. The VfR Horst (Association for Grass Sports Horst) has over 400 members and is primarily focused on youth and men's football. The first men's team has been playing in the Verbandsliga since 2009.

=== Handball ===
On April 19, 2010, the Handballspielgemeinschaft Horst/Kiebitzreihe (HSG Horst/Kiebitzreihe Südsteinburg) was founded from the handball departments of MTV Horst von 1913 e.V. and Rot-Weiß Kiebitzreihe e.V. Currently, there are 15 youth teams and five senior teams participating in the season 2022/2023. Both the first men's and women's teams compete in the Schleswig-Holstein Liga (5th league).

=== Scouts ===
For over 50 years, the Verband Christlicher Pfadfinderinnen und Pfadfinder, Stamm St. Georg Horst, has been providing valuable youth work for Horst and the surrounding communities.

== Economy and Infrastructure ==
=== Education ===
In the municipality of Horst, you can find the elementary school "Op de Host" and the comprehensive school "Jacob-Struve-Schule".

=== Transport ===
==== Road ====
The community of Horst is located at the junction of the Schleswig-Holstein state road 288 from the state road 100. The former provides a connection to the off-municipality exit Horst/Elmshorn (No. 13) of the Bundesautobahn 23 between Itzehoe and Elmshorn.

==== Rail ====
The community has a stop on the Hamburg-Altona–Kiel railway line (Horst in Holstein).

== Notable people ==
=== Sons and Daughters of the Municipality ===
- Joachim Friedrich Bolten (1718–1796), physician and conchologist
- Jacob Struve (1755–1841), mathematician and philologist
- Johannes Clauß Voß (1858–1922), German-Canadian mariner, circumnavigator
- Robert Scharmer (1862–1940), administrative jurist, civil servant
- Johannes Fock (1910–1986), librarian and library director in Hamburg
- Werner Gilde (1920–1991), expert in welding technology
- Claus-Robert Kruse (* 1948), musician, arranger, composer, and music producer

=== Associated with the Municipality ===
- Uwe John (1950–2008), politician (SPD), lived in Horst and was a member of the municipal council.
- Isi Glück (* 1991), Miss Germany 2012, resides in Horst and attended school here.
- Ernst Otto Karl Grassmé († 1992), lived as a hermit for decades in the Horst Peat Bog (his life was adapted into a film in 2015).
