= Kiebitzreihe =

- Municipality
- Coat of arms

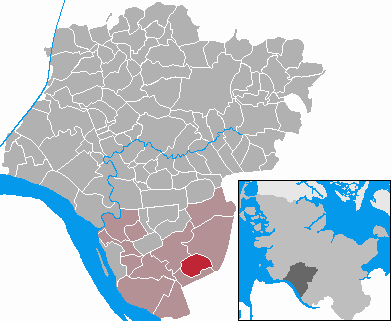
- Location of Kiebitzreihe within Steinburg district
- Interactive map of Kiebitzreihe
- Location within Germany Location within Schleswig-Holstein
- Coordinates: 53°47′N 9°37′E
- Country: Germany
- State: Schleswig-Holstein
- District: Steinburg
- Municipal assoc.: Horst-Herzhorn

Government
  - Mayor: Frauke Biehl (CDU)

Area
  - Total: 8.7 km^{2} (3.4 sq mi)
- Elevation: 4 m (13 ft)

Population (2025-12-31)
  - Total: 2,190
  - Density: 250/km^{2} (650/sq mi)
- Time zone: UTC+01:00 (CET)
  - Summer (DST): UTC+02:00 (CEST)
- Postal codes: 25368
- Dialling codes: 04121, 04126
- Vehicle registration: IZ
- Website: www.kiebitzreihe.de

Kiebitzreihe is a municipality in the district of Steinburg, in Schleswig-Holstein, Germany.
