= Elbe Marshes =

Coordinates: 53°26′N 10°22′E

Elbe Marshes (Lower Elbe Lowland)
- Classification: Handbook of Natural Region Divisions of Germany
- Level 1 Region: North German Plain
- Level 2 Region: Marshland
- Level 3 Region: 67 → Elbe Marshes
- State(s): Lower Saxony, Schleswig-Holstein, Hamburg
- Country: Germany

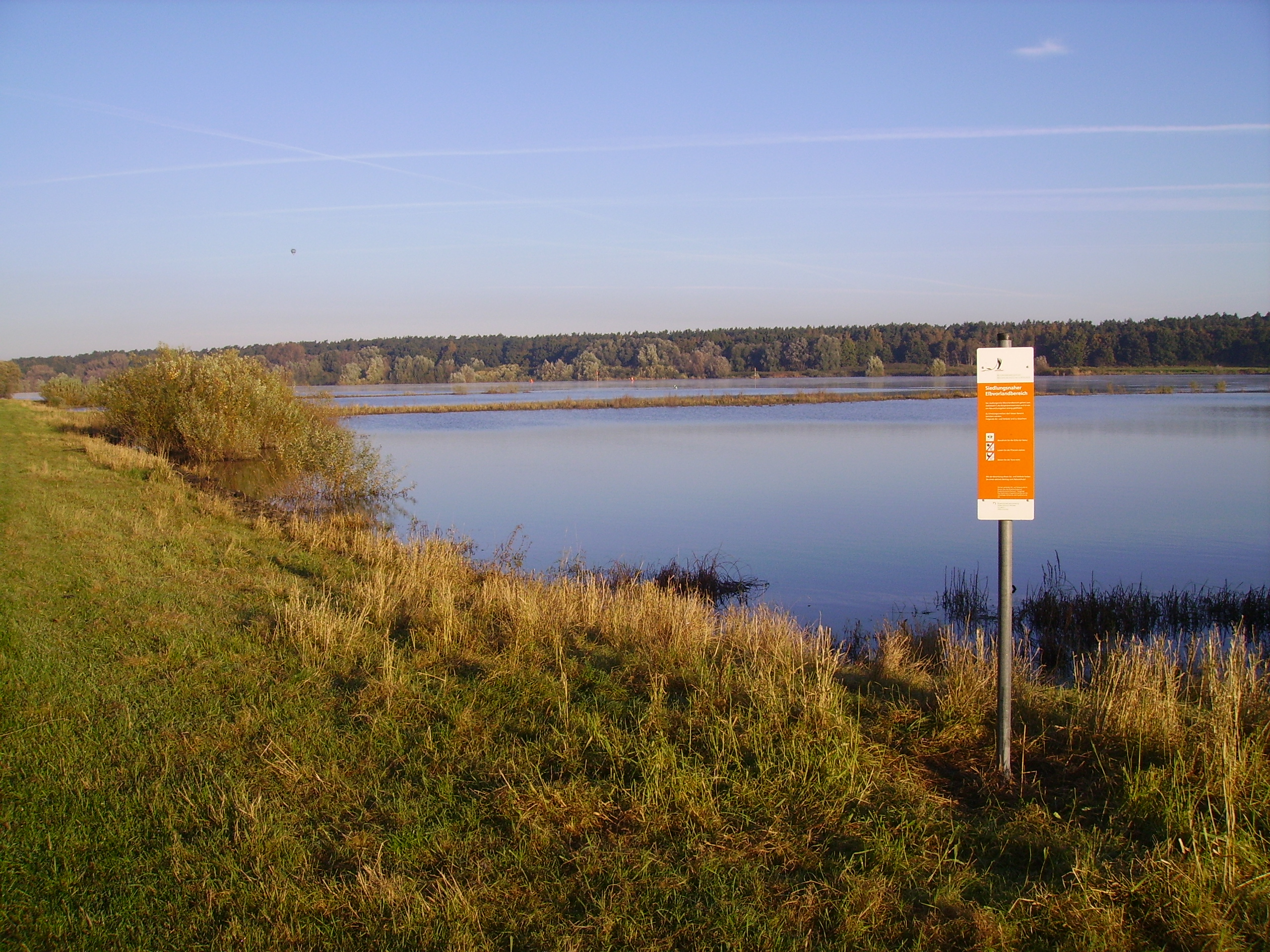
Flooded terrain in front of the dikes of the Lüneburg Elbe marshes

The Elbe marshes (German: Elbmarsch) are an extensive region of marsh or polderland along the lower and middle reaches of the River Elbe in northern Germany. It is also referred to as the Lower Elbe Marsch by Dickinson and is region D24 in the BfN's list of the natural regions of Germany. The Germans refer to these polders as Marschen (singular: Marsch).

Originally this flat strip of land along the Elbe was completely tidal. But following the construction of the barrage near Geesthacht, the Elbe is no longer affected by the tide above that point. The part of the Elbe remaining tidal is called the Unterelbe (Low Elbe). As a result of regular land reclamation with the help of Dutch settlers (a process known in German as Hollerkolonisation) large areas of the previously flood-prone Elbe marshes were diked and reclaimed for the purposes of cultivation.

The Elbe marshes are very fertile and dominated by large areas of grassland. In addition to cattle rearing, especially of dairy herds, they are also used for arable farming. Dithmarschen is especially well known for its cabbages, the Altes Land is one of the largest fruit growing regions of central Europe, the Vierlande and Marschlande near Hamburg belong to the most important areas for growing vegetables and flowers. The Kehdinger Land and the Lüneburg Elbe marshes are home to numerous stud farms. For over 200 years the successful Hanoverian horses have been bred here.

In the 1990s there were national reports from the Elbe marshes that there had been a higher incidence of leukaemia in the area around the GKSS Research Centre and the Krümmel nuclear power station. However, no direct link has been proven between the levels of illness and the nuclear facilities.

== Holstein Elbe marshes ==
The Holstein Elbe marshes lie in southern Schleswig-Holstein along the Lower Elbe. They are intensively farmed. Many commuters who work in Hamburg also live in the area. The land is flat and lies barely one metre above sea level. In the vicinity of Neuendorf near Wilster is the lowest point in Germany. As a result, the countryside here is also at risk from storm floods and is protected by dikes along the Elbe.

The Elbe marshes here are made up (from north to south) of the Wilster Marsh between the Kiel Canal and Stör, the Kremper Marsh, between Stör and Krückau, the Seestermühe Marsh between Krückau and Pinnau and the Haseldorf Marsh between Pinnau and the edge of the geest area near Wedel.

== Lower Saxon Elbe marshes ==
The Lower Saxon Elbe marshes begin at Land Hadeln and Kehdingen and stretch east of Stade through the Altes Land as far as the city limits of Hamburg in Cranz. Running up the Elbe from Hamburg they follow the Winsen and Lüneburg Elbe marshes (Elbmarsch).

== See also ==
- Geography of Germany
- Natural regions of Germany
