= Sommerland =

- Municipality
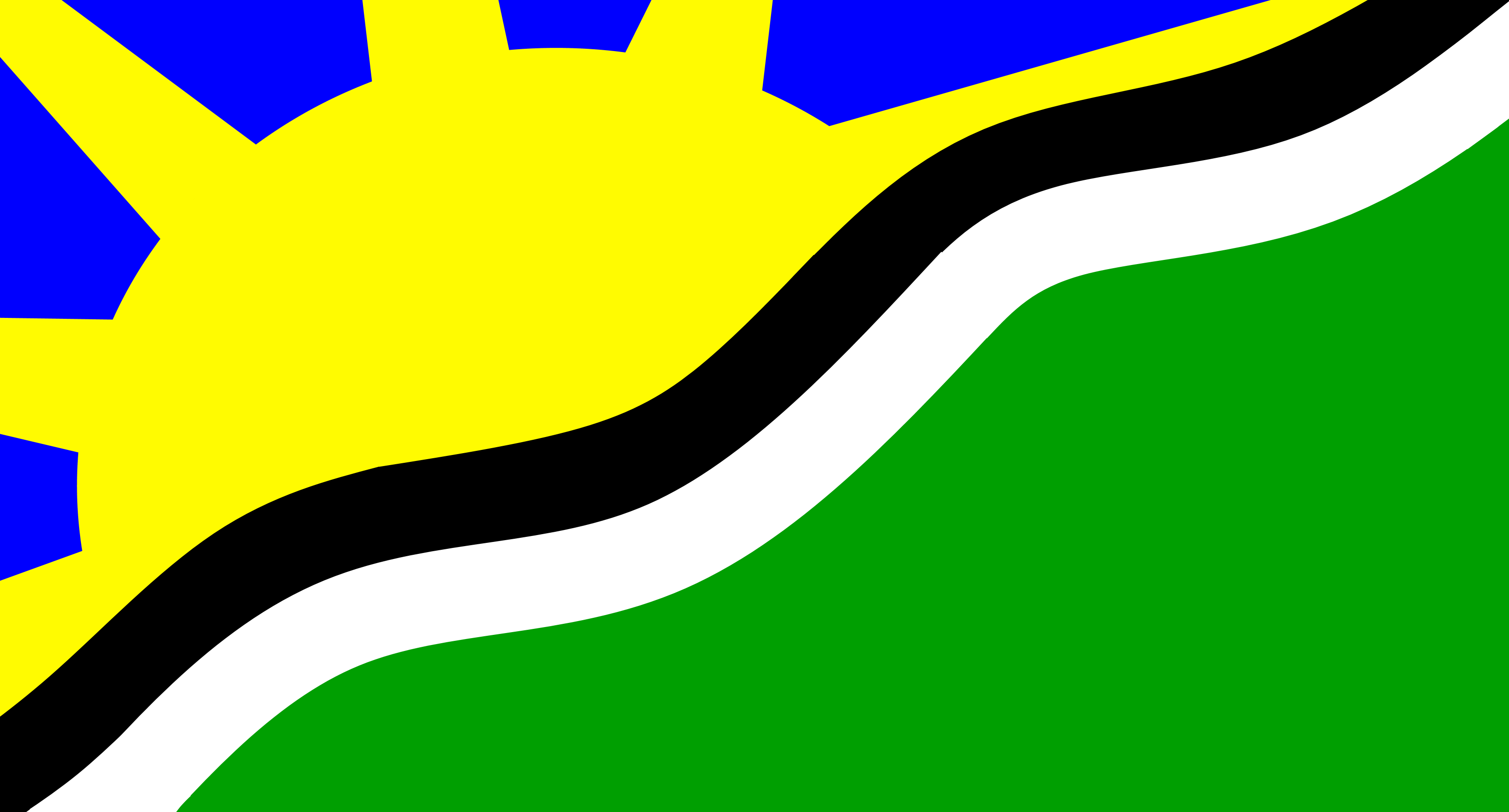
- Flag Coat of arms

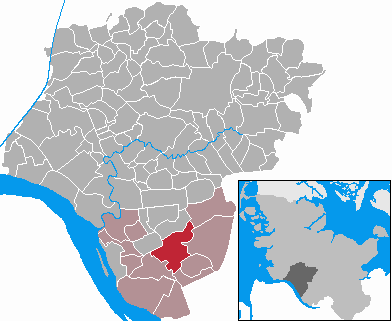
- Location of Sommerland within Steinburg district
- Interactive map of Sommerland
- Location within Germany Location within Schleswig-Holstein
- Coordinates: 53°48′6″N 9°32′23″E
- Country: Germany
- State: Schleswig-Holstein
- District: Steinburg
- Municipal assoc.: Horst-Herzhorn
- Subdivisions: 5

Government
  - Mayor: Helga Ellerbrock

Area
  - Total: 18.76 km^{2} (7.24 sq mi)
- Elevation: 2 m (6.6 ft)

Population (2025-12-31)
  - Total: 737
  - Density: 39.3/km^{2} (102/sq mi)
- Time zone: UTC+01:00 (CET)
  - Summer (DST): UTC+02:00 (CEST)
- Postal codes: 25358
- Dialling codes: 04126, 04824
- Vehicle registration: IZ
- Website: www.amt-horst-herzhorn.de

Sommerland (German pronunciation: [ˈzɔmɐlant]) is a municipality in the district of Steinburg, in Schleswig-Holstein, Germany.
