= Altenmoor =

- Municipality
- Coat of arms

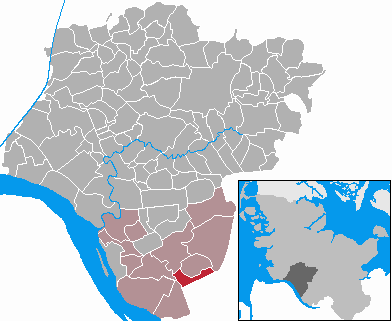
- Location of Altenmoor within Steinburg district
- Interactive map of Altenmoor
- Location within Germany Location within Schleswig-Holstein
- Coordinates: 53°46′N 9°34′E
- Country: Germany
- State: Schleswig-Holstein
- District: Steinburg
- Municipal assoc.: Horst-Herzhorn

Government
  - Mayor: Wilfried Wulff

Area
  - Total: 6.12 km^{2} (2.36 sq mi)
- Elevation: 0 m (0 ft)

Population (2025-12-31)
  - Total: 235
  - Density: 38.4/km^{2} (99.5/sq mi)
- Time zone: UTC+01:00 (CET)
  - Summer (DST): UTC+02:00 (CEST)
- Postal codes: 25335
- Dialling codes: 04121
- Vehicle registration: IZ
- Website: www.amt-horst-herzhorn.de

Altenmoor is a municipality in the district of Steinburg, in Schleswig-Holstein, Germany.
