= Adolph Carl Peter Callisen =

German-Danish physician and lexicographer

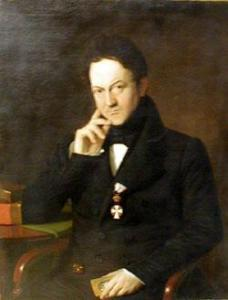
Portrait of Callisen by Bernhard Axel Bendixen (1837)

Adolph Carl Peter Callisen (8 April 1786 in Glückstadt – 7 March 1866 in Wandsbek) was a German-Danish medical doctor and lexicographer.

He studied medicine at the universities of Kiel and Copenhagen, receiving his doctorate in 1809. In 1816 he was named an associate professor at the Royal Danish Academy of Surgery in Copenhagen, where in 1829 he attained a full professorship. In 1842 he became a professor at the University of Copenhagen because of a merger with the surgical academy.

From 1830 to 1845 he published a 33 volume lexicon of medical professionals, titled Medicinisches Schriftsteller-Lexicon der jetzt lebenden Aerzte, Wundärzte, Geburtshelfer, Apotheker und Naturforscher aller gebildeten Völker ("Medical writer lexicon of now living physicians, surgeons, obstetricians, pharmacists and naturalists of all civilized nations"). He also published a German translation of a surgical manual (System der neueren Chirurgie, 1822–24) written by his uncle, Heinrich Callisen (1740–1824), in Latin.
