= Hohe Geest =

Region in North Germany

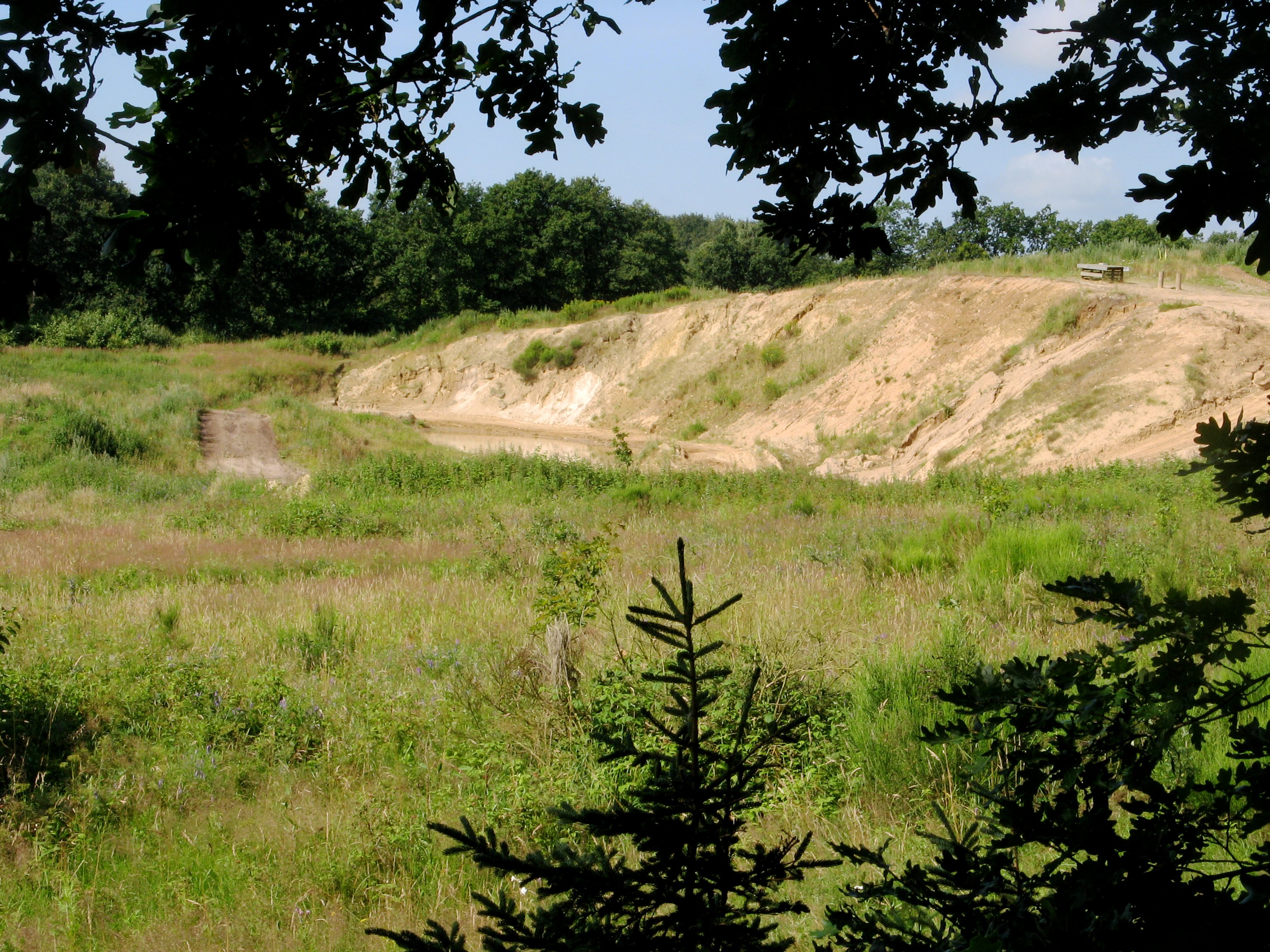
Hohe Geest

The Hohe Geest ("High Geest") is a region in North Germany that consists of the old moraines and end moraines of the earlier ice ages. This geest region which comprises the "Hohe" and the "Niedere Geest" ("Low Geest"), is the central natural region in the German state of Schleswig-Holstein.

Part of the Hohe Geest is the Heide-Itzehoe Geest.

The Hohe Geest is also the name of a road in Münster (Westfalen).
