= Horst-Herzhorn =

- Amt
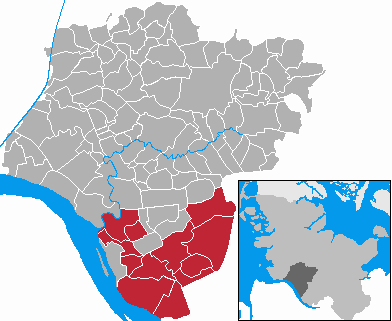
- Map of Steinburg highlighting Horst-Herzhorn
- Interactive map of Horst-Herzhorn
- Location within Germany Location within Schleswig-Holstein
- Coordinates: 53°48′N 9°37′E
- Country: Germany
- State: Schleswig-Holstein
- District: Steinburg
- Seat: Horst
- Subdivisions: 12 municipalities

Area
  - Total: 174.52 km^{2} (67.38 sq mi)

Population (2025-12-31)
  - Total: 16,042
  - Density: 91.921/km^{2} (238.07/sq mi)
- Time zone: UTC+01:00 (CET)
  - Summer (DST): UTC+02:00 (CEST)
- Website: www.amt-horst-herzhorn.de

Horst-Herzhorn is an Amt (collective municipality) in the district of Steinburg, in Schleswig-Holstein, Germany. The seat of the Amt is in Horst. Before 1 January 2008, when it was merged with the Amt Herzhorn, it was named Amt Horst.

The Amt Horst-Herzhorn consists of the following municipalities:

1. Altenmoor
2. Blomesche Wildnis
3. Borsfleth
4. Engelbrechtsche Wildnis
5. Herzhorn
6. Hohenfelde
7. Horst
8. Kiebitzreihe
9. Kollmar
10. Krempdorf
11. Neuendorf bei Elmshorn
12. Sommerland
