= Willi Holdorf =

West German athlete (1940–2020)

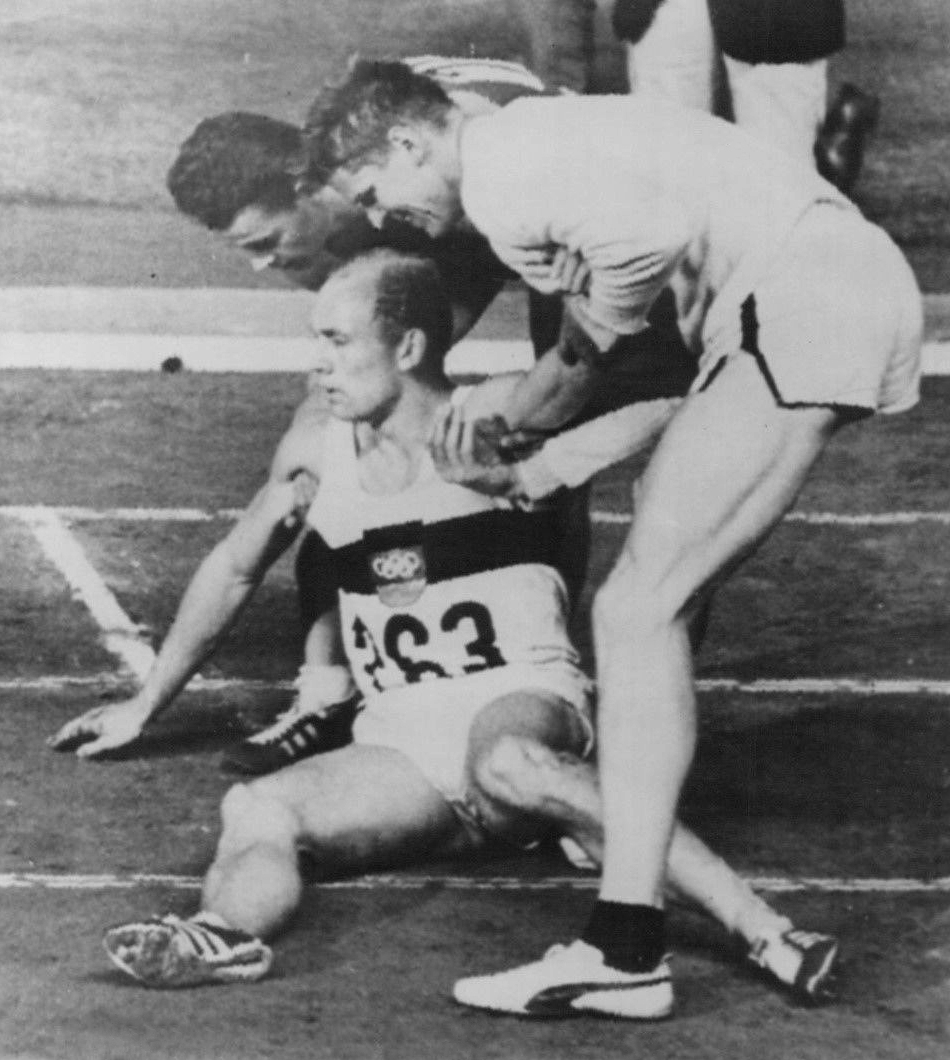
- Willi Holdorf at the 1964 Olympics

Personal information
- Born: 17 February 1940 Blomesche Wildnis, Schleswig-Holstein, Prussia, Germany
- Died: 5 July 2020 (aged 80) Achterwehr, Schleswig-Holstein, Germany
- Height: 1.82 m (6 ft 0 in)
- Weight: 90 kg (198 lb)

Sport
- Sport: Decathlon
- Club: Bayer Leverkusen

Achievements and titles
- Personal best: 7726 (1964)
Medal record
Representing Germany
Olympic Games
Gold medal – first place	1964 Tokyo	Decathlon

Willi Holdorf (German pronunciation: [ˈvɪli ˈhɔlˌdɔʁf]; 17 February 1940 – 5 July 2020) was a West German athlete.

== Career ==
In 1964 he won the first Olympic medal for Germany in decathlon and was named German Sportspersonality of the Year. In 1997, he became a member of the German Olympic Committee, and in 2011 inducted into the German Sports Hall of Fame.

Holdorf was the German champion in 1961 and 1963 in decathlon, and in 1962 in the 200 m hurdles. He placed fifth in decathlon at the European Championships in 1962 and 1964. He was trained as a high-voltage electrician, but later worked as a sporting goods representative and a coach, both in athletics and football. He coached Olympic pole vaulter Claus Schiprowski, Reinhard Kuretzky and Günther Nickel, and later managed German Bundesliga side SC Fortuna Köln in football, where he could not avoid relegation. At the Bobsleigh European Championships 1973 he was runner up in the two men competition.

Holdorf was the father of Dirk Holdorf, a former professional football player.

== See also ==
- Germany's Sports Hall of Fame

Awards and achievements
Preceded by (Germany) Gerhard Hetz	German Sportsman of the Year; 1964	Succeeded by (Germany) Hans-Joachim Klein
