= Kollmar =

- Municipality
- Coat of arms

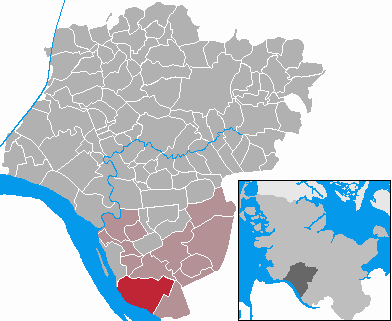
- Location of Kollmar within Steinburg district
- Interactive map of Kollmar
- Location within Germany Location within Schleswig-Holstein
- Coordinates: 53°45′N 9°30′E
- Country: Germany
- State: Schleswig-Holstein
- District: Steinburg
- Municipal assoc.: Horst-Herzhorn

Government
  - Mayor: Jens Brockmüller

Area
  - Total: 32.82 km^{2} (12.67 sq mi)
- Elevation: 0 m (0 ft)

Population (2025-12-31)
  - Total: 1,627
  - Density: 49.57/km^{2} (128.4/sq mi)
- Time zone: UTC+01:00 (CET)
  - Summer (DST): UTC+02:00 (CEST)
- Postal codes: 25377
- Dialling codes: 04124, 04128
- Vehicle registration: IZ
- Website: www.amt-horst-herzhorn.de

Kollmar is a municipality in the district of Steinburg, in Schleswig-Holstein, Germany.

== Geography and Transport ==
Kollmar is located approximately 13 km west of Elmshorn, directly on the Elbe in the Kremper Marsch. To the northeast runs the Federal Road 431 from Elmshorn to Glückstadt.

== History ==
Kollmar was first mentioned as a parish in the church district of Asvlet in 1377. Asvlet, located downstream from Kollmar on the Elbe River, was eventually lost to the floods of the Elbe. The church district was last mentioned in 1393.

In 1494, Hans von Ahlefeldt acquired the Haseldorf Marsh, which at the time included Seestermühe and Kollmar. The Ahlefeldt family remained in possession of Kollmar until 1626. They constructed Oevelgönne Castle (meaning "envy") in 1586, with the Italian architect Franz de Rocha as the builder. The dilapidated castle was demolished in 1815. In 1959, during construction work at the intersection of Strohdeich-Deichreihe-Langenhals roads (coordinates: about 53.751169, 9.473952), remnants of the former castle mound were found, including fragments of masonry and sandstone decorations, as well as cobblestone paving.

From 1657 to 1658, the area was almost completely destroyed by Swedish mercenaries.

The estates of Klein-Kollmar and Groß-Kollmar emerged in 1716. In 1820, Count von Kielmannsegge, who had owned Klein-Kollmar since 1776, also acquired the Groß-Kollmar estate. In 1862, his descendant sold the estate to local farmers.

The current municipality was formed on September 1, 1974, through the merger of the municipalities of Groß Kollmar and Klein Kollmar.

== Economy ==
Kollmar is a parish village that is still predominantly agricultural. Tourism (local recreation) also plays a role. In addition, many commuters who work in nearby Elmshorn, Glückstadt, or Hamburg reside in the area.

== Notable people ==
- Thusnelda Kühl (born August 14, 1872, in Kollmar; died July 24, 1935, in Rendsburg), writer
- Peter Weber (born 1944 in Kollmar), artist

== Attractions ==
Kollmar is a popular destination for day-trippers from surrounding areas who enjoy watching ships pass along the Elbe shore. Unlike the Seestermüher Marsh and parts of the Haseldorf Marsh, the shipping lane is close to the shore and not obscured by any Elbe island. The midpoint of the Elbe forms the municipal boundary and also the state border with Lower Saxony. A small part of the nature reserve "Elbe Island Pagensand" is also located within the municipal area. Nearly the entire municipal area is within the "Kollmar Marsh" landscape protection area, established on July 10, 1980.

A notable sight is the Church of Kollmar from the mid-15th century, a single-naved brick building with a three-sided eastern closure.

In 2003, the molehill-style windmill from 1815 burned down completely along with its historic outbuilding.
