= Dirk Holdorf =

German footballer and manager

Personal information
- Full name: Dirk Holdorf
- Date of birth: 3 September 1966 (age 60)
- Height: 1.88 m (6 ft 2 in)
- Position: Midfielder

Senior career*
Years	Team	Apps	(Gls)
–1988	VfB Kiel		
1988–1990	Eintracht Braunschweig	34	(4)

Managerial career
- 1998: Eintracht Braunschweig (caretaker)
- * Club domestic league appearances and goals

Dirk Holdorf (born 3 September 1966) is a retired German football player. He spent two seasons in the 2. Bundesliga with Eintracht Braunschweig. After retiring as a player, Holdorf later became business manager at the club and also took over as caretaker manager for a short time in 1998. He was released by the club together with manager Peter Vollmann after a 1–2 defeat against Karlsruher SC during the 2002–03 2. Bundesliga season.

== Personal life ==
Dirk Holdorf is the son of Willi Holdorf, gold medalist in decathlon at the 1964 Summer Olympics.
