= Neuendorf bei Elmshorn =

- Municipality
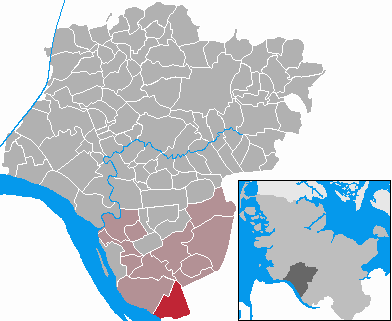
- Location of Neuendorf bei Elmshorn within Steinburg district
- Interactive map of Neuendorf bei Elmshorn
- Location within Germany Location within Schleswig-Holstein
- Coordinates: 53°44′N 9°34′E
- Country: Germany
- State: Schleswig-Holstein
- District: Steinburg
- Municipal assoc.: Horst-Herzhorn

Government
  - Mayor: Heinrich Greve

Area
  - Total: 15.78 km^{2} (6.09 sq mi)
- Elevation: 6 m (20 ft)

Population (2025-12-31)
  - Total: 801
  - Density: 50.8/km^{2} (131/sq mi)
- Time zone: UTC+01:00 (CET)
  - Summer (DST): UTC+02:00 (CEST)
- Postal codes: 25335
- Dialling codes: 04121 bzw. 04128
- Vehicle registration: IZ
- Website: www.amt-horst- herzhorn.de

Neuendorf bei Elmshorn is a municipality in the district of Steinburg, in Schleswig-Holstein, Germany.
