= Krückau =

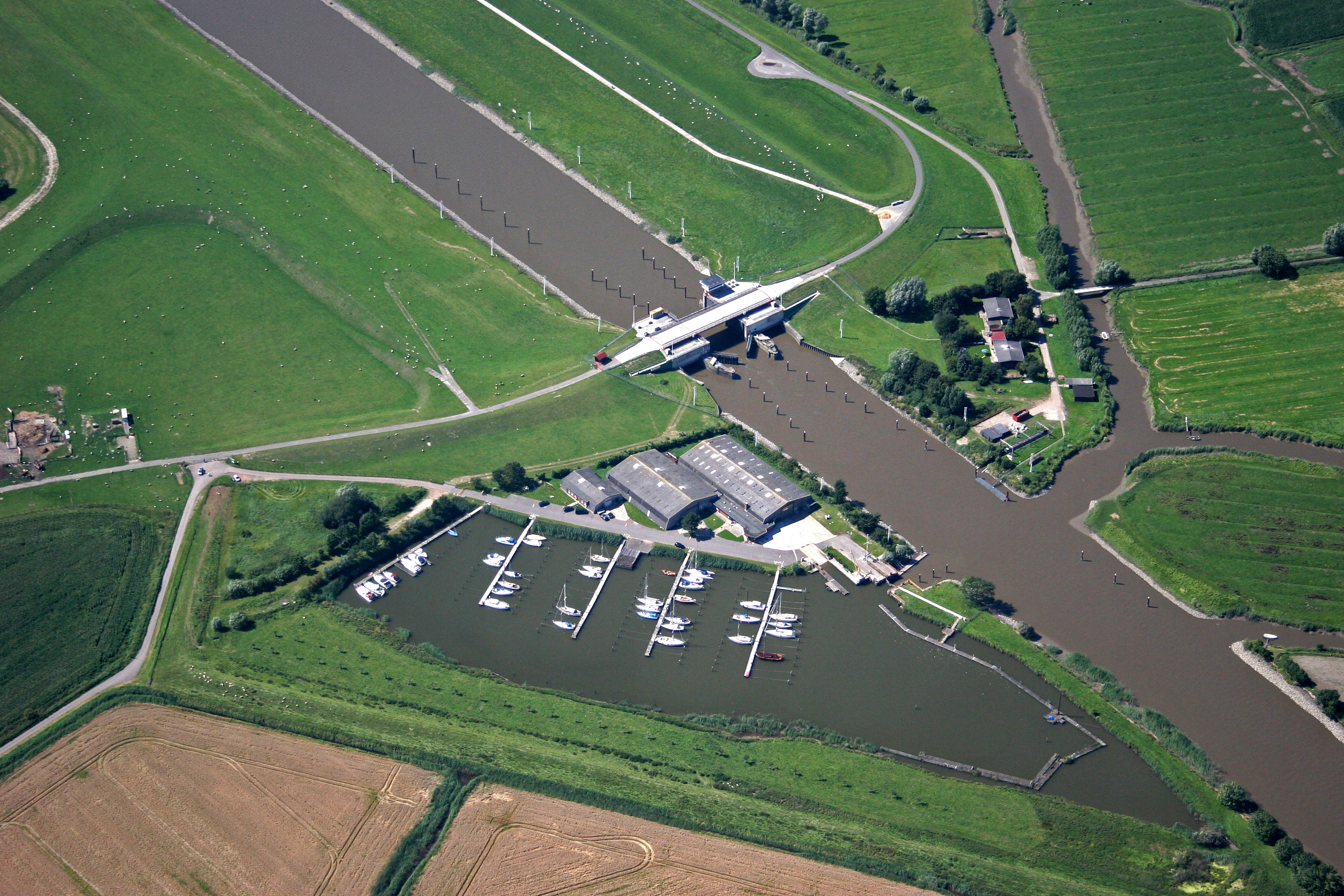

Location
- Country: Germany
- State: Schleswig-Holstein

Physical characteristics
- Mouth
  - location: Elbe
  - coordinates: 53.7144°N 9.5118°E

Basin features
- Progression: Elbe→ North Sea

Krückau is a river in the federal state of Schleswig-Holstein in the north of Germany. It flows into the river Elbe near Seestermühe. The 11.3 km (7.0 mi) lower part between the Elbe and Elmshorn is navigable but not classified.

== See also ==
- List of rivers of Schleswig-Holstein
