= Krempdorf =

- Municipality
- Coat of arms

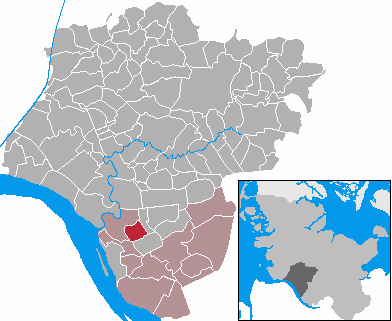
- Location of Krempdorf within Steinburg district
- Interactive map of Krempdorf
- Location within Germany Location within Schleswig-Holstein
- Coordinates: 53°50′N 9°28′E
- Country: Germany
- State: Schleswig-Holstein
- District: Steinburg
- Municipal assoc.: Horst-Herzhorn
- Subdivisions: 2 Ortsteile

Government
  - Mayor: Dörte Harms

Area
  - Total: 5.64 km^{2} (2.18 sq mi)
- Elevation: 5 m (16 ft)

Population (2025-12-31)
  - Total: 242
  - Density: 42.9/km^{2} (111/sq mi)
- Time zone: UTC+01:00 (CET)
  - Summer (DST): UTC+02:00 (CEST)
- Postal codes: 25376
- Dialling codes: 04124, 04824
- Vehicle registration: IZ
- Website: www.amt-horst-herzhorn.de

Krempdorf is a municipality in the district of Steinburg, in Schleswig-Holstein, Germany.
