= Borsfleth =

- Municipality
- Coat of arms

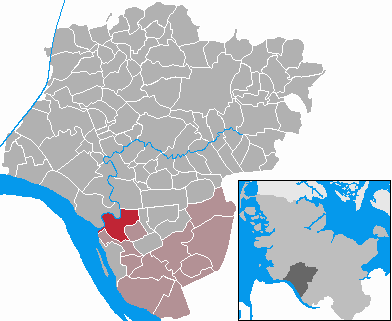
- Location of Borsfleth within Steinburg district
- Interactive map of Borsfleth
- Location within Germany Location within Schleswig-Holstein
- Coordinates: 53°49′N 9°25′E
- Country: Germany
- State: Schleswig-Holstein
- District: Steinburg
- Municipal assoc.: Horst-Herzhorn

Government
  - Mayor: Peter Mohr

Area
  - Total: 15.19 km^{2} (5.86 sq mi)
- Elevation: 2 m (6.6 ft)

Population (2025-12-31)
  - Total: 775
  - Density: 51.0/km^{2} (132/sq mi)
- Time zone: UTC+01:00 (CET)
  - Summer (DST): UTC+02:00 (CEST)
- Postal codes: 25376
- Dialling codes: 04124, 04824
- Vehicle registration: IZ
- Website: www.amt-horst-herzhorn.de

Borsfleth is a municipality in the district of Steinburg, in Schleswig-Holstein, Germany.
