= Blomesche Wildnis =

- Municipality
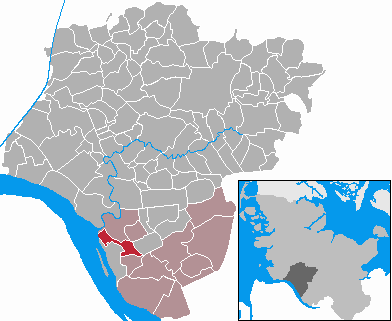
- Location of Blomesche Wildnis within Steinburg district
- Interactive map of Blomesche Wildnis
- Location within Germany Location within Schleswig-Holstein
- Coordinates: 53°48′38″N 9°25′29″E
- Country: Germany
- State: Schleswig-Holstein
- District: Steinburg
- Municipal assoc.: Horst-Herzhorn

Government
  - Mayor: Niels Schilling

Area
  - Total: 6.92 km^{2} (2.67 sq mi)
- Elevation: 0 m (0 ft)

Population (2025-12-31)
  - Total: 583
  - Density: 84.2/km^{2} (218/sq mi)
- Time zone: UTC+01:00 (CET)
  - Summer (DST): UTC+02:00 (CEST)
- Postal codes: 25348
- Dialling codes: 04124
- Vehicle registration: IZ
- Website: www.amt-horst-herzhorn.de

Blomesche Wildnis is a municipality in the district of Steinburg, in Schleswig-Holstein, Germany. It lies to the north and east of the town of Glückstadt.
