= Alpentor =

Glacially-formed areas in the Alps

An alpentor (literally "Alpine gateway", plural alpentore) in geology is the point where an entire glacier forced its way through to the Alpine Foreland from the Alps during the ice age.

== Alpentore during the Würm glaciation ==
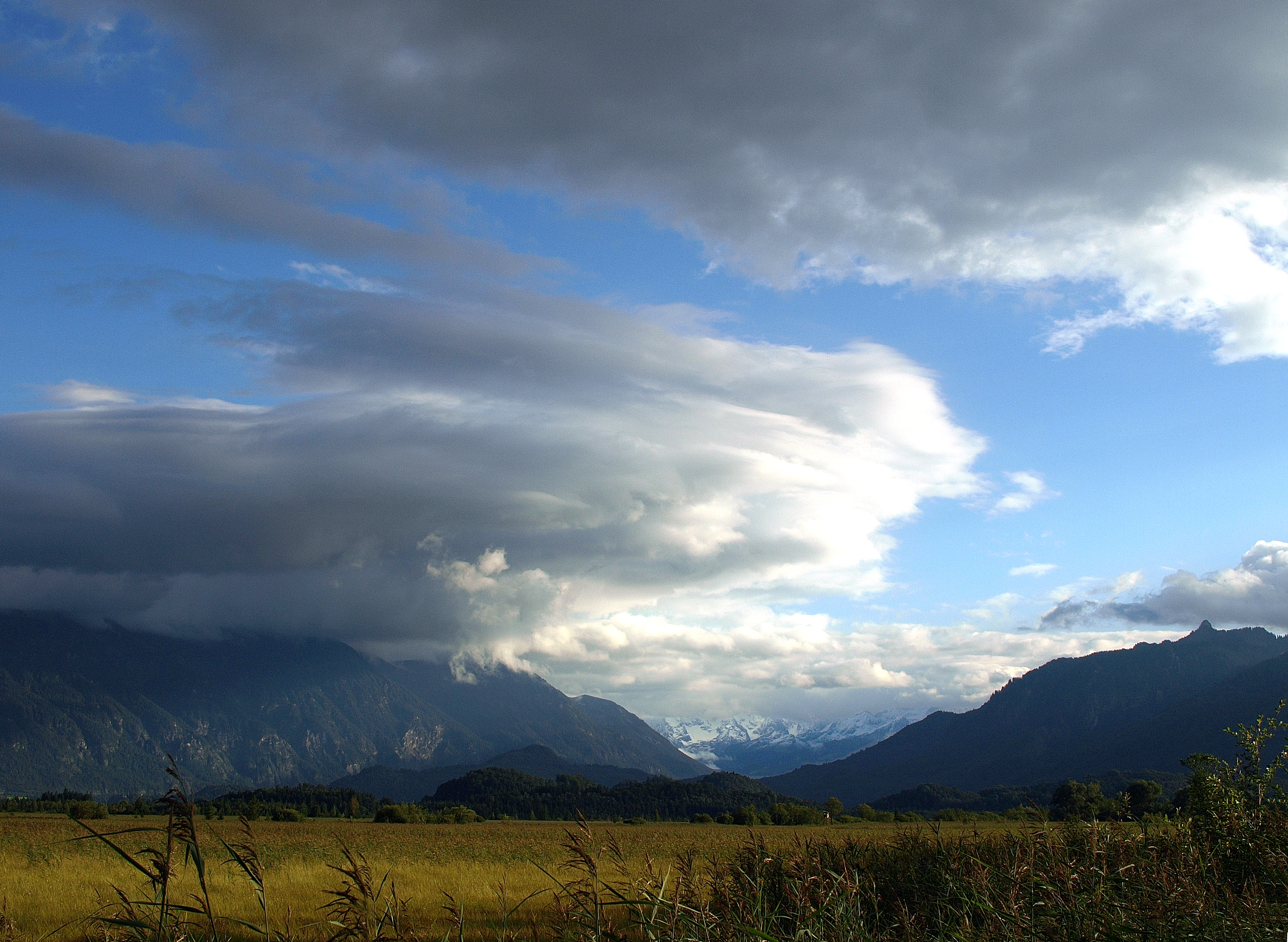
Murnauer Moos with its alpentor

During the Würm glaciation, where several glaciers from different Alpine valleys met or flowed through narrow passages at the edge of the Alps, ice was piled up. Such bottlenecks had a significant impact on the level of the ice sheet which meant that it eventually flowed over low mountain passes and ridges and the glaciers were combined into a network of ice streams.

Alpentore, through which particularly large masses of ice poured into the surrounding plains, were mainly located at the mouths of large longitudinal valleys such as Inn, Rhine or Salzach valleys. These glaciers penetrated up to 50 kilometres (31 mi) into the lowlands. Even valleys that appear rather insignificant today such as those of the Isar, Loisach and Ammer rivers, were able to produce large tongues of ice when their glaciers were fed by larger ones, such as the Inn Valley Glacier (e.g. via the Fern Pass). By contrast with such large glaciers, quite isolated valleys, such as those of the Iller or the Lech, could only produce much smaller glacial tongues.

A further prerequisite for glaciers extending into the Alpine foreland are high mountains. East of the Salzach, glacier tongues hardly reached the edge of the Alps, because the mountains of the Low Tauern, unlike those of the High Tauern did not produce enough ice. So the alpentore were found mainly in the Bavarian Alpine Foreland. One of the few examples at the southern edge of the Alps was the comparatively small alpentor of today's Tagliamento valley.

== Examples of Inn valley glaciers ==
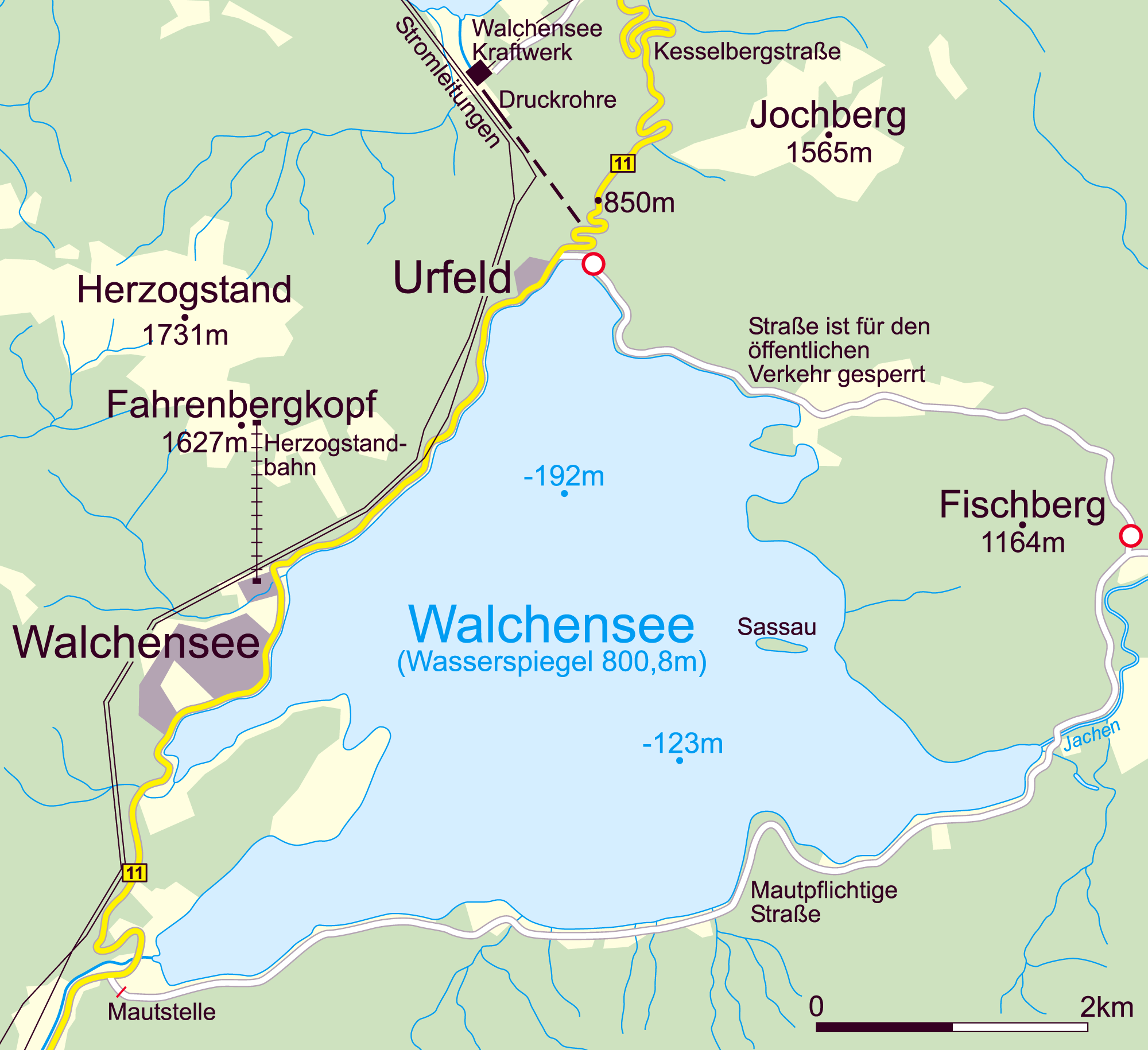
The Walchensee

In the Inn Valley (towards Rosenheim) the Inn Glacier was forced between the Wildbarren and the Kranzhorn at a height of about 1,300 m above sea level (NN). A tributary, the Isar valley glacier flowed south from Bad Tölz between the Blomberg and the Rechelkopf at a height of about 1,000 m (3,300 ft) into the plains.

At the Walchensee and Kochelsee lakes a tributary of the Inn Glacier pushed through over the Kesselberg at a height of 1,400 m (4,600 ft) between the Jochberg and the Herzogstand.

The Loisach Glacier, another tributary, flowed between the Wank and the Kramerspitz near Garmisch at a height of about 1,700 m (5,600 ft). In present-day Murnau the ice stream reached a height of 1,200 m (3,900 ft).
