= Buchberg =

Buchberg is the name of the following places:

Municipalities:

- Buchberg (Mecklenburg), Ludwigslust-Parchim district, Mecklenburg-Vorpommern, Germany
- Buchberg SH, Kanton Schaffhausen, Switzerland

Cadastral municipalities and villages:

- Buchberg bei Steinbühl, village in the borough of Bad Kötzting, Cham district, Bavaria
- Buchberg bei Wettzell, village in the borough of Bad Kötzting, Cham district, Bavaria
- Buchberg (Brennberg), village in the municipality of Brennberg, Regensburg district, Bavaria
- Buchberg (Bruckberg), village in the municipality of Bruckberg, Landshut district, Bavaria
- Buchberg (Feldkirchen-Westerham), village in the municipality of Feldkirchen-Westerham, Rosenheim district, Bavaria
- Buchberg (Fischbachau), village in the municipality of Fischbachau, Miesbach district, Bavaria
- Buchberg (Gangkofen), Ortsteil der Marktgemeinde Gangkofen, Rottal-Inn district, Bavaria
- Buchberg (Geretsried), village in the borough of Geretsried, Bad Tölz-Wolfratshausen district, Bavaria
- Buchberg (Herrngiersdorf), village in the municipality of Herrngiersdorf, Kelheim district, Bavaria
- Buchberg (Hohenau), village in the municipality of Hohenau, Freyung-Grafenau district, Bavaria
- Buchberg (Moosthenning), village in the municipality of Moosthenning, Dingolfing-Landau district, Bavaria
- Buchberg (Nußdorf am Inn), village in the municipality of Nußdorf am Inn, Rosenheim district, Bavaria
- Buchberg (Offenberg), village in the municipality of Offenberg, Deggendorf district, Bavaria
- Buchberg (Reut), village in the municipality of Reut, Rottal-Inn district, Bavaria
- Buchberg (Rimsting), village in the municipality of Rimsting, Rosenheim district, Bavaria
- Buchberg (Schleching), village in the municipality of Schleching, Traunstein district, Bavaria
- Buchberg (Sengenthal), village in the municipality of Sengenthal, Neumarkt in the Oberpfalz district, Bavaria
- Buchberg (Taching am See), village in the municipality of Taching am See, Traunstein district, Bavaria
- Buchberg (Traunreut), village in the borough of Traunreut, Traunstein district, Bavaria
- Buchberg (Viechtach), village in the borough of Viechtach, Regen district, Bavaria
- Buchberg (Wackersberg), village in the municipality of Wackersberg, Bad Tölz-Wolfratshausen district, Bavaria
- Buchberg am Kamp, cadastral municipality of Gars am Kamp in Lower Austria
- Buchberg (Bischofshofen), cadastral municipality and mountain in Salzburg
- Buchberg (Gemeinde Ebbs), cadastral municipality in Tyrol
- Buchberg (Gemeinde Goldegg), cadastral municipality in Salzburg
- Buchberg (Gemeinde Ilz), cadastral municipality in the Styria
- Buchberg (Gemeinde Reinsberg), cadastral municipality in Lower Austria
- Buchberg (Gemeinde Stubenberg), cadastral municipality in the Styria
- a village in the municipality of Bogda, Kreis Timiş, Rumänien
- a settlement in the Iser Mountains, Czech Republic, now part of the village of Jerserka

Buchberg is the name of the following hills and mountains:

- Buchberg (Blumberg), mountain neari Blumberg, Schwarzwald-Baar district, Baden-Württemberg
- Buchberg (Fichtelgebirge), 674 m, mountain near Kirchenlamitz in theBavarian Fichtelgebirge
- Buchberg (Kiefersfelden), mountain with Church of the Holy Cross in the municipality of Kiefersfelden in Bavaria, Germany
- Buchberg (Lange Berge), 528 m, highest mountain the Lange Berge, Coburg district, Bavaria
- Buchberg (Main-Kinzig-Kreis), mountain with observation tower in Langenselbold, Hesse
- Buchberg (Mattsee), 801 m, Aussichtsberg in the municipality of Mattsee, Salzburg state
- Buchberg (Upper Palatinate), 591 m, near Neumarkt, Upper Palatinate, Bavaria
- Buchberg (Seubersdorf), 607,3 m, near Seubersdorf, district Neumarkt in the Oberpfalz, Bavaria
- Buchberg (Zittau Mountains), 652 m, mountain im Zittau Mountains in Saxony, Germany
- Buchberg (Vienna Woods), 469 m, lookout mountain near Maria-Anzbach, Lower Austria
- Buechberg, 631 m, at the Obersee (Zürichsee) lakeshore, Switzerland
- Buková hora, 683 m, Bohemian Central Uplands, Czech Republic
- Buková hora, 958 m, Orlické Mountains, Czech Republic
- Bukovec (Isergebirge), 1,005 m, Iser Mountains, Czech Republic
- Goldegger Buchberg, 1,200 m, Dienten Mountains, Salzburg state
- Buchberg near Neusalza-Spremberg (Saxony), see Sonneberg (hill)

== See also ==
- Puchberg (disambiguation)
