= List of ski resorts in the German Alps =

This is a list of ski resorts in the German Alps. Because the German part of the Alps lies exclusively in Bavaria, Alpine ski resorts are only found in that state. The mountains in Upper Bavaria are referred to as the Bavarian Alps; whilst those in the Bavarian province of Swabia are known as the Allgäu Alps.

== Ski resorts in the Allgäu Alps ==
Name of lift/area	Location(s)	Height above sea level in metres	Lift facilities^{1}	Piste length in km
Hindelang-Oberjoch	Oberjoch	1136 - 1559	0/1/7	32
Wertach	Wertach	890 - 1418	0/0/3	10
Oy-Mittelberg	Oy-Mittelberg		0/0/3	0.6
Bolsterlang	Bolsterlang		1/1/5	20
Ofterschwang	Ofterschwang		0/2/5	14.8
Obermaiselstein/Grasgehren	Obermaiselstein		0/1/4	10
Balderschwang	Balderschwang		0/2/10	32
Immenstadt	Immenstadt		0/2/10	20
Grünten	Rettenberg		0/1/13	40
Söllereck/Höllwies	Oberstdorf		1/0/3	10
Fellhorn/Kanzelwand	Oberstdorf	920 - 1957	2/4/7	20
Nebelhorn	Oberstdorf	828 - 2224	2/3/1	12
Halblech	Buching	823 - 1043	0/1/3	3
Tegelberg	Schwangau		1/0/4	5
Nesselwang	Nesselwang		0/2/3	11.5
Breitenberg	Pfronten	800 - 1675	1/1/10	12
Steibis	Steibis	865 - 1345	2/0/16	48
Hochgrat	Oberstaufen	856 - 1708	1/0/0	16 (0/12/4)
Oberstaufen	Oberstaufen	746 - 1170	0/1/11	25
Scheidegg	Scheidegg		0/0/4	3.0
Simmerberg	Weiler		0/0/4	1.3
Buchenberg	Buchenberg	800 - 1141	0/0/6	4
Isny	Isny		0/0/4	0.9

== Ski resorts in the Bavarian Alps (from west to east) ==
Name of lift/area	Location(s)	Height above sea level in metre	Lift facilities^{1}	Piste length^{2} in km
Kolben (Oberammergau)	Oberammergau	860 - 1276	0/1/7	18
Unterammergau	Unterammergau		0/0/5	6 (1/3/2)
Kohlgruber Hörnle	Bad Kohlgrub		0/1/4	12
Garmisch Classic	Garmisch-P.	740 - 2050	4/3/11	36.5 (6.5/24/6)
Wank	Garmisch-P.		1/0/4	9 (0.5/8.5/0)
Eckbauer	Garmisch-P.	800 - 1250	1/0/0	3 (2/1/0)
Zugspitze	Garmisch-P., Eibsee	2000 - 2720	3/1/9	18 (2/15/1)
Kranzberg	Mittenwald	980 - 1350	0/1/6	15,1 (5.6/8.4/1.1)
Blomberg	Bad Tölz	703 - 1236	0/1/1	8 (5/3/0)
Brauneck	Lenggries	695 - 1712	1/3/15	35 (6/25/4)
Hirschberg (Bavaria)	Kreuth	778 - 1191	0/0/3	2 (1/1/0)
Wallberg	Tegernsee	800 - 1900	1/0/1	9.3 (0/6.1/3.2)
Sutten	Tegernsee		1/0/0	3.5 (0/3.5/0)
Stümpfling	Spitzingsee	1100 - 1800	0/2/11	19.9 (11.9/3.5/4.5)
Taubenstein	Spitzingsee	1100 - 1900	1/0/5	10.5 (7/2/1.5)
Wendelstein	Bayrischzell	800 - 1700	2/0/2	10 (2/4/4)
Sudelfeld	Bayrischzell	800 - 1700	0/3/16	30 (4.5/21/4.5)
Hocheck	Oberaudorf	600 - 1300	0/1/4	12
Kampenwand	Aschau	650 - 1450	1/2/3	12 (7/4/1)
Reit im Winkl	Reit im Winkl	(695) 1200 - 1860	1/8/7	50 (20/25/5)
Winklmoos-Steinplatte	Winklmoos-Alm	1200 - 1860	1/8/3	50 (20/25/5)
Hochfelln	Bergen	650 - 1600	1/0/6	7 (1/5/1)
Unternberg	Ruhpolding		0/1/4	9 (2/7/0)
Hochschwarzeck	Ramsau bei Berchtesgaden	1020 - 1390	0/1/5	6 (3/3/0)
Götschen	Berchtesgaden	880 - 1280	0/1/2	5,3 (5,3/0/0)
Jenner	Berchtesgaden	1530 - 1800	1/2/3	8.5
Gutshof Obersalzberg	Berchtesgaden		0/0/6	2.6 (0/2.6/0)
Roßfeld	Berchtesgaden-Oberau		0/0/6	6 (5/1)

^{1}Gondolas/Chair lifts/Drag lifts; if only one figure is given, this is the total
^{2}total; in brackets: light/medium/difficult

== See also ==
- List of ski resorts in the German Central Uplands
