= Hahneberg =

Hahneberg may refer to:

- Hahneberg (Neusalza-Spremberg), a mountain of Saxony, Germany
- Hahneberg (Reinhardswald), a hill in Hesse, Germany
