= Blomberg (Bavarian Prealps) =

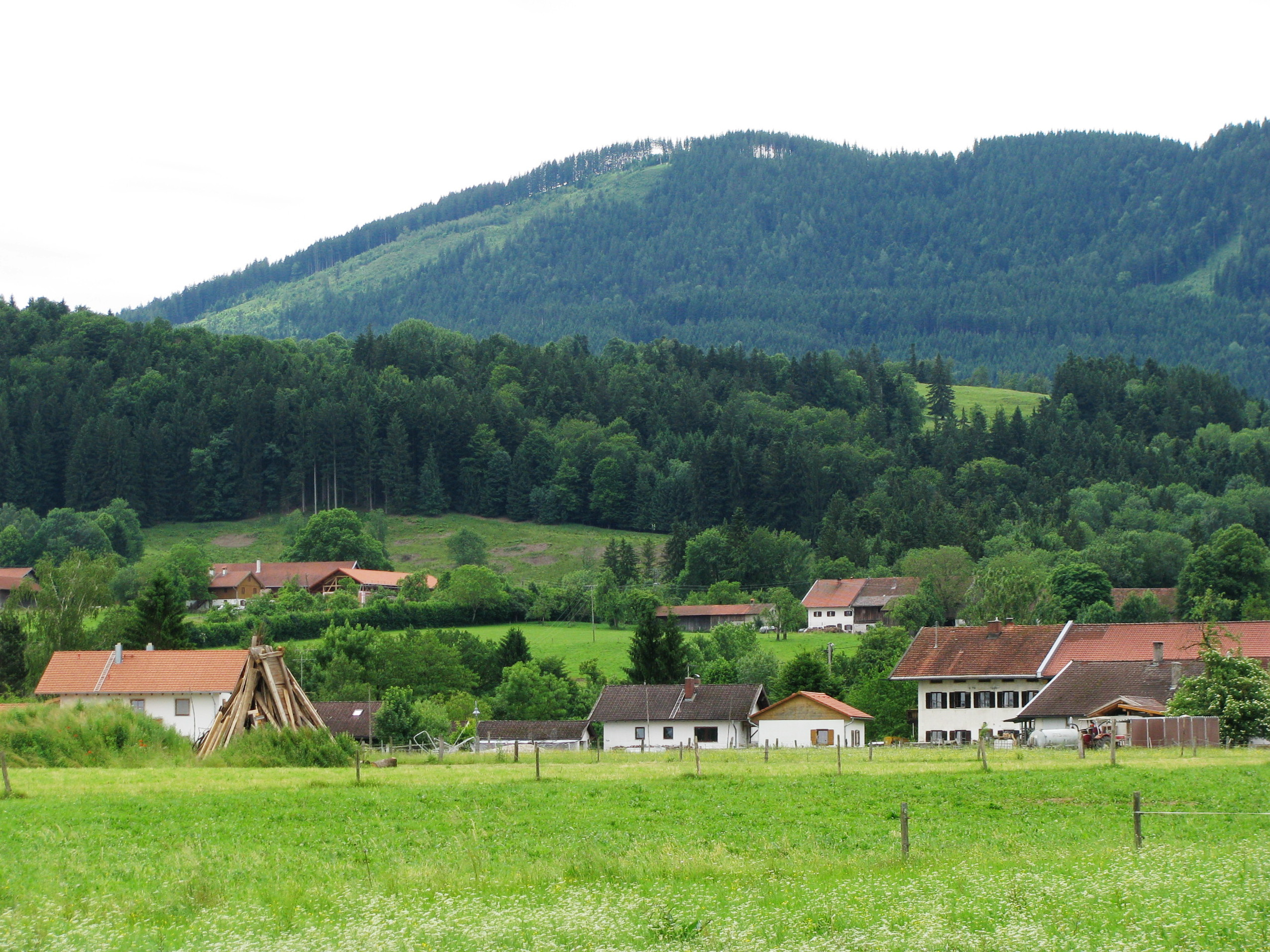
- The Blomberg from the north-northwest

Highest point
- Elevation: 1,248 m (4,094 ft)
- Coordinates: 47°43′59.54″N 11°29′29.81″E

Geography
- Location within Bavaria
- Location: Bavaria, Germany
- Parent range: Bavarian Prealps

Geology
- Rock type: Flysch

Climbing
- First ascent: unknown

The Blomberg is a mountain, 1,248 m high, in Bavaria, Germany and is the local mountain of Bad Tölz and a popular destination both with locals and visitors to the region. It is accessible on a short footpath which is steep in places or with the aid of a chairlift.

== Location and area ==
The Blomberg lies within the Bavarian Prealps in the parish of Wackersberg. At 1,203 m is a managed inn, the Blomberghaus. In addition there is a 1,286-metre-long summer rodelbahn and, since mid-2008, a ropes course.

Immediately to the south is a neighbouring peak, the 1,348 m high Zwiesel (also called the Zwieselberg). As close neighbours, the Blomberg and Zwiesel are often visited together. The nearby Heiglkopf is also easy to reach from the summit of the Blomberg. Both mountains may be climbed by children and are occasionally recommended as such.

During the Würm glaciation the alpentor of the Isar valley glacier was formed between the Blomberg and the Rechelkopf. It was here that the glacier broke through at a height of about 1,000 m above sea level (NN).

== Winter sports ==
In winter the small ski area with its old double chairlift and two drag lifts is used especially by day visitors from the surrounding area as far as Munich. The 5.5-km-long winter toboggan run, built in 1903, is popular and very busy at weekends.
