= Spitzingsee (village) =

Village in Bavaria, Germany

Coordinates: 47.66137°N 11.88741°E

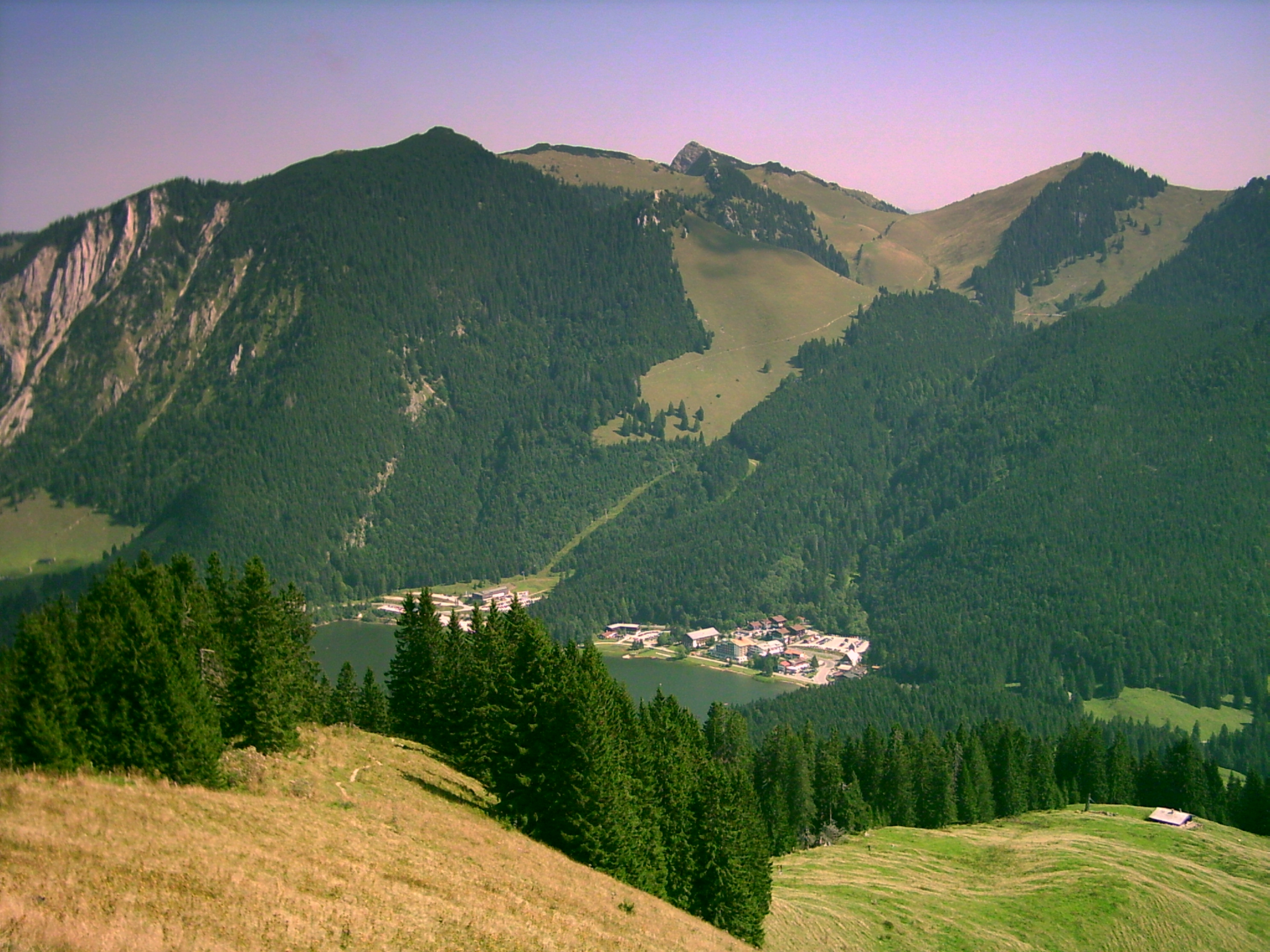
remote view (2003)

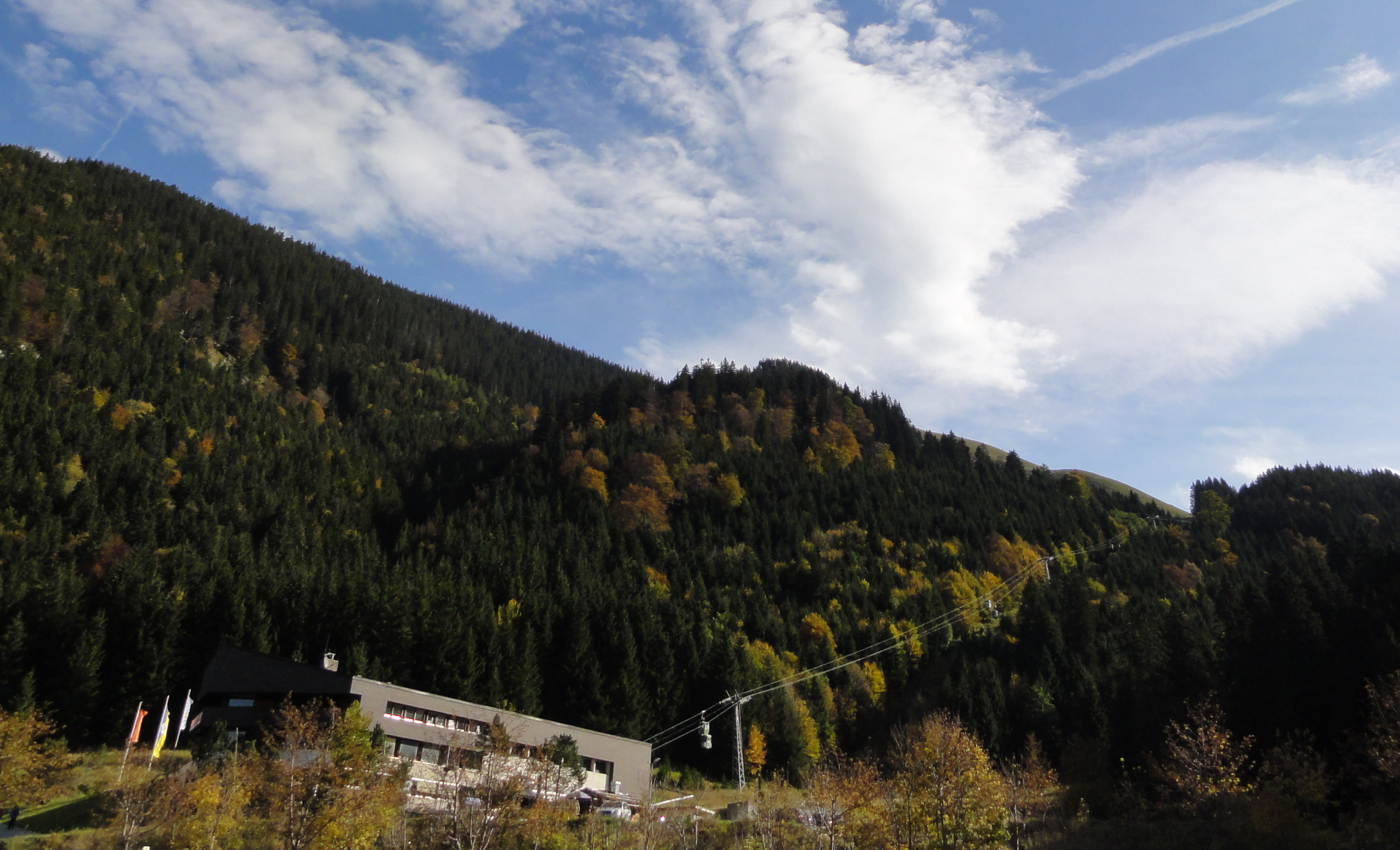
Taubensteinbahn (2014)

Spitzingsee [Ort] is a village (Kirchdorf) within Marktgemeinde Schliersee which is part of Landkreis Miesbach, Bavaria, Germany. The population amounts to 200 plus tourists.

The name derives from Lake Spitzingsee, and the human settlement is located at its eastern bank.

The nearest railway station is Fischhausen-Neuhaus in Neuhaus. The State Route No. St2077 connects the village by road. The main economic factor is tourism (all seasons). The village is a destination for hikers and mountainbikers in the summer seasons. In the winter season, it is a destination for skiers. The gondola lift Taubensteinbahn starts in this village and runs all year.

== See also ==
- List of ski resorts in the German Alps
