= List of ski resorts in the German Central Uplands =

This is a list of ski resorts in the German Central Uplands; it does not cover ski resorts in the German Alps.

Name of lift/area	Resorts	Location	State^{1}	Height (m above sea level)^{2}	Lifts^{3}	Length of pistes (in km)^{4}	Web page
Ostalb-Skilifte	Aalen	Swabian Jura	BW	530–680	2	2.2	Website
Skilift am Schloßberg	Albstadt-Tailfingen	Swabian Jura	BW	810–935	1	1.4	Website
Skilift Genkingen	Genkingen	Swabian Jura	BW		3	0.9	Website
Skilift Donnstetten	Römerstein	Swabian Jura	BW		4	0.4	Website
Skilifte Halde	Westerheim	Swabian Jura	BW	820	4	1.2	Website
Skilifte Wiesensteig	Wiesensteig	Swabian Jura	BW	640–755	3	5	Website
Achertal	Achertal; Seebach	Black Forest	BW		4		Website
Baiersbronn	Baiersbronn	Black Forest	BW	500–1000	9	4	Website
Gersbach	Gersbach	Black Forest	BW		1		Website
Belchenland	Schönau im Schwarzwald	Black Forest	BW	1106–1365	1	7	Website
Feldberg im Schwarzwald	Liftverbund Feldberg; Menzenschwand; St. Blasien	Black Forest	BW	750–1493	28	55	Website
Ferienland	Triberg; Schonach; Schönwald; Furtwangen; St. Georgen	Black Forest	BW				Website
Hotzenwald	Herrischried	Black Forest	BW				Website
Hinterzarten-Breitnau	Hinterzarten; Breitnau	Black Forest	BW				Website
Oberried	Oberried	Black Forest	BW				
Sasbachwalden		Black Forest	BW				Website
Todtmoos	Todtmoos	Black Forest	BW	800–1200	4		Website
Todtnauer Ferienland	Todtnau	Black Forest	BW		1		Website
Großer Arber	Bodenmais; Bayerisch Eisenstein	Bavarian Forest	BY	1050–1450	10	10	Website
Silberberg	Bodenmais	Bavarian Forest	BY	750–955	2	4	Website
Skizentrum Mitterdorf	Mitterfirmiansreut; Philippsreut	Bavarian Forest	BY	840–1139	6	4	Website
Predigtstuhl (Lower Bavaria)	Sankt Englmar; Markbuchen	Bavarian Forest	BY	850–1024	4	3	Website
Pröller	Sankt Englmar	Bavarian Forest	BY	708–1010	3	7	Website
Geißkopf	Unterbreitenau; Bischofsmais	Bavarian Forest	BY	840–1121	6	8	Website
Hohenbogen	Neukirchen b.Hl.Blut	Bavarian Forest	BY	657–1050	2	5	Website
Ski Eck	Arrach	Bavarian Forest	BY	843–1134	2	3.5	Website
Voithenberg Gibacht	Furth im Wald	Bavarian Forest	BY	612–881	3	4.6	Website
Ochsenkopf	Bischofsgrün; Fleckl	Fichtel Mountains	BY	645–1024	4	4.2	Website
Gehrenlift Bischofsgrün	Bischofsgrün	Fichtel Mountains	BY		1	0.6	Website
Großer Kornberg	Kirchenlamitz; Schönwald	Fichtel Mountains	BY	710–820	2	1.3	Website
Klausenlifte Mehlmeisel	Mehlmeisel	Fichtel Mountains	BY	615–815	3	1	Website
Bleaml Alm	Fichtelberg	Fichtel Mountains	BY	750–1024	1	0.4	Website
Geiersberg- & Hempelsberglift	Oberwarmensteinach	Fichtel Mountains	BY		3	1.95	Website
Skilift Arzberg	Arzberg	Fichtel Mountains	BY		1	0.5	Website
Skianlage Schloppach	Waldsassen	Fichtel Mountains	BY		2	0.8	Website
Skilift am Butzberg	Wunsiedel	Fichtel Mountains	BY		1	0.2	Website
Skilift Spies	Betzenstein	Franconian Jura	BY		1	0.3	Website
Skilift Burgbernheim	Burgbernheim	Franconian Jura	BY		3	0.8	Website
Skilifte Bergwiese	Schwarzenbach am Wald	Franconian Forest	BY	610–680	2	2	Website
Skilifte Tettau	Steinbach am Wald	Franconian Forest	BY		2	1.6	Website
Skizentrum Fahrenberg	Vohenstrauß	Upper Palatine Forest	BY	650–801	2	1.9	Website
Skilifte am Arnsberg	Bischofsheim a.d.Rhön	Rhön	BY	595–843	3	7.1	Website
Skigebiet Kreuzberg	Bischofsheim a.d.Rhön	Rhön	BY	610–928	4	15	Website
Feuerberg Skiwelt	Sandberg	Rhön	BY	832	4		Website
Skilift am Eichberg	Gröden	Schraden	BB		1		Website
Lahn-Dill-Bergland	Hartenrod; Eiershäuser Hang; Hohensolms; Kleingladenbach; Sackpfeife	Gladenbacher Bergland	HE	345–652	6	5	Website
Hoherodskopf	Schotten	Hoher Vogelsberg	HE	655–745	3	2.12	Website
SkiLifte Beerfelden	Beerfelden	Odenwald	HE	395–520	2	0.6	Website
Löhrbach/Schnorrenbach	Birkenau	Odenwald	HE	400–500	1	0.45	-
Neunkircher Höhe	Modautal	Odenwald	HE	470–530	1	0.4	-
Tromm	Grasellenbach	Odenwald	HE	460–520	0	0.6	Website
Skizentrum Simmelsberg	Gersfeld	Rhön	HE	660–840	3	6.1	Website
Ski- und Rodelarena Wasserkuppe	Poppenhausen	Rhön	HE	820–930	5	2.5	Website
Skilift Zuckerfeld	Gersfeld	Rhön	HE	650–950	1	4	Website
Winterpark Willingen	Willingen	Sauerland	HE	580–835	15	15	Website
Skilift Höllkopf	Driedorf	Westerwald	HE	640	1	0.3	Website
Ski-Ranch Driedorf-Roth	Driedorf	Westerwald	HE	500	2	0.3	Website
Harz	Clausthal-Zellerfeld; Hohegeiß; Osterode-Lerbach	Harz	NI		5	2	Website
Ski-Alpinum Schulenberg	Schulenberg	Harz	NI	480–645	2	3.25	Website
Torfhaus	Altenau	Harz	NI	740–820	2	0.4	Website
Ravensberg	Bad Sachsa	Harz	NI	480–660	3	4	Website
Bocksberg	Hahnenklee	Harz	NI	726	3	4.8	Website
Matthias-Schmidt-Berg	Sankt Andreasberg	Harz	NI	550–700	5	3.2	Website
Sonnenberg	Sankt Andreasberg	Harz	NI	538–853	3	2.6	Website
Wurmberg	Braunlage	Harz	NI	570–971	4	13	Website
Alpin-Center Wittgenstein	Hesselbach	Rothaar Mountains	NRW		1	2	Website
Postwiesen-Skigebiet	Neuastenberg	Rothaar Mountains	NRW	610–730	8	8	Website
Skiliftkarussell Winterberg	Winterberg	Rothaar Mountains	NRW	670–830	21	15	Website
Snow World Züschen	Züschen	Rothaar Mountains	NRW	620–816	6		Website
Wildewiese	Wildewiese	Sauerland	NRW	540–645	5		Website
Schwarzer Mann	Schnee Eifel	Eifel	RLP	697	2	1.7	Website
Wolfsschlucht	Schnee Eifel	Eifel	RLP	570	1	0.5	Website
Skilift Dollberg	Hermeskeil	Hunsrück	RLP	683	1	0.31	Website
Erbeskopf	Thalfang	Hunsrück	RLP	818	3	2	Website
Idarkopf	Stipshausen	Hunsrück	RLP	746	2	1.1	Website
Skilift Peterberg	Nonnweiler	Hunsrück	SL	584	1	0.38	Website
Skilift Rugiswalde	Rugiswalde	Elbe Sandstone Mountains	SN		1	1.3	Website
Skilifte Sebnitz	Sebnitz	Elbe Sandstone Mountains	SN		3	1.8	Website
Skilifte Altenberg & Geising	Altenberg; Geising	Ore Mountains	SN	850-905	4	6.5	Website
Rost's Wiesen	Augustusburg	Ore Mountains	SN	300–470	4	0.4	Website
Skilift Carlsfeld	Carlsfeld	Ore Mountains	SN	850–950	2	0.4	Website
Skilift am Schießberg	Crottendorf	Ore Mountains	SN	697–790	1	1.1	Website
Skiarena Eibenstock	Eibenstock	Ore Mountains	SN	650–780	4	0.6	Website
Skigebiet Holzhau	Holzhau	Ore Mountains	SN	610–780	4	1.6	Website
Fichtelberg	Oberwiesenthal	Ore Mountains	SN	900–1215	7	15	Website
Kegelberg	Erlbach	Vogtland	SN	580–740	2	1.6	Website
Skiwelt Schöneck	Schöneck/Vogtl.	Vogtland	SN	700–800	6	1.8	Website
Lausche	Waltersdorf	Zittau Hills	SN	490–793	4	2.9	Website
Skilifte Gehlberg	Gehlberg	Thuringian Forest	TH	940	3		Website
Oberhof	Oberhof	Thuringian Forest	TH	830–900	4	1.3	Website
Skiarena Silbersattel	Steinach	Thuringian Forest	TH	590–840	4	4.7	Website
Skilift am Knüllfeld	Steinbach-Hallenberg	Thuringian Forest	TH	560–680	1	0.7	Website
Großer Inselsberg	Bad Tabarz	Thuringian Forest	TH	420–900	2	2.2	Website

Notes:

- ^{1} State = Federal state (abbreviations based on ISO 3166-2:DE)
- ^{2} Height of the ski resort in metres above sea level
- ^{3} Lifts = Number of lifts (gondolas / chair lifts / drag lifts)
- ^{4} Pistes = Ski piste length in kilometres

== See also ==
- List of ski resorts in the German Alps
