= Kramerspitz =

Mountain in Bavaria, Germany

Coordinates: 47°30′N 11°03′E

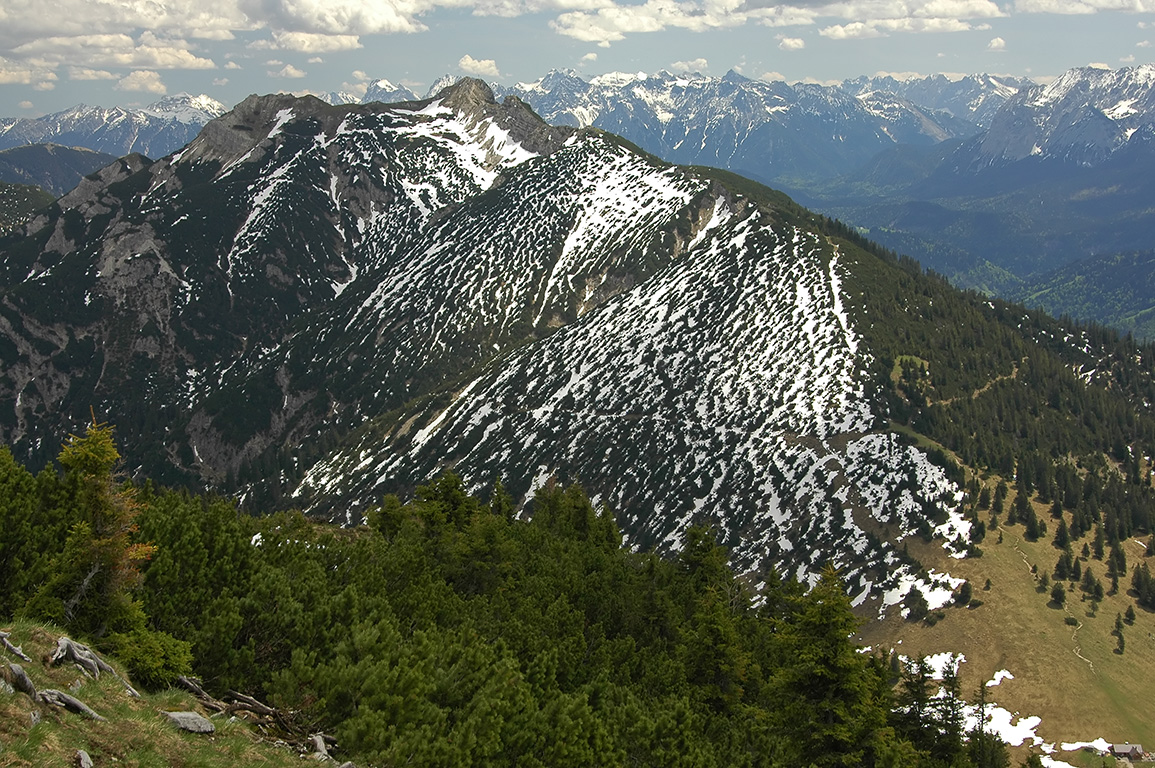

Highest point
- Elevation: 1,985 m (6,512 ft)
- Prominence: 776 m (2,546 ft)

Geography
- Location: Bavaria, Germany

Kramerspitz (or The Kramer) is a mountain overlooking the Garmisch side of Garmisch-Partenkirchen in Bavaria, Germany. It forms the most visible western boundary of the Loisach River Valley. It stands across the valley from the Wank to the east on the Partenkirchen side.

== Normal climbing route ==
Kramerspitz can be climbed directly from Garmisch-Partenkirchen in 4 hours, but a round trip will take closer to eight. The access is from the east side. At the altitude of 1028 m, you will pass St. Martin hut, and from there just continue through the woods generally in the west direction. You do not need any special equipment, any hiking shoes or boots will be good enough.
