= Kranzhorn =

Mountain on the Austrian-German border

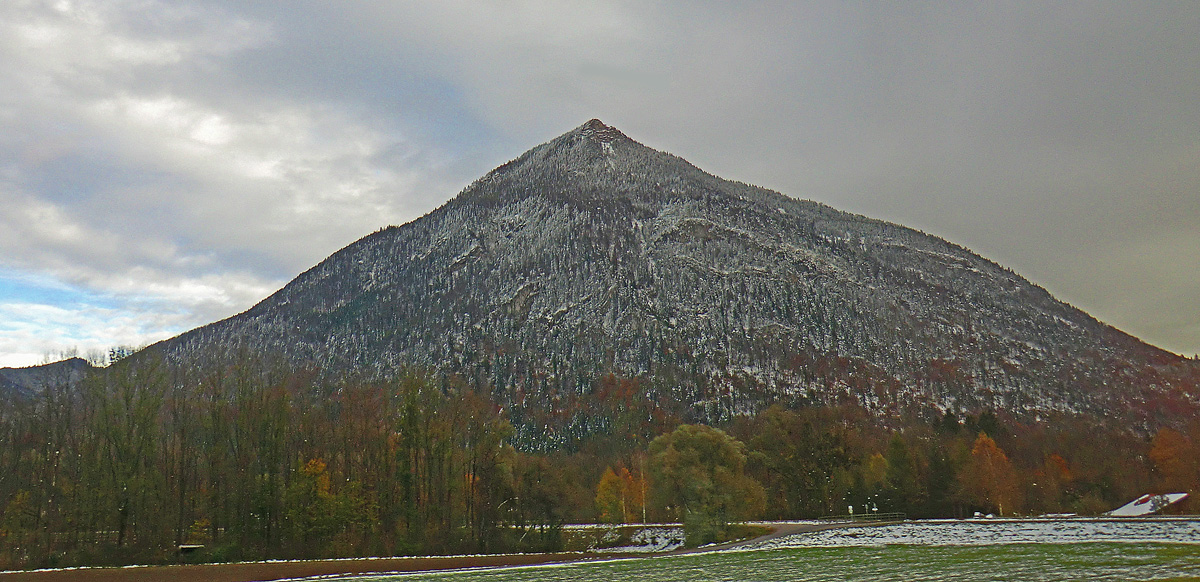
- Kranzhorn seen from the north west

Highest point
- Elevation: 1,366 m (4,482 ft)
- Coordinates: 47°42′5″N 12°11′5″E

Geography
- Location: Tirol, Austria, Bavaria, Germany

Kranzhorn is a 1,368 m (4,368 ft) mountain in Tirol, Austria and Bavaria, Germany. It lies on the western edge of the Chiemgau Alps. The German-Austrian border between Bavaria and Tyrol runs across its summit. The Kranzhorn and the opposite Wildbarren formed the Alpine gateway of the Inn Valley Glacier during the Würm glaciation. On the German side, the mountain belongs to the municipality of Nußdorf am Inn in the Rosenheim district, and on the Austrian side, to the municipality of Erl in the Kufstein district.

Since 1504, the Bavarian-Austrian border has run through the center of the summit plateau. The border was finally established in 1670, and some of the boundary stones can still be found next to the hiking trails. The summit of the mountain therefore bears two summit crosses and is visible from far across the Inn Valley. From the summit, there are good views of Wendelstein to the west and the Kaiser Mountains to the south. Along with the Hochries and the Heuberg, Kranzhorn is one of the most popular destinations for hikers in the Chiemgau Alps. The shortest and most frequently used ascent is from the Erlerberg via the Bubenau and the Kranzhornalm. Other marked hiking trails lead from Erl over the steep Erlersteig and from Windshausen to the summit.

== Gallery ==
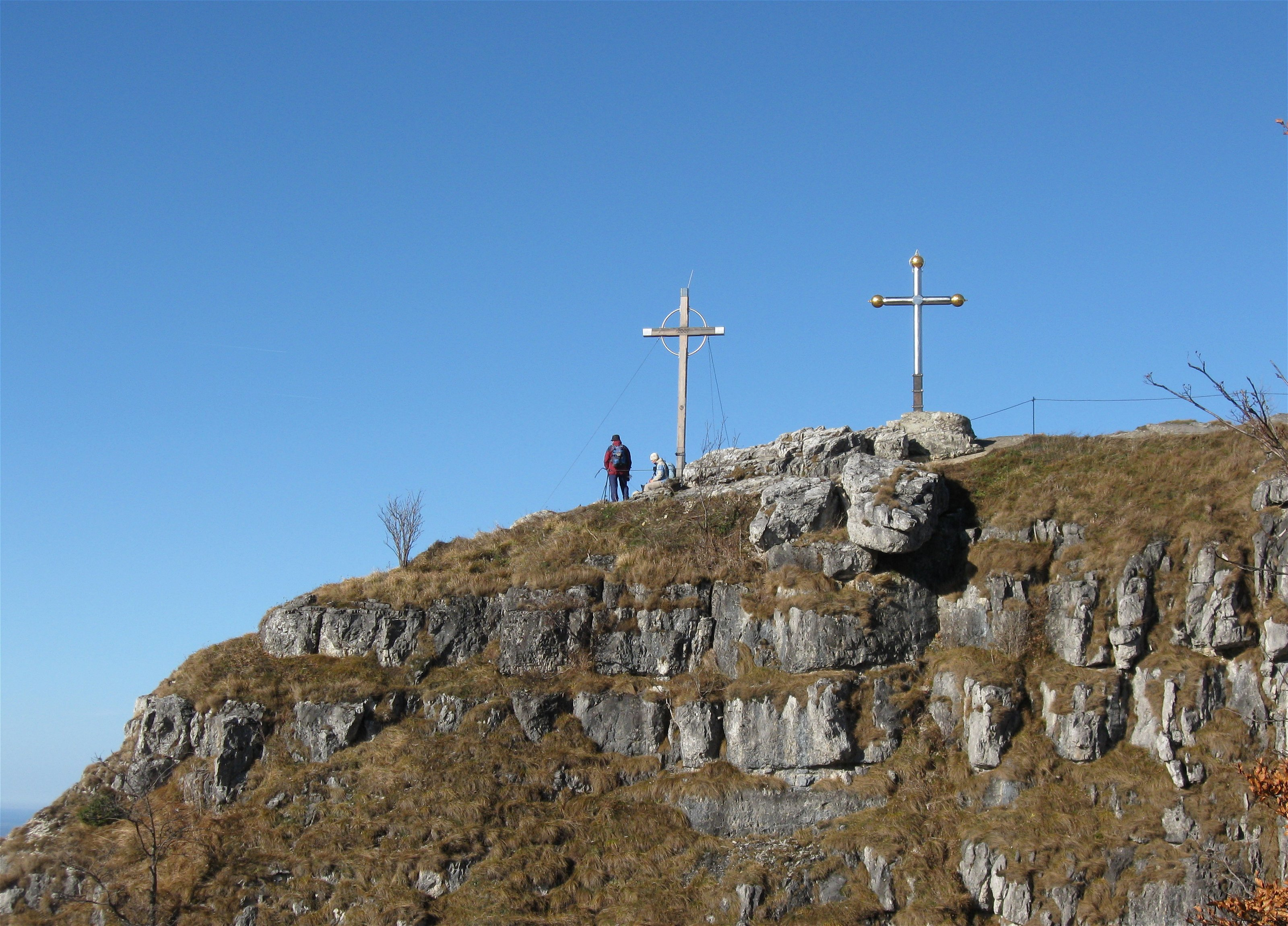
Two Christian crosses on the summit.

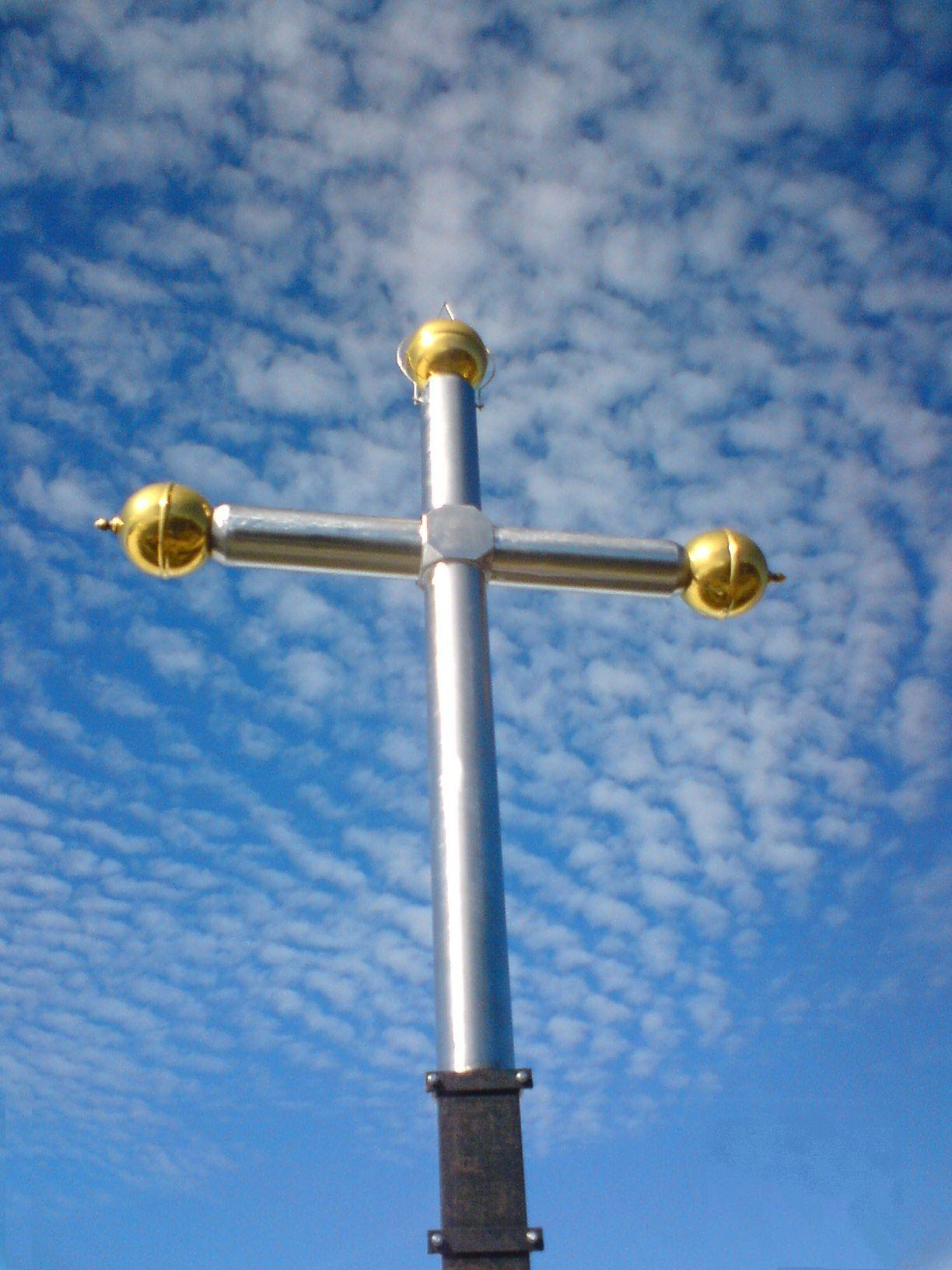
The cross on the Bavarian summit.

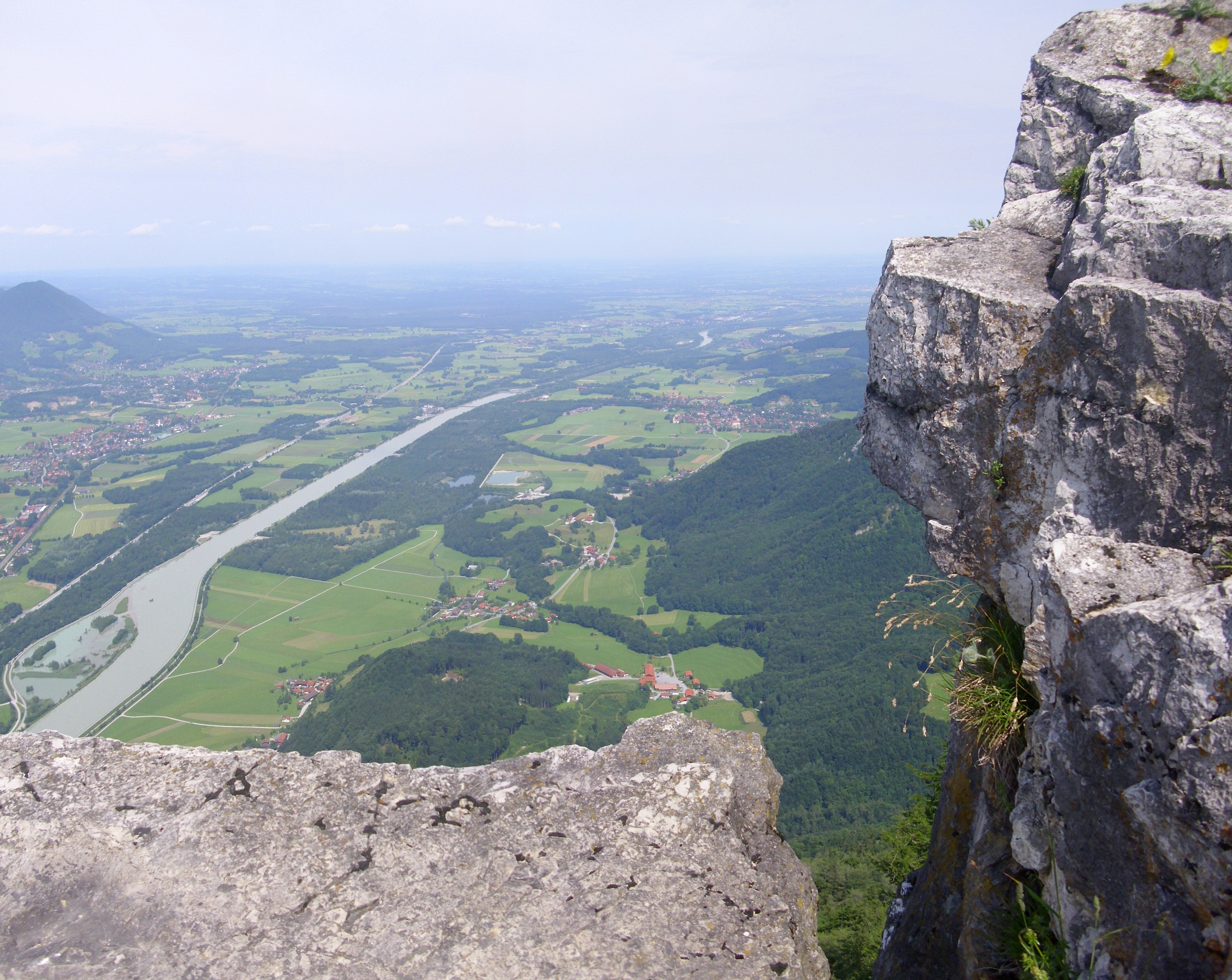
View from the summit of the Kranzhorn mountain over the Inn Valley to the north.

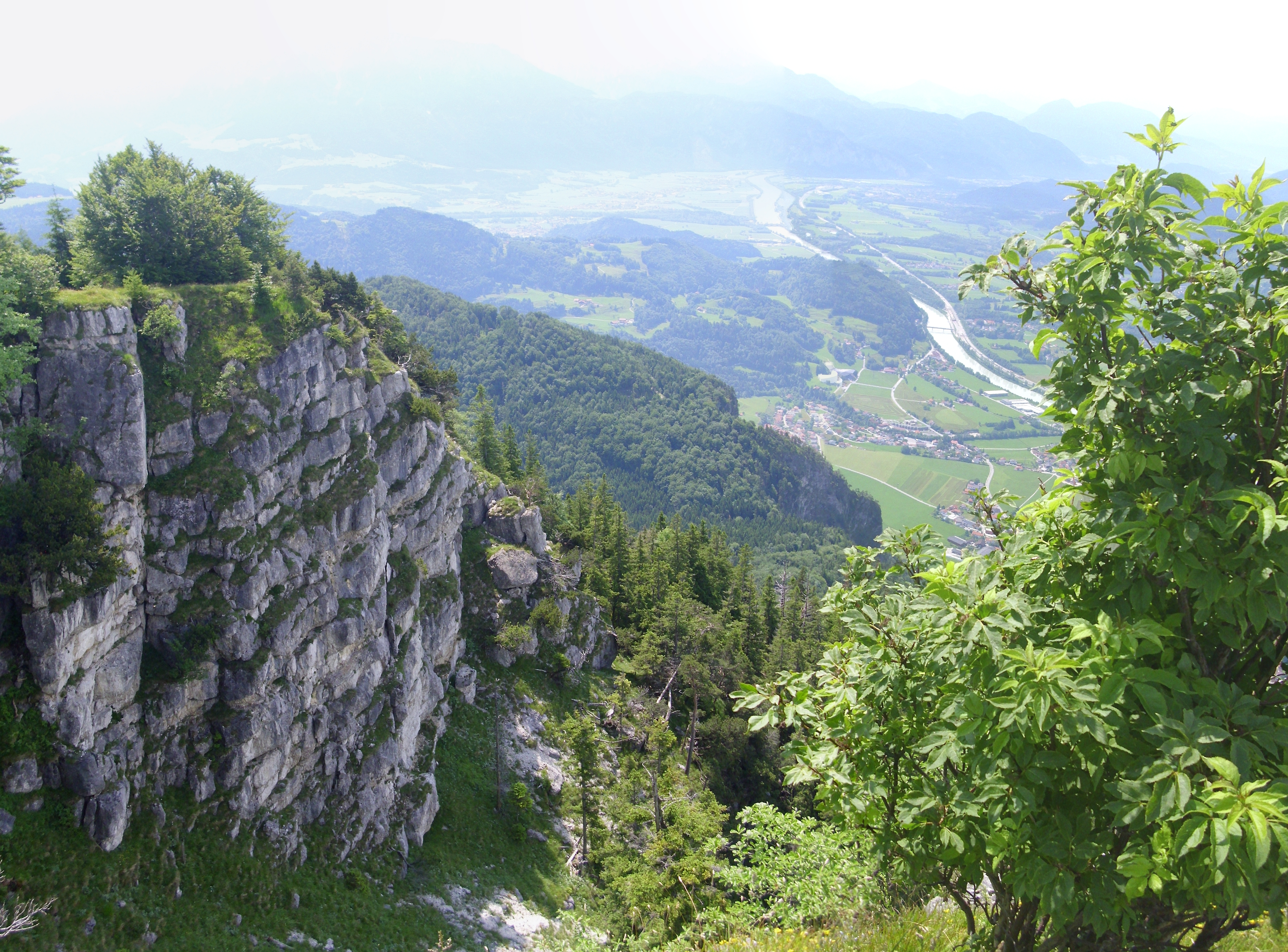
View from the summit of the Kranzhorn over the Inn Valley to the south.

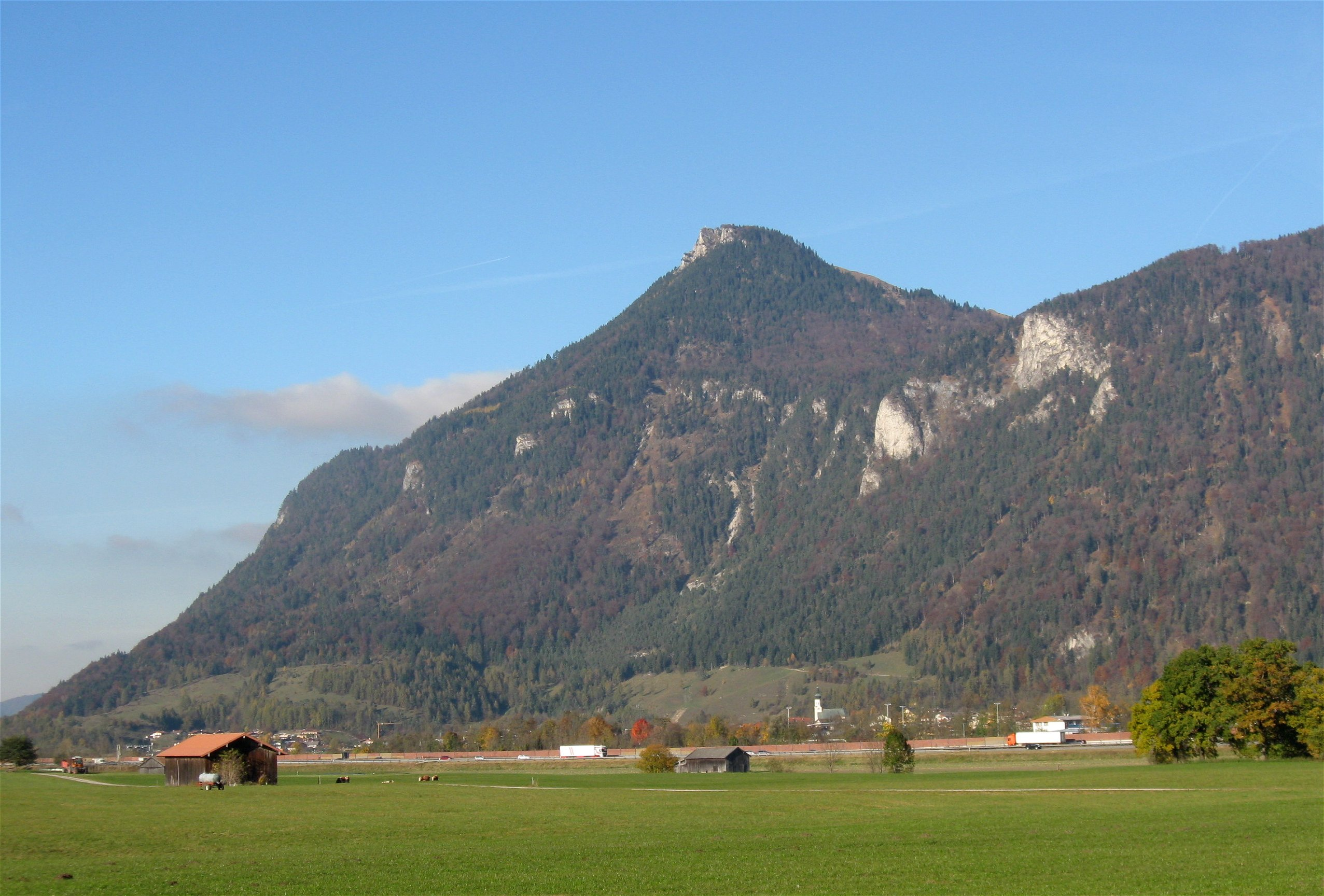
Kranzhorn, seen from Reisach, Oberaudorf. In the background there is Erl, Tyrol.
