= Heiglkopf =

Mountain in Germany

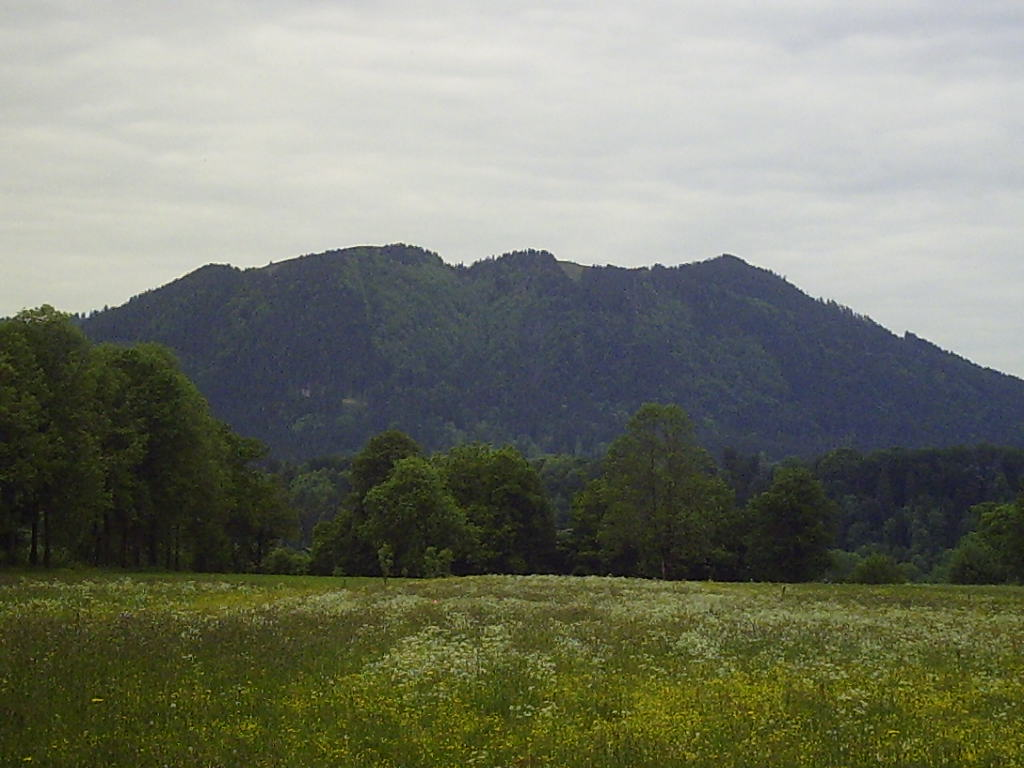

Highest point
- Elevation: 1,218 m (3,996 ft)
- Coordinates: 47°44′01″N 11°30′24″E

Geography
- Location within Germany
- Location: Upper Bavaria, Germany
- Parent range: Bavarian Alps

Heiglkopf, also spelled Heigelkopf, (1218 m) is a mountain near the village of Wackersberg in Upper Bavaria, Germany, close to the Austrian border. Between 1933 and 1945 it was known as Hitler-Berg.

In April 1933, the title of honorary citizen of Wackersberg was awarded by the municipal council to Adolf Hitler, Chancellor of Germany, and the mountain was renamed to his honor. A 10-metre-high black iron swastika, illuminated at night by torches, was erected at the top in June 1933. After the defeat of Germany in 1945 the swastika was destroyed and the former name restored.

== Sources ==
- Meyer, Ulrich (7 March 2007). "Probleme mit dem Hitler-Berg" (in German). Der Spiegel.
