= Puchberg =

Puchberg may refer to:

- Puchberg am Schneeberg, a village in Lower Austria
- Michael von Puchberg (1741–1822, Vienna), Austrian textile merchant

== See also ==
- Buchberg (disambiguation)
