= Hocheck (Oberaudorf) =

Mountain in Bavaria, Germany

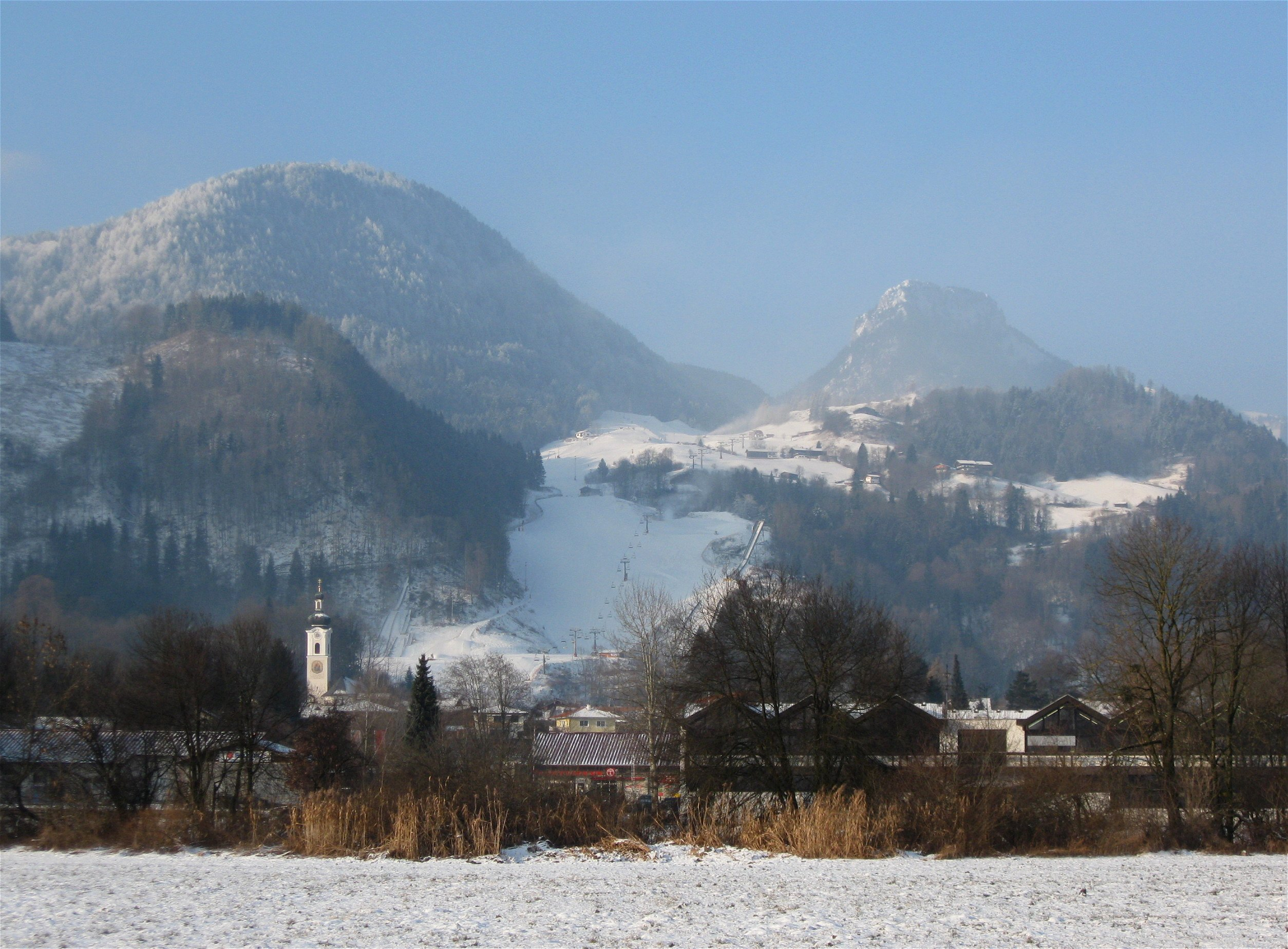

Highest point
- Elevation: 860 m (2,820 ft)
- Coordinates: 47°38′49″N 12°9′33″E

Geography
- Location: District of Rosenheim, Bavaria, Germany
- Parent range: Mangfall Mountains

Hocheck is a mountain in the district of Rosenheim, Bavaria, Germany. It is closely associated with the nearby town of Oberaudorf.

The mountain is about 860 metres high. The summit can be reached in about 50 minutes by foot or in about 10 minutes by cable car from Oberaudorf. From the top there is a view of Kranzhorn and Spitzstein. The cable car station is accessible by car, approximately a five-minute drive from the motorway exit for Oberaudorf. The mountain hosts a resort that has been renovated in the last 10 years with a new 4-chair lift, an illuminated night ski-slope, and a modern snowmaking system. The resort also has the world's only summer toboggan run with a 360-degree loop.

The Hocheck cable car is a 1450 metres long with an altitude increase of 310 metres, and its station is installed on 16 columns and was built in five months in 2002.
