= Sonneberg (hill) =

- Location within Saxony

Highest point
- Elevation: 401 m above sea level (NN) (1,315.6 ft)
- Coordinates: 51°01′24″N 14°30′03″E

Geography
- Location: Saxony, Germany (Görlitz district)
- Parent range: Upper Lusatian Highlands

Geology
- Mountain type: Lusatian Granodiorite

The Sonneberg (Upper Sorbian: Sónaberg), also called the Buchberg, is a hill in the Lusatian Highlands of eastern Germany with a height of 401.0 m above sea level (NN). It is the fourth highest hill in the borough of Neusalza-Spremberg in Saxony, after the Fuchsberg (422 m) and Hahneberg (410 m) and an unnamed peak about 600 metres north of the Sonneberg (403.2 m).

== Location and name ==
The Sonneberg lies about 500 metres southwest of the village of the same name in a forested area near the Czech border that is also called the Grenzwald ("border forest"). The new settlers of the village of Spremberg probably called the hill the Sonnebereg or Berg der Sonne ("hill of the sun"), because the sun in this neck of the woods went down late in the day over the treetops in the west. Its alternative name of Buchberg is derived from Buche ("beech tree") because beeches are the dominant species in the forest to this day. Formerly the hill was also called the Wauersberg after its owner, Wauer, a Sonneberg farmer. On old maps it is already called the Sonneberg, after which the village that emerged in 1800 was named and which has since become the present-day town of Neusalza-Spremberg.

== Geology and geography ==
The Sonneberg is one of the highest elevations in the aforementioned 15 hectare woodland. The densely forested hill has a flattened summit on which individual blocks of granodiorite lie. Its peak is formed of nepheline basalt and is thus a geological feature in the Neusalza-Spremberg region. An old quarry on the higher elevation to the north on the northeastern slopes clearly shows the columns of nepheline basalt that were formed as the lava solidified. These emerged millions of years ago in the geological formations of the Tertiary period and record that volcanic processes took place here. The deep quarry, which is filled with water, resembles a crater lake.

The Sonneberg towers like a spur over the village of Sonneberg in the western valley hollo of the borough – formerly Spremberger Niederdorf - which is crossed by the Dresden-Zittau railway line. In a western direction the forest of the Sonneberg transitions seamlessly into the woods that once belonged to the Czech village of Fugau that no longer exists. In pre-Reformation times this woodland was also called the Spremberg Forest (Spremberger Wald). On the loam soils of the Sonneberg foothills the ground is waterlogged in places. Several streams collect together here into the so-called Sonnebergwasser, also called the Teichflössel, which feeds several fish ponds at Neuspremberg as well as the forest swimming pool of the town. A field track from the western side of Neusalza-Spremberg leads over a railway bridge and adjacent pastureland to the Sonneberg.

== Politics ==
On June 25, 2023, Sonneberg made headlines for having elected a far right extremist politician of the AfD party to the position of district administrator (Landrat).

== Sources ==
- Walter Heinich: Spremberg. Versuch zu einer Ortsgeschichte des Kirchdorfes Spremberg in der sächsischen Oberlausitz. Schirgiswalde/Spremberg 1918.
- Lutz Mohr: Historischer Abriss der Stadt Neusalza-Spremberg in der Oberlausitz. Von den Anfängen bis zum Beginn des 20. Jahrhunderts. Greifswald u. Neusalza-Spremberg 1976/77 (manuscript, copy).
- Zwischen Strohmberg, Czorneboh und Kottmar. Edition no. 1 Akademie-Verlag Berlin, Berlin 1974 (Werte unserer Heimat. Vol. 24).
