= Sankt Englmar =

- Municipality
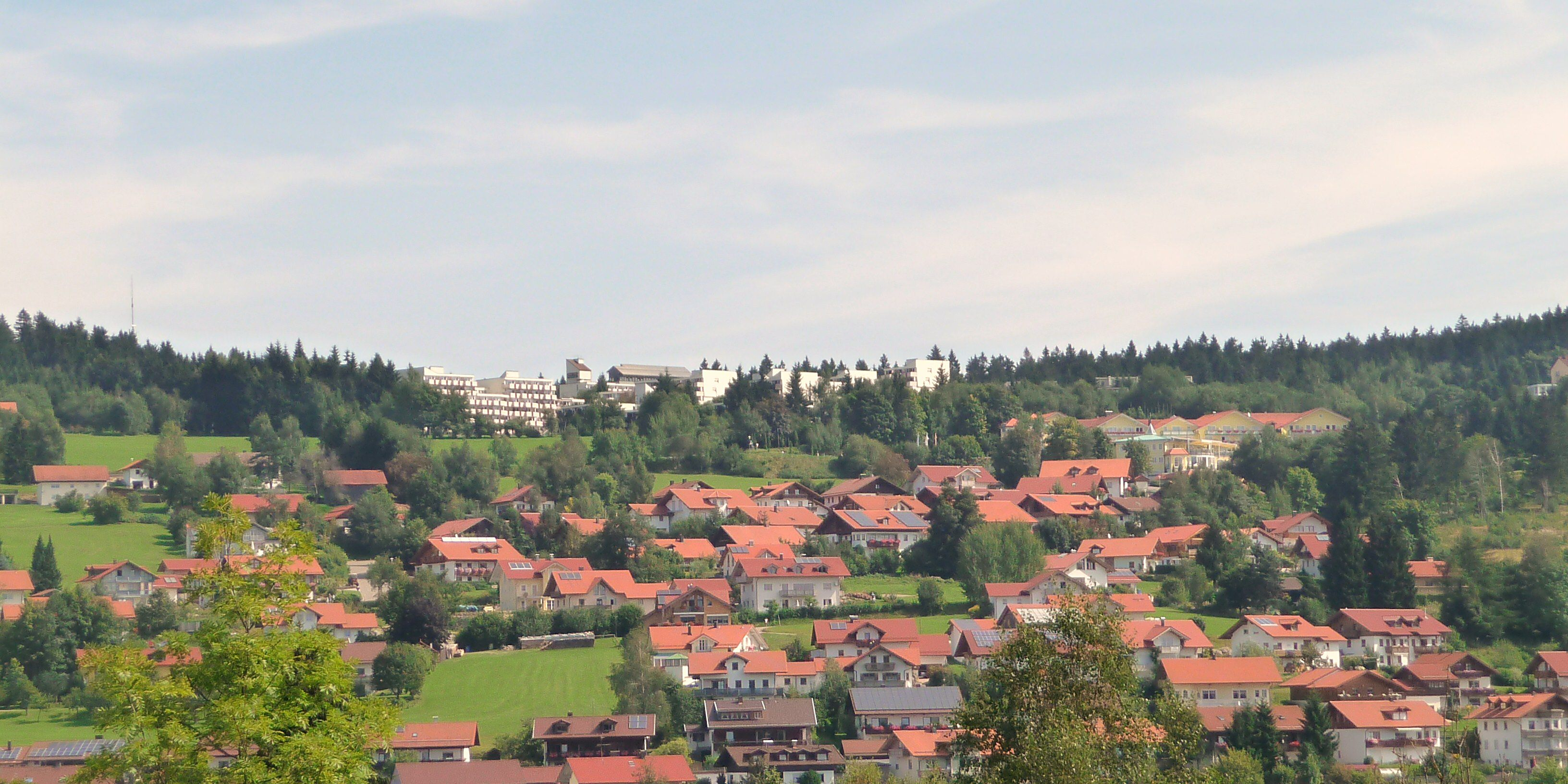
- Sankt Englmar

- Coat of arms

- Location of Sankt Englmar within Straubing-Bogen district
- Interactive map of Sankt Englmar
- Location within Germany Location within Bavaria
- Coordinates: 49°0′N 12°49′E
- Country: Germany
- State: Bavaria
- Admin. region: Niederbayern
- District: Straubing-Bogen

Government
  - Mayor (2020–26): Anton Piermeier (CSU)

Area
  - Total: 36.86 km^{2} (14.23 sq mi)
- Elevation: 808 m (2,651 ft)

Population (2025-12-31)
  - Total: 1,847
  - Density: 50.11/km^{2} (129.8/sq mi)
- Time zone: UTC+01:00 (CET)
  - Summer (DST): UTC+02:00 (CEST)
- Postal codes: 94379
- Dialling codes: 09965
- Vehicle registration: SR
- Website: gemeinde.sankt-englmar.de

Sankt Englmar (German pronunciation: [zaŋkt ˈʔɛŋl̩maʁ]) is a municipality in the district of Straubing-Bogen in Bavaria, Germany.

== History ==
Sankt Englmar was named after the hermit named Engelmarus, who was born in 1060 in Lüftlhof, Passau. He was highly esteemed for holiness and wisdom and lived during the 11th century in a wood near Passau, a Bavarian city that stretched out like the bow of a ship on the V-shaped confluence of the Inn and the Danube. At the point where the two large rivers meet in the town, a third river, the Ilz, flows into those waters. In Passau - in whose Gothic cathedral there is one of the largest organs in the world, full of 17,000 pipes that are played every Sunday morning in a public concert - to the left of the Danube, on an outcrop dominating the city, the Oberhaus fortress (18th century), residence of the bishops, still stands. Engelmaro was born in Bavaria to a poor peasant family. Prone to pity and living a solitary life, he could have as a master of the spirit a pious Armenian hermit, named Gregorio, an ex-bishop eager for solitude and perfection, who had retired to the Bavarian forest to prepare for death. After Gregorio died in 1093, Engelmaro remained alone in his hermitage, near the small center of Windberg, leading a life of work, austerity and prayer. The inhabitants of the region continued to visit him, to ask for advice and comfort, as they did when the bishop was still alive. Soon the hermit saint was surrounded by the esteem and affection of all; but the great veneration of which he became the object and his own virtues aroused the envy of a man who for some time had subtly associated with him, making believe that he wanted to lead under his guidance that hard existence, and that on the night between 13 and 14 January 1100 killed him barbarously, hiding his body under the snow and immediately leaving the country. According to another tradition, that wretch killed Engelmaro to take possession of the treasures he supposed he had: but he found nothing, since the good hermit distributed all the offerings he received to the poor. The fact is that that horrible action was discovered only a few months later, when the snow and the remains of the hermit melted, they reappeared and were noticed by a priest, who arranged to bury them. Legend has it that a beam of light radiated from the dead man's body. In 1331 the Premonstratensians of Windberg transported the remains of Engelmaro to their church, where the saint's tomb is still a pilgrimage destination. Every year the inhabitants of the village of Saint-Englmar still practice an ancient custom, called "In search of Engelmaro", pretending to go in search of the body of the saint hidden by the murderer: an image of the saint is hidden in the woods once found, it is brought back to town with a solemn procession. Sankt Englmar is named for him. Saint Engelmaro is a patron saint of good weather.
