= Buchberg (Fichtel Mountains) =

- Location within Bavaria

Highest point
- Elevation: 674 m (2,211 ft)
- Coordinates: 50°06′53″N 11°56′11″E

Geography
- Location: Bavaria, Germany
- Parent range: Fichtel Mountains

Geology
- Mountain type: porphyritic granite

The Buchberg (German pronunciation: [ˈbuːxˌbɛʁk]) is a 674-metre-high mountain in the Bavarian Fichtel Mountains.

The mountain, which is formed from porphyritic granite, lies south of the village of Reicholdsgrün, in the borough of Kirchenlamitz in the district of Wunsiedel im Fichtelgebirge.

The Buchberg is cloaked by a forest, 23 hectares in area, which is one of the few near-natural stands of deciduous forest in the Fichtel Mountains (woodrush beech forest). As a result, the area has been a protected natural monument since 1938 and is also a designated Natura 2000 region.

On the north side of the granite rock face is a memorial tablet to Arthur Münch, who held the post of gamekeeper and forest manager for decades.

== Sources ==
- Dietmar Herrmann: Lexikon Fichtelgebirge, Hof 2000, p. 95
- Rudolf Thiem: Gedenktafel Dr. Münch. In: Der Siebenstern 2006, p. 138
- Willi Fischer: Ein Juwel der Natur. In the Frankenpost Hof dated 11 February 2011
