= Buchberg (Upper Palatinate) =

- Location within Bavaria

Highest point
- Elevation: 591 m (1,939 ft)
- Coordinates: 49°14′27″N 11°25′54″E

Geography
- Location: Bavaria, Germany

Buchberg (German pronunciation: [ˈbuːxˌbɛʁk]) is a mountain of Bavaria, Germany.
