= Hahneberg (Reinhardswald) =

Hill in Hesse, Germany

Coordinates: 51°34′32″N 9°33′24″E

Highest point
- Elevation: 460.8 m (1,512 ft)

Geography
- Location: Hesse, Germany

Hahneberg is a hill in Hesse, Germany.
