= Hochfelln =

Mountain of Bavaria, Germany

Coordinates: 47°46′N 12°33′E

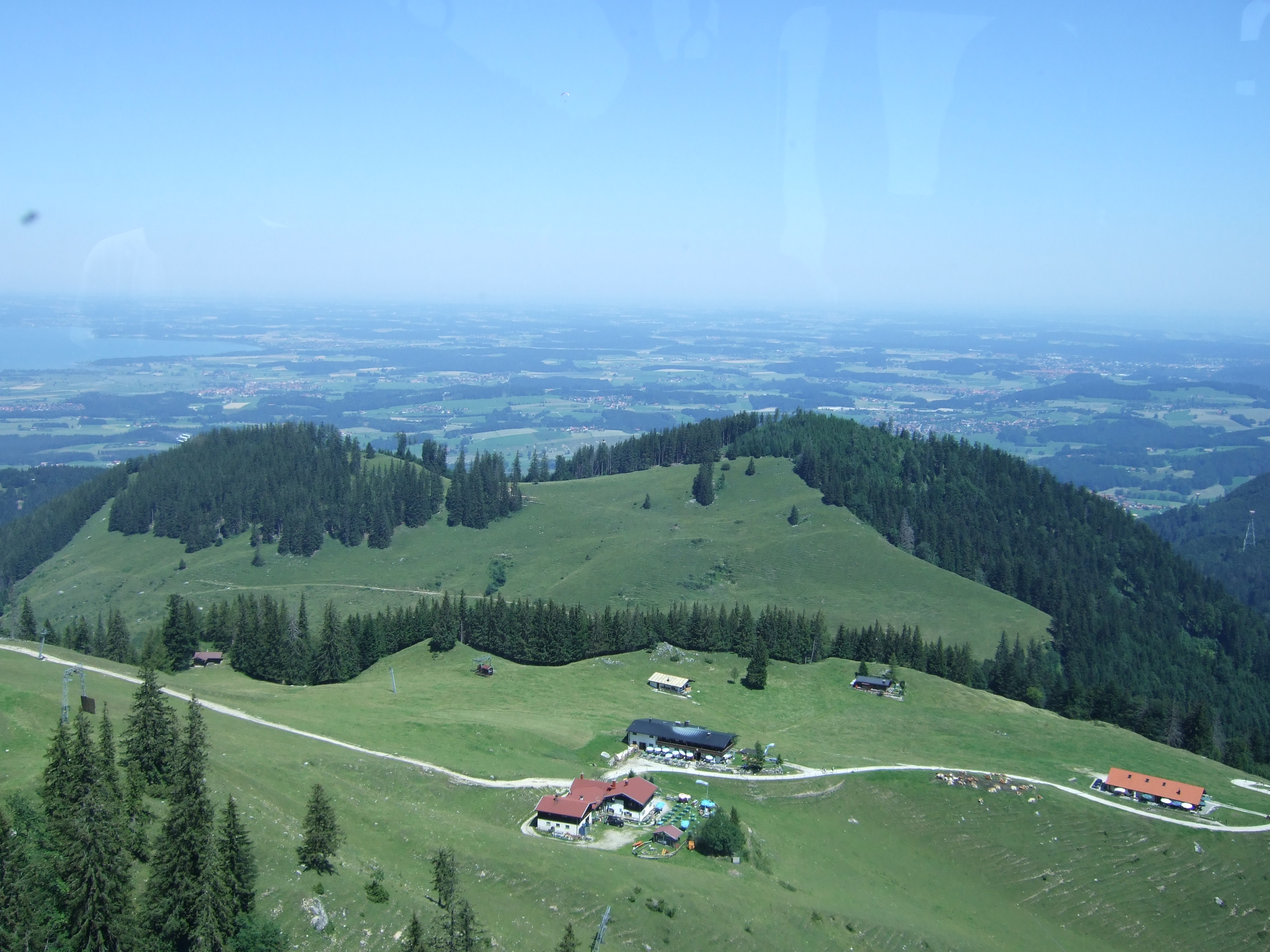
- Hochfelln landscape

Highest point
- Elevation: 1,674 m (5,492 ft)

Geography
- Location: Bavaria, Germany

Hochfelln is a mountain of Bavaria, Germany located in the Chiemgau Alps. Its summit is 1,674 meters high. Hochfelln overlooks the lake Chiemsee.

Hochfelln includes an area of Early Jurassic calcareous called the Hochfelln Beds, which has a substantial amount of silicified Early Jurassic gastropod fauna -- among the most diverse such assemblages in the Northern Calcareous Alps and Germany. The area also has rock deposits from the late Triassic to Cretaceous eras.
