= Nußdorf am Inn =

- Municipality
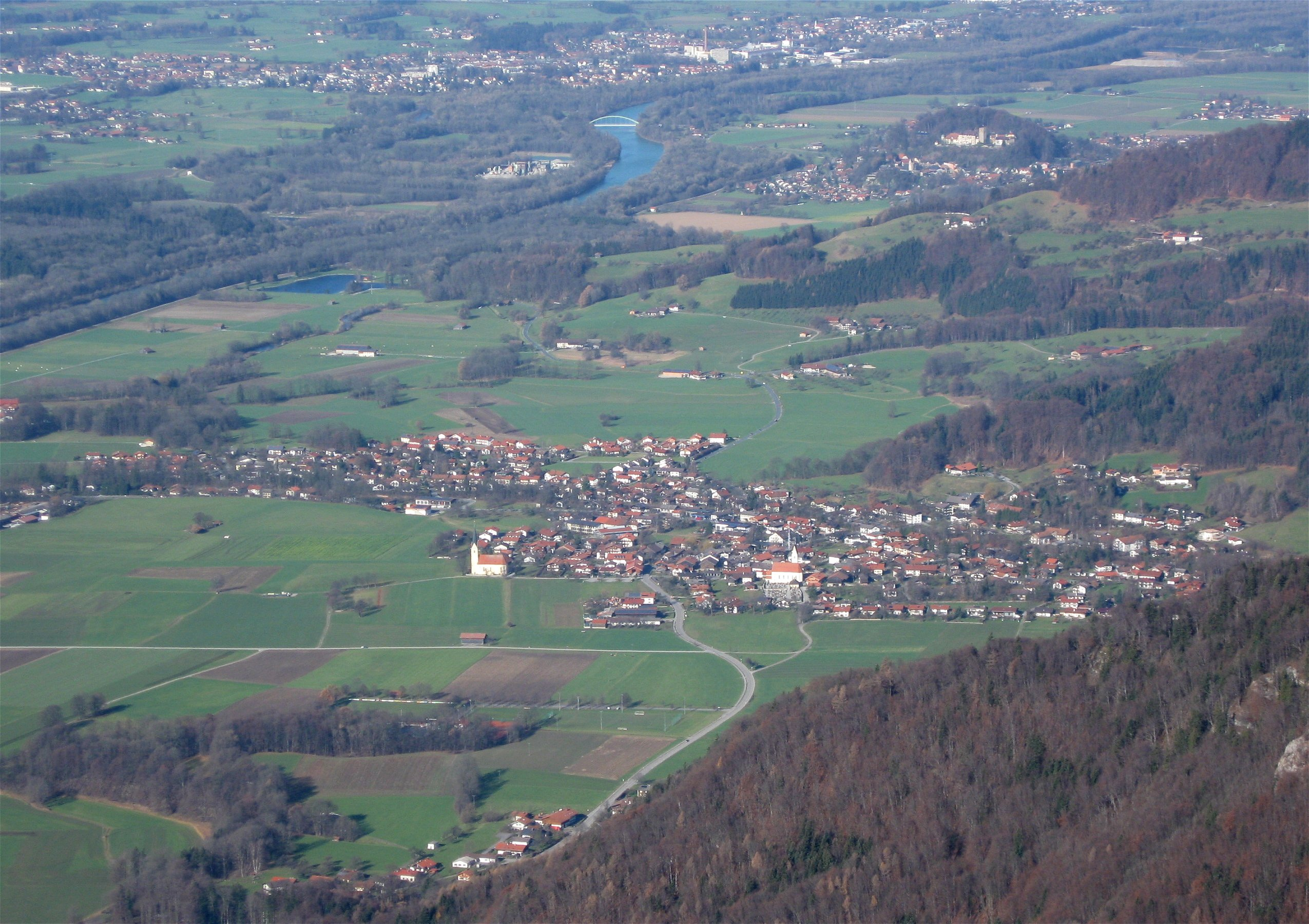
- Nußdorf am Inn seen from Kranzhorn

- Coat of arms

- Location of Nußdorf am Inn within Rosenheim district
- Interactive map of Nußdorf am Inn
- Location within Germany Location within Bavaria
- Coordinates: 47°44′N 12°9′E
- Country: Germany
- State: Bavaria
- Admin. region: Oberbayern
- District: Rosenheim

Government
  - Mayor (2021–27): Susanne Grandauer

Area
  - Total: 28.61 km^{2} (11.05 sq mi)
- Elevation: 465 m (1,526 ft)

Population (2025-12-31)
  - Total: 2,545
  - Density: 88.95/km^{2} (230.4/sq mi)
- Time zone: UTC+01:00 (CET)
  - Summer (DST): UTC+02:00 (CEST)
- Postal codes: 83131
- Dialling codes: 08034
- Vehicle registration: RO
- Website: www.nussdorf.de

Nußdorf am Inn (officially: Nußdorf a. Inn) is a municipality in the district of Rosenheim in the state of Bavaria in Germany. Nußdorf consists of 23 boroughs and is a tourist destination in the Inn Valley between the Heuberg Wendelstein mountains on the Tyrol border with Austria. Nußdorf town center has Baroque churches and traditional farm houses.

== History ==
Nußdorf is first recorded in 788 AD in a source referring to the "ecclesia Nuzdorf" (Latin for 'Nuzdorf church') and its associated estate.

On 15 May 1097 a document records that Emperor Henry IV made a stopover in Nußdorf on his way from Verona to Regensburg. The local noble family of Clammenstein is mentioned in documents from the 12th century onwards as residing at the castles of Klammenstein and Ramsau. The last Clammenstein, Conrad III, bequeathed his fortune to the two churches in Nußdorf in 1402. In 1950, the municipality adopted the family coat of arms.

Because of its location in proximity to the Austrian border and along a highway and riverway, Nußdorf was burned to the ground and plundered during the Landshut War of Succession in 1504, the attack of the Croats in 1743, and the Napoleonic Wars. The 1800 territorial reform forced a merger of Nußdorf and the neighboring municipality of Neubeuern. However, popular opposition led the municipalities to split in 1980. Today, Nußdorf am Inn again is an independent municipality.

== Partnerships ==
Nußdorf has instituted a partnership with the French municipality Camblanes-et-Meynac since 1975, which consists of mutual visits and, since 2003, an annual youth exchange.

== Churches ==
- Saint Vitus parish church
- Visitation of Mary shrine
- Saint Leonard church
- Holy Cross church (at the Tyrol border)

== Entertainment ==
- Nußdorf am Inn Pool
- Nußdorf am Inn Sports Center
- Mountain trekking
- Home of Kranimog
