= Wildbarren =

Mountain in Bavaria, Germany

Coordinates: 47°42′N 12°08′E

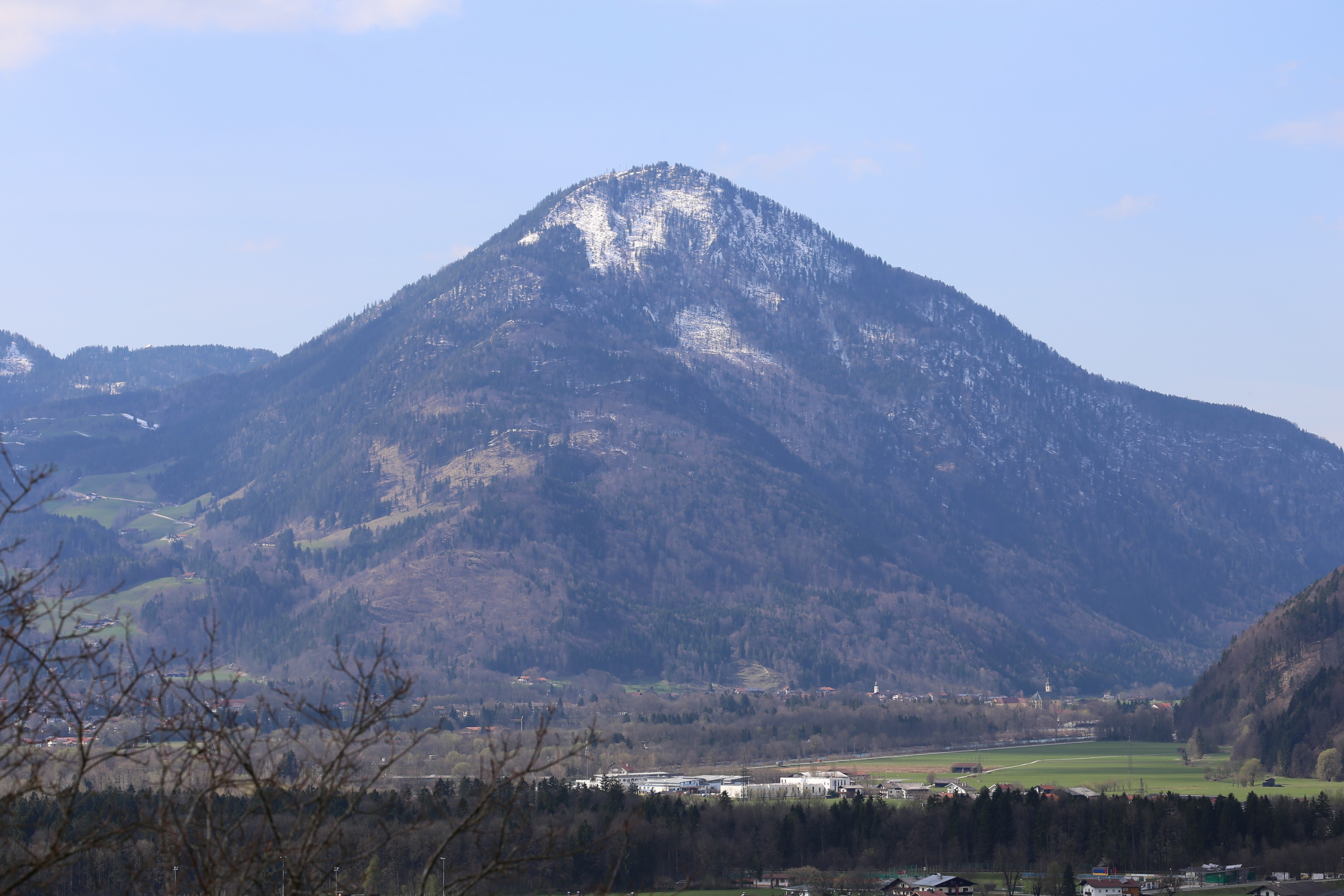
- Wildbarren seen from St. Nikolaus, Ebbs.

Highest point
- Elevation: 1,448 m (4,751 ft)

Geography
- Location: Bavaria, Germany

Wildbarren is a mountain of Bavaria, Germany.
