= Rechelkopf =

Mountain in Bavaria, Germany

Coordinates: 47°43′N 11°38′E

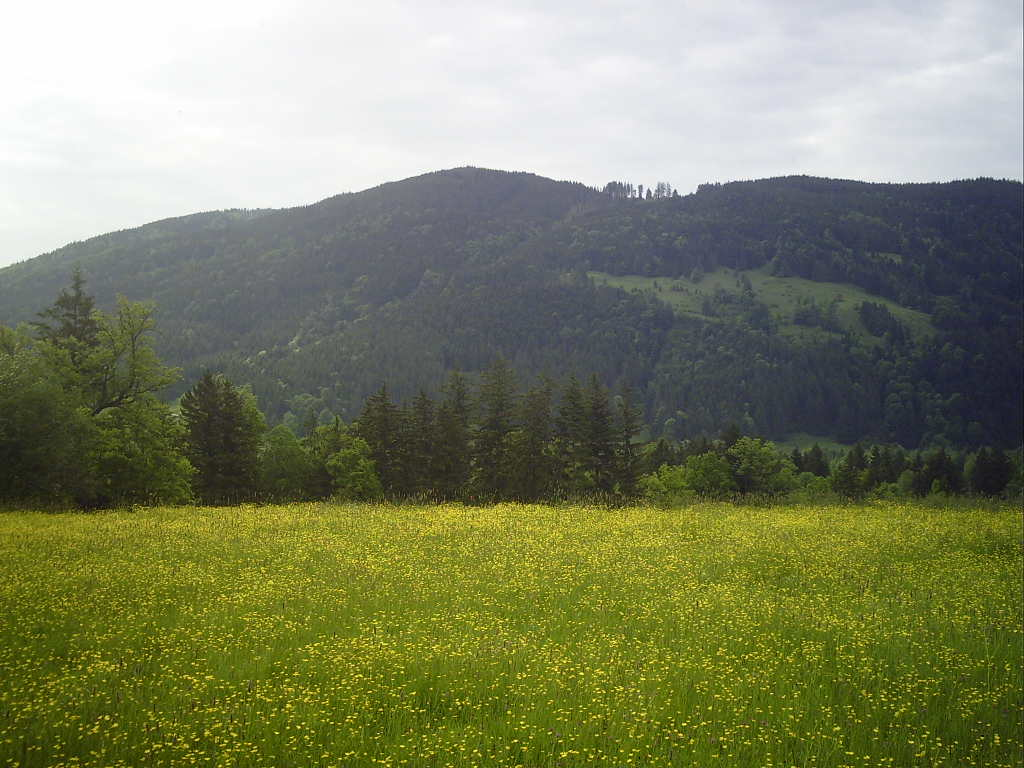
- Rechelkopf.

Highest point
- Elevation: 1,330 m (4,360 ft)

Geography
- Location: Bavaria, Germany

Rechelkopf is a mountain of Bavaria, Germany.
