= Inn Glacier =

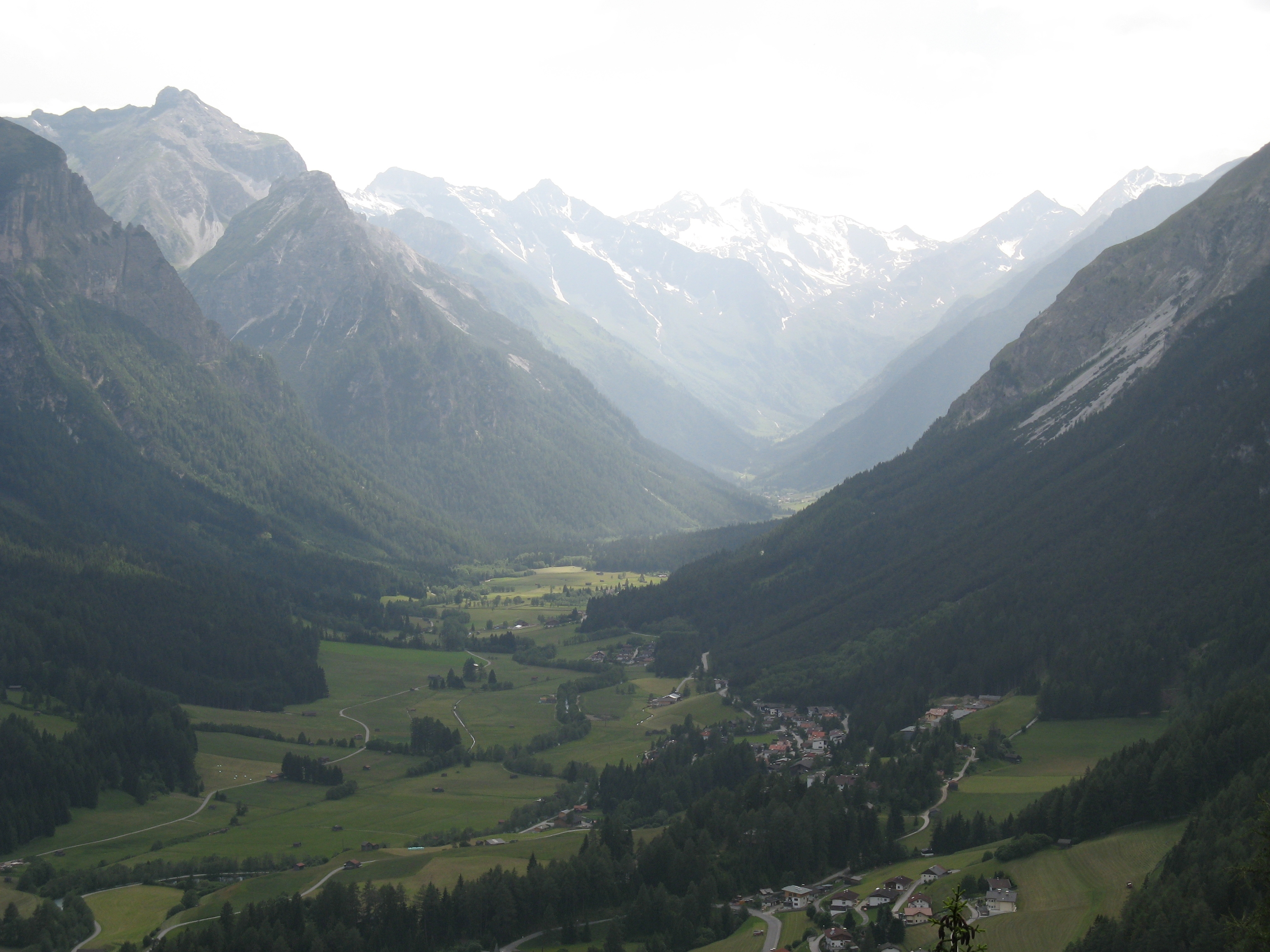
- Present view of the Gschnitz Valley.

- Location within Bavaria Location within Alps Location within Germany
- Interactive map of Inn Glacier
- Location: Bavaria top
- Coordinates: 47°42′37″N 12°09′04″E
- Status: completely melted

The Inn Glacier (German: Inn-Gletscher), also called the Inn Valley Glacier (Inntal-Gletscher). was the ice age glacier of the Alpine river, the Inn. Originating in the Swiss Upper and Lower Engadine (in the present canton of Graubünden), it flowed through the state of Tyrol in Austria (occupying the present day Inn Valley). On German territory it pushed its ice front far into the Bavarian Alpine Foreland. The Inn Glacier attained its greatest thickness and extent during the Riss glaciation (Old moraines). The overwhelming part of the landforms seen today in the valley carved by the Inn Glacier date, however, to the last ice age, the Würm glaciation (Young moraines).

== Literature ==
- Troll, Carl; (1924) Der diluviale Inn-Chiemsee-Gletscher. Das geographische Bild eines typischen Alpenvorlandgletschers.
