= Hahneberg (Neusalza-Spremberg) =

Mountain in Germany

Coordinates: 51°02′52″N 14°31′58″E

Highest point
- Elevation: 410.3 m (1,346 ft)

Geography
- Location: Saxony, Germany

Hahneberg is a mountain of Saxony, southeastern Germany.
