= Wackersberg =

- Municipality
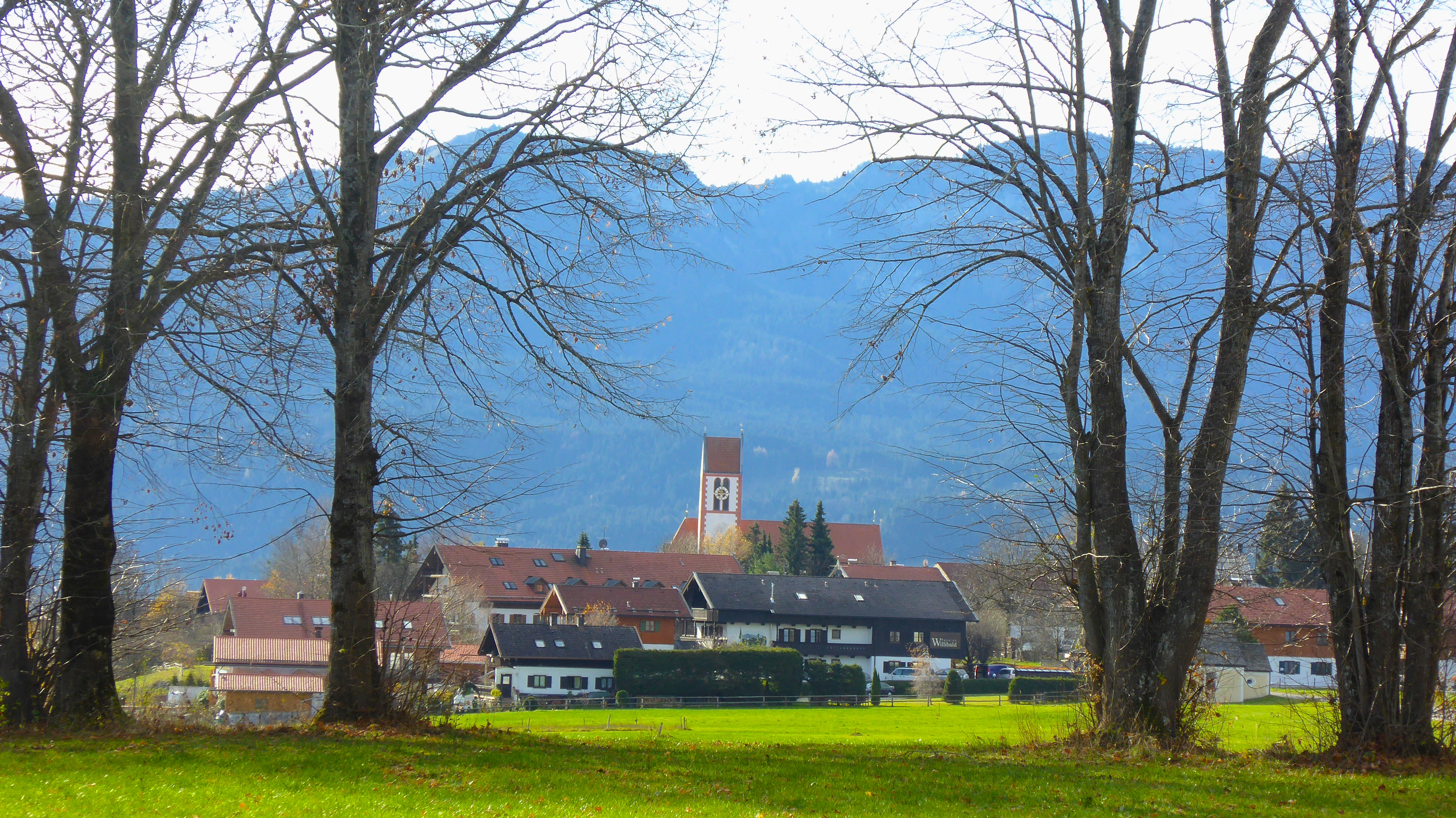
- Wackersberg

- Coat of arms

- Location of Wackersberg within Bad Tölz-Wolfratshausen district
- Interactive map of Wackersberg
- Location within Germany Location within Bavaria
- Coordinates: 47°44′N 11°33′E
- Country: Germany
- State: Bavaria
- Admin. region: Oberbayern
- District: Bad Tölz-Wolfratshausen
- Subdivisions: 4 Ortsteile

Government
  - Mayor (2020–26): Jan Göhzold

Area
  - Total: 64.83 km^{2} (25.03 sq mi)
- Elevation: 735 m (2,411 ft)

Population (2025-12-31)
  - Total: 3,670
  - Density: 56.6/km^{2} (147/sq mi)
- Time zone: UTC+01:00 (CET)
  - Summer (DST): UTC+02:00 (CEST)
- Postal codes: 83646
- Dialling codes: 08041
- Vehicle registration: TÖL
- Website: www.wackersberg.de

Wackersberg is a municipality in the district of Bad Tölz-Wolfratshausen in Bavaria in Germany.
