= Wank (mountain) =

Mountain in Loisach valley, Germany

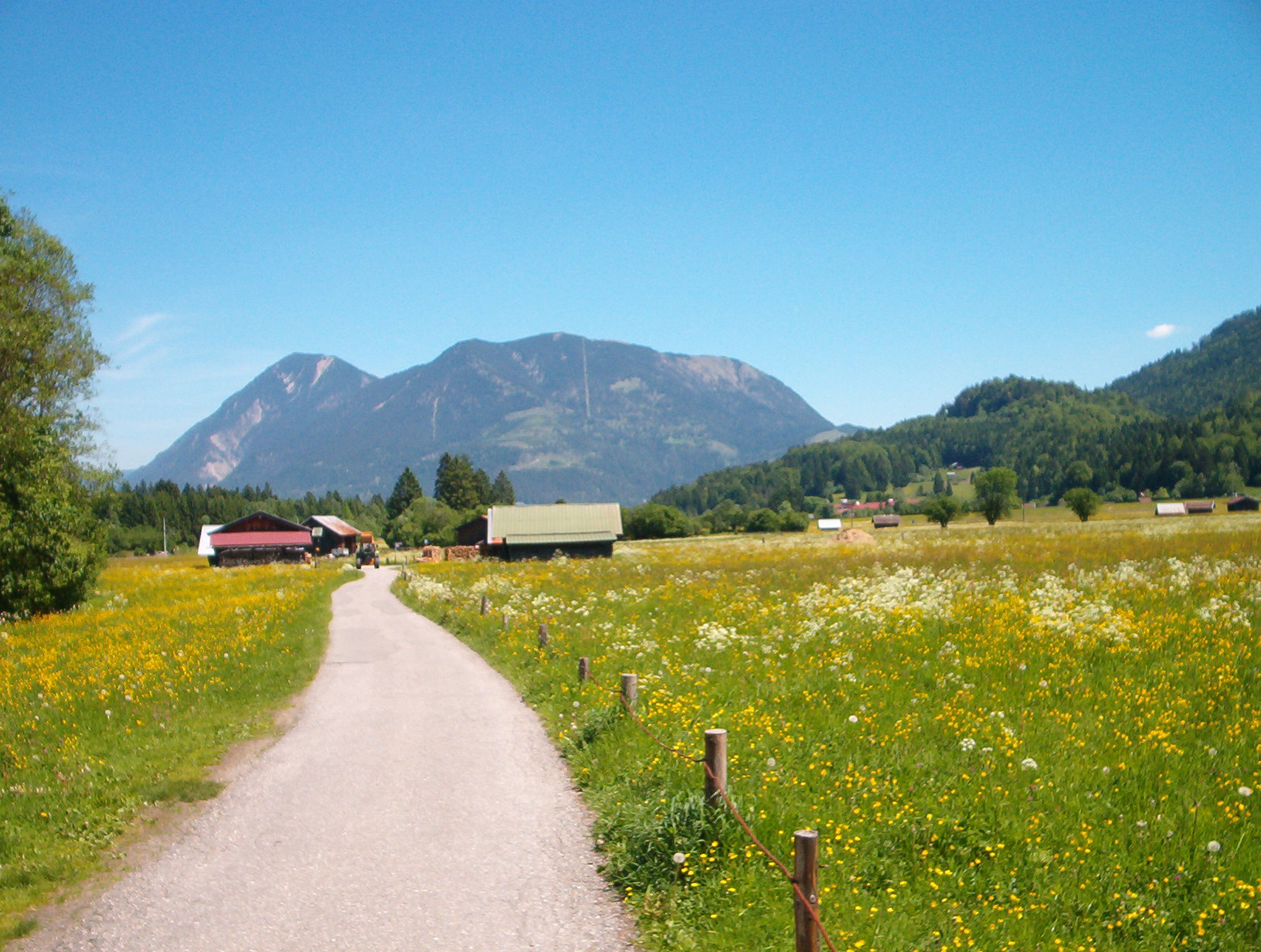

Highest point
- Coordinates: 47°31′N 11°09′E

Geography
- Location within Alps
- Location: Bavaria, Germany
- Parent range: Ester Mountains

The Wank (German pronunciation: [ˈvaŋk]) is a mountain in southern Germany, situated in the Loisach valley close to the Austrian border in the southwestern Ester Mountains range near Garmisch-Partenkirchen. It rises from about 700 metres (2,300 ft) above mean sea level up to 1,780 metres (5,840 ft) at the summit. The mountain is crowned by a grassy summit which has views over Garmisch-Partenkirchen and the surrounding region. The summit can be reached via the eponymous Wankbahn, a cable car system that runs during the summer months, or by a network of footpaths that criss-cross the area. A mountain hut on the summit, the Wank-Haus, provides food and accommodation, and a nearby scientific observatory plays a role in monitoring atmospheric and climatic conditions. The Wank is a destination for hikers, day-trippers from Garmisch-Partenkirchen and paragliders.

== Physical characteristics ==
The mountain's geology, which is dominated by calcareous rocks, is typical of the Bavarian Alps. Its climate is also typical of the region. Precipitation is high, ranging from about 1,300 millimetres (51 in) at valley level to 1,800 millimetres (71 in) at the summit. It peaks in the summer and is lowest in winter. The Wank's mean annual air temperature ranges from 7 °C (45 °F) in the valley to 3 °C (37 °F) at the summit. The prevailing wind comes from a westerly direction but for about 30 to 40 days a year the mountain experiences a warm, dry föhn wind. A local wind system also operates in the area giving a daily uphill/downhill circulation. Inversion layers occur for about 30 days per year, predominantly in the autumn and winter.

The Wank was originally covered by a forest consisting of a mix of spruce, fir and beech trees. A process of man-made deforestation that began in the Roman period, when the trees were cut down and the mountain's slopes were grazed by horses, sheep, goats and cattle, resulted in much of the forest being destroyed by the 15th century. Forestry in the area was taken over by the Bavarian government in 1803 but the former forest cover did not regenerate due in part to the continued use of forest lands as pasture, storms and browsing by game animals. As a result, the current Wank forest is predominantly spruce (about 75%) and pine (15%). Forestry programmes are currently underway to improve the arboreal diversity of the mountain.

== Wankbahn ==
1930s poster advertising the newly opened Wankbahn cable car

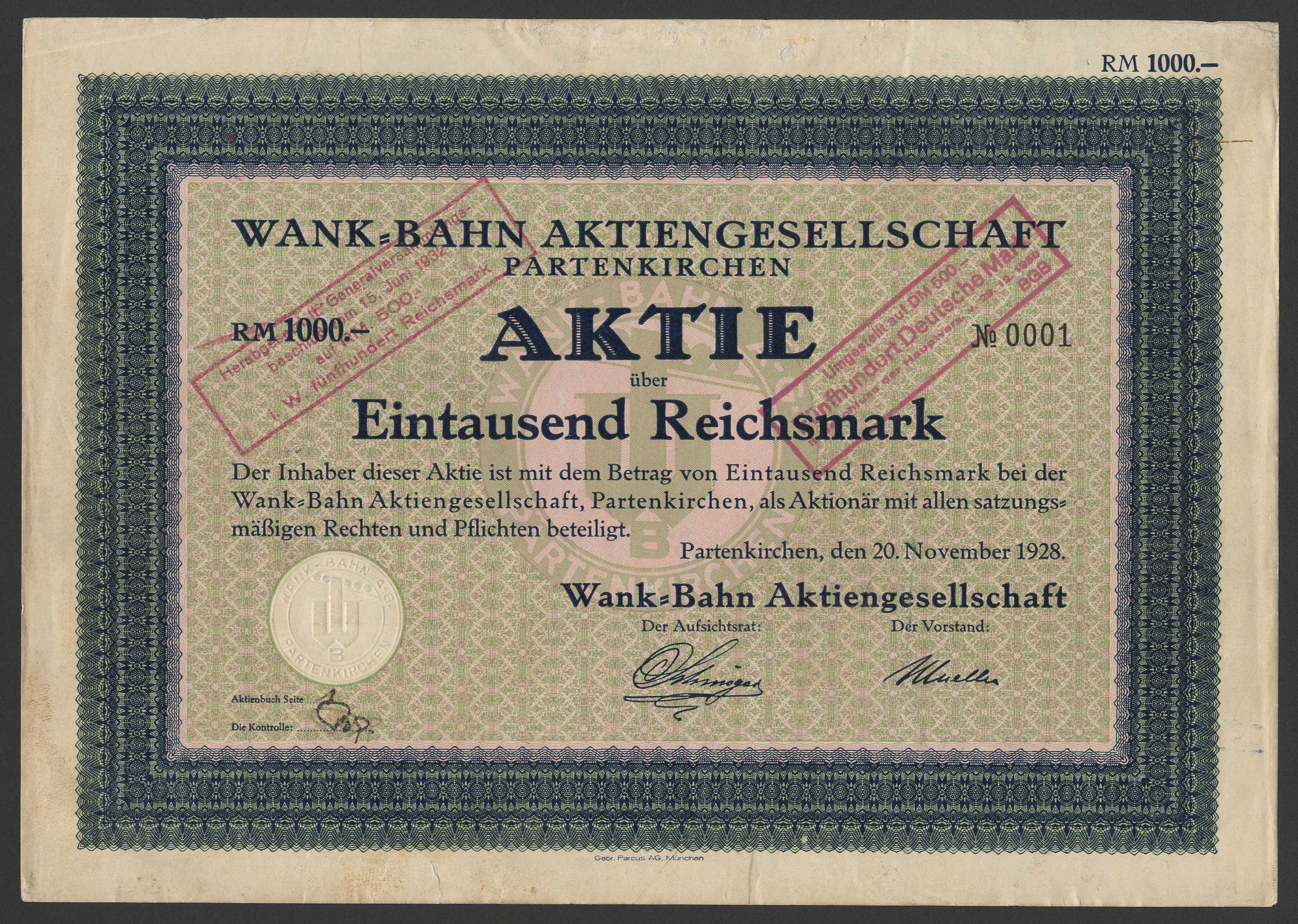
Share of the Wank-Bahn AG, issued 20 November 1928

The Wank is linked to Garmisch-Partenkirchen by a cable car system called the Wankbahn, which usually operates between May and September during daylight hours. Construction began in 1928 under the auspices of the Wank-Bahn AG and the cable car entered service in 1929. It is 3 kilometres (1.9 mi) long and rises from 740 to 1,750 metres (2,430 to 5,740 ft) above sea level. The system has been upgraded several times since its opening. In 1960 its passenger capacity was increased from 125 to 210 persons per hour. A new Wankbahn was built in 1982, opening on 18 December, which increased the system's capacity to 1,000 persons per hour. Two 300 kW DC motors were installed to drive the cable.

The current Wankbahn is built in two sections, measuring 1,670 and 1,330 metres (5,480 and 4,360 ft) long respectively, with a maximum height of 45 metres (148 ft) above the ground. The Wankbahn's 135 cabins each have a capacity of four people. They take approximately 18 minutes at a speed of 4 metres per second (9 mph) to reach the summit station. A "Wankpass" permits year-round access to the cable car.

== Summit ==
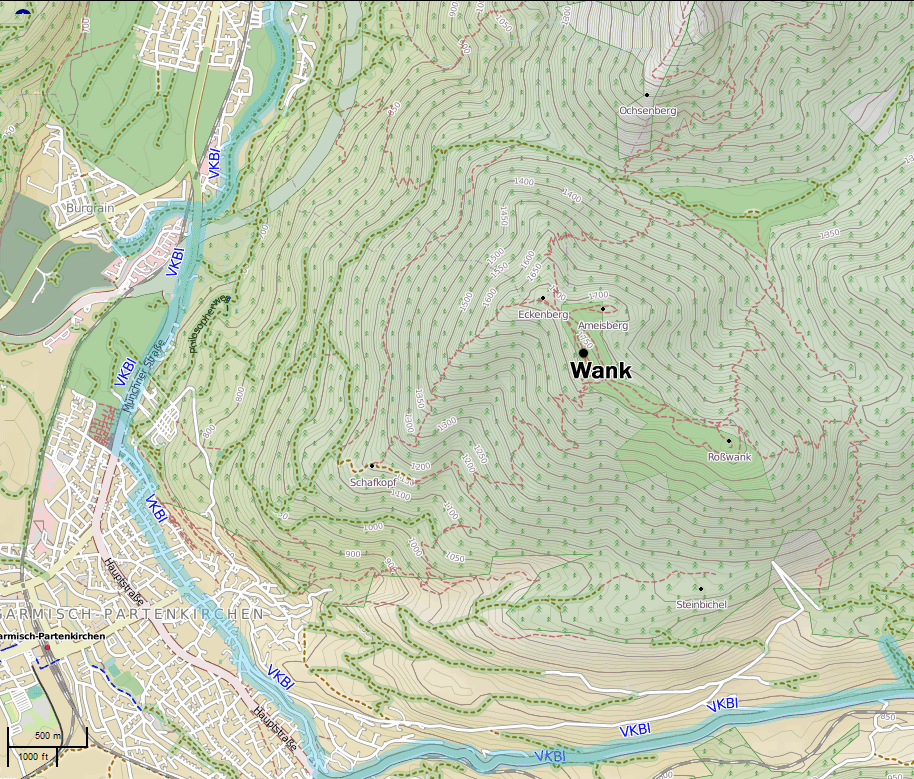
Map of the Wank and part of Garmisch-Partenkirchen

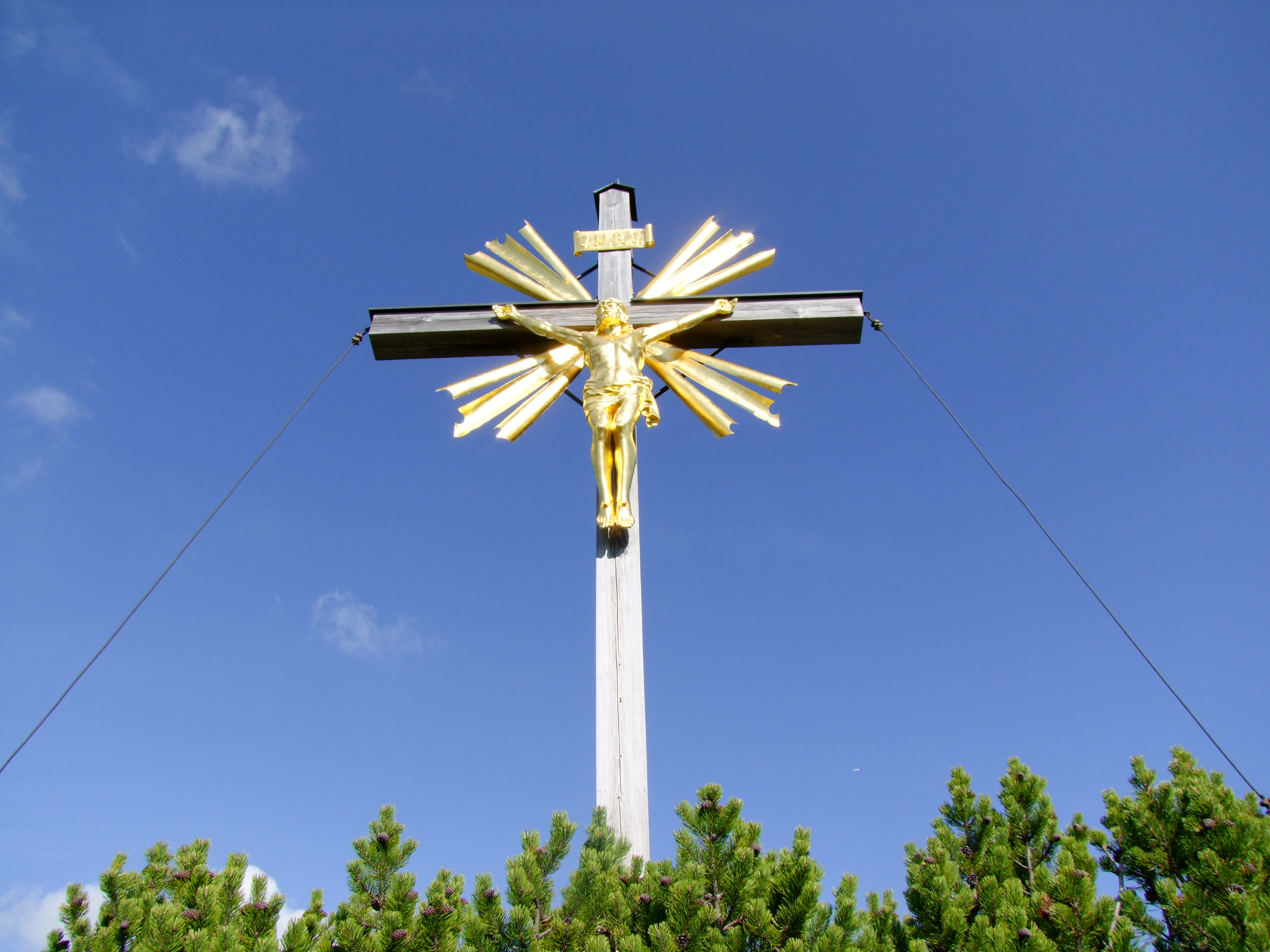
Summit cross on the Wank

The grassy summit of the Wank is topped by a cross, set up in July 1904 by the Werdenfelser Heimat Partenkirchen society. Nearby is an observatory and the Wank-Haus, also known as the Alois Huber Haus, a mountain hut that provides food and accommodation to visitors. The Wank-Haus was built by the local branch of the German Alpine Association (DAV) in 1911. Its construction was originally proposed in 1894 and was approved by the Bavarian Forest Service in 1903. It was designed by the Partenkirchen DAV's Treasurer, Alois Huber, and work began in July 1910. It was opened on 28 May 1911 and was renamed after Huber following his death in 1922. It has since been renovated and upgraded on several occasions, most recently in 2006.

The summit is known for its views across the region, which provide views of Garmisch-Partenkirchen and a panorama of the Zugspitze and the Wetterstein mountain range. Patrons of Garmisch's spas sometimes take-in the sunshine at the summit as part of their Liegekur ("deckchair cure").

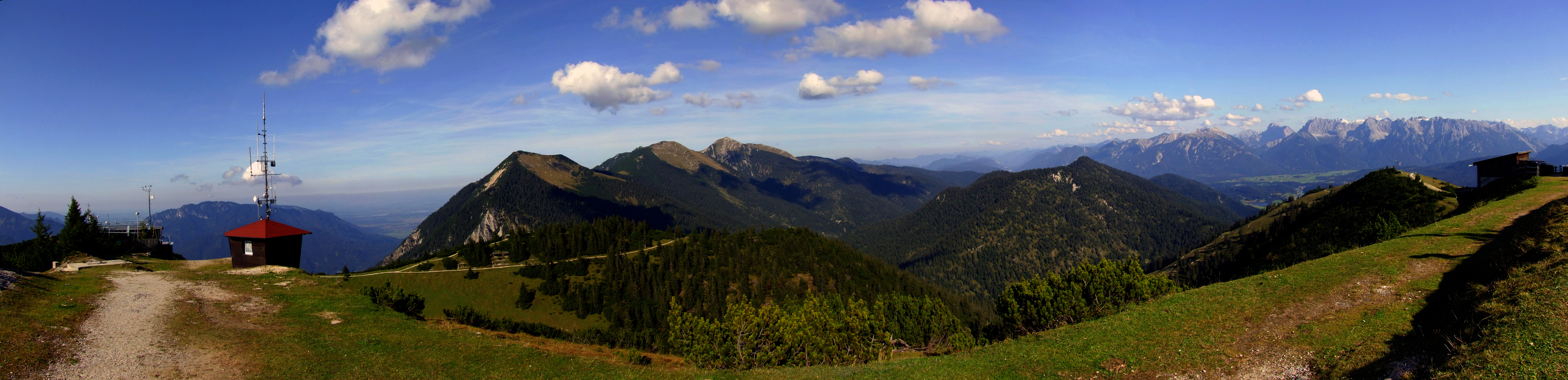
Panorama taken from the summit of the Wank

=== Summit observatory ===
The summit observatory, which is located at an altitude of 1,782 metres (5,846 ft), is an important scientific measuring station operated by the Institute for Meteorology and Climate Research of Karlsruhe Institute of Technology. Since 1972 it has measured a variety of atmospheric and climatic phenomena, including the levels of ozone, nitric oxide, sulphur dioxide and various hydrocarbons in the atmosphere as well as meteorological data such as the levels of temperature, dew point, relative humidity, pressure, wind, global and direct irradiance. It became part of the World Meteorological Organization's Background Air Pollution Monitoring Network in 1982. Supplementary meteorological stations have also been established at middle elevation (1,175 metres (3,855 ft) above sea level) and in the valley at 735 metres (2,411 ft). This has enabled scientists to measure a range of natural phenomena including the transport of air pollutants in the region and a marked decline since 1990 in the amount of atmospheric mercury pollution, an effect which has been attributed to the post-1989 closure of polluting factories in the former Eastern Bloc states.

== Paragliding ==
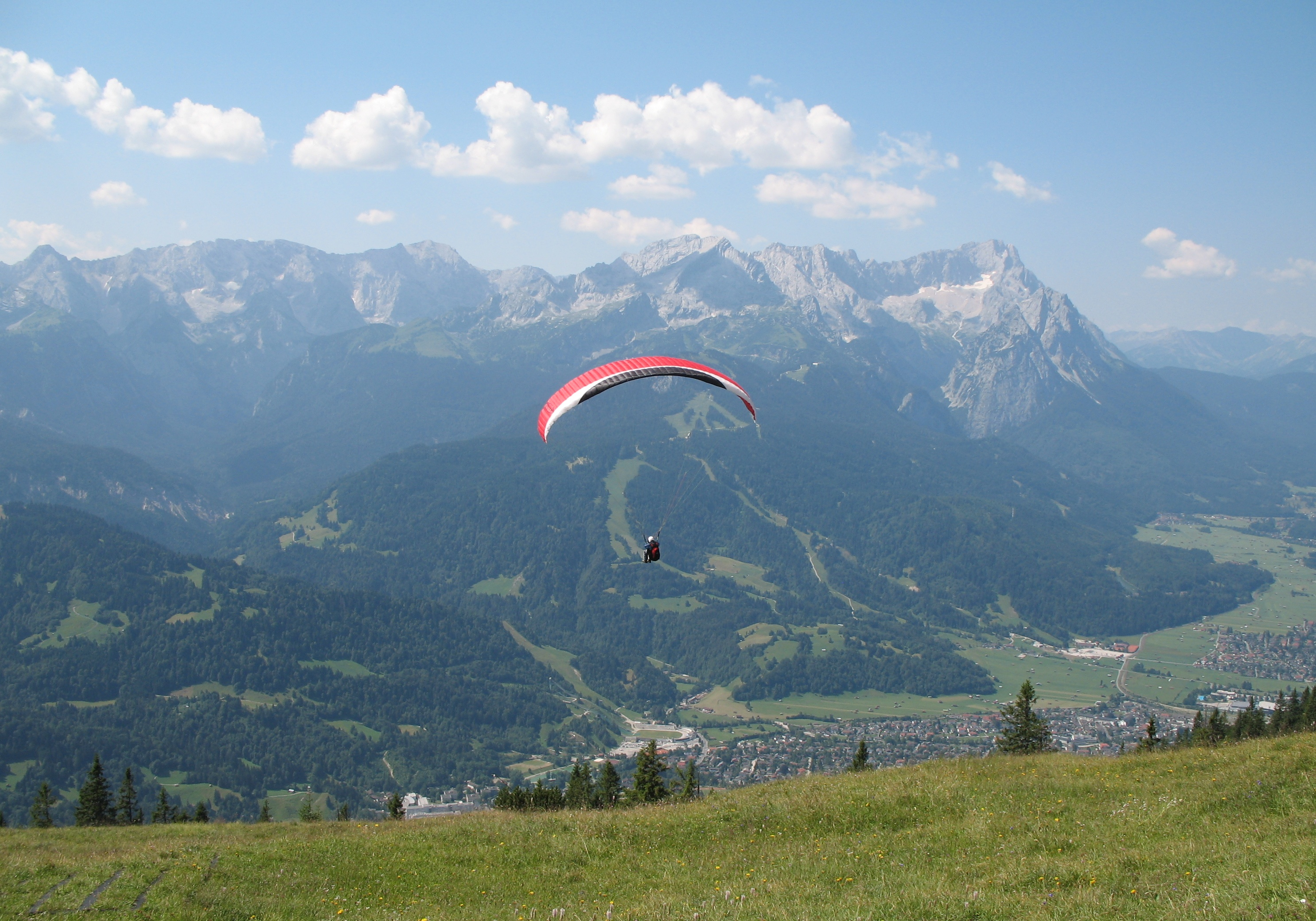
A paraglider taking off from the summit of the Wank, with the Wetterstein mountain range in the background

The mountain is a popular destination for enthusiasts of paragliding who take off from the summit plateau to fly south into the Garmisch-Partenkirchen valley or to peaks in the Wettersteingebirge. The mountain's thermals make it popular, as they enable paragliders to make long flights when the weather conditions are right.

== Humour ==
The term wank is British slang for masturbation; this has made the mountain, and particularly the Wank-Haus restaurant and Wankpass, a frequent target of humour among British people. Signage theft has also been linked to tourists amused by the name.
