= Geißriegel =

Mountain in Germany

- Location within Bavaria

Highest point
- Elevation: 1,043 m (3,422 ft)
- Coordinates: 48°54′15″N 13°00′33″E

Geography
- Location: Grafling, Deggendorf, Bavaria, Germany
- Parent range: Bavarian Forest

Geology
- Rock type: Gneiss

The 1,043-metre-high Geißriegel is a mountain in the Danube Hills, the anterior part of the Bavarian Forest, southwest of the Lower Bavarian county town of Regen and northeast of the county town of Deggendorf. It lies within the municipality of Grafling in the county of Deggendorf.

Together with the Dreitannenriegel (1090.2 m), the Steinberg (999 m), the Hochoberndorfer Berg (806.7 m) and the Ulrichsberg (636 m), it forms a group of mountains to the east of the valley of Graflinger Tal that separate the villages of Grafling and Bischofsmais.

Other nearby peaks are the Breitenauriegel and the Geißkopf.
