= Anterior Bavarian Forest =

Part of Bavarian Forest

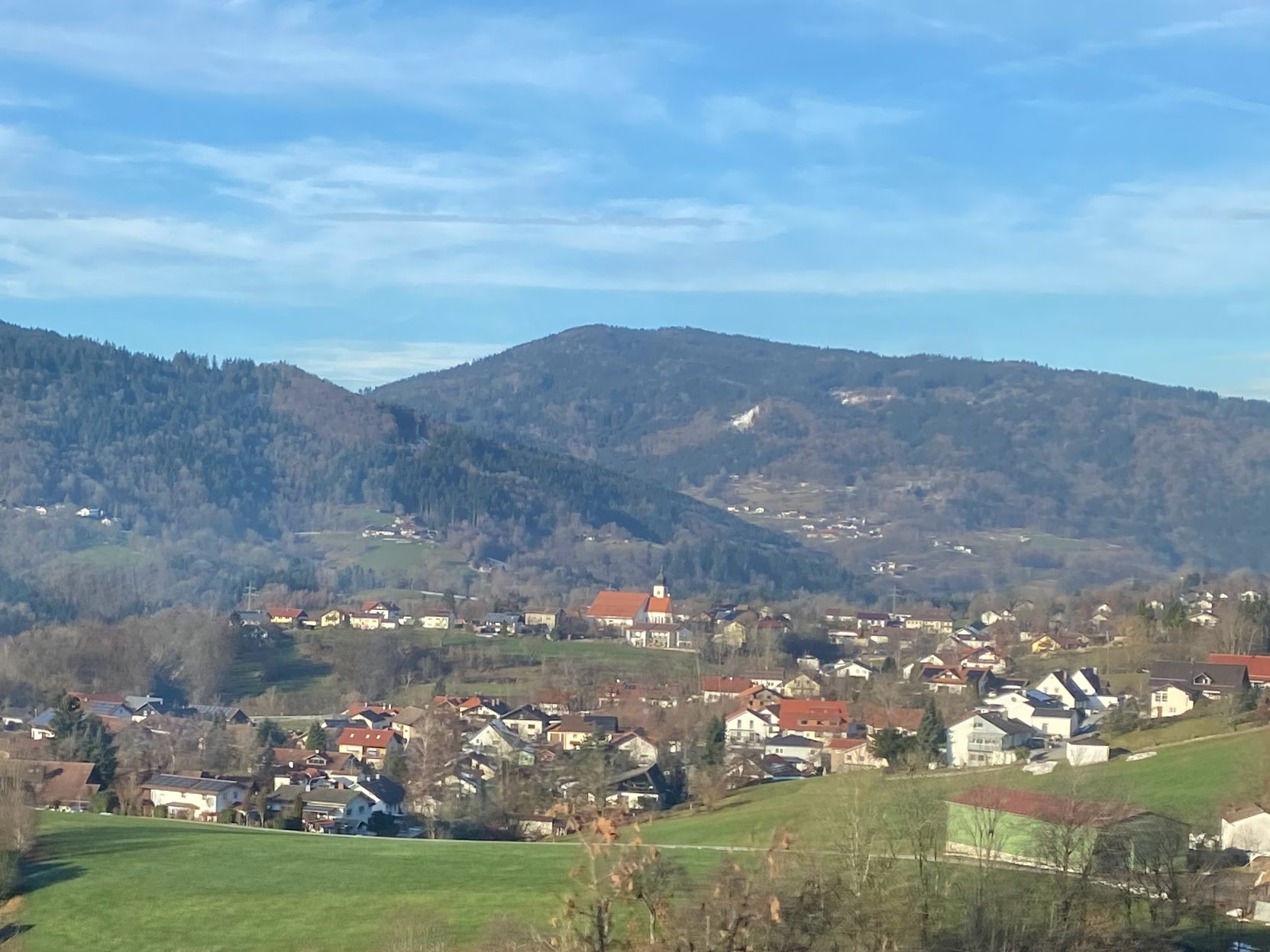
View of the Vogelsang

The Anterior Bavarian Forest (German: Vorderer Bayerischer Wald), also variously called the Vorderer Forest, Vorderer Wald or Danube Hills, is part of the Bavarian Forest, a low mountain range in Germany.

== Name ==
In older geographical-regional literature the German name Vordere Bayerische Wald was applied to the whole southern chain of the Bavarian/Bohemian mountains between the Danube and the Regen, from the Keilberg Depression near Regensburg to the Austro-German border near Passau. Bernhard Grueber and Adalbert Müller described it in 1846 as the äußern Wald ('outer forest') "named the Regen Mountains by the geographers". Others chose the name Danube Hills (Donaugebirge) instead.

Frequently this region was even equated with the Bavarian Forest and contrasted with the Bohemian Forest. Beer, in his work Der Böhmerwald und Bayerische Wald in 1925, talked of a "major prelude to the Bohemian Forest“. Even today, many maps only label the lower forest as the Bavarian Forest.

In 1951, the Bavarian Office of Regional Studies (Amt für Landeskunde) described this region as the Anterior Bavarian Forest (Vorderer Bayerische Wald) and gave its central highlands the name High Bavarian Forest (Hoher Bayerischer Vorwald). As part of the regional division of Germany the term Anterior Bavarian Forest was even exclusively restricted to this area which covered 376 km², which only covered the higher parts of the Vorderer Forest. It became major unit 405 in the natural region major unit group, the Upper Palatine-Bavarian Forest (40).

English sources variously use the names Vorderer Forest, Danube Hills, Vorderer Wald, or Anterior Bavarian Forest.

Regardless of this, the part designated as the Falkensteiner Vorwald in regional studies is also called the Vorderer Bayerischer Wald in German sources used for tourism purposes. However, the following description is based on the regional structure.

== Description ==
The natural region of the Danube Hills is only 8 kilometres wide on average. It runs in the typical Hercynian direction from southeast to northwest between the Danube water gap (Donaurandbruch) in the south and the Pfahl in the north.

The low mountain range consists mainly of granitised gneisses and reaches heights of over one thousand metres. Its highest point is the Einödriegel at 1,121 metres. Other important mountains are the Pröller, Hirschenstein, Vogelsang, Dreitannenriegel, Breitenauriegel, Geißkopf and Brotjacklriegel.

The mountainous region is dominated by woods as well as agriculture and forestry. At the foot of the Pröller lies the winter sports resort of Sankt Englmar. Kalteck, near Langfurth and the Geißkopf and Einödriegel are also important for winter sports. The region is administered by the municipalities of Gotteszell, Grafling, Schöfweg and Zenting. On the Rusel the state road S 2135 crosses the range, whilst the B 11, which originally ran over the Rusel, now bypasses this pass and follows the Bavarian Forest Railway along the Bogenbach. The railway line crosses the Danube Hills at Gotteszell, but needs the 569-metre-long Hochbühl Tunnel to do so.

== Literature ==
- Ulrich Pietrusky, Donatus Moosauer: Der Bayerische Wald – im Fluge neu entdeckt, Verlag Morsak, Grafenau, 1985, ISBN 3-87553-228-7.
