= Einödriegel =

Mountain in Germany

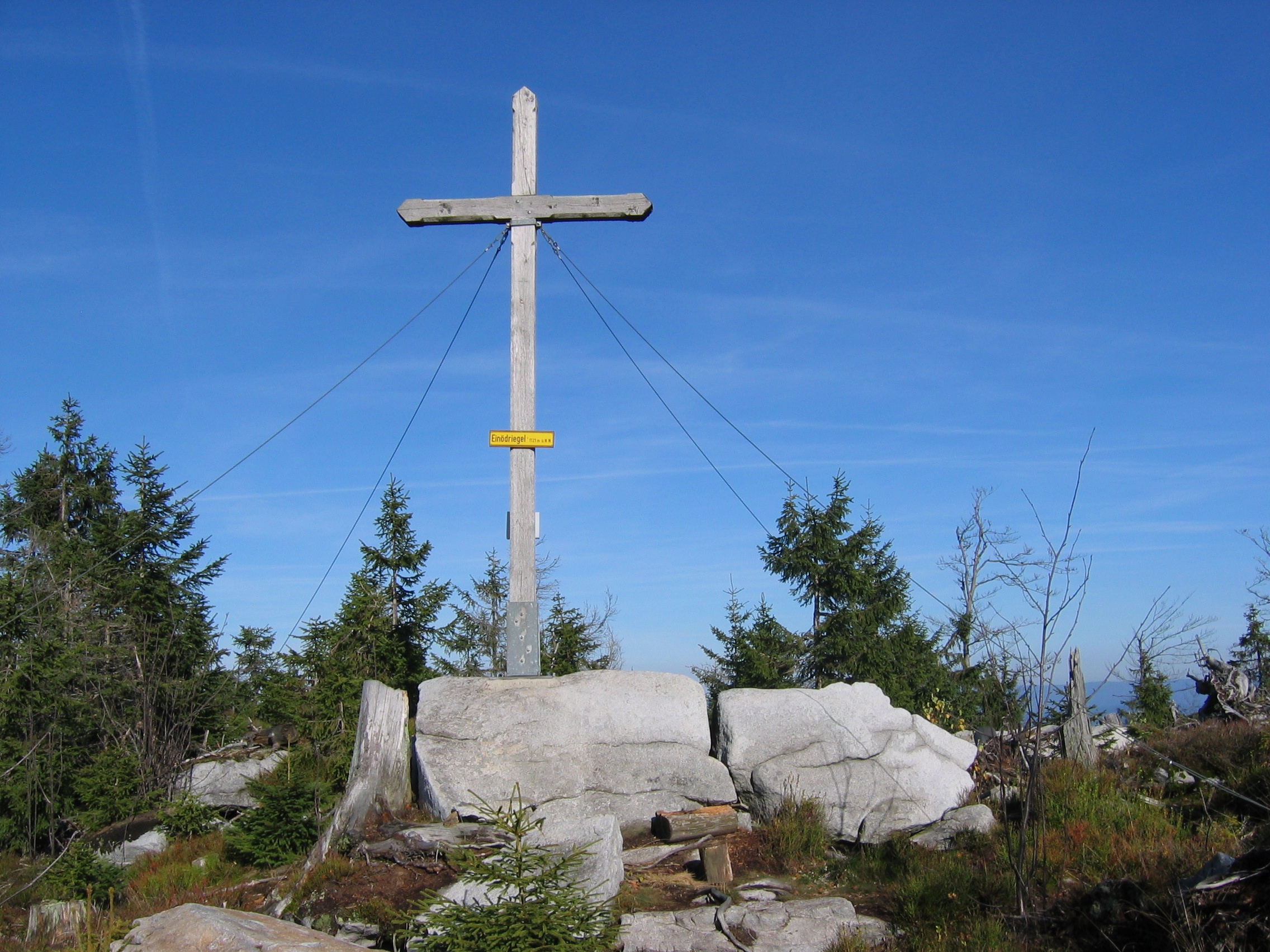
- Summit of the Einödriegel

Highest point
- Elevation: 1,120.6 m above sea level (NHN) (3,677 ft)
- Coordinates: 48°55′39″N 13°01′40″E

Geography
- Location within Bavaria
- Location: Grenze Deggendorf / Regen, Bavaria, Germany
- Parent range: Bavarian Forest

Geology
- Rock type(s): gneiss, granite

The Einödriegel is a mountain, 1,120.6 m above sea level (NHN), in the Bavarian Forest in Germany. It rises southwest of the Lower Bavarian county town of Regen and northeast of the county town of Deggendorf. It is the highest point in the Danube Hills and the county of Deggendorf and lies in the municipality of Grafling.

Neighbouring mountains are the Geißkopf, the Dreitannenriegel and the Breitenauriegel, which all lie along the same ridge near Bischofsmais. The Einödriegel has good views from the top to the west and northeast and an imposing summit cross with rest benches. In the winter a ski lift runs up the mountain from the Unterbreitenau, which is part of the Geißkopf ski area. The top may be reached on foot on a waymarked footpath.

The summit cross does not stand on the highest point of the mountain. The latter is just under 100 metres south of the cross immediately next to the trail on a small rock group which is surrounded by trees and has no views.

According especially to older geographical and lexical works, the mountains of the Hinterer Forest ( the Arber, Rachel, Lusen and others) are already counted as part of the Bohemian Forest, so based on that definition the Einödriegel would be the highest peak in the Bavarian Forest. Even in 1982 the Brockhaus wrote in an article entitled Bayerischer Wald that: "in a geographical sense the Bavarian Forest is that part of the Bohemian Forest that rises as the Vorderer Wald (Danube Hills) between the rivers Danube and Regen (at the Einödriegel to 1,121 m)".
