= Abteiland =

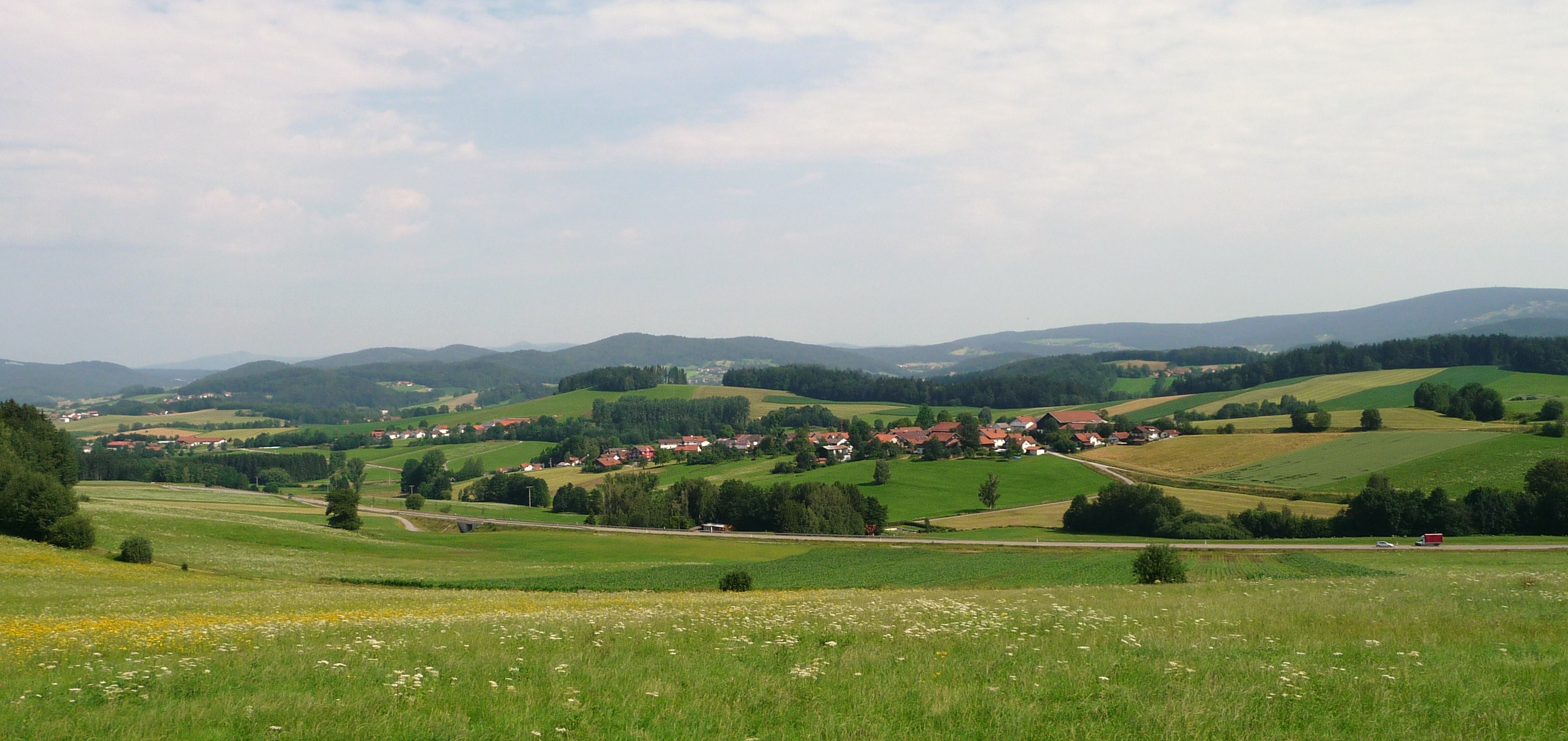
Landscape in the Abteiland near Waldkirchen

The Abteiland ("Abbey Land") is a former estate owned by Niedernburg Abbey above Passau. From the early 13th century until the seizure of church property under Napoleon in 1803, the region belonged to the Hochstift or Prince-Bishopric of Passau with the prince bishop as its secular and spiritual head. The region lies in the Bavarian Forest north of the River Danube and east of the River Ilz. It was crossed by a historical trade route, the Goldener Steig ("Golden Trail"). Its main settlement was Waldkirchen, which was granted wide-ranging rights by the prince bishops of Passau.

The Abteiland has great significance as a cultural landscape rich in species and habitats and is viewed as a refugium for endangered plants and animals. Together with the Neuburg Forest it forms natural region no. 408 - the Passau Abteiland and Neuburg Forest - within the Upper Palatine-Bavarian Forest.

In April 2011, the Abteiland Working Group was formed from the following eleven municipalities:

Municipality	Population 2011	Area (km^{2})	Coordinates
Hauzenberg	12.025	82,82	48°39′N 13°37′E
Thyrnau	4.235	33,68	48°37′N 13°32′E
Obernzell	3.850	18,25	48°33′N 13°38′E
Untergriesbach	3.104	73,60	48°34′N 13°40′E
Sonnen	1.447	16,48	48°41′N 13°43′E
Wegscheid	5.517	80,68	48°36′N 13°47′E
Breitenberg	2.173	29,87	48°42′N 13°48′E
Neureichenau	4.396	46,38	48°45′N 13°45′E
Haidmühle	1.388	21,03	48°50′N 13°47′E
Jandelsbrunn	3.284	42,40	48°44′N 13°42′E
Waldkirchen	10.507	80,06	48°44′N 13°36′E

== History ==
The Bavarian Forest north of Passau was settled in a first wave in the 9th/10th century. According to a (not wholly authenticated) document, in the year 1010 King Henry II (emperor from 1014) gifted large areas north of the Danube to convent of Niedernburg in Passau. The name Abteiland is still used today for the former estate of the monastery between the rivers Danube, Ilz and Rodl and the border ridge. In the early 13th century, the region came to the Bishopric of Passau. In the late Middle Ages, the area of influence of the Passau magnates and prelates extended as far as the present Mühlviertel in Austria. Waldkirchen played a special role in the Abteiland. With the first written confirmation of market rights in 1285, Waldkirchen was also received its own jurisdiction from the prince bishop of Passau, which was the lowest level of legal authority. There used to be a pillory on the market place, Waldkirchner Marktplatz.

The market town judge was appointed by the prince-bishop and had performed functions like that of a mayor. He performed his duties along with six council members. At the annual E'haft (Ehehaft = 'sitting', from the Germanic Ewa or Eha = law) meeting, legal, police and municipal matters were dealt with. All citizens and residents (non-citizens) had to participate.

== Traditions ==
Every year in July in Waldkirchen, the Market Judge Days (Marktrichtertage) are held as a traditional event. They recall the time when the market was still a part of the Prince Bishopric of Passau.
