= Wilhelm Trübner =

German painter

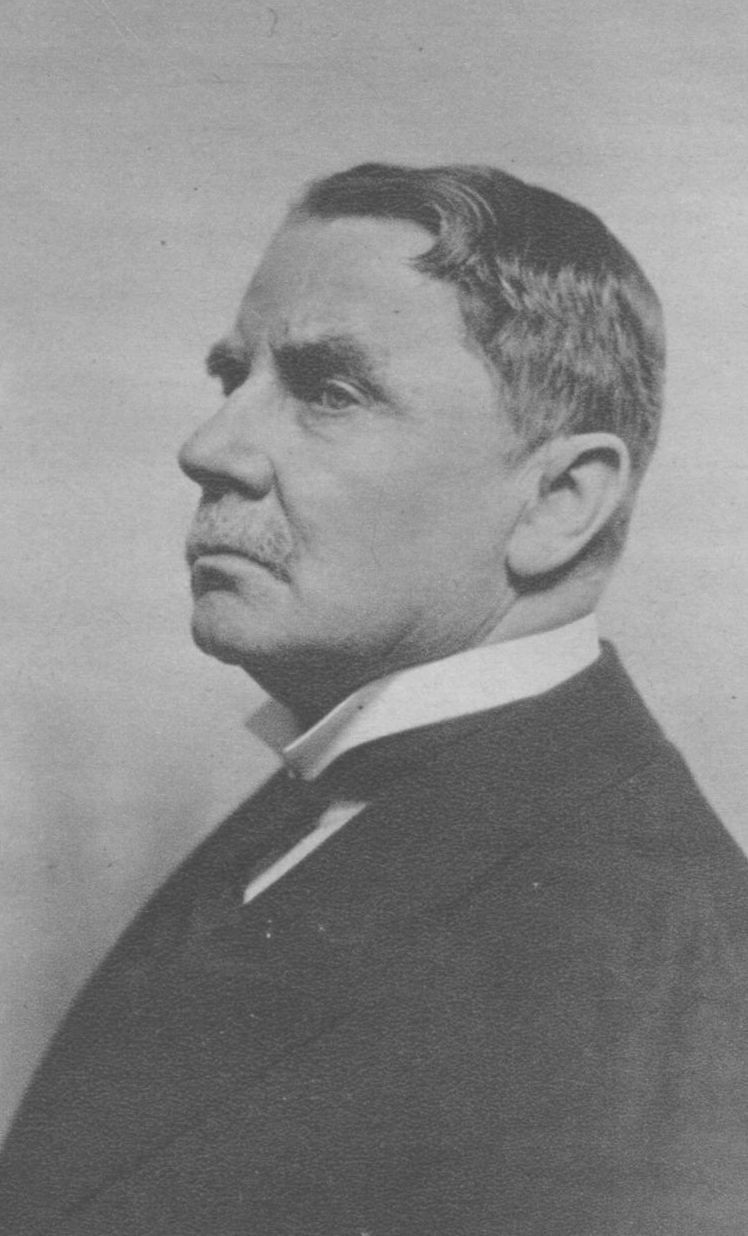
- Born: February 3, 1851; Heidelberg, Grand Duchy of Baden
- Died: December 21, 1917 (aged 66); Karlsruhe, Grand Duchy of Baden, German Empire
- Known for: Painting
- Movement: Realism
- Spouse: Alice Trübner née Auerbach

Wilhelm Trübner (February 3, 1851 – December 21, 1917) was a German realist painter of the circle of Wilhelm Leibl.

== Biography ==
Trübner was born in Heidelberg. He was the third son of a silver- and goldsmith, Johann Georg Trübner, and his wife Anna Maria. In 1867 he began training as a goldsmith in Hanau, and met classicist painter Anselm Feuerbach who encouraged him to study painting. In that year he began studies at the Kunstschule in Karlsruhe under Karl Friedrich Schick. He was influenced by artists he met in Karlsruhe, such as Hans Canon and Feodor Dietz. In 1869 he began studying at the Kunstacademie in Munich, where he was greatly impressed by an international exhibition of paintings by Leibl and Gustave Courbet. Courbet visited Munich in 1869, not only exhibiting his work but demonstrating his alla prima method of working quickly from nature in public performances. This had an immediate impact on many of the city's young artists, who found Courbet's approach an invigorating alternative to the shopworn academic tradition.

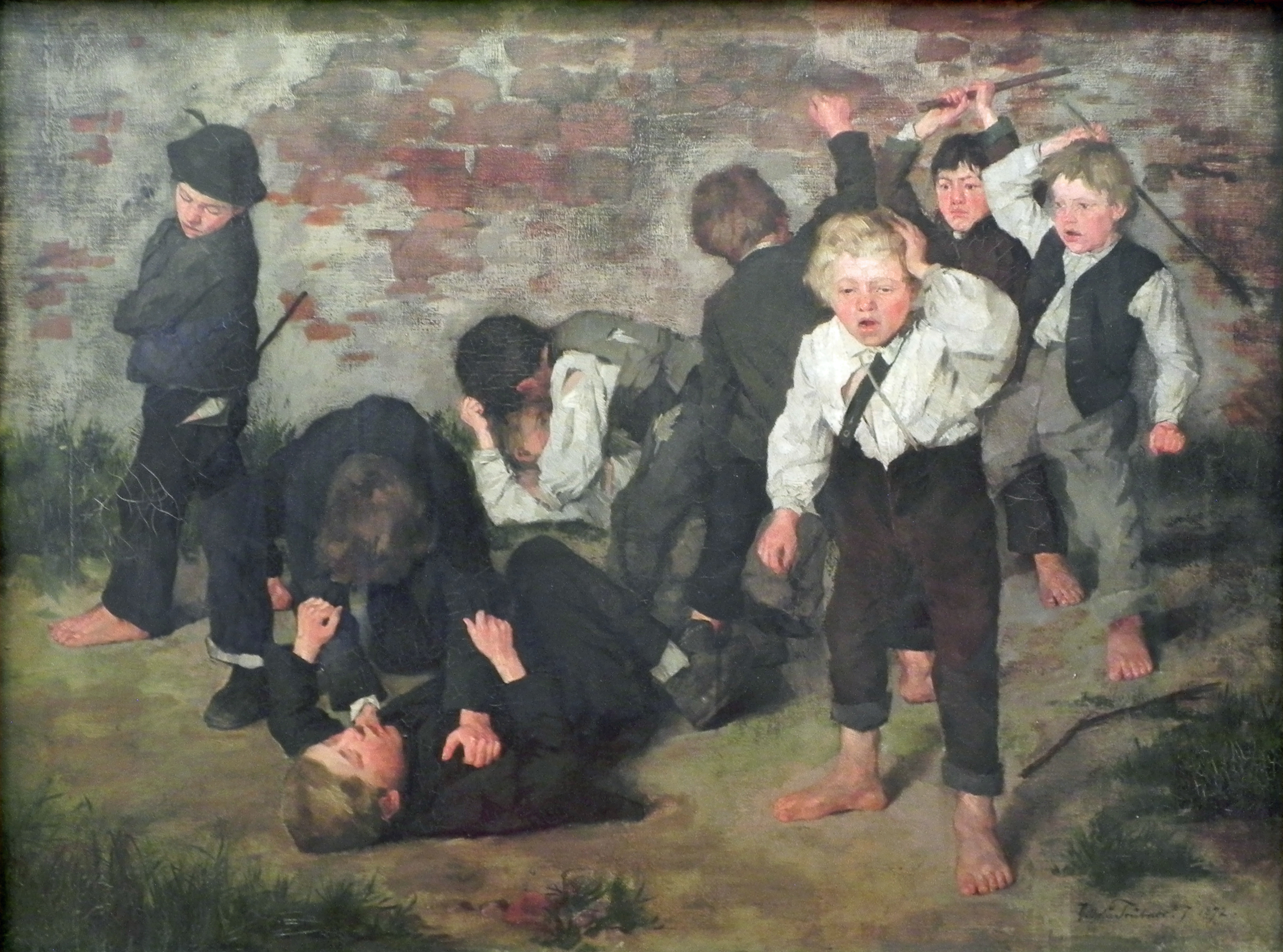
Scuffling Boys (1872)

In 1870 he made the acquaintance of Carl Schuch and Albert Lang. In August 1871, the three artists painted landscapes together during hikes in Hohenschwangau and Bernried, where they met Leibl. In 1872 Trübner met Hans Thoma, another German painter who greatly admired the unsentimental realism of Wilhelm Leibl. Together Trübner, Schuch, Lang, and Thoma formed the core of the group of artists known as the "Leibl circle".

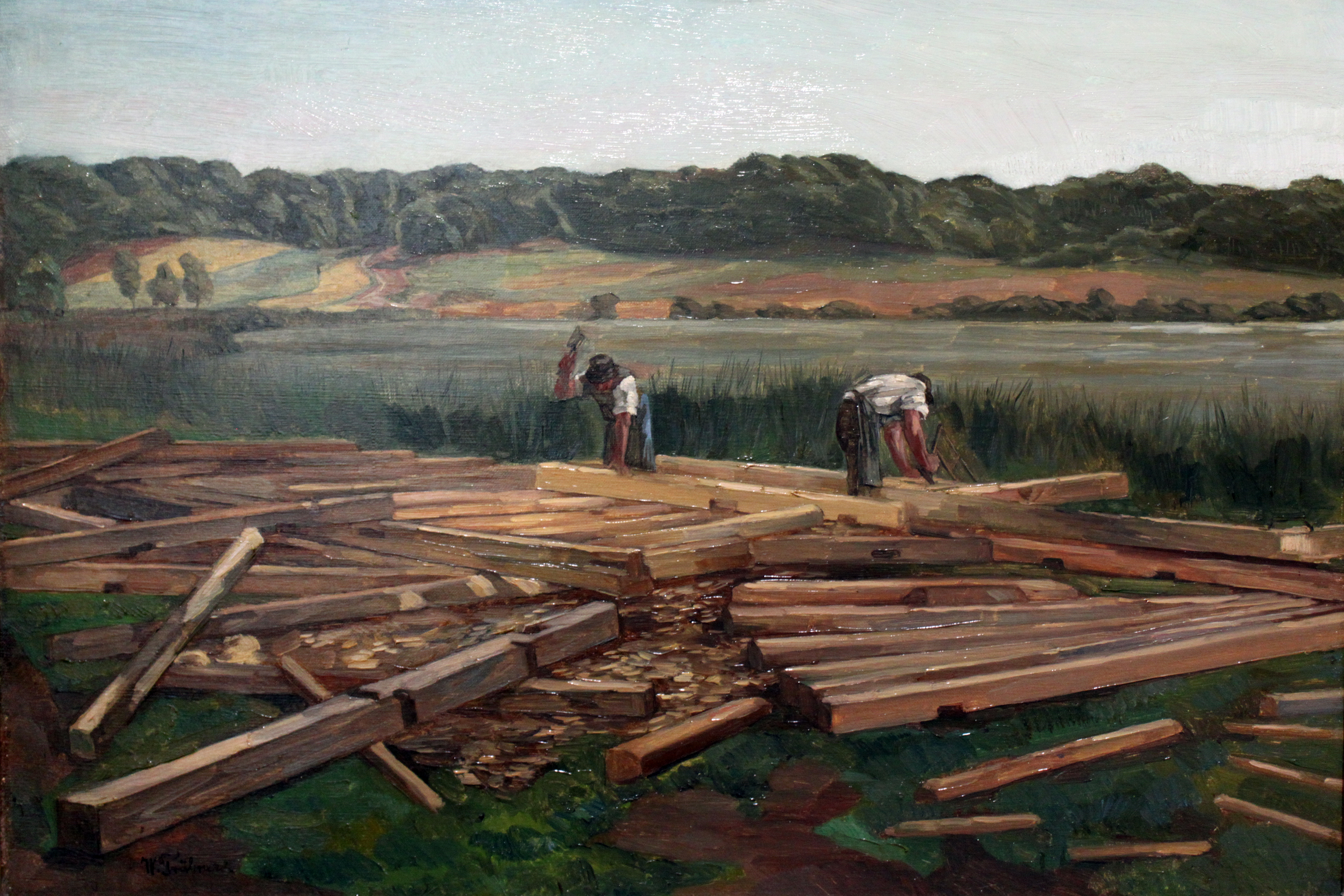
Carpenters on the Banks of Wessling Lake (1876)

The early 1870s were a period of discovery for Trübner. He travelled to Italy, Holland and Belgium, and in Paris encountered the art of Manet, whose influence can be seen in the spontaneous yet restrained style of Trübner's portraits and landscapes. According to art historian Eberhard Ruhmer, "Trübner reached his relatively brief artistic peak between 1872 and 1876, during which time he made some of the most important contributions to the Leibl circle's achievement and produced the most effective examples of what he called 'purist painting'" – paintings in which formal concerns take precedence over subject. His works of this period, such as On the Sofa (1872) and Carpenters on the Banks of Wessling Lake (1876), depict prosaic scenes with a somber realism and subdued color. Subsequently, Trübner attempted to achieve greater success by brightening his palette, and he frequently painted historical and literary subjects.

He published writings on art theory in 1892 and 1898, which express above all the idea that "beauty must lie in the painting itself, not in the subject". By urging the viewer to discover beauty in a painting's formal values, its colors, proportions, and surface, Trübner advanced a philosophy of "art for art's sake". In 1901 he joined the recently formed Berlin Secession, at the time Germany's most important forum for the exhibition of avant-garde art. From 1903 until his death in 1917 he was a professor at the Academy of Arts in Karlsruhe, also serving as director from 1904 to 1910.

Trübner's paintings are in many public collections, especially in Germany, including the Alte Nationalgalerie, Berlin, the Österreichische Galerie Belvedere, Vienna, and the Neue Pinakothek in Munich.

== Gallery ==
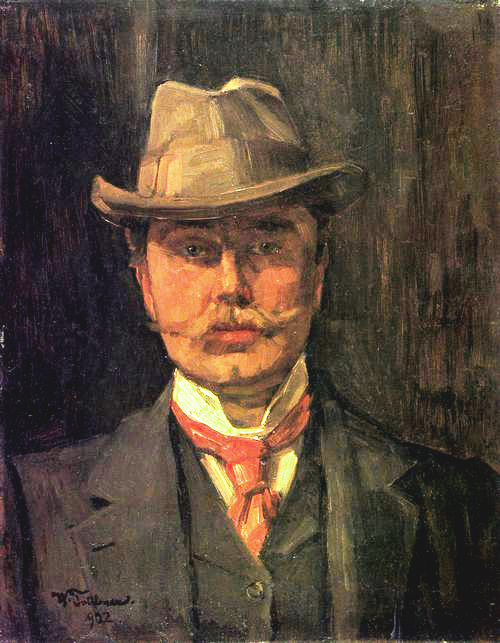
Self portrait (1902)

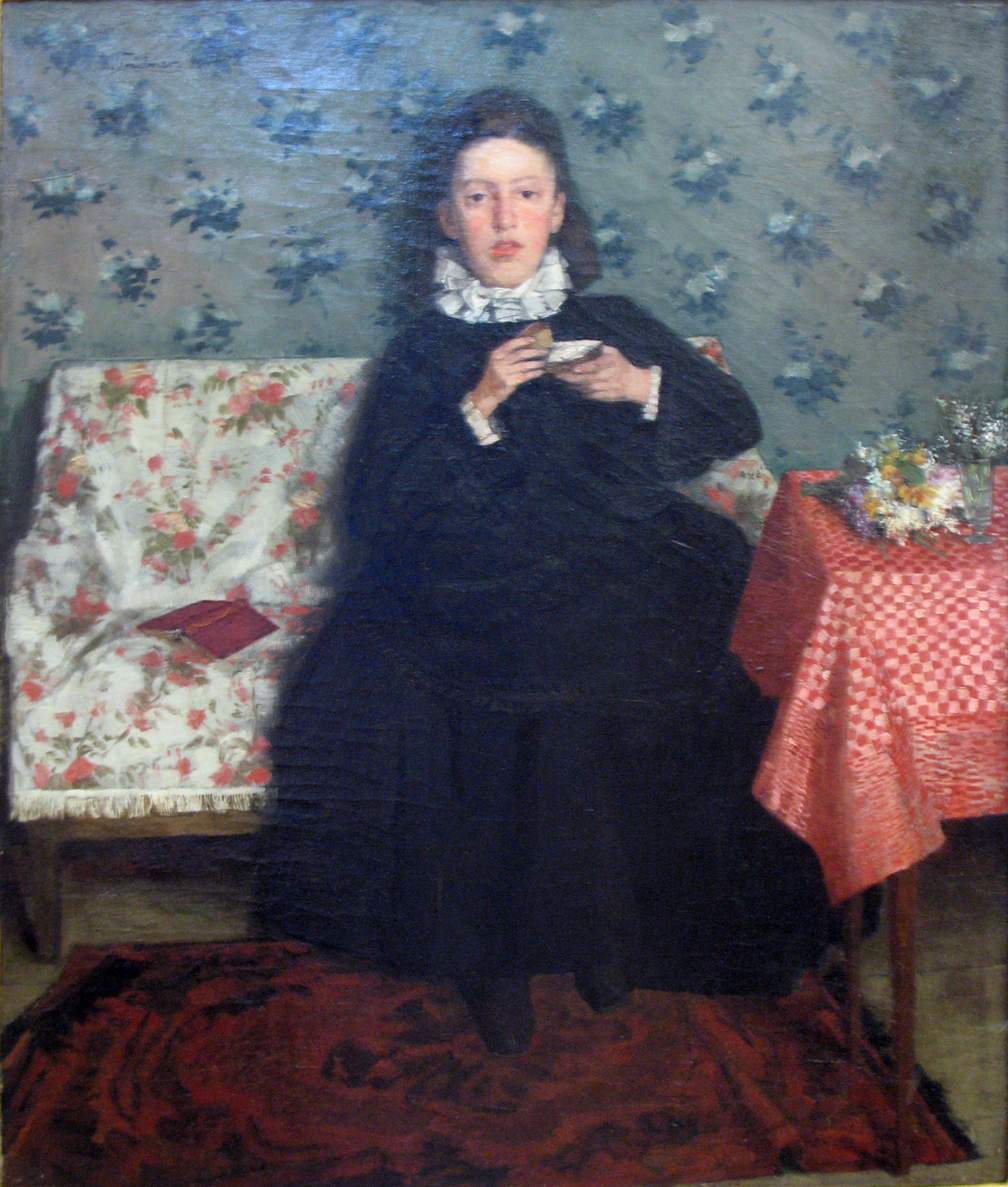
On the Sofa (1872)

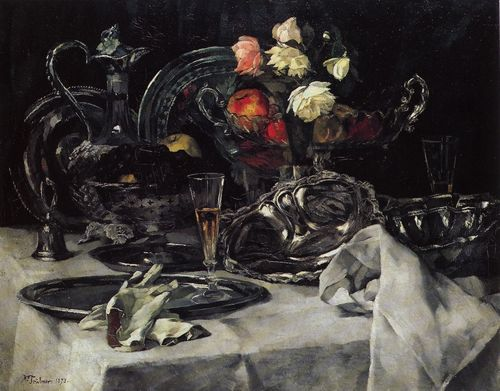
Silver and Roses (1873)

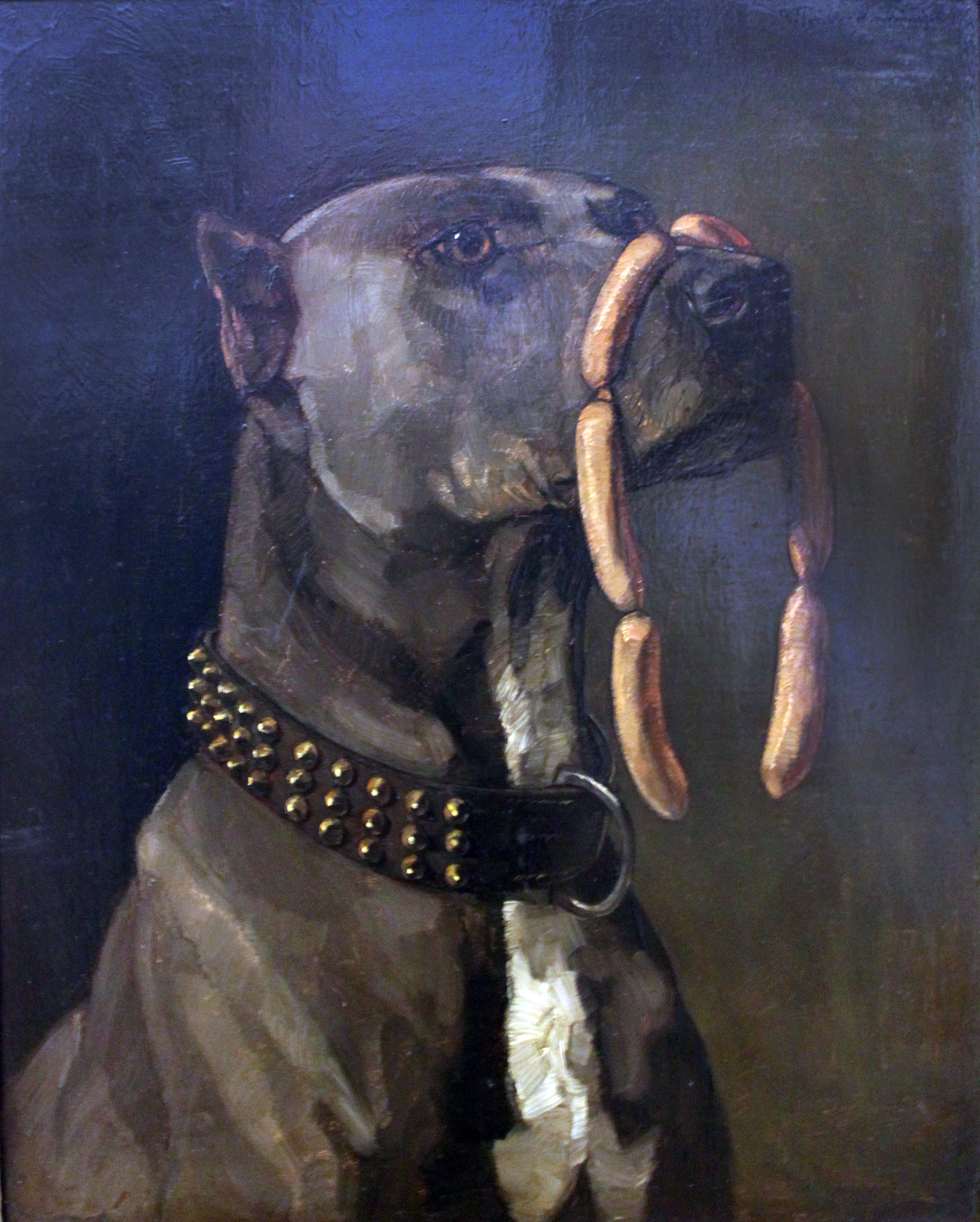
Great Dane with Sausages: "Ave, Caesar, morituri te salutant" (1877)

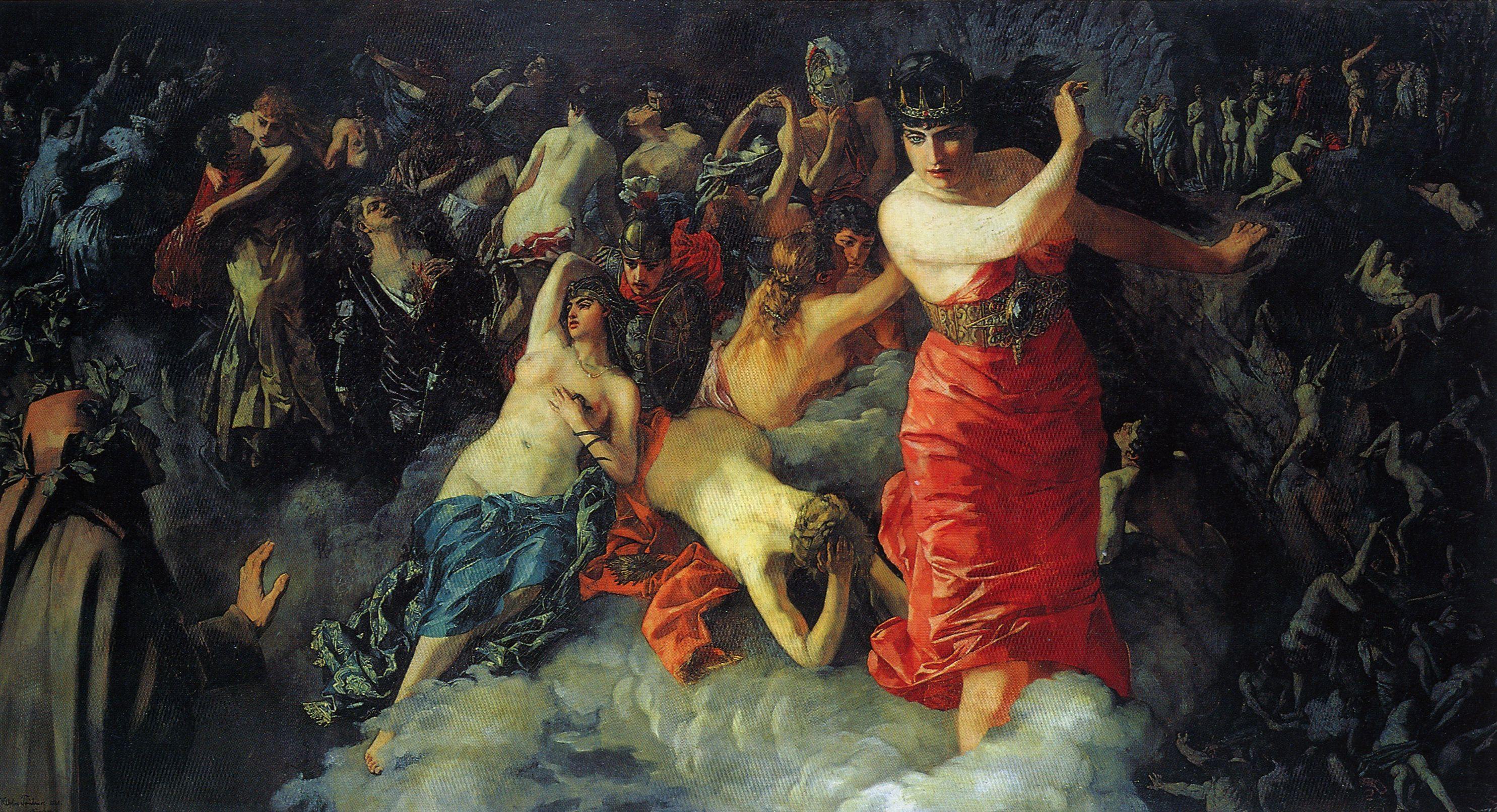
Dante's Inferno (1880)

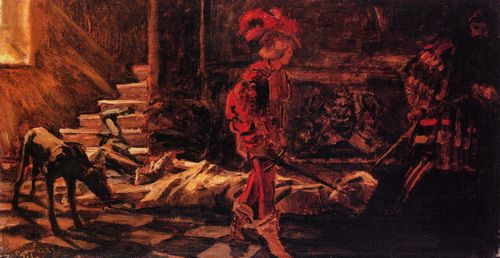
The Death of Pope Alexander VI (1883)

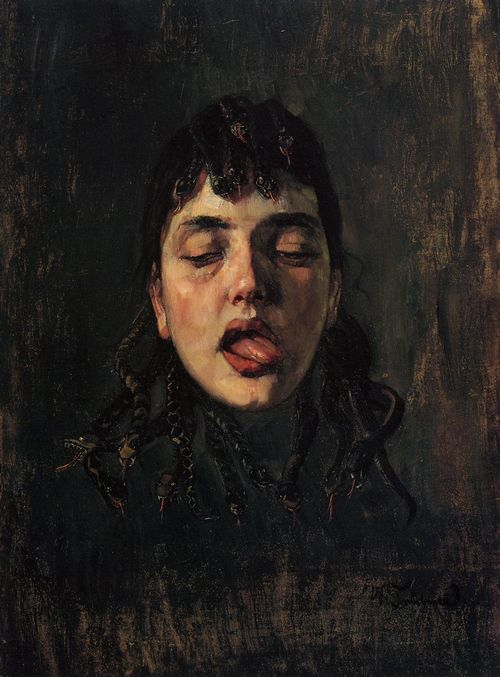
Gorgon (1891)

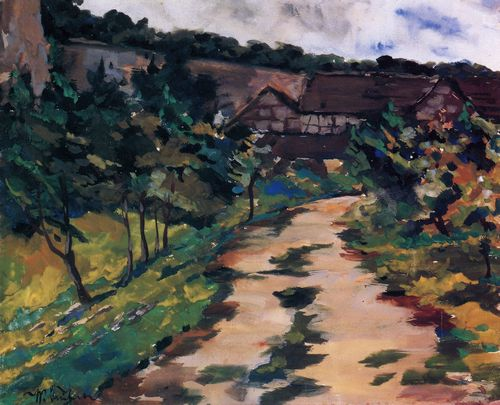
Ermatingen am Bodensee (1894), gouache on paper

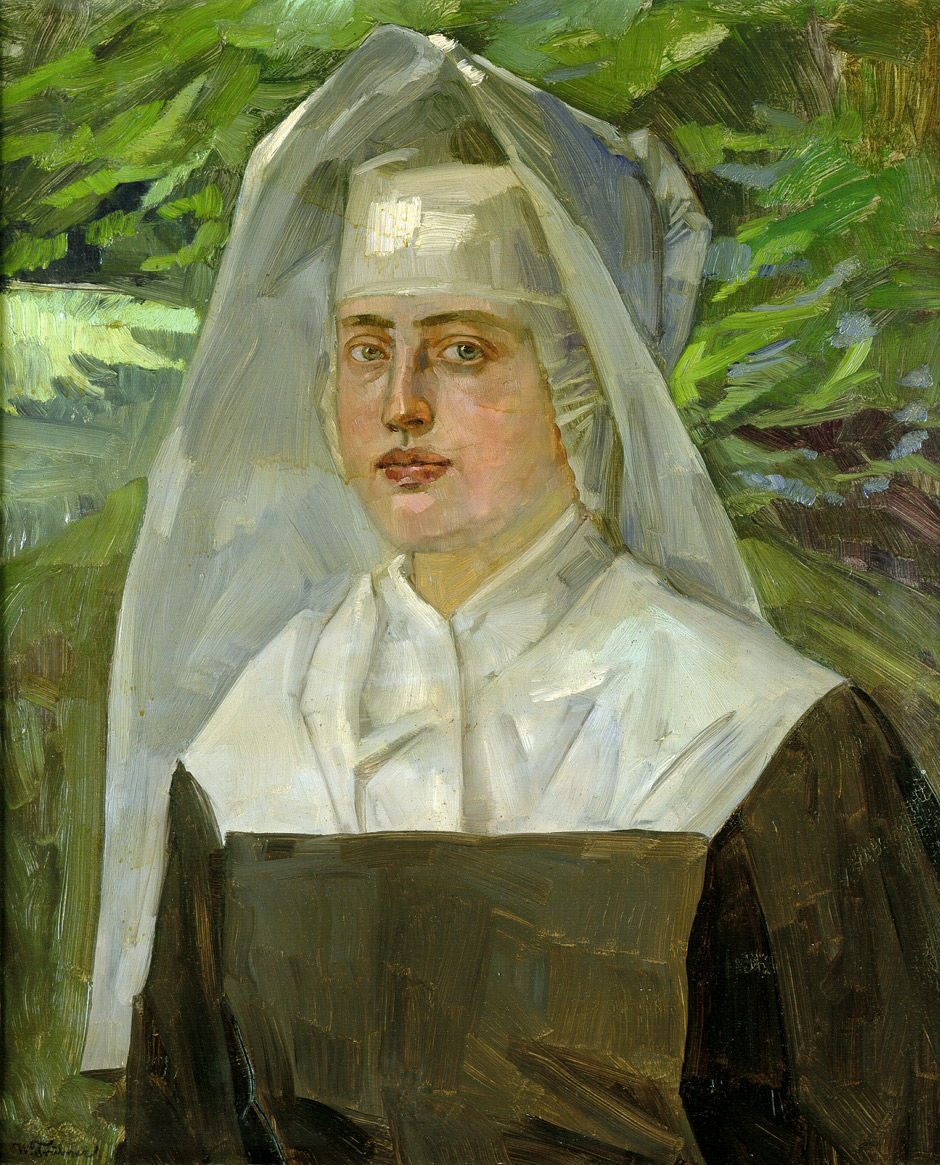
Portrait of a Nun in a Summer Garden (ca. 1900)

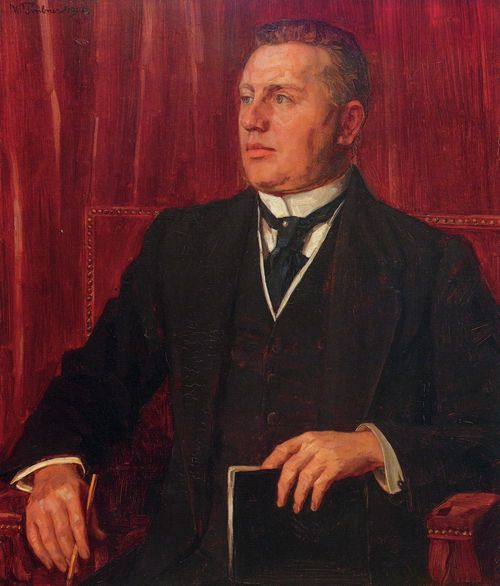
Karl Haberstock (1914)

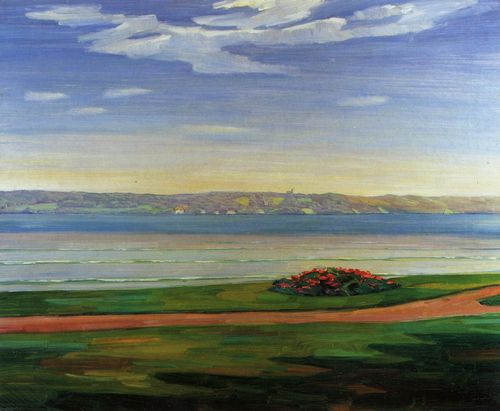
Aussichtsplatz am Starnberger See (1911)
