= Grafling =

- Municipality
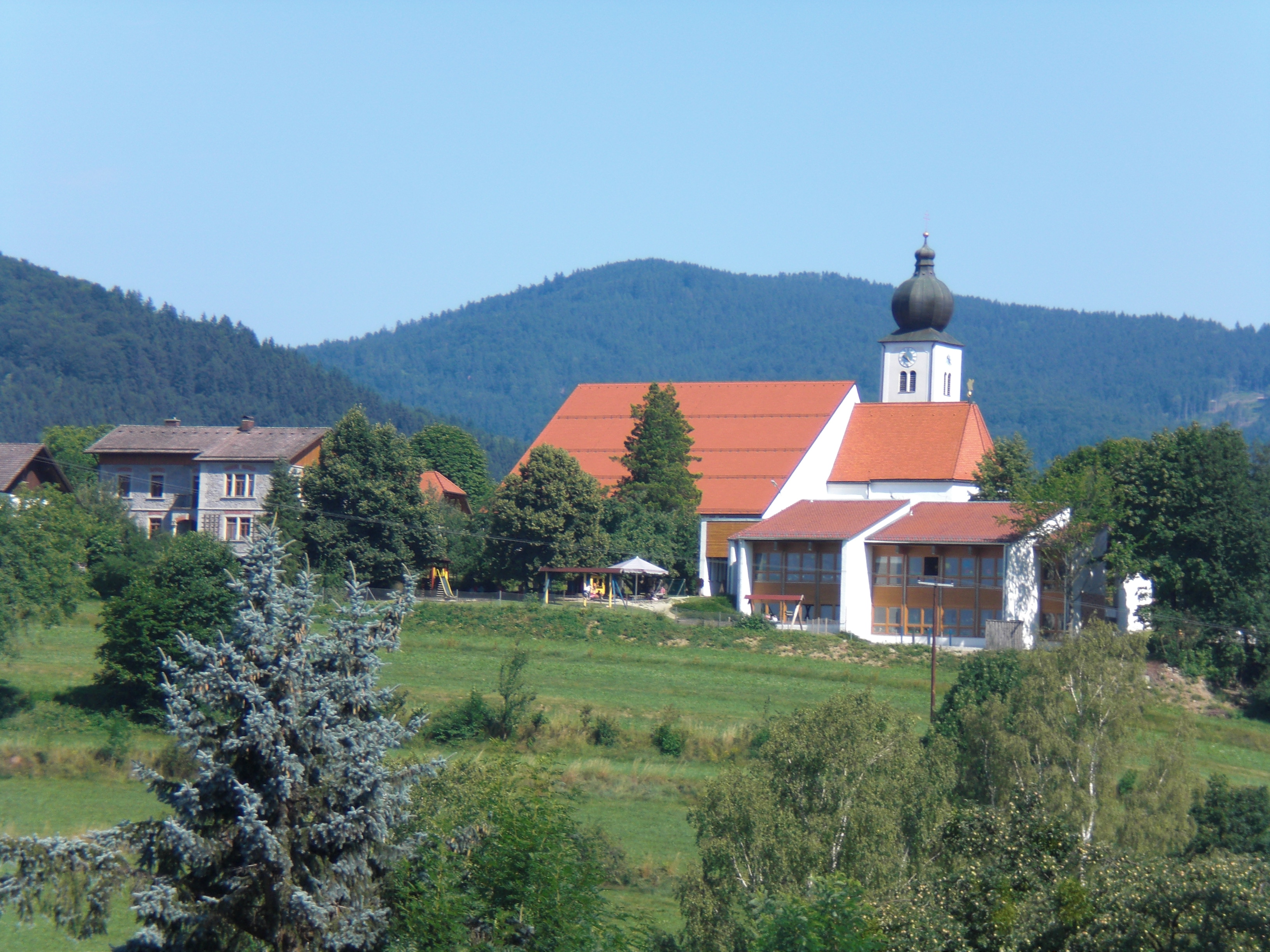
- Saint Andrew Church

- Coat of arms

- Location of Grafling within Deggendorf district
- Interactive map of Grafling
- Location within Germany Location within Bavaria
- Coordinates: 48°54′N 12°59′E
- Country: Germany
- State: Bavaria
- Admin. region: Niederbayern
- District: Deggendorf

Government
  - Mayor (2020–26): Anton Stettmer (CSU)

Area
  - Total: 46.28 km^{2} (17.87 sq mi)
- Elevation: 433 m (1,421 ft)

Population (2025-12-31)
  - Total: 2,708
  - Density: 58.51/km^{2} (151.5/sq mi)
- Time zone: UTC+01:00 (CET)
  - Summer (DST): UTC+02:00 (CEST)
- Postal codes: 94539
- Dialling codes: 0991
- Vehicle registration: DEG
- Website: www.grafling.de

Grafling is a municipality in the district of Deggendorf in Bavaria in Germany.

== Geography ==
Grafling lies in the Danube Forest Planning Region (Planungsregion Donau-Wald). Its lowest point is in Großtiefenbach at 326 m above sea level (NN). The highest points of the municipality are the Steinberg (999 m), the Geißriegel (1,043 m), the Dreitannenriegel (1,090 m) and the Einödriegel (1,121 m) which rise above the valley of the Graflinger Tal to the east. To the north the valley ends at the Hochberg (727 m), to the west it is guarded by the Butzen (775 m) and the Vogelsang (1,022 m) in the municipality of Bernried. To the south the valley opens up towards Deggendorf, the Danube Plain, and the Gäuboden.
