= Upper Palatine-Bavarian Forest =

Region in Germany

The Upper Palatine-Bavarian Forest (German: Oberpfälzisch-Bayerische Wald), (no. D63 or 40) is a natural region in Germany in the northeast of Bavaria. It mainly comprises the low mountain ranges of the Bavarian Forest and Upper Palatine Forest which are up to 1456 m high and border on the Bohemian Massif immediately inside the Czech Republic's southwestern border with Germany.

== Division into geographical units ==
- 40 (=D63) Upper Palatine-Bavarian Forest
  - 400 Upper Palatine Forest - East
  - 401 Upper Palatine Forest - West
  - 402 Cham-Furth Depression
  - 403 Bavarian Forest - North
  - 404 Regen Depression
  - 405 Bavarian Forest - South
  - 406 Falkensteiner Vorwald
  - 407 Lallinger Winkel
  - 408 Passau Abteiland and Neuburg Forest
  - 409 Wegscheid Plateau

Neighbouring main unit groups are:

- 39 (= D48) Thuringian-Franconian Highlands
- 08 (= D61) Franconian Jura
- 07 (= D62) Upper Palatine-Upper Main Hills
- 06 Lower Bavarian Hills (part of D65)

== Literature ==
- Meynen, Emil (ed.) Handbuch der naturräumlichen Gliederung Deutschlands. Selbstverlag der Bundesanstalt für Landeskunde, Remagen 1953-1962 (Teil 1, enthält Lieferung 1-5), ISBN B0000BJ19E
- Meynen, Emil (ed.) Handbuch der naturräumlichen Gliederung Deutschlands. Selbstverlag der Bundesanstalt für Landeskunde, Remagen 1959-1962 (Teil 2, enthält Lieferung 6-9), ISBN B0000BJ19F
