= Regen Depression =

River valley in Bavaria

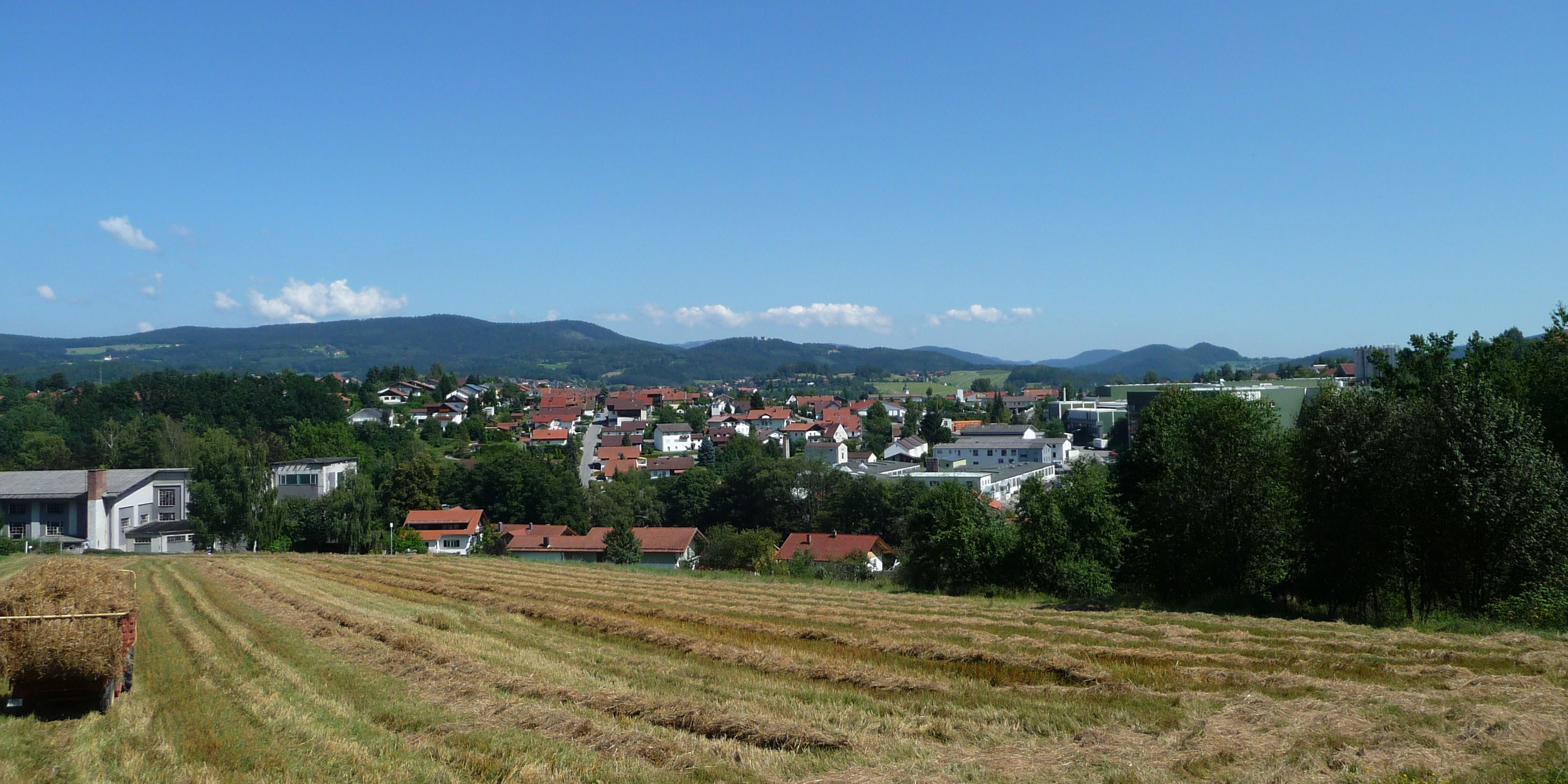
Countryside near Viechtach

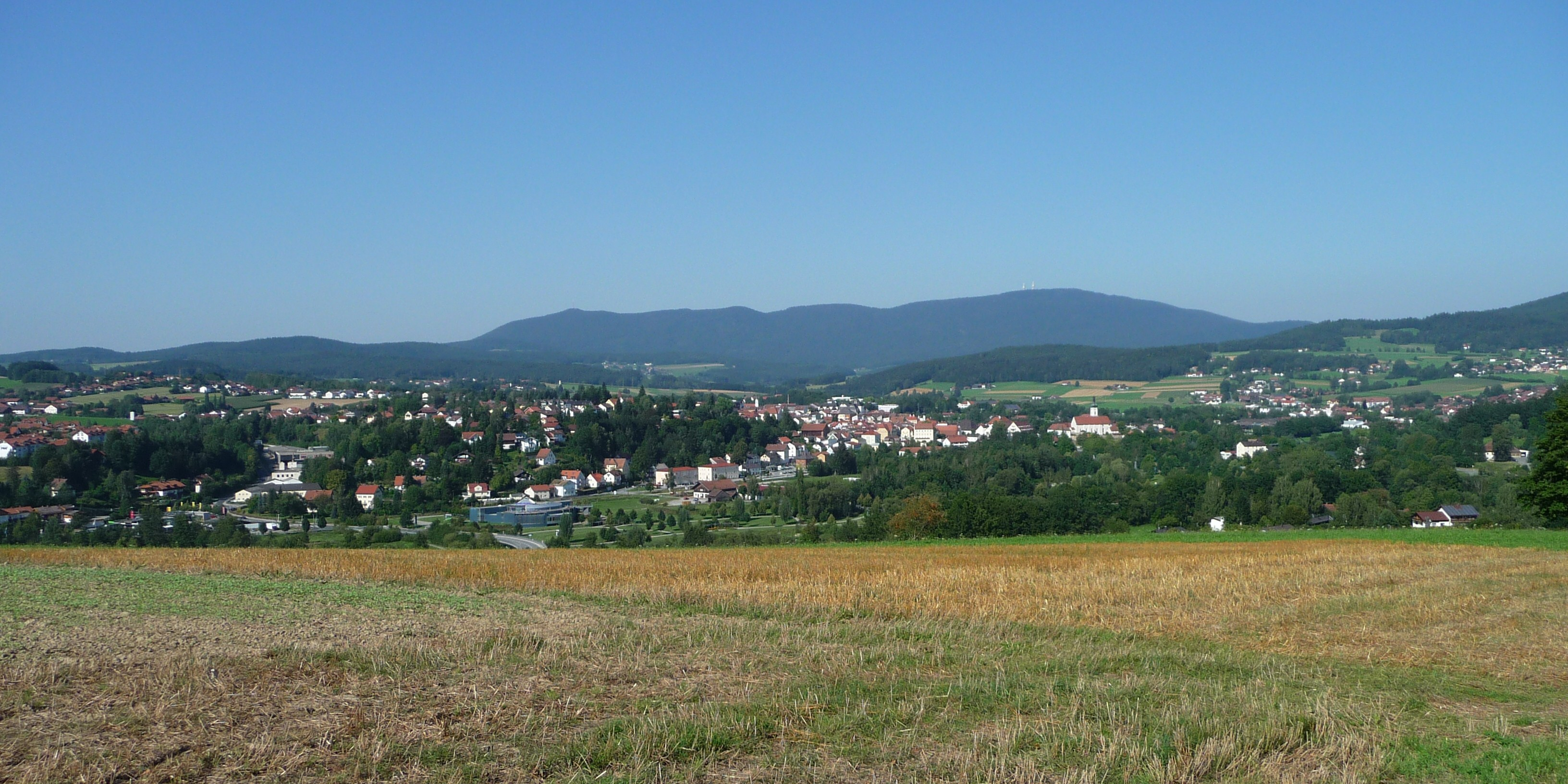
Countryside near Bad Kötzting

The Regen Depression (German: Regensenke) is a wide river valley in the Bavarian Forest along the River Regen.

As natural region major unit no. 404 the Regen Depression belongs to the Upper Palatine-Bavarian Forest and covers an area of 667 km^{2}. It separates the Anterior Bavarian Forest in the southwest from the High Bavarian Forest in the northeast. In the northwest it is adjoined by the Cham-Furth Depression and, in the southeast, the Abteiland.

The Regen Depression is a large region, divided into various basins, at a height of 600 to 700 metres above sea level. The Regen flows through this gently rolling terrain in large curves. The river is impounded at the Regener See, Höllensteinsee and Blaibacher See. Heavily eroded, strongly weathered gneisses and granites are common. These are remains of weathered Tertiary platforms and Pleistocene solifluction soils.

Compared to other areas of the Bavarian Forest, the climate is relatively mild. At 800 to 1200 mm per year, precipitation is lower than on the surrounding mountain ranges and temperatures are higher during the growing season. In winter, however, pockets of cold air are formed in the valleys.

The area is a wooded, increasingly intensively farmed agricultural landscape characterized by grassland. Throughout its length, the Regen is traversed by the Bavarian Pfahl, an unusual geological structure. The largest settlements are the towns of Regen, Viechtach and Bad Kötzting.

Much of the landscape is near-natural, especially the around the river, but also parts of the Pfahl with its pine and birch stands. Otherwise grassland dominates, while the hillsides are mainly covered with spruce. The original beech and fir forests have been reduced to small remnants between the farmland and grassland on steeply sloping terrain. Most of the Regen Depression lies within the Bavarian Forest Nature Park, the northwestern part belongs to the Upper Bavarian Forest Nature Park.

== Literature ==
- Ulrich Pietrusky, Günther Michler, Donatus Moosauer: Niederbayern – im Fluge neu entdeckt, Verlag Morsak, Grafenau, 2nd edn. 1982, ISBN 3-87553-135-3
