= Falkensteiner Vorwald =

The Falkensteiner Vorwald is the gently rolling westernmost part of the Bavarian Forest in northern Lower Bavaria and southern Upper Palatinate in the German state of Bavaria.

== Geography ==
=== Location ===
The Falkensteiner Vorwald with the market town of Falkenstein in the centre, extends southwards to immediately in front of the Danube with Deggendorf in the far southeast, Straubing roughly to the south and Regensburg immediately southwest. Its western and northwestern extent is roughly marked by the valley of the River Regen, in the extreme northwest extending as far as Maxhütte-Haidhof, Nittenau and, in the north, to Roding.

It is adjoined to the west-northwest by the Danube Hills. To the southwest it borders on the northwestern edge of the Regen Depression, to the southeast on the Upper Palatine Hills, to the east on the Central Franconian Jura and, to the north, on the Dungau.

== Sources ==
- Emil Meynen, Josef Schmithüsen (editors): Handbuch der naturräumlichen Gliederung Deutschlands. Bundesanstalt für Landeskunde, Remagen/Bad Godesberg, 1953–1962 (9 issues in 8 books, updated map at 1:1,000,000 scale with major units, 1960).
- Dietrich-Jürgen Manske: Geographische Landesaufnahme: Die naturräumlichen Einheiten auf Blatt 164 Regensburg. Bundesanstalt für Landeskunde, Bad Godesberg 1981. → Online-Karte (PDF; 4,8 MB)
- Klaus Müller-Hohenstein: Geographische Landesaufnahme: Die naturräumlichen Einheiten auf Blatt 165/166 Cham. Bundesanstalt für Landeskunde, Bad Godesberg 1973. → online map (pdf; 4.4 MB)
- Willi Czajka, Hans-Jürgen Klink: Geographische Landesaufnahme: Die naturräumlichen Einheiten auf Blatt 174 Straubing. Bundesanstalt für Landeskunde, Bad Godesberg, 1967. → online map (pdf; 4.3 MB)
