= Alice Trübner =

German artist

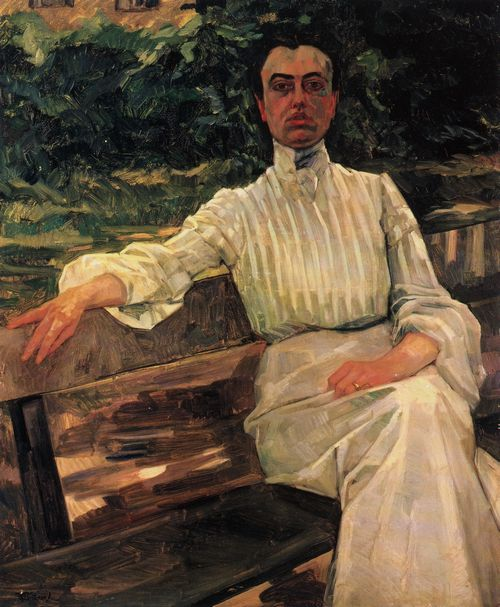
- portrait of Alice Trübner by Wilhelm Trübner
- Born: Alice Auerbach; 24 August 1875; Bradford, England
- Died: 20 March 1916 (aged 40); Berlin, Germany
- Known for: Painting
- Movement: German Expressionism
- Spouse: Wilhelm Trübner

Alice Trübner (1875–1916) was a German artist.

== Biography ==
Trübner née Auerbach was born on 24 August 1875 in Bradford, England. She was the wife of the painter Wilhelm Trübner (1851–1917). Trübner exhibited her work in Berlin. She died on 20 March 1916 in Berlin Germany.

Her work is in the collection of the collection of the Städel. Her work is also in the German Expressionism collection of the Museum of Modern Art. Specifically MoMA has two lithographs that were contributions to the weekly broadside Kriegszeit (Wartime) published by Paul Cassirer from 1914 through 1916.

== Gallery ==
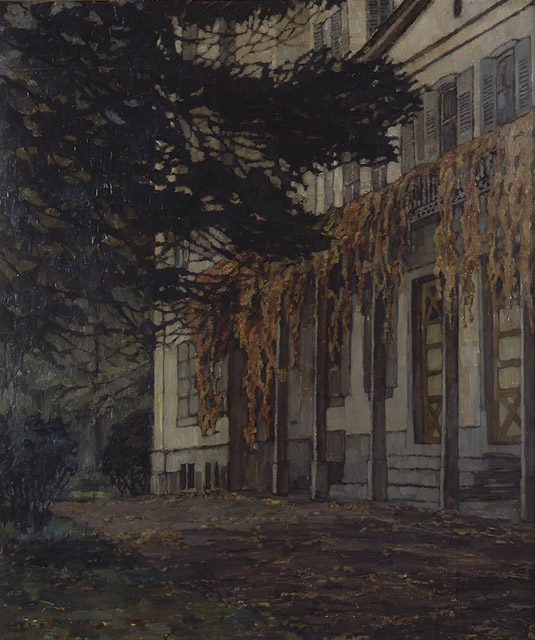
Hemsbach Castle near Weinheim

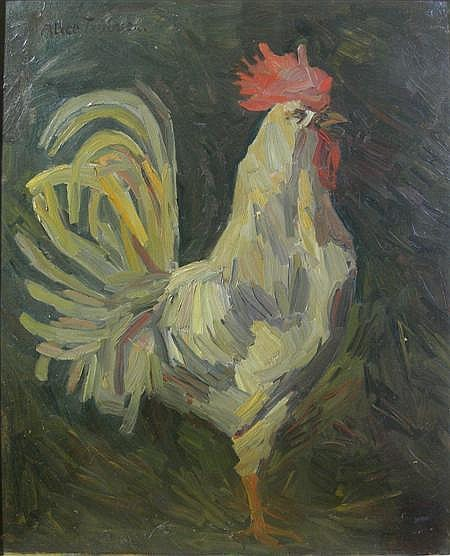
Rooster

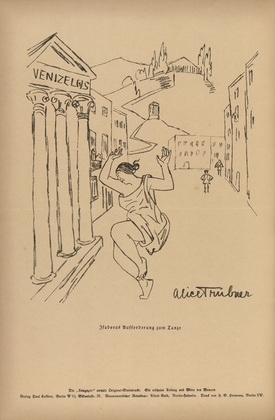
Isadora's Invitation to the Dance
