= Upper Palatine Hills =

Upper Palatine Hills (Oberpfälzisches Hügelland)

Dimensions
- Length: 100 km (62 mi)
- Area: 2,004.9 km^{2} (774.1 mi^{2})

Geography
- State(s): Upper Palatinate, Upper Franconia, Bavaria
- Range coordinates: 49°26′40″N 11°50′54″E
- Parent range: Upper Palatine-Upper Main Hills

Geology
- Rock age: c. 6 million years
- Rock type(s): various, mostly Rotliegendes or bunter sandstone

The Upper Palatine Hills (German: Oberpfälzisches Hügelland, also Oberpfälzisches Hügel- und Bergland or Oberpfälzer Bruchschollenland) is a Hercynian range of rolling hills (Hügelland) and valleys running from the Upper Palatine-Bavarian Forest in the (north-)east and the Franconian Jura in the (south-)west. It lies mostly within the Bavarian province of Upper Palatinate, hence the name. The range, which is oriented northwest to southeast, is about 100 kilometres long, but only between 7 and 35 kilometres wide and covers and area of 2,000 km^{2}. The best known settlements are (from northwest to southeast) Weiden (Ostrand), Amberg and Schwandorf.

== Sources and external links ==
- BfN landscape fact files:
  - Upper Palatine Hills
    - Grafenwöhr Training Area
    - Naab valley between Wernberg and Maxhütte (only partly in the Upper Palatine Hills)
- Map services of the Federal Agency for Nature Conservation
