= Dreitannenriegel =

Mountain in Bavaria, Germany

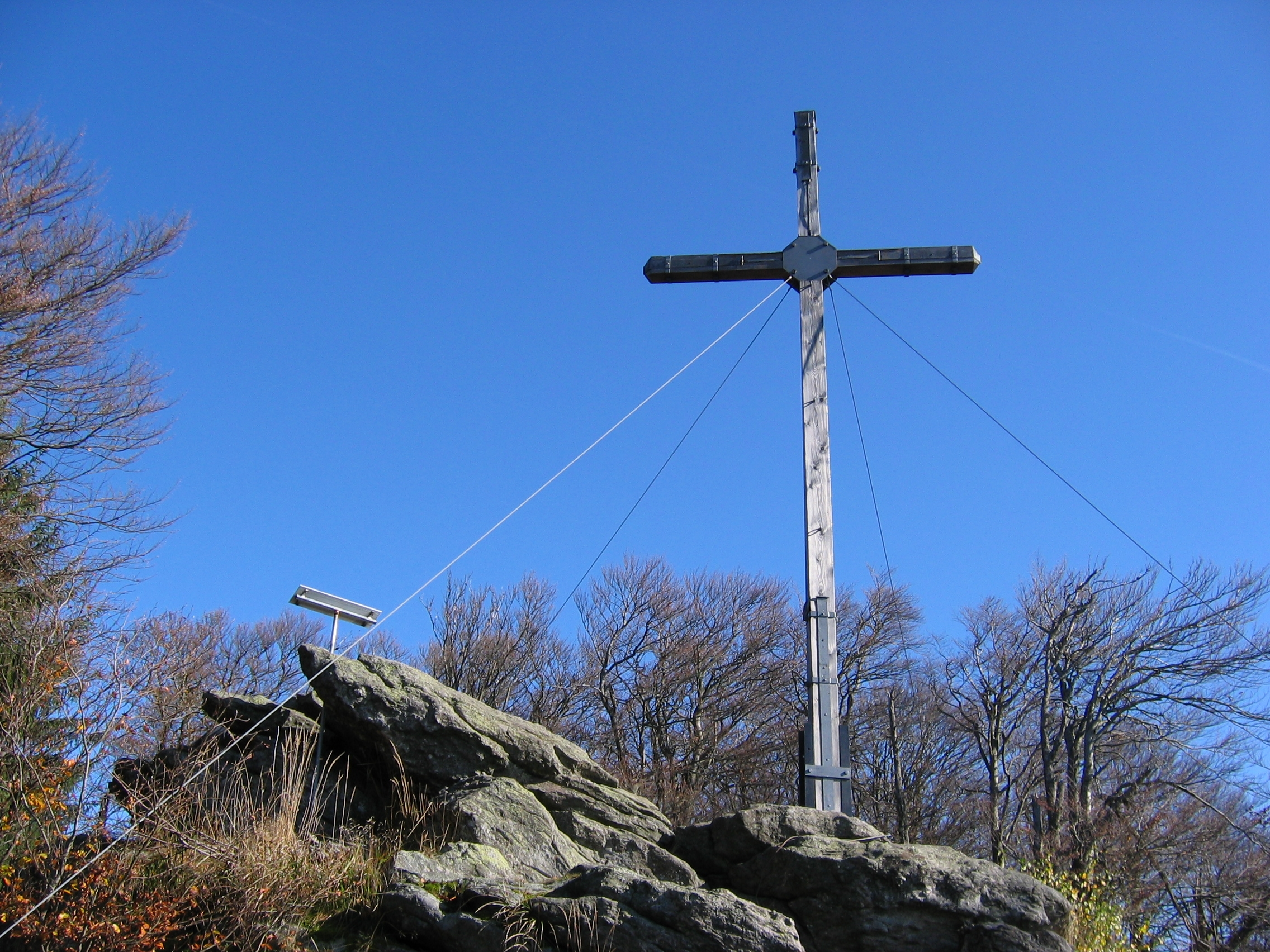
- Summit of the Dreitannenriegel

Highest point
- Elevation: 1,090.2 m (3,577 ft)
- Coordinates: 48°53′51″N 13°01′20″E

Geography
- Location within Bavaria
- Location: Deggendorf, Bavaria, Germany
- Parent range: Bavarian Forest

Geology
- Rock type: gneiss

The Dreitannenriegel is a mountain, 1,090.2 m above sea level (NHN), in the Bavarian Forest.

The mountain rises from the crest of the Anterior Bavarian Forest high above the Lower Bavarian county town of Deggendorf and lies in the municipality of Grafling. Nearby mountains are the Breitenauriegel, the Geißkopf and the Einödriegel.

At the summit is a large summit cross and a display board, that explains the panorama which extends over large parts of Lower Bavaria. On clear autumn days in föhn conditions the Bavarian Alps may also be visible.

Several footpaths lead to the Dreitannenriegel from Grafling, Gotteszell, Habischried, Bischofsmais and Rusel. One of the steepest ascents in the Anterior Bavarian Forest runs along Path 3 from Mietraching in Deggendorf up through the Sauloch to Rohrmünz (c. 45 minutes) and from there almost directly up the fall line to the top. This section should only be attempted with suitable footwear as, especially in the area of the summit, smooth rock faces have to be negotiated.

The summit and a large proportion of the mountainsides are part of the Special Area of Conservation called the Deggendorfer Vorwald.
