= Rödl =

Rödl or Roedl is a German surname. Notable people with the surname include:

- Arthur Rödl (1898–1945), German Nazi SS commandant of the Gross-Rosen concentration camp
- Georg Karl Rödl (1905–1964), German sculptor
- Ludwig Rödl (1907–1970), German chess master
- Henrik Rödl (born 1969), German basketball player
- Vojtěch Rödl, mathematician
- Sebastian Rödl, German professor of philosophy

== Other ==
- Rödl & Partner, a multidisciplinary professional services firm of German origin.
- Rodl, a small two-armed river (the Große and Kleine Rodl) that flows into the Danube at Ottensheim, Upper Austria.
  - Zwettl an der Rodl, a municipality on the Große Rodl river in Upper Austria.
