= Upper Palatine-Upper Main Hills =

The Upper Palatine-Upper Main Hills (German: Oberpfälzisch-Obermainisches Hügelland), also called the Upper Palatine-Upper Main Hills and Uplands (Oberpfälzisch-Obermainisches Hügel- und Bergland) form a landscape of low, rolling hills between the Franconian Jura in the southwest and (from northwest to southeast) the Franconian Forest, Fichtel Mountains and Upper Palatine Forest in the northeast.

The region runs from northwest to southeast and is about 170 kilometres long, but only 7 to 35 kilometres wide and lies mainly in the Bavarian administrative provinces of Upper Franconia and Upper Palatinate; small elements, however, also lie within the Thuringian county of Sonneberg. Its best known settlements are (from northwest to southeast) Sonneberg (in the extreme northeast), Kulmbach, Marktzeuln near Lichtenfels (at the northwest edge), Bayreuth, Weiden (Ostrand), Amberg and Schwandorf.

== Natural region classification ==
The Upper Palatine-Upper Main Hills are, according to the Handbook of the Natural Region Divisions of Germany, a natural region major unit group. They are generally seen as part of the South German Scarplands, but there are also levels, which it - just as with the major landscapes and hill regions bordering it to the southwest and northeast - covers as an independent "2nd order major landscape".

The Upper Palatine-Upper Main Hills is subdivided into major units (three figures) as follows:

- 07 (=D62) Upper Palatine-Upper Main Hills
  - 070 Upper Palatine Hills
  - 071 Upper Main Hills

The dividing line between the two landscapes is mainly the watershed between the Main (north) and Naab (south).

The Upper Palatine Hills contain practically all the rock periods between the Permian and the current period, whilst the surface rocks of the Upper Main Hills are predominantly of Black and Brown Jurassic.
