= Geißkopf =

Mountain in Germany

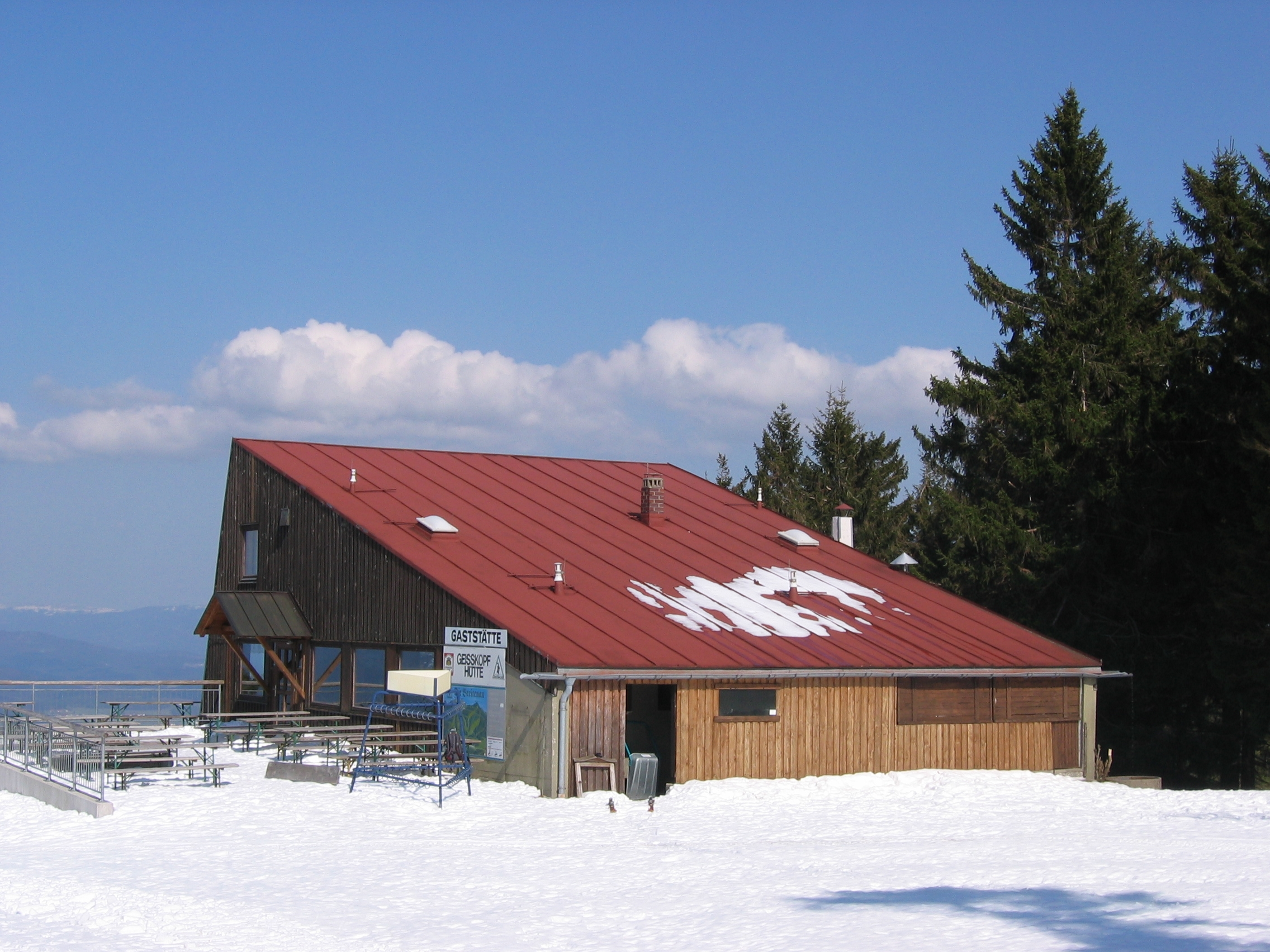
- The Geißkopf Hut

Highest point
- Elevation: 1,097.4 m above sea level (NHN) (3,600 ft)
- Listing: Geißkopf Tower (viewing tower)
- Coordinates: 48°55′29″N 13°2′17″E

Geography
- Location within Bavaria
- Location: Regen, Bavaria, Germany
- Parent range: Bavarian Forest

Geology
- Rock type: gneiss

The Geißkopf is a mountain, 1,097.4 m above sea level (NHN), in the Bavarian Forest in Germany.

== Location ==
The Geißkopf lies near the village of Bischofsmais in the Breitenau, a region to which Breitenauriegel, Dreitannenriegel and Einödriegel also belong.

== Tourism ==
The mountain has been managed since the 1960s as a local recreation area. As well as walking, there is a 1,142-metre-long chair lift which was opened in 1967/68, 3 long and 3 short drag lifts with 9 pistes as well as a sommerrodelbahn and winter toboggan runs. In the summer mountain bikes may be transported on the chair lift and there are 12 descents in the bike park. At the summit is a mountain restaurant and a 23-metre-high wooden observation tower, which enables a good, all-round view of the Rear Bavarian Forest. There is also a transmission antenna for broadcasting the radio programmes of "Unser Radio Regen" on 89.3 MHz with a transmit power of 200 W ERP. It is thus one of the few wooden towers that broadcasts radio programmes today.

A few hundred metres from the top is the Oberbreitenau, a formerly settled clearance. Today it is home to the Landshuter Haus, managed by the Bavarian Forest Club.

== Gallery ==
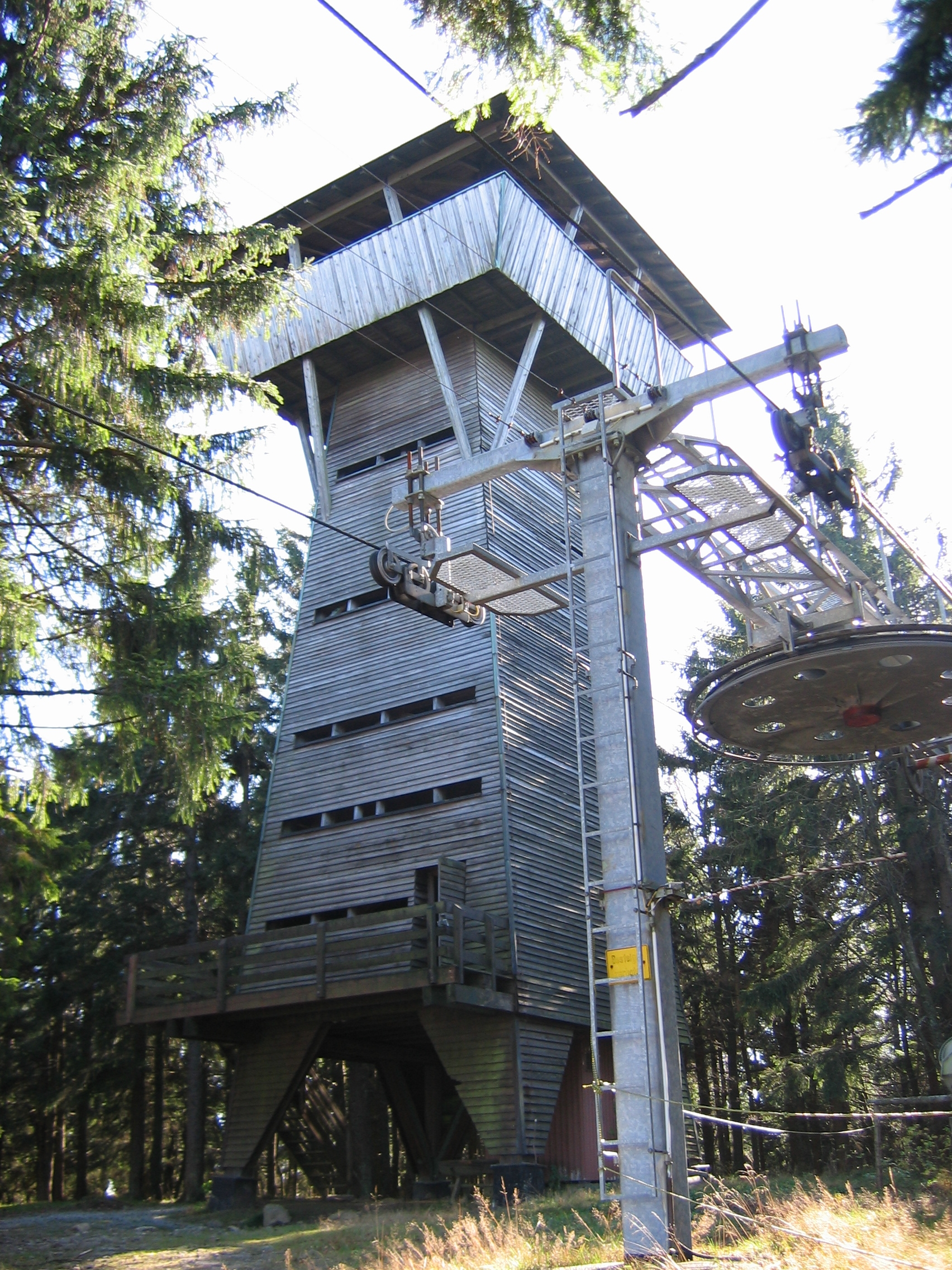
Viewing tower

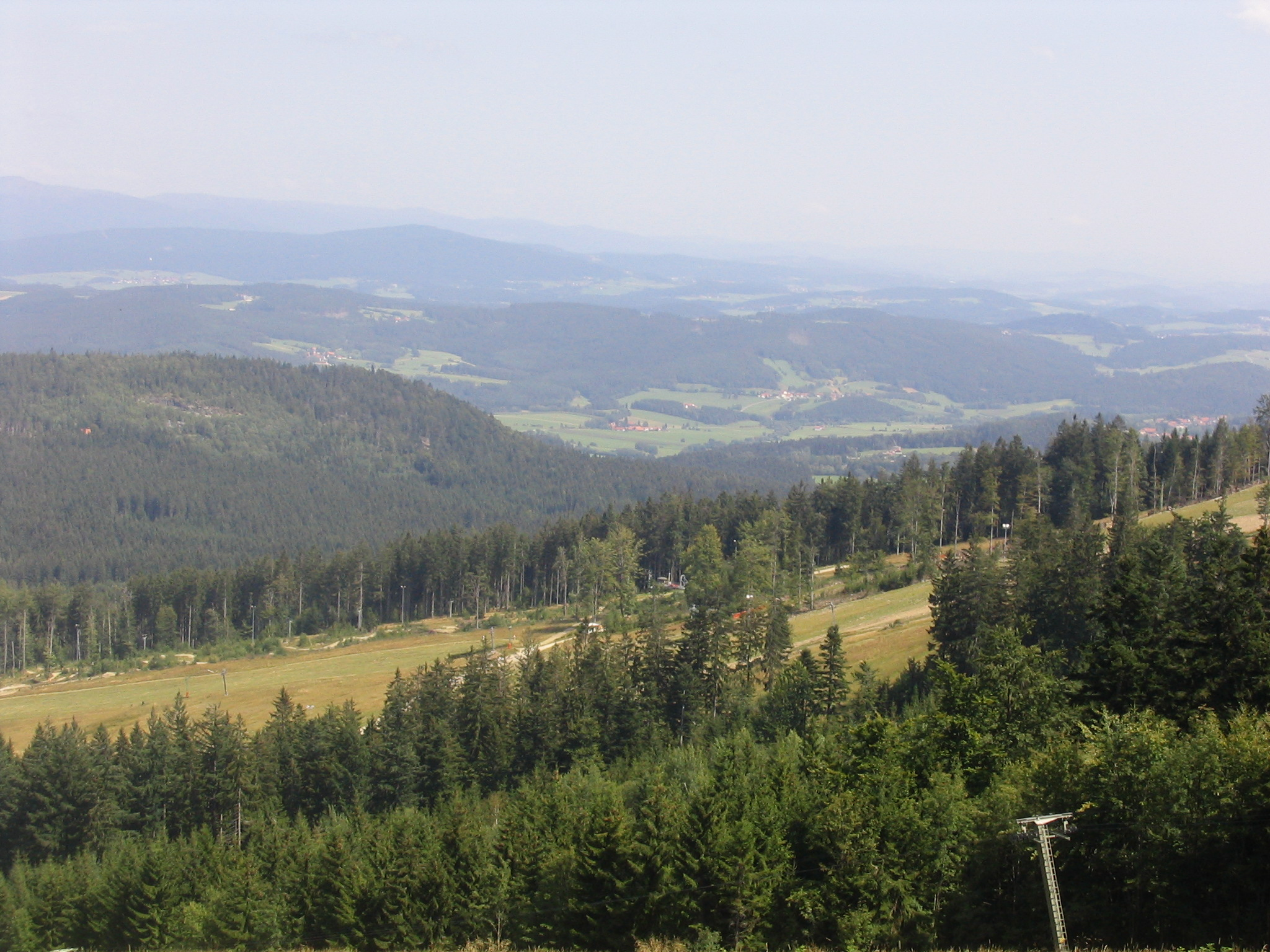
View from the Geißkopf

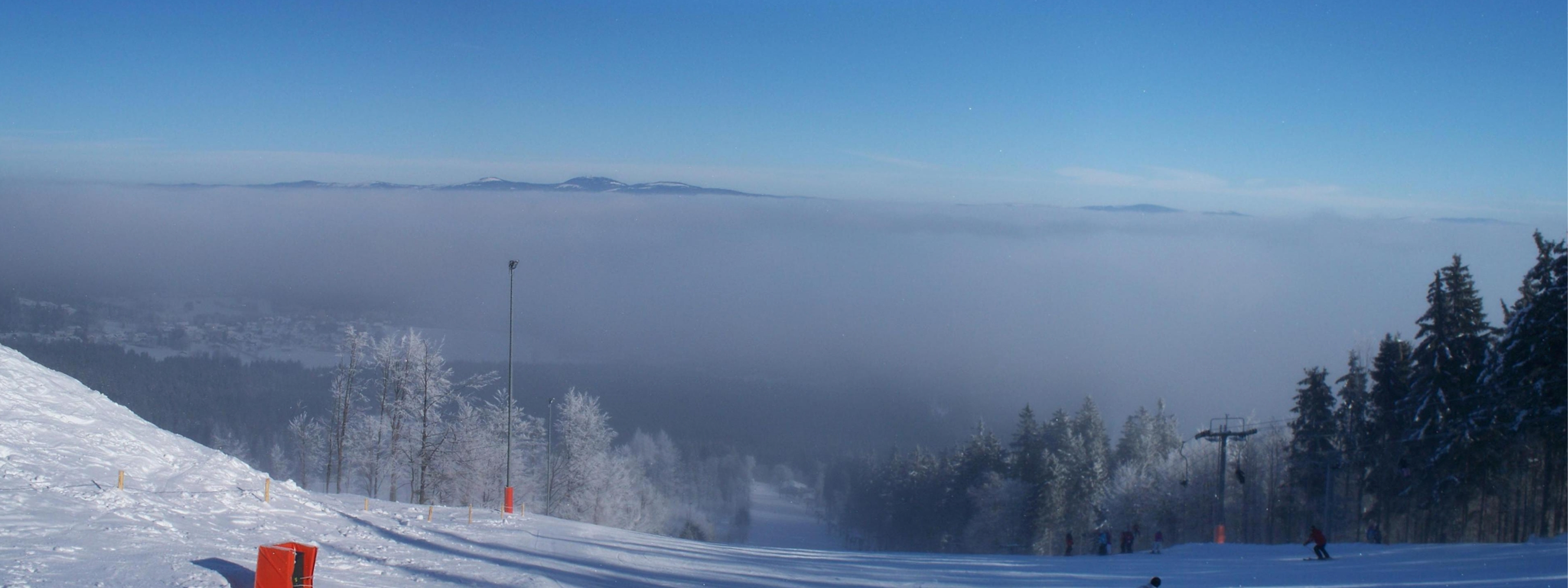
Winter tourism on the Geißkopf
