= Vogelsang (Bavarian Forest) =

Mountain in Germany

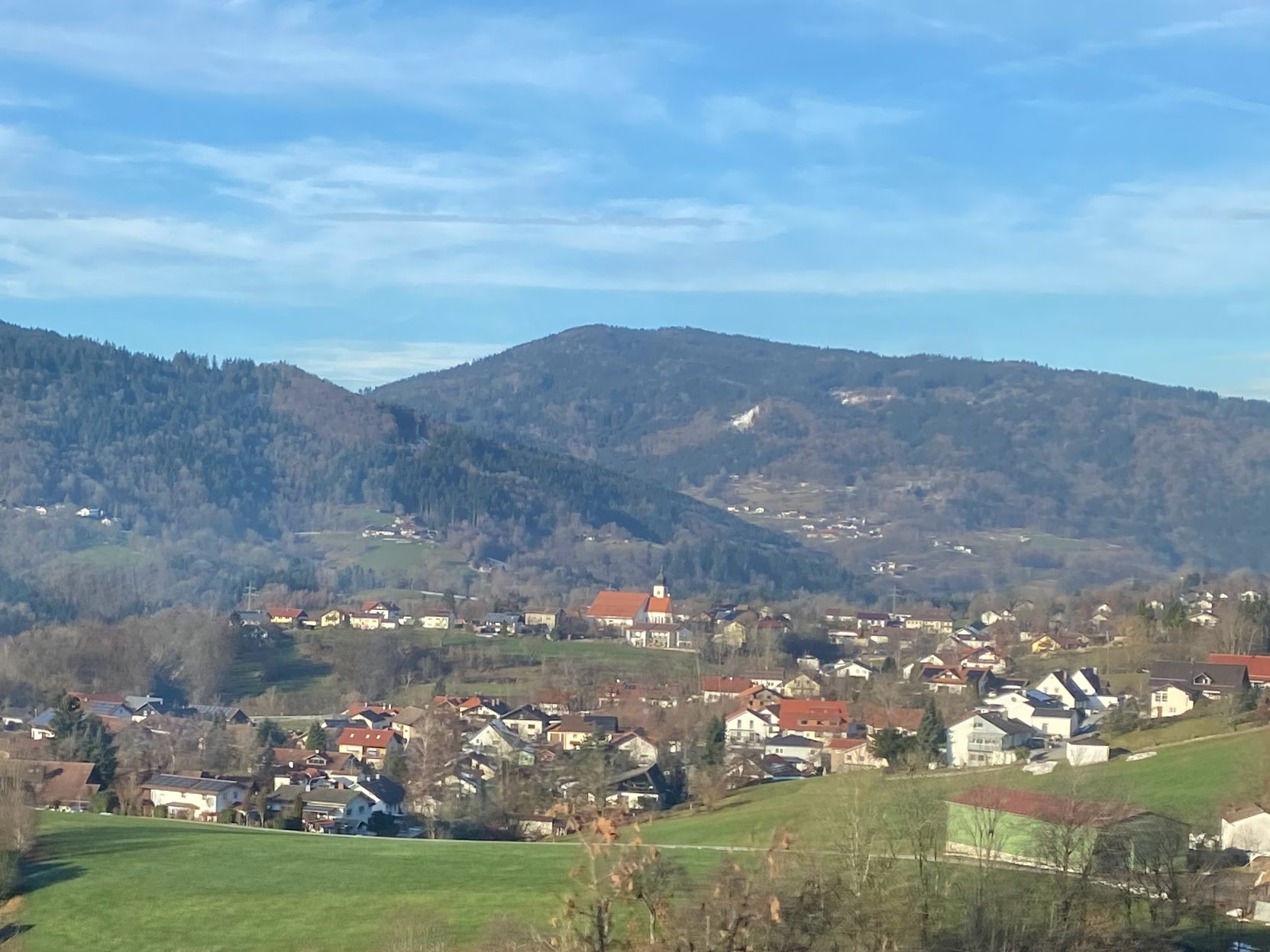
- Vogelsang as seen from Graflinger Valley

Highest point
- Coordinates: 48°56′06″N 12°56′37″E

Geography
- Location within Germany
- Location: Bavaria, Germany
- Parent range: Bavarian Forest

Geology
- Rock type(s): Gneiss, Granite

Vogelsang is a 1,022-metre-high (3,353 ft) mountain in Bavaria, Germany. It is located in the Bernried municipality, south-west of the Regen district and north-east of Deggendorf.

It lies in the western foothills of the Bavarian Forest. Along with Butzen (775 m or 2,543 ft) and Hinterberg (666 m or 2,185 ft), Vogelsang forms the boundary of the Graflinger Valley.

Other neighboring hills include Rauhe Kulm (1,050 m or 3,440 ft), Hochriedriegel (934 m or 3,064 ft), and Riedberg (998 m or 3,274 ft).
