= Breitenauriegel =

Mountain in Germany

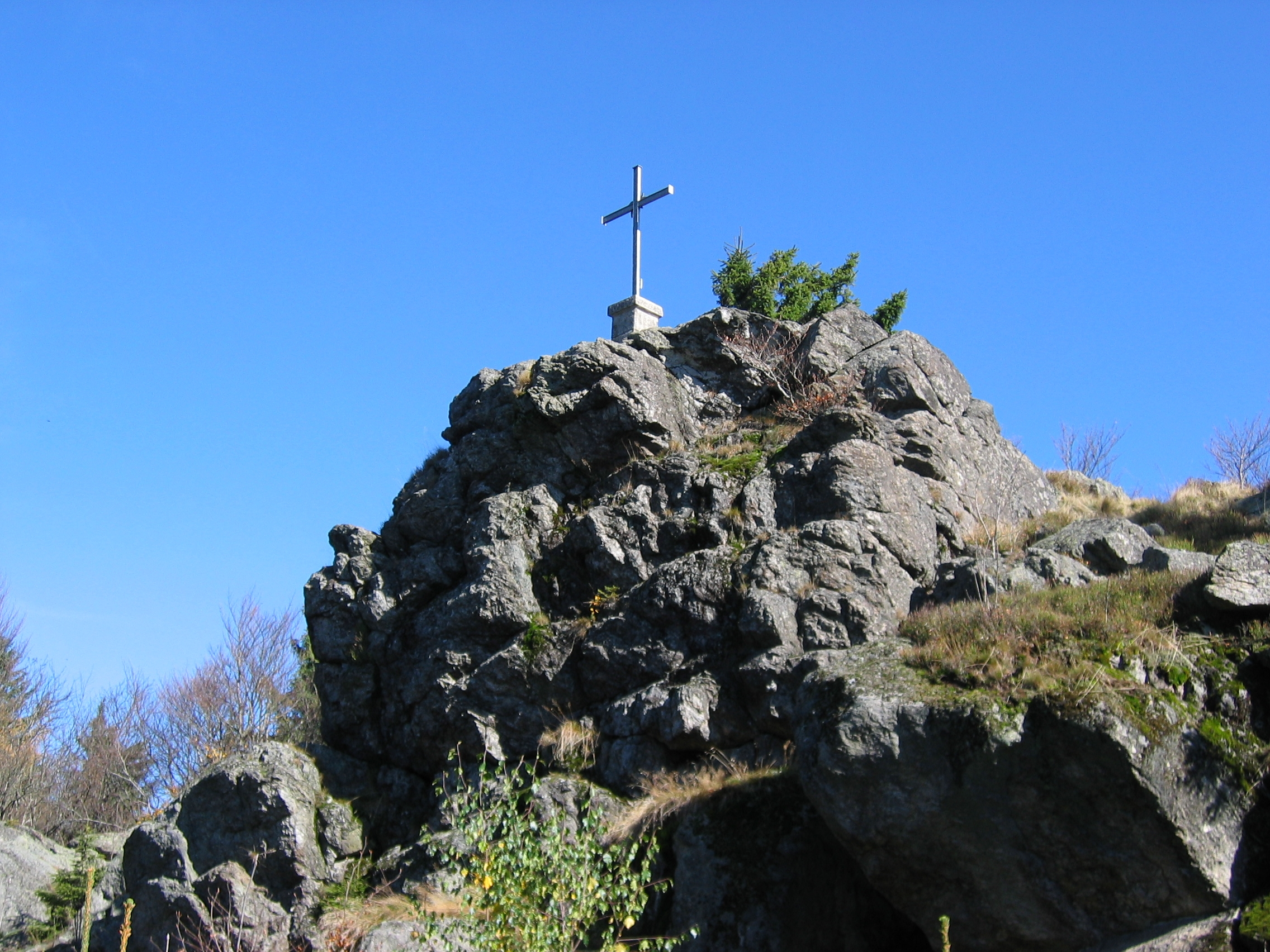
- The summit of the Breitenauriegel

Highest point
- Elevation: 1,116 m above sea level (NN) (3,661 ft)
- Coordinates: 48°54′23″N 13°01′48″E

Geography
- Location within Bavaria
- Location: Grenze Regen / Deggendorf, Bavaria, Germany
- Parent range: Bavarian Forest

Geology
- Rock type: gneiss

The Breitenauriegel (colloquially also called the Breitenauer Riegel) is a mountain in the Bavarian Forest of Germany.

The mountain is 1,116 m above sea level (NHN) high and rises from the crest of the Vorderer Bavarian Forest near Bischofsmais and the neighbouring summits of the Geißkopf and the Dreitannenriegel.

At the top is a summit rock with a summit cross and view looking northwest towards Gotteszell. North of the Breitenauriegel, towards, Geißkopf, is the plateau of Oberbreitenau. Various footpaths from Habischried, Bischofsmais, Rusel and Rohrmünz, including the Main-Danube Way with the Ostlinie make their way to the summit. About 750 metres southeast of the top is a works hut for the Deggendorf branch of the mountain rescue service, the Bergwacht.

The peak and most of the mountainsides are in the Special Area of Conservation called the Deggendorfer Vorwald.
