= Neuburg Forest =

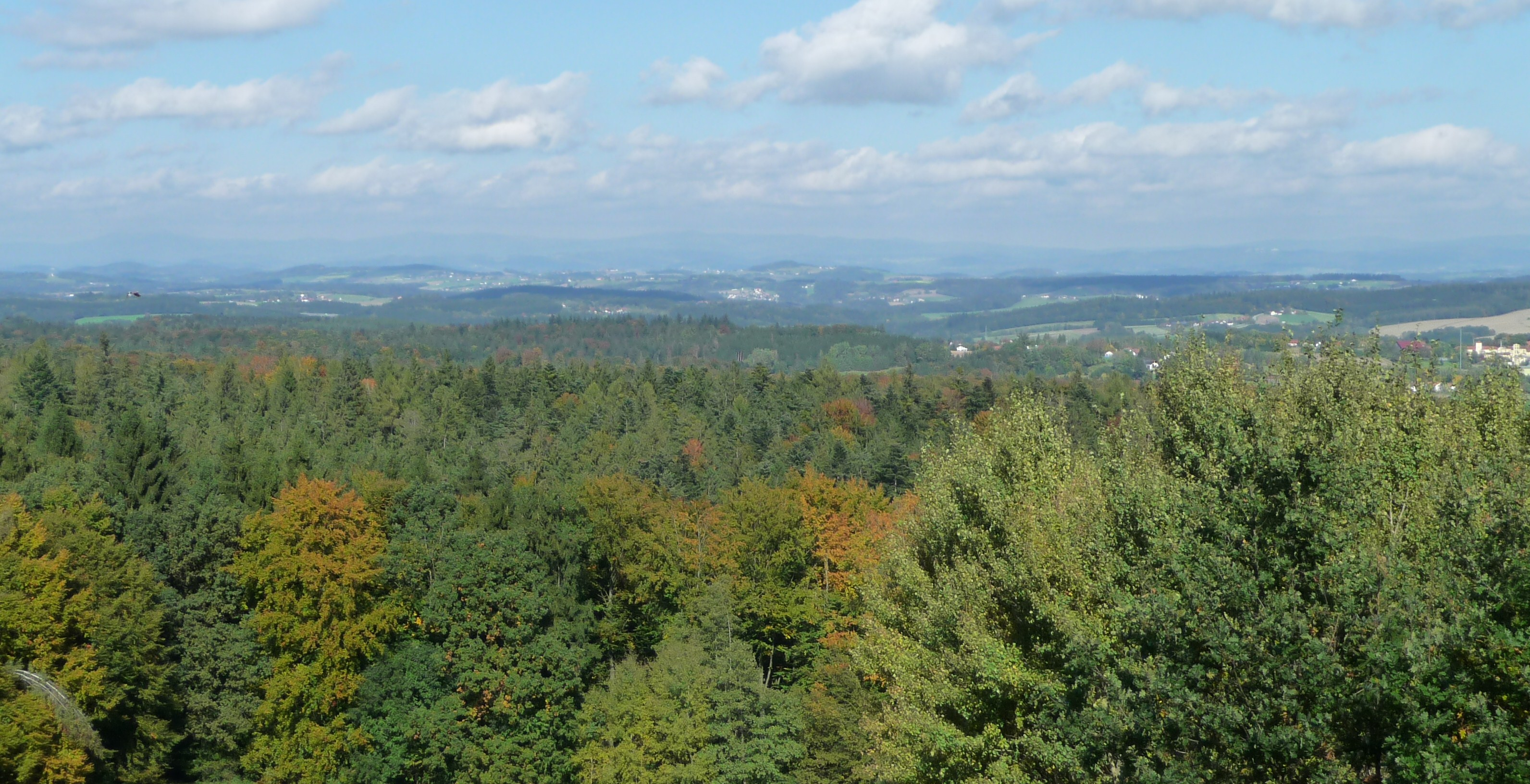
- View of the Neuburg Forest from the Platte (499 m). Behind: the mountains of the Bavarian Forest.

Highest point
- Peak: Platte
- Elevation: 499 m (1,637 ft)

Dimensions
- Length: 16 km (9.9 mi)
- Area: 186 km^{2} (72 mi^{2})

Naming
- Native name: Neuburger Wald

Geography
- State(s): west and south of Passau
- Range coordinates: 48°33′10″N 13°20′48″E
- Parent range: Bavarian Forest

Geology
- Rock type(s): granite, gneiss

The Neuburg Forest (German: Neuburger Wald) is a largely forested hill ridge and natural region in Lower Bavaria in the county of Passau and the borough of Passau. It is named after the village of Neuburg am Inn.

== Geography ==
The Neuburg Forest is actually a range of foothills of the Bavarian Forest on the far side of the Danube and thus forms a perimeter zone of the Bohemian Massif. It lies south of the Danube and extends for almost 30 kilometres from the lower Vils valley near Vilshofen to the lower Inn valley near Passau, and in the southeast to Neuburg am Inn. In the north lie the steep slopes of the Löwenwand near Seestetten (southern right bank of the Danube). The average width of the hill range is just under seven kilometres. The Neuburg Forest covers an area of 186 square kilometres. On Austrian territory east of the Inn, the Sauwald is its continuation. Taking that into account, the Danube has cut its way through the foothills of the Bavarian Forest for a total length of 70 km.

The Neuburg Forest is divided into three main regions: in a narrower sense, only the eastern third of this area is called the Neuburg Forest, with an area of about 60 km^{2}. The central part of the natural region is called Hochbuchet, while the western part, west of the Laufenbach, between Hochbuchet and Vils valley, has no special name. Also the Alkofen Heights left of the Vils are still counted as part of the natural region of the Neuburg Forest.

Most of the Neuburg Forest is located in the municipalities of Fürstenzell and Neuburg am Inn (from which the forest derives its name), as well as in the southern Passau districts of Heining. (where the Löwenwand is found), Haidenhof Nord and Haidenhof Süd. Its northwestern part west of the Lauterbach extends into the territory of the borough of Vilshofen (near Seestetten: Seestettner Holz with the 390-metre-high Hirschenberg).

The forested hill range has an average height of 400 to 475 metres, reaching its highest point at 499 metres above sea level at the summit of the Platte, a flat kuppe near the village of Altenmarkt in the municipality of Fürstenzell at 48°33′10″N 13°20′48″E. On the Platte is a water tower. The second highest point is only slightly lower at 498 metres; it is located in the Hochgasse woods on the county road, the Kreisstraße PA11 near the hamlet of Haunreut, in Fürstenzell, at 48°33′07″N 13°18′55″E.

The Neuburg Forest is composed of granite and gneisses. Especially on its northern and southwestern slopes, it is embedded in thick Pliocene and Pleistocene gravels.

== Literature ==
- Elmar Thumbach: Der Neuburger Wald, in: Der Bayerische Wald, Jubiläums-Heft 150 Jahre Naturwissenschaftlicher Verein Passau, 21st year, December 2008, pp. 88−95
- Ulrich Pietrusky, Günther Michler, Donatus Moosauer: Niederbayern – im Fluge neu entdeckt, Verlag Morsak Grafenau, 2nd edn. 1982, ISBN 3-87553-135-3
- Passauer Land, published by the House of Bavarian History (Haus der Bayerischen Geschichte), Augsburg, 2009 (Edition Bayern 1), Friedrich Pustet, 88 pages, ISBN 3791722387, ISBN 978-3791722382
