= Bernried =

- Municipality
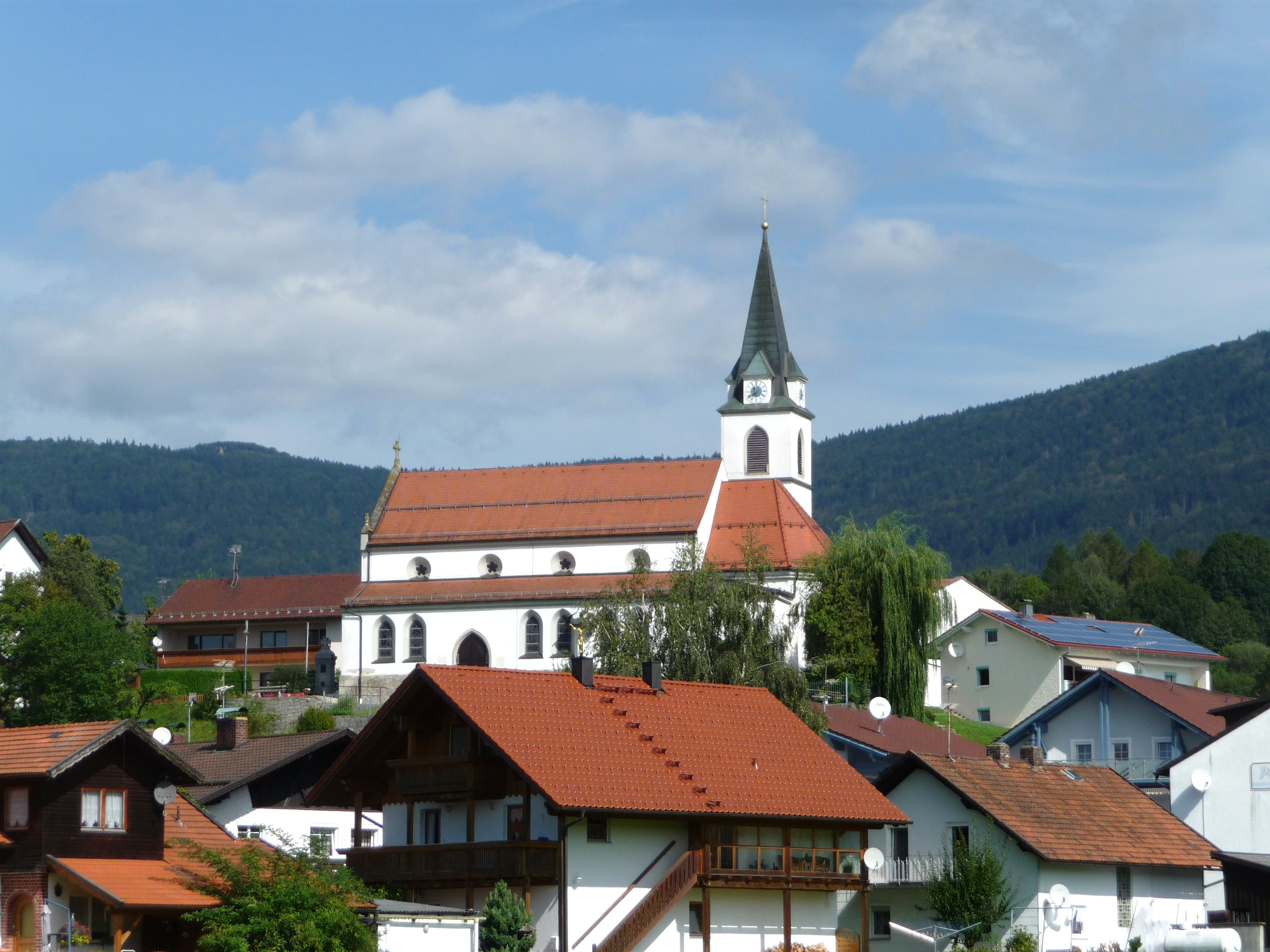
- Church of Saint Catherine

- Coat of arms

- Location of Bernried within Deggendorf district
- Interactive map of Bernried
- Location within Germany Location within Bavaria
- Coordinates: 48°55′N 12°52′E
- Country: Germany
- State: Bavaria
- Admin. region: Niederbayern
- District: Deggendorf
- Subdivisions: 2 Ortsteile

Government
  - Mayor (2020–26): Stefan Achatz (FW)

Area
  - Total: 39.47 km^{2} (15.24 sq mi)
- Elevation: 400–1,095 m (1,312–3,593 ft)

Population (2025-12-31)
  - Total: 4,815
  - Density: 122.0/km^{2} (316.0/sq mi)
- Time zone: UTC+01:00 (CET)
  - Summer (DST): UTC+02:00 (CEST)
- Postal codes: 94505
- Dialling codes: 08158
- Vehicle registration: DEG
- Website: bernried.de

Bernried is a municipality in the district of Deggendorf in Bavaria in Germany.
