= Bischofsmais =

- Municipality
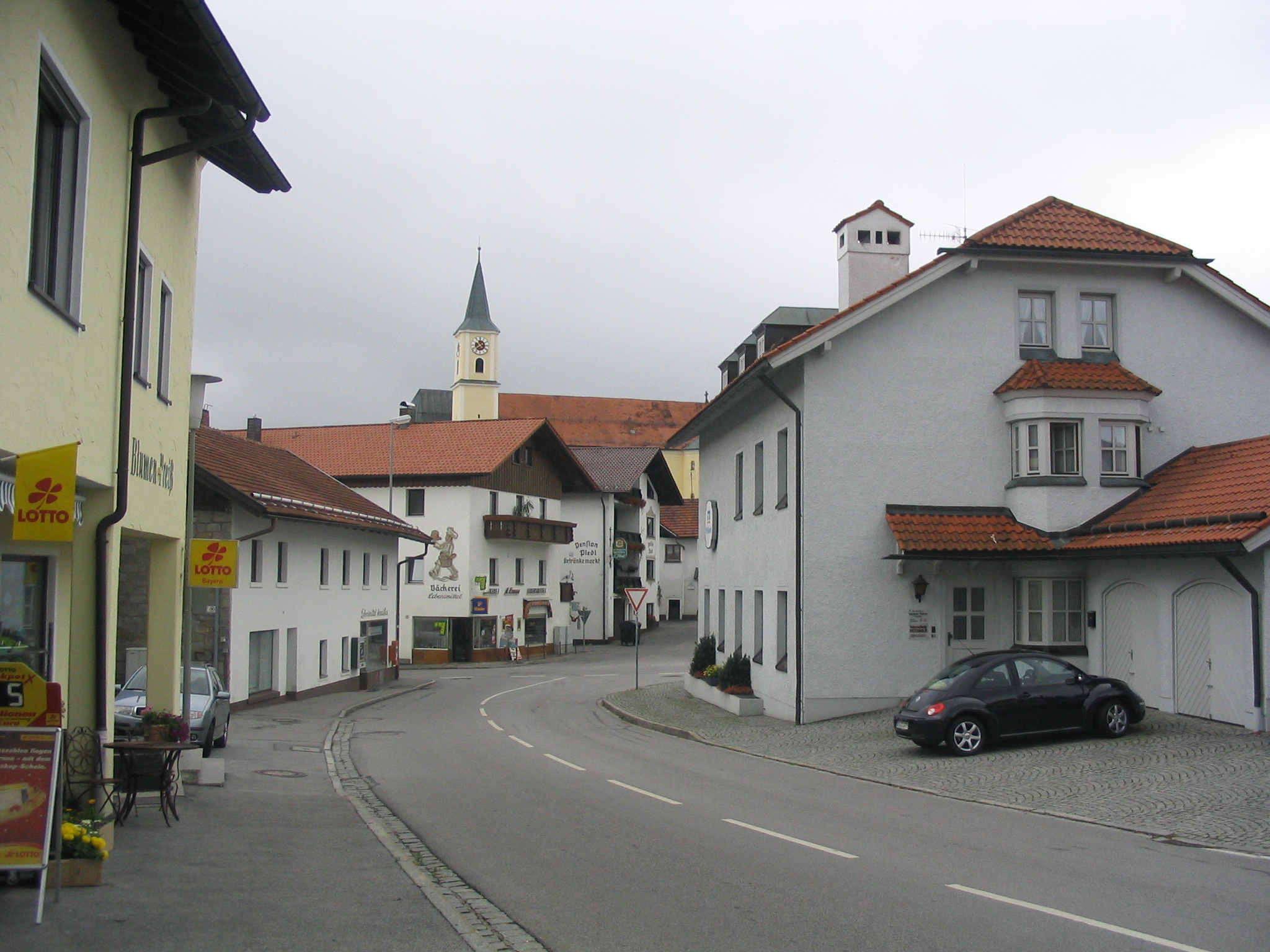
- Center of the village

- Coat of arms

- Location of Bischofsmais within Regen district
- Interactive map of Bischofsmais
- Location within Germany Location within Bavaria
- Coordinates: 48°55′N 13°5′E
- Country: Germany
- State: Bavaria
- Admin. region: Niederbayern
- District: Regen

Government
  - Mayor (2020–26): Walter Nirschl

Area
  - Total: 46.28 km^{2} (17.87 sq mi)
- Elevation: 682 m (2,238 ft)

Population (2025-12-31)
  - Total: 3,376
  - Density: 72.95/km^{2} (188.9/sq mi)
- Time zone: UTC+01:00 (CET)
  - Summer (DST): UTC+02:00 (CEST)
- Postal codes: 94253
- Dialling codes: 09920
- Vehicle registration: REG
- Website: www.bischofsmais.de

Bischofsmais (German pronunciation: [ˈbɪʃɔfsˌmaɪs]) is a municipality in the district of Regen, in Bavaria, Germany. It is well known for winter sports, especially cross-country skiing.
