= Lallinger Winkel =

Coordinates: 48.840000°N 13.120000°E

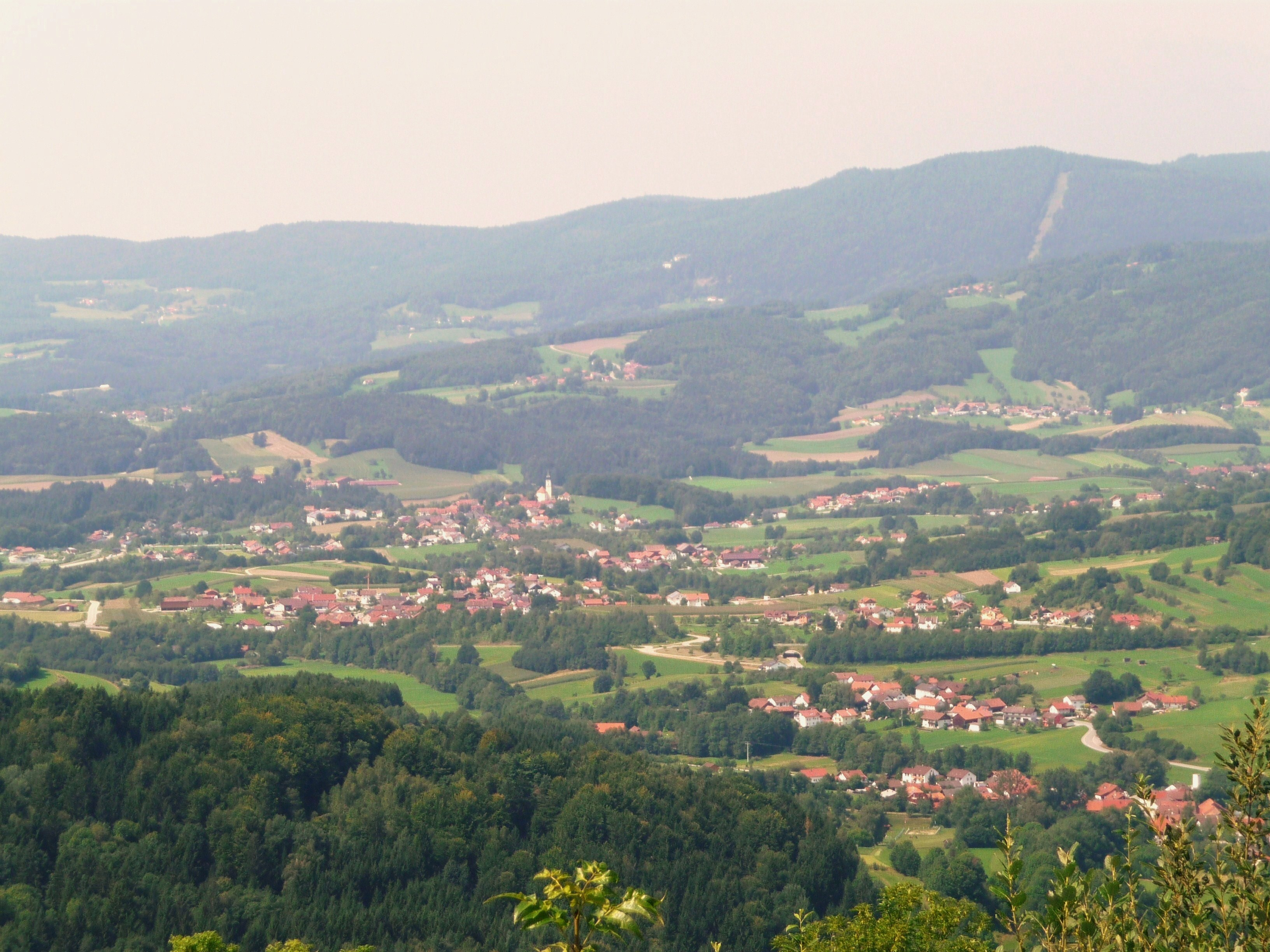
View from Langfurth over the Lallinger Winkel

The Lallinger Winkel is a high valley, 162 km² in area, named after the village of Lalling, in the county of Deggendorf in the Bavarian Forest, Germany.

The region opens into the Danube plain to the southeast but is delimited to the northwest, north and east by the mountain ridges of the Danube Hills which keep at bay the cold winds and rain. Apart from Lalling, the Lallinger Winkel also extends into the municipalities of Schaufling and Hunding.

In the south near Auerbach the Lallinger Winkel is adjoined by the Hengersberg-Schwanenkirchen Tertiary Bay. From a geological view, the region is a section of the southern Bohemian Massif. Its rocks include various gneisses and granites.

The region around Lalling was developed as early as the foundation phase of Niederaltaich Abbey in the 8th century. During the 150-year initial period of clearances, many villages were built in the Lallinger Winkel. The abbey used the favourable climatic conditions for orchards and encouraged the settlers to grow apples, pears and peaches.

From 1861 to 1904 Lalling was the centre of a district fruit nursery. Even today the Lallinger Winkel is characterised by orchards and is called the 'fruit basket of the Bavarian Forest' (Obstschüssel des Bayerischen Waldes). Many small villages grow the traditional scattered orchards (Streuobstwiesen). The initiative Scattered Orchards Beyond the Year 2000 (Streuobstanbau über das Jahr 2000) led to new plantings of thousands of standard fruit trees and the establishment of the freely accessible scattered orchard experience garden in Panholling, Hunding. Especially when the trees are in bloom or at harvest time, the orchards in the Lallinger Winkel are important for tourism. Also well known are the Lallingen snowdrop meadows (Lallinger Schneeglöckerlwiese) and spring snowflakes.
