= Hengersberger Ohe =

River in Germany

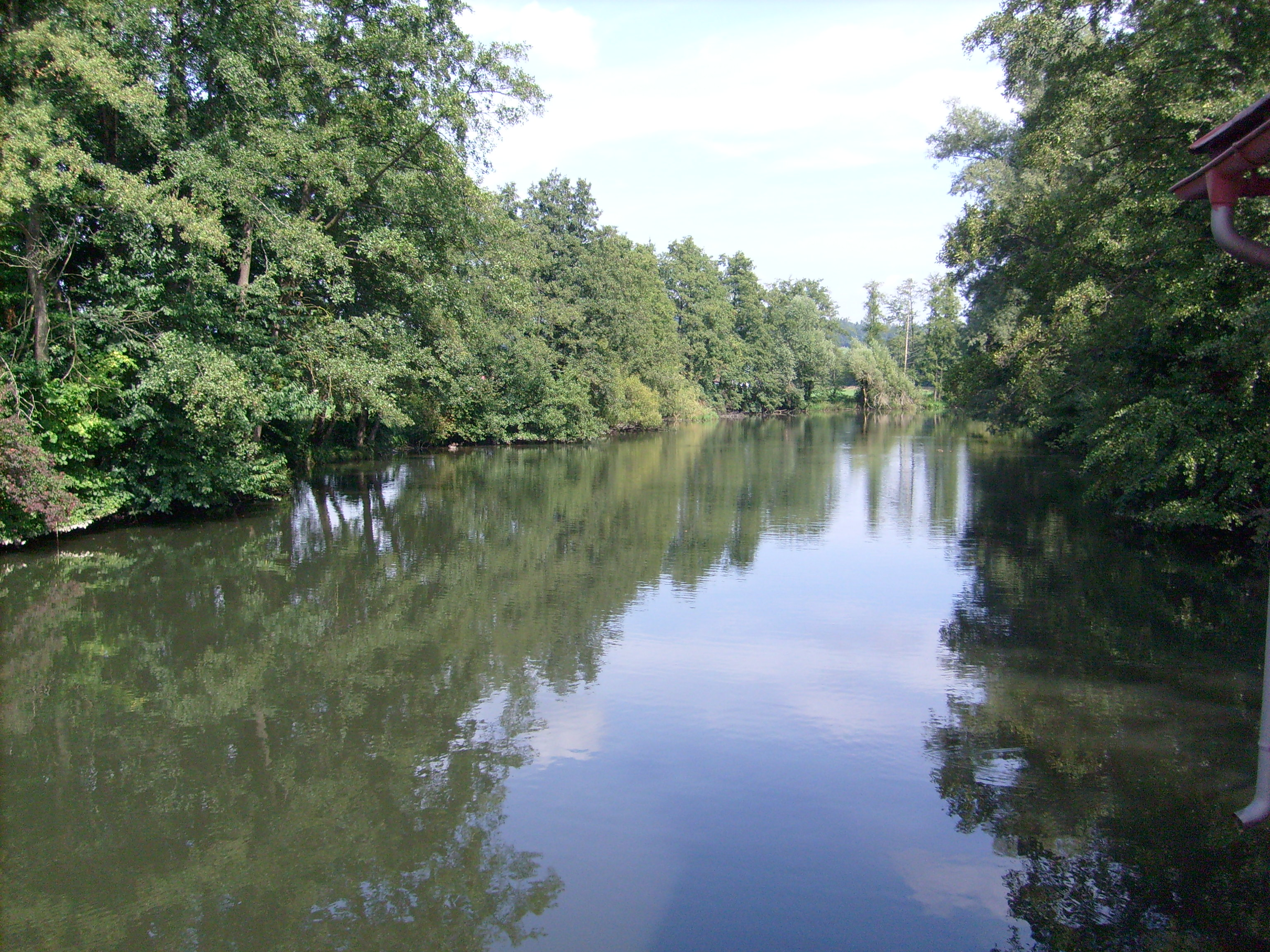
- The Ohe in Hengersberg

Location
- Country: Germany
- State: Bavaria

Physical characteristics
- Mouth
  - location: Danube
  - coordinates: 48.7183°N 13.0781°E
- Length: 33.7 km (20.9 mi)
- Basin size: 198 km^{2} (76 sq mi)

Basin features
- Progression: Danube→ Black Sea

Hengersberger Ohe (in its upper course: Ranzinger Bach) is a river of Bavaria, Germany. It flows into the Danube in Winzer.

== See also ==
- List of rivers of Bavaria
