= Arcobräu =

Brewery in Moos, Germany

Arcobräu Gräfliches Brauhaus
- Interactive map of Arcobräu Gräfliches Brauhaus
- Type: GmbH & Co. KG
- Location: Moos, Bavaria, Germany
- Coordinates: 48°44′47″N 12°57′36″E
- Opened: 1567
- Key people: Riprand Graf von und zu Arco-Zinneberg, Holger Fichtel
- Annual production volume: 160,000 hectolitres (140,000 US bbl)
- Employees: 91 (2016)
- Website: arcobraeu.de

Arcobräu is a brewery located in the Lower Bavarian municipality of Moos, Germany. The brewery has been owned by the family Arco-Zinneberg for 450 years. With an annual production volume of about 160,000 hectolitres (140,000 US bbl), it is among the larger breweries in Lower Bavaria. Their flagship beer is "Mooser Liesl", a Helles, meaning "Liesl from Moos".

== History ==
The first documented mention of the Schlossbrauerei Moos ("Palace Brewery of Moos") was in 1567. The company is based in Moos and exists in its current form since 1960, after a merger of several family-owned breweries. In the early 1990s, Arcobräu acquired several smaller breweries in Eastern Bavaria.

At the end of 2010, a dispute emerged between Arcobräu and the nearby town of Deggendorf pertaining to an additional beer tent at the Deggendorfer Volksfest, which culminated in corruption accusations against local elected officials. This dispute was referred to as the Bierkrieg ("Beer war") by the local media and continued into the first half of 2011.
