= Außernzell =

- Municipality
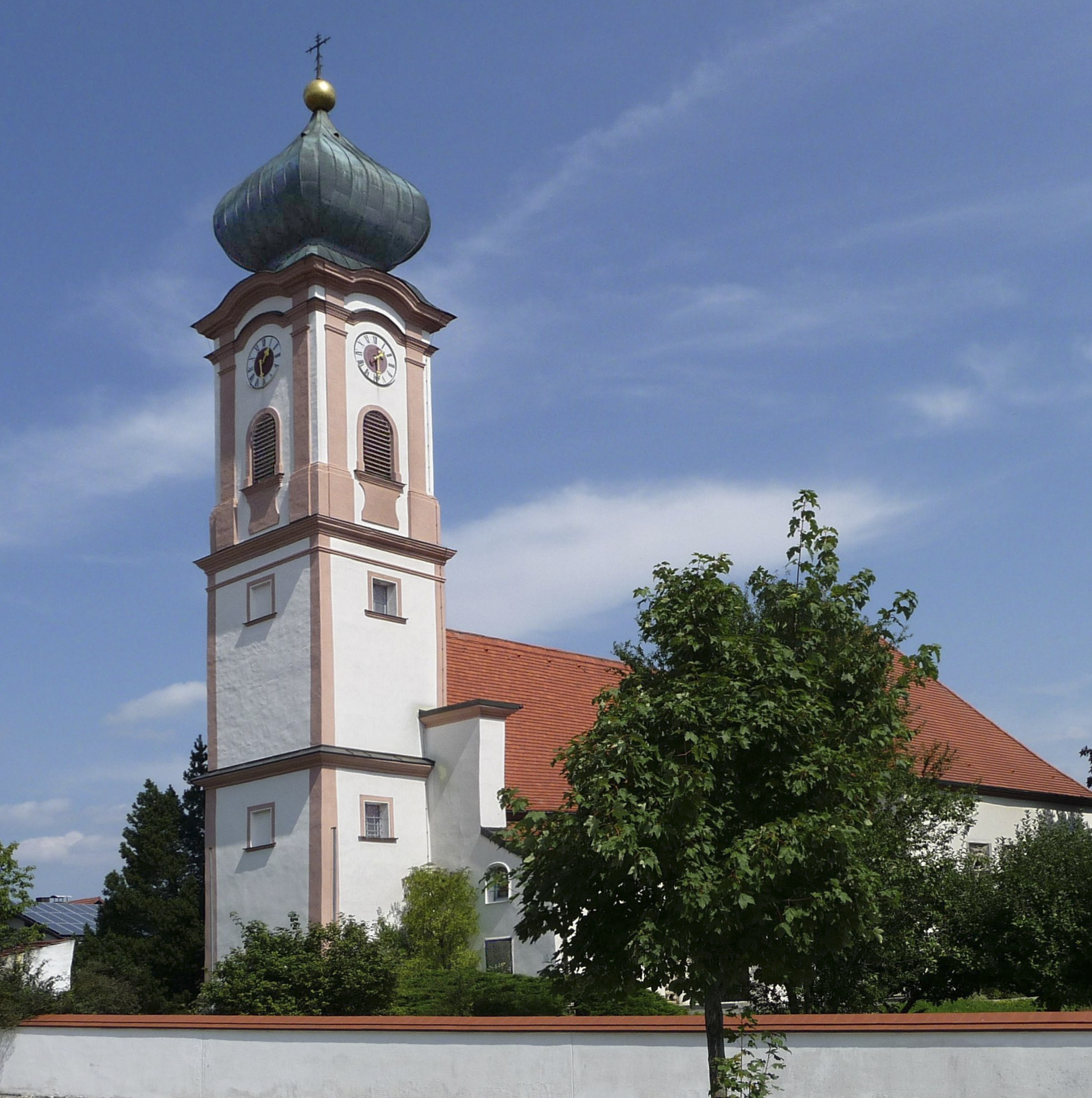
- Church in Außernzell

- Coat of arms

- Location of Außernzell within Deggendorf district
- Interactive map of Außernzell
- Location within Germany Location within Bavaria
- Coordinates: 48°43′N 13°12′E
- Country: Germany
- State: Bavaria
- Admin. region: Niederbayern
- District: Deggendorf
- Municipal assoc.: Schöllnach

Government
  - Mayor (2020–26): Michael Klampfl (CSU)

Area
  - Total: 24.13 km^{2} (9.32 sq mi)
- Elevation: 372 m (1,220 ft)

Population (2025-12-31)
  - Total: 1,528
  - Density: 63.32/km^{2} (164.0/sq mi)
- Time zone: UTC+01:00 (CET)
  - Summer (DST): UTC+02:00 (CEST)
- Postal codes: 94532
- Dialling codes: 09903
- Vehicle registration: DEG
- Website: www.aussernzell.info

Außernzell is a municipality in the district of Deggendorf in Bavaria in Germany. It is part of the municipal union of Schöllnach.

== Geography ==
The village is in the Donau-Wald region and is situated in the valley of the Kleinen Ohe river, which empties into the Danube in the Bavarian Forest.

== History ==
The first mention of the village was as "Cella antisna" in the year 841, when Abbot Gotzbold of Niederaltaich Abbey declared that the village would pass to the Abbey after his death. The village had been granted to him by the king Louis the German the year before. In 1004, Holy Roman Emperor Henry II affirmed the Abbey's possession of Cella.

In 1149 Pope Eugene III acknowledged the Abbey's possession of a parish church. It was located on an estate that would become the center of the township. The plague struck after the conclusion of the Thirty Years' War (1618–1648). The first school master was registered in the year 1716. During the War of the Austrian Succession (1740–1745), in June 1742, the enemy plundered the church and the inn. On the 13th of December 1742 Croatian troops plundered the village again.

Außernzell belonged to Bursar Straubing and to the district court of Hengersberg of the Elector Princes of Bavaria. The secularization of Bavaria brought the first parish school in the year 1803. The current parish was founded in 1818. The parish church of renovated in 1972 and its two aisles were widened. During the municipal reforms of 1978 Außernzell was combined with Markt Schöllnach to form the Municipal Union of Schöllnach.

=== Population ===
In 2000 the population of the community was 1,435.

== Attractions ==
The cityscape is dominated by the Roman Catholic parish Church of the Assumption as well as the associated Saint Leonard church. The nave of the Church of the Assumption was constructed in 1550. A new transept was added in 1972. The tabernacle is late Gothic, and the chancel is Baroque. Außernzell is also the site of a pilgrimage of Saint Leonard. The new-Gothic Saint Leonard's Church was built in 1884 on the site of an older pilgrims' chapel.

== People ==
- Michael Kurz (1876–1957), architect, was born here
- Josef Fottner (1909–1983), painter, lived here from 1975 to 1982.
