= John Evangelist Stadler =

Bavarian hagiographer

John Evangelist Stadler (24 December 1804 in Parkstetten, in the Diocese of Regensburg – 30 December 1868 in Augsburg) was a Bavarian hagiographer.

== Biography ==
After completing the humanities in the Gymnasium of Straubing in 1821, Stadler entered the Ludwig-Maximilians-Universität in Landshut, where, in addition to the philosophical and theological studies prescribed for candidates to the priesthood, he devoted much of his time to the study of Middle Eastern and modern languages. The year preceding his ordination to the priesthood he spent at the diocesan seminary of Ratisbon, where under the direction of Georg Michael Wittman, the future auxiliary Bishop of Ratisbon, he prepared himself for the priesthood. After being ordained priest by Bishop Johann Michael Sailer at Ratisbon 22 June 1827, he was occupied a few months in parochial work at the little village of Otzing in lower Bavaria, whereupon he continued his theological studies at the Ducal Georgianum in Munich in November 1828, and obtained the doctorate in Theology in 1829.

In 1830, he was "co-operator" at the Hospital of the Holy Ghost in Munich, in 1831 Privatdozent for Old Testament exegesis at the Ludwig-Maximilians-Universität München, and in 1832 he succeeded Pruggmeyr as subregens of the Georgianum. In addition, he was in 1833 appointed as professor-extraordinary and in 1837 professor-ordinary of exegesis at the university. In 1838, he became canon and in 1858 dean at Augsburg Cathedral. Stadler was well versed in all the branches of theology, but he was especially fond of linguistic studies. Besides having a mastery of German, French, Italian, and English among the modern languages, he knew Latin, Greek, Hebrew, Syriac, Arabian, Persian, Sanskrit, and in his later years he studied also Spanish and Polish.

== Works ==
Stadler was best known as the author of Vollständiges Heiligen-Lexikon oder Lebensgeschichten aller Heiligen, Seligen u.a. aller Orte und aller Jahrhunderte, deren Andenken in der kath. Kirche gefeiert oder sonst geehrt wird (Augsburg, 1858–82), an alphabetical collection of lives of Catholic saints from all over the world and from many different eras. The Acta Sanctorum of the Bollandists, as far as they were finished, that is, to the end of October, were condensed into short sketches, but many new lives were introduced and newly discovered data were added to the lives contained in the Acta. In the preparation of the first volume Stadler was assisted by Franz Joseph Heim, while the second and the third volume contain contributions from several priests of the Diocese of Augsburg. Stadler died before the third volume was finished, leaving the writing of the last two volumes to Johann Nepomuk Ginal, pastor of Zusmarshausen.

Stadler's other works include:

- a Hebrew-Latin lexicon (1831)
- De identitate Sapientiae Veteris Testamenti et Verbi Novi Testamenti, his doctoral thesis (1829)
- Dissertatio super Joannem VIII, 25 (Munich, 1832)

== Sources ==
- This article cites:
  - HORMANN in STADLER's Heiligen-Lexikon, III, 6-10;
  - SCHMID, Geschichte des Georgianums (Munich, 1894), 306, 309;
  - PRANTL, Geschichte der Ludwig-Maximilians-Universität, II (Munich, 1872), 525.
