= Künzing =

- Municipality
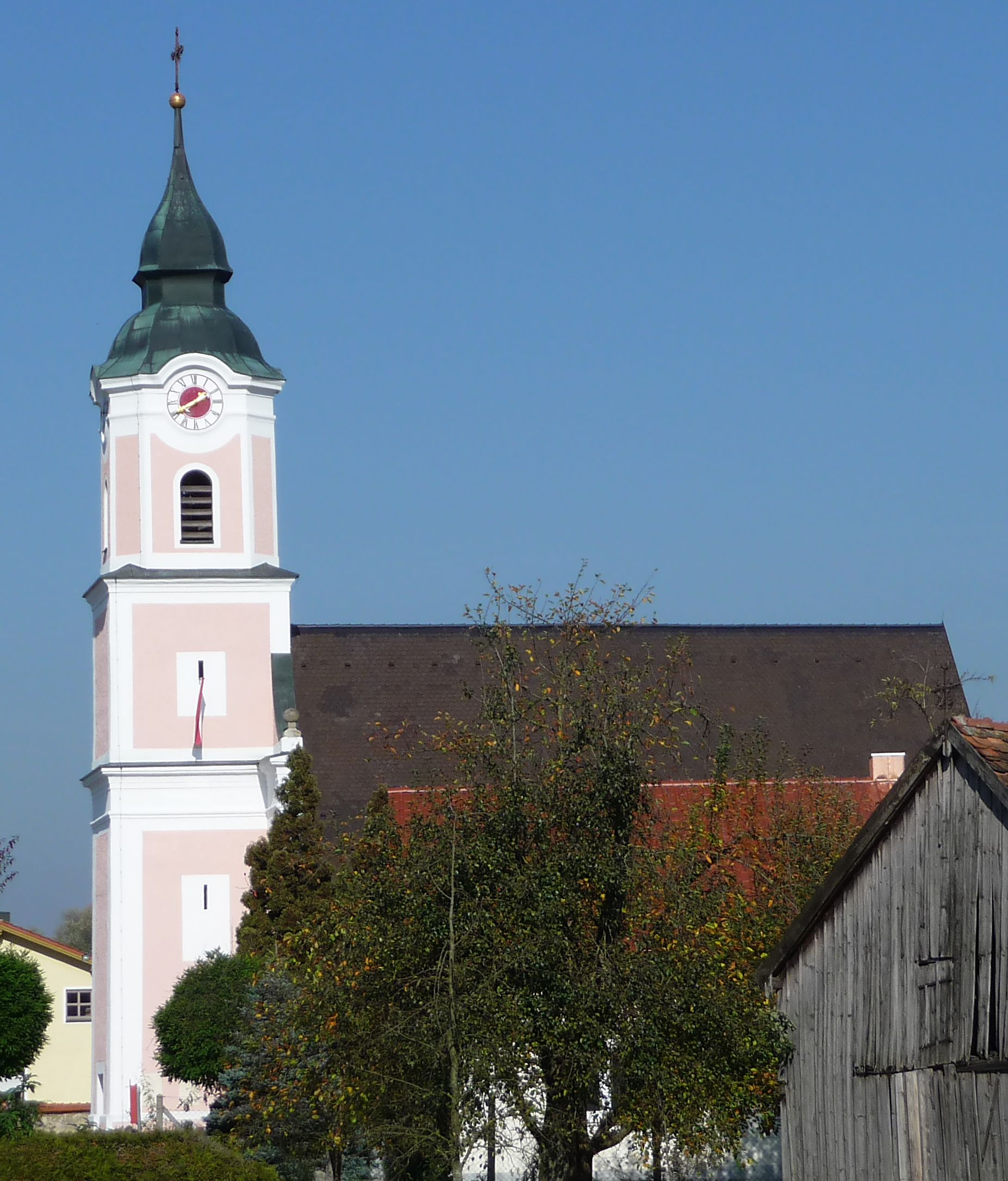
- Church of Saint Lawrence

- Coat of arms

- Location of Künzing within Deggendorf district
- Interactive map of Künzing
- Location within Germany Location within Bavaria
- Coordinates: 48°40′11″N 13°04′49″E
- Country: Germany
- State: Bavaria
- Admin. region: Niederbayern
- District: Deggendorf

Government
  - Mayor (2024–30): Siegfried Lobmeier (CSU)

Area
  - Total: 40.36 km^{2} (15.58 sq mi)
- Elevation: 310 m (1,020 ft)

Population (2025-12-31)
  - Total: 3,271
  - Density: 81.05/km^{2} (209.9/sq mi)
- Time zone: UTC+01:00 (CET)
  - Summer (DST): UTC+02:00 (CEST)
- Postal codes: 94550
- Dialling codes: 08549
- Vehicle registration: DEG
- Website: www.kuenzing.de

Künzing (pronounced [ˈkʏntsɪŋ]) is a municipality in the district of Deggendorf, Bavaria, Germany.
