= Oberpöring (Verwaltungsgemeinschaft) =

- Verwaltungsgemeinschaft
- Location of Oberpöring within Deggendorf district
- Interactive map of Oberpöring
- Location within Germany Location within Bavaria
- Coordinates: 48°42′N 12°50′E
- Country: Germany
- State: Bavaria
- Admin. region: Lower Bavaria
- District: Deggendorf
- Seat: Oberpöring
- Subdivisions: 3 municipalities

Area
  - Total: 68.58 km^{2} (26.48 sq mi)

Population (2025-12-31)
  - Total: 4,475
  - Density: 65.25/km^{2} (169.0/sq mi)
- Time zone: UTC+01:00 (CET)
  - Summer (DST): UTC+02:00 (CEST)
- Website: www.vg-oberpoering.de

Oberpöring is a Verwaltungsgemeinschaft (municipal association) in the district of Deggendorf in Bavaria, Germany. Its seat is in Oberpöring. It consists of the following municipalities:

1. Oberpöring
2. Otzing
3. Wallerfing
