= Buchhofen =

- Municipality
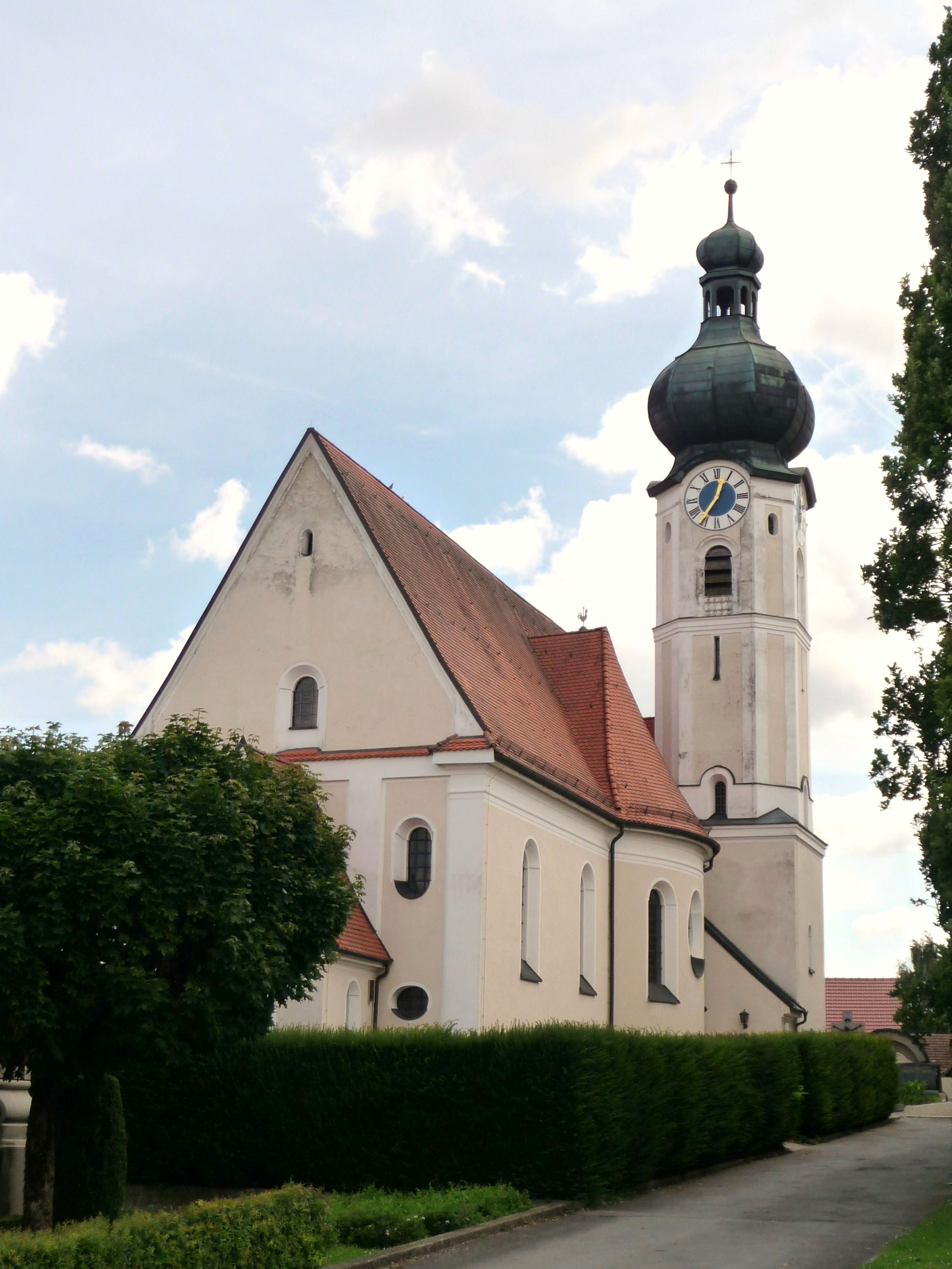
- Saint Lawrence parish church

- Coat of arms

- Location of Buchhofen within Deggendorf district
- Interactive map of Buchhofen
- Location within Germany Location within Bavaria
- Coordinates: 48°42′N 12°55′E
- Country: Germany
- State: Bavaria
- Admin. region: Niederbayern
- District: Deggendorf
- Municipal assoc.: Moos

Government
  - Mayor (2020–26): Josef Friedberger

Area
  - Total: 15.71 km^{2} (6.07 sq mi)
- Elevation: 331 m (1,086 ft)

Population (2025-12-31)
  - Total: 995
  - Density: 63.3/km^{2} (164/sq mi)
- Time zone: UTC+01:00 (CET)
  - Summer (DST): UTC+02:00 (CEST)
- Postal codes: 94533
- Dialling codes: 09936
- Vehicle registration: DEG
- Website: www.buchhofen.de

Buchhofen is a municipality in the district of Deggendorf in Bavaria in Germany.
