= RAF Ridgewell =

Former RAF station in Essex, England

RAF Ridgewell USAAF Station 167
- Near Halstead, Essex in England
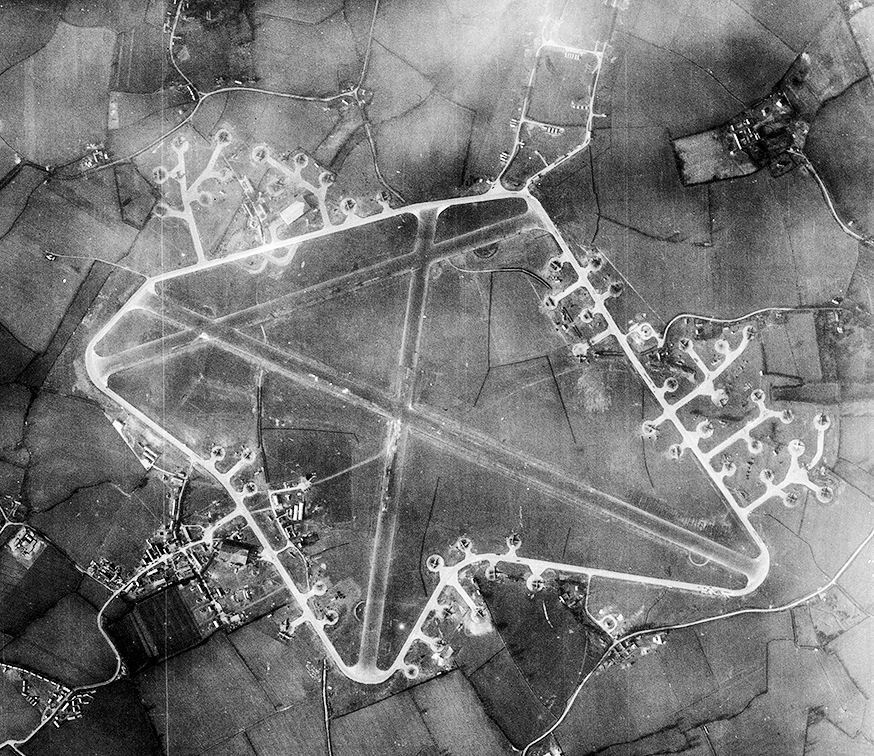
- Aerial photograph of RAF Ridgewell, the bomb dump is to the right of the airfield as at 29 February 1944. Many B-17 Flying Fortresses of the 381st Bombardment Group are visible in the photo, parked on hardstands around the perimeter track.

Site information
- Type: Royal Air Force station
- Code: RD
- Owner: Air Ministry
- Operator: Royal Air Force; United States Army Air Forces
- Controlled by: RAF Bomber Command; Eighth Air Force

Location
- Shown within Essex RAF Ridgewell (the United Kingdom)
- Coordinates: 52.04°N 0.54°E

Site history
- Built: 1942
- In use: 1942-1957
- Battles/wars: European Theatre of World War II; Air Offensive, Europe July 1942 - May 1945

Airfield information
Runways
Direction	Length and surface
00/00
00/00
00/00

Royal Air Force Ridgewell or more simply RAF Ridgewell is a former Royal Air Force station located at Ridgewell, 7.5 miles (12.1 km) north west of Halstead, Essex, England.

During the Second World War, the airfield was used by the Royal Air Force and the United States Army Air Forces Eighth Air Force.

== History ==
RAF Ridgewell was an early example of stations completed to Class A heavy bomber airfield design for the RAF, and had three intersecting runways of 6,500 ft each in length, thirty-six hardstands, two T-2 hangars and accommodation for 2,900 men in temporary buildings.

=== RAF Bomber Command use ===
The airfield was opened in December 1942 and was first used by No. 90 Squadron RAF of RAF Bomber Command, equipped with Short Stirling Bombers until May 1943, the station being at that time a satellite of RAF Stradishall.

=== USAAF use ===
RAF Ridgewell was the only long-term heavy bomber airfield of the Eighth Air Force in Essex. For United States Army Air Forces (USAAF) use, the number of hardstandings was increased to the fifty required by a US bomb group. The station was part of the 1st Combat Wing establishment of the 1st Division and was the furthest east of its thirteen heavy bomber stations. It was assigned USAAF designation Station 167, station code "RD".

==== 381st Bombardment Group ====
From 30 June 1943 the airfield was used by the USAAF 381st Bombardment Group (Heavy), arriving from Pueblo AAB, Colorado. Its tail code was Triangle-L. The 381st Bomb Group consisted of the following operational squadrons and fuselage codes:

- 532nd Bombardment Squadron (VE)
- 533nd Bombardment Squadron (VP)
- 534th Bombardment Squadron (GD)
- 535th Bombardment Squadron (MS)

After V-E Day, the 381st Bomb Group returned to Sioux Falls AAF, South Dakota in July 1945 and was inactivated on 28 August.

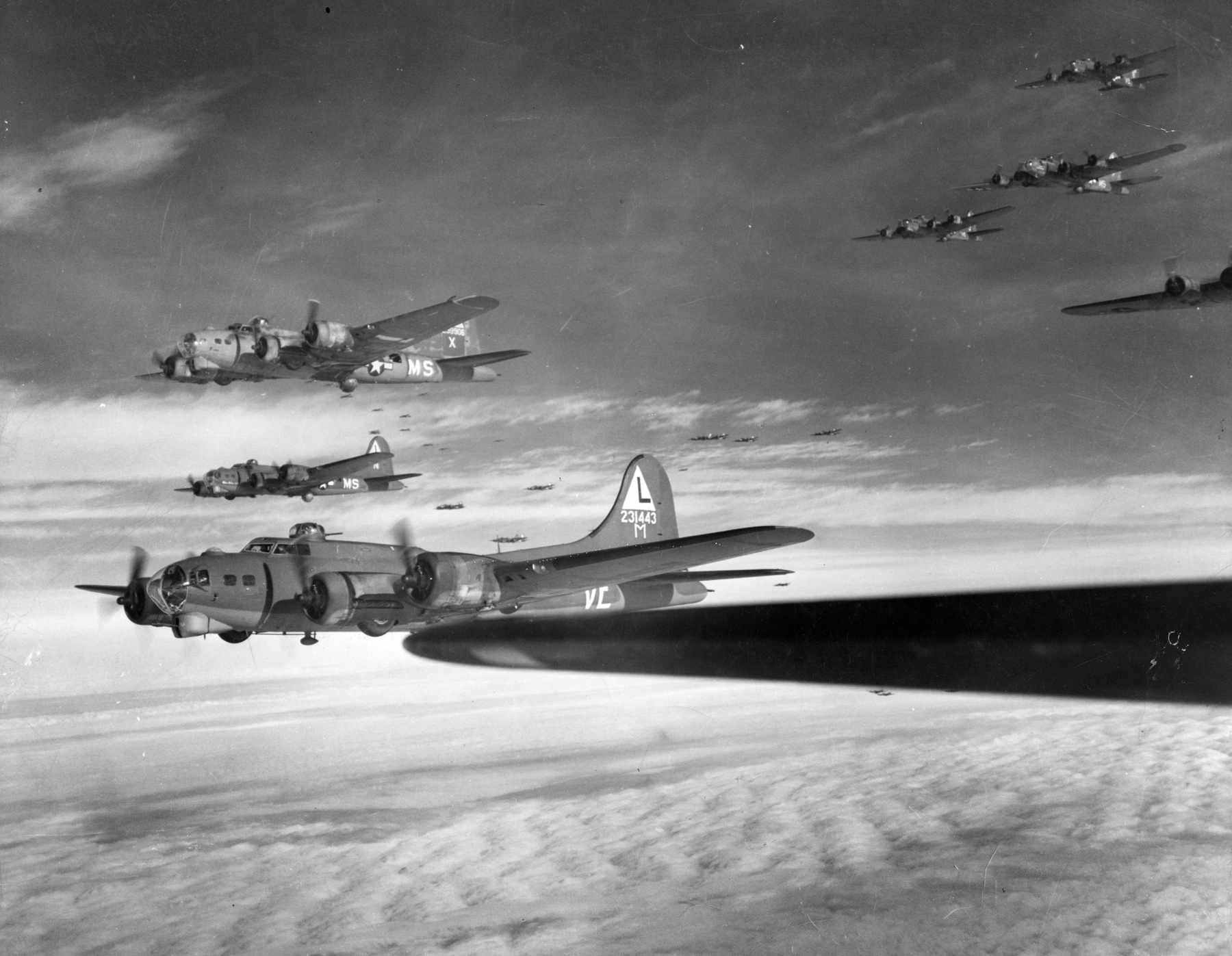
B-17s of the 381st Bomb Group, Ridgewell Airfield England, en route to targets over Nazi-occupied territory. The aircraft in the foreground is Boeing B-17G-70-BO Flying Fortress, AAF Ser. No. 42-31443, "Friday the 13th" of the 532d Bomb Squadron. This aircraft was lost on 22 February 1944 on a mission to Oschersleben, Germany.

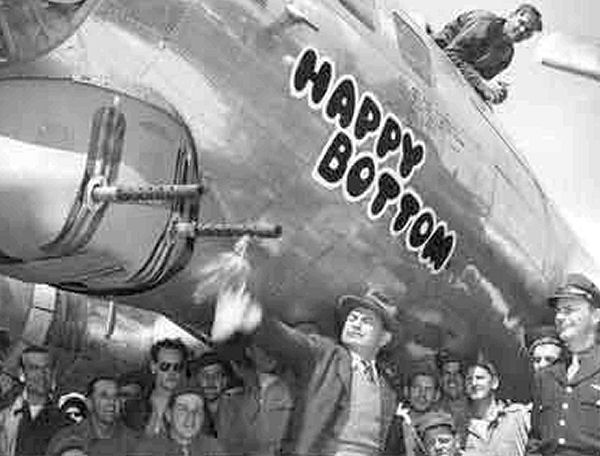
Boeing B-17G-55-BO Flying Fortress, AAF Ser. No. 42-102664, "Happy Bottom" of the 532d Bomb Squadron being christened by Edward G. Robinson, 5 July 1944. Unfortunately, this aircraft ditched in the English Channel on 16 July 1944

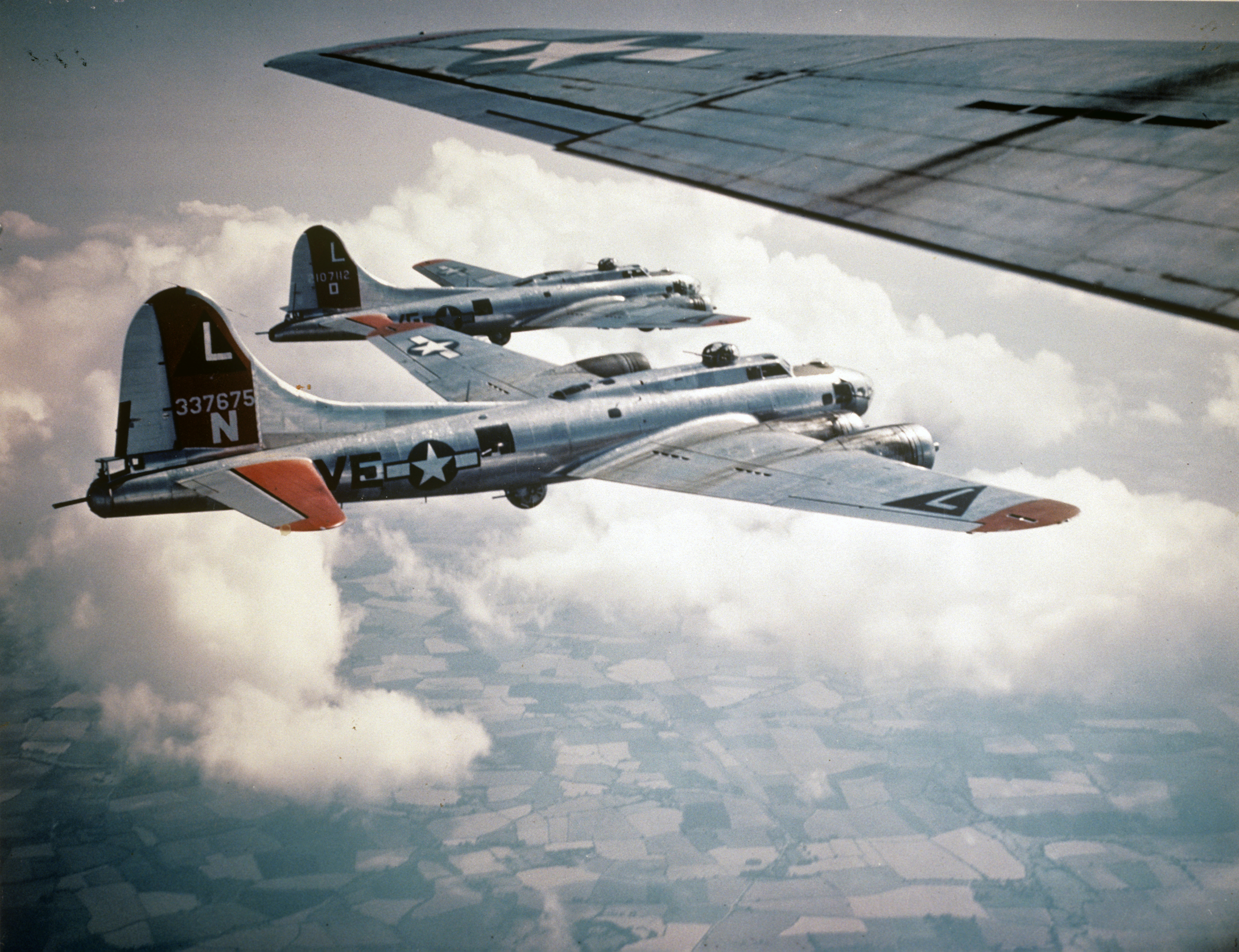
Boeing B-17G-70-BO Flying Fortress, AAF Ser. No. 43-37675, of the 532d Bomb Squadron en route to targets over Nazi-occupied territory. Named "Patches", "Flak Magnet" and "Trudie's Terror" by various aircrews, This aircraft survived the war and was retired to Kingman AAF, Arizona on 17 December 1945.

=== Air Ministry use ===
After the war, RAF Ridgewell was used for bomb storage from 15 July 1945 to 31 March 1957. It was then disposed of and sold. The United States Air Force retained the old aircraft hangars which were used by units from nearby RAF Wethersfield and RAF Alconbury for storage until both airfields were closed in the early 1990s.

== Current use ==
With the end of military control, the majority of the airfield was returned to agriculture, with the buildings and control tower being demolished. The concrete runways and hardstands were removed for hardcore, although much of the perimeter track was reused for country roads, albeit at a reduced width.

Recently part of the airfield has been purchased by the Essex gliding club and is their home location for gliding throughout the summer months.

== Memorials ==
There are several memorials to the men of RAF Ridgewell. One is dedicated to the men of RAF 90 Squadron, while a second is dedicated to the USAAF 381st Bombardment Group. Both are located on the site of the USAAF airfield hospital, where a small museum is also located. A further memorial commemorates those who lost their lives in a bomb loading accident on 23 June 1943. Constructed in October 2014, the memorial is located close to the site of the explosion next to RAF Ridgewell's former perimeter track at Ovington.

== See also ==
- List of former Royal Air Force stations
