= Lalling (Verwaltungsgemeinschaft) =

- Verwaltungsgemeinschaft
- Location of Lalling within Deggendorf district
- Interactive map of Lalling
- Location within Germany Location within Bavaria
- Coordinates: 48°51′N 13°08′E
- Country: Germany
- State: Bavaria
- Admin. region: Lower Bavaria
- District: Deggendorf
- Seat: Lalling
- Subdivisions: 4 municipalities

Area
  - Total: 93.96 km^{2} (36.28 sq mi)

Population (2025-12-31)
  - Total: 5,633
  - Density: 59.95/km^{2} (155.3/sq mi)
- Time zone: UTC+01:00 (CET)
  - Summer (DST): UTC+02:00 (CEST)
- Website: www.vg-lalling.de

Lalling is a Verwaltungsgemeinschaft (municipal association) in the district of Deggendorf in Bavaria, Germany. Its seat is in Lalling. It consists of the following municipalities:

1. Grattersdorf
2. Hunding
3. Lalling
4. Schaufling
