= Moos (Verwaltungsgemeinschaft) =

- Verwaltungsgemeinschaft
- Location of Moos within Deggendorf district
- Interactive map of Moos
- Location within Germany Location within Bavaria
- Coordinates: 48°45′N 12°58′E
- Country: Germany
- State: Bavaria
- Admin. region: Lower Bavaria
- District: Deggendorf
- Seat: Moos
- Subdivisions: 2 municipalities

Area
  - Total: 47.99 km^{2} (18.53 sq mi)

Population (2025-12-31)
  - Total: 3,368
  - Density: 70.18/km^{2} (181.8/sq mi)
- Time zone: UTC+01:00 (CET)
  - Summer (DST): UTC+02:00 (CEST)
- Website: www.vg-moos.de

Moos is a Verwaltungsgemeinschaft (municipal association) in the district of Deggendorf in Bavaria, Germany. Its seat is in Moos. It consists of the following municipalities:

1. Buchhofen
2. Moos
