= Iggensbach =

- Municipality
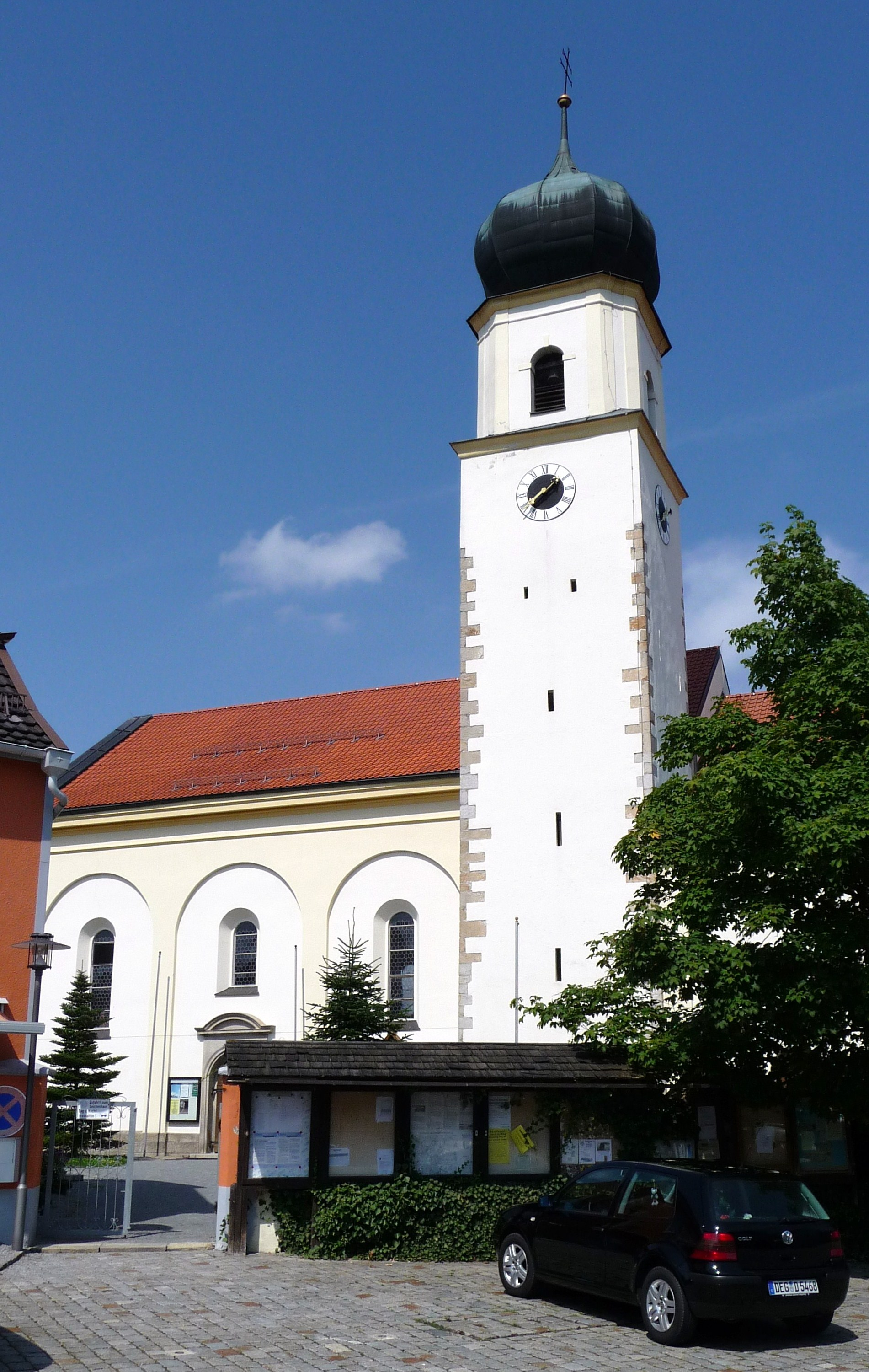
- Church of the Virgin Mary

- Coat of arms

- Location of Iggensbach within Deggendorf district
- Interactive map of Iggensbach
- Location within Germany Location within Bavaria
- Coordinates: 48°44′N 13°8′E
- Country: Germany
- State: Bavaria
- Admin. region: Lower Bavaria
- District: Deggendorf

Government
  - Mayor (2024–30): Wolfgang Schwarz (SPD)

Area
  - Total: 19.08 km^{2} (7.37 sq mi)
- Elevation: 382 m (1,253 ft)

Population (2025-12-31)
  - Total: 2,221
  - Density: 116.4/km^{2} (301.5/sq mi)
- Time zone: UTC+01:00 (CET)
  - Summer (DST): UTC+02:00 (CEST)
- Postal codes: 94547
- Dialling codes: 09903
- Vehicle registration: DEG
- Website: www.iggensbach.de

Iggensbach (German pronunciation: [ˈɪɡn̩sbax]) is a municipality in the district of Deggendorf in Bavaria in Germany.
