= Schöllnach (Verwaltungsgemeinschaft) =

- Verwaltungsgemeinschaft
- Location of Schöllnach within Deggendorf district
- Interactive map of Schöllnach
- Location within Germany Location within Bavaria
- Coordinates: 48°45′N 13°10′E
- Country: Germany
- State: Bavaria
- Admin. region: Lower Bavaria
- District: Deggendorf
- Seat: Schöllnach
- Subdivisions: 2 municipalities

Area
  - Total: 64.01 km^{2} (24.71 sq mi)

Population (2025-12-31)
  - Total: 6,281
  - Density: 98.13/km^{2} (254.1/sq mi)
- Time zone: UTC+01:00 (CET)
  - Summer (DST): UTC+02:00 (CEST)
- Website: www.schoellnach.de

Schöllnach is a Verwaltungsgemeinschaft (municipal association) in the district of Deggendorf in Bavaria, Germany. Its seat is in Schöllnach. It consists of the following municipalities:

1. Außernzell
2. Schöllnach
