= Oberpöring =

- Municipality
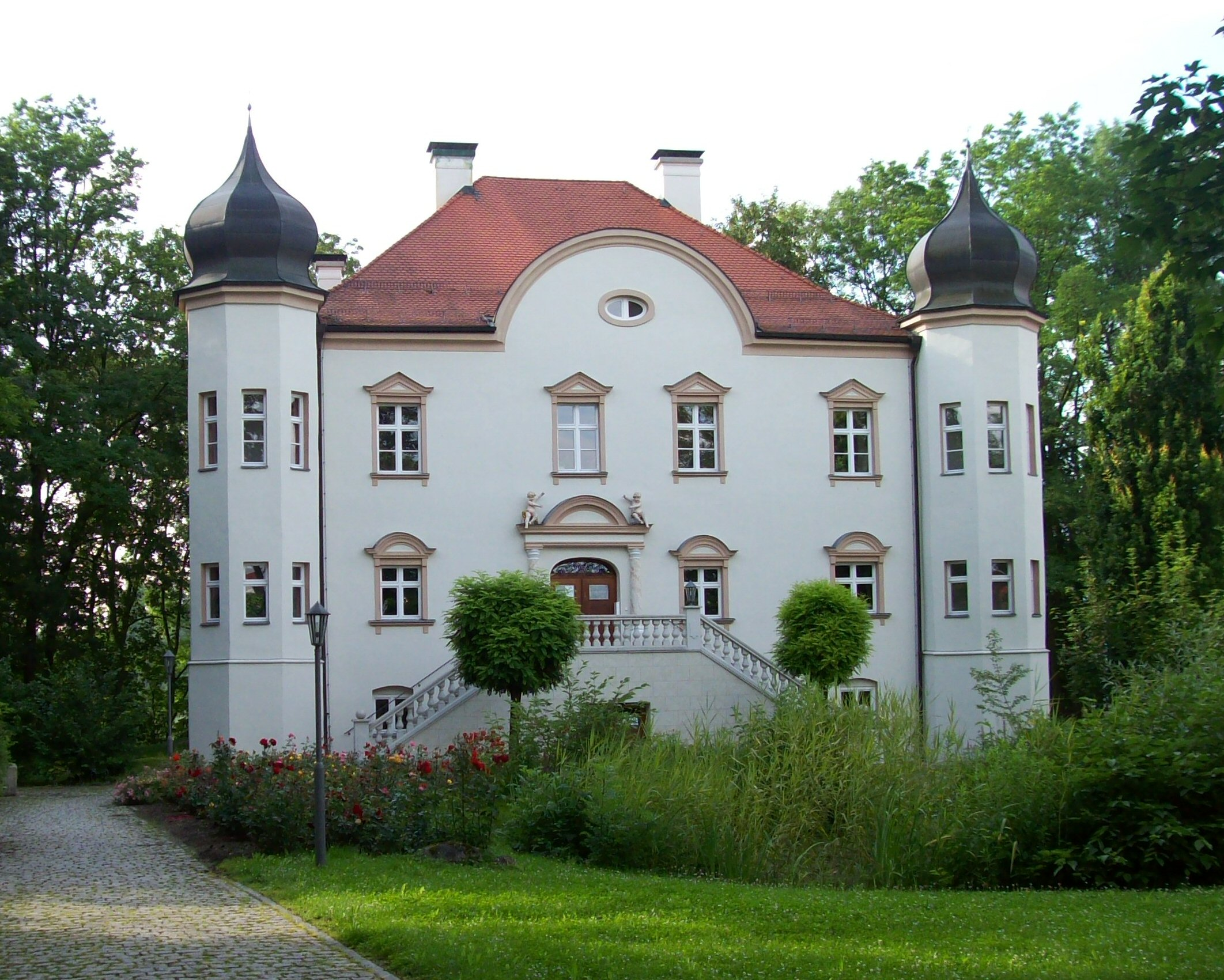
- Niederpöring Castle, seat of the town hall of Oberpöring

- Coat of arms

- Location of Oberpöring within Deggendorf district
- Interactive map of Oberpöring
- Location within Germany Location within Bavaria
- Coordinates: 48°42′N 12°50′E
- Country: Germany
- State: Bavaria
- Admin. region: Niederbayern
- District: Deggendorf
- Municipal assoc.: Oberpöring

Government
  - Mayor (2020–26): Thomas Stoiber (FW)

Area
  - Total: 17.38 km^{2} (6.71 sq mi)
- Elevation: 349 m (1,145 ft)

Population (2025-12-31)
  - Total: 1,205
  - Density: 69.33/km^{2} (179.6/sq mi)
- Time zone: UTC+01:00 (CET)
  - Summer (DST): UTC+02:00 (CEST)
- Postal codes: 94562
- Dialling codes: 09937
- Vehicle registration: DEG
- Website: www.oberpoering.de

Oberpöring is a municipality in the district of Deggendorf in Bavaria in Germany.
