= Wallerfing =

- Municipality
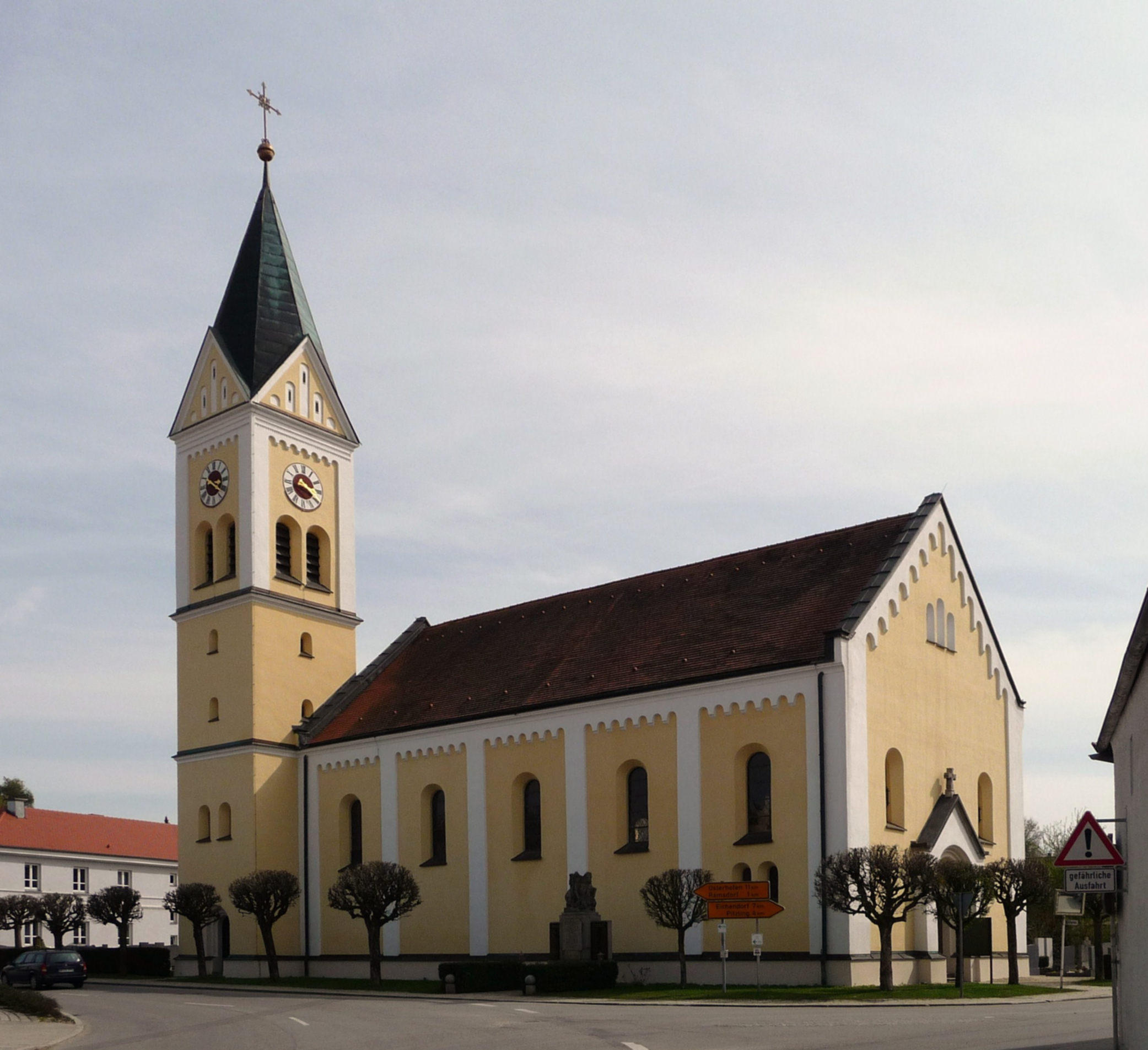
- Saint John the Baptist Church

- Coat of arms

- Location of Wallerfing within Deggendorf district
- Interactive map of Wallerfing
- Location within Germany Location within Bavaria
- Coordinates: 48°41′N 12°53′E
- Country: Germany
- State: Bavaria
- Admin. region: Niederbayern
- District: Deggendorf
- Municipal assoc.: Oberpöring
- Subdivisions: 19 Ortsteile (Gemarkungen)

Government
  - Mayor (2020–26): Johann Eigner

Area
  - Total: 20.76 km^{2} (8.02 sq mi)
- Elevation: 357 m (1,171 ft)

Population (2025-12-31)
  - Total: 1,282
  - Density: 61.75/km^{2} (159.9/sq mi)
- Time zone: UTC+01:00 (CET)
  - Summer (DST): UTC+02:00 (CEST)
- Postal codes: 94574
- Dialling codes: 09936
- Vehicle registration: DEG

Wallerfing is a municipality in the district of Deggendorf in Bavaria, Germany.
