= Moos, Bavaria =

Moos
- Municipality
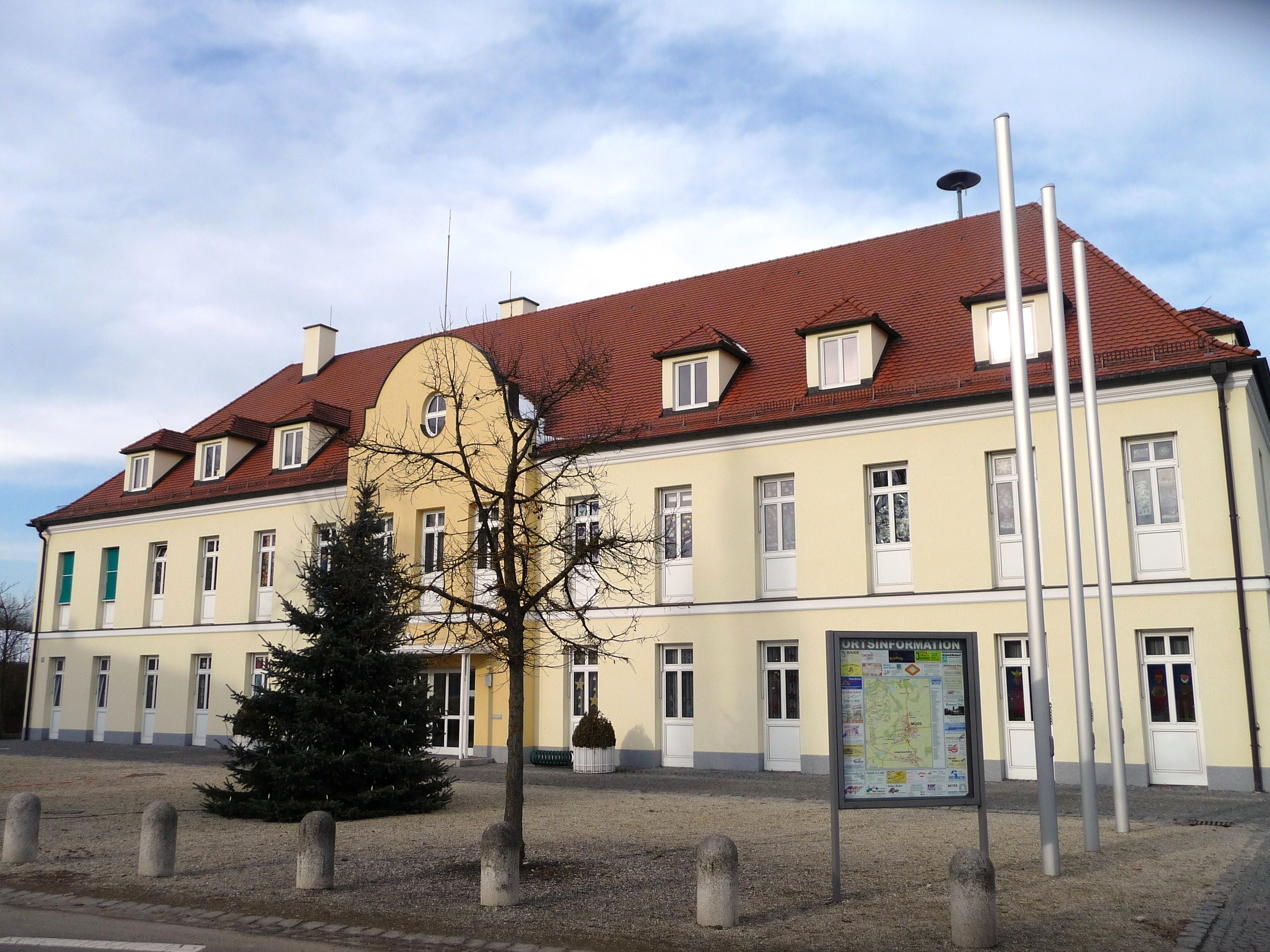
- Town hall

- Coat of arms

- Location of Moos within Deggendorf district
- Interactive map of Moos
- Location within Germany Location within Bavaria
- Coordinates: 48°45′N 12°58′E
- Country: Germany
- State: Bavaria
- Admin. region: Niederbayern
- District: Deggendorf
- Municipal assoc.: Moos

Government
  - Mayor (2020–26): Alexander Zacher

Area
  - Total: 32.23 km^{2} (12.44 sq mi)
- Elevation: 316 m (1,037 ft)

Population (2025-12-31)
  - Total: 2,373
  - Density: 73.63/km^{2} (190.7/sq mi)
- Time zone: UTC+01:00 (CET)
  - Summer (DST): UTC+02:00 (CEST)
- Postal codes: 94554
- Dialling codes: 09938
- Vehicle registration: DEG
- Website: www.gemeinde-moos.de

Moos (German pronunciation: [moːs]) is a municipality in the district of Deggendorf in Bavaria in Germany.
