= Otzing =

- Municipality
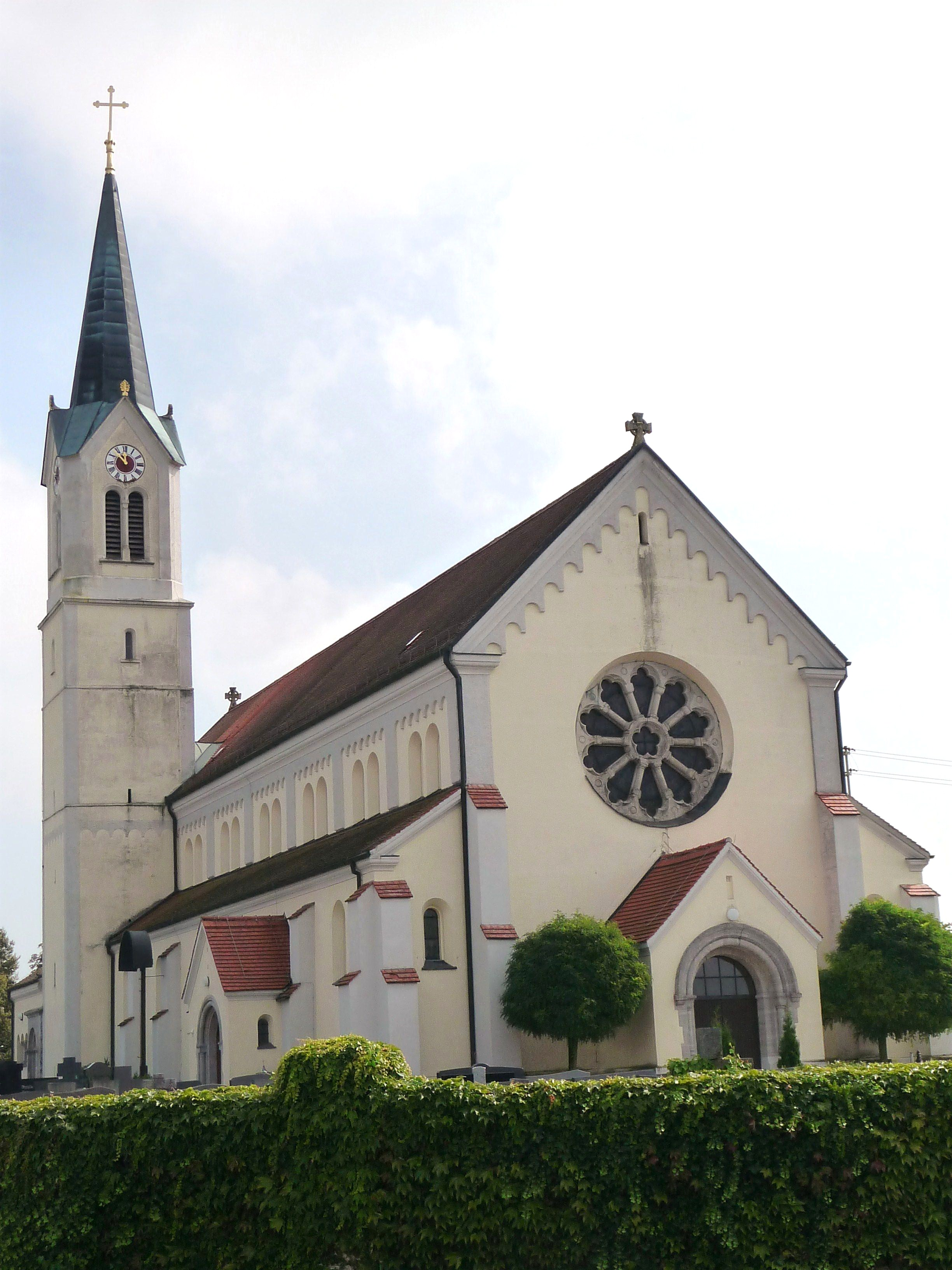
- Church of Saint Lawrence

- Coat of arms

- Location of Otzing within Deggendorf district
- Interactive map of Otzing
- Location within Germany Location within Bavaria
- Coordinates: 48°46′N 12°49′E
- Country: Germany
- State: Bavaria
- Admin. region: Niederbayern
- District: Deggendorf
- Municipal assoc.: Oberpöring
- Subdivisions: 6 Ortsteil

Government
  - Mayor (2020–26): Johannes Schmid (CSU)

Area
  - Total: 30.43 km^{2} (11.75 sq mi)
- Elevation: 330 m (1,080 ft)

Population (2025-12-31)
  - Total: 1,988
  - Density: 65.33/km^{2} (169.2/sq mi)
- Time zone: UTC+01:00 (CET)
  - Summer (DST): UTC+02:00 (CEST)
- Postal codes: 94563
- Dialling codes: 09931, 09933
- Vehicle registration: DEG
- Website: www.otzing.de

Otzing (German pronunciation: [ˈɔtsɪŋ]) is a municipality in the district of Deggendorf in Bavaria in Germany.
