= Schöllnach =

- Municipality
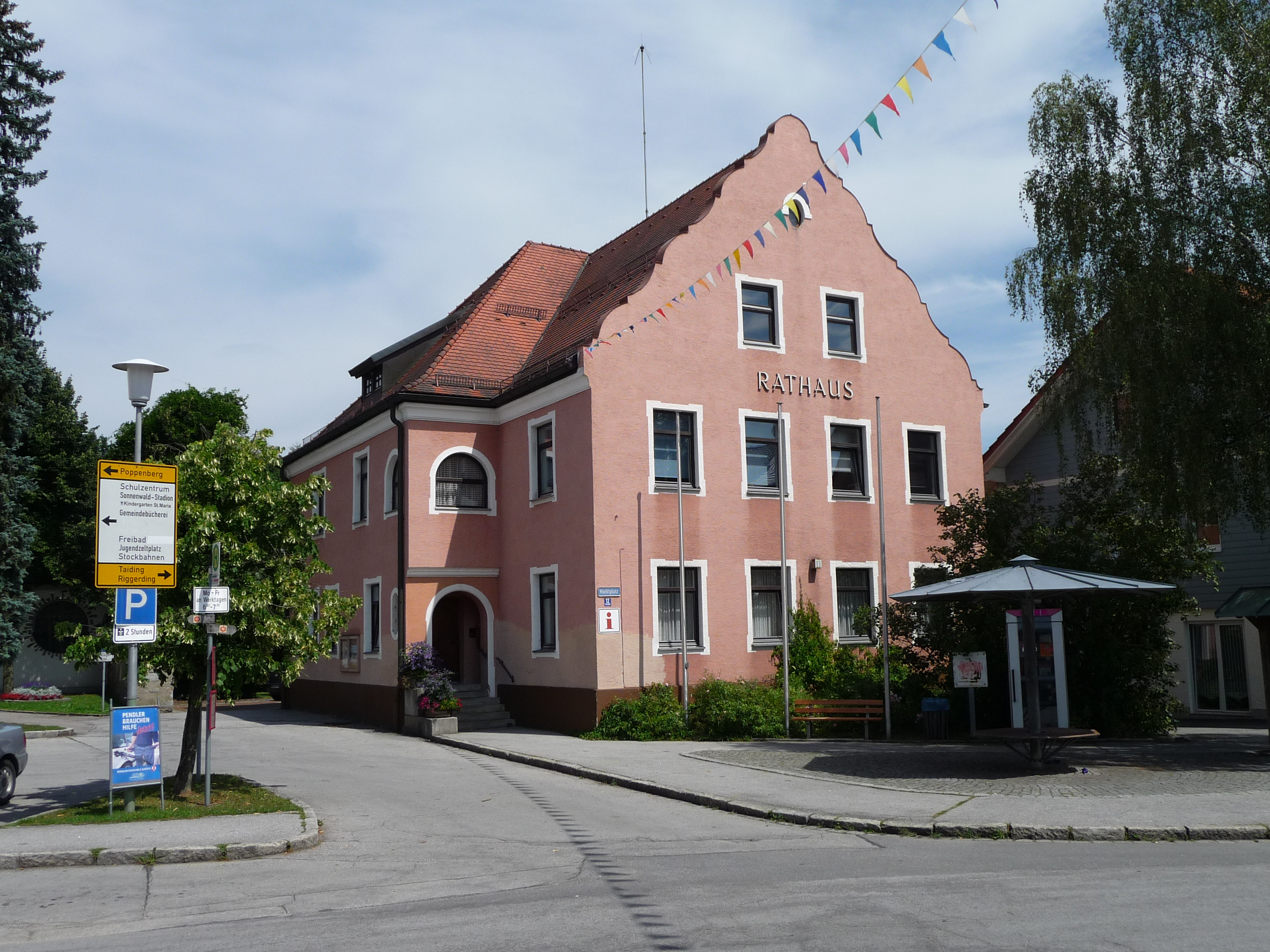
- Town hall

- Coat of arms

- Location of Schöllnach within Deggendorf district
- Interactive map of Schöllnach
- Location within Germany Location within Bavaria
- Coordinates: 48°45′N 13°10′E
- Country: Germany
- State: Bavaria
- Admin. region: Niederbayern
- District: Deggendorf
- Municipal assoc.: Schöllnach
- Subdivisions: 2 Ortsteile

Government
  - Mayor (2020–26): Alois Oswald (FW)

Area
  - Total: 39.9 km^{2} (15.4 sq mi)
- Elevation: 371 m (1,217 ft)

Population (2025-12-31)
  - Total: 4,753
  - Density: 119/km^{2} (309/sq mi)
- Time zone: UTC+01:00 (CET)
  - Summer (DST): UTC+02:00 (CEST)
- Postal codes: 94508
- Dialling codes: 09903
- Vehicle registration: DEG
- Website: www.schoellnach.de

Schöllnach (German pronunciation: [ˈʃœlnax]) is a municipality in the district of Deggendorf in Bavaria in Germany.
