= Hunding =

- Municipality
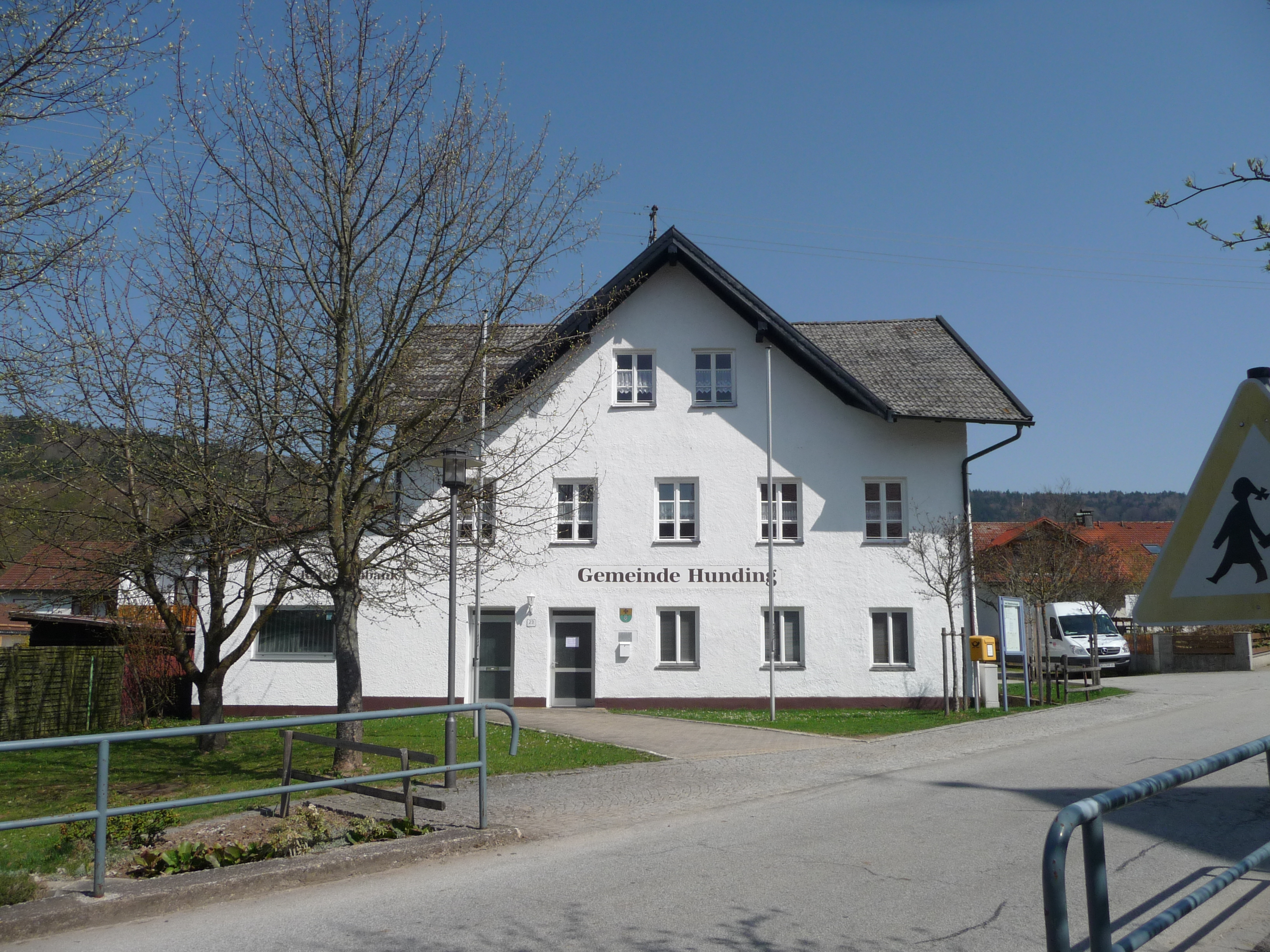
- Town hall

- Coat of arms

- Location of Hunding within Deggendorf district
- Interactive map of Hunding
- Location within Germany Location within Bavaria
- Coordinates: 48°51′N 13°11′E
- Country: Germany
- State: Bavaria
- Admin. region: Niederbayern
- District: Deggendorf
- Municipal assoc.: Lalling

Government
  - Mayor (2020–26): Thomas Straßer

Area
  - Total: 14.67 km^{2} (5.66 sq mi)
- Elevation: 468 m (1,535 ft)

Population (2025-12-31)
  - Total: 1,165
  - Density: 79.41/km^{2} (205.7/sq mi)
- Time zone: UTC+01:00 (CET)
  - Summer (DST): UTC+02:00 (CEST)
- Postal codes: 94551
- Dialling codes: 09904
- Vehicle registration: DEG
- Website: www.hunding.de

Hunding (German pronunciation: [ˈhʊndɪŋ]) is a municipality in the district of Deggendorf in Bavaria in Germany.
