= Schaufling =

- Municipality
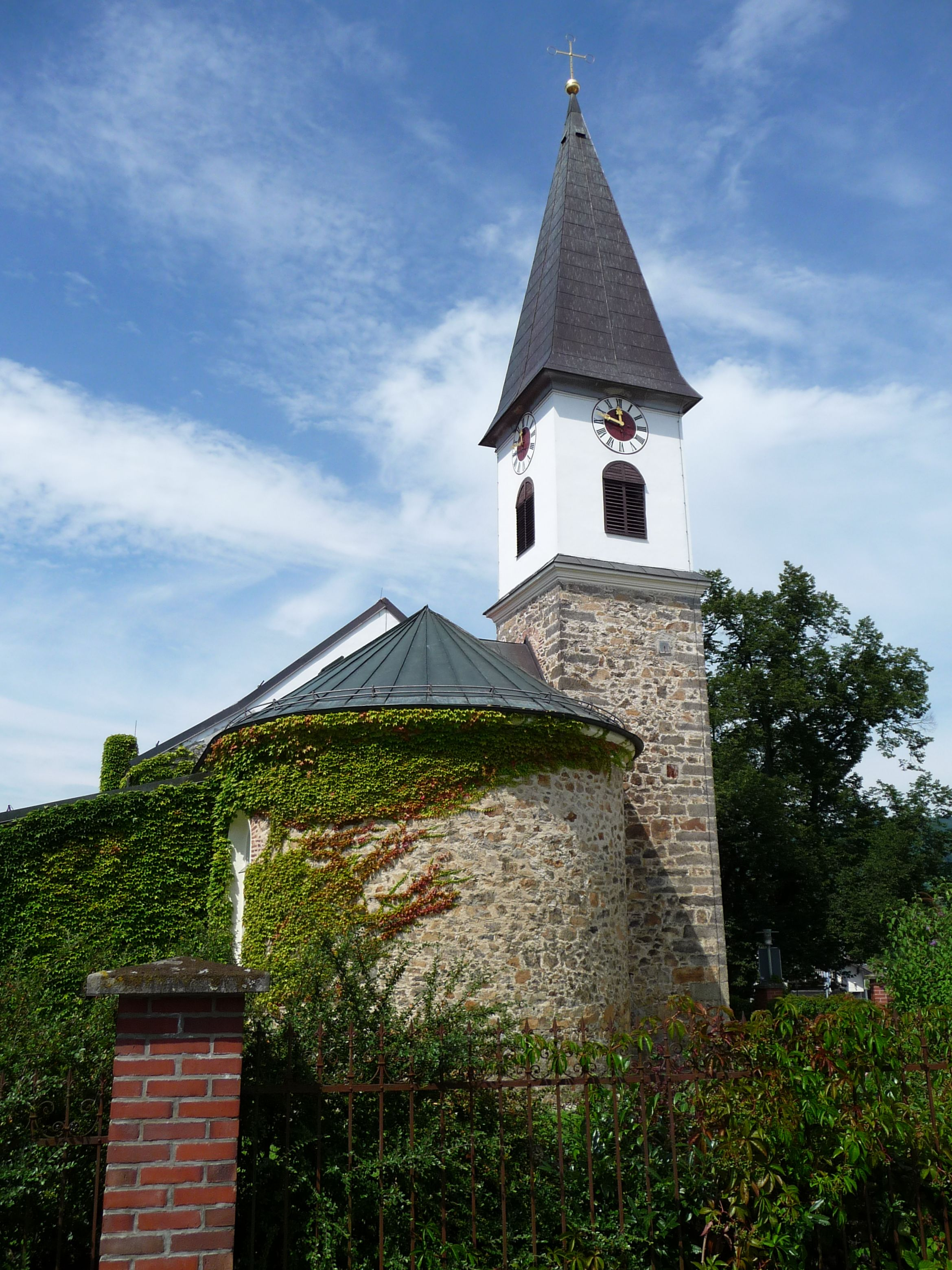
- Church of the Fourteen Holy Helpers

- Coat of arms

- Location of Schaufling within Deggendorf district
- Interactive map of Schaufling
- Location within Germany Location within Bavaria
- Coordinates: 48°51′N 13°4′E
- Country: Germany
- State: Bavaria
- Admin. region: Niederbayern
- District: Deggendorf
- Municipal assoc.: Lalling
- Subdivisions: 26 Ortsteile

Government
  - Mayor (2020–26): Robert Bauer (SPD)

Area
  - Total: 25.39 km^{2} (9.80 sq mi)
- Elevation: 443 m (1,453 ft)

Population (2025-12-31)
  - Total: 1,495
  - Density: 58.88/km^{2} (152.5/sq mi)
- Time zone: UTC+01:00 (CET)
  - Summer (DST): UTC+02:00 (CEST)
- Postal codes: 94571
- Dialling codes: 09904
- Vehicle registration: DEG
- Website: www.schaufling.de

Schaufling (German pronunciation: [ˈʃaʊflɪŋ]) is a municipality in the district of Deggendorf in Bavaria in Germany.
