= Lalling =

- Municipality
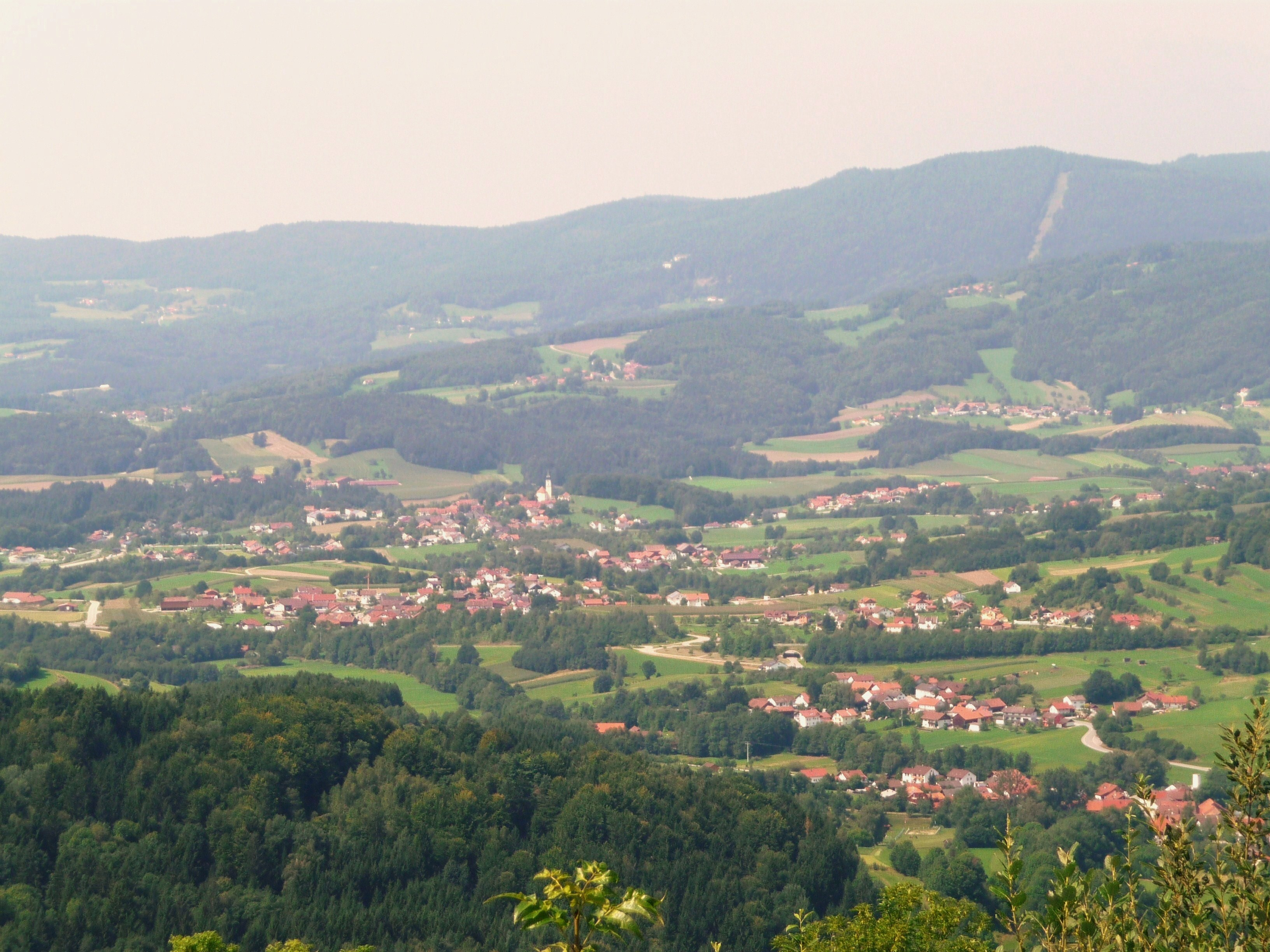
- Lalling

- Coat of arms

- Location of Lalling within Deggendorf district
- Interactive map of Lalling
- Location within Germany Location within Bavaria
- Coordinates: 48°51′N 13°8′E
- Country: Germany
- State: Bavaria
- Admin. region: Niederbayern
- District: Deggendorf
- Municipal assoc.: Lalling

Government
  - Mayor (2020–26): Michael Reitberger (CSU)

Area
  - Total: 27.92 km^{2} (10.78 sq mi)
- Elevation: 446 m (1,463 ft)

Population (2025-12-31)
  - Total: 1,630
  - Density: 58.4/km^{2} (151/sq mi)
- Time zone: UTC+01:00 (CET)
  - Summer (DST): UTC+02:00 (CEST)
- Postal codes: 94551
- Dialling codes: 09904
- Vehicle registration: DEG
- Website: www.lalling.de

Lalling (German pronunciation: [ˈlalɪŋ]) is a municipality in the Lower Bavarian district of Deggendorf in Germany. It is a nationally recognized resort town.

== Geography ==
Lalling is located along the Danube in the south of the Bavarian Forest, specifically in what is called the Lallinger angle.

== History ==
Lalling and its community were first mentioned in a letter of protection from Pope Eugene III in 1148. From the early 13th Century until 1803 the Niederaltaich Abbey was its largest landlord. Lalling was considered part of the lands held by the Electorate of Bavaria. In the course of administrative reform in Bavaria, it became municipality in 1818.

== Attractions ==
- the Tithe barn at Niederalteich Abbey
