= Auerbach, Lower Bavaria =

Auerbach
- Municipality
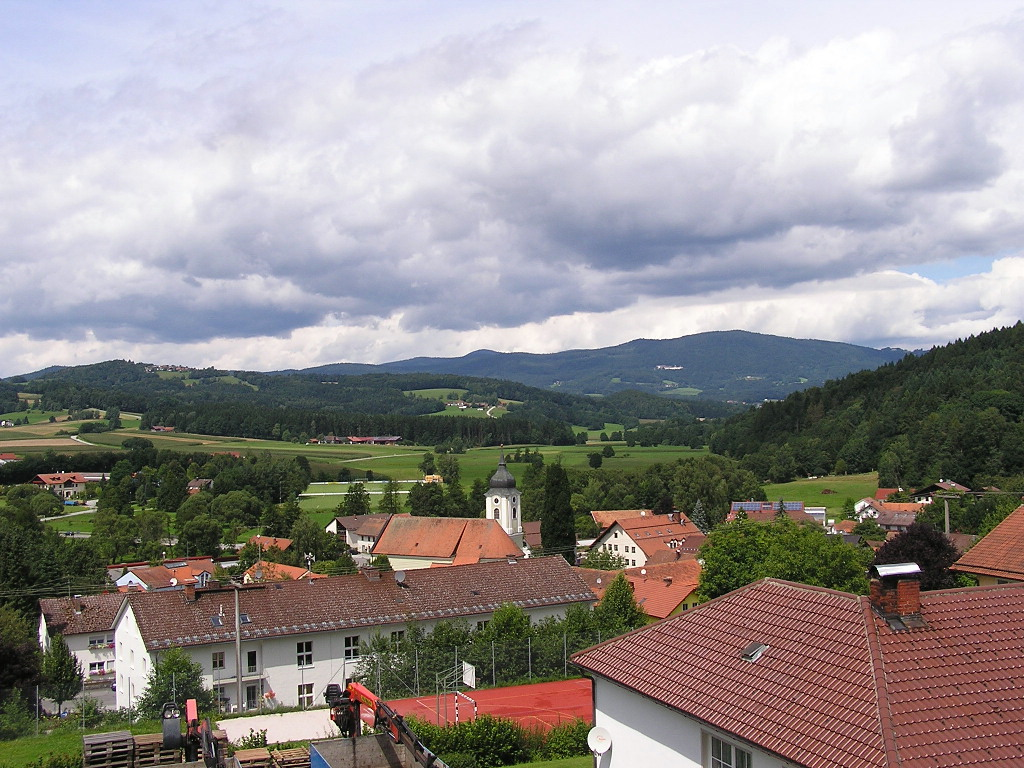
- Auerbach

- Coat of arms

- Location of Auerbach within Deggendorf district
- Interactive map of Auerbach
- Location within Germany Location within Bavaria
- Coordinates: 48°48′N 13°6′E
- Country: Germany
- State: Bavaria
- Admin. region: Niederbayern
- District: Deggendorf

Government
  - Mayor (2020–26): Gerhard Weber

Area
  - Total: 24.06 km^{2} (9.29 sq mi)
- Elevation: 310 m (1,020 ft)

Population (2025-12-31)
  - Total: 2,120
  - Density: 88.1/km^{2} (228/sq mi)
- Time zone: UTC+01:00 (CET)
  - Summer (DST): UTC+02:00 (CEST)
- Postal codes: 94530
- Dialling codes: 09901
- Vehicle registration: DEG
- Website: www.gemeinde-auerbach.de

Auerbach (German pronunciation: [ˈaʊ̯ɐˌbax]) is a municipality in the district of Deggendorf in Bavaria in Germany.
