= Winzer =

- Municipality
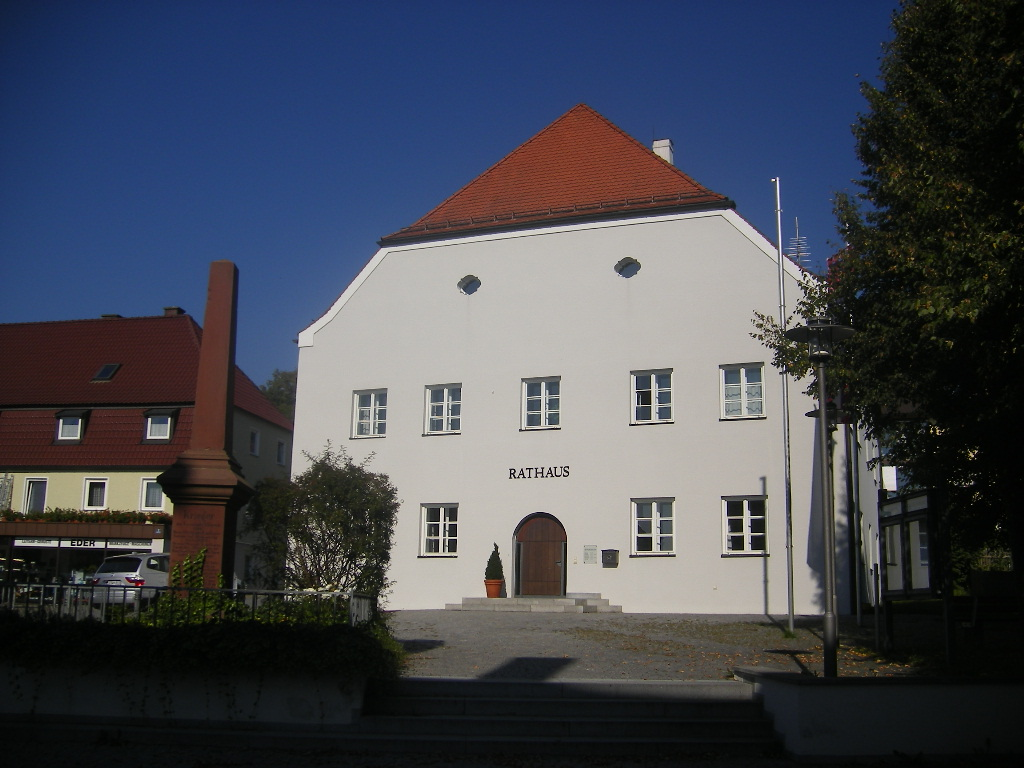
- Town hall

- Coat of arms

- Location of Winzer within Deggendorf district
- Interactive map of Winzer
- Location within Germany Location within Bavaria
- Coordinates: 48°43′N 13°4′E
- Country: Germany
- State: Bavaria
- Admin. region: Niederbayern
- District: Deggendorf
- Subdivisions: 13 Ortsteile

Government
  - Mayor (2020–26): Jürgen Roith (CSU)

Area
  - Total: 27.61 km^{2} (10.66 sq mi)
- Elevation: 311 m (1,020 ft)

Population (2025-12-31)
  - Total: 3,803
  - Density: 137.7/km^{2} (356.7/sq mi)
- Time zone: UTC+01:00 (CET)
  - Summer (DST): UTC+02:00 (CEST)
- Postal codes: 94577
- Dialling codes: 09901
- Vehicle registration: DEG
- Website: www.marktwinzer.de

Winzer (German pronunciation: [ˈvɪntsɐ]) is a municipality in the district of Deggendorf in Bavaria in Germany.
