= Offenberg =

- Municipality
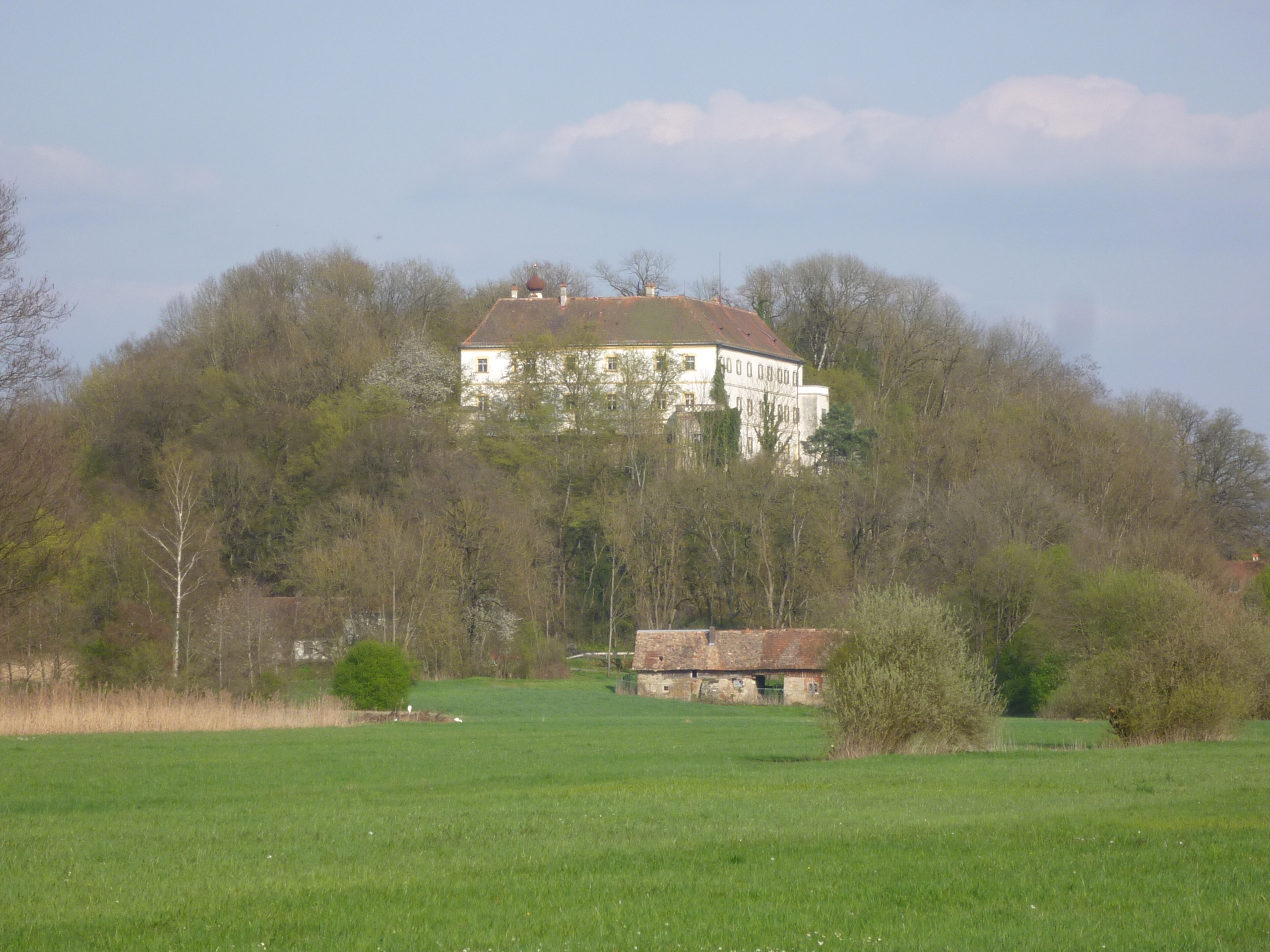
- Offenberg Castle

- Coat of arms

- Location of Offenberg within Deggendorf district
- Interactive map of Offenberg
- Location within Germany Location within Bavaria
- Coordinates: 48°52′N 12°52′E
- Country: Germany
- State: Bavaria
- Admin. region: Niederbayern
- District: Deggendorf

Government
  - Mayor (2020–26): Hans-Jürgen Fischer (CSU)

Area
  - Total: 23.76 km^{2} (9.17 sq mi)
- Elevation: 346 m (1,135 ft)

Population (2025-12-31)
  - Total: 3,371
  - Density: 141.9/km^{2} (367.5/sq mi)
- Time zone: UTC+01:00 (CET)
  - Summer (DST): UTC+02:00 (CEST)
- Postal codes: 94560
- Dialling codes: 0991, 09962 und 09906
- Vehicle registration: DEG
- Website: www.offenberg.de

Offenberg (German pronunciation: [ˈɔfn̩bɛʁk]) is a municipality in the district of Deggendorf in Bavaria in Germany.
