= Deggendorf (district) =

Coordinates: 48°50′N 13°00′E

- District
- Flag Coat of arms
- Country: Germany
- State: Bavaria
- Adm. region: Lower Bavaria
- Capital: Deggendorf

Government
  - District admin.: Bernd Sibler (CSU)

Area
  - Total: 861 km^{2} (332 sq mi)

Population (31 December 2025)
  - Total: 121,886
  - Density: 142/km^{2} (367/sq mi)
- Time zone: UTC+01:00 (CET)
  - Summer (DST): UTC+02:00 (CEST)
- Vehicle registration: DEG
- Website: landkreis-deggendorf.de

Deggendorf is a Landkreis (district) in Bavaria, Germany. It is bordered by (from the north and clockwise) the districts of Regen, Freyung-Grafenau, Passau, Rottal-Inn, Dingolfing-Landau and Straubing-Bogen.

== History ==
The district was established in 1936. Minor changes of the borders in 1972 led to the present form of the district.

== Geography ==
The Danube river runs through the district from west to east, dividing it into two unequal regions. North of the Danube the Bavarian Forest rises steeply. In the south there is relatively plain countryside. The Isar river enters the district in the south and meets the Danube close to the town of Deggendorf. The Einödriegel (1,220 m) is the highest point within the county.

== Coat of arms ==
The double eagle was the symbol of the monastery of Metten, which was the first Christian outpost in the region. The blue line stands for the river Danube, the green hills symbolise the Bavarian Forest.

== Towns and municipalities ==
Clickable map of towns and municipalities in the district

Towns
1. Deggendorf
2. Osterhofen
3. Plattling
Märkte
1. Hengersberg
2. Metten
3. Winzer
Municipalities
1. Aholming
2. Auerbach
3. Bernried
4. Grafling
5. Iggensbach
6. Künzing
7. Niederalteich
8. Offenberg
9. Stephansposching

Verwaltungsgemeinschaften
1. Lalling; 1. Grattersdorf; 2. Hunding; 3. Lalling^{1}; 4. Schaufling	2. Moos; 1. Buchhofen; 2. Moos^{1}	3. Oberpöring; 1. Oberpöring^{1}; 2. Otzing; 3. Wallerfing	4. Schöllnach; 1. Außernzell; 2. Schöllnach^{1,2}
^{1}seat of the Verwaltungsgemeinschaft; ^{2}Markt
