= Hengersberg =

- Municipality
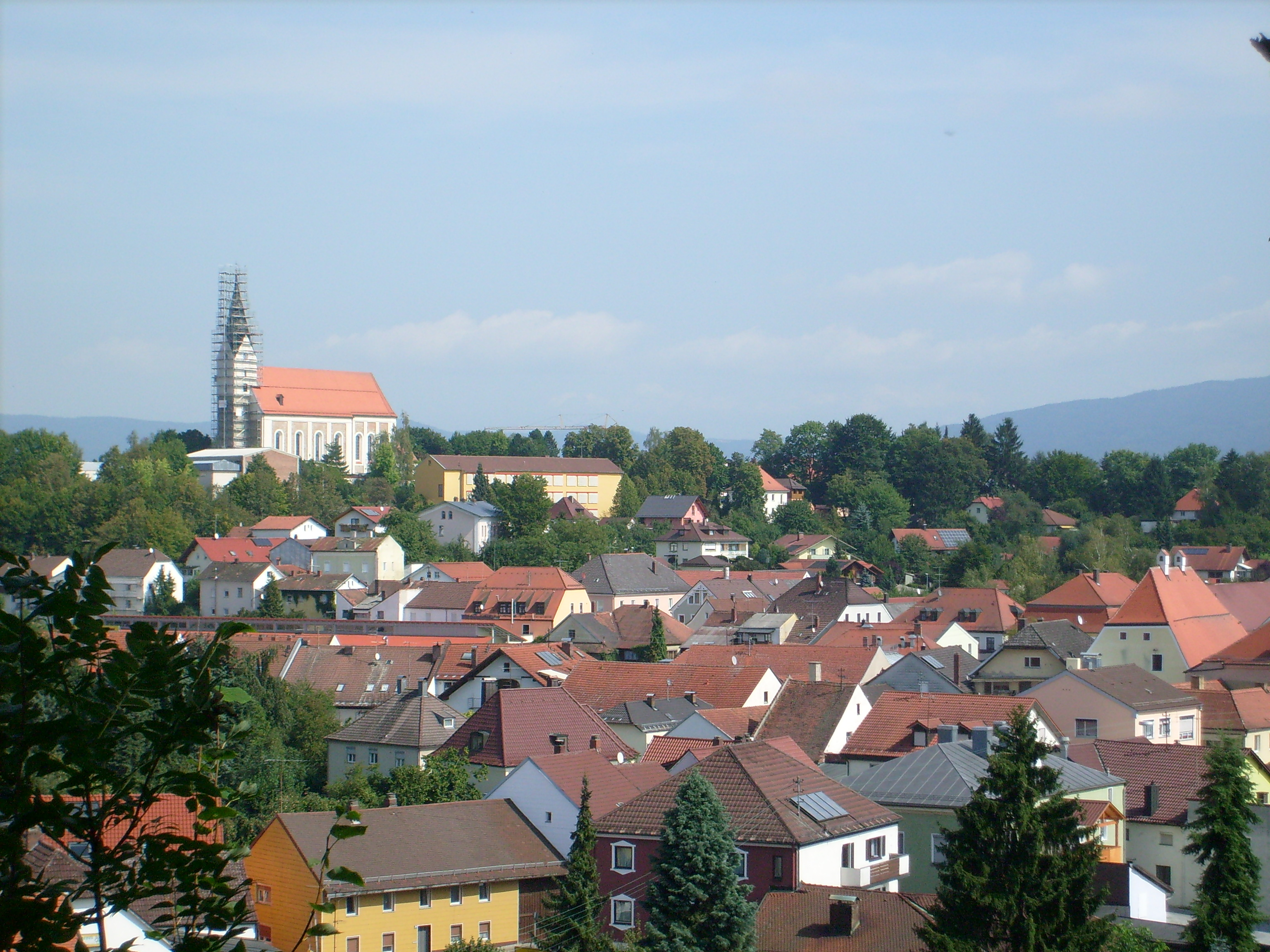
- Hengersberg

- Coat of arms

- Location of Hengersberg within Deggendorf district
- Interactive map of Hengersberg
- Location within Germany Location within Bavaria
- Coordinates: 48°47′N 13°3′E
- Country: Germany
- State: Bavaria
- Admin. region: Lower Bavaria
- District: Deggendorf

Government
  - Mayor (2020–26): Christian Meyer

Area
  - Total: 45.81 km^{2} (17.69 sq mi)
- Elevation: 311 m (1,020 ft)

Population (2025-12-31)
  - Total: 7,709
  - Density: 168.3/km^{2} (435.8/sq mi)
- Time zone: UTC+01:00 (CET)
  - Summer (DST): UTC+02:00 (CEST)
- Postal codes: 94469
- Dialling codes: 0991
- Vehicle registration: DEG
- Website: www.hengersberg.de

Hengersberg (German pronunciation: [ˈhɛŋɐsbɛʁk]) is a municipality in Bavaria, Germany, in the district Deggendorf.

== Districts ==
Districts are: Hengersberg, Altenufer, Anzenberg, Boxbach, Buch, Edermanning, Emming, Erkerding, Erlachhof, Eusching, Frohnhofen, Furth, Grubmühle, Heiming, Hinterweinberg, Holzberg, Holzerreuth, Hörgolding, Hörpling, Hub, Hubmühle, Hütting, Kading, Killersberg, Klausberg, Lapferding, Leebbergheim, Lichtenöd, Lohof, Manzing, Matzing, Mimming, Mutzenwinkl, Neulust, Nußberg, Oberanzenberg, Oberellenbach, Oberreith, Obersimbach, Pfaffing, Ponau, Rading, Reichersdorf, Reisach, Schlott, Schwanenkirchen, Schwarzach, Sicking, Siederding, Siedersberg, Thannberg, Trainding, Unterellenbach, Unterfrohnstetten, Unterreith, Untersimbach, Viehdorf, Vorderweinberg, Walmering, Waltersdorf, Weickering, Wessenhof, Würzing, Zilling.

== History ==
Hengersberg was founded 997 as "Helmgeresberg" by Gotthard of Niederalteich.
