= In Treue fest (march) =

German military march

In Treue fest (Steadfast and True) is a German military march, written by military music composer Carl Teike.

It is not possible to trace down the origins of this march's accurate time and place of composition. The first front cover of the piano edition of the march “In Treue fest” was decorated by the Flag of Bavaria and the royal coat-of-arms of Bavaria. It may be concluded that composer Carl Teike was inspired to write this march during his time in Ulm from 1883 to 1895. Carl Teike probably visited the Neu-Ulm's military post, which is located in Bavaria on the other side of the Danube. The motto “In Treue fest” definitely attracted his attention, as it was prominently featured on the uniforms of the Bavarian soldiers, on their helmet plates and belt buckles. The motto “In Treue fest” has its roots in the highest military order of Bavaria, the Bavarian Order of Saint Hubert, which was founded in 1444.

The march was used as a competition song (Japanese: 剛毅潔白) in the All-Japan Band Competition in 1958.
