= Alfred Kantor =

- Born: 7 November 1923; Prague
- Died: 16 January 2003 (aged 79); Yarmouth, Maine
- Spouse: Inge
- Children: 2

Alfred Kantor (7 November 1923, in Prague – 16 January 2003, in Yarmouth, Maine) was a Czech-born Holocaust survivor, artist and author of The Book of Alfred Kantor. His work depicted daily life in the Nazi concentration camps.

== Biography ==
Alfred Kantor was expelled in 1941 from the Rottner School of Advertising in Prague after completing only one year of his two-year commercial art program because they had learned of his Jewish identification.

=== Theresienstadt Concentration Camp ===
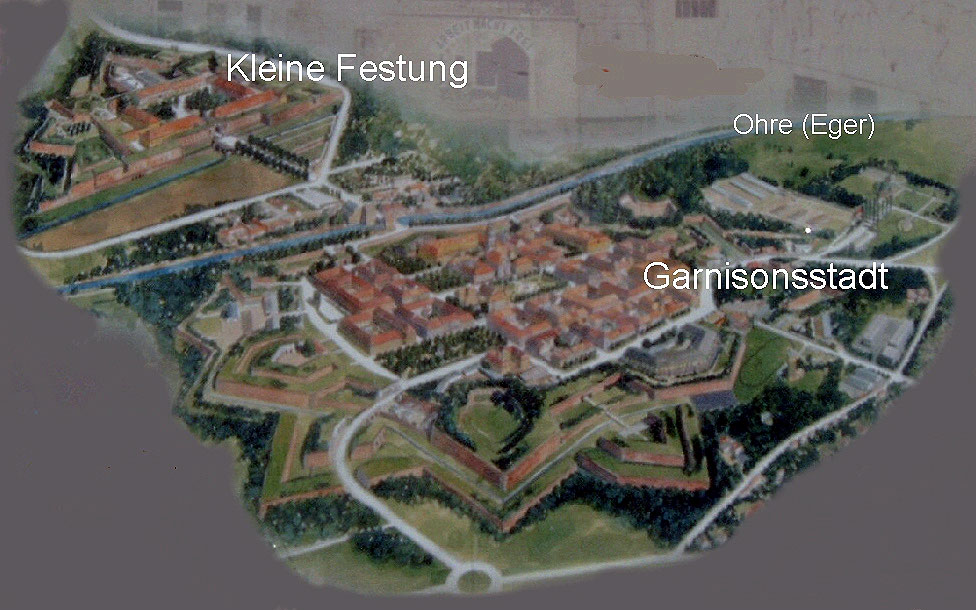
Theresienstadt Concentration Camp

Soon after Alfred Kantor had been expelled from the Rottner School of Advertising in Prague in 1941, he was transported to the Theresienstadt Concentration camp, specifically Terezin, the ghetto connected to the camp. This camp was made to delude the public into believing that concentration camps weren't bad. However, thousands still died there. In 1944, the Danish Red Cross and International Red cross came to inspect the camp, but they were only touring on previously determined routes. The Nazis prepared by completely changing the looks of this camp. They installed new shops and even replaced sickly prisoners with healthier ones. After the Red Cross left, the Nazis removed the phony shops and restored the camp to normal. This camp had about 140,000 Jews total transferred in. About 90,000 were deported and about 33,000 died in Theresienstadt.

Kantor sought out any art materials he could find. During his time there, he painted and sketched daily life. He illustrated all of the fake shops set up for the Red Cross visit in 1944. He stated in his book that he wanted to capture the extraordinary experiences in the camps to show them to the world after his liberation. Kantor eventually saw he was on a transfer list to Auschwitz and left his art to a close friend in the camp. After the camps were liberated, the friend returned them to Kantor.

=== Auschwitz Concentration Camp ===
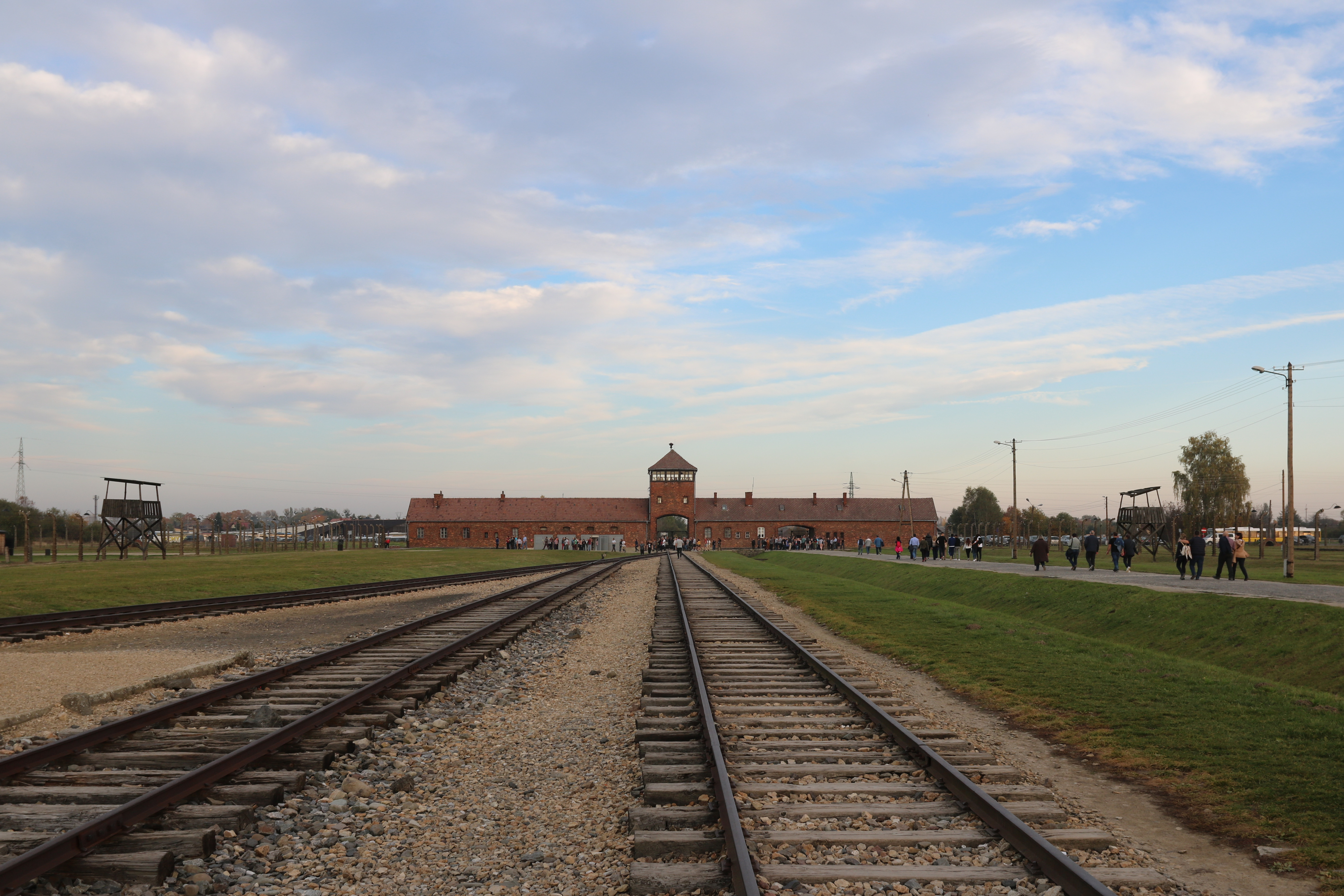
Auschwitz gate and tracks

AKantor was then deported to Auschwitz concentration camp. He had a harder time finding supplies to create his art because art was totally prohibited. A physician slipped Kantor a watercolor set while he was working at the sick ward. If he was caught painting, he would have been punished or killed. For that reason, Kantor destroyed most of the art he produced, or hid it in a place where he was sure that prison guards wouldn't be able to find it.

=== Schwarzheide Concentration Camp ===
In 1944, Alfred Kantor was relocated to the Schwarzheide concentration camp, a subcamp of the Sachsenhausen. He was assigned to the rebuilding of a synthetic fuel plant. After the war ended Kantor was transported back to Theresienstadt on April 18, 1945, along with 1,000 other prisoners. Of the 1,000 prisoners, only 175 survived the long march back.

=== After the war ===
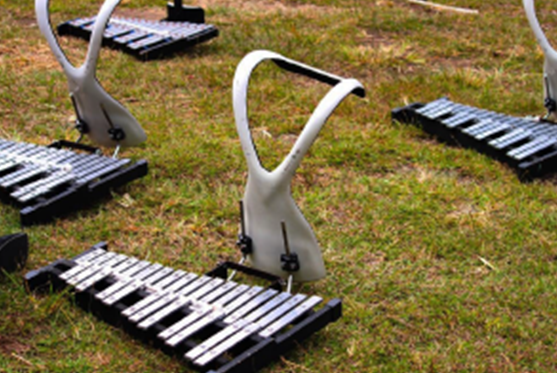
This is a glockenspiel, the instrument Alfred Kantor played in his military band.

At the end of the war, Kantor returned to Prague and went on to the Deggendorf Displaced Persons Camp in July 1945. In Deggendorf, Kantor began creating more art to detail his experience in the war. Kantor then went to the United States in 1947 and was drafted into the United States Army. Kantor ended up playing the glockenspiel in the military band. Kantor then finished his schooling and began working in the advertising business in New York.

== The Book of Alfred Kantor ==
In his book, The Book of Alfred Kantor, there are the 127 sketches and paintings most of which he had made while in the three concentration camps he was imprisoned in. The art in the book depicts the history Kantor witnessed like the infamous chief physician, Josef Mengele in his Nazi Uniform. Others in the book were re-creations since not all art was encouraged in the concentration camps. It was first published in 1971 by McGraw-Hill and the second edition was published in 1987 by Schocken Books.
