= Galaxy Award (Japan) =

The Galaxy Award (ギャラクシー賞, Gyarakushī-shō) is a Japanese production award for television, radio and commercials. It is given out annually by members of the Japan Council for Better Radio and Television. Awards are given out in four categories: television programs, radio programs, television commercials, and news programming. In each category are awarded one Galaxy Grand Prix for best program (Gyarakushī Taishō), two or three Galaxy Awards for outstanding programs (Gyarakushī Yūshūshō), and several Galaxy Awards for highly recommended programs (Gyarakushī Suisenshō). Individual and special awards are also given out. The Galaxy Award was established in 1963 and is one of the most important awards in the Japanese television industry.

== Winners ==
This is a partial list of winners:

=== Television ===
- 2000 Drama D-mode トトの世界～最後の野生児 (NHK, NHK Enterprises 21)
- 2001 TOYD (WOWOW, ProgPic Pictures, Fuji Creative Corporation)
- 2002 ETV 2003 アウシュヴィッツ証言者はなぜ自殺したか (NHK, NHK Enterprises 21)
- 2003 FNS Documentary Award とうちゃんはエジソン (FNS, Tokai TV)
- 2004 Waratte Koraete! Bunkasai Special All-Japan Band Competition (NTV)
- 2005 Tiger & Dragon (TBS)
- 2006 NHK Special working poor (NHK)
- 2007 Saibanchō no obentō (Tōkai Television Broadcasting)
- 2008 Ninzai (NHK, NHK Enterprises, Temjin)
- 2009 Shikeishū Nagayama Norio (NHK)
- 2010 Yume wa kararete (Akita Hōsō)
- 2011 Carnation (NHK)
- 2012 Tsuiseki: Fukkō Yosan 19-chōen (NHK)
- 2013 Amachan (NHK)
- 2014 Nippon sengo sabukaruchā-shi (NHK)

=== Radio ===
- 2000 Free radio Documentary 何があってもいいよネ 或るグループホームの挑戦 (QR)
- 2001 Radio Documentary いつか、旅立つ日へ(MBS)
- 2002 Joho Radio Spice! (MBS)
- 2003 King Radio Kids (Radio Kansai)
- 2004 Radio Documentary もうひとつの涙そうそう (FM Okinawa)
- 2005 伊集院光 日曜日の秘密基地 (TBS Radio)
- 2006 Special 1179 (MBS)

== See also ==
- List of Asian television awards
