= In Treue fest =

Motto of the Kingdom of Bavaria (1805–1918)

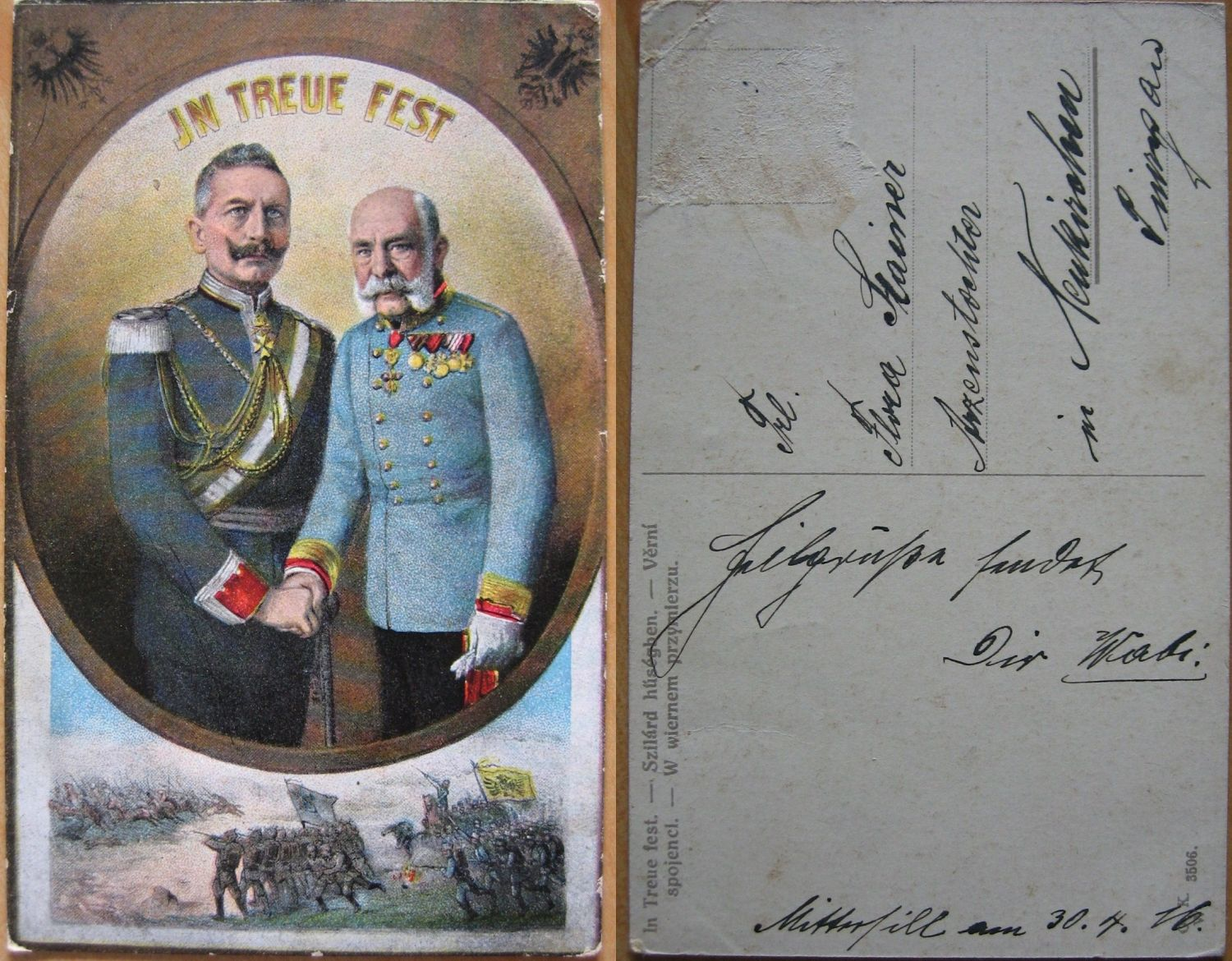
World War I era postcard (dated 30 April 1916) showing the German and Austrian emperors with the legend In Treue fest

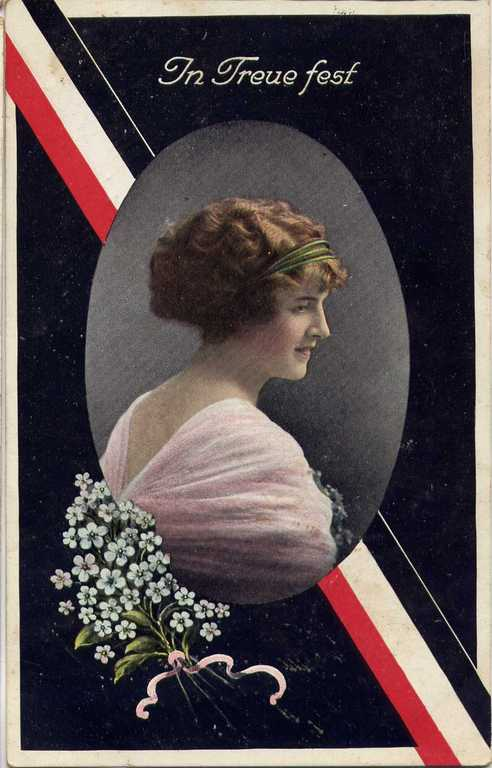
Field postcard with the "In Treue fest" motto, with the colours of the German Empire and the portrait of a woman, sent from Osnabrück in January 1916

In Treue fest (German for "steadfast in loyalty; firm in fidelity") was the motto of the Kingdom of Bavaria (1805–1918) and of its Wittelsbach rulers, after the end of World War I used by Bavarian monarchists.

The motto originates as that of the Order of Saint Hubert of the Dukes of Jülich and Berg, rendered in 15th-century Lower Franconian as in traw vast. The order was defunct during the 17th century, and revived in 1708 under Johann Wilhelm, by which time the Duchy of Jülich-Berg had passed to the Palatinate branch of the House of Wittelsbach. The order was brought to Bavaria in 1778 when Charles Theodore, Duke of Jülich and Berg and Count-Elector Palatine, succeeded his childless cousin, Maximilian III Joseph as Elector of Bavaria. In 1799, Charles Theodore was succeeded by Maximilian I Joseph of Bavaria, a member of a different branch of the house of Wittelsbach, who became the first king of Bavaria.

The motto is the title of two military marches, one by Carl Teike (1903, English title "Steadfast and True") and another by August Högn (1905). It is invoked in the final verse of the Argonnerwaldlied (1914). From 1909, the motto was embossed on the belt buckles of Bavarian troops. During the First World War, the motto was frequently reproduced on postcards and other memorabilia, often with the portraits of emperors Wilhelm II and Franz Joseph I. The "fidelity" invoked in the motto was now interpreted as referring to the loyalty of the German Empire and Austria-Hungary to their alliance of 1879 in view of the increasing political isolation of the Central Powers on the eve of the Great War. Bernhard von Bülow invoked the mutual loyalty between Germany and Austria-Hungary in 1909 as Nibelungentreue in his Reichstag speech of 29 March 1909.

After the First World War it became the motto of German monarchists and of veteran associations also outside of Bavaria. Thus, IN TREUE FEST is inscribed on the war memorial in Sörhausen, Syke, Lower Saxony. In 1921, the Bavarian nationalist and royalist league In Treue fest was founded at the Sterneckerbräu. It was banned by the Nazis on 2 February 1933, and later re-established in 1952. Because of its association with monarchism, the motto unlike other German military slogans (notably the term Nibelungentreue) remained unassociated with Nazi ideology and is still in use by a number of German associations, including Tambourcorps "In Treue fest" (Anstel, founded 1919/20), Neusser Tambourkorps "In Treue fest" (Neuss, founded 1968). Bavarian Studentenverbindung KBStV Rhaetia München (founded 1881) uses the motto cum fide virtus ("virtue with loyalty"), intended as a Latin translation of the Wittelsbacher motto; KStV Alamannia Tübingen uses the Latin translation In fide firmitas ("steadfastness in loyalty").

== See also ==
- Monarchism in Bavaria after 1918
- Bayernhymne
- Semper fidelis
