= August Högn =

German teacher, composer and historian (1878–1961)

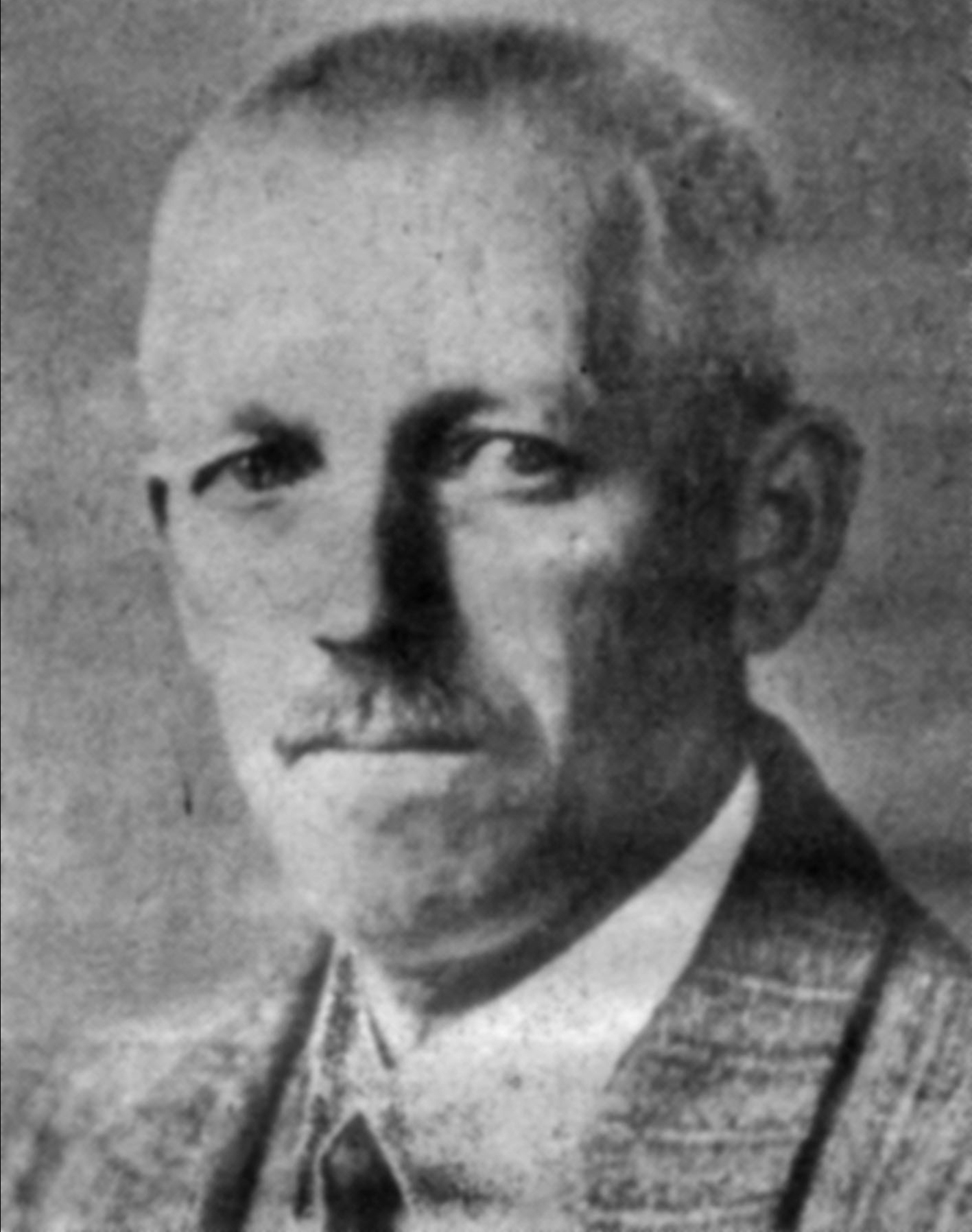
August Högn

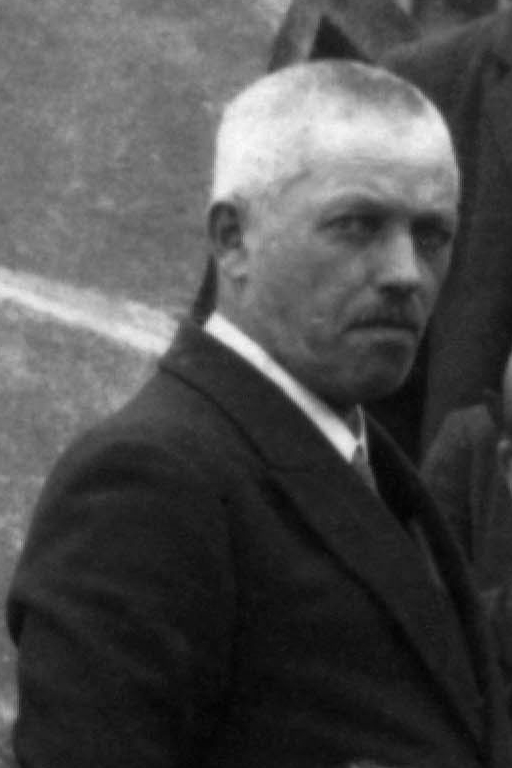
August Högn

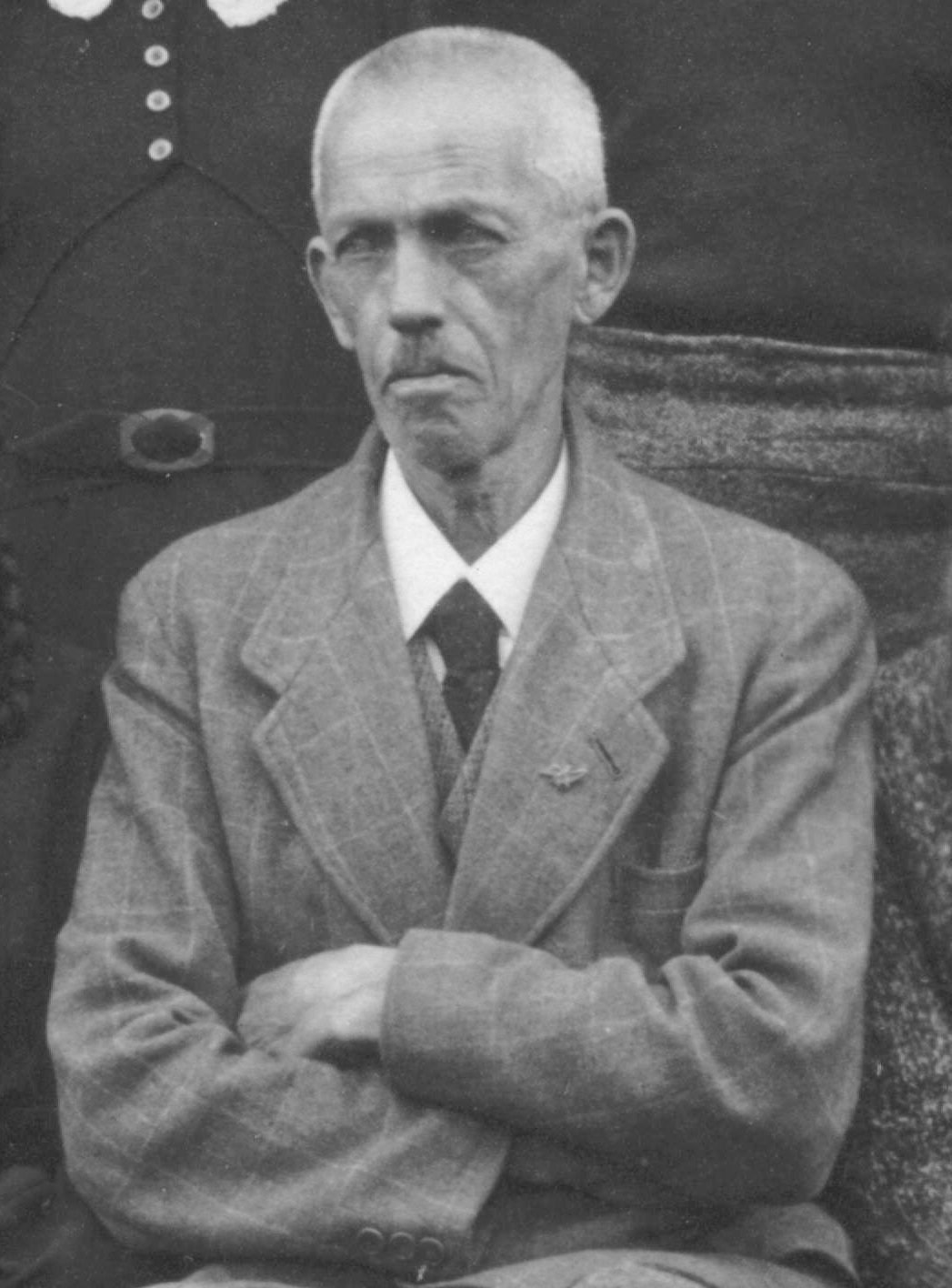
August Högn

August Högn (2 August 1878 – 13 December 1961) was a German teacher, composer and historian.

== Biography ==
August Högn was born on 2 August 1878, the middle of five children to married bookbinders Andreas and Helene Högn in Deggendorf. Like all children of the later municipality authorities, county commissioners and legislative representatives, Andreas taught August piano. He continued his studies and trained to teach at the prep school in Deggendorf (1891–1894) and at the teaching school in Straubing (1894–1896). As a young teacher he was placed in many locations (Deggendorf, Neukirchen (Niederbayern), Schaufling, Geratskirchen, Zeilarn, Wallersdorf, Eberhardsreuth).

On 20 June 1904 Högn married Emme Gerstl in Wallersdorf. From this marriage came two children (Elfriede, 14 August 1906; August, 17 January 1912). Högn was sent to Ruhmannsfelden, where he remained until his death. In his first years there he made a name for himself as dean of the gymnastics club (21 May 1910 – 27 December 1913), secretary of the Ruhmannsfelden volunteer fire dept. (26 December 1910 – 26 December 1950), and parish clerk for the neighboring Zachenberg (1913–1920). Högn's wife Emma died 26 June 1926. Following this Högn hired his housekeeper Rosa Beischmied, who lived and worked with him until his death.

In the Third Reich Högn was bound to political events as "community section leader," "subgroup leader," and commissioner for "Protector of Common Property". (Volksgut meaning the national cultural treasures that are poetry, stories, music etc..) Högn supposedly maintained good relations with his son-in-law, Karl Schlumprecht, who was the mayor of the city of Bayreuth and a member of the National-Socialist party. One should not underestimate the influence this relationship may have had on his political views during the time of Third Reich.

Högn was suspended in 1945 as a result of the nazification of teaching. He held various positions of headmaster at the school since 1921. After a short teaching stint in 1947 he retired. Högn suffered from a stroke in 1953 and was partially paralyzed. He died on 13 December 1961 in Ruhmannsfelden and was buried on 15 December in Deggendorf.

From 1926-1929 newspaper articles from Högn on local history were published. In his retirement he published three large essays regarding local history, (“History of Ruhmannsfelden” 1949, “History and Chronicles of the Ruhmannsfelden Volunteer Fire Department” 1951, and “Local History of the Zachenberg Community” 1953.)

In 1919 Högn engaged himself as singing and orchestral director of the Ruhmannsfelden gymnastics club. The musical comedy “The Holledauer Fidel” from Erhard Kutschenreuter was performed under his direction, being the largest and most successful offering of the gymnastics club.

From the ages of 20 to 76, Högn was active as singer, organist and choir leader of multiple church choirs in the Passau and Regensburg dioceses. In Ruhmannsfelden he operated most notably for 43 years as organist and in three phases as choir leader (1921–24, 1927–29, and 1940–53). His numerous religious works, including three Mass songs and thirteen Marienlieder predominantly originate from his time as choir director in Ruhmannsfelden. His first composition (Veni creator spiritus B-Dur) originates from 1898, and his final in 1960 (Marienlied Nr.13 Es-Dur). In 1905 his march In Treue fest was published.

== Works ==
=== Compositions ===
==== Religious music ====
Masses

- "Laurentius"-Messe C-Dur op. 14 (4-st. gem. Chor, Blechbläserquartett, Orgel) (Neuausgabe)
- "Mater-Dei"-Messe F-Dur op. 16 (4-st. gem. Chor, Streichquintett, Orgel) (Neuausgabe)
- "Josephi"-Messe F-Dur op. 62 (4-st. gem. Chor, Soli, 2 Vl., Blechbläserquartett, Orgel)

Tantum ergo

- Tantum ergo Nr. 1 Es-Dur op. 11 (4-st. gem. Chor, Streichquintett, Orgel) (Neuausgabe)
- Tantum ergo Nr. 2 F-Dur op. 32 (4-st. gem. Chor, Streichquintett, Orgel) (Neuausgabe)
- Tantum ergo Nr. 3 Es-Dur op. 49 (4-st. gem. Chor, Streichquintett, Orgel)
- Tantum ergo Nr. 4 A-Dur op. 49 (4-st. gem. Chor, Streichquintett, Orgel)

Pange lingua

- Pange lingua G-Dur (deutsch) (4-st. gem. Chor, Blechbläserquartett)
- Pange lingua F-Dur op. 43 (4-st. gem. Chor, Orgel)
- Pange lingua Es-Dur op. 46 (4-st. gem. Chor, Orgel)
- Pange lingua Es-Dur op. 51 (4-st. gem. Chor, Orgel)

Marienlieder

- Ave Maria F-Dur op. 4 (Unter- und Oberstimme, Orgel)
- Marienlied Nr. 1 F-Dur op. 13 a (4-st. gem. Chor, Orgel)
- Marienlied Nr. 2 e-moll op. 19 (Sopran-Solo, 4-st. gem. Chor, Orgel)
- Marienlied Nr. 3 F-Dur op. 22 (Sopran-Solo, 4-st. gem. Chor, Orgel) (Neuausgabe)
- Marienlied Nr. 4 G-Dur op. 23 (Sopran-Solo, 4-st. gem. Chor, Orgel)
- Marienlied Nr. 5 F-Dur op. 28 (4-st. gem. Chor, Orgel)
- Marienlied Nr. 6 F-Dur op. 41 (4-st. Frauenchor, Orgel) (Neuausgabe)
- Marienlied Nr. 7 G-Dur op. 45 ((fragmentarisch) Sopran-Solo, 4-st. gem. Chor, Orgel)
- Marienlied Nr. 8 G-Dur op. 54 (Sopran-Solo, 4-st. gem. Chor, Orgel)
- Marienlied Nr. 9 G-Dur op. 34 (4-st. Männerchor)
- Marienlied Nr. 10 F-Dur op. 56 (2 Sopran- und Alt-Solo, 4-st. gem. Chor, Orgel)
- Marienlied Nr. 11 F-Dur op. 59 (Bariton-Solo, 4-st. gem. Chor, Orgel) (Neuausgabe)
- Marienlied Nr. 12 F-Dur op. 63 (Sopran- und Alt-Solo, Orgel)
- Marienlied (Nr. 13) C-Dur (Sopran-Solo, Klavier o. Harmonium) (Neuausgabe)

Grablieder

- Grablied für gefallene Soldaten Es-Dur op. 35 (4-st. gem. Chor, Blechbläserquartett)
- Grablied Nr. 1 Es-Dur op. 35 (4-st. gem. Chor, Blechbläserquartett) (Neuausgabe)
- Grablied Nr. 2 Es-Dur (4-st. gem. Chor, Blechbläserquartett) (Neuausgabe)
- Grablied Nr. 3 Es-Dur op. 44 (4-st. gem. Chor, Blechbläserquartett) (Neuausgabe)
- Grablied Nr. 4 F-Dur op. 20 (Sopran-Solo, 4-st. gem. Chor, Orgel) (Neuausgabe)

Offertorien

- Offertorium D-Dur op. 26 (4-st. gem. Chor, Orgel)
- Offertorium C-Dur op. 30 (4-st. gem. Chor, Orgel) (Neuausgabe)
- Offertorium G-Dur op. 48 (4-st. Männerchor, Orgel) (Neuausgabe)

Kommunionlieder

- Kommunionlied Es-Dur op. 12 (4-st. gem. Chor, Orgel)
- Kommunionlied G-Dur op. 21 a (4-st. gem. Chor, Orgel)
- Kommunionlied G-Dur op. 21 b (4-st. gem. Chor, Orgel)
- Kommunionlied C-Dur op. 37 b (4-st. gem. Chor, Orgel)

Veni creator Spiritius

- Veni creator Spiritus B-Dur (4-st. Männerchor) (Neuausgabe)
- 11 Veni creator Spiritus op. 15
  - Veni creator Spiritus C-Dur Nr. 1 (4-st. gem. Chor)
  - Veni creator Spiritus D-Dur Nr. 2 (4-st. gem. Chor)
  - Veni creator Spiritus Es-Dur Nr. 3 (4-st. gem. Chor)
  - Veni creator Spiritus E-Dur Nr. 4 (4-st. gem. Chor)
  - Veni creator Spiritus F-Dur Nr. 5 (4-st. gem. Chor)
  - Veni creator Spiritus Fis-Dur Nr. 6 (4-st. gem. Chor)
  - Veni creator Spiritus G-Dur Nr. 7 (4-st. gem. Chor)
  - Veni creator Spiritus As-Dur Nr. 8 (4-st. gem. Chor)
  - Veni creator Spiritus A-Dur Nr. 9 (4-st. gem. Chor)
  - Veni creator Spiritus B-Dur Nr. 10 (4-st. gem. Chor)
  - Veni creator Spiritus H-Dur Nr. 11 (4-st. gem. Chor)

Adjuva nos

- Adjuva nos Es-Dur op. 8 (4-st. gem. Chor, Streichquintett, Orgel)
- 8 Adjuva nos op. 15
  - Adjuva nos C-Dur Nr. 1 (4-st. gem. Chor)
  - Adjuva nos D-Dur Nr. 2 (4-st. gem. Chor)
  - Adjuva nos Es-Dur Nr. 3 (4-st. gem. Chor)
  - Adjuva nos E-Dur Nr. 4 (4-st. gem. Chor)
  - Adjuva nos F-Dur Nr. 5 (4-st. gem. Chor)
  - Adjuva nos G-Dur Nr. 6 (4-st. gem. Chor)
  - Adjuva nos A-Dur Nr. 7 (4-st. gem. Chor)
  - Adjuva nos B-Dur Nr. 8 (4-st. gem. Chor)

Various genres

- Cäcilienlied E-Dur op. 12 b (3-st. Frauenchor, Orgel) (Neuausgabe)
- Libera e-moll op. 50 4-st. gem. Chor) (Neuausgabe)
- Benedictus G-Dur op. 50 (4-st. gem. Chor)
- Fronleichnams-Prozessionsgesänge Es-Dur op. 52 (4-st. gem. Chor, Blechbläserquartett)
- Ecce sacerdos F-Dur op. 57 (4-st. gem. Chor, Blechbläserquartett, Orgel)
- Juravit Dominus B-Dur op. 58 (4-st. gem. Chor, Blechbläserquartett, Orgel)
- "Ehre sei Gott" C-Dur (4-st. gem. Chor)
- Herz-Jesu-Litanei (verloren)

==== Secular music ====
- Marsch "In Treue fest!" D-Dur (Klavier) (Neuausgabe)
- Weihegesang Es-Dur (fragmentarisch) (4-st. gem. Chor, Blechbläserquartett)
- Lied von Gotteszell G-Dur op. 42 (Arrangement) (4-st. Männerchor)

=== Historical works ===
- Geschichte von Ruhmannsfelden (Ausgabe 2003)
- Geschichte von Zachenberg (August Högn / Anton Trellinger) (Ausgabe 2003)
- Geschichte der Freiwilligen Feuerwehr Ruhmannsfelden (Ausgabe 2003)
- heimatkundliche Zeitungsartikel: (Ausgabe 2003)
  - "Durch Gäu und Wald", Beilage zum Deggendorfer Donauboten, 6. November 1926 - "Geschichtliches vom Markt Ruhmannsfelden: Der Name "Ruhmannsfelden"; Die Bezeichnung "Markt""
  - "Durch Gäu und Wald", Beilage zum Deggendorfer Donauboten, 15. Dezember 1926 - "Geschichtliches vom Markt Ruhmannsfelden: Das Wappen von Ruhmannsfelden; Schloss und Schlossberg Ruhmannsfelden"
  - "Durch Gäu und Wald", Beilage zum Deggendorfer Donauboten, 20. August 1927 - "Geschichtliches vom Markt Ruhmannsfelden: Von der Schule in Ruhmannsfelden in früherer Zeit bis 1835"
  - "Geschichtliches vom Markt Ruhmannsfelden: Von der Schule in Ruhmannsfelden ab 1835" (Quelle aus der Chronik der Volksschule Ruhmannsfelden, vermutlich Abschrift eines Zeitungsartikels von Högn)
  - "Durch Gäu und Wald", Beilage zum Deggendorfer Donauboten, Nr. 23 / 1927 "Das Wallfahrtskirchlein Osterbrünnl bei Ruhmannsfelden"
  - "Durch Gäu und Wald", Beilage zum Deggendorfer Donauboten, Nr. 2 / 1928 - "Das Wallfahrtskirchlein Osterbrünnlein bei Ruhmannsfelden"
  - Viechtacher Tagblatt, 9. September 1928 - "Was Ruhmannsfelden für Jubiläen feiern könnte?"
  - Viechtacher Tagblatt, 25. Oktober 1928 - "Wie hat es um Ruhmannsfelden herum ausgesehen vor seiner Entstehung?"
  - Viechtacher Tagblatt, 1928/29 - "Pfarrkirche St. Laurentius Ruhmannsfelden" (in drei Artikeln erschienen)

== Recordings ==
Josephi-Messe F-Dur op. 62 (Kirchenchor Ruhmannsfelden, Kirchenchor Gotteszell, Leitung: Josef Friedrich)

- Kyrie
- Gloria
- Credo
- Sanctus
- Benedictus
- Agnus Dei

Laurentius-Messe C-Dur op. 14 (Kirchenchor Ruhmannsfelden, Brassoholics (Leitung: Andreas Stich), Gesamtleitung: August Lankes

- Kyrie
- Gloria
- Sanctus
- Benedictus
- Agnus Dei

selected works

- Marienlied Nr. 6 F-Dur op. 41 (Frauenbund Singkreis, Leitung: Elfie Piehler)
- Marienlied Nr. 9 G-Dur op. 34 (Naturvereins Sänger, Leitung: August Lankes)
- Marienlied Nr. 11 F-Dur op. 59 (Kirchenchor Ruhmannsfelden, Leitung: August Lankes)
- Cäcilienlied E-Dur op. 12 b (Frauenbund Singkreis, Leitung: Elfie Piehler)
- Offertorium G-Dur op. 48 (Naturvereins Sänger, Leitung: August Lankes)
- Marsch In Treue fest D-Dur (Klavier: Josef Friedrich)
- Marsch in Treue fest D-Dur (Musikzug Ruhmannsfelden, Leitung: Andreas Stich)
- Volksweise "Über den Bergen" (Musikzug Ruhmannsfelden, Leitung: Andreas Stich

== Interviews with coevals ==
- Interview with Wilhelm Ederer, Aug. 2002
- Interview with Barbara Essigmann, 27.12.2002
- Interview with Ida Högn, 29.12.2002
- Interview with Maria Schröck, 30.12.2002
- Interview with Barbara Essigmann, 2.1.2003
- Interview with Wilhelm Ederer, 2.1.2003
- Interview with Ida Högn, 3.1.2003
- Interview with Josef Brunner, 3.1.2003
- Interview with Doraliesa Wiegmann, 19.1.2003
- Interview with Mathilde Beischmied, 21.1.2003
- Interview with Josef Stern, 21.2.2003
- Interview with Emilie Seidl, 23.4.2003
- Interview with Lorenz Schlagintweit, 29.11.2003
- Interview with Johann Freisinger, 29.12.2003
- Interview with Stephan Leitner, 19.2.2004
- Interview with Maria Freisinger, 25.8.2004
- Interview with Max Holler, 26.8.2004
- Interview with Centa Schwannberger, 14.9.2004
- Interview with Mathilde Beischmied, 14.9.2004
- Interview with Gertraud von Molo, 23.11.2004
- Interview with Lilo Leuze, 2.12.2004
- Interview with Wilhelm Ederer, 28.12.2004
- Interview with Josef Raster, 28.12.2004
- Interview with Johann Glasschröder, 28.12.2004
- Interview mit Lilo Leuze, 14.1.2005
- Interview with Eva Ertl, 9.2.2005

== Literature ==
- Josef Friedrich: Der Mozart von Ruhmannsfelden - Leben und Werk des Schulrektors, Heimatforschers und Komponisten August Högn (1878 - 1961). Verlag Karl Stutz, Passau 2007, ISBN 978-3-88849-961-6
- Josef Friedrich: "Der Mozart von Ruhmannsfelden!" - Leben und Werk des Ruhmannsfeldener Schulrektors, Heimatforschers und Komponisten August Högn (1878 - 1961), Zulassungsarbeit zur ersten Staatsprüfung für das Lehramt an Gymnasien, eingereicht bei Prof. Dr. Siegfried Mauser im Fach historische Musikwissenschaft, Ruhmannsfelden, München, April 2005
