= Nibelungentreue =

German compound noun

Nibelungentreue is a German compound noun, literally "Nibelung loyalty", expressing the concept of absolute, unquestioning, excessive and potentially disastrous loyalty to a cause or person.

It is derived from the medieval chivalric ideal of loyalty, Middle High German triuwe, as exemplified in the second part of the Nibelungenlied, where the Burgundian kings Gunther, Gernot and Giselher refuse to hand over to Kriemhild their loyal vassal Hagen of Tronje, who is guilty of murdering Kriemhild's husband, Siegfried. The brothers place the loyalty to their friend above their obligations to their sister or to justice, leading to disaster and the complete destruction of the Nibelungs.

The modern term Nibelungentreue was coined by chancellor Bernhard von Bülow in his speech before the Reichstag on 29 March 1909. Addressing the Bosnian crisis, von Bülow invoked the absolute loyalty between the German Empire and Austria-Hungary to their Alliance of 1879 against the threat by the Entente cordiale:

Meine Herren, ich habe irgendwo ein höhnisches Wort gelesen über eine Vasallenschaft gegenüber Österreich-Ungarn. Das Wort ist einfältig. [...] aber die Nibelungentreue wollen wir aus unserem Verhältnis zu Österreich‐Ungarn nicht ausschalten. Die wollen wir vor aller Öffentlichkeit Österreich‐Ungarn gegenüber wahren.
"Gentlemen — I have somewhere read a scornful word regarding a [German] vassalage to Austria-Hungary. This is fatuous. [...] but we will not eliminate the Nibelung loyalty from our relation to Austria-Hungary. This we want to preserve towards Austria-Hungary in full public view."

The term was adopted by emperor Wilhelm II of Germany as the German Empire declared war alongside Austria-Hungary on 1 August 1914. After the defeat of the Central Powers in 1918, the notion of the Dolchstoß ("Stab in the back") also invoked the Nibelungen legend, invoking the cowardly murder of Siegfried.

Nibelungentreue was later, in East Germany during denazification and by the 1980s also in West Germany, applied (derogatively) to Nazi ideology, especially in connection with the Schutzstaffel motto, Meine Ehre heißt Treue. Used in this sense by Marxist commentators, the term describes a fanatical "Germanic" military loyalty associated with fascism and militarism. Franz Fühmann in 1955 wrote a poem called Der Nibelunge Not ("the plight/distress of the Nibelungs", the Middle High German title of the Nibelungenlied) in which he portrays the Nibelungs as a Germanic Töterdynastie ("dynasty of killers") who brought a curse on their descendants. The term is also occasionally found in English-language literature about Nazi Germany. One example is Steinberg (1990), who describes Goebbels' suicide as "a paroxysm of Nibelungentreue".

Based on this association with fascism and militarism, the term has a derogatory or ironic connotation; it describes any excessive or blind loyalty that, in the speaker's view, is bound to lead to disaster; it is frequently used in pro-Palestinian journalism denouncing the alliance of USA or Germany with Israel, or in contexts such as the American-British alliance leading to the ill-fated 2003 invasion of Iraq, but it is also used (with an ironical connotation) in unpolitical contexts such as sports journalism.

== See also ==
- In Treue fest
- Semper fidelis
