= Deggendorf =

- Town
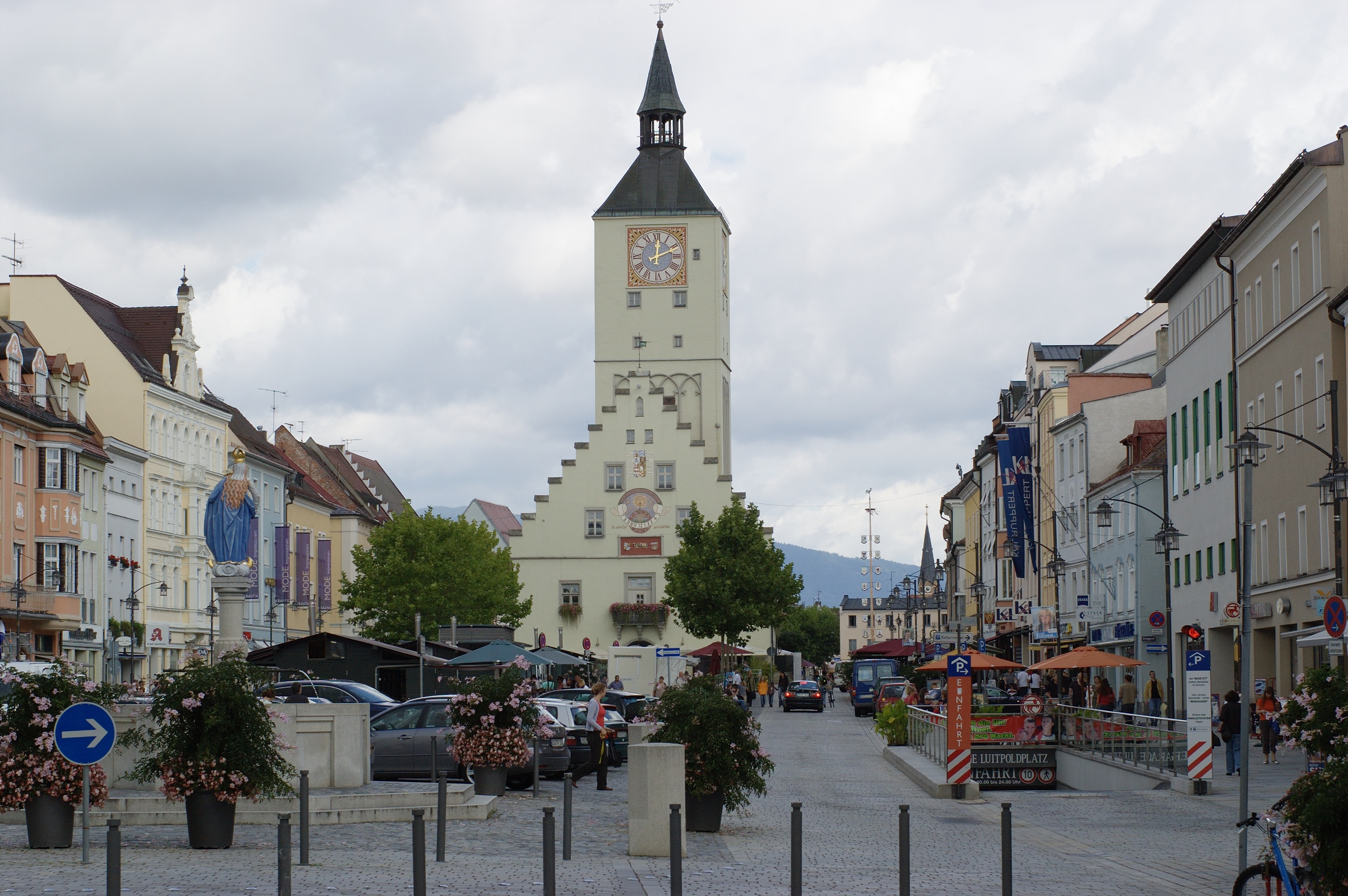
- Deggendorf Town Square

- Coat of arms

- Location of Deggendorf within Deggendorf district
- Interactive map of Deggendorf
- Location within Germany Location within Bavaria
- Coordinates: 48°50′19″N 12°57′28″E
- Country: Germany
- State: Bavaria
- Admin. region: Niederbayern
- District: Deggendorf

Government
  - Mayor (2020–26): Dr. Christian Moser (CSU)

Area
  - Total: 77.14 km^{2} (29.78 sq mi)
- Elevation: 314 m (1,030 ft)

Population (2025-12-31)
  - Total: 35,166
  - Density: 455.9/km^{2} (1,181/sq mi)
- Time zone: UTC+01:00 (CET)
  - Summer (DST): UTC+02:00 (CEST)
- Postal codes: 94469
- Dialling codes: 0991
- Vehicle registration: DEG
- Website: www.deggendorf.de

Deggendorf (German pronunciation: [ˈdɛɡn̩ˌdɔʁf]; Bavarian: Degndorf, Deggndorf) is a town in Bavaria, Germany, capital of the Deggendorf district.

It is located on the left bank approximately in the middle between the Danube cities of Regensburg and Passau. The Danube forms the town's natural border towards the south. Towards the west, north and east the town is surrounded by the foothills of the central Bavarian Forest. Near the southwestern rim of the town, the railway bridge crosses the Danube at river-kilometer 2286. Directly south of the town Autobahn A3 and A92 form an important crossing. A few miles downstream, east of the district Deggenau, lies the confluence of the River Isar with the Danube.

== Historical background ==
=== Early history ===
The earliest traces of settlement in the area were found near the Danube and date back approximately 8,000 years. Both Bronze Age and Celtic era archeological finds indicate continuous habitation through the millennia.

The first written mention of Deggendorf occurred in 868, and Henry II, Holy Roman Emperor established his supremacy over the area in 1002. Deggendorf is first mentioned as a town in 1212. Heinrich (d. 1290) of the Landshut branch of the ruling family of Bavaria made it the seat of a custom-house; and in 1331 it became the residence of Heinrich III of Natternberg (d. 1333), whose name derived from a castle in the neighbourhood. The ruins of Natternberg castle are still well preserved and a popular destination for hikers.

=== Massacre of 1336 ===
In the early 1330s, Deggendorf was an expanding market town with commerce and trade. At the beginning of that decade, however, it was caught in the middle of a conflict between the Bavarian dukes. A fire damaged large parts of the town. It is presumed that this was one of the reasons for the massive indebtedness with the local Jewish community that culminated in a massacre.

The first reference to this murder of the local Jews is found in an official document by Duke Heinrich XIV originating from 1336. In this document, the duke pardoned the citizens of Deggendorf and spared them any kind of punishment for killing the Jews. He even granted them the right to keep every item they looted from their victims.

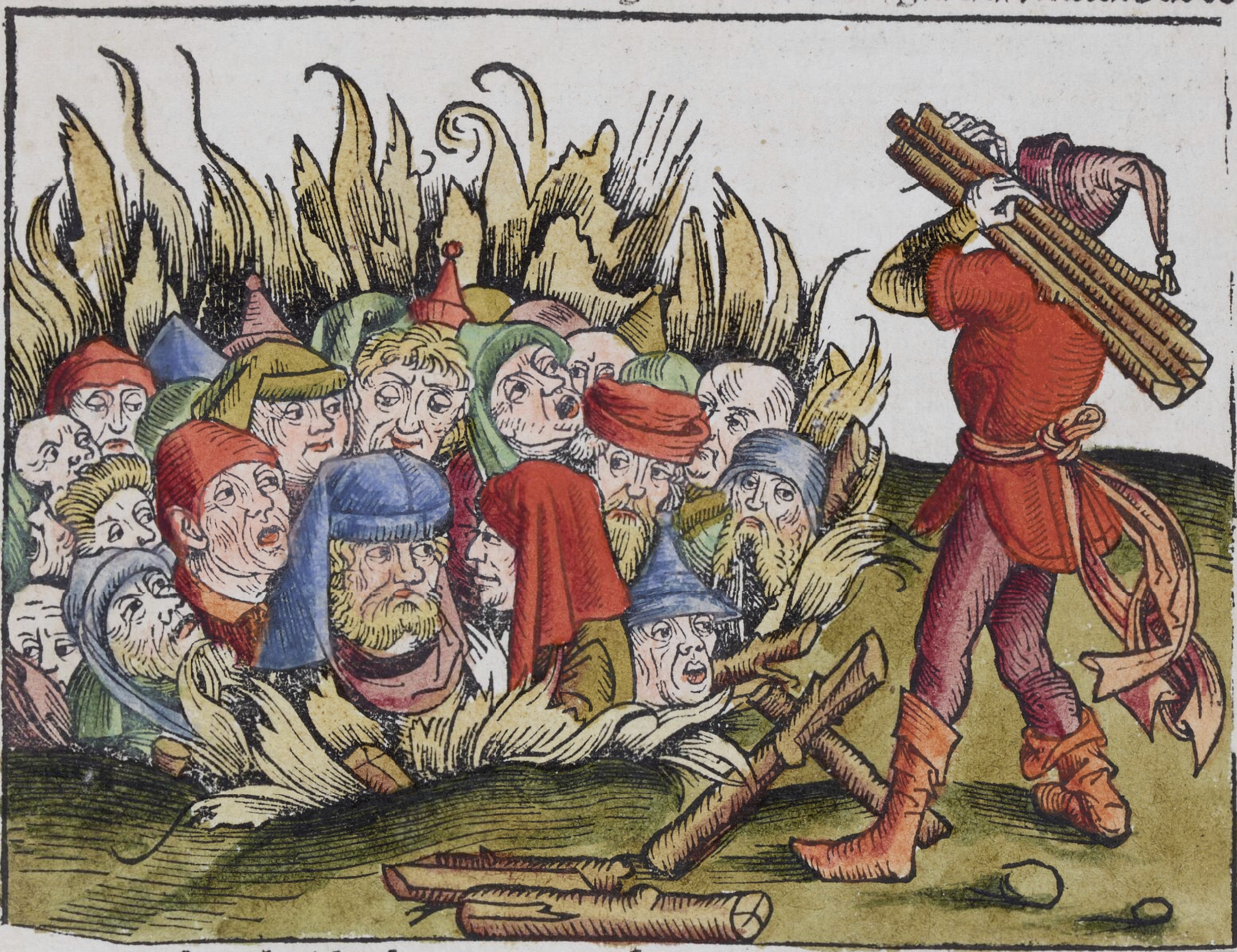
A colored woodcut in Liber Chronicarum (1493) depicts Jews being burned alive in Deggendorf.

Further clues to the murders are found, for example, in the annals of some important monasteries of the time and in the works of Johann von Viktring (d. ca. 1346). For 1338, these sources mention a plague of locusts which destroyed much of that year's crop. Johann von Viktring refers to this infestation in connection to the murder of the Jews of Deggendorf.

Yet, the inscription in the basilica of Deggendorf differs from all former sources. As the date of events it gives 1337. The Jews are purported to have set fire to the town. The body of God was found so that the community of Deggendorf started to build a church.

"Im Jahre des Herrn 1337, am nächsten Tag nach St. Michaels-Tag, wurden die Juden erschlagen, die Stadt zündeten sie an, da wurde Gottes Leichnam gefunden, das sahen Frauen und Männer, da hob man das Gotteshaus zu bauen an."

In the year of the Lord 1337, on the day after Michaelmas, the Jews were slain. They had set fire to the town. Then the body of God was found. This was seen by women and men and the building of the house of God was begun.

The wrong date indicates that this inscription stems from a much later date. The mention of the body of God points to a host desecration.

It must be assumed that the accusation of host desecration had already taken on a life of its own at that time so that further explanations were not needed. Everyone was familiar with the narratives of this legend.

The fully formed legend of the host desecration by the Jews of Deggendorf and about the miracles happening after their "punishment" appears in a composite manuscript in the library of the monastery St Emmeram in Regensburg not before the 15th century. "Das Gedicht von den Deggendorfer Hostien" (The poem of the hosts of Deggendorf) has strictly no credibility at all. Its sudden appearance centuries after the actual events took place makes just one piece of evidence for this. Its content is schematic and clichéd. Stereotypically, Easter Day is given as the date and the accusation of well poisoning is added even though it had never been mentioned before in this context. Details that could be interpreted as specific to Deggendorf are left out. The only name given is that of Hartmann von Degenberg who could not be identified as an actual historical person.

A complete deformation of reality becomes manifest in the poem. What happened in Deggendorf in 1338 is probably that the pogrom came about because of the high debts the Christian citizens owed the Jews. The locusts destroying much of the crop tightened the situation. The end of September or the beginning of October 1338 is likely the correct date (around the payday on Michaelmas.) This means the Jews were murdered for economic reasons. Events were reworked later to justify the act so that in the 15th century the stereotypical legend took on its own life.

== The course of the "Deggendorfer Gnad" ==
=== Genesis and development of attendances ===
In the years following the economic downturn and the aforementioned massacre, Deggendorf regained some of its former wealth. Thus, the construction of the basilica ("Heilig-Grab-Kirche") could be completed by 1400. By the beginning of the 15th century the fully formed legend had already spread far enough to encourage more and more people to pilgrimage to Deggendorf. An average of 40,000 people per year traveled to Deggendorf and its famous hosts. The development of the pilgrimage to become a time of worship of the magic hosts of Deggendorf was particularly promoted by pastor Johannes Sartorius (1599–1609) and Duke Albrecht of Bavaria (1584–1666). The much admired hosts, however, had been retrospectively purchased and had to be replaced regularly. During the 18th and 19th century and especially in 1737 (year of the 400-year-jubilee) the "Gnad" reached its peak attracting six-figure attendances. The pilgrimage constituted one of the major factors of the Deggendorf economy. Yet, after its peak, attendances decreased steadily until 1927. In 1970, only about 10,000 pilgrims, mainly from the Deggendorf area, took part in the festivities. The supra-regional significance of the "Deggendorfer Gnad" had been lost. In addition, only older people seemed to keep participating in the Gnad. Due to these developments the town pursued a thorough advertising campaign combined with a redesign of the festivities in 1976 resulting in a slight increase in younger peoples’ attendance figures. The growing critique of the "Deggendorfer Gnad" can also be regarded as a reason for the decrease in attendance figures.

=== The course of the pilgrimage ===
The pilgrimage started with a ceremonial inauguration and the ritualized unbarring of the "Gnadenpforte," a.k.a. the church door of the basilica "Heilig-Grab-Kirche," on 29 September (Michaelmas Day).

On 30 September, a church parade with the magic hosts in a monstrance constituted the highlight of the pilgrimage. In 1962, a vespertine church parade was added to the programme in order to increase the pilgrimage's appeal.

The pilgrimage concluded with a sermon at 4pm on 4 October and the ritualistic barring of the basilica's church door. In 1973, the vespertine church parade was rescheduled from 30 September to 4 October, and from then on combined with the concluding rituals.

== End of the pilgrimage ==
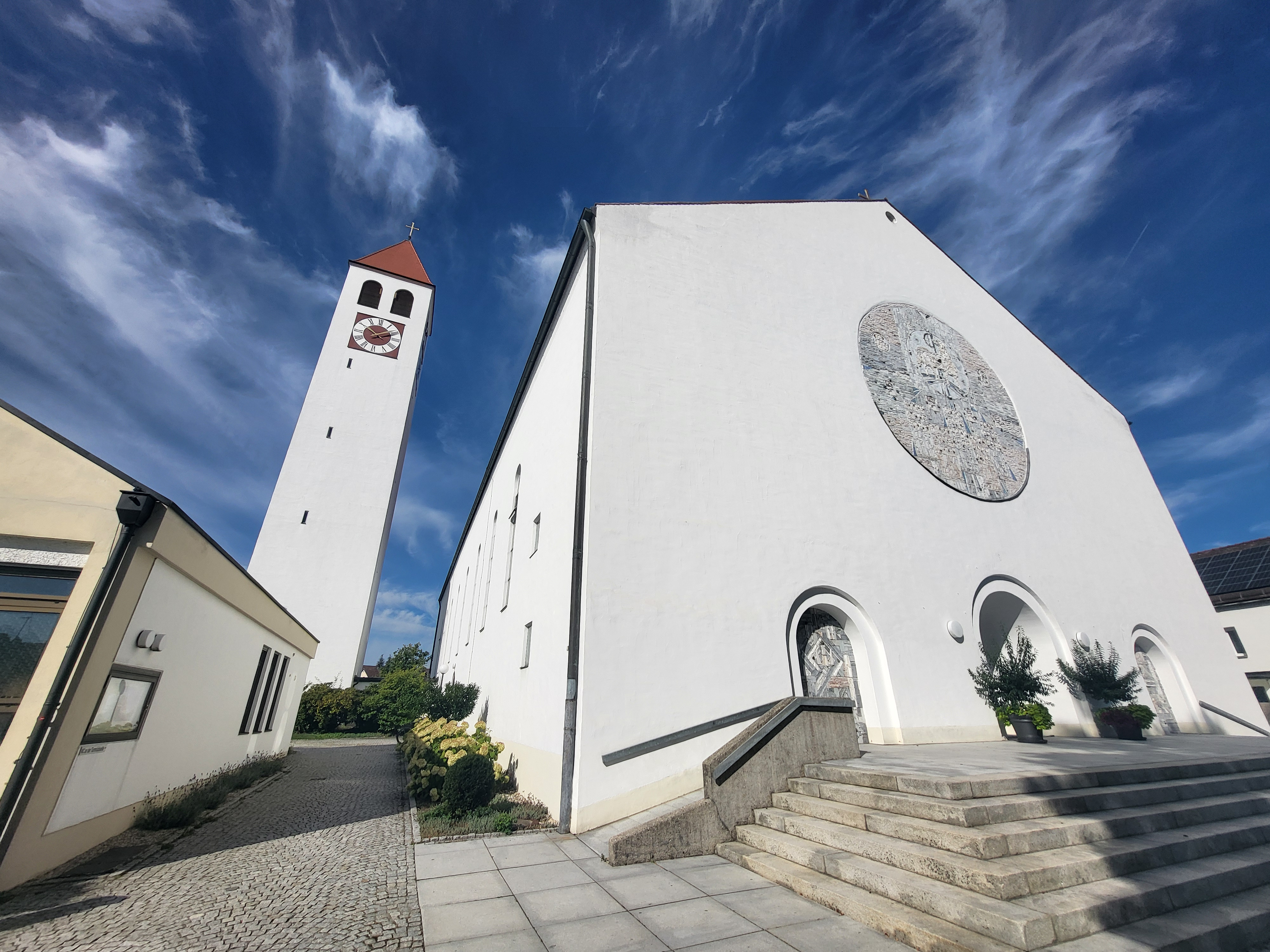
St. Martin's Church

It was not before the 1960s that the "Deggendorfer Gnad" attracted more and more criticism. It was demanded to remove all anti-Jewish depictions showing them in the middle of the alleged host desecration. Among these was a cycle of sixteen oil paintings, the hosts themselves and the "Judenstein" (an anvil with Jewish figures around it and floating hosts).

Even though the debate quickly became a heated topic in the press – abroad as well as domestic – it took until 1968 for the first four of the sixteen oil paintings to finally be removed, which was the first concession. The debate quickly polarized. While some saw the "Deggendorfer Gnad" as anti-Semitism in its purest form, others thought it just a piece of Bavarian folklore. The diocesan chapter of Regensburg invoked the long tradition of the pilgrimage and assured that the Jews as its cause were hardly ever mentioned in the sermons.

In the 1980s, Manfred Eder (University of Regensburg) started work on his doctoral thesis carefully researching the origin and development of the "Deggendorfer Gnad". On the basis of his findings, the diocese of Regensburg finally decided to abolish the pilgrimage. Bishop Manfred Müller asked for forgiveness for the centuries-long defamation of the Jews. In 2017, Richard Utz linked the tardy discontinuation (thirty years after the Second Vatican Council) of the pilgrimage tradition to a decision by Regensburg Bishop, Rudolf Graber. In the late 1960s, Graber replaced a chair in Judaic Studies with one in Dogmatic Theology at the newly founded University of Regensburg. A chair in Judaic Studies would have sped up the production of the kind of research that would have debunked the tradition's false claims.

== Displaced persons camp ==
Deggendorf was the site of a displaced persons camp for Jewish refugees after World War II. It housed approximately 2,000 refugees, who created a cultural center that included two newspapers, the Deggendorf Center Review and Cum Ojfboj, a theater group, synagogue, mikvah, kosher kitchen, and more. The camp even issued its own currency known as the Deggendorf Dollar. Many of the camp's residents were survivors of the concentration camp at Theresienstadt. The displaced persons camp closed on 15 June 1949.

== Lord Mayors ==
- 2000-2012 Anna Eder (born 1950) (CSU)
- since 2012 Christian Moser (born 1977) (CSU)

== Twin towns – sister cities ==
Deggendorf is twinned with:

- Neusiedl am See, Austria
- Písek, Czech Republic

== Notable people ==
- Georg Rörer (1492–1557), Lutheran theologian
- August Högn (1878–1961), teacher, local historian and composer
- Kathrin Passig (born 1970), journalist and writer
- Django Asül (born 1972), comedian
- Katrin Ebner-Steiner (born 1978), politician
- Robin Yalçın (born 1994), footballer
- Gudrun Stock (born 1995), cyclist
