= Order of Saint Hubert =

Roman Catholic dynastic order

Royal Order of Saint Hubert
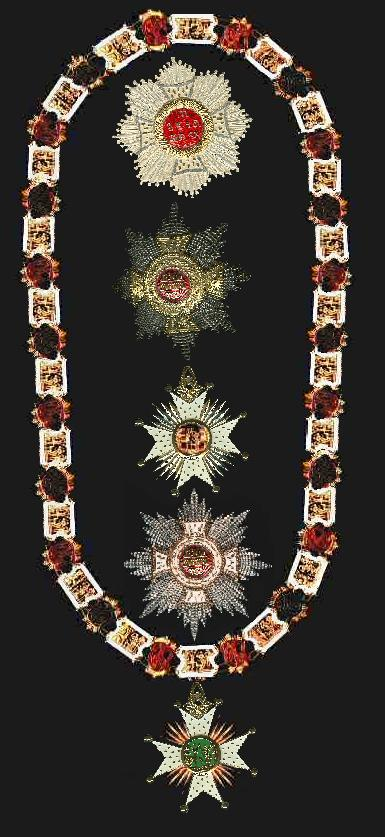
- Collar of the Grand Master, plus exemplars of the Knights Cross, Order of Saint Hubert

Awarded by The Head of the Bavarian Royal Family
- Type: Catholic chivalric order
- Royal house: House of Jülich (1444–1609); House of Wittelsbach (1609–present)
- Motto: In Treue Fest (Firm in Fidelity)
- Status: Rarely Constituted
- Founder: Gerhard VII, Duke of Jülich-Berg
- Sovereign: Franz, Duke of Bavaria
- Grand Master: Prince Max
- Grades: Knight Grand Cross with Collar; Knight Grand Cross

Precedence
- Next (higher): None (Highest)
- Next (lower): Royal Order of Saint George for the Defense of the Immaculate Conception; Royal Order of Saint Elizabeth

The Royal Order of Saint Hubert (German: Sankt Hubertus Königlicher Orden), or sometimes (German: Königlicher Orden des Heiligen Hubertus) is a Roman Catholic dynastic order of knighthood founded in 1444 or 1445 by Gerhard VII, Duke of Jülich-Berg. He sought to commemorate his victory over the House of Egmond at the Battle of Linnich on 3 November, which is Saint Hubert's day.

The establishment of the Order occurred during a long-term, intermittent territorial dispute, initially between the Dukes of Jülich and the Dukes of Guelders, who were descended from a female line of the House of Jülich. The dispute began in the 1430s, when Arnold, Duke of Gelderland claimed the duchy of Jülich and the county of Ravensberg, and was resolved in the 1614 Treaty of Xanten, which established the United Duchies of Jülich-Cleves-Berg of the counties of Ravensberg and Mark with the duchies of Cleves, Jülich and Berg. In 1778, Charles Theodore, Duke of Jülich and Berg and the Count-Elector Palatine, succeeded his childless cousin, Maximilian III Joseph, Elector of Bavaria and brought the Order to Bavaria.

Initially, the order was open to men and women, although limiting the number of male companions to sixty. It commemorated the conversion of Saint Hubert and his standing as the patron saint of hunters and knights. Over time, the award had other uses as a reward for loyalty to the monarch and service to the princely state.

== History ==
=== Foundation ===
Sources agree that the Order of Saint Hubert honors a military victory of the Duke of Jülich, on Saint Hubert's day, 3 November 1444. Sources differ on the specific date of establishment of the Order, whether it celebrated the victory at the Battle of Linnich between Gebhard V of Jülich and Arnold of Egmont (or Egmond), or commemorated the battle at a future date. Consequently, the date of the founding depends on the source. (Note: For examples of contradictions, see Alban Butler. The lives of the fathers, martyrs, and other principal saints. Dublin: James Duffy, 1866, p. 63 or Hugh Chisholm, "Knighthood: Orders of Knighthood (Bavaria)." Encyclopædia Britannica. New York, The Encyclopædia Britannica Co., 1910–11. Volume 15. p. 863.) Still other sources date the founding of the Order as late as 1473 or 1475.

Twentieth century investigation has helped to clear up some of the confusion. The original Latin statutes of the foundation use Good Friday, in this case 26 March 1445. Furthermore, there is clear written evidence that the Order existed prior to March 1445: The original German statutes were dated immediately after the battle. It is also possible that Gerhard proclaimed the establishment of the Order immediately after the victory of his knights at Linnich, but the documents were not drawn up until later, leading to discrepancy in the dates of 1444 or 1445. To further obfuscate the date of founding, Gerhard's son, William III, renewed the Order upon his own succession to the ducal dignities in 1475, in the so-called New Statutes, which were prepared in Latin and German. These remained the governing documents of the Order until 1708. In this confirmation probably lies the root of confusion over the date of the Order's foundation.

Initially the Order was a knightly brotherhood (Rittersbruderschaft), reflecting the overlapping religious and military aspects of medieval court life. Saint Hubert was the patron saint of hunters and knights. The founding of the Order of the Golden Fleece in the early 15th century started a trend in confraternal princely orders. The purpose of these, whether established by monarchs or princes, was to foster loyalty to a sovereign, replacing to the old Chivalric orders developed in the Crusades. Although some historians classify the Order of the Saint Hubert as a confraternal order, during its 600-year-life, its purpose changed as the fortunes and needs of the Dukes of Jülich and Berg and their successors changed.

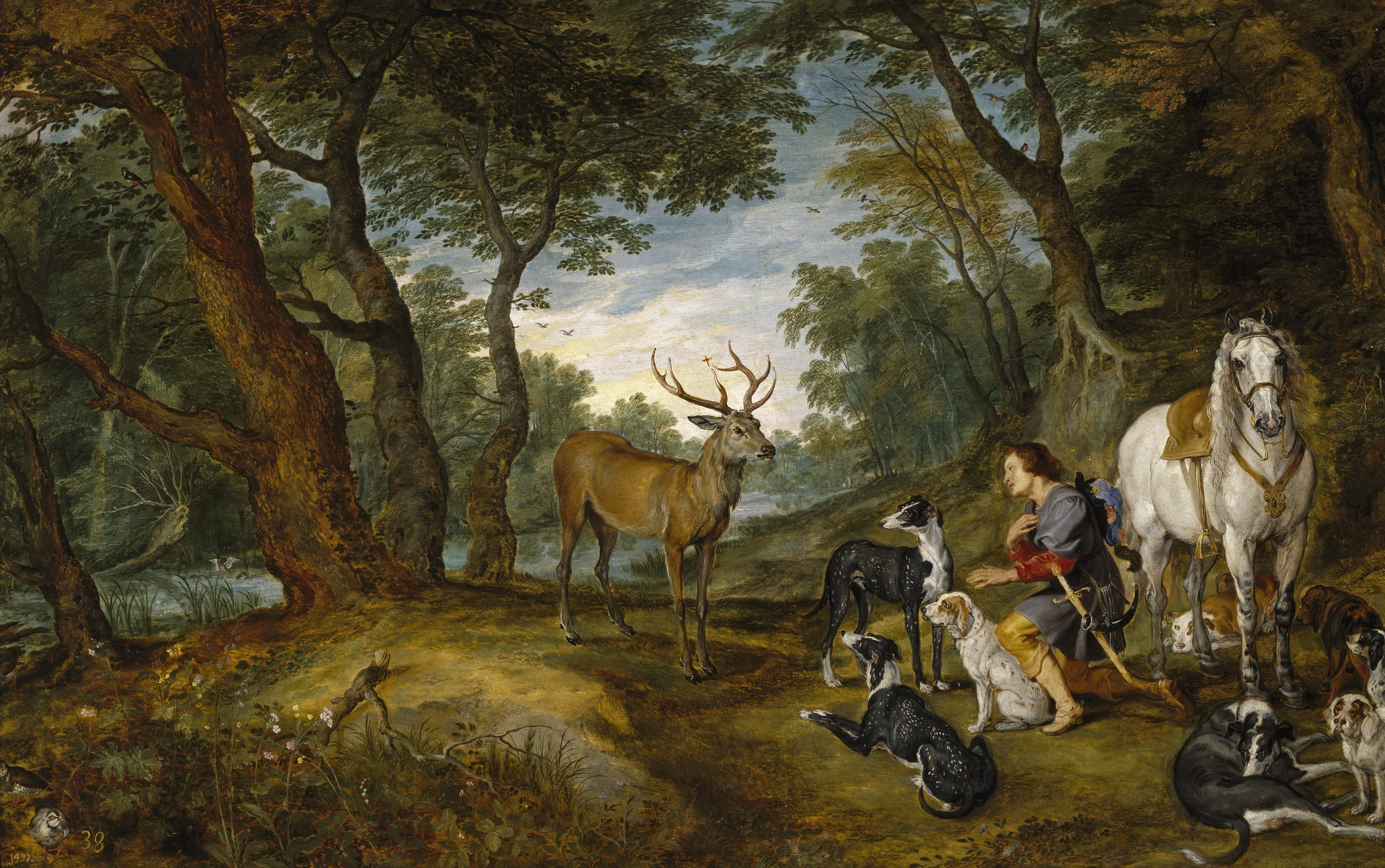
Hubert of Liège was the patron saint of hunters and knights.

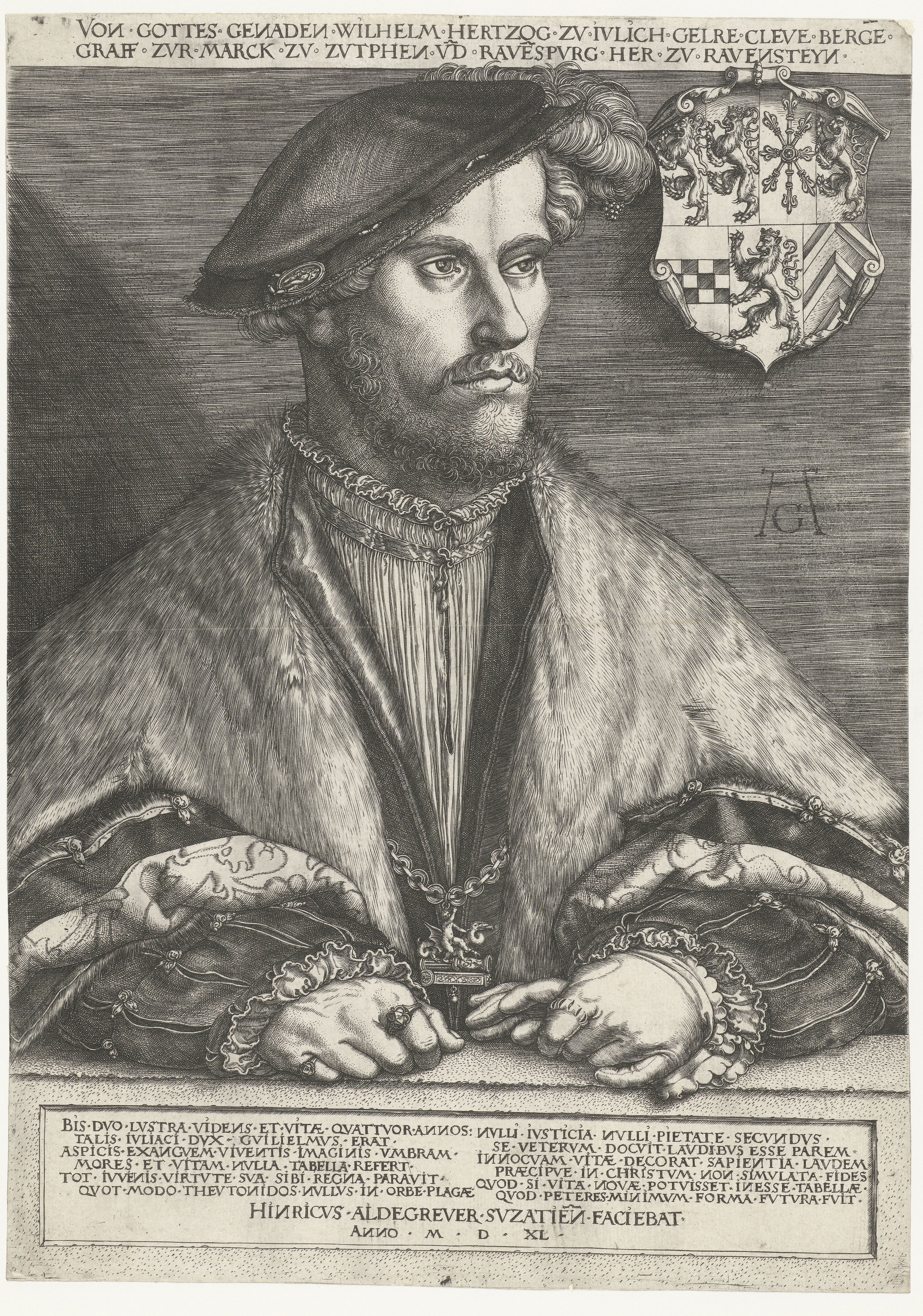
Wilhelm, Duke of Jülich-Cleves-Berg, also known as Wilhelm the Rich, grandmaster of the Order at his ascension to the dukedom in 1539. Engraving by Heinrich Aldegrever.

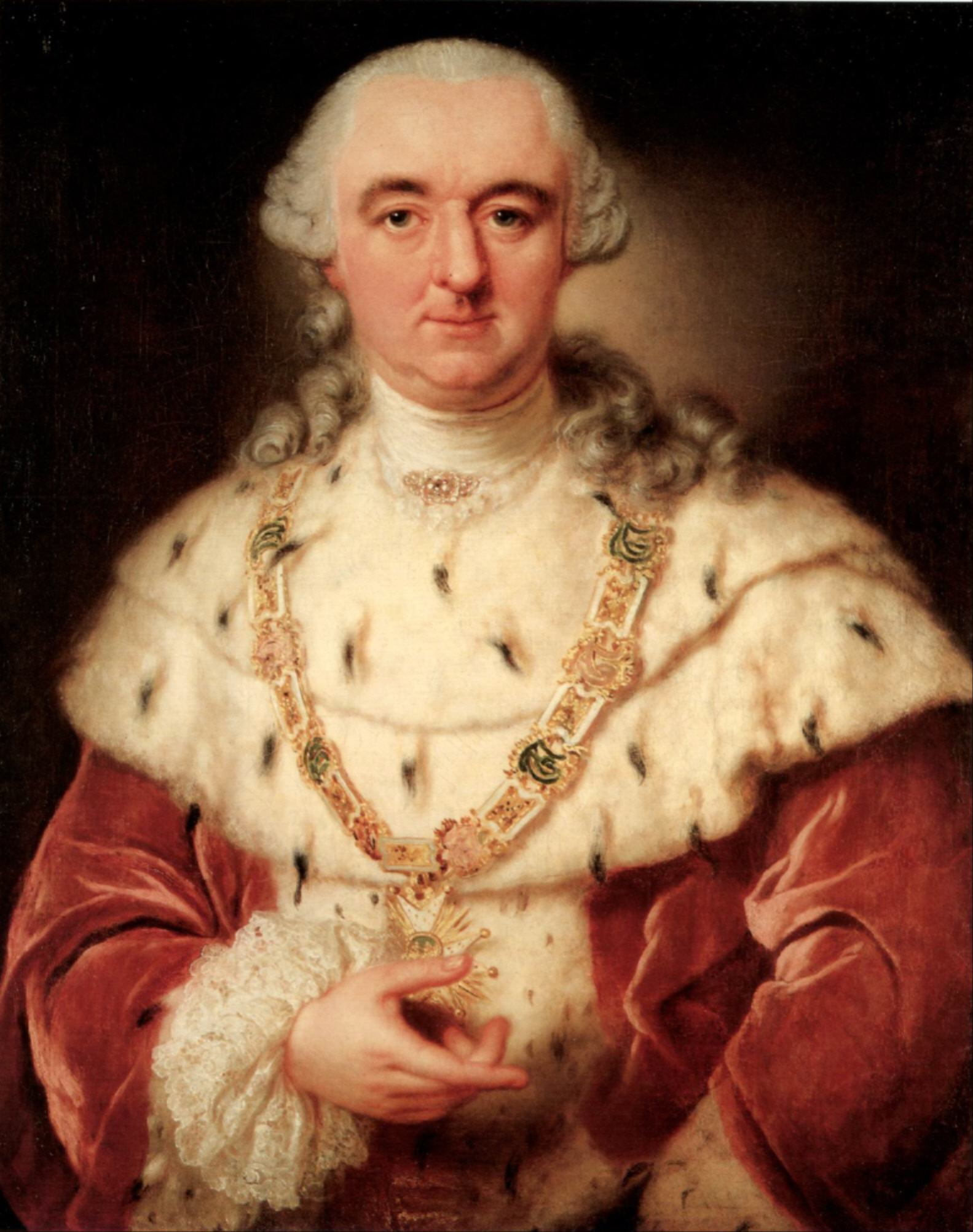
Charles IV Theodore, Elector of Bavaria, wearing the collar and medallion of the guardian of the order

=== Order under the House of Jülich ===
When Reinhold IV, Duke of Gelder, died in 1423, his nephew Arnold inherited the dukedom. Arnold's cousin, Adolf of Berg, inherited territories near Liège. Arnold believed that Adolf had inherited the better of the two properties, and coveted it for himself. He tried to take it by force and failed; a compromise was reached by which the two agreed to a truce. Adolf of Berg died in 1437 and his cousin, Gerhard IV, the Duke of Jülich and Count of Ravensburg (Westphalia), inherited both the Liège properties and the Duchy of Berg. Arnold reasserted his old claim, maintaining that the truce to which he and Adolf agreed was no longer valid, and prepared to take the duchies by force. Confident in his right to the inheritance, Gerhard met Arnold in battle, at the village of Linnich, in the county of Ravensburg (Westphalia). He and his knights defeated Arnold and his knights on Saint Hubert's day in 1444. (Note: One source dates the battle in 1447, not 1444, but this is not documented in other texts. William Guthrie, John Knox and James Ferguson date the battle in 1447.) In celebration, Gerhard declared the founding of the Order, to reward his loyal and victorious knights.

The Order remained in collateral branches of the family of the Dukes of Jülich and Berg until 1521, when the male line holding the two duchies and the county of Ravensberg became extinct. A daughter, Maria von Geldern, remained to inherit the duchies and the county, but, under the Salic law practiced in the northwestern German states, women could only hold property through a husband or guardian. Consequently, the territories passed to her husband—who was also her distant relative—John III, Duke of Cleves and Mark. The couple had three daughters, one of whom, Ann of Cleves, married Henry VIII of England in 1540, and one son, Wilhelm, who subsequently inherited the duchies and the administration of the Order. The duchies included most of the present-day North Rhine-Westphalia that lay outside the ecclesiastical territories of the Electorate of Cologne and Münster. Wilhelm was known as Wilhelm the Rich.

=== Order under the House of Wittelsbach-Palatine ===
In March 1609, Duke John William of Jülich-Cleves-Berg died childless. Both Duke Wolfgang William of Palatinate-Neuberg and Elector John Sigismund of Brandenburg claimed the territories. In the subsequent succession chaos, the Order fell into disuse. By the late 17th century, the Duchy of Jülich passed into the jurisdiction of the Prince-Elector Johann Wilhelm, Duke of Neuberg, who descended from a cadet branch of the Palatine line of the House of Wittelsbach. In May 1708, he restored the Order of Saint Hubert and assumed the position of grand master for himself. To reward loyalty and service, he conferred the cross of the Order on several of his courtiers. He also gave the recipients generous pensions on the condition that a tenth be set aside for the poor, and a significant sum be distributed on the day of their reception into the order.

In 1777, the death of Maximilian III Joseph of Bavaria without a legitimate male heir ended the main line of Wittelsbach; after the War of the Bavarian Succession, a brief and relatively bloodless contest, Charles Theodore inherited his cousin's dignities. The Order moved with the new Elector to Bavaria, where it eventually was confirmed again on 30 March 1800 by Maximilian IV, Elector of Bavaria. In the French Revolutionary and Napoleonic wars, the Order functioned primarily as a military order, similar to the Military Order of Maria Theresa or the Order of Leopold. The present head of the House of Wittelsbach, Franz Bonaventura Adalbert Maria, Duke of Bavaria, is the current Grand Master of the order.

== Structure and requirements ==
Initially, hierarchy of membership was relatively flat. The statutes called for a grand master, in this case the Duke of Jülich, four masters, and a provost, or arms master. Of the four masters, two were required to be representative of families of the Duchies of Jülich or Berg; the origins of the others had no geographic limitations. The masters were the clearing house for membership; they investigated the admission of new members and any alleged infractions by the existing membership. The Provost, a weapons master, maintained the weapons and arms of the brotherhood, and himself wore a special medallion.

The Order was open to men and women, and both genders were entitled companions. Until 1476, there were no limits on the number of companions to be admitted, but that year, with the new edition of the Order's statutes, the Duke limited the number of men to 60; unlimited women could be admitted. The editions of the Order's statutes, two in Latin and two in German, established similar requirements for membership. The Latin editions stipulated that the man be of noble birth—eight generations of noble grandparents—and of unblemished reputation; the German versions required that only four grandparents of the man be noble. Women were to be spouses of a companion; in the 1476 versions of the statutes, both Latin and German, female members of the Duchess' household could be admitted even if their husbands were not members or if the women were single, but were required to resign if they left the service of the Duchess. The exception to this clause provided for their continued membership if their husbands became companions of the order.

=== Restructuring under Maximilian Joseph IV ===
In confirming the Order, on 18 May 1808, the King of Bavaria declared the Order to be the first in the kingdom and linked it to the Order of Civic of Merit. He limited membership to twelve knights from the ranks of counts and barons, excluding himself, as grandmaster, and members (native and foreign), who may be nominated by the sovereign. Entrance fees were 200 gold ducats for princes. (Note: In 1819, a Bavarian gold ducat was valued at 3 shillings and 11 pence in British currency. Using 1830 rates, 200 ducats converts to £3680 (Retail Price Index) or £41,600 ($76,000 US) in average earnings in 2008. In 1808, £1 equaled $4.63 (US). A gold ducat was 0.1107 troy ounce, and 200 ducats were 22.14 troy ounces.) Those under the rank of prince paid an entrance fee of 100 silver ducats, which amounted to 120 Reichsthaler; the silver Reichsthaler was 29.44g of .989 fineness. He also established a dress costume for festival days, which included not only the insignia of the Order, but a black collar with a sash, narrow, short breeches with poppy-colored garters and bows, a short black cape, a sword, and a plumed hat. (Note: The plumes denoted the rank of the knight, i.e., a plume of red and white or blue and white feathers on the hat of the Grand master, plumes of red feathers on the hats of princely knights and without plumes on the hats of the other knights.) Ludwig II was laid in state and was buried in this apparel.

== Collars, Badges and Stars ==
An unidentified recipient of the Order of Saint Hubert, prior to 1823

The gold-enameled cross lies in a white field, and surmounted by a crown; on one side is represented the conversion of Saint Hubert, with the legend In trau vast (firm in fidelity) in Gothic letters. On the reverse, lies the imperial orb and the Latin inscription "In memoriam recuperatæ dignitatis a vitæ 1708" ("In remembrance of the restoration of the original dignity, 1708"). Originally, it consisted of a collar and a pendant jewel. The Jülich collar consisted of stylized horns (six for men, four for women), intertwined with a cloud-like figure eight. The jewel depicted a relief of the conversion of Saint Hubert. Its overall design alluded to the Saint as the patron of hunters, and thus the patron of knights. The great cross was only worn on special days; on all other days, a smaller cross must be worn, and the member was fined 20 thalers for any and each omission). The smaller cross was decorated appropriately for its size.

The collar of the Order under the Wittelsbach dynasty consisted of forty-four gold links, twenty-two of which consisted of a rectangular representation of the conversion of Saint Hubert (Note: I.e., St. Hubert in the center kneeling before a deer bearing a cross between it antlers coming out forest foliage on the left and a man standing behind St. Hubert holding his horse and raising his hat at the sight on the right.) in open relief surrounded by a gold and white enamel frame. These alternated with twenty-two other links consisted of the intertwined initial letters of the motto In trau vast, (firm in fidelity), i.e., I, T and V in Gothic letters radiating small golden rays, each of these links being alternatively enameled red or green. From the center rectangular link hung a white enameled Maltese cross, each arm strewn with numerous small golden flames and each point of the cross was tipped with a small gold ball. Between each arm of this cross were five straight gold rays and in the center of the cross was a round medallion bearing a golden representation in relief of the conversion of Saint Hubert against a green enamel background. The reverse of this cross bore the same design with this same representation but against a red enamel background. (Note: There is also a variant of this cross worn by the officials of the Order, i.e., the Herald, the Treasurer and the Keeper of the Wardrobe. This cross has five wavy rays in each angle, while each of the limbs of this heraldic cross bears a lion rampart in different colored enamels. The upper limb of this cross the lion is red on white (the arms of Berg); on the right limb the lion is gold on black (arms of the Upper Palatine); on the left limb the lion is black on gold (the arms of Jülich) and on the lower limb the lion is gold on blue (arms of Geldern). The enameling on the reverse of this cross is "bendy fussily argent and azure" (the arms of Bavaria) "impaling or, a fesse argent and gules" (the arms of Mark) in the upper limb; "gules, an escarbuncle or" (the arms of Cleves) on the right limb; "argent, three chevronels, gules" (the arms of Ravensburg) on the left limb and "or, a fesse sable" (the arms of Moers) on the lower limb.)

The links from the collar of the Order

The sash of the Order was poppy red moire with narrow green borders, but under the knot, at the ends of this sash, these green borders as well as the ends of the sash were covered with gold metallic ribbon. Like the sash of the Order of the Garter this sash was worn from the left shoulder to the right hip. The cross worn with this sash was a Maltese cross with narrow arms also enameled white strewn with numerous golden flames, with three straight rays between each arm, each point of the cross being tipped with a small gold ball. Between the two gold balls on the top arm of the cross was a three-dimensional gold representation of the Bavarian crown, by which the cross hung from its sash. In the center of the cross was a large round medallion consisting of a small golden representation of the conversion of Saint Hubert against a green enamel background and surrounded by a wide border in red enamel with the motto the order In trau vast in Gothic letters set with small diamonds. On the reverse, in the center of the cross was a golden representation in relief of the imperial orb and cross (i.e., the heraldic symbol of the Prince-Elector as the Arch-Steward of the Holy Roman Empire) against a red enamel background and surrounded with a white enamel scroll-like border with the inscription "In memoriam recuperatae dignitatis aviate. 1708" ("In remembrance of the restoration of the original dignity, 1708"). The star of the order, worn on the left breast, was a radiant silver star of eight points surrounding a gold, white enameled cross pattée strewn with golden flames and with a round poppy red enameled central medallion bearing the motto In trau vast in golden Gothic letters and surrounded by a white enameled and gold border.

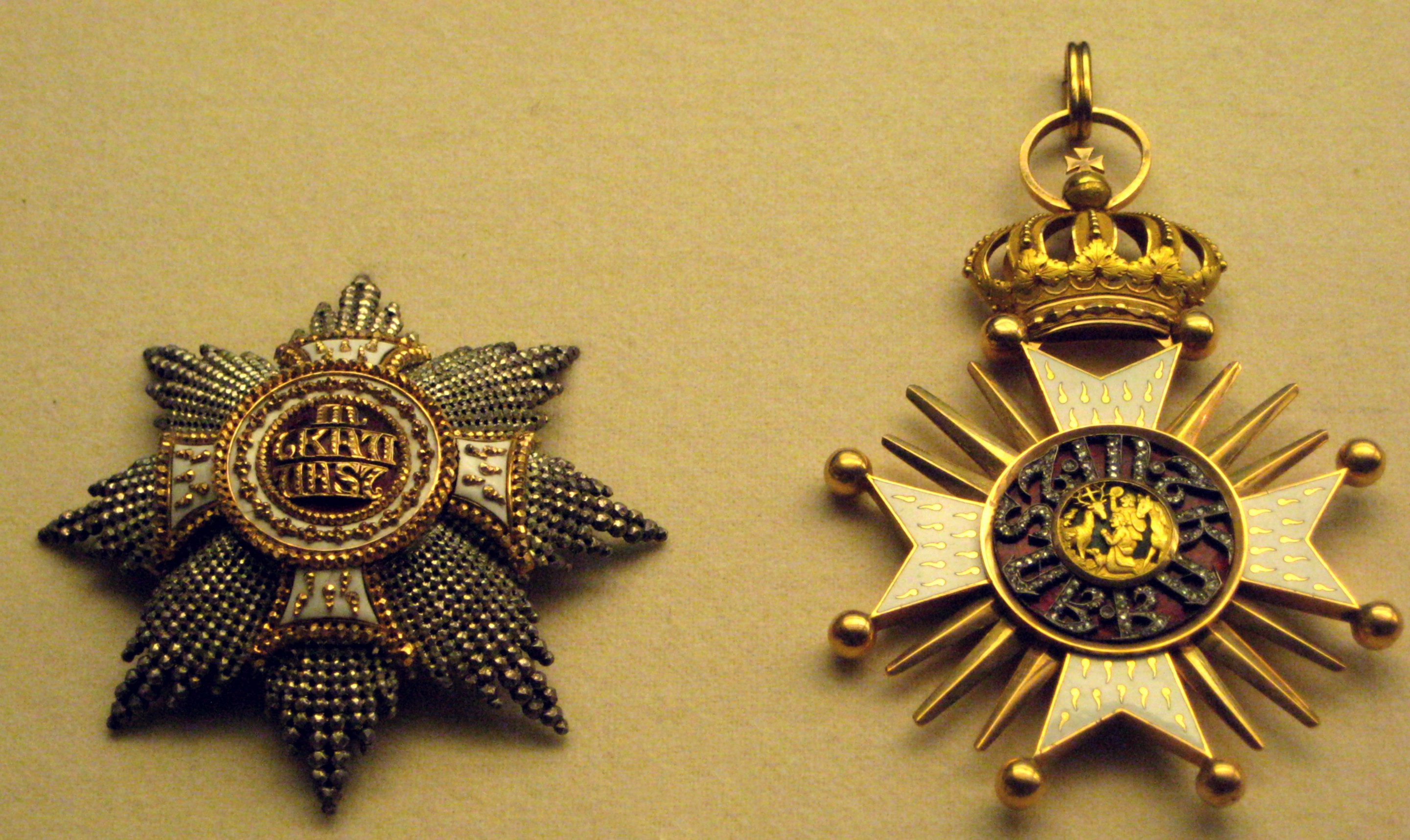
Two exemplars of the Order's medallion from the 19th century. The exemplar on the left is similar to the style produced in the 1840s; it is approximately 87 millimeters (3.4 in) in diameter, with silver balls on the tips of the star points. The center is enamel on gold. An exemplar such as this might be worth $8500 US (2010).

== Partial list of recipients ==
=== Recipients in Austrian Service ===
These recipients of the Order of Saint Hubert attained the rank of General in Austrian military service during the French Revolutionary and Napoleonic Wars.

- August Maria Raimund Prinz und Herzog von Arenberg, Graf von der Marck (1753–1833)
- Karl Joseph Franz, Graf u. Prinz von Auersperg ( –1800)
- Wilhelm Ignaz Cajetan, Prince von Auersperg (1749–1822)
- Heinrich, Count von Bellegarde (1756–1845)
- Anton (Antal), Fürst Esterházy de Galántha (1738–1794)
- Nikolaus II, Fürst Esterházy de Galántha (1765–1833)
- Karl Aloys zu Fürstenberg (1760–1799)
- George IV of the United Kingdom (1762–1830)
- Louis Aloysius, Prince of Hohenlohe-Waldenburg-Bartenstein (1765–1829)
- Friedrich Karl Wilhelm, Prince Hohenlohe-Ingelfingen (1752–1816)
- Karl Wilhelm Georg, Landgraf zu Hessen-Darmstadt (1757–1795)
- Friedrich (VI) Joseph Ludwig, Prince of Hessen-Homburg (1769–1829)
- Karl Emanuel, Landgraf zu Hessen-Rheinfels-Rothenburg (1746–1812)
- Archduke Charles, Duke of Teschen (1771–1847)
- Francis IV, Duke of Modena (1779–1846)
- Archduke John of Austria (1782–1859)
- Archduke Louis of Austria (1784–1864)
- Joseph Radetzky von Radetz (1766–1858)
- Heinrich XV. Fürst zu Reuss-Plauen (1751–1825)
- Karl Philipp Fürst zu Schwarzenberg (1771–1820)
- Franz de Paula Fürst von Sulkowski, Herzog von Bielitz (1733–1812)
- Alexander Suvorov (1729–1800)
- Maximilian Joseph Fürst von Thurn und Taxis (1769–1831)
- Christian August Prinz zu Waldeck und Pyrmont (1744–1798)
- George I, Prince of Waldeck and Pyrmont (1747–1813)

=== Diplomats ===
- Alexander Kurakin (1752–1818)

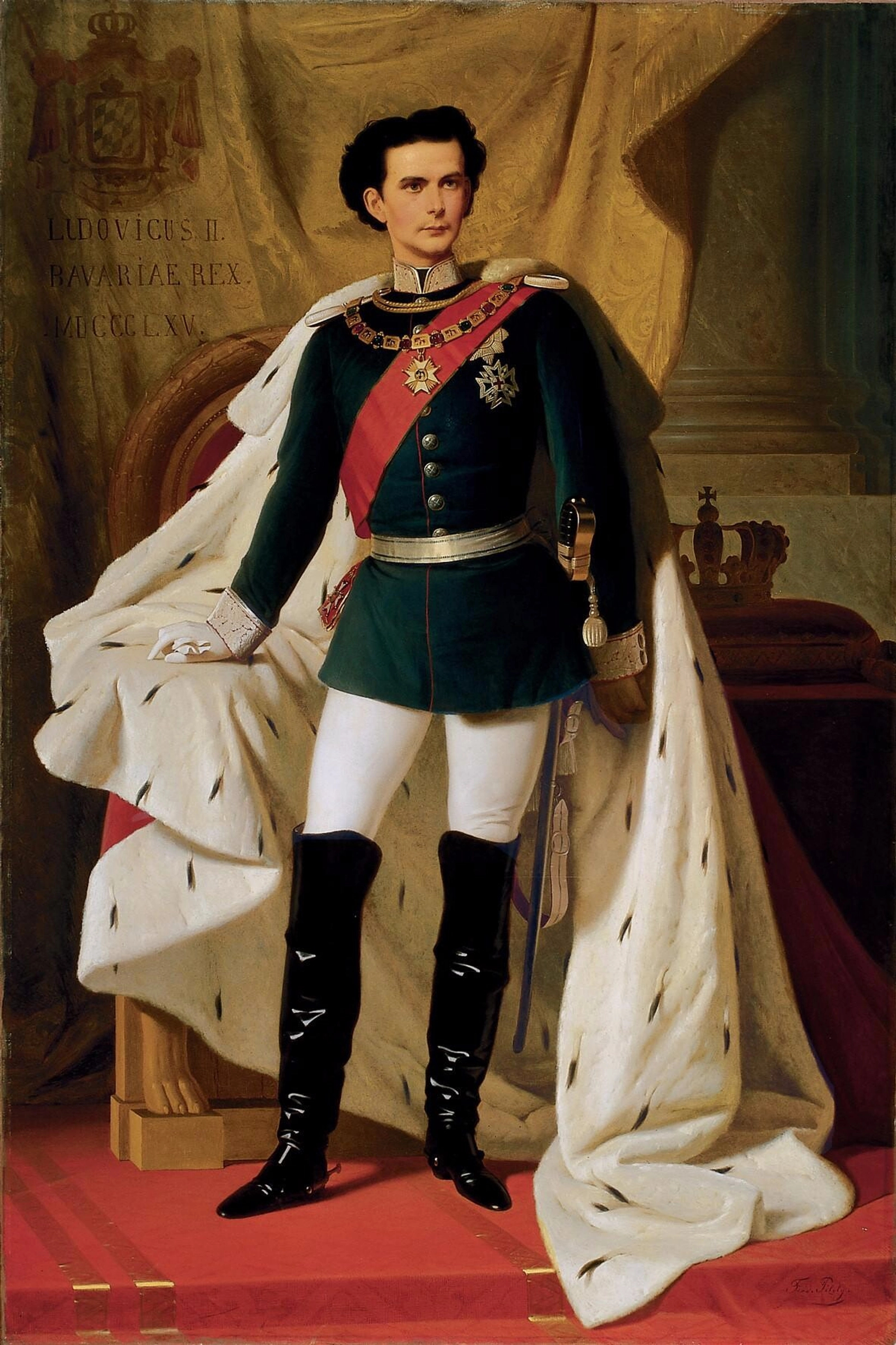
Ludwig II of Bavaria wearing sash and star of the order

=== French recipients ===
- Napoleon (1769–1821)
- Eugène de Beauharnais (1781–1824)
- Armand Augustin Louis de Caulaincourt (1773–1827)
- André Masséna (1758–1817)
- Nicolas Soult (1769–1851)
- Henri Jacques Guillaume Clarke (1765–1818)
- Georges Mouton (1770–1838)

=== Belgian Knights of Saint Hubert ===
- King Leopold II
- Prince Charles, Count of Flanders
- King Albert I, Wedding gift in 1900

=== Post Napoleonic Recipients ===
- Prince Franz Maria Luitpold of Bavaria (1875–1957).
- Prince Arthur of Connaught (1883–1938)
- Ernest Augustus, Duke of Brunswick (1887–1953)

== Grandmasters of the Order ==
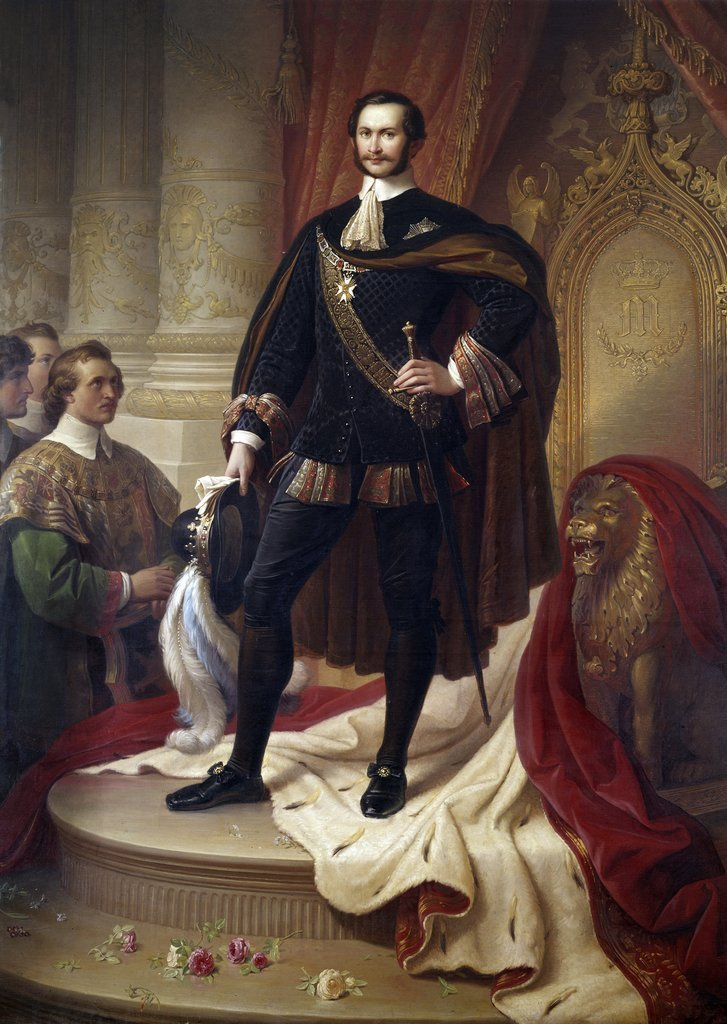
Maximillian II of Bavaria (1811–1864), wearing the neck chain and medallion of the Grand Master of the Order of Saint Hubert, and the full dress uniform of the Order.

Compiled from various sources.

- Gerhard VII, Duke of Jülich-Berg (1445-1475)
- William IV, Duke of Jülich-Berg (1475-1511)
- John III, Duke of Cleves (1511–1538)
- Wilhelm, Duke of Jülich-Cleves-Berg (1538–1592)
- John William, Duke of Jülich-Cleves-Berg (1592–1609)
- (Order unused until reinstated in 1708)
- Johann Wilhelm, Elector Palatine (1708–1716)
- Charles III Philip, Elector Palatine (1716–1742)
- Charles Theodore, Elector of Bavaria (1742–1799)
- Maximilian I Joseph of Bavaria (1799–1825)
- Ludwig I of Bavaria (1825–1848)
- Maximilian II of Bavaria (1848–1864)
- Ludwig II of Bavaria (1864–1886)
- Otto, King of Bavaria (1886–1916)
- Ludwig III of Bavaria (1916–1921)
- Rupprecht, Crown Prince of Bavaria (1921–1955)
- Albrecht, Duke of Bavaria (1955–1996)
- Franz, Duke of Bavaria (1996-present)

== Sources ==
=== Bibliography ===
- Beatson, Robert. A Political Index to the Histories ... London: Longman, Hurst, Rees, and Orme, 1806.
- Boulton, D'Arcy Jonathan Dacre. The Knights of the Crown : the monarchical orders of knighthood in later medieval Europe 1325–1520. Woodbridge: Boydell, 1987, ISBN 0-85115-417-4, p. 604.
- Burke, John Bernard. Book of Orders of Knighthood and Decorations of Honour of all Nations. London: Hurst and Blackett, 1858.
- Burke, John Bernard. Burke's Peerage. London: Burke's Peerage Ltd, 1914.
- Butler, Alban. The lives of the fathers, martyrs, and other principal saints. Dublin: James Duffy, 1866.
- Chisholm, Hugh. "Knighthood: Orders of Knighthood (Bavaria)." Encyclopædia Britannica. New York, The Encyclopædia Britannica Co., 1910–11. Volume 15.
- Coby, Patrick. Thomas Cromwell: Machiavellian statecraft and the English Reformation. Lanham: Lexington Books, 2009. ISBN 978-0-7391-3404-7.
- "Decorations and Awards: Bavaria.". Napoleon Series. Robert Burnham, Editor in Chief. Accessed 17 March 2010.
- Dyer, Thomas Henry . Modern Europe from the fall of Constantinople to the establishment of the German Empire, A.D. 1453–1871. London, G. Bell & Sons, 1877.
- Emedals Catalog. Bavarian House and Knightly Orders. See item GST757. Burlington Ontario, Canada. Accessed 17 March 2010.
- Guthrie, William, John Knox and James Ferguson. A new geographical, historical, and commercial grammar... London: Vernon & Hood [etc., etc.] 1801.
- Henderson, Ernest Flagg. A short history of Germany (volume 2). New York: Macmillan, 1917,
- Israel, Jonathan Irvine. Conflicts of Empires: Spain, the Low countries and the struggle for world supremacy, 1585–1713. London: Hambledon Press, 1997, ISBN 978-1-85285-161-3.
- Jensen, Nathan D. Georges Mouton Virtual Arc d Triumphe. 2005-2009 Accessed 17 March 2010.
- Martin, Frederick et al., "Bavaria." The Statesman's year-book. London [etc.] Palgrave [etc.], 1877.
- McIntosh, Christopher. The Swan King: Ludwig II of Bavaria. London: Tauris, 2000, ISBN 1-86064-892-4.
- Reichard, M. Itinerary of Germany, or A Traveller's Guide. London: Leigh, 1819.
- Rudge, F.M. "Military Orders of St. Hubert." The Catholic Encyclopedia. Vol. 7. New York: Robert Appleton Company, 1910. 20 January 2010.
- Sainty, Guy Stair (editor), and Rafal Heydel-Mankoo (deputy editor). World Orders of Knighthood & Merit. Burke's Peerage, 2006. ISBN 978-0-9711966-7-4.
- Smith, Digby, and Leopold Kudrna (compilers). A biographical dictionary of all Austrian Generals in the French Revolutionary and Napoleonic Wars, 1792–1815. The Napoleon Series, Robert Burnham, editor in chief. April 2008 version. Accessed 23 February 2010.
- Tagore, Sourindro Mohun. The orders of knighthood, British and foreign, with a brief review of the titles of rank and merit in ancient Hindusthan. Calcutta, 1884.
- Velde, François. Essay and Heradica. Heraldica. 12 March 2006. Accessed 16 February 2010.
- Wilhelm, Thomas. "Hubert, St. Order of." A military dictionary and gazetteer. Philadelphia: L.R. Hamersly & Co., 1881.
