= All-Japan Band Competition =

Symphonic band contest in Japan

All-Japan Band Competition (全日本吹奏楽コンクール, Zen Nihon Suisōgaku Konkūru) is a large symphonic band contest in Japan, organised by the All-Japan Band Association and the Asahi Shimbun. The contest is divided into four groups: junior high school, high school, college and the workplace. Each symphonic band plays 2 pieces, a set piece and an own-choice piece. There are three types of awards given: Gold, Silver, Bronze.

== Location ==
The All-Japan Band Competition often held the national finals (全国大会) of the junior high school and high school competitions in November in Fumon Hall owned by the Risshō Kōsei Kai. After the 2011 Japan earthquake, however, the ceilings of the Great Hall (大ホール) were determined to have high risk of collapse. The Great Hall was closed temporarily after May 13, 2012. Consequently, the venue for the 2012 national finals changed to the Nagoya Congress Center.

The location of the college and workplace final varies from year to year, with past venues including the Ehime Prefecture Cultural Hall and the Osaka International Convention Center.
