= Nuremberg–Ingolstadt high-speed railway =

Key Bavarian transport link

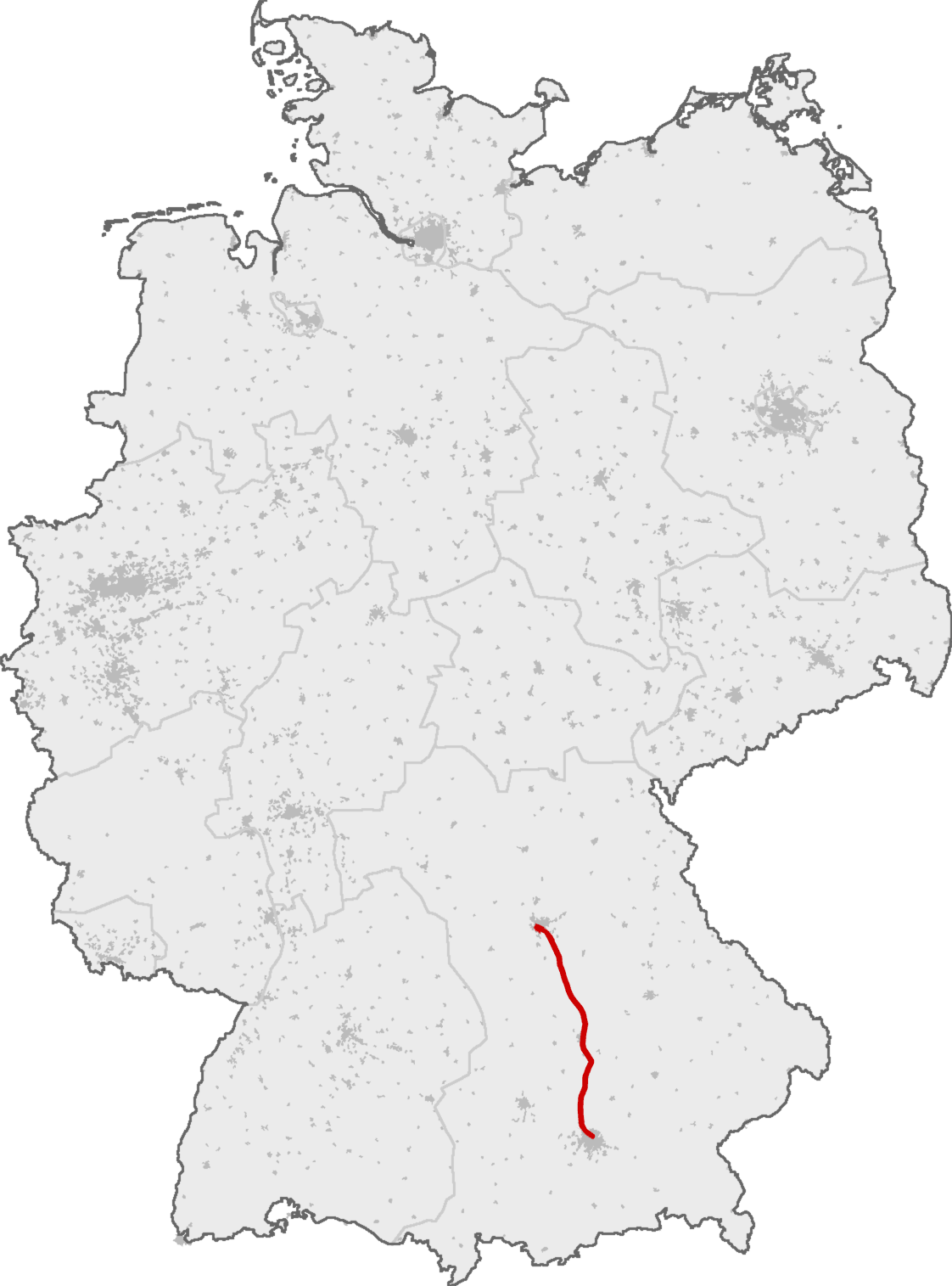

Overview
- Native name: Schnellfahrstrecke Nürnberg–Ingolstadt
- Owner: DB Netz
- Line number: 5934
- Locale: Bavaria, Germany

Service
- Route number: 900 (regional services); 900.1 (long-distance services)
- Operator: DB Fernverkehr

Technical
- Line length: 77.572 km (48.201 mi)
- Num of tracks: 2
- Track gauge: 1,435 mm (4 ft 8 1/2 in) standard gauge
- Minimum radius: 4,085 m (13,402 ft)
- Electrification: 15 kV/16.7 Hz AC overhead catenary
- Operating speed: 300 km/h (186 mph)
- Maximum incline: 2.0%

The Nuremberg–Ingolstadt high-speed railway is a 78-kilometre-long (48 mi) high-speed railway running between the cities of Nuremberg and Ingolstadt in Bavaria, Germany. It branches off the Nuremberg–Regensburg railway and runs parallel to the A9 Autobahn to Ingolstadt, where it joins the Munich–Treuchtlingen railway at Ingolstadt Nord station.

The line is an extension of the German Unity Transport Project No. 8 from Berlin via Halle/Leipzig and Erfurt to Nuremberg. The line is part of the Line 1 of Trans-European Transport Networks (TEN-T).

The line was officially inaugurated on 13 May 2006. Limited operation with a twice-hourly long-distance service started on 28 May 2006. The line has been in full operation since December 2006. Compared to the former track via Augsburg, it cut off 29 km (18 mi), or about 30 minutes journey time on long-distance and an hour on regional trains.

Project costs were estimated to amount to €3.7 billion (as of 2012). In 1998, before construction began, it was forecast to cost €2.3 billion.

The high-speed connection was controversial in particular because of its high cost, its ecological effects, but also for its route. Routes via Augsburg were also considered.

== Route ==
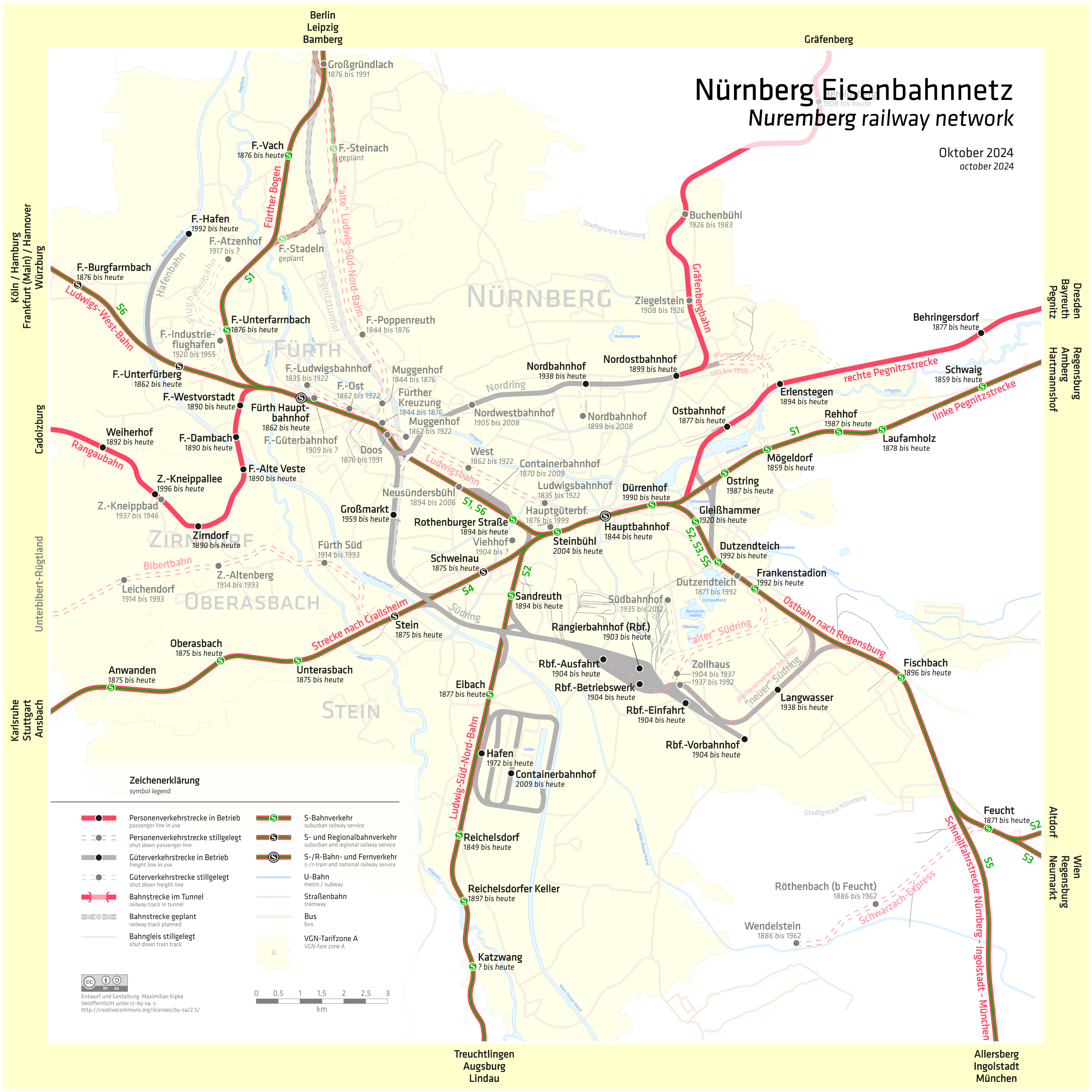
The line separates from the existing Nuremberg–Regensburg line near Feucht (bottom right).

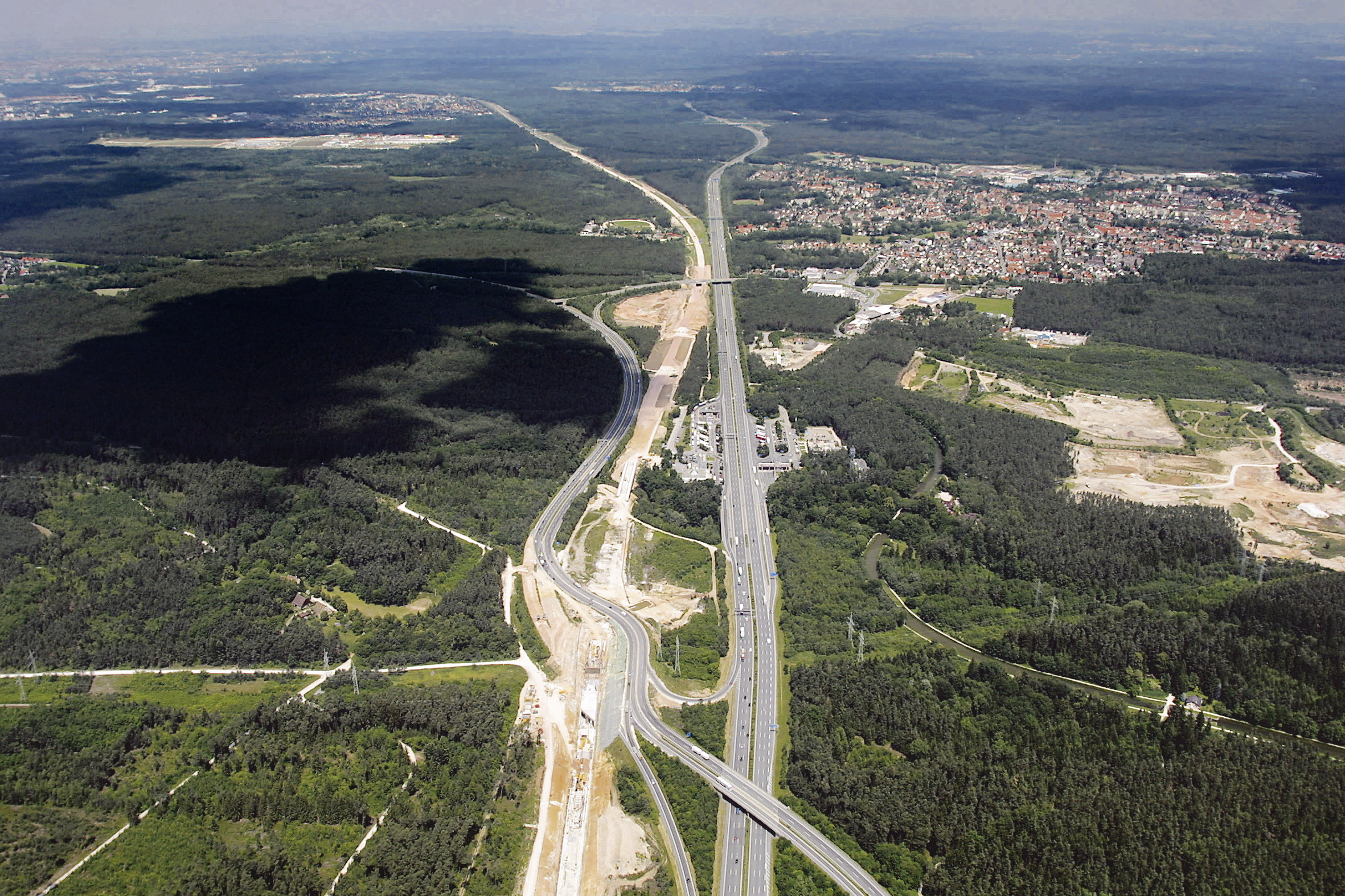
Coming from Nuremberg (above left), the new line swings to run between the A 73 (left) and the A 9 (right) near Feucht. This was taken during the earthworks (2001).

The 77.4 km-long new line was largely routed parallel to Autobahn 9 to cut through as little of the landscape as possible. This "bundling" meant that nine tunnels with a total length of 27 kilometres were required–almost a third of the new route. The 7.7 km long Euerwang tunnel and the 7.3 km long Irlahüll tunnel are among the longest tunnels in Germany. In addition, 82 rail and road bridges were built, including five major steel bridges, and about 80 culverts (with a diameter less than 2 m). At 305 metres, the longest road bridge on the new line spans the new line, the Schwarzach and the A 9 near Großhöbing.

The continuously welded track was built on a slab track (km 11.5–86.6) in 120 metre-long sections. The tracks are designed for a maximum speed of 300 km/h over a total length of 69.4 kilometres. This shortens the long-distance travel time between Nuremberg and Ingolstadt from 66 minutes to around half an hour. Two new regional stations were built at Allersberg (Rothsee) and Kinding (Altmühltal). While stopping trains approach platform tracks via sets of points, long-distance trains can run through the stations without reducing their speed.

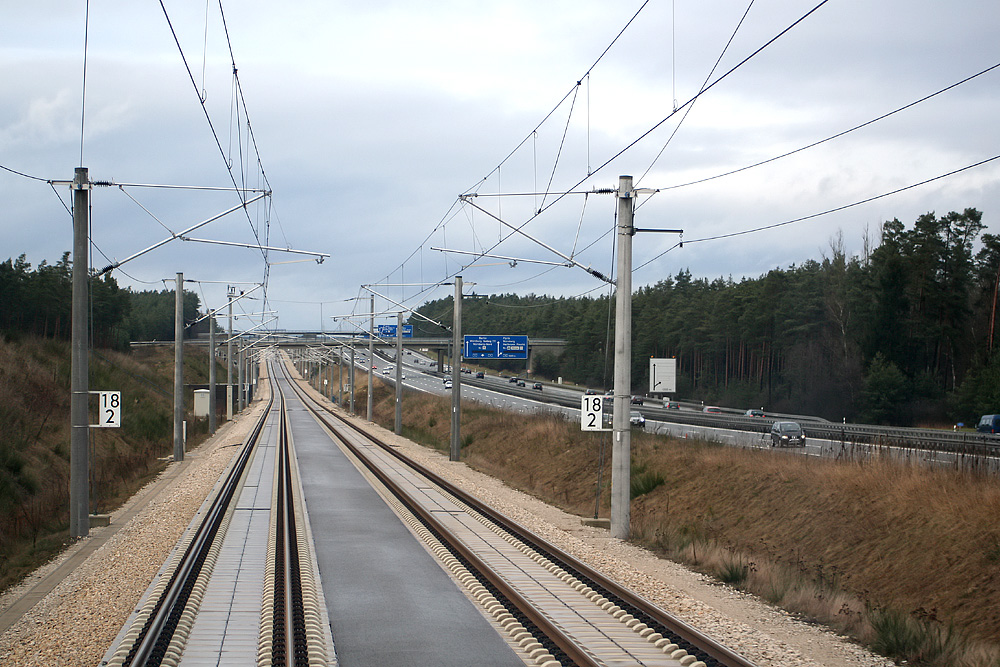
"Bundling" of high-speed railway and the A 9

Trains from Nuremberg to the new line run on the upgraded old Nuremberg-Regensburg railway to Nuremberg-Fischbach (9 kilometres). The route leaves Nuremberg Central Station in an easterly direction, crossing the railway line to Eger and running parallel to the S-Bahn lines 2 and 3 past the stadium to Nuremberg-Fischbach. At Reichswald junction, the Regensburg line is routed via high-speed points to a parallel track from the Nuremberg marshalling yard. The straight-ahead tracks connect to the new line to Ingolstadt.

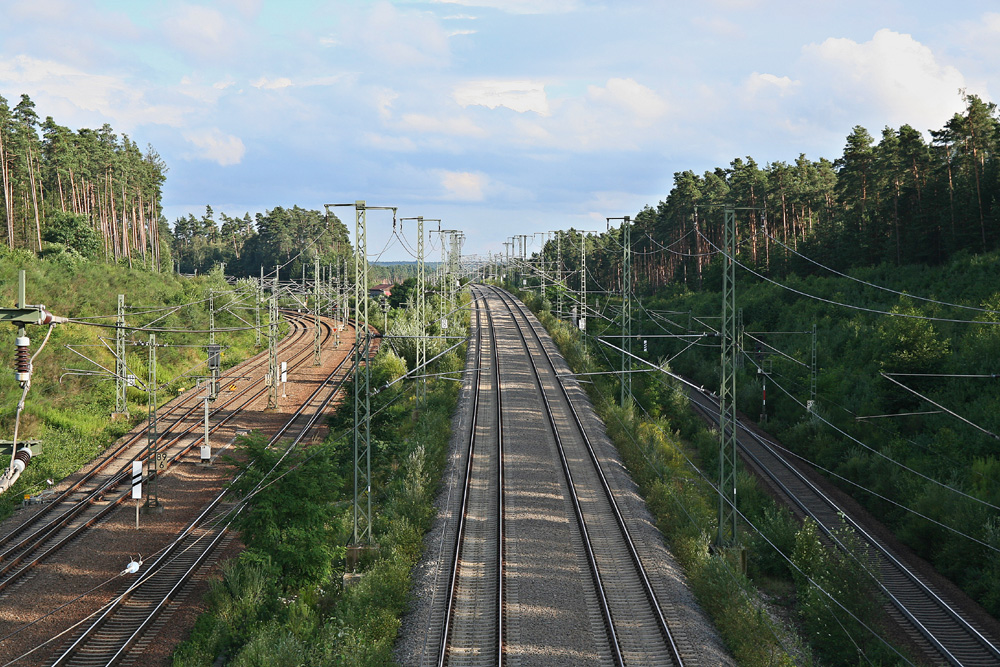
Route near the Reichswald junction. The two tracks in the middle lead to Ingolstadt, the tracks to the right and left of it to Regensburg. The two tracks on the left edge of the picture are used by the Nuremberg–Feucht–Altdorf S-Bahn.

The new line rises on the ramp to an overpass structure and crosses the line to Regensburg. While the lines towards Regensburg and Altdorf (S-Bahn) approach Feucht station on a left-hand curve, the high-speed line takes a slight right-hand curve through the municipality in a southerly direction. At km 13 it meets Autobahn 73 running west and Autobahn 9 running east. The line runs over the Schwarzach Viaduct over the Schwarzach and shortly afterwards through a trough structure under the Nuremberg/Feucht motorway triangle. While the A 73 ends here, the A 9 runs parallel to the line for around 35 kilometres.

The end of the Nuremberg Reichswald (forest) is followed by Allersberg station, Göggelsbuch tunnel, the bridge over the Main–Danube Canal and Offenbau tunnel. At kilometre 46/47 the railway stops running parallel with the autobahn, which moves away in an easterly direction towards Greding, while the line enters the 7.7 kilometre-long Euerwang tunnel towards the south-west. In a short interlude, the line runs aboveground through the Anlauter valley, the Schellenberg tunnel (650 metres) and the Altmühl valley with Kinding station. The autobahn runs further east in this short area.

In the subsequent Irlahüll tunnel (7,260 m), the line passes under the autobahn and then climbs by around 115 metres. In the subsequent Denkendorf tunnel, the gradient drops slightly for a short time before the line reaches its high point at kilometre 71 at around 500 metres above sea level. In this section, the autobahn lies to the west of the railway line and is crossed again in the subsequent Stammham Tunnel. The line detaches itself from the autobahn and dives a little later into Geisberg tunnel. Within sight of the Audi factory in Ingolstadt, the line briefly runs parallel to the Etting bypass to the west.

The high-speed section ends at kilometre 83.7, immediately before a curve that runs into the Audi tunnel via a ramp. The new section ends with the end of its southern ramp, which also includes the platforms of Ingolstadt Nord station on the high-speed line. Here, the tracks merge into the Munich–Treuchtlingen railway, which has been widened to include a third track between the two Ingolstadt stations. After crossing the Danube on Ingolstadt railway bridge, the line reaches Ingolstadt Hauptbahnhof (main station).

The new line runs largely through an area dominated by agriculture and forestry. Areas of particular ecological value are cut through in the Lorenzer Reichswald (forest) in Nuremberg, when crossing the Altmühl and Anlauter valleys, and in the Kösching forest near Ingolstadt. The gradient of the line increases from Nuremberg (330 m above sea level) to Ingolstadt (370 m above sea level), with a low point in the Altmühl valley (375 m above sea level, km 59) and high points at around km 35.5 (450 m above sea level) and 71 (500 m above sea level).

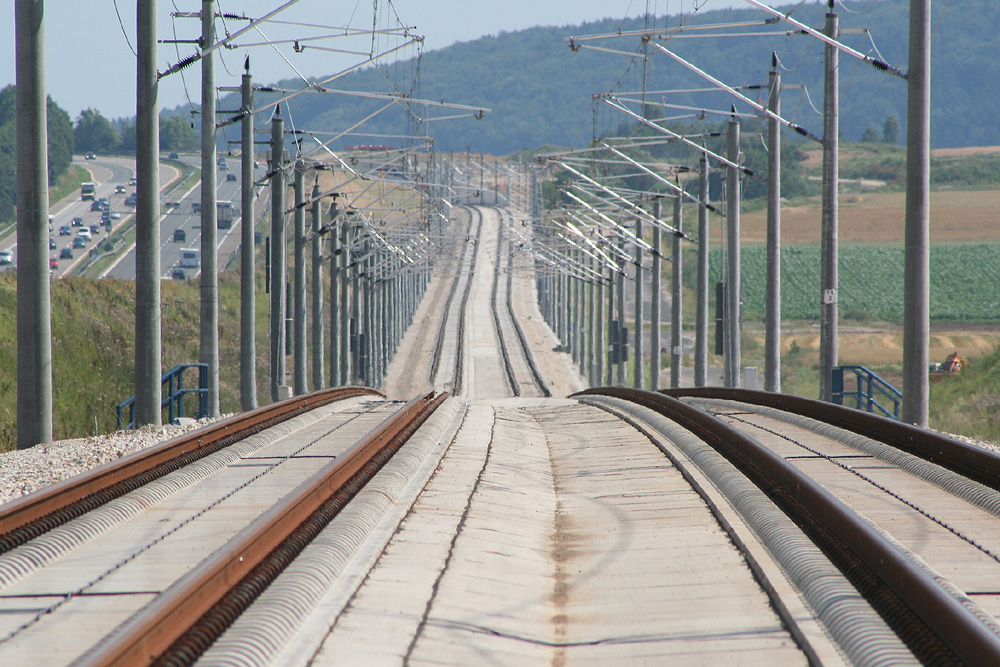
The line still under construction near the Hilpoltstein car park. The gradient, which reaches a maximum of 20 per thousand on the new line, is clearly visible.

In the new section, the track was built with a gradient of up to 2.0% with a cant of up to 160 millimetres and a cant deficiency (at 300 km/h) of 100 millimetres. A longitudinal gradient of 2.0% is achieved in nine sections from 600 to 1,815 metres in length (in Geisberg tunnel). The railway embankments reach heights of up to 16 metres. 55 percent of the new line is on curves, with a minimum curve radius of 4,085 meters. The crossover to the opposite track branching off at the stations can be operated at 130 km/h, those on the platform tracks at 100 km/h. The establishment of a crossover in Lohen (line kilometre 42) was planned, but was later realised only as a block post. The cross-section of the running tunnel is 92 square metres, the distance between the tracks is 4.50 metres.

The distance between centres of the line and the parallel autobahn between kilometres 13 and 48 is between 40 and 60 metres.

== History ==
=== Development of the Nuremberg–Munich line ===
The first continuous rail connection between Nuremberg and Munich was completed in 1849. The Nuremberg–Augsburg section ran over the central section of the Ludwig South-North Railway built between 1843 and 1849 via Gunzenhausen, Nördlingen and Donauwörth to Augsburg (170 kilometres). The Munich–Augsburg railway (62 kilometres) was completed by the Munich–Augsburg Railway Company in 1840.

The first route of over 232 kilometres between Nuremberg and Munich meant than the line was 82 kilometres longer than the straight-line distance of 149.6 kilometres between the two main stations. The line was determined by the costs, transport demand and political goals of the 19th century, with scarce capital and limited technical choices. For the steam locomotives, which were comparatively slow by modern standards, a route that adapted to the mostly hilly terrain with numerous curves was sufficient. As early as 14 May 1863, Ludwig Joseph Freiherr von Brück, Director General of the Royal Bavarian Transport Authorities (Generaldirektor der Königlich Bayerischen Verkehrsanstalten), emphasised in a memorandum to King Maximilian II the need for a direct connection between the two largest Bavarian cities as the "first and next need" and "the natural beginning of the entire railway system".

The Munich–Ingolstadt railway was opened in 1867 and extended to Treuchtlingen in 1870. Between 1870 and 1906 long-distance trains between Munich and Nuremberg used this line, with a total length of 198 kilometres. With the commissioning of the Donauwörth–Treuchtlingen railway, the line between Nuremberg and Augsburg was reduced to 137 kilometres in 1906, and between Nuremberg and Munich to 199 km. After this shortening, Augsburg was again served by north-south traffic.

=== Initial situation ===
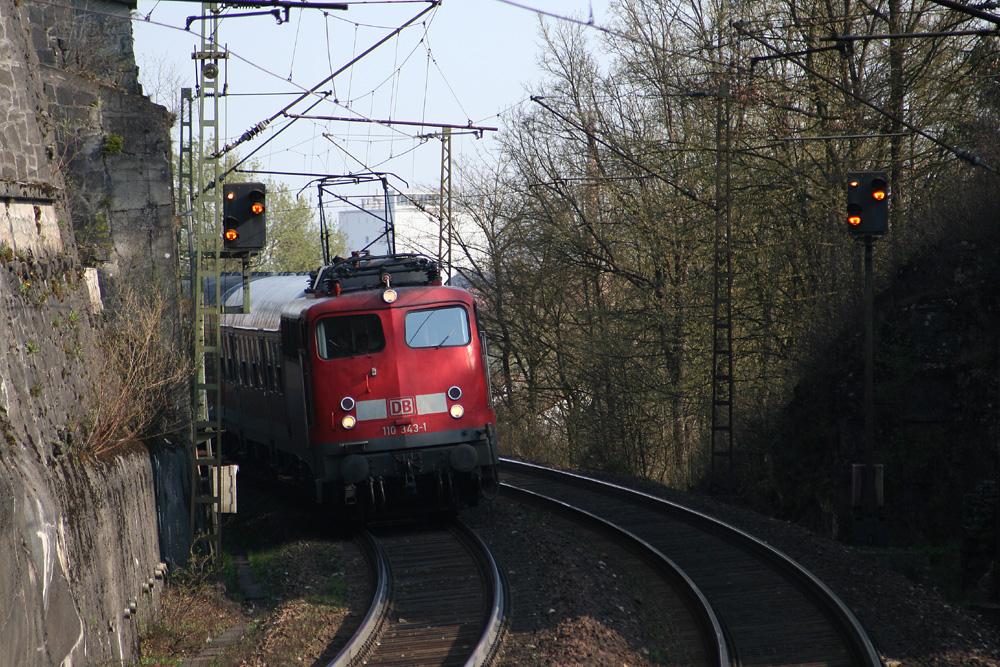
A class 110 locomotive runs through a tight curve in a deep cutting on the Donauwörth–Treuchtlingen line.

In the 1980s, the options for expanding the existing routes had been exhausted in many places: Intercity services reached 200 km/h on upgraded lines. The Augsburg-Oberhausen – Bäumeheim – (Donauwörth) (32.8 kilometres) and Munich-Lochhausen – Augsburg-Hochzoll (42.7 kilometres) sections had already been upgraded for this speed. At the end of May 1981, a total of 256.3 kilometres of track sections could be operated at 200 km/h. A further acceleration of train traffic on the lines, mostly laid out in the 19th century for lower speeds, was generally not possible without major rerouting. For example, numerous narrow curves on the track in the Donauwörth–Nuremberg section (96.3 kilometres) only allowed speeds of up to 160 km/h in places. In the 1980s, long-distance travel between Nuremberg and Munich was around one hour and 40 minutes.

With the new Hanover–Würzburg and Mannheim–Stuttgart lines, around 430 km of railways designed for operations at up to 250 km/h were under construction or in planning at the beginning of the 1980s, and the Intercity Experimental Intercity Express test train was at an advanced stage of development. Considerations at that time envisaged the construction of a 31.8 km-long long-distance railway replacement line for long-distance passenger and freight traffic in the Nuremberg area. In the most likely option, the route would have run from Nuremberg Hauptbahnhof in a south-easterly direction along federal highway 4 and Autobahn 9 via Nuremberg-Fischbach and Feucht to Roth, where it would have connected to the existing Nuremberg–Augsburg line. The change of direction in Nuremberg would have been abolished and the capacity that would have become free on the tracks between Roth and Nuremberg was to be used for the planned line 2 of the Nuremberg S-Bahn. A significant reduction in travel time was not expected, despite the fact that north-south long-distance trains would not have had to change direction at Nuremberg station over the approximately six km longer route.

==== First considerations ====
The first federal transport route plan from 1973 provided for an upgraded route between Würzburg and Augsburg via Nuremberg as one of eight development projects. This project was included in the 1977 Coordinated Investment Program (Koordinierten Investitionsprogramm) as well as in the 1980 Federal Transport Plan (Bundesverkehrswegeplan).

On 3 August 1983, the Nuremberg railway division of the then Deutsche Bundesbahn presented the DB headquarters with an initial proposal for a new rail link between Nuremberg and Munich. At the request of the DB in 1984, the project—with an open route, open investment costs and "subject to sufficient proof of economic viability taking into account the network effects"—was included in the 1985 Federal Transport Infrastructure Plan. The economic cost–benefit ratio for the project was 1.2. The exact alignment would still be examined. The main issues discussed were an upgrade of the existing line via Treuchtlingen/Augsburg with partial line improvements and the construction of a new line between Nuremberg and Ingolstadt with an upgrade of the line between Ingolstadt and Munich. In 1986 and 1987, a comparison of options was carried out by DB.

Option comparison
Option	Length (km)	Running time saving (approx, in min.)	Cost (approx, in DM billion)	Environmental sustainability
1	171	31	2.4	yes
2	207	8	1.7	yes
3	203	15	2.6	no
4	191	17	2.1	questionable
5	205	7	1.2	yes
6	174	24	2.5	no
7	180	21	2.6	no
8	180	19	2.5	no
Options 1, 4–8 with a stop in Ingolstadt; Options 2, 3 with stops in Augsburg and Munich-Pasing

In a report published in 1987, the Deutsche Bundesbahn examined eight options:

- option 1 (via Ingolstadt): new line between Nuremberg and Ingolstadt, 75 kilometres with a maximum speed of 250 km/h, 59 kilometres at 200 km/h, addition of an additional track to the line between Munich-Obermenzing and Petershausen, location of the new line parallel to the autobahn to the south of Stammham, where it merges with the existing Munich–Treuchtlingen line.
- option 2 (via Augsburg): from Nuremberg via Fischbach on existing tracks; from there with the so-called S-Bahn replacement route to Kornburg bundled with the Autobahn 6, then a bend to the south and a bundled course with the Rhein-Main-Danube Canal and the B2. After crossing the Rednitz valley, it merges with the existing Nuremberg line near Büchenbach–Treuchtlingen. Large-scale rerouting of the existing line was planned north of Georgensgmünd and north and south of Pleinfeld; minor extensions were planned for the Treuchtlingen–Donauwörth line; larger route shifts would take place at Otting and Mündling. For capacity reasons, a new section was to be built between Augsburg and Mering. Of a total of 207 kilometres, 140 kilometres were designed for 200 km/h.
- option 3: Like option 2, but with a new line between Roth and Donauwörth. This NBS would have exited the Fischbach–Roth S-Bahn replacement route north of Roth and would have bypassed Roth to the west. From Georgensgmünd, this route would have run east of the existing line to Pleinfeld parallel to a high-voltage line. Weißenburg and Treuchtlingen would have been bypassed to the west. South of Treuchtlingen, from Möhren to north of Wörnitzstein, the existing line would have been affected, then line improvements in the Wörnitz valley. Longer sections of the existing route would have been abandoned after line improvements had been made. 203 kilometres total length, of which around 65 kilometres cleared for 250 km/h and 94 kilometres for 200 km/h.
- option 4: Nuremberg–Roth as option 2. North of Georgensgmünd and north and south of Pleinfeld line rebuilding with large-scale departures from the existing line. New line from south of Weißenburg to the east. Confluence with the existing Munich–Treuchtlingen line southwest of Obereichstaett; extensive tunnelling of the new line. Upgrade of the line between Obereichstaett and Ingolstadt. Ingolstadt-Munich like option 1. Of the total of around 191 kilometres, 126 kilometres should be designed for at least 200 km/h.
- option 5: Nuremberg–Treuchtlingen as for variant 2, then: Treuchtlingen–Ingolstadt acceleration and further retention of the existing route. Extensive conversion between Obereichstaett and Ingolstadt. Ingolstadt–Munich like variant 1. Of a total of 205 kilometers, 104 kilometers would have been designed for 200 km/h.
- option 6: Nuremberg – Postbauer-Heng – Ingolstadt – Munich. In order to keep the section of the new line as short as possible, the existing line between Nuremberg and Postbauer-Heng was to be used and partially upgraded. The new line would start at Postbauer-Heng and run through the Sulz valley through an open area towards the Altmühl valley. To the east of Kinding, the line would have crossed the Altmühl valley and the section running parallel with the autobahn would have been reached at Buch. From here the route would have been as in option 1. 59 kilometres of the total 174 kilometres of the route would have been designed for 250 km/h and 59 kilometres for 200 km/h. This option was affected by numerous constraints (particularly buildings).
- option 7: Nuremberg – Neumarkt – Ingolstadt – Munich. As with option 6, the Nuremberg–Regensburg line would have been used as far as Neumarkt. The new line should initially run along the existing Neumarkt–Dietfurt railway. The new line was to run through the Sulz valley, touching on Mühlhausen and Berching. North of Beilngries, the new line would have turned west to leave the Sulz valley. The Altmühl valley would have been crossed east of Kinding (as in option 6) to then run parallel with the autobahn. The rest of the route would have been like option 1. 57 kilometres of the 180 kilometres would have been designed for 250 km/h and 59 kilometres for 200 km/h.
- option 8 (Nuremberg – Sengenthal – Ingolstadt – Munich) would have run like option 6, but via Neumarkt to Sengenthal. South of Sengenthal, the line was to run east of the Sulz valley to the south through open ground. North of Beilngries the line would have run to the west. Further on, the line would have run like option 7 and would finally run parallel with the autobahn as in option 1. Of 180 kilometres, 51 kilometres would have been designed for 250 km/h and 59 kilometres for 200 km/h.

Options 3 to 8 were discarded in 1987. Options 1 and 2 were ultimately selected for more in-depth investigations.

Considerations for upgrading the route from Würzburg via Ansbach and Treuchtlingen to Augsburg had already been discarded in 1983 to avoid bypassing the Nuremberg metropolitan area as a transport and economic centre. The planned new line, on the other hand, was intended to improve the connection between the greater Nuremberg area and north-south traffic.

==== Route dispute ====
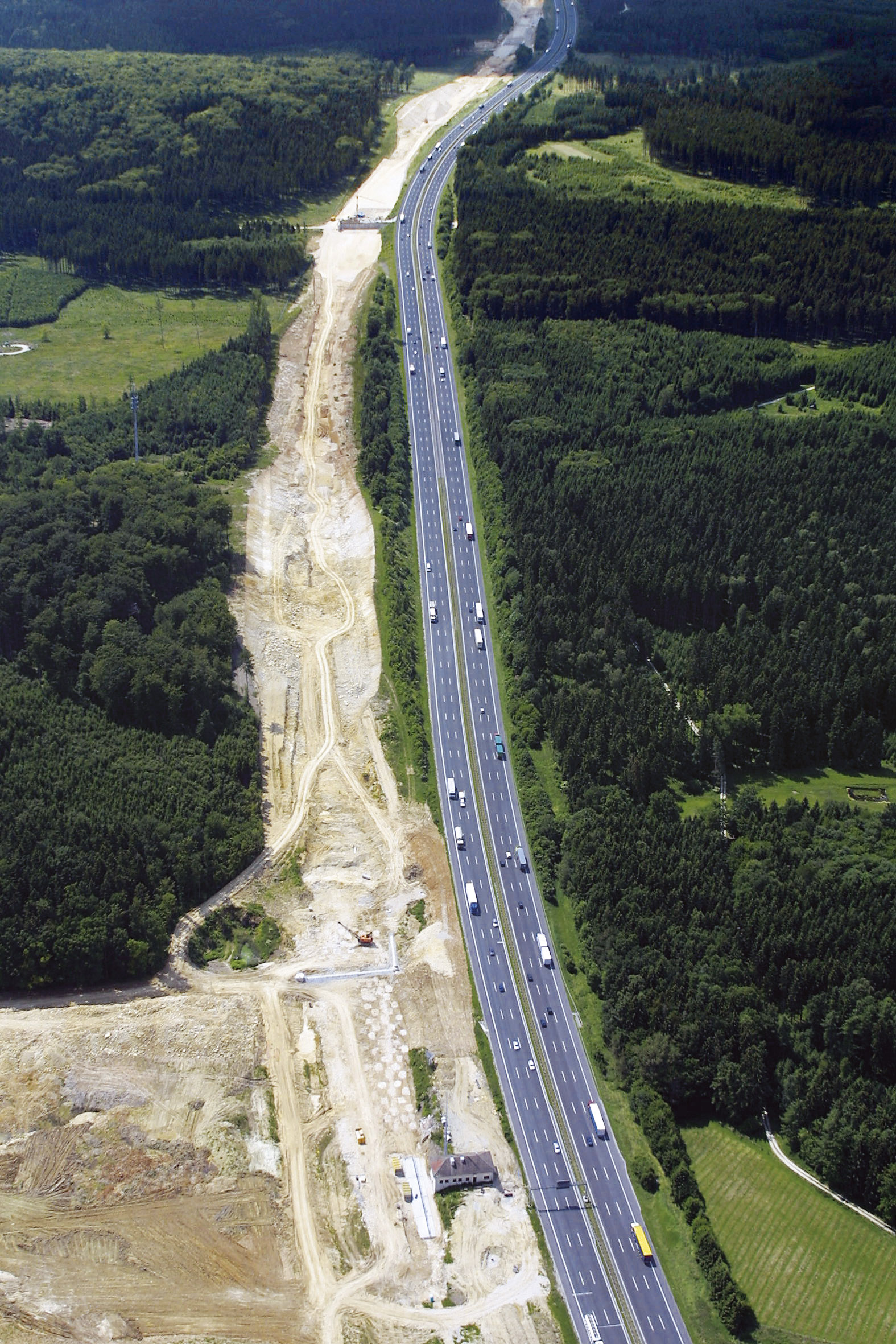
Controversial interventions in the landscape and ecosystem – new line under construction with A 9 in the Köschinger Forst (2001)

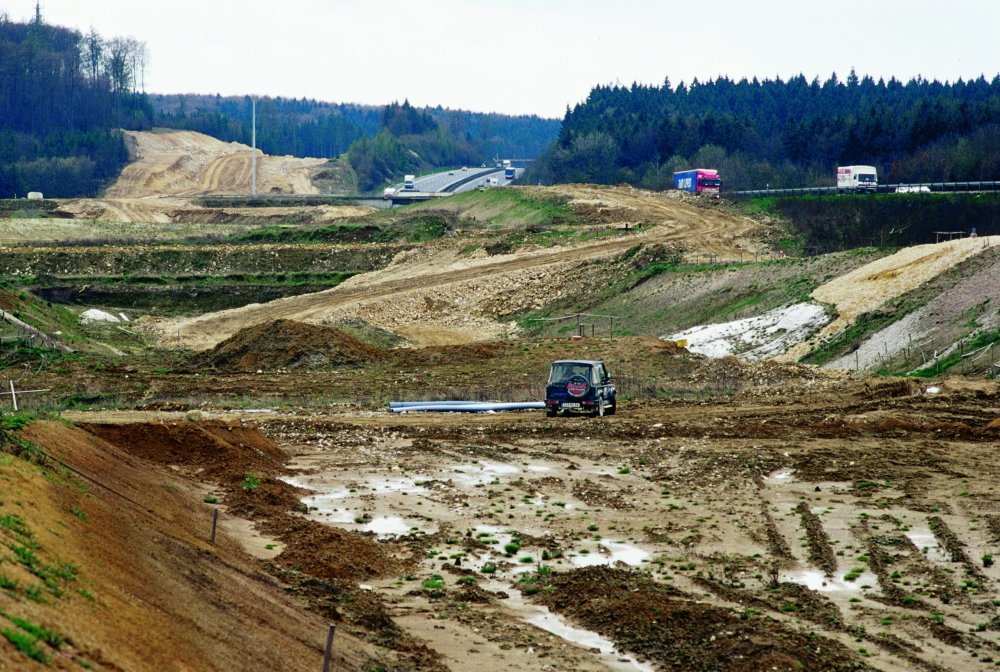
Large-scale construction work in the Köschinger forest (2001)

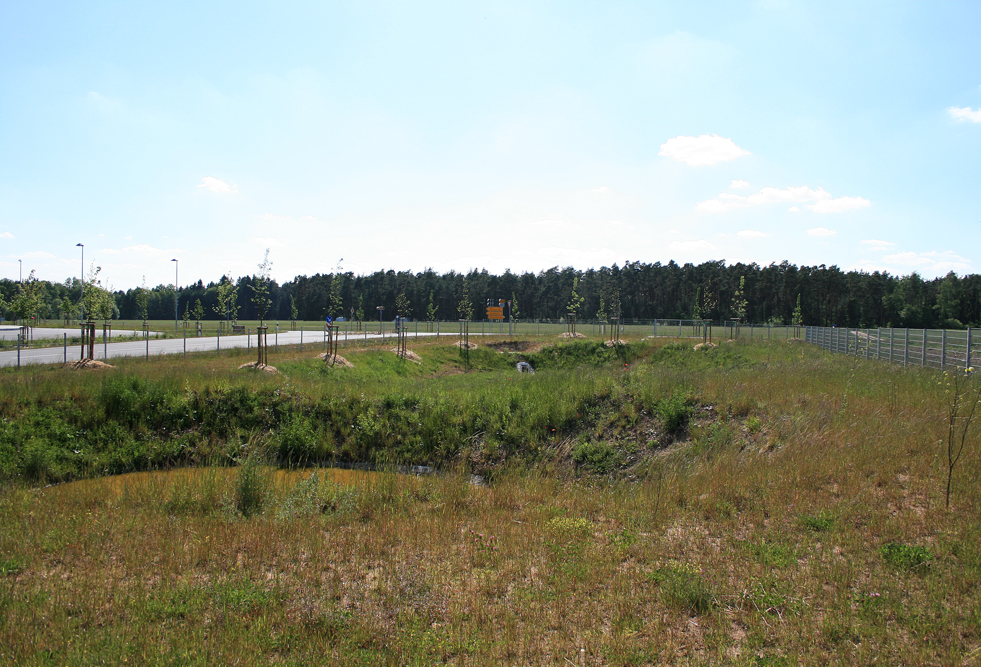
New ecological compensation area at Allersberg station

Key data of the preliminary planning (Deutsche Bundesbahn estimates of 29 June 1987)
	Ingolstadt option	Augsburg option
Distance	171 km	207 km
Cost	DM 2.4 billion	DM 1.7 billion
Travel time saving Munich–Nuremberg	31 min	8 min

Key data after the investigation (DB board of 31 May 1991)
	Ingolstadt option	Augsburg option (without tilting technology)
Distance	171 km	210 km
Max speed	250 km/h	200 km/h
Max grade	2.0%	1.25%
Travel time saving	31 min	7 min (with a stop in Pasing)
Cost	DM 3,010 billion	DM 2,637 billion

While the need for a faster connection was generally undisputed, the planned route in particular, as well its effects on the ecosystem and landscape, caused intensive discussions. The proposed new and upgraded line met with broad approval from numerous social groups, especially in the Nuremberg area, but also in other parts of Bavaria. The new line in the administrative district of Swabia was clearly rejected, in particular by the city of Augsburg and its chamber of commerce, as well as by the Bund Naturschutz in Bayern ("Federation of Nature Conservation of Bavaria") and the citizens' initiative Das bessere Bahnkonzept ("The Better Railway Concept"). They favoured an upgrade of the existing route via Augsburg, later also using tilting technology.

After inclusion in the Federal Transport Plan, eight options were examined, between the upgrade of the Nuremberg–Donauwörth–Augsburg–Munich line in the west and the new and upgraded Nuremberg–Sengenthal–Ingolstadt–Munich line in the east.

Two options were examined in depth: on the one hand, a new Nuremberg–Ingolstadt line for 250 km/h with an upgrade of the Ingolstadt–Munich line, without realising the planned long-distance railway replacement line. The second variant provided for an upgrade of the existing line between Roth and Treuchtlingen and between Treuchtlingen and Donauwörth for 200 km/h. In this solution, Augsburg was to be bypassed to the south, the Mering–Olching line was to be supplemented by two tracks and a long-distance railway replacement line was to be built in the Nuremberg area. Depending on the option, the Augsburg route would have been between 27 and 39 km longer than the Ingolstadt route. The results were presented to the Bavarian government on 29 June 1987. The government forwarded the report to its subordinate authorities, chambers of industry and commerce and the Bund Naturschutz for comments. On 2 and 3 May 1988, the Bavarian Ministry of Economics and Transport organised a discussion between these groups and Deutsche Bundesbahn.

In a decision of 19 July 1988, the Bavarian government gave preference to the route via Ingolstadt. Due to imponderables in the field of nature conservation, Deutsche Bundesbahn were asked to draw up spatial planning documents for both major options. The required documents were prepared by Deutsche Bundesbahn and handed over to the Bavarian State Ministry for Regional Development and Environmental Issues on 25 July 1989 to clarify the spatial planning issues, spatial planning permission was applied for and the spatial planning procedure was initiated. Six options were examined in the Nuremberg–Ingolstadt corridor, including a route to the west of the realised variant, via Pfahldorf, with a connection to the Munich–Treuchtlingen railway line near Gaimersheim. The documents were made public in September 1989 in the affected communities.

German reunification fundamentally changed the planning parameters. According to a letter from Deutsche Bundesbahn Board Member Heinz Dürr to Minister of State Peter Gauweiler dated 29 May 1991, the new route option had become unavoidable due to the changed traffic flows and forecasts after reunification. He cited the necessary increase in capacity due to the new line and the increased importance of reducing travel times between Nuremberg and Munich as reasons. If the Augsburg variant were to be implemented, according to Dürr, four-tracking of the line between Roth and Treuchtlingen would have been necessary. In the same letter, the CEO requested that the planning process be shortened to separate the projects for the new and upgraded Nuremberg–Ingolstadt–Munich line and the Mering bypass and four-tracking in the Augsburg area. The four-tracking of the line between Augsburg and Nuremberg was not to be pursued further, the four-tracking of the Augsburg-Munich line had become necessary for both options.

In 1990, the decision was made to build a single or double-track line for line 3 of the Nuremberg S-Bahn. The long-distance railway replacement route would only have to be built if the upgrade option was implemented.

The procedure ended on 19 June 1991 with a state planning assessment in which the current route of the new line was identified as the most balanced solution. The authority issued conditions, particularly in the area of landscape and nature conservation, the long-distance stop in Ingolstadt and the stations in Allersberg and Kinding, which were upgraded from overtaking to regional stations. The original planning (1991) envisaged a new line with a ballasted superstructure, with a maximum speed of 250 km/h and an extensive expansion of the Munich-Ingolstadt line for 200 km/h, with a section about ten kilometers long for 160 km/h.

The new and upgraded Nuremberg–Ingolstadt–Munich route was listed as a priority in the 1992 Federal Transport Plan, with a planned total investment of DM 3,000 million (€1,534 million at 1 January 1991 prices). The traffic forecast for the Federal Transport Routes Plan 1992 provided for 44 long-distance passenger and 38 freight trains per day and direction in 2010 on the new line. In mid-1994, Deutsche Bahn calculated—now taking into account the segregation of fast and slow traffic—with 42 long-distance passenger trains and 20 freight trains. The route—via Ingolstadt—was included in the Federal Railways Expansion Act (BSchwAG) of 15 November 1993 in the version of 27 December 1993.

According to a report by Vieregg-Rössler of July 1994, the journey time would have been 74 minutes if the route via Augsburg had been upgraded and active tilting technology had been used, and 69 minutes if the new line had been built between Donauwörth and Pleinfeld (2.8% grade). Deutsche Bundesbahn repeatedly emphasized that the costs of such a solution would be underestimated, but the benefits would be overestimated. Furthermore, with the necessary construction during ongoing operations, long-term deterioration in operational quality was to be expected. The capacity of an upgrade only option was also not sufficient, the route length via Augsburg was at least 28 kilometres longer. The Federal Court of Auditors stated in the same year that Deutsche Bundesbahn had calculated the Ingolstadt option too cheaply, but had artificially made the Augsburg option more expensive. The authorities calculated DM 3.89 billion (€1.99 billion) for the Ingolstadt option and DM 2.2 billion (€1.1 billion) for the Augsburg option.

=== Construction of the high-speed line ===
The design planning began after the conclusion of the spatial planning process on 19 May 1991. On 29 May 1992, the first planning approval process was initiated on the basis of the documents created by the Main Department for New Lines of the Federal Railway Directorate in Nuremberg. In July 1992, the plans were publicly displayed in the affected communities. In early 1992, the start of construction (in the Nuremberg/Feucht area) was planned for January/February 1993. After a total construction time of five to seven years, the line was to be put into operation at the end of 1998/beginning of 1999.

In mid-1994, the planning approval process for the new line was expected to be completed by 1995, while the process for the upgraded line was expected to be completed by 1996. The planning approval decisions for the new line were issued between 7 April 1994 (Fischbach–Feucht) and 26 February 1999 (introduction to Ingolstadt). The new line was divided into 14 planning approval sections and two for the long-distance traction power lines. Up to 300 objections were raised by citizens in the individual procedures for the planning approval sections. Of a total of around 40 lawsuits and summary proceedings against the administrative acts, none led to success.

The Bund Naturschutz in Bayern (BN) repeatedly opposed the line as a whole, in particular with reference to the upgrade option via Augsburg and the ecological impact of the new line. The environmental association stated, among other things, that the line was not objectively necessary for the public good. Among other things, the Bavarian Administrative Court dismissed complaints brought by the BN in a joint judgment and order dated 29 March 1996 and 10 January 1997. Constitutional complaints from BN were finally determined on 8 June 1998 by the Federal Constitutional Court when they were not admitted for trial and a related motion for an injunction was dismissed.

In the course of planning, the ETCS train protection system, the installation of a ballastless track and an increase in the top speed from 250 km/h to 300 km/h were adopted. Allersberg and Kinding stations were also upgraded from overtaking loops to regional stations and regional transport services were adopted.

In view of the expected geological problems in the karstified Franconian Jura, a multi-stage karst exploration program was carried out as part of the planning. The mountains were divided into four stages with regard to their karstification and examined by a so-called Karst working group of planners, experts and consultants from the Bavarian Geological State Office and the University of Erlangen–Nuremberg. Various direct and indirect methods were used. Aerial and satellite images as well as investigations during the construction of the Autobahn (1930s) were evaluated. The mountains to be driven through were tested by, among other things, core drilling (mean distance: 500 metres, other source: 170 metres) extensively around the planned route and a directional borehole radar (range: around 20 to 30 metres around the boreholes), a 557 metres long exploratory tunnel was also driven into the mountain at the Irlahüll tunnel. The selective explorations showed a heterogeneous karst formation. A complete karst mapping was not carried out due to the mostly high overburden, with a necessary distance between boreholes of 20 to 30 metres. During the drive, anomalies were documented and explored with grid drilling. Depending on the degree of karstification, various measures were then taken, such as injection drilling up to 15 metres around the tube, cavity filling and piling; the inner shell was reinforced in places and the tunnel floor was structurally modified. According to DB information, karstification of this magnitude was not expected.

A total of 746 pieces of land were purchased. The developed area was around 446 hectares, while the ecological compensation areas were 294 hectares. Seven buildings were demolished for the line (as of 1992). Around 7.5 million cubic metres of excavated material were stored at 16 landfills.

The new line was divided into seven construction lots. The Fischbach/Feucht interconnecting lot was awarded to six companies in 1997. The three major construction lots, north, middle and south, were let to general contractors on 3 September 1998 (according to another source: 1 October 1998) for a total of €710 million (DM 1.4 billion) at a fixed price. The north construction lot went to a bidding consortium of the Bilfinger and Berger (Munich) and Bögl (Neumarkt) companies, the middle construction lot to Hochtief (Munich) and the southern lot to a medium-sized bidding consortium led by Berger Bau (Passau) and Reiners Bau (Munich). Medium-sized companies accounted for DM 920 million, around 65 percent of the contracted work by value. A construction period of 53 months was planned for the new line to be completed, including around 15 months for the technical equipment. Commissioning was planned for the 2003 summer timetable. According to DB information, the short construction period forced construction to start quickly, which would have adversely affected preparation for the work. There was no time for cost optimisation, synergy effects would hardly have been achieved due to the many necessarily parallel work. This led to a shortage of experienced permanent staff at the construction companies.

Three separate, smaller construction lots covered the connecting areas in Nuremberg (Reichswald junction) and Ingolstadt (Audi tunnel lots and Ingolstadt node). Completion was expected in 1998 in 2003. The equipment for rail power supply, signalling technology and telecommunications was awarded as a separate lot for DM 120 million in January 1999 (according to another source: December 1998). During the construction phase there were 157 plan change procedures (as of October 2005).

To speed up and simplify the planning process, a uniform EDP system was used by all those involved, which used electronic signatures, among other things.

In July 2003, the contract for the line's safety technology was awarded to Siemens.

Planungsgesellschaft Bahnbau Deutsche Einheit ("German Unity Railway Construction Planning Company") was commissioned with the project management of the new and upgraded line in 1996, effective January 1997, and set up a project centre in Nuremberg for this purpose. DB ProjektBau later took over this function.

==== Construction ====
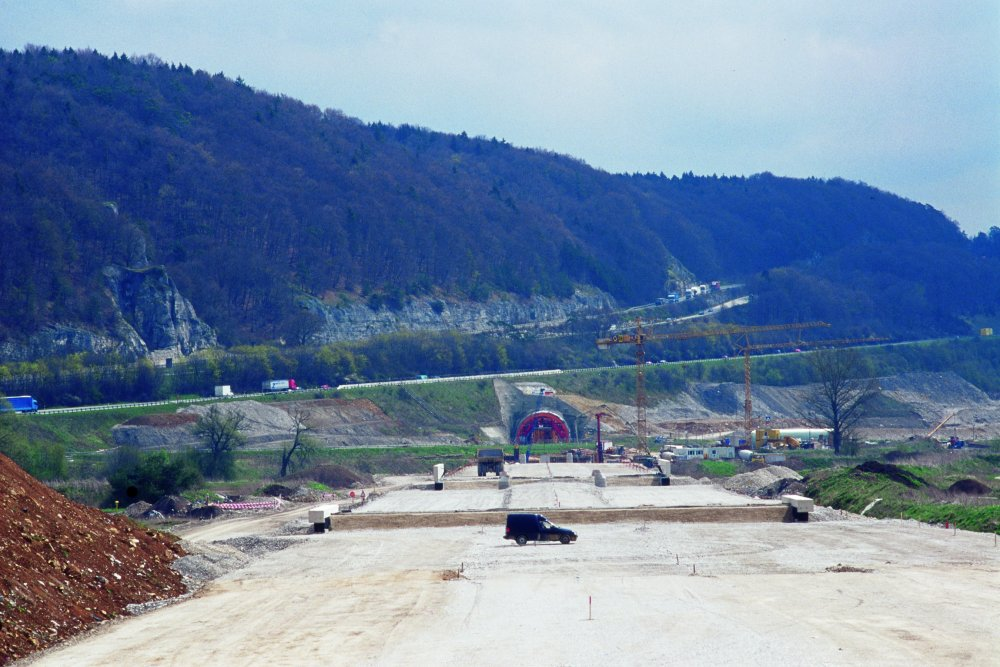
Controversial crossing of the Altmühl valley: construction site of the Kinding station in 2001.

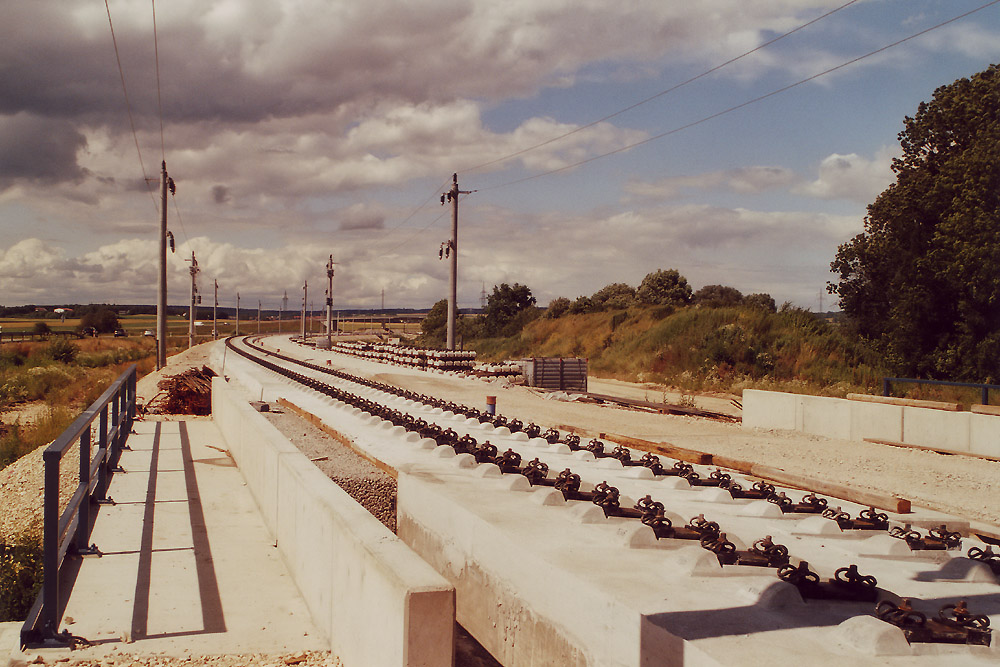
Construction site of the new line in Los Süd near Ingolstadt (2004)

On 15 July 1994, the ground-breaking ceremony for the extension of the railway bridge over Breslauer Straße took place in the Altenfurt district of Nuremberg. Bavarian Minister-president Edmund Stoiber, State Secretary in the Federal Ministry of Transport Wilhelm Knittel and Deutsche Bahn chairman Heinz Dürr symbolically pressed a button. Planning and financing of the entire line had not yet been completed at this time.

The access route in Nuremberg was rebuilt over a length of five kilometres and the Reichswald junction was built from 1997 to 1999. Large-scale construction work in the new section began after the contract was placed at the end of 1998, and by March 1999 clearing work and archaeological preliminary investigations were largely completed. When the large-scale construction work started, it was assumed that the construction work would end in February 2003. At the beginning of 2001, it was clear that the planned completion date of the end of 2003 would be delayed by a year or two.

With the start of work on the Göggelsbuch tunnel on 18 May 1999, the excavation of the nine tunnels began, which was completed in May 2001. Numerous problems arose during the construction of the tunnels, which required extensive design changes and had a significant impact on construction time and costs. Due to unexpected hydrological problems, Offenbau tunnel had to be built using a compressed air process. Large parts of Euerwang Tunnel also had to be made water tight. Denkendorf Tunnel was built after massive landslides tripled its length and was built in groundwater. Karst formations in the area of the Altmühlalb were particularly noteworthy, which could not be bypassed on a large scale due to the width to build the line parallel with the autobahn. In the Irlahüll, Geisberg and Stammham tunnels, karst caves had to be backfilled. By the autumn of 2004, the shells of all tunnels were completed.

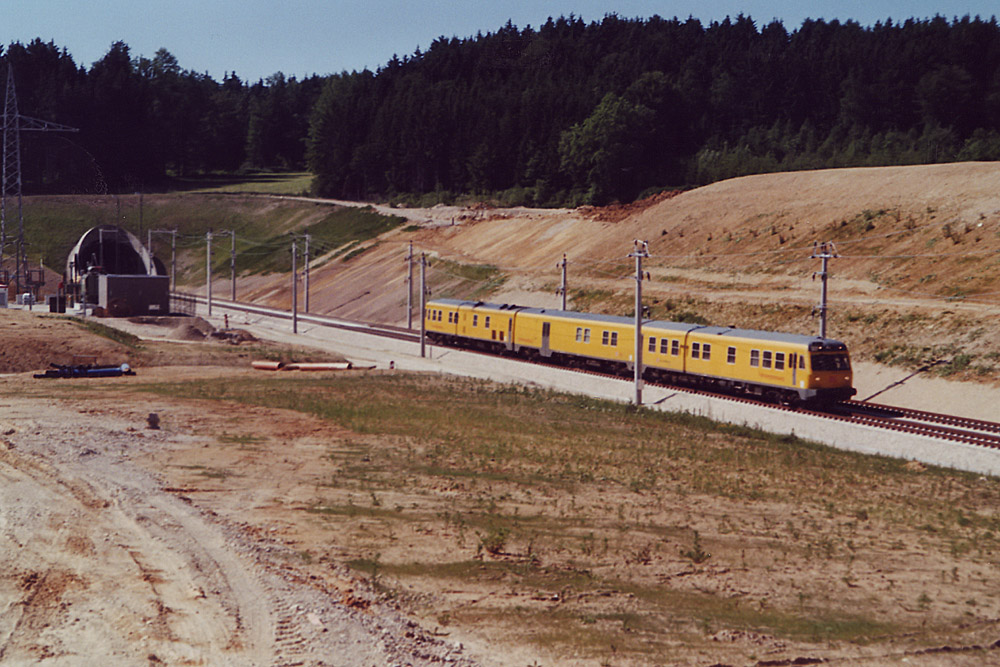
One of the first measurement runs to check the rails with ultrasound

The slab track was installed between April 2004 and April 2005; installation of rail track was completed in May and overhead line and signalling technology in November 2005. The first low-speed test and measurement runs were carried out between the end of May and October. The RAILab track geometry car was used, among other things, to check the track position, examine rails for material defects using ultrasound and measure the tunnel walls. On 13 September 2005, an ICE (ICE TD) ran over the line at low speed for the first time.

Up to 1800 people were simultaneously employed on the construction sites along the line.

The preparation and execution of the commissioning were controlled by the PXN working group set up by the DB board of directors in August 2000 and headed by DB Personenverkehr.

==== Commissioning ====
The line's "gap closure" ceremony took place in Kinding station on 13 May 2005. An 11 metre-long piece of rail was cut out in the north-eastern area of the station that morning and brought into the adjacent Schellenberg tunnel by excavator. In the afternoon, in the presence of several hundred guests, it was ceremoniously welded back into place.

On 25 November 2005 at 10 a.m., the overhead line was energised for the first time. The electronic interlockings in Nuremberg-Fischbach went into operation on 28 November. At the end of November, the first continuous journeys were made with an ICE TD and 218 and ER20 class locomotives. High-speed test runs began on 1 December 2005. From 6 to 12 December 2005, the LZB carried out acceptance runs. Top speeds of over 330 km/h were reached during the test and acceptance runs. In addition to the ICE S, which at times was running with one or seven intermediate cars, the locomotives 103 235 with a sound measurement train and 120 502 with the RAILab from DB Systemtechnik.

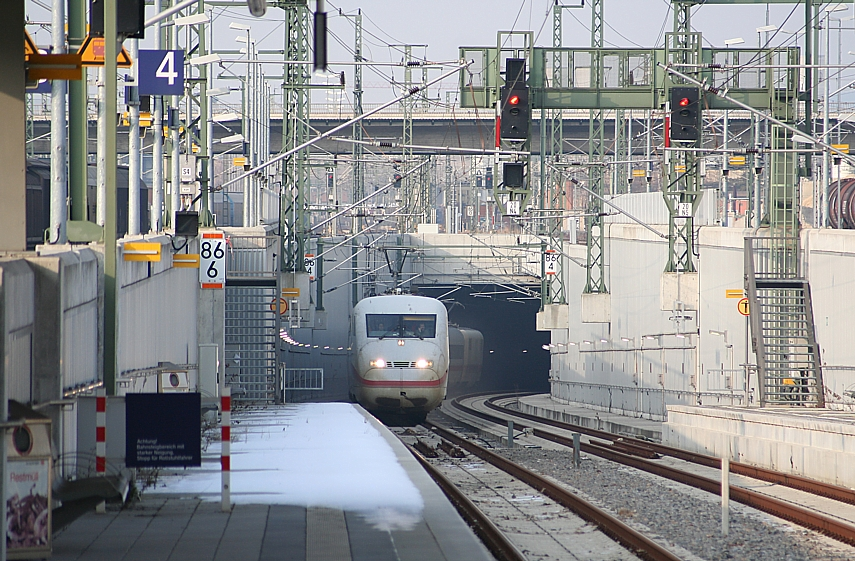
ICE S during a measurement run in front of the Audi tunnel at the start of the new line in Ingolstadt

During the first test runs at high speed, a tunnel boom occurred repeatedly at the portals of the Irlahüll and Euerwang tunnels. This necessitated the installation of sound absorbers in March and April 2006 and delayed preparations for the line's commissioning. In April 2006, the staff training trips began, during which the train drivers undertook route familiarisation trips with ICE 3 sets and carried out towing exercises. On 6 May 2006, a rescue exercise took place in the Euerwang Tunnel. The evacuation of an ICE with about 250 passengers was rehearsed through two emergency exits. A trial operation with several vehicles was carried out from 2 to 27 May.

The official opening took place on 13 May under the motto Bahn frei! Nürnberg–Ingolstadt–München – Bayerns schnellste Bahnachse (Clear the line! Nuremberg–Ingolstadt–Munich—Bavaria's fastest rail axis"). In the late morning, Bavaria's Economics Minister Erwin Huber, Interior Minister Günther Beckstein, Minister-president Edmund Stoiber, Federal Transport Minister Wolfgang Tiefensee and the then CEO of Deutsche Bahn AG Hartmut Mehdorn symbolically switched the exit signal from Munich Hauptbahnhof to green. Two ICE 3 trains, each in double sets, then ran (from 11:34 a.m.) to Nuremberg, parallel for part of the line. After the arrival of the trains on Nuremberg, an opening ceremony for invited guests took place.

National approval for operations on the line was granted by the Federal Railway Authority on 28 May 2006, prior to the start of preliminary operations. Until the formal commissioning of the line in December 2006, approval was granted in accordance with the Technical Specifications for Interoperability.

==== Cost ====
In 1991, the project was economically evaluated. It was assumed that there would be around 180 trains per day, half passenger and half freight trains. 144 passenger and 176 freight trains were used as a basis for the upgraded line; some of the freight trains were to be switched to the route via Augsburg.

On 19 January 1992, the federal government decided to have the planned new and upgraded line privately pre-financed as a pilot project for the first time with loans from the railways. The Bundestag approved this project in the 1996 Budget Act. In Section 29 (2) of the act, the maximum loan amount was set at DM 7.0 billion, with the total amount including interest of DM 15.6 billion. The repayment was to be made in instalments of up to DM 622 million. The federal government would have taken over the construction and financing costs incurred by Deutsche Bahn at the latest from the time the system was commissioned. According to a media report from the end of 1995, the repayment was to be made in 25 annual installments from 2003. Payments amounting to a total of DM 15 billion would have been involved.

In mid-1994, the planned costs (prices as of 1 January 1993) were around DM 4 billion. This figure was based on the cost estimate of over DM 3.1 billion (1 January 1989 prices), compensated for the price increase and a "balance sheet surcharge". At that time, an economic feasibility study by the Federal Audit Office had been running for four years. Around DM 2 billion was spent on the new line and around DM 1 billion on the upgraded line. In mid-1996, DM 241 million had been spent on planning, acquiring land and preliminary investigations, most of which had been borne by the federal government.

The private pre-financing was included in the financing agreement that was concluded on 19 December 1996 between the Ministry of Transport and Finance and Deutsche Bahn for a fixed price of DM 3870 million (€1978.7 million). All cost increases beyond the agreed financing framework were therefore to be borne by Deutsche Bahn.

The amount of DM 3,870 million includes planning and administration costs as well as expenses of around €170 million for construction, land acquisition and planning that were incurred prior to the signing of the agreement. Federal funding for the slab track was limited to DM 1,400 per meter (€715.8/m), and the share of planning costs incurred after December 1996 was limited to ten percent of the total. These project costs did not include around €265 million contributed by third parties. This was used to finance the Allersberg, Kinding and Ingolstadt Nord stations, the removal of 14 level crossings between Ingolstadt and Munich, the expansion of park-and-ride facilities and the upgrade of the S-Bahn between Obermenzing and Dachau.

When the financing agreement was concluded, DB Netz had already calculated that costs would amount to more than DM 4 billion. By exhausting all possibilities when awarding the contract, the originally estimated costs of DM 4.05 billion were reduced to DM 3.87 billion (including price increases). Of this, DM 2.75 billion went to the new line, the rest to the upgraded line. The commissioning of the new and upgraded line was planned for 2003; the expanded S-Bahn between Obermenzing and Dachau was to follow in 2004. The federal government's right to withdraw from private pre-financing was contractually stipulated in the financing agreement, which was invoked in 2000/2001. This avoided additional burdens on the federal budget of at least €5 billion.

The upgrade of the S-Bahn and the elimination of level crossings in the area of the upgraded line were not part of the financing agreement for the entire line. On 28 December 1998, a separate financing agreement for the construction of the S-Bahn followed between the state of Bavaria and Deutsche Bahn. Bavaria also assumed half of the total costs in the section between Dachau and Obermenzing in accordance with the Municipal Transport Financing Act (Gemeindeverkehrsfinanzierungsgesetz, GVFG), also at a fixed cost. The other half was financed from federal funds in accordance with the Federal Railways Expansion Act (Bundesschienenwegeausbaugesetz, BSchwAG). Bavaria provided DM 211 million (€108 million) for the S-Bahn.

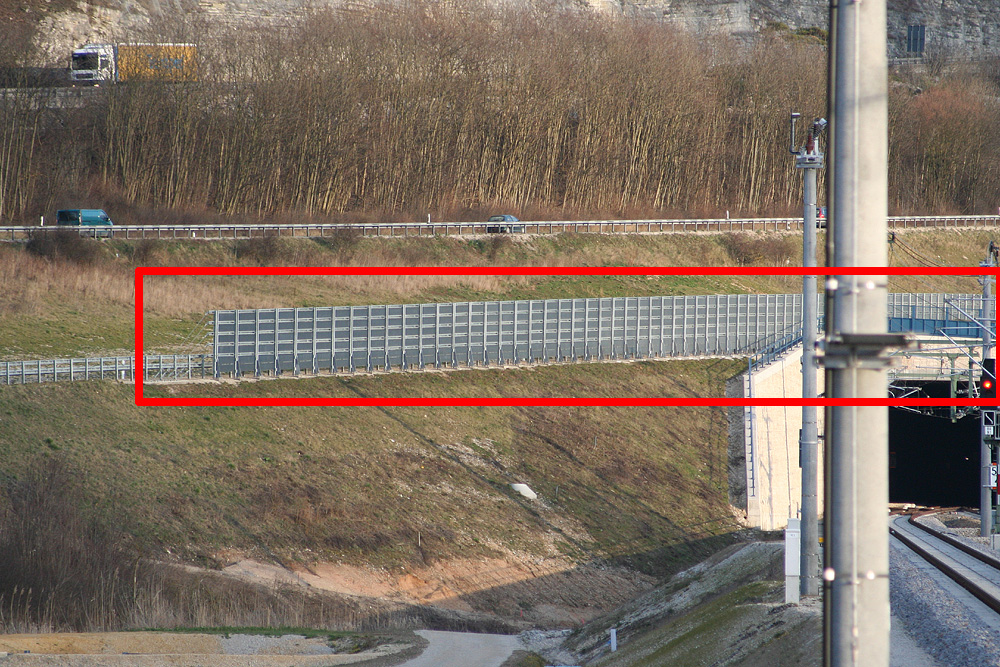
Additional costs of €11.5 million: additional agreed protection along roads on the line.

In January 2006, DB Netz put the total cost of the high-speed line at €3.573 billion. Of this, €2.049 billion are attributable to the federal government (BSchwAG), €1.154 billion to Deutsche Bahn's own funds, €190 million to the European Union (TEN program) and a total of €180 million to the state of Bavaria and municipalities (in accordance with the GVFG and the Eisenbahnkreuzungsgesetz—"Railway Crossing Act"). In addition to the financing agreement, the federal government financed individual sub-projects, such as the traffic facilities at Allersberg and Kinding stations (€4.7 million) and measures to protect roads from train cdashes. The federal government reported expenditure of €3.268 billion for the period up to 31 December 2007, of which €1.978 billion were federal funds. While the figure of €3.573 billion includes implemented and outstanding measures, the figure of €3.268 billion includes all costs actually incurred up to the end of 2007.

In 2008, €31.3 million were spent on the project. The total costs incurred up to that point added up to €3,299.86 million. The planned total costs were €3,592 million in 2011 and €3,676 million in 2012 (as of 2012). The federal government estimeated the pure construction costs of the new line at around €2.27 billion or €13.8 million per track kilometre (prices as of: 2010). In the 1996 financing agreement, costs of €8 million per kilometre of new track were calculated.

It was foreseeable that the agreed cost framework would be exceeded from 1999 and the framework was exceeded at the end of 2003. After the project was still officially on schedule in August 2000, DB admitted cost increases of up to DM 1 billion at the end of October 2000. On 6 December 2000, DB submitted a report to its supervisory board in which additional costs of at least DM 799 million were expected. Shortly thereafter, auditors determined a value of DM 1.6 billion. Of the expected unavoidable additional costs, DM 289 million was attributable to project development, DM 124 million for geological risks of the tunnel construction (which could only be assessed in 2000), and DM 119 million for control and safety technology as well as DM 112 million for fire and disaster protection.

On 13 March 2002, Deutsche Bahn told its supervisory board that the expected total costs for the project would be around €3.6 billion. Ground problems identified in the course of the construction work would have necessitated considerable additional work and new planning approval procedures. From the point of view of the time, the project was burdened with further risks.

Since the federal government's share was fixed at around €2 billion, Deutsche Bahn bore the majority of the additional costs incurred, in 2004 over €450 million. The main reasons for the cost increases include geological problems in tunnel construction, extensive plan changes (especially improvements to the safety concept), increased environmental regulations and general wage and price increases. Delays in planning approval procedures on the upgraded section also contributed to the cost increases. The additional costs of the slab track, the use of which was only decided in 2000 and also contributed to cost increases, compared to the originally planned ballasted track are given by Deutsche Bahn as one third. Savings of around €300 million result from the omission of some line improvements and station upgrades between Petershausen and Ingolstadt, with a maximum speed of 160 or 190 instead of 200 km/h throughout.

The model of private pre-financing met with sharp criticism. The Federal Audit Office, in its comments on budget management in 1997, criticised this form of raising capital as uneconomical and complained that the financing costs were "grossly disproportionate to the investment costs". He recommended dissolving the loans as soon as possible and transferring them to the federal budget. The Ministry of Transport stated that the federal government intends to follow this proposal as soon as sufficient budgetary funds were available. Since these were not initially available, the private pre-financing approved by the Bundestag was chosen in order to ensure that the economically desirable route was completed as quickly as possible. The Court of Auditors emphasised that with continuous private pre-financing, the amounts to be included in the federal budget after the commissioning of the railway for refinancing over a period of at least 15 years would be about as high as the average applications for household financing for construction during the construction phase of six to seven years. According to the Federal Railway Authority, between 1998 and April 2001 pre-financing amounts of €790 million were raised, which were taken over in 2000 and 2001 through financing from the federal budget. The total pre-financing costs amounted to around €30 million.

In its 2003 annual report, the Federal Court of Auditors also criticised the fact that the federal government had granted additional grants and interest-free loans in excess of the fixed amount. There are also additional expenses, e.g. incurred due to the federal government covering funding gaps in the existing network that arose as a result of the additional expenditure for major projects at Deutsche Bahn. The repayment amounts saved by switching from loans to construction cost subsidies from DB AG were also not fully invested in the existing network. The resulting additional burden on the federal government led to the delay of other construction projects. Due to the fact that no upgrades were carried out, additional costs were incurred due to the necessary replacement investments. Overall more than €600 million was added to the federal budget, so the core target of the agreed maximum amount of financing was missed. The auditors also criticised the fact that the budget legislature had not been included in the measures taken by the Ministry of Transport and that it was not possible to precisely determine the additional burden "due to the lack of transparency in the financing commitments".

In 2008, the Federal Court of Auditors criticised the fact that the Federal Ministry of Transport, Building and Urban Development had already paid out the entire subsidy amount to Deutsche Bahn AG, although services worth around €60 million were still outstanding on the upgraded line.

In its Black Book 2005, the taxpayers' association criticised the cost increases and emphasised that every minute of travel time reduction was bought for €65.2 million.

An estimate from 1985 assumed costs of DM 1.9 billion for a new line for 250 km/h between Nuremberg and Ingolstadt.

=== Preliminary operation ===
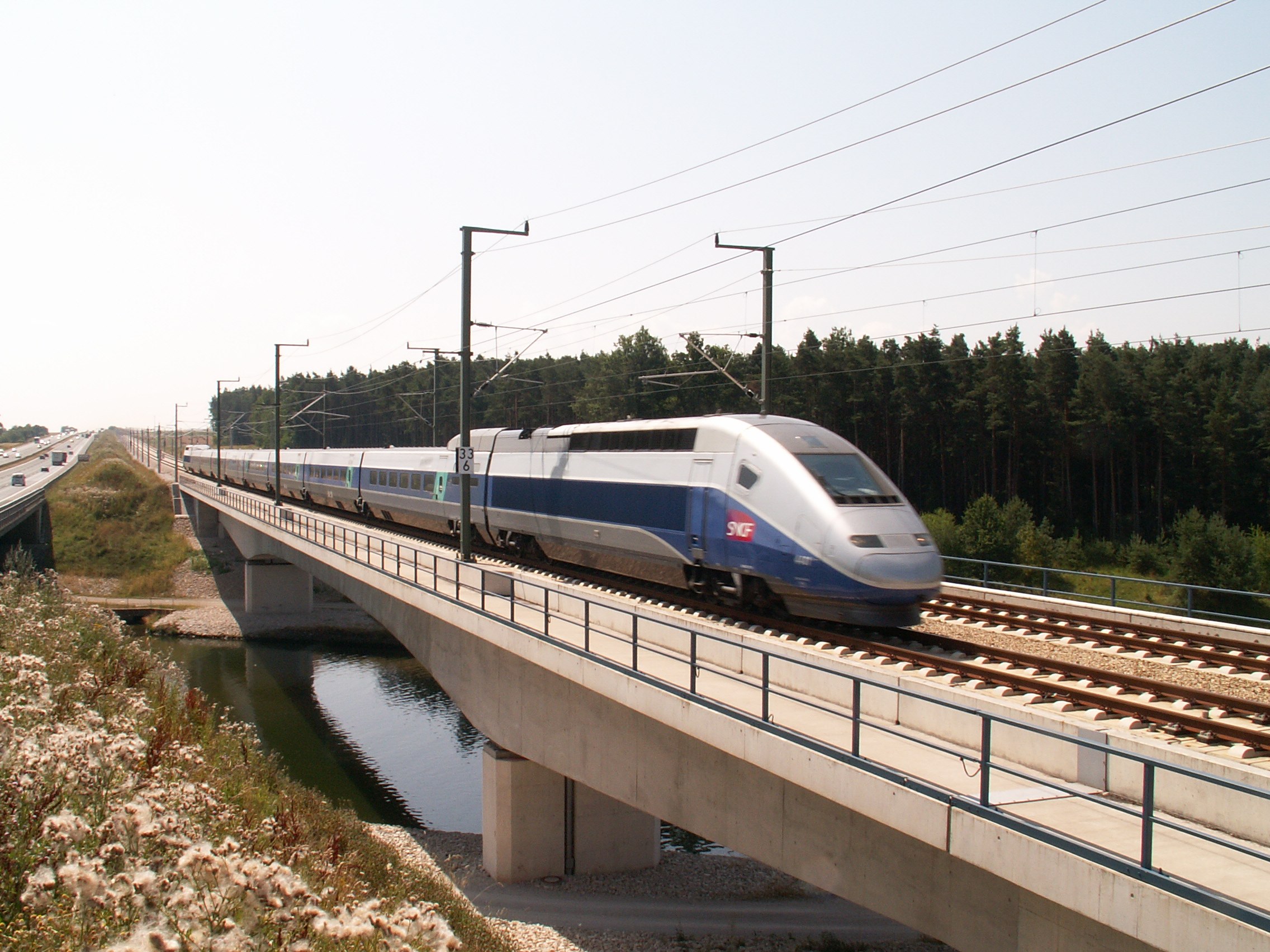
TGV POS on the Main-Danube-Canal Bridge

Between the start of operation on 28 May 2006 and the timetable change on 10 December 2006, a preliminary service ran. The shortest scheduled travel time between Nuremberg and Munich fell by 27 to 78 minutes. Only long-distance passenger trains ran at regular two-hour intervals, in particular the ICE 3 on line 41 (Dortmund/Essen–Nuremberg–Munich). The ICE T on line 28 (Munich–Berlin–Hamburg) and the ICE 926/927 trains on line 31 also operated at off-peak times, during peak hour and on weekends. The IC train pair Karwendel (IC 2410/2411) also ran over the line on Saturdays.

Since June 2005, a year before the new line was commissioned, several pairs of ICE 3 trains have been running on the old line via Treuchtlingen/Ingolstadt between Munich and Nuremberg, with a journey time of around two hours.

In July 2006, the TGV POS was used on the new line to complete trials runs at up to 330 km/h for approval in Germany. The line was fully commissioned when the timetable changed on 10 December 2006.

==== World record run on 2 September 2006 ====
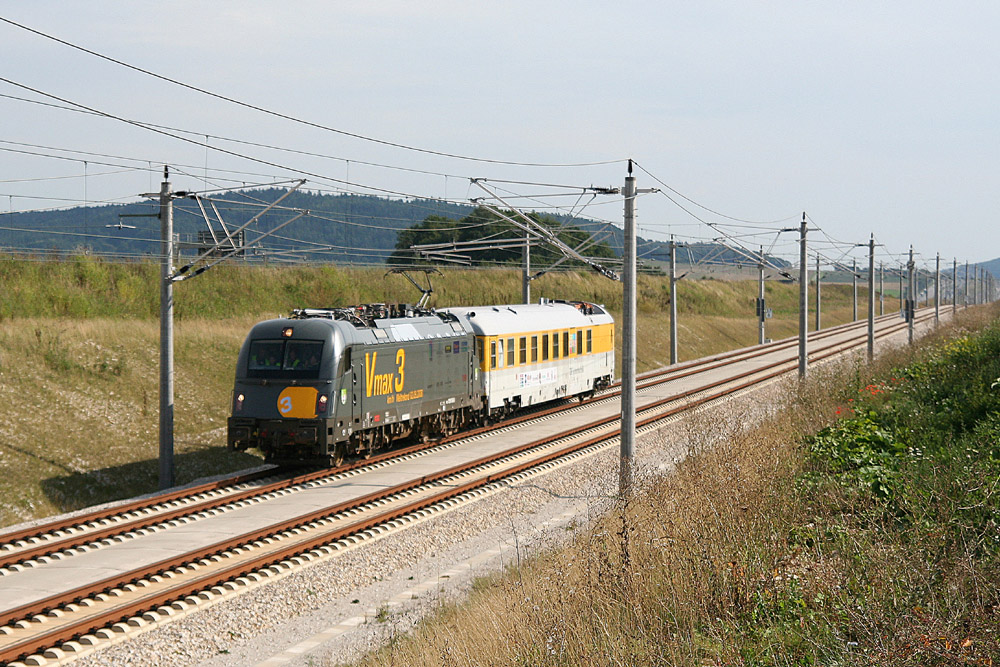
Locomotive 1216 050 and the measuring car on a world record run at 357 km/h at the truck stop near Hilpoltstein

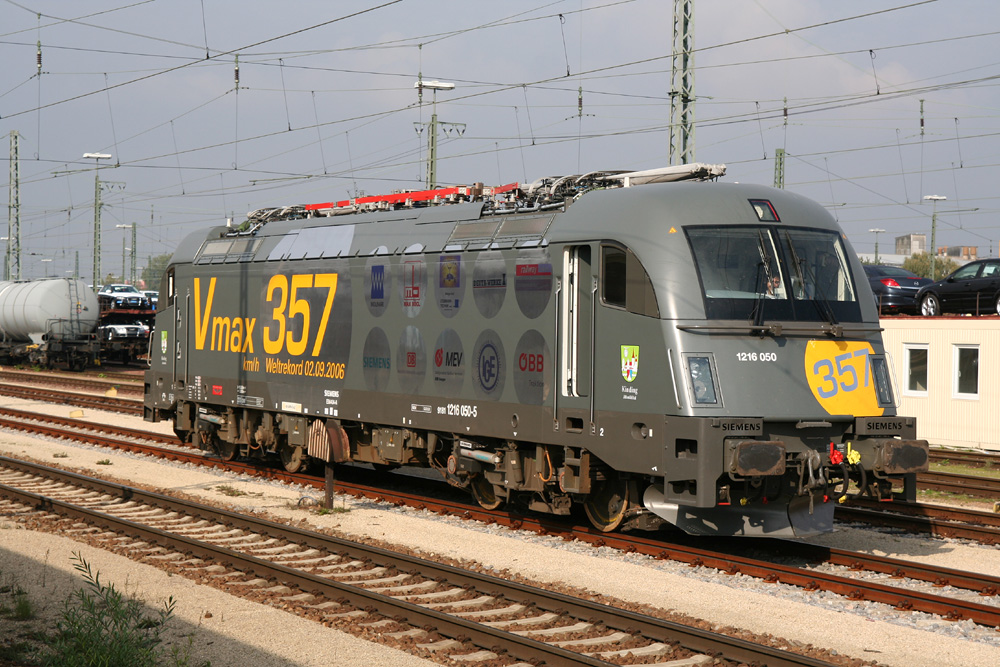
The 1216 050 in Ingolstadt Hbf

On 2 September 2006, a Siemens locomotive of the EuroSprinter 64 U4 class set a new world speed record for conventional electric locomotives. The 6,400 kilowatt multi-system locomotive reached the new record of 357.0 km/h on the second attempt at 4:03 p.m. near Hilpoltstein (Allersberg–Kinding section). It beat the record set by a French SNCF BB 9004 locomotive at 331 km/h on 29 March 1955, making it the fastest locomotive in the world. The top speed of 343.9 km/h at kilometre 34.3 was reached in the first attempt at around 3:15 p.m. The locomotive was in a largely standard condition, although some parts had been dismantled to improve air resistance.

The locomotive had attached a measuring car from DB Systemtechnik. The train protection systems (LZB and PZB) of the locomotive were switched off for both record runs, which took place on the eastern track heading towards Nuremberg; encounters with trains could also be ruled out with certainty. Therefore, the entire line in front of the train (up to around 50 kilometres) had to be free of trains. Since there was only one ICE line running regularly on the high-speed route until the timetable change on 10 December 2006, these requirements could be met without any disruption to passenger traffic.

In long tunnels and along a noise barrier at kilometre 45, the maximum permissible speed for the tests was limited to 250 km/h and 285 km/h respectively. A maximum speed of 350 km/h was only permitted on the approximately nine-kilometre section between the north portal of the Offenbau tunnel and the south portal of the Göggelsbuch tunnel. The locomotive accelerated from 285 km/h to 357.0 km/h from kilometre 45.2 onwards, the record being set at kilometre 36.6 at 4:03 p.m. The top speed was maintained for a few seconds before the engine driver braked the engine so that it could come to a stop in Allersberg station on time.

About 1,500 people followed the journey along the line and at Kinding station. Around 4:30 p.m. the locomotive arrived where a celebration and a vehicle show were taking place; the two French record locomotives could also be viewed. In order to rule out that damage had occurred to the NBS, the test train ICE S made a test run at the end of the record run to check the condition of the overhead line and the superstructure of the new line. According to DB Netz and Siemens, neither the line nor the locomotive had been specially prepared from a technical point of view. Minor adjustments included reduced brake cylinder pressure (to avoid overheating on emergency stops), an increase in engine output from 6,400 kilowatts to (briefly) 7,300 kilowatts, changes to the vehicle software and the installation of numerous sensors.

The record runs had been preceded by numerous "high-speed runs" since 21 August, in which the locomotive was gradually accelerated to 330 km/h. DB Netz issued a special permit for high-speed travel and the government of Middle Franconia issued an approval notice.

=== Further development ===
In March 2021, a speed of 360 km/h was reached during a measurement run with the ICE S and the Novo car attached to it, setting a new record for the line. Further trial runs with a top speed of up to 400 km/h were to take place in the course of 2021.

Three locations along the line were considered for a planned Nuremberg ICE plant. Only at these three locations along the high-speed line can all desired works operations be run both on the line and to Nuremberg Hauptbahnhof. This is not the case for various other locations considered on other lines. Most recently, a location in the former army ammunition facility in Feucht was considered and rejected in April 2023.

=== Effects ===
==== Route length ====
The route length between the main stations fell from 199.1 kilometres (old route via Augsburg) or 198.3 kilometres (via Treuchtlingen/Ingolstadt) to 170.8 kilometres. The linear distance between the main stations is 149.6 kilometres, the road connection via the motorway is 167 kilometres. The distance between the main stations of Würzburg and Munich went from 277.6 kilometres (old line via Ansbach, Treuchtlingen, Augsburg) to 273.0 kilometres (via Nuremberg and Ingolstadt).

==== Travel times ====
When it went into full operation on 10 December 2006, the journey time between Nuremberg and Munich in the ICE fell from around 100 (with intermediate stops in Augsburg and Pasing) to 62 minutes (without intermediate stops, although some trains take up to 71 minutes) or 66 to 74 minutes with intermediate stops in Ingolstadt. The travel time between Munich and Frankfurt/Cologne was reduced by around half an hour (compared to the route via Stuttgart). The regular travel times in regional traffic between the two main stations were reduced from two and a half to three hours to around one and a quarter (in the Munich-Nuremberg Express).

==== Capacity, operations ====
With the new line between Nuremberg and Munich, two to three independent routes are available, a total of at least four tracks. This has significantly improved capacity and operational flexibility in the event of a disruption. In the area of the new line, there is also extensive segregation, an operationally desirable separation between (fast) passenger and (slow) freight traffic. Furthermore, for long-distance trains running between Würzburg via Nuremberg to Munich, there is no need to change direction in Nuremberg.

==== Traffic shift between Augsburg and Ingolstadt routes ====
Connections to Augsburg in comparison (weekday, long-distance connections without transfers per direction)
Connection	Summer timetable 2006 (until 9 December 2006)	2007 summer timetable (from 10 December 2006)
Munich–Nuremberg (continuing towards Leipzig/Berlin, Frankfurt and Hannover)	18 (opposite direction: 19)	9 (opposite direction: 8)
Munich–Würzburg (via Ansbach [without stopping], continuing towards Hannover)	7	4

Traffic via Ingolstadt in comparison (weekday, long-distance connections without transfers per direction)
Connection	Summer timetable 2006 (until 9 December 2006)	2007 summer timetable (from 10 December 2006)
Munich–Nuremberg (continuing towards Leipzig/Berlin, Frankfurt and Hannover)	11 (all with a stop in Ingolstadt)	36 (with a stop in Ingolstadt: 22)
Nuremberg–Munich (from Leipzig/Berlin, Frankfurt and originally from Hannover)	12 (all with a stop in Ingolstadt)	40 (with a stop in Ingolstadt: 22)

While the majority of long-distance trains between Munich and Nuremberg or Würzburg previously ran via Augsburg, many ICE trains took the faster route via Ingolstadt after the route was fully operational. This shift of ICE traffic to the new line deteriorated the connections between Augsburg and Nuremberg or Würzburg and between northern Bavaria and Bavarian Swabia, Upper Swabia and the Lake Constance area and led to longer travel times.

When the timetable changed in December 2006, Augsburg lost 30 of the previous 120 daily long-distance stops. At the same time, the range of services between Munich and Berlin was increased from a two-hour to an hourly frequency, with three to four daily pairs of trains running on this line via Augsburg.

The Allgäu-Franken-Express regional express line was established to replace the ICE trains that were no longer used between Nuremberg and Augsburg. Until 2020, the trains ran between Nuremberg and Augsburg in a travel time similar to that of the ICE (around 70 minutes), sometimes with extensions to Oberstdorf, Kempten, and Lindau.

Since 2013, long-distance trains have been running from Augsburg to Berlin and Hamburg almost every hour.

On weekdays, regional express trains also run between Nuremberg and Augsburg (alternating hourly and with a change in Treuchtlingen) with a journey time of around 110 minutes. On Saturdays, Regional-Express trains run at two-hour intervals, on Sundays at two-hour intervals. Furthermore, since December 2006 there has been a two-hour service every weekday with a change in Ingolstadt (Munich-Nuremberg Express) with a travel time of around two hours.

== Operations ==
The line has been used since 28 May 2006 by long-distance trains and since 10 December 2006 by regional trains of the Munich-Nuremberg Express. From 2006 to 2020, the Allersberg Express also ran on the section between Nuremberg and Allersberg, which was then replaced by line S 5 of the Nuremberg S-Bahn.

The line is suitable for freight trains weighing around 900 t and around 600 m-long, but is not used by freight trains (as of 2015). Freight traffic can in principle be handled on the line if there is no passenger traffic on the it at the same time. However, it is forbidden between Allersberg and Ingolstadt Nord. In principle, there is a ban on passenger and freight trains meeting in tunnels at speeds over 250 km/h in Germany. This regulation was specified in 1998 in an agreement between Deutsche Bahn, the Ministry of Transport and the Federal Railway Authority. Accordingly, such encounters are technically (not only in terms of the timetable) ruled out. Such a technical solution was not yet available at the time of commissioning. In 1999, the operating program provided for a total of 80 freight trains per day. The line is to be equipped with ETCS, which would enable safe separation of passenger and freight traffic, after 2017. A feasibility study on the widespread introduction of ETCS presented in September 2018 recommended equipping the route with ETCS by 2025. According to information from the end of 2019, the ETCS equipment of the new and upgraded line is now planned by 2023.

In August 2011, Deutsche Bahn AG announced that it would stipulate that leading vehicles should be equipped with a train control system as a network access criterion for the new line. After the Federal Network Agency had rejected this in January 2012, DB Netz AG raised an objection against which a complaint lodged by the authority was unsuccessful.

According to Deutsche Bahn, the number of passengers on the route increased by 60 percent in the first four years of operation.

=== Long-distance services ===
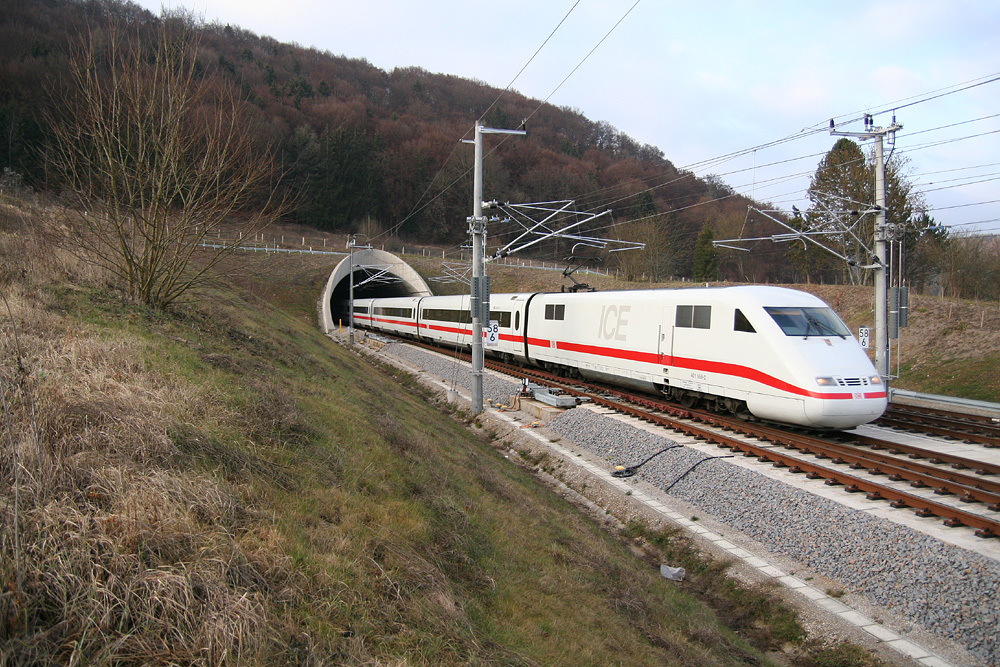
An ICE 1 leaves the Schellenberg tunnel just before Kinding station.

The line is used by the following long distance services (as of 2026):

- Munich – Nuremberg – Frankfurt – Cologne / Essen (– Dortmund) (ICE 41, hourly with gaps, ICE 3, ICE 3 Velaro D)
- Munich – Nuremberg – Kassel – Hannover – Hamburg (ICE 25, hourly, ICE 4)
- Munich – Nuremberg – Leipzig – Berlin (– Hamburg) (ICE 28, every two hours, ICE 1, ICE 4)
- Munich – Nuremberg – Halle – Berlin (ICE 29, hourly, ICE 3)

In the 2007 timetable, an ICE Sprinter ran on the route from Cologne to Munich every working day, and the Intercity train pair IC 2410/IC 2411 Mittenwald – Berlin (timetable route F20) used the route on Saturdays. These have been operating as ICE trains since the timetable change in December 2007. Some long-distance trains continue to run via Augsburg, leaving gaps in the pattern of services every 30 minutes.

When the timetable changed in December 2006, the previous overlapping two-hour intervals on ICE lines 28 and 41 were increased to more or less hourly on both lines (with some missing services). As a result there is now a largely half-hourly service between Nuremberg and Munich.

Between December 2006 and June 2007, there was a 22 percent increase in passengers in long-distance traffic between Munich and Nuremberg. In 2007, the first year with a full operating program, passenger numbers between Nuremberg and Munich increased by around 30%, with around six million passengers using the new line in 2007. Before the line went into operation, DB expected growth rates of 30 to 40 percent within three years. According to Deutsche Bahn, the number of passengers increased by 60 percent as a result of the new and upgraded line by 2010.

=== Regional services ===
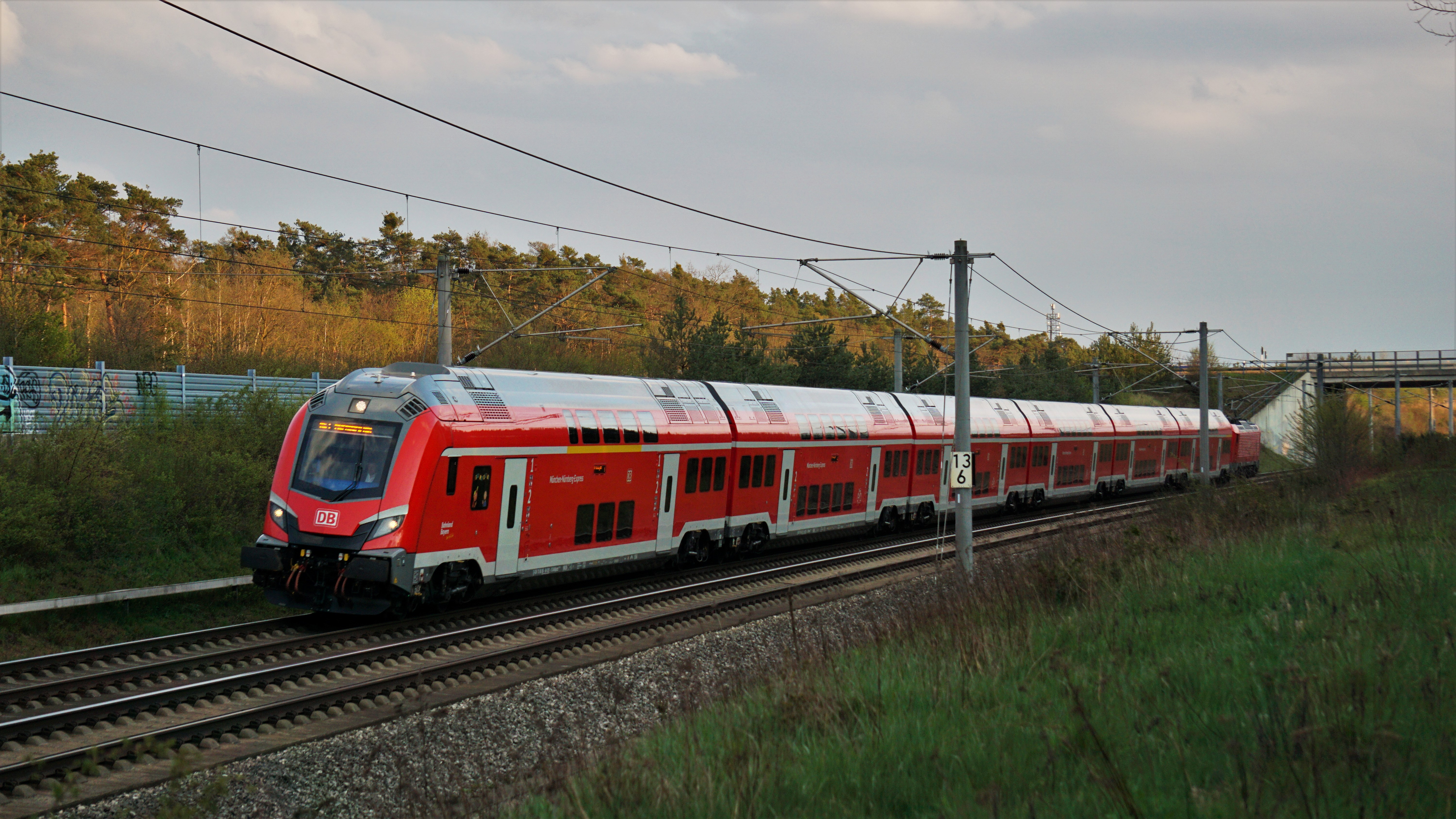
A Škoda push-pull train set operating as the Munich Nuremberg Express

. The new line has also been used for local rail passenger transport since December 2006. The Munich-Nuremberg Express (RE 1) runs every two hours between Nuremberg and Munich. These trains are (since December 2020) made up of Škoda 109 E3 (DB class 102) locomotives and Škoda push–pull train sets. Until December 2022, it was the only regional express in Germany operating at more than 180 km/h and the first to travel the full length of a new German high-speed line. Since then, RE 200 trains have been running in Baden-Württemberg at 200 km/h on the Wendlingen–Ulm high-speed railway.

In addition, a regional train shuttle service operated between Nuremberg and Allersberg until 2020 as the Allersberg Express. The regional trains were originally operated with locomotives of class 111 or 112 and modernised n-coaches, with a maximum speed of 140 km/h. Before they were integrated into the Nuremberg S-Bahn, former long-distance coaches with class 101 locomotives were used, as was the case with the Munich-Nuremberg Express, which could travel at speeds of up to 200 km/h.

Both regional services were operated by Deutsche Bahn in December 2006 for an initial period of seven years and then put out to tender for a long-term period of ten years. The service covers 1.7 million kilometres annually. According to DB information, around 70 people are employed to handle regional traffic.

Around 5,000 travelers use the Munich-Nuremberg Express every day. Approximately 700 passengers use the seven newly established bus routes in Allersberg and the two in Kinding on weekdays.

Since 2020, a line S5 of the Nuremberg S-Bahn has run between Nuremberg and Allersberg as the successor to the Allersberg-Express. Four Alstom Coradia Continental railcars (class 1440), specially equipped with the Linienzugbeeinflussung automatic train control system, now operate this service.

== See also ==
- High-speed rail in Germany
