= Gauchsbach =

River in Germany

- Footbridge with weir on the Gauchsbach at Feucht

Location
- Country: Germany
- State: Bavaria

Physical characteristics
- Mouth
  - location: Schwarzach
  - coordinates: 49.3614°N 11.1736°E
- Length: 14.5 km (9.0 mi)

Basin features
- Progression: Schwarzach→ Rednitz→ Regnitz→ Main→ Rhine→ North Sea

Gauchsbach is a river of Bavaria, Germany. It passes through Feucht and flows into the Schwarzach near Wendelstein.

== See also ==
- List of rivers of Bavaria
