= Nuremberg–Regensburg railway =

Railway line in Bavaria, Germany

Nuremberg Hbf – Regensburg Hbf
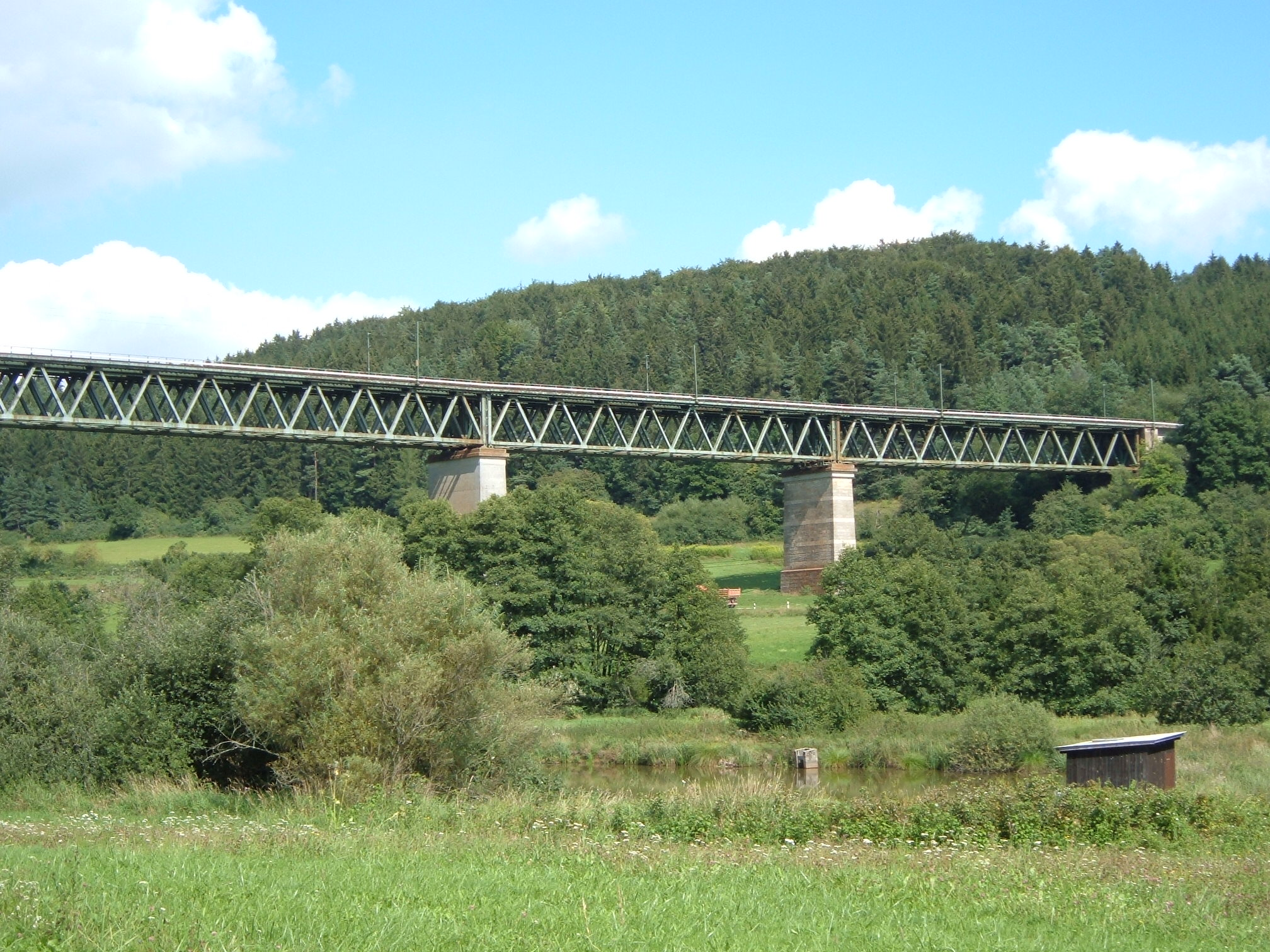
- Laber viaduct

Overview
- Line number: 5850
- Locale: Bavaria, Germany

Service
- Route number: 880

Technical
- Line length: 100.6 km (62.5 mi)
- Track gauge: 1,435 mm (4 ft 8 1/2 in) standard gauge
- Electrification: 15 kV/16.7 Hz AC catenary
- Operating speed: 200 km/h (120 mph) (maximum)

The Nuremberg–Regensburg railway is a 100-kilometre (62 mi) long mainline railway in the German state of Bavaria that runs from Nuremberg via Neumarkt in der Oberpfalz and Parsberg to Regensburg. It is one of the main routes to Austria for passengers and a link for regional transport between the Nuremberg region and the major centre of Regensburg. It is also one of the major routes for freight traffic to Eastern Europe. The line was opened by the Bavarian Eastern Railway Company between 1871 and 1873.

== History ==
The line was planned from 1869 by the Bavarian Eastern Railway (German: AG der Bayerischen Ostbahnen) as a short cut between Nuremberg and Regensburg, over 40 km (25 mi) shorter than the line via Hersbruck, Amberg and Schwandorf opened in 1859, which is now the Nuremberg–Schwandorf line and part of the Regensburg–Weiden line.

The line was originally built as a single track and was duplicated between 1894 and 1896. It was electrified in 1950. On 15 June 1988 construction began on the second line of the Nuremberg S-Bahn. The Nuremberg–Feucht section has been modified so that S-Bahn trains run on their own tracks next to the mainline tracks; these were opened on 21 November 1992. The Felstor tunnel in the Naab valley, with a length of 16 metres (according to other sources: 10 metres) was the shortest railway tunnel in Germany until 31 May 2010, when its roof was removed with explosives because its renovation was considered too expensive.

=== Opening dates ===
The line was opened in three stages:

- Nuremberg–Neumarkt: 1 December 1871
- Neumarkt–Seubersdorf: 15 May 1873
- Seubersdorf–Regensburg: 1 July 1873

The reason for the different opening dates was a delay in completing the Laber viaduct between Neumarkt and Seubersdorf.

== Route ==
Starting at Nürnberg Hauptbahnhof, the line turns southeast and passes through the Nuremberg districts of Gleißhammer, Zerzabelshof and Langwasser and past the Lorenzer Reichwald (national forest) to Feucht, where the route to Altdorf branches off. From there it runs almost directly to Schwarzenbruck and crosses the Schwarzach river just past Ochenbruck station. The route now crosses the first ridge of the Franconian Alb, eventually reaching Postbauer-Heng. There, the route bends to the east, runs through a gap between the Grünberg and Tyrolberg mountains and enters the Neumarkt basin. It runs across the basin in a straight line to the southeast partly on embankments through Pölling to Neumarkt station, from where the former Sulz Valley Railway branched off to the south. Passing the Neumarkt district of Hasenheide, the line swings south and above Sengenthal the line begins to climb the Franconian Alb. Only remnants are left of the former George Behringer KG (HeidelbergCement) siding.

Shortly after Sengenthal the line turns east and runs to Deining station. The line crosses a valley on an embankment and gains height and shortly afterwards reaches the European Watershed at a height of about 510 m above sea level. After about two kilometres, the route crosses the impressive Laber Viaduct over the valley of the Weiße Laber. The line now runs roughly south-east through the furrowed valleys of the Franconian Alb, some of which are crossed on bridges and some partly on embankments. There are deep cuttings through major ranges, including near Kleinalfalterbach and Seubersdorf. Nearby is Seubersdorf station, where a junction to a branch line to Velburg was planned. The line continue through cuttings and embankments to Parsberg station, which also serves as the unloading station for the transfer of military vehicles to the nearby Hohenfels Military training camp.

Above Mausheim the line reaches the high plateau of the Franconian Alb and runs to Beratzhausen station, which is located on the southern slopes of the valley of the Schwarze Laber above the village of Beratzhausen. The line soon crosses the valley and reaches Laaber station on the northern slope of the valley. The line runs further to the southeast above the valley of the Schwarze Laber, reaching Undorf station, and turns to the east towards the Naab. It passes through Etterzhausen and then runs east on the slope above the valley of the Naab.

The line crosses the Danube at the confluence of the Naab and the Regensburg–Ingolstadt railway from Ingolstadt and runs directly to the east. It runs through the Regensburg district of Prüfening and the Regensburg freight yard and finally reaches Regensburg Hauptbahnhof.

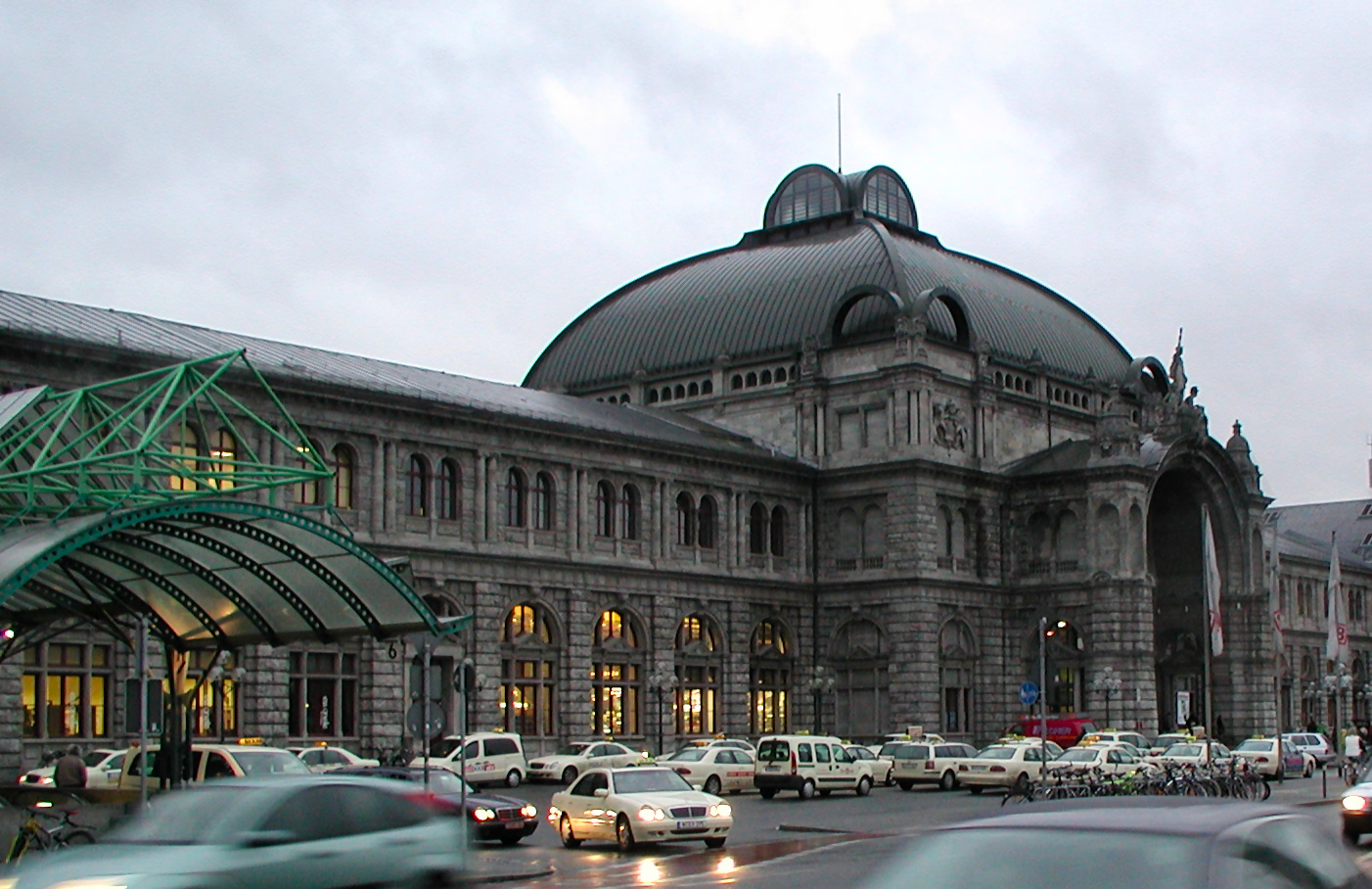
Nürnberg Hauptbahnhof

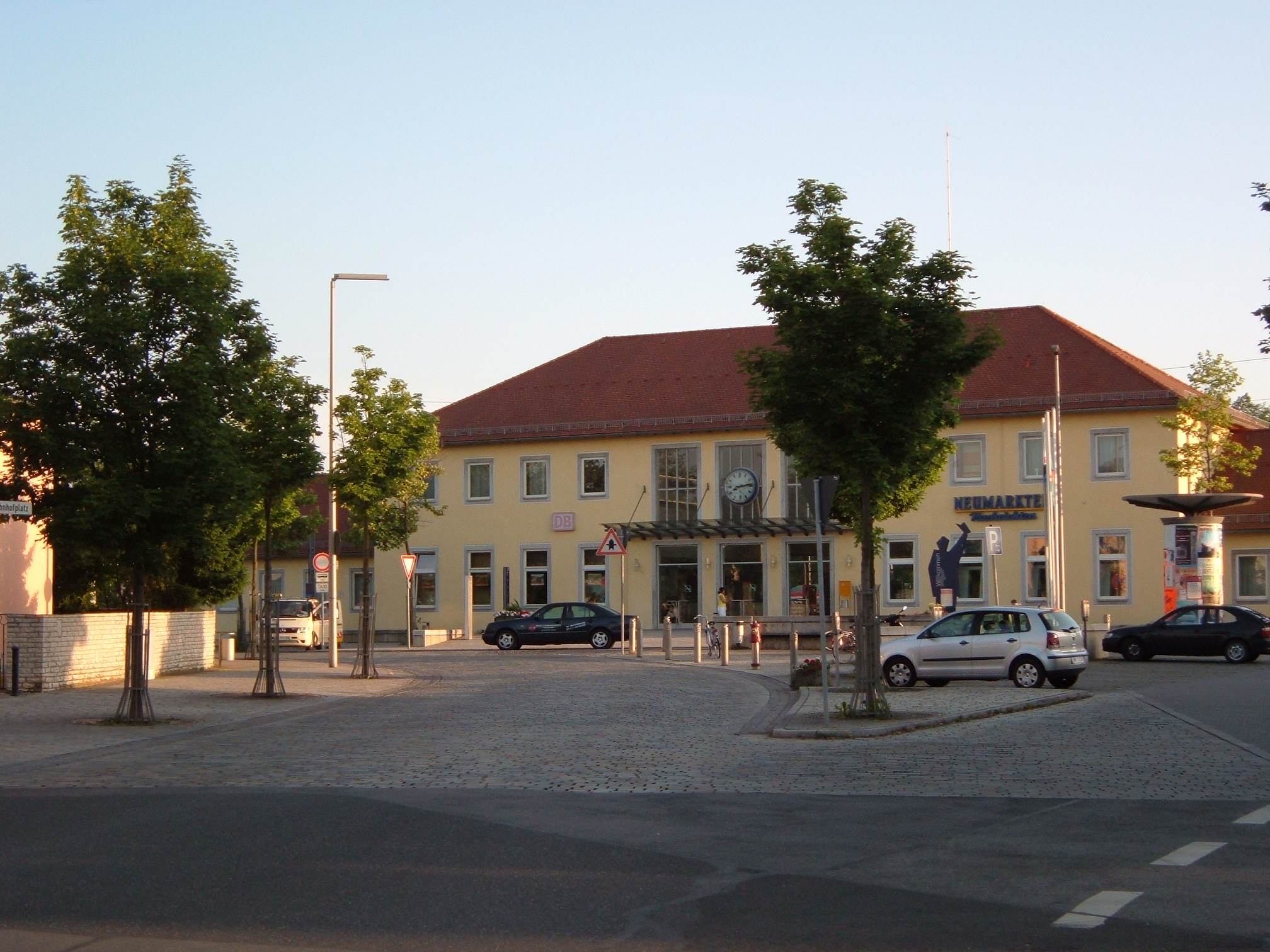
Neumarkt station

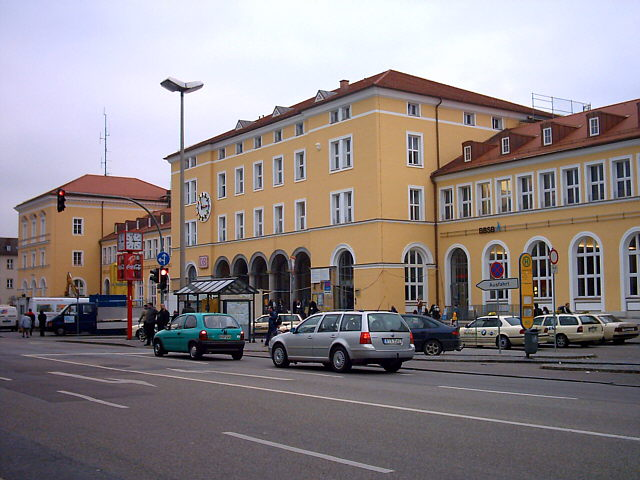
Regensburg Hauptbahnhof

=== Upgrading ===
The line is completely double track and electrified. In 2007 the route was upgraded for active tilting, including work on overhead lines, signalling and bridges at a cost of € 6.7 million.

Between Nuremberg Hauptbahnhof and Feucht the S-Bahn line between Nuremberg and Feucht runs parallel as one or two tracks. Between Reichwald junction (near Feucht) and Nuremberg Hbf the tracks are shared with the Nuremberg–Ingolstadt high-speed railway. The line-speed is 160 km/h.

=== Transport associations ===
The Nuremberg–Parsberg section of the line is served by Regionalbahn line R5 of the Greater Nuremberg Transport Association (Verkehrsverbund Großraum Nürnberg, VGN). Between Neumarkt and Regensburg the line is integrated in the Regensburg Transport Association (Regensburger Verkehrsverbund, RVV).

== Operations ==
Long-distance services consist of InterCity Express (ICE-T) services, operated with class 411 and 415 rolling stock, and a pair InterCity services hauled by Class 101 locomotives. Austrian Federal Railways locomotives are no longer used for passenger transport on the line.

Regional transport includes Regional-Express (RE) trains on the Nuremberg–Neumarkt–Parsberg–Beratzhausen–Regensburg route, continuing to Munich, normally composed of class 111 electric locomotives and double deck carriages. Regionalbahn (RB) trains are operated between Nuremberg and Neumarkt and between Neumarkt and Regensburg. Some trains run continuously from Nuremberg to Regensburg. The trains are composed of n-coach sets, hauled by class 143 electric locomotives on the Nuremberg–Neumarkt section or class 111 locomotives between Neumarkt and Regensburg.

The Nuremberg–Neumarkt section is operated as line S4 of the Nuremberg S-Bahn with class 143 electric locomotives and sets of “x” carriages, while awaiting an approval for class 442 (Talent 2) electric multiple units to operate in Nuremberg.
