= Postbauer-Heng station =

Railway station in Germany

Postbauer-Heng
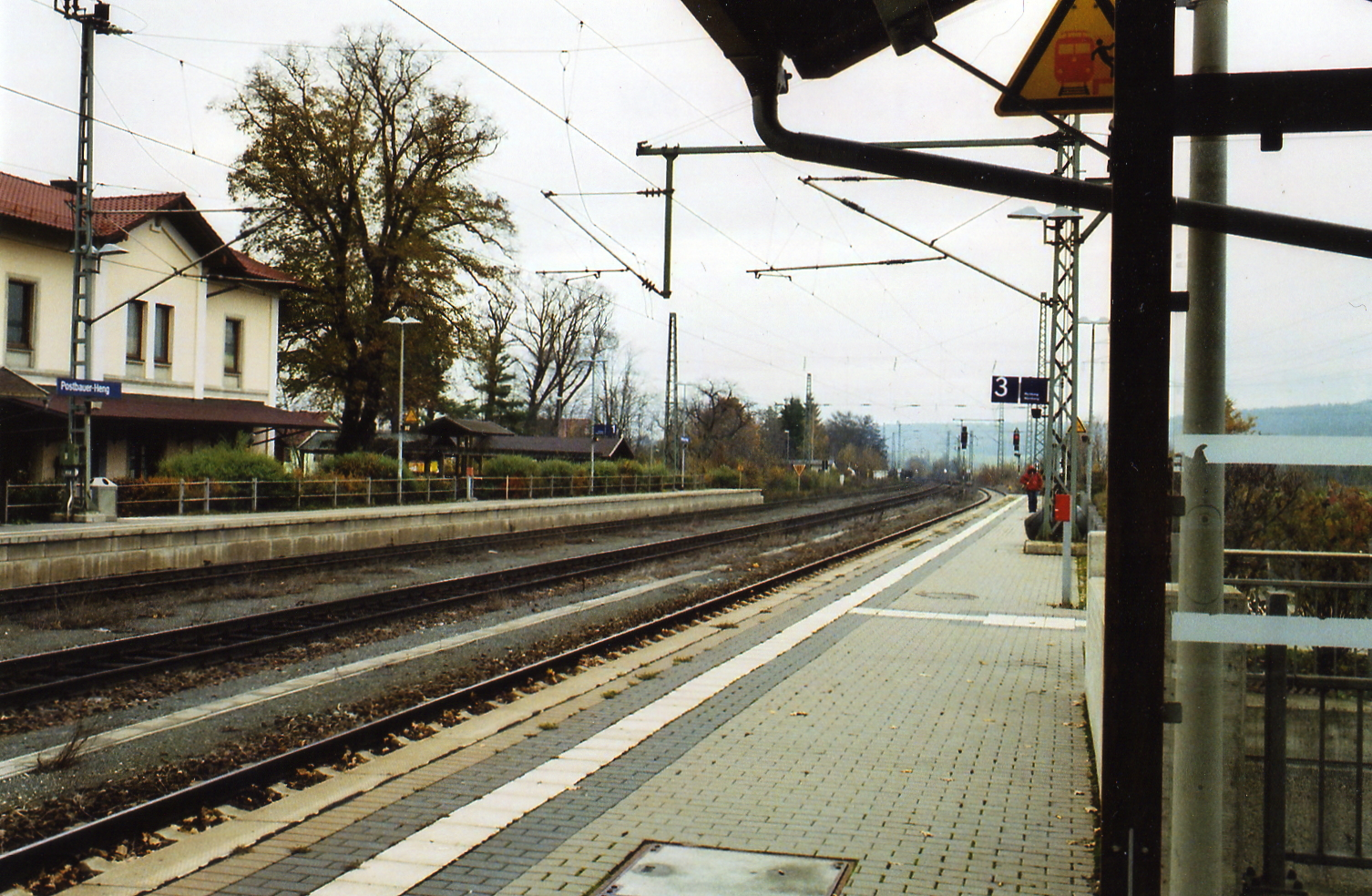
- The station in 2007

General information
- Location: Bahnhofstraße 13; Postbauer-Heng, Bavaria; Germany
- Coordinates: 49°18′32″N 11°21′32″E
- Owner: DB Netz
- Operator: DB Station&Service
- Lines: Nuremberg–Regensburg (KBS 880)
- Distance: 73.5 km (45.7 mi) from Regensburg Hauptbahnhof
- Platforms: 2 side platforms
- Tracks: 2
- Train operators: DB Regio Bayern

Other information
- Station code: 5009
- DS100 code: NPOH
- IBNR: 8004875
- Category: 5
- Fare zone: VGN: 537
- Website: www.bahnhof.de

History
- Opened: 1 December 1871

Key dates
- 1978: Station renamed
- 1998: Station refurbished

Services
Preceding station	Nuremberg S-Bahn	Following station
Oberferrieden towards Bamberg	S1	Pölling towards Neumarkt (Oberpfalz)
Location

Postbauer-Heng station is a railway station serving the municipality of Postbauer-Heng situated in the German district of Neumarkt. It is situated at km 73.5 of the Nuremberg-Regensburg railway line. The station was named Postbauer until 1978 but was renamed when the municipalities of Postbauer and Heng merged. The platforms have been refurbished in 1998 in anticipation of the Nuremberg S-Bahn line to Neumarkt, which will become operational in 2010.

The station lies within the area of the VGN transport association.
