= Neumarkt–Dietfurt railway =

Railway line in Germany

Overview
- Native name: Sulztalbahn
- Line number: 5930
- Locale: Bavaria, Germany

Service
- Route number: 871 (1987)

Technical
- Line length: 37.0 km (23.0 mi)
- Track gauge: 1,435 mm (4 ft 8 1/2 in) standard gauge

The Neumarkt–Dietfurt railway (also called the Sulztalbahn–Sulz Valley Railway) was a branch line between Neumarkt in der Oberpfalz and Dietfurt an der Altmühl in the German state of Bavaria. It ran south of Neumarkt along the Sulz and largely parallel to the Ludwig Canal to Beilngries and from there along the Altmühl to Dietfurt.

== History ==
At the completion of the Neumarkt–Nuremberg line in 1871 and its subsequent extension soon after to Regensburg, plans were developed to connect the communities between Neumarkt and Eichstätt to the railway. Various alternatives were discussed, including routes to Breitenbrunn and Kelheim, but were soon discarded. In 1886, plans were finalised and the building of the Neumarkt–Beilngries–Dietfurt line started. In Greißelbach a line would branch to Freystadt and in Beilngries the line would meet the Altmühl Valley Railway from Eichstätt station.

The Neumarkt–Beilngries section was opened for passenger services on 1 June 1888 and it was extended to Dietfurt on 11 September 1909. At first, the line had great success in both freight and passenger operations. It also competed directly with the parallel Ludwig Canal and eventually contributed to its economic decline. With the increase of motorised road transport, however, its existence was soon threatened. On 26 May 1967, the Dietfurt–Beilngries section was closed.

The construction of the new Rhine–Main–Danube Canal between Bamberg and Kelheim finally ushered in the end of the Sulz Valley Railway: the line, particularly in the area of Beilngries, was in the way of the major project. On 25 September 1987, the last passenger train ran between Neumarkt and Beilngries, freight traffic on the Greißelbach–Beilngries section ended to 29 July 1989. Between 28 August 1989 and 30 November 1989, the line was dismantled south of Greißelbach station and only the Neumarkt–Greißelbach section remained open temporarily. At the end of 31 October 1991, the rest of the line was abandoned and the operating part of the line was cut back to the 5.5 km point. The remaining track was downgraded to a siding connecting to the siding of the Max Bögl construction company.

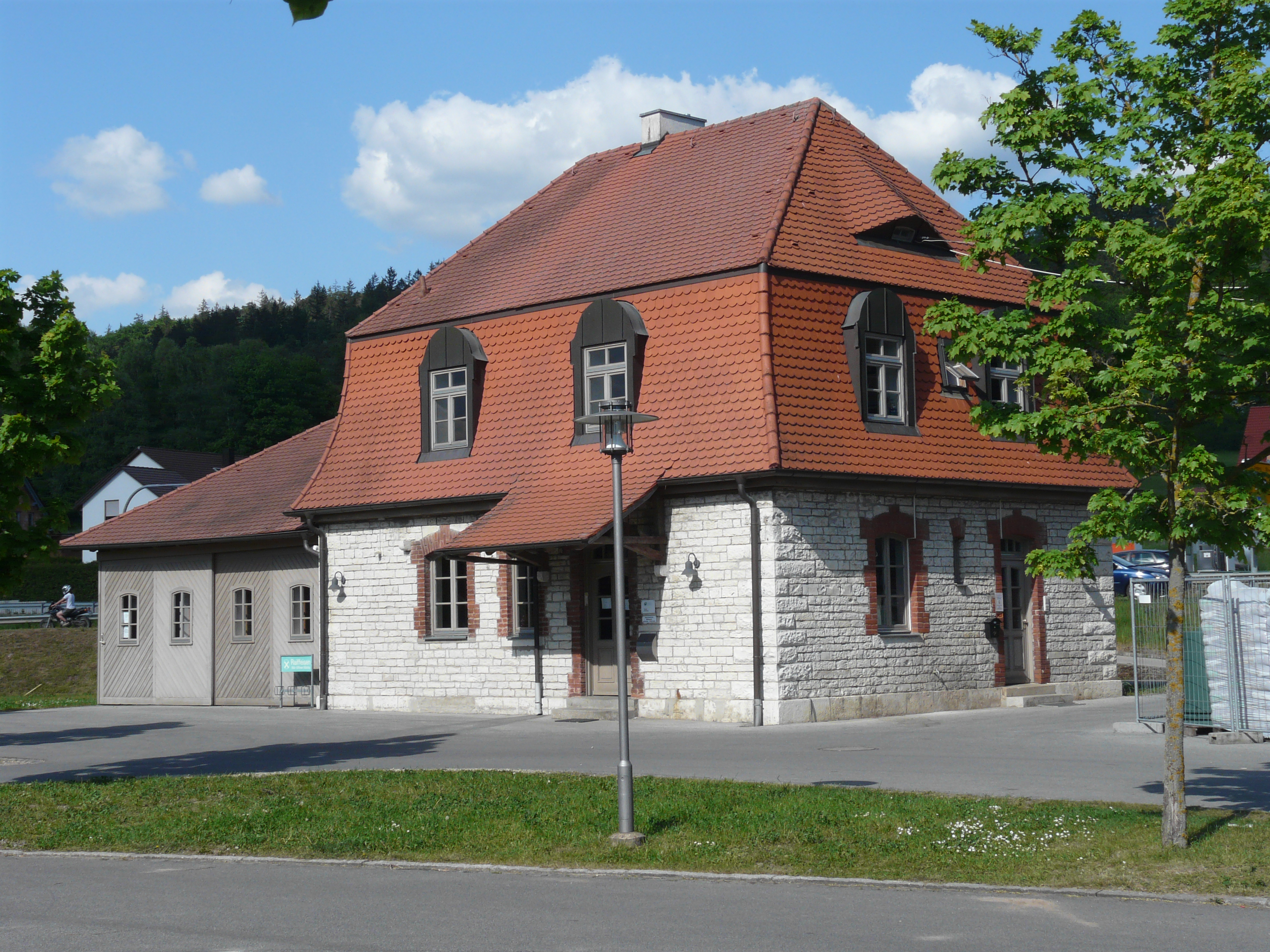
Former Berching station

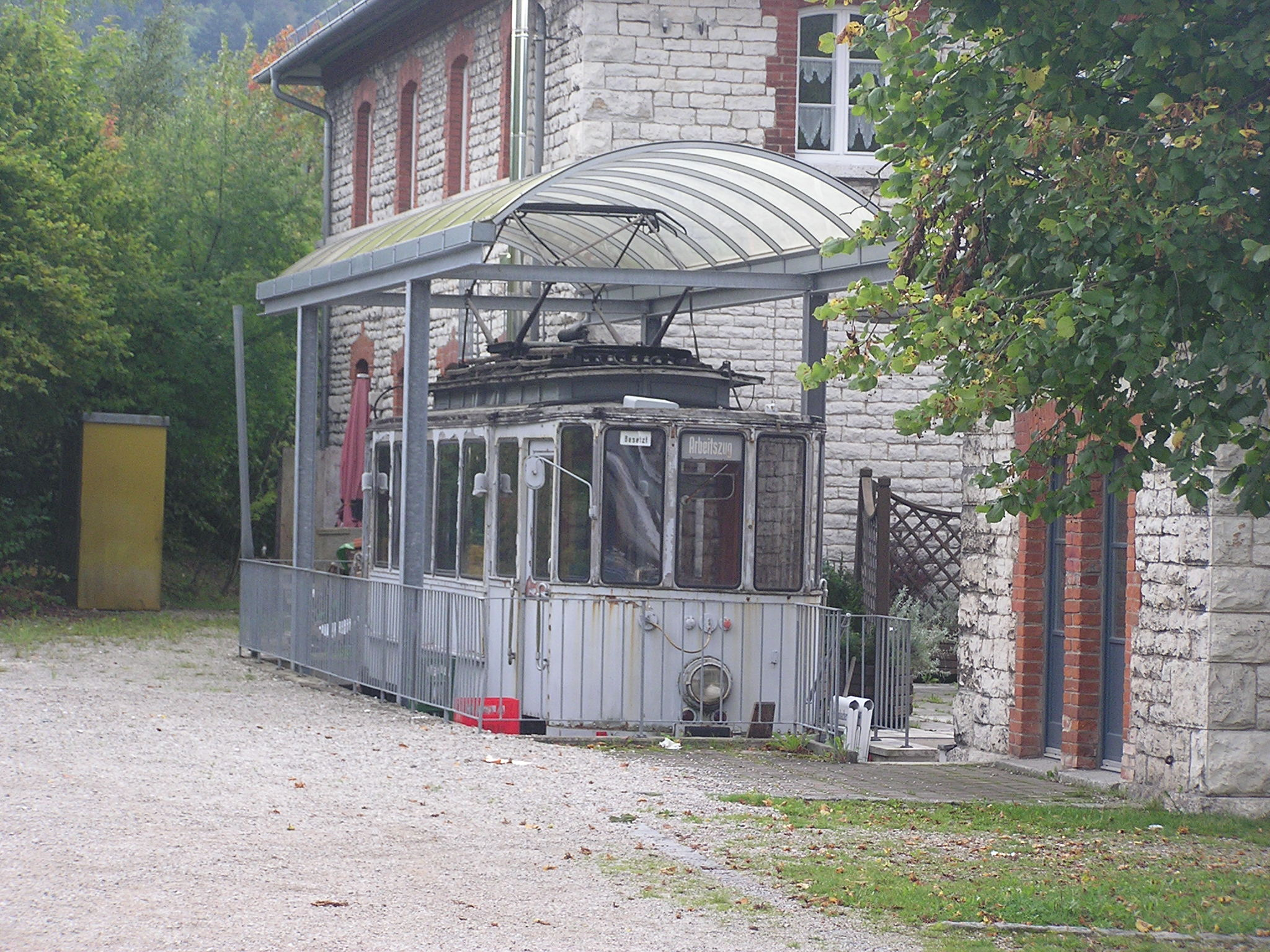
Former Beilngries station with a former Rheinbahn tram
