= Schwarzach (Rednitz) =

River in Germany

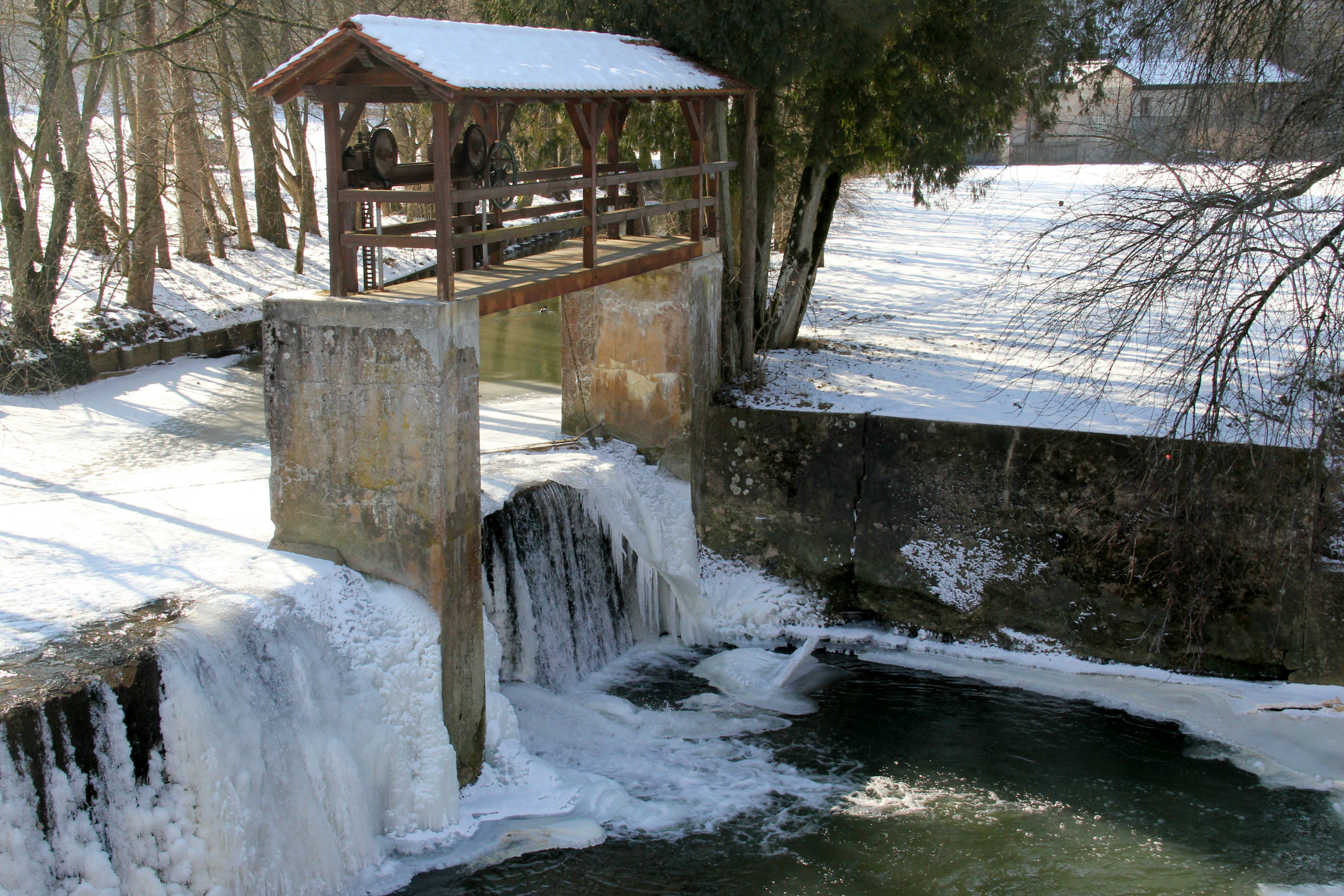

Location
- Country: Germany
- State: Bavaria

Physical characteristics
- Mouth
  - location: Rednitz
  - coordinates: 49.3314°N 11.0697°E
- Length: 56.2 km (34.9 mi)
- Basin size: 304 km^{2} (117 sq mi)

Basin features
- Progression: Rednitz→ Regnitz→ Main→ Rhine→ North Sea

Schwarzach (German pronunciation: [ˈʃvaʁtsax]) is a river of Bavaria, Germany. It is a right tributary of the Rednitz near Schwabach.

== See also ==
- List of rivers of Bavaria
