= Wissinger Laber =

River in Germany

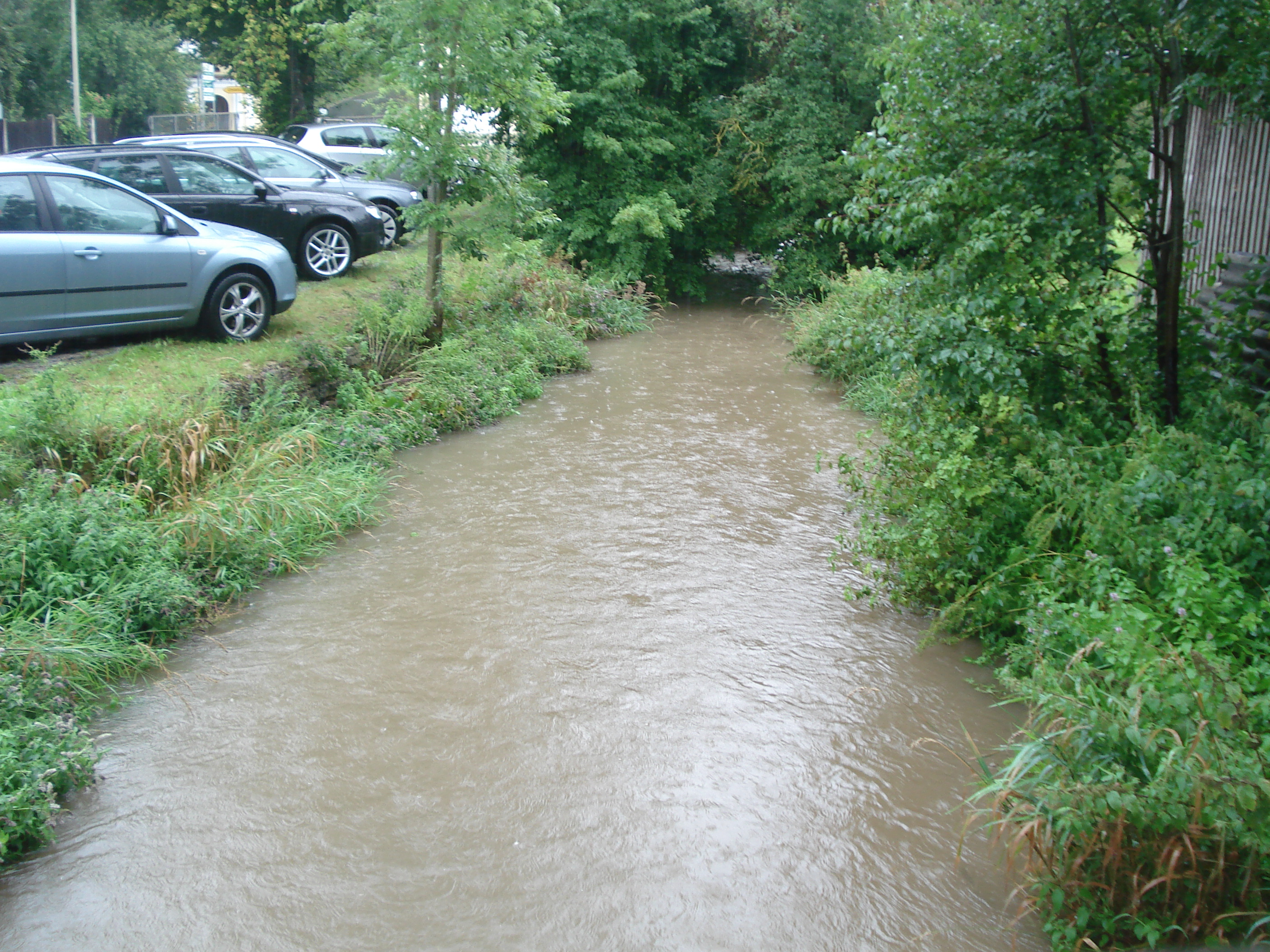
- Wissinger Laber in Breitenbrunn

Location
- Country: Germany subdivision_type2 = State
- State: Bavaria

Physical characteristics
- Source
  - location: near Freihausen
  - coordinates: 49°08′31″N 11°33′54″E
  - elevation: 476.8 m (1,564 ft)
- Mouth
  - location: Breitenbrunner Laber
  - coordinates: 49.0819°N 11.6221°E
- Length: 13.3 km (8.3 mi)

Basin features
- Progression: Breitenbrunner Laber→ Weiße Laber→ Altmühl→ Danube→ Black Sea

The Wissinger Laber is the right headwater of the Breitenbrunner Laber in the Franconian Jura in Bavaria, Germany.

The Wissinger Laber arises south-east of Freihausen. It runs in a south-east direction through the village of Ittelhofen to the village of Wissing. Passing Aumühle the Wissinger Laber reaches Breitenbrunn where it issues together with the Bachhaupter Laber into the Breitenbrunner Laber.

== See also ==
- List of rivers of Bavaria
