= Laber =

Laber or Laaber is an element in Bavarian place names which goes back to the word Labera meaning "foaming water". The spellings Laber and Laaber are interchangeable in older texts, and are still not always consistently distinguished today.

It may refer to several places, all located in the state of Bavaria, Germany:

== Rivers spelled Laber ==
- Bachhaupter Laber
- Breitenbrunner Laber
- Große Laber
- Kleine Laber
- Schwarze Laber
- Weiße Laber
- Wissinger Laber
  - Labertal ('Laber valley'), the river valley of any of the above
  - Labertaler, a brand of mineral water produced in Regensburg

== Populated places spelled Laaber ==
- Laaber, a market town in the district of Regensburg, situated on the Schwarze Laber
  - Laaber-Verlag, a publishing house based in Laaber (Regensburg).
- Laaber, a village near Pilsach in the district of Neumarkt, source of the Schwarze Laber.
- Laaber, a village near Rohr in Niederbayern in the district of Kehlheim.
