= Breitenbrunner Laber =

River in Germany

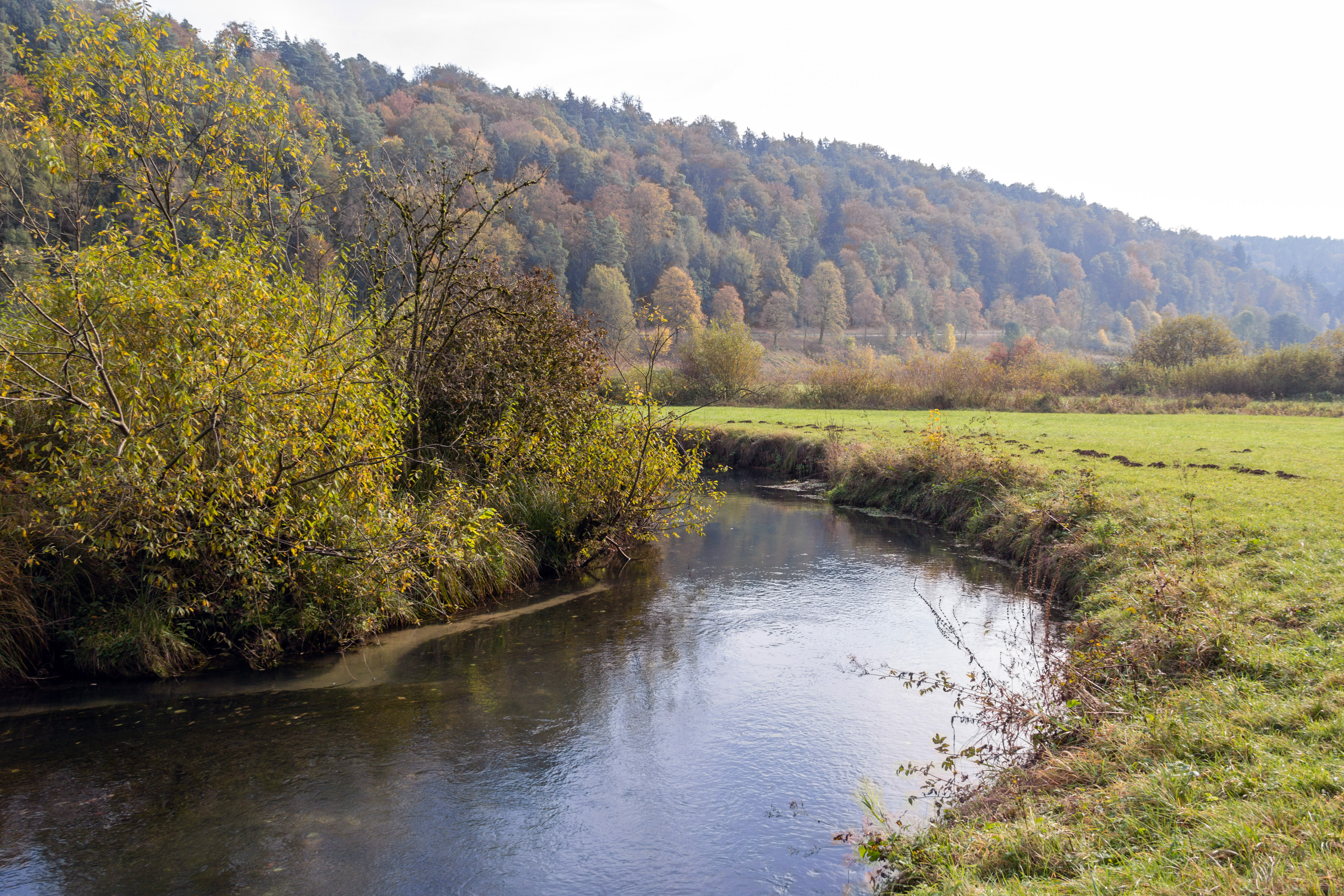
- The Breitenbrunner Laber at Breitenbrunn

Location
- Country: Germany
- State: Bavaria

Physical characteristics
- Mouth
  - location: Weiße Laber
  - coordinates: 49.0441°N 11.5985°E
- Length: 7.8 km (4.8 mi)

Basin features
- Progression: Weiße Laber→ Altmühl→ Danube→ Black Sea

Breitenbrunner Laber is a river in the Franconian Jura of Bavaria, Germany. It is formed at the confluence of the Wissinger Laber and the Bachhaupter Laber in Breitenbrunn. It flows into the Weiße Laber near Dietfurt.

== See also ==
- List of rivers of Bavaria
