= Wiesing (disambiguation) =

Wiesing is a municipality in the Schwaz district in the Austrian state of Tyrol.

Wiesing may also refer to:

- Wiesing (Altenthann), a subdivision (Ortsteil) in Altenthann municipality, Germany
- Wiesing Castle, Germany
- Lambert Wiesing, German philosopher

== See also ==
- Wiesinger (surname)
- Wissing
