= Bachhaupter Laber =

River of Bavaria, Germany

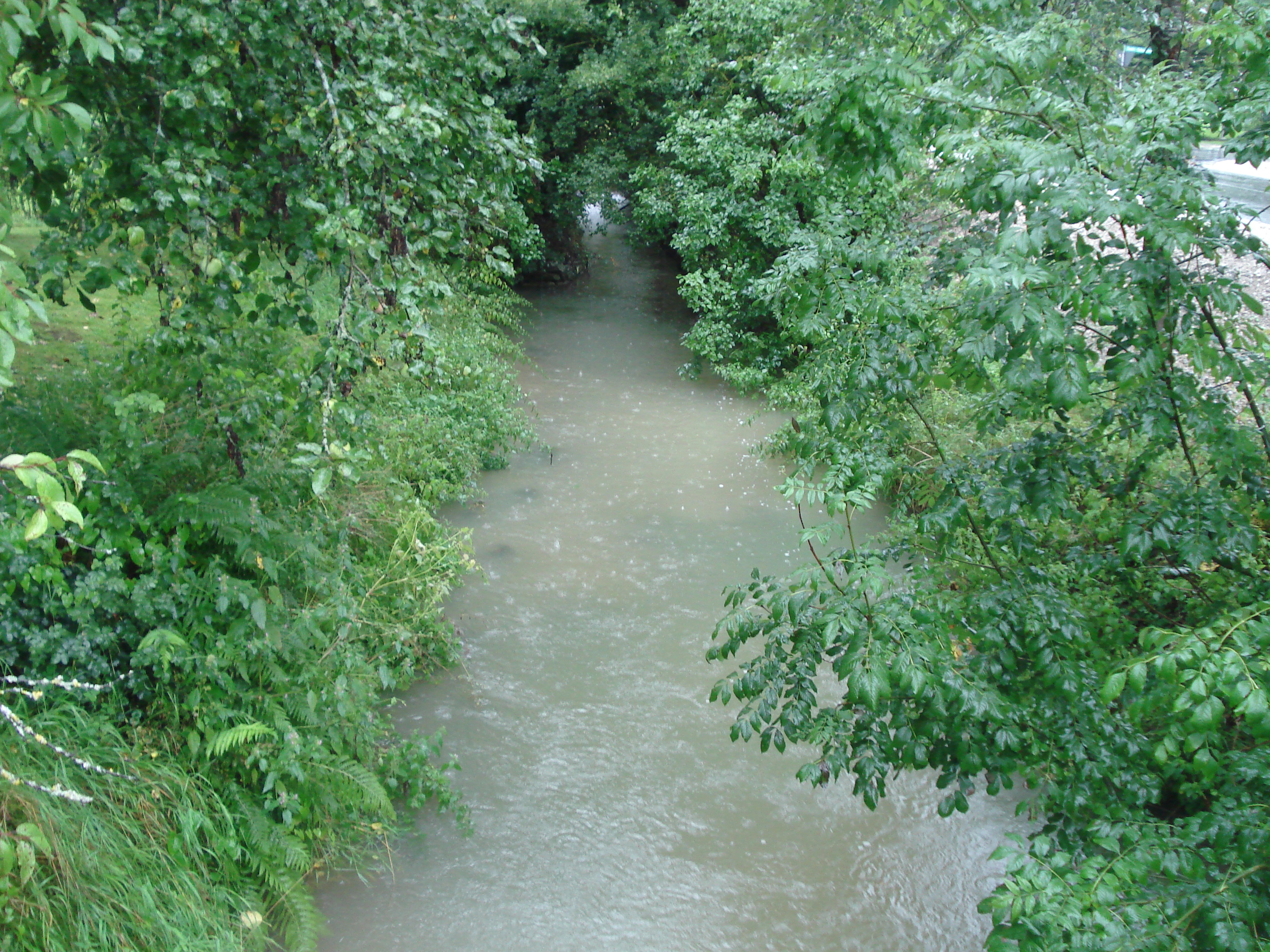
- The Bachhaupter Laber in Breitenbrunn

Location
- Country: Germany
- State: Bavaria

Physical characteristics
- Mouth
  - location: Breitenbrunner Laber
  - coordinates: 49.0818°N 11.6222°E
- Length: 2.6 km (1.6 mi)

Basin features
- Progression: Breitenbrunner Laber→ Weiße Laber→ Altmühl→ Danube→ Black Sea

Bachhaupter Laber is a small river in Bavaria, Germany. At its confluence with the Wissinger Laber in Breitenbrunn, the Breitenbrunner Laber is formed.

== See also ==
- List of rivers of Bavaria
