= Arzberg =

Arzberg may refer to:

- Arzberg, Bavaria, a town in the district of Wunsiedel, Bavaria, Germany
- Arzberg, Saxony, a municipality in the district of Torgau-Oschatz in Saxony, Germany
- Arzberg, Styria, a municipality in Styria, Austria
- Arzberg (Altmühltal), a mountain of Bavaria, Germany
- Arzberg porcelain, a manufacturer of porcelain, originally located in Arzberg, Bavaria
