= Freihausen =

- Ortsteil of Seubersdorf i.d.OPf.
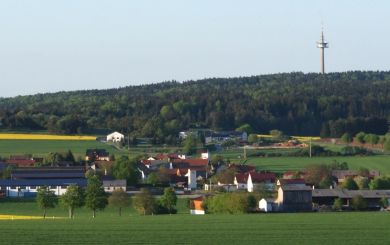
- Interactive map of Freihausen
- Location within Germany Location within Bavaria
- Coordinates: 49°8′47″N 11°33′34″E
- Country: Germany
- State: Bavaria
- Admin. region: Upper Palatinate
- District: Neumarkt in der Oberpfalz
- Municipality: Seubersdorf i.d.OPf.
- First mentioned: 1326
- Elevation: 497 m (1,631 ft)

Population
  - Total: 230
- Time zone: UTC+01:00 (CET)
  - Summer (DST): UTC+02:00 (CEST)
- Postal codes: 92358
- Dialling codes: 09497
- Vehicle registration: NM

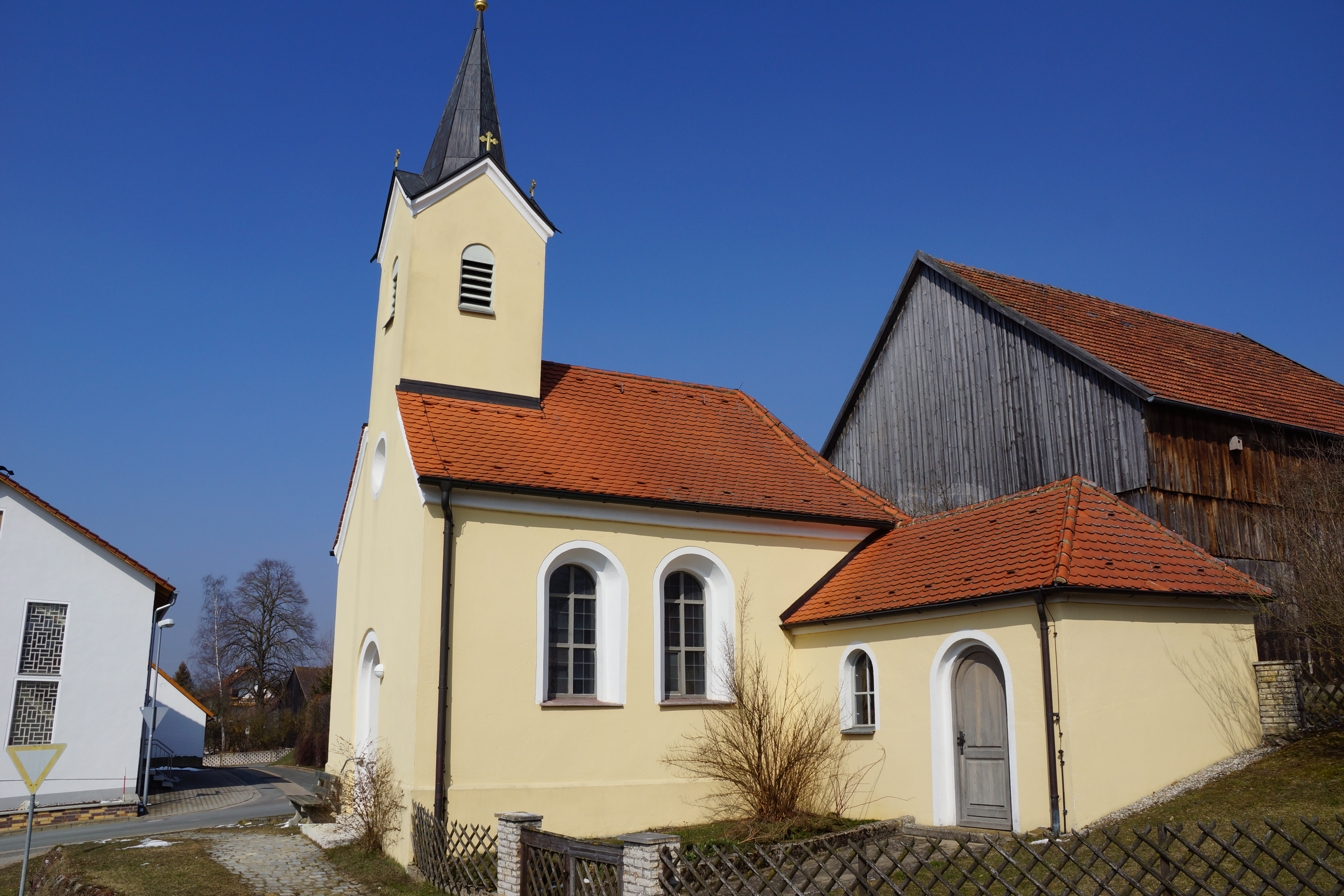
Freihausen - Chapel

Freihausen is a small village in the municipality of Seubersdorf in the German state of Bavaria. It is in the Upper Palatinate, in the Neumarkt district. It has a total population of 230 people.

== Geography ==
The village lies about 19 kilometers south-east from Neumarkt, on the Franconian Jura. The Wissinger Laber arises south-east from Freihausen.

== Climate ==
The climate in Freihausen is categorized in the Köppen climate classification as Dfb (humid continental). The average temperature of 7.7 °C is slightly below the German average (7.8 °C), the average precipitation of 735 mm per year above the German average (approximately 700 mm).
