= Waldkirchen (disambiguation) =

Waldkirchen is a town in the district of Freyung-Grafenau, Bavaria, Germany.

Waldkirchen may also refer to:

- Waldkirchen (Petersberg), a village in the district of Neumarkt, Bavaria, Germany
- Waldkirchen, Saxony, a village in the district of Mittlerer Erzgebirgskreis, Saxony, Germany
- Waldkirchen am Wesen, a municipality in the district of Schärding, Upper Austria, Austria
- Waldkirchen an der Thaya, a municipality in the district of Waidhofen an der Thaya, Lower Austria, Austria
