= Waldkirchen (Petersberg) =

- Ortsteil of Seubersdorf i.d.OPf.
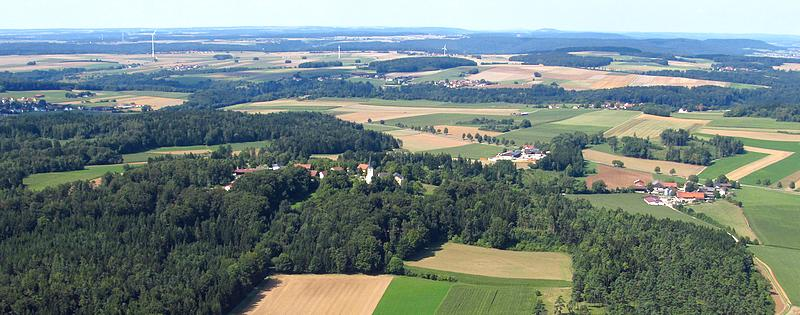
- Interactive map of Waldkirchen (Petersberg)
- Location within Germany Location within Bavaria
- Coordinates: 49°12′48″N 11°55′11″E
- Country: Germany
- State: Bavaria
- Admin. region: Upper Palatinate
- District: Neumarkt in der Oberpfalz
- Municipality: Seubersdorf i.d.OPf.
- First mentioned: 800
- Elevation: 571 m (1,873 ft)

Population
  - Total: 24
- Time zone: UTC+01:00 (CET)
  - Summer (DST): UTC+02:00 (CEST)
- Postal codes: 92358
- Dialling codes: 08460
- Vehicle registration: NM

Waldkirchen is a small village in the municipality of Seubersdorf in the German state of Bavaria. It is in the Upper Palatinate, in the Neumarkt district. It has a total population of about 25 people.

== Geography ==
The village lies about 21 kilometers south-east from Neumarkt, on the Franconian Jura.

=== Climate ===
The climate in Waldkirchen is categorized in the Köppen climate classification as Dfb (humid continental). The average temperature of 7.4 °C is slightly below the German average (7.8 °C), the average precipitation of 762 mm per year above the German average (approximately 700 mm).
