= Ludwig Canal =

Abandoned canal in Southern Germany

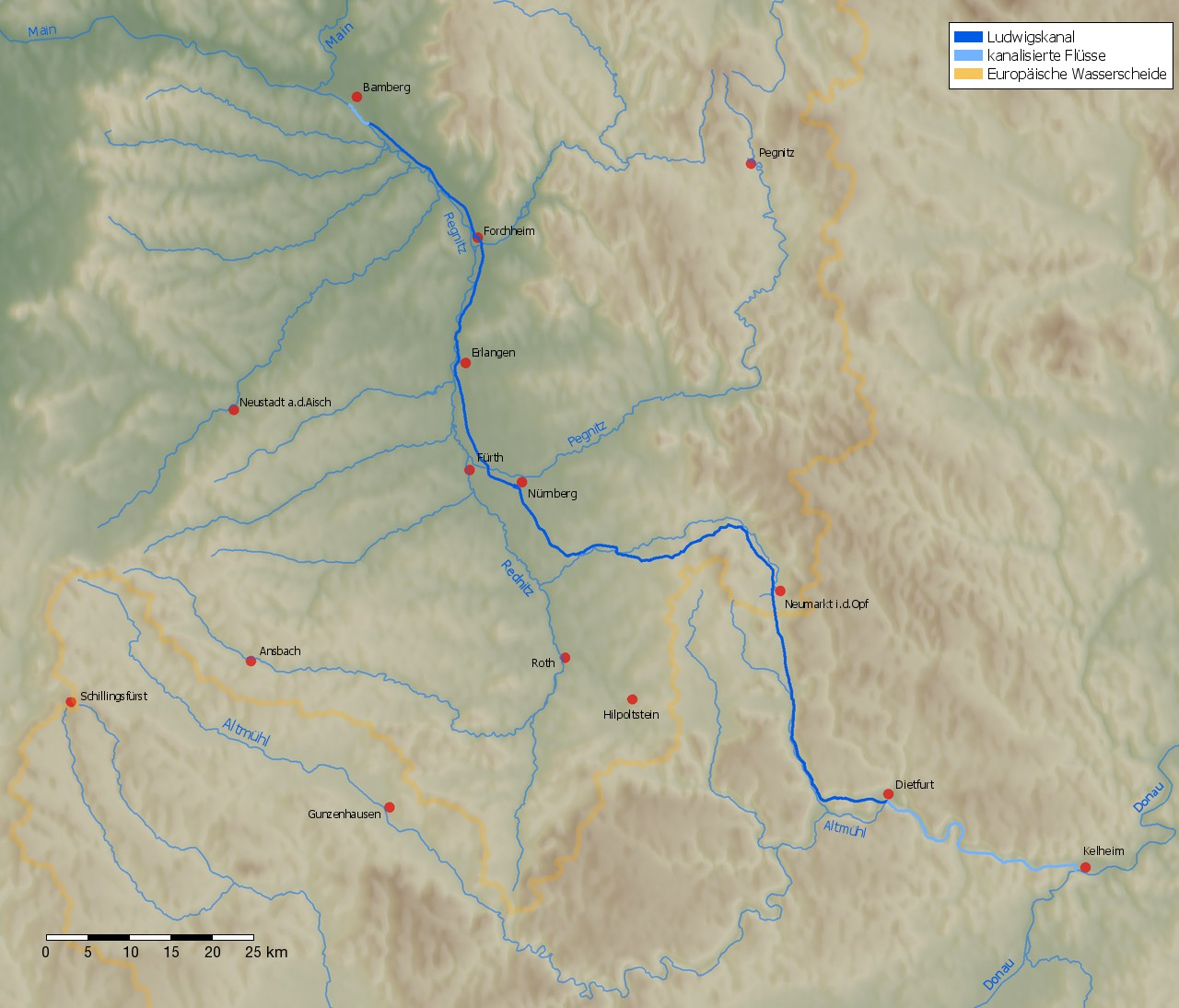
Map of the Ludwigskanal

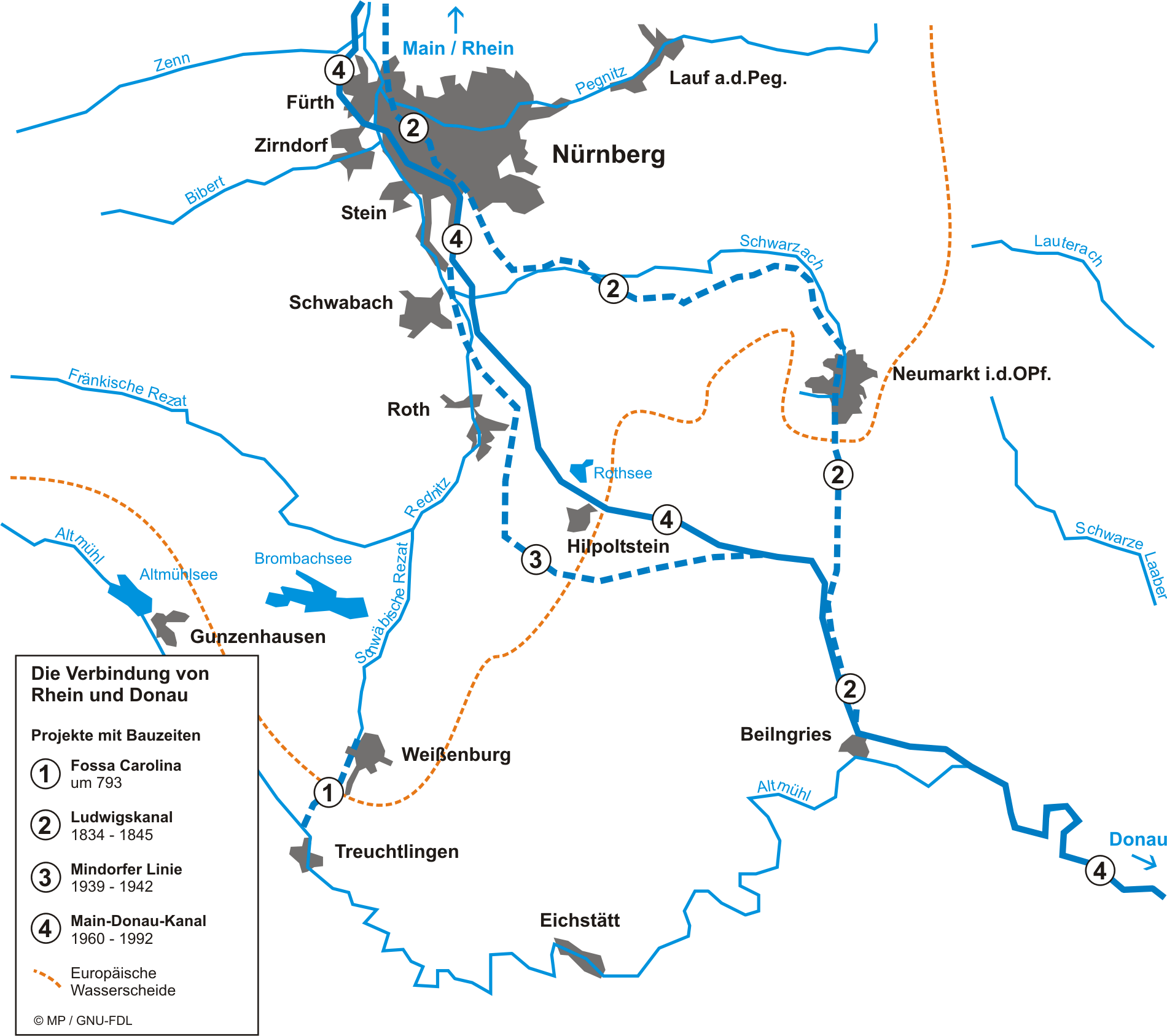
The various projects to link the Main and Danube

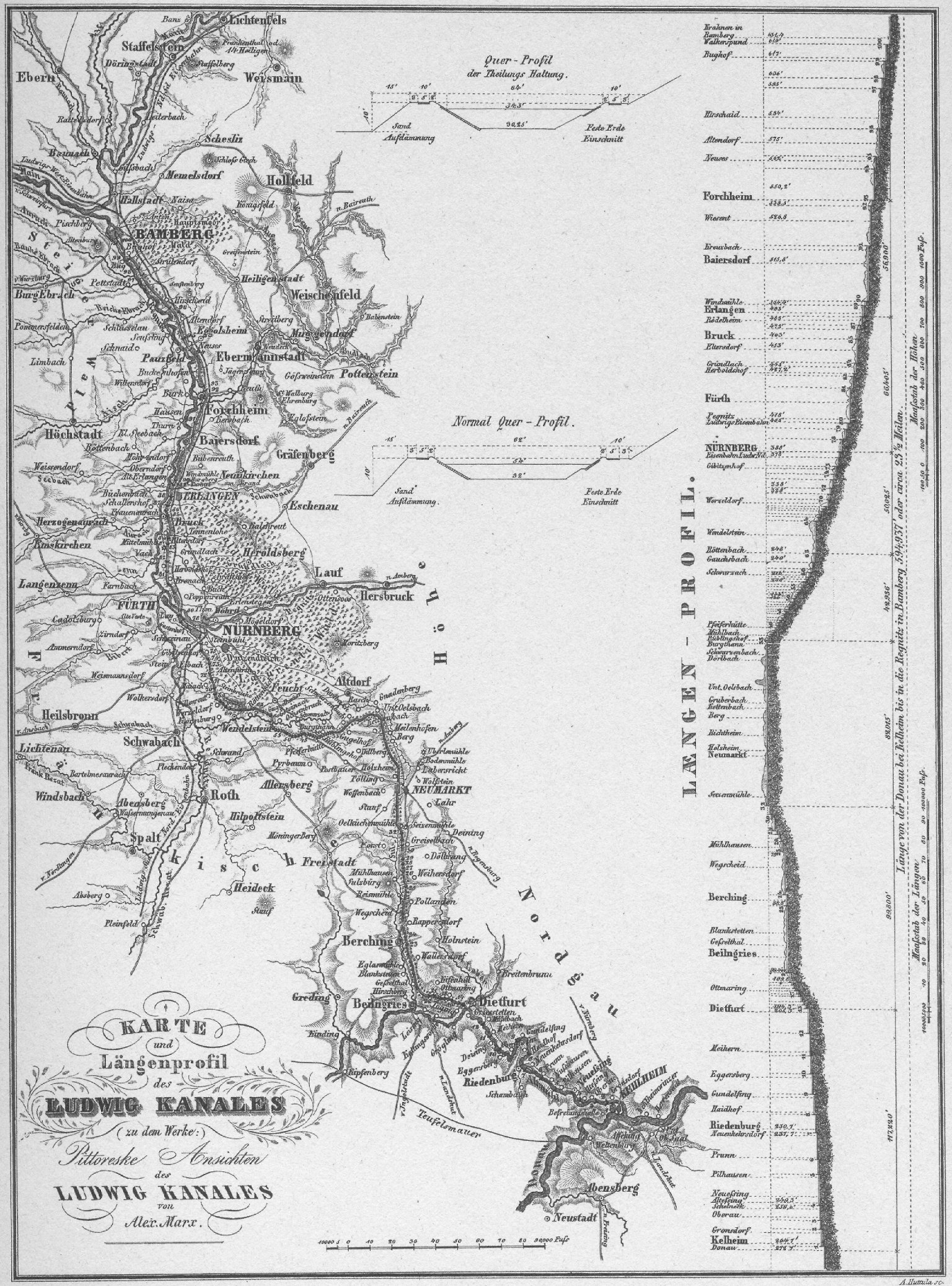
Karte und Längenprofil des Ludwig Kanales, Stahlstich (1845) von Alexander Marx

The Ludwig Canal (German: Ludwig-Donau-Main-Kanal or Ludwigskanal), is an abandoned canal in Southern Germany.

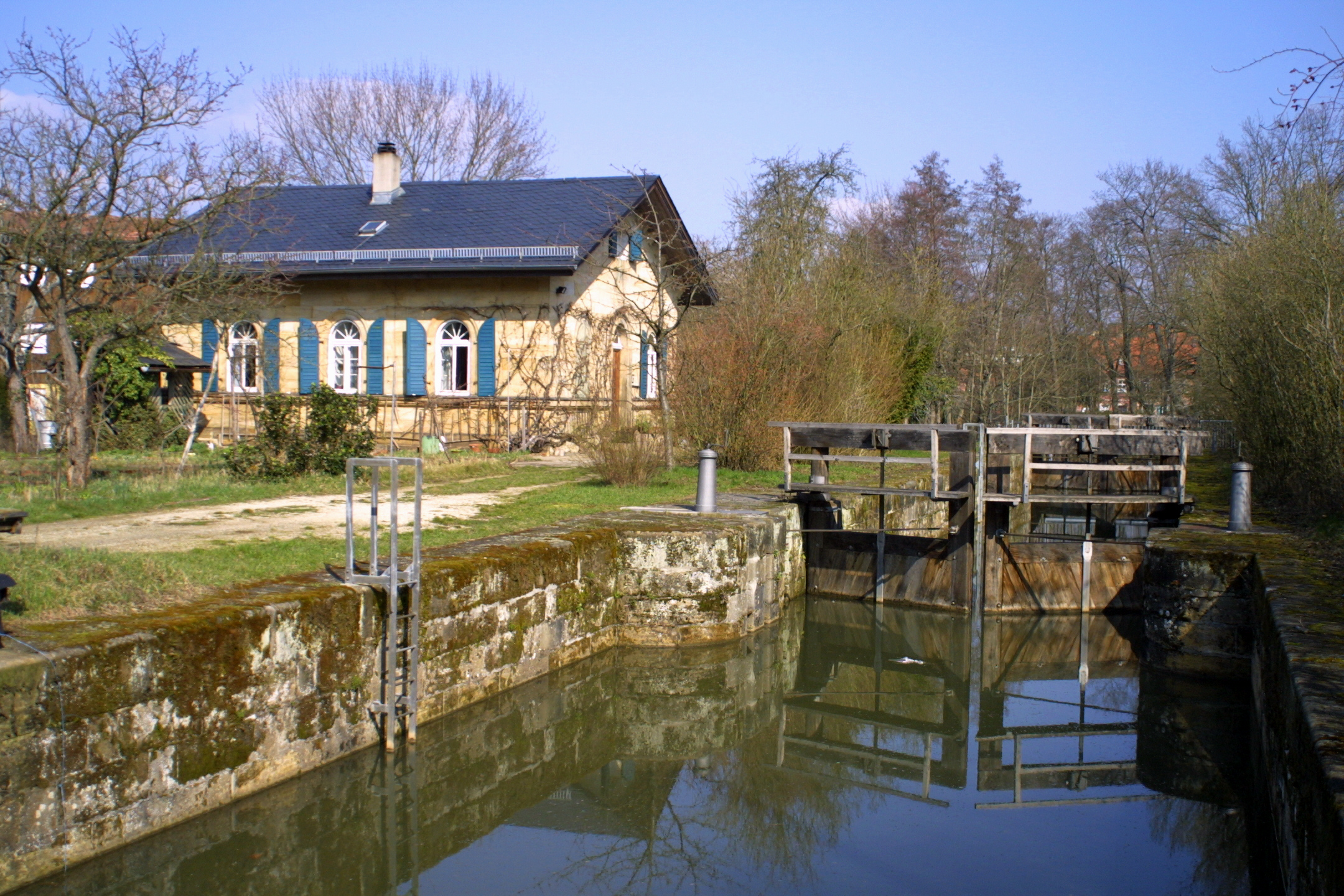
Lock 100 at Bamberg

== History ==
The canal linked the Danube River at Kelheim with the Main River at Bamberg, connecting the Danube basin with the Rhine basin. The first realisation of a dream to enable barges to navigate from the North Sea to the Black Sea, the Ludwig Canal proved to be unsustainable, and was eventually succeeded by a larger canal, over a century later.

Named after King Ludwig I of Bavaria, the canal was built between 1836 and 1846. Whereas the Main and the Danube were both broad canalised rivers, the Ludwig Canal was a narrow channel, with numerous locks, and a shortage of water supply to the summit level. The canal became a bottleneck, and the operation of the waterway soon became uneconomic. A further nail in the canal's coffin was competition from the rapidly developing railway network in the southern German countryside. Rather than repair the damage suffered during World War II, (the canal being close to the bombed city of Nuremberg), the canal was finally abandoned in 1950.

Construction of the Ludwig Canal's replacement, the much larger Rhine–Main–Danube Canal, was started in 1921, but not completed until 1992. The new canal is shorter and follows a route to the south and west of the earlier canal.

== The remnants of the Ludwig Canal ==
Today, there still exists between Nuremberg and Berching some 60 km (37 mi) of canal in good condition. Some of the locks still function, and part of the towpath has been converted to a cycle track. The old canal comes close to the new canal at Pollanten, and from there the two canals flow downstream in parallel, eventually meeting 5 km south of Berching.
