= Wiesinger =

Wiesinger is a surname of German origin. Notable people with the surname include:

- Herbert Wiesinger (born 1948), German former pair skater
- Kai Wiesinger (born 1966), German television and film actor
- Michael Wiesinger (born 1972), German football manager and former player
- Paula Wiesinger (later Steger; 1907–2001), pioneering Italian alpine skier and mountain climber
- Philipp Wiesinger (born 1994), Austrian footballer
- Steffen Wiesinger (born 1969), German fencer

== See also ==
- Wiesing
