= Wissing =

The surname Wissing may refer to:

- Dylan Wissing, American drummer
- Jens Wissing, German footballer
- Volker Wissing, (1970 -) German Politician
- Willem Wissing (1656–1687), Dutch portrait artist who worked in England

== See also ==
- Vizing
- Wissink
- Wiesing
