= Weiße Laber =

River in Germany

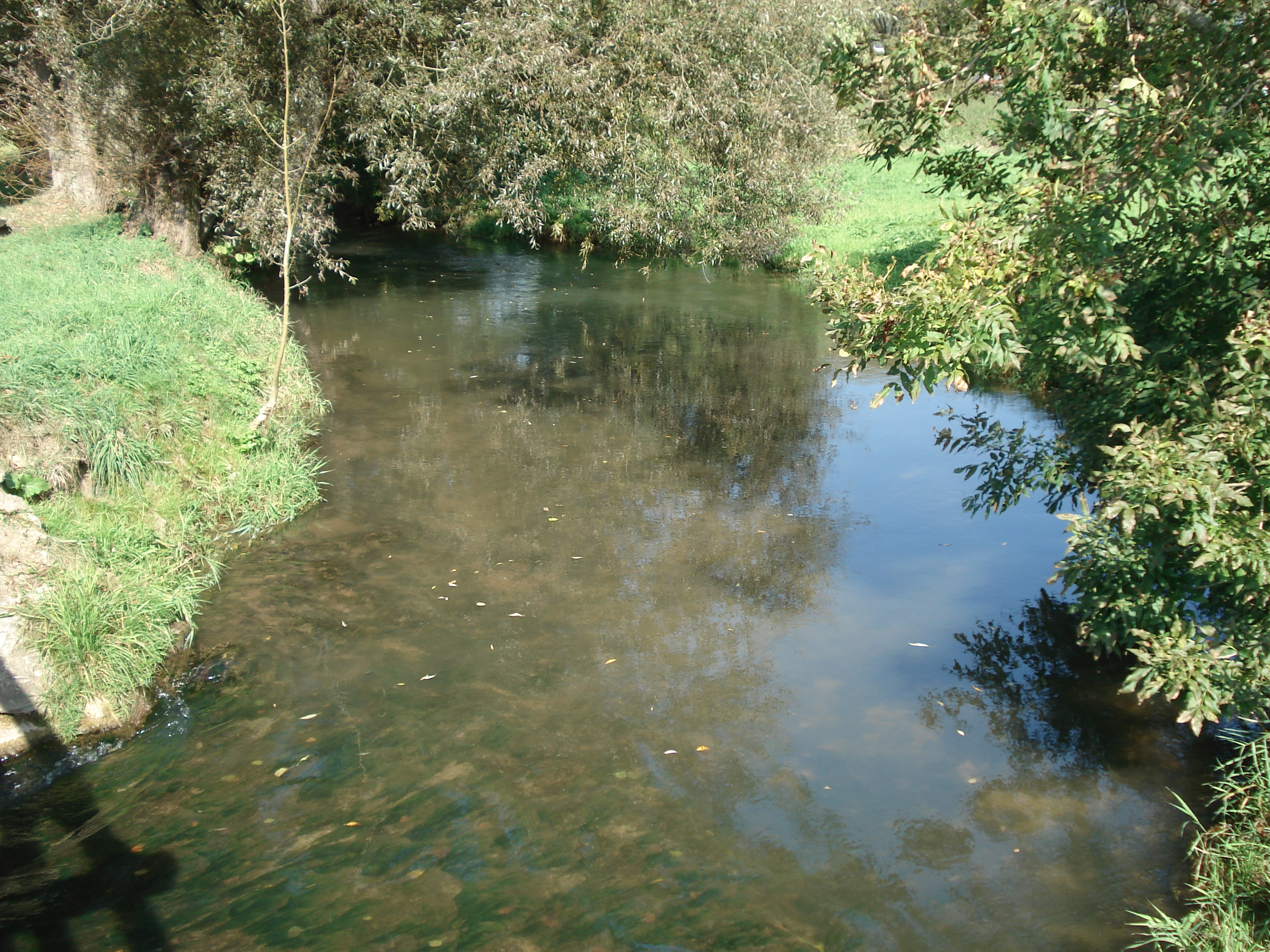
- The Weiße Laber in Dietfurt

Location
- Country: Germany
- State: Bavaria

Physical characteristics
- Mouth
  - location: Altmühl
  - coordinates: 49.0274°N 11.5808°E
- Length: 44.7 km (27.8 mi)
- Basin size: 357 km^{2} (138 sq mi)

Basin features
- Progression: Altmühl→ Danube→ Black Sea
- Tributaries
  - left: Breitenbrunner Laber

Weiße Laber (German pronunciation: [ˈvaɪsə ˈlaːbɐ], lit. 'White Laber'; in its upper course also: Unterbürger Laber) is a river in Bavaria, Germany. It flows into the Altmühl in Dietfurt.

== See also ==
- List of rivers of Bavaria
