= Wiesing =

- Municipality
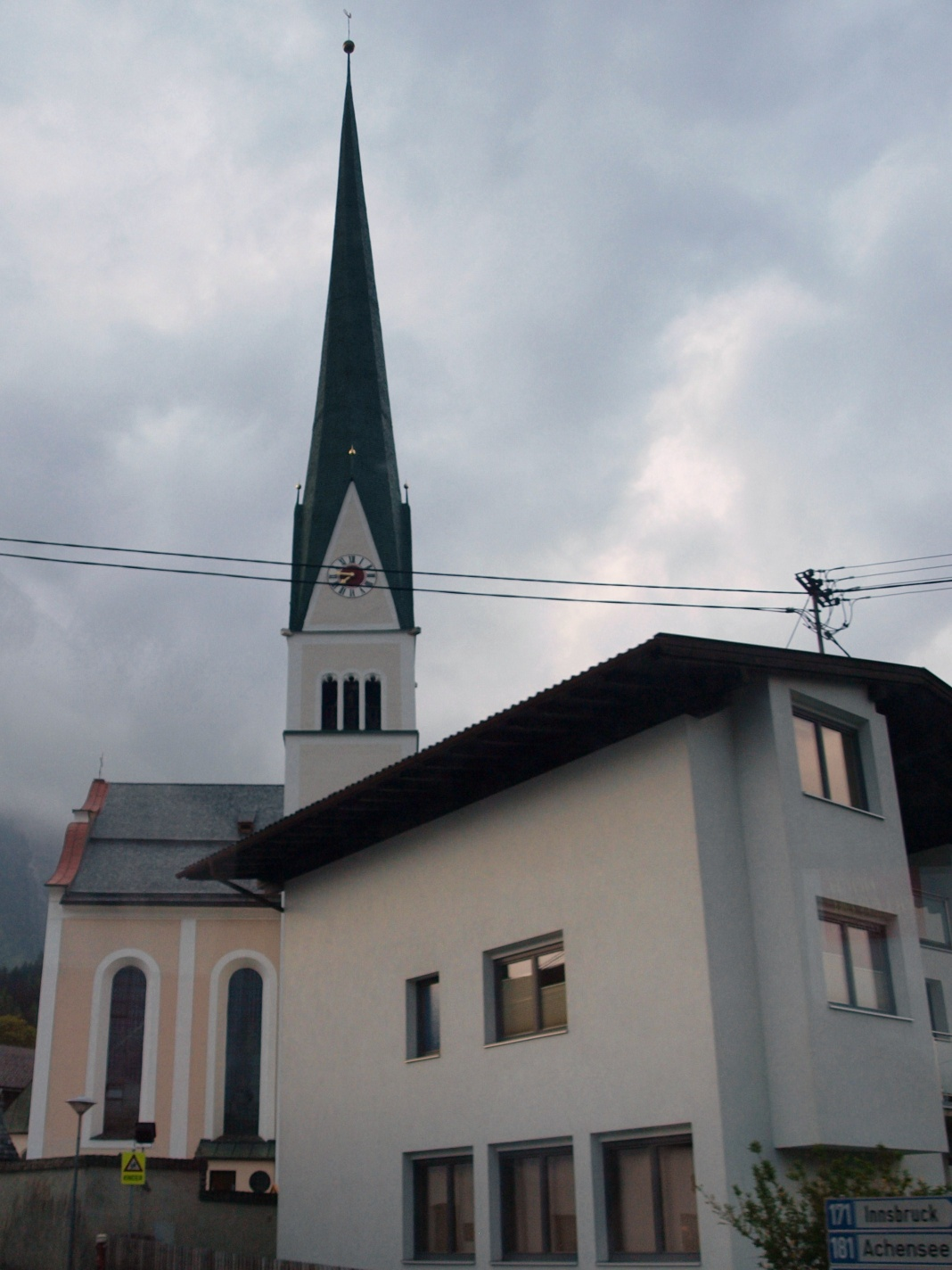

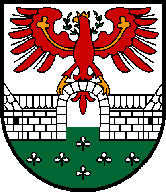
- Coat of arms

- Location within Austria
- Coordinates: 47°24′19″N 11°47′52″E
- Country: Austria
- State: Tyrol
- District: Schwaz

Government
  - Mayor: Alois Aschberger

Area
  - Total: 10.36 km^{2} (4.00 sq mi)
- Elevation: 566 m (1,857 ft)

Population (2021)
  - Total: 2,144
  - Density: 206.9/km^{2} (536.0/sq mi)
- Time zone: UTC+1 (CET)
  - Summer (DST): UTC+2 (CEST)
- Postal code: 6210
- Area code: 05244
- Vehicle registration: SZ
- Website: www.wiesing. tirol.gv.at

Wiesing is a municipality in the Schwaz district in the Austrian state of Tyrol.

== Geography ==
Wiesing lies in the lower Inn valley north of the Inn at the entrance to the Ziller valley.
