= Arzberg (Altmühl valley) =

Mountain in Germany

- Location within Bavaria

Highest point
- Elevation: 507.1 m (1,664 ft)
- Coordinates: 49°02′01″N 11°29′14″E

Geography
- Location: Bavaria, Germany

The Arzberg (German pronunciation: [ˈaʁtsbɛʁk]) is a hill in Bavaria, Germany. Parts of the mountain are found within a nature reserve with dedicated trails for hikers. The mountain is formed mostly of limestone, which fossils can be found from the Jurassic period.

== See also ==
- Altmühl Valley Nature Park
