= Seubersdorf =

Seubersdorf in der Oberpfalz
- Municipality
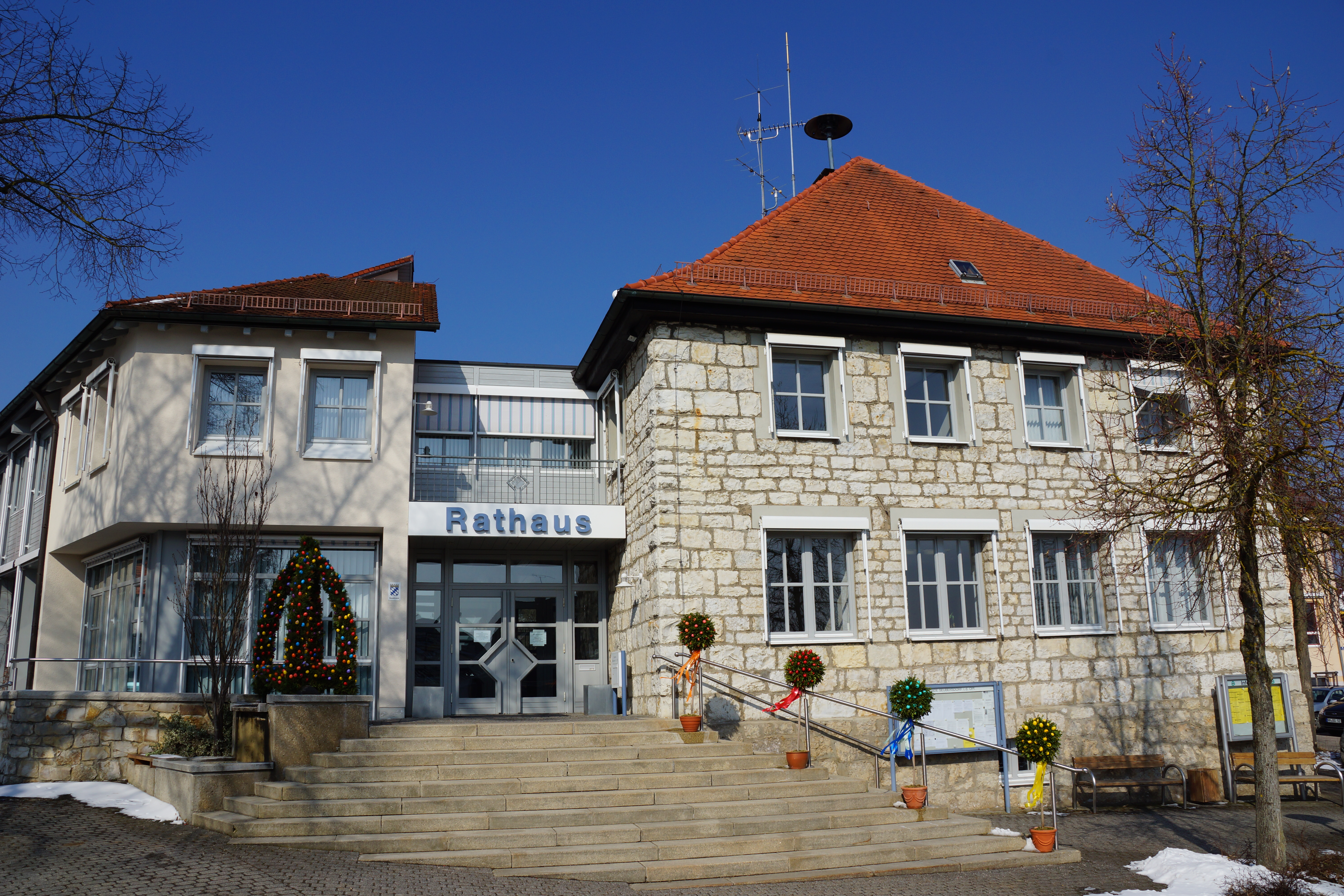
- Town hall

- Coat of arms

- Location of Seubersdorf in der Oberpfalz within Neumarkt in der Oberpfalz district
- Interactive map of Seubersdorf in der Oberpfalz
- Location within Germany Location within Bavaria
- Coordinates: 49°10′N 11°37′E
- Country: Germany
- State: Bavaria
- Admin. region: Oberpfalz
- District: Neumarkt in der Oberpfalz
- Subdivisions: 7 Ortsteile

Government
  - Mayor (2023–29): Andreas Steiner (SPD)

Area
  - Total: 68.29 km^{2} (26.37 sq mi)
- Elevation: 521 m (1,709 ft)

Population (2025-12-31)
  - Total: 5,270
  - Density: 77.2/km^{2} (200/sq mi)
- Time zone: UTC+01:00 (CET)
  - Summer (DST): UTC+02:00 (CEST)
- Postal codes: 92358
- Dialling codes: 09497
- Vehicle registration: NM
- Website: www.seubersdorf.de

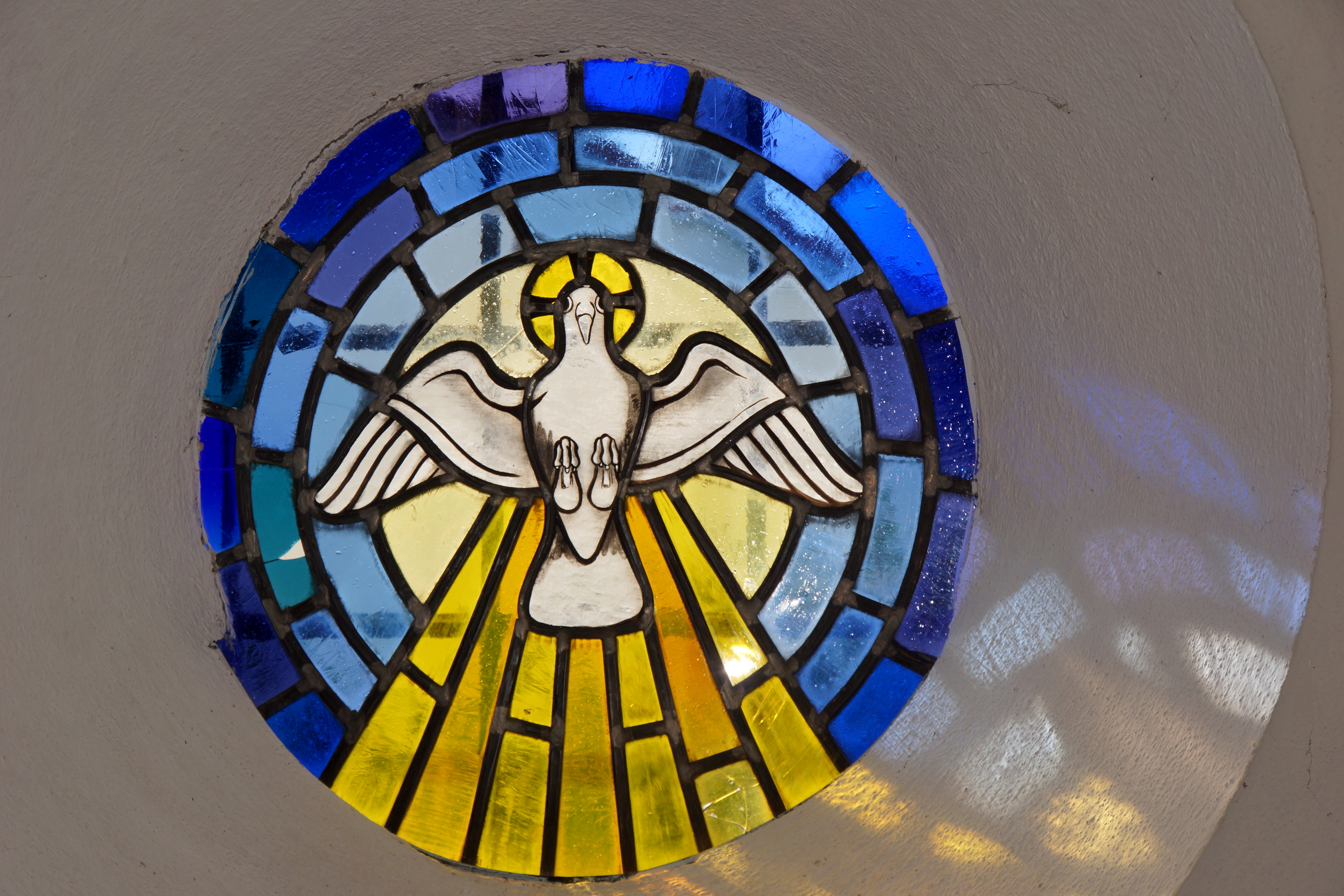
The Catholic parish church of the Assumption of Mary in Daßwang at Seubersdorf

Seubersdorf is a municipality in the district of Neumarkt in Bavaria in Germany.
