= Altmühl =

River in Bavaria, Germany

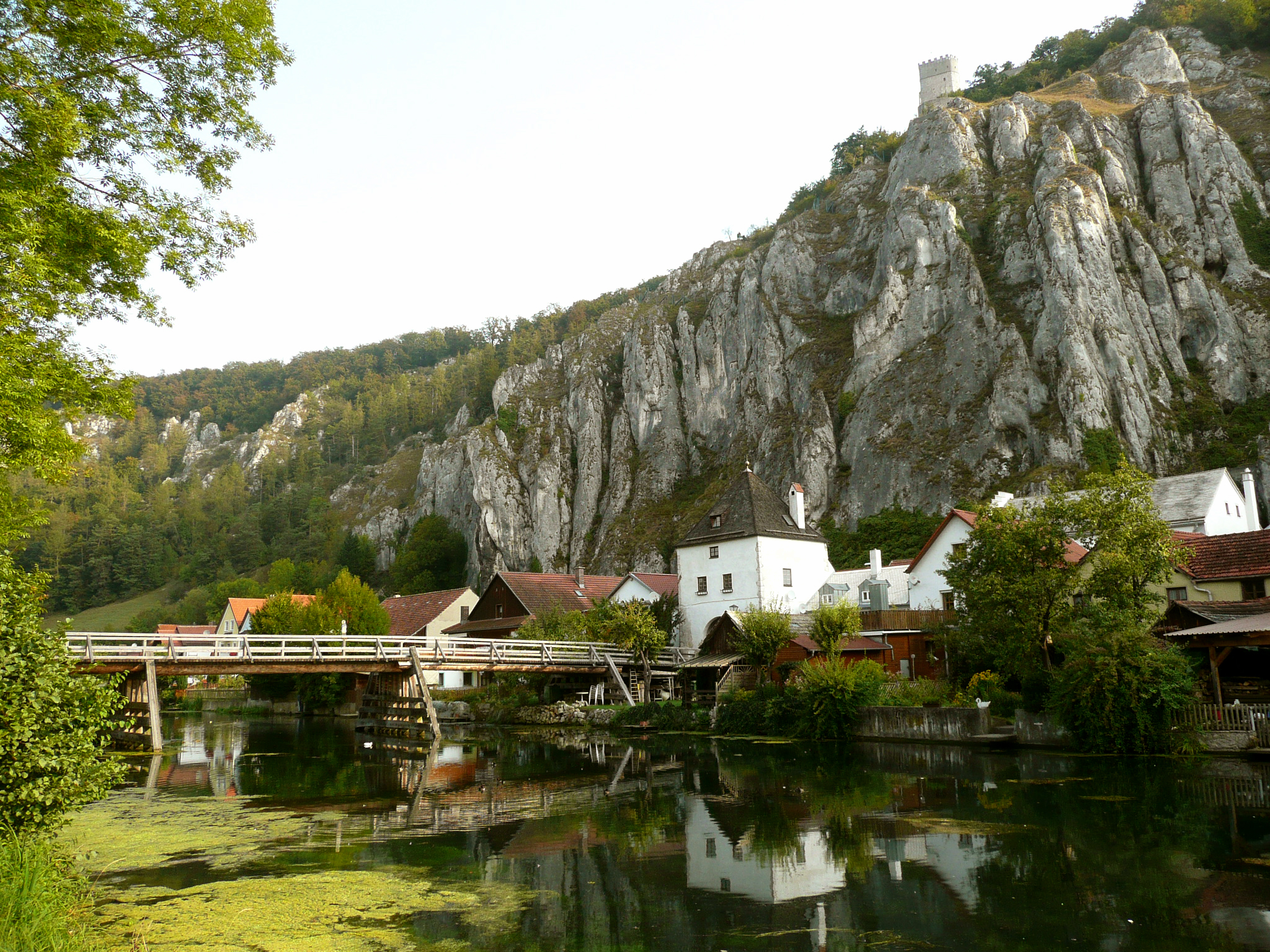
- Old Altmühl at Essing, between Dietfurt and Kelheim

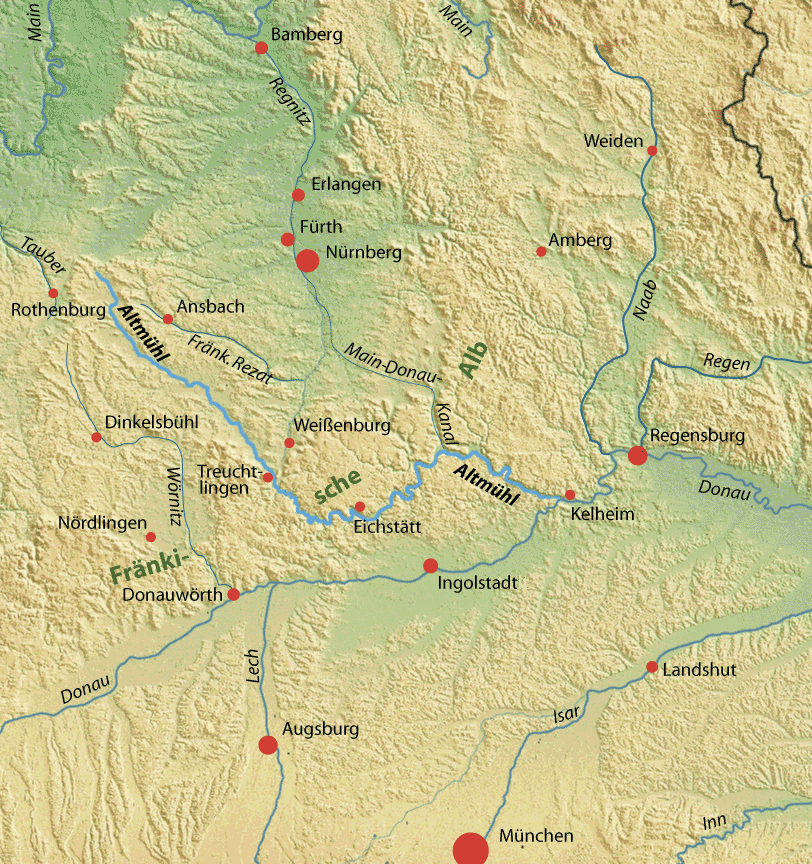
- Map with the Altmühl highlighted

Location
- Country: Germany

Physical characteristics
- Source
  - location: Middle Franconia
- Mouth
  - location: Danube at Kelheim
  - coordinates: 48°54′37″N 11°54′25″E
- Length: 226.9 km (141.0 mi)
- Basin size: 3,258 km^{2} (1,258 sq mi)
- Discharge
  - average: 24.3 m^{3}/s (860 cu ft/s)

Basin features
- Progression: Danube→ Black Sea

The Altmühl (German pronunciation: [ˈaltˌmyːl], Latin: Alchmona, Alcmana, Almonus) is a river in Bavaria, Germany. It is a left tributary of the river Danube and is approximately 230 kilometers (140 mi) long. Much of the river is contained within the Altmühl Valley Nature Park.

== Course ==
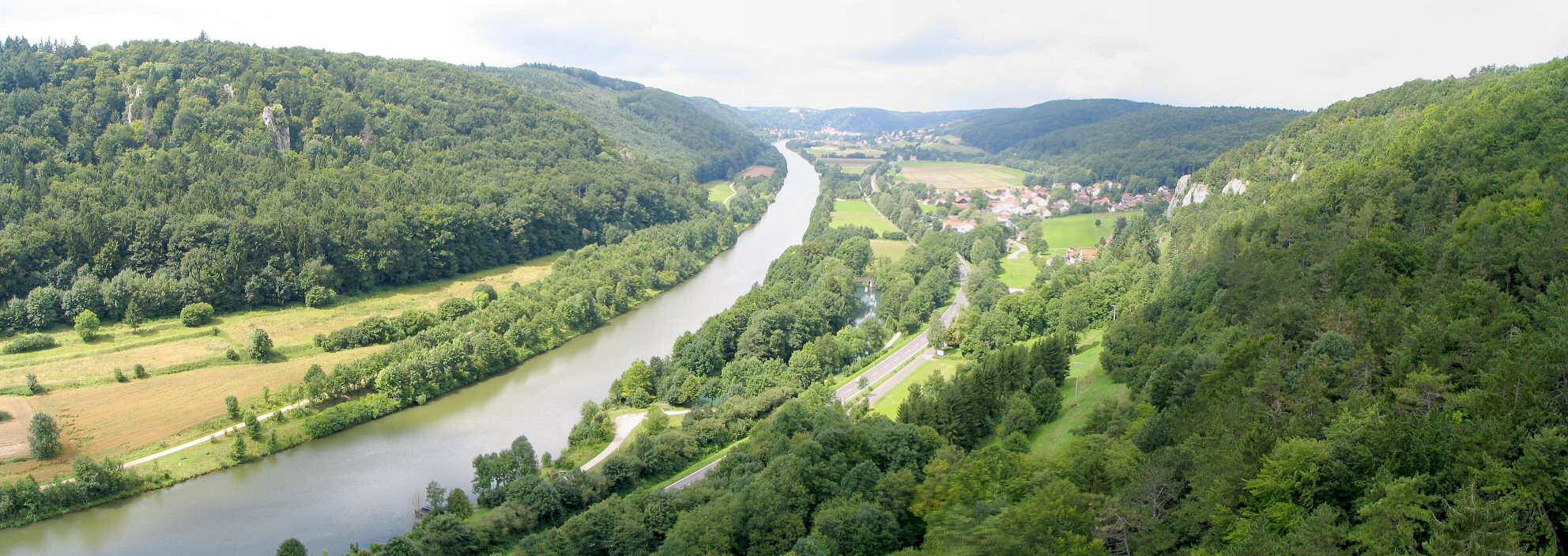
The Altmühl as part of the Main–Danube Canal near Riedenburg

The source of the Altmühl is close to the town of Ansbach. From here the river runs southeastwards as a narrow brook to enter the Altmühlsee (a lake) north of Gunzenhausen. After leaving Gunzenhausen, the river moves in a broad curve through the Franconian Jura. It enters the Altmühl Valley Nature Park (Naturpark Altmühltal), which is known for its natural environment: The meanders of the Altmühl river have cut deep gorges into the mountains of the Franconian Jura.

The Altmühl passes the towns of Treuchtlingen, Eichstätt and Beilngries.

Downstream of Dietfurt, the riverbed was straightened and integrated into a canal connecting the river Main and the river Danube (the Rhine–Main–Danube Canal). In spite of protests by conservationists, the canal was opened in 1992 and has changed much of the eastern Altmühl valley.

The Altmühl finally flows into the Danube in Kelheim.

== See also ==
- Altmühltal
- Arzberg (Altmühl valley)
- List of rivers of Bavaria
