= Breitenbrunn, Upper Palatinate =

Breitenbrunn
- Municipality
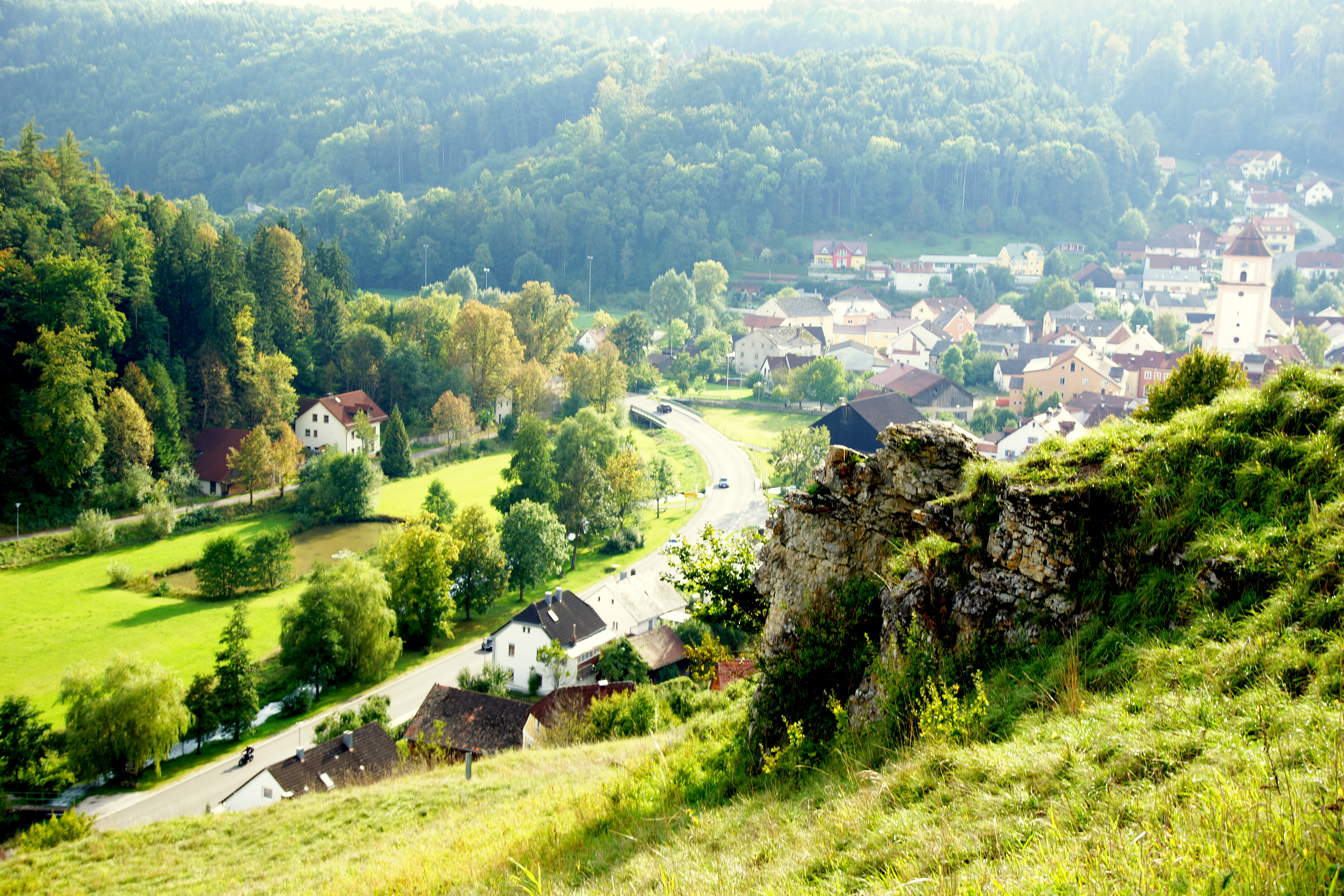
- Breitenbrunn in 2013

- Coat of arms

- Location of Breitenbrunn within Neumarkt in der Oberpfalz district
- Interactive map of Breitenbrunn
- Location within Germany Location within Bavaria
- Coordinates: 49°05′01″N 11°37′20″E
- Country: Germany
- State: Bavaria
- Admin. region: Oberpfalz
- District: Neumarkt in der Oberpfalz
- Subdivisions: 8 Ortsteile

Government
  - Mayor (2020–26): Johann Lanzhammer (FW)

Area
  - Total: 70.78 km^{2} (27.33 sq mi)
- Elevation: 401 m (1,316 ft)

Population (2025-12-31)
  - Total: 3,687
  - Density: 52.09/km^{2} (134.9/sq mi)
- Time zone: UTC+01:00 (CET)
  - Summer (DST): UTC+02:00 (CEST)
- Postal codes: 92363
- Dialling codes: 09495
- Vehicle registration: NM
- Website: www.breitenbrunn.de

Breitenbrunn (German pronunciation: [ˈbʁaɪtn̩ˌbʁʊn]) is a municipality in the district of Neumarkt in Bavaria in Germany.

== Mayors ==
- since 2014: Johann Lanzhammer (FW)
- 2008-2014: Josef Kellermeier (CSU)
- 1984-2008: Josef Köstler

== Notable people ==
- The Bavarian war minister Anton Joseph Freiherr von Gumppenberg (1787-1855) was born in Breitenbrunn.

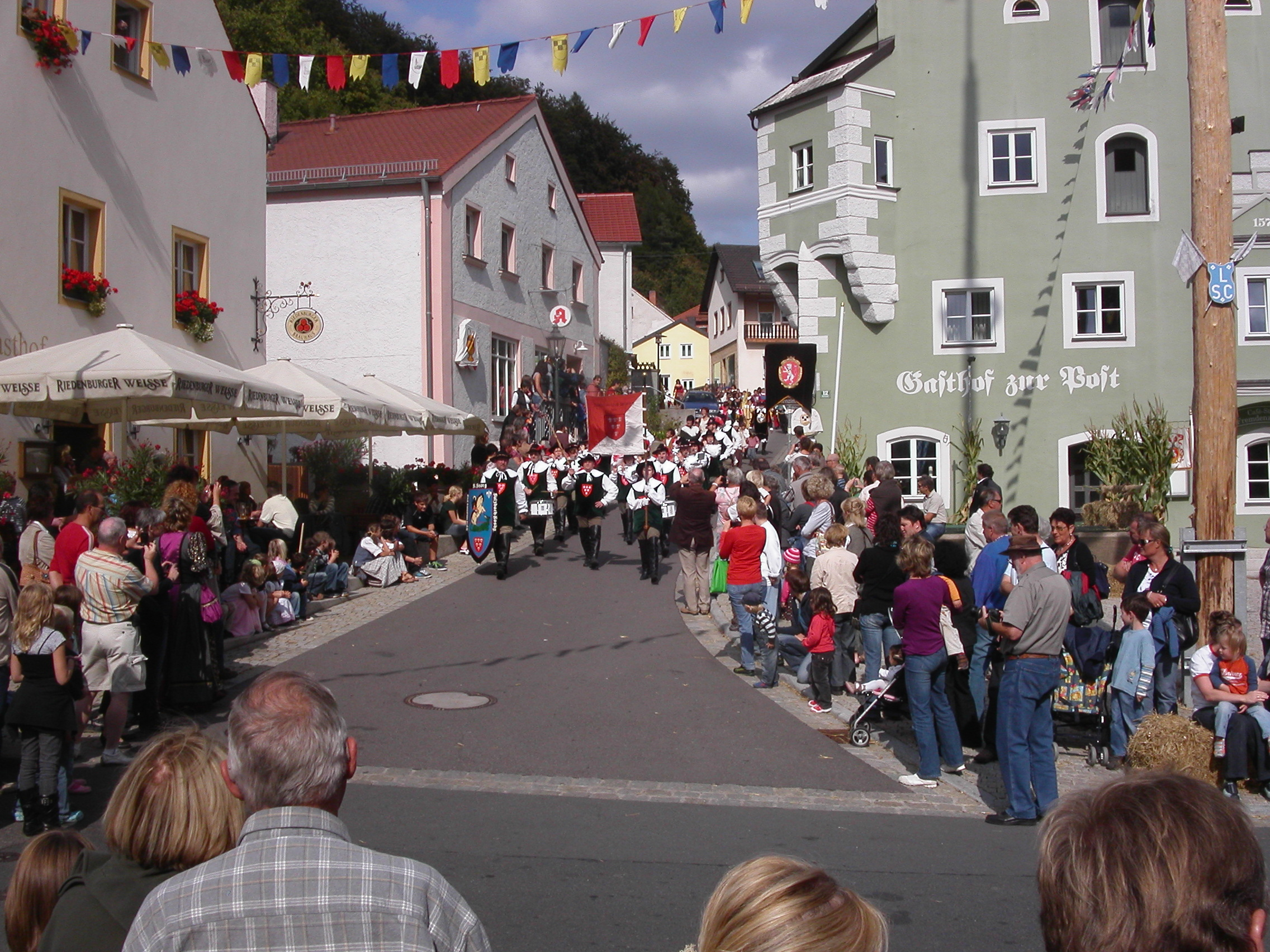
Tillyfest in Breitenbrunn in 2009
