= Dietfurt =

Dietfurt an der Altmühl
- Town
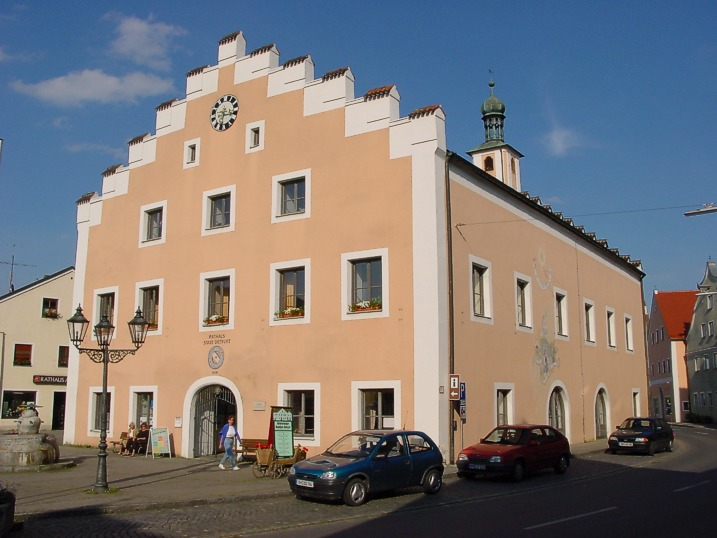
- Town hall

- Coat of arms

- Location of Dietfurt an der Altmühl within Neumarkt in der Oberpfalz district
- Interactive map of Dietfurt an der Altmühl
- Location within Germany Location within Bavaria
- Coordinates: 49°2′N 11°35′E
- Country: Germany
- State: Bavaria
- Admin. region: Oberpfalz
- District: Neumarkt in der Oberpfalz

Government
  - Mayor (2020–26): Bernd Mayr

Area
  - Total: 78.71 km^{2} (30.39 sq mi)
- Elevation: 365 m (1,198 ft)

Population (2025-12-31)
  - Total: 6,448
  - Density: 81.92/km^{2} (212.2/sq mi)
- Time zone: UTC+01:00 (CET)
  - Summer (DST): UTC+02:00 (CEST)
- Postal codes: 92345
- Dialling codes: 08464
- Vehicle registration: NM
- Website: www.dietfurt.de

Dietfurt an der Altmühl (officially Dietfurt a.d. Altmühl, German pronunciation: [ˈdiːtˌfʊʁt ʔan deːɐ̯ ˈʔaltˌmyːl], lit. 'Dietfurt on the Altmühl'), commonly known as Dietfurt, is a town in the district of Neumarkt in Bavaria, Germany. The town is situated on the river Altmühl, and is 38 km west of Regensburg, 30 km north of Ingolstadt, and is located 364 meters above sea level.

== Overview ==
Dietfurt is known as the "Bavarian China" (German: Bayerisch China, simplified Chinese: 巴伐利亚的中国; traditional Chinese: 巴伐利亞的中國; pinyin: Bāfálìyà de Zhōngguó), Chinese culture is the theme adopted for Carnival in Dietfurt, and the city promotes other Chinese cultural activities such as courses in Qigong.

== Mayor ==
The mayor of Dietfurt is Bernd Mayr, elected in March 2020.

== Notable people ==
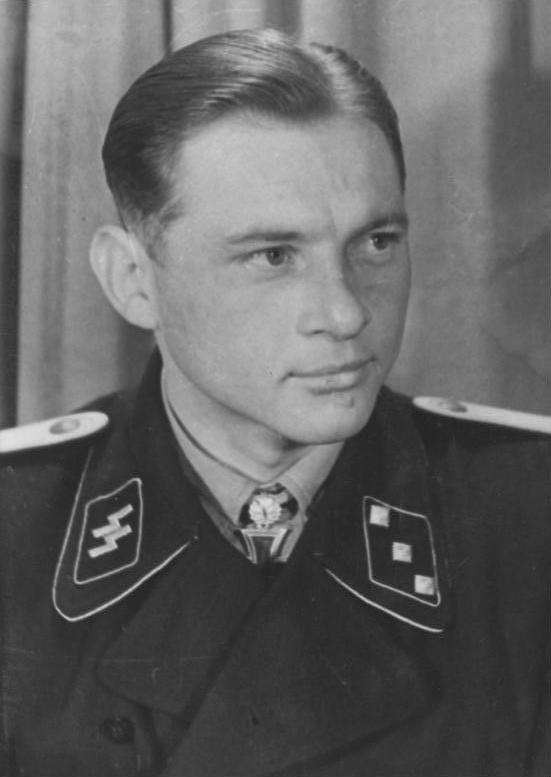
Michael Wittmann

- Argula von Grumbach, (1492–1568) Protestant publicist and reformer, lived and worked in Dietfurt from 1516 onwards
- Michael Wittmann (1914–1944), German Panzer commander and panzer ace of the Waffen-SS, born in Vogelthal district
