= Geisenbrunn station =

Railway station in Bavaria, Germany

Geisenbrunn

General information
- Location: Angerfeldstraße/Erlenweg; 82205 Gilching; Bavaria; Germany
- Coordinates: 48.1091°N 11.3253°E
- Elevation: 572 m (1,877 ft)
- System: Hp
- Owner: DB Netz
- Operator: DB Station&Service
- Lines: Munich–Herrsching railway (KBS 999.8)
- Platforms: 2 side platforms
- Tracks: 2
- Train operators: S-Bahn München

Construction
- Parking: yes
- Cycle facilities: yes
- Accessible: partly

Other information
- Station code: 2040
- DS100 code: MGIB
- IBNR: 8002210
- Category: 5
- Fare zone: : 1 and 2
- Website: www.bahnhof.de

History
- Opened: 1 July 1903; 123 years ago

Services
Preceding station	Munich S-Bahn	Following station
Gilching-Argelsried towards Weßling	S5	Germering-Unterpfaffenhofen towards Kreuzstraße
Gilching-Argelsried towards Herrsching	S8	Germering-Unterpfaffenhofen towards Flughafen
Location
- Location within Bavaria Location within Germany Location within Europe

Geisenbrunn station is a railway station in the municipality of Geisenbrunn, located in the Starnberg district in Upper Bavaria, Germany.

== History ==
The station is located to the north of the Gilching district of Geisenbrunn. The unoccupied Haltepunkt initially only had a bulk platform and a milk loading ramp on the track. In 1910, the Bayerische Staatseisenbahnen (Bavarian State Railways) set up a rail siding secured by a covering agency to form a clay works, which was dismantled before 1938. Due to the increasing number of passengers, the municipality of Argelsried erected a single-storey wooden hipped roof building around 1920 with a service room and a waiting room in which a railway agent was stationed to sell tickets. In 1962, Deutsche Bundesbahn stopped selling tickets again and the station was no longer occupied. With the double-track extension of the line, Deutsche Bundesbahn put two new side platforms into operation at Geisenbrunn in 1986.
