= Harthaus station =

Railway station in Bavaria, Germany

Harthaus
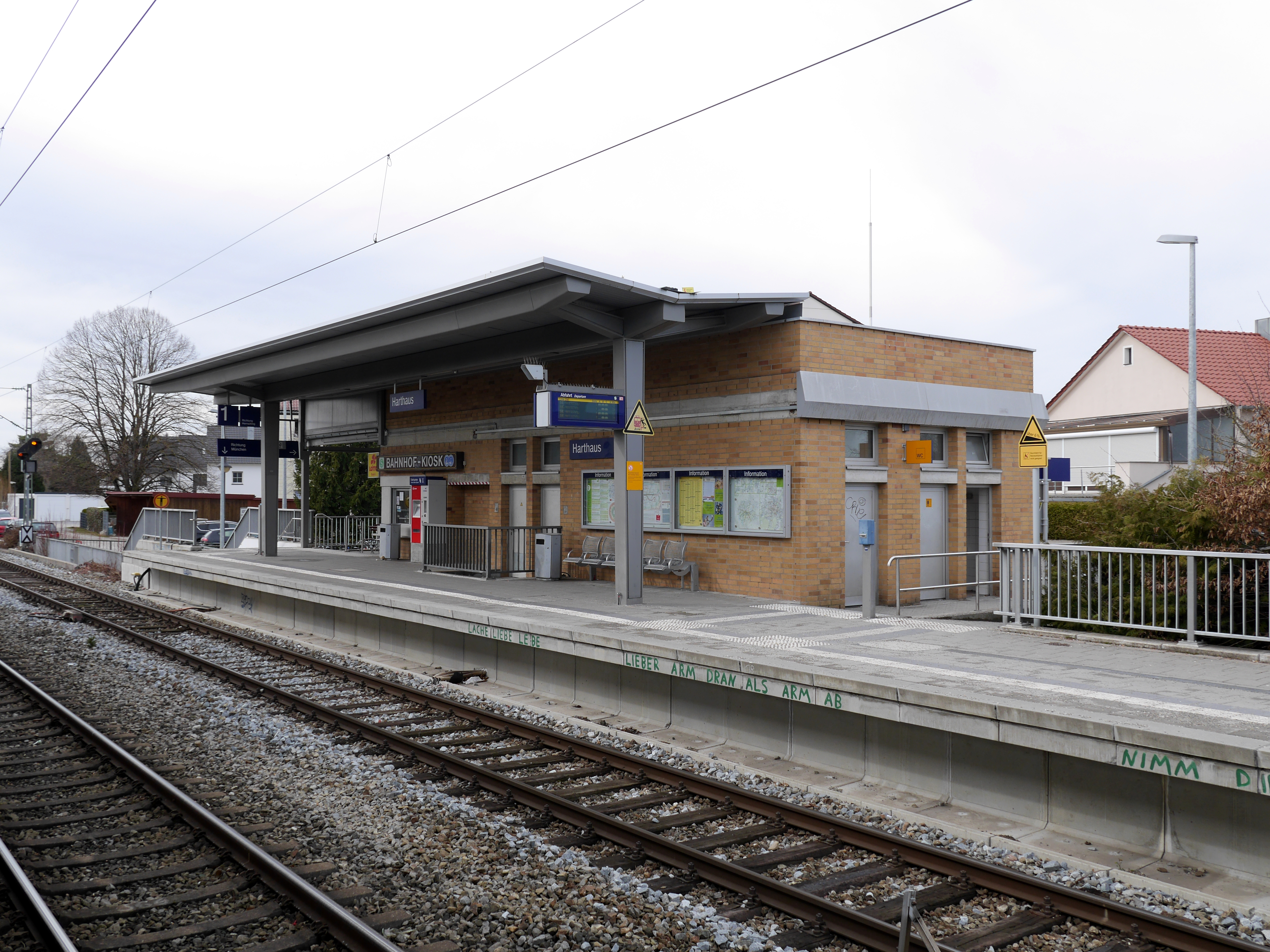
- 2019

General information
- Location: Sankt-Cäcilia-Straße/Hubertusstraße; 82110 Germering; Bavaria; Germany
- Coordinates: 48.1331°N 11.3868°E
- System: Hp
- Owner: Deutsche Bahn
- Operator: DB Netz; DB Station&Service
- Lines: Munich–Herrsching railway (KBS 999.8)
- Platforms: 2 side platforms
- Tracks: 2
- Train operators: S-Bahn München
- Connections: 851, 859, 8500

Construction
- Parking: yes
- Cycle facilities: yes
- Accessible: yes

Other information
- Station code: 2570
- DS100 code: MHHS
- IBNR: 8002610
- Category: 5
- Fare zone: : M and 1
- Website: www.bahnhof.de

History
- Opened: 5 October 1947; 78 years ago

Services
Preceding station	Munich S-Bahn	Following station
Germering-Unterpfaffenhofen towards Weßling	S5	Munich-Freiham towards Kreuzstraße
Germering-Unterpfaffenhofen towards Herrsching	S8	Munich-Freiham towards Flughafen
Location
- Location within Bavaria Location within Germany Location within Europe

Harthaus station is a railway station in the municipality of Germering, located in the Fürstenfeldbruck district in Upper Bavaria, Germany.
