= Germering-Unterpfaffenhofen station =

Railway station in Bavaria, Germany

Germering-Unterpfaffenhofen
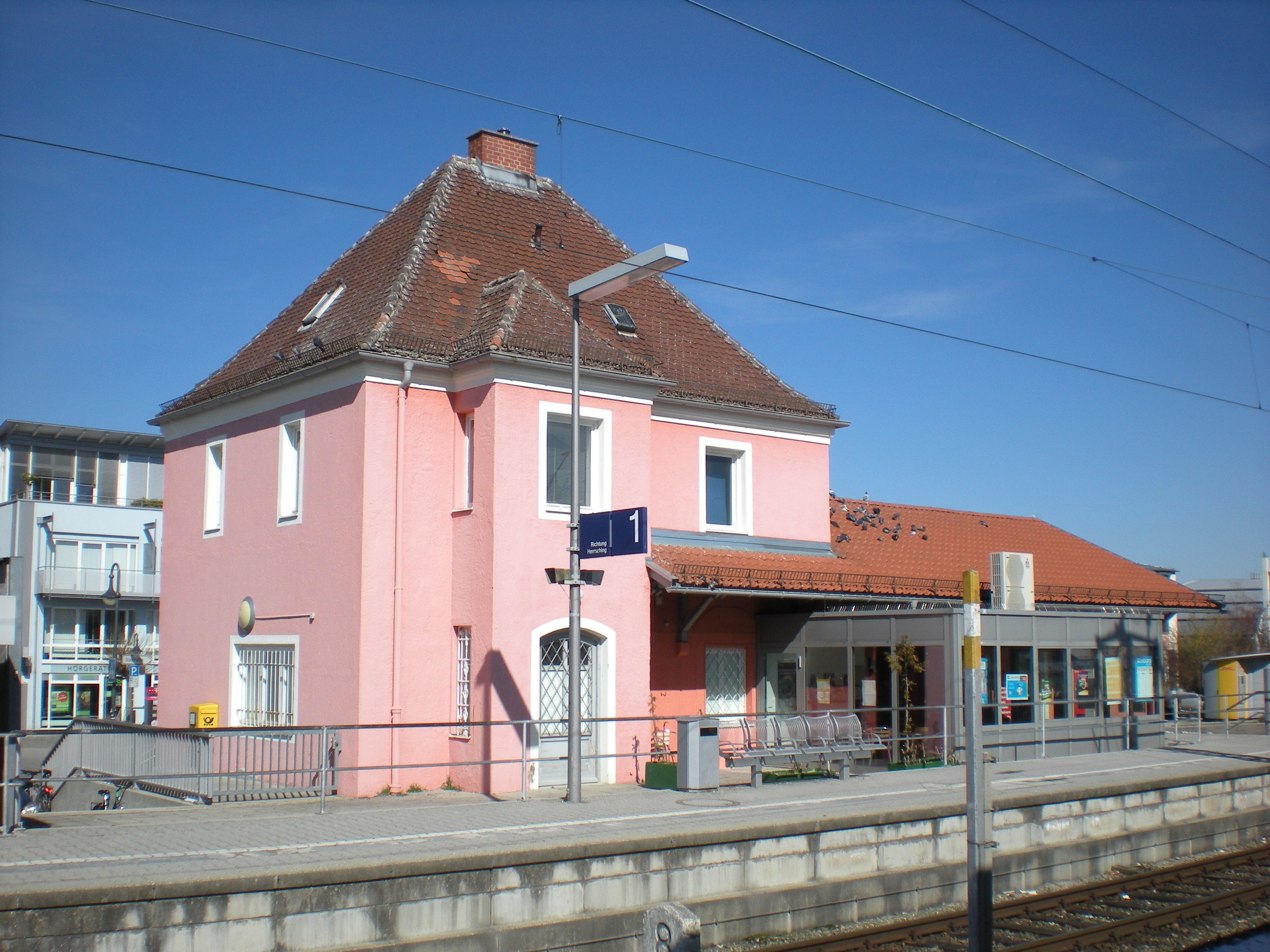
- 2015

General information
- Location: Bahnhofsplatz 1; 82110 Germering; Bavaria; Germany
- Coordinates: 48.1291°N 11.3640°E
- Elevation: 540 m (1,770 ft)
- System: Bf
- Owner: Deutsche Bahn
- Operator: DB Netz; DB Station&Service
- Lines: Munich–Herrsching railway (KBS 999.8)
- Platforms: 1 island platform 1 side platform
- Tracks: 3
- Train operators: S-Bahn München
- Connections: 157, 260, 851, 852, 853, 856, 857, 858, 859, 8500, X208, X850

Construction
- Parking: yes
- Cycle facilities: yes
- Accessible: yes

Other information
- Station code: 2091
- DS100 code: MUG
- IBNR: 8006006
- Category: 3
- Fare zone: : 1
- Website: www.bahnhof.de

History
- Opened: 1 July 1903; 123 years ago

Services
Preceding station	Munich S-Bahn	Following station
Geisenbrunn towards Weßling	S5	Harthaus towards Kreuzstraße
Geisenbrunn towards Herrsching	S8	Harthaus towards Flughafen
Location
- Location within Bavaria Location within Germany Location within Europe

Germering-Unterpfaffenhofen station is a railway station in the municipality of Germering, located in the Fürstenfeldbruck district in Upper Bavaria, Germany.
