= Gilching-Argelsried station =

Railway station in Bavaria, Germany

Gilching-Argelsried
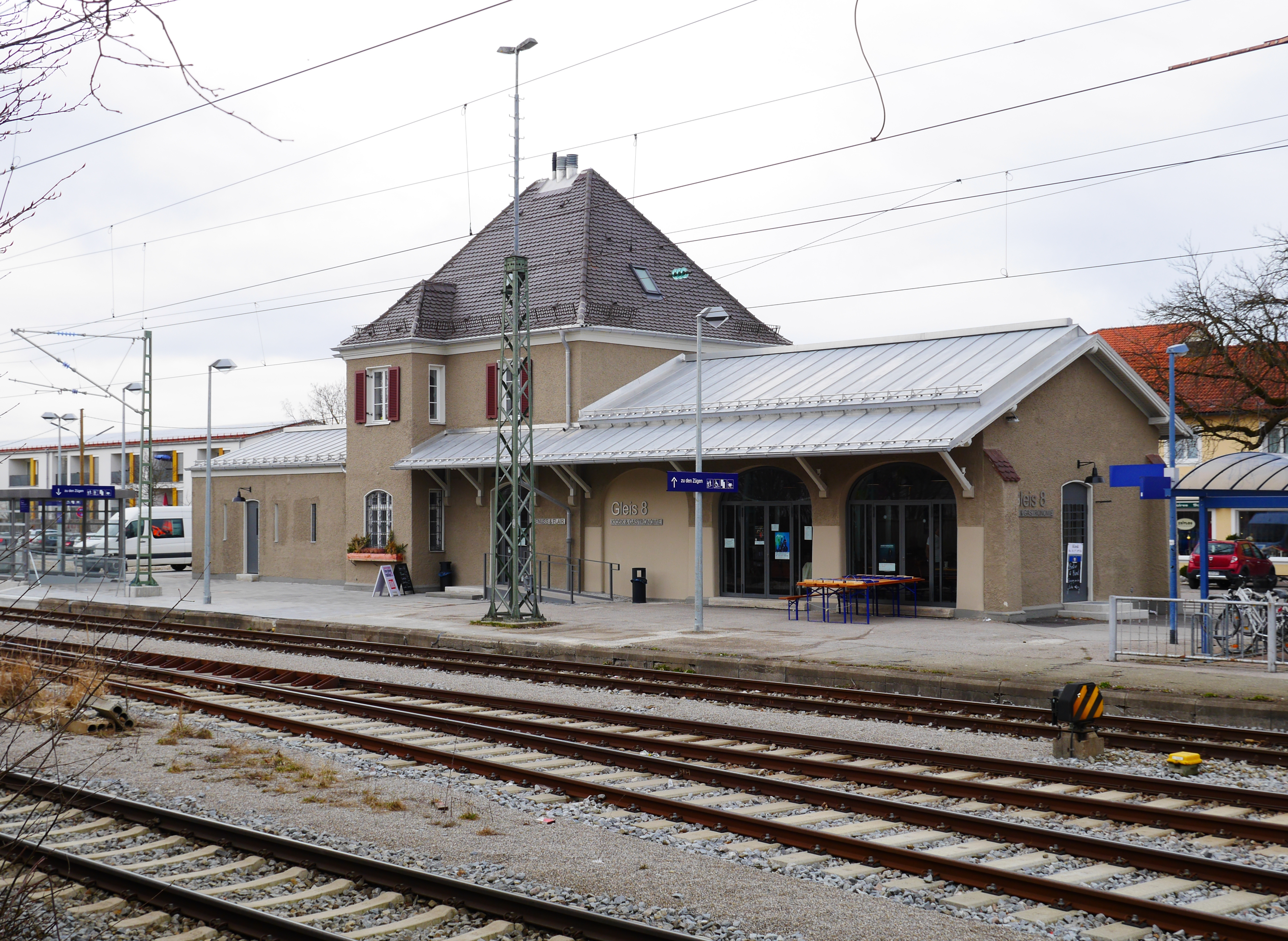
- 2019

General information
- Location: Am Bahnhof 3; 82205 Gilching; Bavaria; Germany
- Coordinates: 48.1061°N 11.3004°E
- Elevation: 561 m (1,841 ft)
- System: Bf
- Owner: Deutsche Bahn
- Operator: DB Netz; DB Station&Service
- Lines: Munich–Herrsching railway (KBS 999.8)
- Platforms: 1 island platform
- Tracks: 3
- Train operators: S-Bahn München
- Connections: 949, 957, 8500, X900

Construction
- Parking: yes
- Cycle facilities: yes
- Accessible: yes

Other information
- Station code: 2124
- DS100 code: MGCH
- IBNR: 8002275
- Category: 5
- Fare zone: : 2
- Website: www.bahnhof.de

History
- Opened: 1 July 1903; 123 years ago

Services
| Preceding station | Munich S-Bahn | Following station |
|---|---|---|
| Neugilching towards Weßling | S5 | Geisenbrunn towards Kreuzstraße |
| Neugilching towards Herrsching | S8 | Geisenbrunn towards Flughafen |
Location
- Location within Bavaria Location within Germany Location within Europe

Gilching-Argelsried station is a railway station in the municipality of Gilching, located in the Starnberg district in Upper Bavaria, Germany.
