= Munich-Freiham station =

Railway station in Munich, Germany

München Freiham
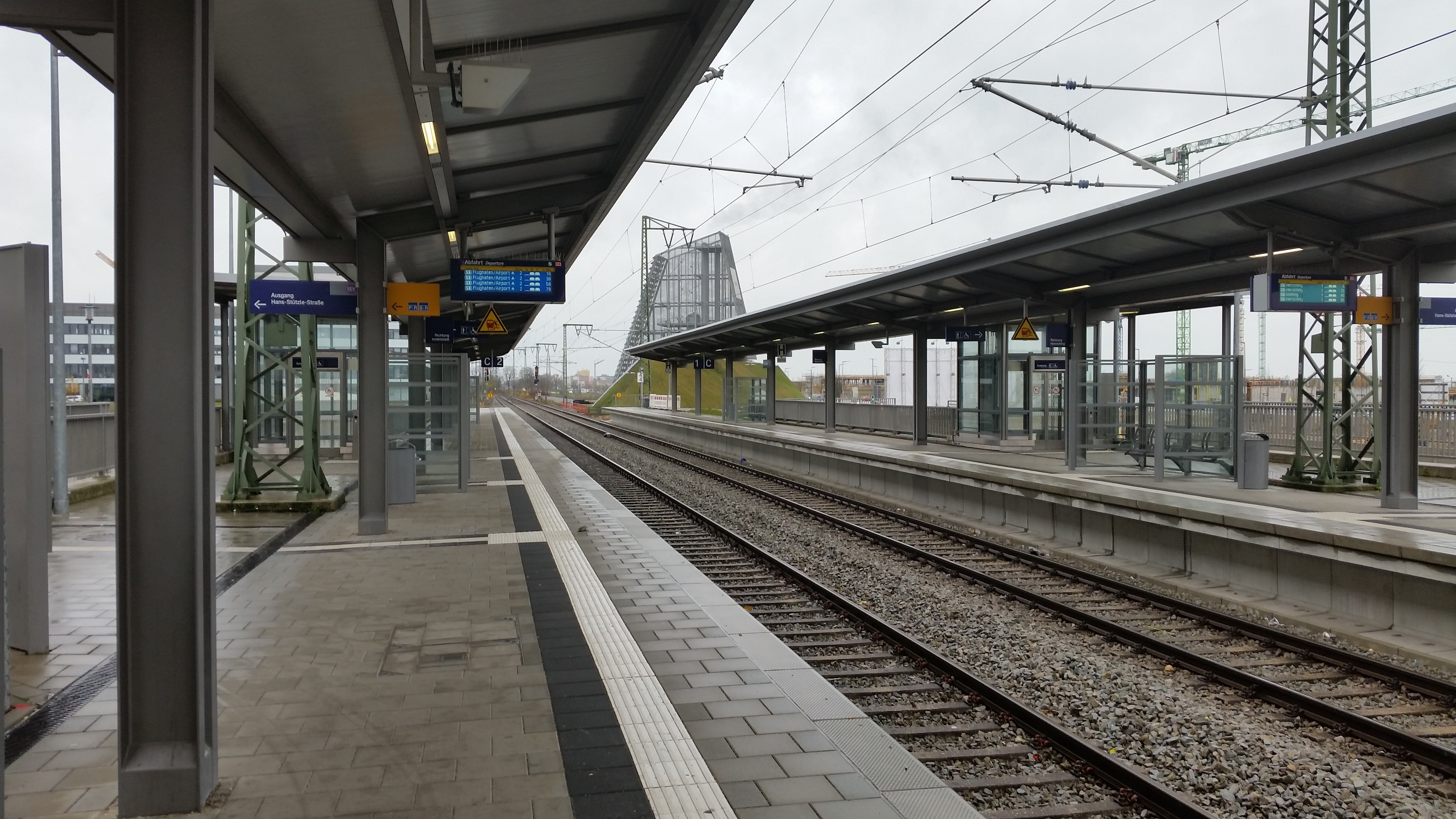
- 2017

General information
- Location: Hans-Stützle-Straße; 81249 Munich; Aubing-Lochhausen-Langwied; Bavaria; Germany
- Coordinates: 48.14°N 11.41°E
- System: Hp
- Owner: Deutsche Bahn
- Operator: DB Netz; DB Station&Service
- Lines: Munich–Herrsching railway (KBS 999.8)
- Platforms: 2 side platforms
- Tracks: 2
- Train operators: S-Bahn München
- Connections: 143, 157, 860, E162, N77, N80, N81

Construction
- Parking: yes
- Cycle facilities: yes
- Accessible: yes

Other information
- Station code: 4254
- DS100 code: MFHH
- IBNR: 8004181
- Category: 4
- Fare zone: : M and 1
- Website: www.bahnhof.de

History
- Opened: 14 September 2013; 12 years ago

Services
Preceding station	Munich S-Bahn	Following station
Harthaus towards Weßling	S5	Munich-Neuaubing towards Kreuzstraße
Harthaus towards Herrsching	S8	Munich-Neuaubing towards Flughafen
Location
- Location within Bavaria Location within Germany Location within Europe

Munich-Freiham station is a railway station in the Aubing-Lochhausen-Langwied borough of Munich, Germany.
