= Neugilching station =

Railway station in Bavaria, Germany

Neugilching

General information
- Location: St.-Gilgener-Straße; 82205 Gilching; Bavaria; Germany
- Coordinates: 48.1061°N 11.3004°E
- System: Hp
- Owner: Deutsche Bahn
- Operator: DB Netz; DB Station&Service
- Lines: Munich–Herrsching railway (KBS 999.8)
- Platforms: 2 side platforms
- Tracks: 2
- Train operators: S-Bahn München
- Connections: 957, 8500

Construction
- Parking: yes
- Cycle facilities: yes
- Accessible: partly

Other information
- Station code: 4395
- DS100 code: MNGH
- IBNR: 8004249
- Category: 5
- Fare zone: : 2
- Website: www.bahnhof.de

History
- Opened: 1 May 1972; 54 years ago

Services
| Preceding station | Munich S-Bahn | Following station |
|---|---|---|
| Weßling (Oberbay) towards Weßling | S5 | Gilching-Argelsried towards Kreuzstraße |
| Weßling (Oberbay) towards Herrsching | S8 | Gilching-Argelsried towards Flughafen |
Location
- Location within Bavaria Location within Germany Location within Europe

Neugilching station is a railway station in the municipality of Neugilching, located in the Starnberg district in Upper Bavaria, Germany.

== History ==
The Neugilching stop went into operation on 1 May 1972 shortly before the start of the S-Bahn operation as a replacement for the Weichselbaum stop, which was closed at the same time. The unoccupied Haltepunkt is located in the centre of the Gilching district of Neugilching and was initially equipped with a side platform. With the double-track line extension, Deutsche Bundesbahn built a second side platform by 1985.
