= Munich-Neuaubing station =

Railway station in Munich, Germany

Neuaubing
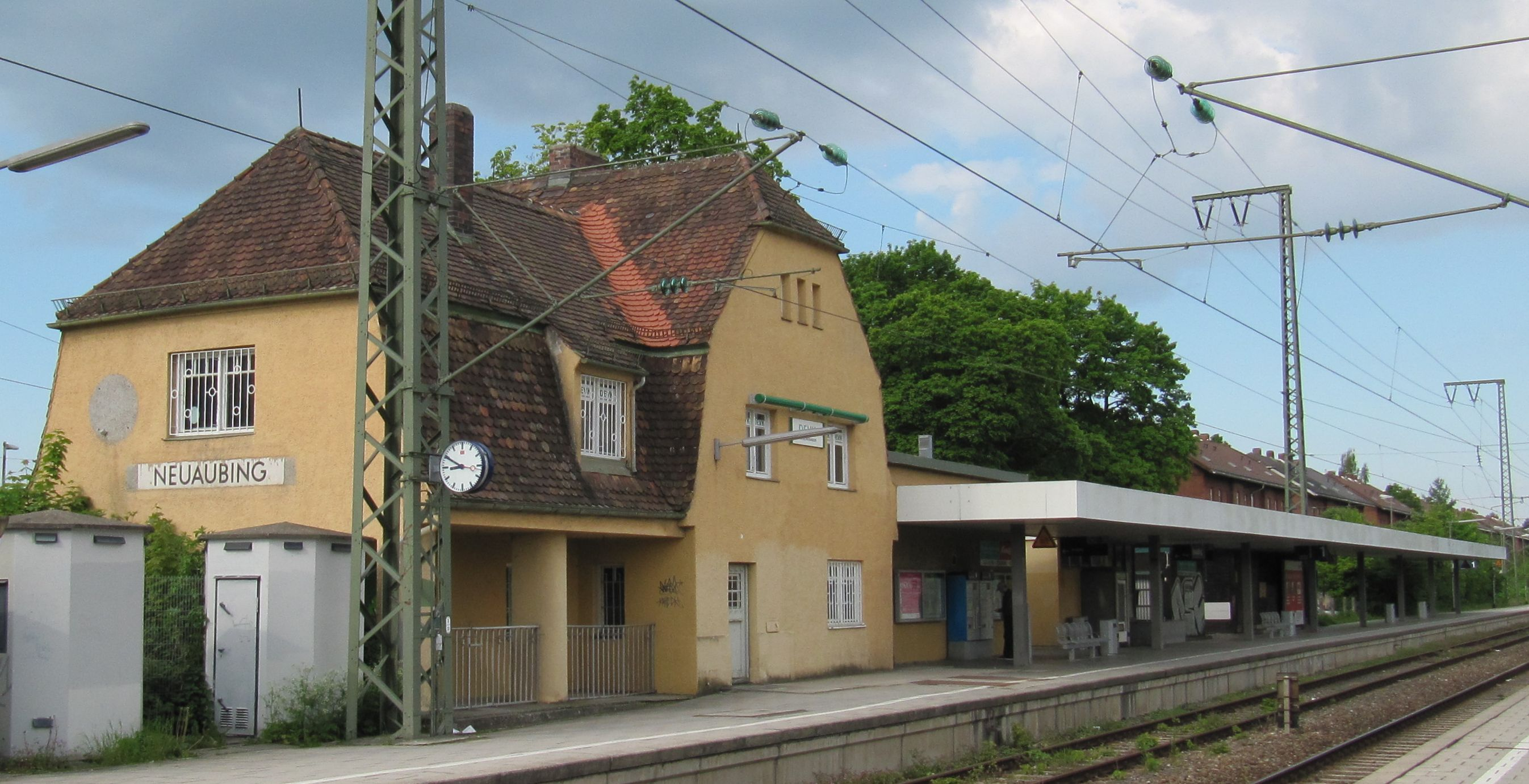
- 2010

General information
- Location: Papinstraße 6; 81249 Munich; Aubing-Lochhausen-Langwied, Bavaria; Germany
- Coordinates: 48.1412°N 11.4222°E
- Owner: Deutsche Bahn
- Operator: DB Netz; DB Station&Service
- Lines: Munich–Herrsching railway (KBS 999.8)
- Platforms: 2 side platforms
- Tracks: 2
- Train operators: S-Bahn München
- Connections: 267, N80, N81

Construction
- Parking: yes
- Cycle facilities: yes
- Accessible: partly

Other information
- Station code: 4263
- DS100 code: MNA
- IBNR: 8004156
- Category: 5
- Fare zone: : M and 1
- Website: www.bahnhof.de

History
- Opened: 20 November 1905; 120 years ago

Services
Preceding station	Munich S-Bahn	Following station
Freiham towards Weßling	S5	Westkreuz towards Kreuzstraße
Freiham towards Herrsching	S8	Westkreuz towards Flughafen
Location

Munich-Neuaubing station is a railway station in the Aubing-Lochhausen-Langwied borough of Munich, Germany.
