= Munich Hirschgarten station =

Munich S-Bahn station

München Hirschgarten
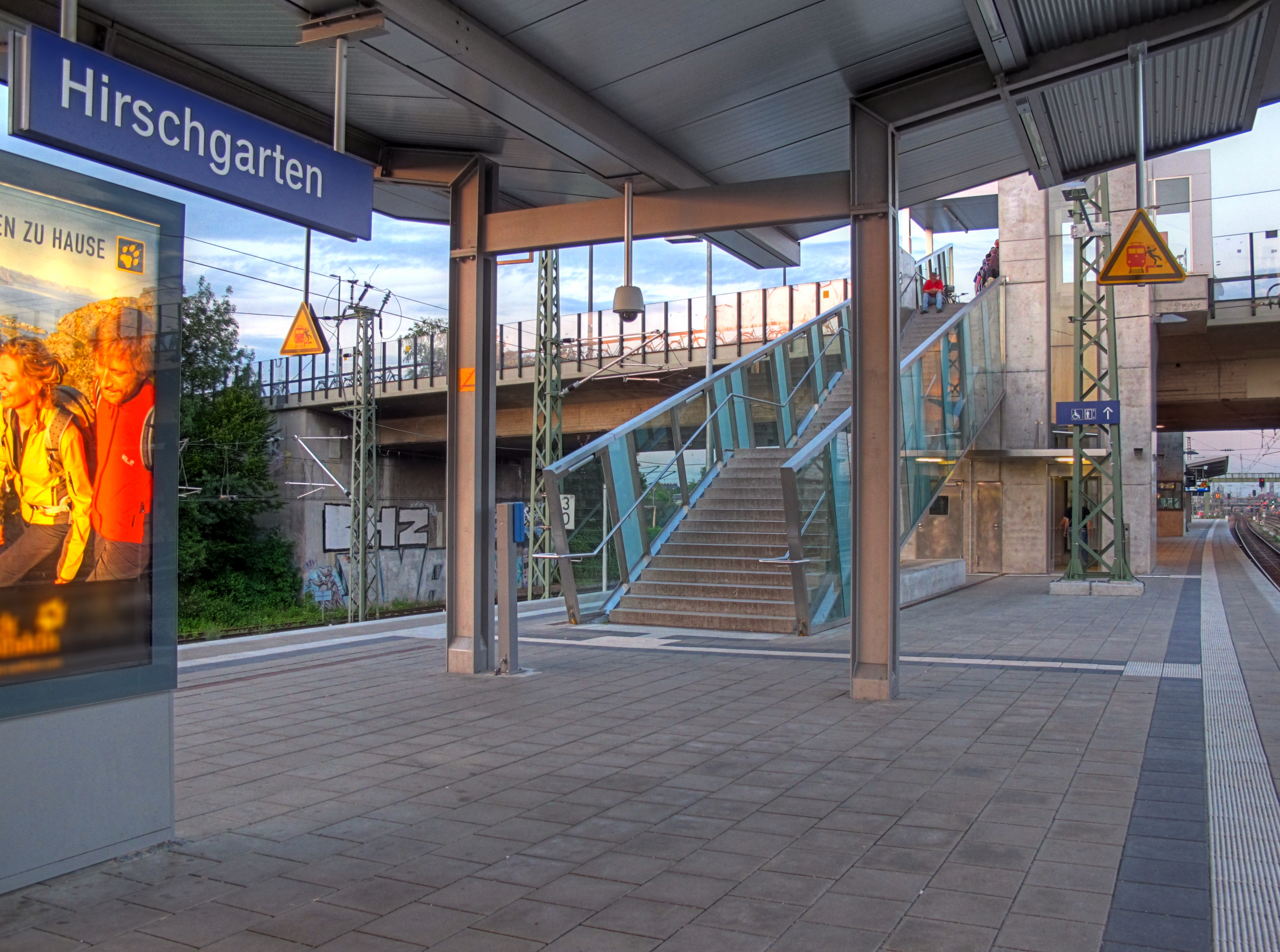
- 2011

General information
- Location: Friedenheimer Brücke; 80639 Munich; Neuhausen-Nymphenburg; Bavaria; Germany
- Coordinates: 48°08′37″N 11°31′10″E
- Owner: DB Netz
- Operator: DB Station&Service
- Lines: S-Bahn trunk line (KBS 999)
- Platforms: 1 island platform
- Tracks: 2
- Train operators: S-Bahn München
- Connections: 62, N43, N44

Other information
- Station code: 8154
- DS100 code: MMHG
- IBNR: 8004179
- Category: 3
- Fare zone: : M
- Website: www.bahnhof.de

History
- Opened: 13 December 2009; 16 years ago

Services
Preceding station	Munich S-Bahn	Following station
Munich-Laim towards Freising or Flughafen	S1	Munich Donnersbergerbrücke towards Leuchtenbergring
Munich-Laim towards Petershausen or Altomünster	S2	Munich Donnersbergerbrücke towards Erding
Munich-Laim towards Mammendorf	S3	Munich Donnersbergerbrücke towards Holzkirchen
Munich-Laim towards Geltendorf	S4	Munich Donnersbergerbrücke towards Ebersberg
Munich-Laim towards Weßling	S5	Munich Donnersbergerbrücke towards Kreuzstraße
Munich-Laim towards Tutzing	S6	Munich Donnersbergerbrücke towards Ebersberg
Munich-Laim towards Herrsching	S8	Munich Donnersbergerbrücke towards Flughafen
Location

Munich Hirschgarten is a Munich S-Bahn railway station on the main line between Laim and Donnersbergerbrücke railway stations at Friedenheimer Brücke. It was opened in December 2009 and provides transportation access for the new quarter under development at Birketweg nearby. In early planning stages, the proposed name was "Friedenheimer Brücke". The station is served by the lines S1, S2, S3, S4, S5, S6 and S8 of the Munich S-Bahn network, which connect the station with the city centre (all lines), Munich Airport (S1 and S8) and suburban areas. Each of these lines run services every 20 minutes, with some increased to every 10 minutes during peak hours, therefore connecting Hirschgarten with the city centre every 2–4 minutes.
