= Steinebach station =

Railway station in Bavaria, Germany

Steinebach
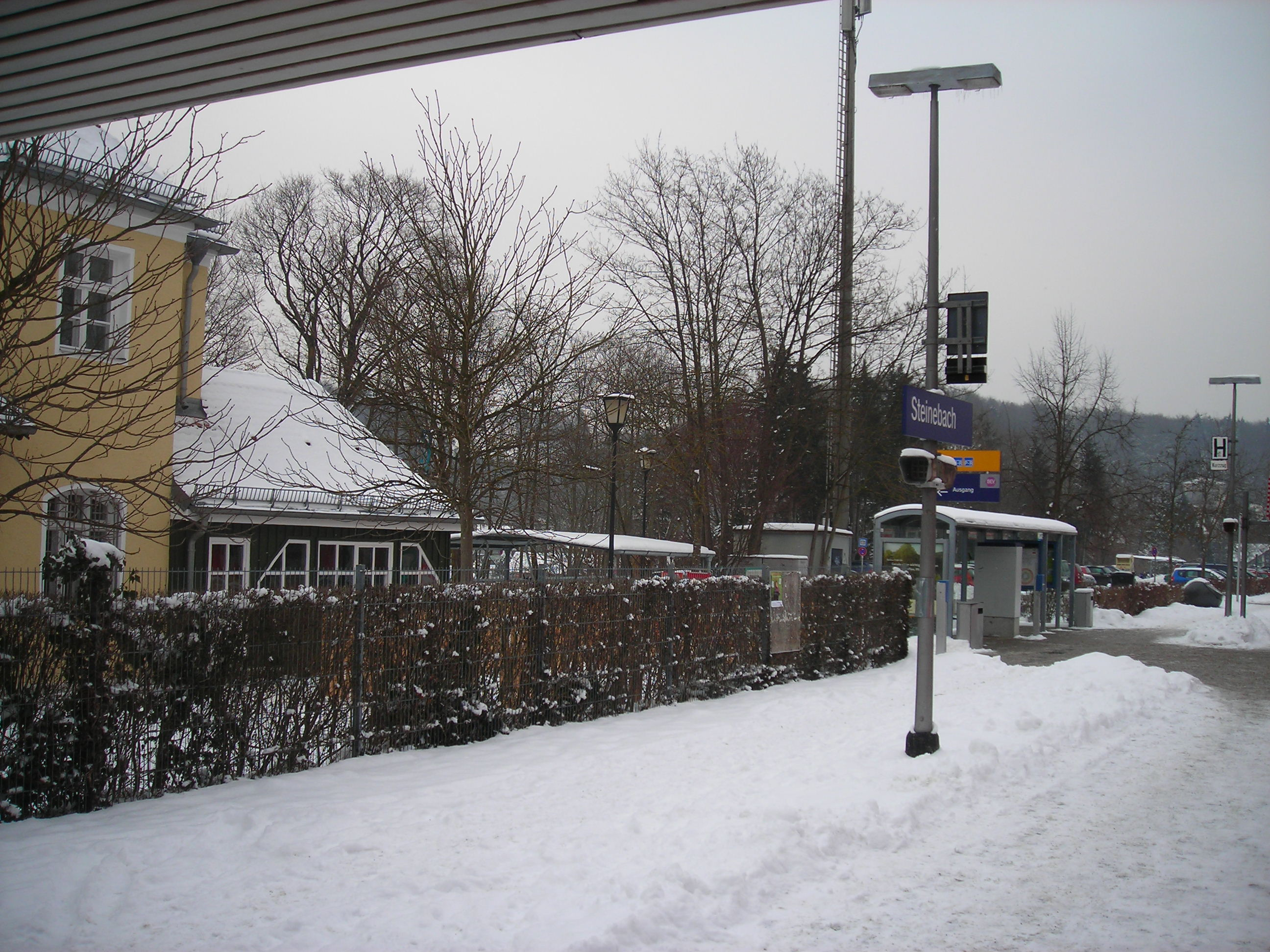

General information
- Location: Bahnhofstraße 2; 82237 Wörthsee; Bavaria; Germany
- Coordinates: 48°03′40″N 11°12′24″E
- Elevation: 582 m (1,909 ft)
- System: Hp
- Owner: DB Netz
- Operator: DB Station&Service
- Lines: Munich–Herrsching railway (KBS 999.8)
- Platforms: 1 side platform
- Tracks: 1
- Train operators: S-Bahn München
- Connections: 923, 928

Other information
- Station code: 5991
- DS100 code: MSA
- IBNR: 8005699
- Category: 6
- Fare zone: : 2 and 3
- Website: www.bahnhof.de

History
- Opened: 1 July 1903; 123 years ago

Services
Preceding station	Munich S-Bahn	Following station
Seefeld-Hechendorf towards Herrsching	S8	Weßling (Oberbay) towards Flughafen
Location
- Location within Bavaria Location within Germany Location within Europe

Steinebach station is a railway station in the municipality of Wörthsee, located in the Starnberg district in Upper Bavaria, Germany.

== Notable places nearby ==
- Wörthsee
