= Munich-Westkreuz station =

Railway station in Munich, Germany

München Westkreuz
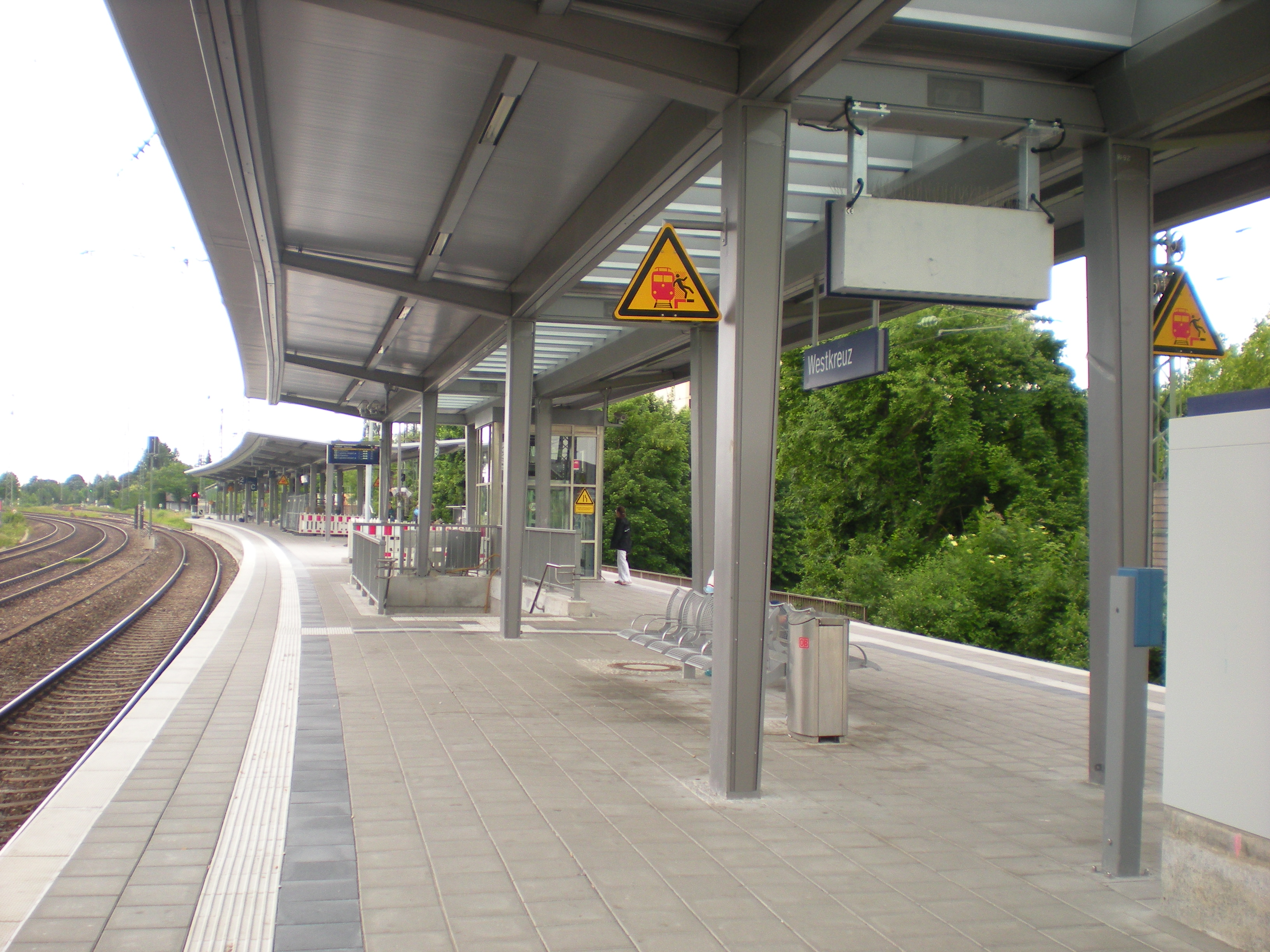
- 2012

General information
- Location: Aubingerstr. 23; 81243 Munich; Pasing; Bavaria, Germany
- Coordinates: 48.1488°N 11.4437°E
- Owner: Deutsche Bahn
- Operator: DB Netz; DB Station&Service
- Lines: Munich–Garmisch-Partenkirchen railway; Munich–Herrsching railway
- Distance: 1.4 km (0.87 mi) from Munich-Pasing; 8.9 km (5.5 mi) from München Hauptbahnhof
- Platforms: 1 island platform
- Tracks: 2
- Train operators: S-Bahn München
- Connections: 157, N77

Construction
- Accessible: Yes

Other information
- Station code: 4271
- DS100 code: MWKR
- IBNR: 8004163
- Category: 4
- Fare zone: : M and 1
- Website: www.bahnhof.de; stationsdatenbank.de

History
- Opened: 31 May 1970

Services
Preceding station	Munich S-Bahn	Following station
Neuaubing towards Weßling	S5	Pasing towards Kreuzstraße
Lochham towards Tutzing	S6	Pasing towards Ebersberg
Neuaubing towards Herrsching	S8	Pasing towards Flughafen
Location

Munich-Westkreuz (literally "Munich West Cross") is a railway station in the Pasing district of Munich. It is served by the S-Bahn lines S6 and S8.

The station is located at the junction of the Munich–Garmisch-Partenkirchen and Munich–Herrsching railways.
