= Munich-Laim station =

Munich S-Bahn station

München Laim Pbf
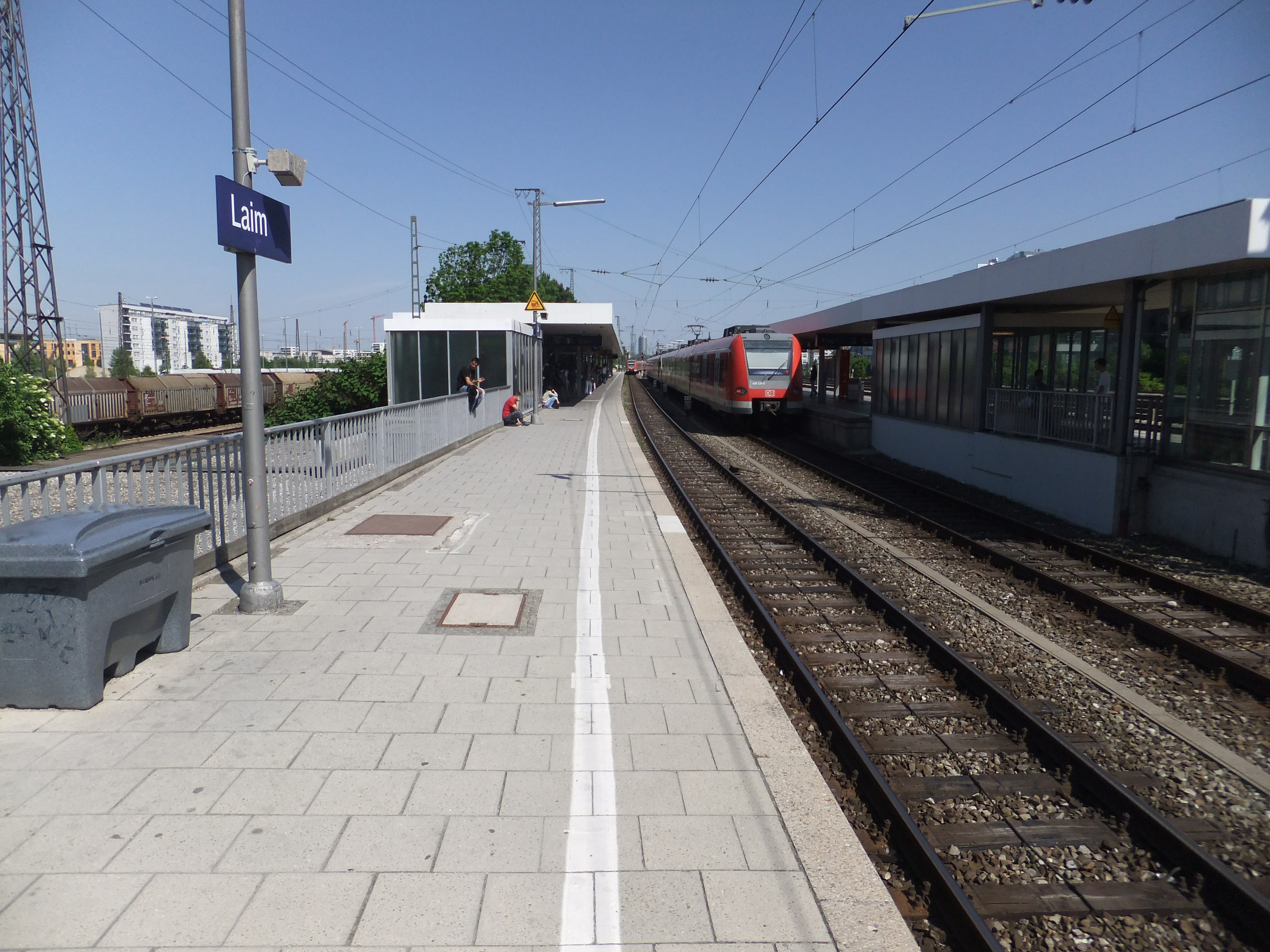
- 2012

General information
- Location: Wotanstr. 3, Munich, Bavaria; Germany
- Coordinates: 48°08′40″N 11°30′12″E
- Owner: DB Netz
- Operator: DB Station&Service
- Lines: S-Bahn trunk line (KBS 999)
- Platforms: 1 island platform 1 side platform
- Tracks: 3
- Train operators: S-Bahn München
- Connections: 130, 151, 157, 168, N78

Construction
- Accessible: No (except platform 1)

Other information
- Station code: 4258
- DS100 code: ML
- IBNR: 8004151
- Category: 3
- Fare zone: : M
- Website: stationsdatenbank.de; www.bahnhof.de

History
- Opened: 30 August 1894; 131 years ago
- Electrified: 3 January 1927; 99 years ago

Passengers
- 35,200 daily

Services
Preceding station	Munich S-Bahn	Following station
Moosach towards Freising or Flughafen	S1	Hirschgarten towards Leuchtenbergring
Obermenzing towards Petershausen or Altomünster	S2	Hirschgarten towards Erding
Pasing towards Mammendorf	S3	Hirschgarten towards Holzkirchen
Pasing towards Geltendorf	S4	Hirschgarten towards Ebersberg
Pasing towards Weßling	S5	Hirschgarten towards Kreuzstraße
Pasing towards Tutzing	S6	Hirschgarten towards Ebersberg
Pasing towards Herrsching	S8	Hirschgarten towards Flughafen
Location

Munich-Laim station is a station on the trunk line of the Munich S-Bahn between Munich Central Station (German: Hauptbahnhof) and München-Pasing station. It is part of a large rail precinct, including Munich Laim marshalling yard. It has three platform tracks and is classified by Deutsche Bahn as a category 3 station.

== History ==
South of the marshalling yard, the Laim passenger station was built above the new Laim subway. On 30 August 1894, the station was opened as the temporary terminus of the double-track suburban railway, which connected the Central Station with Laim parallel to the long-distance railway tracks. On 1 May 1895, the extension of the suburban railway to Pasing station went into operation. The station consisted of a double-track island platform, located to the west of the later S-Bahn island platform, and a main service building.

For the introduction of the S-Bahn München, the suburban line to Pasing was connected to the lines to Allach and Moosach, for which the old island platform was replaced by a new one to the east in 1969 and the station was extended by an additional track with a side platform for out-of-town traffic. The new platform was served in advance by commuter trains from 1 September 1971, before the S-Bahn was opened on 28 May 1972.

Accessible from the passenger station, there was a provisional side platform on the marshalling yard side in 2007, which was also used for special trains. As the trunk line 2 is to branch off at Laim station, the station is currently being extended to four tracks to form a junction station in both directions. The main service building was demolished to extend the previous side platform to an island platform and rebuild the other. In addition, a further accessible access is built on the east side of the station to a new tunnel with a stop for buses and the tram line below the station.

== Operations ==
=== S-Bahn ===
S-Bahn lines S 1 to Freising or the Airport and S 2 to Dachau or Petershausen separate from lines S 3, S 4, S 5, S 6 and S 8 to Pasing at this station.

Platform 1 is used by S-Bahn trains heading out of the city. A few metres from the platform, the track carrying lines S 3, S 4, S 5, S 6 and S 8 branches to the right away from the track carrying lines S 1 and S 2 and then crosses over it on a flyover. The nearest stations in this direction are Pasing, Obermenzing and Moosach. It is possible to transfer to regional and long-distance services in Pasing. Platform track 2 is used by S-Bahn trains heading into city on lines S1 and S2. Platform track 3 is used by S-Bahn services heading into city from Pasing. The next stop into the city is Hirschgarten.

The S-Bahn running between Pasing and Deisenhofen does not stop at Laim station, but runs south of it on the track to/from Solln.

Wotanstraße passes under the station through the Laim underpass, which has a maximum headroom of 3.20 m. Bus routes 51, 151 and 168 pass through the underpass. In the medium to long term, it is proposed that a tram line will be built here. South of the Laim underpass there is a bus stop served by routes 51, 131, 151 and 168. At night this is served by night bus N48.

=== Freight ===
Previously München-Laim marshalling yard (Rangierbahnhof) was along with Munich East marshalling yard one of Munich's two marshalling yards. With the commissioning of the new Munich North marshalling yards, the station's marshalling yard lost its purpose, as wagons were now handling at the new facility. As Deutsche Bahn required additional storage space for Intercity-Express trains, parts of the old rail yard were rebuilt and modernised. The trains enter these storage sidings via a connecting track from the Munich Hauptbahnhof depot.

Through freight trains from Pasing, Ingolstadt and Landshut also pass Laim station before they run via Munich South towards Rosenheim and Austria.

== Interlockings ==
Rail operations in the Laim station precinct are handled from different signal boxes:

- The S-Bahn tracks to Donnersbergerbrücke are handled by the electronic interlocking at DB Netz‘s operations centre in Munich.
- The modernised tracks of the ICE depot are controlled by the dispatcher in the depot.
- The tracks of the former marshalling yard have been controlled since December 2008 by the electronic interlocking at the yard, which is also connected to the Munich operation centre. The track plan interlocking of 1951 and two mechanical interlocking of 1900 (signal box 3) and 1894 (signal box 1) were taken out of service at the same time. Since the commissioning of the Moosburg/Isar electronic interlocking and the related closure of signal boxes in the Langenbach (Oberbayern) station, signal box 2 in Laim yard has been Bavaria's oldest signal box that can be used to control signalling directly.

== Gallery ==
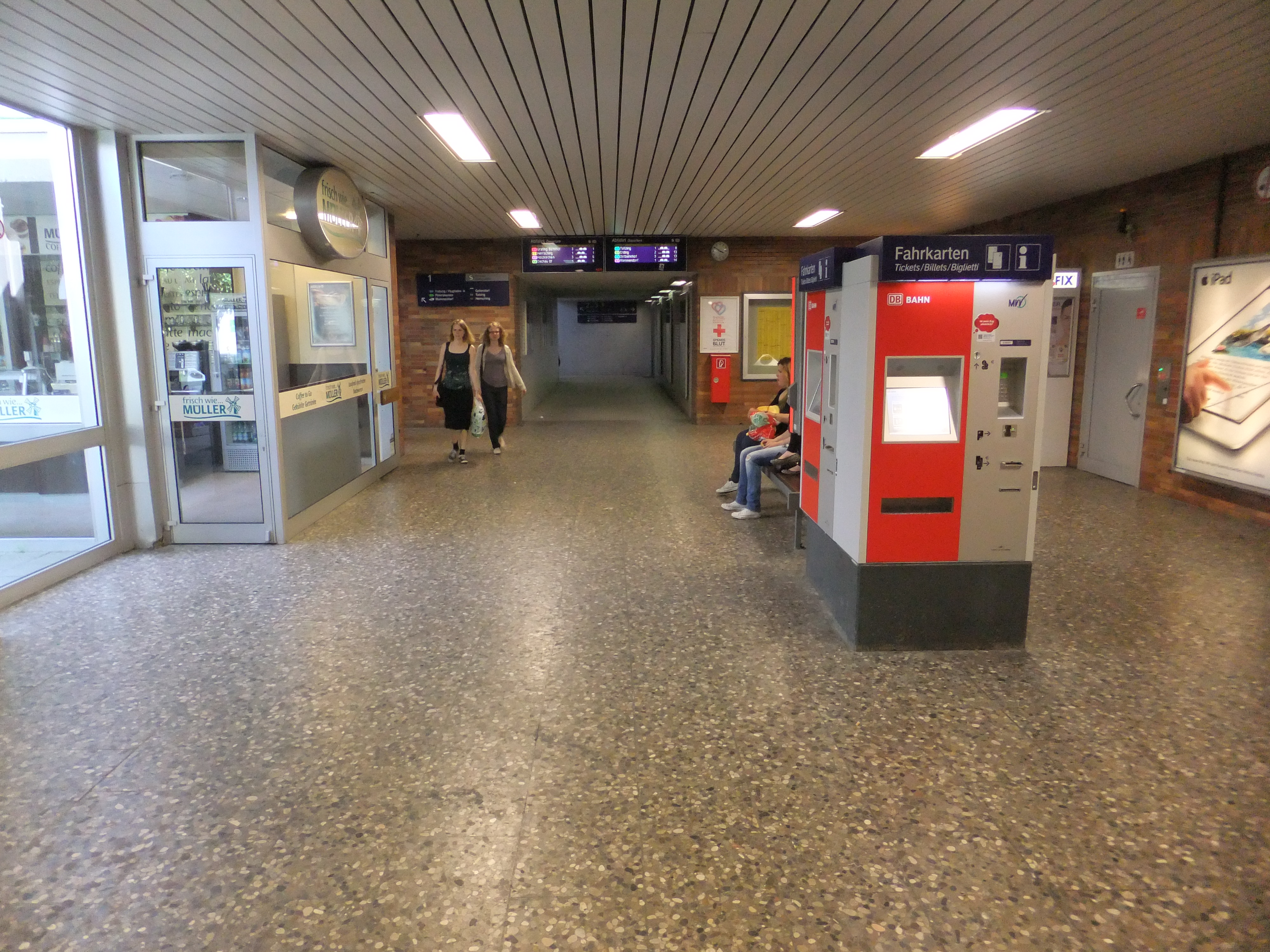
The station hall

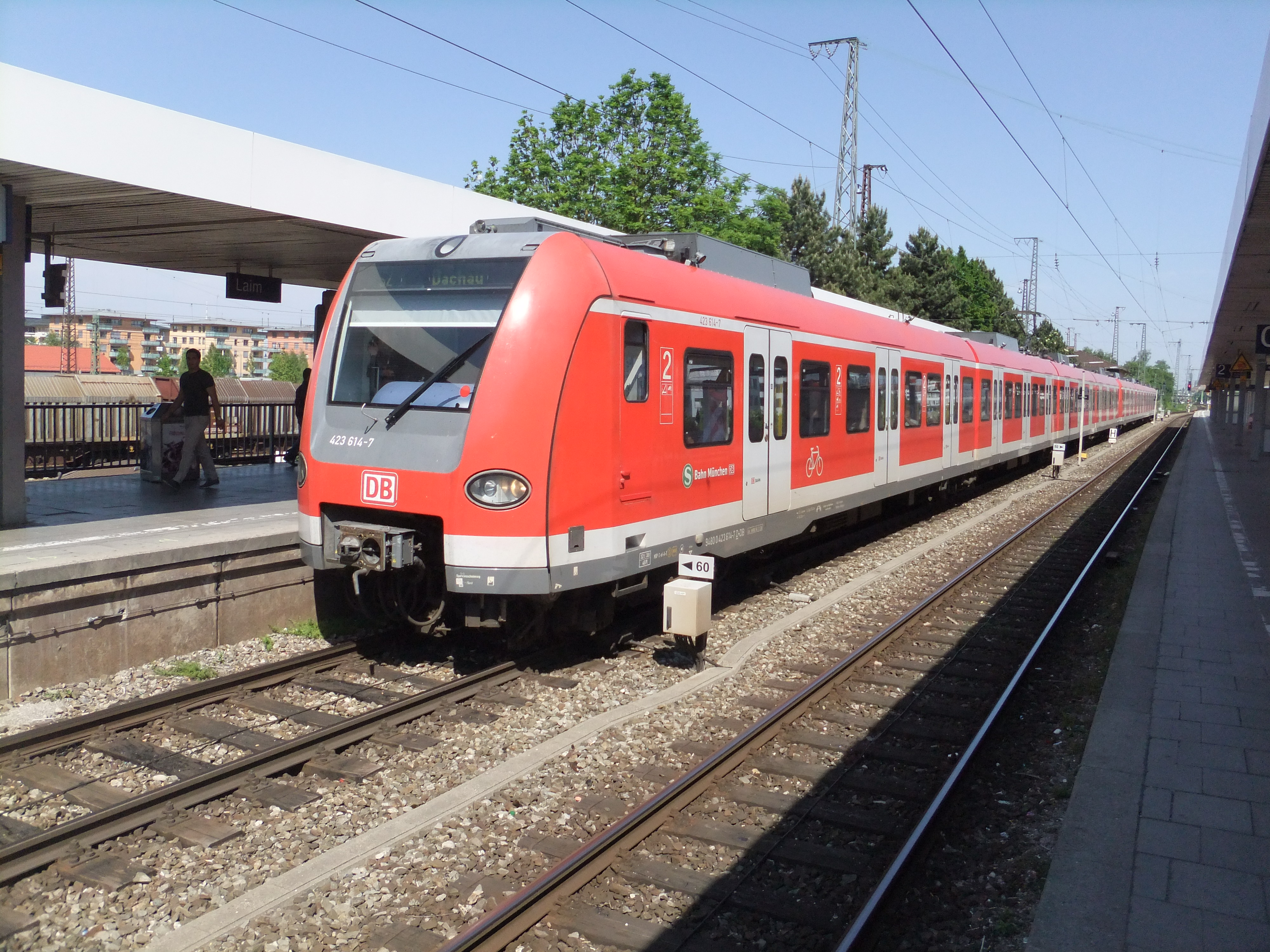
Class 423 on line S2 in München-Laim station

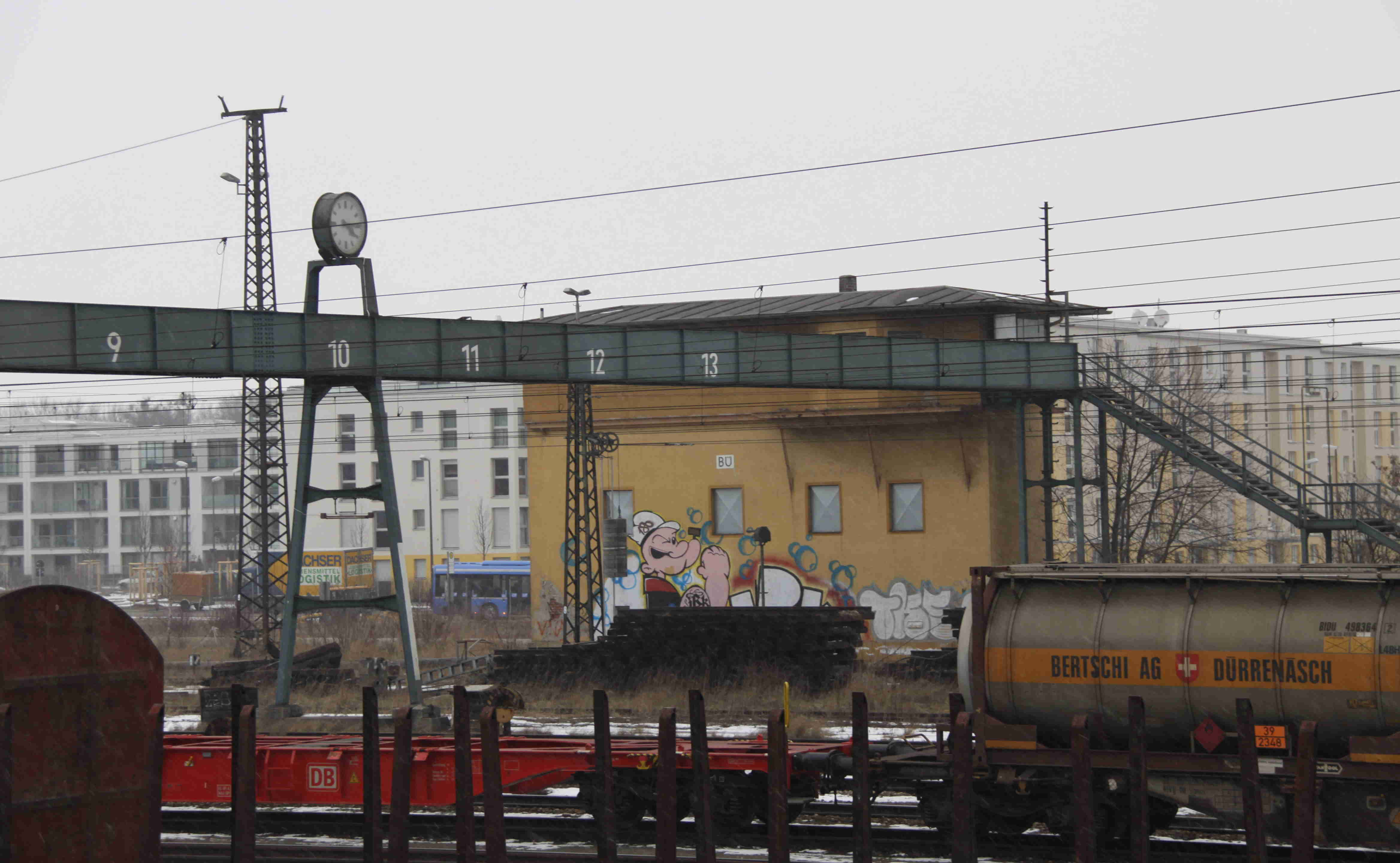
Pedestrian bridge over the freight tracks in Laim

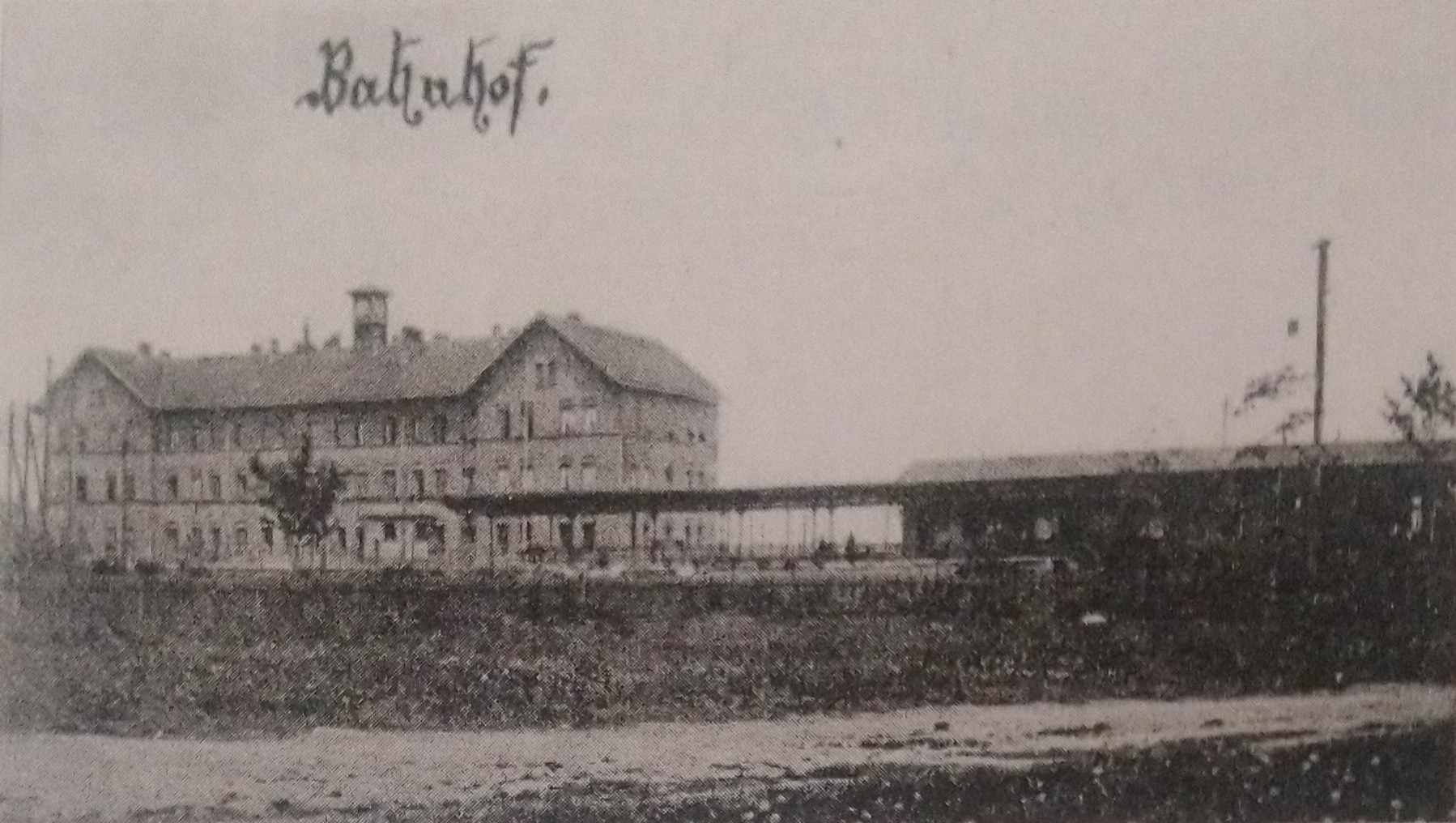
Laim station (1900)

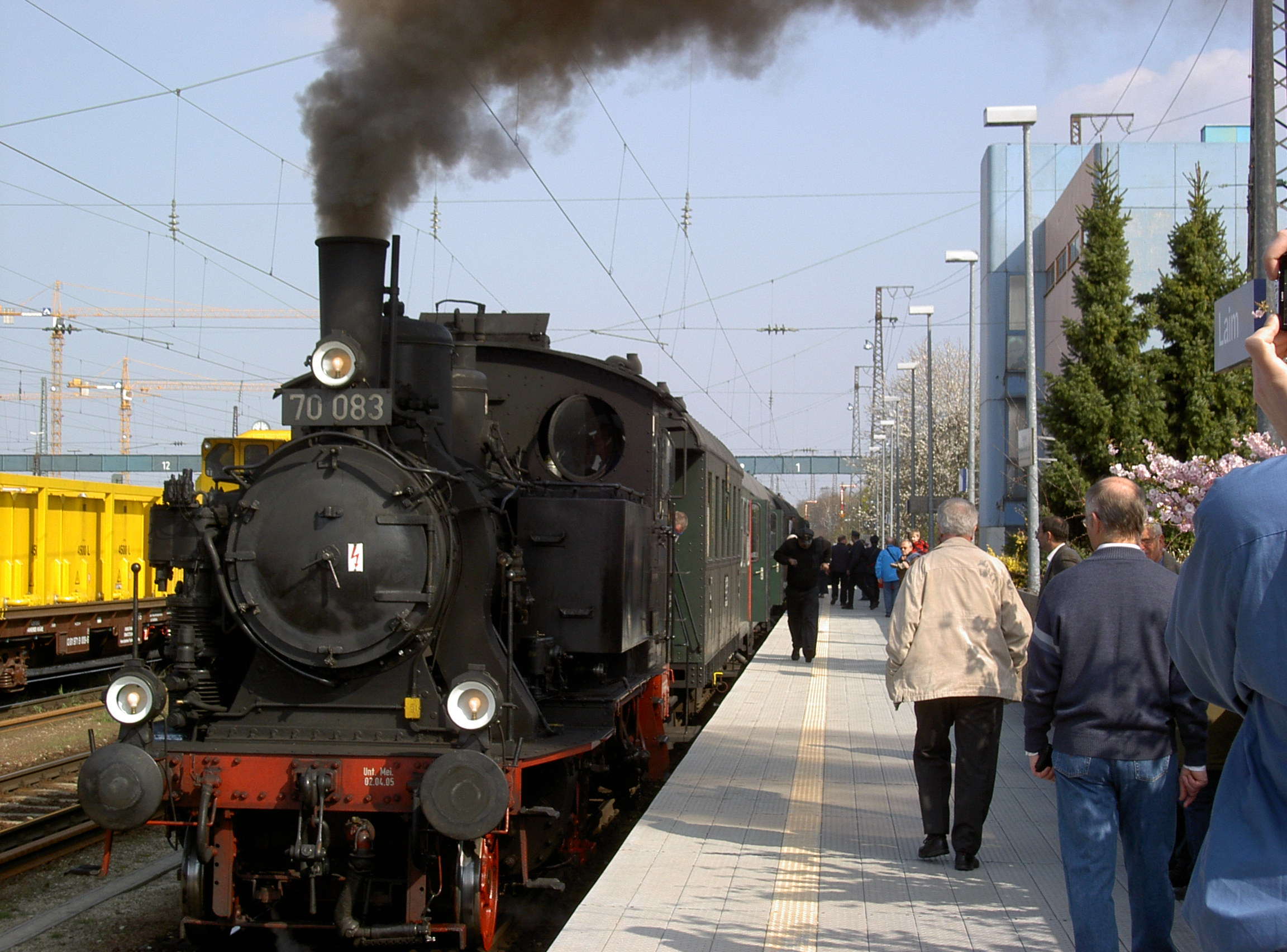
Provisional platform (2007)
