= Westkreuz station =

Westkreuz station may refer to the following S-Bahn railway stations in Germany:

- Berlin Westkreuz station in Berlin
- Munich-Westkreuz station in Munich
