= Seefeld-Hechendorf station =

Railway station in Bavaria, Germany

Seefeld-Hechendorf
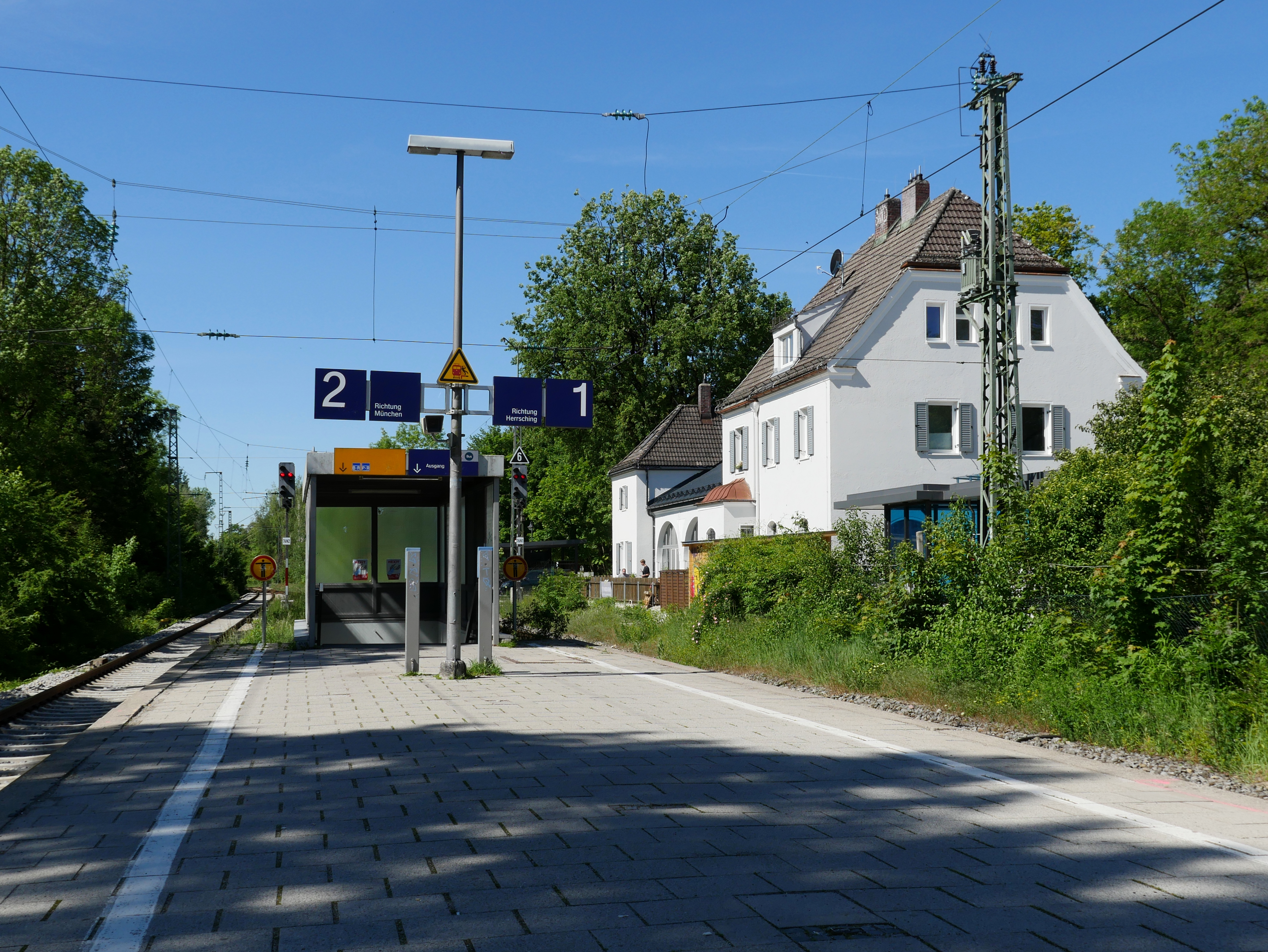
- 2019

General information
- Location: Bahnhofstraße 4; 82229 Seefeld; Bavaria; Germany
- Coordinates: 48°02′30″N 11°11′56″E
- Elevation: 559 m (1,834 ft)
- Owner: DB Netz
- Operator: DB Station&Service
- Lines: Munich–Herrsching railway (KBS 999.8)
- Platforms: 1 island platform
- Tracks: 2
- Train operators: S-Bahn München
- Connections: 820, 924, 928, 950, 8400

Other information
- Station code: 5784
- DS100 code: MSH
- IBNR: 8005504
- Category: 5
- Fare zone: : 3 and 4
- Website: www.bahnhof.de

History
- Opened: 1 July 1903; 123 years ago

Services
Preceding station	Munich S-Bahn	Following station
Herrsching Terminus	S8	Steinebach towards Flughafen
Location
- Location within Bavaria Location within Germany Location within Europe

Seefeld-Hechendorf station is a railway station in the municipality of Seefeld, located in the Starnberg district in Upper Bavaria, Germany.

== Notable places nearby ==
- Pilsensee
- Seefeld Castle
- Wörthsee
