= Munich-Daglfing station =

Railway station in Germany

München Daglfing
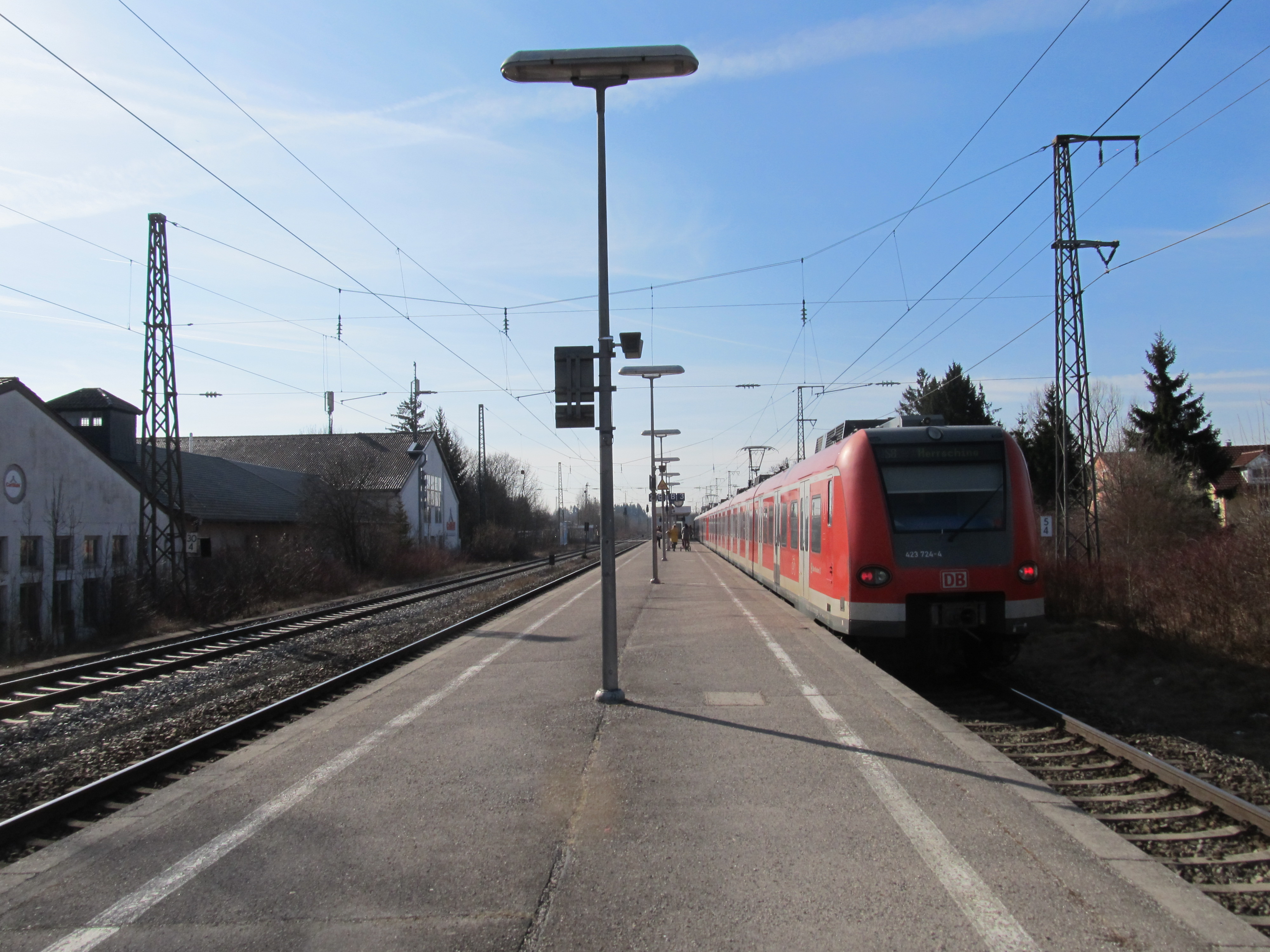
- The station in 2012

General information
- Location: Munich, Bavaria; Germany
- Coordinates: 48°8′57″N 11°38′58″E
- Owner: Deutsche Bahn
- Operator: DB Netz; DB Station&Service
- Lines: Munich East–Munich Airport (S8) (KBS 999.8)
- Platforms: 1 island platform
- Tracks: 3
- Train operators: S-Bahn München
- Connections: 183, 188, 189

Construction
- Parking: yes
- Cycle facilities: yes
- Accessible: no

Other information
- Station code: 3010
- DS100 code: MDFG
- Category: 4
- Fare zone: : M
- Website: www.bahnhof.de

History
- Opened: 5 June 1909

Services
Preceding station	Munich S-Bahn	Following station
Leuchtenbergring towards Herrsching	S8	Englschalking towards Flughafen
Location

Munich-Daglfing is a Munich S-Bahn railway station in the borough of Bogenhausen. Close to the station is the Zamilapark.
