= Zamilapark =

Park and residential area in Munich, Germany

Coordinates: 48°08′38″N 11°38′41″E

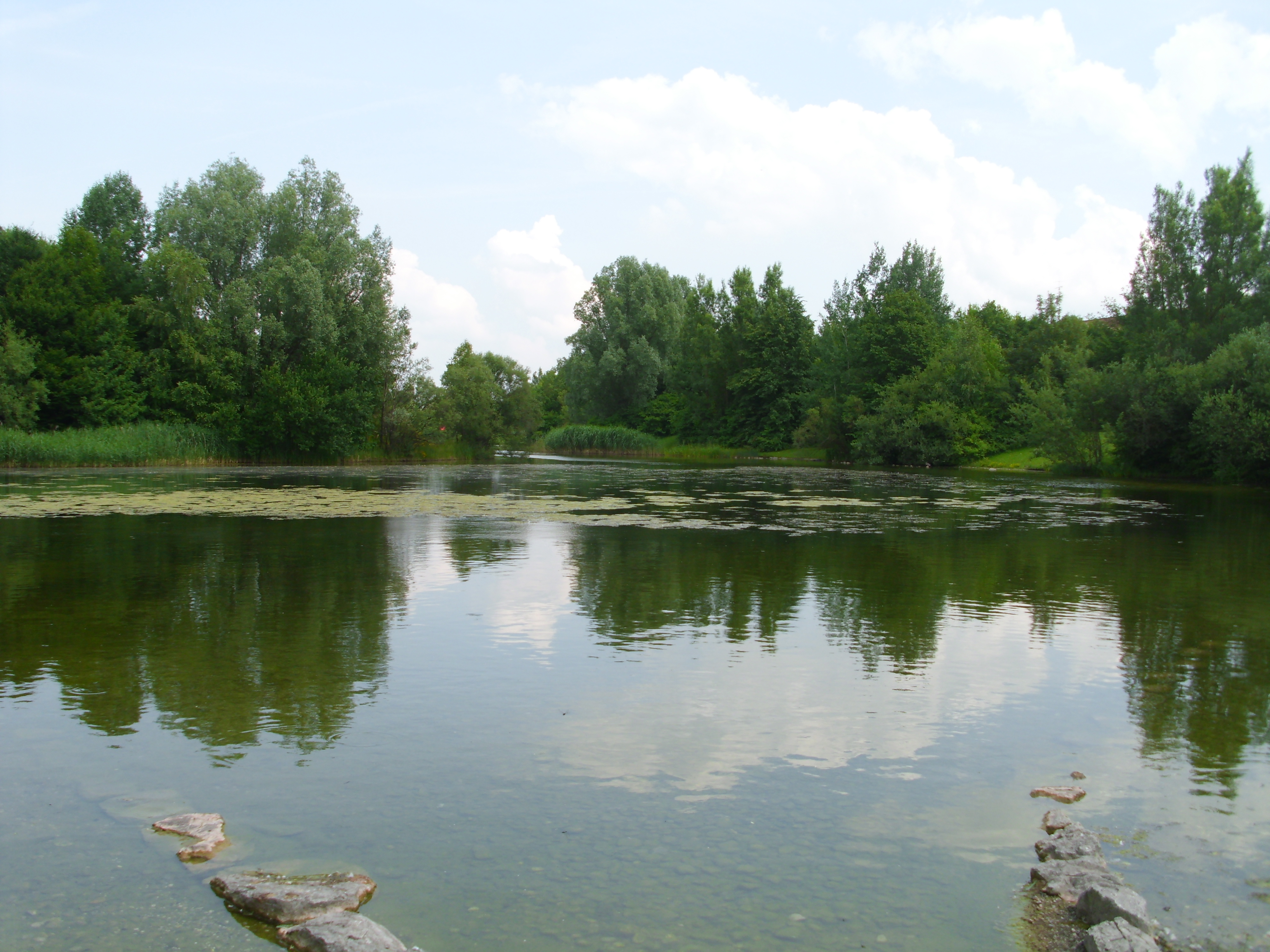
Zamilasee

The Zamilapark is a park- and residential area in Munich Zamdorf. It was built between 1983 and 1991 by Bayerische Hausbau and adjoins to the tracks of the Munich North Ring and Munich East–Munich Airport railway. Not far from the park is the S-Bahn-Station Daglfing. In the center of the park is a small lake, called Zamilasee. At the North side is a football pitch located and at the South side is the residential area.

- Zamilapark in muenchen.de
