= S8 (Munich) =

Line of the Munich S-Bahn

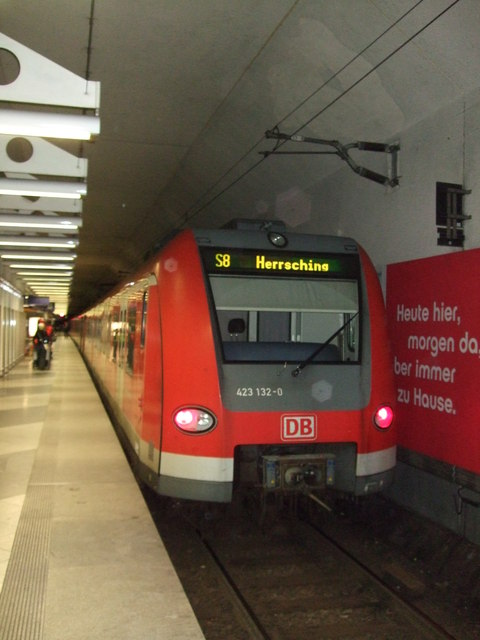

Overview
- Line number: S8
- Locale: Munich, Bavaria, Germany
- Termini: Munich Airport; Herrsching
- Stations: 32
- Website: https://www.s-bahn-muenchen.de/

Service
- System: Munich S-Bahn
- Route number: 999.8
- Operator: DB Regio Bayern
- Rolling stock: DBAG Class 423

Technical
- Track gauge: 1,435 mm (4 ft 8 1/2 in) standard gauge
- Electrification: 15 kV, 16.7 Hz AC Overhead lines

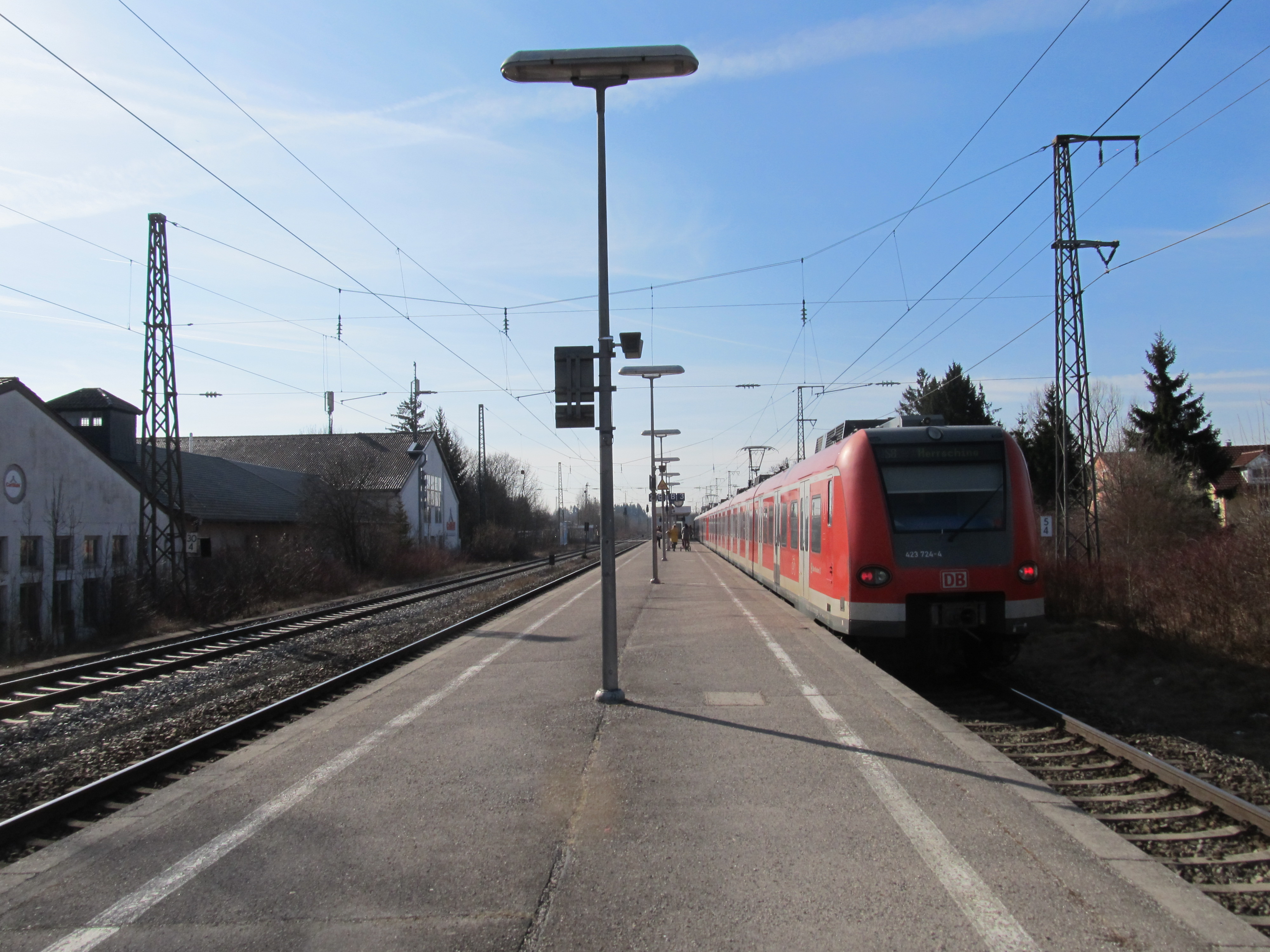
Daglfing station

Line S8 is a line on the Munich S-Bahn network. It is operated by DB Regio Bayern. It runs from Herrsching via Weßling, Pasing, central Munich and Munich East to Munich Airport station.

The line operates at 20-minute intervals between Weßling and Munich Airport. Two out of three trains an hour continue from Weßling to Herrsching, so that the gap between trains alternates between 20 and 40 minutes. It is operated using class 423 four-car electrical multiple units, usually as two coupled sets. In the evenings and on Sundays, they generally run as single sets.

The line runs over sections built at various times:

- from Herrsching to Pasing over the Munich–Herrsching railway, opened on 1 July 1903 by the Royal Bavarian State Railways
- from Pasing to the beginning of the S-Bahn trunk line over tracks running parallel to the Munich–Augsburg railway, opened by the Munich–Augsburg Railway Company on 1 September 1839
- the S-Bahn trunk line from the approaches to Munich Central Station (Hauptbahnhof) to Munich East station, opened on 1 May 1971
- from Munich East to Ismaning over the Munich East–Ismaning railway, opened by the Royal Bavarian State Railways. The section through Ismaning was placed underground in 1992 and the section through Unterföhring station in 2005.
- from Ismaning to Munich Airport over a section of the Munich East–Munich Airport railway opened by Deutsche Bundesbahn in 1992.

S-Bahn services commenced in 1992 as S-Bahn line between Munich Airport and Pasing. It was later merged with line, which had previously run between Nannhofen (now Mammendorf) and Ismaning. Since December 2009, line has run from Pasing to Herrsching instead of Mammendorf, taking over a section of the former line from Herrsching to Ebersberg.

== Operation ==
1. Munich Airport – Herrsching
2. Munich Airport – Weßling
3. Munich East (Ostbahnhof) – Germering-Unterpfaffenhofen/Gilching-Argelsried (Monday to Friday only)

S8 (Munich)			Journey time (in min)		Station	Transfer	MVV tariff zone	S-Bahn service since	Image
1	2	3							
=== Freising district (Landkreis Freising) ===
			0	+2	Munich Airport Terminal	512 635	Farezone		
			2	+5	Munich Airport Besucherpark	512 635	Farezone		
			7	+7	Hallbergmoos	515 691 692 698	Farezone		
=== Munich district (Landkreis München) ===
			14	+4	Ismaning	X202 230 231 236 531	Farezone		
			18	+3	Unterföhring	189 232 233 234	Farezone		
=== Munich (München) ===
			21	+2	Johanneskirchen	154	Farezone		
			23	+2	Englschalking		Farezone		
			25	+4	Daglfing	183 188 189	Farezone		
			29	+2	Leuchtenbergring	S1 (Munich) S2 (Munich) S4 (Munich) S6 (Munich)	Farezone		
			31 (+2 min stop)	+2	Ostbahnhof	X30 145 190 191 213 N43 N44 N45 N74 N75	Farezone		
			35	+2	Rosenheimer Platz	Munich tramway 15 25	Farezone		
			37	+1	Isartor	132	Farezone		
			38	+2	Marienplatz	132	Farezone		
			40	+1	Karlsplatz	N40 N41 N45	Farezone		
			41	+2	Hauptbahnhof (tief)	X98	Farezone		
			43	+2	Hackerbrücke	Munich tramway 16 17	Farezone		
			45	+2	Donnersbergerbrücke	153	Farezone		
			47	+1	Hirschgarten	N43 N44 N78	Farezone		
			48	+3	Laim	130 151 168 N78	Farezone		
			51 (+2 min stop)	+2	Pasing	130 159 160 162 265 735 N77 N80 N81	Farezone		
			55	+3	Westkreuz	N77	Farezone		
			58	+1	Neuaubing	267 N80 N81	Farezone		
			59	+3	Freiham	143 N80	Farezone	2013	
=== Fürstenfeldbruck district (Landkreis Fürstenfeldbruck) ===
			62	+2	Harthaus	851 857	Farezone		
			64 (+1 min stop)	+4	Germering-Unterpfaffenhofen	X845 260 851 852 853 856 857 858 8500	Farezone		
=== Starnberg district (Landkreis Starnberg) ===
			69	+3	Geisenbrunn		Farezone		
			72	+2	Gilching-Argelsried	X900 X920 947 949 8500	Farezone		
			74	+3	Neugilching	947	Farezone		
			77	+4	Weßling (Oberbay)	X910 921 923 928 947 955	Farezone		
			81	+5	Steinebach	923 928	Farezone		
			86	+5	Seefeld-Hechendorf	820 924 928 950 8400	Farezone		
			91		Herrsching	921 928 950 951 9653	Farezone		
