= Geisenbrunn =

- Ortsteil of Gilching
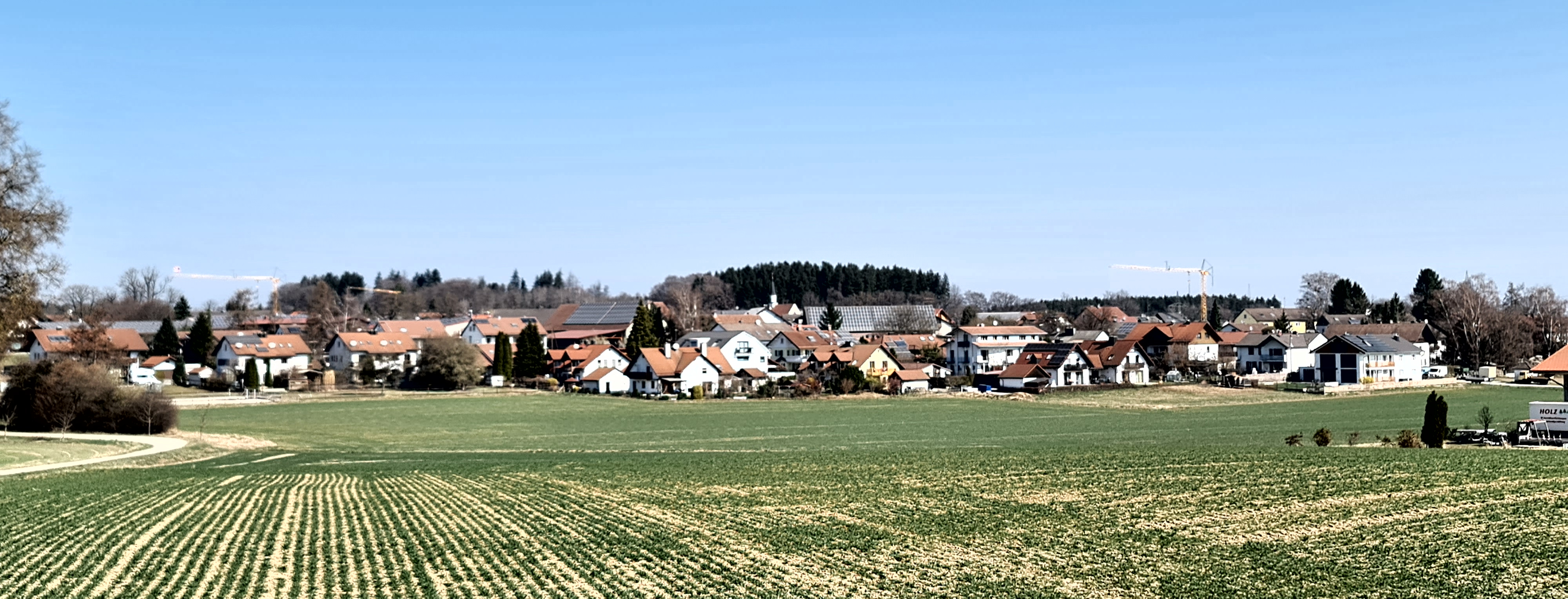
- Interactive map of Geisenbrunn
- Location within Germany Location within Bavaria
- Coordinates: 48°6′20″N 11°19′39″E
- Country: Germany
- State: Bavaria
- Admin. region: Oberbayern
- District: Starnberg
- Municipality: Gilching
- Elevation: 591 m (1,939 ft)

Population (2011)
  - Total: 1,300
- Time zone: UTC+01:00 (CET)
  - Summer (DST): UTC+02:00 (CEST)
- Postal codes: 82205
- Dialling codes: 08105
- Vehicle registration: STA

Geisenbrunn is a village in Bavaria, Germany and is located about 22 km southwest of Munich (centre). Since 1978 it is a part of the municipality Gilching which belongs to the district of Starnberg (Landkreis Starnberg).

== Economy and infrastructure ==
Geisenbrunn is close to the A96 (Bundesautobahn 96) and also a station of the suburban trainsystem of Munich (Munich S-Bahn). Line 8 stops in Geisenbrunn in the direction to “Herrsching” respectively the direction to “airport” (MUC) via Munich city center. Next to some handicraft enterprises, there is the restaurant Gaststätte Geisenbrunn which offers bavarian dishes and the Hotel am Waldhang with bed and breakfast located in Geisenbrunn. Geisenbrunn also has a municipal Kindergarten and its own volunteer fire brigade.

== Demography ==
The population of Geisenbrunn is about 1,275 people.

== Culture and sights ==
Geisenbrunn has a vital village life and due to several non-profit associations of Geisenbrunn there are some activities and little festivals throughout the year.

The most important activities are:

- Osterfeuer (in the Easternight)
- Maifeier (1 May, every three years a new maypole is erected)
- Dorfkirta (first weekend in July)
- Löschweiherfest (last Saturday in July)
- Weinfest (autumn)
- Glühweinfest (December)

Non-profit associations of Geisenbrunn are:

- Burschenschaft Geisenbrunn e.V.
- EC Planegg Geisenbrunn e.V.
- Förderverein Geisenbrunn e.V.
- Freiwillige Feuerwehr Geisenbrunn e.V.
- Fußballverein Gilching Geisenbrunn e.V.
- Hubertus Geisenbrunn-Argelsried e.V.
- Krokobär e.V.
- SC Gilching-Geisenbrunn e.V.
- Stopselverein Geisenbrunn e.V.
- Volksmusikfreunde Geisenbrunn e.V.

Next to the festivals there are some spots such as a little well with a bench next to it and a deer enclosure in the center of Geisenbrunn which is liked a lot by smaller children. Geisenbrunn also has a small Chapel “Maria Heimsuchung”.

Geisenbrunn has a small Chapel “Maria Heimsuchung” which the townspeople renovated themselves in 2024.
