= Stopper club =

Type of social club in Bavaria, Germany

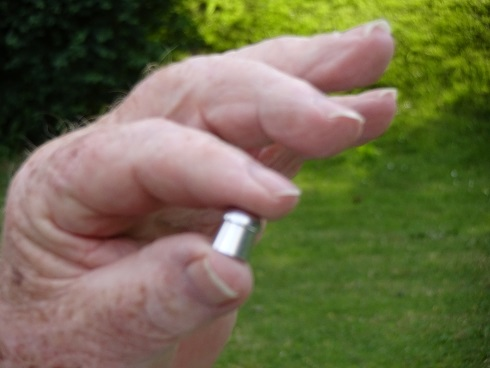
A member of a stopper club presents his stopper. In this specific case, the stopper is a custom-made approximately cylindrical object machined from metal, but stoppers made of cork or rubber are often used by other clubs.

Towns in which a local stopper club is recorded. In the background, the German state of Bavaria is highlighted, since nearly all stopper clubs in this state.

A stopper club (German Stopselclub) is a type of social club in Bavaria, Germany, the members of which always have to carry a bottle cork or stopper with them. Whenever two members of a club meet, each can challenge the other to show a stopper. A member who cannot, possibly having left it at home, has to pay a small fine. The money collected through these fines is typically used to buy beer at the next club meeting. Stopper clubs have existed in Bavaria at least since the middle of the twentieth century, and there are currently more than 100. Occasionally they support charitable projects.

Media related to Stopselclub at Wikimedia Commons
