= Germering =

- Town
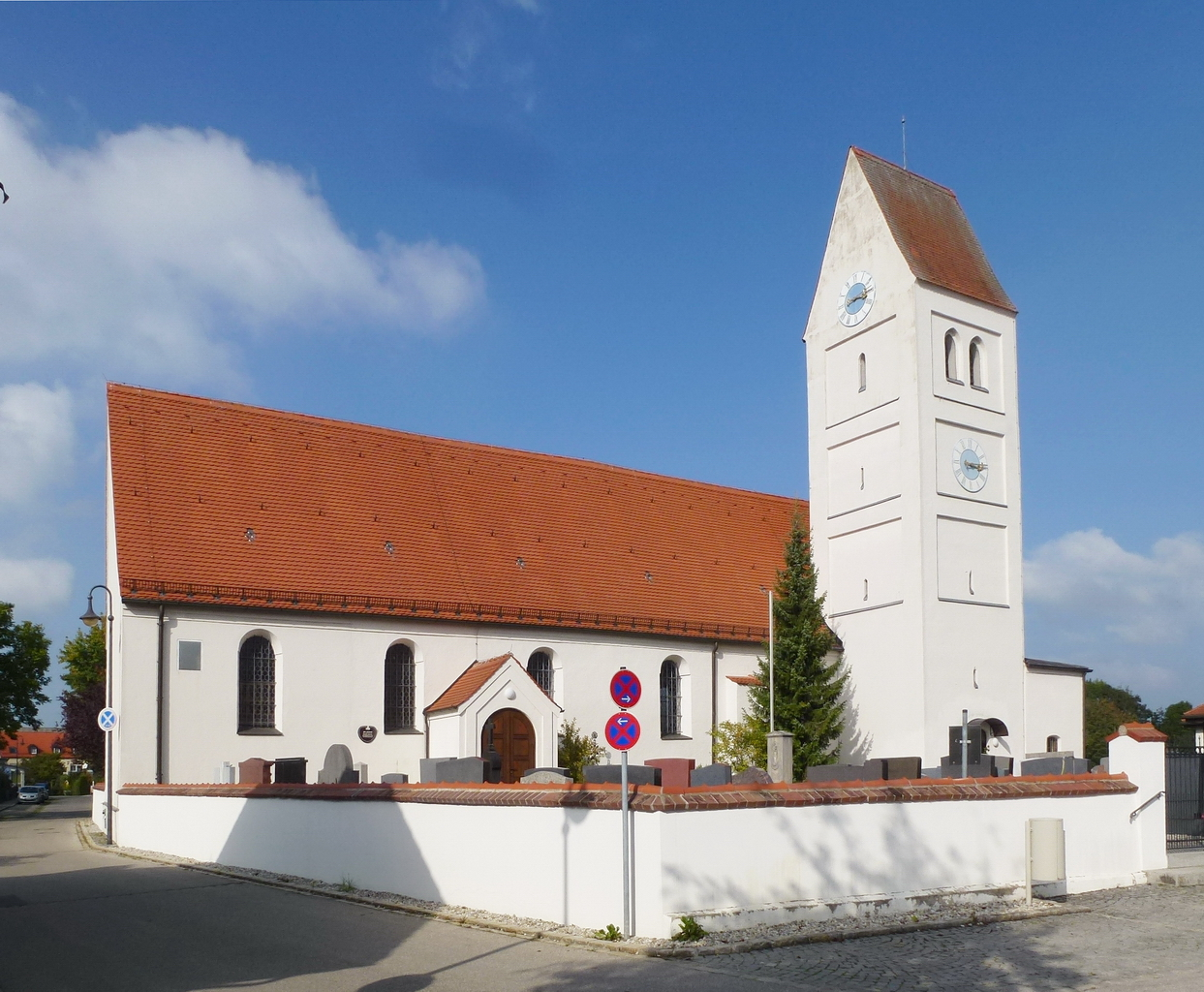
- Church of Saint Jacob

- Coat of arms

- Location of Germering within Fürstenfeldbruck district
- Interactive map of Germering
- Location within Germany Location within Bavaria
- Coordinates: 48°08′N 11°22′E
- Country: Germany
- State: Bavaria
- Admin. region: Oberbayern
- District: Fürstenfeldbruck

Government
  - Mayor (2026–32): Daniel Liebetruth (SPD)

Area
  - Total: 21.61 km^{2} (8.34 sq mi)
- Elevation: 535 m (1,755 ft)

Population (2025-12-31)
  - Total: 41,155
  - Density: 1,904/km^{2} (4,932/sq mi)
- Time zone: UTC+01:00 (CET)
  - Summer (DST): UTC+02:00 (CEST)
- Postal codes: 82101–82110
- Dialling codes: 089
- Vehicle registration: FFB
- Website: www.germering.de

Germering (German pronunciation: [ˈɡɛʁməʁɪŋ]; Central Bavarian: Geamaring) is a town of approximately 40,500 within the district of Fürstenfeldbruck, in Bavaria, Germany. It is directly adjacent to the city of Munich and borders it to the west.

== History ==
The area of Germering has an old history attested by findings of burial mounds of the New Stone Age and the Bronze Age, as well as a "villa rustica" (as in nearby Leutstetten) built by the Romans. There was a trade route through the city with numerous brick kilns. After their discovery a glass roof was erected over one (near the Nebelerstrasse) so one can still view it.

Germering was first reliably mentioned about 859-864 A.D. In those days it was still known as Kermeringon, but apparently it was formerly mentioned under the name Germana vel admonte. Unterpfaffenhofen, the south-west part of Germering, was first named in a charter dated 1190, but both villages remained small and rural until they experienced several significant increases in population during the 20th century.

During World War II, a subcamp of the Dachau concentration camp was located in the town.

In 1978, the two independent towns Unterpfaffenhofen and Germering were merged to form present-day Germering. The new city coat of arms was created in 1981 by Karl Haas, who incorporated the coats of arms of both former boroughs.

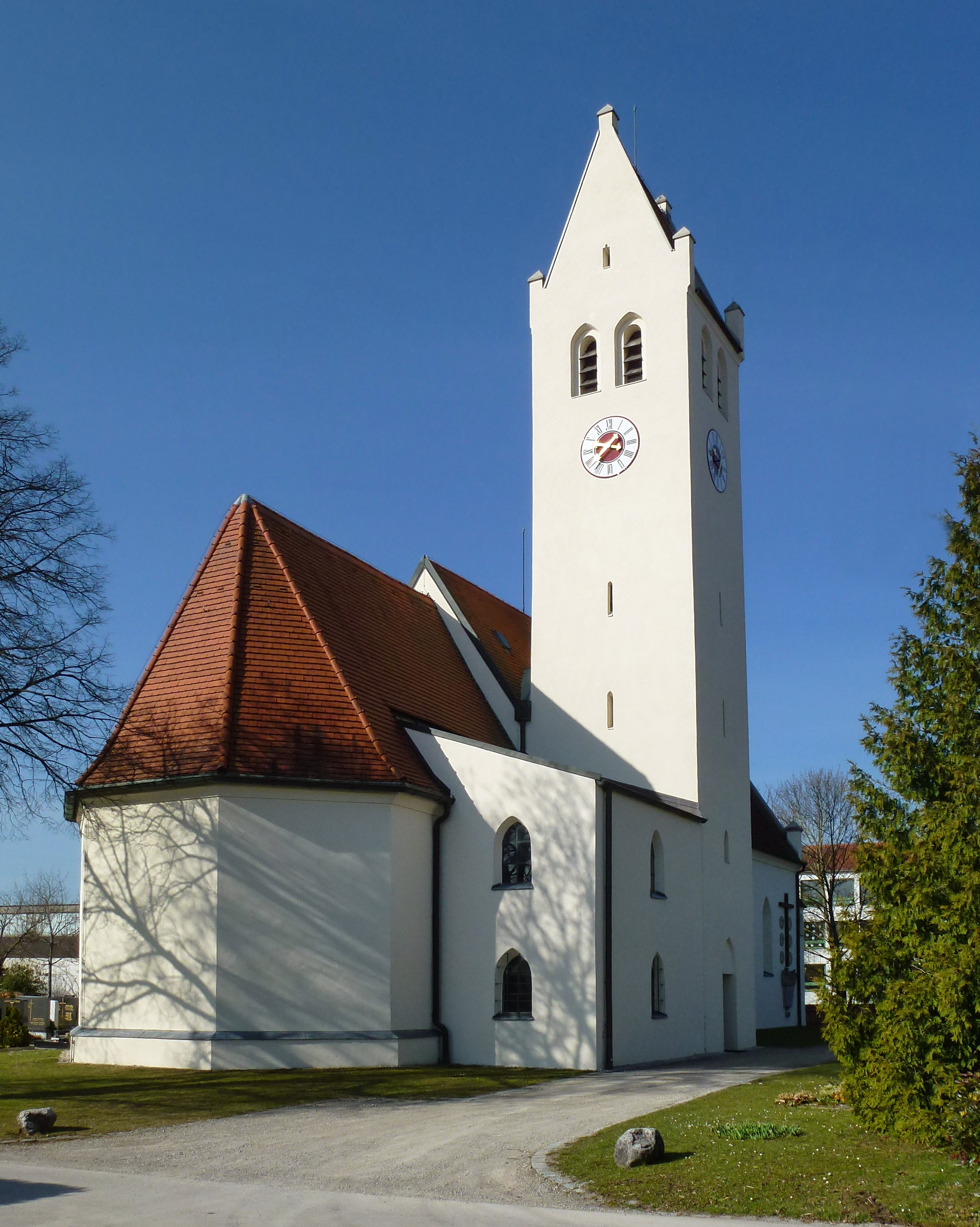
Germering St Martin church

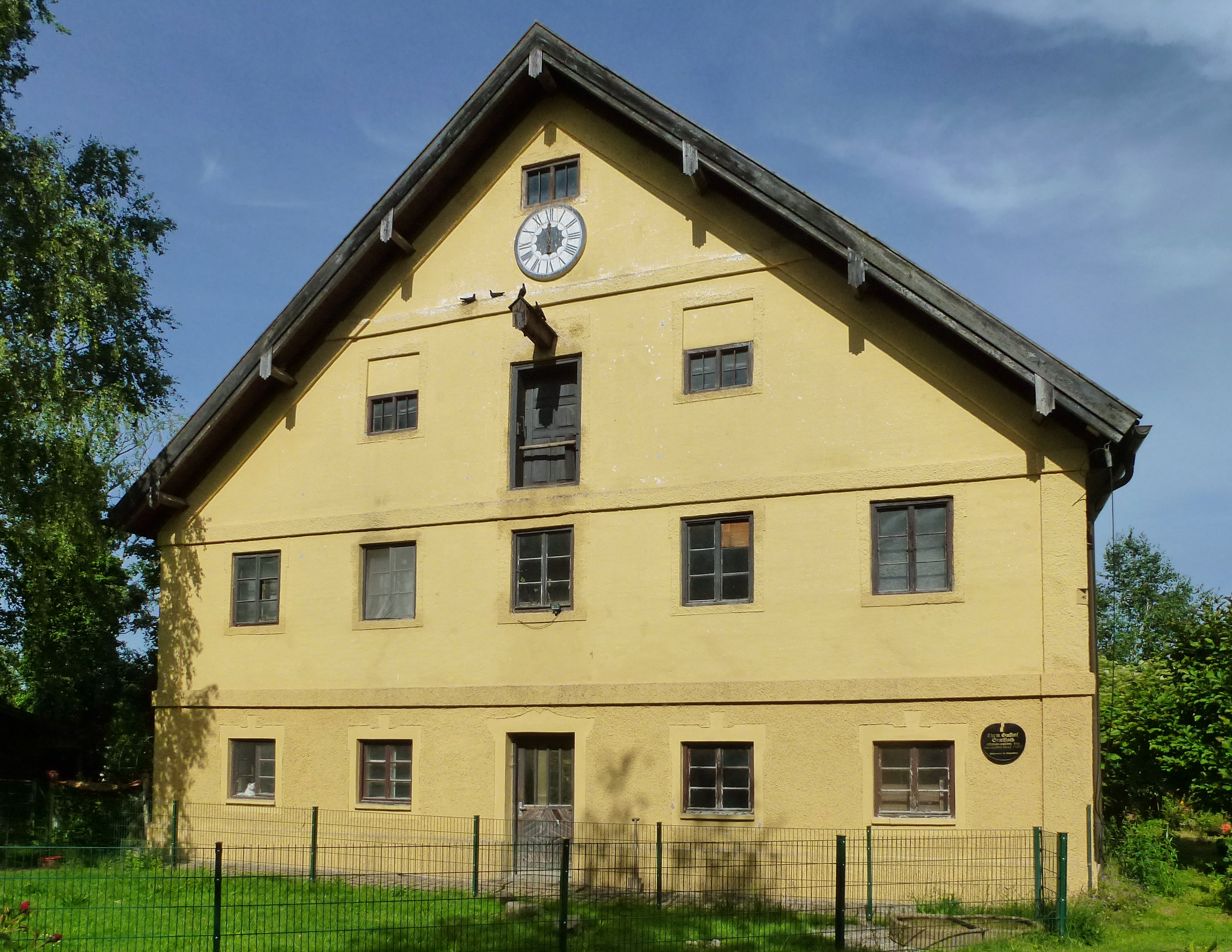
Germering-Streiflach former grange

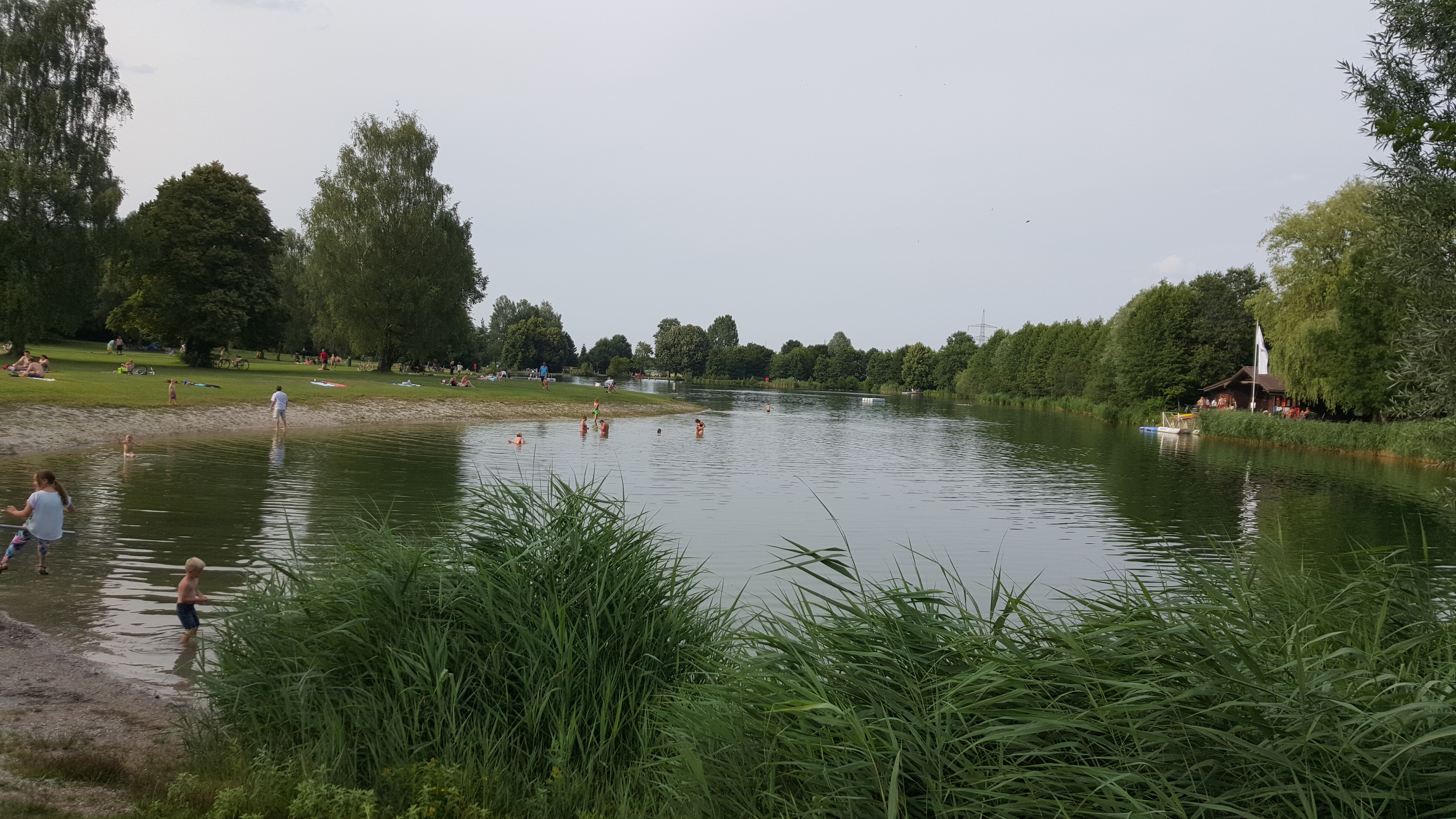
Germering lake

== Honorary citizens ==
- Claudia Hengst (born 1969), well-known disabled sportswoman and multiple gold medal winner at the Paralympics, world and European champion, honorary citizen since 2001
- Robert Huber (born 1937), residing in Germering, received the Nobel Prize for Chemistry in 1988 and was appointed honorary citizen in the same year

== Notable people ==
- Peter Brugger (born 1972), singer and guitarist, member of the Sportfreunde Stiller
- Lena Dürr, alpine skier, grew up in Germering
- Thomas Huber (born 1963), actor (including Lindenstrasse and The Great Bellheim)
- Carl Spitzweg (1808–1885), Biedermeier-era artist, born in the town-district Unterpfaffenhofen

=== Personalities who have worked on the ground ===
- Gus Backus (1937–2019) American singer, lived in Germering until his death
- Heinz Braun (1938–1986), painter, lived in Germering
- John Christopher Howland (1928–2013), singer, actor and entertainer, lived in Germering (Harthaus)
- Siegfried Lowitz (1914–1999), actor, lived in Germering
- Harry Thumann (1952-2001), synthesizer composer, founded his Country Lane Studios in Germering in 1973, and owned it until 1983.
- Erhard Wunderlich (1956–2012), handball player, silver medal winner at the Summer olympics 1984, lived in Germering
