= Gilching =

- Municipality
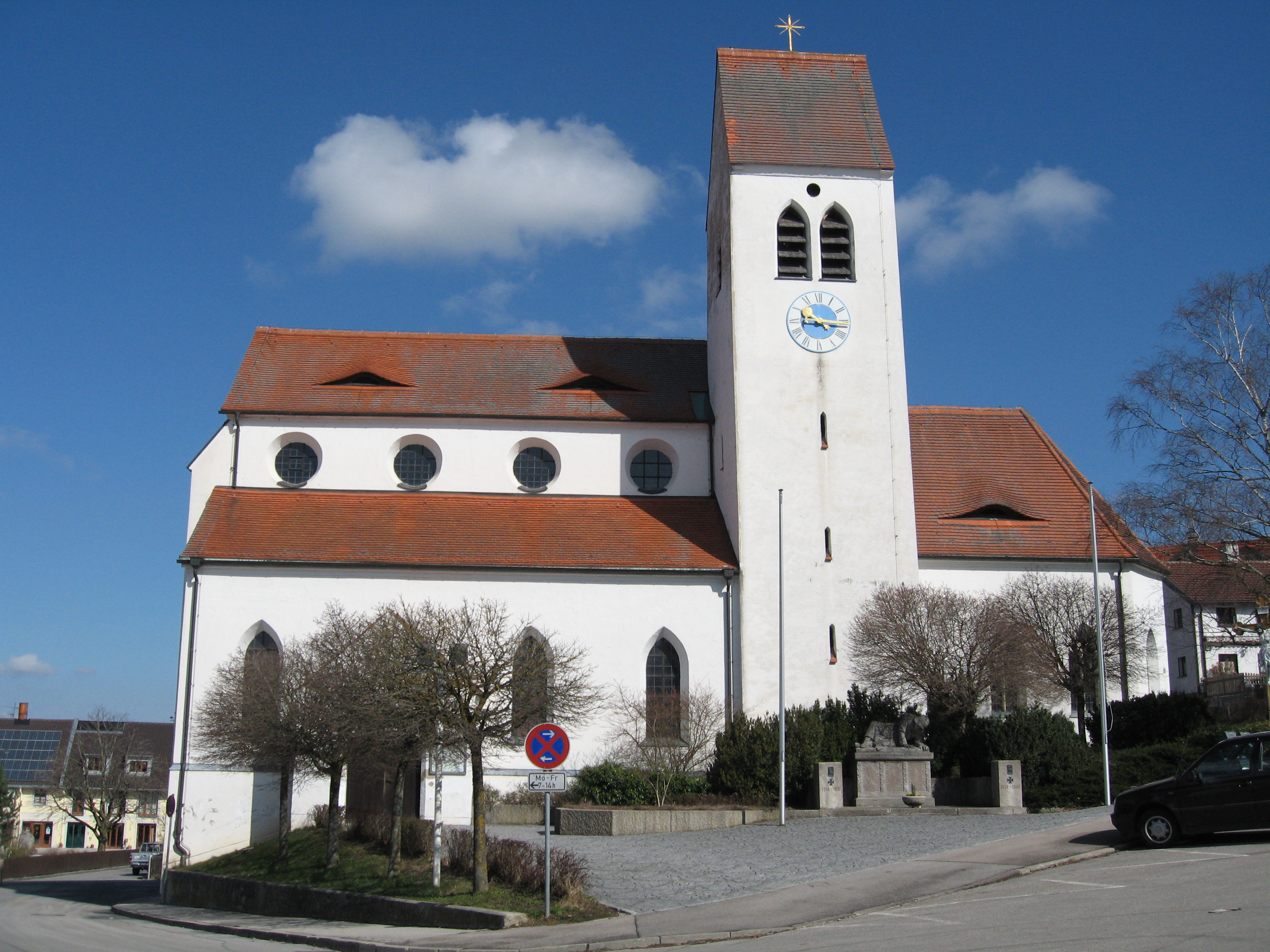
- Church of Saint Vitus

- Coat of arms

- Location of Gilching within Starnberg district
- Interactive map of Gilching
- Location within Germany Location within Bavaria
- Coordinates: 48°7′00″N 11°18′00″E
- Country: Germany
- State: Bavaria
- Admin. region: Oberbayern
- District: Starnberg

Government
  - Mayor (2020–26): Manfred Walter (SPD)

Area
  - Total: 31.5 km^{2} (12.2 sq mi)
- Elevation: 607 m (1,991 ft)

Population (2025-12-31)
  - Total: 19,159
  - Density: 608/km^{2} (1,580/sq mi)
- Time zone: UTC+01:00 (CET)
  - Summer (DST): UTC+02:00 (CEST)
- Postal codes: 82205
- Dialling codes: 08105
- Vehicle registration: STA
- Website: www.gilching.de

Gilching (German pronunciation: [ˈɡɪlçɪŋ]) is a municipality in the district of Starnberg, in Bavaria, Germany. It is situated 13 km north of Starnberg, and 22 km west of Munich (centre). The quarters Argelsried, Neugilching and Geisenbrunn belong to the municipality of Gilching. Gilching can be easily reached using the Munich area public transportation. One S-Bahn Railway Station is called "Neugilching" which is directly situated at the S8 line - formerly it was the S5 line - in the "Herrsching" direction.

== History ==
The Roman road Via Julia from Augsburg to Salzburg runs through Gilching. Celtic tumuli and nemetons are found in the nearby forest between Gilching and Schöngeising.

The parish church St. Vitus holds a bell, the Arnoldusglocke, the oldest extant bell of Germany. It was cast between 1180 and 1187, commissioned by minister Arnoldus.

== Twin towns ==
- Cecina, Italy, since 1989
