= Weßling (Oberbay) station =

Railway station in Bavaria, Germany

Weßling (Oberbay)
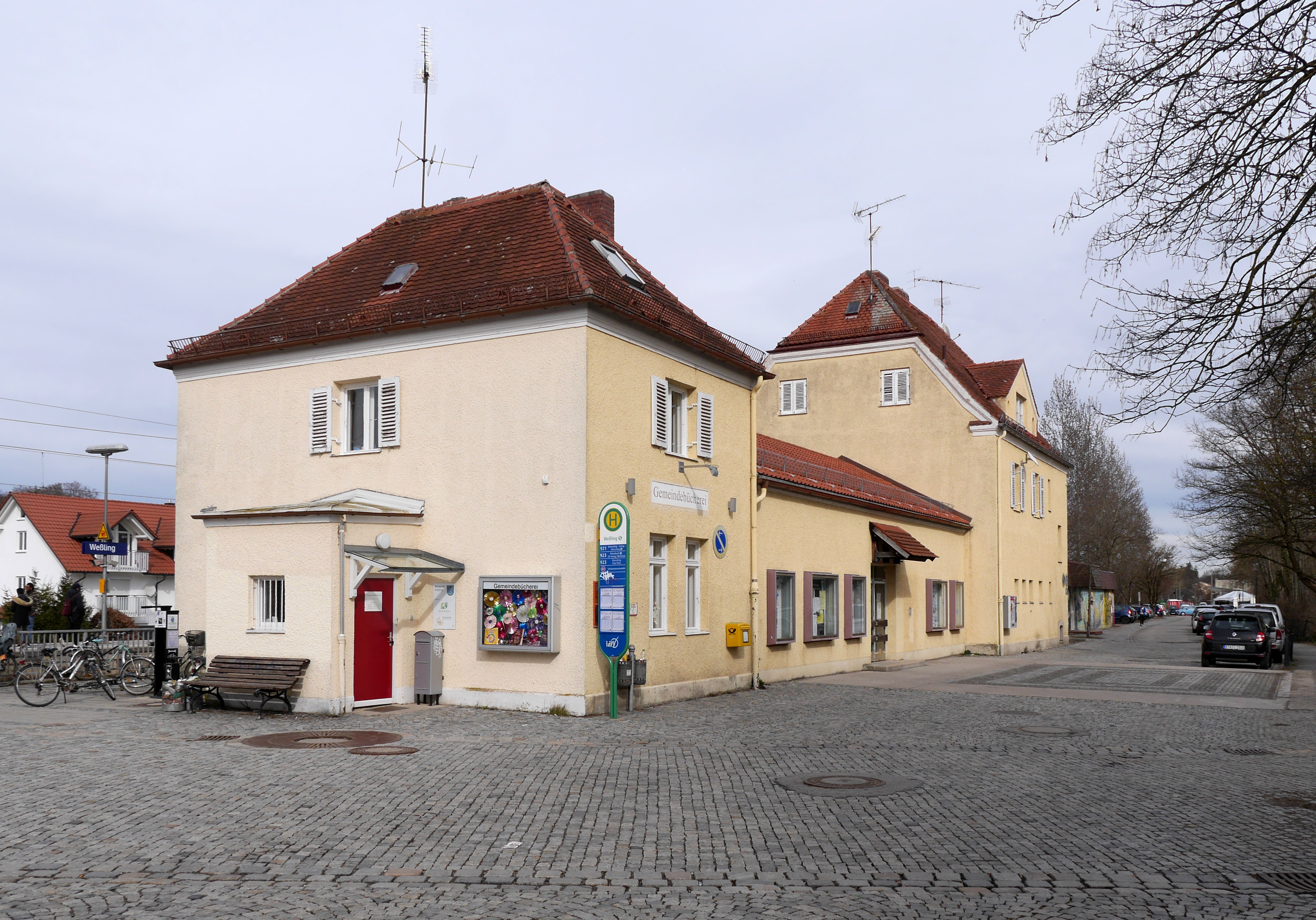
- 2019

General information
- Location: Bahnhofstraße 11; 82234 Weßling; Bavaria; Germany
- Coordinates: 48°04′38″N 11°15′04″E
- Elevation: 591 m (1,939 ft)
- System: Bf
- Owner: Deutsche Bahn
- Operator: DB Netz; DB Station&Service
- Lines: Munich–Herrsching railway (KBS 999.8)
- Platforms: 1 island platform
- Tracks: 2
- Train operators: S-Bahn München
- Connections: 921, 923, 955, 957, X910

Construction
- Parking: yes
- Accessible: no

Other information
- Station code: 6705
- DS100 code: MWS
- IBNR: 8006359
- Category: 5
- Fare zone: : 2 and 3
- Website: www.bahnhof.de

History
- Opened: 1 July 1903; 123 years ago

Services
Preceding station	Munich S-Bahn	Following station
Terminus	S5	Neugilching towards Kreuzstraße
Steinebach towards Herrsching	S8	Neugilching towards Flughafen
Location
- Location within Bavaria Location within Germany Location within Europe

Weßling (Oberbay) station is a railway station in the municipality of Weßling, located in the Starnberg district in Upper Bavaria, Germany.

== Notable places nearby ==
- Weßlinger See
