= Munich–Herrsching railway =

Railway line in Germany

Munich-Pasing–Herrsching
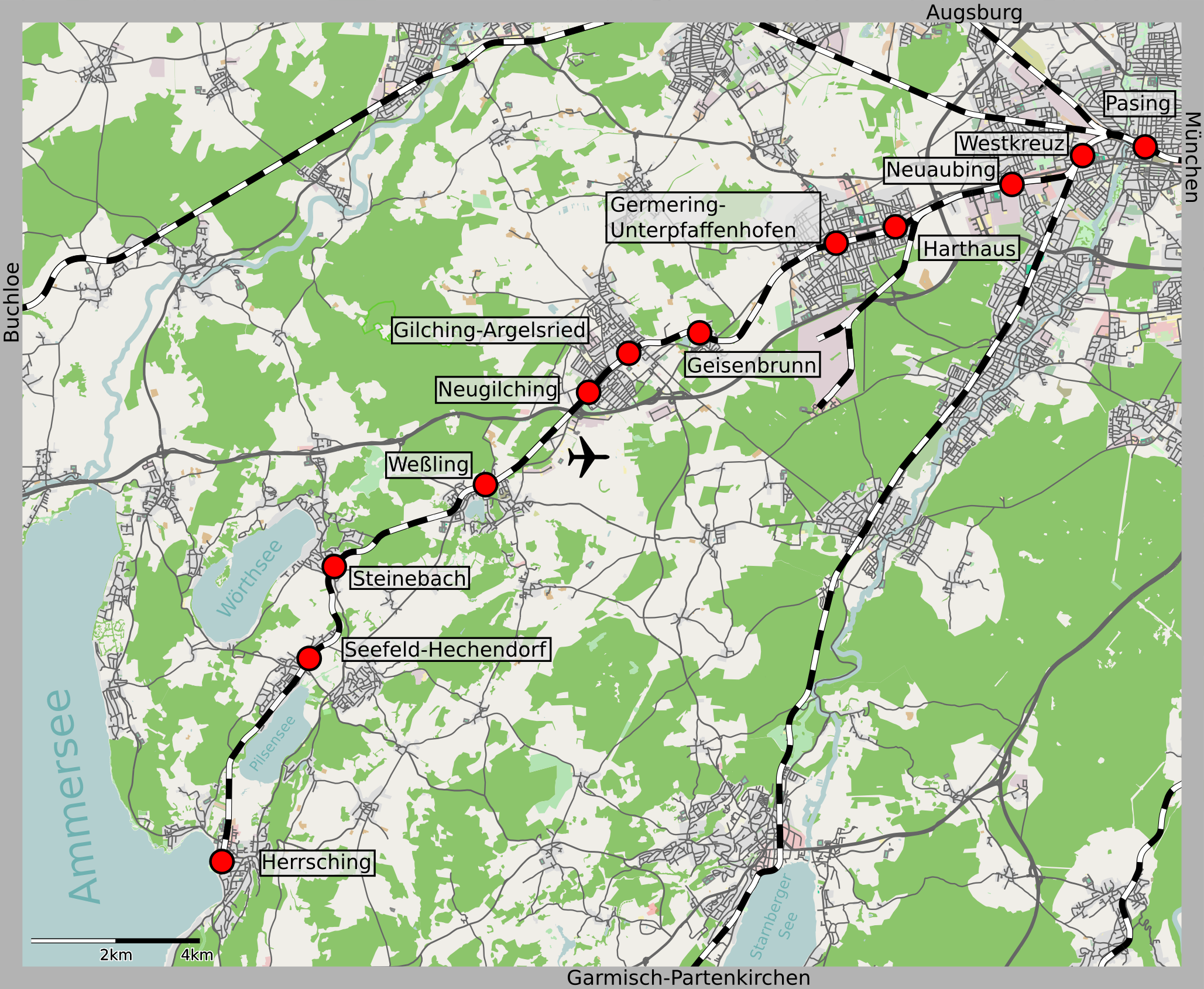

Overview
- Line number: 5541
- Locale: Bavaria, Germany

Service
- Route number: 999.8

Technical
- Track gauge: 1,435 mm (4 ft 8 1/2 in) standard gauge
- Electrification: 15 kV/16.7 Hz AC overhead
- Operating speed: 120 km/h (75 mph) (maximum)

The Munich–Herrsching railway is a branch line from Munich-Pasing to Herrsching in the German state of Bavaria. It is operated by DB Netz AG and is integrated into the Munich S-Bahn as part of line S8. The railway line is duplicated from Munich-Pasing to Weßling and electrified over its entire length.

== History ==
Before the line was built, there was long-standing disagreement concerning the course of the route between Weßling and Herrsching. There were variations running via Walchstadt, Schluifeld and Steinebach. Eventually, a route was chosen that ran between the Wörthsee villages of Steinebach and Auing with a station in Steinebach. The line from Munich to Herrsching opened on 1 July 1903. Initially, three pairs of passenger trains operated on the line daily. Although an additional holiday train ran in summer, the line often ran over capacity at this time of year. In 1903, it was the busiest branch line in the region with 126,275 annual passengers. Consequently, in 1913, the section from Pasing to Freiham was duplicated. In 1925, the line was electrified, allowing more frequent and faster trains to run on the line.

=== S-Bahn ===
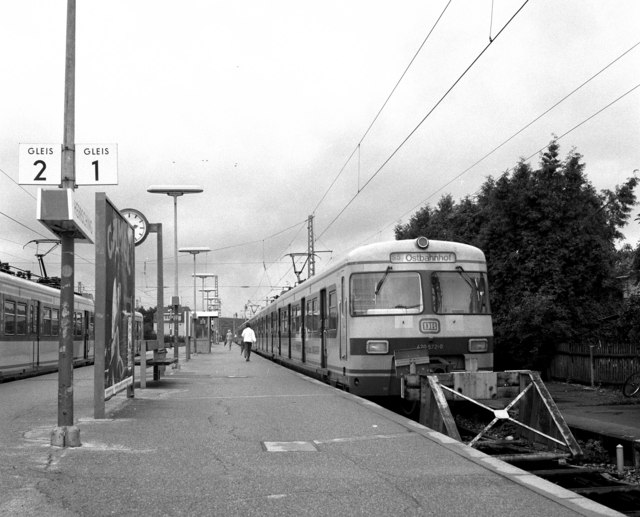
Herrsching station

Initial planning began as early as 1959 to rebuild the line for S-Bahn operations, but these plans were not carried out until the 1970s. Eventually, on 28 May 1972, the Munich S-Bahn opened and the line was integrated into the network. From 1972, services operated as line S5. In 1975, the passenger operations at Freiham station were abandoned due to low patronage. It remains active as an operations station for the siding to the Kraillinger Innovations-Meile industrial estate in Krailling.

In order to allow operations to run at 10-minute intervals across the whole line, Deutsche Bundesbahn decided to duplicate the line as part of the second phase of the Munich S-Bahn. Construction began in 1981 and the second track was opened between Freiham and Unterpfaffenhofen-Germering in 1984, following three years of work. The track was duplicated up to Weßling in 1985. The last section from Weßling to Herrsching remains single track only.

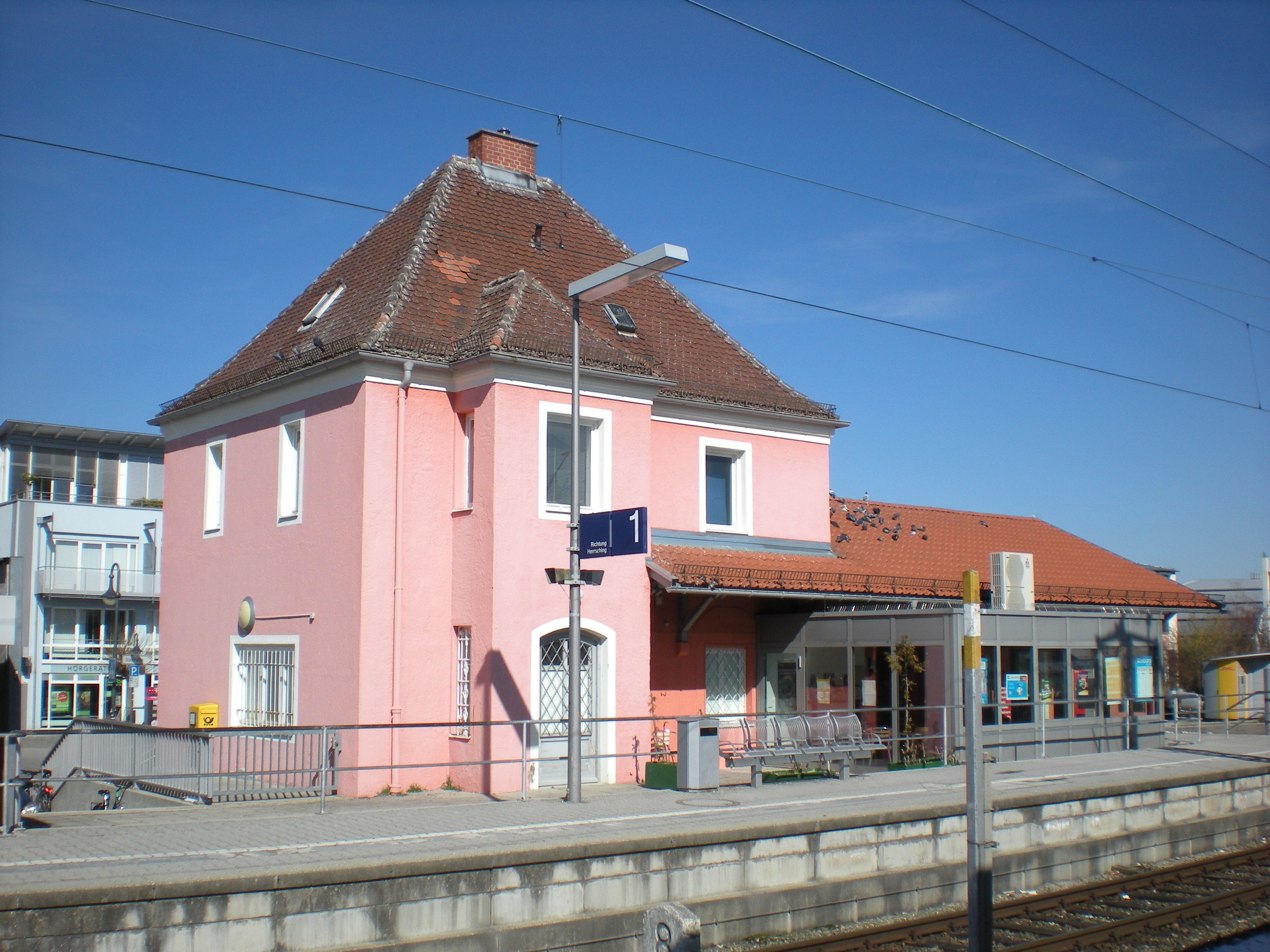
Germering-Unterpfaffenhofen station building

In 1992, Unterpfaffenhofen-Germering station was renamed Germering-Unterpfaffenhofen. Beginning with the 2009 timetable, the line S5 designation was abolished and the line has since been served by line S8.

Construction of a new station in the centre of Freiham began on 12 June 2012. This station is located about a kilometre east of the old Freiham station, which is no longer served by passenger trains. It was opened on 14 September 2013.

== Operations ==
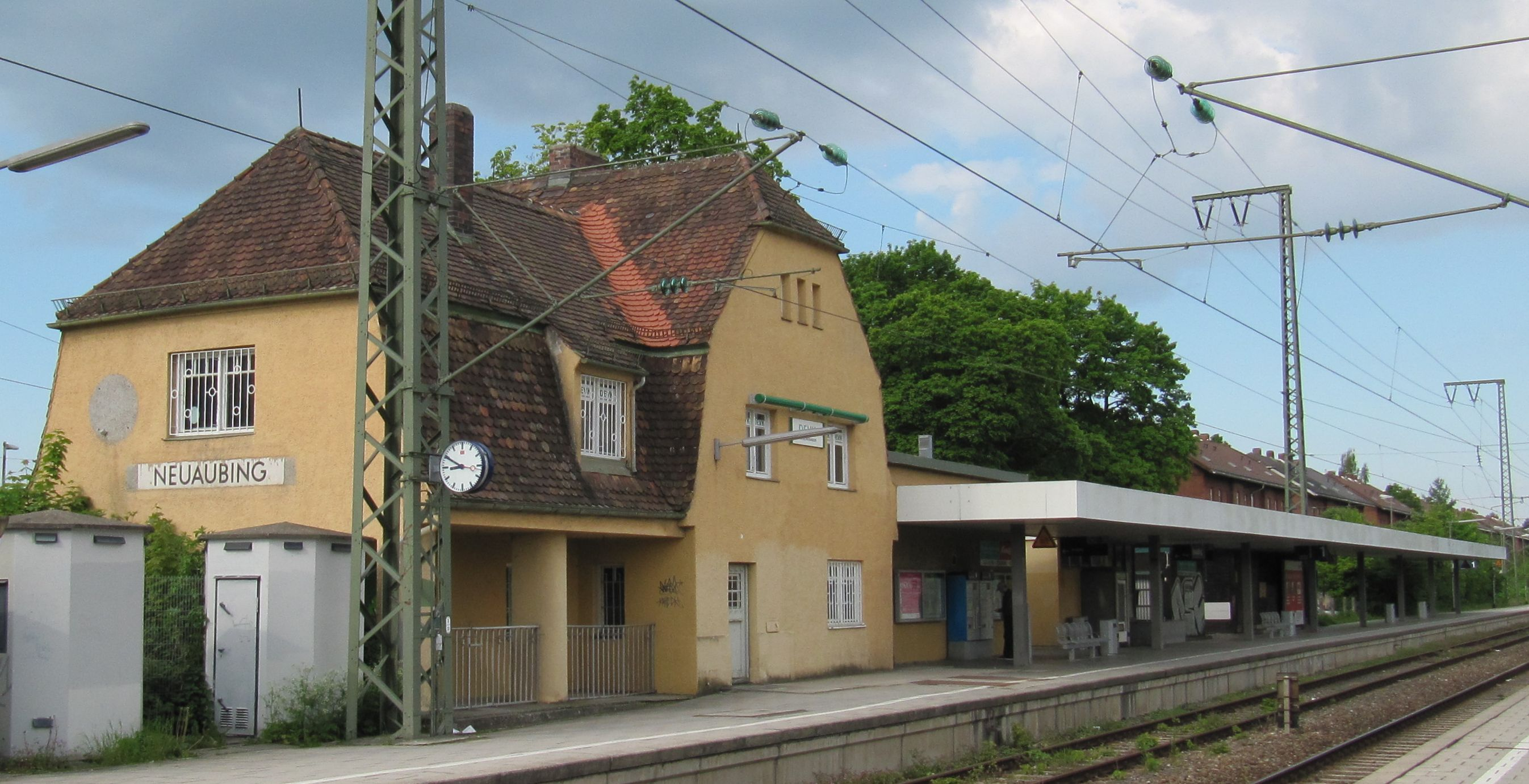
München-Neuaubing station

The Munich–Herrsching line today operates as part of S-Bahn line from Munich Airport to Herrsching with class 423 electric multiple units. In winter, the service runs at 20-minute intervals to Weßling, where one service an hour turns back, leaving two services an hour that continue to Herrsching. In summer, the entire route is served at 20-minute intervals. At peak times, additional services run from Munich East to Germering-Unterpfaffenhofen and Weßling at 20-minute intervals, running at 10-minute intervals overall on this section.
