= Herrsching station =

Railway station in Bavaria, Germany

Herrsching
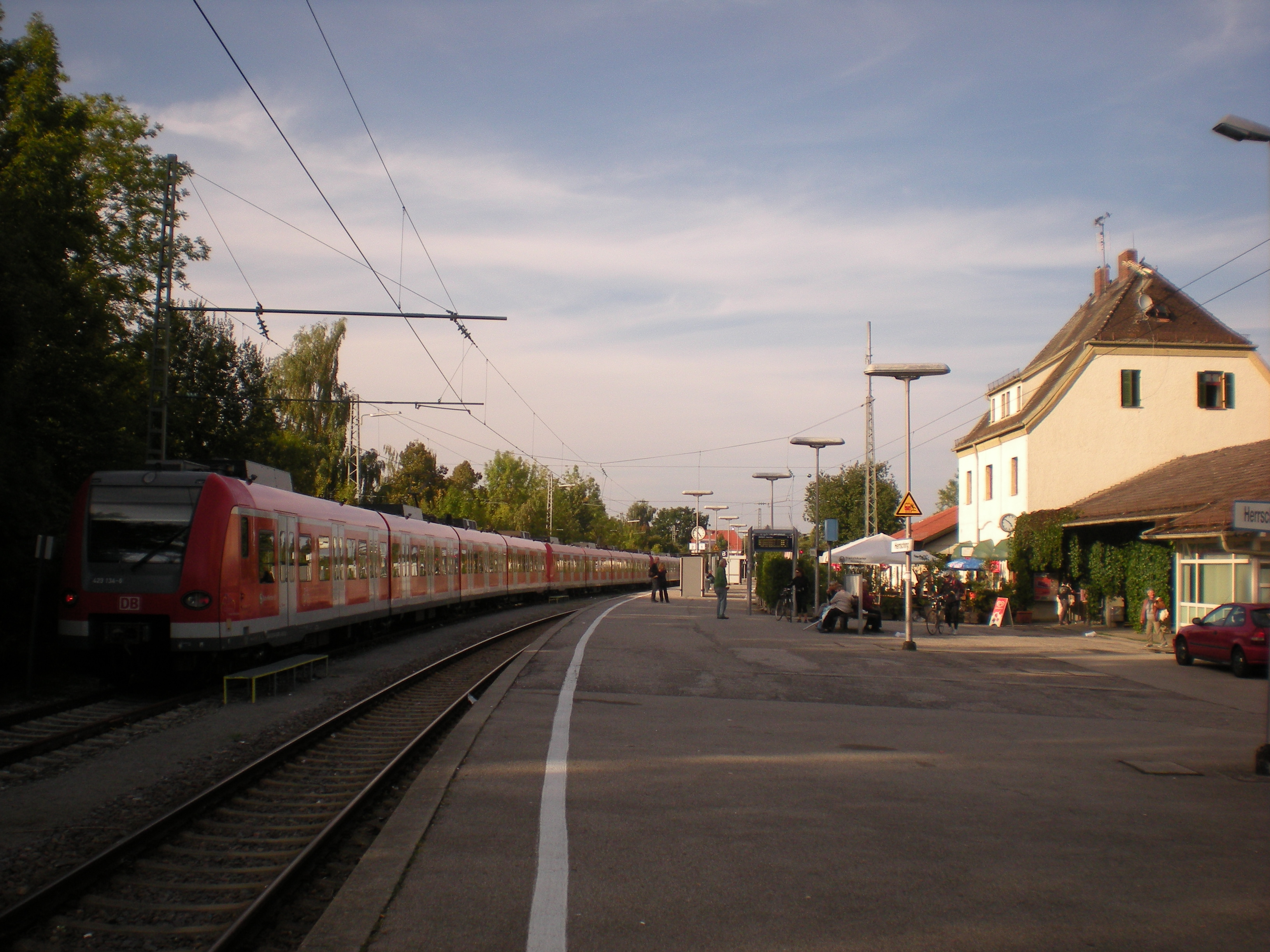
- 2012

General information
- Location: Bahnhofsplatz 1; 82211 Herrsching am Ammersee; Bavaria; Germany
- Coordinates: 47.9988°N 11.1706°E
- Elevation: 540 m (1,770 ft)
- Owner: Deutsche Bahn
- Operator: DB Netz; DB Station&Service
- Lines: Munich–Herrsching railway (KBS 999.8)
- Platforms: 1 island platform
- Tracks: 3
- Train operators: S-Bahn München
- Connections: 921, 950, 951, 953, 958, 928V, 8400

Construction
- Parking: yes
- Cycle facilities: yes
- Accessible: yes

Other information
- Station code: 2732
- DS100 code: MHI
- IBNR: 8002792
- Category: 5
- Fare zone: : 3 and 4
- Website: www.bahnhof.de

History
- Opened: 1 July 1903; 123 years ago
- Electrified: 8 August 1925; 101 years ago

Services
| Preceding station | Munich S-Bahn | Following station |
|---|---|---|
| Terminus | S8 | Seefeld-Hechendorf towards Flughafen |
Location
- Location within Bavaria Location within Germany Location within Europe

Herrsching station is a railway station on the Munich S-Bahn in the town of Herrsching am Ammersee in the southwest area of Munich, Germany. It is served by the S-Bahn line S8.

== Notable places nearby ==
- Ammersee
