= Hallbergmoos station =

Railway station in Germany

Hallbergmoos
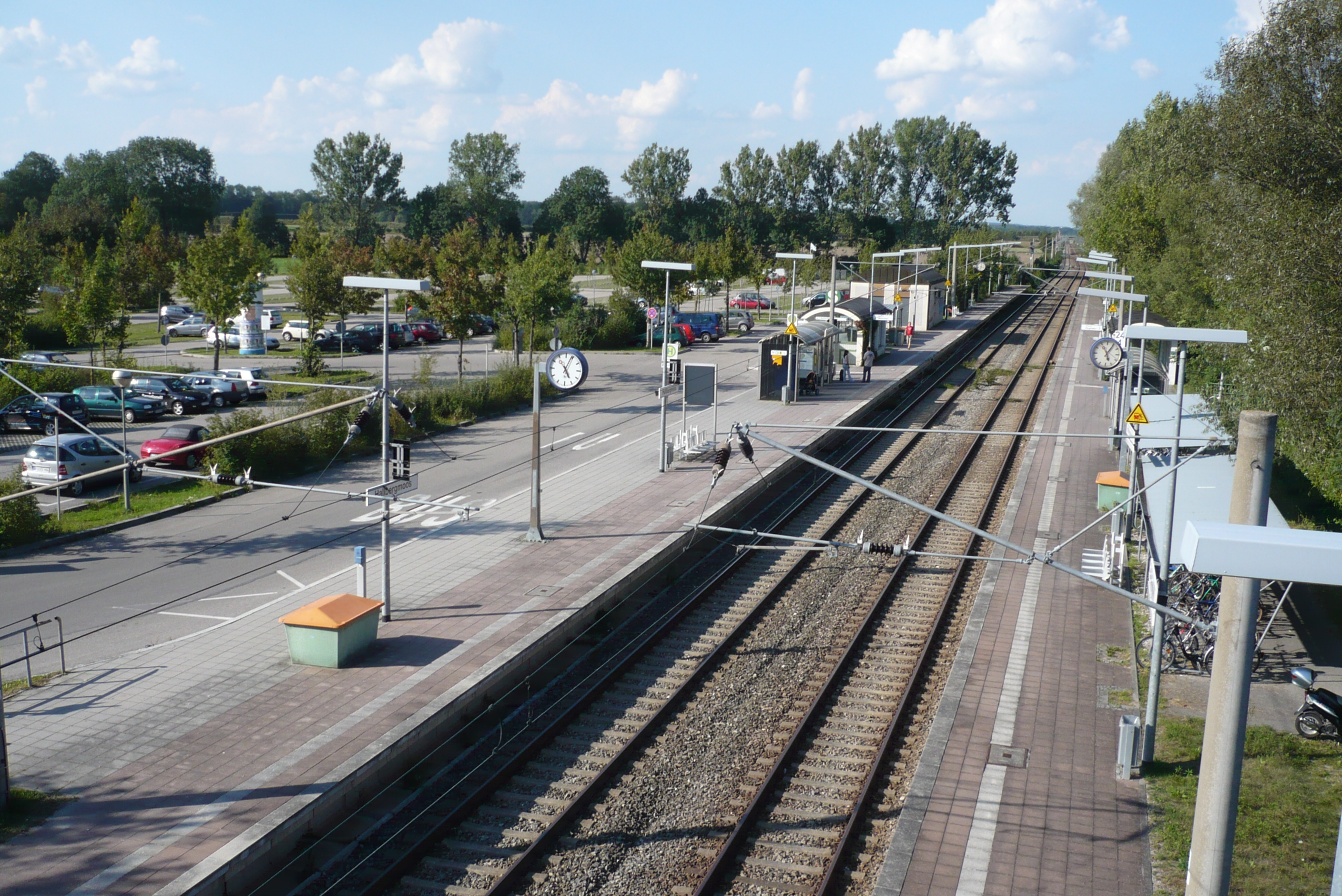

General information
- Location: Am Bahnhof; 85399 Hallbergmoos; Bavaria; Germany
- Coordinates: 48.3092°N 11.7142°E
- Owner: Deutsche Bahn
- Operator: DB Netz; DB Station&Service
- Line: Munich East–Munich Airport railway
- Platforms: 2 side platforms
- Tracks: 2
- Train operators: S-Bahn München
- Connections: 515, 691, 692, 698

Other information
- Station code: 2497
- DS100 code: MHMO
- IBNR: 8002534
- Category: 5
- Fare zone: : 3 and 4
- Website: www.bahnhof.de

History
- Opened: 7 March 1992

Services
| Preceding station | Munich S-Bahn | Following station |
|---|---|---|
| Ismaning towards Herrsching | S8 | Munich Airport Besucherpark towards Flughafen |
Location
- Location within Bavaria Location within Germany Location within Europe

Hallbergmoos station is a railway station on the Munich S-Bahn in the town of Hallbergmoos in the northeast area of Munich, Germany. It is served by the S-Bahn line S8.
