= Munich-Johanneskirchen station =

Railway station in Germany

München Johanneskirchen
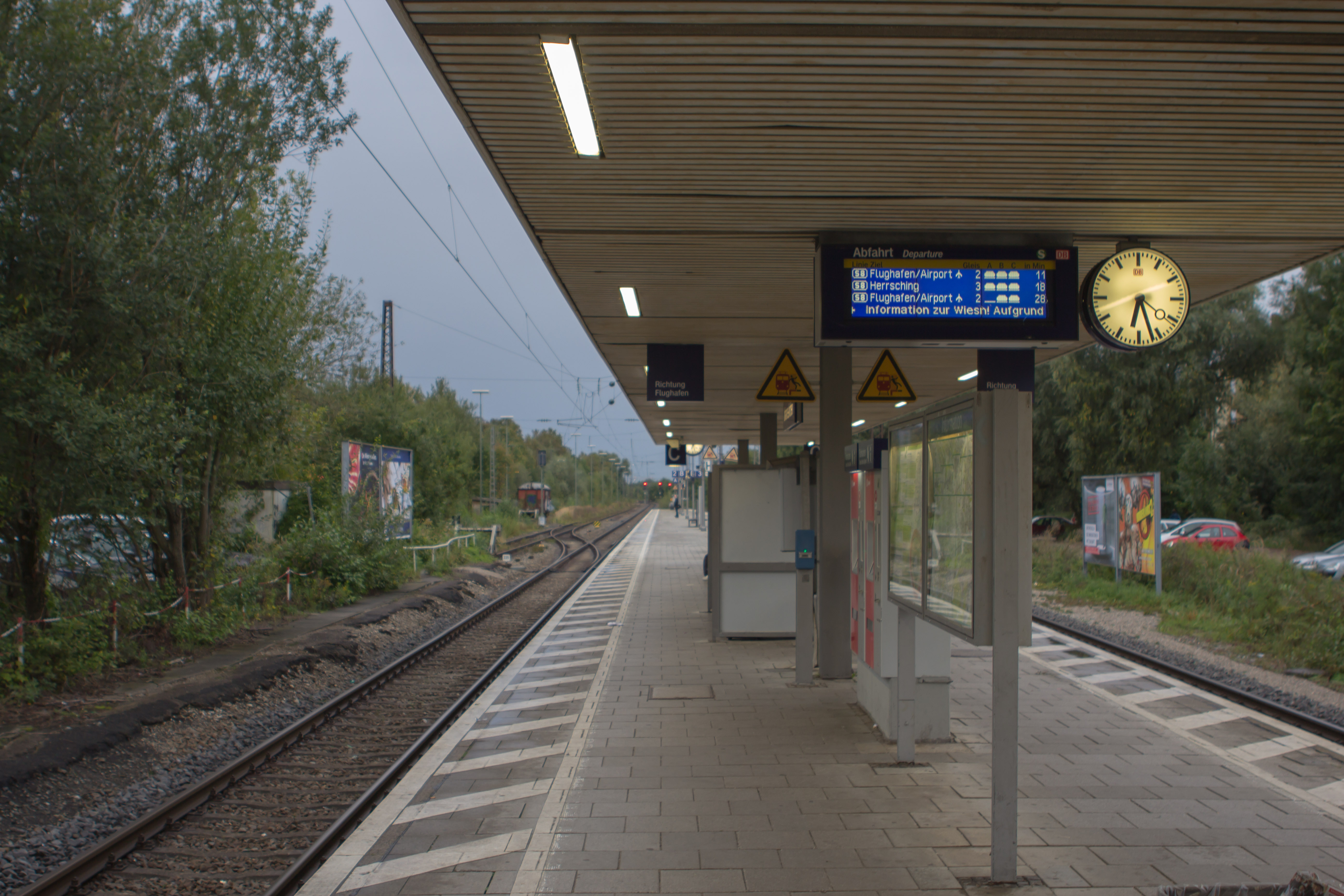
- The station in 2012

General information
- Location: Musenbergstr. 80997 Munich; Bavaria; Johanneskirchen; Germany
- Coordinates: 48.168224°N 11.645873°E
- Owner: Deutsche Bahn
- Operator: DB Netz; DB Station&Service
- Line: Munich East–Munich Airport railway
- Platforms: 1 island platform
- Tracks: 2
- Train operators: S-Bahn München
- Connections: 154

Construction
- Parking: yes
- Cycle facilities: yes
- Accessible: no

Other information
- Station code: 4256
- DS100 code: MJK
- IBNR: 8004149
- Category: 5
- Fare zone: : M
- Website: www.bahnhof.de

History
- Opened: 5 June 1909; 117 years ago

Services
Preceding station	Munich S-Bahn	Following station
Englschalking towards Herrsching	S8	Unterföhring towards Flughafen
Location

München-Johanneskirchen station is a Munich S-Bahn railway station in the borough of Bogenhausen, Munich. It is served by the S-Bahn line S8.
