= MAEX =

The MAEX (MunichAirportEXpress) is an alternative solution to the Transrapid required by the Munich city government for a fast train connection between Munich main station and the Munich airport.

== Concept ==
The MAEX is an express S-train, and is designed to be routed from Munich's main railway station through the second main tunnel, on the current S8 train route East of the city, the Munich East-Munich Airport railway, to the airport. In addition to the two stops in the second main tunnel route, at the main station and Marienplatz, there will be an additional two stops at the Leuchtenbergring as well as in Unterföhring and Ismaning.

For the realization of this route, the four-track expansion of the Munich North Ring in the Daglfing-Johanneskirchen area is required in addition to the changes in the second main tunnel. This is to be done in the tunnel, in order to completely separate road traffic from the increasing railway traffic by eliminating the railroad transitions in Daglfing and Englschalking and, to protect the residential areas from noise and to eliminate the separation effect of the railway line.

The journey time of the MAEX, on the approx. 35 km long stretch between Munich main station and airport therefore would reduce the current travel time by about 15 minutes. The total cost of the project is estimated at €860 million, which includes the costs of further measures going beyond the MAEX. The MAEX costs alone are stated at €625 million (not including the second main tunnel).

Shortly after the publication of the project idea, Deutsche Bahn secured the trademark rights to MAEX. The city of Munich then suggested to pursue the plans under the name MEXpress instead.
