= Therese Wagner =

German businessperson (1797–1858)

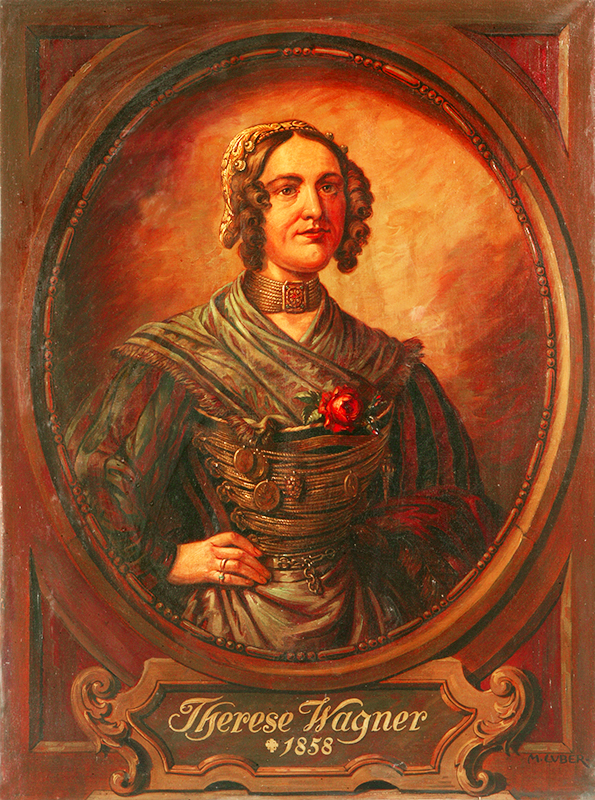

Therese Wagner (1797-1858), was a German businessperson.

She was the owner of the Augustiner-Bräu in 1846–1858.

A street in Freiham, a district in the west of Munich, was named after her in 2020.
