= Unterföhring station =

Railway station in Germany

Unterföhring
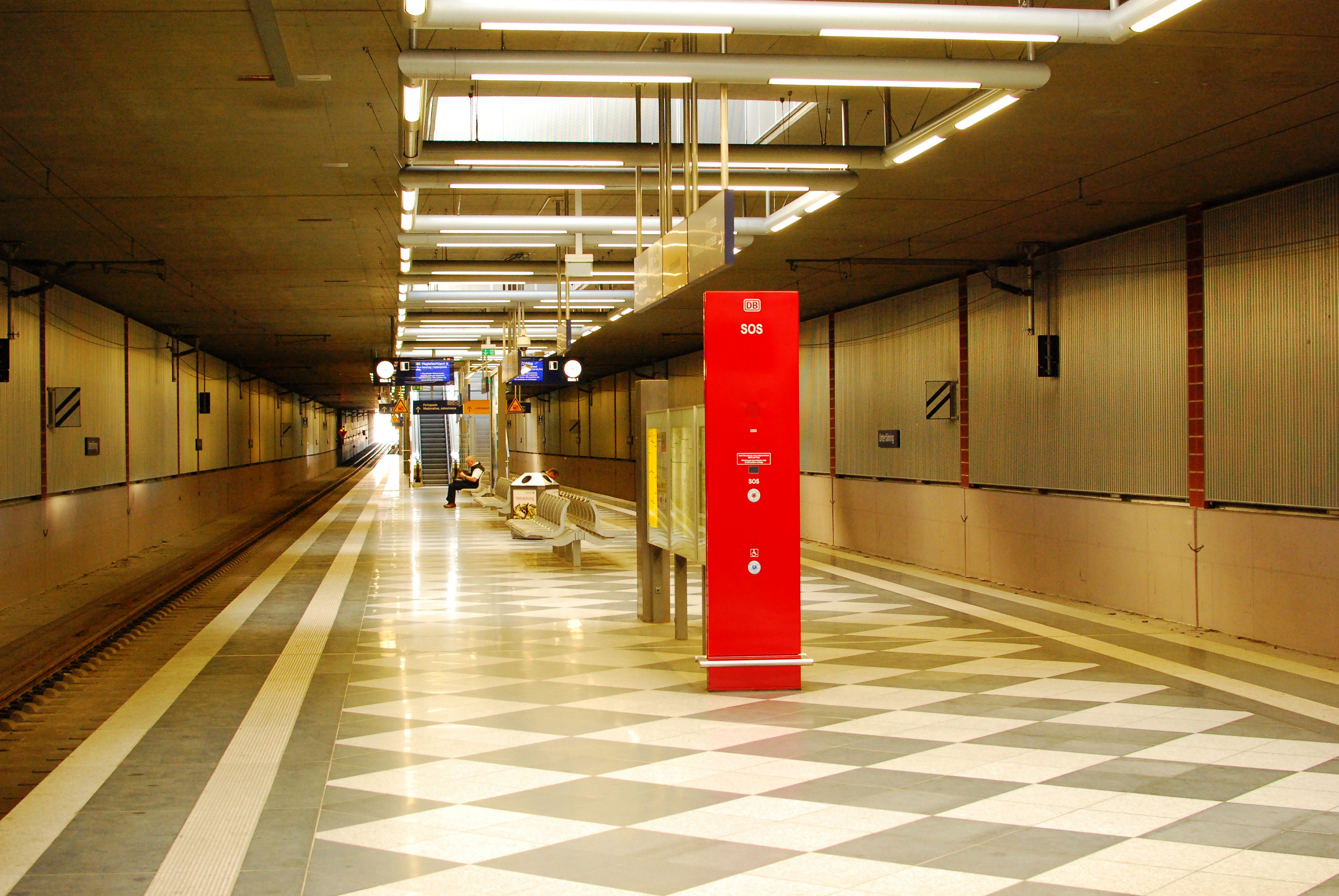
- 2013

General information
- Location: Am Bahnhof; 85774 Unterföhring; Bavaria; Germany
- Coordinates: 48.1902°N 11.6468°E
- Owner: Deutsche Bahn
- Operator: DB Netz; DB Station&Service
- Line: Munich East–Munich Airport railway
- Platforms: 1 island platform
- Tracks: 2
- Train operators: S-Bahn München
- Connections: 189, 232, 233, 234

Other information
- Station code: 6346
- DS100 code: MUFG
- IBNR: 8005986
- Category: 4
- Fare zone: : M and 1
- Website: www.bahnhof.de

History
- Opened: 5 June 1909

Services
Preceding station	Munich S-Bahn	Following station
Johanneskirchen towards Herrsching	S8	Ismaning towards Flughafen
Location

Unterföhring station is a railway station on the Munich S-Bahn in the town of Unterföhring in the northeast area of Munich, Germany. It is served by the S-Bahn line S8.
