= Munich-Englschalking station =

Railway station in Munich, Germany

München Englschalking
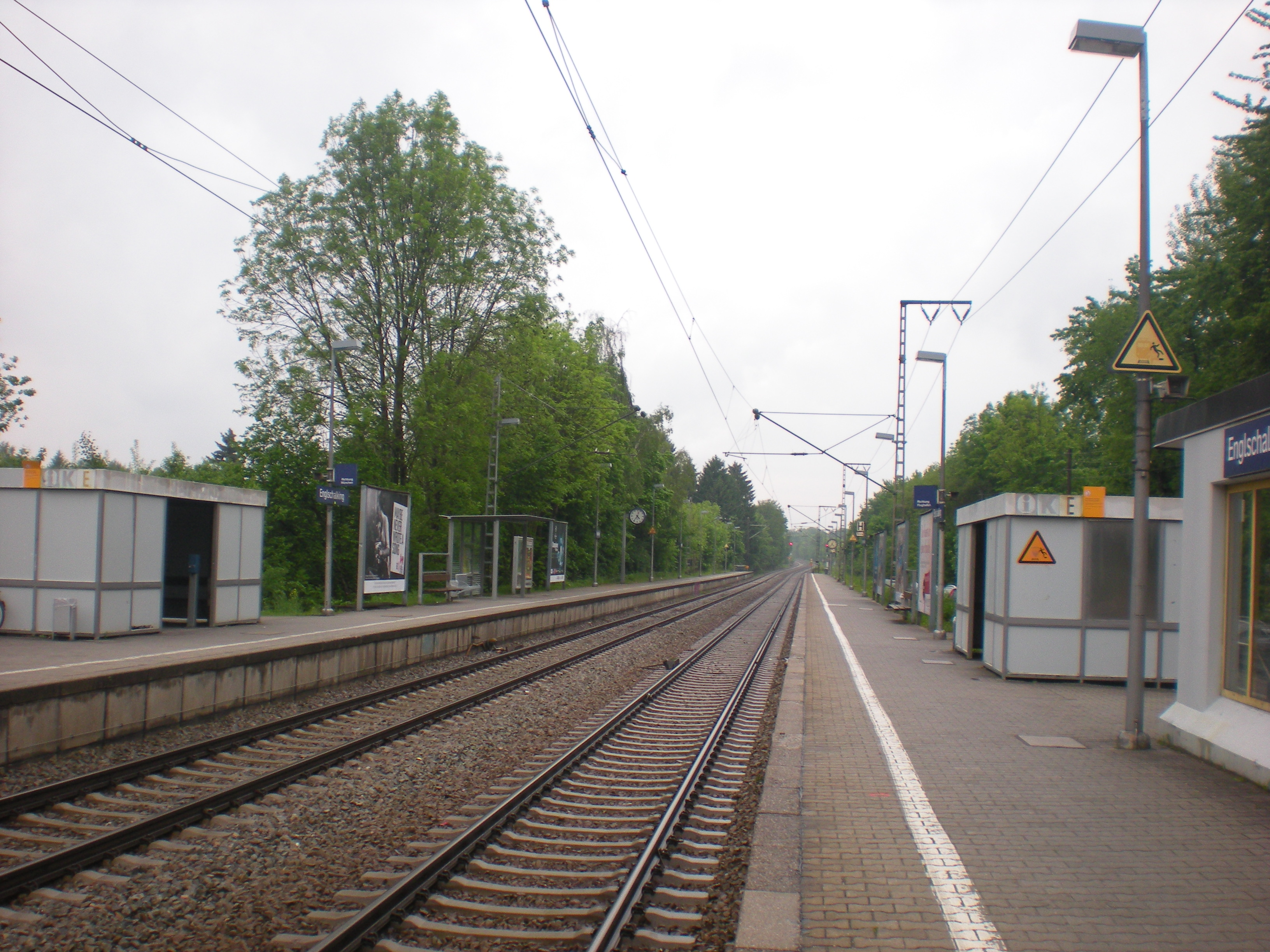
- 2012

General information
- Location: Brodersenstraße/Seidleinweg; 81925 Munich; Bogenhausen, Bavaria; Germany
- Coordinates: 48°09′24″N 11°38′54″E
- Owner: Deutsche Bahn
- Operator: DB Netz; DB Station&Service
- Lines: Munich East–Munich Airport (S8) (KBS 999.8)
- Platforms: 2 side platforms
- Tracks: 2
- Train operators: S-Bahn München

Construction
- Parking: yes
- Cycle facilities: yes
- Accessible: no

Other information
- Station code: 4250
- DS100 code: MEGS
- Category: 5
- Fare zone: : M
- Website: www.bahnhof.de

History
- Opened: 9 July 1911; 115 years ago

Services
Preceding station	Munich S-Bahn	Following station
Daglfing towards Herrsching	S8	Johanneskirchen towards Flughafen
Location

Munich-Englschalking is a Munich S-Bahn station on the Munich East–Munich Airport railway in the borough of Bogenhausen.

== Future development ==
There are a number of development plans for the railway station and its vicinity.

=== U-Bahn extension ===
An extension of the Munich U-Bahn line U4 from Arabellapark is planned to connect the station with Munich's U-Bahn network. Due to budget considerations, an alternative Stadtbahn line is also considered.

=== Munich Airport Express ===
As the Munich city government is opposed to plans of the Bavarian government to build a Transrapid mag-lev line from München Hauptbahnhof to the Airport, it has proposed an alternative Express S-Bahn, MAEX, that should run along the tracks of the current S8 S-Bahn line. To achieve a fast connection of airport and central station, the construction of a tunnel along the current tracks of the S8 has been proposed.

=== Englschalking grade crossing ===
Independent of the city government's plans, Deutsche Bahn is considering the construction of a short S-Bahn tunnel to make the grade crossing at the station redundant as it constantly leads to traffic jams. Also, the long waiting times at the crossing hamper the development of the districts east of the railway line. Alternatively, a bridge construction is considered.
