= Freihamer Allee =

Street in Munich, Germany

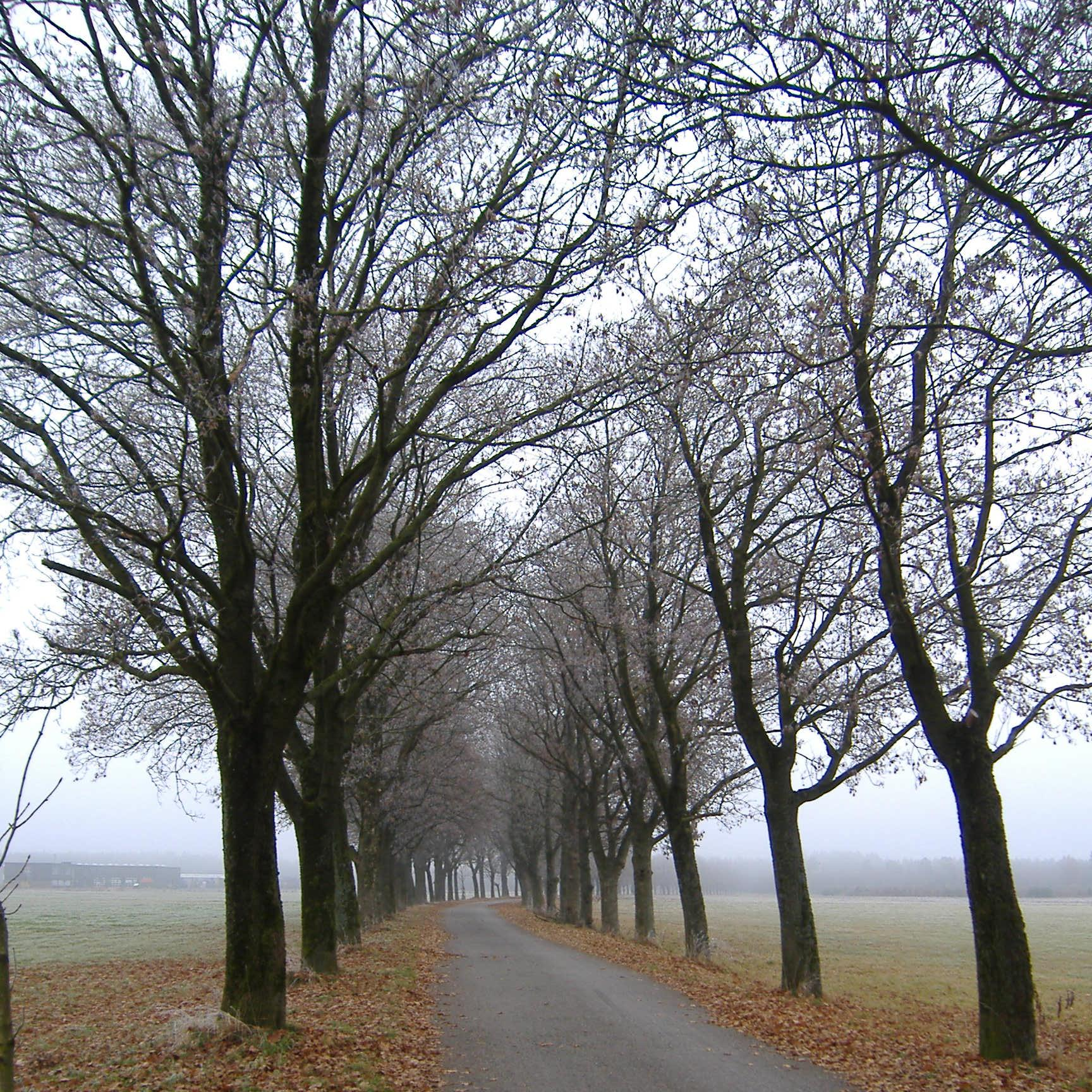
Freihamer Allee after the Freiham estate towards Gräfelfing

The Freihamer Allee is an avenue in the Munich district of Aubing, in the area of the Freiham estate, which was probably created in the 17th century.

== Route ==
The Freihamer Allee starts at the Bodenseestraße (Bundesstraße 2) and goes under the railway line Munich-Herrsching, before passing through the Freiham estate. Directly south of the railway line, the Wattplatz branches off to the west, which leads to the station Munich-Freiham. South of the Freiham estate, Centa-Hafenbrädl-Straße connects to the Freiham development area and flows from the east into the avenue. Then the Freihamer Allee runs south and is designed as an avenue. It continues in the direction of Gräfelfing and is interrupted by the Bundesautobahn 96 (Munich-Lindau), which is slightly offset to the east and crossed by a pedestrian bridge. At the city boundary to Gräfelfing, in the Gräfelfinger wood meadows, it turns into the Freihamer Straße.

Until 2013, it crossed the Munich-Herrsching railway line via a level crossing that was controlled from the München-Freiham station. In September 2013, the railroad crossing was closed and replaced in 2015 by a pedestrian and bicycle underpass.

== Structures ==
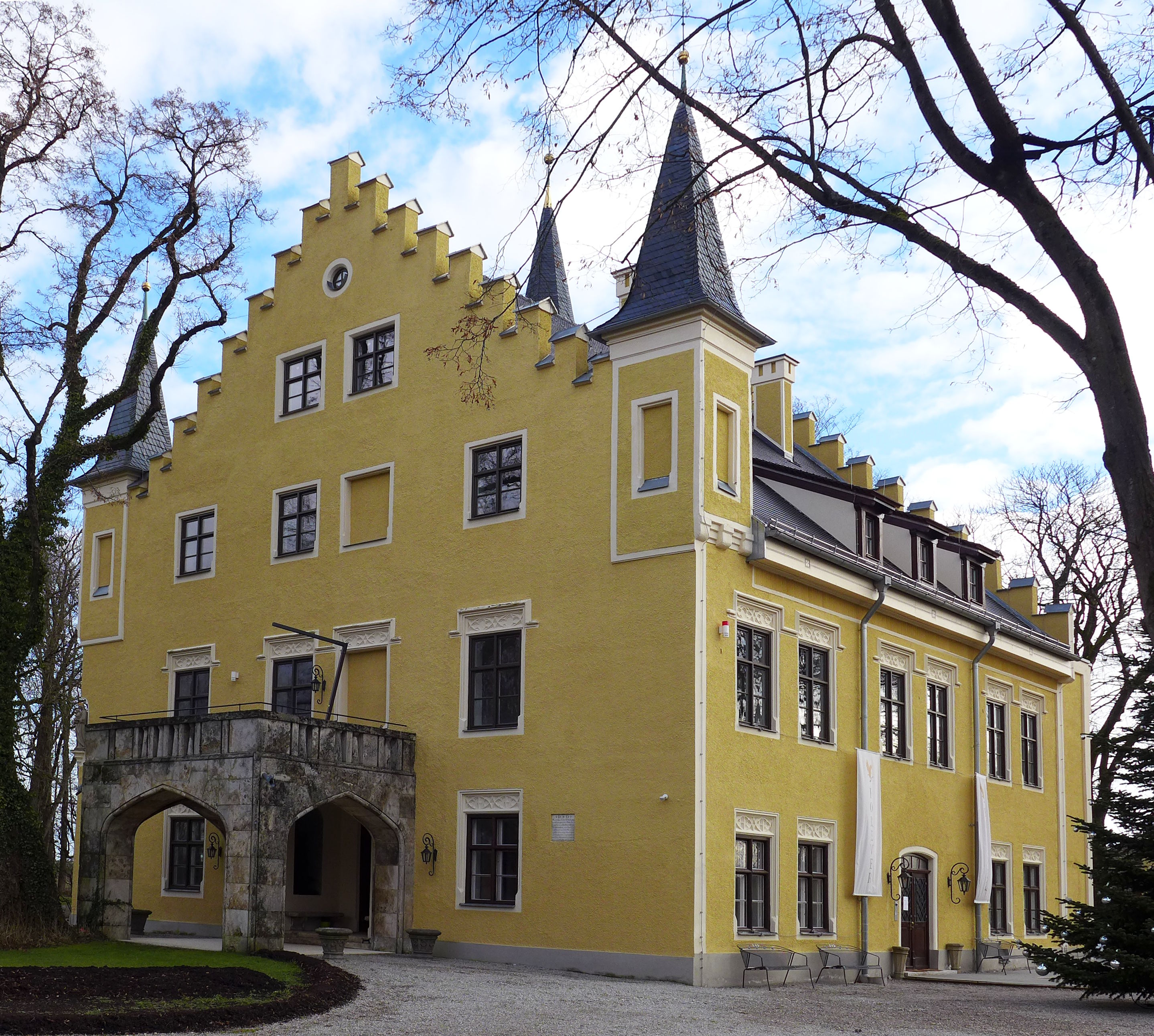
Schloss Freiham

- Freihamer Allee (no number): former barn I of the Freiham estate (19th century)
- Freihamer Allee 21/23: Schlosswirtschaft Freiham
- Freihamer Allee 22: former horse stable (18th century)
- Freihamer Allee 24: Catholic Church of the Holy Cross (built from the 15th century) within a cemetery (17th to 20th centuries)
- Freihamer Allee 31: Schloss Freiham with park, in the core of the 17th century, changed in 1865 to neo-Gothic
