= Munich S-Bahn =

Electric rail transit system in Germany

Coordinates: 48.1408°N 11.5550°E

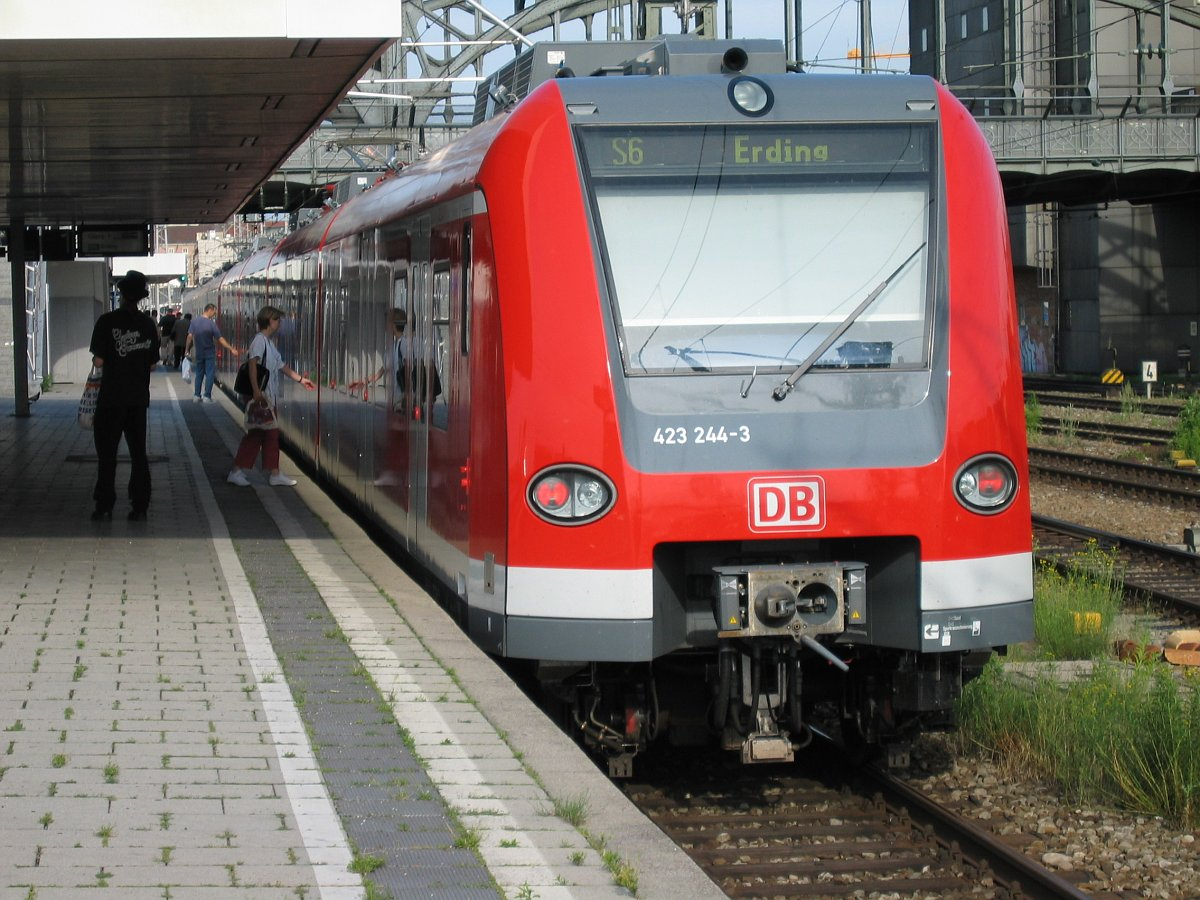
- S-Bahn train at Hackerbrücke (Br 423)

Overview
- Locale: Munich
- Transit type: Rapid transit, regional rail
- Number of lines: 8
- Number of stations: 150
- Daily ridership: 840,000
- Website: Official website

Operation
- Began operation: 28 May 1972
- Operator: S-Bahn München
- Number of vehicles: 238 BR423

Technical
- System length: 434 km (270 mi)
- Track gauge: 1,435 mm (4 ft 8 1/2 in) (standard gauge)
- Electrification: 15 kV, 16.7 Hz AC Overhead lines
System map

The Munich S-Bahn (German: S-Bahn München) is an electric rail transit system in Munich, Germany. "S-Bahn" is the German abbreviation for Stadtschnellbahn (literally, "urban rapid rail"), and the Munich S-Bahn exhibits characteristics of both rapid transit and commuter rail systems.

The Munich S-Bahn network is operated by S-Bahn München, a subsidiary of DB Regio Bayern, which is itself a subsidiary of the German national railway company, Deutsche Bahn. It is integrated into the Munich Transport and Tariff Association (Münchner Verkehrs- und Tarifverbund, MVV) and interconnected throughout the city with the locally owned Munich U-Bahn. Today, the S-Bahn covers most of the populated area of the Munich metropolitan area of about 3 million inhabitants. In terms of system length, the Munich S-Bahn is the fourth-largest in Germany, behind the Rhine-Neckar S-Bahn, Rhine-Ruhr S-Bahn and the S-Bahn Mitteldeutschland.

The Munich S-Bahn was established on 28 May 1972. It was intended as part of the scheme to provide an adequate transport system during the 1972 Summer Olympics held in Munich by connecting the pre-existing suburban rail services in the west and east of the city via a new tunnel section from Hauptbahnhof to Ostbahnhof.

== Lines ==
=== System ===
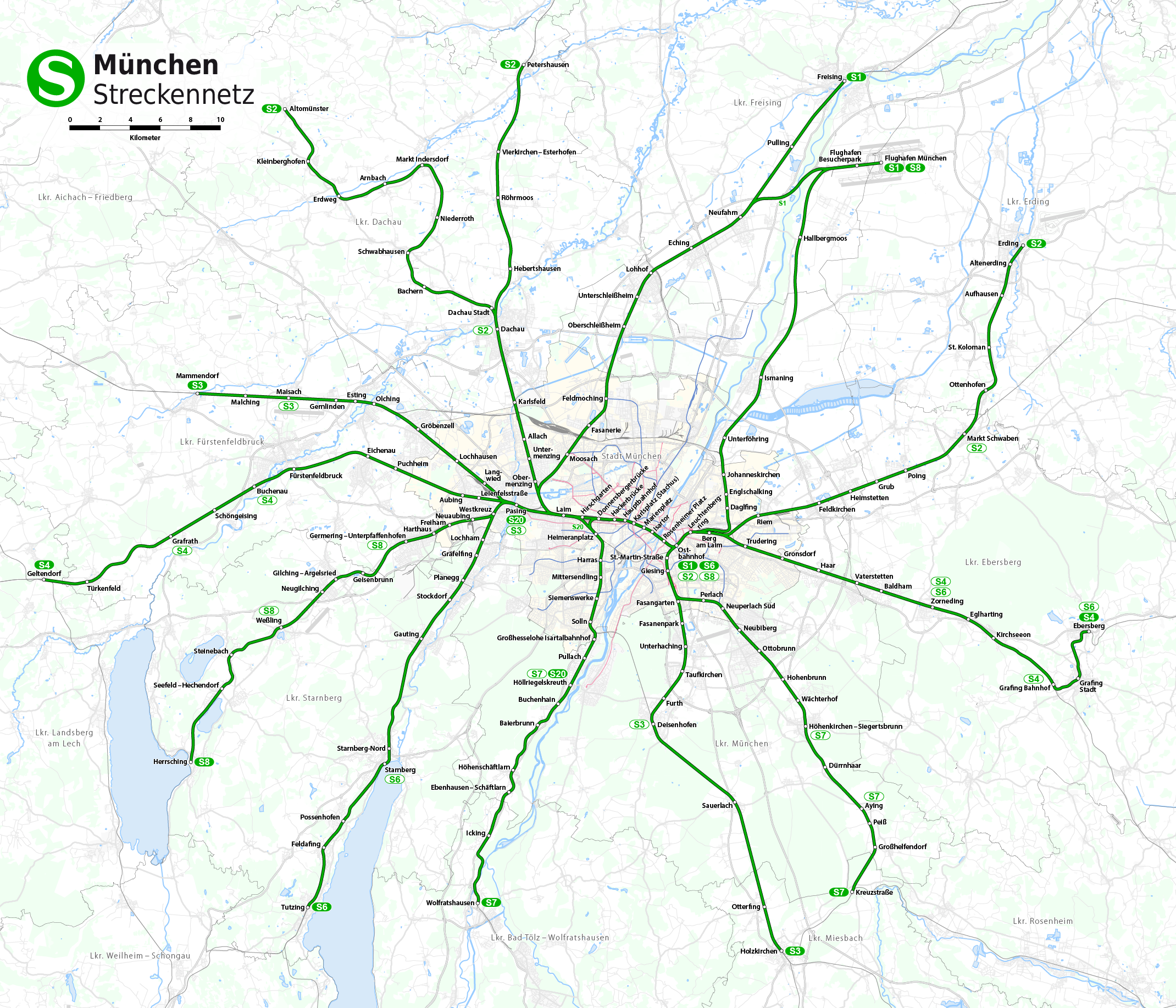
Network of the Munich S-Bahn since 2009

The system has seven branches in the west, which were originally numbered from north to south from the S 1 (to Freising) to the S 7 (Wolfratshausen). These are coupled with the five eastern branches. Operational requirements have changed several times, particularly due to line extensions, resulting in random numbering in the east. Two lines end at Munich East station (Ostbahnhof), these are currently S 1 and S 6. The first change was made in June 1991 when the branch to Ebersberg changed from S 4 to S 5 as a requirement to shorten the travel time to and from Herrsching. The line to Wolfratshausen was first called the S 10, but when it was connected to run over the trunk line it was changed to the S 7.

The S-Bahn branch in the east via Ismaning to the airport was designated as the S 8. Later this was combined with the original line S 3, which shared part of the route of the S 8, and the new route is called the S 8. This eliminated route S 3. The old route S 5 was later largely replaced by the current S 3, so there was no line S 5 until December 2024.

In addition, there is line S 20, which runs from Pasing to Höllriegelskreuth. These two lines do not run through the trunk line tunnel. The numbers beginning with 2 comes from the time of the introduction of these lines, as the line to Holzkirchen via Deisenhofen still had the number S 2 (instead of the current S 3). These lines cross the Isar via Großhesselohe Bridge.

In the Deutsche Bahn time table, the S-Bahn lines are numbered from 999.1 to 999.8 and 999.20; line A is numbered as 999.30.

=== Frequency ===
The basic interval of the Munich S-Bahn is one train every 20 minutes. On parts of some branches during peak hours there is a 10-minute frequency produced by added trains. A special case is the line to Erding, where on weekdays a mix of express trains from Erding and normal S-Bahn trains from Markt Schwaben runs in the morning peaks, producing a 10-minute frequency west of Munich East station. There are also occasional additional trains on the western section of the S4 and on the S1 between Freising and Munich during the peak hour, which do not continue past the Hauptbahnhof (not run through the trunk line tunnel). On some branches, one of three trains does not run to the terminus station at off-peak times, so that on these outer sections trains run at 20 or 40 minutes alternatively. The S8 is 24/7 (only in the airport direction). The S-Bahn operates daily from approximately 4:15 am to 1 am, but night trains only operate every 20 to 40 minutes. Weekend trains on Friday and Saturday nights, and before public holidays, operate all night long.

Line	Route	Frequency
S1 (Munich)	Freising – Pulling – Neufahrn	Every 20 or 40 minutes alternatively
S1 (Munich)	Munich Airport – Flughafen Besucherpark – Neufahrn – Eching – Lohhof – Unterschleißheim – Oberschleißheim – Feldmoching – Fasanerie – Moosach – Laim – Hirschgarten – Donnersbergerbrücke – Hackerbrücke – Hauptbahnhof – Karlsplatz (Stachus) – Marienplatz – Isartor – Rosenheimer Platz – Ostbahnhof	Every 20 minutes
S2 (Munich)	Petershausen – Vierkirchen-Esterhofen – Röhrmoos – Hebertshausen – Dachau	Every 20 or 40 minutes alternatively
S2 (Munich)	Altomünster – Kleinberghofen – Erdweg – Arnbach – Markt Indersdorf – Niederroth – Schwabhausen – Bachern – Dachau Stadt – Dachau	Every 60 minutes, every 30 minutes in the peak hour
S2 (Munich)	Dachau – Karlsfeld – Allach – Untermenzing – Obermenzing – Laim – Hirschgarten – Donnersbergerbrücke – Hackerbrücke – Hauptbahnhof – Karlsplatz (Stachus) – Marienplatz – Isartor – Ostbahnhof – Leuchtenbergring – Berg am Laim – Riem – Feldkirchen – Heimstetten – Grub – Poing – Markt Schwaben	Every 20 minutes
S2 (Munich)	Markt Schwaben – Ottenhofen – St. Kolomann – Aufhausen – Altenerding – Erding	Every 20 or 40 minutes alternatively
S3 (Munich)	Mammendorf – Malching – Maisach	Every 20 or 40 minutes alternatively
S3 (Munich)	Maisach – Gernlinden – Esting – Olching – Gröbenzell – Lochhausen – Langwied – Pasing – Laim – Hirschgarten – Donnersbergerbrücke – Hackerbrücke – Hauptbahnhof – Karlsplatz (Stachus) – Marienplatz – Isartor – Rosenheimer Platz – Ostbahnhof – St.-Martin-Straße – Giesing – Fasangarten – Fasanenpark – Unterhaching – Taufkirchen – Furth – Deisenhofen (*)	Every 20 minutes
S3 (Munich)	Deisenhofen – Sauerlach – Otterfing – Holzkirchen	Every 20 or 40 minutes alternatively
S4 (Munich)	Geltendorf – Türkenfeld – Grafrath (– Schöngeising – Buchenau)	Every 20 or 40 minutes alternatively
S4 (Munich)	(Grafrath – Schöngeising –) Buchenau – Fürstenfeldbruck – Eichenau – Puchheim – Aubing – Leienfelsstraße – Pasing – Laim – Hirschgarten – Donnersbergerbrücke – Hackerbrücke – Hauptbahnhof – Karlsplatz (Stachus) – Marienplatz – Isartor – Rosenheimer Platz – Ostbahnhof – Leuchtenbergring – Berg am Laim – Trudering	Every 20 minutes
S4 (Munich)	Trudering – Gronsdorf – Haar – Vaterstetten – Baldham – Zorneding – Eglharting – Kirchseeon – Grafing station	Every 20 minutes in the peak hours
S4 (Munich)	Grafing station – Grafing Stadt – Ebersberg	Every 20 or 40 minutes in the peak hours
S5 (Munich)	Pasing – Laim – Hirschgarten – Donnersbergerbrücke – Hackerbrücke – Hauptbahnhof – Karlsplatz (Stachus) – München Marienplatz station – Isartor – Rosenheimer Platz – Ostbahnhof – St.-Martin-Straße – Giesing – Perlach – Neuperlach Süd – Neubiberg – Ottobrunn – Hohenbrunn – Wächterhof – Höhenkirchen-Siegertsbrunn	Every 20 minutes
S5 (Munich)	Höhenkirchen-Siegertsbrunn – Dürrnhaar – Aying	Every 20 or 40 minutes alternatively
S5 (Munich)	Aying – Peiß – Großhelfendorf – Kreuzstraße	Hourly
S6 (Munich)	Tutzing – Feldafing – Possenhofen – Starnberg	Every 20 or 40 minutes alternatively
S6 (Munich)	Starnberg – Starnberg Nord – Gauting – Stockdorf – Planegg – Gräfelfing – Lochham – Westkreuz – Pasing – Laim – Hirschgarten – Donnersbergerbrücke – Hackerbrücke – Hauptbahnhof – Karlsplatz (Stachus) – Marienplatz – Isartor – Rosenheimer Platz – Ostbahnhof – Leuchtenbergring – Berg am Laim – Trudering – Gronsdorf – Haar – Vaterstetten – Baldham – Zorneding – Eglharting – Kirchseeon – Grafing Station	Every 20 minutes
S6 (Munich)	Grafing Station – Grafing Stadt – Ebersberg	Every 20 minutes in the peak hour and every 20 or 40 minutes during the day
S7 (Munich)	Wolfratshausen – Icking – Ebenhausen-Schäftlarn – Hohenschäftlarn – Baierbrunn – Buchenhain – Höllriegelskreuth	Every 20 or 40 minutes alternatively
S7 (Munich)	Höllriegelskreuth – Pullach – Großhesselohe Isartalbahnhof – Solln – Siemenswerke – Mittersendling – Harras – Heimeranplatz – Donnersbergerbrücke – Hauptbahnhof	Every 20 minutes
S8 (Munich)	Herrsching – Seefeld-Hechendorf – Steinebach – Weßling	Every 20 or 40 minutes alternatively
S8 (Munich)	Weßling – Neugilching – Gilching-Argelsried – Geisenbrunn – Germering-Unterpfaffenhofen – Harthaus – Freiham – Neuaubing – Westkreuz – Pasing – Laim – Hirschgarten – Donnersbergerbrücke – Hackerbrücke – Hauptbahnhof – Karlsplatz (Stachus) – Marienplatz – Isartor – Rosenheimer Platz – Ostbahnhof – Leuchtenbergring – Daglfing – Englschalking – Johanneskirchen – Unterföhring – Ismaning – Hallbergmoos – Flughafen Besucherpark – Munich Airport	Every 20 minutes
S20 (Munich)	Pasing – Heimeranplatz – Mittersendling – Siemenswerke – Solln – Großhesselohe Isartalbahnhof – Pullach – Höllriegelskreuth	Hourly (Mo-Fr)

(*) Terminus of extra services in peak. Up to here services in the peak run at 10-minute intervals.

(+) Occasional additional services to create 10 minute frequency.

=== Routes ===
The S-Bahn partly operates on its own routes (one or two tracks), parts of it are double-track lines where S-Bahn operations are mixed with other traffic (passengers and freight), and in some cases more than two tracks are available. In the latter case one-or two tracks are set aside for the S-Bahn operations only and the two other tracks are used for the remaining traffic.

In the following table, the route length is shown from Munich Hauptbahnhof or from Ostbahnhof (Munich East station) because it reflects the chainage officially applied to the lines. An exception is S27 where the chainage starts at Pasing.

Line	Route and section	Distance from Hbf or Ostbf	Other traffic	Infrastructure
to	Trunk line Pasing–Hbf–Ostbahnhof	11.4 km	Between Pasing and Hauptbahnhof some trains are operated between Donnersbergerbrücke and Hauptbahnhof by Bayerische Oberlandbahn	Three stations with three or more platform tracks, three stations using Spanish solution.
West	Munich–Regensburg railway Laim–Freising	40.7 km	Regional and Interregional (ALEX, DIX (Donau-Isar-Express)) services, as well as freight traffic.	Two tracks in mixed operation for 34.5 km.
West	Neufahrn Link; Neufahrn–Airport West (7.3 km)	40.8 km	S-Bahn only, except for occasional freight trains	Two tracks.
West	Munich–Ingolstadt line Laim–Petershausen	36.4 km	Intercity-Express services to Berlin and Hamburg as well as Frankfurt via Nuremberg, Regional services to Nuremberg and Ingolstadt and freight traffic.	Separate S-Bahn (one or two tracks) in addition to high-speed tracks for ICE and other traffic.
West	Dachau–Altomünster railway Dachau–Altomünster	47.7 km	S-Bahn only	Single track
West	Munich–Augsburg railway Pasing–Mammendorf	31.0 km	Regional, long-distance and freight traffic. This is one of the busiest lines in Germany, so it was upgraded to four tracks for the S-Bahn.	Separate tracks for the S-Bahn (two to Maisach, then one to Mammendorf).
West	Munich–Buchloe railway Pasing–Geltendorf	42.1 km	Various regional services every two hours, two hourly EuroCity service to Zürich, diverted long-distance services from Augsburg-Munich line	Two tracks mixed operations for 34.7 km. Electrified for the S-Bahn to Geltendorf.
West	Munich–Herrsching railway Pasing–Herrsching	38.3 km	Only S-Bahn services.	Two tracks to Weßling, then single track.
West	Munich–Garmisch-Partenkirchen railway Pasing–Tutzing	39.6 km	Regional services and occasional long-distance trains to Garmisch-Partenkirchen.	Two separate S-Bahn tracks to Gauting, then two tracks in mixed operation.
S7	Isar Valley Railway; Solln–Wolfratshausen	31.3 km	Only S-Bahn services.	Two tracks to Höllriegelskreuth, then single track.
East	Airport line Ostbahnhof–Ismaning–Airport	33.1 km	Freight traffic between Daglfing and North Ring.	Continuous two tracks, some in mixed operation with freight.
East	Munich–Mühldorf railway and Markt Schwaben–Erding railway Ostbahnhof–Markt Schwaben–Erding	34.7 km	Freight and regional traffic towards Mühldorf and Freilassing to Markt Schwaben, then only S-Bahn traffic.	Two tracks in mixed operation to Markt Schwaben, then single track to Erding.
East	Munich–Rosenheim railway and Grafing–Wasserburg railway Ostbahnhof–Grafing–Ebersberg	31.0 km	Regional services to Rosenheim and Wasserburg, long-distance services to Salzburg, as well as freight traffic.	Four tracks to Grafing (S-Bahn operations separated), then single track with mixed traffic.
S5	Munich East–Deisenhofen railway and Munich-Giesing–Kreuzstraße railway Giesing–Kreuzstraße	30.1 km	S-Bahn only.	Single track.
East	Munich East–Deisenhofen railway and Munich–Holzkirchen railway Ostbahnhof–Giesing–Deisenhofen–Holzkirchen	31.2 km	S-Bahn only to Deisenhofen. The Bayerische Oberlandbahn also operates between Deisenhofen and Holzkirchen.	Two tracks.
S20	Sendling Clasp; Pasing–Mittersendling–Höllriegelskreuth (8.8 km); Pasing–Mittersendling–Höllriegelskreuth	20.5 km	Runs in part over freight tracks to/from Munich Laim marshalling yard and between Mittersendling and Solln over the Bayerische Oberland Bahn.	Single track to Mittersendling, then continuing on double track in mixed operation.

=== Former Lines / Station Renamings ===
Here are some of the former train lines. Some of the stations are also renamed as well.

- /: Until the tunnel section on the Donnersbergerbrücke was opened on 31 May 1981, instead today's S7 and S10 to Hauptbahnhof (Holzkirchner wing station) without stopping at Donnersberger and Hackerbrücke. Instead of the later, Starnberg wing station to Munich Hauptbahnhof, the S27 and S22 also ended in Holzkirchner Bahnhof. were used, locomotive-hauled trains.
- From Pasing via Mittersendling to Deisenhofen was originally part of the push-pull operation under the name S12. Thereafter, these trains ran without S-Bahn-designation. Later, the line was simplified and became the S20 again an S-Bahn-designation.
- /: The S5 and S11 ran as special lines during the 1972 Olympic Games via Johanneskirchen (S5) or Moosach (S11) to the now-defunct Olympiastadion.
- , from 1985, went as a special line at major events in the Olympic Park until 1988, running from Moosach to Olympiastadion.
- : In 1975, the operation of the S-Bahn to Freiham was abandoned.
- : In 1981, the operation to Großhesselohe was abandoned.
- /: The commissioning of the S-Bahn station Heimeranplatz took place on 26 September 1982.
- : In 1992, Unterpfaffenhofen-Germering station was renamed as Germering-Unterpfaffenhofen
- /: Until the construction of the airport line, S8 (1991) made use of the S3 the route Nannhofen-Ismaning. After the construction of the route to the airport the S8 ended in the West in Pasing, the S3 went to the east to the Ostbahnhof. Later, the two lines were merged in order to relieve the original route in 1994. Because of the importance of the airport line, the line S3 ceased to operate and only S8 operated. There was no 'S3' from 1994 to 2004 and now there is no S5 for this reason.
- : From December 2004 to December 2005 witnessed the temporary re-introduction of the S3: it was a peak hour service between Maisach and Zorneding and realized the promised 10-minute frequency on this section. (Red / Black). After one year, this service became obsolete because the West branches of the S4 and S8 were exchanged.
- : On 28 May 2000, the terminus points, Esterhofen and Walpertshofen have been renamed to Vierkirchen-Esterhofen and Hebertshausen.
- : With the timetable change on 12 December 2004, Mühlthal station was closed, since then the trains of S6 have run the 7.7 km between Gauting and Starnberg Nord without intermediate stops.
- : With the timetable change in late 2005, the terminus of the line was S4 (previously: S8) at Nannhofen was renamed Mammendorf.
- : the timetable change in December 2009 accounted for the designation S5. The route to Herrsching has since been operated by the S8 route to Holzkirchen of the S3.
- : the timetable change in December 2009, the S3 was reintroduced. It now runs between Mammendorf and Holzkirchen.
- : The S27 operated from Starnberg wing station at the main station along the route of the S7 to Solln, crossed the Isar on the Großhesseloher bridge and ran on to Deisenhofen. On 15 December 2013, the S27 was abandoned and replaced by regional trains of the Meridian.
- : From 1995 to 2014, the line A was the only non-electrified Munich S-Bahn line, which ran on the Dachau–Altomünster railway. It was made into a branch of the S2 on 14 December 2014, and was finally electrified.

=== Intra-Urban Long-Distance Lines ===
The connection between the Hauptbahnhof and the Ostbahnhof, called the "Südring", runs west from Hauptbahnhof before turning south and curving toward Ostbahnhof without any stops in between. The trains travelling on this route (DB50) are included in the MVV tariff scheme and offer a view of the city while the travel time is slightly longer than the Stammstrecke tunnel.

Additional regional lines make calls at stations also served by the S-Bahn but provide an effective express functionality for MVV passengers. The examples include:

- Garmisch-Partenkirchen to Munich, calling at Tutzing (S6) and Pasing (Stammstrecke)
- Augsburg to Munich, calling at Mammendorf (irregularly) and Pasing (Stammstrecke)
- Regensburg to Munich, calling at Moosburg, and Freising (S1)
- Rosenheim to Munich, calling at Grafing Bf (S4) and Ostbahnhof (Stammstrecke)
- Various southern lines of the BRB, calling at Holzkirchen (S3) and several S7 stations (Solln (weekends), Siemenswerke (weekdays), Harras, Donnersbergerbrücke, Main Station)
- Former S27 route served by the BRB from Deisenhofen to Main Station via Solln and then along the S7, stops at all stations apart from Hackerbrücke
- Rosenheim to Holzkirchen calling at Kreuzstraße (S7) and Holzkirchen (S3), sometimes continuing to Munich
- Lindau to Munich, calling at Geltendorf (S4) and Pasing (Stammstrecke)
- Nürnberg to Munich, calling at Petershausen (S2) and Dachau Bf (S2)

Expansion plans announced by the MVV on 7 April 2017 include express S-Bahn lines with limited stops operating through the second tunnel now under construction.

== History ==
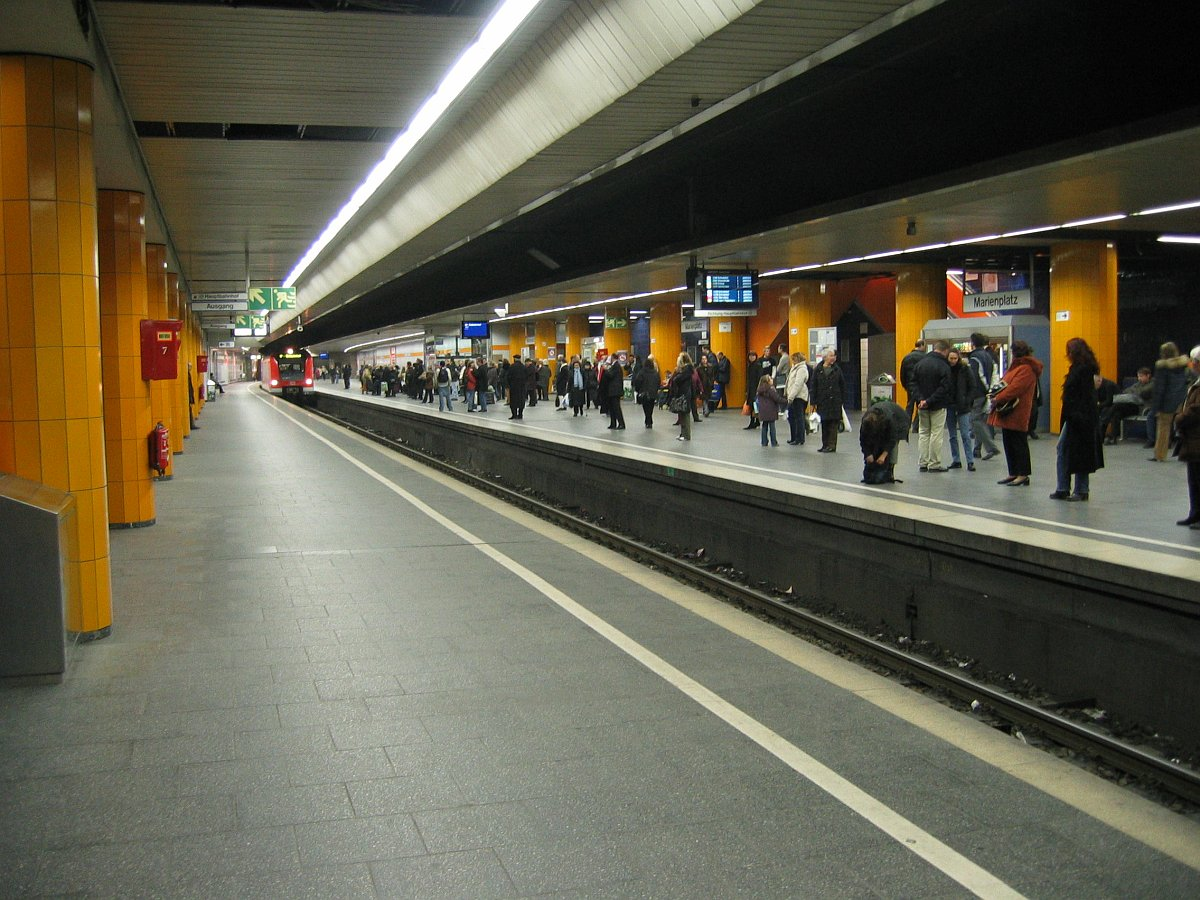
S-Bahn station Marienplatz with S7 to Munich East

An underground railway line for Munich was first proposed in 1928 in a report on the "relocation of traffic centres". An underground route would allow "direct long distance traffic to and through the city centre".

On 22 May 1938, the first tunnel, which was part of the north–south route, was started in the Lindwurmstraße, between the present-day underground stations Sendlinger Tor and Goetheplatz. In the speech of Julius Dorpmüller, the general director of Deutsche Reichsbahn, the project was called "S-Bahn" for the first time. Due to World War II the construction and plans for the Munich S-Bahn were set aside.

S-Bahn Plans in 1941
From	To	Tunnel
Schleißheim	Freising	Ringbahn
Dachau	–	Ost-West
Maisach	–	Ost-West
Aubing	Grafrath	Ost-West
Unterpfaffenhofen-Germering	Herrsching	Ost-West
Gauting	–	Ost-West; Ringbahn
Luise-Kiesselbach-Platz	Großhadern	Nord-Süd
Höllriegelskreuth	–	Nord-Süd
Deisenhofen	Bayrischzell	Nord-Süd; Ost-West
Neubiberg	Kreuzstraße	Ost-West
Haar	Grafing	Ost-West
Riem	Markt Schwaben	Ost-West
Daglfing	–	Ost-West
Freimann	–	Nord-Süd
Ismaning	–	Nord-Süd

=== Plans, with the Munich Olympic bid ===
In 1965, the Federal Republic of Germany, the Free State of Bavaria, the state capital of Munich and the Deutsche Bundesbahn signed a contract on the construction of the Munich S-Bahn. The further development was most influenced by a decision made in Rome on 26 April 1966: the International Olympic Committee chose Munich over Detroit, Madrid and Montreal as the location for the 1972 Summer Olympics, resulting in a tight schedule of only six years to complete the Munich S-Bahn network.

S-Bahn: Plan 1969 und Status 1972
Line	West	East Plan	East From 1972
	Freising	Ismaning	Kreuzstraße
	Petershausen	Erding	Deisenhofen
	Nannhofen (now Mammendorf)	Deisenhofen	Ismaning
	Geltendorf	Kreuzstraße	Ebersberg
	Herrsching	München Ostbahnhof	München Ostbahnhof
	Tutzing	Ebersberg	Erding
	Wolfratshausen	Hauptbahnhof (Holzkirchner Flügelbahnhof)	Hauptbahnhof (Holzkirchner Flügelbahnhof)
	Deisenhofen	–	Hauptbahnhof (Holzkirchner Flügelbahnhof)
	Deisenhofen	–	München-Pasing

Not only did the tunnel through the city centre have to be built, the full railway infrastructure had to be expanded. The network of suburban lines had to be changed over and modernized. A large number of stations had to be upgraded; platforms were extended to a length of 210 metres (690 ft) to allow for three-unit trains, and the platform height was raised to 76 centimetres (2 ft 6 in). However, the floor height of trains used then and now is at approximately 1 metre (3 ft 3 in), which makes boarding difficult for people with wheelchairs or prams. Tunnel stations and platforms updated recently where no freight trains run do feature a height of 96 centimetres (3 ft 2 in), however.

On 25 February 1971 the topping-out ceremony could be celebrated in the core route tunnel. In May the first S-Bahn train of the ET 420 series was put into service on the route between Pasing and Gauting. On 1 September 1971 a regular advance service was started on that route.

=== Opening ===
On 28 May 1972, the Munich S-Bahn network was finally put into service with 360 kilometres (220 mi) of tracks and 101 trains of the ET 420 series. Town names in the nearby Munich such as Dachau, Tutzing, Erding and Pasing came into the picture. It was the first time a S-Bahn network that size was put into service on a single date. The route S10 to Wolfratshausen (today S7) was operated with conventional push-pull trains from the southern wing of Munich Central Station. It was electrified later and connected to the core route after the construction of a 260-metre (850 ft) tunnel crossing the large number of mainline rail tracks leading to Munich Central Station.

Three months later the German President Gustav Heinemann opened the 1972 Summer Olympics. During the Games there were two additional S-Bahn lines servicing the now-defunct station Olympiastadion (Olympic Stadium). The new S-Bahn system stood the test and transported 3.18 million passengers in 7,138 runs to and from the sports sites in only 17 days. The first stage was limited by the Olympic Games in 1972. Because of the enormous time pressure, not all lines could be equipped for a 10 or 20 minute cycle.

The second stage was necessary mainly because of the increasing traffic volume. In 1973 and 1974, the Deutsche Bundesbahn established the following construction measures: Own S-Bahn tracks were to be built on the railway tracks from Lochhausen to Nannhofen (now Mammendorf) and from Munich to East Grafing, So as not to hinder long-distance and regional transport on the respective routes. As new settlements developed in Esting, in the south Neuperlachs and in Unterschleißheim new settlements, the new breakpoints Unterschleißheim in the year 1977, Neuperlach Süd in 1977 and Esting in 1980. In addition, The railway line to Herrsching was to be extended two-way between Freiham and Weßling.

Since then the Munich S-Bahn network has been expanded multiple times. On 28 May 1980, it was extended to Mammendorf. On 3 November 1979, it was extended to Ebersberg (S4). S5 was extended to Herrsching in 1984.

In 1992, the route between Ismaning and the newly opened Airport Munich II was put into service as S8, followed by S1 extension on 29 November 1998.

=== Further development ===
With the timetable change on 12 December 2004, the ten-minute headway on the S 4 from Maisach to Zorneding and on the S 5 from Germering-Unterpfaffenhofen to Deisenhofen was introduced during rush hour, doubling the number of trains offered from three to six per hour. Since 11 December 2005 this is also offered on the western section of the S 2 to Dachau. This means there are now 30 trains per hour and direction on the trunk line during rush hour.

In August 1998, the federal government, the Free State of Bavaria and Deutsche Bahn decided on a 266-million-euro package to introduce this ten-minute headway on several lines. The main point was the modernization of the control and safety technology between Pasing and Ostbahnhof, including the installation of Linienzugbeeinflussung. Between 2001 and 2005, construction work on the external lines continued as part of this program. In addition, new S-Bahn stations were opened on 10 June 2001 in Starnberg Nord (S6 West) and on 11 December 2005 in Untermenzing (S2 West). Some already existing stations on the outer routes could also be made wheelchair-accessible in the financial framework of the project. On 21 November 2005, the section of the airport line S 8 within Unterföhring was moved underground, this was at the request of the town. On 13 December 2009, a new stop "Hirschgarten" was inaugurated on the S-Bahn trunk line between Laim and Donnersbergerbrücke. On 14 September 2013 a new Freiham stop was opened on line S8 close to the one that had been closed decades before, which is to connect the new residential area Freiham. It is located one kilometer east of the 1975 decommissioned station Freiham. Construction had begun on 12 June 2012.

On 15 December 2013, the S 27 from the main station to Deisenhofen was discontinued, the trips are taken by the half-hourly Meridian trains of the Bayerische Regiobahn, which are extended in the rush hour via Holzkirchen and the Mangfalltalbahn to Rosenheim. In addition, the terminus of the S 20 line was relocated from Deisenhofen to Höllriegelskreuth on the Isartalbahn. The railway line Munich-Holzkirchen is no longer served by S-Bahn trains between Solln and Deisenhofen.

In 2014, the Dachau–Altomünster railway line, which had previously been used by line A, was electrified, which had been the only unelectrified stretch of the S-Bahn. Furthermore, a two-track meeting section between Bachern and Schwabhausen and an additional crossing station in Erdweg were built. The planning approval process was completed in January 2013. From 28 April to 13 December 2014, the line A line between Dachau and Altomünster was suspended for electrification, and Class 428 railcars were replaced by buses. After completion of the conversion work, electrical operation began on 14 December 2014. During rush hour, trains now operate on a 30-minute headway. Otherwise, service remains hourly. The route is operated as a wing section of the S 2. The last cost estimate was 47 million euros. Construction was originally scheduled to start in 2012 and completion was scheduled for 2013.

Further dates:

- 15 June 1966 – Construction of the core route tunnel begins in Arnulfstraße.
- 28 April 1972 – first test runs on the tunnel route (Hauptbahnhof-Marienplatz-Ostbahnhof).
- 28 May 1972 – regular service with 360 route km begins.

== Rolling stock ==
=== Current rolling stock ===
==== Class 420 ====
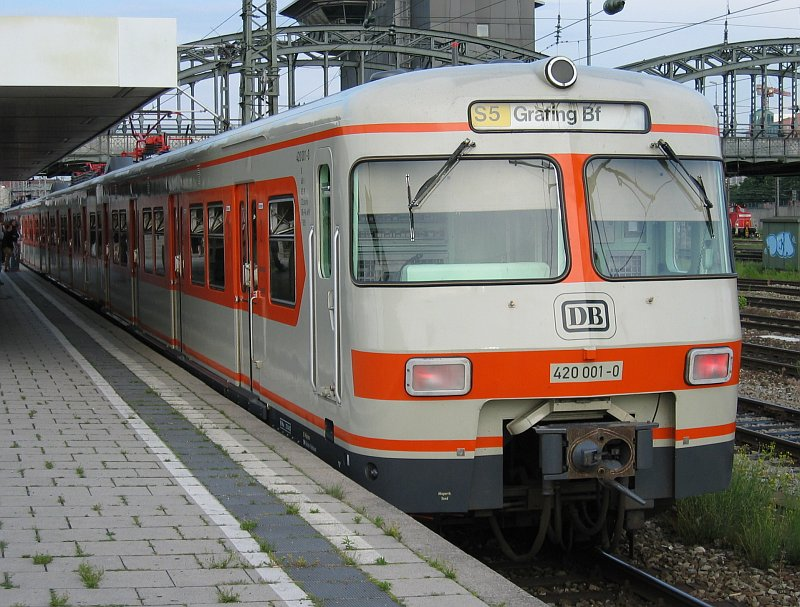
ET 420

Since the opening of the S-Bahn network from 1972 to 2004, vehicles of the DB Class 420 have been used in the Munich S-Bahn network. In 1972, however, only 101 of the ordered 120 trains were available, so that on some routes until 1975 had to be driven with turning trains. The first 120 vehicles came from the first series of this series. In the following years, due to the higher demand for vehicles, about 30 vehicles of the second construction series came to Munich. The number of trains of the second series of construction varied, as they were also exchanged with vehicles from other cities. From 1979 to 1982 also came vehicles of the fifth and sixth series to Munich, these were used after 1982 but again in other suburban rail networks. From 1992, some vehicles of the seventh and from 1996 the eighth series were added, so that the vehicle stock in Munich in 1996 included 209 vehicles. Since the delivery of Class 423 vehicles, the Class 420 trains have been delivered to other cities, sold or scrapped. For the time being, the last regular passenger service in the Munich S-Bahn network drove a train of this series, the so-called "Olympia motor coach", on 5 December 2004 on an amplifier circulation line S 8 and was since then only in the museum service at regular special trips to be found.

Due to the electrification of the A line and the resulting vehicle shortage since December 2014 again series 420 trainsets are used. These are 15 units taken over from the S-Bahn Stuttgart, but due to the lack of regular train traffic, they can not run on the main line during rush hours. They therefore take over exclusively the amplifier services on the S 2 between Dachau and Altomünster as well as amplifier rides on the west branch of the S 4 line and the S 20 line. Currently planning the S-Bahn Munich and the Bavarian railway company, 20 to 30 other units from Stuttgart to Munich to match the rising numbers of passengers. These are to be equipped with the existing units with the Linienzugbeeinflussung in order to be able to drive in the trunk tunnel.

Since the route of the line A from Dachau to Altomünster was not electrified until April 2014, DB Class 628 was primarily used. These were located in the railway depot of the Südostbayernbahn in Mühldorf am Inn. The vehicles were procured again in 1998 for the track, previously were used on the line A n-car push-pull trains with diesel locomotives. However, the entrances to the trains were not barrier-free because of steps. Following the electrification of the line, it was replaced by a branch line of S2, and Class 420s were replaced as well in June 2017.

==== Class 423 ====
From the autumn of 2000, the class 420 trainsets, some of them over thirty years old, were replaced massively by new vehicles of the class 423. The new vehicle emissions were enforced line by line, as the trains could not be coupled with each other. First, the S 7 line was served by the new locomotives. By 2003, 211 locomotives were delivered. In 2004, another 23 units were procured. In 2005, four more trains were delivered, so today there are 238 traction vehicles.

==== Class 424 ====
After the continuous of trains kept going, the company announced that some trains of the class 424 were to be transferred from Hanover to Munich and put them into S-Bahn service after a modernisation.

These trains would run services on the S20, with some services extending up to Geltendorf.

In December 2023, the first refurbished 424 units were placed into service on the S2 shuttle service between Dachau Bahnhof and Altomünster, and later entered service on the S20 as well. Due to the height of the train floor being 20 centimeters lower than the height of the platform, these trains are limited to the S2 Altomünster shuttle, the S20, and S4 amplifier services between Geltendorf and Munich Hauptbahnhof (platforms 27–36).

=== Future trains ===
==== Class 1420 ====
Class 1420
- Stock type: Electric multiple unit
- Manufacturer: Siemens Mobility
- Designer: Benno Schiefer (head form)
- Entered service: 2028 (planned)
- Number under construction: 90
- Formation: 13 cars
- Capacity: 1841 (480 seats)

Specifications
- Train length: 202 metres (663 ft)
- Width: c. 3 metres (9.8 ft)
- Doors: 62 (31 on each side)
- Maximum speed: 160 kilometres per hour (99 mph)
- Weight: 365 tonnes (359 long tons; 402 short tons)
- Power output: 7.8 MW
- Electric system: 15 kV 16.7 Hz AC overhead line
- Current collection: Pantograph
- Track gauge: 1,435 mm (4 ft 8 1/2 in) standard gauge

In October 2020, DB Regio started a competition for over 110 to 200 new trains for the S-Bahn München. These trains should be roughly 200m long.

It was planned to take the trains into service from 2026 onwards, however, according to various media sources, the new trains would be taken in service near the end of the 2020s. The first design concepts of the train were revealed on 14 February 2023 by the Bavarian ministry of traffic.

On 2 August 2023, it was revealed that Deutsche Bahn had awarded Siemens Mobility a contract worth more than €2 billion, for 90 13-car new S-Bahn trains, with options for further trains. With a capacity of 1841 passengers, lighting on the train will change according to the time of day, and seating will be organised in 3 and 4 seat configurations. A more powerful HVAC system, new passenger information displays showing occupancy, station stops and nearest exits on the platform, and free Wi-Fi will be fitted. External LED strips will display the colour of the S-Bahn line. 5 cars will have 'multi-purpose' areas with space for luggage, bicycles and strollers. The trains are fitted with ETCS, ATO and a train integrity monitoring system. The trains will enter service by the end of 2028.

The European Investment Bank and HypoVereinsbank, a subsidiary of UniCredit, provided credit of more than €2 billion for the order, with LHI Leasing selected as the lessor.

=== Others ===
==== Class 425 ====
In October 2019, some modernised trains of the Class 425 were brought to Munich to supplement a few services of the S20. This was to alleviate the chequered availability of rolling stock. After the timetable change in December 2019, those Class 425 train sets were returned to S-Bahn Rhein-Main.

==== n-Wagen ====
In 1972, during the Olympic Games, a consist made up of 15 Silberlinge cars and a DB Class 140 locomotive at the middle was used to haul trains on the S25 between the Ostbahnhof and the Olympiastadion stations.

==== Tests with double decker-trains ====
In 1989, the Dubbeldeksmaterieel (DDM-1) double decker carriages used by Nederlandse Spoorwegen in the Netherlands were briefly trialled on the then S4 between Geltendorf and Ebersberg. Patrons were invited to fill out a questionnaire while on board describing their experiences while boarding and riding the train. The concept was to increase passenger capacity at the same time as accommodating bicycles, prams, and wheelchairs with efficiency. The trains were pulled by a DB Class 120 locomotive at each end of the train.

== Plans and further expansions ==
=== The Second S-Bahn Tunnel (Zweite Stammstrecke) ===
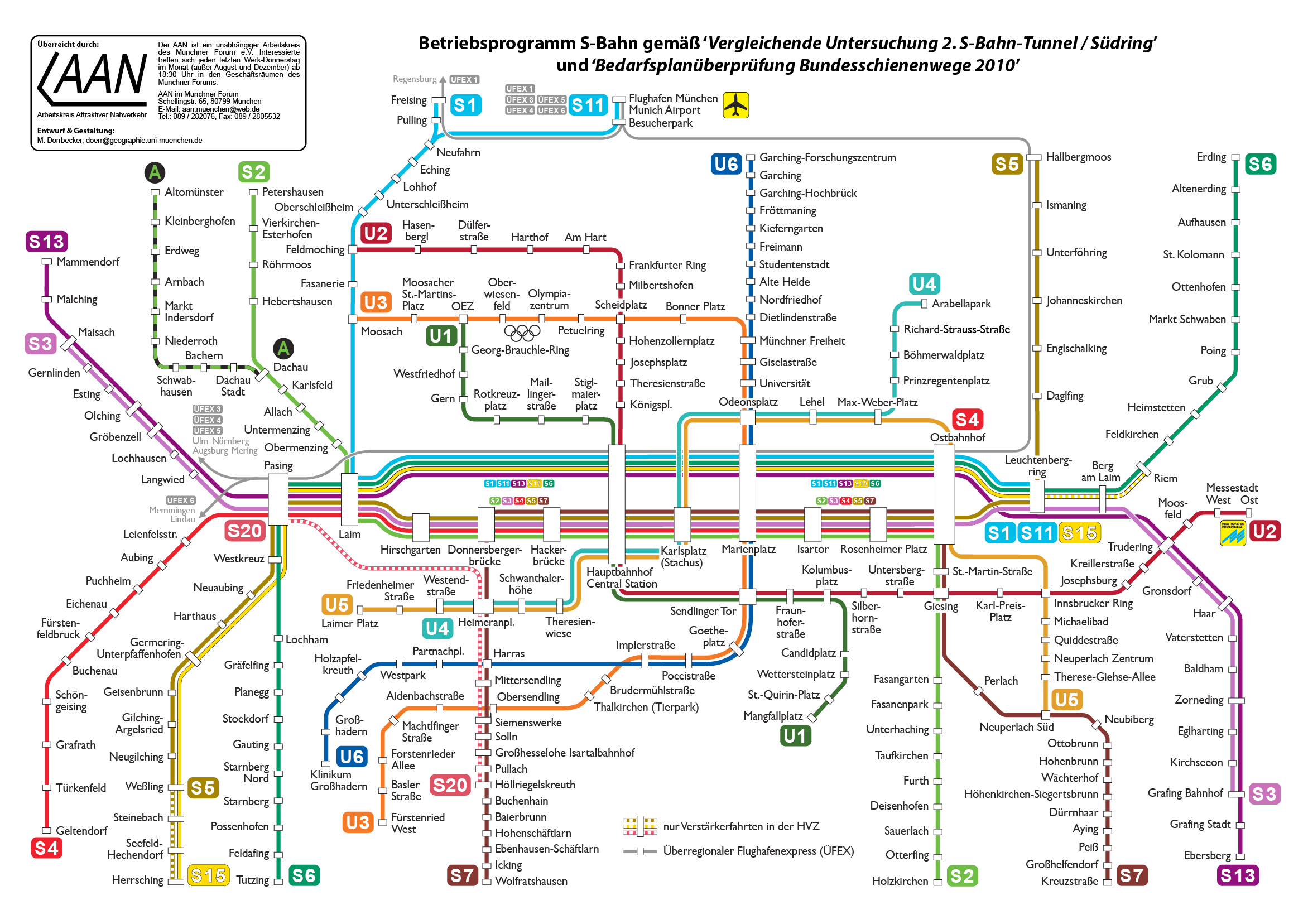
The proposed second tunnel map

Nearly all lines use the core route through the city centre in the underground, creating a bottle-neck responsible for long and increasingly frequent delays from even the smallest disruptions. The disadvantage of the current core route is the inability of trains to reroute themselves onto different tracks in the event of a disruption.

After years of discussions and studies into different route propositions, a second tunnel through the city centre has been already approved with the funding of €3.85 billion and the completion date of 2028–2032. On 5 April 2017, the ground-breaking ceremony took place to commence the construction.

The second tunnel will be 11.9 kilometres (7 miles) in length and run in parallel with the current tunnel in the south on the western portion of Hauptbahnhof and in the north on the eastern portion. It will have three underground stations (Hauptbahnhof, Marienhof, Ostbahnhof) and two surface stations (Laim and Leuchtenbergring). Marienhof, which will be built to the north of Munich Marienplatz station, will be the only all-new station on the line; other stations will be expanded to accommodate the new tunnel. With focus on express service and shorter travel time, the second tunnel will bypass six current stations between Laim and Ostbahnhof.

Most express S-Bahn trains with limited stops will use the second tunnel: the proposed express S-Bahn routes are S18X (Herrsching-Leuchtenbergring), S21X (Landshut-Leuchtenbergring), S23X (Mering-Flughafen München), and S24X (Buchloe-Leuchtenbergring). Two current S-Bahn routes will be transferred to the second tunnel upon the completion: S1 (Flughafen München/Freising-Ebersberg) and S6 (Tutzing-Leuchtenbergring).

==== Optimisation (Optimierung) ====
The initial design called for a second S-Bahn station underneath Orleansplatz at Ostbahnhof with long pedestrian tunnels connecting to the aboveground station serving regional and long-distance trains and current S-Bahn. This design received much negative criticism from the public, especially the residents in Haidhausen neighbourhood quarter. The residents have grave concern about tunnelling and earth extraction impacting their housing and disrupting their daily lives. The new EU directives call for more escape tunnels and rescue access points to be incorporated in the design. The forthcoming construction of new U9 subway station at the Hauptbahnhof requires the further tweaking of master build plans (reconstruction of main building and second S-Bahn station).

On 3 July 2019, Deutsche Bahn announced the new "2. Stammstrecke — Die Optimierungen" (Second Trunk Line Optimisation). The optimisation project called for second S-Bahn station at Ostbahnhof to be moved from Orleansplatz to the southeastern side of Ostbahnhof platforms along the street, Friedenstraße. The entire second S-Bahn station will be underground and connected to the current S-Bahn platforms via staircases, escalators, and lifts. The advantages of new location are its close proximity to the entertainment quarter in the southeast, higher capacity flow with more direct access to the aboveground platforms, better connection to Berg am Laim S-Bahn station, and platforms closer to the ground (16 metres deep instead of 40). The relocation necessitated realignment and lengthening of S-Bahn tunnels between Marienhof and Ostbahnhof.

The new EU directive requires the third tunnel for escape and rescue to be constructed between two tunnels and access points to the aboveground be added at every 600 metres. The benefit of new design allows quicker passenger evacuation from the tunnels, easier access for the rescue personnel, and simpler access for maintenance crew.

The State of Bavaria and Munich city council wants the first U9 station to be built at the Hauptbahnhof at the same time as reconstruction of Hauptbahnhof main building and construction of second S-Bahn trunk line. The new changes relocate U9 platforms from the west end of regional and long distance platforms to the middle of main Hauptbahnhof building below the ground. The relocation places U9 station directly above the second trunk line station in a cross arrangement. This improves the passenger flow between two current U-Bahn lines (U4/U5 and U1/U2/U7/U8), one current S-Bahn trunk line, and aboveground level.

=== S-Bahn-Nordring ===
An alternative route in the north has been proposed for many years. This route would use part of Münchner Nordring (Munich North Ring) currently used by the freight trains and as railway bypass. The plan would call for eight new S-Bahn stations and two conjunctions (one at Pasing and other one at Berg am Laim) to be built, totalling fourteen stations (six have been built earlier for use in the existing system: Pasing, Moosach, Johanneskirchen, Englschalking, Daglfing, and Trudering).

The advantage of using the Nordring is numerous as compared to Südring (South Ring – proposed as an assumedly weak alternative to second trunk line):

- Many rail infrastructures have been already built in the past, connecting to two current S-Bahn routes (S1 at Moosach and S8 between Johanneskirchen and Unterföhring);
- This will serve many of industrial centres in the north, namely BMW manufacturing plants, FIZ research centre, and media centres in Unterföhring;
- S-Bahn serving Nordring can also travel to the Munich Airport via Johanneskirchen station and back without transferring;
- Five stations would have U-Bahn connections while additional two would probably be connected if U1 (Lassallestraße) and U4 (Englschalking) extensions are built;
- Three stations would have tram connections (Pasing, Moosach, and Unterföhring Süd);
- The new S-Bahn stations and additional technical modifications can be built on the existing route without incurring the enormous cost as the second trunk route would.

The discussion of S-Bahn-Nordring is ongoing with no tentative date of construction and completion as well as cost estimate.

=== Circular Railway (Ringbahn) ===
Michael Piazolo, a Bavarian state parliament representative, commissioned a study for a potential Münchner Ringbahn. The proposal of building the circular railway similar to Berlin Ringbahn has recently gained more traction with the city government and the state parliament. The circular railway would use the Munich North Ring, the S8 line between Johanneskirchen and Ostbahnhof, the Südring between Ostbahnhof and Heimeranplatz, and a new line to be built between Heimeranplatz and Olympiakreuz. The close proximity of Nymphenburg Palace and the west–east lines at Donnersbergerbrücke station would require the construction of tunnels between south of Heimeranplatz and Olympiakreuz.

Most of the Ringbahn would use the existing railway lines with seven S-Bahn stations (Heimeranplatz, Donnersbergerbrücke, Johanneskirchen, Englschalking, Daglfing, Leuchtenbergring, and Ostbahnhof) currently in use. Five new surface stations (BMW Forschungszentrum, Ingolstädter Straße, Aumeister, Kolumbusplatz, and Poccisstraße) and three new underground stations (Nymphenburg, Neuhausen, and Olympiakreuz) would have to be built.

One additional advantage of this Ringbahn concept is an airport express train service from Hauptbahnhof via Olympiakreuz, following the proposed tracking for the finally abandoned Munich Airport Transrapid. That could potentially shorten the travel time from the Hauptbahnhof on the west side, bypassing the current S2 with numerous stops along the line.

=== Southern Ring ===
The alternative to the Circular Ring is the Southern Ring between Ostbahnhof and Heimeranplatz, with stations at Heimeranplatz, Poccistraße and Kolumbusplatz, which is the express variant.

=== Northern Tunnels along the Airport ===
In 2009, a Nordtunnel was proposed by Vieregg-Rössler as a further extension, which connects the main railway station with the Kunstareal (with the three Pinakotheken) Nordring, football stadium, Garching, airport). In the inner city area, the planned route is roughly equal to that of the planned U9. In addition to the S-Bahn, the route would also include regional and long-distance transport, in this way the central orientation of the Munich local transport system should be replaced by the city center. The Nordtunnel was not followed, among other things due to higher costs with at the same time lower profitability.

=== S-Bahn Vision 2050 ===
On 31 March 2017, MVV announced the Vision 2050 expansion proposal. The vision for the year 2050 includes double-decked wagons, 24-hour operations, new stations, and extensions further beyond the city limit.

The possible extensions are:

- S1 North from Freising to Landshut
- S2 North from Altomünster to Aichach and from Petershausen to Pfaffenhofen
- S2 East from Markt Schwaben to Dorfen
- S3 West from Mammendorf to Augsburg
- S3 South from Holzkirchen to Schaftlach which splits to Lenggries and Tegernsee
- S4/S6 East from Ebersberg to Wasserburg and from Grafing Bahnhof to Rosenheim
- S4/S6 West from Geltendorf to Kaufering and beyond
- S7 South to Geretsried (Geretsried Süd railway station) via Gelting and Geretsried Mitte. The environmental impact study is planned for 2017. Work started in 2022, and the projected completion date is 2027 at the earliest.
- New S-Bahn line from Karlsfeld to Dasing

Rings and Spurs (Ringschlüsse und Spange):

- Neufahrner Kurve (Neufahrn Curve): this will facilitate the travel between Freising and Munich Airport without switching back at Neufahrn. The construction was completed, and the RE train service to Regensburg and Landshut was commenced on 9 December 2018.
- Erdinger Ringschluss (Erding Loop): this line will connect with S1 and S8 at Munich Airport and with S2 at Erding. If completed, it would make two loops with one larger and one smaller, stopping at Hauptbahnhof and Munich Airport. Due to the military base nearby, the tunnel is required. Still in discussion.
- Walpertskirchner Spange (Walpertskirchner Spur): this line extend the Erdinger Ringschluß from Erding to proposed S2 East extension, connecting somewhere between Walpertskirchner and Thann-Matzbach. Still in discussion.
- Verknüpfungskurve S7 - Rosenheim: Like Neufahrner Kurve, this spur makes travelling between the city centre in Munich and Rosenheim easier without switchback at Kreuzstraße.

Four-Track Expansions:

- Four-track extension of S8 line to the Munich Airport and moving the surface railway to the underground between Leuchtenbergring and Unterföhring. The extra tracks are for freight trains, which must pull aside often for S-Bahn. If the four-track extension is completed, the airport express train could use the freight tracks as to bypass the local service. Still in discussion.
- Four-track extension of S4-West between Buchenau and Pasing. The extension is due to the opening of Gotthard Tunnel in Switzerland. This will increase freight transports between northern and southern Europe going through central Europe. The first phase is from Pasing to Puchheim. For cost reasons, the extension would terminate at Eichenau for time being. In planning.

Other Projects:

- Possible relocation of the S2 East to the Munich International Trade Fair site. Now cancelled.
- New stations at Breitenau, Emmering, Weichselbaum, Menterschwaige, Schwaigerloh, Sendlinger Spange, Gelting, and Messestadt Nord.

== Literature ==
- Pospischil, Reinhard; Rudolph, Ernst (1997). S-Bahn München (in German). Düsseldorf: Alba. ISBN 978-3-87094-358-5. OCLC 42476820.
- Franzke, Armin. "Im Tunnel unter City und Isar. 1972: Die S-Bahn München nimmt den Betrieb auf" [In a tunnel under the city and Isar. 1972: the S-Bahn Munich enters service]. Lok Magazin. 41/2002 (251). München: GeraNova Zeitschriftenverlag: 90–97. ISSN 0458-1822. OCLC 3136408.
- Korhammer, Klaus-Dieter; Franzke, Armin; Rudolph, Ernst (1991). Drehscheibe des Südens: Eisenbahnknoten München [Southern hub: railway nodes in Munich] (in German). Darmstadt: Hestra Verlag. ISBN 3-7771-0236-9.
- Wilhelm-Stempin, Nikolaus (2009). S-Bahnhöfe in und um München [S-Bahn stations in and around Munich] (in German). Norderstedt: BoD. ISBN 978-3-8391-0927-4.

== See also ==
- Munich U-Bahn
- List of rapid transit systems
- Rail transport in Germany
