= DBAG Class 424 =

Electric railcar of DB Regio

DBAG Class 424/434
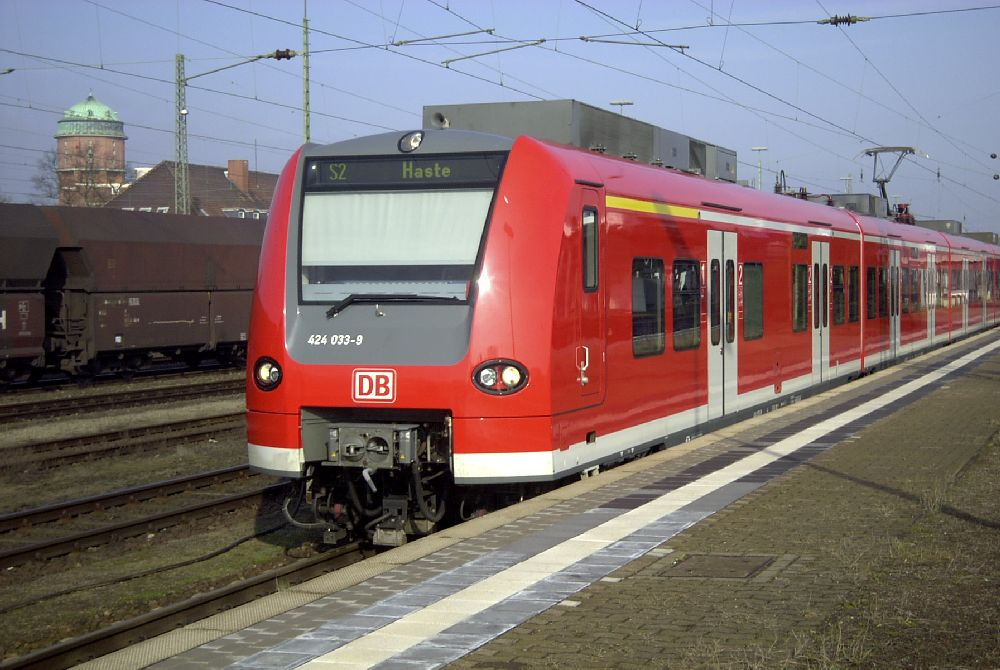
- Manufacturers: Adtranz/Bombardier, Siemens
- Constructed: 1999–2000
- Number built: 40

Specifications
- Train length: 67.5 m (221 ft 5 in)
- Floor height: 798 mm (31.4 in)
- Wheel diameter: 850 mm (33 in)
- Maximum speed: 140 km/h (87 mph)
- Weight: 114 t (112 long tons; 126 short tons)
- Traction system: Siemens E1100 D2000/525 M6 rq-1 GTO-VVVF
- Traction motors: 8 x 1TB1724 0GA02
- Power output: 2,350 kW
- Electric system: 15 kV 16.7 Hz AC
- Current collection: Pantograph
- UIC classification: Bo′(Bo′)(2′)(Bo′)Bo′
- Track gauge: 1,435 mm (4 ft 8 1/2 in)

The Class 424 is a class of electric multiple units formerly used on the Hanover S-Bahn network. 16 units were reallocated for the Munich S-Bahn and 24 units for the Cologne S-Bahn. The trains were ordered for the new Hanover S-Bahn, which would serve Expo 2000 in Hanover.

== Description ==
The Class 424 are similar to Deutsche Bahn's Class 425 and Class 423 trainsets.

A Class 424 unit consists of four cars that share three jacobs bogies and can only be separated at maintenance facilities. The inner two cars are designated as Class 434. A 424 unit typically consists of the following cars, where x is the unit's number:

- 424 x
- 434 x
- 434 (x+500)
- 424 (x+500)

e.g. 424 037 + 434 037 + 434 537 + 424 537. Differences usually occur when the remains of partially destroyed units are combined to form one intact EMU.

They have no visual distinctions to the Class 425. However, the Class 424 has a lower maximum speed of 140 km/h compared to the 160 km/h of the Class 425. Aside from that, installed on the Class 424 trains have variable steps and extendable platforms to reduce the gap between train and platform, which isn't fitted to earlier Class 425 units.

In comparison to the Class 423, the Class 424 feature a comparatively low floor height of 78 cm (31 in) to allow step-free access on 76 cm (29.9 in) platforms. They also lack a third set of doorways in the center of each car.

== Operational history ==
=== S-Bahn Hannover ===
The Class 424 vehicles were ordered for the new Hanover S-Bahn, which would serve Expo 2000 in Hanover. They were supposed to enter operation in 2000, which was then delayed due to technical issues. The transformers under the car body were not adequately protected and resulted in functional problems to the network signal and protection system. During the Expo 2000, borrowed Class 423 units from the Munich S-Bahn and Stuttgart S-Bahn were operated instead.

During large events such as the Hannover Messe, the fleet was often supported by Class 425 units from other regions. Eventually, the fleet was reinforced with Class 425, with 15 units for operation in the S5 to Paderborn. In 2008, the fleet was then completed with 13 Class 425 units of the 5th batch.

On June 12th 2022, the operation of the Class 424 in Hanover ended, as operations of the Hanover S-Bahn net was handed over to SBH - S-Bahn Hannover.

==== Naming ====
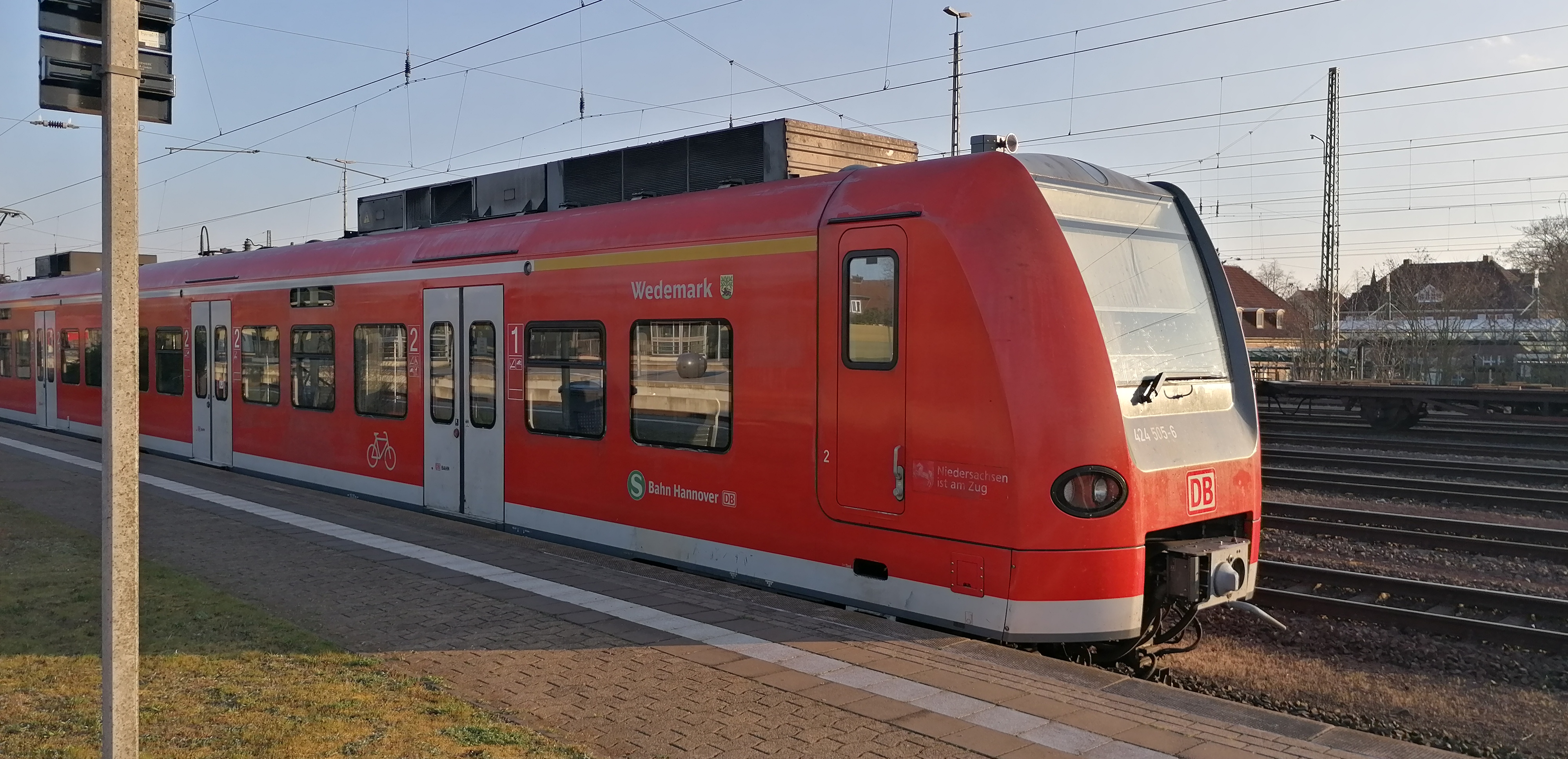
424 005, nicknamed Wedemark

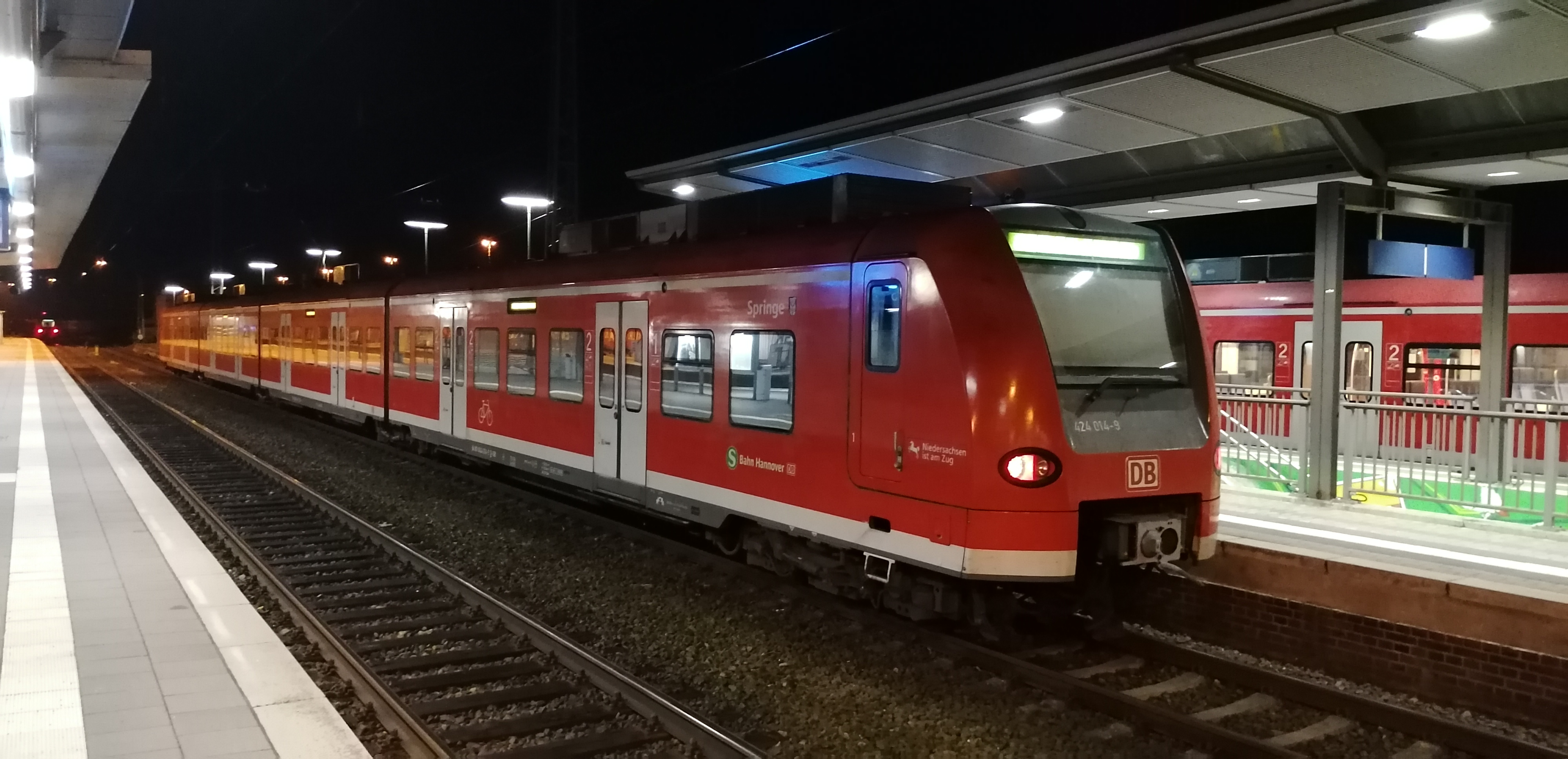
424 014, nicknamed Springe

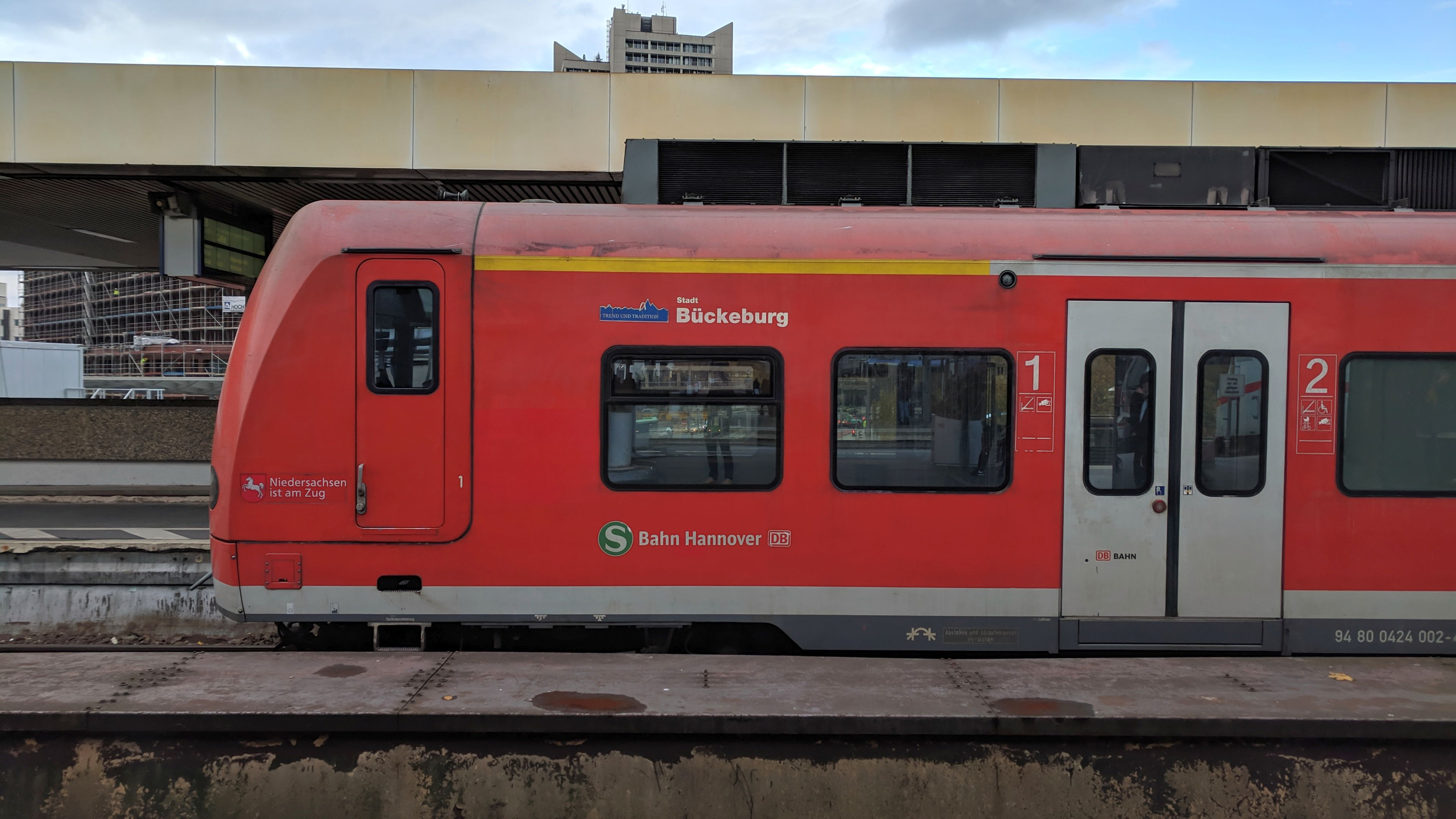
424 002, nicknamed Bückburg

During their operation in Hanover, some of the units carry names of towns and cities on the Hanover S-Bahn network:

- 424 001 Burgdorf
- 424 002 Bückeburg
- 424 004 Lehrte
- 424 005 Wedemark
- 424 006 Neustadt am Rübenberge (accidented, out of service)
- 424 007 Bad Nenndorf
- 424 011 Stadthagen
- 424 014 Springe
- 424 017 Bad Münder am Deister
- 424 018 Celle
- 424 019 Minden
- 424 021 Wunstorf
- 424 024 Seelze
- 424 025 Nienburg/Weser
- 424 027 Hannover
- 424 032 Bad Pyrmont
- 424 033 Hameln
- 424 035 Haste (accidented, out of service)
- 424 037 Langenhagen
- 424 038 Barsinghausen
- 424 039 Ronnenberg

=== Munich S-Bahn ===
To facilitate an increase of service on some lines, the Munich S-Bahn took over 16 vehicles from Hanover. The vehicles were planned to operate by autumn of 2022, which was subsequently delayed, as the trains should have been refitted and modernized before operation in Munich. The first vehicles started operation by autumn of 2023.

The vehicles are modernized with new passenger information displays in the form of 8 double facing monitors throughout the interior. 8 outward facing LED displays are fitted to the side vehicles and 2 on each end of the train. The seats were given the same colour as modernized class 423 units in Munich. WiFi service was added to the trains as well. Lastly, the toilets were removed to make way for a larger multiple-purpose area.

As the vehicles have a floor height difference of about 80 centimeters to the Class 423 (to which platform heights were built for), the Class 424 trains are only operated outside the Stammstrecke as shuttle and complementary rush hour services between Dachau & Altomünster (S20) and Geltendorf/Buchenau & the main station (S4). The Class 424 are also not fitted with necessary protection system that is needed to operate within the Stammstrecke.

=== Cologne S-Bahn ===
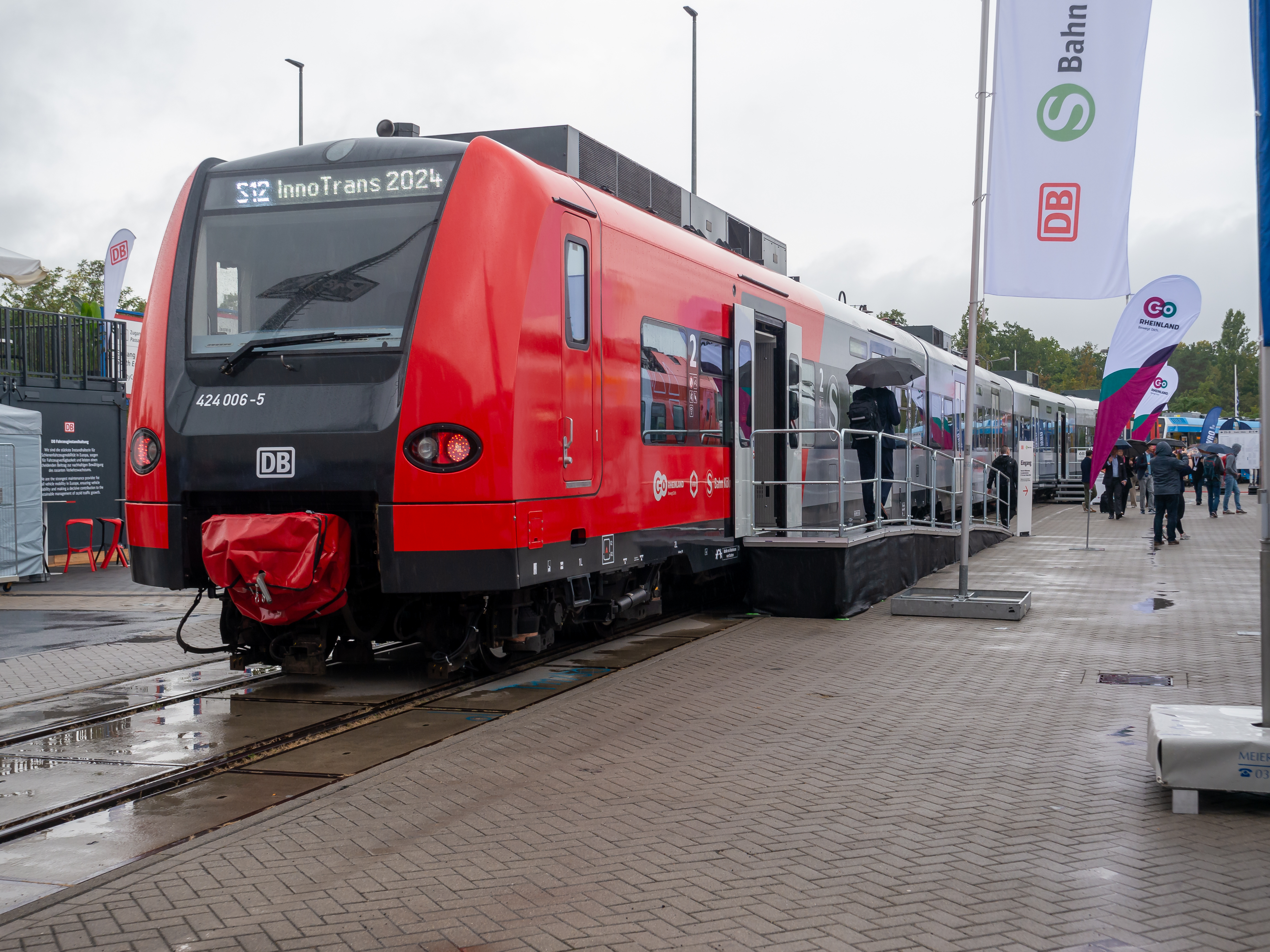
424 006 for the Cologne S-Bahn exhibited during Innotrans 2024

The role of the class 424 in the Cologne S-Bahn network is to replace aging class 420 units. The 24 units for Cologne underwent a redesign process by internal DB workshops in Krefeld and Hanover as well as by Vossloh Rolling Stock in Kiel. The vehicles were given a new colour scheme internally and externally. The livery was made to somewhat resemble that of the Cologne Stadtbahn, while the seat padding was given a turquoise colour. The units also feature new facilities such as new passenger information displays, outward facing LED displays and WiFi service, similar to Munich units. Unlike Munich units, the Cologne units also feature power outlets.

In December 2023, the modernization project received a special mention from the German Design Award 2024 in the category of "Aviation, Maritime and Railway".

The modernized vehicles were unveiled to the public in April 2024. The vehicles are planned to operate on lines S11, S12 and S68. Stations on these lines do not have uniform platform heights, being either 760 mm and 960 mm. Passengers will have an even entrance for the former and must take a step for the latter.
