= München Menterschwaige station =

Proposed railway station in Munich, Germany

Coordinates: 48°4′28.83″N 11°32′53.51″E

München Menterschwaige is a proposed railway station in Munich, to be built on the eastern bank of the river Isar, in the Menterschwaige district of the Munich borough of Untergiesing-Harlaching. If built, it will provide interchange options between regional train lines on the Munich-Holzkirchen line on the one hand, and the tram line 25 at nearby Großhesseloher Brücke tram station on the other, as well as improved public transportat access for the whole of the Menterschwaige district and nearby Grünwald with its film production sites at Bavaria Film Studios.
