= Ismaning station =

Railway station in Munich, Germany

Ismaning
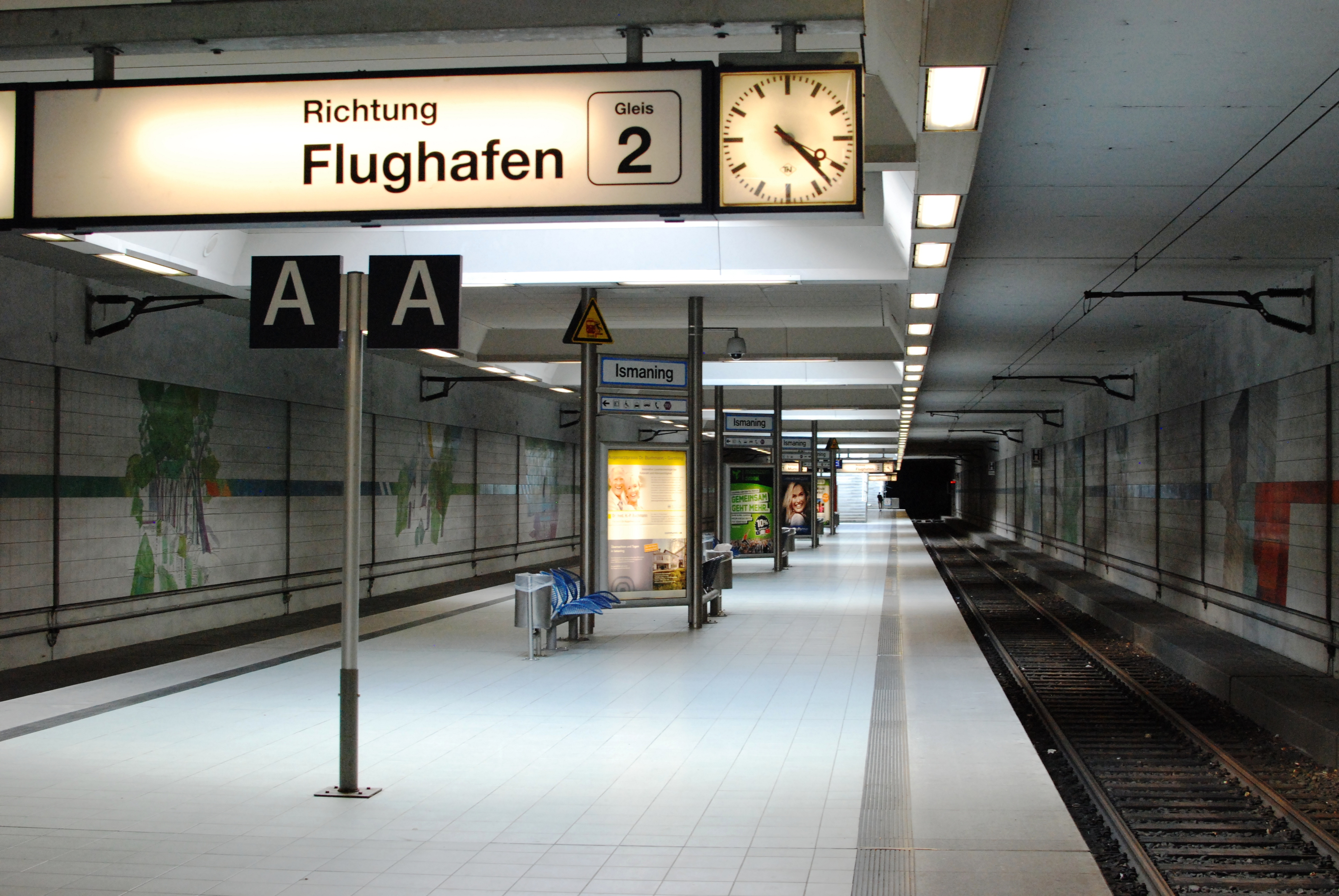
- Underground station in 2013

General information
- Location: Munich, Bavaria; Germany
- Coordinates: 48°13′33″N 11°40′45″E
- Owner: Deutsche Bahn
- Operator: DB Netz; DB Station&Service
- Lines: Munich East–Munich Airport (S8) (KBS 999.8)
- Platforms: 1 island platform
- Tracks: 2
- Train operators: S-Bahn München
- Connections: 230, 231, 236, 531, X202

Other information
- Station code: 3010
- DS100 code: MIS
- IBNR: 8003092
- Category: 4
- Fare zone: : 1
- Website: www.bahnhof.de

History
- Opened: original station: 5 June 1909; underground station: 17 May 1992
- Electrified: 21 October 1927; 98 years ago

Services
Preceding station	Munich S-Bahn	Following station
Unterföhring towards Herrsching	S8	Hallbergmoos towards Flughafen
Location
- Location within Bavaria Location within Germany Location within Europe

Ismaning station is a tunnel station on the Munich S-Bahn in the town of Ismaning in the northeast area of Munich, Germany. It is served by line S 8.

== History ==
Until 1992 the former above-ground station was the terminus of the old S 3 line from Nannhofen via Munich-Pasing – Munich Hauptbahnhof – Munich Ostbahnhof to Ismaning. Originally it was intended to extend the line to the Franz Josef Strauss Airport by running the present-day S 8 above ground through the district. After local protests it was decided to lay the S-Bahn route from the southern edge of the district to Osterfeldstrasse in a tunnel. The tunnel station was built at the same spot as the old station and was opened on 17 May 1992. The delay in constructing the S-Bahn link had no negative impact on the airport, because its construction was postponed by legal disputes.

Until 20 November 2005 Ismaning station was, apart from the tunnel station at the airport, the only underground S-Bahn station outside the main S-Bahn line in Munich. Since 21 November 2005 Unterföhring station has also been underground.

== Gallery ==
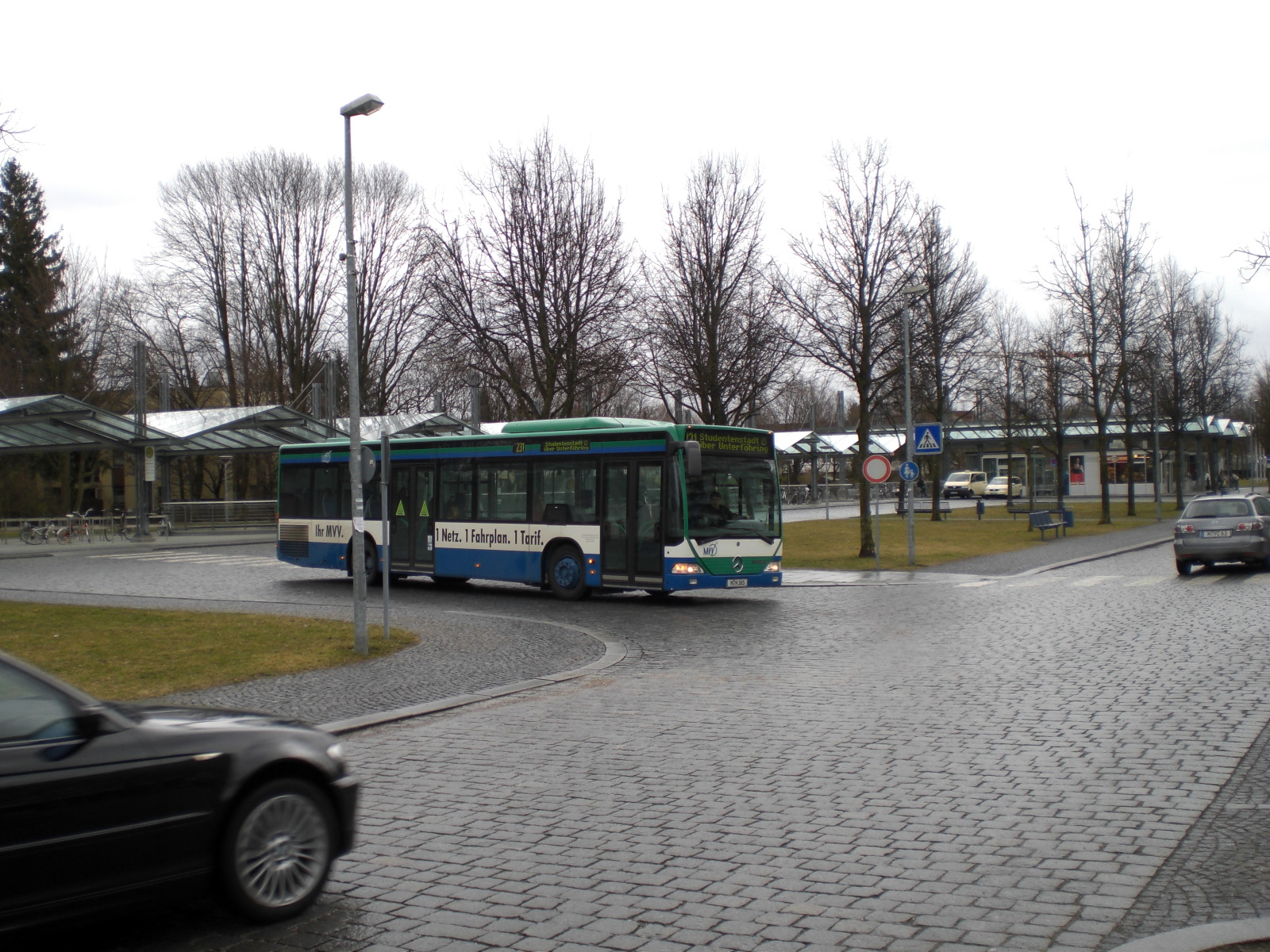
Station square in front of the station

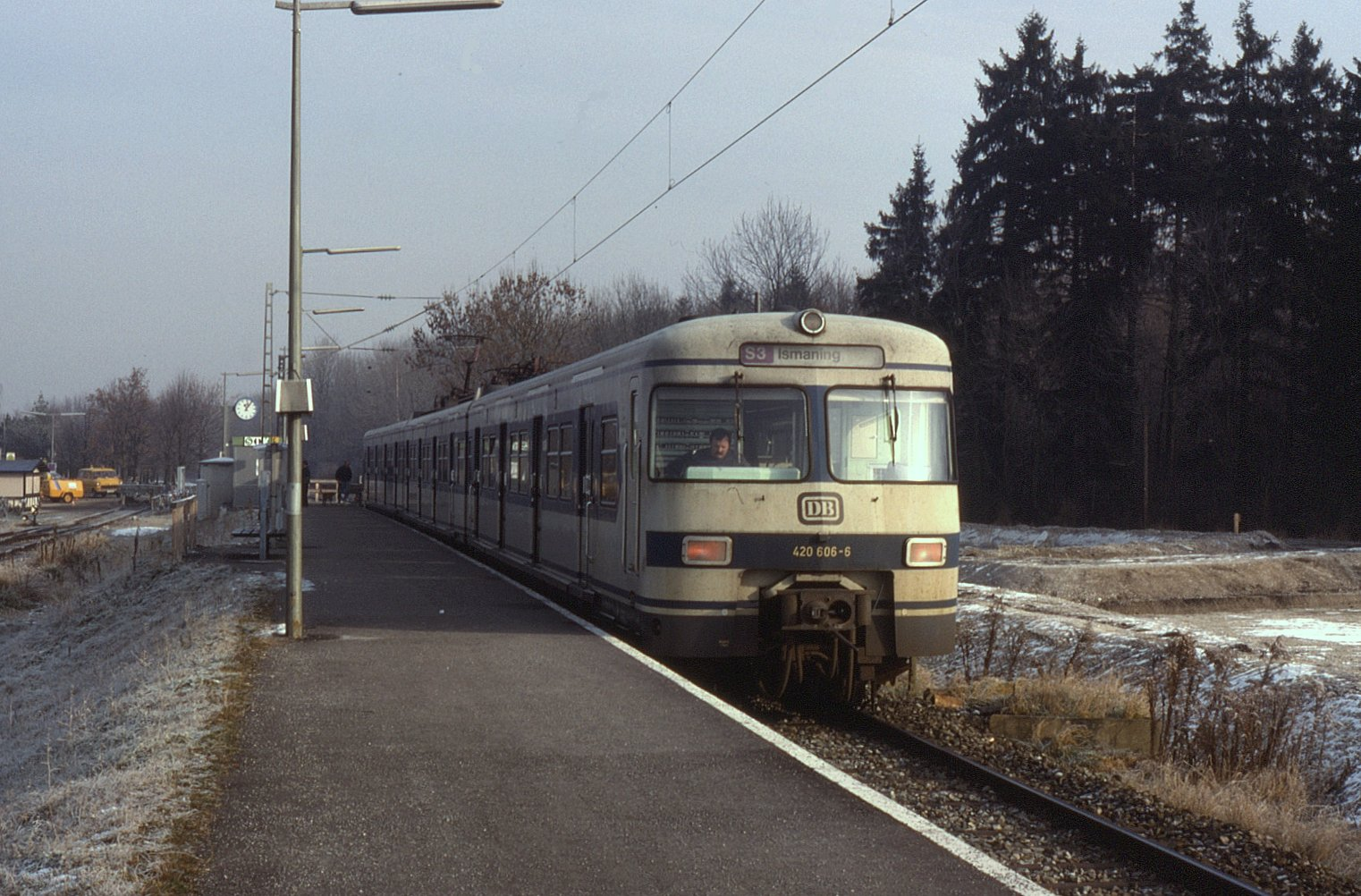
München S-Bahn EMU, 420.106 at the terminus station of Ismaning on a cold 4 December 1989. The line now continues further on to Munich Airport.
