= Freiham =

Coordinates: 48°8′13″N 11°24′8″E

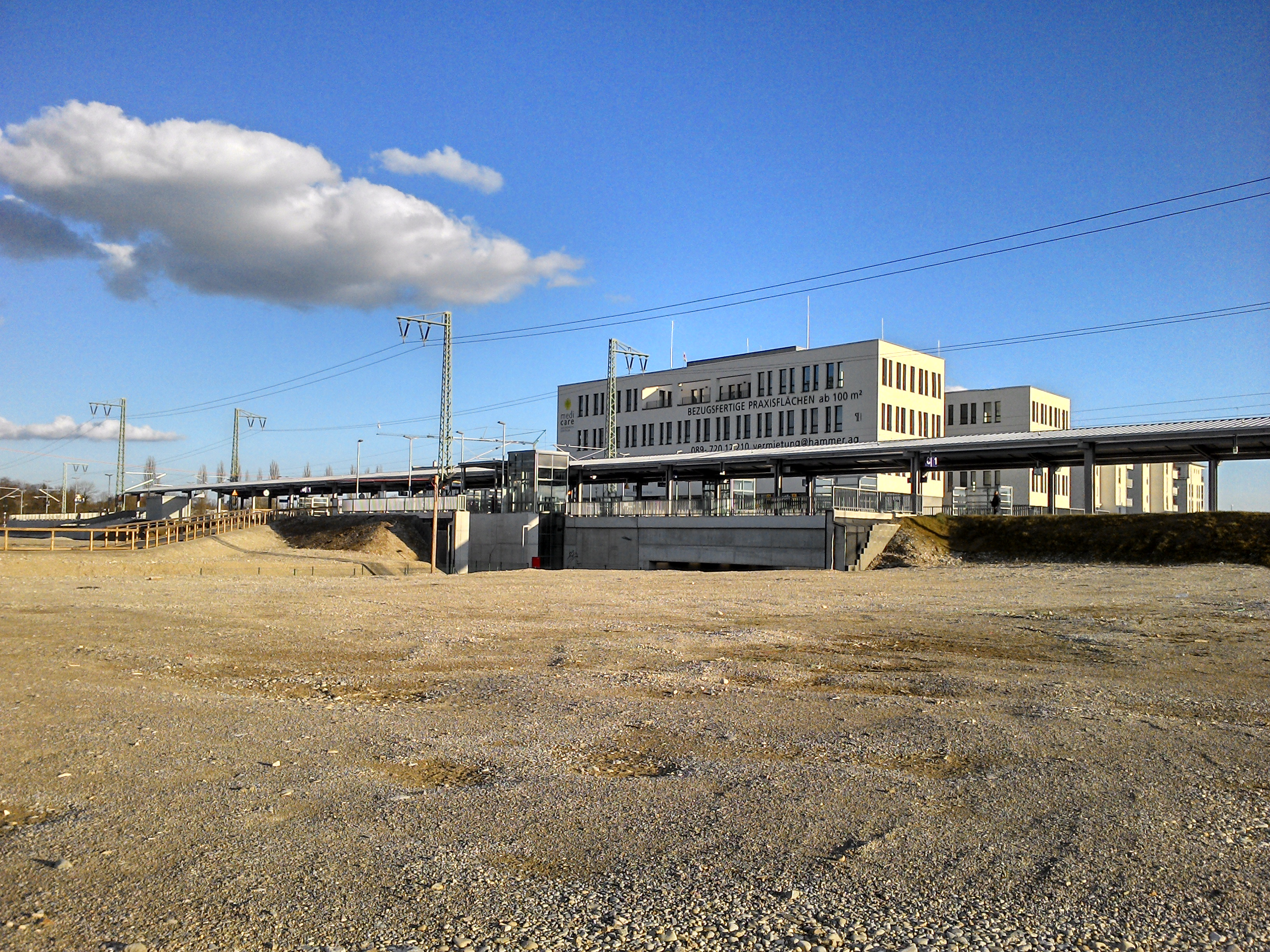
München Haltepunkt Freiham

Freiham is a district in the Munich borough of Aubing-Lochhausen-Langwied, in the west of Munich, Germany. The district is the location of a large development scheme consisting primarily of housing estates as well as small commercial-use buildings. The Construction is largely finished, with very few Construction sites left.

The town is connected to Munich by Munich S-Bahn at München Freiham railway station, which opened in 2009.
