= Munich North Ring =

Coordinates: 48.1903°N 11.5679°E

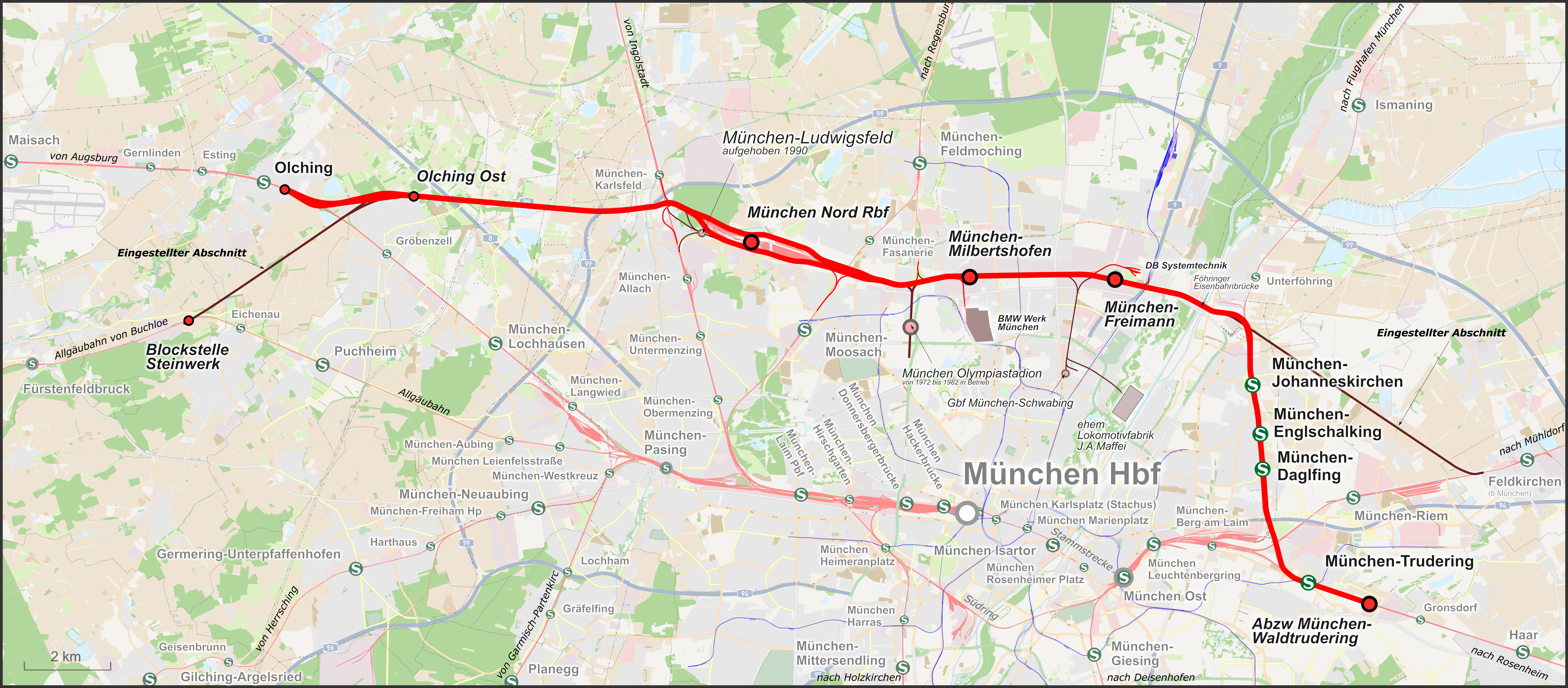

Overview
- Native name: Münchner Nordring
- Line number: 5560
- Locale: Bavaria, Germany

Technical
- Line length: 30.4 km (18.9 mi)
- Track gauge: 1,435 mm (4 ft 8 1/2 in) standard gauge
- Electrification: 15 kV/16.7 Hz AC overhead catenary

Munich North Ring (German: Münchner Nordring), section of which are only used by freight trains, is a railway bypass on the northern edge of the Bavarian state capital of Munich. The line’s importance for freight also partly arises from its access to the Munich North marshalling yard (Rangierbahnhof München Nord).

== Route ==
The North Ring begins at Olching station and initially runs north from Groebenzell to the Munich district of Allach. There are links with the Munich-Ingolstadt line before the line passes Munich North marshalling yard. Near the marshalling yard's exit tracks there is a connecting curve to Moosach on the line to Laim. Similarly, there is a connection to the Munich–Regensburg railway running to the north.

To the east of the marshalling yard, the line runs along the northern edge of the Olympic Village. Passenger services ran to the former München Olympiastadion station, which is located on the line here, during the 1972 Summer Olympics.

There are two freight yards on the course of the line to the east at Milbertshofen and Freimann. West of Milbertshofen yard a siding branches off to BMW’s plant 1. Further east a line formerly branched off to the Munich-Schwabing freight yard; this line is now used for the tracks of tram line 23. East of Freimann yard is a siding to line U 6 of the Munich U-Bahn, which is used for the delivery of U-Bahn trains. After crossing the Isar river on the Föhring railway bridge, the line merges with the Munich East–Munich Airport railway, which it separates from at Daglfing station. It runs over a connecting curve to Trudering station and shortly later it connects with the Munich–Rosenheim railway.

Until after the Second World War there was also a branch of the line from Johanneskirchen to Feldkirchen on the Munich–Mühldorf railway in the east and from Roggenstein on the Munich-Buchloe railway to Olching. There are still signs of them although the tracks have been dismantled. Nevertheless, the official chainage still starts in Roggenstein.

== History ==
=== Moosach–Schwabing ===
The first section the railway that later became the Munich North Ring was opened on 1 October 1901. It was a local railway for freight traffic only from Moosach station near Munich on the Munich–Landshut railway via Milbertshofen to München-Schwabing.

=== Munich-East–Schwabing ===
The Munich East–Ismaning local railway was opened on 5 June 1909. At the same time, another local railway for freight traffic was opened from Johanneskirchen, a station on this line, to München-Schwabing. This completed the first stage of development of the Munich North Ring.

=== Connection to Mühldorf ===
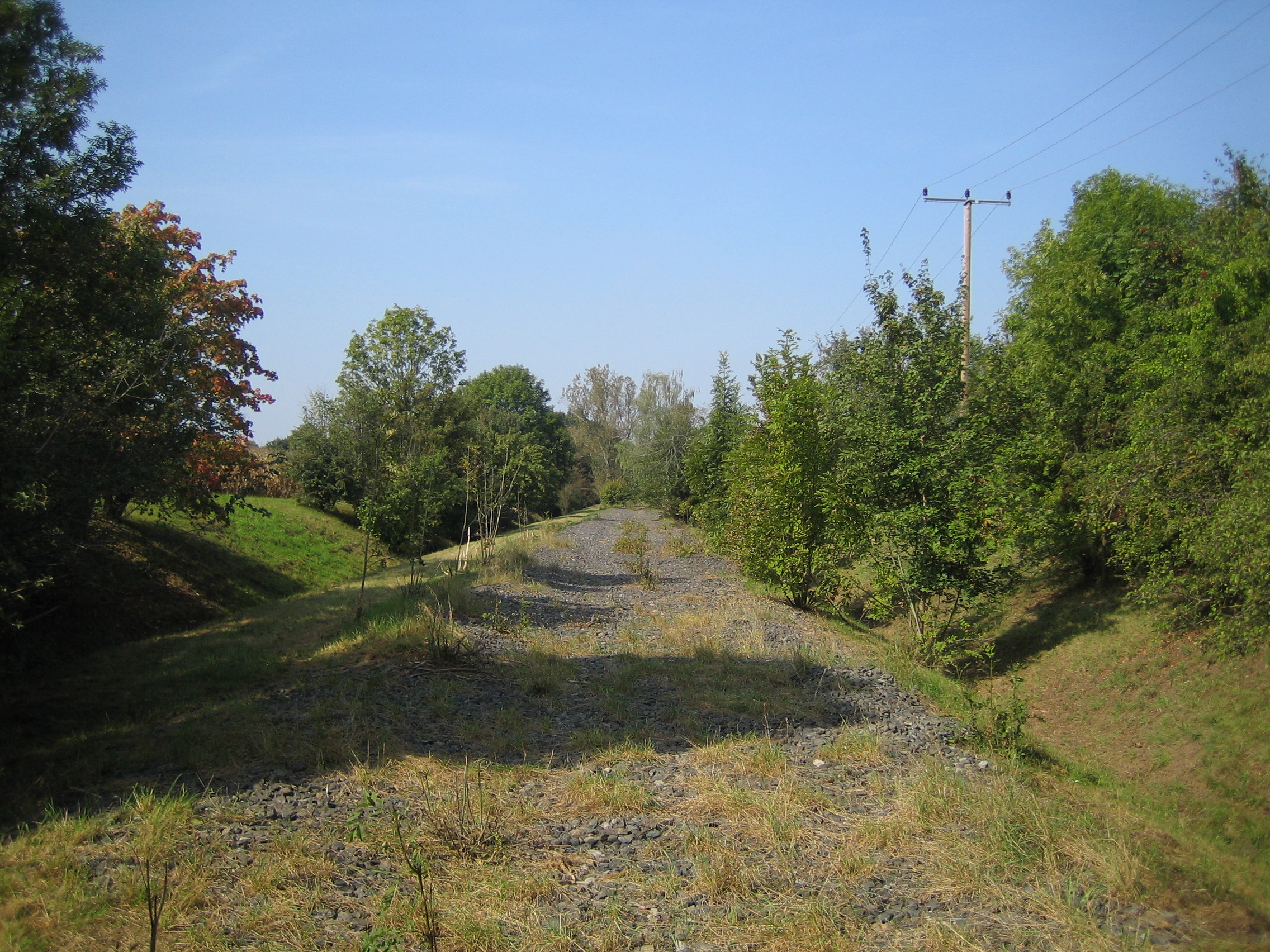
Former railway from Johanneskirchen to Feldkirchen

The direct connection of the North Ring to the Mühldorf line was completed from Johanneskirchen to Feldkirchen in 1941. An extension of the line to Zorneding on the Rosenheim line was planned, but was not completed. After the Second World War, the connection was abandoned. It was not in operation even for five years.

== Freight ==
The line is used by many national and international freight trains. These included, among others, services of the Manching–Brennersee rolling highway until its closure.

=== Local traffic ===
The Milbertshofen yard is mainly used by the oil industry rather than other freight. Traffic from BMW is also handled at Milbertshofen.

Only a few sidings at Freimann yard are still used, serving traffic to and from Milbertshofen. Among others users, its serves various firms in Euro-Industriepark, which contains cash and carry businesses.

North of Johanneskirchen is the Heizkraftwerk Nord ("combined heat and power station north") of Stadtwerke München, which is served with block trains carrying coal.

== Passenger services ==
Except for a few night trains and the line S 8 S-Bahn services to the airport, there are no scheduled passenger services on the North Ring. The line is only used for diversions if there are obstructions on the line via Munich South or between Olching and Laim.

== Freimann workshop ==
Just south of Freimann yard was the former Ausbesserungswerk München-Freimann, where several thousand people once worked. Today part of it is still used for the research and technology centre of Deutsche Bahn and still houses experimental vehicles. The area of the former workshop is now used in many ways—parts of it is used for the Euro-Industriepark and the Zenith exhibition centre.
