= Munich East–Munich Airport railway =

Double-track and electrified main line in Bavaria, Germany

Overview
- Line number: 5556
- Locale: Bavaria, Germany

Service
- Route number: 999.8

Technical
- Track gauge: 1,435 mm (4 ft 8 1/2 in) standard gauge
- Electrification: 15 kV/16.7 Hz AC overhead catenary

The Munich East–Munich Airport railway is a double-track and electrified main line in the German state of Bavaria that connects the city of Munich to Munich Airport, which is located 30 kilometres to the northeast. It is operated of DB Netz AG and integrated in the Munich S-Bahn as part of line S 8.

== Route ==
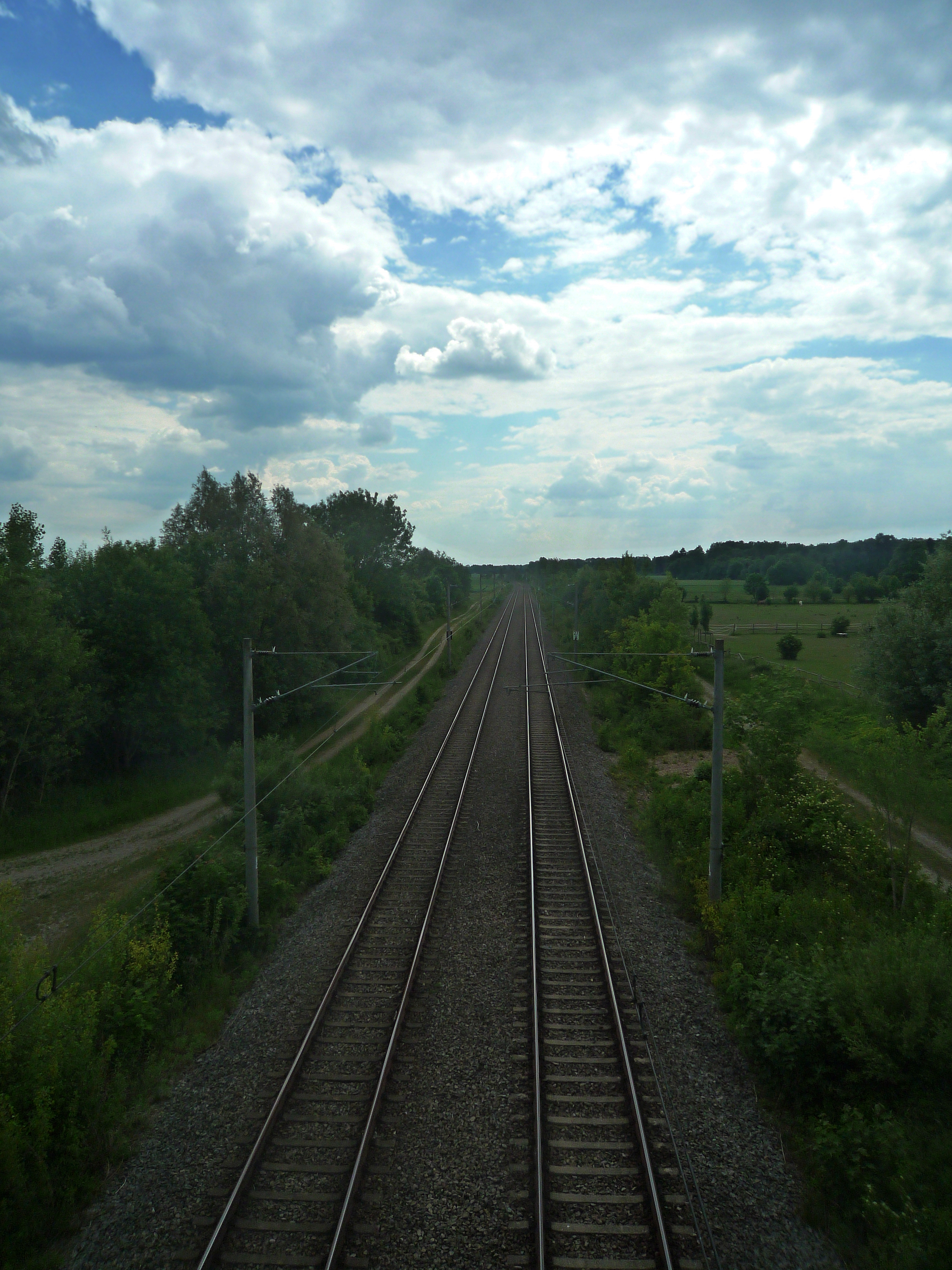
Line at Hallbergmoos, looking towards Munich

The route begins at Munich East station and runs from there to the east. On the heights of the S-Bahn Steinhausen workshop the line turns north and meets the connecting curve to München Trudering station. From there the line shares the tracks with the North Ring. In this section are the stations of Daglfing, Englschalking and Johanneskirchen. On the heights of the Heizkraftwerk Nord ("combined heat and power station north") the North Ring branches off to the west at a grade separated junction and the line reaches Unterföhring station, which is located in a tunnel. After crossing the Central Isar Canal (German: Mittlere-Isar-Kanal) and tunnelling under the Munich Ring Road, the line crosses fields to Ismaning before entering a tunnel. After Ismaning station the line returns to the surface. After passing under federal highway 471, it runs parallel to federal highway 388 to Fischerhäuser. Near Erching and the former Erching transmitter, the line passes Hallbergmoos station. This is far outside of Hallbergmoos town. Before the airport, the line reaches München Flughafen (Munich Airport) West junction, connecting with the link from Neufahrn. Both lines run via Flughafen Besucherpark ("airport visitor parking") station and then into a tunnel under the west apron and Terminal 1 to the end of the line at Munich Airport Terminal station, which is located below the central area of the airport.

== History ==
The line between Munich East and Ismaning opened on 5 June 1909. The North Ring, which shares part of the route, went into operation simultaneously. The town of Erding and the municipality of Oberföhring requested an extension of the railway from Ismaning to Erding. This line has not been realised.

The line has been electrified since 21 October 1927. Zamdorf station was closed in 1959. In the late 1960s, the track was threatened by closure, but instead it was integrated into the network of the Munich S-Bahn. Following the opening of the S-Bahn on 28 May 1972, the route to Ismaning was temporarily converted to bus operation. The line had a few special services that ran to München Olympiastadion station over the North Ring. S-Bahn trains did not run to Ismaning until 30 September 1973. With the introduction of S-Bahn services two stations were closed, München Ost Rangierbahnhof (Munich East marshalling yard) and Föhringer Kanal. At the same time Leuchtenbergring station was opened.

In order to link the new Munich Airport in the Erdinger Moos (Erding bog) to the rail network, it was decided to extend the line from Ismaning. The original plans were for an above-ground track past Ismaning. The municipality of Ismaning called for a tunnel through its neighbourhood. While construction work between Ismaning and the airport started in 1985, the dispute over the location of the line in the town continued. In 1988 was finally decided to build an underground station. Since 1992, line S 8 has run to the airport. A section in Unterföhring remained single track at first. This section was only duplicated in 2005. As in Ismaning the line and station were placed underground. A large part of the additional costs compared to an above-ground line took was borne by the municipality of Unterföhring.

== Operations ==
The only traffic on the line today are the Munich S-Bahn line S 8 services, which links the airport to the city centre.

In the past, there was also freight traffic, consisting mainly of peat, bricks, cabbages and sauerkraut. The latter led to the line being referred to as the Krautexpress.

== Future ==
An even better public transport connection from the airport to the city centre is planned. To shorten the journey time, an Airport Express service that does not stop at all (or any) intervening stations is under consideration. There is a problem that a section of the line is shared with the North Ring. On this section of the line there are level crossings at the stations of Englschalking and Daglfing. These would be closed even longer than before by an upgrade to four tracks carrying more traffic. The area east of the line is also planned for a large residential area, which would then also be connected via the crossings. Possible solutions are the relocation of part of the track in a tunnel or the construction of road bridges and underpasses in the area. Another aspect is the impact of noise on the neighbourhood, which therefore has demanded a tunnel.

The line to the airport may be extended to Erding under the "Erding Ring Closure" (Erdinger Ringschluss) project in order to allow a third S-Bahn line to connect to the airport and to allow a connection towards Mühldorf.
