= Lohhof station =

Munich S-Bahn station

Lohhof
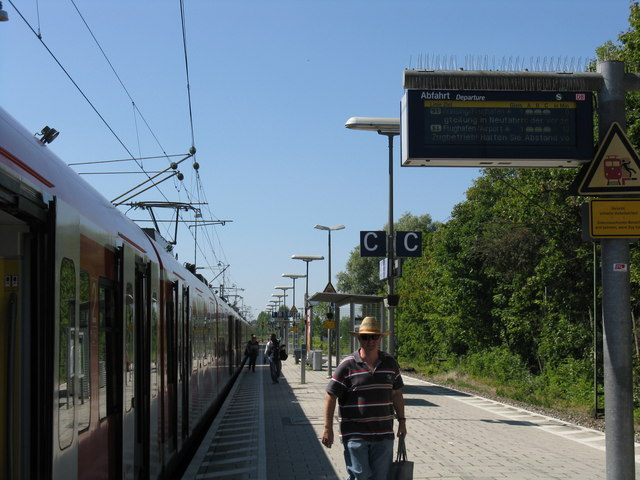
- 2012

General information
- Location: Südliche Ingolstädter Straße 2; 85716 Unterschleißheim; Bavaria; Germany
- Coordinates: 48°17′18″N 11°34′54″E
- Owner: Deutsche Bahn
- Operator: DB Netz; DB Station&Service
- Line: Munich–Regensburg railway
- Platforms: 1 island platform
- Tracks: 2
- Train operators: S-Bahn München
- Connections: 215, 218, 693, 771, 7020, X206

Other information
- Station code: 3764
- DS100 code: MLH
- IBNR: 8003735
- Category: 5
- Fare zone: : 1 and 2
- Website: www.bahnhof.de

History
- Opened: 3 November 1858; 167 years ago

Services
Preceding station	Munich S-Bahn	Following station
Unterschleißheim towards Munich Leuchtenbergring	S1	Eching towards Freising or Munich Airport Terminal
Location
- Location within Bavaria Location within Germany Location within Europe

Lohhof station is a railway station in the Lohhof district of the town of Unterschleißheim, located in the Munich district in Upper Bavaria, Bavaria, Germany.
