= Unterschleißheim station =

Munich S-Bahn station

Unterschleißheim
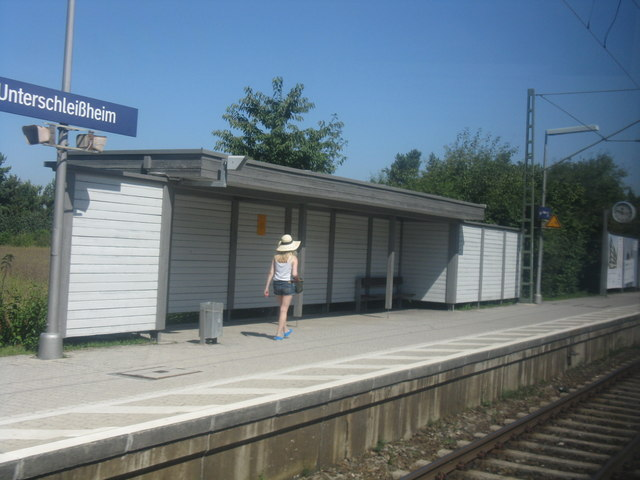
- 2012

General information
- Location: Pegasusstraße 15; 85716 Unterschleißheim; Bavaria; Germany
- Coordinates: 48°16′26″N 11°34′08″E
- Owner: Deutsche Bahn
- Operator: DB Netz; DB Station&Service
- Line: Munich–Regensburg railway
- Platforms: 2 side platforms
- Tracks: 2
- Train operators: DB Regio Bayern; S-Bahn München
- Connections: 215, 218, 219, 291, 299, 772, X202

Other information
- Station code: 6363
- DS100 code: MUSM
- IBNR: 8006688
- Category: 5
- Fare zone: : 1 and 2
- Website: www.bahnhof.de

History
- Opened: 17 December 1977; 48 years ago

Services
Preceding station	DB Regio Bayern	Following station
Feldmoching towards München Hbf	RB 33	Freising towards Landshut Hbf
Preceding station	Munich S-Bahn	Following station
Oberschleißheim towards Leuchtenbergring	S1	Lohhof towards Freising or Flughafen
Location

Unterschleißheim station is a railway station in the town of Unterschleißheim, located in the Munich district in Upper Bavaria, Bavaria, Germany.
