= Eching station =

Munich S-Bahn station

Eching
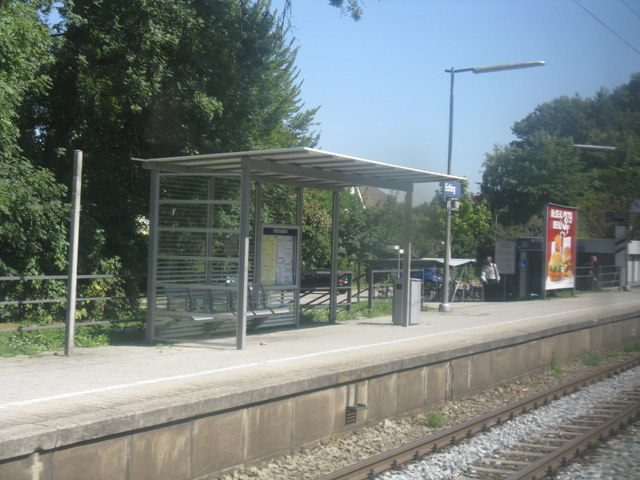
- 2012

General information
- Location: Dresdener Straße; 85386 Eching; Bavaria; Germany
- Coordinates: 48°18′11″N 11°37′01″E
- System: Hp
- Owner: Deutsche Bahn
- Operator: DB Netz; DB Station&Service
- Line: Munich–Regensburg railway
- Platforms: 2 side platforms
- Tracks: 2
- Train operators: S-Bahn München
- Connections: 690, 691, 693, 695, 696

Other information
- Station code: 1450
- DS100 code: MEC
- IBNR: 8001647
- Category: 5
- Fare zone: : 2 and 3
- Website: www.bahnhof.de

History
- Opened: 5 August 1889; 137 years ago

Services
Preceding station	Munich S-Bahn	Following station
Lohhof towards Munich Leuchtenbergring	S1	Neufahrn bei Freising towards Freising or Munich Airport Terminal
Location
- Location within Bavaria Location within Germany Location within Europe

Eching station is a railway station in the municipality of Eching, located in the Freising district in Upper Bavaria, Bavaria, Germany.
