= Munich-Fasanerie station =

Munich S-Bahn station

Munich Fasanerie
- 2024

General information
- Location: Feldmochinger Straße 216; 80995 Munich; Feldmoching-Hasenbergl; Bavaria; Germany
- Coordinates: 48°11′52″N 11°31′33″E
- Owner: Deutsche Bahn
- Operator: DB Netz; DB Station&Service
- Line: Munich–Regensburg railway
- Platforms: 2 side platforms
- Tracks: 2
- Train operators: S-Bahn München
- Connections: 175, N71

Other information
- Station code: 4251
- DS100 code: MFAS
- IBNR: 8004145
- Category: 5
- Fare zone: : M and 1
- Website: www.bahnhof.de

History
- Opened: 1 May 1896; 130 years ago

Services
Preceding station	Munich S-Bahn	Following station
Moosach towards Leuchtenbergring	S1	Feldmoching towards Freising or Flughafen
Location

Munich-Fasanerie station is a railway station in the Feldmoching-Hasenbergl borough of Munich, Germany.
