= Oberschleißheim station =

Munich S-Bahn station

Oberschleißheim
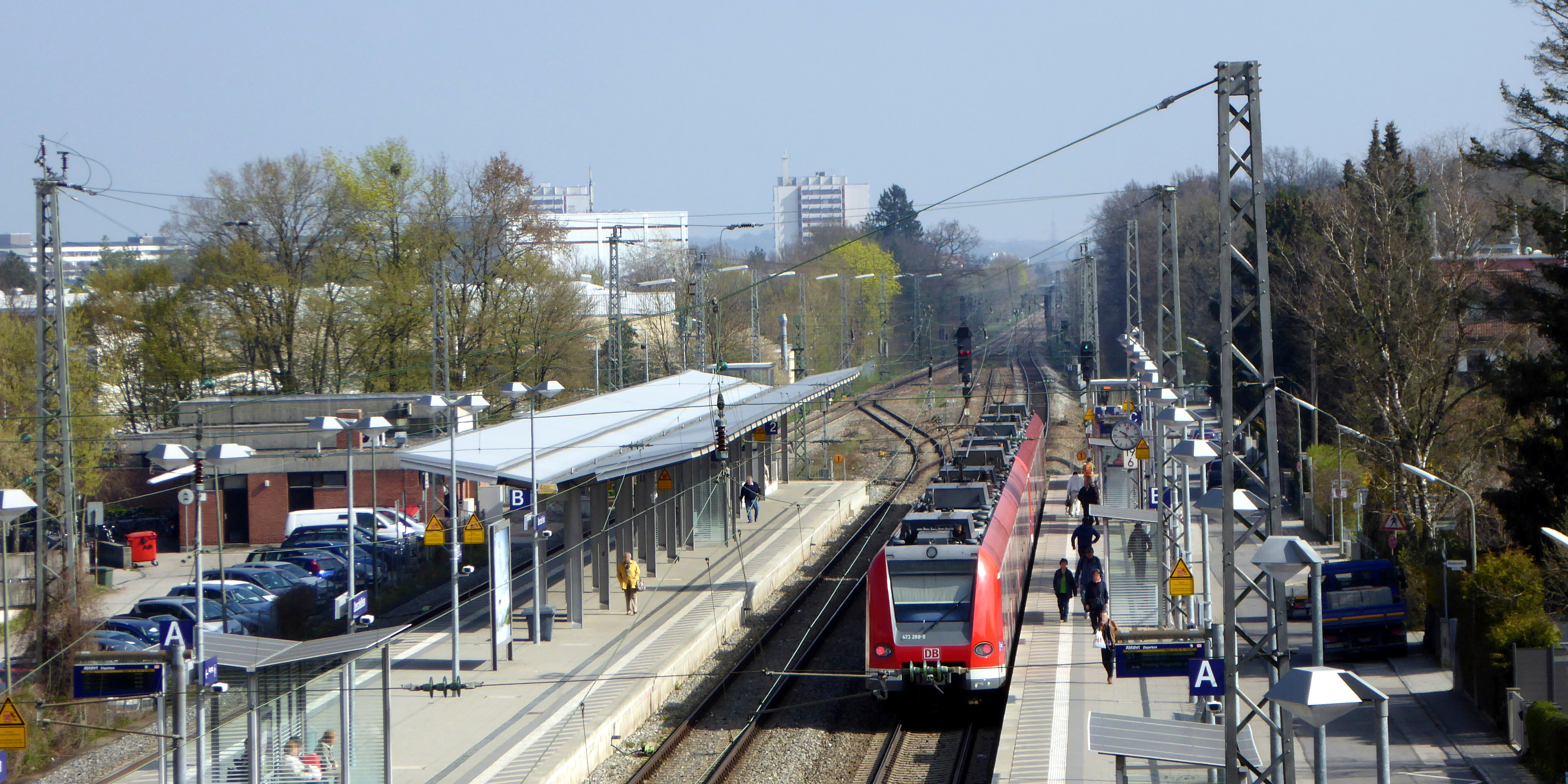
- Modern S-Bahn Station in Oberschleissheim

General information
- Location: Oberschleißheim, Bavaria; Germany
- Coordinates: 48°15′25″N 11°33′27″E
- Owner: Deutsche Bahn
- Operator: DB Netz; DB Station&Service
- Lines: Munich–Regensburg (KBS 930)
- Platforms: 3
- Connections: 291, 292, 295, X201, X206

Construction
- Accessible: Yes

Other information
- Station code: 4688
- DS100 code: MOSM
- IBNR: 8004580
- Category: 4
- Fare zone: : 1 and 2
- Website: stationsdatenbank.de; www.bahnhof.de

History
- Opened: 28 May 1972

Services
Preceding station	Munich S-Bahn	Following station
Feldmoching towards Leuchtenbergring	S1	Unterschleißheim towards Freising or Flughafen
Location

Oberschleißheim station is located in the town of Oberschleißheim in the German state of Bavaria and is served by the Munich S-Bahn. It lies on the Munich–Regensburg railway, about 20 kilometres from the Munich Central Station (Hauptbahnhof).

== Schleissheim station ==
A station was built in Oberschleißheim in the late 1850s as part of the original Munich-Regensburg Railway. This station was just west of Schleissheim Palace. In addition to the facilities for passenger operations there were freight tracks, some company sidings, a branch line to Garching-Hochbrück and a siding to Schleissheim Airfield (Flugplatz Schleißheim, the oldest operating airport in Germany, built in 1912). With the construction of the Munich S-Bahn in 1972, the station was closed for passenger traffic and replaced by the new Oberschleißheim station. This was built a kilometre towards Freising. The handling of freight wagons stopped in the mid-1980s and the sidings were gradually dismantled. The station building is preserved and can be seen from the line. Some disused tracks, which are overgrown with grass, are visible to the west of the line. Today at the location of the station there is only a crossover between the two tracks, which is remotely controlled.

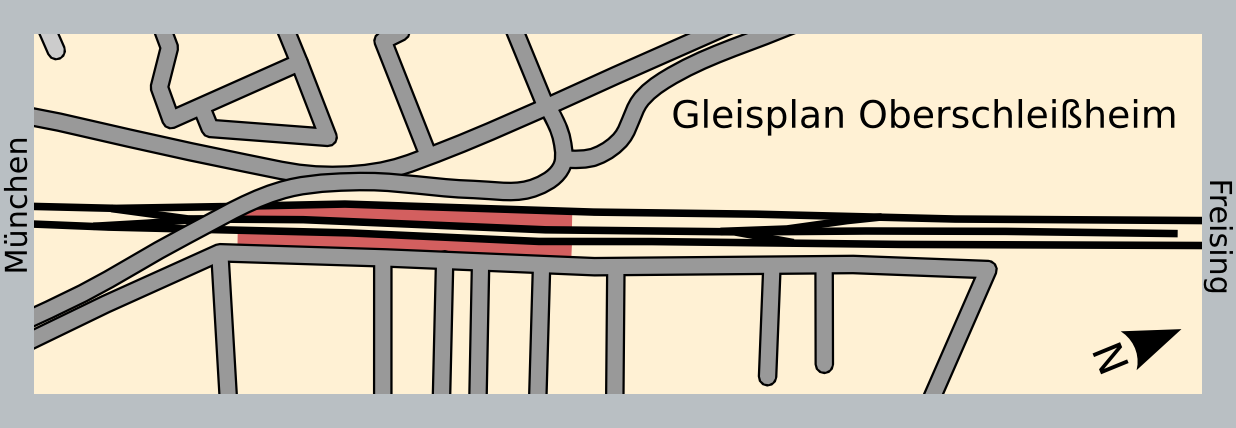
Track plan

The current station is situated in the northern part of the village. The station has three platform tracks. Track 1 is used by line S1 services of the Munich S-Bahn towards the city centre. Track 2 is used by S-Bahn services terminating or starting in Oberschleißheim or being overhauled. A single-track siding to the north of the station is reached from here. Track 3 is used by S-Bahn trains towards Freising and the Airport. Track 1 and 2 are located on a central platform, while track 3 is on a side platform. The platform can be reached through underpasses. The northern underpasses has lifts, giving access for the disabled, and connects to the bus stop in the station forecourt. Park and ride parking is at the southern end of the station. The southern end of the station is crossed by a road bridge.

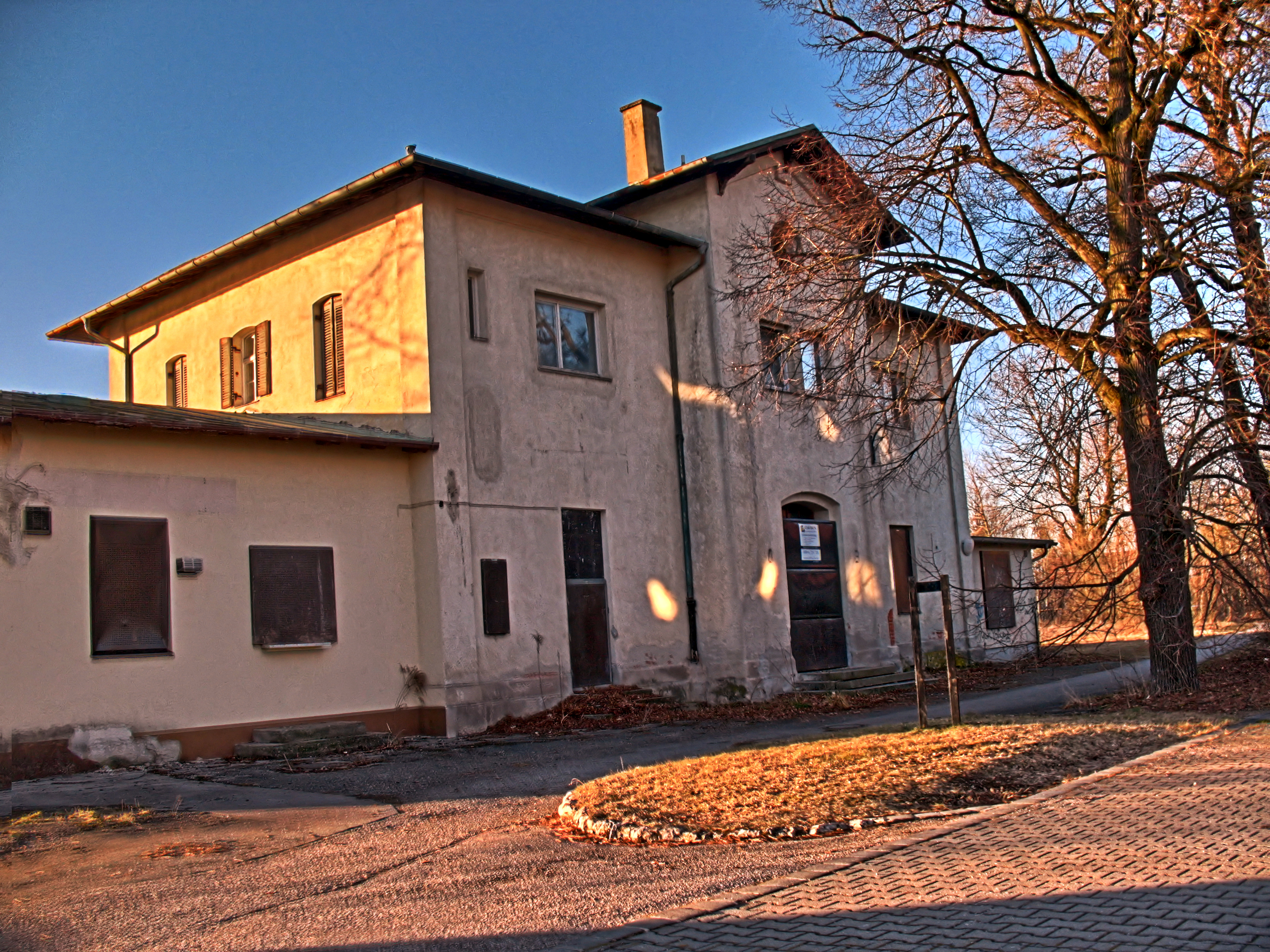
Former Schleißheim station, (built in the 1850s) about 1 km to the south of the modern station
