= Munich Airport Besucherpark station =

Munich S-Bahn station

Flughafen München Besucherpark
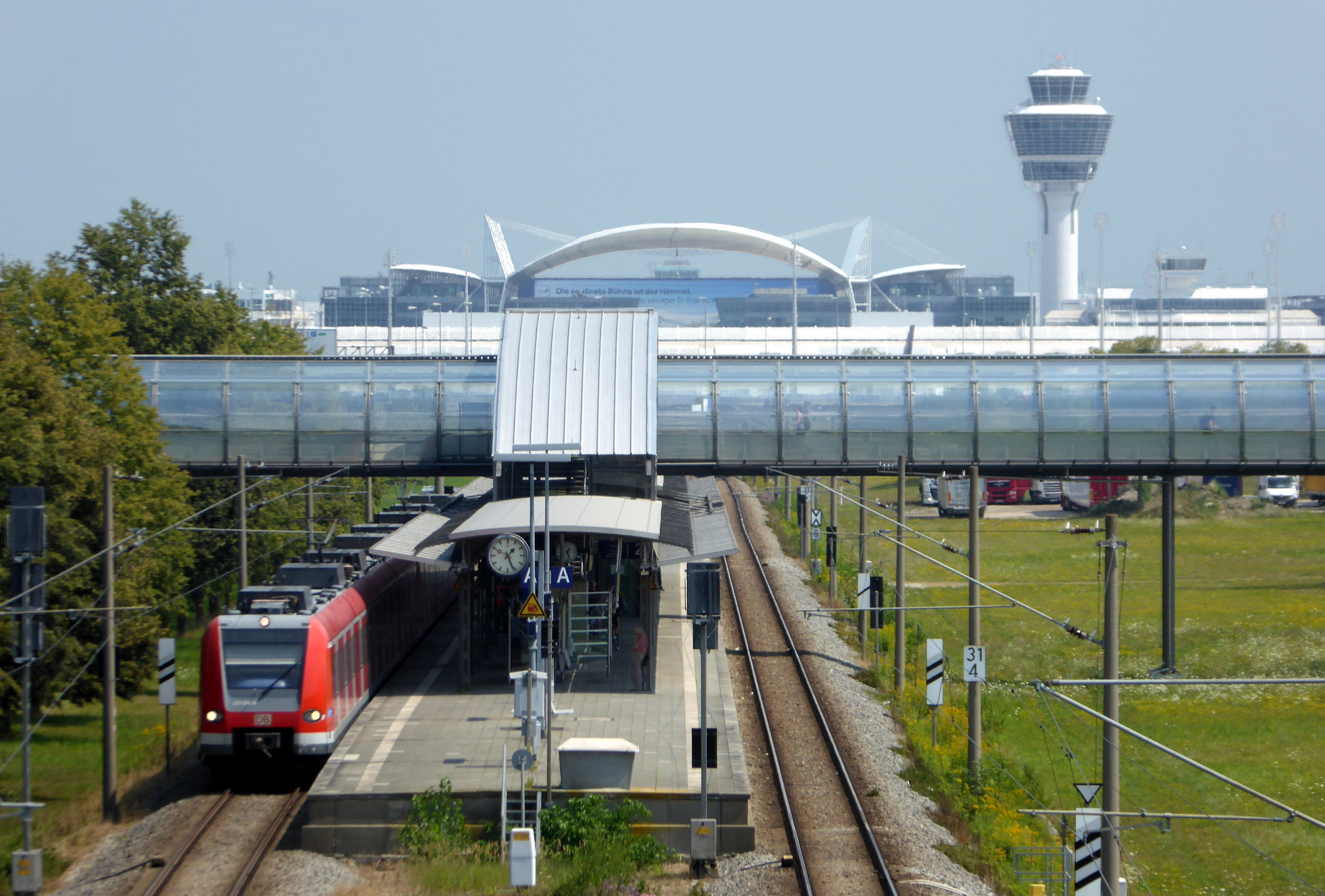
- 2018

General information
- Location: Munich Airport; Flughafen Besucherpark; 85354 Freising; Bavaria; Germany
- Coordinates: 48°21′08″N 11°45′51″E
- Owner: Deutsche Bahn
- Operator: DB Netz; DB Station&Service
- Line: Munich East–Munich Airport railway
- Platforms: 1 island platform
- Tracks: 2
- Train operators: S-Bahn München
- Connections: 635, X109

Other information
- Station code: 1823
- DS100 code: MFHB
- IBNR: 8004167
- Category: 4
- Fare zone: : 5
- Website: www.bahnhof.de

History
- Opened: 7 March 1992; 34 years ago

Services
Preceding station	Agilis / DB Regio Bayern	Following station
Freising towards Nürnberg Hbf	RE 22 Some trains	Munich Airport Terminus
Preceding station	Munich S-Bahn	Following station
Neufahrn bei Freising towards Munich Leuchtenbergring	S1	Munich Airport Terminal Terminus
Hallbergmoos towards Herrsching	S8	Munich Airport Terminal towards Flughafen
Location
- Location within Bavaria Location within Germany Location within Europe

Munich Airport Besucherpark station is a Munich S-Bahn railway station at Munich Airport, Bavaria, Germany. It is situated to the west of the Munich Airport Terminal station.
