= Pulling station =

Munich S-Bahn station

Pulling (b Freising)
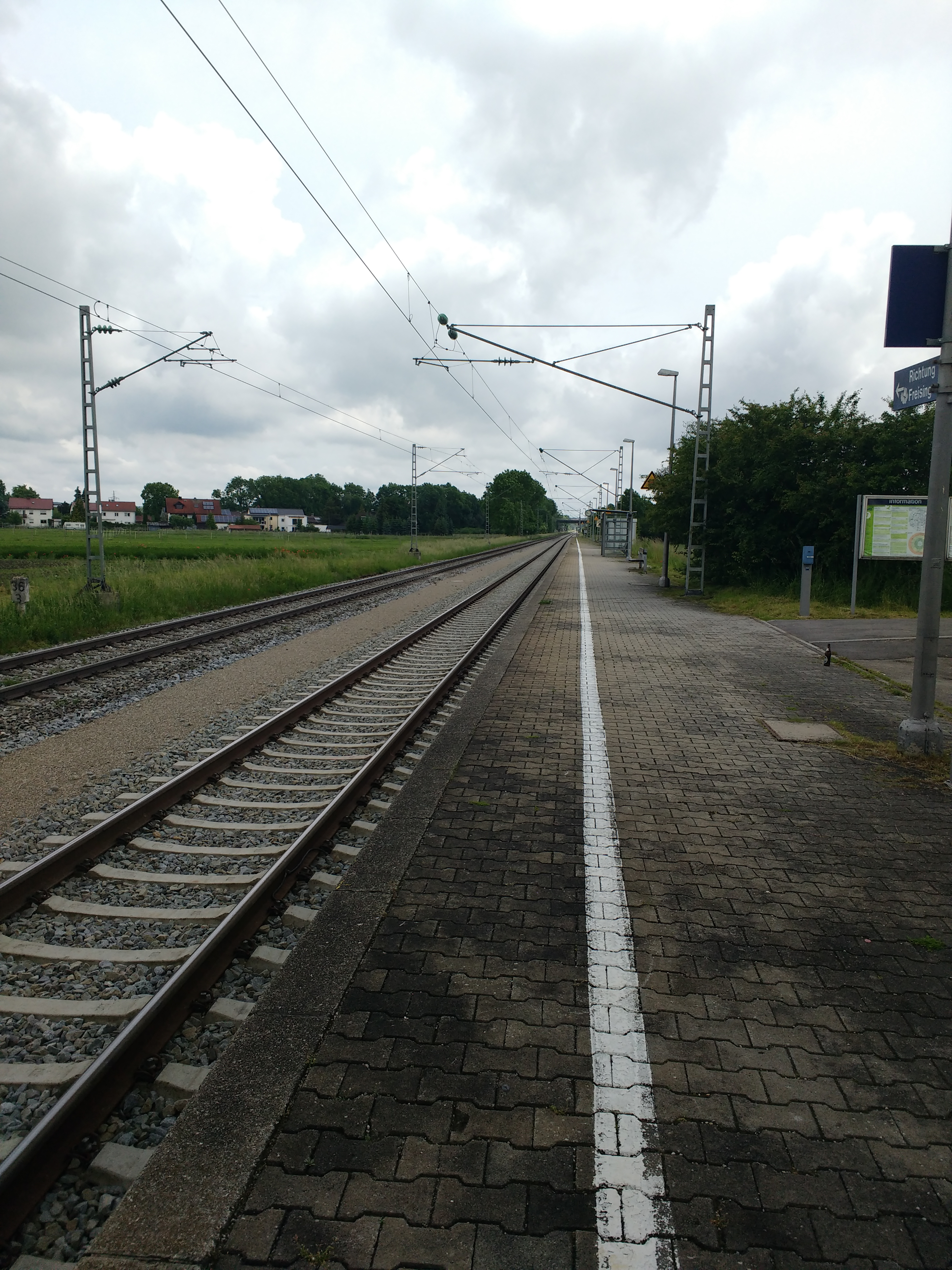
- 2016

General information
- Location: Bahnstr. 85354 Pulling; Bavaria; Germany
- Coordinates: 48.364°N 11.708°E
- Owner: Deutsche Bahn
- Operator: DB Netz; DB Station&Service
- Line: Munich–Regensburg railway
- Platforms: 2
- Tracks: 2
- Train operators: S-Bahn München
- Connections: 6003

Other information
- Station code: 5058
- DS100 code: MPU
- IBNR: 8004900
- Category: 5
- Fare zone: : 4
- Website: www.bahnhof.de

History
- Opened: 1 June 1886

Services
Preceding station	Munich S-Bahn	Following station
Neufahrn bei Freising towards Munich Leuchtenbergring	S1	Freising Terminus
Location
- Location within Bavaria Location within Germany Location within Europe

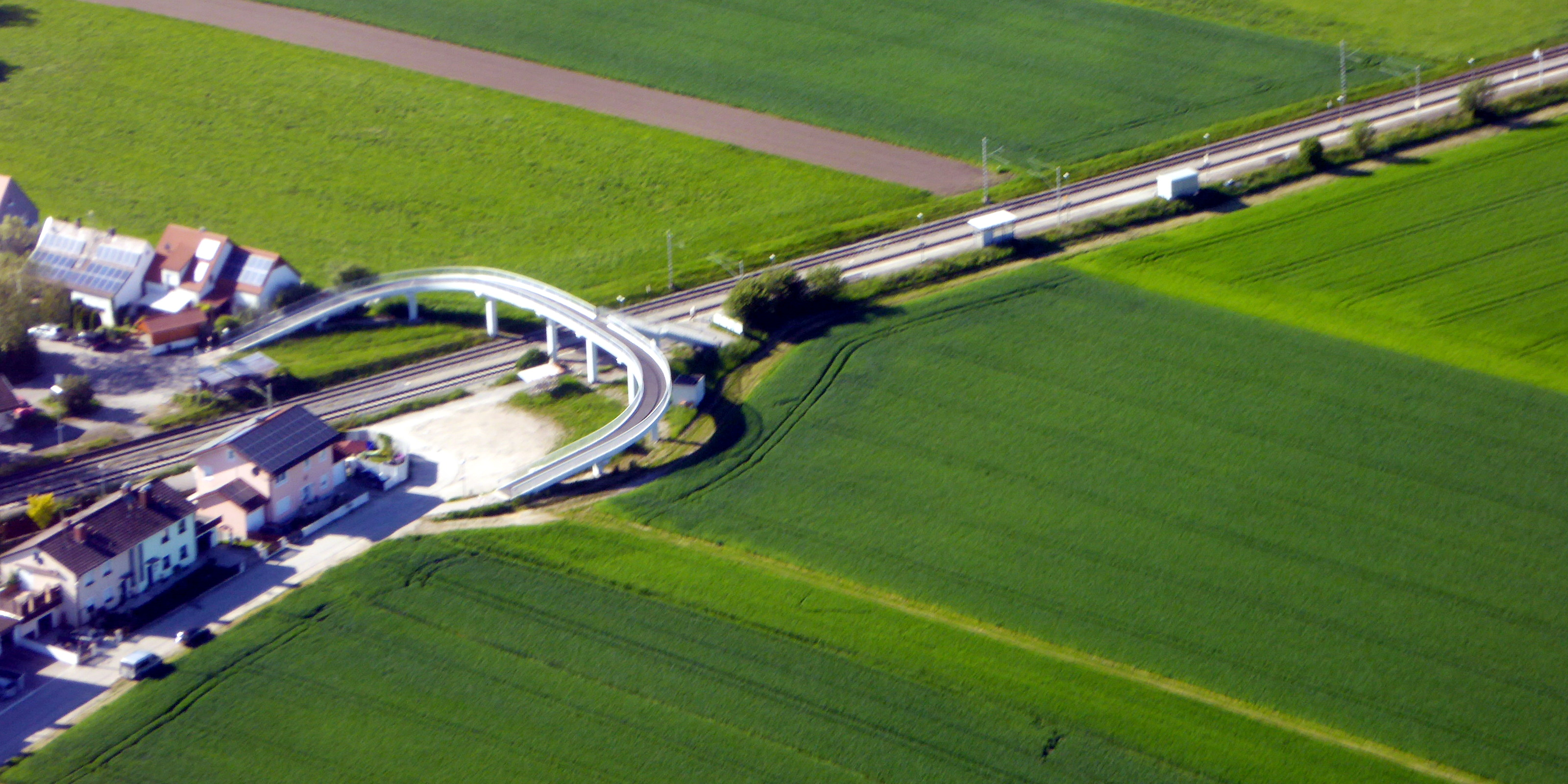
Pulling station, seen from the south (May 2017).

Pulling (b Freising) station is a railway station on the Munich S-Bahn in the municipality of Pulling, district of Freising in the northeast area of Munich, Germany. It is served by the S-Bahn line S1.
