= Munich-Moosach station =

Munich railway station

München Moosach
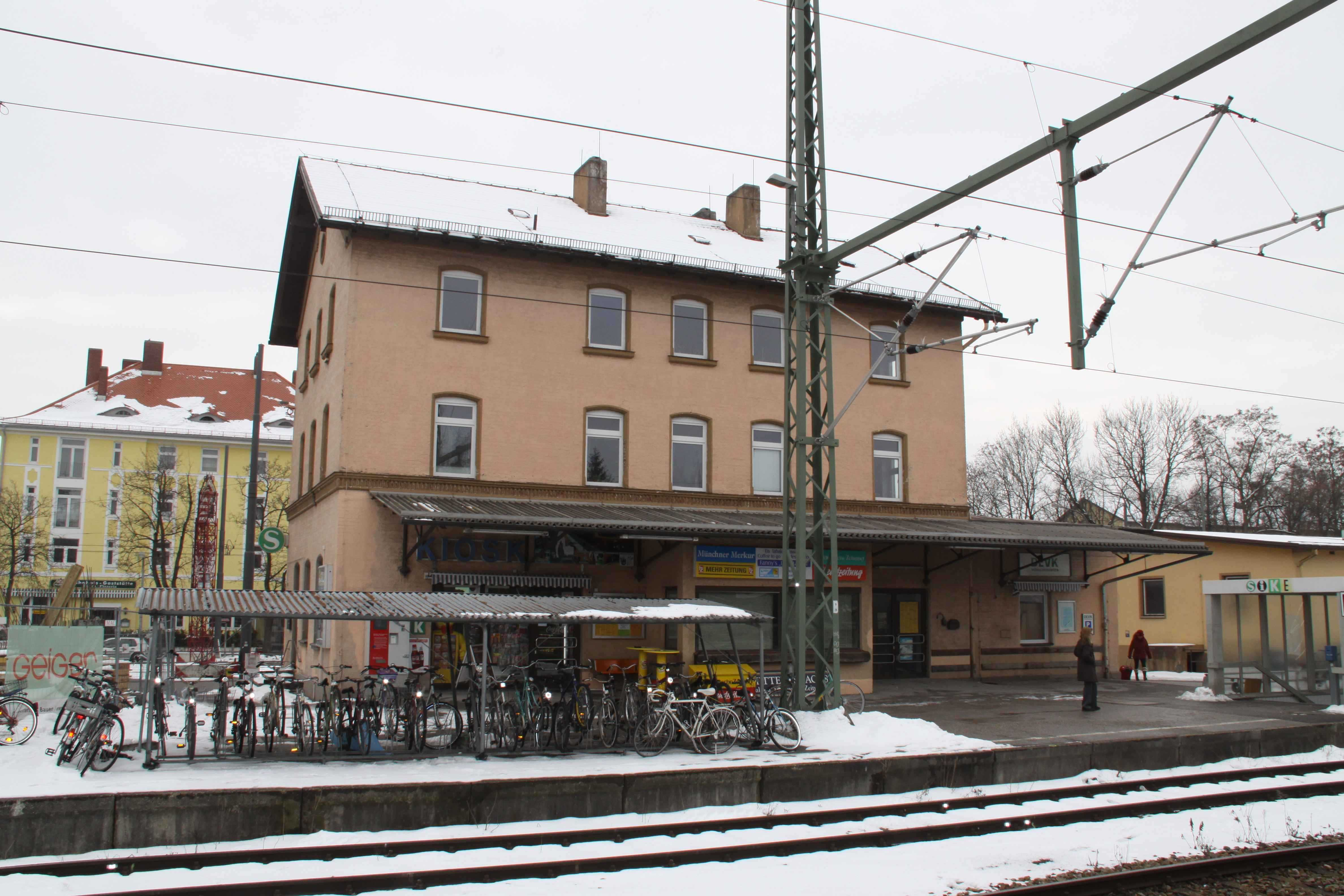
- Moosach S-Bahn station

General information
- Location: Bunzlauer Str. 1 Moosach, Munich, Bavaria; Germany
- Coordinates: 48°10′49″N 11°30′26″E
- Lines: Munich–Regensburg (KBS 930); Connecting line to the Munich North Ring
- Platforms: 3 S-Bahn
- Connections: 162, 163, 169, 176, 710, X35, X80

Construction
- Accessible: Yes: 2 U-Bahn

Other information
- Station code: 4262
- DS100 code: MMCH
- IBNR: 8004155
- Category: 5
- Fare zone: : M and 1
- Website: www.bahnhof.de; stationsdatenbank.de

History
- Opened: S-Bahn: 1892; U-Bahn: 11 December 2010

Services
Preceding station	DB Regio Bayern	Following station
München Hbf Terminus	RE 2 Limited service	Feldmoching towards Hof Hbf
München Hbf One-way operation	RE 3 Limited service	Freising towards Passau Hbf
München Hbf Terminus	RB 33	Feldmoching towards Landshut Hbf
Preceding station	Munich S-Bahn	Following station
Laim towards Leuchtenbergring	S1	Fasanerie towards Freising or Flughafen
Preceding station	Munich U-Bahn	Following station
Terminus	U3	Moosacher St.-Martins-Platz towards Fürstenried West
Location

Munich-Moosach station is a railway station in the Moosach district of Munich, the capital of the German state of Bavaria. It consists of an above-ground station for regional and Munich S-Bahn services and an underground station for the Munich U-Bahn.

== S-Bahn station ==
Moosach station is located on the Munich–Regensburg railway. A single track branch connects to the Munich North Ring, which leads to the Munich North marshalling yard.

On 3 November 1858, the Royal Bavarian Eastern Railway Company opened the line between Munich and Landshut. A year later, the line was extended to Regensburg. No train station was built in the then independent municipality of Moosach. On 28 September 1892, the line, which previously ran along the route of Landshuter Allee, was relocated to run to the east of the Nymphenburg Park through Moosach and south to München-Laim. The line was built as double-track and a new station was established in Moosach. After the incorporation of Moosach in Munich in 1913, Moosach station was renamed as Munich-Moosach. On 28 September 1925, Munich-Moosach station was electrified with the line from Munich to Freising. From 10 May 1927, electric locomotives could run on the entire line to Regensburg. In 1944, the station was served by 31 local trains from Munich to Freising, Landshut and Regensburg each day. By 1972, the station facilities were rebuilt for operations of the S-Bahn, including, inter alia, the raising of platforms to a height of 76 centimetres. Since 1970, the operation of the trackwork has been controlled by a Siemens class 60 (SP Dr S60) track plan push button interlocking. Since the opening of the S-Bahn network in 1972, the station has been served at 20-minute intervals by the S-Bahn line S 1; local services also continue to stop at the station in the peak hour.

There are three platform tracks at Moosach station. Track 5 is used by line S 1 of the Munich S-Bahn and some Regionalbahn services towards Munich. Track 4 is used by the S 1 services to Freising/the Airport and Regionalbahn services towards Freising and beyond. Regional-Express and Alex trains pass through the station without stopping. Platform 3 serves as an alternative platform when required. Track 1 and 2 do not have platforms and are used by freight trains to connect with the North Ring. The platform on tracks 3 and 4 is 350 metres long and 76 cm high, and the platform on track 5 is 400 metres long and is 76 cm high.

== U-Bahn station ==
Construction of the U-Bahn line from Olympia-Einkaufszentrum to Moosach station commenced on 7 October 2004. The U-Bahn station was built with a station box excavated from the surface using diaphragm walls and a tunnel built with a tunnelling shield. The station has no pillars and is illuminated by natural light through skylights and by individual lights on the ceiling. It was opened on 11 December 2010 and currently forms the terminus of line.

The walls at the back of the track are made of white panels on which large-scale images of different plants and animals are attached. This artistic design was produced by the Munich-based artist Martin Fengel who has included all the motifs of Moosach. The height of the platform walls is 7.80 metres.

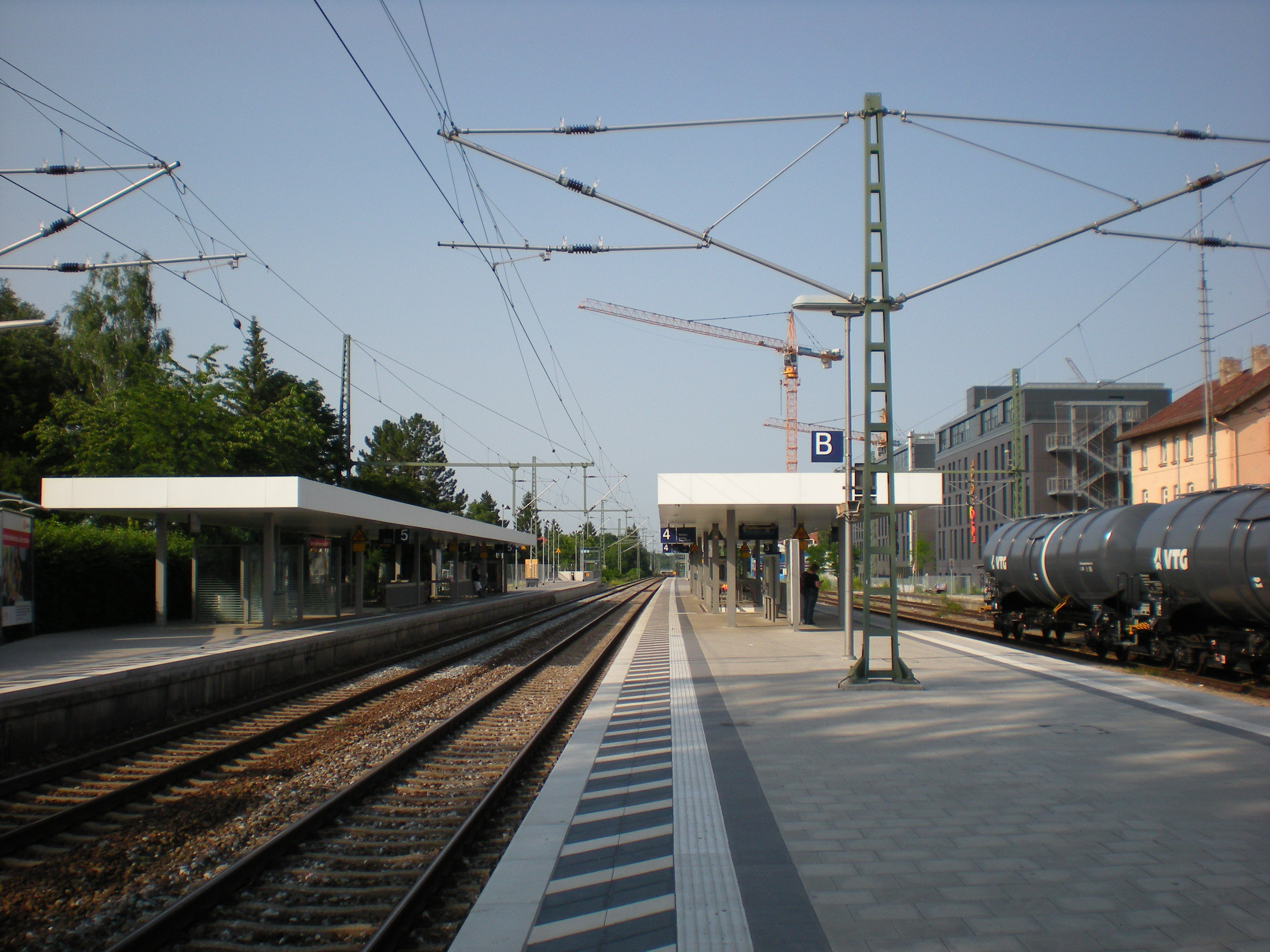
Platforms of Moosach S-Bahn station

View from the platform

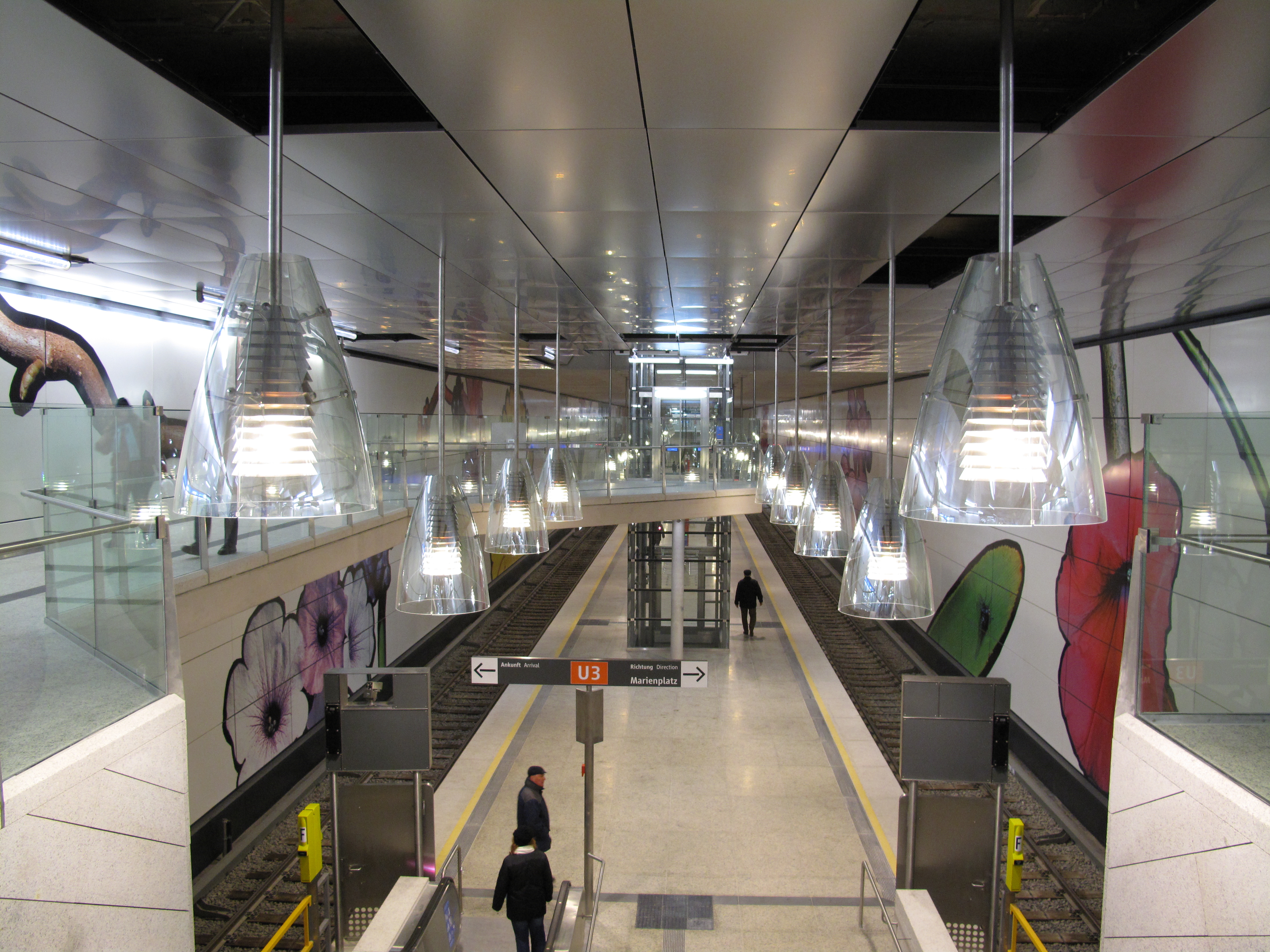
Platforms

U-Bahn train

== Trams and buses ==
Moosach Station is the terminus of tram lines and. On both sides of the station there are stops for several bus routes, including Metrobus route 51.
