= Neufahrn bei Freising station =

Munich S-Bahn station

Neufahrn (b Freising)
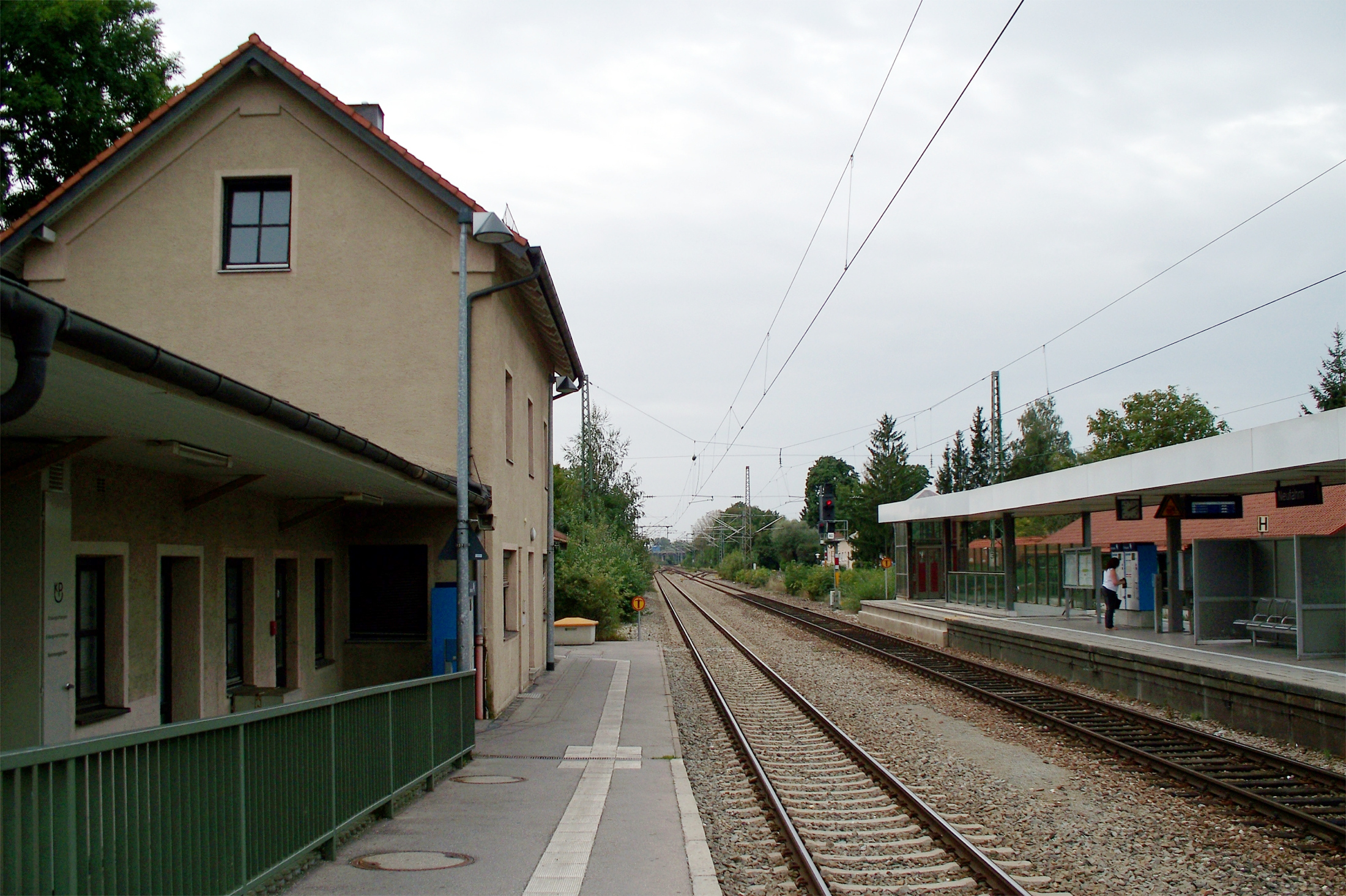
- 2008

General information
- Location: Neufahrn bei Freising, Bavaria; Germany
- Coordinates: 48°19′17″N 11°39′40″E
- Owner: Deutsche Bahn
- Operator: DB Netz; DB Station&Service
- Lines: Munich–Regensburg (KBS 930); Neufahrn Link to the Airport
- Platforms: 1 island platform 1 side platform
- Tracks: 3
- Train operators: S-Bahn München
- Connections: 690, 691, 692, 694

Construction
- Accessible: Yes

Other information
- Station code: 4389
- DS100 code: MNF
- IBNR: 8004279
- Category: 4
- Fare zone: : 3
- Website: stationsdatenbank.de; www.bahnhof.de

History
- Opened: 1880

Services
Preceding station	Munich S-Bahn	Following station
Eching towards Leuchtenbergring	S1	Pulling towards Freising
Eching towards Leuchtenbergring	S1	Munich Airport Besucherpark towards Flughafen
Location

Neufahrn (bei Freising) station is located in the town of Neufahrn bei Freising in the German state of Bavaria and is served by the Munich S-Bahn.

The station is on the Munich–Regensburg railway and is served by Munich S-Bahn line S1. North of the station, a link to the airport branches off; this was opened in 1998 as an alternative to S8. So line S1 services are coupled or uncoupled at Neufahrn station. Usually the rear section of the train goes to Munich Airport Terminal station and the front section goes to Freising station. The station has a side platform as platform 1 and a central platform between platform tracks 2 and 3. Trains are uncoupled to run towards Freising and the Airport on platform 1. Trains running towards Munich East station are coupled mainly on track 3, although some are coupled on track 2. The side platform is designed as the “home” platform (next to the station building), which can be reached by ramps from both ends of the station from Bahnhofstraße (station street) or from a footpath. The central platform is accessible through underpasses at both ends, with the underpass located at the western end having ramps to the station forecourt (Bahnhofsplatz) and to Massenhauser Straße and a lift to the platform. Bahnhofstrasse also has P & R parking. A connection to the airport with a flyover was built north of the station. The previously unused home platform was also rebuilt and installed with new points, which are designed for 100 km/h. The home platform is 210 metres long and 96 cm high. The platform for tracks 2 and 3 is 210 metres long, but only 76 cm high.

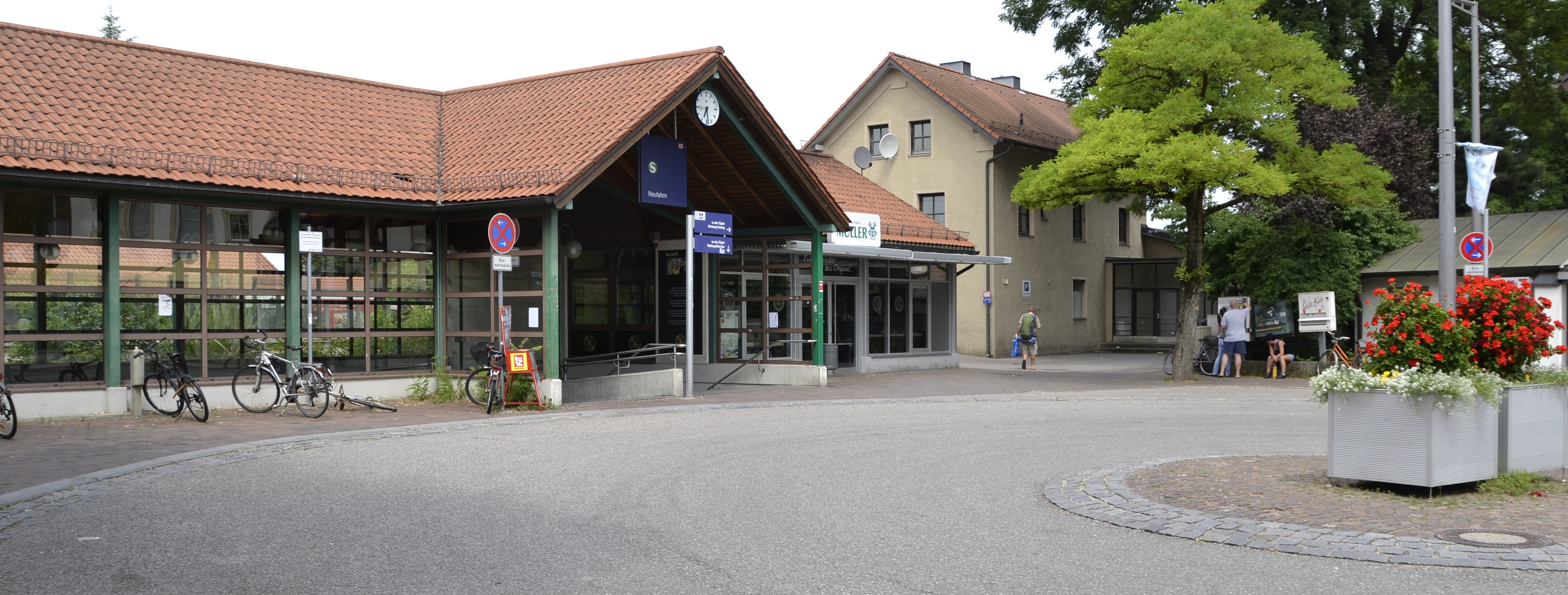
Station building in 2013.
