= Unterschleißheim =

- Town
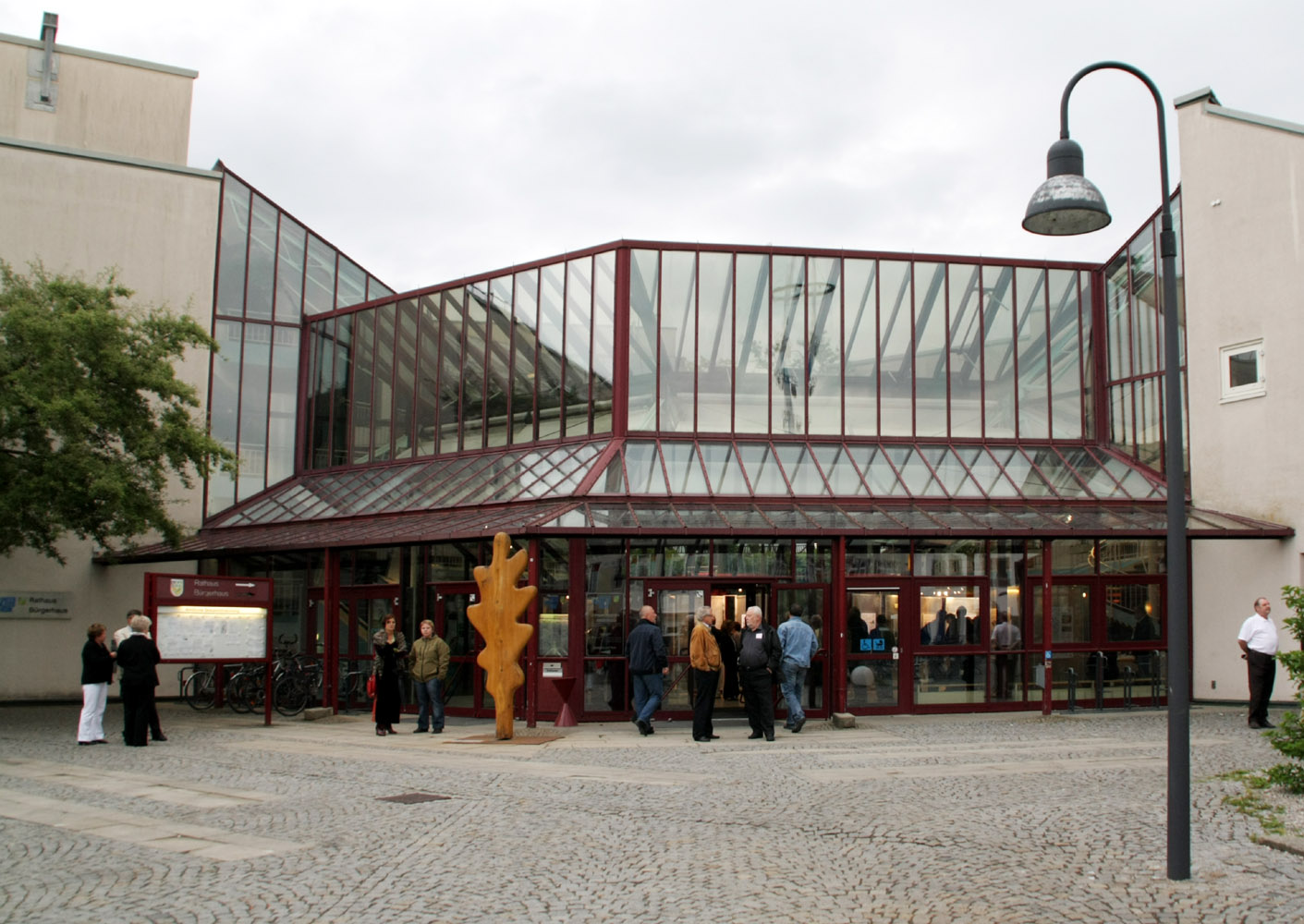
- Town hall

- Coat of arms

- Location of Unterschleißheim within Munich district
- Interactive map of Unterschleißheim
- Location within Germany Location within Bavaria
- Coordinates: 48°17′N 11°34′E
- Country: Germany
- State: Bavaria
- Admin. region: Oberbayern
- District: Munich

Government
  - Mayor (2020–26): Christoph Böck (SPD)

Area
  - Total: 14.93 km^{2} (5.76 sq mi)
- Elevation: 473 m (1,552 ft)

Population (2025-12-31)
  - Total: 28,193
  - Density: 1,888/km^{2} (4,891/sq mi)
- Time zone: UTC+01:00 (CET)
  - Summer (DST): UTC+02:00 (CEST)
- Postal codes: 85716
- Dialling codes: 089
- Vehicle registration: M
- Website: www.unterschleissheim.de

Unterschleißheim (German pronunciation: [ʊntɐˈʃlaɪsˌhaɪm], lit. 'Lower Schleißheim', in contrast to "Upper Schleißheim"; Central Bavarian: Untaschleißheim) is a town in Bavaria, Germany. It is located about 17 km north of Munich central, and has a resident population of 29,464 (December 31, 2021).

== History ==
Originally, the area was called Schleissheim ("Sleizheim") for centuries. Not until the 19th Century was it divided into (upper) Oberschleissheim and (lower) Unterschleissheim for population and political reasons. The small hamlet of Mittenheim lay between the two communities.

There is evidence that the area was inhabited as far back as the Bronze Age. Remnants of a road marker and a Villa Rustica were found from the Roman Era.

The first surviving document in which Schleißheim is mentioned comes from the year 785 AD in which Rihpalt von Slivesheim donated his estate to the diocese of Freising. The hamlet “Schleyßaim” was already a village as early as the 12th century.

The small church of St. Martin in Mallertshofen, (a Romanesque church) was built in the Schleissheim area in the first half of the 13th century.

The catholic church building of St. Ulrich was first built in 1518.

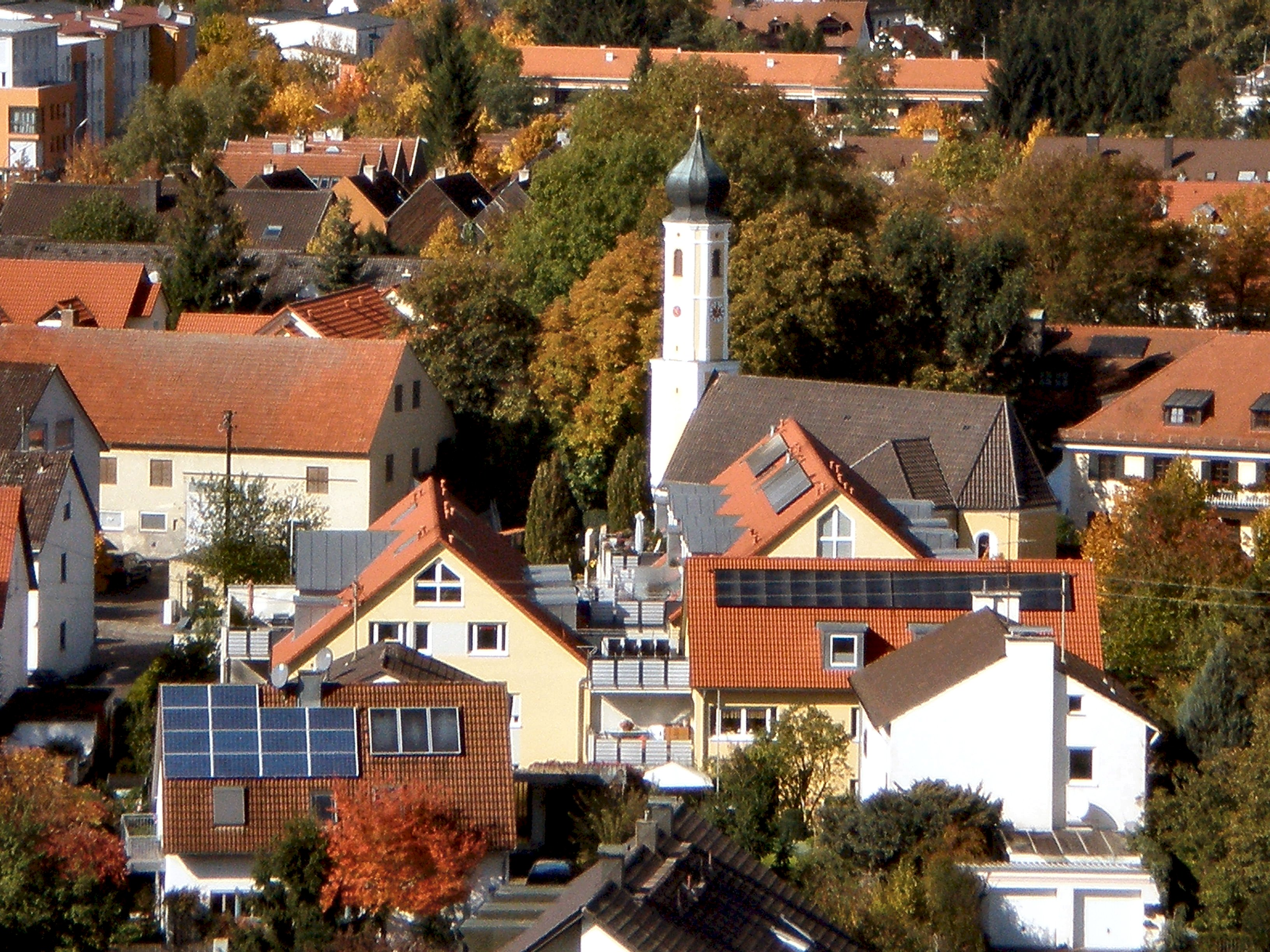
Catholic church St. Ulrich in Unterschleissheim

The community suffered heavy losses during the Thirty Years' War (1618–48).

The Palace Complex in Schleissheim was built over a period of 130 years, (from the 1590s by the Dukes of Bavaria, to the 1720s by the Electors of Bavaria). The palace was mostly used as a summer residence for the Bavarian rulers of the House of Wittelsbach.

As part of the administrative reforms in Bavaria in 1818, Unterschleissheim became an independent political community, (thus separated from the community of Oberschleissheim with its Palace Complex).

From 1856 to 1858 the first railway line from Munich to Landshut passed through Unterschleissheim, with a station in the nearby village of Lohhof.

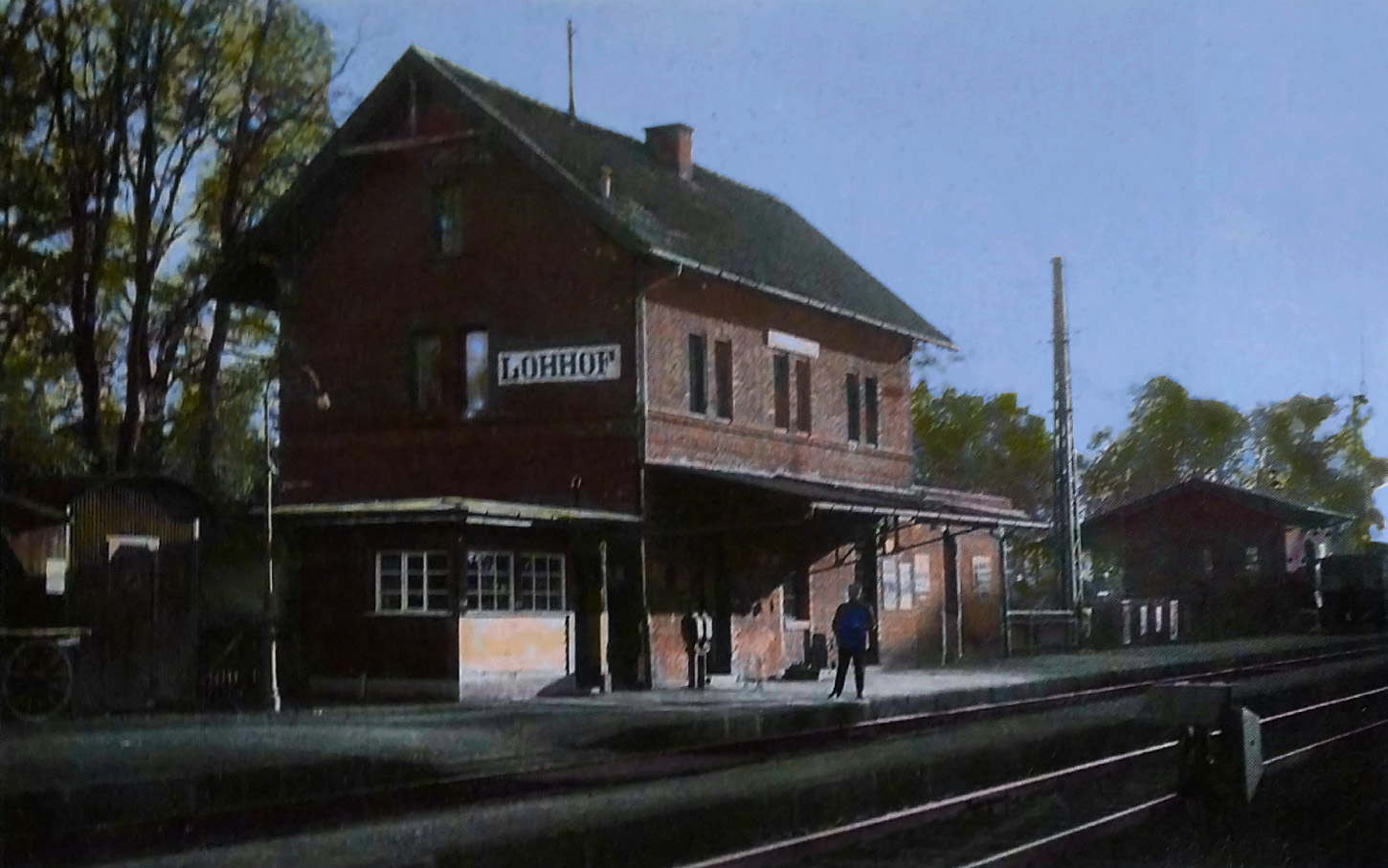
Original train station in Lohhof, part of Unterschleissheim. Station was built in 1858. Photo taken c. 1930 (digitally colorized).

During the late 19th century, the area between Unterschleissheim and Dachau was considered a 'Painter's Paradise' for nature artists. Painters and illustrators such as Otto Hupp, Frank Behrens, Max Hein-Neufeld and Heinz Katzenberger should be mentioned.

During the Nazi Era, a forced labor facility was built in Lohhof to grow and process flax for the textile industry. About 300 women were forced to work here until the facility was destroyed by the Americans during the Liberation of Dachau and Munich in 1945.

After 1945, the community's population grew dramatically. Many apartment buildings and industries have been developed since then. The city was given an official coat of arms in 1965.

In 1979 and 1980, the Autobahn (A92) was constructed just west of Unterschleissheim.

== City symbol ==
Unterschleißheim's coat of arms symbolises the city's past and present. The shield of the coat of arms is divided. The upper part shows a golden zigzag line on a blue background. The lower part incorporates a green branch of a spruce and a green oak leaf on a golden background.

== Industry ==
Unterschleissheim is home to several large industries such as Baxter International, Linde Gas AG, Baader Bank AG, EDAG Engineering GmbH, Orterer Gruppe and Keller & Kalmbach. It was also the former home to Microsoft Germany from the 1980s until it moved to Munich in 2016. The European aerospace conglomerate EADS also had facilities in Unterschleissheim before they closed in 2013.

== Recreation ==
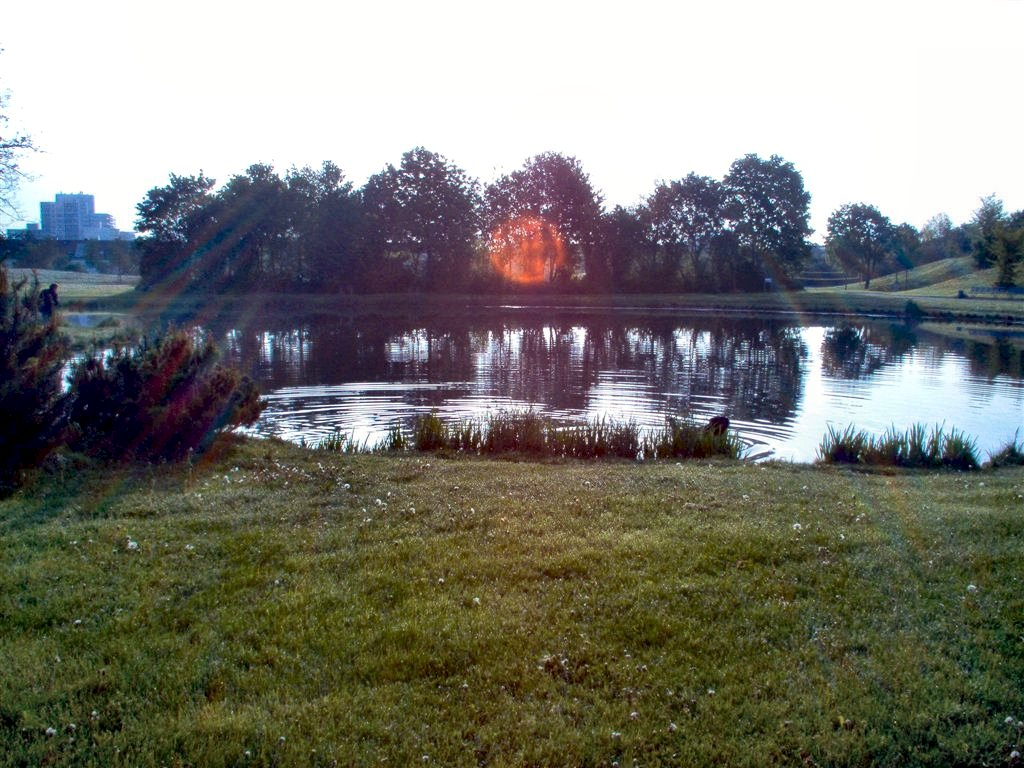
Unterschleißheim, Rolf-Zeitler-Park

Lake Unterschleißheim was created from 1979–1980 by extracting fill to build the Autobahn (A92). Over the past 3 decades it has become an almost natural lake, with an ecologically balanced zone, a conservation area for seabirds during the nesting season, and a damp biotop covering 26 acres (110,000 m^{2}) of land, of which roughly 18 acres (73,000 m^{2}) is used for sunbathing. With numerous shallow areas this is a popular summer gathering area for families with children, and used frequently for ice skating and curling in the winter.

The “Valentinspark”, covering roughly 30 acres (120,000 m^{2}) which was made possible at the instigation of former mayor Rolf Zeitler and opened on July 22, 2000, was rededicated on January 12, 2024 as “Rudolf-Zeitler-Park”, in memory of him and his achievements.

== Transport ==
Unterschleissheim is nestled between two major roads and an autobahn, forming a rough triangular border formation: the Autobahn (A92) to the west, the Federal Road (B13) to the east and the Federal Road (B471) to the south. The Autobahn (A92) gives direct access to the Munich Airport Franz Josef Strauß. Two S-Bahn stations on the Munich–Regensburg line, served by S1 trains, connect Unterschleißheim with the regional rail system.

A bridge crosses over the S-Bahn line in the middle of Unterschleißheim, called the Le Cres Brücke (named in honor of their sister city in France).

== Twin towns – sister cities ==
Unterschleißheim is twinned with:

- Le Crès, France
- Zengőalja (microregion), Hungary
