= Baader Bank AG =

German investment bank

- Type: Aktiengesellschaft
- Traded as: FWB: BWB
- ISIN: DE0005088108
- Industry: Investment banking
- Founded: July 1, 1983; 43 years ago
- Founder: Uto Baader
- Headquarters: Unterschleißheim, Germany
- Key people: Oliver Riedel (Board of Directors Chairman); Kai Göhring; Martin Zoller; Louis Hagen (Supervisory Board Chairman); Georg Heni (Supervisory Board Deputy Chairman)
- Total assets: €3.235 billion
- Number of employees: 677 (across the group) (2025)
- Website: baaderbank.de

Baader Bank AG is a German investment bank based in Unterschleißheim near Munich and is active in the trading of financial instruments. As a market maker with a full banking license, it is responsible for the pricing of over 800,000 securities, provides trading, account, custody, and ancillary services, and supports medium-sized companies with capital measures and IPOs. The bank is primarily active in Germany, Austria, and Switzerland. As of 2025, the bank had total assets of €3.235 billion and 677 employees across the Group.

Baader Bank AG is a family-owned bank listed on the stock exchange. It is a member of the Association of German Banks and part of its deposit protection scheme. The group's headquarters are located in Unterschleißheim near Munich, additional locations are Frankfurt am Main and Stuttgart.

== History ==
=== History as a stock exchange trading company ===
The starting point for the foundation of Baader Bank was the admission of Uto Baader, the bank's founder, to the stock exchange as a stockbroker in July 1983. He initially managed the order books of three shares, the North American stocks of AT&T Corporation, COMSAT and Westinghouse Electric Corporation. With the issuance support of DB-Soft AG, in 1993, Baader expanded its business activities beyond just order book management towards personal support for customers, which later developed into separate business divisions. The acquisition of the listed Ballmaier & Schultz Wertpapier AG and the merger in 1998 gave rise to Baader Wertpapierhandelsbank AG. Baader Bank was thus admitted to the Frankfurt Stock Exchange.

=== Business expansion ===
At the beginning of the 2000s, Baader Bank increased the frequency with which it purchased order books, further expanding order book management in German equities. It integrated the Stuttgart-based brokerage firm KST in 2000, Eckes Effektenhandel AG (Frankfurt) in 2001, and German Brokers (Frankfurt) in 2002. Baader also acquired a stake in Heins & Seitz Capital Management GmbH (Munich) at the end of 2002. In 2003, the order books of Gebhard & Schuster (Munich), the Frankfurt brokers Bargmann, Pfeiffer und Elsässer and the Düsseldorf brokerage house Spütz Börsenservice GmbH were added. With the acquisition of Eckes, Baader Bank entered the institutional brokerage business. The acquisition of Spütz meant an expansion of order book management for derivative products. Deutsche Börsenmakler GmbH was acquired at the beginning of 2008. With this step, the company expanded its activities in traded securities classes to include exchange-traded funds. Between 1998 and 2008, the bank acquired around 20 companies, making it the market leader with a market share of 31% in Frankfurt floor trading.

=== Conversion to a full bank ===
On 31 July 2008, Baader Wertpapierhandelsbank AG became the full-service bank Baader Bank AG. In October, the bank joined the Association of German Banks, and at the same time, became a member of its Deposit Protection Fund. With the launch of the Xetra model on the Frankfurt Stock Exchange on 23 May 2011, Baader Bank acquired the 120 order books of the lead broker companies Bid & Ask Financial Services mbH (Nuremberg), Hordoff GmbH (Frankfurt) and Mercurius Handelsbank GmbH (Frankfurt). In August 2013, Baader Bank acquired the Swiss equity broker Helvea with offices in Geneva, Zürich, London, Montreal, and New York City.

=== Restructuring and further development ===
In July 2015, founder and owner Uto Baader handed over management of Baader Bank to his son Nico Baader. After the bank registered losses, the following years saw restructuring and the consolidation of the group's structure through the disposal of strategically irrelevant units.

Baader Bank began its expansion as a customer bank in 2018. Based on 25,000 securities accounts, a balance sheet of €700 million, and equity of €76 million, the number of securities accounts quadrupled within two years. At the end of 2021, there were just over half a million securities accounts. One year later, the number rose by 70% to 843,000, with the custody account volume reaching €15.7 billion. In June 2023, one million custody accounts were managed for the first time.

== See also ==
- List of banks in Germany
