= Freising station =

Railway station in Germany

Freising
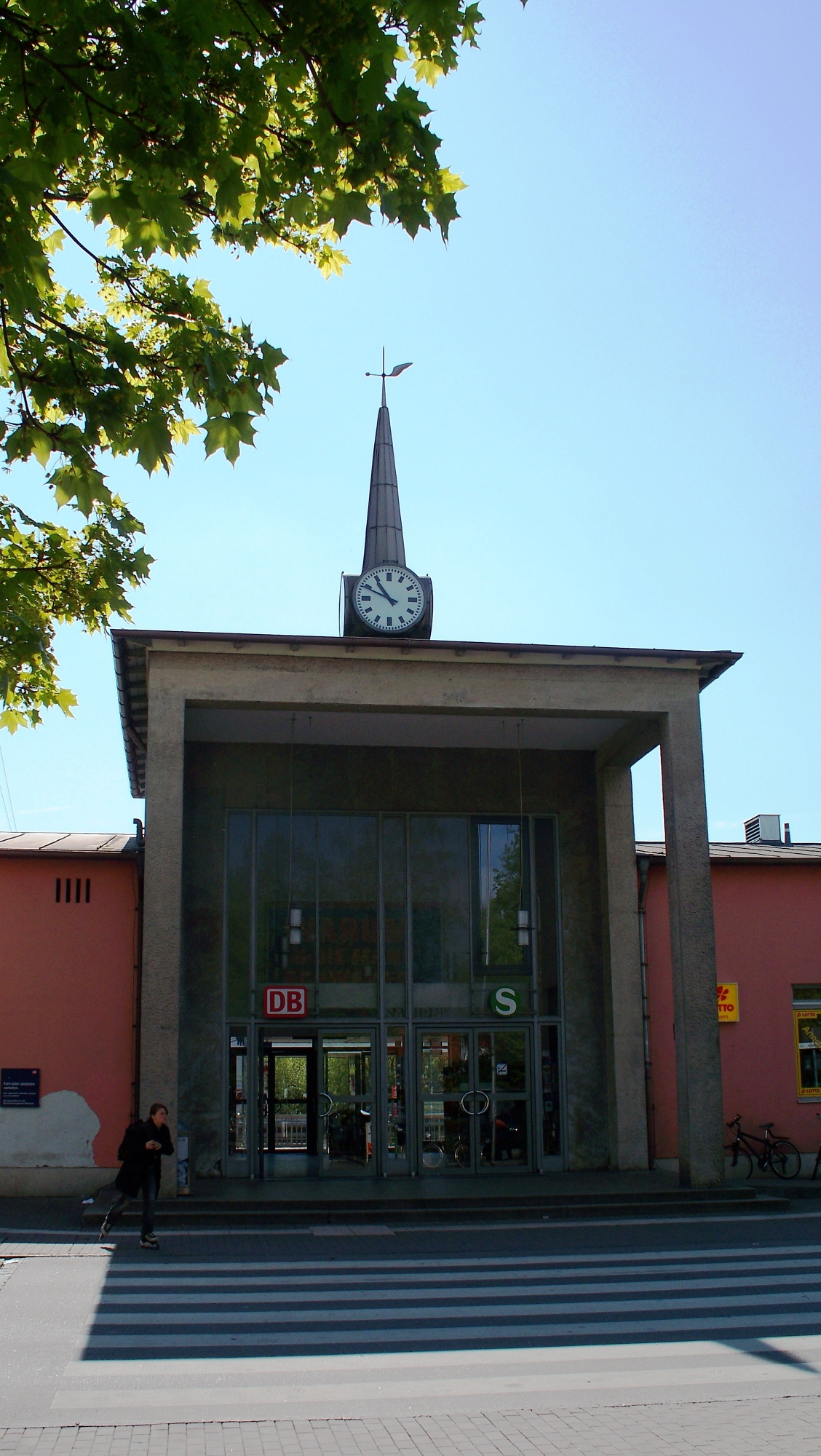
- Station entrance

General information
- Location: Bahnhofsplatz 4, Freising, Bavaria; Germany
- Coordinates: 48°23′43″N 11°44′39″E
- Owner: Deutsche Bahn
- Operator: DB Netz; DB Station&Service
- Lines: Munich–Regensburg (KBS 930)
- Platforms: 4
- Train operators: DB Regio Bayern; Die Länderbahn; S-Bahn München
- Connections: 511, 512V, 601, 602, 603, 614, 615, 616, 617, 618, 619, 620, 621, 622, 623, 624, 630, 631, 633, 634, 635, 637, 638, 639, 640, 641, 650, 651, 691, 6001, 6002, 6003, 6004, 6030, X660

Construction
- Accessible: Yes

Other information
- Station code: 1908
- DS100 code: MFR
- IBNR: 8002078
- Category: 3
- Fare zone: : 4 and 5
- Website: stationsdatenbank.de; www.bahnhof.de

History
- Opened: 3 November 1858; 167 years ago
- Electrified: 3 October 1925; 100 years ago

Services
Preceding station		Following station
München Hbf Terminus	RE 23	Landshut (Bayern) Hbf towards Hof Hbf
München Hbf Terminus	RE 25	Landshut (Bayern) Hbf towards Praha hl.n.
Preceding station	DB Regio Bayern	Following station
München Hbf Terminus	RE 2	Moosburg towards Hof Hbf
München Hbf Terminus	RE 3	Moosburg towards Passau Hbf
München Hbf Terminus	RE 50	Moosburg towards Nürnberg Hbf
Unterschleißheim towards München Hbf	RB 33	Marzling towards Landshut Hbf
Preceding station	Agilis / DB Regio Bayern	Following station
Moosburg towards Nürnberg Hbf	RE 22	Munich Airport Terminus
Preceding station	Munich S-Bahn	Following station
Pulling towards Munich Leuchtenbergring	S1	Terminus
Location
- Location within Bavaria Location within Germany Location within Europe

Freising station is located in the town of Freising in the German state of Bavaria. It is located a few hundred metres to the south of the Domberg ("cathedral hill") on the southern edge of the old town.

== History ==
The station was opened in 1858 during the construction of the line from Munich to Landshut. In 1859 this was extended to Regensburg. The line to Landshut was duplicated in 1891/92.

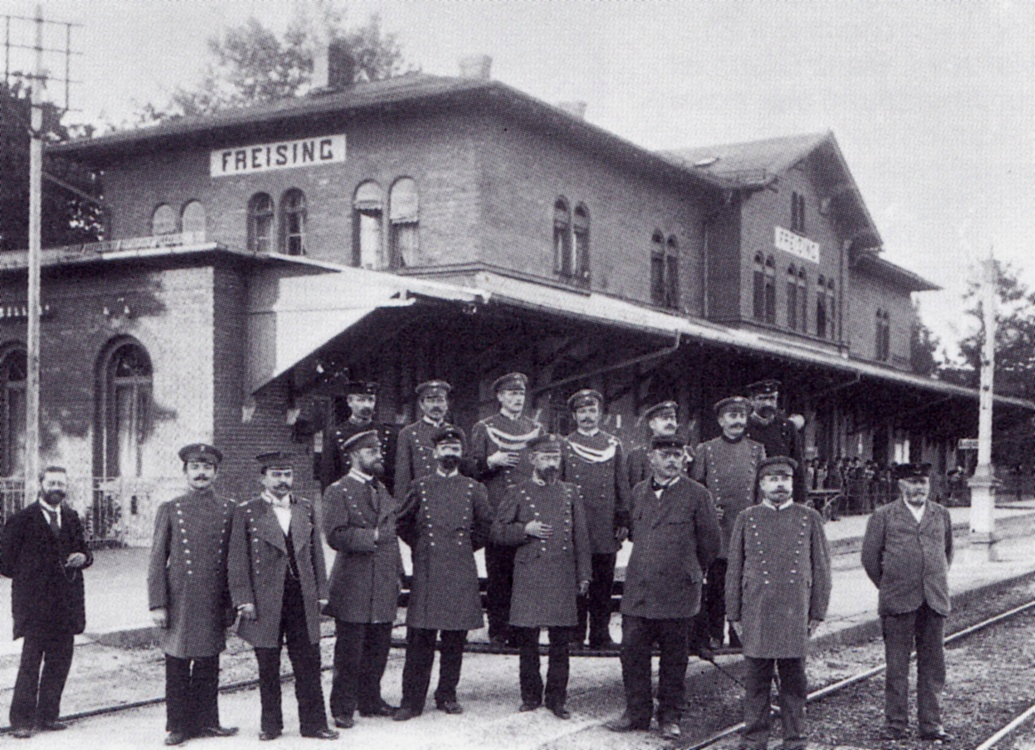
Freising Train Station with railway staff, ca. 1900

The section from Munich to Freising was electrified in 1925; this was completed to Regensburg in 1927. The station was the target of an air raid shortly before the end of the Second World War, on 18 April 1945. 224 people died at the station and in the surrounding area and the station was destroyed. The new station was opened in 1953. Since 1972, Freising has been served by the Munich S-Bahn, which was established in that year. Until 1973, the Hallertau Local Railway (Hallertauer Lokalbahn) operated on the line to Landshut as far as Langenbach, where it branched off towards Hallertau. Since 2006, the trackwork in Freising station has been remotely controlled from Munich.

== Rail services ==
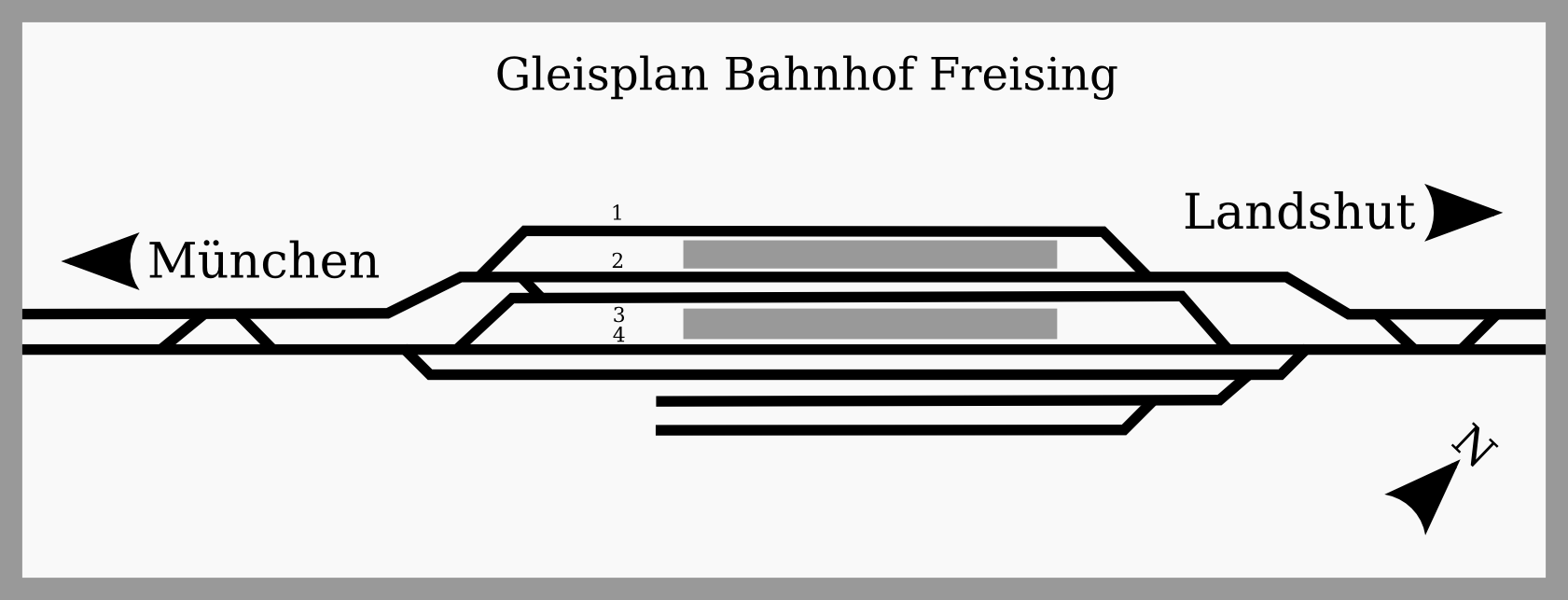
Current track plan

Freising station has four platform tracks next to two central platforms. The platforms are accessible via two tunnels. One connects with the station building and is equipped with lifts and ramps to make it accessible for the disabled. The other tunnel is at the northern end of the platform and has stairs only. Track 1 is served by Regionalbahn services to Landshut, Plattling and Regensburg. The through Regionalbahn services, Regional-Express and ‘’Alex’’ services towards Munich Hauptbahnhof stop on track 2. Track 3 is used by the S1 of the Munich S-Bahn, which connects Freising with the city of Munich at 20 minute intervals (with some 40 minute gaps). Track 4 is served by through trains towards Landshut and Passau or Regensburg and Nuremberg. To the southeast of the platform tracks there is a through track for overtaking and two sidings for the parking of S-Bahn trains overnight. The two sidings can only be reached from the Landshut side of the station, since the connection from the direction of Munich has been broken. Previously, there were other freight tracks, but these are out of operation. Sidings connected to the tractor manufacturers Schlüter and BayWa among others.

Train class	Route	Frequency
RE 2/ RE 25	Munich – Freising – Landshut – Regensburg (– Schwandorf – Weiden – Marktredwitz – Hof / Prague	Every 2 hours
RE 3	Donau-Isar-Express: Munich – Freising – Landshut – Plattling – Passau	Hourly
RE 22	Munich Airport – Freising – Moosburg – Landshut – Regensburg	Hourly
RE 50	Munich – Freising – Landshut – Regensburg – Neumarkt – Nuremberg	Every 2 hours
RB 33	(Munich –) Freising – Langenbach (Oberbay) – Moosburg – Landshut	About every 2 hours, extra peak services
S1	Freising – Neufahrn – Oberschleißheim – Feldmoching – Moosach – Laim – München Hauptbahnhof – Marienplatz – Munich East – Leuchtenbergring	Every 20 mins

== Buses ==
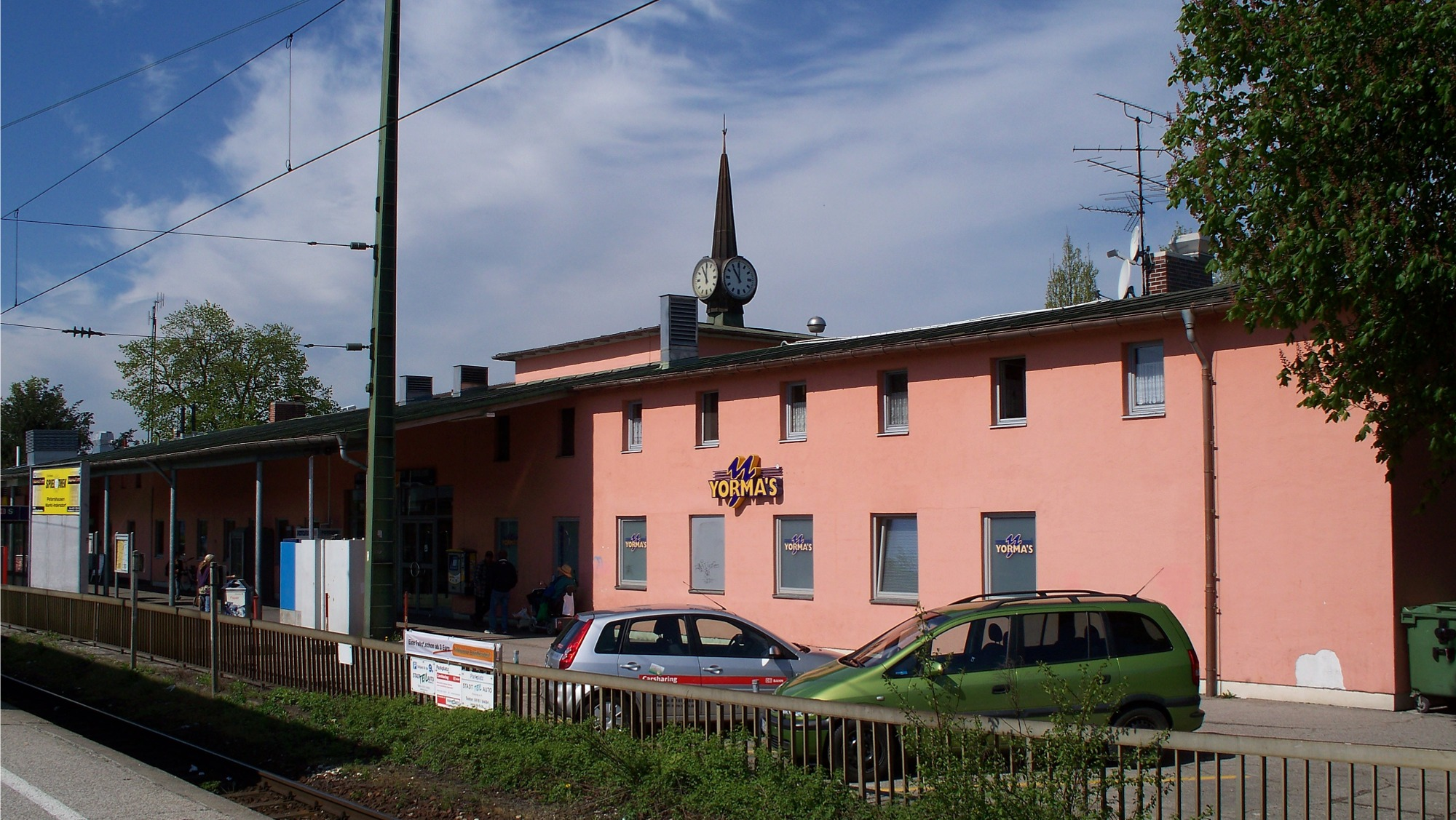
View of the station building from the platform

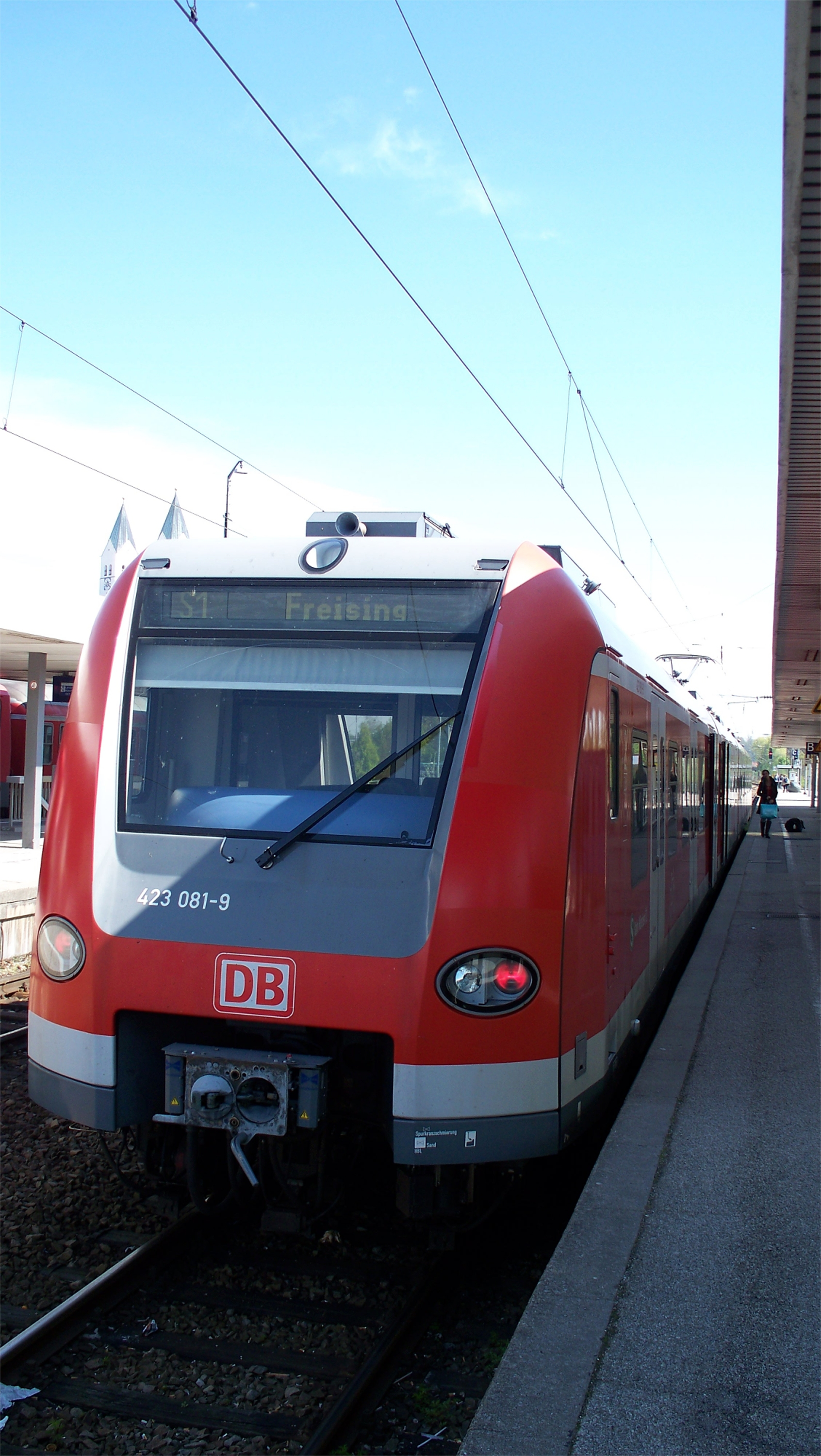
Line S 1 train with Freising Cathedral in the background

The bus station for the Freising city buses is at the northern end of the platform on the side facing the town centre. Almost all routes have their start and end points here. This includes line 635, which connects Freising with Munich Airport. Since the Airport has no rail connection with eastern Bavaria, this can be used to reach the airport from that direction. Buses to Lerchenfeld run from a stop on the southeastern side of the station. South-west of the station building is the bus station for regional services.

== Road ==
Federal highway B 11, one of the main thoroughfares of Freising, runs directly north of the station. The station forecourt is also on this side of the station. This is also a taxi rank. only a few parking spaces are available is on this side of the station.

On the south side of the tracks there is a large park-and-ride car park with almost 1,000 parking spaces. There are nearly 1,600, mostly covered, spaces for bicycles in several places around the station.

== Other ==
The station building has a station bookstore, a Deutsche Bahn travel centre and a branch of Yorma's (fast food). A McDonald's store has been opened in space released as a result of the installation of electronic interlockings on the tracks. The Freising boarding house and a post office are a few metres from the station.
