= Munich–Regensburg railway =

Railway linking Munich and Regensburg

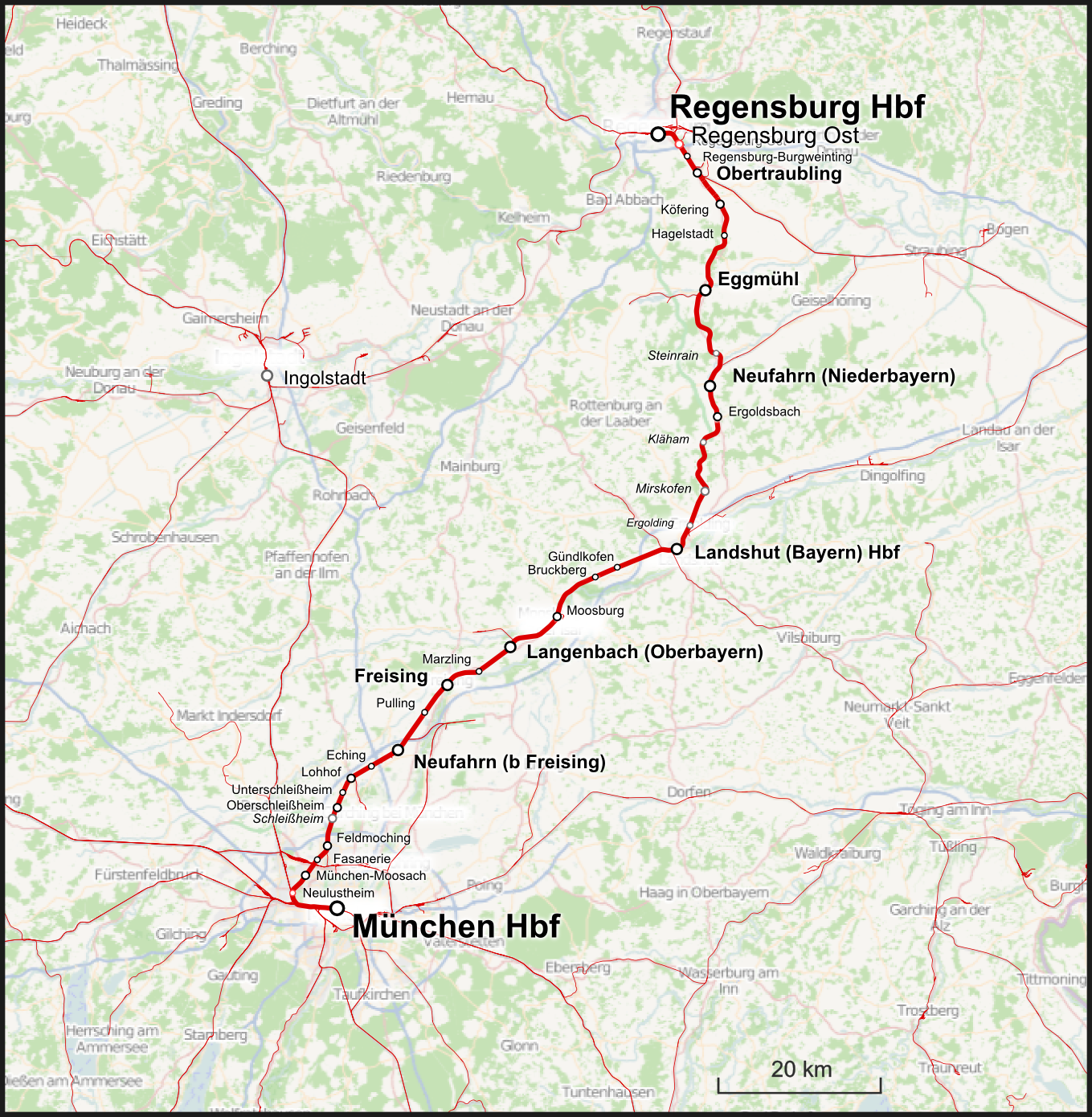

Overview
- Native name: Bahnstrecke München–Regensburg
- Status: Operational
- Owner: Deutsche Bahn
- Line number: 5500
- Locale: Bavaria
- Termini: München Hauptbahnhof; Regensburg Hauptbahnhof
- Stations: 29

Service
- Type: Heavy rail, Passenger/Freight rail Regional rail, Commuter rail
- Route number: 930; 999.1 (S1 München-Freising)
- Operator(s): DB Bahn, alex, Agilis

History
- Opened: Stages between 1859–1873

Technical
- Line length: 138.1 km (85.8 mi)
- Number of tracks: Double track
- Track gauge: 1,435 mm (4 ft 8 1/2 in) standard gauge
- Electrification: 15 kV/16.7 Hz AC Overhead line
- Operating speed: 160 km/h (99 mph)
- Maximum incline: 0.667 %

The Munich–Regensburg railway is a double track, electrified main line railway, linking Munich and Regensburg in the German state of Bavaria, with a total length of 138.1 km. It was opened in 1858 and 1859 and is one of the oldest railways in Germany.

== Route ==
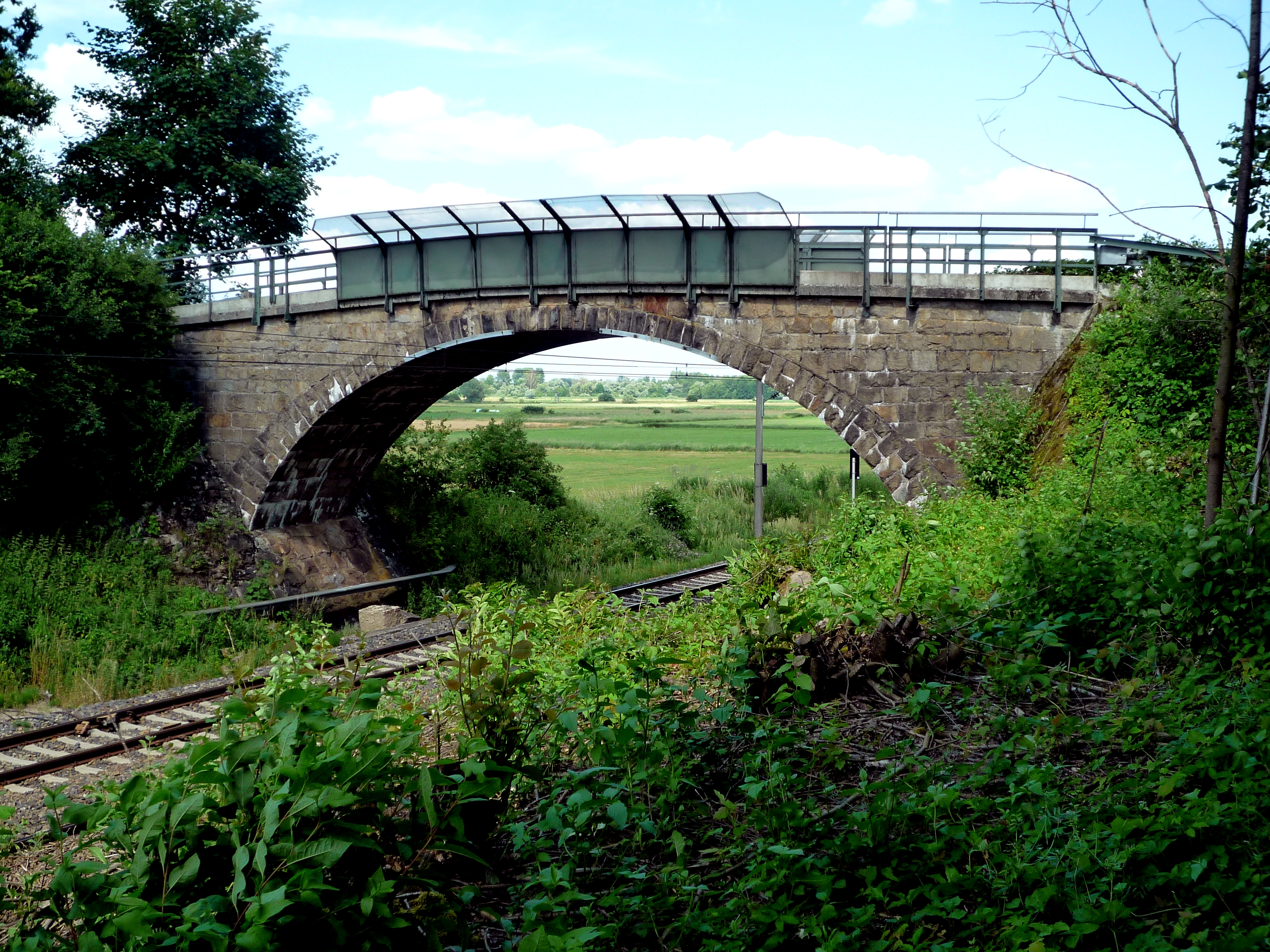
Bridge over the line near Langenbach

The line leaves the Bavarian capital of Munich to the north, running on the left (western) side of the Isar river through the city of Unterschleißheim to Freising, and then curves to the east and runs through Moosburg, where it crosses the Amper river, continuing to Landshut Hauptbahnhof (central station), north of the centre of Landshut, the capital of Lower Bavaria. Here it connects with branch lines from Mühldorf and Plattling and formerly connected with a branch from Rottenburg. It then curves to the north and, after crossing the watershed between the Danube and the Isar at Kläham, slowly descends and ends in the city of Regensburg, the capital of Upper Palatinate.

== History ==
The railway line from Munich to Regensburg was built by the Royal Bavarian Eastern Railway Company (Königlich privilegirte Actiengesellschaft der bayerischen Ostbahnen) founded in 1856 and was opened in two parts: from Munich to Landshut on 3 November 1858 and from Landshut to Regensburg via Geiselhöring on 12 December 1859.

The line formed the trunkline of the Bavarian Eastern Railway together with a section of the Nuremberg–Schwandorf line from Nuremberg to Hersbruck, opened on 9 May 1859, the Hersbruck–Schwandorf–Regensburg section (between Schwandorf and Regensburg this is now considered part of the Regensburg–Weiden line), opened on 12 December 1859, and the Geiselhöring–Straubing section, also opened on 12 December 1859.

In the summer of 1870 construction started on a line from Neufahrn to Eggmühl and Obertraubling, considerably shortening the route between Landshut and Regensburg. This was opened on 6 August 1873. The Geiselhöring–Sünching section was closed as a result.

The duplication of the line was carried out in several sections: from Feldmoching to Lohhof on 3 November 1891, to Freising on 19 November 1891, to Moosburg on 25 November 1891 and to Landshut on 28 September 1892. On the same day, the old single-track line (now the route of Landshuterallee, part of the Munich Middle Ring Road) was replaced by a two track line further west running through Moosach.

=== Electrification ===
The line was electrified on 28 September 1925 from Munich to Freising, on 3 October 1925 to Landshut, on 1 October 1926 to Neufahrn and finally on 10 May 1927 to Regensburg.

=== S-Bahn ===
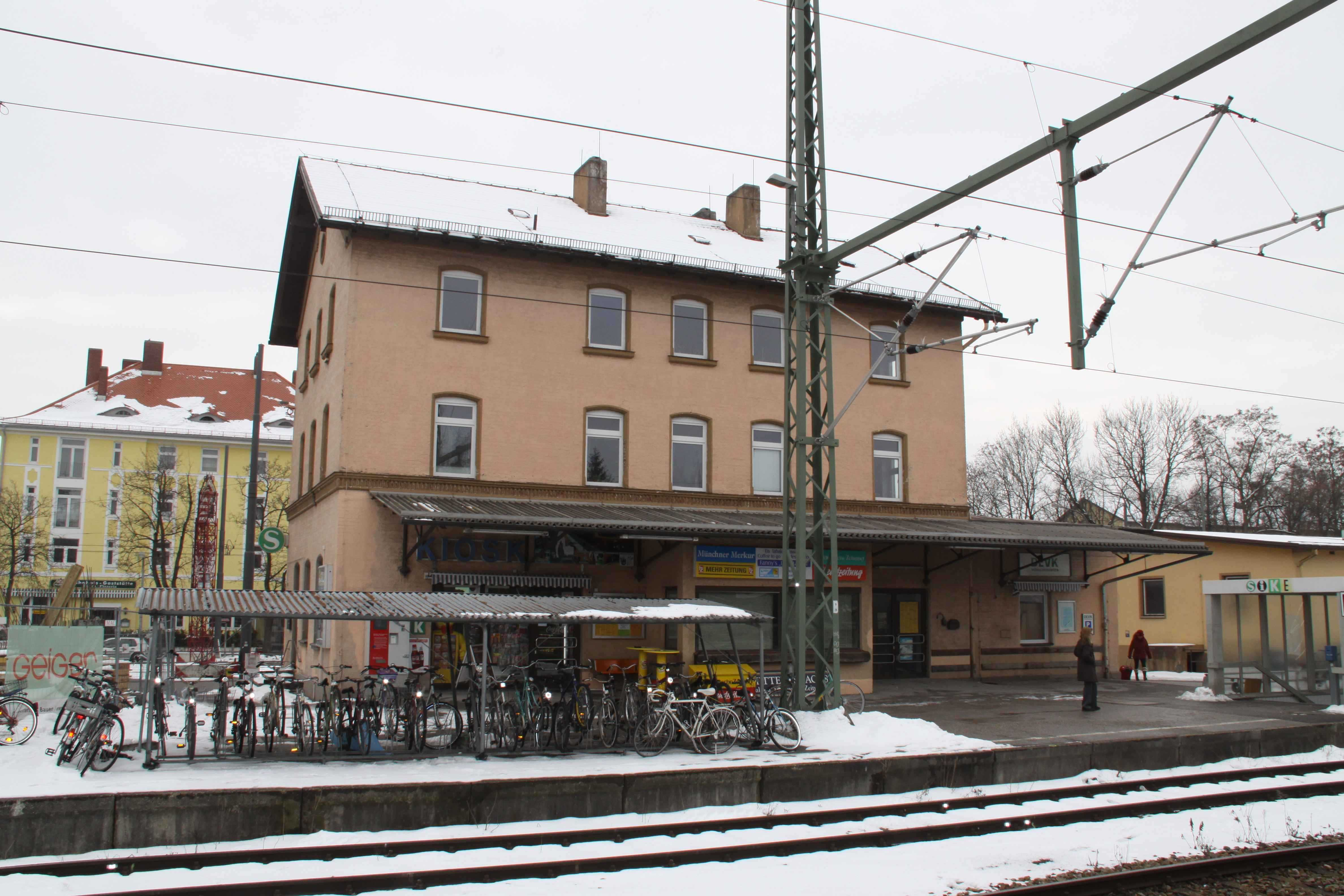
Moosach station

Between 1966 and 1972, the stations of Freising, Neufahrn, Lohhof, Feldmoching and Moosach and the halts of Pulling, Eching and Fasanerie were rebuilt with 76 cm high platforms and the tracks were adapted for the Munich S-Bahn. A new three-track station with reversing facility was built in Oberschleißheim, north of the old Schleißheim station. Finally on 17 December 1977, a halt was added at Unterschleissheim.

During the extension of U-Bahn line 2 to Feldmoching, completed in 1996, Feldmoching station was rebuilt with a 96 cm high middle platform for platform tracks 2 and 3, which was connected with stairs and a lift to the U-Bahn station. The platform on track 1 was closed.

In 1998 the western link to Munich Airport was opened as a two-track line which branches off north of Neufahrn at a flying junction. To increase line capacity, a 96 cm high platform was built at Neufahrn with new crossovers, which trains can run over at 100 km/h.

In December 2006, in Feldmoching platform 1 was rebuilt at a height of 96 cm for the S-Bahn and re-opened.

== Operations ==
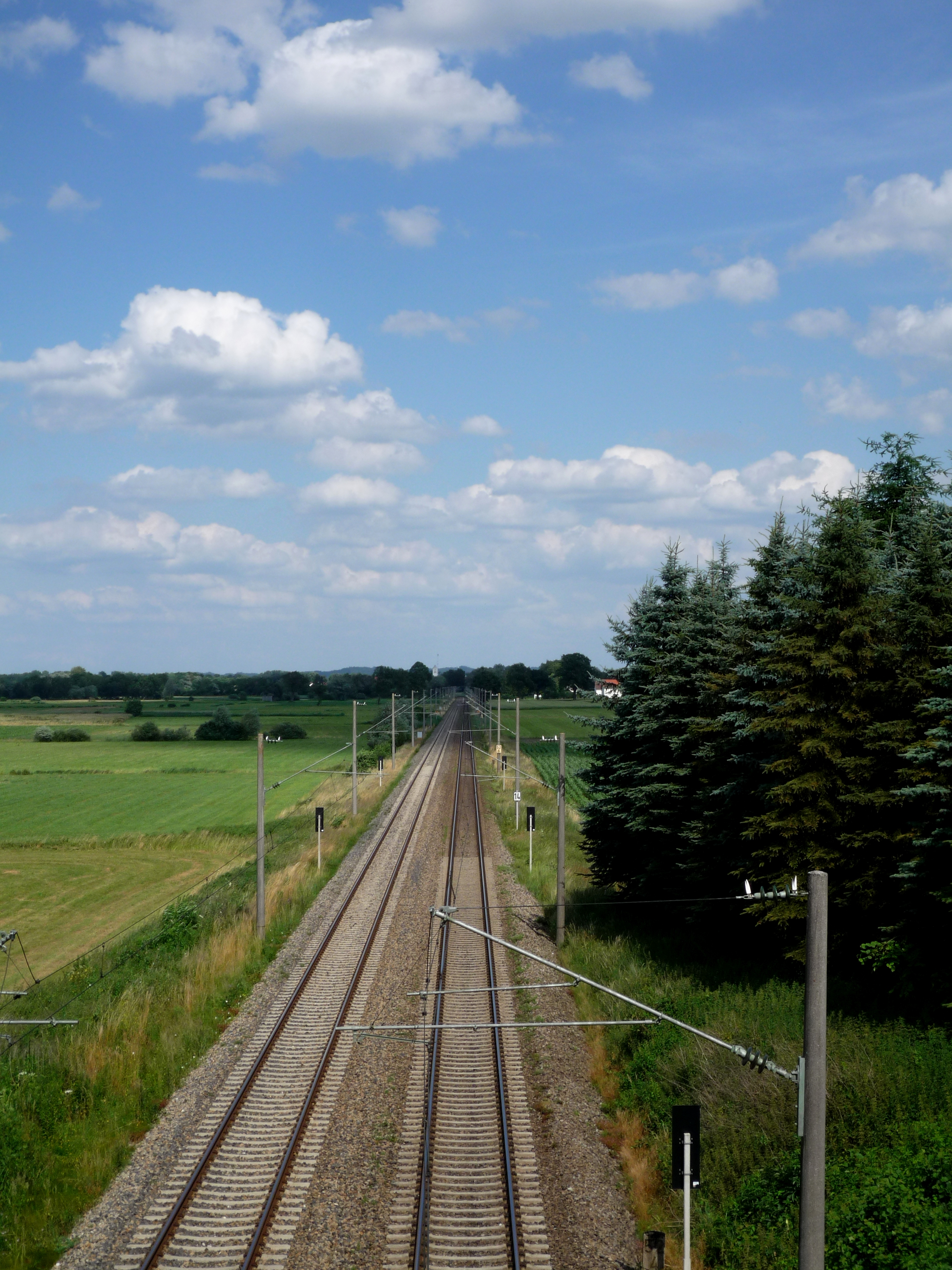
Line between Langenbach and Moosburg

The southern section of the line between Munich and Landshut has dense passenger traffic, including Munich S1 line to Freising and Regionalbahn trains to Landshut, as well as Donau-Isar-Express services to Passau. The northern section has less passenger trains, but more freight trains.

S-Bahn line 1 operates at 20-minute intervals (it operates twice an hour on the Neufahrn–Freising section outside of the weekday peaks) with class 423 multiple units on the Munich Ost–Moosach–Feldmoching–Neufahrn–Munich Airport / Freising route. Usually trains are split at Neufahrn with part of the train running to Freising and the other part to the airport.
