= Munich Airport Terminal station =

Munich S-Bahn station

✈ Flughafen München
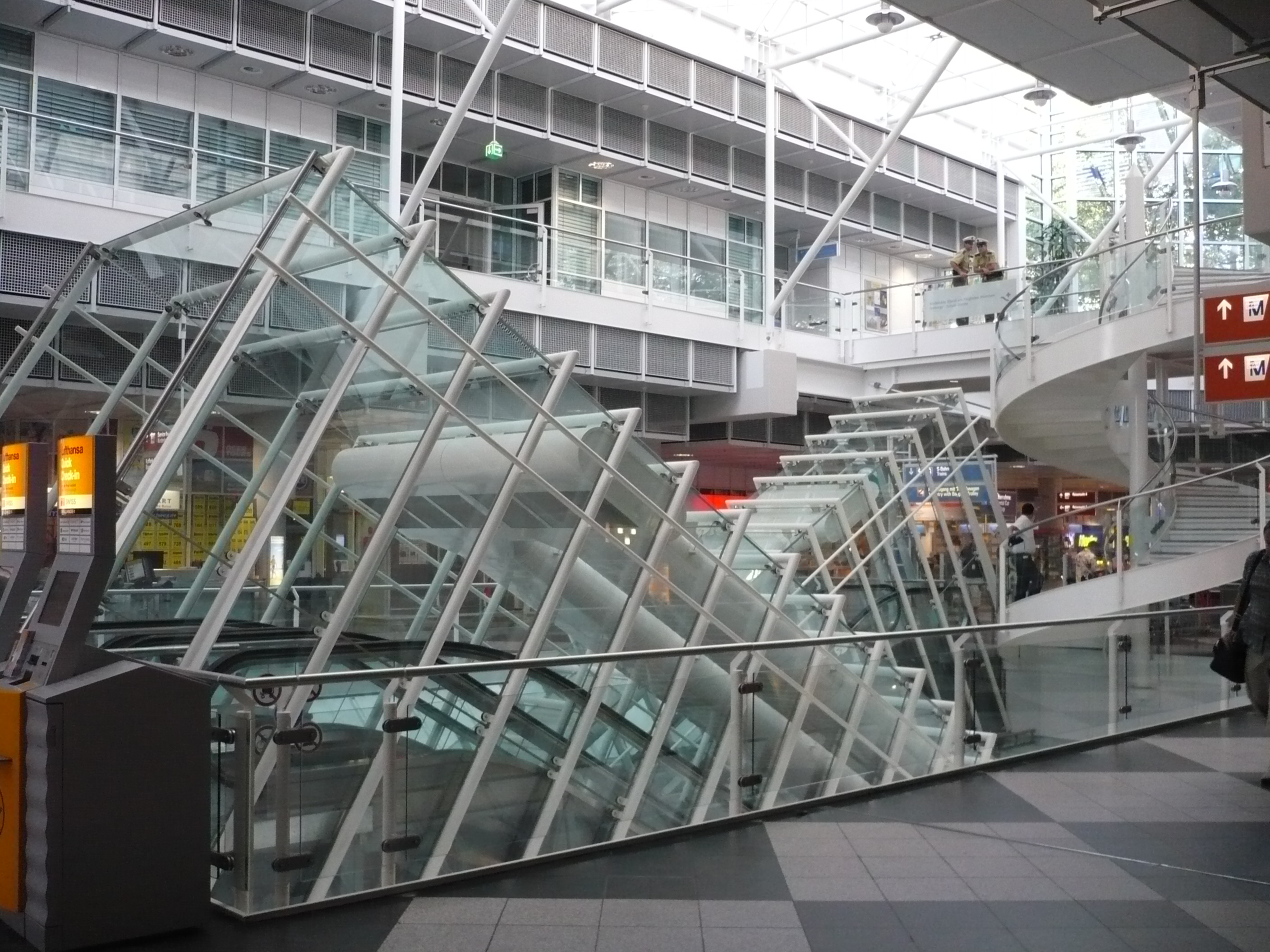
- Escalators at Munich Airport station

General information
- Location: Oberding, Bavaria; Germany
- Coordinates: 48°21′13″N 11°47′09″E
- Owner: Deutsche Bahn
- Operator: DB Netz; DB Station&Service
- Lines: Munich East–Munich Airport (S8) (KBS 999.8); Neufahrn–Munich Airport (S1) (KBS 999.1)
- Platforms: 1 island platform
- Tracks: 2
- Train operators: S-Bahn München, Agilis, DB Regio Bayern
- Connections: 512, 635, X109; Lufthansa Express Bus

Construction
- Accessible: Yes

Other information
- Station code: 1822
- DS100 code: MFHT
- IBNR: 8004168
- Category: 4
- Fare zone: : 5
- Website: stationsdatenbank.de; www.bahnhof.de

History
- Opened: 7 March 1992; 34 years ago

Services
Preceding station	Agilis / DB Regio Bayern	Following station
Munich Airport Besucherpark towards Nürnberg Hbf	RE 22	Terminus
Preceding station	Munich S-Bahn	Following station
Munich Airport Besucherpark towards Munich Leuchtenbergring	S1	Terminus
Munich Airport Besucherpark towards Herrsching	S8	Terminus
Location

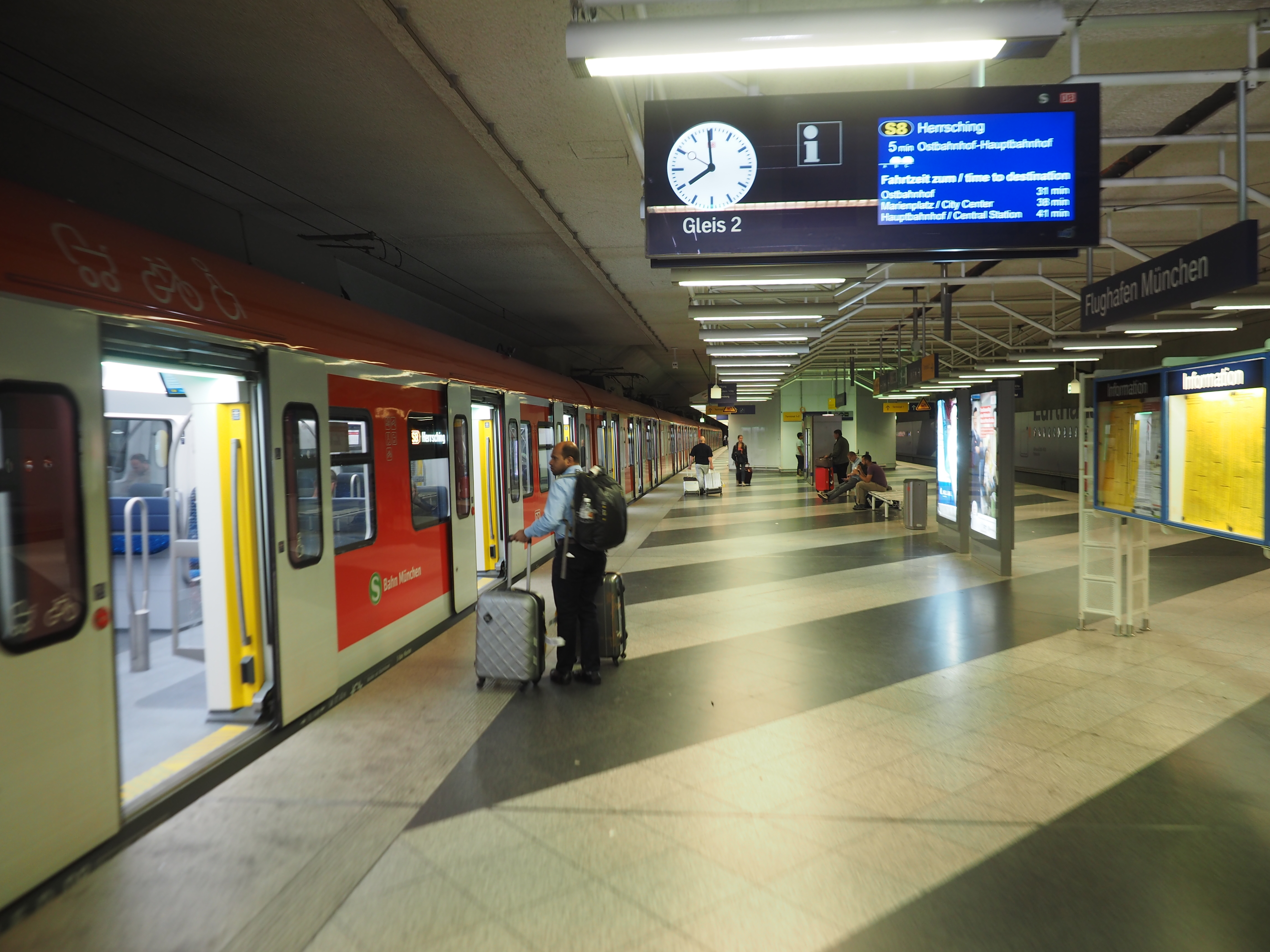
The S-Bahn platform of the Munich Airport Terminal station, with a train on line S8 about to leave for the city centre

Munich Airport Terminal station (German: Bahnhof München Flughafen Terminal) is a Munich S-Bahn terminal station at Munich Airport at the end of the Munich East–Munich Airport railway. It is connected to the city by lines S1 and S8. The ride takes approximately 45 minutes to the Marienplatz station in the city centre.

Munich Airport station is located in a tunnel beneath the central area. A second station, Besucherpark (Visitors' Park) connects the cargo and maintenance areas, long-term parking, administrative buildings and the name-giving Visitors' Park.

A second tunnel beneath the terminals is currently unused. Originally, there were plans to use it for intercity railway, then for a Transrapid maglev train making the trip to München Hauptbahnhof in 10 minutes. However, this project was cancelled in March 2008 due to cost escalation.

== Operations ==
Munich Airport Terminal station is served by the following regional and S-Bahn services:

=== Regional services ===
Line	Route	Frequency	Operator
RE 22	Überregionaler-Flughafenexpress: Munich Airport Terminal – Freising – Landshut – Regensburg – Nürnberg	Hourly	DB Regio AG, Agilis

=== S-Bahn services ===
Line	Route	Frequency	Operator
S1 (Munich)	Munich Airport Terminal – Neufahrn – Moosach – Hackerbrücke – Munich – Munich East – Leuchtenbergring	every 20 minutes	DB Regio AG
S8 (Munich)	Munich Airport Terminal – Ismaning – Munich East – Munich – Hackerbrücke – Pasing – Freiham – Herrsching	every 20 minutes	DB Regio AG

=== Bus services ===
Line	Route
512	Munich Airport Terminal – Schwaig – Oberding – Erding – Oberding – Munich Airport Terminal
635	Munich Airport Terminal – Besucherpark – P41/Novotel – Letter Center – Freising
