= S1 (Munich) =

Railway line of the Munich S-Bahn

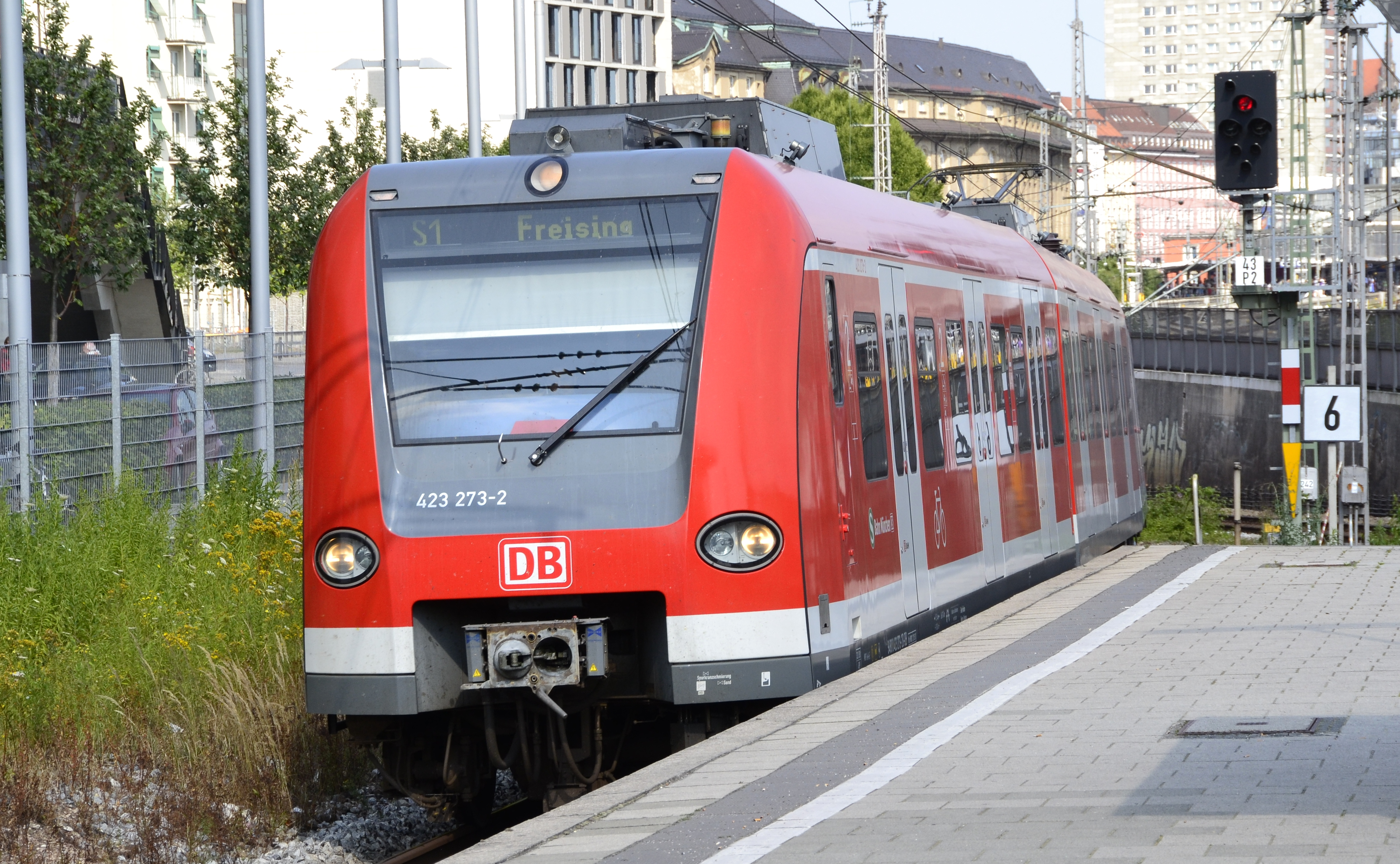

Overview
- System: Munich S-Bahn
- Locale: Munich, Bavaria, Germany
- Current operator(s): S-Bahn Munich

Technical
- Rolling stock: DBAG Class 423
- Electrification: 15 kV, 16.7 Hz AC Overhead lines
- Timetable number(s): 999.1

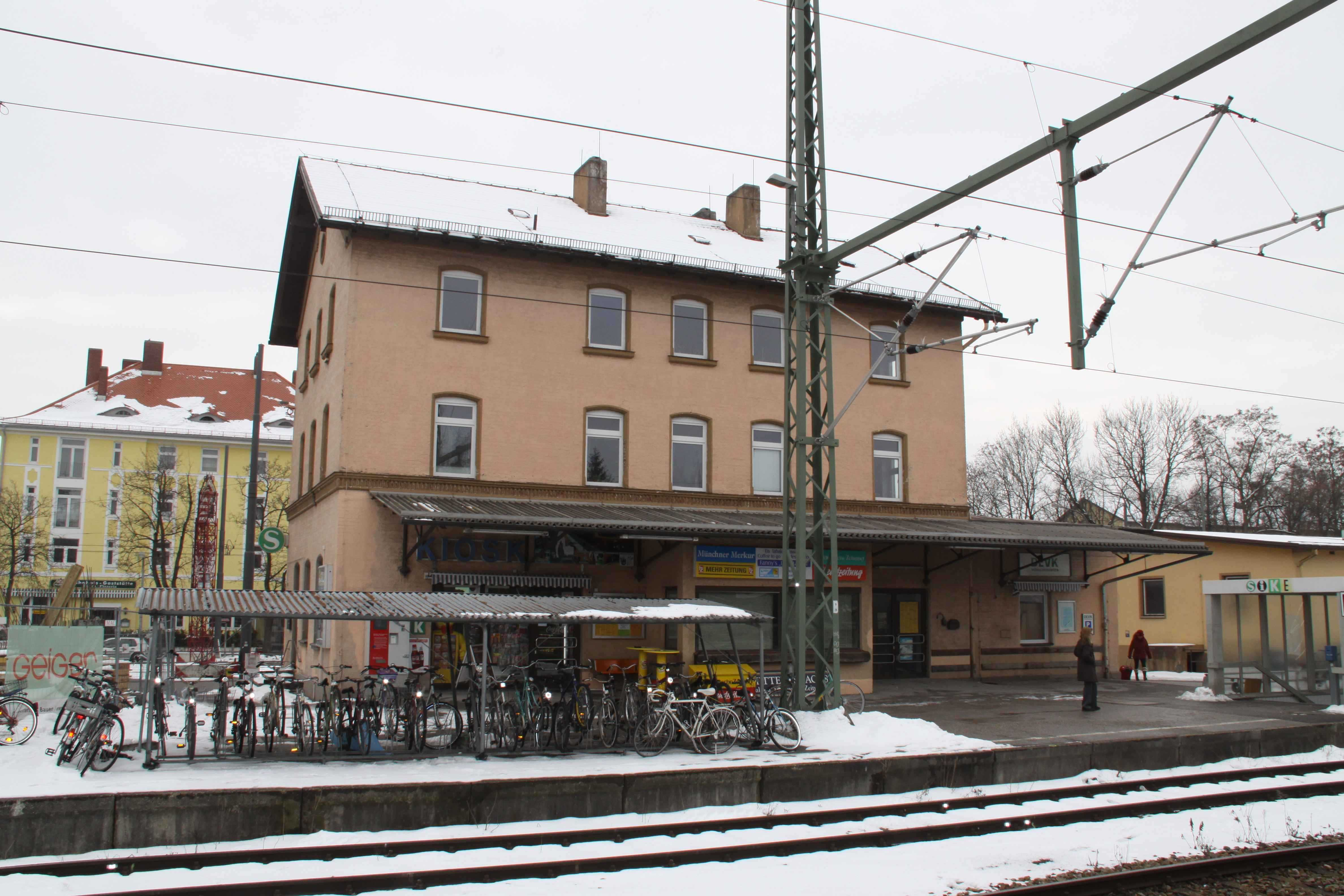
München Moosach station

The S1 is a service on the Munich S-Bahn network. It is operated by DB Regio Bayern. It runs from Munich Airport station and Freising to Neufahrn bei Freising station, where most trains are coupled (and uncoupled in the opposite direction). Trains continue via Feldmoching, Laim, München Hauptbahnhof (central station) to Munich East and Leuchtenbergring.

The service is operated at 20-minute intervals between Munich Airport station and East Munich. Two out of three trains per hour continue from Neufahrn bei Freising to Freising, so that the headway between trains alternates between 20 and 40 minutes. It is operated using class 423 four-car electric multiple units, usually as two coupled sets. In the evenings and on Sundays they generally run as single sets.

The service runs over lines built at various times:

- from Munich Airport to Neufahrn bei Freising over the Neufahrn Link, opened by Deutsche Bahn on 29 November 1998
- from Freising to Laim over the Munich–Regensburg railway, opened by the Royal Bavarian Eastern Railway Company on 3 November 1858. The section from Feldmoching to a point to the east of Donnersbergerbrücke was relocated to the west on 28 September 1892.
- from Laim to the approaches to Munich Central Station (Hauptbahnhof) over a section of the S-Bahn trunk line laid parallel to the Munich–Augsburg railway, opened by the Munich–Augsburg Railway Company on 1 September 1839
- the underground section of the S-Bahn trunk line from the approaches to Munich Central Station to Munich East station, opened on 1 May 1971.

S-Bahn services commenced on 28 May 1972 as between Freising and Kreuzstraße. took over the section from Munich East to Kreuzstraße on 10 June 2001. Services to Munich Airport commenced on 29 November 1998.
