= Munich Leuchtenbergring station =

Munich S-Bahn station

München Leuchtenbergring
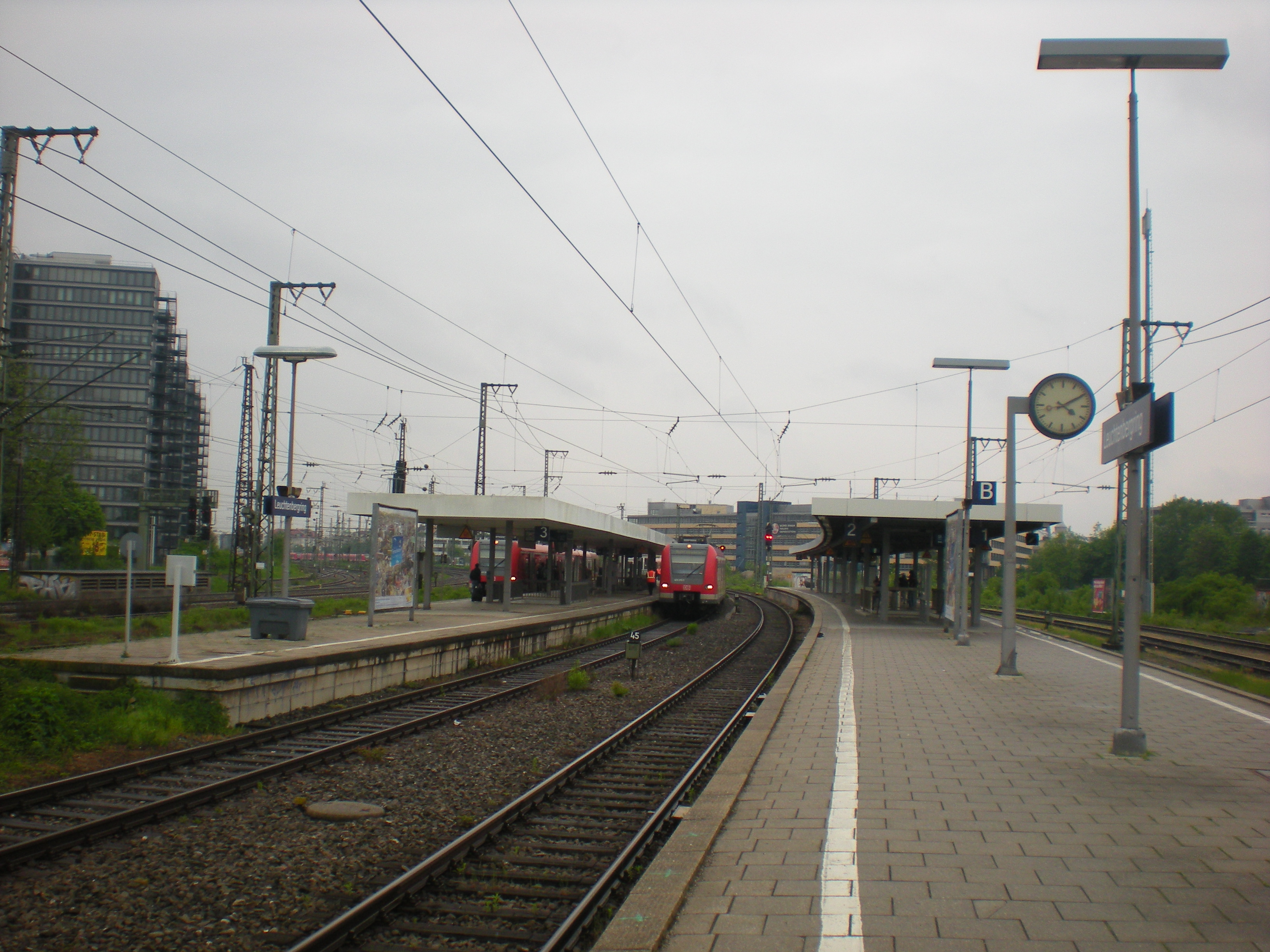
- 2012

General information
- Location: Leuchtenbergring; 81677 Munich-Bogenhausen; Bavaria, Germany
- Coordinates: 48°8′3.26″N 11°36′57.57″E
- Owner: Deutsche Bahn
- Operator: DB Netz; DB Station&Service
- Line: Munich–Rosenheim railway
- Platforms: 2 island platforms
- Tracks: 4
- Train operators: S-Bahn München
- Connections: 149, 9410, N74, X30

Construction
- Parking: no
- Cycle facilities: yes
- Accessible: no

Other information
- Station code: 4239
- DS100 code: MLEU
- IBNR: 8004134
- Category: 4
- Fare zone: : M
- Website: www.bahnhof.de

History
- Opened: 27 May 1972; 54 years ago

Services
Preceding station	Munich S-Bahn	Following station
Munich East towards Freising or Flughafen	S1	Terminus
Munich East towards Petershausen or Altomünster	S2	Berg am Laim towards Erding
Munich East towards Geltendorf	S4	Berg am Laim towards Ebersberg
Munich East towards Tutzing	S6	Berg am Laim towards Ebersberg
Munich East towards Herrsching	S8	Daglfing towards Flughafen
Location

Munich Leuchtenbergring is a railway station on the Munich–Salzburg line in the Bogenhausen quarter of Munich, Germany. It is an elevated station above the Leuchtenbergring, part of Munich's Mittlerer Ring road system. The station serves both the Eastern part of Bogenhausen (north of the railway tracks) and the western part of Berg am Laim (south of the tracks). It is served by S-Bahn lines S1, S2, S4, S6 and S8.

The station is served by bus line 59. The tram station Ampfingstraße on line 21 is nearby.

== Places nearby ==
- München Ostbahnhof
- Prinzregentenstraße
- Prinzregententheater
