= Bayerbach bei Ergoldsbach =

- Municipality
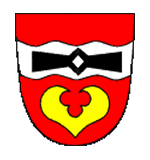
- Coat of arms

- Location of Bayerbach bei Ergoldsbach within Landshut district
- Interactive map of Bayerbach bei Ergoldsbach
- Location within Germany Location within Bavaria
- Coordinates: 48°42′N 12°18′E
- Country: Germany
- State: Bavaria
- Admin. region: Niederbayern
- District: Landshut
- Municipal assoc.: Ergoldsbach

Government
  - Mayor (2020–26): Werner Klanikow

Area
  - Total: 25.42 km^{2} (9.81 sq mi)
- Elevation: 409 m (1,342 ft)

Population (2025-12-31)
  - Total: 2,008
  - Density: 78.99/km^{2} (204.6/sq mi)
- Time zone: UTC+01:00 (CET)
  - Summer (DST): UTC+02:00 (CEST)
- Postal codes: 84092
- Dialling codes: 08774
- Vehicle registration: LA
- Website: www.vgem-ergoldsbach.de

Bayerbach is a municipality in the district of Landshut in Bavaria in Germany.

== Geography ==
It is located on the Bayerbacher Bach, a stream which issues into the Kleine Laber.

=== Subdivisions ===
Bayerbach bei Ergoldsbach consists of 22 villages:

- Bayerbach bei Ergoldsbach
- Böglkreut
- Dürnaich
- Feistenaich
- Feuchten
- Ganslmaier
- Gerabach
- Gillisau
- Greilsberg
- Hochmoos
- Hölskofen
- Kleinfeuchten
- Lottokreut
- Mausham
- Mausloch
- Nißlpram
- Penk
- Pirket
- Pram
- Runding
- Sand
- Winkelmoos

=== Neighbouring communities ===
- Ergoldsbach
- Postau
- Weng
- Mengkofen (Dingolfing-Landau)
- Laberweinting (Straubing-Bogen)
- Mallersdorf-Pfaffenberg (Straubing-Bogen)

== Main sights ==
- Castle Peuerbach (15th century, rebuilt 1892/93)
- Church of Mariä Himmelfahrt (Neogothic building 1865/67)

== Sons and daughters of Bayerbach bei Ergoldsbach ==
- Karl Bickleder (1888–1958), German politician (BVP and CSU), member of the Landtag of Bavaria.
