= Landshut–Rottenburg railway =

Branch line in Bavaria, Germany

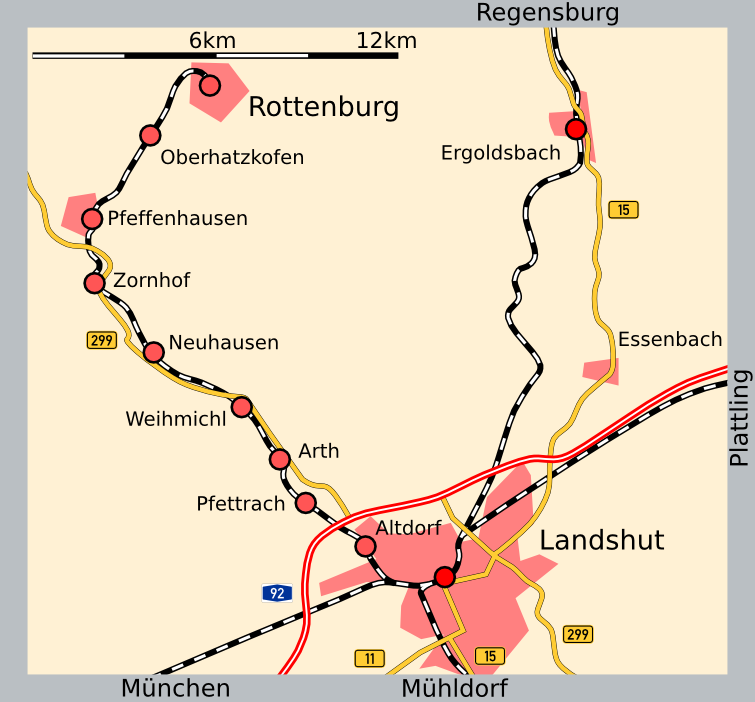

Service
- Route number: 932

Technical
- Line length: 27.46 km (17.06 mi)
- Track gauge: 1,435 mm (4 ft 8 1/2 in)
- Minimum radius: 300 m (984 ft)
- Maximum incline: 2.5 %

The Landshut–Rottenburg railway was a German branch line in the southern state of Bavaria. It was a stub line, about 27.5 kilometres long, from Landshut to Rottenburg an der Laaber, and was known by the locals as the Rottenburger Bockerl (‘Rottenburg Goat’). Although the line is now closed, there is a plan to establish a museum railway on the remaining section from Landshut to Unterneuhausen.

== Planning ==
As early as 1867 and 1878, options were explored for linking the towns of Landshut and Ingolstadt with of a railway, not least for military reasons. These investigations showed, however, that there was no widespread desire for through services. So in 1890 the Landshut town council awarded a contract for the assessing the construction of a railway from Landshut to Pfeffenhausen and a second one from Pfeffenhausen to Eggmühl.

In September 1891 the Munich-based Lokalbahn AG gave its report. This envisaged a 20.09 kilometre-long route to Pfeffenhausen at a cost of 1,250,000 marks. However it concluded that the construction of a route from Pfeffenhausen to Eggmühl would not have met the transportation interests of the upper Laaber Valley, which was aligned with the county capital of Landshut.

So the Royal Bavarian State Government decided, in the supplement to the draft of the Lokalbahn ('local line') law of 12 December 1895, that a Lokalbahn from Landshut to Pfeffenhausen with an extension to Rottenburg would be the most appropriate course. The option of extending it to Ingolstadt was left open. Land required for the construction of the line was transferred to the Bavarian state at no cost. On 17 June 1896 the "Landshut–Rottenburg Localbahn project" was approved under a Lokalbahn law. It was promised that this would deliver advantages, especially for local farmers, not just for the growing of cereals and farming of cattle but also for hop cultivation in the Hallertau.

== Construction ==
At that time it was common for many Italian workers to be employed when a railway was being built. The greatest inclines were the ramp at Arth (20‰), the watershed between Pfettrach and Laber (23‰) and the high ridge of Pfeffenhausen in the direction of Rottenburg (25‰). The terminal station in Rottenburg was 1.1 kilometres from the market, which was 20 metres above the level of the station.

The first cost estimate came to 1,444,000 marks. Between Landshut and Pfeffenhausen a route was selected that was about one kilometre shorter than originally planned, which meant that only 170,000 m³ of earth needed to be moved. Thus the final cost amounted to 1,377,763 marks, of which the state contributed 1,210,499 marks. On 29 October 1900 the first trial run took place with a Bavarian D VII steam engine in charge and on 3 November the route was opened in festive style with four special trains being laid on.

== Operations ==
The Rottenburger Bockerl was a typical Bavarian Lokalbahn, running past large fields of grain and hops as well as farmyards and mills. Its services included many GmP mixed trains, which had long journey times due to the need to shunt wagons at stations en route. Passenger numbers were boosted by visitors to the weekly and annual markets as well as the cattle markets. Pure goods trains were initially quite rare.

Until 1930, two Bavarian Class D XI (later DRG Class 98.4-5) steam locomotives handled the work, supplemented occasionally by a D VII (DRG Class 98.76). The nature of the route and the quality of the track only permitted a top speed of 30 km/h. In summer 1921 three trains ran in each direction daily. The evening train needed 99 minutes, which equated to an average speed of just 16.7 km/h. At track crossings the train could only proceed at 15 km/h and, in some cases, just 10 km/h, ringing its bell as a warning.

The Zornhof mountain was notorious: leaf fall in the autumn or snow in winter meant that, sometimes, the locomotive in charge of heavily loaded trains would get stuck with its wheels spinning. Then a fresh attempt had to be made with fewer coaches. Around 1930 the two D XI's were reinforced by a BB II (DRG Class 98.7).

From 1935 to about 1940 the line was worked by a D XI, a BB II and a Pt 2/3 (DRG Class 70). In 1940 the Pt 2/3 was replaced by a GtL 4/4 (DRG Class 98.8-9). From 1943 onwards only Class Pt 2/3 engines were used. In 1951 the GtL 4/5 (DRG Class 98.10) took their place. After the summer timetable of 1952 the journey still took a good hour.

After the timetable change in 1955 the majority of the steam engines disappeared from the line, just one remained for hauling school trains, usually the GtL 4/5, no. 98 1006. Uerdingen railbuses now appeared in service and were used in a VT 98 + VB 98 + VS 98 combination. Sometimes a VB 140 was also used, initially with a goods van for part-load goods. Passenger and goods trains were hauled by Class 64 steam engines and, later, by V 100 diesels.

== The end ==
In spite of all efforts to the contrary, traffic increasingly transferred from rail to roads. With the timetable change on 25 May 1974 passenger services ceased and were switched to railway-owned buses. Railbus no. 798 669-8 was the last passenger service, running that day from Landshut to Rottenburg with members of the Landshut model railway club The Rottenburg town band played Ich hatt' einen Kameraden ("I had a comrade") and, at 8.45 pm, the railbus set off on its return journey.

Railway facilities no longer needed for goods traffic disappeared. The station building at Weihmichl was demolished in September 1974 and the linesman's hut (Wartehäuschen) at Arth in February 1975. On 31 January 1982 the ticket and parcels offices at Rottenburg station were closed.

The small amount of goods traffic was handled by DB Class V 60 (later renamed Class 260) diesel locos. Occasionally engines of classes 211, 212 and 218 were used.

In 1990 the Rottenburg Bockerl Society (Interessengemeinschaft Rottenburger Bockerl) was founded; in 1994 it was renamed to the Landshut-Rottenburg Steam Train Society (Dampfzugfreunde Landshut-Rottenburg). Since the early 1990s locomotives of classes 365 and 335 have run on Mondays, Wednesdays and Fridays (request only) to Rottenburg for shunting duties. Despite the track being refurbished in the 1980s, the top speed is in most places still only 30 km/h as it was when the line was first opened. The society regularly organises specials. O 12 June 1994 no. V 200 002 hauled a special to Rottenburg. Other specials were hauled by locomotive no. 23 105 on 27 June 1993 and no. 41 1150 on 14 August 1994.

On 27 September 1998 the steam locomotive no. 41 1150 made a farewell journey, the last train to run on the entire route. From Unterneuhausen (km 14.2) to Rottenburg the track and sleepers were removed from the ballast bed in 2002/03.

Since 15 September 2000 the remaining section of the line has been rented from its owner, DB Netz, to the Landshut-Rottenburg Steam Train Society (infrastructure company: BayernBahn), which hopes to run a museum railway on it. The necessary concession was granted in 2005, however its operation has been repeatedly delayed. In the area of the level crossing over the B 299 at Oberndorf near Weihmichl the track and trackbed had been fully replaced by the end of 2007 over a length of 50 m, after a large quantity of diesel fuel had leaked into the soil following an accident with a lorry tanker on 14 September 2006. The county of Landshut and the village of Altdorf are sceptical about the museum project: The council and mayor have repeated several times "that it is their aim to get rid of the railway and built a footpath and cycle way on the trackbed".

== See also ==
- Royal Bavarian State Railways
- Bavarian branch lines
- List of closed railway lines in Bavaria

== Sources ==
- Walther Zeitler, Eisenbahnen in Niederbayern and in der Oberpfalz, Buch- and Kunstverlag Oberpfalz, Weiden, 1985, ISBN 3-924350-01-9
- Günter Begert sen., Heinrich Stangl, Landshut (Bay)–Rottenburg (Laaber), Neben- and Schmalspurbahnen in Deutschland (Sammelwerk als Loseblattausgabe), Weltbild Verlag, Augsburg, 1994, ISSN 0949-2143
