= Bayerbacher Bach =

River in Germany

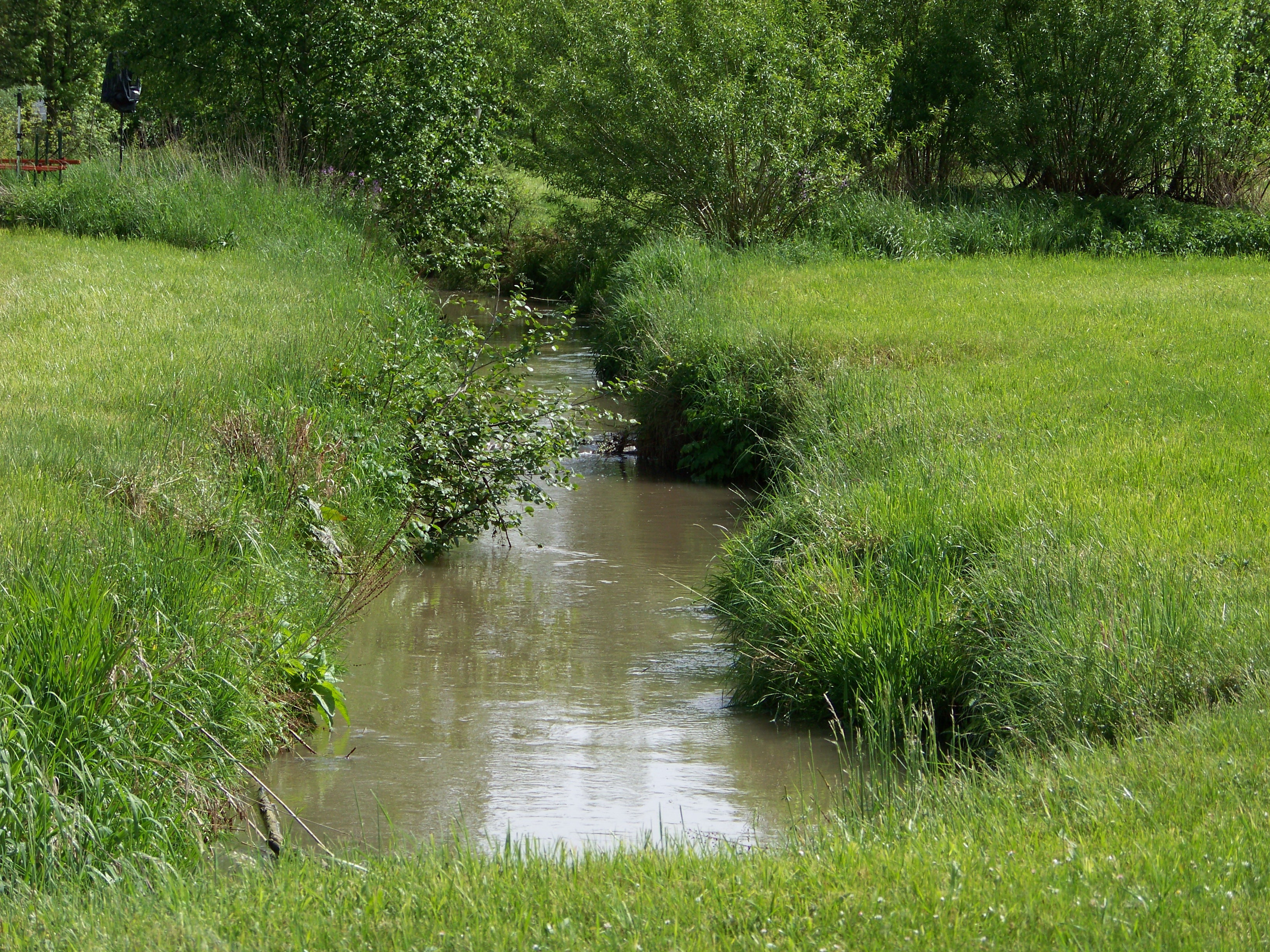
- Bayerbacher Bach near Hofkirchen

Location
- Country: Germany
- State: Bavaria

Physical characteristics
- Source
  - location: near Paindlkofen
- Mouth
  - location: Kleine Laber near Habelsbach
  - coordinates: 48.8051°N 12.3149°E
- Length: 16.36 km (10.17 mi)
- Basin size: 75.09 km^{2} (28.99 sq mi)
- Discharge
  - average: ±0.072 m^{3}/s (2.5 cu ft/s)

Basin features
- Progression: Kleine Laber→ Große Laber→ Danube→ Black Sea

The Bayerbacher Bach or Bayerbach is a stream in Bavaria, Germany. It is a tributary of the Kleine Laber in Lower Bavaria.

== Course ==
From its source in the Landshut district near Paindlkofen, a district of the municipality Ergoldsbach, the Bayerbacher Bach mostly flows in the north direction. Among others the stream runs through Feuchten, Bayerbach and Greilsberg.

Then it enters the district Straubing-Bogen. Finally it reaches the municipality of Laberweinting. There, near Habelsbach, the Bayerbacher Bach issues into the Kleine Laber.

== Tributaries ==
- Wildbach (right)
- Mühlbach (right)
- Gerabach (right)
- Stockaer Bach (left)
- Hillbach (right)
- Oberellenbach (left)
- Asbach (right)
- Ellenbach (right)
- Haadersbach (right)

== See also ==
- List of rivers of Bavaria
