= Neufahrn–Radldorf railway =

Railway line in Germany

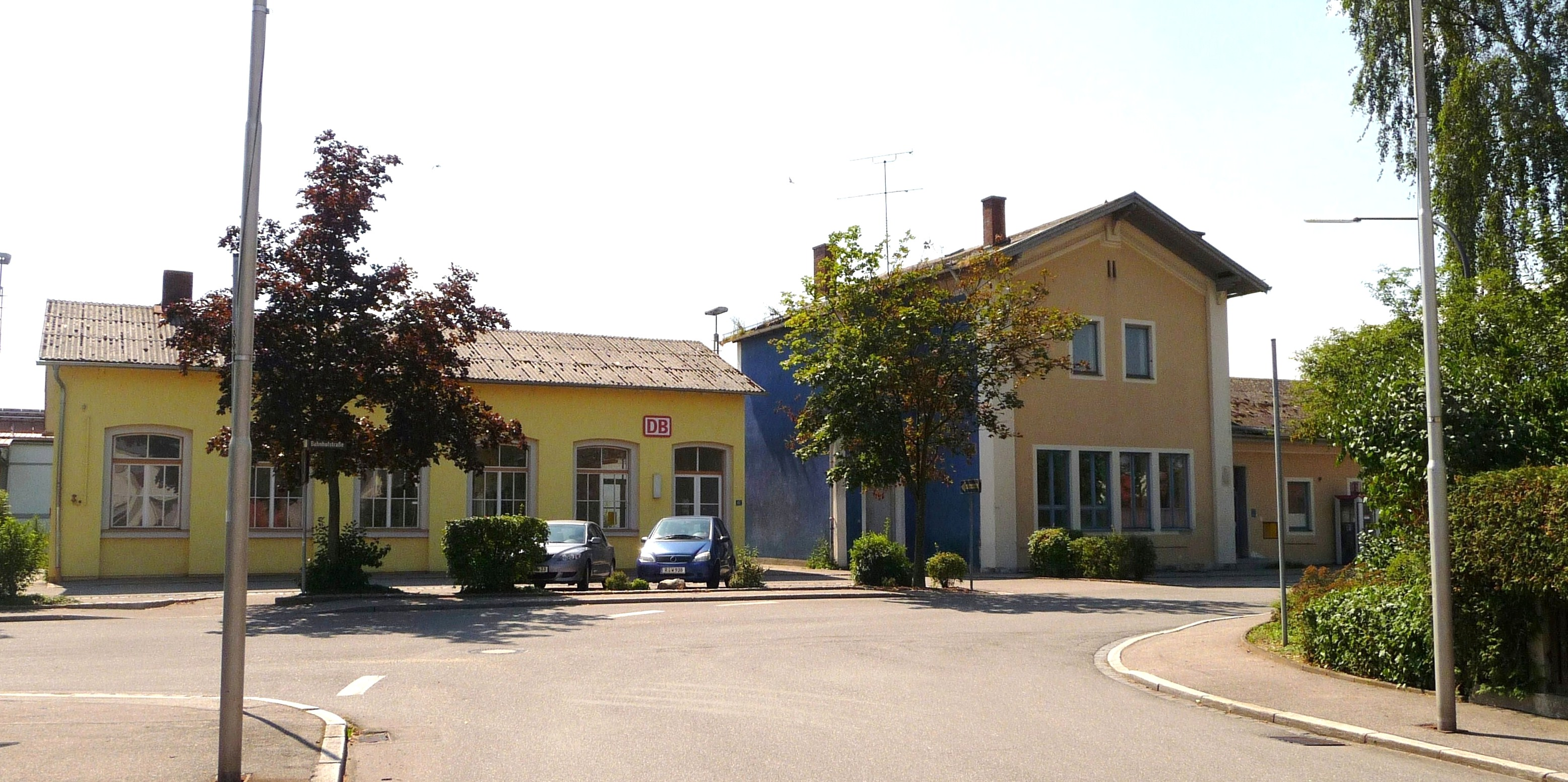
- Geiselhöring station

Overview
- Line number: 5630
- Locale: Bavaria, Germany

Service
- Route number: 932

Technical
- Line length: 26.2 km (16.3 mi)
- Track gauge: 1,435 mm (4 ft 8 1/2 in) standard gauge

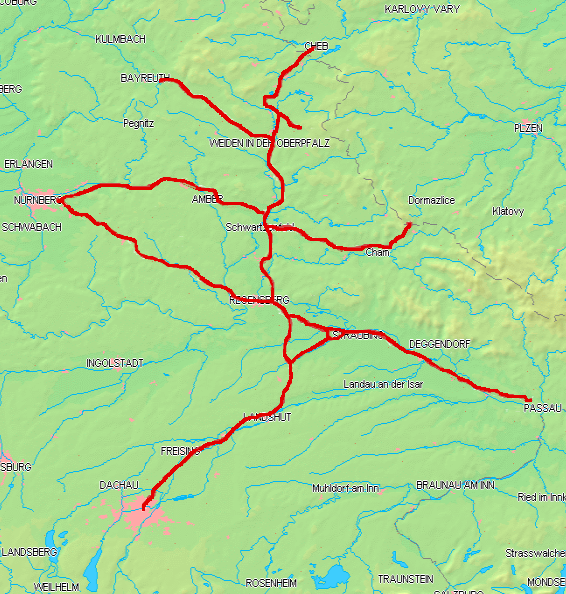
Lines of the Eastern Railway in 1875, including the triangle of railways that connected Geiselhöring, Straubing and Sünching.

The Neufahrn–Radldorf railway is a single-track, non-electrified branch line from Neufahrn along the Kleine Laber (a tributary of the Große Laber) to Radldorf in Lower Bavaria. It was opened in 1859 and is one of the oldest railways in Germany.

== History ==
On 3 November 1858, the first section of the Munich–Regensburg line was opened from Munich to Landshut. The Bavarian Eastern Railway Company (German: Königlich privilegirte Actiengesellschaft der bayerischen Ostbahnen) pushed forward energetically with the construction of the line to Regensburg and Straubing so that on 8 November 1859 a limited freight service was established between Landshut and Straubing. On 12 December 1859, the Geiselhöring–Straubing line was opened and was extended to Passau in 1860, now forming part of the Regensburg–Passau line. The line from Geiselhöring to Regensburg was also opened on 12 December 1859. As a result, Geiselhöring station became an eastern Bavarian railway hub with eleven tracks and a large locomotive depot.

The construction of a shortcut from Neufahrn to Obertraubling between 1870 and 1873 significantly shortened the line from Landshut to Regensburg. The company also built a shorter line from Straubing to Sünching in 1873, making it unnecessary for trains between Regensburg and Passau to travel via Geiselhöring. The Eastern Railway Company and its successor from 1875, the Royal Bavarian State Railways, sought to abandon the line from Geiselhöring to Sünching. The Geiselhöring community fought against this proposal with petitions to various authorities in an attempt to avert the further decline in the importance of Geiselhöring station.

=== The Perkam–Radldorf connection ===
With the opening of the Landshut–Plattling line in 1880, the importance of the Neufahrn–Straubing line gradually declined significantly. The State Railways were now looking for a way to simplify the triangle of railways between Geiselhöring, Straubing and Sünching. Instead of the two branches from Geiselhöring to Straubing and to Sünching, the company wanted to build line in the middle. It decided to build a 2.47 km line from Perkam to Radldorf, which was authorised on 8 March 1894 and built in the summer of 1896. On 26 September 1896 a test run took place and the new line was opened on 30 September.

=== Downgrading to regional line ===
This line from Geiselhöring to Sünching and the old connection to Straubing were closed. The old Perkam station was sold and the bridge was blown up. The Neufahrn–Straubing main line was reclassified as the Neufahrn–Radldorf secondary line. The protests of the affected communities led to an improvement in the proposed timetable, reduced fares and an agreement that the new line would only have bridges, with no level crossings.

== Current operations ==
Since 2002, services on the line have operated under the name of the Gäubodenbahn with class 628 diesel multiple units. Services operate between Neufahrn and Bogen every hour from Monday to Friday and every two hours on Saturday and Sunday. The Gäubodenbahn runs on the Regensburg–Passau line between Radldorf and Straubing and then on the remaining part of the former Straubing–Miltach line. Another pair of trains runs on weekends via Landshut and Mühldorf am Inn to Salzburg.
