= Langenbach =

Langenbach may refer to the following places in Germany:

- Langenbach, Bavaria, a municipality in the district of Freising, Bavaria
  - Langenbach station, railway station of Langenbach, Bavaria
- Langenbach, Kusel, a municipality in the district of Kusel, Rhineland-Palatinate
- Langenbach bei Kirburg, a municipality in the district Westerwaldkreis, Rhineland-Palatinate
- Langenbach (Weilmünster), a village in Weilmünster, Hesse
- Langenbach (Eichelbach), a river of Hesse, tributary of the Eichelbach
- Langenbach (Pausa-Mühltroff), a municipality in the district of Vogtlandkreis, Saxony
