= Landshut (Bayern) Hauptbahnhof =

Railway station in Bavaria, Germany

Landshut (Bayern) Hbf
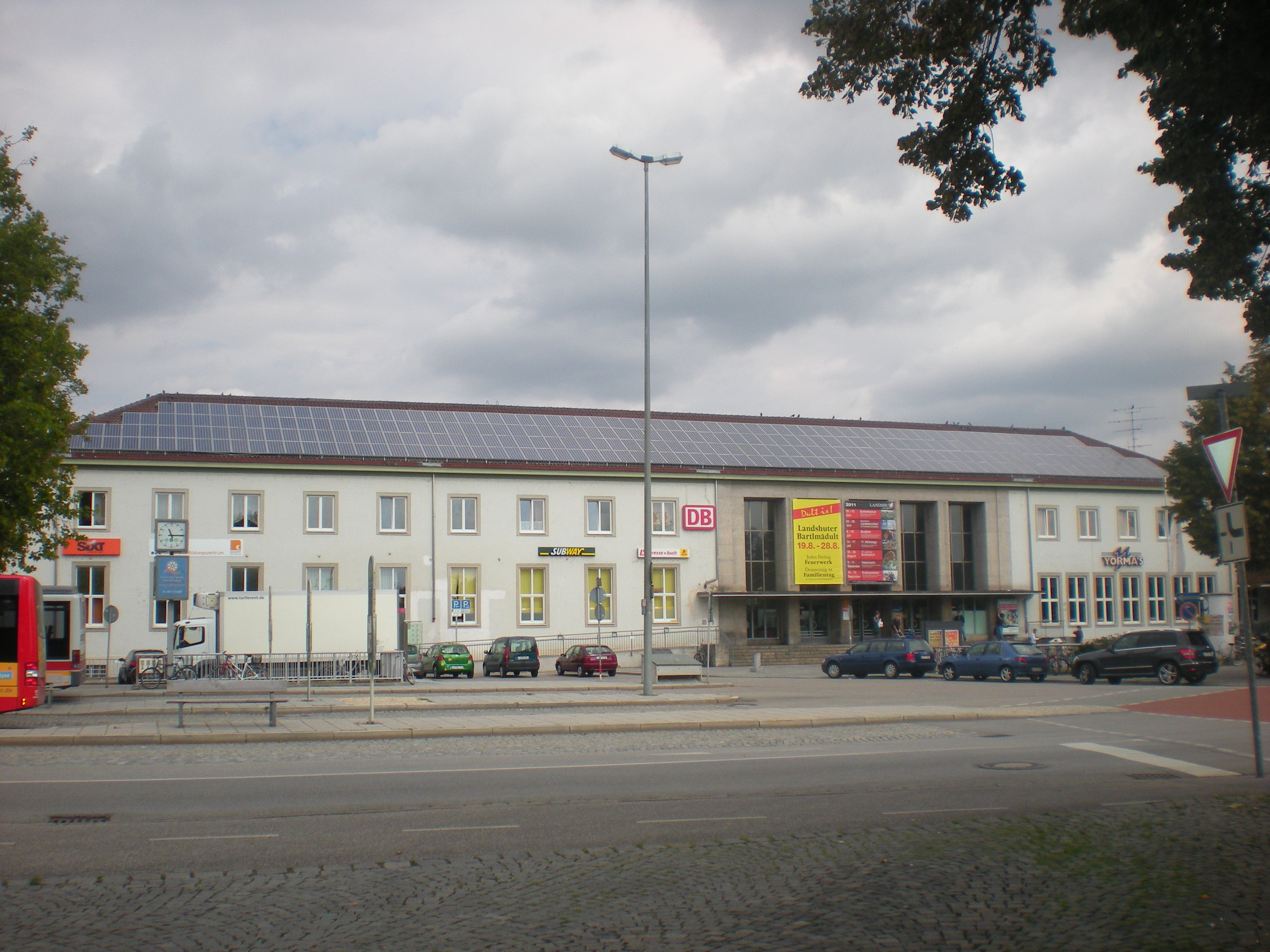
- The front of station building

General information
- Location: Landshut, Bavaria; Germany
- Coordinates: 48°32′54″N 12°8′8″E
- Lines: Munich–Regensburg (KBS 930); Munich–Landshut–Passau (KBS 931); Landshut–Mühldorf (KBS 945); Landshut–Neuhausen (museum railway)
- Platforms: 7

Construction
- Accessible: Yes (except platforms 3&4)

Other information
- Station code: 3513
- DS100 code: MLA
- IBNR: 8000217
- Category: 2
- Fare zone: LAVV: 100 (buses only)
- Website: www.bahnhof.de

History
- Opened: 3 November 1858; 167 years ago
- Electrified: 3 October 1925; 100 years ago

Services
Preceding station		Following station
Freising towards München Hbf	RE 23 Limited service	Neufahrn (Niederbay) towards Hof Hbf
Freising towards München Hbf	RE 25	Neufahrn (Niederbay) towards Praha hl.n.
Preceding station	DB Regio Bayern	Following station
Moosburg towards München Hbf	RE 2	Ergoldsbach towards Hof Hbf
Moosburg towards München Hbf	RE 3	Wörth (Isar) towards Passau Hbf
Moosburg towards München Hbf	RE 50	Ergoldsbach towards Nürnberg Hbf
Gündlkofen towards München Hbf	RB 33	Terminus
Preceding station	Agilis / DB Regio Bayern	Following station
Moosburg towards Munich Airport	RE 22	Ergoldsbach towards Nürnberg Hbf
Preceding station		Following station
Terminus	RB 32 Limited service	Ergoldsbach towards Bogen
Terminus	RB 44	Landshut (Bay) Süd towards Rosenheim
Terminus	RB 45	Landshut (Bay) Süd towards Salzburg Hbf
Location

Landshut (Bayern) Hauptbahnhof is the main railway station in Landshut in the German State of Bavaria. There is also the halt (Haltepunkt) of Landshut (Bay) Süd (Landshut south) on the Neumarkt-Sankt Veit – Landshut railway. The Hauptbahnhof has seven platforms tracks and is classified by Deutsche Bahn as a category 2 station. It is used daily by about 120 trains operated by DB Regio, Regentalbahn and Agilis. Landshut is on the Munich–Regensburg, Munich–Landshut–Passau and Landshut–Mühldorf lines. In addition, the station is located on the Landshut Neuhausen museum line.

== Location ==
The station is located north of the city of Landshut. The station area is bounded to the southeast by Bahnhofstraße, on which is located the station forecourt, which connects via Luitpoldstraße to central Landshut. East of the station is Altdorfer Straße; this runs over a bridge over the railway lands, which was built from 1964 to 1966 and reconstructed from 2007 to 2008. The northern edge of the station area is formed by Oberndorferstraße.

== History ==
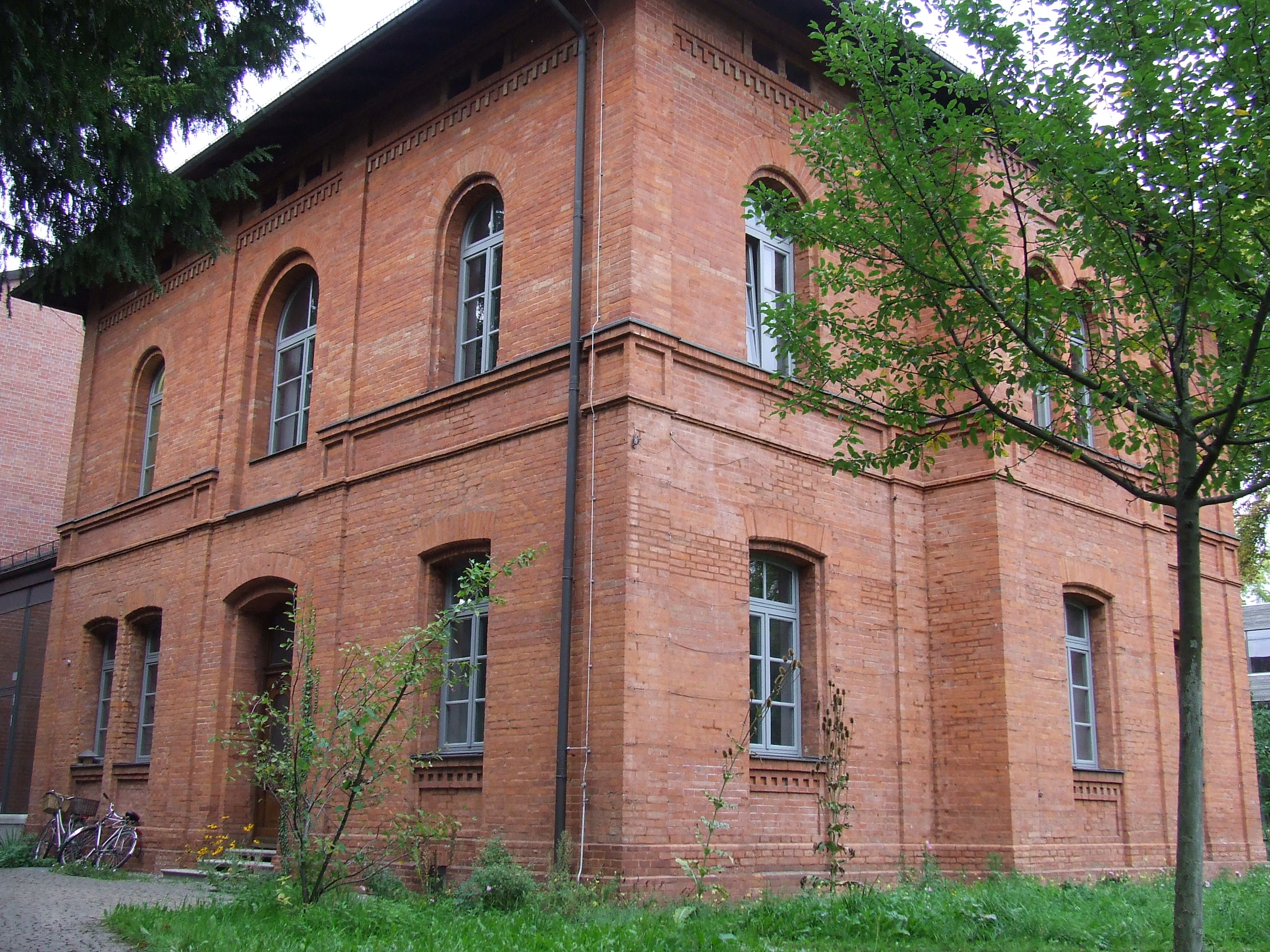
Old Landshut station

=== Old Landshut station ===
In 1854, a terminal station was constructed near the Kleinen Isar (little Isar) river. To protect the station against flooding, numerous earthworks had to be constructed. In 1857, construction started on the station building, which is now a listed building. It was built of brick and designed by the architect Simon Pausinger. A platform area was established only shortly before the opening of the station in April 1858, .

The station opened on 3 November 1858 with the Munich–Landshut line. On 12 December 1859, this was followed by the extension of this line via Geiselhöring to Regensburg. On 6 August 1873, the Neufahrn–Eggmühl–Obertraubling short cut was opened between Landshut and Regensburg, making the detour via Geiselhöring unnecessary. But in the 1870s it was realised that the planned lines could not usefully serve Landshut station. In addition, the station was too small to be the starting point of the new lines.

=== New Landshut station ===
It was eventually decided to build a new through station, which was built from 1876 to 1880. A siding from the old station was used to transport building materials for the new station. On 11 May 1880, station operations were transferred from the old station, which remains in place and is now a listed monument, and the tracks connecting to it were dismantled.

With the opening of the station on 15 May 1880 of the railway line via Pilsting to Plattling was followed by the opening of the Mühldorf–Landshut line on 4 October 1883. Duplication of the line from Munich to Landshut was completed on 28 September 1892. The branch line from Landshut to Rottenburg an der Laaber was opened on 3 November 1900.

On 30 June 1902, a horse tramway was opened from Landshut station to Dreifaltigkeitsplatz. On 15 January 1913, the Landshut tramway was electrified.

On 3 October 1925 the Munich–Landshut line was electrified. This was followed by the electrification of the Landshut–Neufahrn section on 1 October 1926 and the electrification of the entire route from Munich to Regensburg was completed on 10 May 1927.

In the Second World War the entire station area was destroyed by a bombing raid on 19 March 1945. The lines were rebuilt in the postwar years and the station had to be rebuilt due to the extensive damage. The building was opened on 19 March 1954. Also on 19 March 1945, the operation of the Landshut tramway was closed due to destruction of the tram depot in the air attacks.

On 25 May 1976, the line from Landshut to Plattling was electrified. On 25 May 1974, passenger operations on the Landshut–Rottenburg line closed. On 27 September 1998, freight traffic ended on the line and the Neuhausen–Rottenburg section was dismantled. The remaining section has been used as a museum railway since 4 June 2011.

=== Infrastructure ===
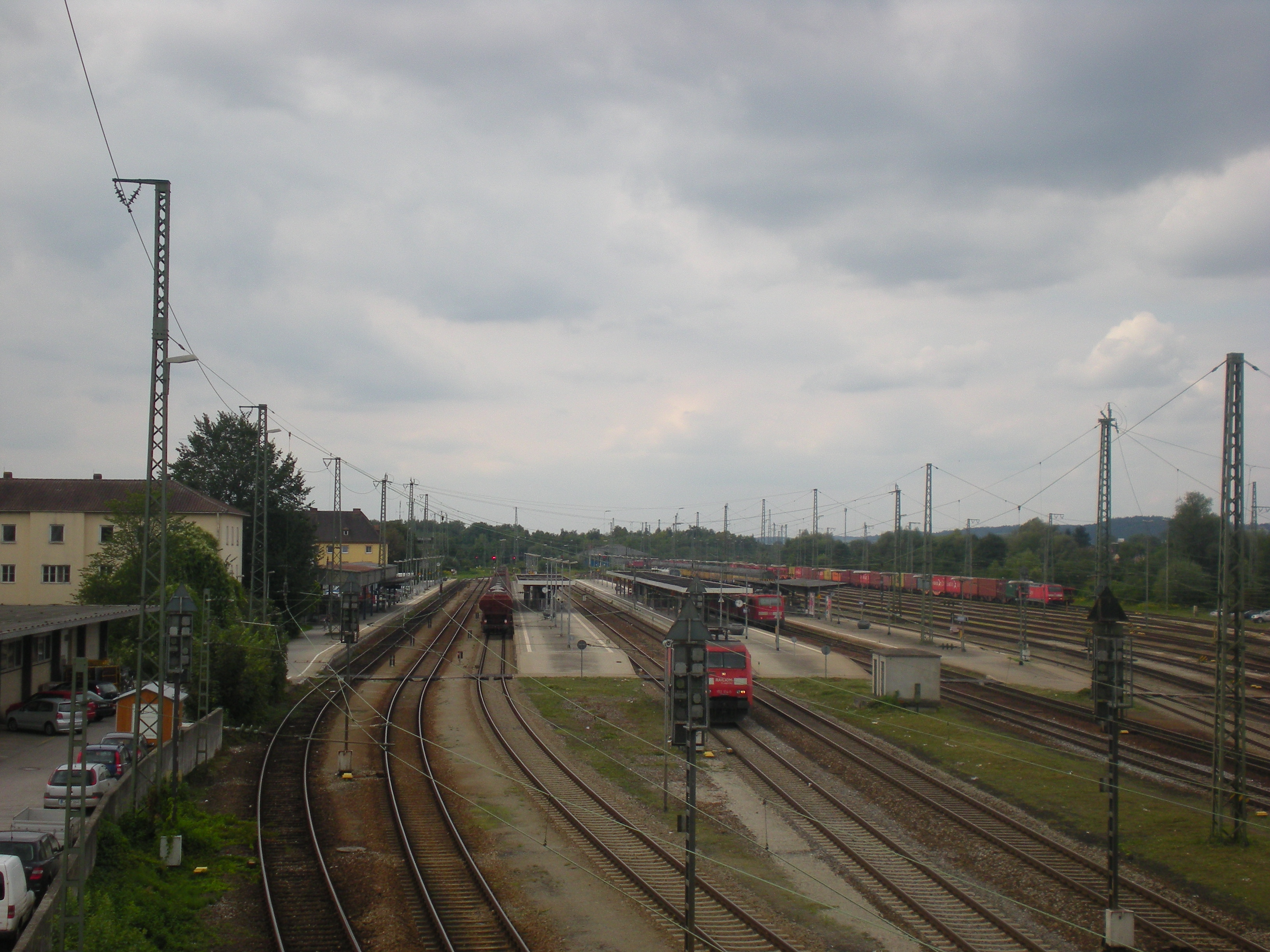
Station yard

The station has seven tracks on four platforms. Track 1 is on the “home” platform next to station building and is served by the Regionalbahn trains towards Mühldorf. Track 2 does not adjoin a platform and is used by through freight traffic. Track 3 is also used by Regionalbahn trains going towards Mühldorf. Tracks 4 and 5 are served by regional services towards Regensburg and Passau and track 6 is served by regional services to Munich. Track 7 is used in particular by Agilis services towards Regensburg and track 8 is used by Regionalbahn trains to Freising. Each platform is covered and has a digital destination display. All platforms are connected via a pedestrian underpass to the home platform. Only the first five tracks are accessible for the disabled as tracks 7 and 8 has no access for the disabled. Parking and bus connections are available at the station.

=== Platform data ===
- Track 1: platform height: 76 cm, length of platform: 365 meters
- Track 3: platform height: 76 cm, length of platform: 334 meters
- Track 4: platform height: 76 cm, length of platform: 334 meters
- Track 5: platform height: 76 cm, length of platform: 366 meters
- Track 6: platform height: 76 cm, length of platform: 366 meters
- Track 7: platform height: 30 cm, length of platform: 452 meters
- Track 8: platform height: 30 cm, length of platform: 452 meters

== Rail services ==
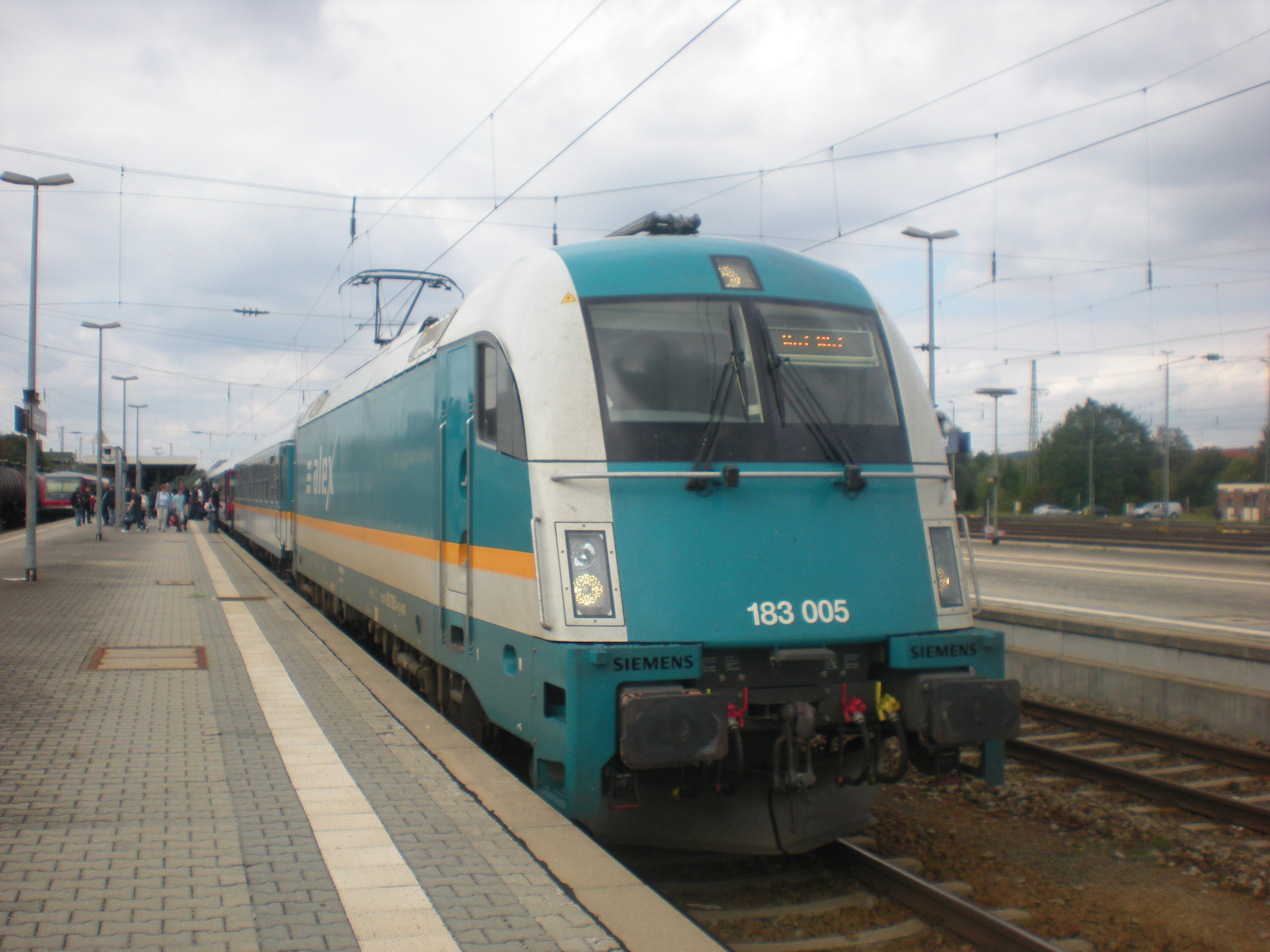
ALEX at Hof station

Since 9 December 2007, Arriva-Länderbahn-Express (ALEX) services run every two hours; these are operated by Länderbahn. Services of the Donau-Isar-Express run hourly from Munich to Passau and the Munich–Nuremberg–Regensburg Regional-Express service runs every two hours. In addition, Regionalbahn services run every hour between Freising and Landshut, serving all stops, unlike the Regional-Expresses.

Landshut station is part of the "Mühldorf line star" (Linienstern Mühldorf) network, so every hour Regionalbahn services of SüdostBayernBahn run via Mühldorf to Freilassing or Rosenheim. In addition, Landshut is the terminus of individual Agilis services running via Regensburg to Ingolstadt.

The last long-distance service, a EuroCity service to Prague, ran a few years before the start of ALEX, which now operates on this route.

Line	Route	Frequency
RE 2/RE 25	Munich – Landshut – Regensburg – Schwandorf – Weiden – Marktredwitz – Hof / Prague	Every 2 hours
RE 22	Munich Airport – Freising – Moosburg – Landshut – Regensburg	Hourly
RE 23	Munich – Landshut – Regensburg – Schwandorf – Weiden – Marktredwitz – Hof	Some trains
RE 3	Donau-Isar-Express: München – Landshut – Neufahrn (Niederbayern) – Plattling – Passau	Hourly
RE 50	Munich – Landshut – Regensburg – Neumarkt – Nuremberg	One train pair
RB 32	Landshut – Ergoldsbach – Neufahrn (Niederbayern) – Sallach – Straubing – Straubing Hafen – Bogen	Some trains
RB 33	(Munich –) Freising – Langenbach (Oberbay) – Moosburg – Landshut	Approx every 2 hours, extra peak services
RB 44	Landshut – Neumarkt-Sankt Veit – Mühldorf – Wasserburg (Inn) – Rosenheim	Every 2 hours
RB 45	(Bogen – Straubing –) Landshut – Neumarkt-Sankt Veit – Mühldorf – Freilassing (– Salzburg)	Every 2 hours
