= Hartlaber =

River in Germany

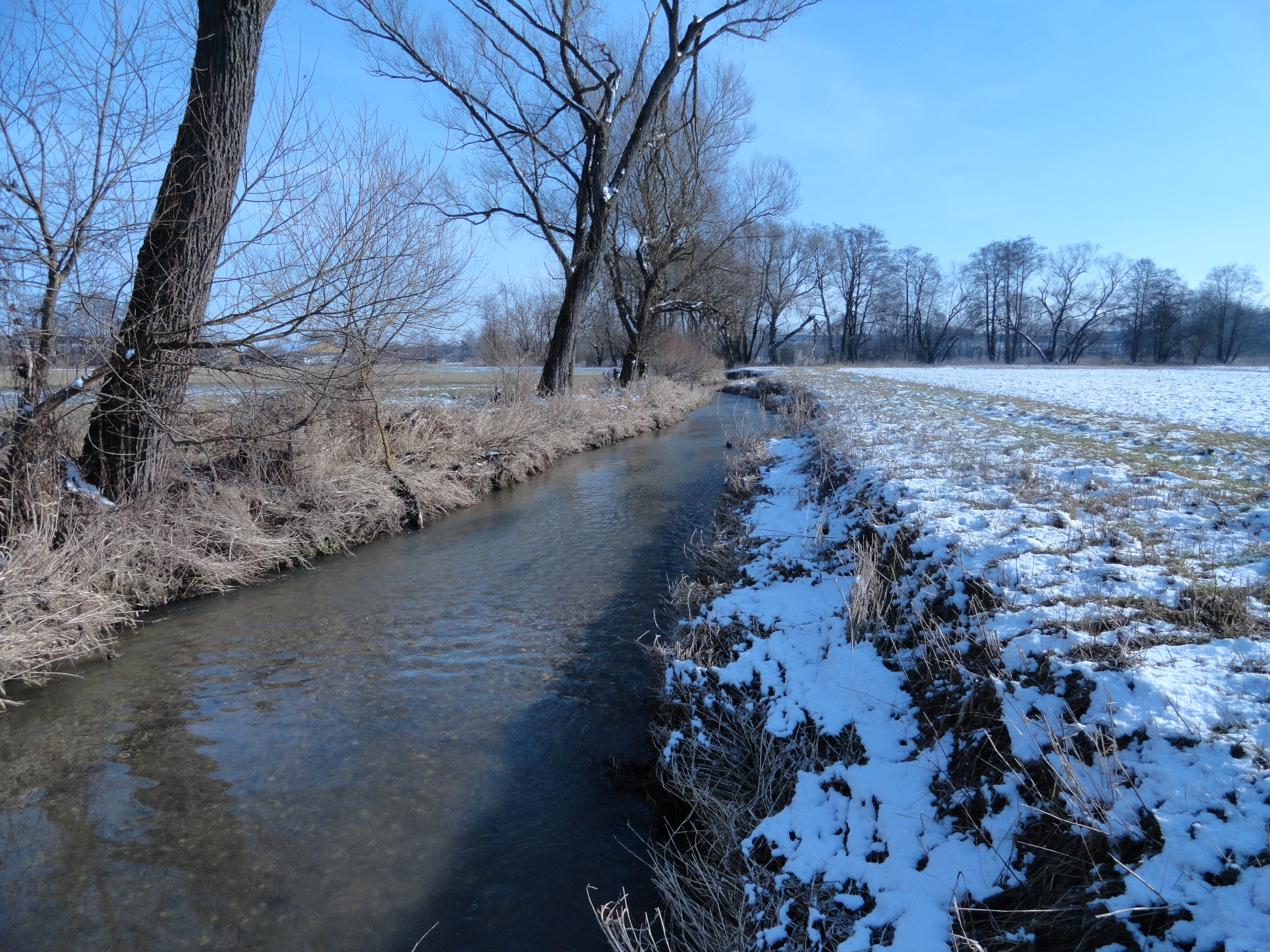
- The Hartlaber near Haidenkofen

Location
- Country: Germany
- State: Bavaria

Physical characteristics
- Source
  - location: Haidenkofen (Sünching)
- Mouth
  - location: Schönach (Mötzing)
  - coordinates: 48.9088°N 12.4117°E
- Length: 8.38 km (5.21 mi)
- Basin size: 51.27 km^{2} (19.80 sq mi)

The Hartlaber is a stream in Bavaria, Germany. It is a distributary of the Große Laber in Lower Bavaria.

== Course ==
The Hartlaber branches off the Große Laber west from Sünching-Haidenkofen to the right. After 8.38 km it flows back into the Große Laber between Mötzing-Oberhaimbuch and -Schönach.

== Main tributaries ==
- Moosbach
- Röhrbach

== See also ==
- List of rivers of Bavaria
