= Karl Bickleder =

German politician

Karl Bickleder (October 21, 1888 in Bayerbach bei Ergoldsbach - February 4, 1958 in Straubing) was a German politician, representative of the Bavarian People's Party and the Christian Social Union of Bavaria. He was a representative of the Landtag of Bavaria.

== See also ==
- List of Bavarian Christian Social Union politicians
