= Ginhart =

- Village of Mengkofen
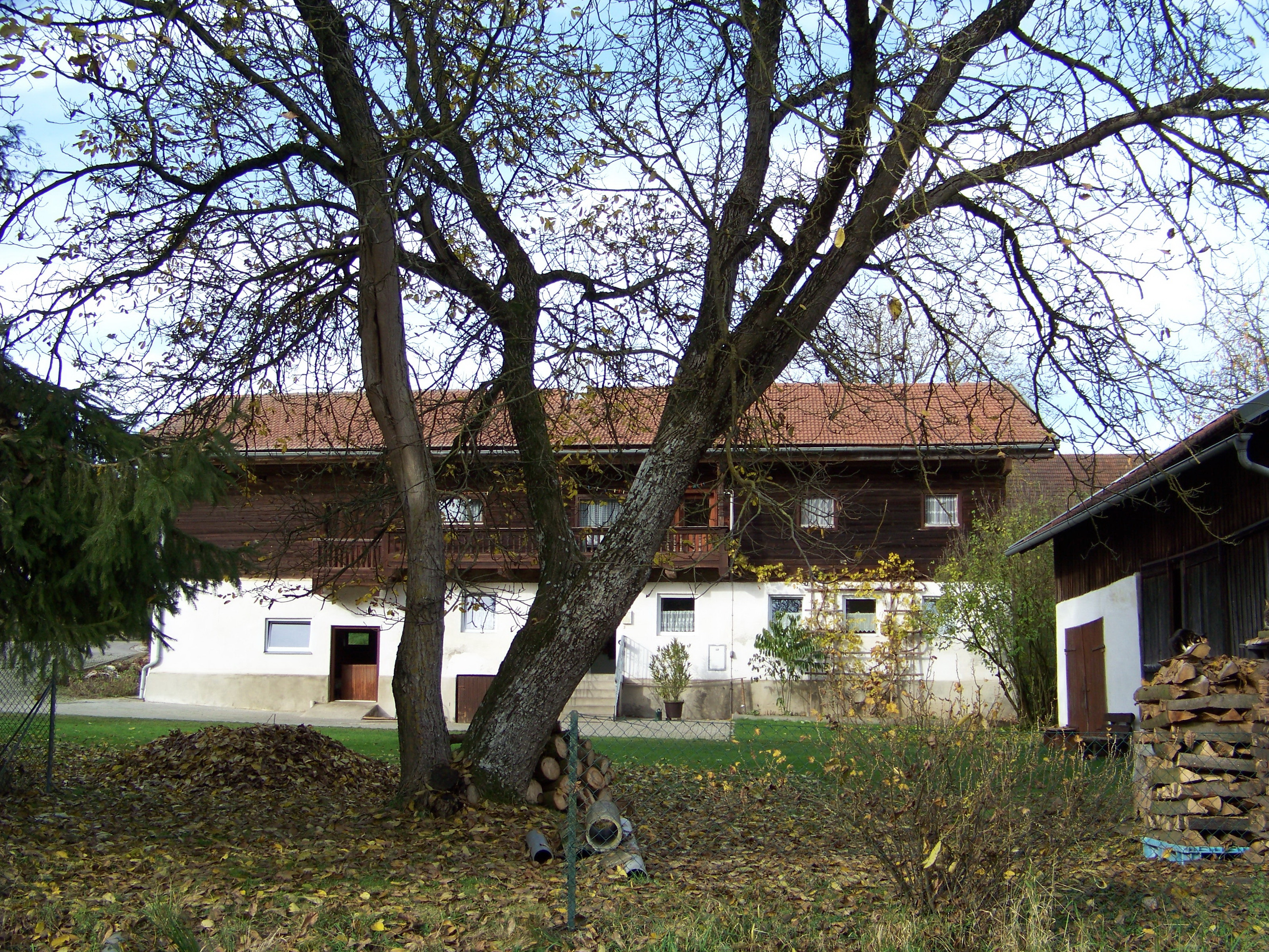
- Interactive map of Ginhart
- Location within Germany Location within Bavaria
- Coordinates: 48°43′5.8″N 12°20′5.22″E
- Country: Germany
- State: Bavaria
- Admin. region: Lower Bavaria
- District: Dingolfing-Landau
- Municipality: Mengkofen

Population (1987)
  - Total: 28
- Time zone: UTC+01:00 (CET)
  - Summer (DST): UTC+02:00 (CEST)
- Postal codes: 84152
- Dialling codes: 08733
- Vehicle registration: DGF

Ginhart is a German hamlet (Weiler) of the municipality of Mengkofen, Dingolfing-Landau district, Lower Bavaria, Bavaria. As of the last census of population, 1987, it had a population of 28.

== Overview ==
Ginhart had been a part of the municipality of Asbach until 1970. When Asbach was split up between Süßkofen and Laberweinting in 1970, Ginhart was added to the municipality of Süßkofen. Süßkofen was integrated into Mengkofen on May 1, 1978.
