= Langenbach station =

Railway halt in Langenbach, Germany

Langenbach Langenbach (Oberbay)
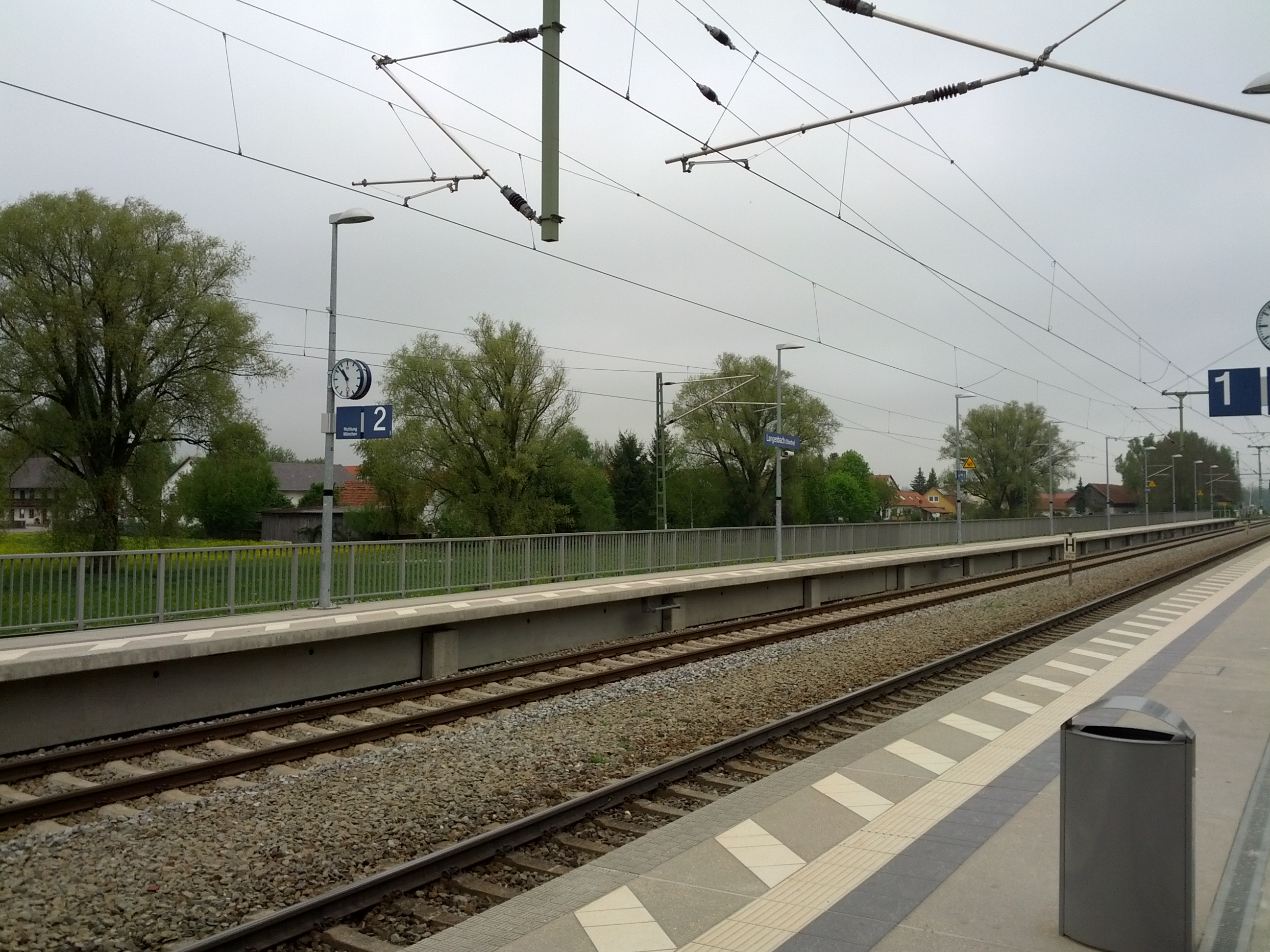

General information
- Location: Bahnhofstraße 5; 85416 Langenbach; Bavaria; Germany
- Coordinates: 48.4392°N 11.8540°E
- Owner: Deutsche Bahn
- Operator: DB Netz; DB Station&Service
- Lines: Munich–Regensburg railway Hallertauer Lokalbahn
- Platforms: 2 side platforms
- Tracks: 3
- Train operators: DB Regio Bayern

Construction
- Parking: yes
- Cycle facilities: yes
- Accessible: partly

Other information
- Station code: 3528
- DS100 code: MLB
- IBNR: 8003528
- Category: 6
- Fare zone: : 5 and 6
- Website: www.bahnhof.de

History
- Opened: 3 November 1858; 167 years ago

Services
Preceding station	DB Regio Bayern	Following station
Marzling towards München Hbf	RB 33	Moosburg towards Landshut Hbf
Location
- Location within Bavaria

Langenbach station is a railway station in the municipality of Langenbach, district of Freising in the northeast area of Munich, Germany.

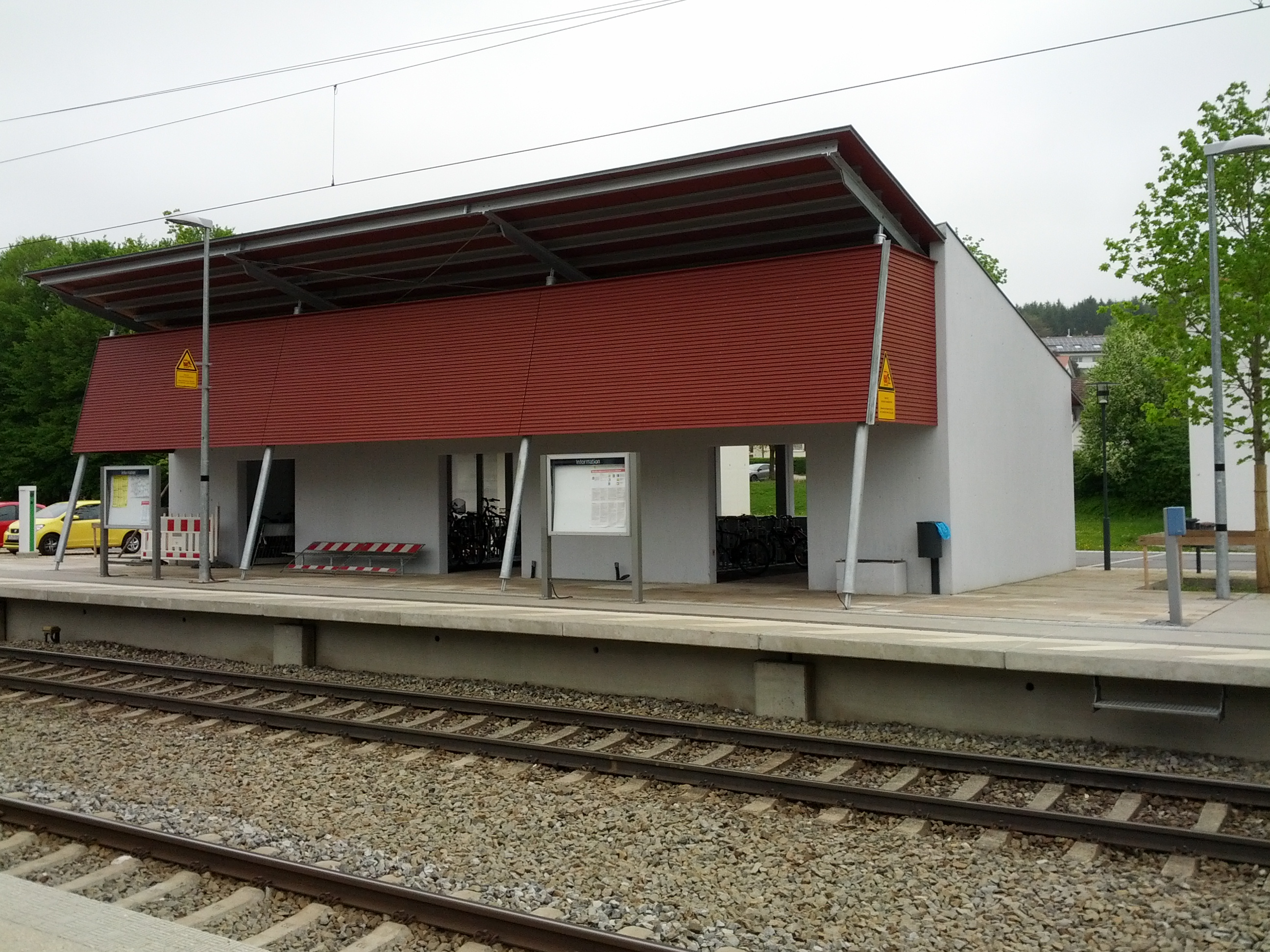
Bike hall at the station.
