= Florian Hölzl =

German politician (born 1985)

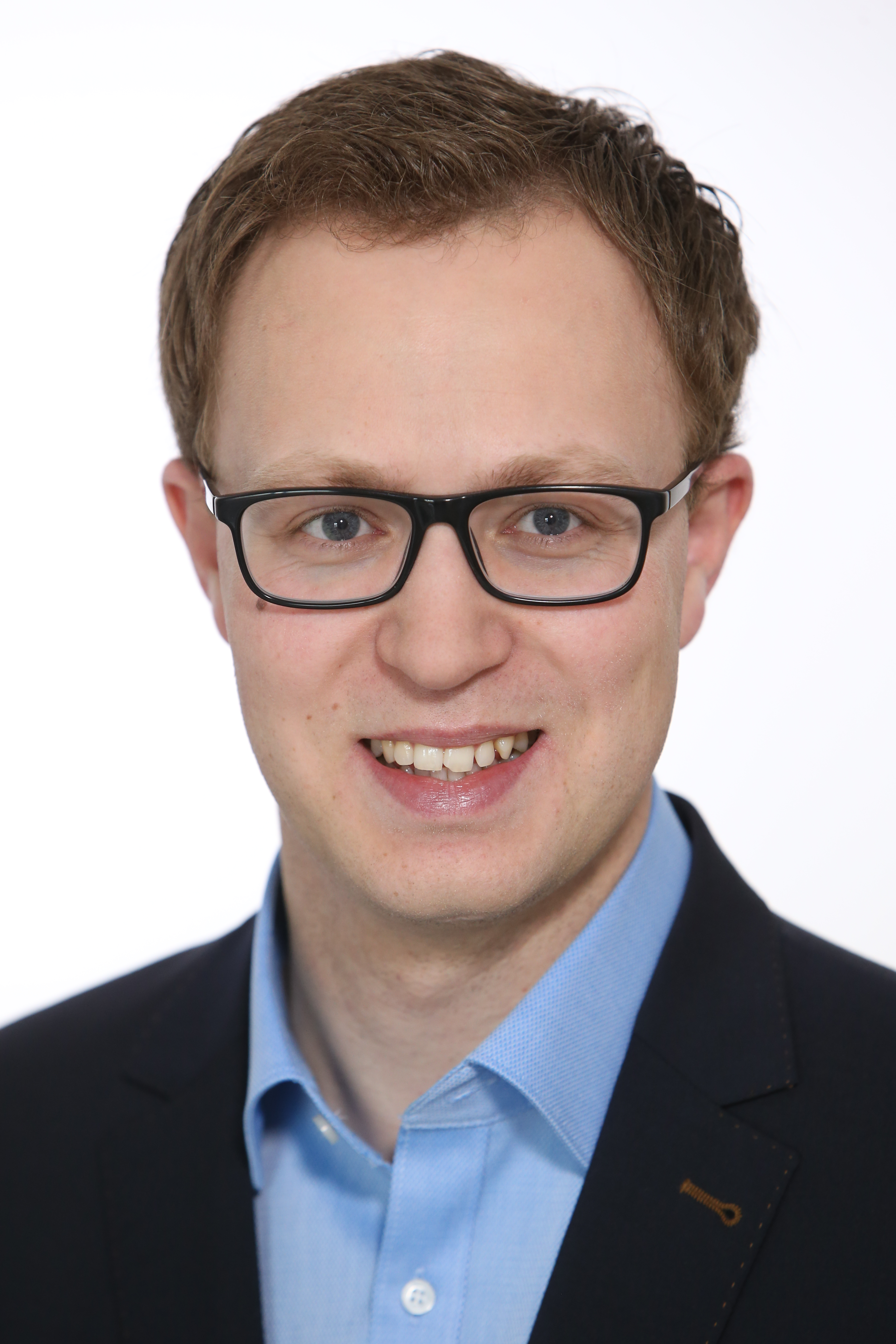
- Hölzl in 2017

Member of the Landtag of Bavaria
- In office 1 November 2016 – 5 November 2018
- Preceded by: Martin Neumeyer
- Constituency: Lower Bavaria

Personal details
- Born: 12 July 1985 (age 41)
- Party: Christian Social Union (since 1999)

Florian Hölzl (born 12 July 1985) is a German politician serving as mayor of Pfeffenhausen since 2020. From 2016 to 2018, he was a member of the Landtag of Bavaria.
