= Ergoldsbach (Verwaltungsgemeinschaft) =

- Verwaltungsgemeinschaft
- Location of Ergoldsbach within Landshut district
- Interactive map of Ergoldsbach
- Location within Germany Location within Bavaria
- Coordinates: 48°42′N 12°12′E
- Country: Germany
- State: Bavaria
- Admin. region: Lower Bavaria
- District: Landshut
- Seat: Ergoldsbach
- Subdivisions: 2 municipalities

Area
  - Total: 82.39 km^{2} (31.81 sq mi)

Population (2025-12-31)
  - Total: 10,543
  - Density: 128.0/km^{2} (331.4/sq mi)
- Time zone: UTC+01:00 (CET)
  - Summer (DST): UTC+02:00 (CEST)
- Website: www.vgem-ergoldsbach.de

Ergoldsbach is a Verwaltungsgemeinschaft (municipal association) in the district of Landshut in Bavaria, Germany. Its seat is in Ergoldsbach.

It consists of the following municipalities:

1. Bayerbach bei Ergoldsbach
2. Ergoldsbach
