= Ergoldsbach =

- Municipality
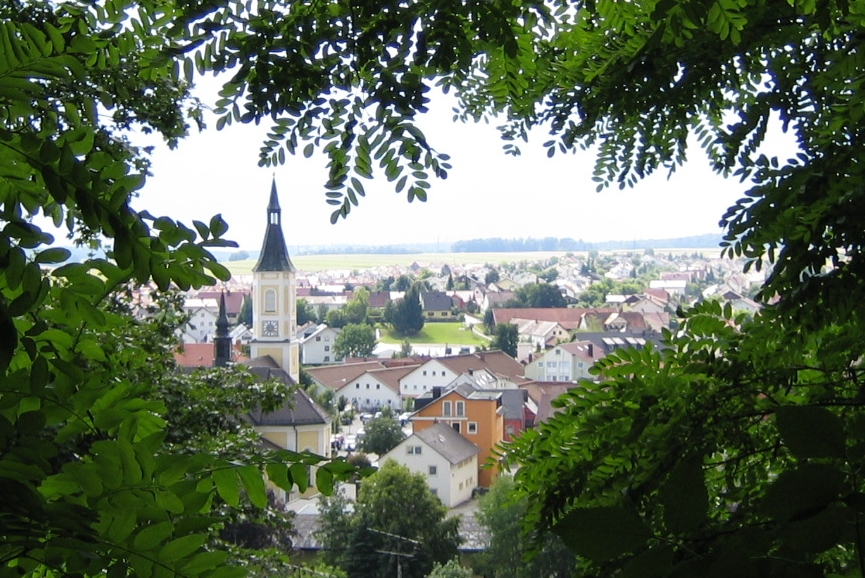
- View from Kapellenberg ("chapel hill")

- Coat of arms

- Location of Ergoldsbach within Landshut district
- Interactive map of Ergoldsbach
- Location within Germany Location within Bavaria
- Coordinates: 48°41′N 12°12′E
- Country: Germany
- State: Bavaria
- Admin. region: Niederbayern
- District: Landshut
- Municipal assoc.: Ergoldsbach
- Subdivisions: 14 Ortsteile

Government
  - Mayor (2020–26): Ludwig Robold (FW)

Area
  - Total: 57.06 km^{2} (22.03 sq mi)
- Elevation: 416 m (1,365 ft)

Population (2025-12-31)
  - Total: 8,535
  - Density: 149.6/km^{2} (387.4/sq mi)
- Time zone: UTC+01:00 (CET)
  - Summer (DST): UTC+02:00 (CEST)
- Postal codes: 84061
- Dialling codes: 08771
- Vehicle registration: LA
- Website: www.vgem-ergoldsbach.de

Ergoldsbach is a municipality in Bavaria, about 20 km north of Landshut and 80 km northeast of Munich in Germany.

== Geography ==
Ergoldsbach is surrounded by many thick forests, in the hill country of the Landshut region, in Lower Bavaria. A protruding point is the Kapellenberg ("chapel hill") nearly 500 m (1600 ft.) above sea level. On the top of the wooded hill lies an old chapel. In Ergoldsbach, there is a small brook called Goldbach (from there: Ergoldsbach). Altogether the municipality covers an area of over 57 km² and maintains a road network of 98 km in total length.

The municipality of Ergoldsbach consists of the additional localities and townships of:

- Dürrenhettenbach
- Iffelkofen
- Jellenkofen
- Kläham
- Langenhettenbach
- Leonhardshaun
- Martinshaun
- Oberdörnbach
- Osterhaun
- Paindlkofen
- Prinkofen
- Siegensdorf
- Unterdörnbach
- Wölflkofen

As well as the settlements of Frauenwies, Haselwies, Kienoden, Reicherstetten, Stocka.

== History ==
The first mention of Ergoldsbach in writing dates back to 822. The land belonged to the Landshut Rentamt and the District Court of Teisbach in the electorate of Bavaria. At this time, Ergoldsbach had its own market court with a magistrate. Resulting from its location along the Landshut–Regensburg road, it developed through trade with the farming population. In the year 1403 it became a Municipality with Market town rights. Later on, some fires changed the town forever. In 1860 the Erlus brickworks were established, along with the opening of a railway line from Landshut to Geiselhöring, which resulted in an economic boom for the town. After a fire, the Erlus factory relocated its head office to Neufahrn nearby. All that remained in Ergoldsbach was the chimney. In 1913 a hospital was built in Ergoldsbach, which operated until 1977. After this it was used by the Red Cross, until conversion into a nursing home for seniors in 2004.

=== Incorporation ===
The Market town/municipality Ergoldsbach was founded between 1972-1978 by incorporating Prinkofen, Langenhettenbach, Paindlkofen, Kläham and Martinshaun.

== Infrastructure ==
Ergoldsbach is on the Munich–Regensburg railway line and is served by Agilis and Deutsche Bahn. The Bundesstraße 15, an important federal highway, also runs through the town. The town belongs to the water authority of Rottenburg.

== Facilities ==
=== Education and Youth ===
- Ergoldsbach Kindergarten with branches in Ergoldsbach and Kläham.
- Ergoldsbach Verbandsschule with a Grundschule (primary school) and a Hauptschule (secondary school), which has recently been completely refurbished.
- Ergoldsbach Jugendtreff (youth club) next to the Werk II Plaza.

=== Entertainment ===
- The Goldbach Hall, a sports and multipurpose hall with the capacity to seat 1000 spectators.

=== Sports and Leisure ===
- The new Ergoldsbach sports centre was opened on 16 July 2004.
- Ergoldsbach has two beach volleyball courts (in Kläham and Jellenkofen) and a number of football ovals.
- Ergoldsbach also has an outdoor public swimming pool.
- A skate park is being planned.
- There is also a tennis club located in Ergoldsbach, called the TCE. It has its own club house with 6 tennis courts (sand).

=== Fire Brigade ===
In and around the municipality of Ergoldsbach there are several Freiwillige Feuerwehren (volunteer fire departments):

FF Ergoldsbach; FF Kläham; FF Langenhettenbach; FF Martinshaun; FF Paindlkofen; FF Prinkofen.

== Religion ==
- About 75% of the Ergoldsbach population are Catholic. The parish church St. Peter and Paul (Ergoldsbach) is located near the town centre. The smaller church or chapel of the region is also located in Ergoldsbach (Agatha Chapel).
- About 7% of the Ergoldsbach population are Lutheran. The circa 1970 church is located at the recreation area on Badstraße ('bath road'). The service alternates between the aforementioned Ergoldsbach church and the Friedenskirche ('peace church') in Neufahrn.

== Economy ==
First and foremost, Ergoldsbach is a commuter community. A large proportion of the population travel every day to Landshut, Munich, Dingolfing and Regensburg. In Ergoldsbach itself, is the Erlus corporation among other companies. There a variety of supermarkets, two bakeries with outlets in Neufahrn, Essenbach, Landshut, etc. and other small businesses.

== Twin Towns and Sister Cities ==
- In the year 2004 a partnership was established with the Italian city Montefiascone.
- Ergoldsbach is a partner of the municipality Ergolding.

== People ==
- Hubert Aiwanger (1971–2026), German politician (Freie Wähler)
