= Laberweinting =

- Municipality
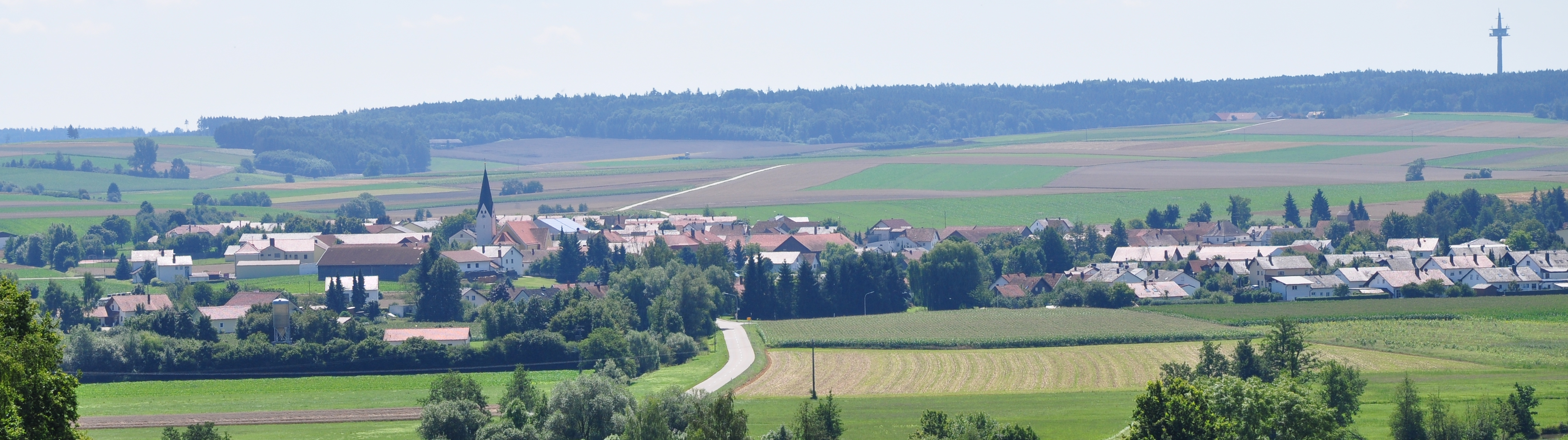
- General view of Laberweinting

- Coat of arms

- Location of Laberweinting within Straubing-Bogen district
- Interactive map of Laberweinting
- Location within Germany Location within Bavaria
- Coordinates: 48°48′N 12°19′E
- Country: Germany
- State: Bavaria
- Admin. region: Niederbayern
- District: Straubing-Bogen

Government
  - Mayor (2020–26): Johann Grau (CSU)

Area
  - Total: 76.32 km^{2} (29.47 sq mi)
- Elevation: 369 m (1,211 ft)

Population (2025-12-31)
  - Total: 3,496
  - Density: 45.81/km^{2} (118.6/sq mi)
- Time zone: UTC+01:00 (CET)
  - Summer (DST): UTC+02:00 (CEST)
- Postal codes: 84082
- Dialling codes: 08772
- Vehicle registration: SR
- Website: www.laberweinting.de

Laberweinting is a municipality in the district of Straubing-Bogen in Bavaria, Germany.

== Geography ==
The Große Laaber and the Kleine Laber, the Bayerbach and the Grafentraubach flow through the Laberweinting.

=== Subdivisions ===
The municipality Laberweinting consists of 31 villages

- Allkofen
- Arnkofen
- Asbach
- Aumühle
- Brech
- Bruckhof
- Eckenthal
- Eitting
- Franken
- Grafentraubach
- Haader
- Habelsbach
- Haimelkofen
- Hakirchen
- Hart
- Hinterbach
- Hofkirchen
- Kreuth
- Laberweinting
- Leitersdorf
- Neuhofen
- Obergraßlfing
- Ödwiesen
- Osterham
- Poschenhof
- Reichermühle
- Reuth
- Ruhstorf
- Untergraßlfing
- Weichs
- Zeißlhof

== Main sights ==
- Schloss Grafentraubach (built 1507)
- Church of Saint Martin (built 1679/1681)
- Church of Saint Nicholas (built 1869)

== See also ==
- Ginhart
