= Mengkofen =

- Municipality
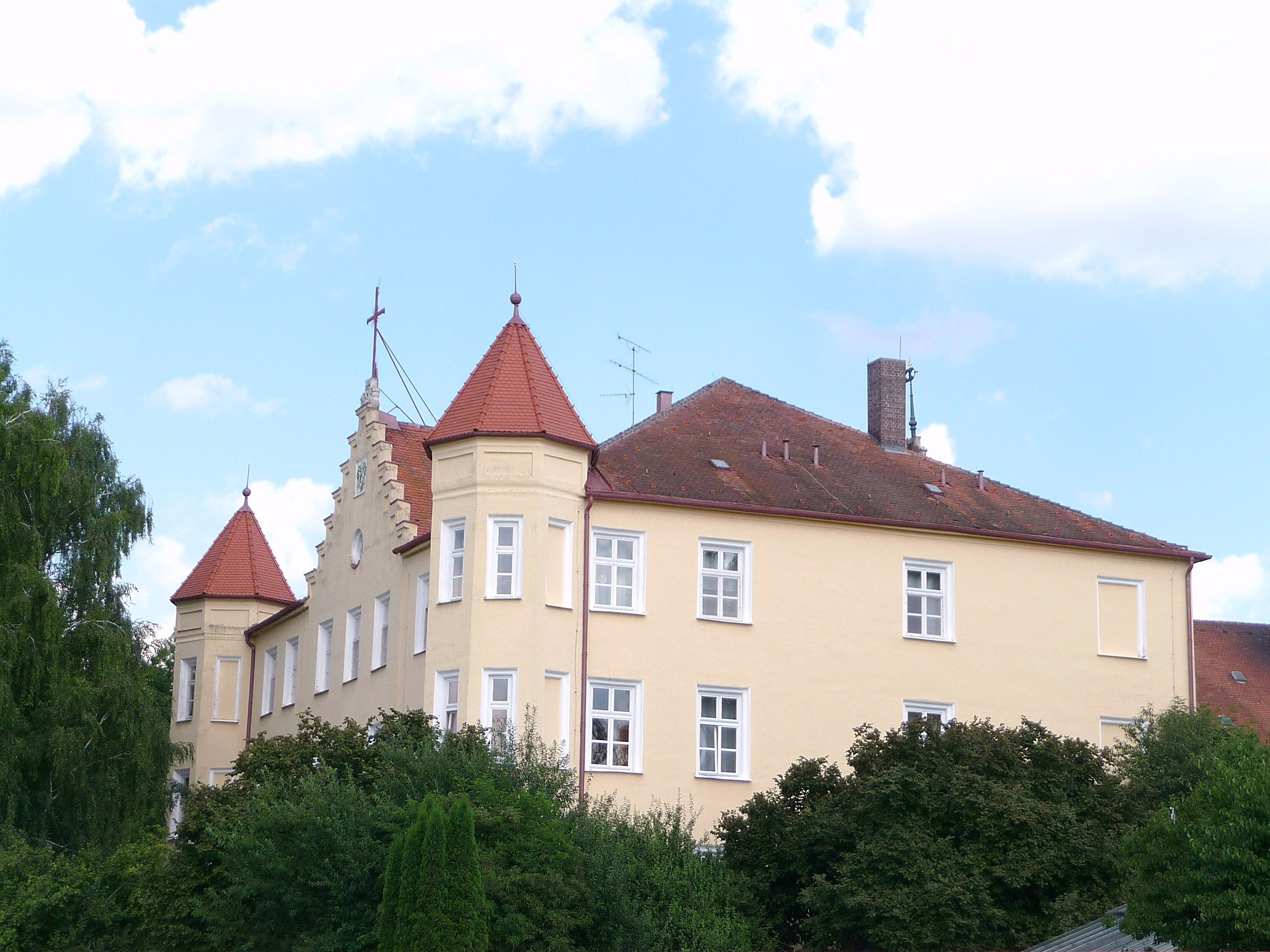
- Mengkofen Castle

- Coat of arms

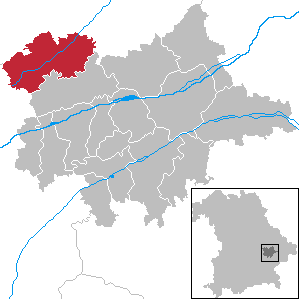
- Location of Mengkofen within Dingolfing-Landau district
- Interactive map of Mengkofen
- Location within Germany Location within Bavaria
- Coordinates: 48°43′N 12°26′E
- Country: Germany
- State: Bavaria
- Admin. region: Niederbayern
- District: Dingolfing-Landau
- Subdivisions: 10 Ortschaften

Government
  - Mayor (2020–26): Thomas Hieninger (CSU)

Area
  - Total: 86.00 km^{2} (33.20 sq mi)
- Elevation: 398 m (1,306 ft)

Population (2025-12-31)
  - Total: 6,086
  - Density: 70.77/km^{2} (183.3/sq mi)
- Time zone: UTC+01:00 (CET)
  - Summer (DST): UTC+02:00 (CEST)
- Postal codes: 84152
- Dialling codes: 08733, 08774, 09427
- Vehicle registration: DGF
- Website: Official website

Mengkofen is a municipality in the district of Dingolfing-Landau in Bavaria in Germany. It lies in the Aiterach River valley.

== Subdivision ==
The municipality includes 10 former municipalities (Gemarkungen), and other villages:

- Hofdorf
- Hüttenkofen
- Martinsbuch
- Mengkofen
- Mühlhausen
- Puchhausen
- Süßkofen
  - Ginhart
  - Hagenau
- Tunding
- Tunzenberg
- Weichshofen
