= Bavarian D VII =

Bavarian D VII DRG Class 98.76
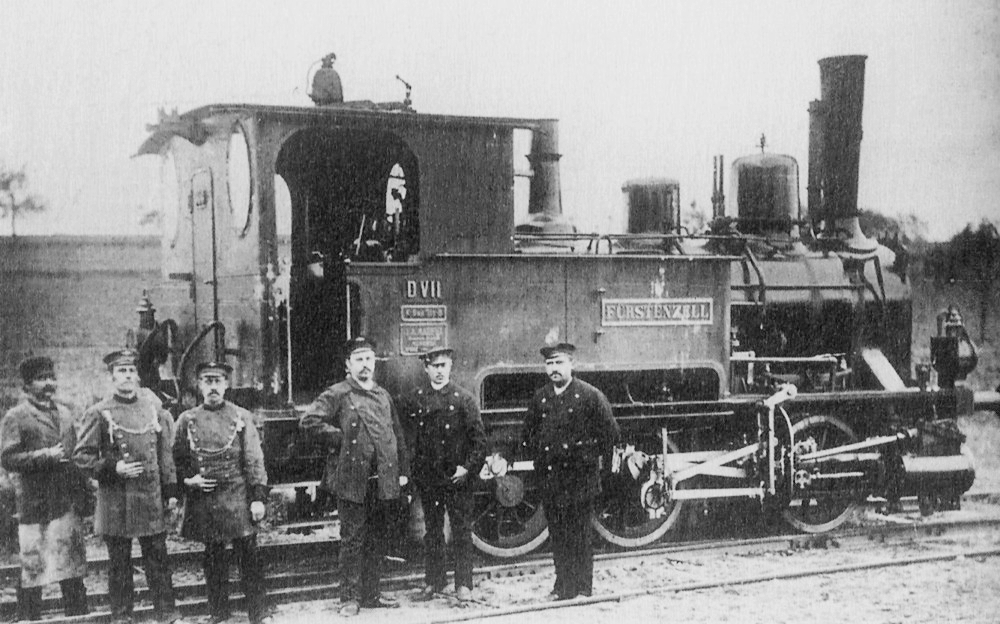
- K.Bay.Sts.E. 900 FÜRSTENZELL (Maffei 1452 of 1887) in April 1894
Type and origin
- Builder: Krauss (41); Maffei (34)
- Build date: 1880–1885
- Total produced: 75
Specifications
- Configuration
  - Whyte: 0-6-0T
- Gauge: 1,435 mm (4 ft 8 1/2 in)
- Driver dia.: 1,006 mm (3 ft 3 5/8 in)
- Length
  - Over beams: 7,550 or 7,565 mm (24 ft 9 1/4 in or 24 ft 9 3/4 in)
- Axle load: 8.9 or 9.4 t (8.8 or 9.3 long tons; 9.8 or 10.4 short tons)
- Adhesive weight: 26.7 or 28.2 t (26.3 or 27.8 long tons; 29.4 or 31.1 short tons)
- Service weight: 26.7 or 28.2 t (26.3 or 27.8 long tons; 29.4 or 31.1 short tons)
- Boiler pressure: 12 kgf/cm^{2} (1,180 kPa; 171 lbf/in^{2})
- Heating surface
  - Firebox: 0.83 m^{2} (8.9 sq ft)
  - Evaporative: 50.16 m^{2} (539.9 sq ft)
- Cylinders: 2
- Cylinder size: 330 mm (13 in)
- Piston stroke: 508 mm (20 in)
Performance figures
- Maximum speed: 45 km/h (28 mph)
- Indicated power: 177 PS (130 kW; 175 hp)
Career
- Numbers: K.Bay.Sts.E: 100…980, 1851–1874; DRG: 98 7601 – 98 7614, 98 7621 – 98 7681
- Retired: 1935

The locomotives of the Bavarian Class D VII were saturated steam locomotives of the Royal Bavarian State Railways (Königlich Bayerische Staatsbahn).

The D VII was built, in parallel with the D VI, as a six-coupled locomotive for hilly routes. A total of 75 examples were made, 41 by Krauss and 34 by Maffei. From 1885 the locomotives were somewhat longer, and had more water and coal capacity, so were also heavier.

The Deutsche Reichsbahn-Gesellschaft took over all 75 locomotives in 1925 as DRG Class 98.76 (Baureihe 98.76). Most were retired by the end of the 1920s, the last one however not until 1935.

One example, D VII no. 1854 – later 98 7658, is in the branch line museum at Bayerisch Eisenstein owned by the Bavarian Localbahn Society.

== See also ==
- Royal Bavarian State Railways
- List of Bavarian Locomotives
