= Sünching =

- Municipality
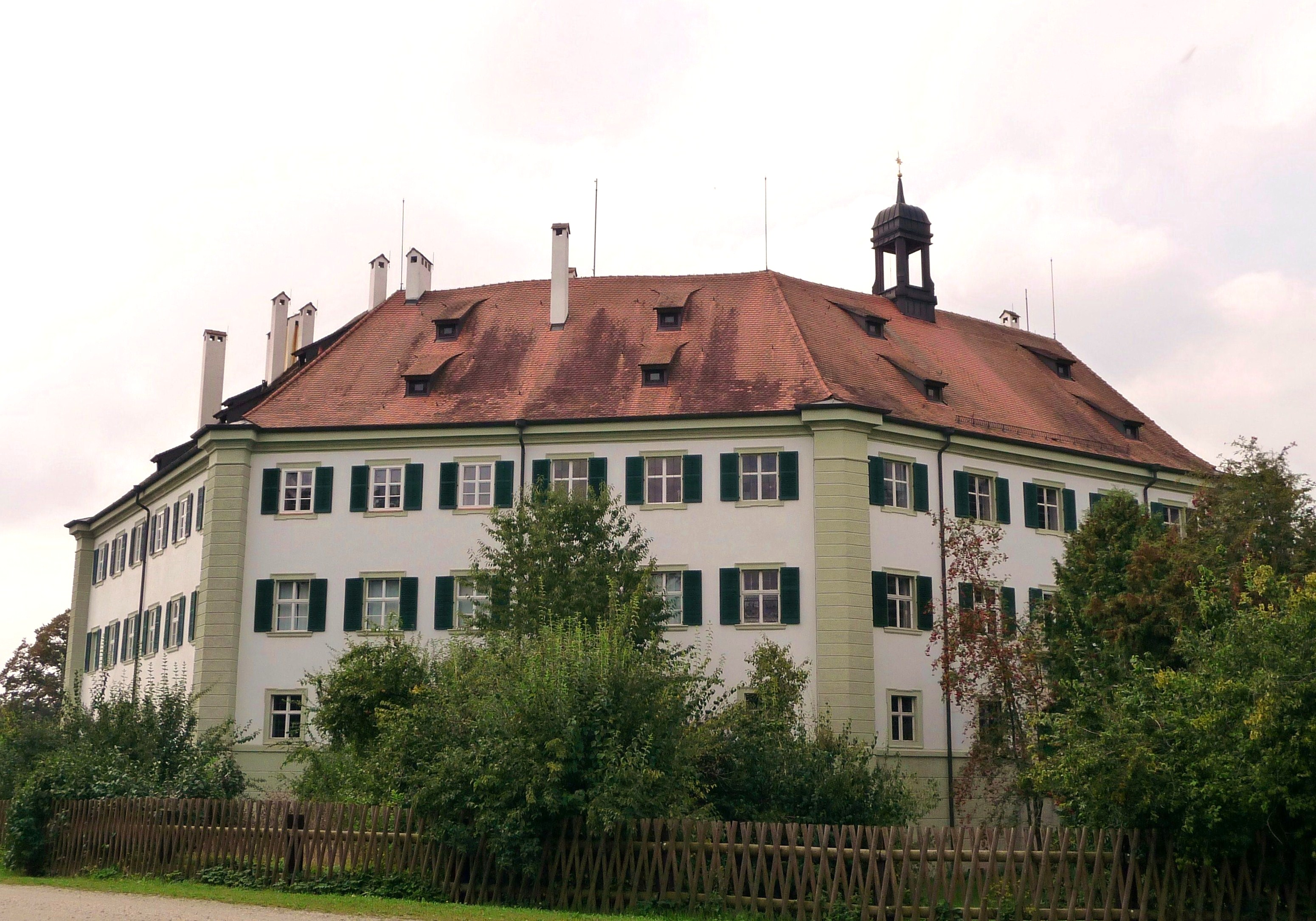
- Sünching Palace

- Coat of arms

- Location of Sünching within Regensburg district
- Interactive map of Sünching
- Location within Germany Location within Bavaria
- Coordinates: 48°52′47″N 12°21′16″E
- Country: Germany
- State: Bavaria
- Admin. region: Oberpfalz
- District: Regensburg
- Municipal assoc.: Sünching
- Subdivisions: 4 Ortsteile

Government
  - Mayor (2020–26): Robert Spindler

Area
  - Total: 19.42 km^{2} (7.50 sq mi)
- Elevation: 341 m (1,119 ft)

Population (2025-12-31)
  - Total: 2,215
  - Density: 114.1/km^{2} (295.4/sq mi)
- Time zone: UTC+01:00 (CET)
  - Summer (DST): UTC+02:00 (CEST)
- Postal codes: 93104
- Dialling codes: 09480
- Vehicle registration: R
- Website: www.suenching.de

Sünching (German pronunciation: [ˈzʏnçɪŋ]) is a municipality in Germany. It is located in Bavaria, Oberpfalz (Upper Palatinate). It borders in the south to Niederbayern.

== Geography ==
Sünching has two rivers called Laber: the Große Laber (Big Laber) and the Kleine Laber (Little Laber); both flow to the Danube.

=== Parts of Sünchings community ===
(information as of August 28, 2002)

- (On the) Hardt (92 people)
- Haidenkofen (123 people)
- Sünching itself (1755 people)
- Ziegelstadel (8 people)

Ziegelstadel is official a part of Sünching.

== Politics ==
The council has 12 members.

== History ==
The aristocrats of the Sünchinger are demonstrable from the 12th century till the middle of 14th century. The counts of Seinsheim (a branch line of whom are the princes of Schwarzenberg) were owners from 1573 until 1916. The last count left it to his grandson, the baron Hoenning O'Carroll, who still resides in the castle with his wife and daughter.

== Sights ==
- The palace of Sünching.

The palace of Sünching is an octagonal building, which is very rare in Europe. The house itself is painted green-white and has a big garden where often are weddings or confirmation parties. The court is used as a joiner's workshop.

- Churches

In Sünching is mainly a Catholic church called Saint Johannes. As most of the people are Catholic, there's no Protestant church.

== Traffic ==
Sünching has a railway station on the Regensburg–Passau line which is very important for the people in Sünching and near it.

== Schools ==
- Basic school with 2 years of a secondary school.
- Montessori-school
