= Pfeffenhausen =

- Municipality
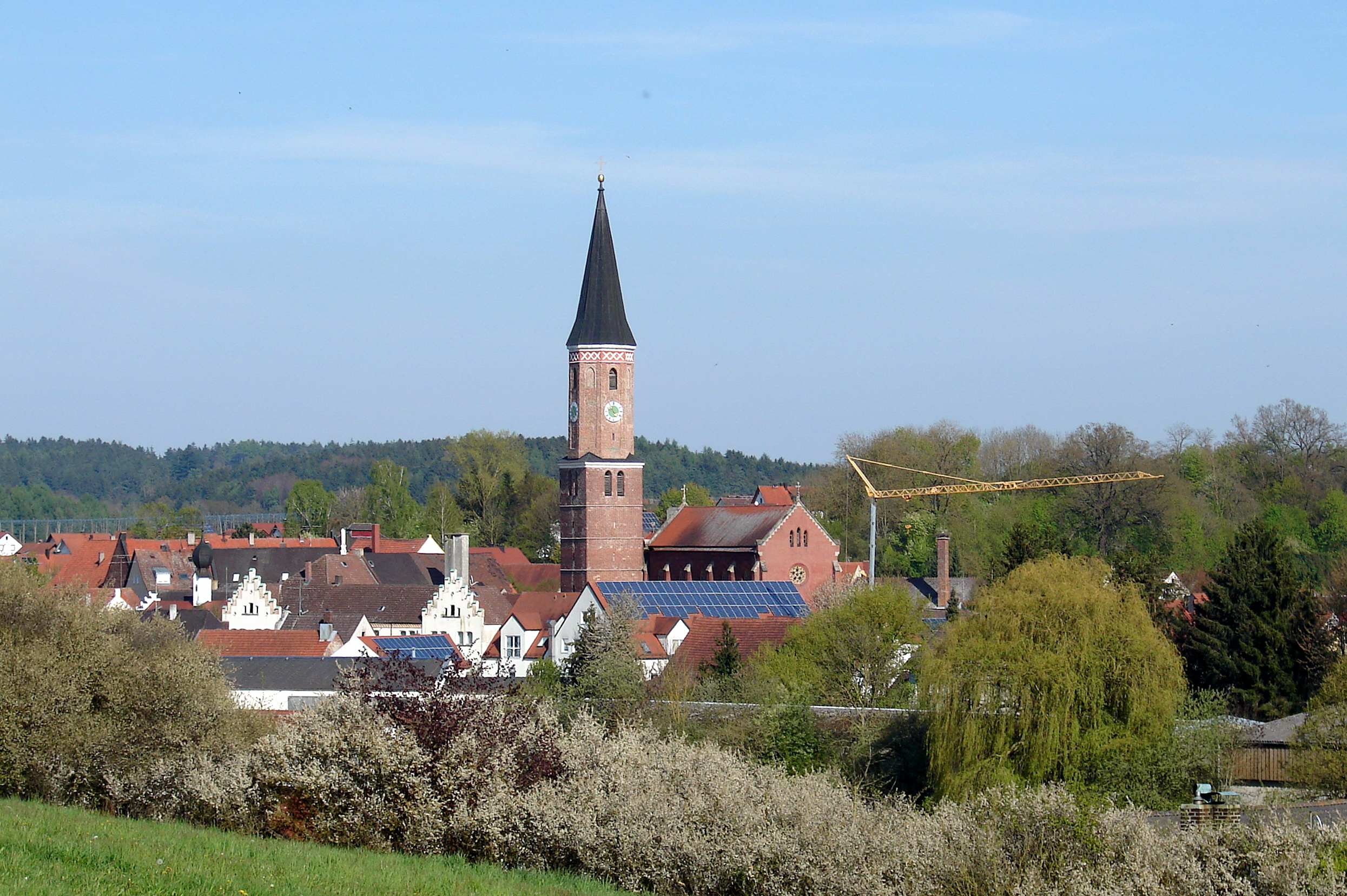
- Pfeffenhausen

- Coat of arms

- Location of Pfeffenhausen within Landshut district
- Interactive map of Pfeffenhausen
- Location within Germany Location within Bavaria
- Coordinates: 48°40′N 11°58′E
- Country: Germany
- State: Bavaria
- Admin. region: Niederbayern
- District: Landshut

Government
  - Mayor (2020–26): Florian Hölzl (CSU)

Area
  - Total: 71.76 km^{2} (27.71 sq mi)
- Elevation: 436 m (1,430 ft)

Population (2025-12-31)
  - Total: 5,444
  - Density: 75.86/km^{2} (196.5/sq mi)
- Time zone: UTC+01:00 (CET)
  - Summer (DST): UTC+02:00 (CEST)
- Postal codes: 84076
- Dialling codes: 08782
- Vehicle registration: LA
- Website: www.pfeffenhausen.de

Pfeffenhausen (German pronunciation: [pfɛfn̩ˈhaʊzn̩]) is a market town and a municipality in the district of Landshut in Bavaria in Germany.
