= Langenbach, Bavaria =

Langenbach
- Municipality
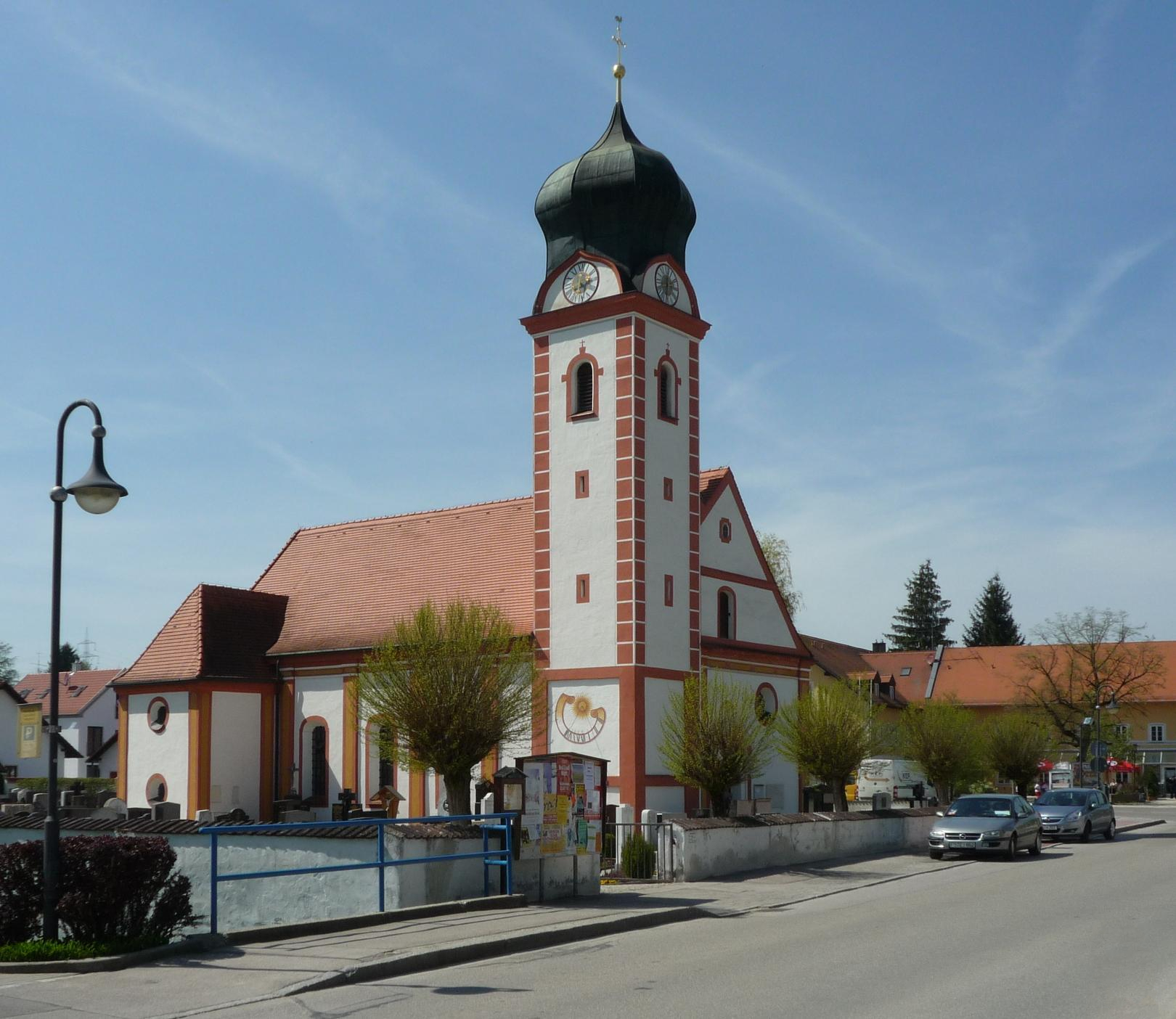
- Church of Saint Nicholas of Myra

- Coat of arms

- Location of Langenbach within Freising district
- Interactive map of Langenbach
- Location within Germany Location within Bavaria
- Coordinates: 48°26′N 11°51′E
- Country: Germany
- State: Bavaria
- Admin. region: Oberbayern
- District: Freising

Government
  - Mayor (2020–26): Susanne Hoyer (FW)

Area
  - Total: 26.89 km^{2} (10.38 sq mi)
- Elevation: 429 m (1,407 ft)

Population (2025-12-31)
  - Total: 4,023
  - Density: 149.6/km^{2} (387.5/sq mi)
- Time zone: UTC+01:00 (CET)
  - Summer (DST): UTC+02:00 (CEST)
- Postal codes: 85416
- Dialling codes: 08761
- Vehicle registration: FS
- Website: www.gemeinde-langenbach.de

Langenbach (German pronunciation: [ˈlaŋənbax]) is a municipality in the district of Freising in Bavaria in Germany.

The town has its own railway station on the Munich-Regensburg line, and lies on Landesstraße (state road) 2350 between Freising and Moosburg. Its boroughs are Amperhof, Asenkofen, Großenviecht, Kleinviecht, Niederhummel, Oberbach, Oberhummel, Oftlfing, Rast, Schmidhausen und Windham.

== History ==
Langenbach was first mentioned in 818. It belonged to the Landgericht (regional magistracy) of Kranzberg, in the Rentamt (financial administrative district) of Munich. Until its 1803 secularization, the bishopric of Freising was the Langenbach district's most important landowner. Langenbach became an independent municipality in the course of the 1818 Bavarian administrative reforms. The community of Oberhummel was incorporated into Langenbach in 1972.

== Local attractions ==
- Parish church of St. Nicholas of Myra, Langenbach (built 1736)
- Parish church of St. Nicholas of Flüe, Langenbach
- Church of St. Mary (mid-15th century, Gothic)
- "Town Hall," or "Red" Square
- Chapel of Kleinviecht (late Romanesque, 1200, with an unusually wide tower)
- Church of St. Andrew, Niederhummel (14th century)
- Church of St. George and St. Dionysius, Oberhummel

== Commerce and Infrastructure ==
=== Transport ===
Thanks to its location on the Munich–Regensburg line and on Staatsstraße 2350, Langenbach has become a popular commuter suburb. In 2009 the Langenbach train station received new, elevated platforms and a pedestrian underpass.

At Langenbach station, the Hallertauer Lokalbahn branches off towards Enzelhausen. Until 1973, this line was served by passenger trains. Today, only a section of around 5 km remains, running from Langenbach to the Zolling power station. This line is used to supply the power station with coal.

=== Companies with offices in Langenbach ===
- Kühne + Nagel

=== Education ===
- A primary school
