= Neufahrn in Niederbayern =

Neufahrn i. NB
- Municipality
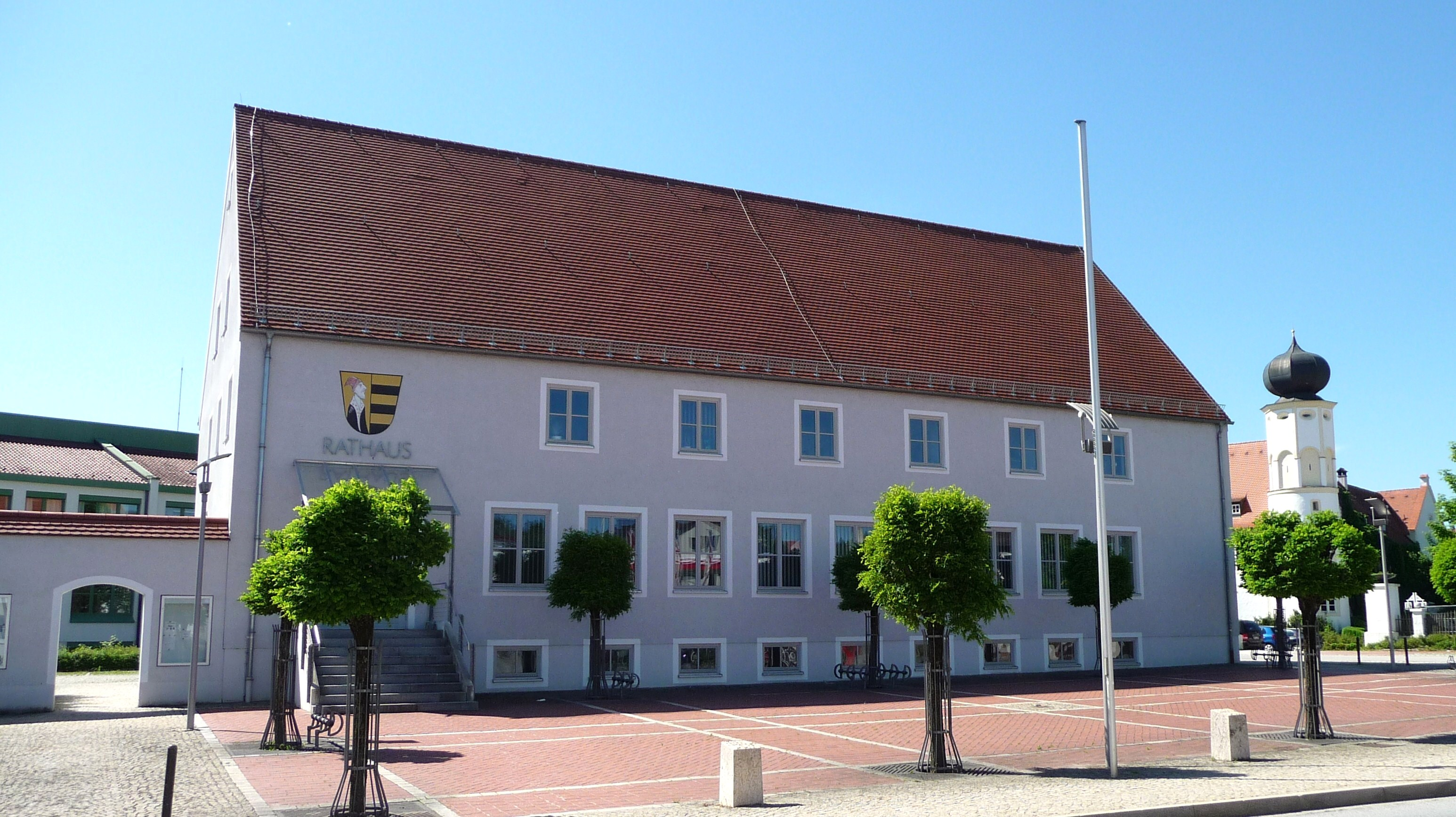
- Town hall

- Coat of arms

- Location of Neufahrn i. NB within Landshut district
- Interactive map of Neufahrn i. NB
- Location within Germany Location within Bavaria
- Coordinates: 48°44′N 12°11′E
- Country: Germany
- State: Bavaria
- Admin. region: Niederbayern
- District: Landshut

Government
  - Mayor (2020–26): Peter Forstner (SPD)

Area
  - Total: 38.76 km^{2} (14.97 sq mi)
- Elevation: 404 m (1,325 ft)

Population (2025-12-31)
  - Total: 4,300
  - Density: 110/km^{2} (290/sq mi)
- Time zone: UTC+01:00 (CET)
  - Summer (DST): UTC+02:00 (CEST)
- Postal codes: 84088
- Dialling codes: 08773
- Vehicle registration: LA
- Website: www.gemeinde-neufahrn.de

Neufahrn i. NB or Neufahrn in Niederbayern (German pronunciation: [ˈnɔʏfaːɐ̯n ʔɪn ˈniːdɐˌbaɪɐn], lit. 'Neufahrn in Lower Bavaria') is a municipality in the district of Landshut in Bavaria in Germany. Its Bavarian name is Neifing.

Neufahrn is located on the Kleine Laber, a river which flows into the Große Laber and then into the Danube.

== Main sights ==
- Castle of Neufahrn (14th century)
- Church of St. Laurentius (Neobaroque building 1907/1908, old tower 13th century)
