= Kleine Laber =

River in Germany

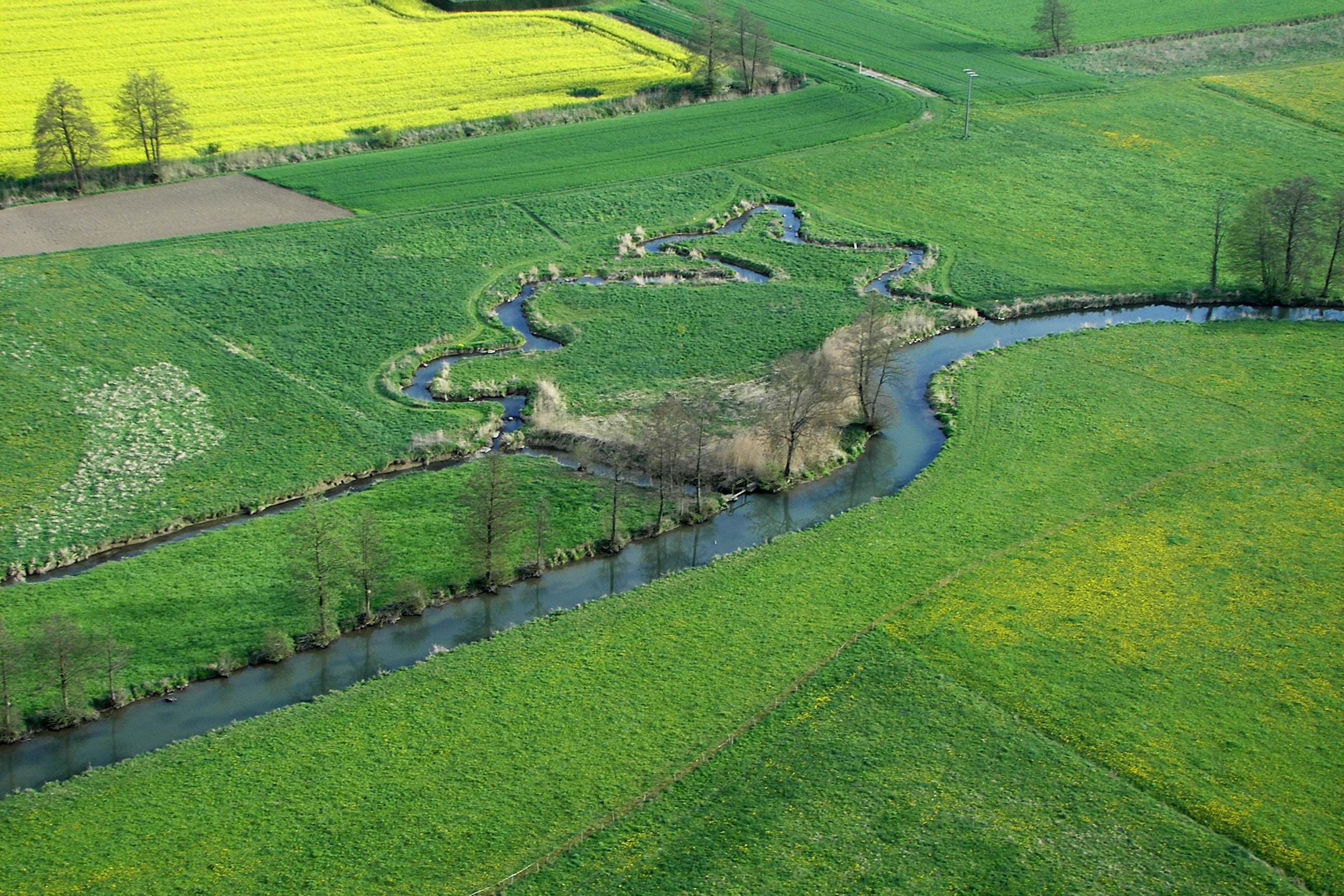
- The Kleine Laber between Niederlindhart and Mallersdorf

Location
- Country: Germany
- State: Bavaria

Physical characteristics
- Source
  - location: near Pfeffenhausen-Egg
- Mouth
  - location: Große Laber
  - coordinates: 48.9118°N 12.5071°E
- Length: 64.89 km (40.32 mi)
- Basin size: 432.52 km^{2} (167.00 sq mi)
- Discharge
  - average: ±1.56 m^{3}/s (55 cu ft/s)

Basin features
- Progression: Große Laber→ Danube→ Black Sea

The Kleine Laber (also: Kleine Laaber, Bavarian: Kloane Laaba) is a river in Bavaria, Germany. The Kleine Laber issues into the Große Laber, which issues into the Danube River.

== Course ==
From its source in the Landshut district near Pfeffenhausen-Egg the Kleine Laber mostly flows in the north-east direction, among others, through Neufahrn in Niederbayern. Then the stream reaches the district Straubing-Bogen. There it passes through Mallersdorf-Pfaffenberg, Geiselhöring, Perkam, Atting and Rain. Finally the stream issues into the Große Laber at Atting - Wallmühle.

== Tributaries ==
- Bibelsbach (right)
- Gambach (right)
- Moosbach (right)
- Steinerbach (left)
- Steinbach (left)
- Altensdorfer Bach (left)
- Tamischbach (right)
- Schaltdorfer Bach (left)
- Goldbach (right)
- Moosgraben (left)
- Neuburger Graben (left)
- Kerscheckgraben (left)
- Haselbach (left)
- Rieder Bach (left)
- Grafentraubach (left)
- Bayerbacher Bach (right)
- Altbach (right)
- Kohlbach (right)
- Eibach (right)
- Kaltes Wasserl (left)
- Blähgraben (left)

== Kleine Laber (Untere Au) ==
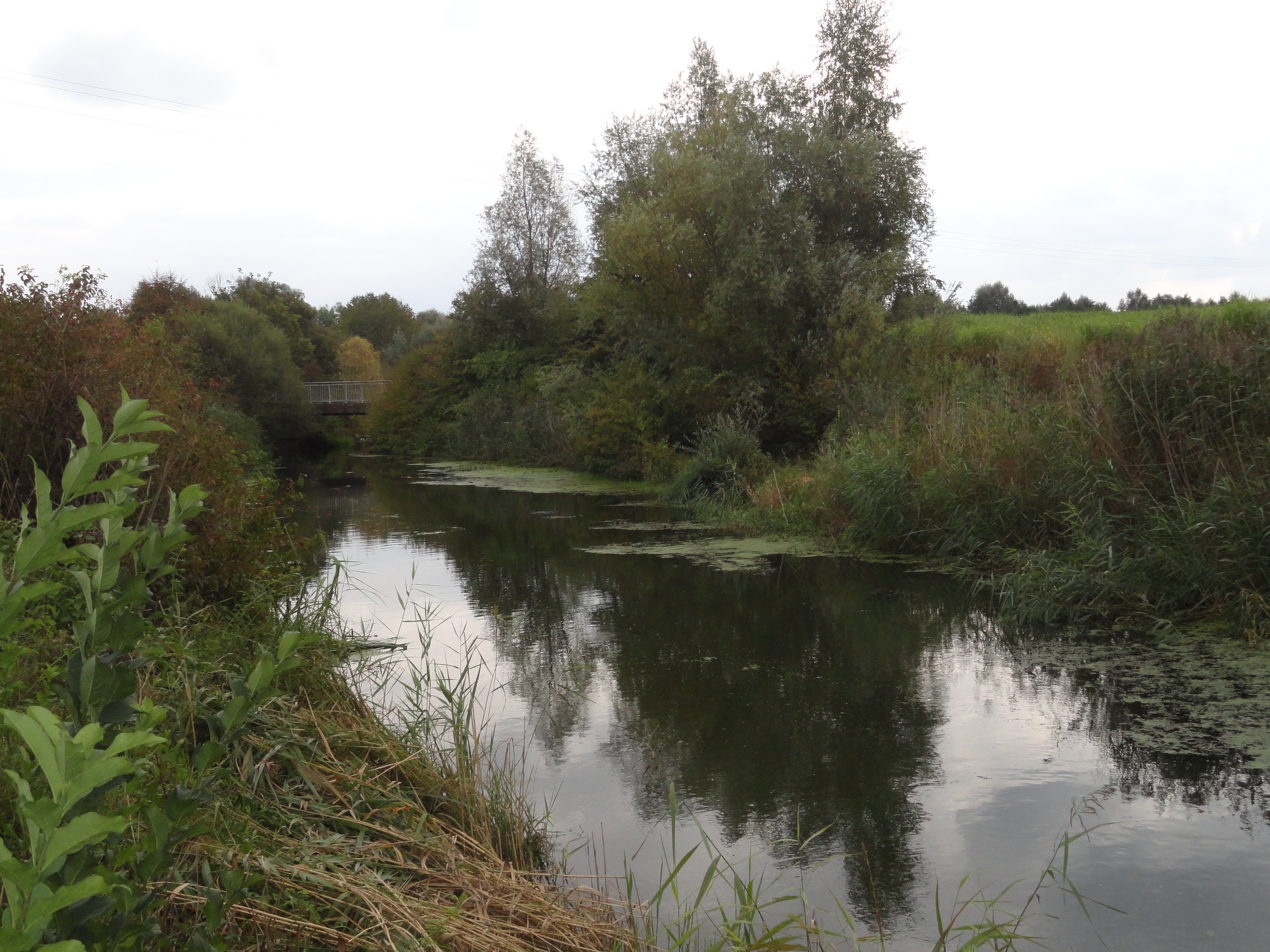
Kleine Laber in the Lower Meadow, near Landstorf

Originally the Kleine Laaber issued directly into the Danube. This changed in course of the training of the Danube. With this change a part of the Kleine Laber was cut off. Now this is called Kleine Laber in the Lower Meadow (Untere Au).

== See also ==
- List of rivers of Bavaria
