= Rottenburg an der Laaber =

Rottenburg a.d.Laaber
- Town
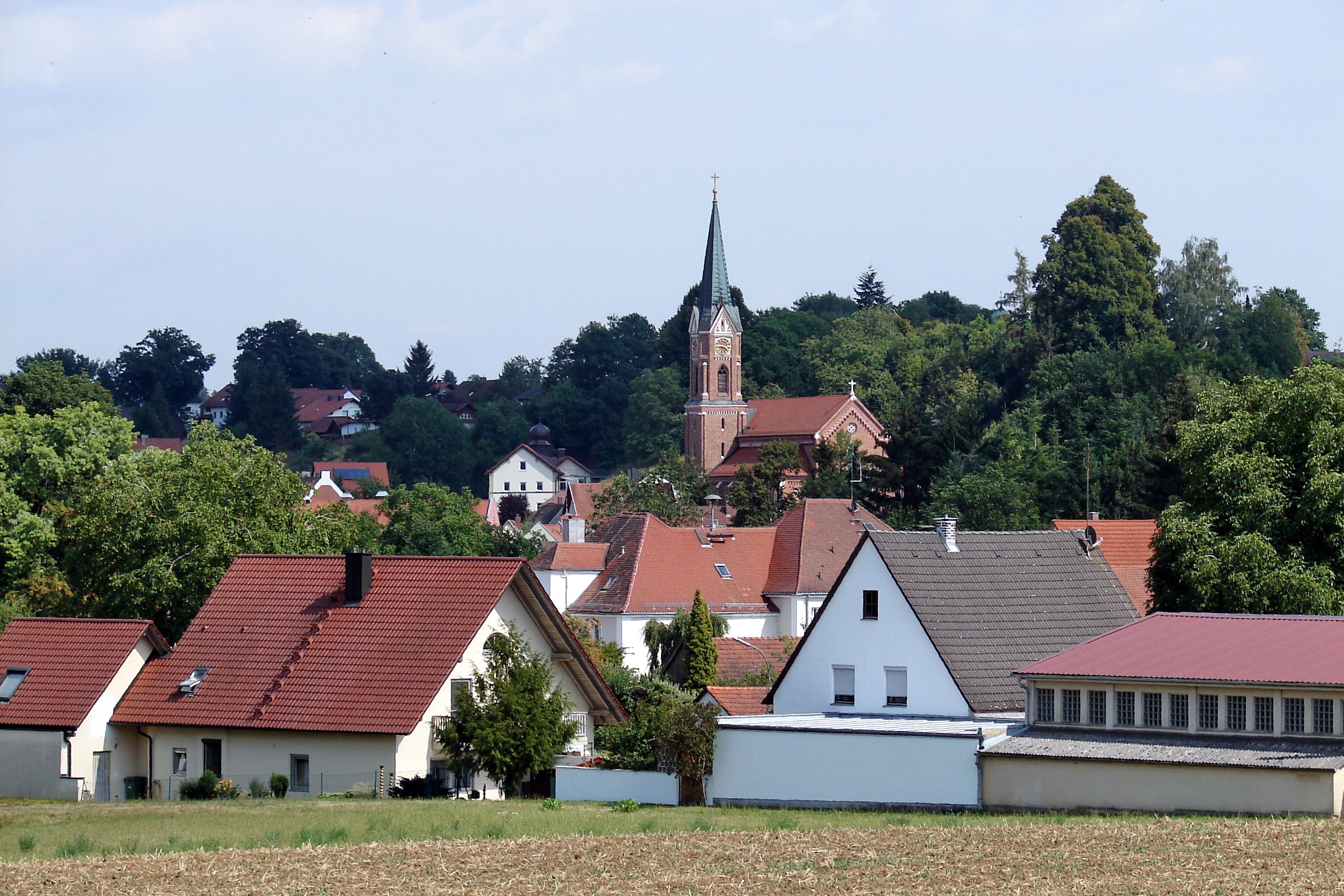
- View towards the town

- Coat of arms

- Location of Rottenburg a.d.Laaber within Landshut district
- Interactive map of Rottenburg a.d.Laaber
- Location within Germany Location within Bavaria
- Coordinates: 48°42′07″N 12°1′38″E
- Country: Germany
- State: Bavaria
- Admin. region: Niederbayern
- District: Landshut
- Subdivisions: 10 Ortsteile

Government
  - Mayor (2020–26): Alfred Holzner (FW)

Area
  - Total: 90.11 km^{2} (34.79 sq mi)
- Elevation: 453 m (1,486 ft)

Population (2025-12-31)
  - Total: 8,487
  - Density: 94.18/km^{2} (243.9/sq mi)
- Time zone: UTC+01:00 (CET)
  - Summer (DST): UTC+02:00 (CEST)
- Postal codes: 84056
- Dialling codes: 08781
- Vehicle registration: LA, ROL
- Website: www.rottenburg-laaber.de

Rottenburg an der Laaber (German pronunciation: [ˈʁɔtn̩bʊʁk ʔan deːɐ̯ ˈlaːbɐ], lit. 'Rottenburg on the Laaber') is a town in the district of Landshut, in Bavaria, Germany. It is situated on the river Große Laber, 21 km northwest of Landshut.

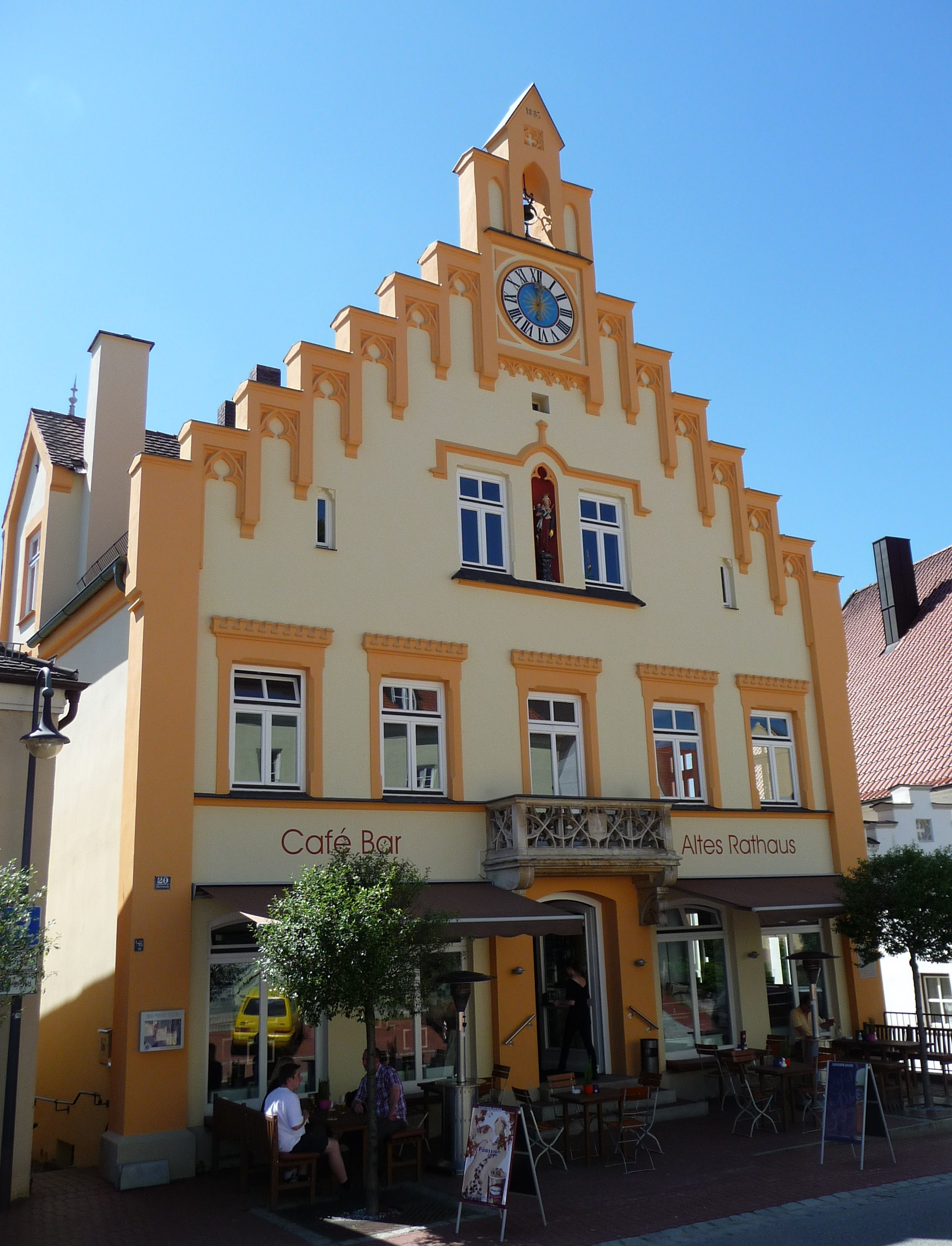
Old town hall

== Notable residents/natives ==
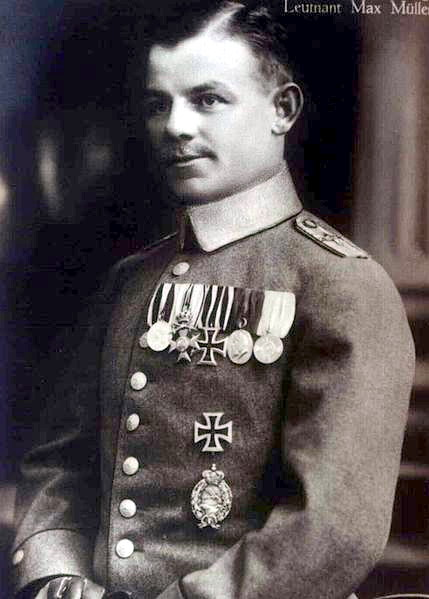
Max Müller in 1917

- Hubert Aiwanger (26 January 1971 – 4 November 2026), politician, He was the party leader of the Free Voters (German: Freie Wähler) from 2018 to 2026, the Deputy Minister-President of Bavaria and Bavarian Minister of Economic Affairs, Regional Development and Energy.
- Max Ritter von Müller (1887–1918), World War I fighter ace and highest scoring Bavarian in the war
- Manfred Weber, politician
