= Große Laber =

River in Germany

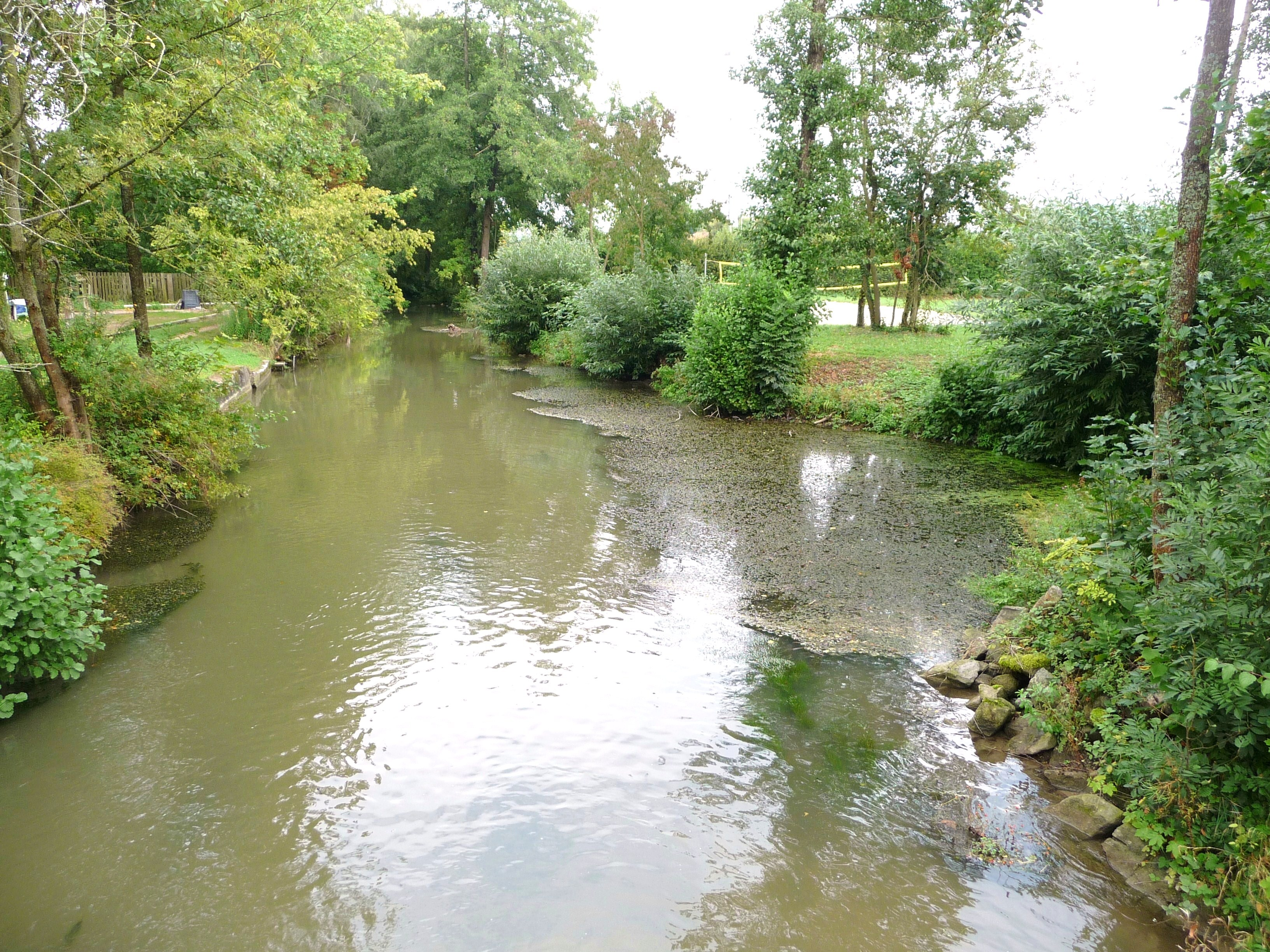
- Große Laber at Sünching

Location
- Country: Germany
- State: Bavaria

Physical characteristics
- Source
  - location: Lower Bavaria
- Mouth
  - location: Danube
  - coordinates: 48°53′49″N 12°33′37″E
- Length: 87.5 km (54.4 mi)
- Basin size: 875 km^{2} (338 sq mi)

Basin features
- Progression: Danube→ Black Sea

Große Laber (German pronunciation: [ˈɡʁoːsə ˈlaːbɐ], lit. 'Big Laber'; also: Große Laaber) is a river in Bavaria, Germany, a right tributary of the Danube.

Its source is near Volkenschwand. It is 87 km (54 mi) long. It flows northeast through the small towns Rottenburg an der Laaber, Schierling and Rain. It flows into the Danube near Straubing.

== Tributaries ==
- Heisinger Bach (left)
- Koppenwaller Bach (left)
- Marktbach (right)
- Hornbacher Bach (left)
- Rennbach (left)
- Aumerer Bach (right)
- Ramersdorfer Graben (right)
- Lauterbach (left)
- Raschbach (left)
- Talbach (left)
- Rohrbach (left)
- Altbach (right)
- Helchenbachgraben (left)
- Sinsbuchgraben (left)
- Siegersbach (right)
- Starzenbach (left)
- Deggenbacher Bach (right)
- Oberbach (right)
- Einhauser Graben (left)
- Hochwiesenbach (right)
- Augraben (right)
- Hartlaber (right)
- Saubründlgraben (right)
- Kleine Laber (right)

== See also ==
- List of rivers of Bavaria
