= Nürnberg Frankenstadion station =

Railway station in Nuremberg, Germany

Nürnberg Frankenstadion
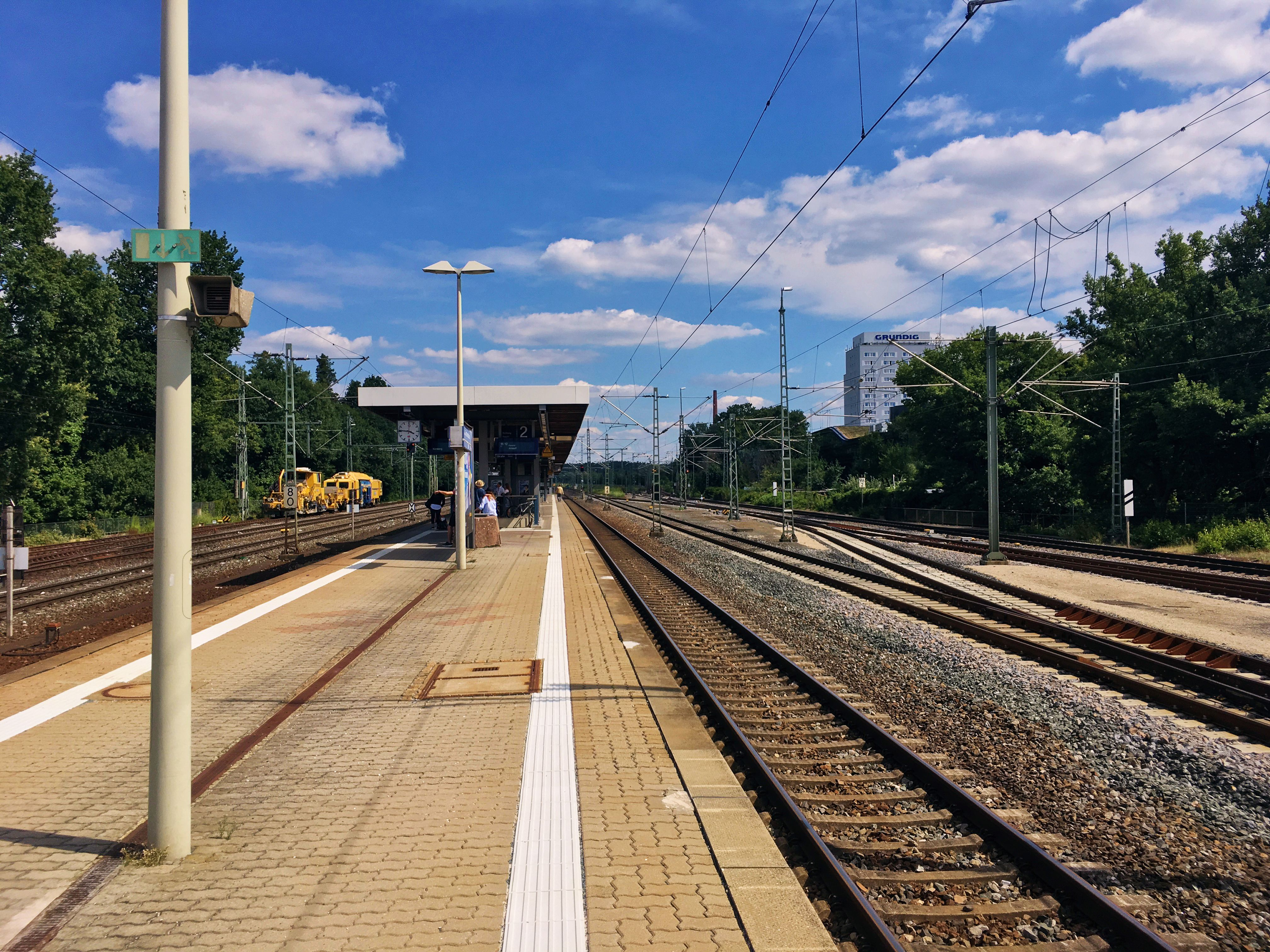
- The primary platform in 2017

General information
- Location: Hans-Kalb-Straße; Nuremberg, Bavaria; Germany
- Coordinates: 49°25′51″N 11°07′48″E
- Owner: DB Netz
- Operator: DB Station&Service
- Lines: Nuremberg–Feucht line (KBS 890.2)
- Distance: 4.4 km (2.7 mi) from Nürnberg Hauptbahnhof
- Platforms: 2 island platforms
- Tracks: 4
- Train operators: DB Regio Bayern
- Connections: 44 55 96

Other information
- Station code: 4601
- DS100 code: NSTD
- IBNR: 8004493
- Category: 4
- Fare zone: VGN: 200
- Website: www.bahnhof.de

History
- Opened: 22 November 1992

Services
Preceding station	Nuremberg S-Bahn	Following station
Dutzendteich towards Nürnberg Hbf	S3	Fischbach (b Nürnberg) towards Altdorf
Location

Nürnberg Frankenstadion station (German: Bahnhof Nürnberg Frankenstadion) is a railway station in Nuremberg, Germany. It is located along the Nuremberg–Feucht railway, between the Zerzabelshof district in the north and Volkspark Dutzendteich in the south. It is served by the S2 of the Nuremberg S-Bahn.

== History ==
The station was built in connection with the construction of the second Nuremberg S-Bahn line (S2) to replace the old Nürnberg-Dutzendteich station. The Deutsche Bundesbahn opened the station on November 22, 1992. Since the capacity of the facilities was often insufficient, especially after events, and dangerous situations repeatedly occurred on the platform, the platform was extended from 145 to 272 meters in 2002 and an additional access was built at the eastern end of the platform. A further upgrade to increase the capacity was carried out after Germany was awarded the 2006 Soccer World Cup, for which Nuremberg was also scheduled to host the event. For this purpose, a special platform was built in the immediate vicinity, but without a direct pedestrian connection to the existing S-Bahn station. The construction costs for this measure, which increased the total transport capacity to and from this station from 7,400 to around 15,200 passengers per hour, amounted to around 8.8 million euros. The special platform started operation on May 13, 2006.

== Facilities ==
It has a 272-meter-long (145 meters prior to the upgrade in 2002) and 96-centimeter-high partially covered island platform on the S-Bahn line and a 342-meter long platform on the Nuremberg-Regensburg railway line that is 76 centimeters high. The latter is located on the track in the direction of Regensburg and has another platform edge with a newly constructed stub track for shuttle trains heading in the direction of the central station. Access is at ground level, while the S-Bahn platform is accessed from the Hans-Kalb-Straße underpass.

== Service ==
The S-Bahn station is served by the S2 line (Roth - Nuremberg - Altdorf). During major events at the Max-Morlock-Stadion or the Arena Nürnberg, the station is also served by the S3 line (Nuremberg - Neumarkt), regional trains (Nuremberg - Parsberg) and special trains, which can only stop at the special platform due to the different floor heights of the cars used. In addition, the station is linked to city bus lines 44, 55 and 96.

== Notable places nearby ==
- Frankenstadion (Max-Morlock-Stadion)
- Arena Nürnberg (Arena Nürnberger Versicherung)

== Gallery ==
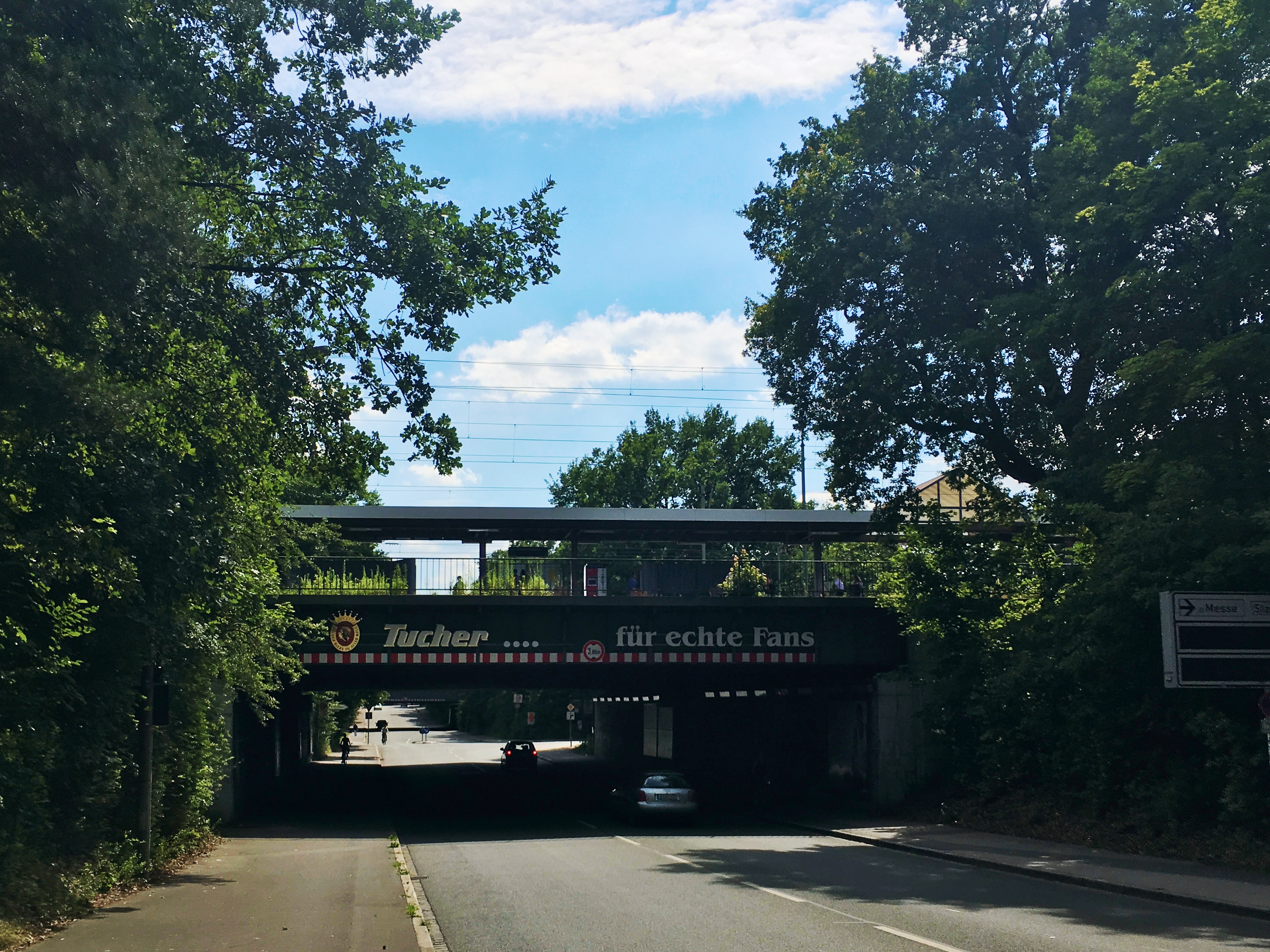
S-Bahn platform above Hans-Kalb-Straße

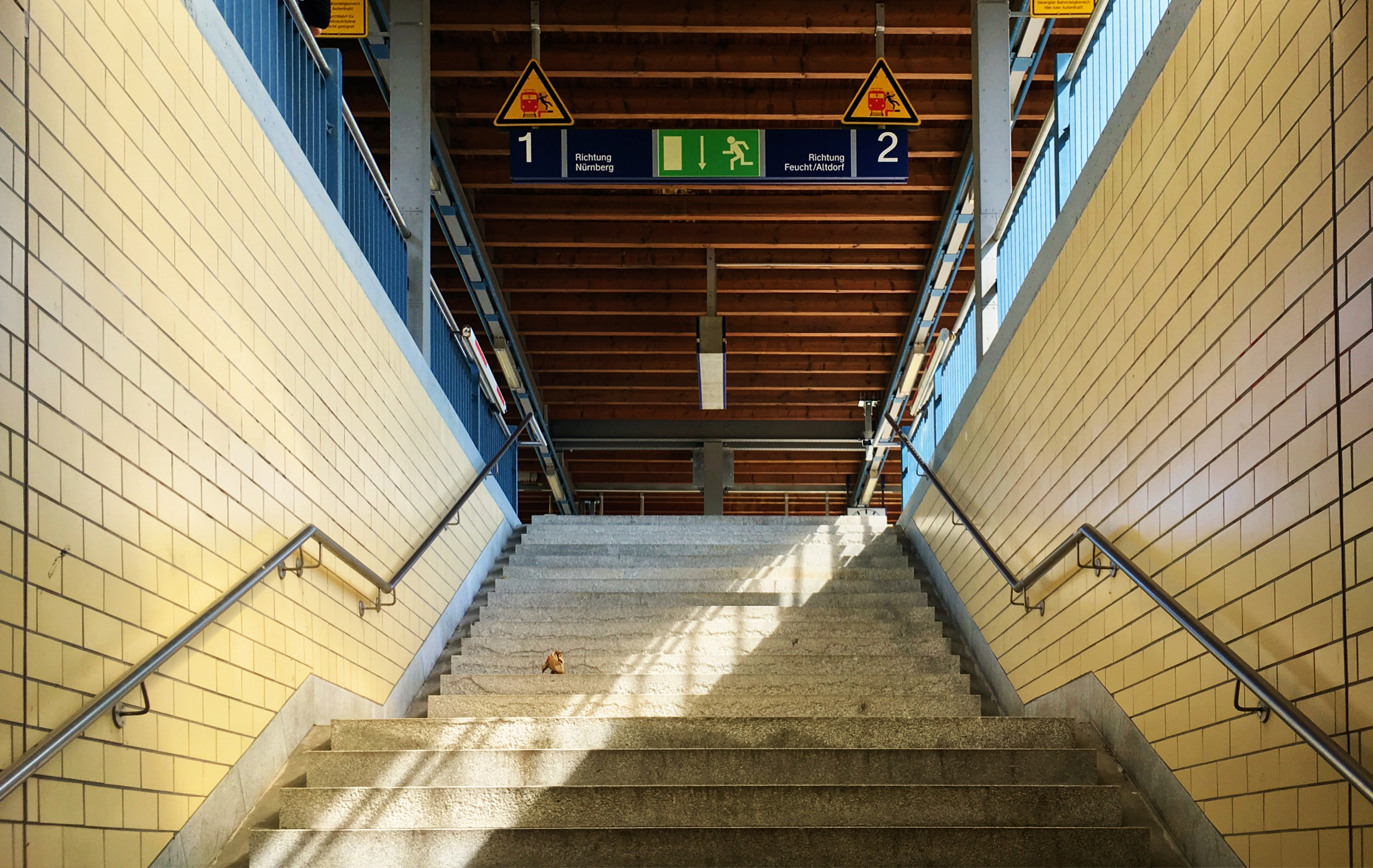
Stairway to the S-Bahn platform

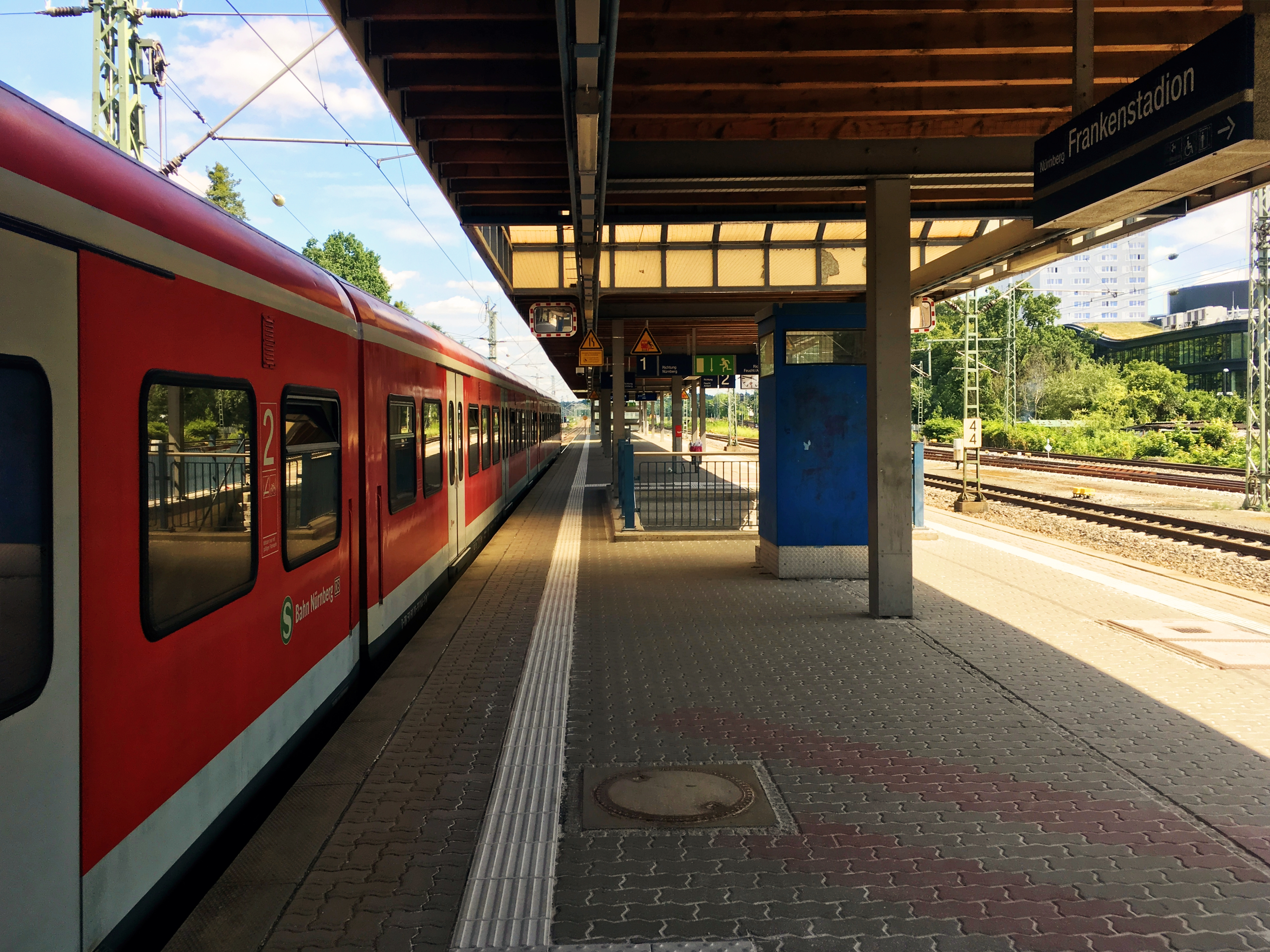
S-Bahn platform with S-Bahn

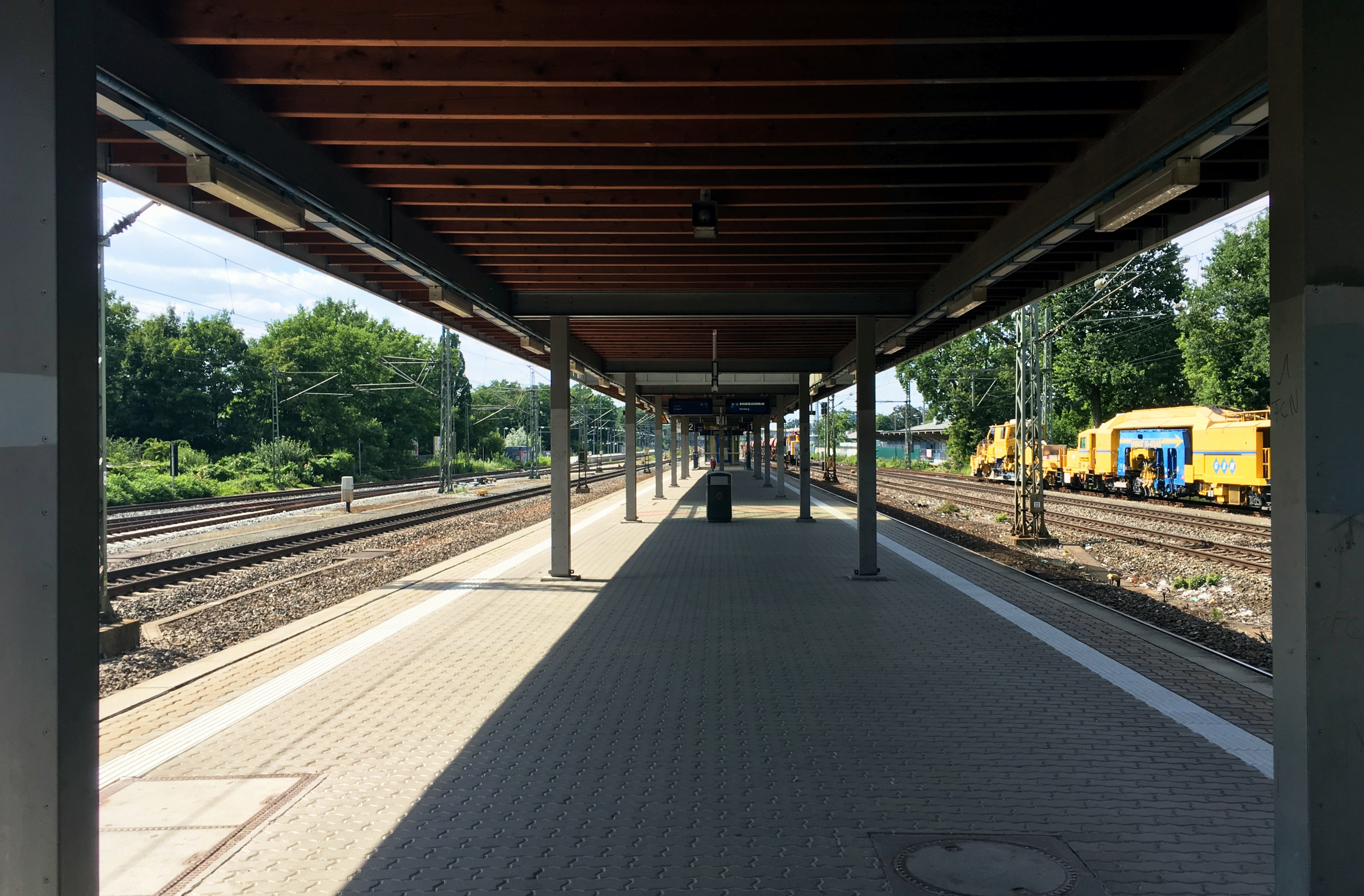
S-Bahn platform

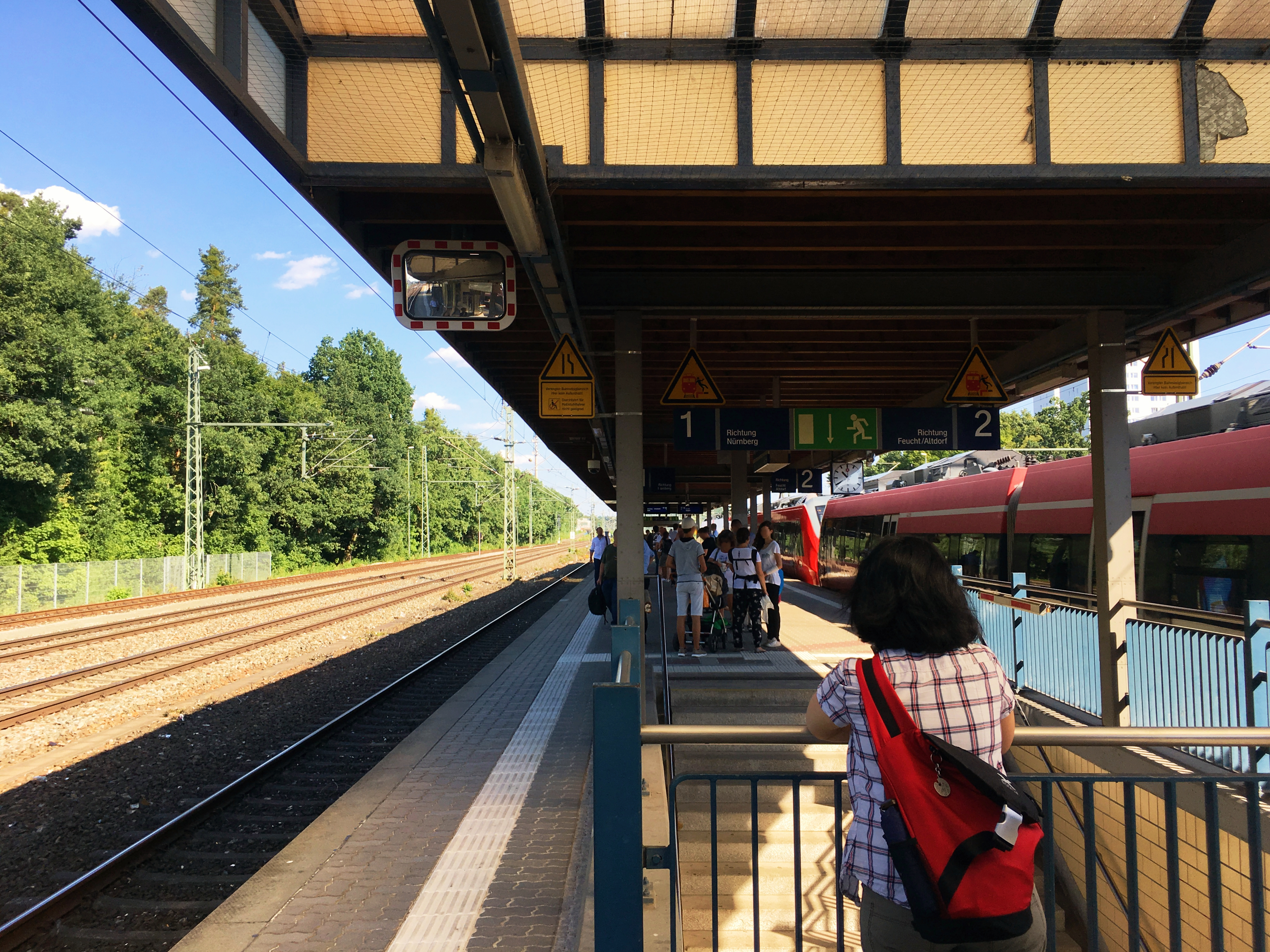
S-Bahn platform with S-Bahn

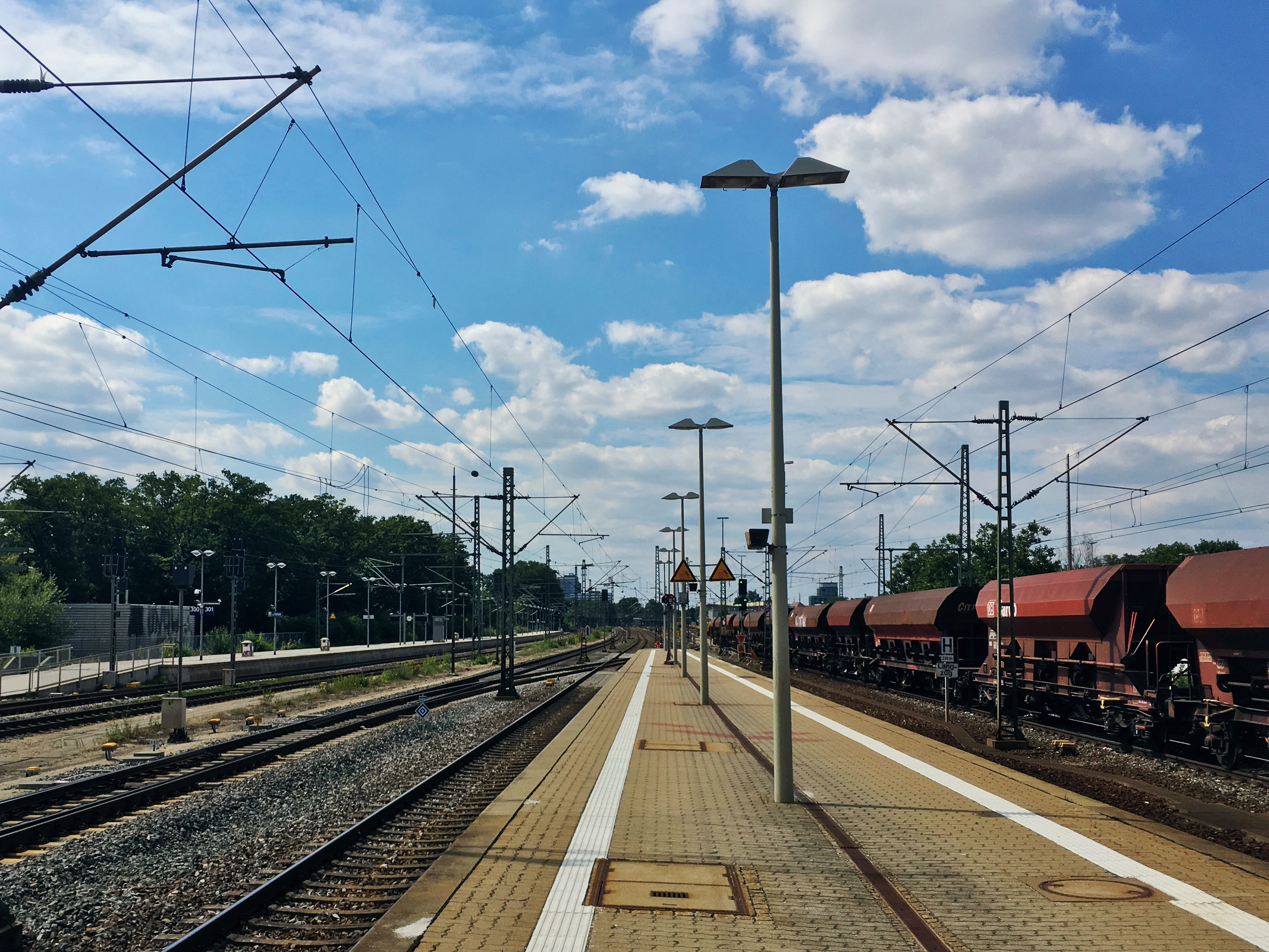
S-Bahn platform with view of the special platform
