= Nürnberg-Gleißhammer station =

Railway station in Nuremberg, Germany

Nürnberg Gleißhammer
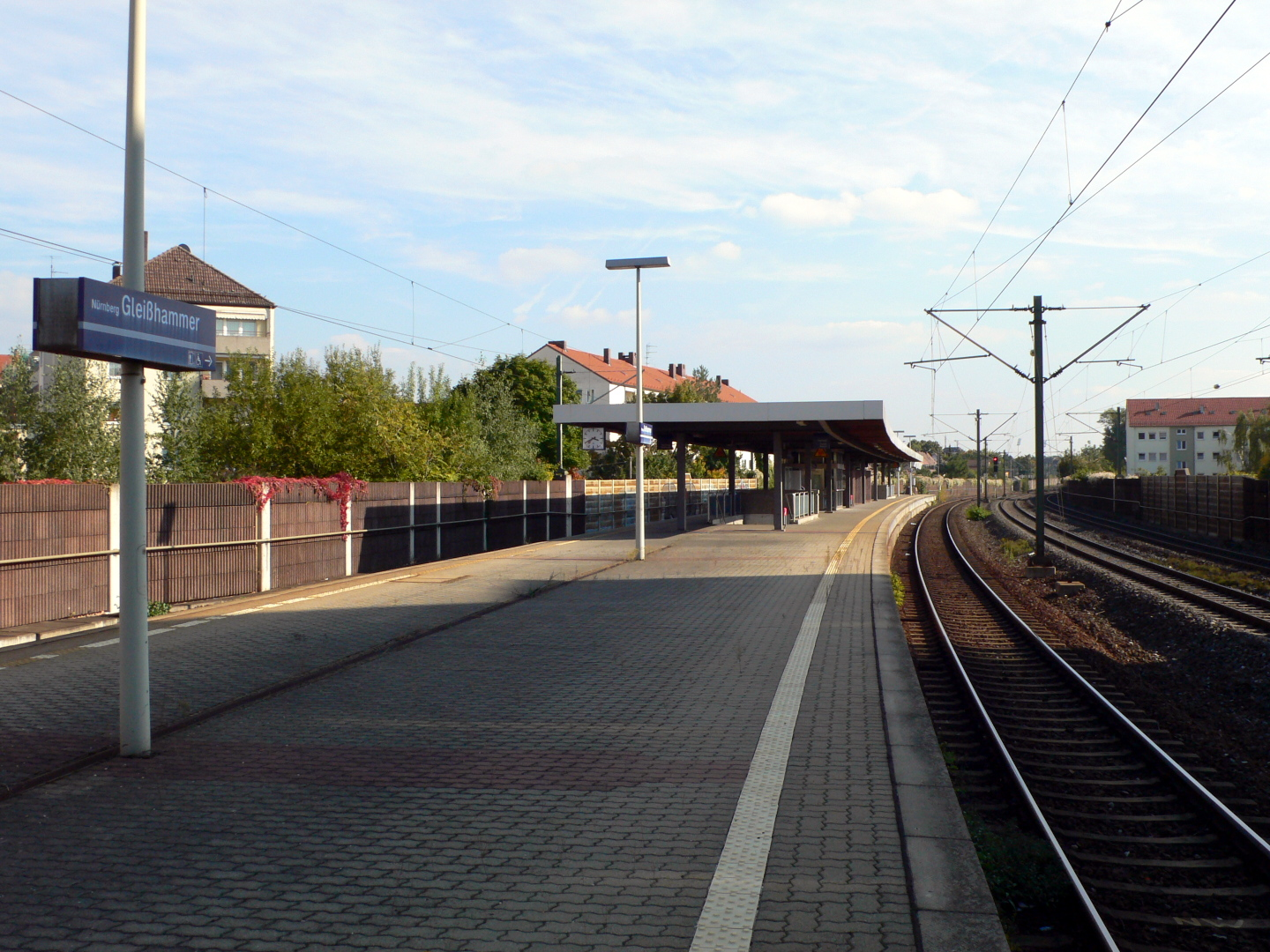
- The station platforms in 2008

General information
- Location: Zerzabelshofstraße/Gottfriedstraße; Nuremberg, Bavaria; Germany
- Coordinates: 49°26′40″N 11°06′41″E
- Owner: DB Netz
- Operator: DB Station&Service
- Lines: Nuremberg–Feucht line (KBS 890.2)
- Distance: 2.3 km (1.4 mi) from Nürnberg Hbf
- Platforms: 1 island platform
- Tracks: 2
- Train operators: DB Regio Bayern

Other information
- Station code: 4602
- DS100 code: NGLH
- IBNR: 8005304
- Category: 5
- Fare zone: VGN: 100
- Website: bahnhof.de/bahnhof-de/bahnhof/Nuernberg-Gleisshammer-1022786%20www.bahnhof.de

History
- Opened: 1920

Services
Preceding station	Nuremberg S-Bahn	Following station
Dürrenhof towards Nürnberg Hbf	S3	Dutzendteich towards Altdorf
Location

Nürnberg-Gleißhammer station is a railway station in Nuremberg, Bavaria, Germany. It is located on the Nuremberg–Feucht line of Deutsche Bahn. It is served by the S2 of the Nuremberg S-Bahn.

== History ==
The Haltepunkt was built in 1920 for the staff of the marshalling yard living in its vicinity and served by the Nürnberg Hauptbahnhof–Nürnberg Rangierbahnhof passenger trains. In 1927, it was opened for general passenger traffic and from 3 June 1984 it was served by the regional trains of N3 line (R5A from 27 September 1987). In the course of the construction work for the S-Bahn line S2, it was rebuilt to meet the requirements of the S-Bahn and returned to service on 22 November 1992.
