= Nürnberg-Dürrenhof station =

Railway station in Nuremberg, Germany

Nürnberg Dürrenhof
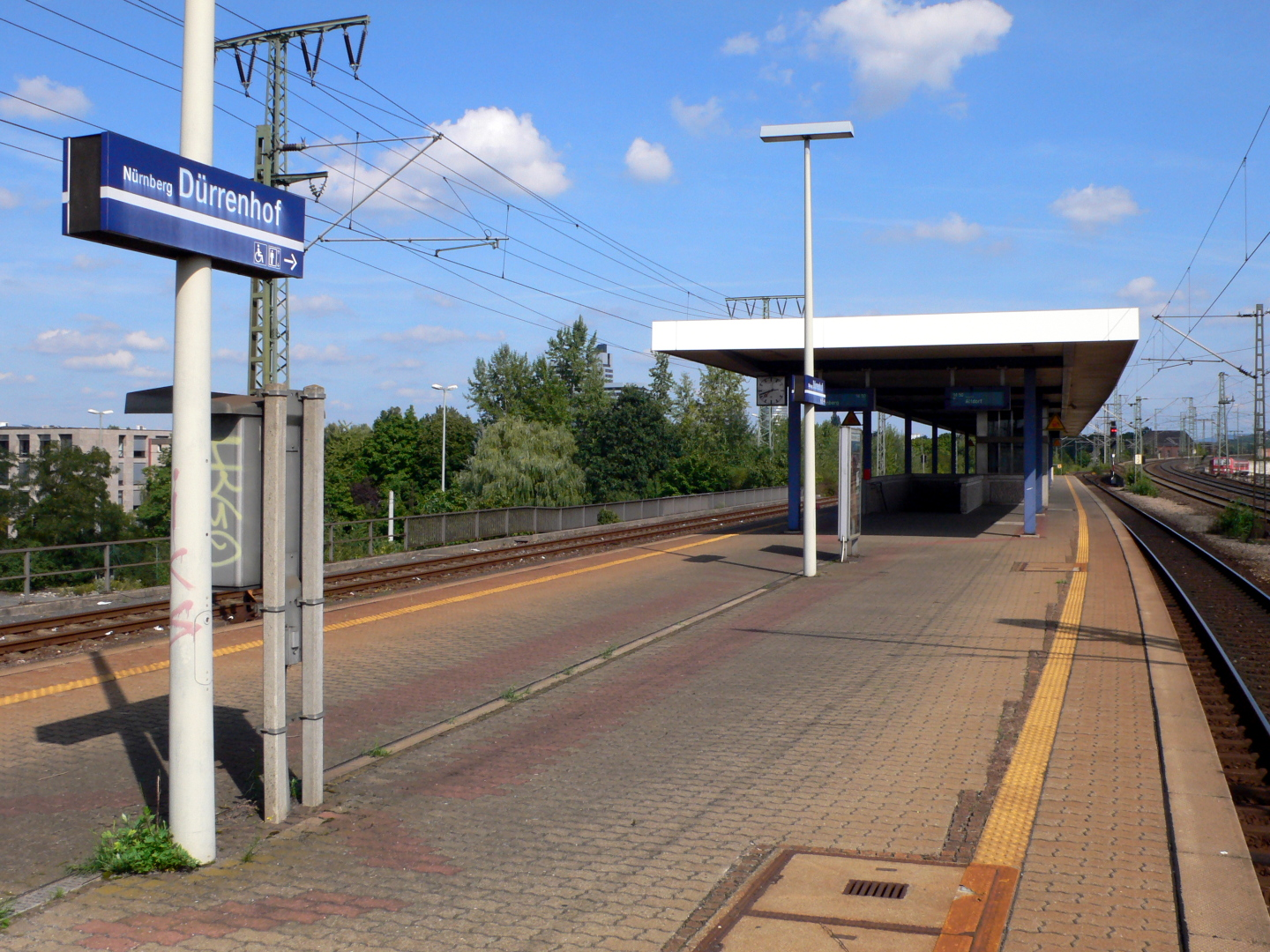
- The station platform in 2008

General information
- Location: Dürrenhofstraße 9 Nuremberg, Bavaria; Germany
- Coordinates: 49°26′53″N 11°05′51″E
- Owner: DB Netz
- Operator: DB Station&Service
- Lines: Nuremberg–Feucht line; Nuremberg–Schwandorf line
- Distance: 1.1 km (0.68 mi) from Nürnberg Hauptbahnhof
- Platforms: 1 island platform
- Tracks: 2
- Train operators: DB Regio Bayern
- Connections: Trams: VGN bus lines

Other information
- Station code: 4597
- DS100 code: NDHF
- IBNR: 8004442
- Category: 5
- Fare zone: VGN: 100
- Website: www.bahnhof.de

Services
Preceding station	Nuremberg S-Bahn	Following station
Nürnberg Hbf towards Roth	S2	Ostring towards Hartmannshof
Nürnberg Hbf Terminus	S3	Gleißhammer towards Altdorf
Location

Nürnberg-Dürrenhof station is a railway station in Nuremberg, Bavaria, Germany. It is served by the Nuremberg suburban train lines S1 and S2 as well as the Nuremberg tramway line 5. The station is located west of the junction between the Nuremberg–Feucht and Nuremberg–Schwandorf lines.

== Operational usage ==
The Nürnberg central station is located in the West of the Dürrenhof station, both Harmannshof and Altdorf are in the East. Tramway and bus stations are in the North of the Dürrenhof station.
