= Nürnberg-Dutzendteich station =

Railway station in Nuremberg, Germany

Nürnberg Dutzendteich
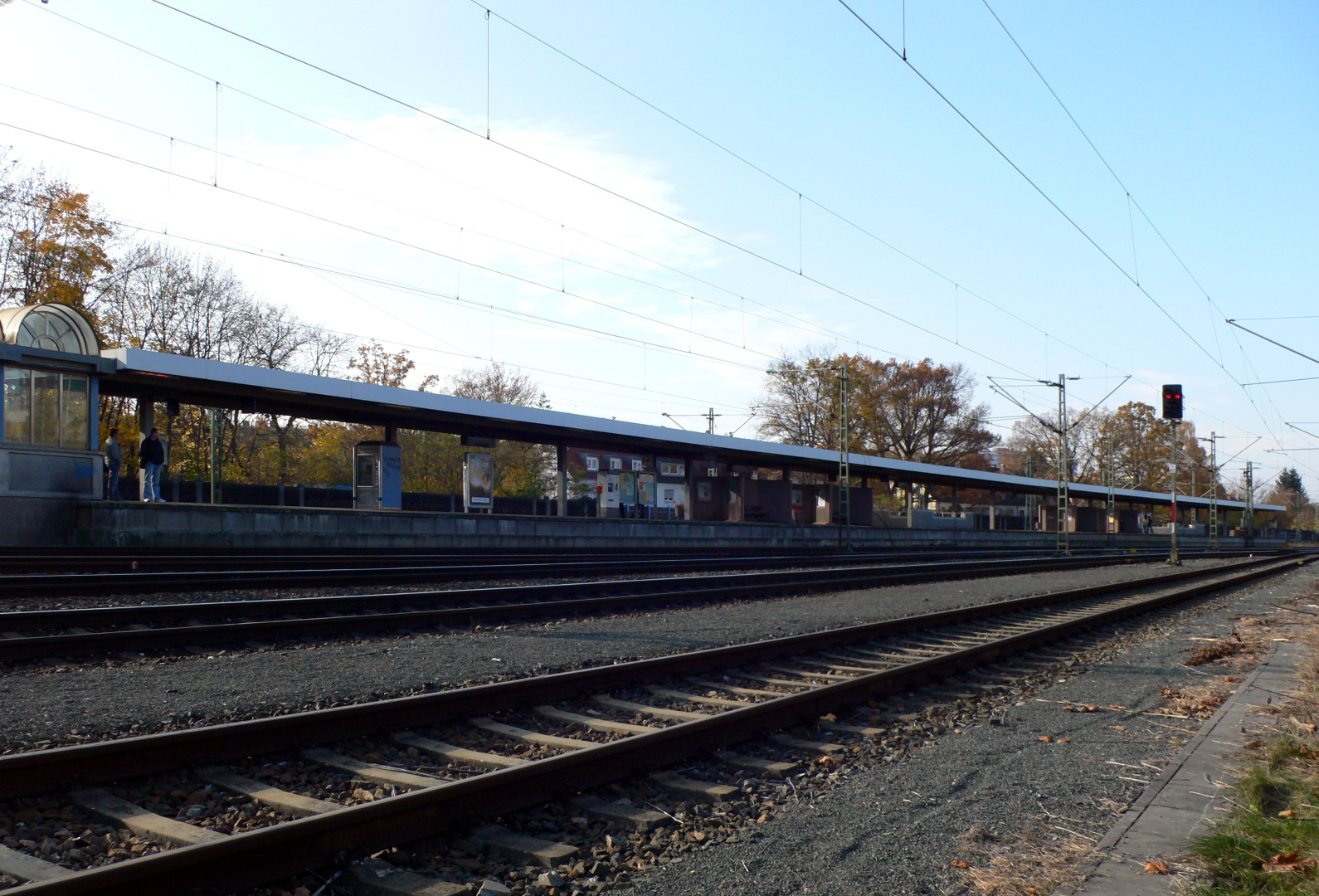
- The station in 2008

General information
- Location: Bayernstraße 175; Nuremberg, Bavaria; Germany
- Coordinates: 49°26′13″N 11°07′03″E
- Owner: DB Netz
- Operator: DB Station&Service
- Lines: Nuremberg–Feucht line (KBS 890.2)
- Distance: 3.2 km (2.0 mi) from Nürnberg Hauptbahnhof
- Platforms: 1 island platform
- Tracks: 2
- Train operators: DB Regio Bayern

Other information
- Station code: 4598
- DS100 code: NDTH, NND
- IBNR: 8004476
- Category: 5
- Fare zone: VGN: 100 and 200
- Website: www.bahnhof.de

History
- Opened: 1 December 1871; 154 years ago
- Electrified: 26 August 1939; 86 years ago

Services
| Preceding station | Nuremberg S-Bahn | Following station |
|---|---|---|
| Gleißhammer towards Nürnberg Hbf | S3 | Frankenstadion towards Altdorf |
Location

Nürnberg-Dutzendteich station is a railway station in Nuremberg, Bavaria, Germany. It is located on the Nuremberg–Feucht line of Deutsche Bahn. It is served by the S2 of the Nuremberg S-Bahn and line 6 of the Nuremberg tramway system.

== History ==
The Dutzendteich station was opened on 1 December 1871 by the Bavarian Eastern Railway Company (Actiengesellschaft der bayerischen Ostbahnen) together with the Nuremberg-Neumarkt section of today's Nuremberg–Regensburg railway. The first station on the single-track line had three platform tracks, and in the northern area an outdoor loading track with scales, which led as siding to the Maschinenfabrik Späth, and a track with ramp. The first station building was dominated by a waiting hall open to the track side, at the northern end of which there was a waiting room of 3rd class and at the southern end a waiting room of 1st and 2nd class. On the street side there was a massive two-storey building with a passageway and service rooms. The surroundings of the railway station were especially designed in a horticultural way and adapted to the park facilities at the number ponds. With the double-track extension of the main line in 1895 and the extension to the junction station by the Nuremberg Ring Railway branches in the direction of Rangierbahnhof (1898) or Mögeldorf / Nürnberg-Ost (1900), as well as the construction of additional freight tracks, the area of the railway station continued to grow.

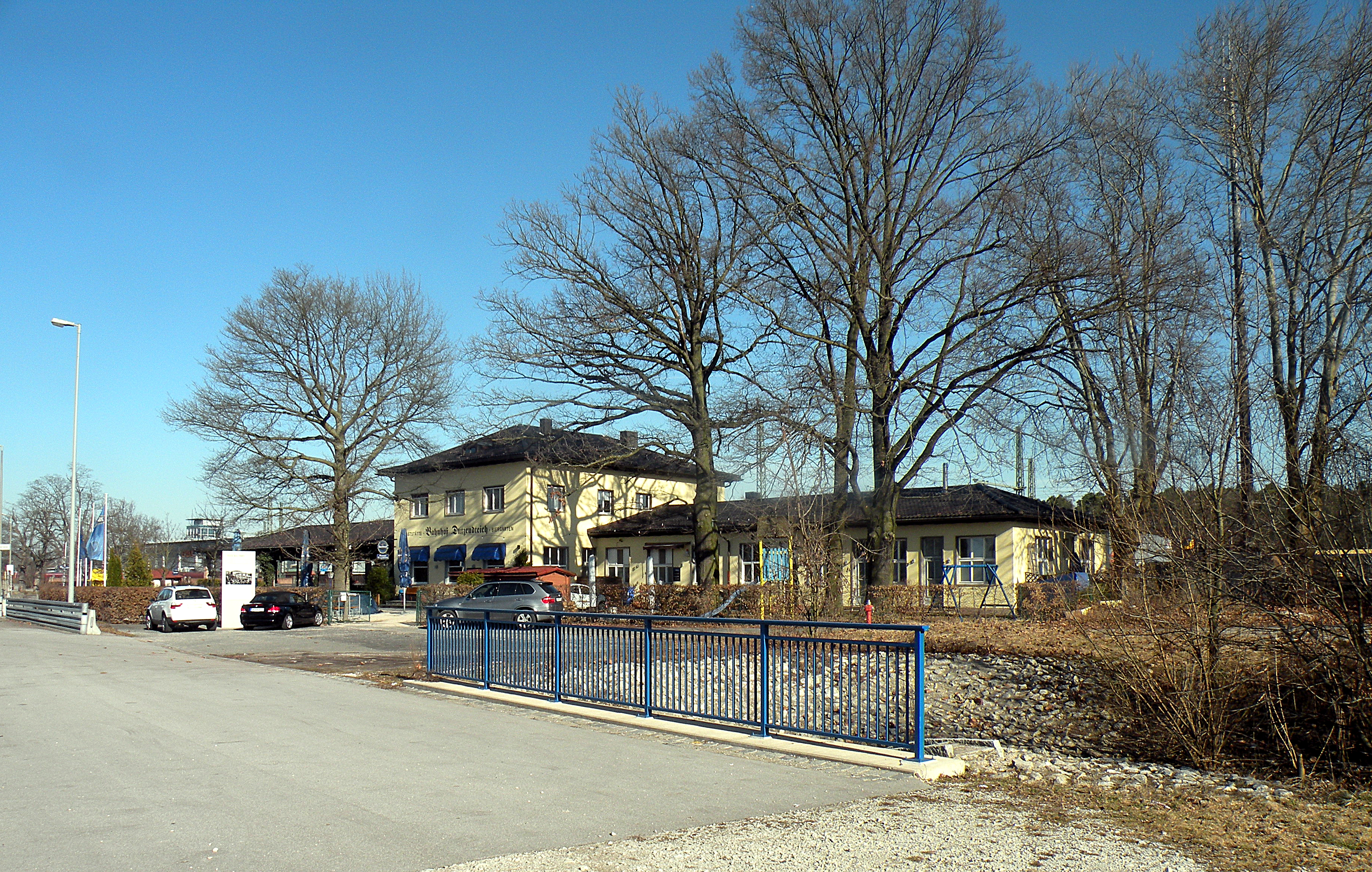
Former reception building, today a restaurant

The first major reconstruction was carried out from 14 March to 5 September 1934, in the course of the Reichsparteitag which had been taking place since 1933, and comprised the construction of a 400-metre-long house and central platform, two underpasses (the eastern one with direct access to the Zeppelin grandstand), as well as the reception building, now under a preservation order, according to plans by Fritz Limpert, for which the first reception building was demolished. This was intended to better cope with the mass rush during the Reichsparteitag.

The second reconstruction between 1989 and 1992 took place in connection with the construction work for the second Nuremberg S-Bahn line to Altdorf, as the construction plans included the relocation of the passenger railway station to the north-west, which was unfavourably located in terms of traffic, to the overpass over the southern ring (Südring). The S2 and the new Nuremberg-Dutzendteich S-Bahn station went into operation on 22 November 1992, the old unused platforms were removed in the course of the following years and the former reception building was converted into a restaurant.

According to a research conducted by Bayerischer Rundfunk in 2016, Deutsche Bahn plans to discontinue operation of the "Nuernberg-Dutzendtch" freight transport station (Gvst No. 222075).
