= S5 (Nuremberg) =

Overview
- Service type: Nuremberg S-Bahn
- Locale: Nuremberg
- Predecessor: Allersberg-Express
- First service: 13 December 2020; 4 years ago
- Current operator(s): DB Regio Franken

Route
- Line(s) used: Nürnberg Hbf–Regensburg Hbf; Nürnberg Reichswald–Ingolstadt Nord

Technical
- Rolling stock: Alstom Coradia Continental

The S5 is a service on the Nuremberg S-Bahn network since 13 December 2020.

== History ==
The Allersberg-Express has been integrated as the S5 in the system of the Nuremberg S-Bahn. For this purpose, a request for tender for a 12-year transport contract was made in mid-2013, which will provide annually seven million train kilometers. The timetable is expected to remain largely unchanged, and new vehicles will be used on the route. The Bayerische Eisenbahngesellschaft renounced according to own data for cost reasons to announce the new offer together with the München-Nürnberg-Express. An extension, for example to Ansbach, will be examined. In January 2015, the Bayerische Eisenbahngesellschaft announced that the National Express Germany had won both lots of the Nuremberg S-Bahn and thus also the Allersberg-Express and will operate this from December 2018. On 19 December 2016, it was decided that DB Regio Franken would continue operating the S5 from 2018 onwards. The new "S5" started service with the December 2020 schedule change. It is operated with two Alstom Coradia Continental (DB Class 1440) specially equipped with LZB to be able to operate on the Nuremberg–Ingolstadt high-speed railway.

== Network ==
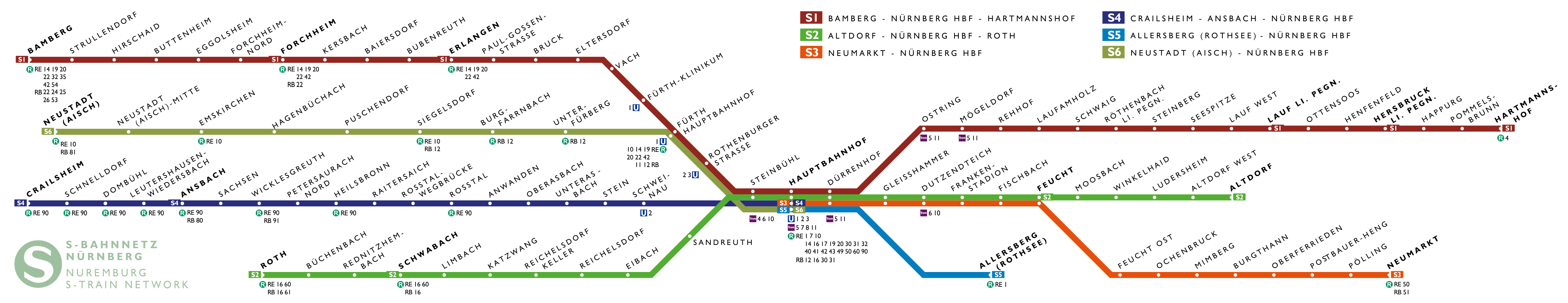
S-Bahn network map (as of December 2017)
