= Max-Morlock-Stadion =

Football stadium

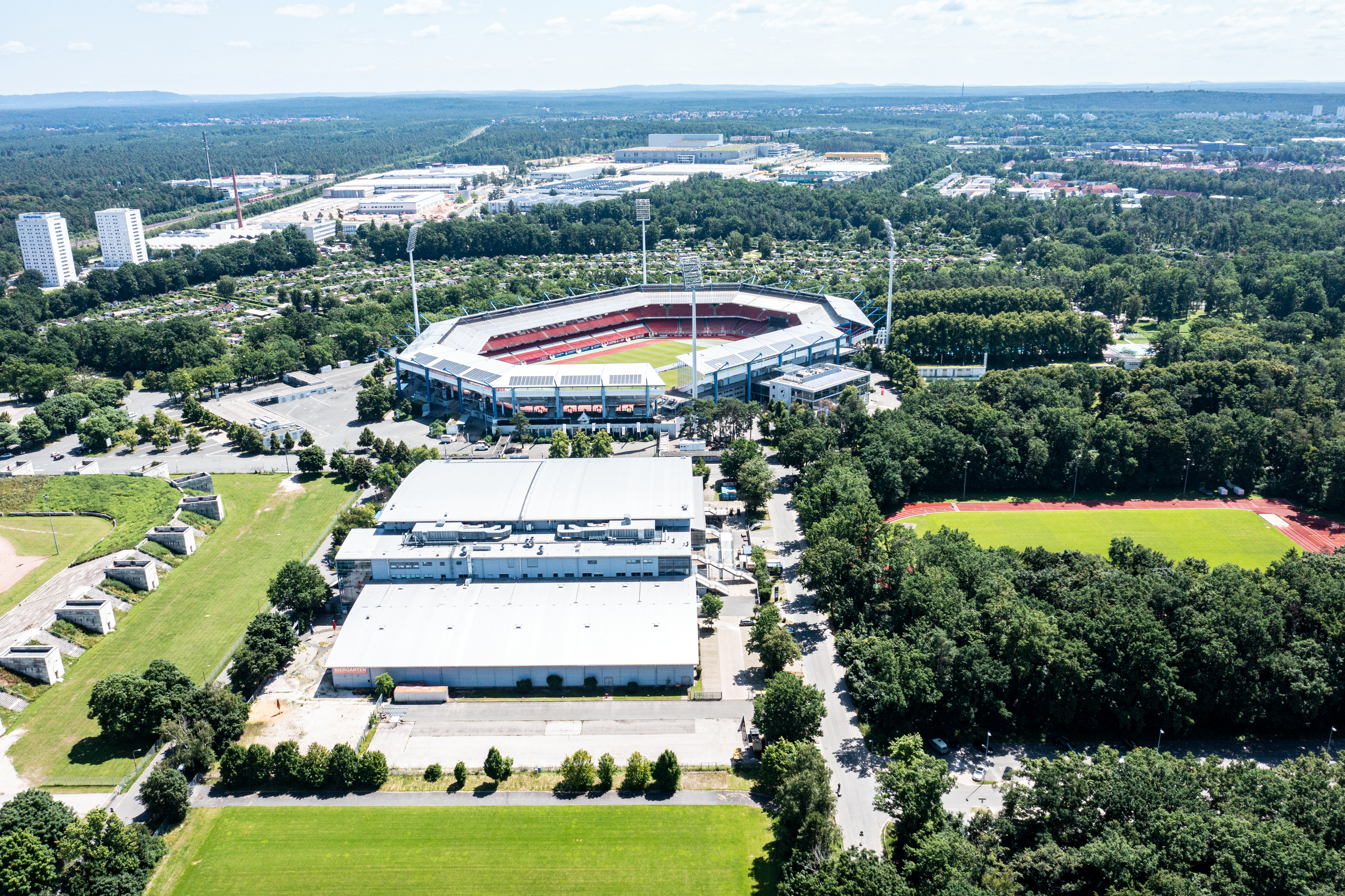
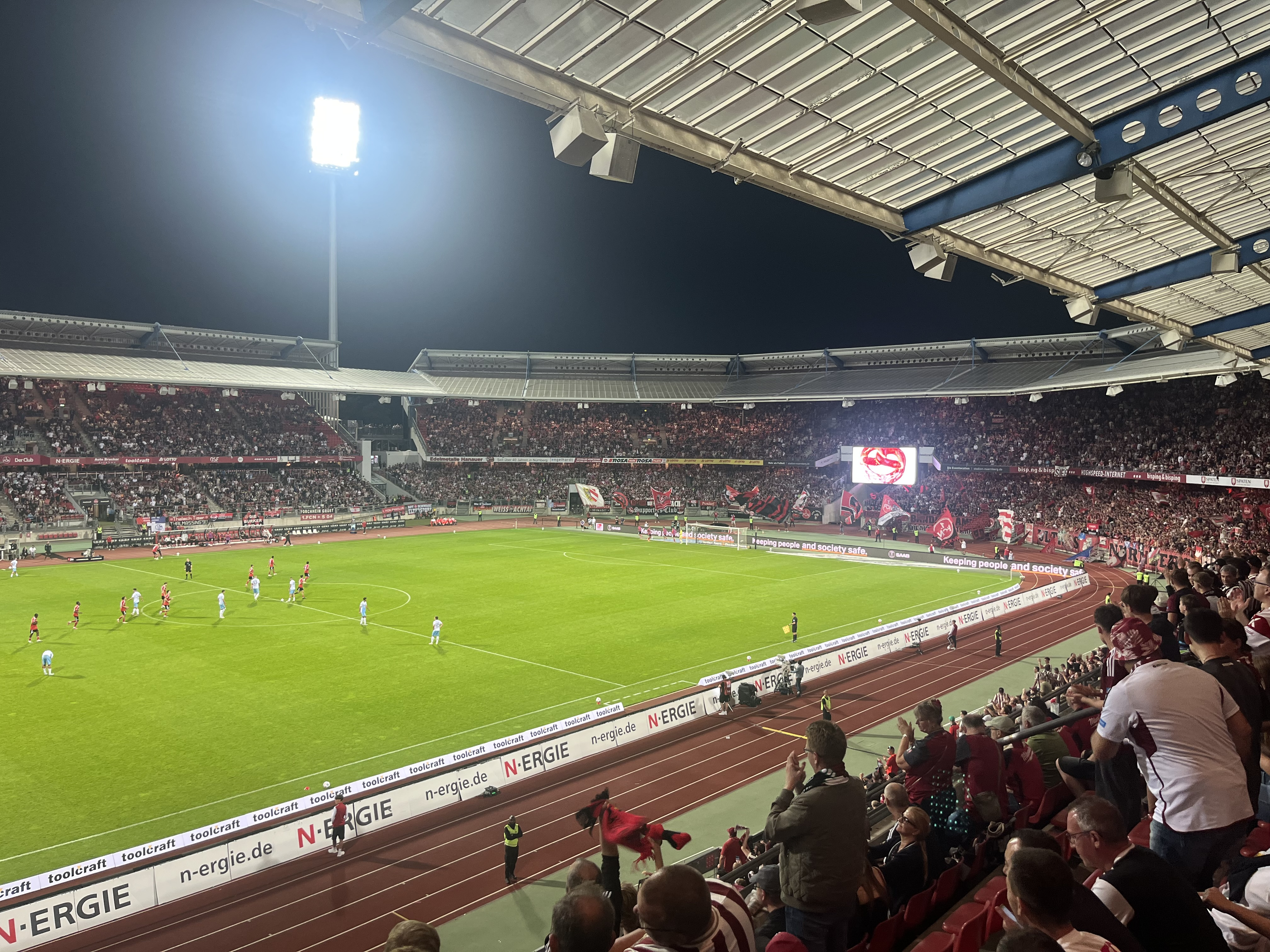
- Interactive map of Max-Morlock-Stadion
- Former names: Städtisches Stadion (1928–1945, 1961–1991); Victory Stadium (1945–1961); Frankenstadion (1991–2006) easyCredit-Stadion (2006–2012); Stadion Nürnberg (2012–2013, 2016–2017); Grundig Stadion (2013–2016)
- Location: Nuremberg, Germany
- Coordinates: 49°25′34″N 11°7′33″E
- Owner: City of Nuremberg
- Capacity: 50,000 (League matches), 44,308 (International matches)
- Surface: Grass
- Field size: 105 × 68 m

Construction
- Built: 1928
- Opened: 1928
- Cost: 56.2 million Euros

Tenants
- 1. FC Nürnberg (1963–present); Germany national football team (selected matches)

Max-Morlock-Stadion (German pronunciation: [maksˈmɔʁlɔkˌʃtaːdi̯ɔn]) is a stadium in Nuremberg, Germany, which was opened in 1928. It is located next to Zeppelinfeld. It also neighbors the Nuremberg Arena.

Since 1966, it has been home stadium to the German 2. Bundesliga club 1. FC Nürnberg. During the 1972 Summer Olympics, it hosted six football matches. In 1967, it hosted the European Cup Winners' Cup final between Rangers and Bayern Munich. Bayern won 1–0.

The stadium hosted five games of the 2006 FIFA World Cup, including the famous match between Portugal and the Netherlands, consequently known as the Battle of Nuremberg.

== Name ==
Originally it was known as the Städtisches Stadion [ˈʃtɛtɪʃəs ˌʃtaːdi̯ɔn] (English: Municipal Stadium) until 1945, when it was renamed Victory Stadium in honour of the Allied triumph over Nazi Germany in the Second World War. In 1961, it returned to its original name until 1991, when it received the name Frankenstadion (German pronunciation: [ˈfʁaŋkn̩ˌʃtaːdi̯ɔn]). The associated railway station opened the following year, and continues to bear the name Frankenstadion, never having changed its name despite the stadium having undergone four additional name changes since then.

On 14 March 2006, the stadium was renamed easyCredit-Stadion [iːziˈkʁɛdɪtˌʃtaːdi̯ɔn] for a period of five years, after a sponsorship deal with the German bank DZ Bank. Many fans of the 1. FC Nuremberg, led by the "Ultras Nuremberg" introduced on 1 April 2006, held demonstration against the name and symbolically renamed the stadium with its current name, in honour of one of the best players in the club's history, Max Morlock. On 14 February 2013, the stadium was renamed Grundig Stadion (pronounced [ˈɡʁʊndɪç ˌʃtaːdi̯ɔn] or [ˈɡʁʊndɪk-]), after a sponsorship deal with German consumer electronics company Grundig.

In July 2016, the stadium's name changed back to Stadion Nürnberg after the city of Nuremberg could not find a new sponsor. From 1 July 2017, the stadium's name officially became Max-Morlock-Stadion.

== Facilities ==
The available facilities at the stadium include two changing rooms for players and additional changing rooms for coaches and referees. Physician and treatment rooms are also available, as well as a 300 m² press area, a room for press conferences and three TV studios. There is also a 1600 m² VIP area with room for up to 1500 guests. To compensate for the large number of seats there are 12,000 parking spaces with 275 of those being VIP parking spaces.

The stadium also has track and field facilities that follow international regulation and a full sprinkler system that feeds the grass with rain water. The pitch is also heated and lit with a floodlight system. There are two 60 m² video walls that provide video to the fans. There is also a full power back up system, powered by diesel generators.

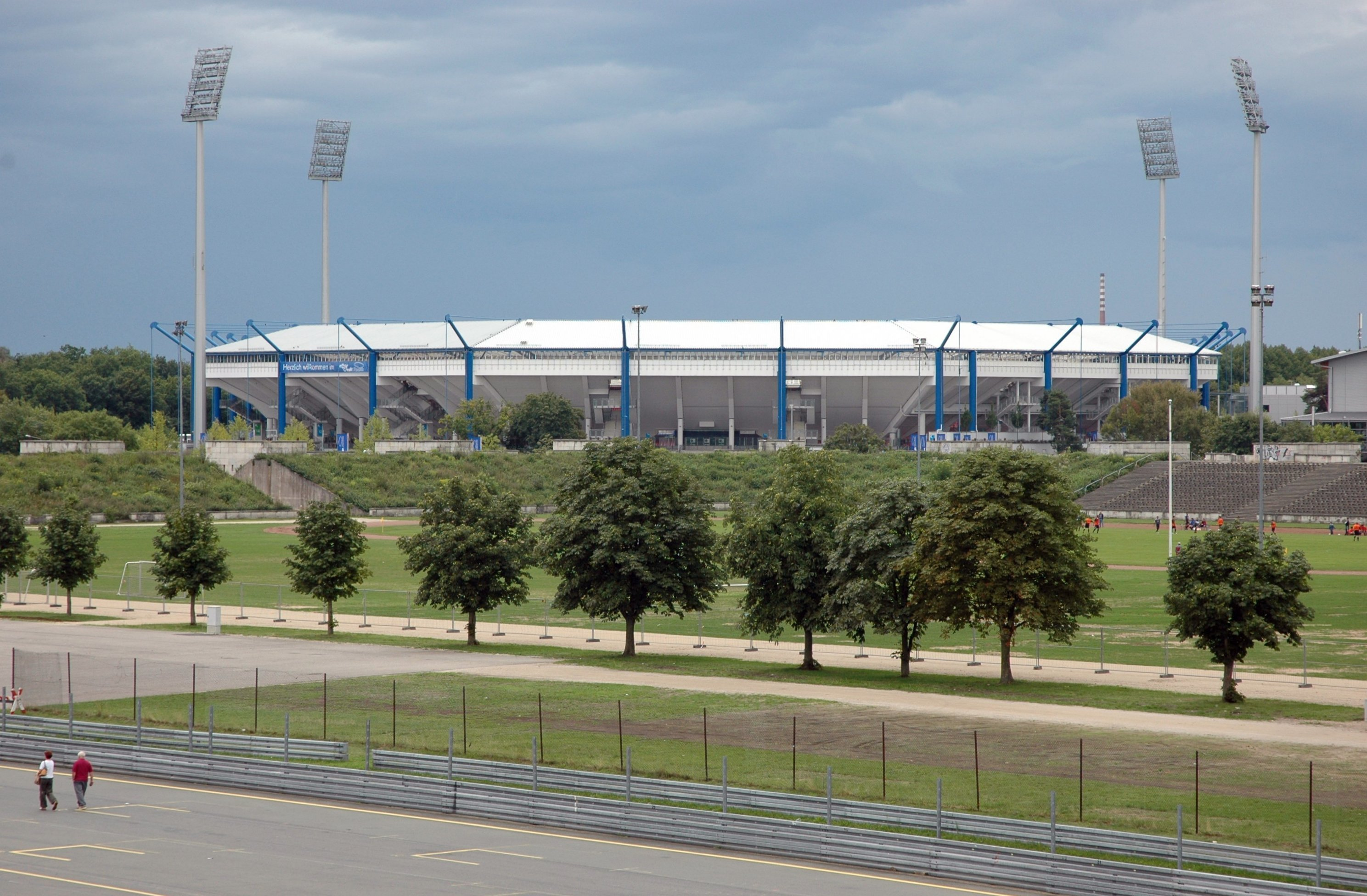
Stadium view from outside

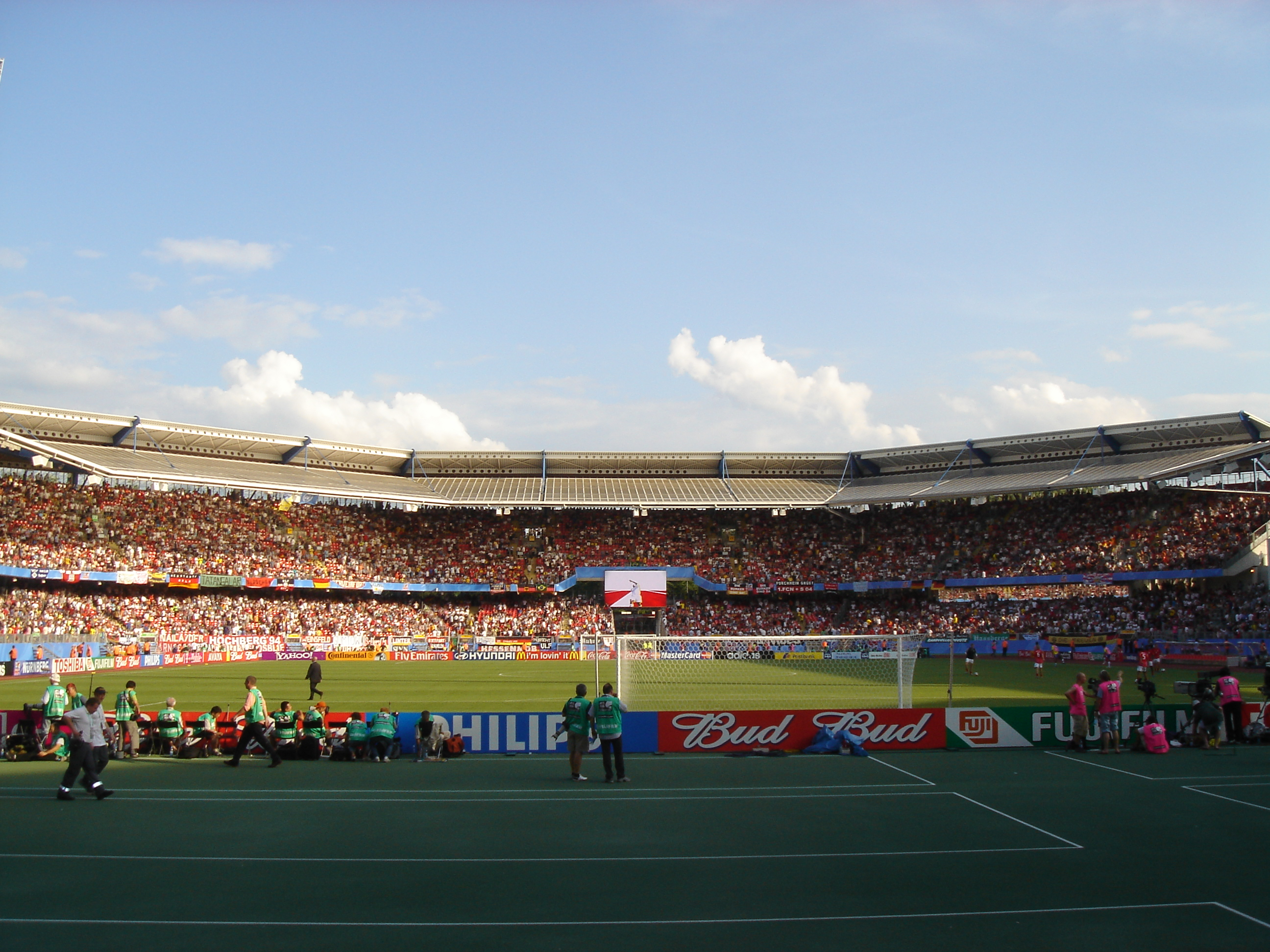
Football match in the stadium

== History ==
Beginning in 1933, the National Socialists began to use the stadium as a marching area for the Hitler Youth. The fourth Deutsche Kampfspiele (German Combat Games), one of the biggest events organized by the Nazi Sports Body, took place in this stadium from 23–29 July 1934.

Following 1963, the stadium was reconditioned multiple times, so that it could meet the requirements for football in the Bundesliga.

== Renovations ==
Max-Morlock-Stadion has been renovated twice, firstly from 1988 to 1991, and then again in 2002, to be ready in time for both the 2005 FIFA Confederations Cup and the 2006 World Cup. The 2002 renovation cost €56.2 million which was split between the city of Nürnberg, the State of Bavaria and the building society, which managed the stadium. This modernisation (designed and realized by HPP Architects) increased the capacity to 48,548 by extending the southwest and northwest grandstand. The playing field was lowered by 1.30 metres in order to provide all seats with an unrestricted view of the field. The Max-Morlock-Platz was developed as a place for fans to meet and enjoy something to eat; the total area of this place is 1,000 square metres. In the summer of 2012, the capacity was increased to 50,000.

== Concerts ==
The Monsters of Rock Tour 1984, originally planned on the Zeppelinfield, took place in the Städtisches Stadion.

AC/DC performed at the stadium on 29 June 2001 during their Stiff Upper Lip World Tour.

P!nk performed at the stadium on 15 July 2010 during the Funhouse Summer Carnival.

Rock im Park takes place at this stadium.

== Transportation ==
The stadium and the adjacent Nuremberg Arena are well serviced by public transportation to facilitate transport of fans from and to the various sports and musical events taking place there:

- Bus stop Max-Morlock-Platz, right in front of the stadium. Serviced by Bus line 55
- Frankenstadion station, about 400 Meters (1300 ft) or a 5-minute walk from the stadium. Serviced by S-Bahn line S3
- Dutzendteich station and tramway stop, about 1300 m (4000 ft) or a 10-minute walk from the stadium. Services by Bus lines 55 and 65, Tramway line 6 and S-Bahn line S3
- Messe subway station, about 1800 m (5500 ft) or a 15-minute walk from the Stadium. Serviced by U-Bahn (Subway) lines U1 and U11

During mass sports and entertainment events, such as Bundesliga games or the annual Rock im Park festival, additional S-Bahn trains running between main station and Frankenstadion station are being put into service. Before the 2006 FIFA World Cup, Frankenstadion station had the length of its existing platform doubled and an additional platform built for that purpose.

== 2006 FIFA World Cup ==
The stadium was one of the venues for the 2006 FIFA World Cup. The following games were played at the stadium during the tournament:

Date	Time (CET)	Team #1	Res.	Team #2	Round	Spectators
11 June 2006	18:00	Mexico	3–1	Iran	Group D	41,000
15 June 2006	18:00	England	2–0	Trinidad and Tobago	Group B	41,000
18 June 2006	15:00	Japan	0–0	Croatia	Group F	41,000
22 June 2006	16:00	Ghana	2–1	United States	Group E	41,000
25 June 2006	21:00	Portugal	1–0	Netherlands	Round of 16	41,000
