= Nuremberg–Feucht railway =

Railway line in Germany

Nuremberg Hbf – Feucht railway

Overview
- Line number: 5970
- Locale: Bavaria, Germany

Service
- Route number: 890.2, 890.3

Technical
- Line length: 12.5 km (7.8 mi)
- Track gauge: 1,435 mm (4 ft 8 1/2 in) standard gauge
- Electrification: 15 kV/16.7 Hz AC overhead catenary
- Operating speed: 120 km/h (75 mph)

The Nuremberg–Feucht railway is a 12.5-kilometre (7.8 mi)-long main-line railway in the German state of Bavaria, running from Nuremberg Hauptbahnhof to Feucht. It was built parallel with the Nuremberg–Regensburg railway during the first construction phase of the Nuremberg S-Bahn and opened on 21 November 1992.

== History ==
The first demands for an S-Bahn network in greater Nuremberg were made in 1966. Deutsche Bundesbahn made a step in this direction in 1969 with increased services on the main lines during peak hours. The changes were applied to the Nuremberg–Feucht (–Altdorf) line and after that it was served at 30-minute intervals (Nuremberg–Feucht) or 60-minute intervals (Feucht–Altdorf). This service had to be withdrawn in the following years for operational reasons and also because of poor patronage, but Deutsche Bundesbahn still sought an improvement in services. In 1971, the then Bundesbahndirektion (railway division, BD) of Nuremberg was granted permission to develop solutions to improve services. The results were presented on 20 March 1975 as a "framework plan for the Nuremberg S-Bahn", which included an S-Bahn line from Nuremberg via Feucht to Altdorf. This was included as part of the "first stage” of construction of the Nuremberg S-Bahn adopted on 29 June 1979, as well as in the financial agreement closed on 2 November 1981, which allowed detailed planning to begin.

=== Preliminary planning ===
The realisation of the planned "mainline replacement line" between Roth and Fischbach through the Nuremberg Reichswald (imperial forest) would have relieved the Nuremberg–Roth line and thus made room for S-Bahn services on the existing double track line. After the adjacent municipalities and citizens groups expressed opposition to the Reichswald route, the Nuremberg BD examined the plans between 1980 and 1985 on behalf of Deutsche Bundesbahn. At the same time, the BD proposed the construction of a new line from Nuremberg to Ingolstadt as an alternative option. There was resistance to this option in Swabia, leading to Deutsche Bundesbahn commissioning an investigation of the two options on behalf of the government of Bavaria. As a report could not be expected quickly and the start of construction for line S2 could not be delayed indefinitely, most of the S-Bahn project participants developed an option-neutral solution for the S-Bahn tracks in 1987, on which construction was able to commence in June 1988, after the completion of the approval process.

=== Construction ===
Construction of the track began on 15 June 1988 and the total cost of line S2 was given as 587 million Deutsche Marks (€ 300.13 million). This included the adaptation of the line and existing stations for the S-Bahn and the construction of additional stations and rail infrastructure.

==== Infrastructure ====
The existing stations of Nürnberg-Gleißhammer, Fischbach (bei Nürnberg) and Feucht were upgraded to have 145 metres (475 ft) long and 92 centimetres (36 in) high platforms and to be barrier-free. Nuremberg Dürrenhof station was rebuilt over the Dürrenhof Tunnel as a junction station of lines S1 (Nuremberg Hbf–Lauf (links Pegnitz)) and S2. The old Nürnberg-Dutzendteich station was closed and replaced by the two adjacent better-placed stations. The new Nürnberg-Dutzendteich station was built to the west on the overpass over the South Ring (B 4 R) and Nürnberg Frankenstadion station was built to the east on the overpass over Hans-Kalb-Straße. At the time, the proposed Nürnberg-Altenfurt station could not be realised. Bicycle storage (B + R) was provided at the stations of Nürnberg-Gleißhammer, Nürnberg Dutzendteich, Fischbach (bei Nürnberg) and Feucht and commuter car parking (P + R) was provided at the stations of Nürnberg Dutzendteich, Fischbach (bei Nürnberg) and Feucht.

The entire Nuremberg–Feucht–Altdorf S-Bahn line is controlled from a newly established electronic control centre at Fischbach (bei Nürnberg).

==== Line ====
A separate line was built east of the existing Nuremberg–Regensburg line, so that S-Bahn trains could operate independently of the already congested line. Noise barriers were provided on a short section of double track between Fischbach and Feucht and where required. Other construction work related to the area of the eastern exit from Nuremberg Hauptbahnhof, improvements to the interchange with the U-Bahn and Dutzendteich station. In order to make the two S-Bahn lines work as envisaged by the planners a separate two-track line was created up to September 1990 on the north eastern side of the station exit from the end of platform tracks 2 and 3 at the Hauptbahnhof. This continued over grade-separated tracks along the line to Schwandorf and over an overpass over the Nuremberg–Cheb lines and the access tracks to the "eastern storage sidings". At Dutzendteich station the tracks had to be separated from the main-line tracks, even if the already planned high-speed line to Ingolstadt was built. The S-Bahn tracks were placed between the tracks of the ring railway from Nürnberg Ost and Nürnberg Mögeldorf towards the Nuremberg marshalling yard (Nürnberg Rangierbahnhof) and the Nuremberg–Regensburg line, which meant that the existing at-grade crossing of passenger traffic on the Nuremberg–Regensburg line with the freight trains from Hof, Schirnding and Furth towards Nuremberg yard had to be abandoned. As a replacement for it, a grade-separated structure was built between the stations of Nürnberg Frankenstadion and Fischbach (bei Nürnberg) to allow freight trains from the north and from Regensburg to branch off to the southwest towards the tracks of the ring railway towards the marshalling yard.

As part of the planned S-Bahn to Neumarkt, it was planned to duplicate the single-track section between Fischbach and Feucht to increase capacity by 12 December 2010, but this could not be achieved, due to the weather conditions. The completion of this work was rescheduled from 15 to 17 April 2011 and the line has been fully duplicated since 18 April 2011.

== Route ==
The line leaves Nuremberg Hauptbahnhof to the east and runs to Nürnberg-Dürrenhof station, where the line to Schwandorf, which is served by S-Bahn line S1 branches off. Subsequently, line S2 turns into a right-hand bend to the southeast and crosses the Nuremberg–Cheb line, then runs through the suburbs of St. Peter and Gleisshammer to Nürnberg-Gleisshammer, which is located on the overpass over Zerzabelshofstraße, and reaches Nürnberg-Dutzendteich station, which is located on the overpass over the south ring. The line continues parallel to Regensburger Straße (B 4), past the Zeppelin Field grandstand, passing Nürnberg Frankenstadion station, and then crosses the tracks of the ring railway towards the marshalling yard. Passing through the Grundig estate and the industrial area in north Altenfurt, the line reaches Fischbach (bei Nürnberg) station, which is located on the overpass over Löwenberger Straße. Then, the line turns to the southeast, running on the eastern edge of Altenfurt and under the A 6 and leaves the Nuremberg city area. The line continues through Fischbach forest to reach the urban area of Feucht, then passes under the A 9 and finally reaches Feucht station.

== Line standards ==
The line is duplicated and electrified throughout and can be operated at a maximum line speed of 120 kilometres per hour (75 mph). All stations along the line have platforms that are 145 metres (475 ft) long and 96 centimetres (38 in) high above the top of the rail. Nürnberg Frankenstadion station has a 272 metres (892 ft) long platform so that it can handle special trains for major events.

== Operations ==
Services on the line are operated by push-pull trains, composed of class 143 electric locomotives with four x-Wagen (carriages) as S-Bahn line S2 (Roth–Nuremberg–Feucht–Altdorf). For major events in the arena or in Frankenstadion, services on the Hauptbahnhof–Frankenstadion section are reinforced by additional services. The track has also been used since 10 December 2010 by services of S-Bahn line S3 (Nuremberg–Feucht–Neumarkt), but S3 services do not stop between Nuremberg Hauptbahnhof and Feucht.
