= Volkspark Dutzendteich =

Park in Nuremberg, Germany

Coordinates: 49.424°N 11.111°E

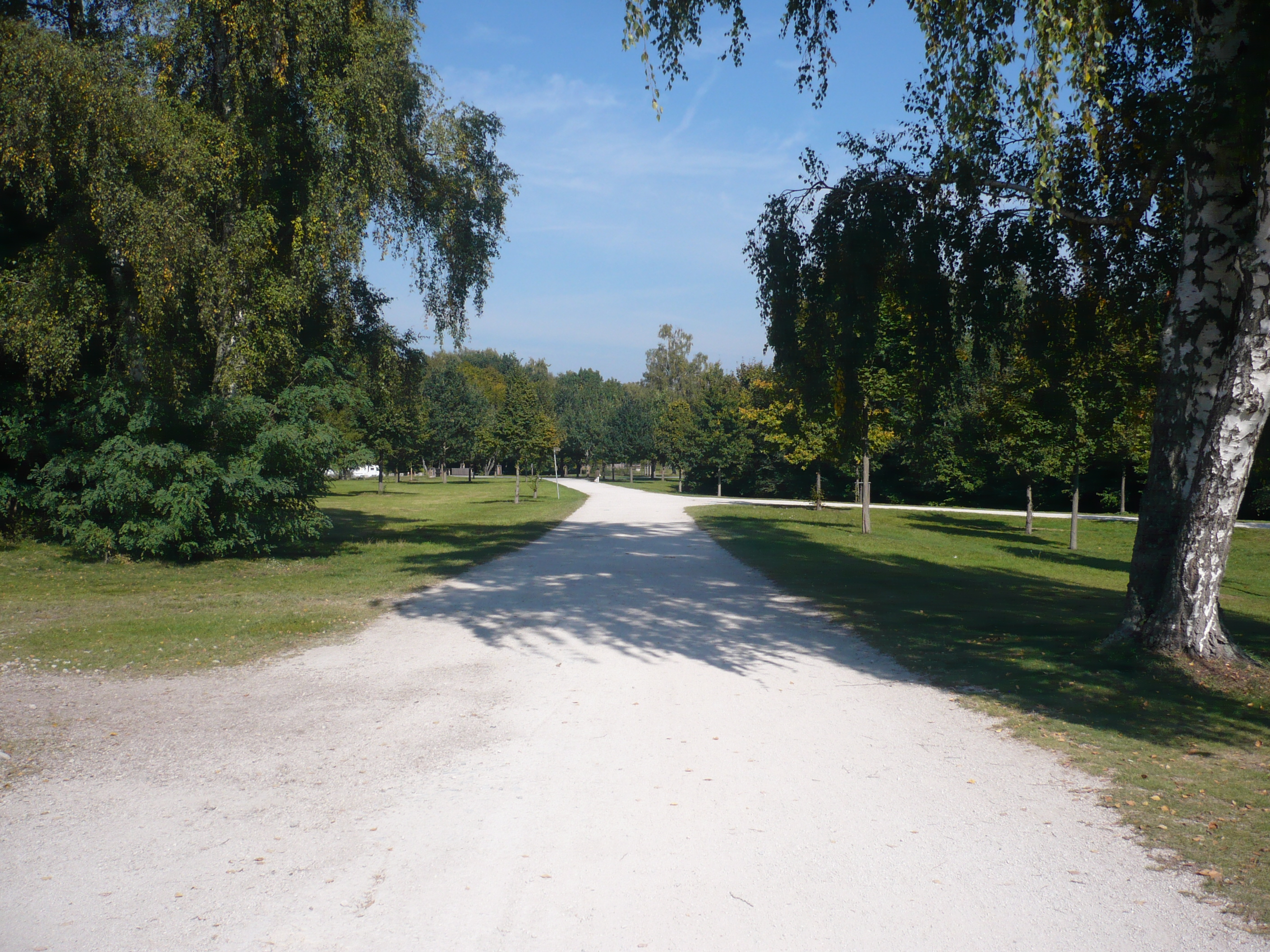
Volkspark Dutzendteich

Volkspark Dutzendteich is a park located in Nuremberg, Germany. It hosts the annual Rock im Park festival.
