= S3 (Nuremberg) =

Overview
- Locale: Nuremberg

Service
- System: Nuremberg S-Bahn
- Operator(s): DB Regio Franken
- Rolling stock: Bombardier Talent 2

The S3 is a service on the Nuremberg S-Bahn.

== Future plans ==
There are plans for an infill station tentatively called "Neumarkt Süd" to better serve certain parts of Neumarkt in der Oberpfalz

== Network ==
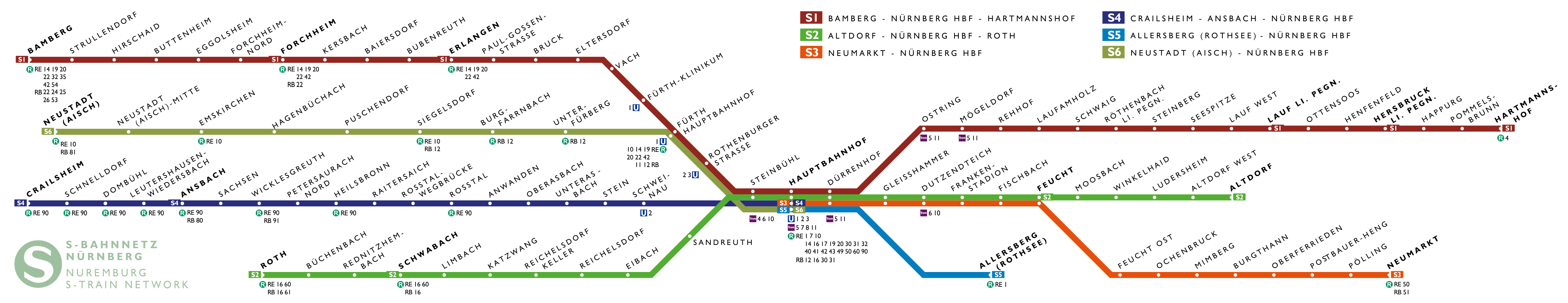
S-Bahn network map (as of Dezember 2017)
