= Nuremberg S-Bahn =

S-Bahn network

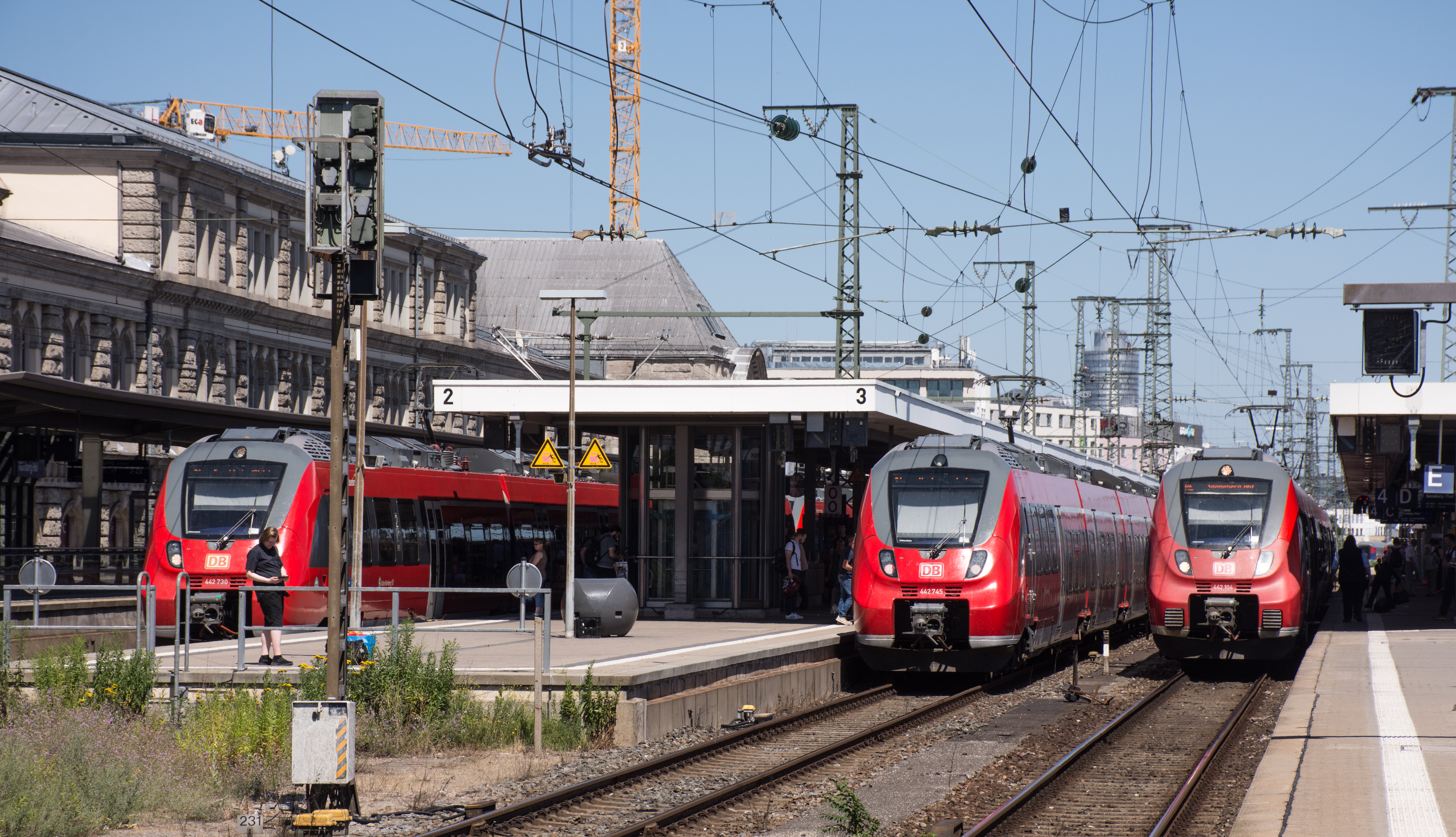
- Bombardier Talent 2 at Nürnberg Hbf

Overview
- Locale: Nuremberg
- Transit type: Rapid Transit, Regional rail
- Number of lines: 6
- Number of stations: 90
- Daily ridership: 71,233 (2019)

Operation
- Began operation: 26 September 1987
- Operator: S-Bahn Nürnberg

Technical
- System length: 320.0 km
- Track gauge: 1,435 mm (4 ft 8 1/2 in) (standard gauge)
- Electrification: 15 kV, 16.7 Hz AC Overhead lines
System map

The Nuremberg S-Bahn (German: S-Bahn Nürnberg) is an electric rapid transit network covering the region of Nuremberg, Fürth and Erlangen which started operations in 1987 and is now integrated into the Greater Nuremberg Transport Association (Verkehrsverbund Großraum Nürnberg). The full length of the five current lines is about 277.6 kilometres.

The S-Bahn trains are operated by DB Regio Mittelfranken, a subsidiary of DB Regio Bayern. From December 2018 the service was due to be taken over by National Express Germany; however, it withdrew from the bidding process on 25 October 2016, so the lines will continue to be operated by DB Regio Mittelfranken for the foreseeable future.

The service between Fürth and Erlangen-Bruck has been marred by frequent delays and service restrictions due to the slow construction for four-track expansion. No completion date is given. The original plans for the upgrade of the Nuremberg Bamberg line to four tracks called for a new alignment of S-Bahn tracks east of the current two tracks to serve a (planned but now canceled) industrial development between Nuremberg Fürth and Erlangen. The city of Fürth sued against these plans, halting the construction and leaving sections of half built track without use. As an "interim solution" switches are planned to be installed to connect existing quadruple track sections to the legacy alignment, but a completion date is not yet known.

== Current lines ==
=== Day services ===
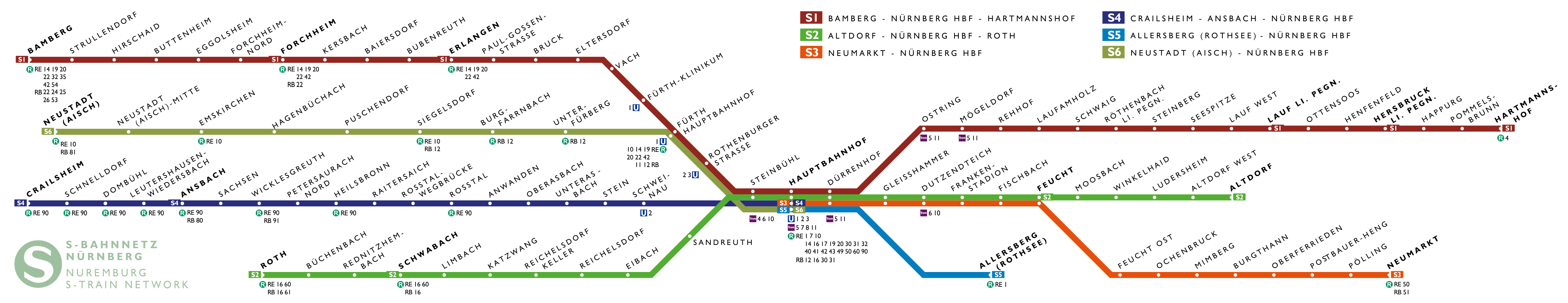
S-Bahn Nürnberg network map as displayed in trains

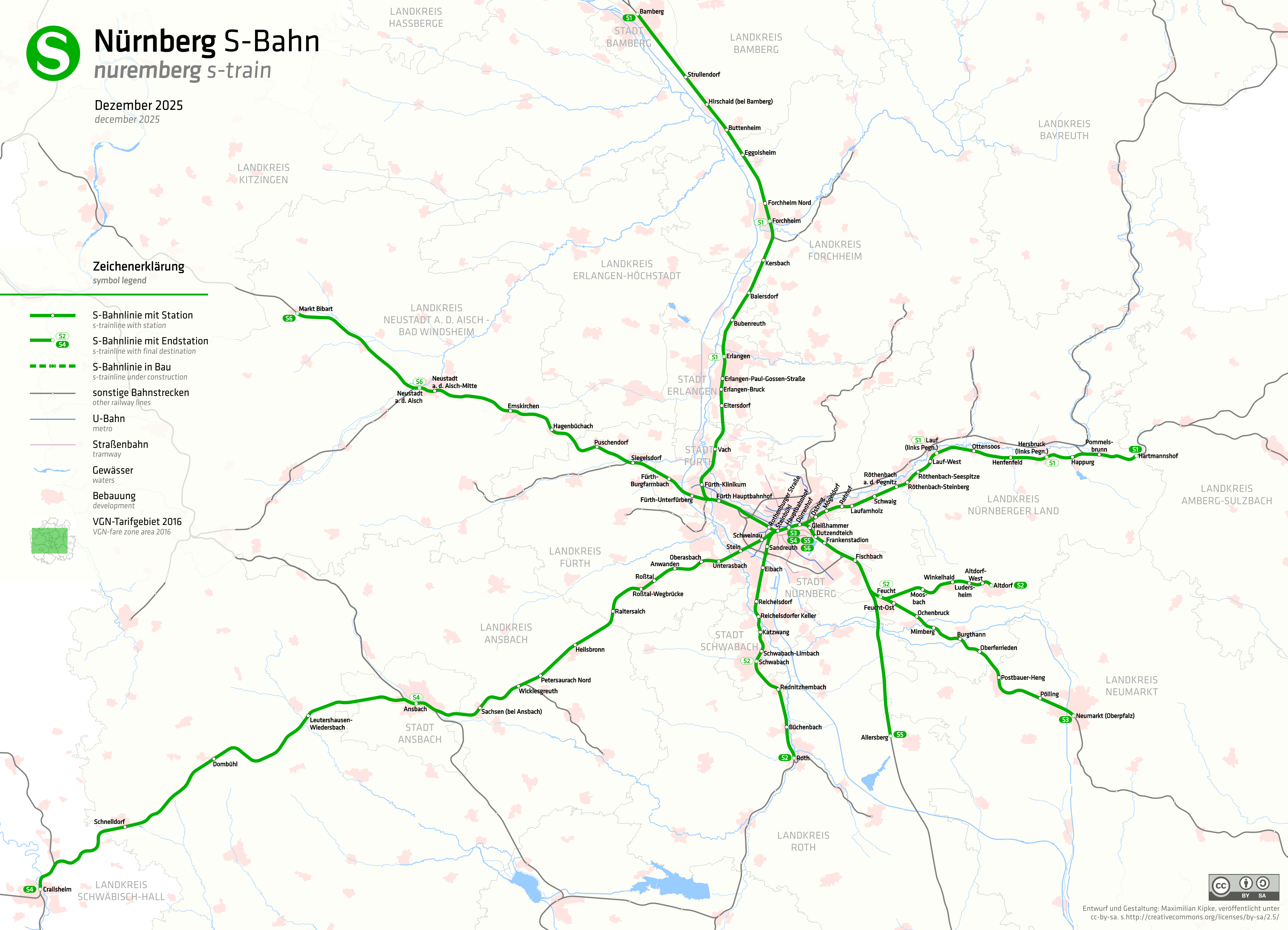
S-Bahn network

| Line | Route | Opened | Length | Stations |
|---|---|---|---|---|
| S1 | Bamberg** – Forchheim** – Erlangen** – Fürth (Bay) Hbf** – Nürnberg Hbf* – Lauf (links Pegnitz)* – Hersbruck (links Pegnitz)* – Hartmannshof* | 1987*–2010** | 99.6 km (61.9 mi) | 37 |
| S2 | Roth – Schwabach – Nürnberg Hbf – Feucht – Altdorf | 1992–2004 | 49.6 km (30.8 mi) | 23 |
| S3 | Nürnberg Hbf – Feucht – Neumarkt (Oberpf) | 1992–2010 | 36.2 km (22.5 mi) | 10 |
| S4 | Nürnberg Hbf – Ansbach – Crailsheim | 2010–2017 | 67.1 km (41.7 mi) | 18 |
| S5 | Nürnberg Hbf – Allersberg (Rothsee) | 2020 | 25.4 km (15.8 mi) | 2 |
| S6 | Nürnberg Hbf – Neustadt an der Aisch | 2021 | 55.6 km (34.5 mi) | 11 |

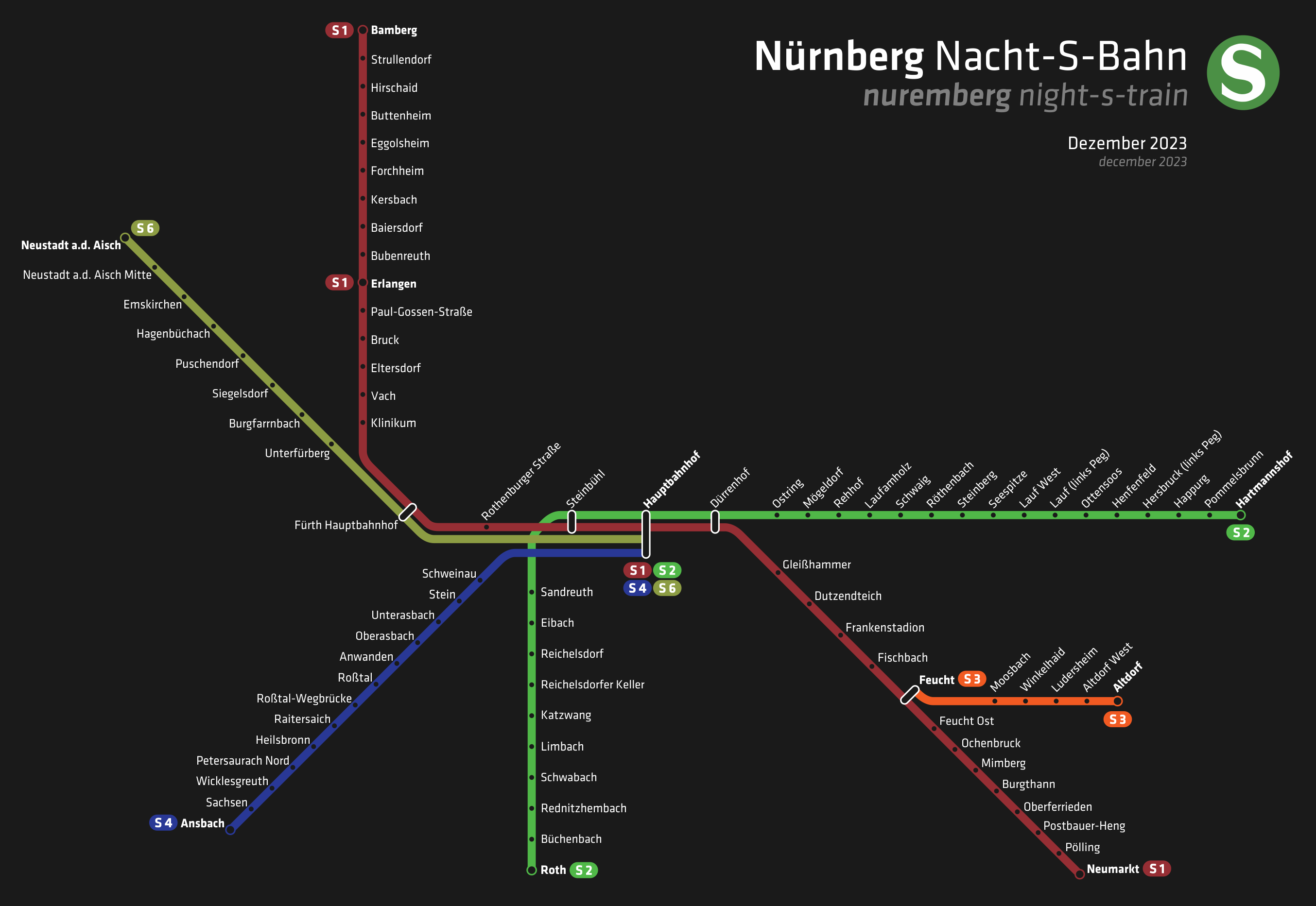
S-Bahn network by night

=== Night services ===
There is also a night service every 60 minutes between 1 a.m. and 3 a.m. on the lines S1, S2, S3, S4 and S6 on days before Saturday, Sunday and public holidays.

== Rolling stock ==
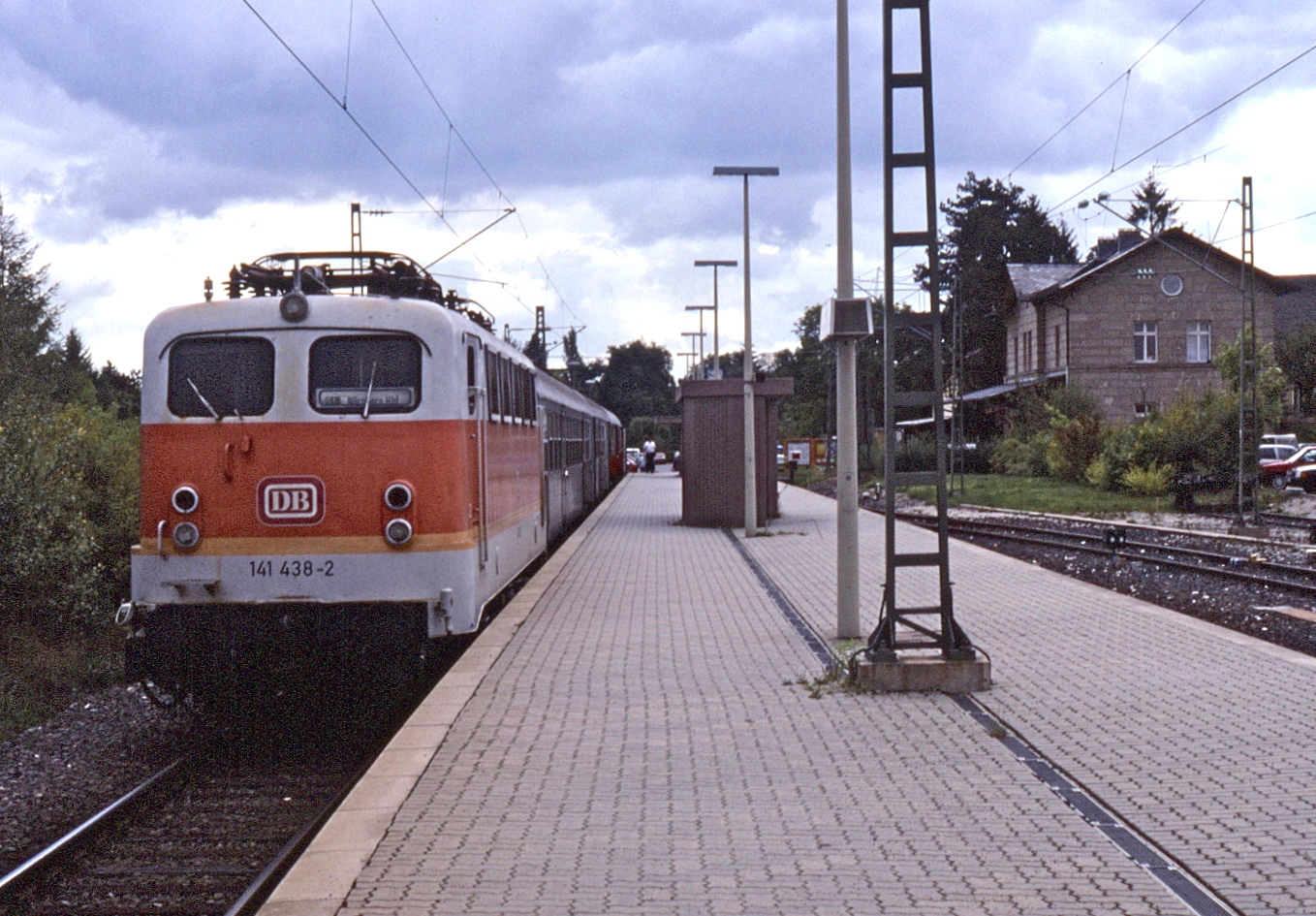
A Class 141 in S-Bahn livery in Altdorf station (1991)

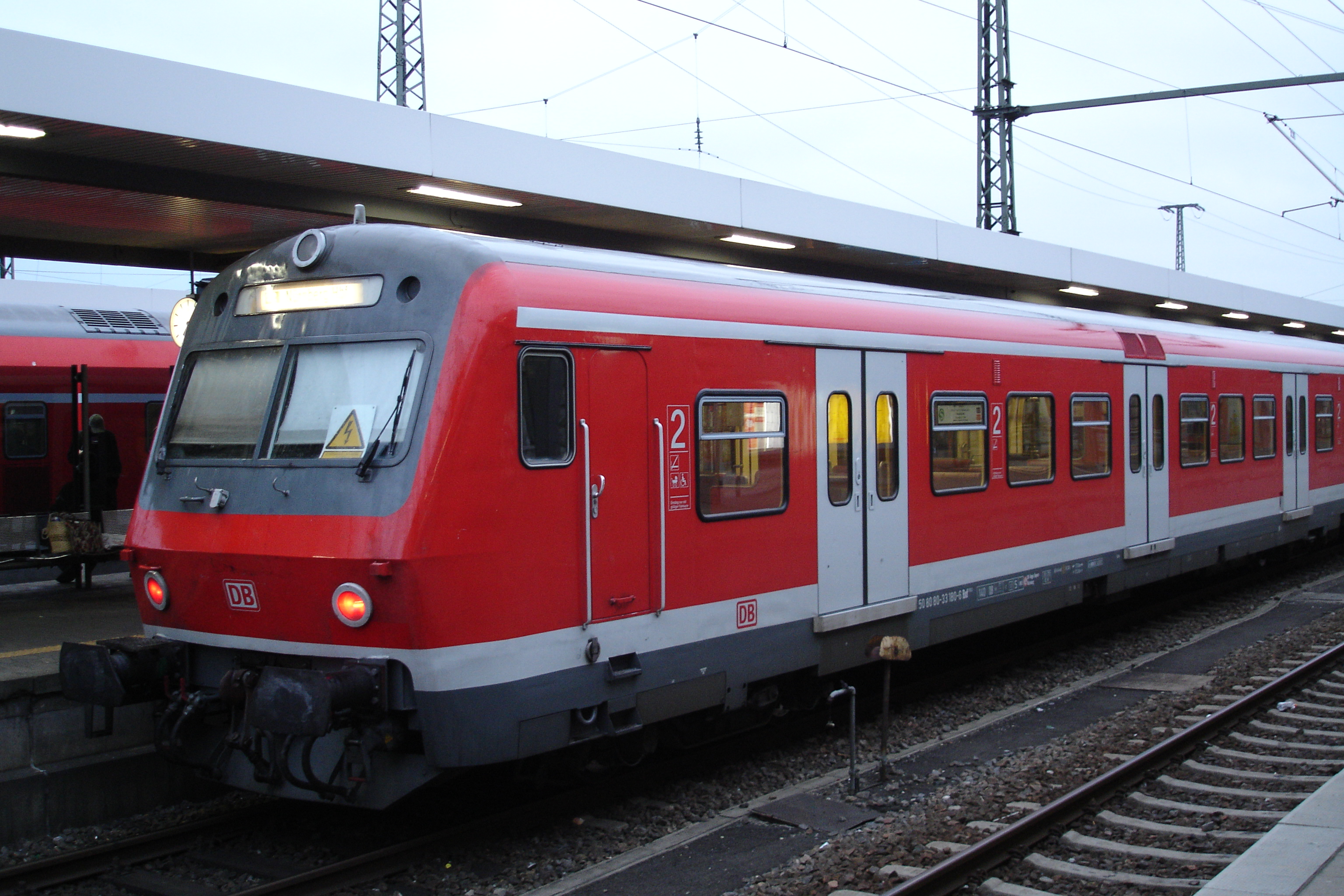
x-Wagen control car on the station Hauptbahnhof

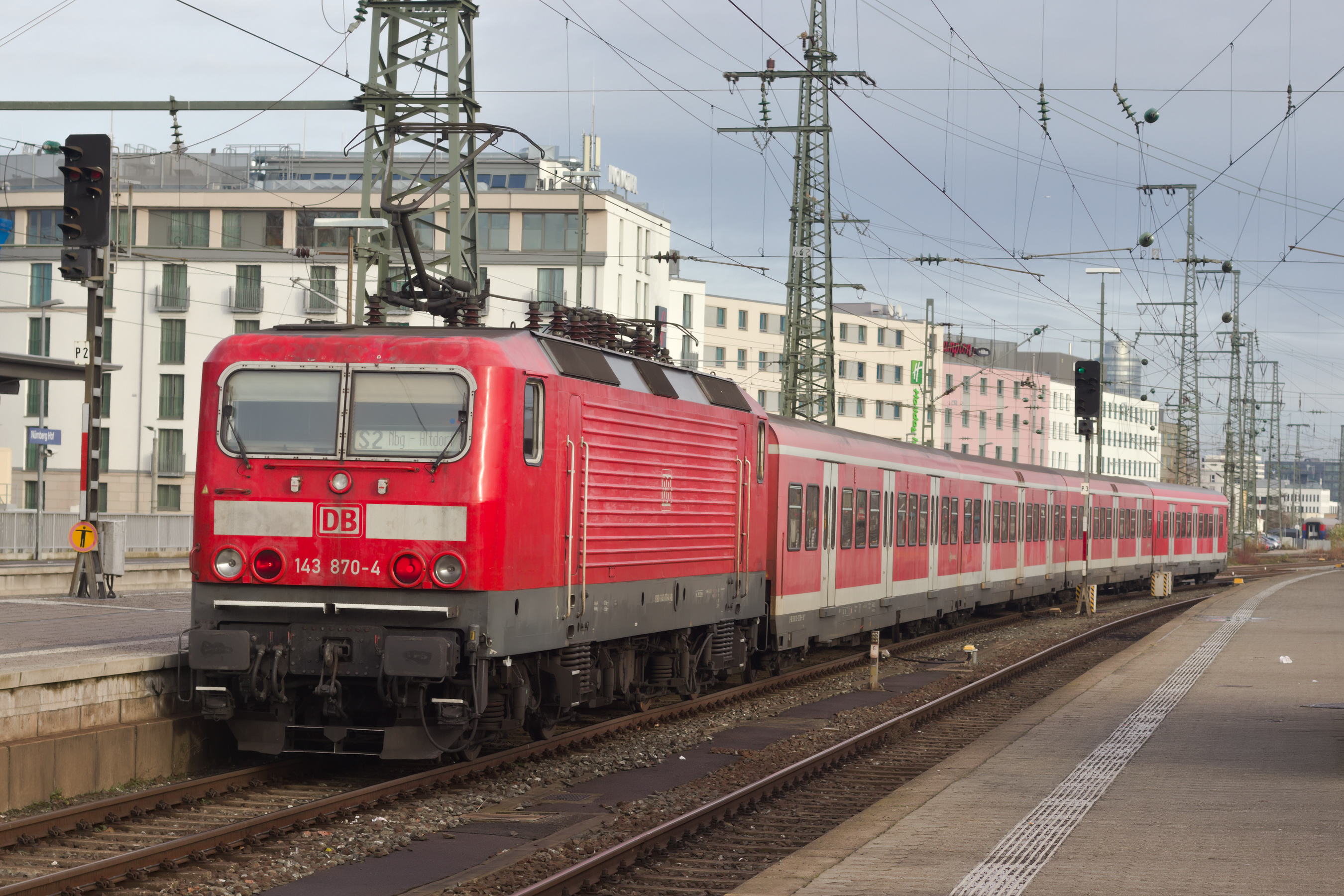
A DB Class 143 with x-Wagen coaches leaves Hauptbahnhof

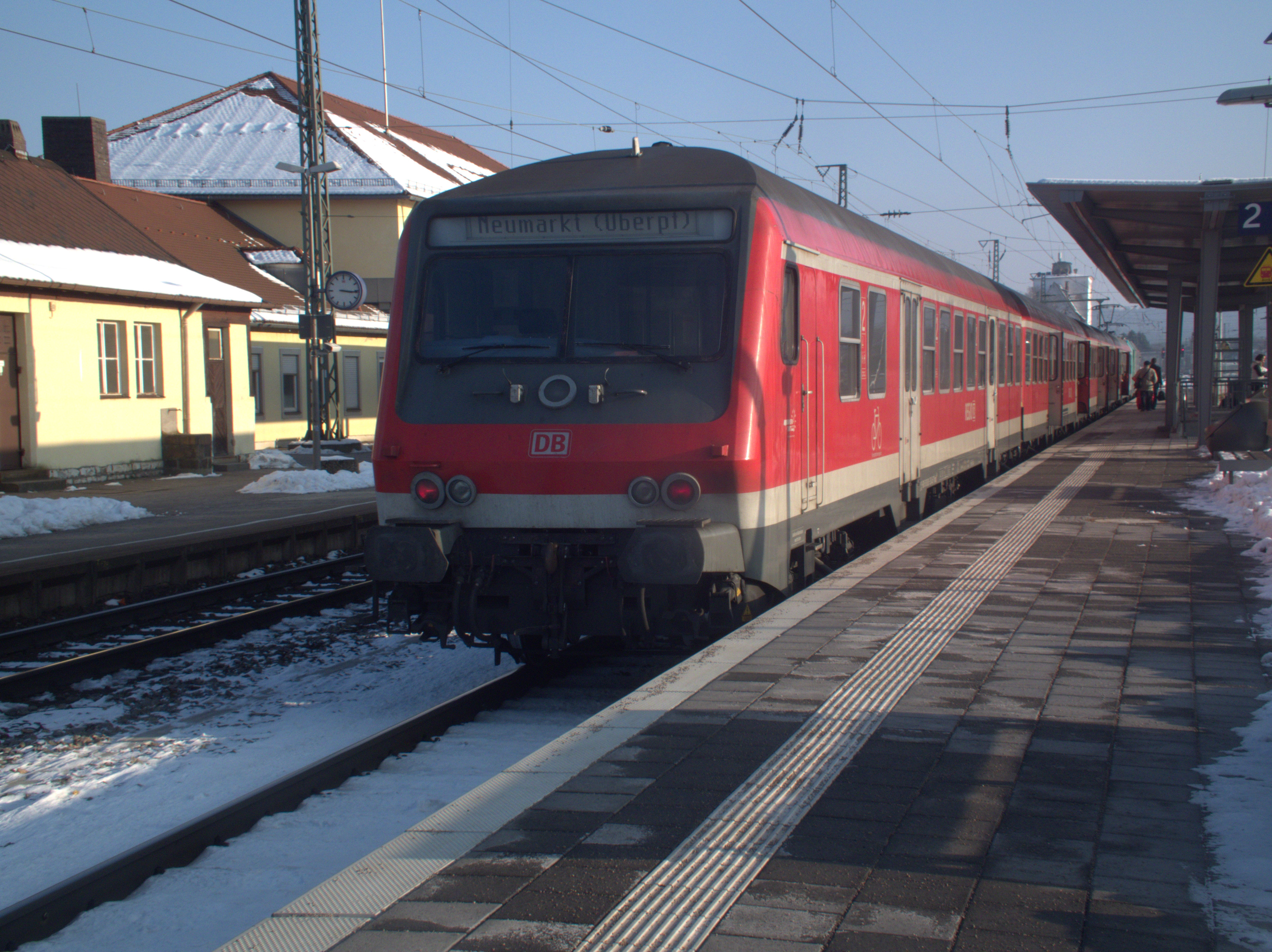
An n-Wagen train replacing the not yet delivered class 442 on the S3 (2012)

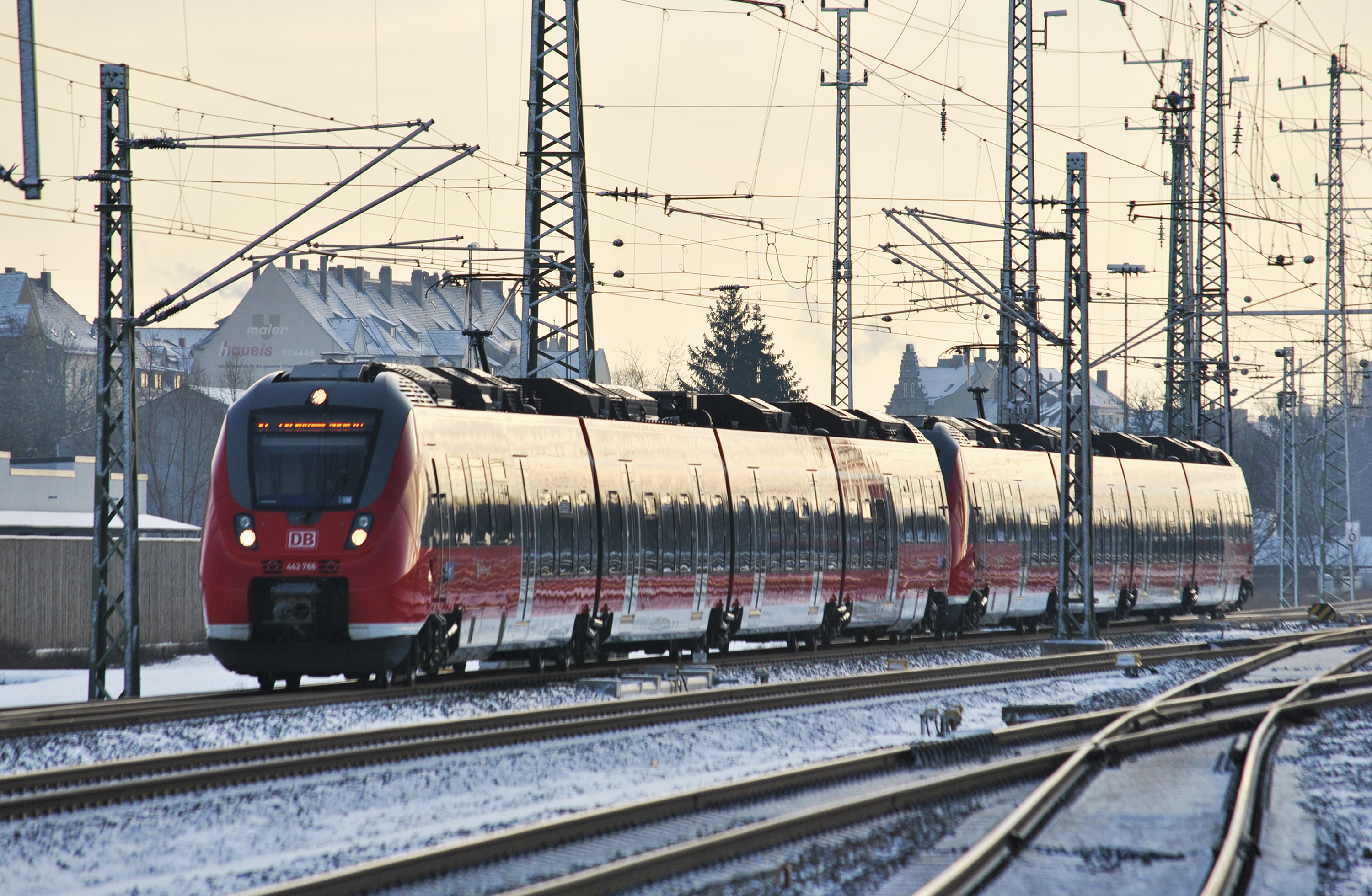
A Class 442 between Nuremberg and Fürth

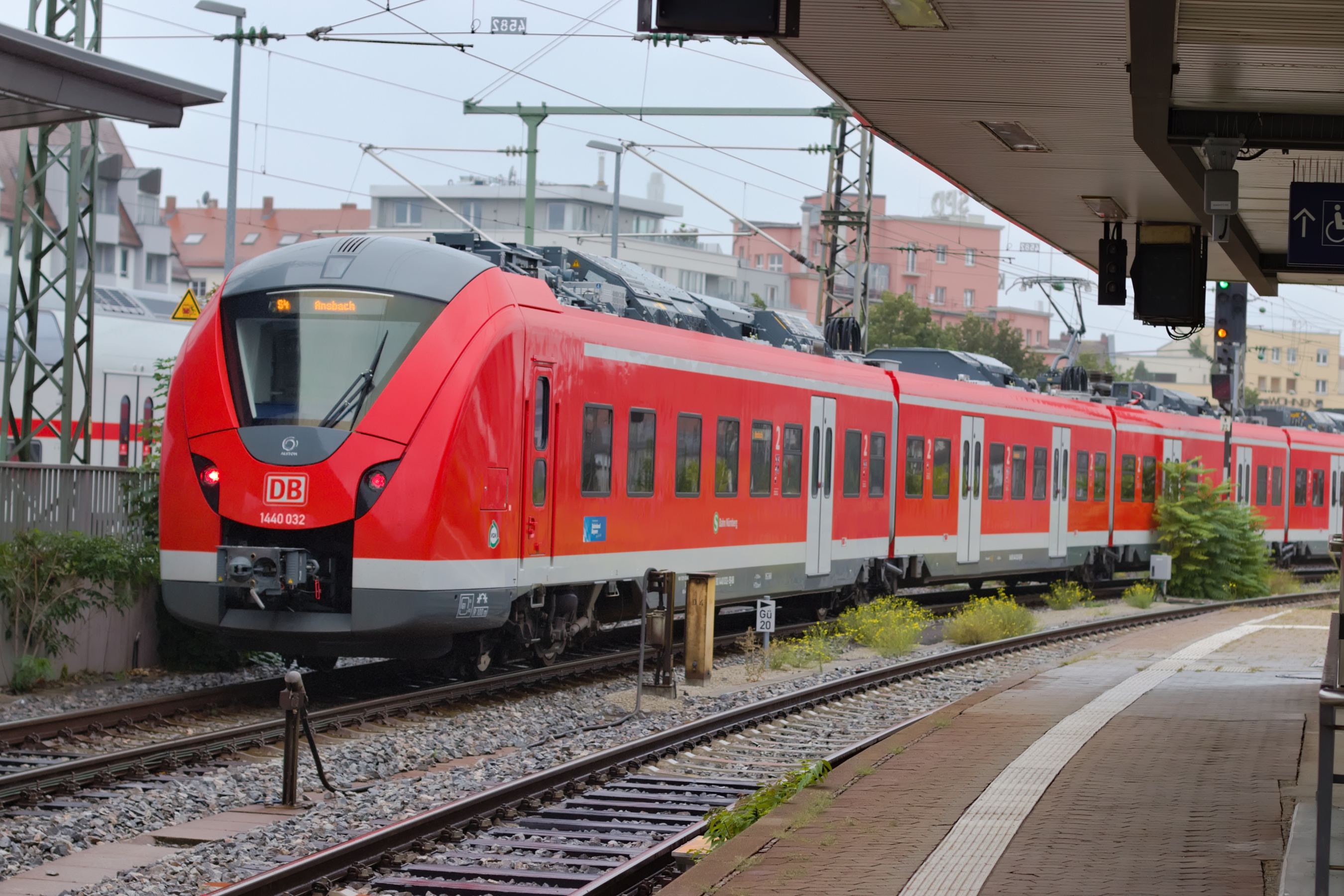
A Class 1440 train leaving Hauptbahnhof towards Ansbach

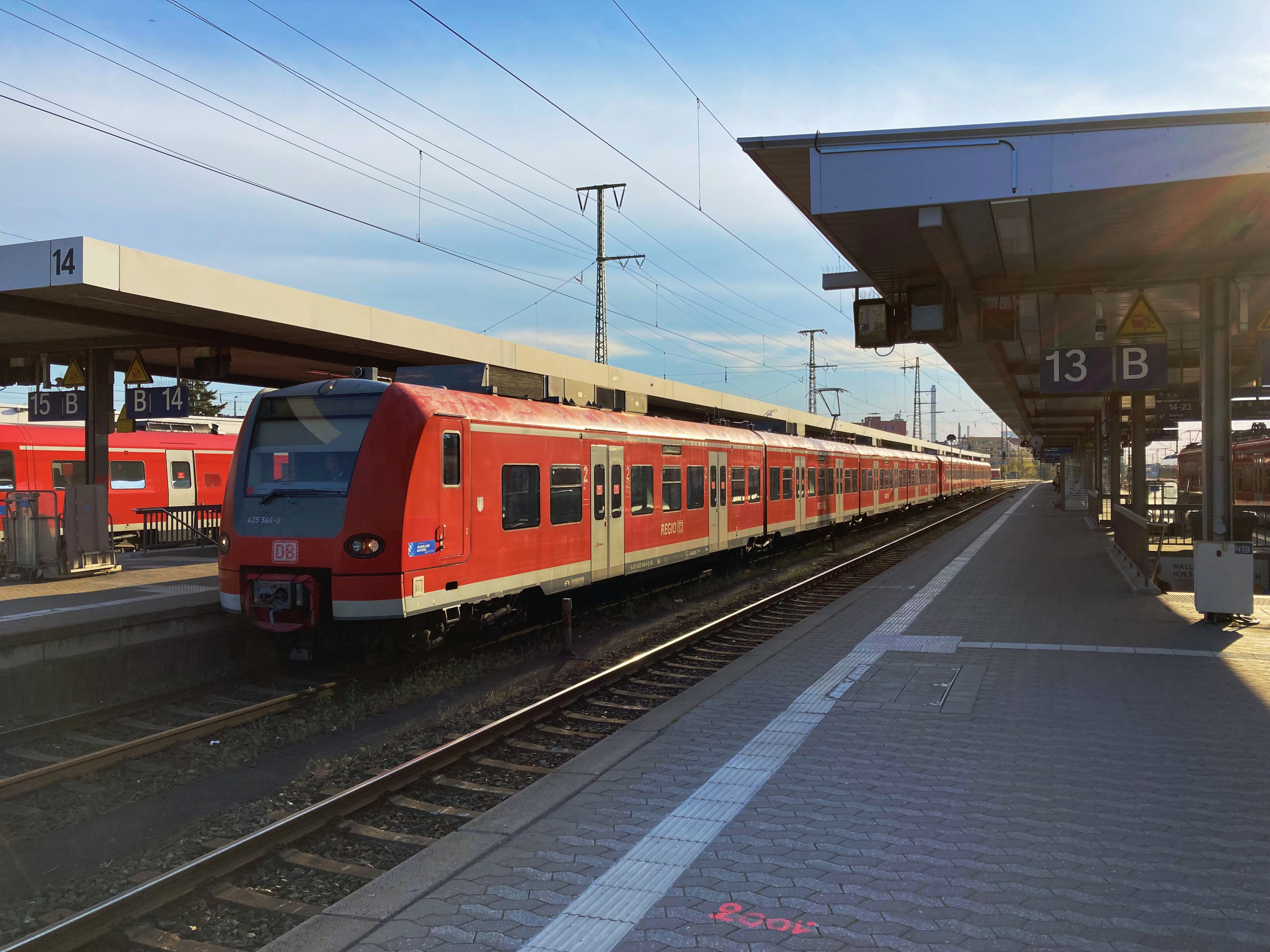
A Class 425 (1999) train leaving Hauptbahnhof towards Neustadt (Aisch)

Initially the rolling stock consisted of Class 141 locomotives, later Class 143 locomotives hauling 3–4 x-Wagen coaches. Additional commuter trains were sometimes hauled by Class 111 locos.

In 2007 electric multiple units of DB Class 442 (Bombardier Talent 2) were bought to supplement and replace the loco hauled units. They were to go into service in 2010, but due to technical problems they had to be sent back to the producer. Meanwhile n-Wagen sets with rented locomotives were used instead of them. The Class 442 finally went into service in 2012.

In late 2020 a new batch of class 1440 Alstom Coradia Continental were brought into service, replacing the last x-Wagen sets. Three x-Wagen sets will, however, be kept at least until the smaller timetable change in June 2021 for replacement and additional commuter services with Class 111 locomotives. The Class 1440 were introduced primarily on S1 where they freed up the older class 442 sets to serve other routes. A few Class 1440 sets are also used on S4 and the new S5. As the line S5 uses the Nuremberg-Ingolstadt High Speed Line, the two units used on S5 had to be equipped with LZB. A large scale advertisement campaign was launched to inform the public of the new rolling stock.

Similar to the subway, for big events the S-Bahn often lent Class 423 trains from the Munich S-Bahn to support the rather small Nuremberg fleet.

== Future expansion ==
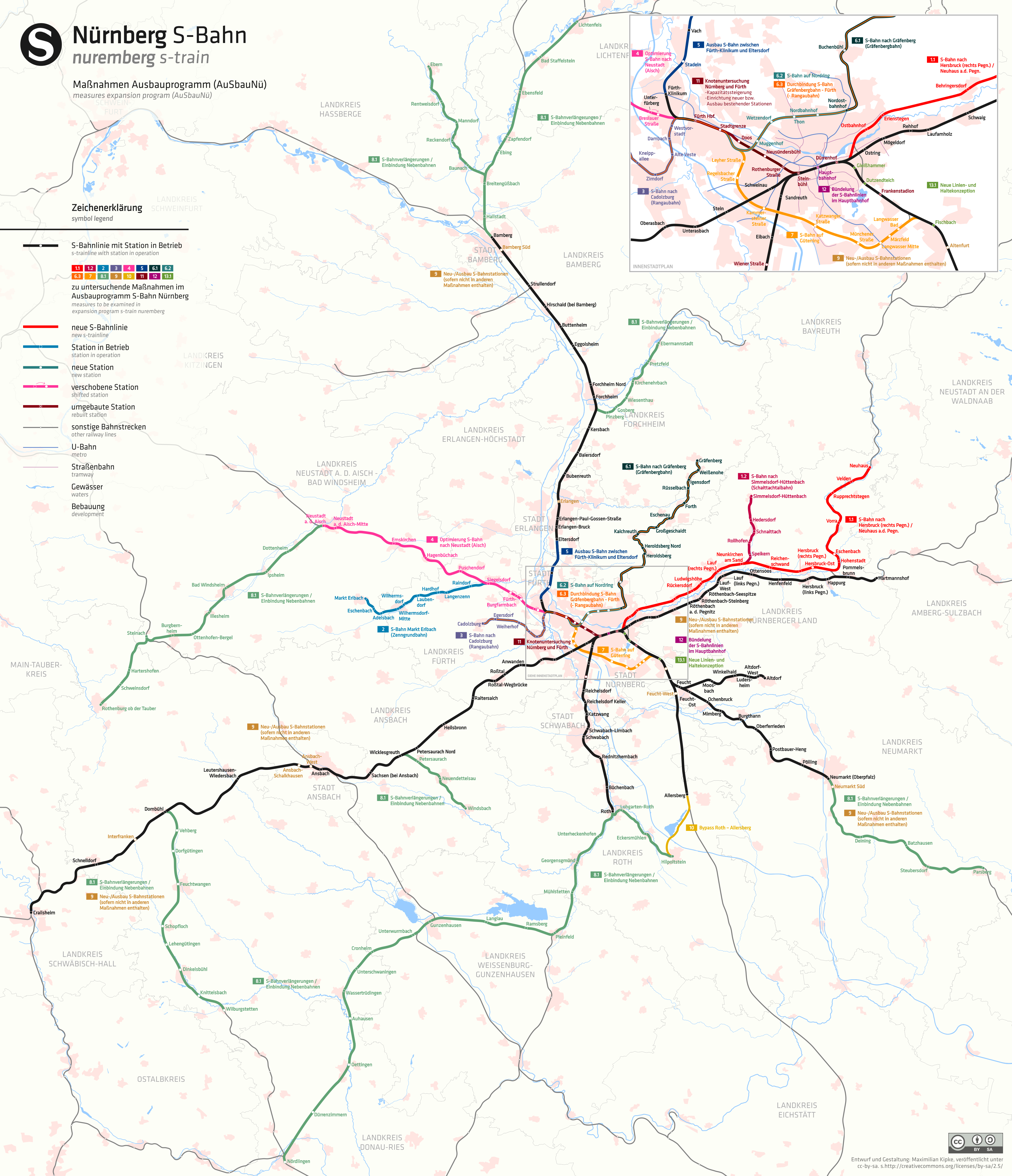
Measures to be examined in expansion program S-Bahn Nuremberg

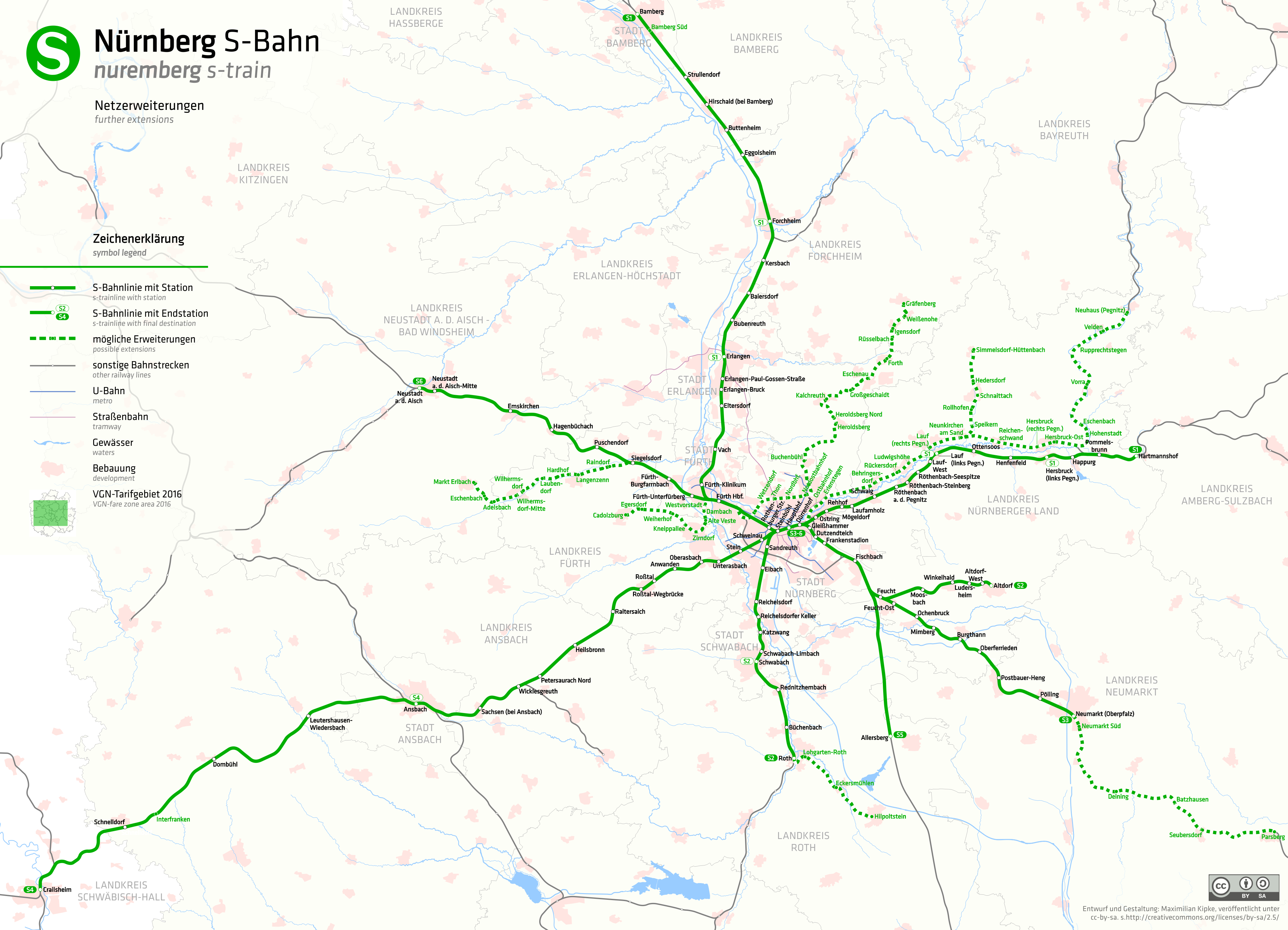
A map showing the existing network and potential extensions

While there are no plans to build entirely new railway lines to add to the S-Bahn network, plans exist to upgrade and convert some existing lines to S-Bahn standards. In the past some extensions of S-Bahn service have simply been "relabeling" of an existing service such as S5 which was previously known as the "Allersberg Express". Indeed, no S-Bahn runs on an entirely new line, but in some cases the existing lines were extended, electrified or amplified for the introduction of S-Bahn service.

=== Towards Würzburg ===
Plans include S-Bahn service along the Fürth Würzburg line which is currently one of the busiest lines in the region. In the course of Deutschlandtakt plans, a newly built high speed line is planned to enable travel times below 30 minutes between Nuremberg and Würzburg for high speed trains. This would free up capacity on the legacy alignment for more frequent service and the introduction of a "true" S-Bahn. Similar to the December 2020 switchover on "S5", there are plans to convert existing regional train service to Neustadt (Aisch) to a new "S6" with the December 2021 or the December 2022 schedule change. No changes in service pattern or additional infill stations are planned for that switchover. In late September 2021 it was announced that the new Nuremberg-Würzburg high speed line which is to include a tunnel from Nuremberg to de:Bislohe, a neighborhood annexed to Fürth in 1972, was reclassified, together with other parts of the "Deutschlandtakt" concept into the highest priority group "vordringlicher Bedarf“. The new high speed line would free up capacity on existing infrastructure allowing S-Bahn service with better frequencies.

=== Towards Markt Erlbach and Cadolzburg ===
The branch lines to Cadolzburg (Rangau Railway) and Markt Erlbach (Zenn Valley Railway) are currently not electrified and electrification is often seen as precondition for S-Bahn service along those lines. Other proposals call for the use of hydrogen powered trains or battery electric trains to replace existing diesel multiple units.

=== Towards Gräfenberg ===
There are also plans to use the (largely extant but not used for passenger service) Nuremberg Ringbahn to integrate the Gräfenberg railway (which currently terminates at Nuremberg Nordost station along the Ringbahn) into the S-Bahn network. One of several proposals calls for the linking of the aforementioned lines to Cadolzburg and Markt Erlbach via the Ringbahn. However, such plans have repeatedly failed to reach the required benefit cost ratio above 1.0.

=== Towards Crailsheim ===
In December 2020 the ministers of transportation for Baden Württemberg and Bayern announced their intention to extend the S4 from its current endpoint at Dombühl across the state line to Crailsheim with a proposed entry into service 2024. This extension opened as planned with the December 2024 schedule change.

=== Towards Neuhaus (Pegnitz) and Simmelsdorf-Hüttenbach ===
In the course of the planned electrification of the Nuremberg Cheb railway there are also plans to establish S-Bahn service along this line. In the course of this expansion it is also planned to offer S-Bahn service along the branch line to Simmelsdorf-Hüttenbach (Schnaittach Valley Railway) In April 2021 a planning agreement between the State of Bavaria and Deutsche Bahn concerning the planning of S-Bahn service along the (to be electrified) right Pegnitz railway and the Schnaittach Valley Railway was signed. In the course of S-Bahn expansion, two new infill stations are planned: Hersbruck-East and "Eschenbach" in the borough of Pommelsbrunn of that name.

=== Towards Hilpoltstein ===
Local politicians repeatedly demand to electrify the 11 km of the Roth Greding railway currently still in service and to extend S-Bahn service currently terminating in Roth along that line. A further precondition for S-Bahn service besides electrification is the upgrade or removal of at least some of the 22 level crossings along that line. A feasibility study ordered by the city of Hilpoltstein was released in 2020. Costs for the necessary electrification and associated upgrades to allow speeds up to 80 km/h (instead of the current 60 km/h speed limit) were given as 24 million € in 2020. In 2021 local farmers raised objections to the proposed closure of several level crossings as they were their principal users.

=== Infill stations ===
Throughout the history of the S-Bahn, there have been a number of infill stations built along existing right of way to better serve certain areas. There are plans for a couple of infill stations, among them "Neumarkt Süd" (S3) "Bamberg Süd" (S1) and "Forchheim Nord" (S1)

== Interchanges with other systems ==
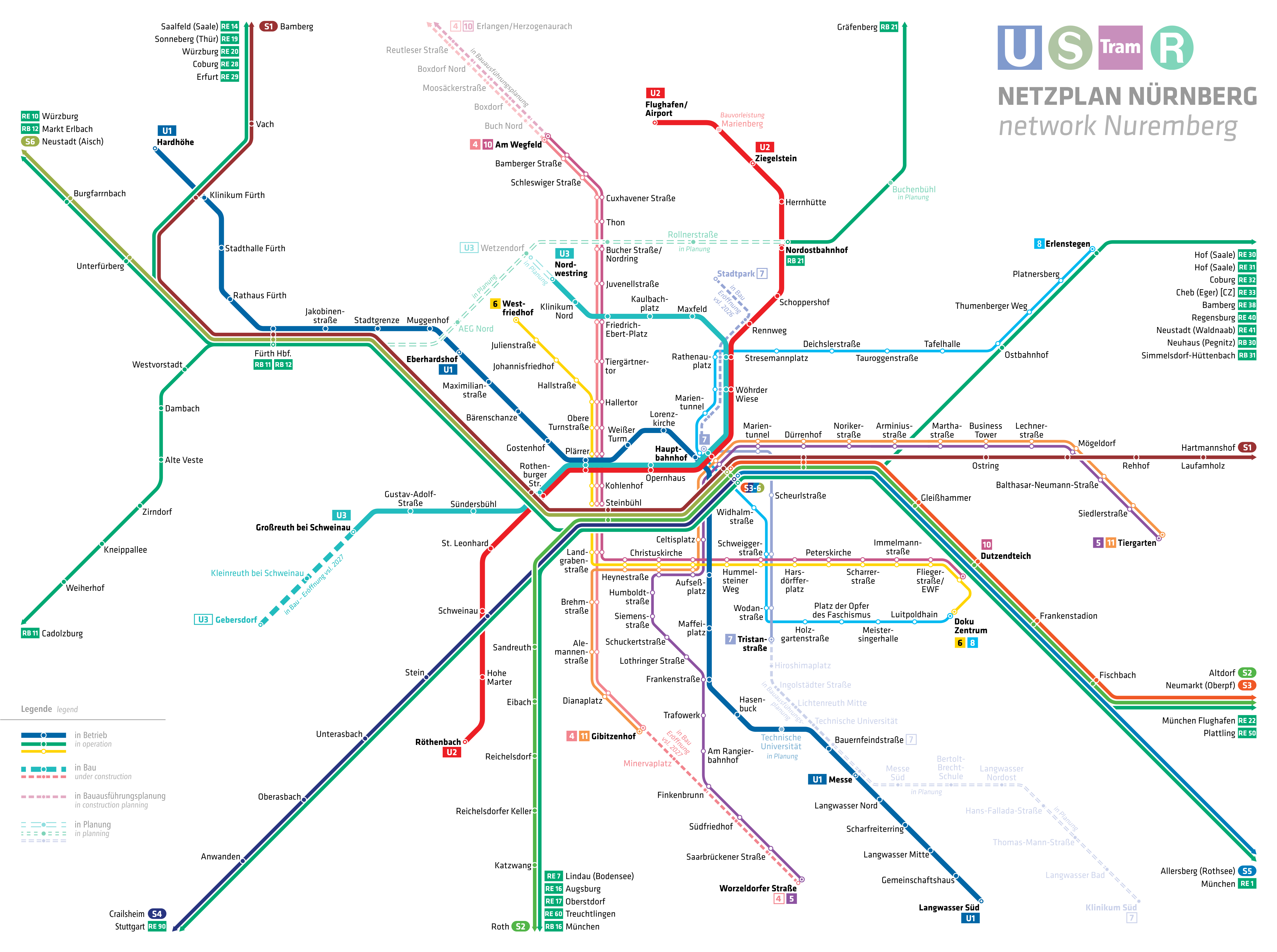
U-, S-Bahn and tramway network in Nuremberg and Fürth

All S-Bahn stops are also served by buses.

=== U-Bahn S-Bahn interchanges ===
There are multiple interchanges with the Nuremberg U-Bahn in both Nuremberg and Fürth, including at the stations Fürth Hauptbahnhof (U1/S1&S6), Nuremberg Hauptbahnhof (all U-Bahn and S-Bahn lines), Fürth Klinikum / Unterfarrnbach (U1/S1), Nuremberg Rothenburger Straße (U2/U3 and S1), Nürnberg-Schweinau station (S4 / U2).

=== Straßenbahn Nuremberg interchanges ===
There are interchanges between the S-Bahn and Straßenbahn Nürnberg at Nürnberg-Steinbühl station (S1, S2 / Tram lines 4 and 6) Nürnberg-Dürrenhof (S1, S2 / Tram line 5), Nürnberg-Ostring station (S1 / Tram line 5), Nürnberg-Mögeldorf station (S1 / Tram line 5), Nürnberg-Dutzendteich station (S2 / Tram line 6). Some extensions of the S-Bahn network would include interchanges to existing Tram services in the vicinity. The de:Stadt-Umland-Bahn Nürnberg–Erlangen–Herzogenaurach is to include an interchange at Erlangen Hauptbahnhof when built.

== See also ==
- Nuremberg U-Bahn
- Trams in Nuremberg
- U1 (Nuremberg U-Bahn)
- U2 (Nuremberg U-Bahn)
- U3 (Nuremberg U-Bahn)
