= S2 (Nuremberg) =

Overview
- Locale: Nuremberg

Service
- System: Nuremberg S-Bahn
- Operator(s): DB Regio Franken
- Rolling stock: DB Class 442 (Bombardier Talent 2)

The S2 is a service on the Nuremberg S-Bahn. It is 49.6 km (30.8 mi) long and runs from Roth via several stops in Nuremberg proper to Hartmannshof.

== Network ==
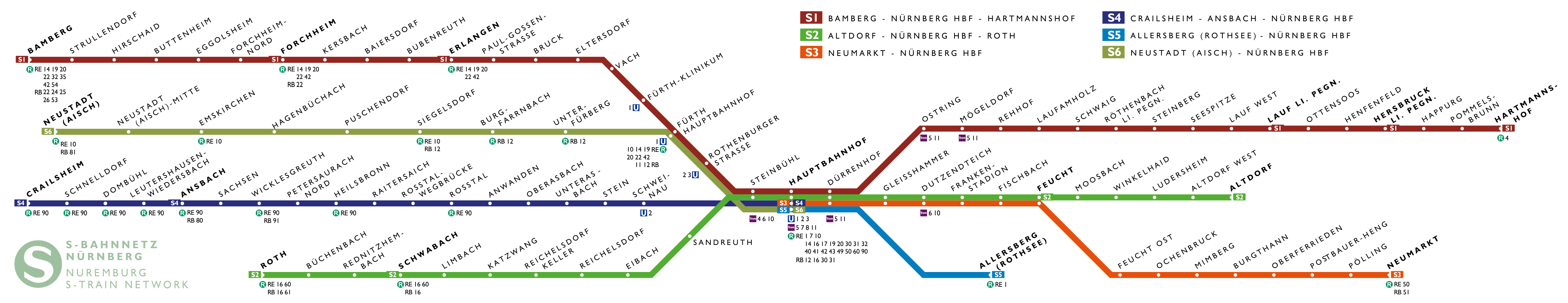
S-Bahn network map (as of Dezember 2017)
