= List of railway stations in Bavaria =

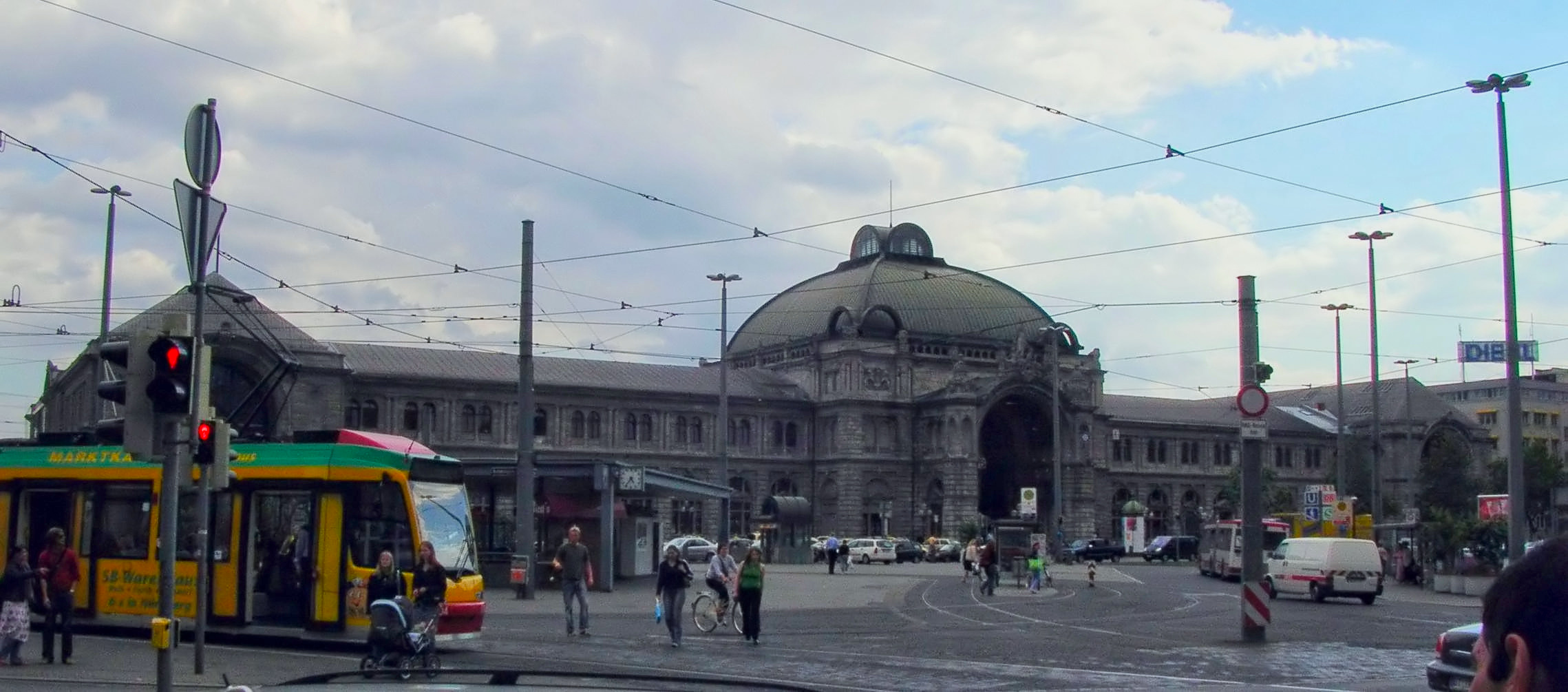
Nürnberg Hauptbahnhof

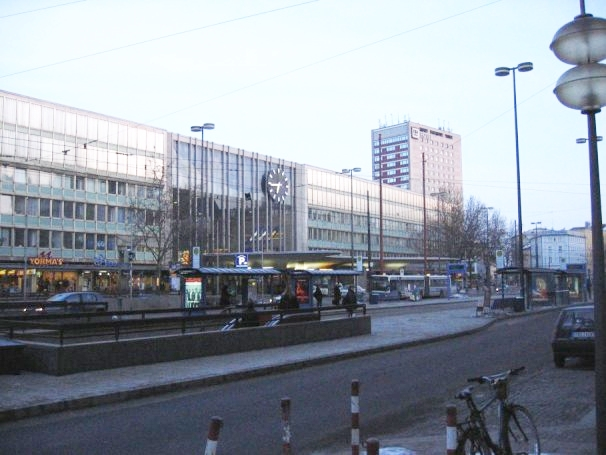
München Hauptbahnhof

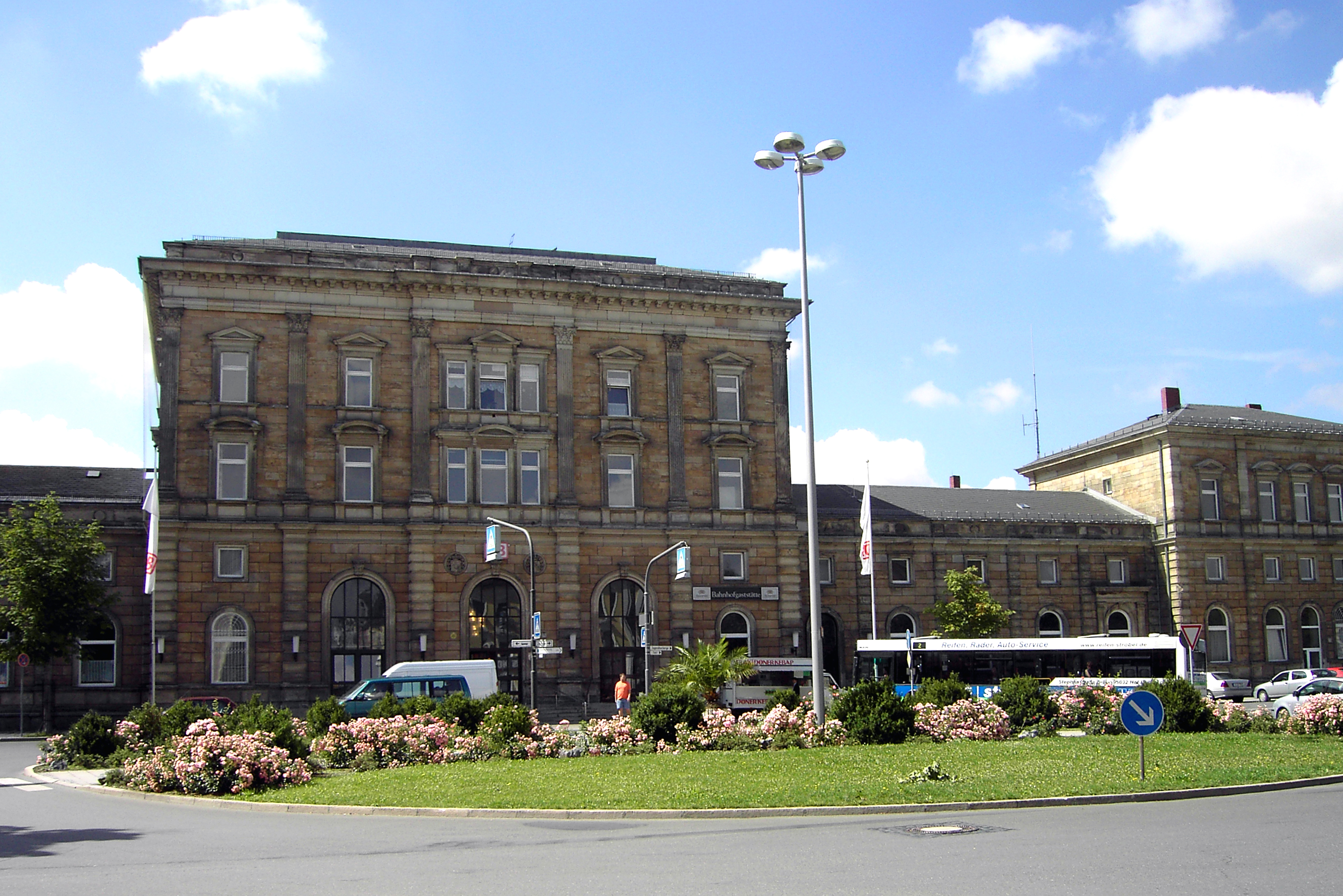
Hof Hauptbahnhof

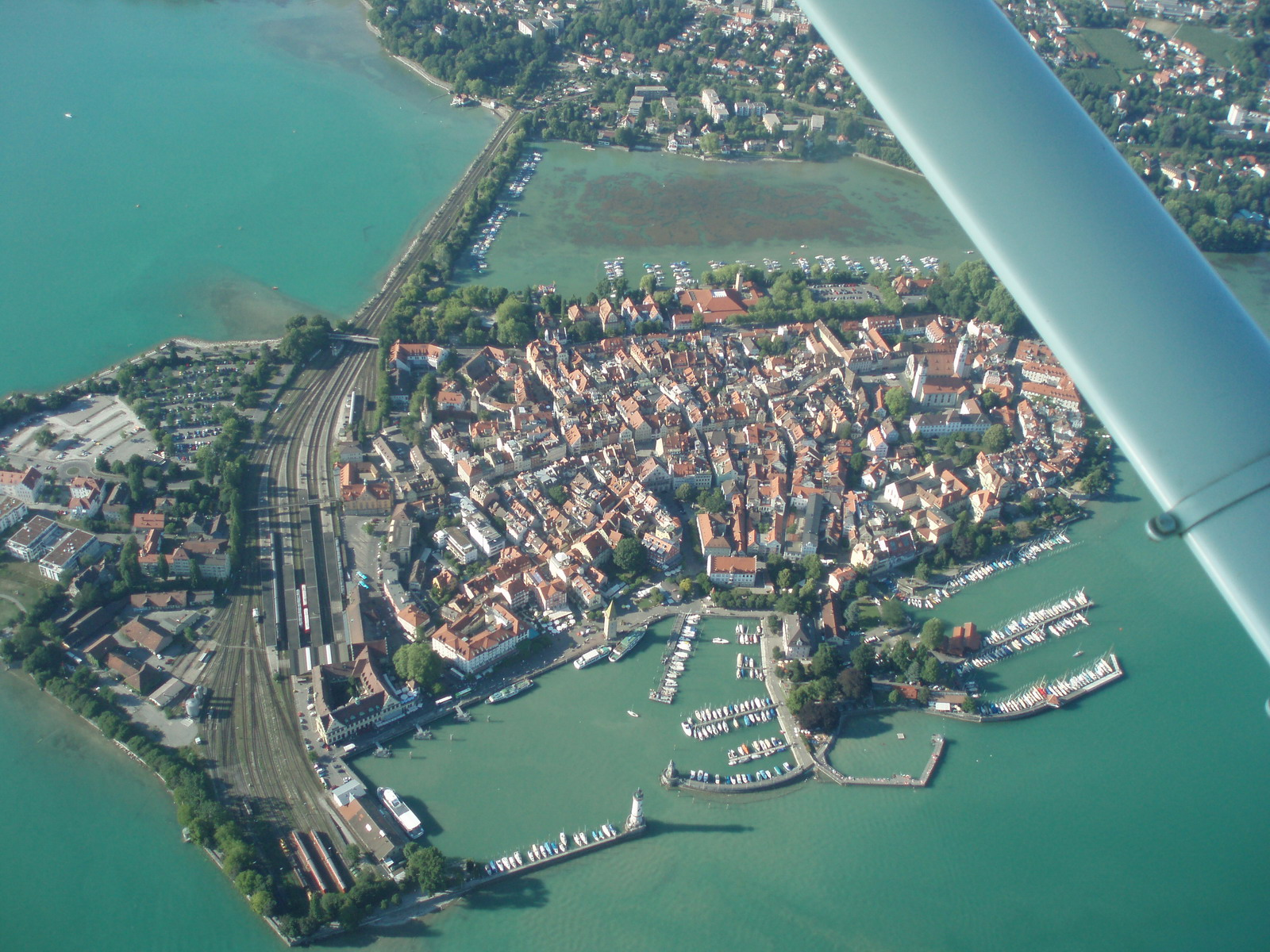
Lindau Hauptbahnhof

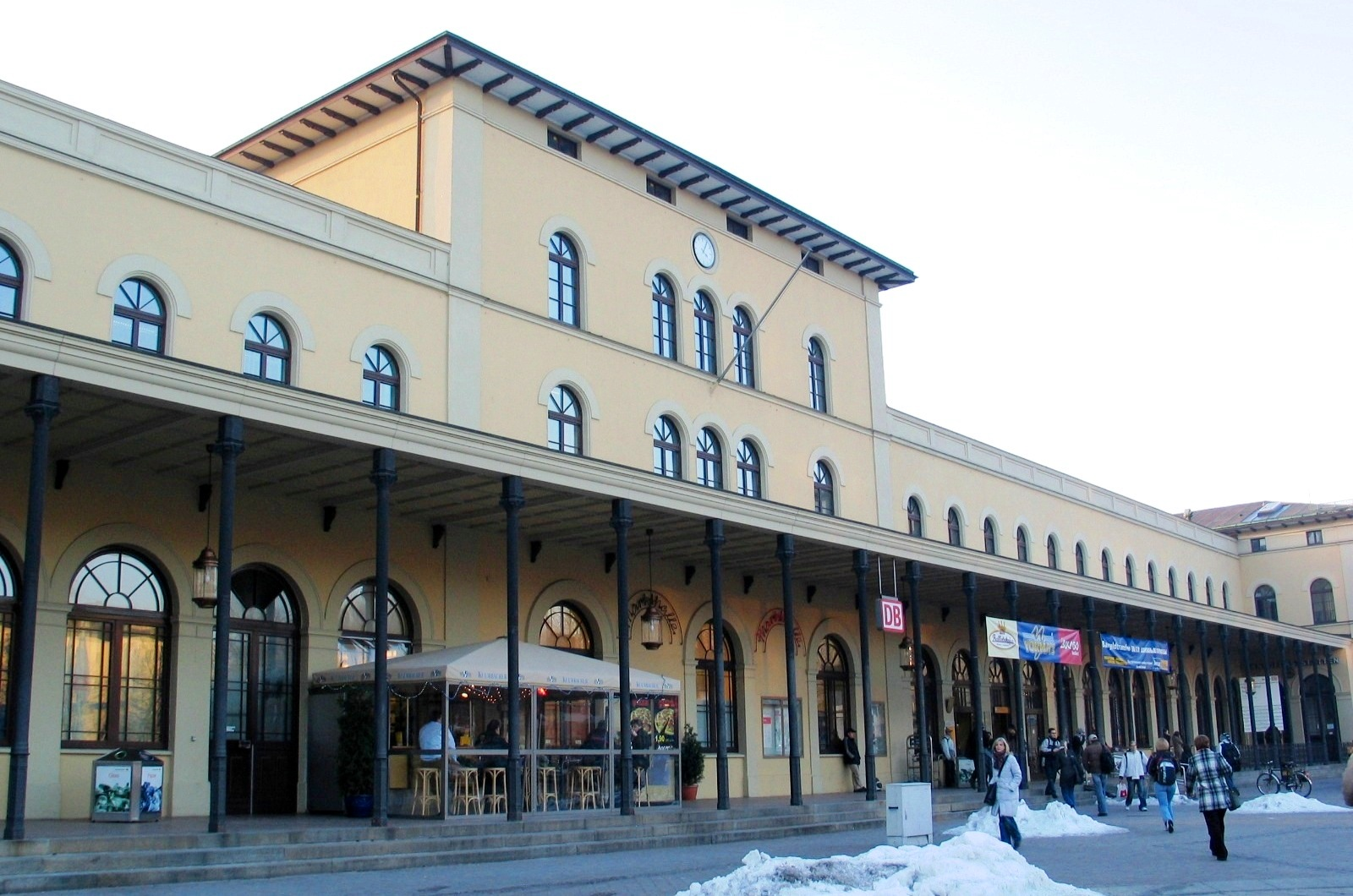
Augsburg Hauptbahnhof has the oldest station building in Germany still in use today

Current stations operated by DB Station&Service in Bavaria:

Station No.	Place	Category (2011)
0034	Aichach	5
0036	Ainring	6
0099	Allersberg (Rothsee)	6
0075	Altdorf (b Nürnberg)	6
0076	Altdorf West (b Nürnberg)	6
0094	Altenerding	6
0126	Altomünster	6
0134	Amberg	5
0139	Ampfing	5
0161	Ansbach	3
0187	Aschaffenburg Hbf	2
0216	Aufhausen (b Erding)	6
0219	Augsburg Haunstetterstraße	3
0220	Augsburg Hbf	2
7996	Augsburg Messe	6
0222	Augsburg Morellstraße	6
0223	Augsburg-Hochzoll	3
0224	Augsburg-Oberhausen	4
0233	Aying	6
0246	Bad Aibling	5
0274	Bad Endorf (Oberbay)	5
0288	Bad Kissingen	5
0321	Bad Reichenhall	5
5963	Bad Staffelstein	5
0357	Bad Tölz	6
0377	Baierbrunn	6
0379	Baiersdorf	5
0382	Baldham	5
0393	Bamberg	2
0435	Bayerisch Eisenstein	6
0439	Bayreuth Hbf	3
0491	Beratzhausen	5
0495	Berchtesgaden Hbf	5
0634	Biessenhofen	5
0717	Bobingen	4
0828	Brannenburg	4
0852	Breitengüssbach	5
0912	Bruckmühl	6
0933	Buchenau (Oberbay)	5
0934	Büchenbach	5
0935	Buchenhain	6
0944	Buchloe	3
0980	Burgbernheim	7
0998	Burgthann	5
1037	Cham (Oberpf)	4
1059	Coburg	4
1099	Dachau	3
1100	Dachau Stadt	6
1149	Deggendorf Hbf	5
1153	Deisenhofen	4
1182	Dettingen (Main)	5
1196	Diedorf (Schwab)	5
1220	Dingolfing	5
1222	Dinkelscherben	5
1259	Dombühl	5
1265	Donauwörth	4
1268	Dorfen Bahnhof	5
1396	Dürrnhaar	6
1428	Ebenhausen (Unterfr)	5
1429	Ebenhausen-Schäftlarn	6
1440	Ebersberg (Oberbay)	5
1442	Ebersdorf (b Coburg)	5
1450	Eching	5
1481	Eglharting	4
1498	Eichenau (Oberbay)	5
1504	Eichstätt station	4
1571	Eltersdorf	5
1591	Emskirchen	5
1626	Erding	6
1650	Erlangen	3
1651	Erlangen-Bruck	5
1675	Eschenau (Mittelfr)	6
1720	Esting	4
1765	Fasanenpark	5
1770	Feldafing	5
1774	Feldkirchen (b München)	5
1783	Feucht	3
1784	Feucht-Moosbach	6
8140	Feucht Ost	6
1797	Fischbach (b Nürnberg)	6
1803	Fischen	5
1822	Flughafen München	4
1823	Flughafen München Besucherpark	4
1830	Forchheim (Oberfr)	4
1906	Freilassing	3
1908	Freising	3
1929	Friedberg (b Augsburg)	6
1977	Fürstenfeldbruck	4
1983	Furth (b Deisenhofen)	5
1984	Fürth (Bay) Hbf	2
1988	Fürth-Burgfarrnbach	5
1990	Fürth-Unterfarrnbach	5
1992	Füssen	6
2014	Garmisch-Partenkirchen	3
2024	Gauting	4
2040	Geisenbrunn	5
2058	Geltendorf	3
2060	Gemünden (Main)	4
2071	Georgensgmünd	4
2091	Germering-Unterpfaffenhofen	4
2094	Gernlinden	4
2110	Gessertshausen	5
2124	Gilching-Argelsried	5
2227	Gräfelfing	4
2240	Grafing station	3
2241	Grafing Stadt	5
2243	Grafrath	5
2281	Gröbenzell	4
2290	Gronsdorf	4
2349	Grosshesselohe Isartal	5
2376	Grub (Oberbay)	5
2422	Günzburg	3
2424	Gunzenhausen	4
2443	Haar	4
2497	Hallbergmoos	5
8194	Happurg	6
2570	Harthaus	5
2574	Hartmannshof	5
2582	Hassfurt	4
6515	Hebertshausen	5
2647	Heigenbrücken	5
2657	Heilsbronn	5
2663	Heimstetten	5
2709	Hergatz	5
2724	Heroldsberg	6
2732	Herrsching	5
2734	Hersbruck (right bank of the Pegnitz)	4
2784	Hirschaid	6
2818	Hof Hbf	3
2835	Hohenbrunn	5
2847	Höhenkirchen-Siegertsbrunn	5
2858	Hohenschäftlarn	6
2873	Höllriegelskreuth	6
2888	Holzkirchen	3
2963	Icking	6
2972	Illertissen	5
2986	Immenstadt	4
2988	Indersdorf	6
2993	Ingolstadt Hbf	3
2994	Ingolstadt Nord	2
2997	Inningen	6
3010	Ismaning	4
3078	Kahl (Main)	4
3114	Karlstadt (Main)	4
3138	Katzwang	6
3141	Kaufbeuren	4
3142	Kaufering	4
3155	Kempten (Allgäu) Hbf	3
3156	Kempten (Allgäu) Ost	6
4245	Kinding (Altmühltal)	6
3187	Kirchenlaibach	4
3204	Kirchseeon	4
3210	Kissing	4
3212	Kitzingen	5
	Klais	6
3235	Klein Ostheim	5
3312	Kolbermoor	6
3419	Kreuzstrasse	6
3427	Kronach	4
3458	Kulmbach	4
3509	Landsberg (Lech)	6
3510	Landsberg (Lech) Schule	6
3513	Landshut (Bay) Hbf	2
3584	Lauf (left bank of Pegnitz)	4
3585	Lauf (right bank of Pegnitz)	5
3586	Lauf West	6
3629	Leipheim	5
3700	Lichtenfels	3
3727	Lindau Hbf	3
3757	Lochham	4
3764	Lohhof	5
3770	Lohr Bahnhof	4
3831	Ludersheim	6
3909	Maisach	4
3911	Malching (Oberbay)	6
4299	Mammendorf	4
3971	Markt Schwaben	3
3977	Marktoberdorf	6
3979	Marktredwitz	3
4038	Meitingen	5
4049	Mellrichstadt	6
4051	Memmingen	3
4064	Mering	3
4073	Mertingen Bahnhof	5
4102	Miesbach	6
4119	Mindelheim	6
4134	Mittenwald	4
4172	Moosburg	4
	Mühldorf (Oberbayern)	4
4227	Münchberg	5
4231	München Donnersbergerbrücke	3
4233	München Harras	4
4234	München Hbf	1
4235	München Heimeranplatz	4
4236	München Isartor	4
4237	München Karlsplatz	3
4238	München Leienfelsstrasse	5
4239	München Leuchtenbergring	4
4240	München Marienplatz	3
4241	München Ost	1
4242	München Rosenheimer Platz	4
4244	München Siemenswerke	5
4243	München St.-Martin-Straße	5
4246	München-Allach	4
4247	München-Aubing	5
4248	München-Berg am Laim	5
4249	München-Daglfing	5
4250	München-Englschalking	5
4251	München-Fasanerie	5
4252	München-Fasangarten	5
4253	München-Feldmoching	5
4255	München-Giesing	3
4232	München-Hackerbrücke	3
4256	München-Johanneskirchen	5
4257	München-Karlsfeld	4
4258	München-Laim Pbf	3
4259	München-Langwied	4
4260	München-Lochhausen	5
4261	München-Mittersendling	5
4262	München-Moosach	4
4263	München-Neuaubing	5
4264	München-Neuperlach Süd	5
4265	München-Obermenzing	4
4266	München-Pasing	2
4267	München-Perlach	5
4268	München-Riem Pbf	4
4269	München-Solln	5
4270	München-Trudering	5
2512	München-Untermenzing	4
4271	München-Westkreuz	4
4284	Murnau	4
4341	Nersingen	6
4357	Neu Ulm	4
4362	Neubiberg	4
4384	Neuenmarkt-Wirsberg	4
4389	Neufahrn (b Freising)	4
4390	Neufahrn (Niederbay)	5
4395	Neugilching	5
4396	Neuhaus (Pegnitz)	5
4406	Neukirchen (bei Sulzbach-Rosenberg)	5
4416	Neumarkt (Oberpf)	3
4428	Neunkirchen a Sand	5
4435	Neusäss	5
4443	Neustadt (Aisch) Bahnhof	4
4518	Niederroth	7
4572	Nordendorf	5
4580	Nördlingen	5
4593	Nuremberg Hbf	1
4594	Nürnberg Nordost	6
4597	Nürnberg-Dürrenhof	5
4598	Nürnberg-Dutzendteich	5
4599	Nürnberg-Eibach	5
4601	Nürnberg Frankenstadion	4
4602	Nürnberg-Gleisshammer	5
4603	Nürnberg-Laufamholz	5
4604	Nürnberg-Mögeldorf	5
4606	Nürnberg-Ostring	6
4607	Nürnberg-Rehhof	6
4608	Nürnberg-Reichelsdorf	4
4596	Nürnberg Rothenburger Straße	5
4609	Nürnberg-Sandreuth	6
4610	Nürnberg-Schweinau	6
4611	Nürnberg-Stein	5
2473	Nürnberg-Steinbühl	5
4619	Oberasbach	6
4620	Oberau	5
4658	Oberkotzau	5
4688	Oberschleissheim	4
4693	Oberstaufen	5
4694	Oberstdorf	3
4699	Obertraubling	5
4718	Ochenbruck	6
4720	Ochsenfurt	5
4763	Olching	4
4825	Ottenhofen (Oberbayern)	5
4826	Ottenhofen-Bergel	7
4828	Otterfing	5
4836	Ottobrunn	5
4868	Parsberg	4
4872	Passau Hbf	3
4883	Pegnitz	4
4896	Penzberg Pbf	6
4907	Petershausen (Oberbay)	4
4913	Pfaffenhofen (Ilm)	5
4933	Piding	5
4949	Planegg (Krailling)	4
4952	Plattling	3
4960	Pleinfeld	4
4981	Poing	5
5006	Possenhofen	5
5009	Postbauer-Heng	6
5035	Prien am Chiemsee	4
5054	Puchheim	4
5057	Pullach	6
5058	Pulling (b Freising)	5
5094	Radldorf (Niederbay)	5
5142	Raubling	4
5165	Rednitzhembach	6
5169	Regensburg Hbf	2
5170	Regensburg-Prüfening	4
5182	Reichelsdorfer Keller	6
5192	Reichertshausen (Ilm)	6
5235	Retzbach-Zellingen	5
6874	Rohrbach (Ilm)	5
5323	Röhrmoos	5
5348	Rosenheim	2
5362	Rosstal	5
5363	Rosstal-Wegbrücke	6
5385	Roth	3
5389	Röthenbach (Pegnitz)	6
5390	Röthenbach-Seespitze	6
5391	Röthenbach-Steinberg	6
5400	Rottendorf	4
5464	Sachsen (b Ansbach)	6
5519	Sauerlach	5
5662	Schöngeising	5
5696	Schwabach	3
5697	Schwabach-Limbach	5
5702	Schwabmünchen	5
5704	Schwaig	6
5710	Schwandorf	4
5742	Schweinfurt Hbf	3
4926	Schweinfurt Mitte	6
5743	Schweinfurt Stadt	5
5768	Schwindegg	5
5784	Seefeld-Hechendorf	5
5822	Senden	5
5841	Siegelsdorf	4
5907	Sonthofen	6
5944	St. Kolomann	6
5970	Starnberg	4
4750	Starnberg-Nord	4
5981	Steinach (b Rothenburg o. d. Tauber)	4
5991	Steinebach	6
6030	Stockdorf	4
6056	Straubing	4
6116	Sulzbach-Rosenberg	5
6157	Taufkirchen	5
6186	Thalfingen (b Ulm)	6
6240	Traunstein	4
6252	Treuchtlingen	3
6286	Türkenfeld	5
6287	Türkheim (Bay)	5
6294	Tutzing	4
6301	Übersee	5
6342	Unterasbach	6
6346	Unterföhring	4
6350	Unterhaching	5
6363	Unterschleißheim	5
6385	Vach	5
6395	Vaterstetten	5
6403	Veitshöchheim	6
1719	Vierkirchen-Esterhofen	5
6423	Vilshofen (Niederbay)	4
6439	Vöhringen	5
6459	Wächterhof	5
6597	Weiden (Oberpf)	4
6616	Weilheim (Oberbay)	4
6632	Weissenburg (Bay)	4
6705	Wessling (Oberbay)	5
6712	Westerham	6
6732	Wicklesgreuth	5
6799	Winkelhaid	6
6858	Wolfratshausen	6
6945	Würzburg Hbf	2
6946	Würzburg Süd	5
7030	Zirndorf	6
7045	Zorneding	5
7072	Zwiesel (Bay)	5

== See also ==
- German railway station categories
- Railway station types of Germany
- List of scheduled railway routes in Germany
