= Winkelhaid station =

Railway station in Germany

Winkelhaid
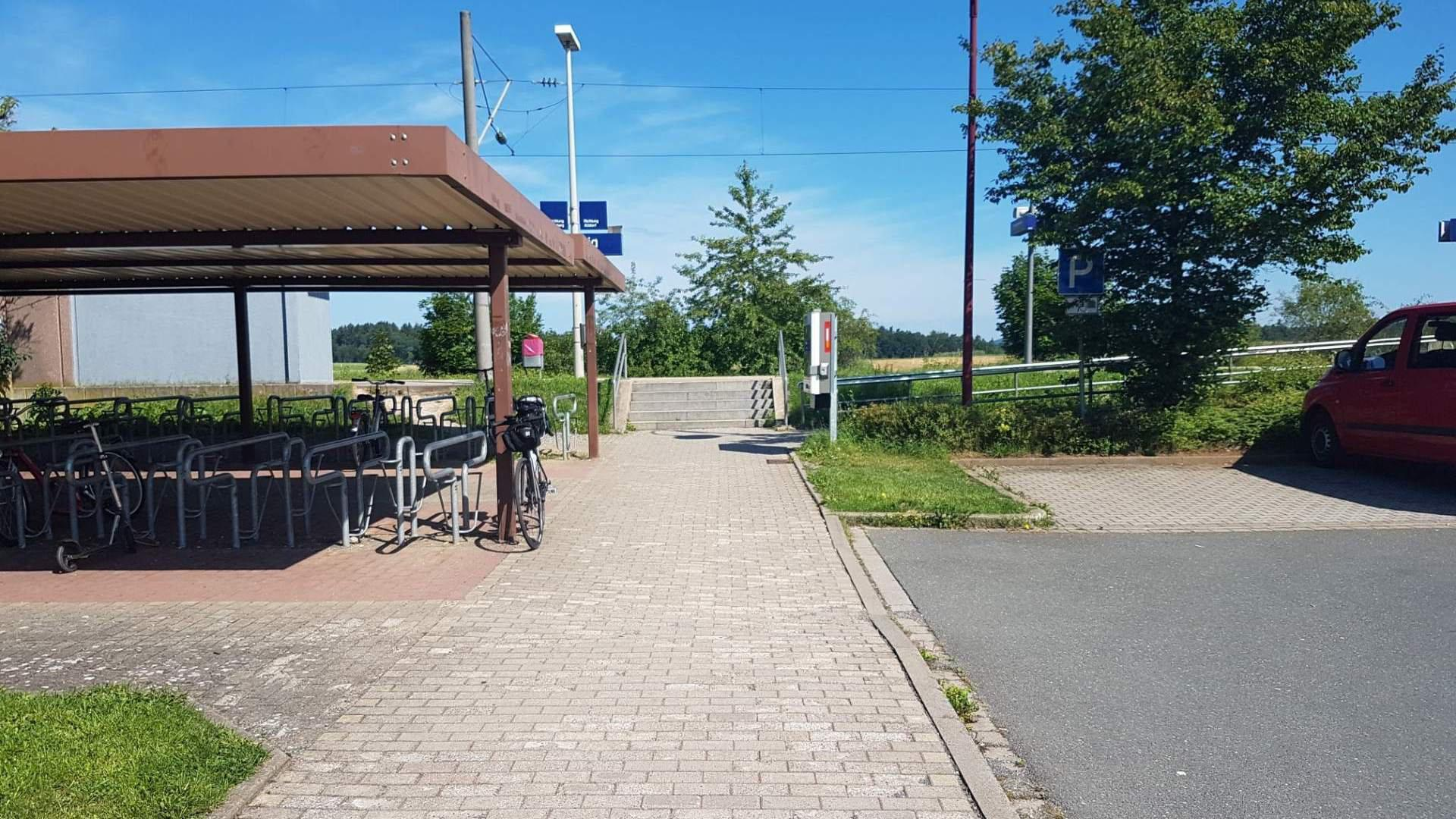
- The station in 2017

General information
- Location: Juraweg; Winkelhaid, Bavaria; Germany
- Coordinates: 49°23′34″N 11°18′04″E
- Elevation: 429 m (1,407 ft)
- Owner: DB Netz
- Operator: DB Station&Service
- Lines: Feucht–Altdorf line (KBS 890.2)
- Distance: 7.6 km (4.7 mi) from Feucht
- Platforms: 1 side platform
- Tracks: 1
- Train operators: DB Regio Bayern

Other information
- Station code: 6799
- DS100 code: NWKH
- IBNR: 8006476
- Category: 6
- Fare zone: VGN: 523 and 524
- Website: www.bahnhof.de

Services
Preceding station	Nuremberg S-Bahn	Following station
Feucht-Moosbach towards Roth	S2	Ludersheim towards Hartmannshof
Location

Winkelhaid station is a railway station in the municipality of Winkelhaid, located in the Nürnberger Land district in Middle Franconia, Germany. The station is on the Feucht–Altdorf line of Deutsche Bahn.
