= Pommelsbrunn station =

Railway station in Germany

Pommelsbrunn
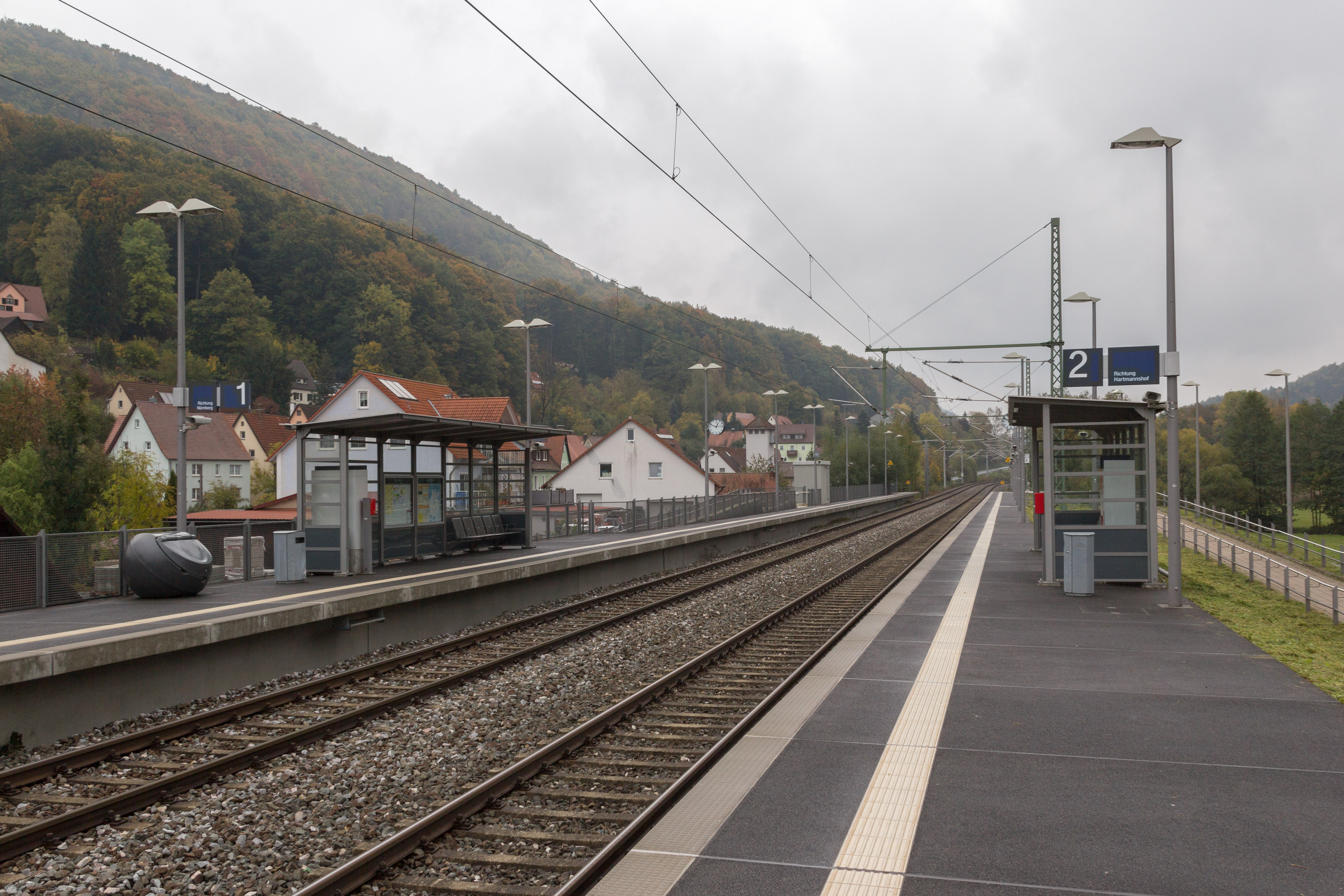
- The station in 2015

General information
- Location: Arzloher Straße; Pommelsbrunn, Bavaria; Germany
- Coordinates: 49°30′05″N 11°30′50″E
- Owner: DB Netz
- Operator: DB Station&Service
- Lines: Nuremberg–Schwandorf line (KBS 890.1)
- Distance: 32.5 km (20.2 mi) from Nürnberg Hauptbahnhof
- Platforms: 2 side platforms
- Tracks: 2
- Train operators: DB Regio Bayern

Other information
- Station code: 4986
- DS100 code: NPMH
- IBNR: 8004858
- Category: 6
- Fare zone: VGN: 541 and 542
- Website: www.bahnhof.de

History
- Opened: 4 December 2010

Services
Preceding station	Nuremberg S-Bahn	Following station
Happurg towards Roth	S2	Hartmannshof Terminus
Location

Pommelsbrunn station is a railway station in the municipality of Pommelsbrunn, located in the Nürnberger Land district in Middle Franconia, Germany. It is located on the Nuremberg–Schwandorf line of Deutsche Bahn. It is served by the S1 of the Nuremberg S-Bahn.
