= Feucht-Moosbach station =

Railway station in Germany

Feucht Moosbach
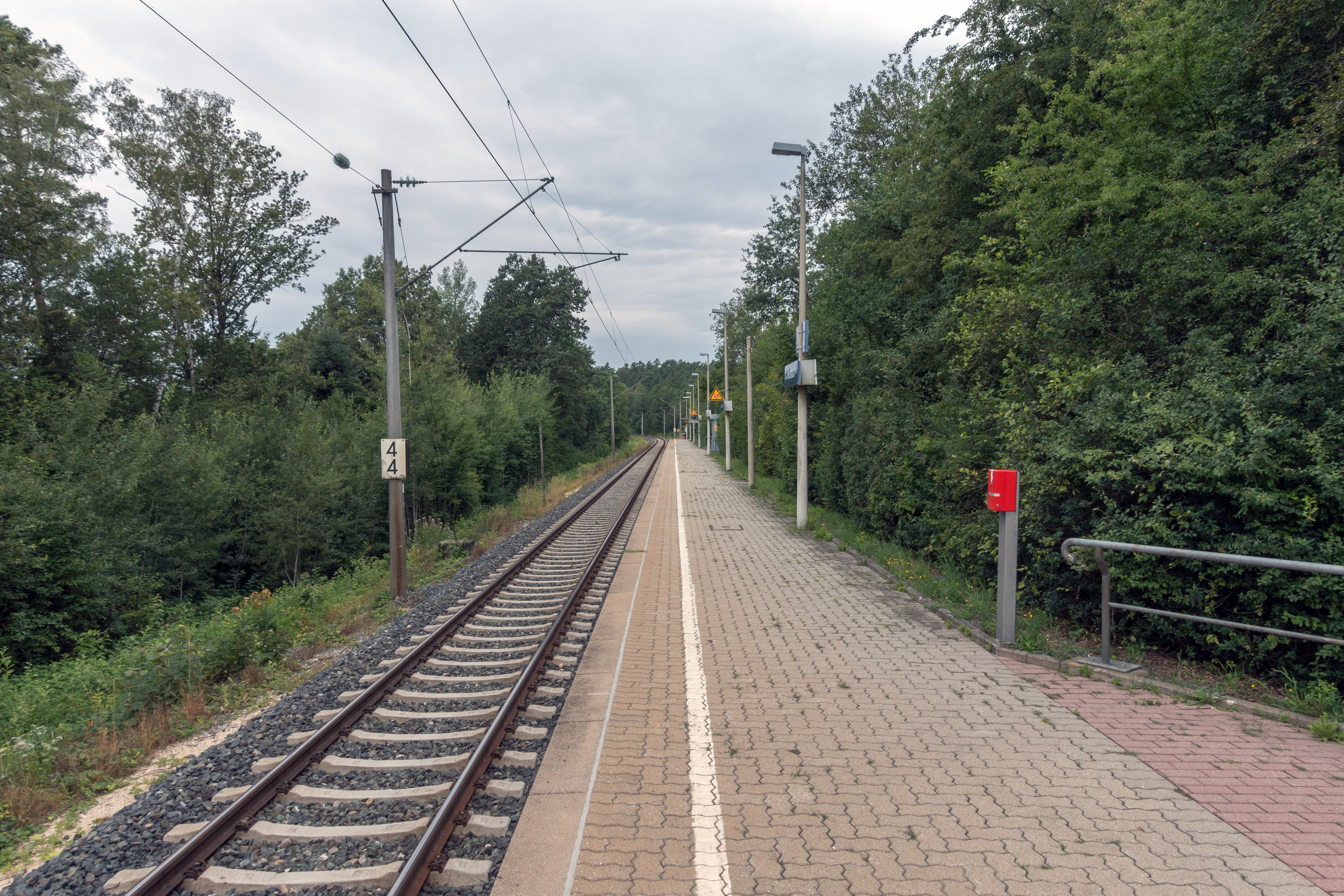
- The station in 2019

General information
- Location: Am Bahndamm 8 Feucht, Bavaria; Germany
- Coordinates: 49°23′16″N 11°15′39″E
- Owner: DB Netz
- Operator: DB Station&Service
- Lines: Feucht–Altdorf line (KBS 890.2)
- Distance: 4.3 km (2.7 mi) from Feucht
- Platforms: 1 side platform
- Tracks: 1
- Train operators: DB Regio Bayern

Other information
- Station code: 1784
- DS100 code: NFTM
- IBNR: 8002520
- Category: 6
- Fare zone: VGN: 514 and 523
- Website: www.bahnhof.de

History
- Opened: 27 November 1987

Services
Preceding station	Nuremberg S-Bahn	Following station
Feucht towards Roth	S2	Winkelhaid towards Hartmannshof
Location

Feucht-Moosbach station is a railway station in the Moosbach district of the municipality of Feucht, located in the Nürnberger Land district in Middle Franconia, Germany. The station is on the Feucht–Altdorf line of Deutsche Bahn.

== Haltepunkt Hahnhof ==
The Haltepunkt Hahnhof was in operation until 27 November 1987. It was abandoned in the course of the reconstruction of the line to an S-Bahn line and replaced by the Haltepunkt Feucht-Moosbach, which is located only a few hundred meters west of it, away, but therefore much cheaper for the development of the village. The Hahnhof facilities were dismantled after the closure.
