= Nürnberg-Steinbühl station =

Railway station in Germany

Nürnberg Steinbühl
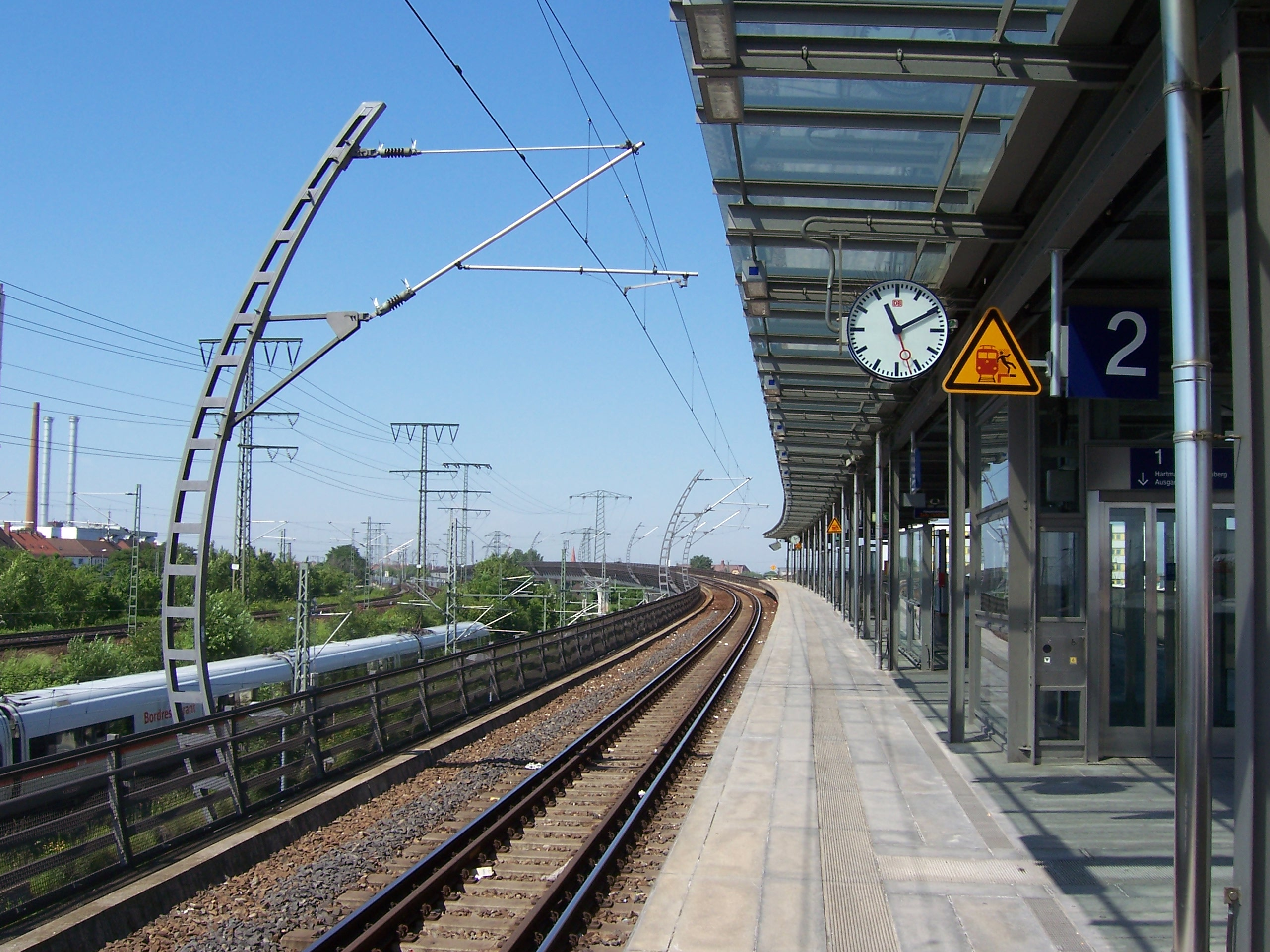
- The upper platform in 2013

General information
- Location: Steinbühler 1 Nuremberg, Bavaria; Germany
- Coordinates: 49°26′34″N 11°04′05″E
- Owner: DB Netz
- Operator: DB Station&Service
- Lines: Nuremberg–Bamberg line; Nuremberg–Roth line
- Distance: 1.1 km (0.68 mi) from Nürnburg Hbf
- Platforms: 2 side platforms
- Tracks: 2
- Train operators: DB Regio Bayern
- Connections: Trams:

Construction
- Structure type: Elevated

Other information
- Station code: 2473
- DS100 code: NNSN
- IBNR: 8004487
- Category: 5
- Fare zone: VGN: 100

History
- Opened: 5 September 2004

Services
Preceding station	Nuremberg S-Bahn	Following station
Rothenburgerstraße towards Bamberg	S1	Nürnberg Hbf towards Neumarkt (Oberpfalz)
Sandreuth towards Roth	S2	Nürnberg Hbf towards Hartmannshof
Location

Nürnberg-Steinbühl station is a railway station in Nuremberg, Bavaria, Germany. The station is on the Nuremberg–Bamberg and Nuremberg–Roth lines of Deutsche Bahn. It is served by Nuremberg S-Bahn lines S1 and S2. It is also served by Nuremberg tram routes 4 and 6.

== History ==
The station was opened on 5 September 2004.

== Location ==
The station is located in the west of Nuremberg.
