= Nürnberg-Ostring station =

Railway station in Nuremberg, Germany

Nürnberg Ostring
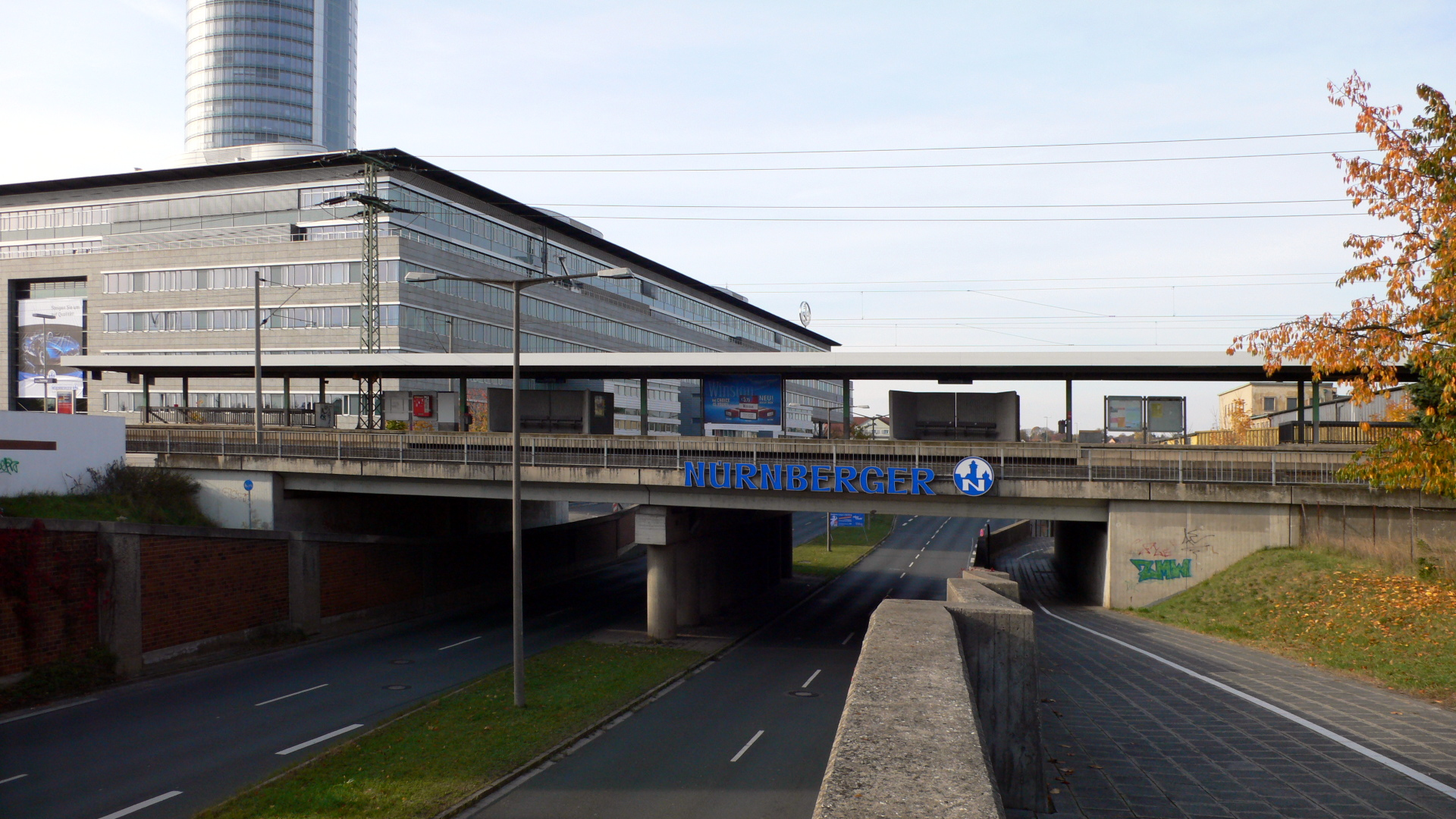
- The station above the B 4 R, with the Business Tower Nürnberg office complex behind

General information
- Location: Tullnau, Nuremberg, Bavaria; Germany
- Coordinates: 49°27′15″N 11°07′12″E
- Owner: DB Netz
- Operator: DB Station&Service
- Line: Nuremberg–Schwandorf line
- Distance: 3.0 km (1.9 mi) from Nürnberg Hauptbahnhof
- Platforms: 1 island
- Tracks: 2
- Train operators: DB Regio Bayern
- Connections: City bus lines 43, 65

Construction
- Structure type: Elevated

Other information
- Station code: 4606
- DS100 code: NNOS
- IBNR: 8004470
- Category: 6
- Fare zone: VGN: 100

History
- Opened: 26 September 1987

Services
Preceding station	Nuremberg S-Bahn	Following station
Dürrenhof towards Roth	S2	Mögeldorf towards Hartmannshof
Location

Nürnberg-Ostring station is a Nuremberg S-Bahn railway station on the Nuremberg–Schwandorf railway at the intersection with the B 4 ring road ("B 4 R", this section named Cheruskerstraße) in the Tullnau neighbourhood of Nuremberg, Bavaria, Germany. The station has a 120-metre (390 ft) long and 85-centimetre (33 in) high island platform elevated above the roadway, accessed by stairs on either side. It is served by the S1 line and has stops for city bus lines 43 and 65 on the north of the station on either side of the B 4 R; there is also a stop for tram line 5 at the intersection of the B 4 R and Ostendstraße 200 metres (660 ft) north of the station.

Nürnberg–Ostring opened on 26 September 1987 with the start of the first Nuremberg S-Bahn service by the Deutsche Bundesbahn.

The Business Tower Nürnberg office complex, the headquarters of the Nürnberger Versicherung insurance company, is adjacent to the station. The Business Tower also gives the name to the Straßenbahn Nürnberg stop some 150 m (490 ft) away.
