= Happurg station =

Railway station in Germany

Happurg

General information
- Location: Hohenstädter Straße 100; Happurg, Bavaria; Germany
- Coordinates: 49°30′00″N 11°28′06″E
- Owner: DB Netz
- Operator: DB Station&Service
- Lines: Nuremberg–Schwandorf line (KBS 890.1)
- Distance: 30.5 km (19.0 mi) from Nürnberg Hauptbahnhof
- Platforms: 2 side platforms
- Tracks: 2
- Train operators: DB Regio Bayern

Other information
- Station code: 8194
- DS100 code: NHAP
- IBNR: 8002578
- Category: 6
- Fare zone: VGN: 541 and 542
- Website: www.bahnhof.de

History
- Opened: 10 December 2010

Services
Preceding station	Nuremberg S-Bahn	Following station
Hersbruck (links Pegnitz) towards Roth	S2	Pommelsbrunn towards Hartmannshof
Location

Happurg station is a railway station in the municipality of Happurg, located in the Nürnberger Land district in Middle Franconia, Germany. It is located on the Nuremberg–Schwandorf line of Deutsche Bahn. The S1 of the Nuremberg S-Bahn serves it.
