= Eckersmühlen station =

Railway station in Germany

Eckersmühlen

General information
- Location: Eckersmühlener Hauptstraße 18; 91154 Roth; Bavaria; Germany
- Coordinates: 49.2155°N 11.1381°E
- Owner: DB Netz
- Operator: DB Station&Service
- Lines: Roth–Greding railway (KBS 911)
- Platforms: 1 side platform
- Tracks: 1
- Train operators: DB Regio

Other information
- Station code: 1458
- DS100 code: NEMN
- IBNR: 8001655
- Category: 7
- Fare zone: VGN: 643 and 644
- Website: www.bahnhof.de

Services
| Preceding station | DB Regio Bayern | Following station |
|---|---|---|
| Lohgarten-Roth towards Roth | RB 61 | Hilpoltstein Terminus |
Location
- Location within Bavaria

Eckersmühlen station is a railway station in the Eckersmühlen district of the municipality of Roth, located in the Roth district in Middle Franconia, Germany.
