= Lohgarten-Roth station =

Railway station in Roth, Germany

Lohgarten-Roth

General information
- Location: Lohgartenweg 2; 91154 Roth; Germany
- Coordinates: 49.2436°N 11.0960°E
- Owner: DB Netz
- Operator: DB Station&Service
- Lines: Roth–Greding railway (KBS 911)
- Platforms: 1 side platform
- Tracks: 1
- Train operators: DB Regio Bayern

Other information
- Station code: 3763
- DS100 code: NLOR
- IBNR: 8003734
- Category: 7
- Fare zone: VGN: 631 and 632
- Website: www.bahnhof.de

Services
Preceding station	DB Regio Bayern	Following station
Roth Terminus	RB 61	Eckersmühlen towards Hilpoltstein
Location
- Location within Bavaria

Lohgarten-Roth station is a railway station in the Lohgarten district of the municipality of Roth, located in the Roth district in Middle Franconia, Germany.
