= Nürnberg-Rehhof station =

Railway station in Nuremberg, Germany

Nürnberg Rehhof
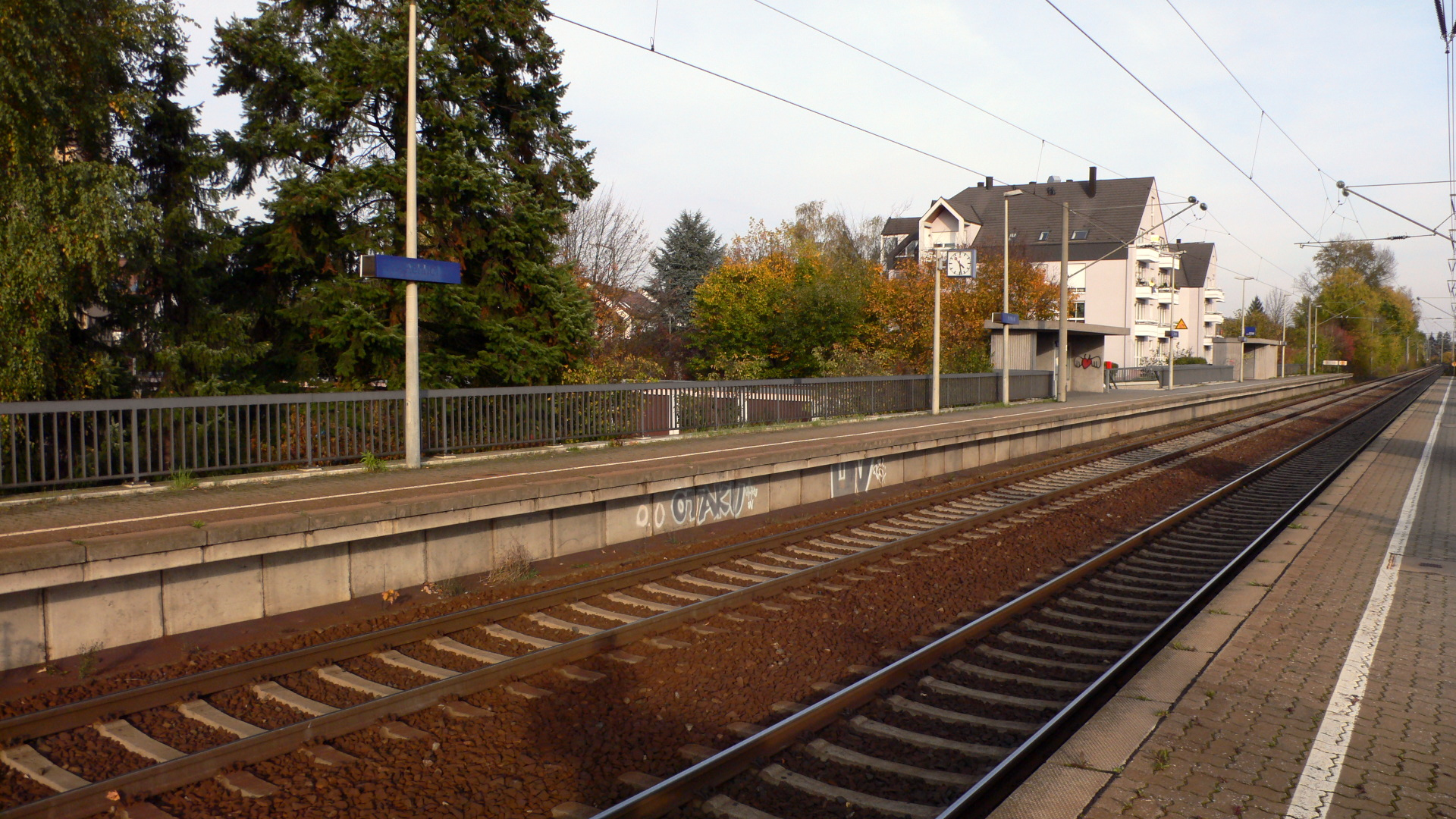
- The station in 2008

General information
- Location: Rehhofstraße 1 Nuremberg, Bavaria; Germany
- Coordinates: 49°27′47″N 11°09′18″E
- Owner: DB Netz
- Operator: DB Station&Service
- Lines: Nuremberg–Schwandorf line (KBS 890.1)
- Distance: 5.7 km (3.5 mi) from Nürnberg Hauptbahnhof
- Platforms: 2 side platforms
- Tracks: 2
- Train operators: DB Regio Bayern

Other information
- Station code: 4607
- DS100 code: NNRH
- IBNR: 8004491
- Category: 6
- Fare zone: VGN: 200
- Website: www.bahnhof.de

History
- Opened: 26 September 1987; 38 years ago

Services
Preceding station	Nuremberg S-Bahn	Following station
Mögeldorf towards Roth	S2	Laufamholz towards Hartmannshof
Location

Nürnberg-Rehhof station (German: Bahnhof Nürnberg-Rehhof)) is a railway station in the city of Nuremberg, in Bavaria, Germany. It is located on the Nuremberg–Schwandorf line of Deutsche Bahn. It is served by the S1 of the Nuremberg S-Bahn.
