= Nürnberg-Mögeldorf station =

Railway station in Nuremberg, Germany

Nürnberg Mögeldorf
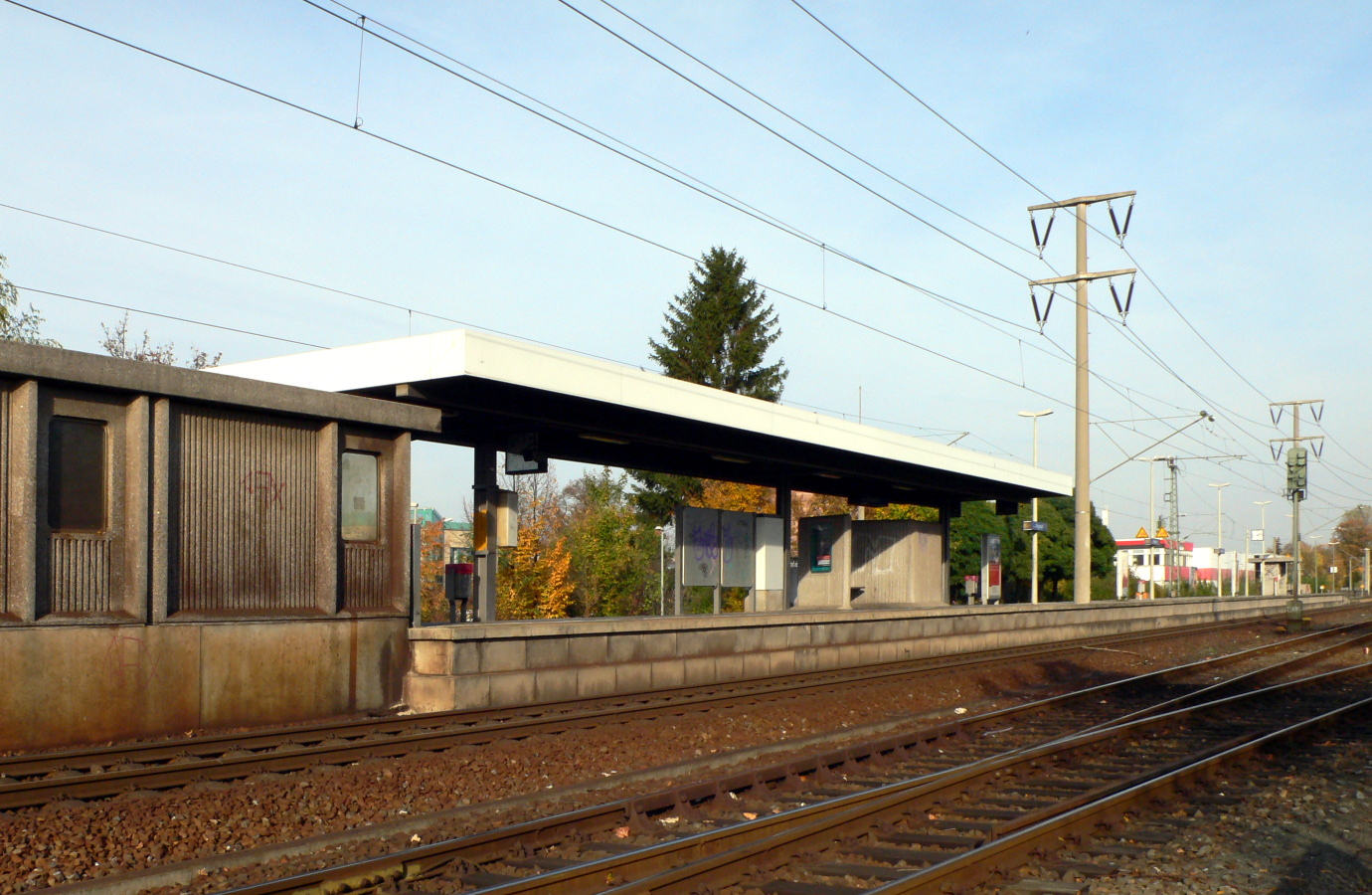
- The station in 2008

General information
- Location: Freiligrathstraße; Nuremberg, Bavaria; Germany
- Coordinates: 49°27′33″N 11°08′02″E
- Elevation: 317 m (1,040 ft)
- Owner: DB Netz
- Operator: DB Station&Service
- Lines: Nuremberg–Schwandorf line (KBS 890.1)
- Distance: 4.1 km (2.5 mi) from Nürnberg Hauptbahnhof
- Platforms: 1 island platform
- Tracks: 2
- Train operators: DB Regio Bayern

Other information
- Station code: 4604
- DS100 code: NNMO
- Fare zone: VGN: 100 and 200
- Website: www.bahnhof.de

History
- Opened: 9 May 1859; 167 years ago

Services
Preceding station	Nuremberg S-Bahn	Following station
Ostring towards Roth	S2	Rehhof towards Hartmannshof
Location

Nürnberg-Mögeldorf station (German: Bahnhof Nürnberg-Mögeldorf)) is a railway station in the city of Nuremberg, in Bavaria, Germany. It is located on the Nuremberg–Schwandorf line of Deutsche Bahn. It is served by the S1 of the Nuremberg S-Bahn as well as Nuremberg tramway line 5.

A Nuremberg tramway stop (line 5) and a bus stop is situated in north to the station.
