= Nürnberg-Laufamholz station =

Railway station in Nuremberg, Germany

Nürnberg Laufamholz
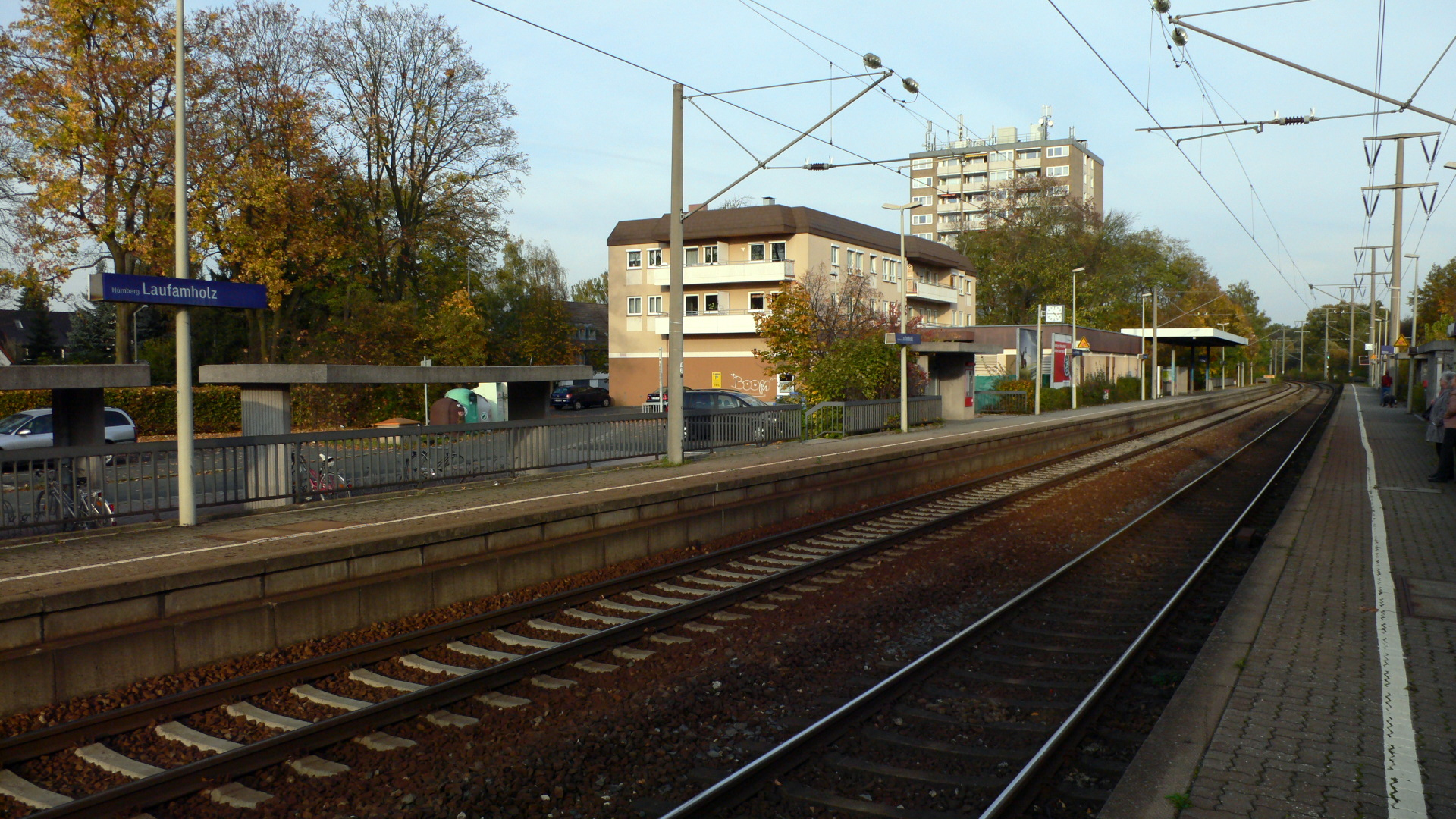
- The station in 2008

General information
- Location: Happurger Straße; Nuremberg, Bavaria; Germany
- Coordinates: 49°27′46″N 11°10′07″E
- Owner: DB Netz
- Operator: DB Station&Service
- Lines: Nuremberg–Schwandorf line (KBS 890.1)
- Distance: 6.7 km (4.2 mi) from Nürnberg Hauptbahnhof
- Platforms: 2 side platforms
- Tracks: 2
- Train operators: DB Regio Bayern

Other information
- Station code: 4603
- DS100 code: NNLH
- IBNR: 8004480
- Category: 5
- Fare zone: VGN: 200 and 501
- Website: www.bahnhof.de

History
- Opened: 8 August 1878; 148 years ago

Services
Preceding station	Nuremberg S-Bahn	Following station
Rehhof towards Roth	S2	Schwaig towards Hartmannshof
Location

Nürnberg-Laufamholz station is a railway station in the Laufamholz district of Nürnberg, Bavaria, Germany. It is located on the Nuremberg–Schwandorf line of Deutsche Bahn. It is served by the S1 of the Nuremberg S-Bahn.
