= Georgensgmünd station =

Railway station in Germany

Georgensgmünd
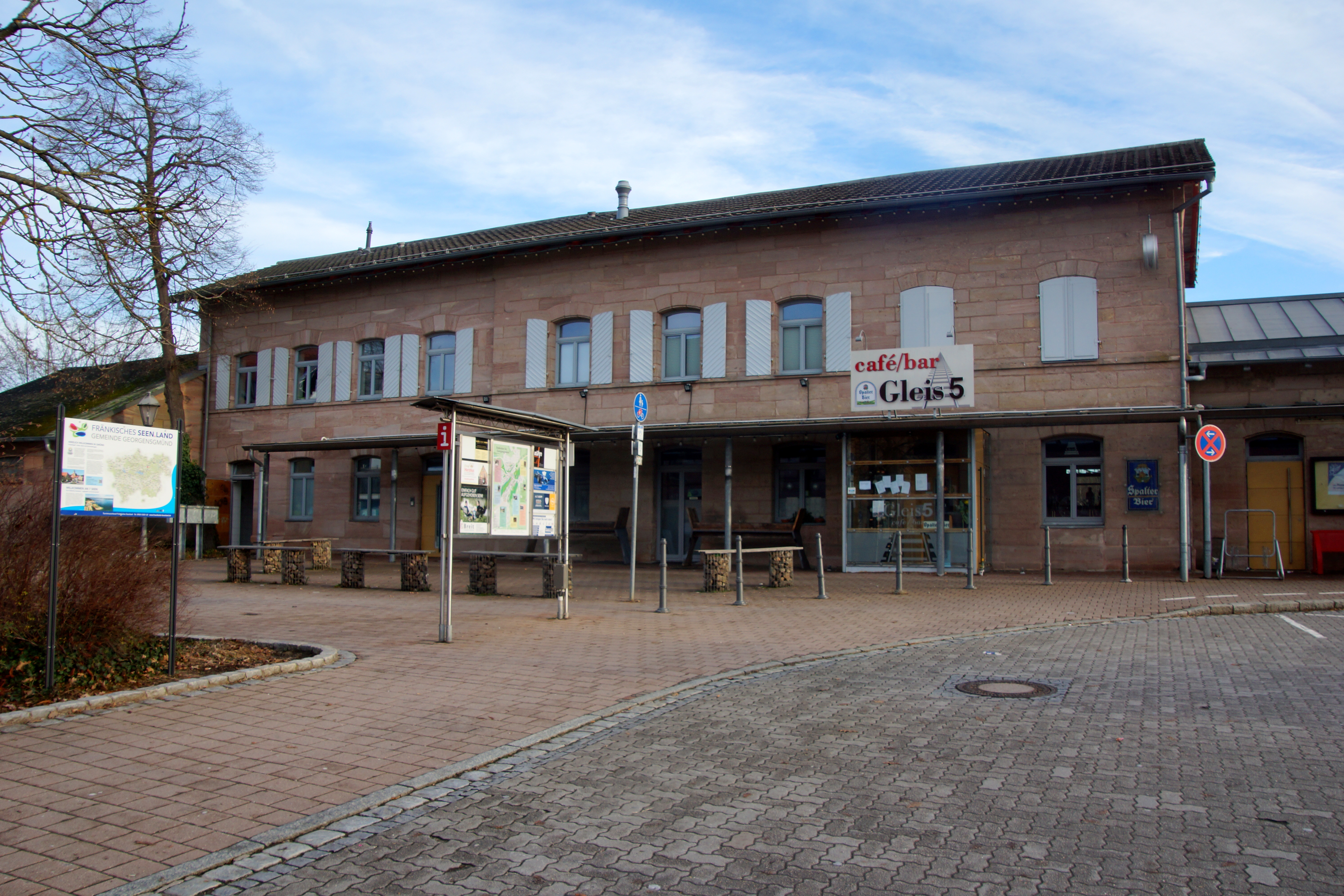

General information
- Location: Bahnhofstraße 31; 91166 Georgensgmünd; Bavaria; Germany
- Coordinates: 49.1831°N 11.0159°E
- System: Bf
- Owner: Deutsche Bahn
- Operator: DB Station&Service
- Lines: Nuremberg–Augsburg railway Georgensgmünd–Spalt railway
- Platforms: 1 island platform 1 side platform
- Tracks: 3
- Train operators: DB Regio Bayern

Other information
- Station code: 2071
- DS100 code: NGE
- IBNR: 8002237
- Category: 4
- Fare zone: VGN: 642
- Website: www.bahnhof.de

Services
Preceding station	DB Regio Bayern	Following station
Mühlstetten towards Augsburg Hbf	RE 16	Unterheckenhofen towards Nürnberg Hbf
Mühlstetten towards Treuchtlingen	RE 60	Roth towards Nürnberg Hbf
Mühlstetten towards München Hbf	RB 16	Unterheckenhofen towards Nürnberg Hbf
Location
- Location within Bavaria Location within Germany Location within Europe

Georgensgmünd station is a railway station in the municipality of Georgensgmünd, located in the Roth district in Middle Franconia, Bavaria, Germany.
