= Furth (Oberhaching) =

- Village of Oberhaching
- Interactive map of Furth
- Location within Germany Location within Bavaria
- Coordinates: 48°01′46″N 11°35′58″E
- Country: Germany
- State: Bavaria
- Admin. region: Oberbayern
- District: Munich
- Municipality: Oberhaching
- Time zone: UTC+01:00 (CET)
  - Summer (DST): UTC+02:00 (CEST)

Furth is a part of Oberhaching, located in the Munich district of Bavaria, Germany. It lies at the junction of the Pegnitz and Rednitz rivers, where they form the Regnitz, and is first mentioned in written sources in 1172.

The district of Furth borders in the north on the Perlacher Forst, in the south on the district of Deisenhofen (Oberhaching), in the west on the district of Grünwald and in the east on the district of Taufkirchen.

Furth is well known for its excursion restaurant and beer garden Kugler Alm. Cyclists cross the Furth area comfortably, as an asphalted, car-free route leads from Säbener Platz in Munich through the Perlacher Forest to Furth. There you can take a break in the beer garden of the Kugler Alm, or extend the bike tour further into the Bavarian Oberland.

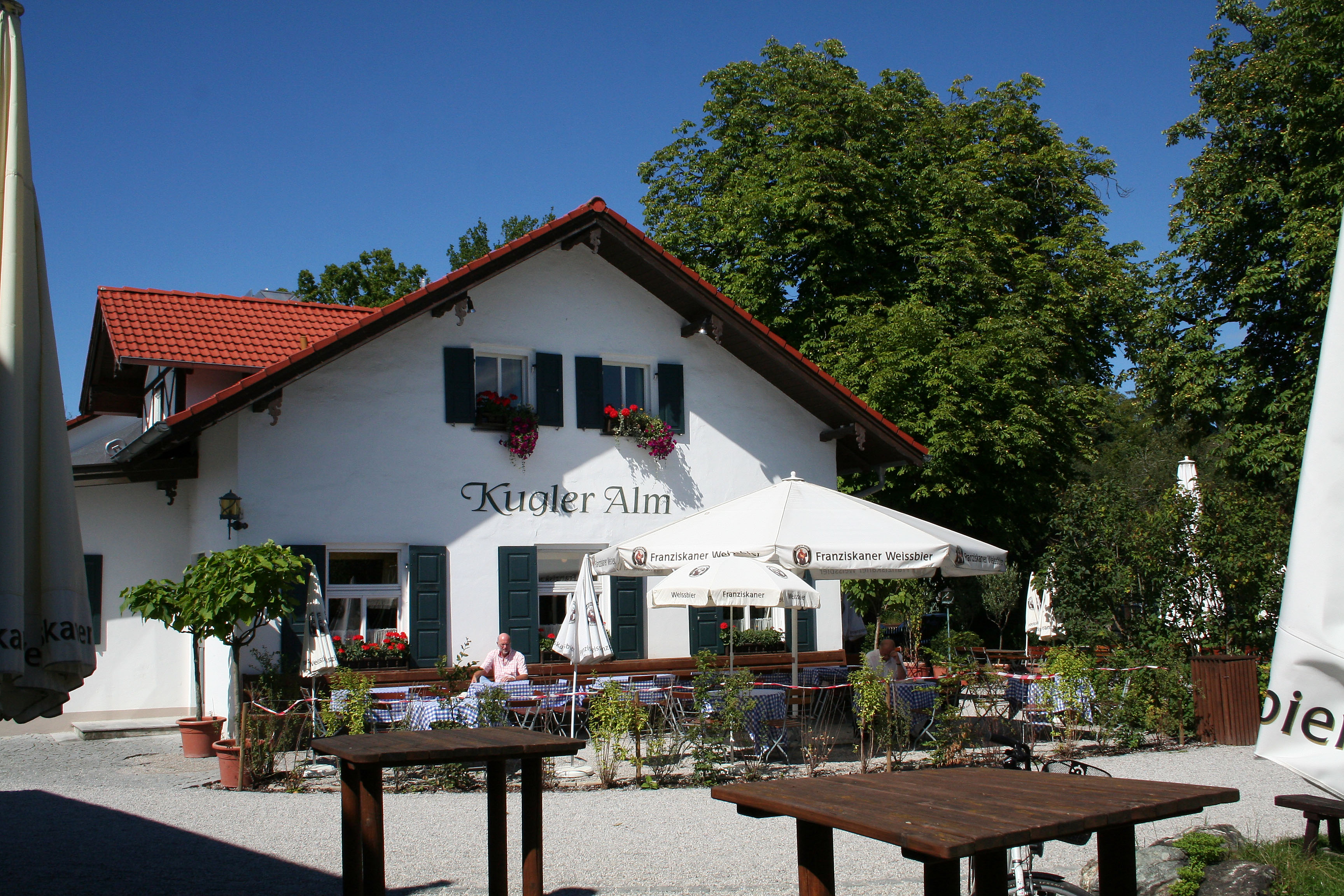
Kugler Alm

Furth is connected to the A 995 motorway (motorway exit 4 (Oberhaching)) and the Oberhaching-Grünwald bypass (M11). There is also an S-Bahn stop in Furth (S3) on the Munich East–Deisenhofen railway.

Furthermore, the Sportschule Oberhaching as well as the Naturbad Furth are well known in the region.

Furth is also home to the industrial park of the municipality of Oberhaching.
