= Heimstetten station =

Munich S-Bahn station

Heimstetten
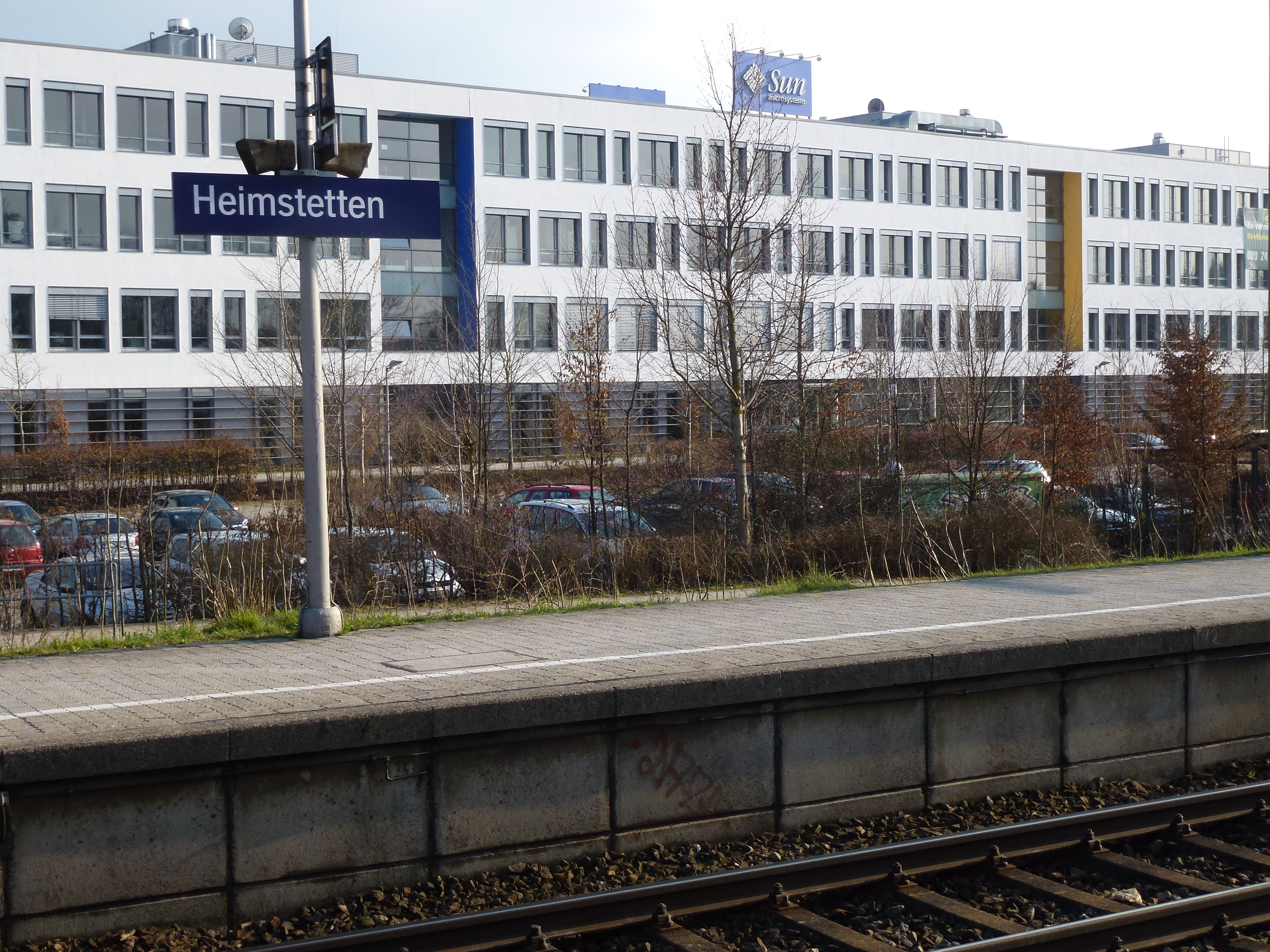
- 2011

General information
- Location: Bahnhofstraße; Poinger Straße; 85551 Kirchheim; Bavaria; Germany
- Coordinates: 48.1590°N 11.7604°E
- System: Hp
- Owner: Deutsche Bahn
- Operator: DB Netz; DB Station&Service
- Lines: Munich–Mühldorf railway (KBS 940)
- Platforms: 2 side platforms
- Tracks: 2
- Train operators: S-Bahn München
- Connections: 262, 263, X203

Construction
- Parking: yes
- Cycle facilities: yes
- Accessible: yes

Other information
- Station code: 2663
- DS100 code: MHEM
- IBNR: 8002715
- Category: 5
- Fare zone: : 1
- Website: www.bahnhof.de

History
- Opened: 1 May 1897; 129 years ago

Services
Preceding station	Munich S-Bahn	Following station
Feldkirchen (b München) towards Petershausen or Altomünster	S2	Grub (Oberbay) towards Erding
Location
- Location within Bavaria Location within Germany Location within Europe

Heimstetten station (German: Haltepunkt Heimstetten) is a railway station in Heimstetten in the municipality of Kirchheim bei München, located in the Munich district in Bavaria, Germany.
