= Nuremberg–Roth railway =

Nuremberg Hbf – Roth

Overview
- Line number: 5971
- Locale: Bavaria, Germany

Service
- Route number: 890.2

Technical
- Line length: 25.5 km (15.8 mi)
- Number of tracks: 2: Nürnberg-Eibach (crossover)–Nürnberg-Reichelsdorf (crossover); 2: Schwabach-Limbach (crossover)–Rednitzhembach (crossover); 2: Büchenbach (crossover)–Roth
- Track gauge: 1,435 mm (4 ft 8 1/2 in) standard gauge
- Electrification: 15 kV/16.7 Hz AC overhead catenary
- Operating speed: 120 km/h (75 mph)

The Nuremberg–Roth railway is a 25.5-kilometre (15.8 mi) long main line railway in the German state of Bavaria, running from Nuremberg via Schwabach to Roth. It was built parallel with the Nuremberg–Augsburg railway during the first construction phase of the Nuremberg S-Bahn and opened on 9 June 2001.

== History ==
The first demands for an S-Bahn network in greater Nuremberg were made in 1966. Deutsche Bundesbahn made a step in this direction in 1969 with the increase in services on the main lines during peak hour. The line between Nuremberg and Rothenburg was included in this, but did not receive regular interval services because of the dense traffic on the line. This service had to be withdrawn in the following years for operational reasons and also because of poor patronage, but Deutsche Bundesbahn still sought an improvement in services. In 1971, the then Bundesbahndirektion (railway division, BD) of Nuremberg was granted permission to develop solutions to improve services. The results were presented on 20 March 1975 as a "framework plan for the Nuremberg S-Bahn", which included an S-Bahn line from Nuremberg to Roth. This was included as part of the "first stage” of construction of the Nuremberg S-Bahn adopted on 29 June 1979, as well as in the financial agreement closed on 2 November 1981, which allowed detailed planning to begin.

=== Preliminary planning ===
The realisation of the planned "mainline replacement line" between Roth and Fischbach through the Nuremberg Reichswald (imperial forest) would have relieved the Nuremberg–Roth line and thus made room for S-Bahn services on the existing double track line. After the adjacent municipalities and citizens groups expressed opposition to the Reichswald route, the Nuremberg BD examined the plans between 1980 and 1985 on behalf of Deutsche Bundesbahn. At the same time, the BD proposed the construction of a new line from Nuremberg to Ingolstadt as an alternative option, which was politically popular, except in Augsburg and the adjacent municipalities of Swabia. As a result, a further report was commissioned on this proposal, which delayed the S-Bahn plans again. Planning could only resume for S-Bahn line S 3 in June 1991, after the completion of this report, which supported a new line. This also supported a separate, double-track line, running parallel to the Nuremberg–Augsburg line, which would be modified to run as a single-track line.

=== Construction ===
The groundbreaking ceremony for the construction of the line took place on 29 June 1994 at Nürnberg-Reichelsdorf station. About 700 million Deutsche Marks (about €358 million) was spent for the construction, including the duplication of the existing rail infrastructure, the construction of many engineering structures, the upgrading and construction of stations and the construction of the new line.

==== Infrastructure ====
The stations of Nürnberg-Sandreuth, Reichelsdorfer Keller, Katzwang, Schwabach-Limbach, Rednitzhembach and Büchenbach were closed and replaced by new stations on the S-Bahn line. Separate S-Bahn platforms were built and the old platforms were closed for passengers at the stations of Nürnberg-Eibach, Nürnberg-Reichelsdorf and Schwabach. Roth station received a new island platform, located just north of the station building, as a terminus for the S-Bahn trains. After a delay of three years, Nürnberg-Steinbühl station, located between Nürnberg Hauptbahnhof and Nürnberg-Sandreuth at the eastern end of the flying junction, opened to traffic on 5 September 2004. All platforms are 145 metres (475 ft) long, 96 centimetres (38 in) high and provided with barrier-free access. Provision was made for building Nürnberg Wienerstraße station between Nürnberg-Eibach and Nuremberg-Reichelsdorf. Bicycle storage (B+R) was provided at all stations except Schwabach-Limbach. Commuter car parking (P+R) was provided at all stations except Nürnberg-Steinbühl and Nürnberg–Sandreuth.

The entire route is controlled from a newly established electronic control centre at Nürnberg-Eibach, which was put into operation on 8 May 2001.

==== Line ====
Following a planning revision, an S-Bahn line was created that alternates between single and double track, running between Nürnberg Hauptbahnhof and Nuremberg-Eibach to the west and between Nuremberg-Reichelsdorf and the terminus at Roth to the east of the main line. This line runs to the east of the existing railway line between Nuremberg and Augsburg. In order for S-Bahn trains to operate without crossing the path of other services on the existing tracks 1–3 at Roth station, two terminating platforms were created for S-Bahn trains to the north of platform 1. Subsequently, a 604-metre-long (661 yd) single-track overpass was built over the lines to Bamberg/Würzburg and to Crailsheim. Other bridges built included a 125-metre-long (137 yd) steel truss bridge crossing the Southwest Tangent (a southwestern bypass of Nuremberg and Fürth) and the Main-Danube Canal, a flyover between Nuremberg-Eibach and Nuremberg-Reichelsdorf in order to change from the west to the east side of the Nuremberg–Augsburg line, and three bridges over the Rednitz, Schwabach and Aurach valleys. The line was provided with noise barriers to protect residents for almost its entire length.

The Steinbühl Bridge was, at its opening, the longest bridge in Nuremberg.

== Route ==
The single-track train route leaves Nürnberg Hauptbahnhof to the west, running first past the outer grounds of the Nuremberg Transport Museum. From the bridge over Steinbühler Tunnel (a street under Nürnberg-Steinbühl station) the line goes onto the overpass above the lines to Bamberg and to Crailsheim, as well as an elongated left turn over the Frankenschnellweg autobahn. At the beginning of the structure is Nürnberg-Steinbühl station, which provides interchange with the urban tram network. The line then runs within the districts of Schweinau to the west and Sandreuth to the east and crosses the south ring (federal highway B 4 R) over a bridge, on which Nürnberg-Sandreuth station is located. The line runs under the line that formerly connected the Nuremberg marshalling yard and the former Nuremberg main goods yard and the Ring Railway and then crosses over the parallel Southwest Tangent road and the Main-Danube Canal.

From kilometre point 4.6 the line is double-track and after Nuremberg-Eibach station it runs through the eastern part of the district of Nuremberg-Eibach. Then, the line meets the Frankenschnellweg, now running parallel, and crosses the Nuremberg-Augsburg railway on a flyover near Königshofer Weg to continue on its eastern side. The line runs through the district of Reichelsdorf, including Nuremberg-Reichelsdorf station, which is located at the overpass over Weltenburger Straße. Subsequently, the line is single-track again and cuts through the growing suburbs to the southeast of Reichelsdorf and after Reichelsdorfer Keller station leaves the Nuremberg city area for the first time. The line now runs parallel with the Rednitz valley, which it crosses shortly afterwards on a 170-metre-long (190 yd) bridge in the Schwabach suburb of Wolkersdorf and re-enters the Nuremberg city area again briefly at Katzwang station.

The line continues through the Schwabach suburb of Limbach, crosses the Schwabach river and reached Schwabach station, located to the east of central Schwabach. The line then crosses federal highway B2 at a tangent in the district of Forsthof and runs under the A 6 autobahn through the district of Vogelherd and out of Schwabach. In the Rednitzhembach district of Igelsdorf the line reaches Rednitzhembach station, which is in the district of Plöckendorf, and, after passing through Untermaimbach it again runs along the Rednitz, which it follows from now on. The line reaches Büchenbach station on the eastern edge of Büchenbach municipality and crosses the Aurach, already in the Roth city area. The line runs to the west of central Roth and ends at Roth station. The western tracks connect to the Roth–Greding railway to Hilpoltstein.

=== Line standards ===
The line is doubled between kilometre 4.6 and 8.8, km 13.1 and 16.9, and km 22.1 and 25.5. It is single-track elsewhere. Furthermore, it is electrified throughout and can be operated at a maximum line speed of 120 kilometres per hour (75 mph). All stations along the route have platforms that are 145 metres (475 ft) long and 96 centimetres (38 in) high above the top of the rail.

== Operations ==
Services on the line are operated by push-pull trains, composed of class 143 electric locomotives with four x-Wagen (carriages), as S-Bahn line S 2 (Roth–Nuremberg–Altdorf).
