= Schwabach (Rednitz) =

River in Germany

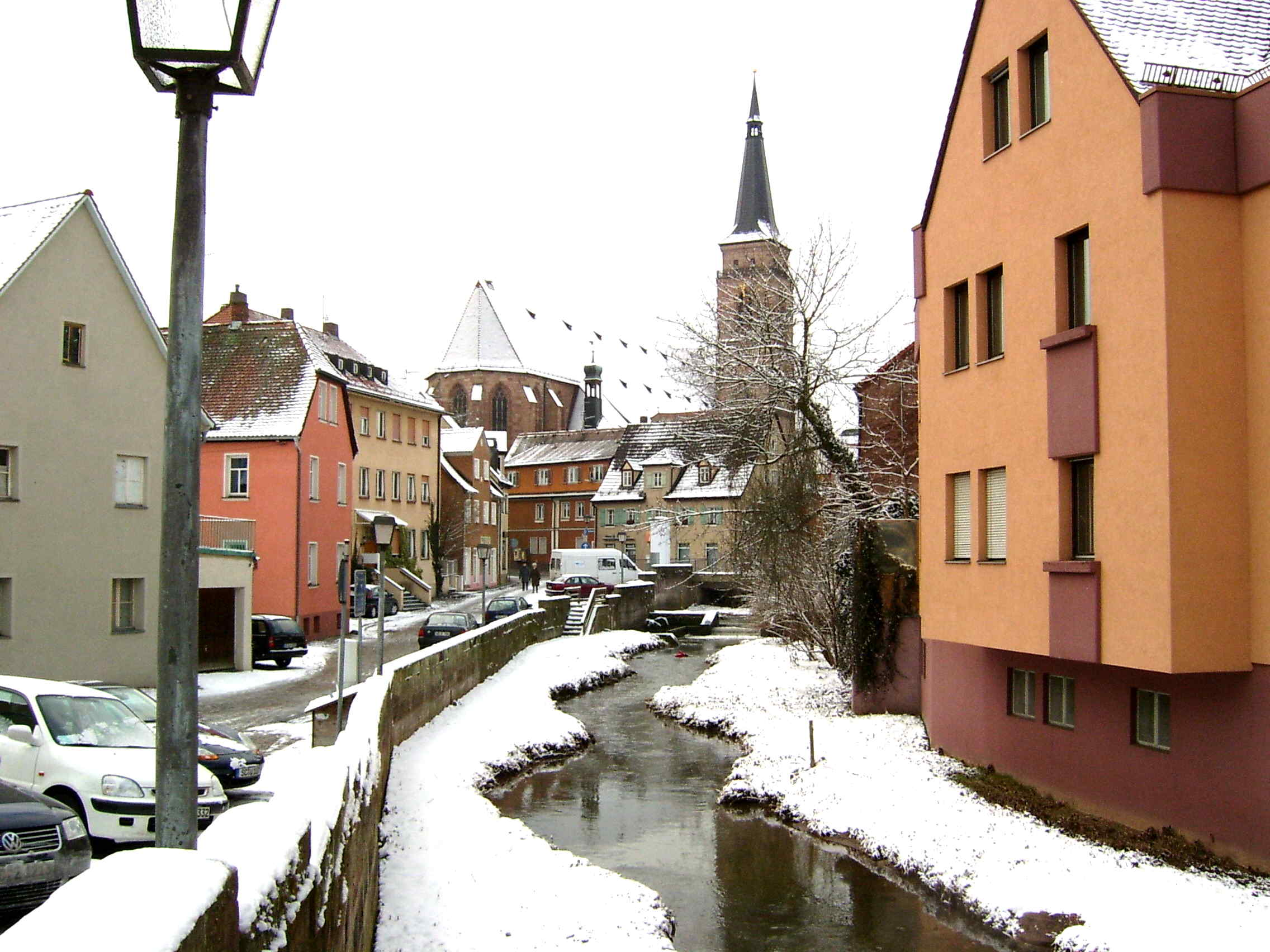
- The Schwabach at Ausfluss in Schwabach

Location
- Country: Germany
- State: Bavaria

Physical characteristics
- Mouth
  - location: Rednitz
  - coordinates: 49.3413°N 11.0554°E
- Length: 23.0 km (14.3 mi)

Basin features
- Progression: Rednitz→ Regnitz→ Main→ Rhine→ North Sea

Schwabach is a river of Bavaria, Germany. It is a left tributary of the Rednitz near the town Schwabach.

== See also ==
- List of rivers of Bavaria
