= Hilpoltstein station =

Railway station in Roth, Germany

Hilpoltstein
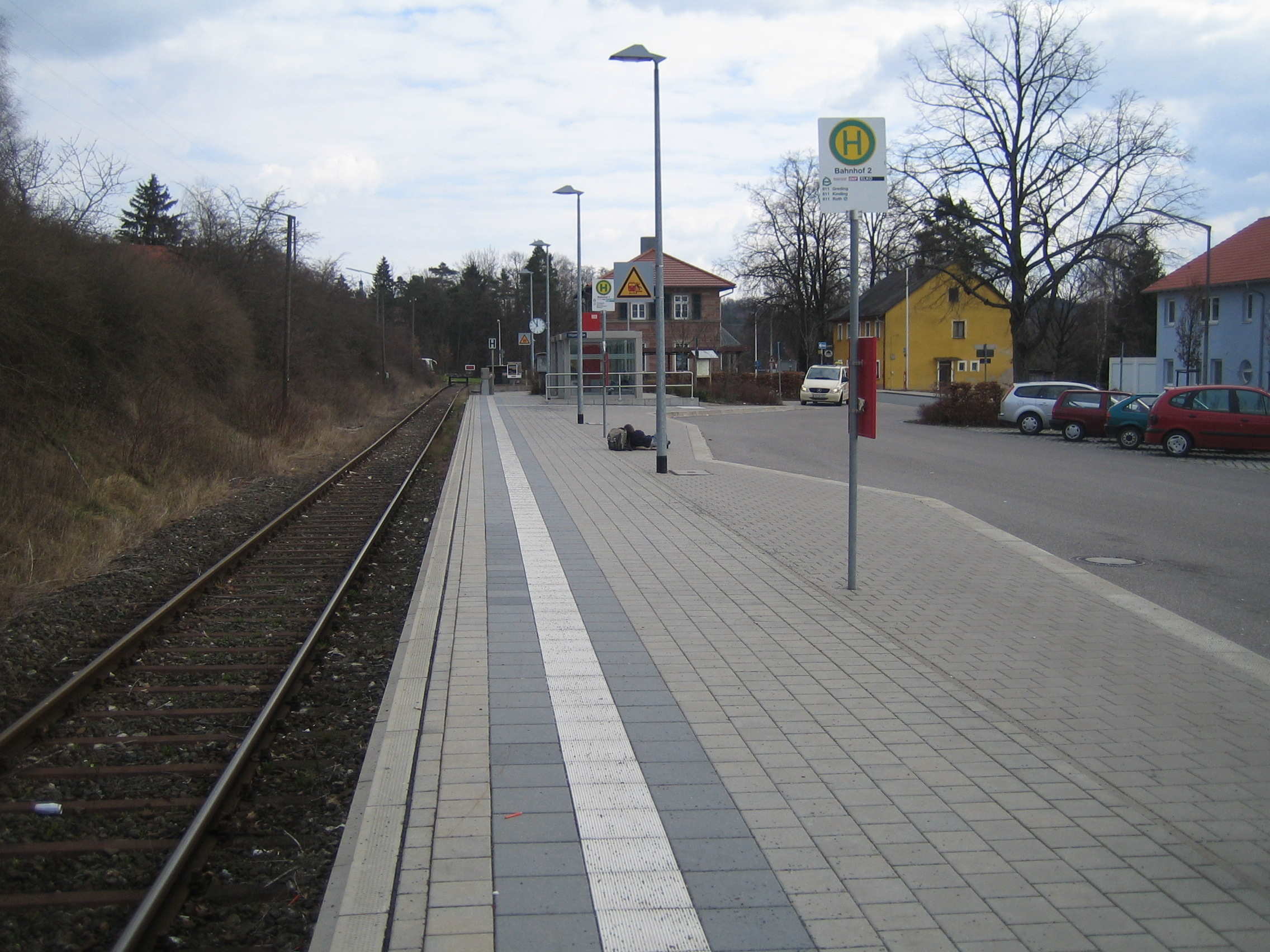
- 2007

General information
- Location: Bahnhofstraße 1; 91161 Hilpoltstein; Bavaria; Germany
- Coordinates: 49.1887°N 11.1842°E
- Elevation: 382 m (1,253 ft)
- Owner: DB Netz
- Operator: DB Station&Service
- Lines: Roth–Greding railway (KBS 911)
- Platforms: 1 side platform
- Tracks: 1
- Train operators: DB Regio

Other information
- Station code: 2769
- DS100 code: NHP
- IBNR: 8002838
- Category: 7
- Fare zone: VGN: 653 and 654
- Website: www.bahnhof.de

Services
| Preceding station | DB Regio Bayern | Following station |
|---|---|---|
| Eckersmühlen towards Roth | RB 61 | Terminus |
Location
- Location within Bavaria

Hilpoltstein station is a railway station in the municipality of Hilpoltstein, located in the Roth district in Middle Franconia, Germany.
