= Feldkirchen (b München) station =

Railway station in Bavaria, Germany

Feldkirchen (b München)
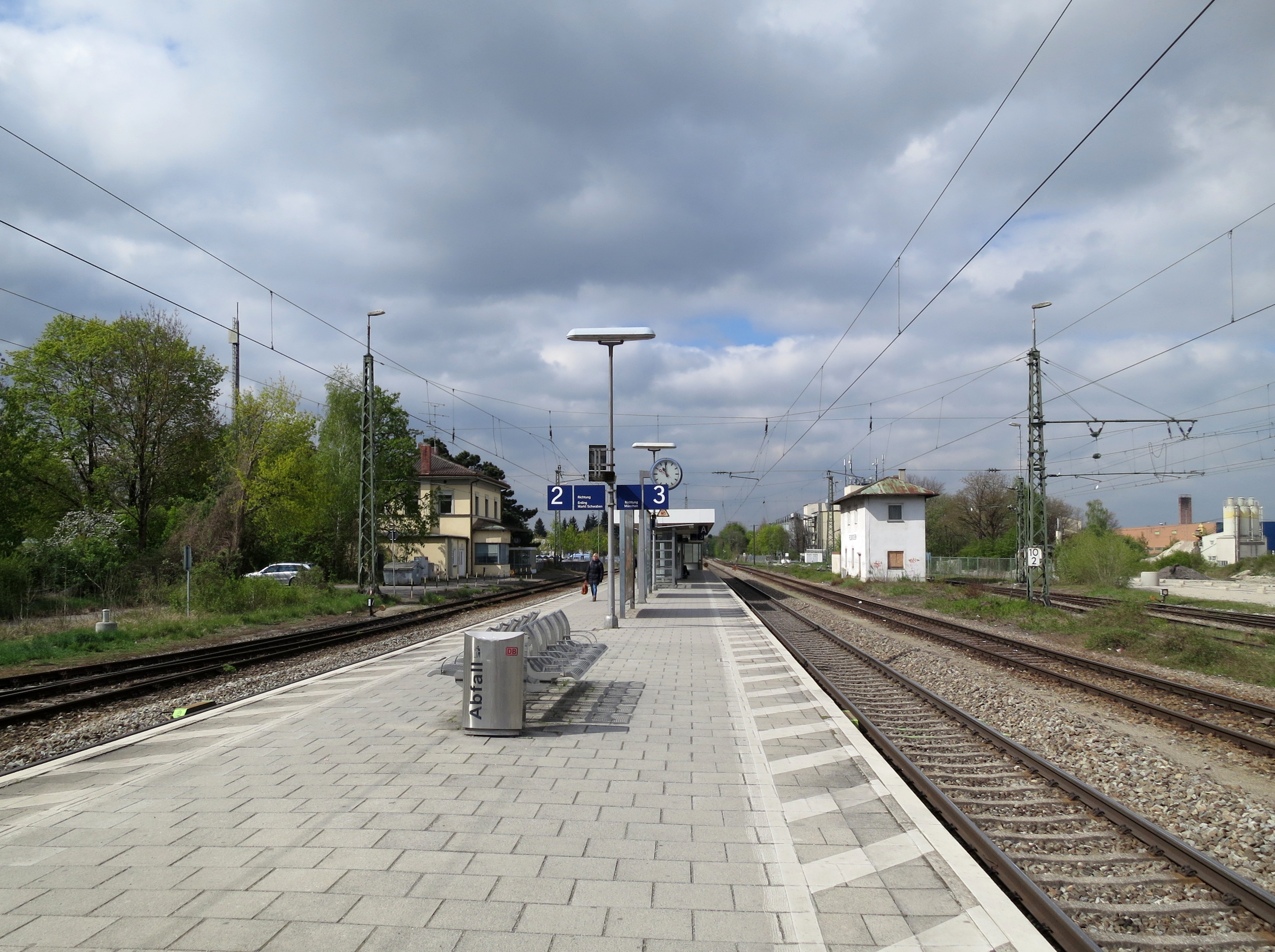
- 2014

General information
- Location: Bahnhofstraße 20; 85622 Feldkirchen; Bavaria; Germany
- Coordinates: 48.1514°N 11.7312°E
- Owner: Deutsche Bahn
- Operator: DB Netz; DB Station&Service
- Lines: Munich–Mühldorf railway (KBS 940)
- Platforms: 1 island platform
- Tracks: 4
- Train operators: S-Bahn München
- Connections: 230, 234, 263

Construction
- Parking: yes
- Cycle facilities: yes
- Accessible: no

Other information
- Station code: 1774
- DS100 code: MFK
- IBNR: 8001973
- Category: 5
- Fare zone: : M and 1
- Website: www.bahnhof.de

History
- Opened: 1 May 1871; 155 years ago

Services
Preceding station	Munich S-Bahn	Following station
Munich-Riem towards Petershausen or Altomünster	S2	Heimstetten towards Erding
Location
- Location within Bavaria Location within Germany Location within Europe

Feldkirchen (b München) station (German: Bahnhof Feldkirchen (b München)) is a railway station in the municipality of Feldkirchen, located in the Munich district in Bavaria, Germany.
