= Munich-Karlsfeld station =

Railway station in Bavaria, Germany

München Karlsfeld
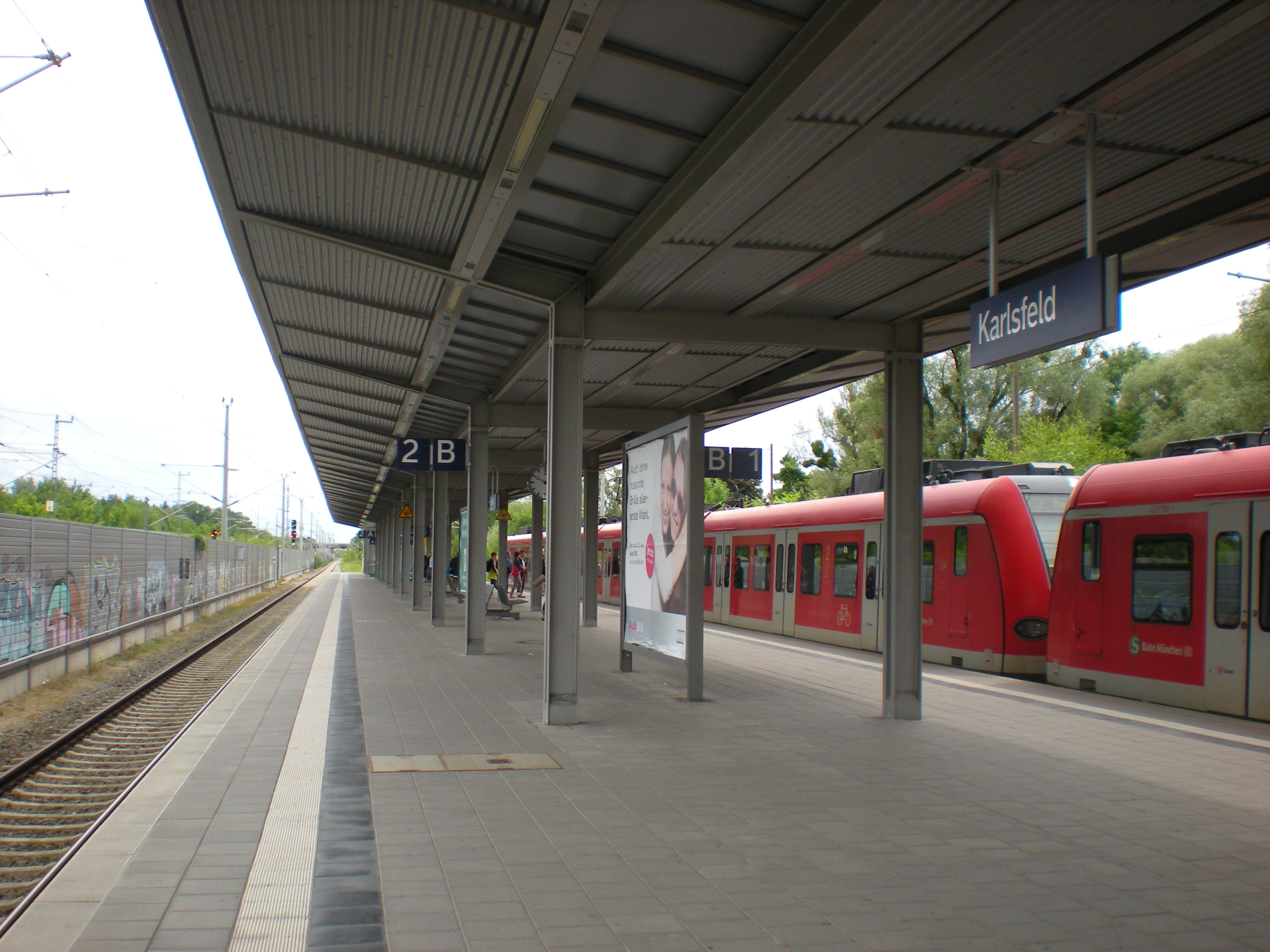

General information
- Location: Zum Schwabenbächl 39; 80997 München, Bavaria; Germany
- Coordinates: 48°12′38.8″N 11°27′35.0″E
- Owner: DB Netz
- Operator: DB Station&Service
- Line: Munich–Treuchtlingen railway
- Train operators: S-Bahn München
- Connections: 701, 702, 711, 712

Other information
- Station code: 4257
- DS100 code: MKFS
- IBNR: 8004150
- Category: 4
- Fare zone: : M and 1
- Website: www.bahnhof.de

History
- Opened: 1 May 1896; 130 years ago

Services
Preceding station	Munich S-Bahn	Following station
Dachau Bahnhof towards Petershausen or Altomünster	S2	Allach towards Erding
Location

Munich-Karlsfeld station is a railway station in the municipality of Karlsfeld, located in the district of Dachau in Upper Bavaria, Germany.

== Location ==
The northern area of the station is located in the municipality of Karlsfeld and has an eastern access from the Wehrstaudenstrasse and a western access from the Bayernwerkstraße.

The southern area of the station is located in the city of Munich (borough Allach-Untermenzing) and has an eastern (Zum Schwabenbächl) and a western access (Eversbuschstraße).
