= Bad Aibling station =

Railway station in Bad Aibling

Bad Aibling
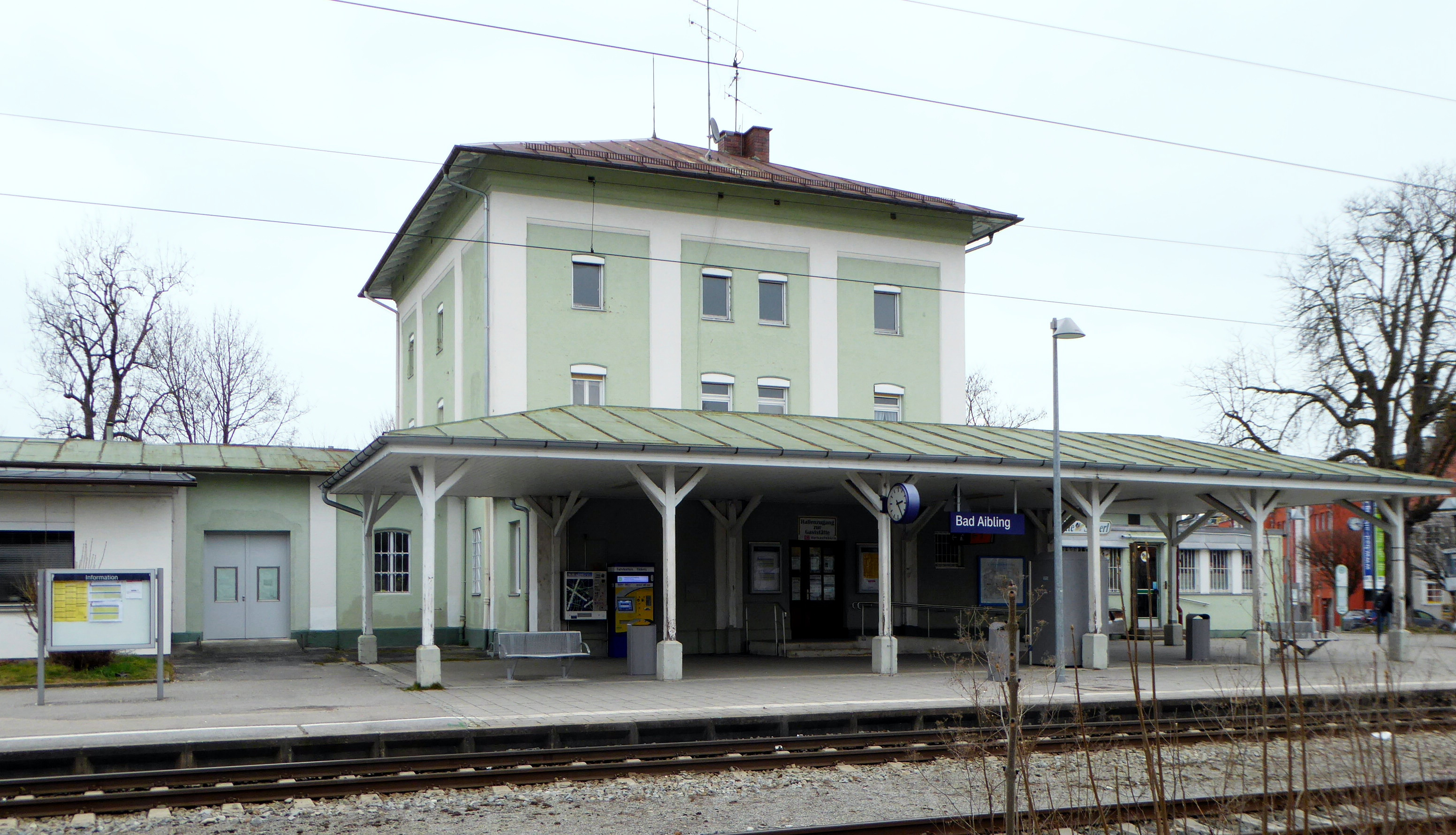

General information
- Location: Bahnhofplatz 40; 83043 Bad Aibling; Bavaria; Germany
- Coordinates: 47.8622°N 12.0043°E
- Owner: Deutsche Bahn
- Operator: DB Netz; DB Station&Service
- Line: Mangfall Valley Railway
- Platforms: 2 side platforms
- Tracks: 2
- Train operators: Bayerische Regiobahn

Other information
- Station code: 246
- DS100 code: MBAI
- IBNR: 8000690
- Category: 5
- Website: www.bahnhof.de

Services
Preceding station		Following station
Heufeld towards München Hbf	RB 58	Bad Aibling Kurpark towards Rosenheim
Location
- Location within Bavaria Location within Germany Location within Europe

Bad Aibling station is a railway station in the city of Bad Aibling, located in the Rosenheim district in Upper Bavaria, Germany.

== History ==
The station was erected in the 19th century for the Mangfall Valley Railway. Officially put in to service on October 31, 1857, the station is now operated by the Deutsche Bahn AG and used for heavy and regional trains.

In direct vicinity to the Bad Aibling station a second station served as a railway terminus for an electrified branch line to Bad Feilnbach that it now dismantled.

== Accidents and incidents ==
On the route between Bad Aibling and Kolbermoor on May 28, 1945, military train full of soldiers collided head on with an empty train. The accident, which occurred in a forest about 2 kilometres eastbound of the Bad Aibling station, took five lives and caused 21 injured, some seriously. Contributory cause was the interruption of telephone and communication lines between Bad Aibling and Kolbermoor at the end of World War II.

On 9 February 2016 the Bad Aibling rail accident occurred only 700m from the location of the 1945 accident when two passenger trains were involved in a head-on collision near Bad Aibling. Several people were killed and many more were injured.

== See also ==
- Bad Aibling Station, a similarly named dismantled satellite tracking station operated by the Bundesnachrichtendienst and a former NSA facility.
