= Feucht Ost station =

Railway station in Germany

Feucht Ost
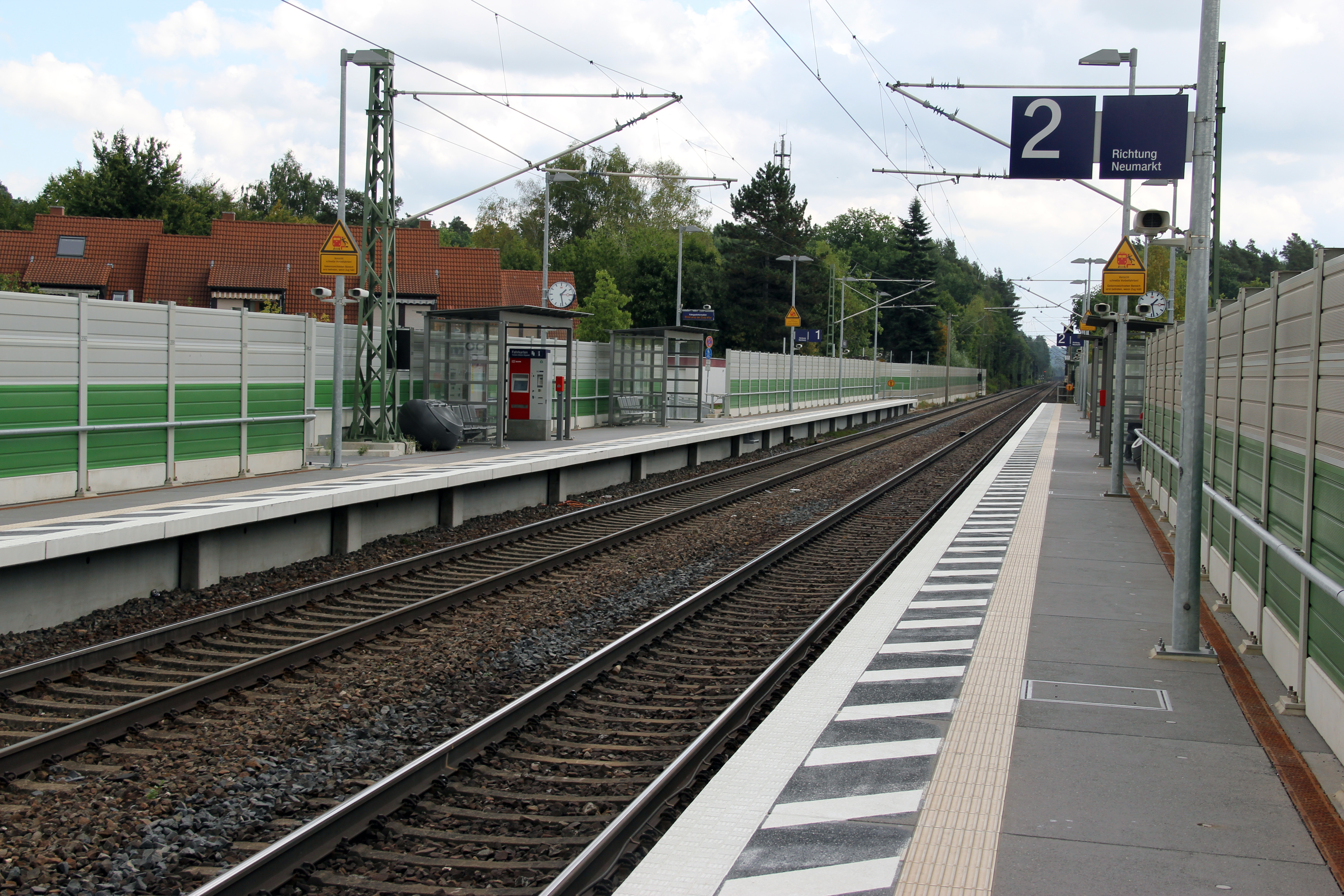
- The station in 2012

General information
- Location: Troppauer Straße; Feucht, Bavaria; Germany
- Coordinates: 49°22′34″N 11°13′14″E
- Owner: DB Netz
- Operator: DB Station&Service
- Lines: Nuremberg–Regensburg line (KBS 880)
- Distance: 86.6 km (53.8 mi) from Regensburg Hauptbahnhof
- Platforms: 2 side platforms
- Tracks: 2
- Train operators: DB Regio Bayern

Other information
- Station code: 8140
- DS100 code: NFTO
- IBNR: 8001988
- Category: 6
- Fare zone: VGN: 504 and 513
- Website: www.bahnhof.de

History
- Opened: 12 December 2010

Services
Preceding station	Nuremberg S-Bahn	Following station
Feucht towards Bamberg	S1	Ochenbruck towards Neumarkt (Oberpfalz)
Location

Feucht Ost station is a railway station in the eastern part of the municipality of Feucht, located in the Nürnberger Land district in Middle Franconia, Germany. The station is on the Nuremberg–Regensburg line of Deutsche Bahn.
