= Furth (b Deisenhofen) station =

Railway station in Oberhaching, Germany

Furth (b Deisenhofen)
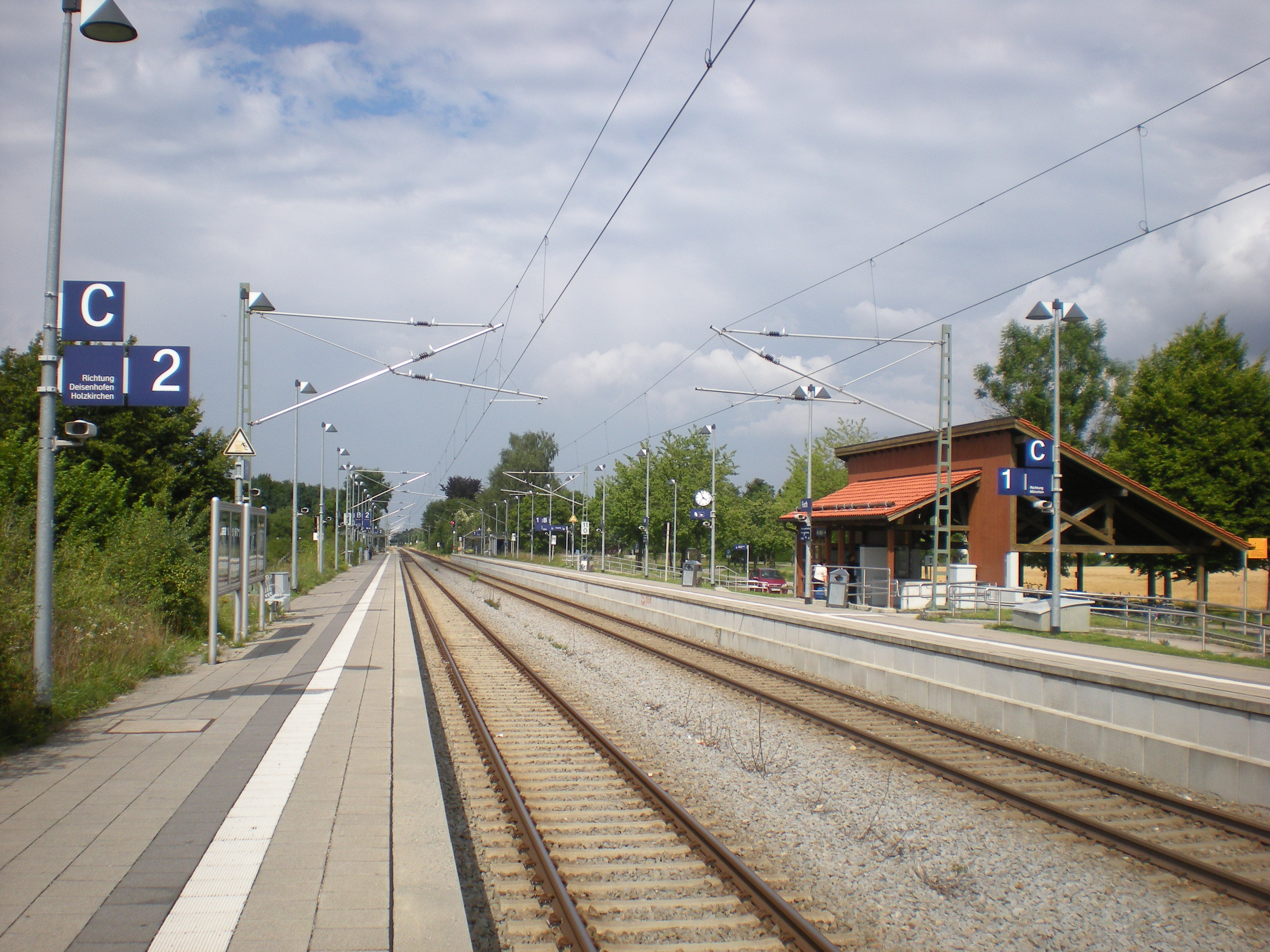
- 2012

General information
- Location: Sommerfeld; 82041 Furth; Bavaria; Germany
- Coordinates: 48.0358°N 11.5936°E
- Owner: Deutsche Bahn
- Operator: DB Netz; DB Station&Service
- Lines: Munich East–Deisenhofen railway (KBS 999.3)
- Platforms: 2 side platforms
- Tracks: 2
- Train operators: S-Bahn München
- Connections: 227

Construction
- Parking: yes
- Cycle facilities: yes
- Accessible: yes

Other information
- Station code: 1983
- DS100 code: MFU
- IBNR: 8002161
- Category: 5
- Fare zone: : M and 1
- Website: www.bahnhof.de

Services
Preceding station	Munich S-Bahn	Following station
Taufkirchen towards Mammendorf	S3	Deisenhofen towards Holzkirchen
Location
- Location within Bavaria Location within Germany Location within Europe

Furth (b Deisenhofen) station (German: Haltepunkt Furth (b Deisenhofen)) is a railway station in the municipality of Furth, located in the Munich district in Bavaria, Germany.
