= Pommelsbrunn =

- Municipality
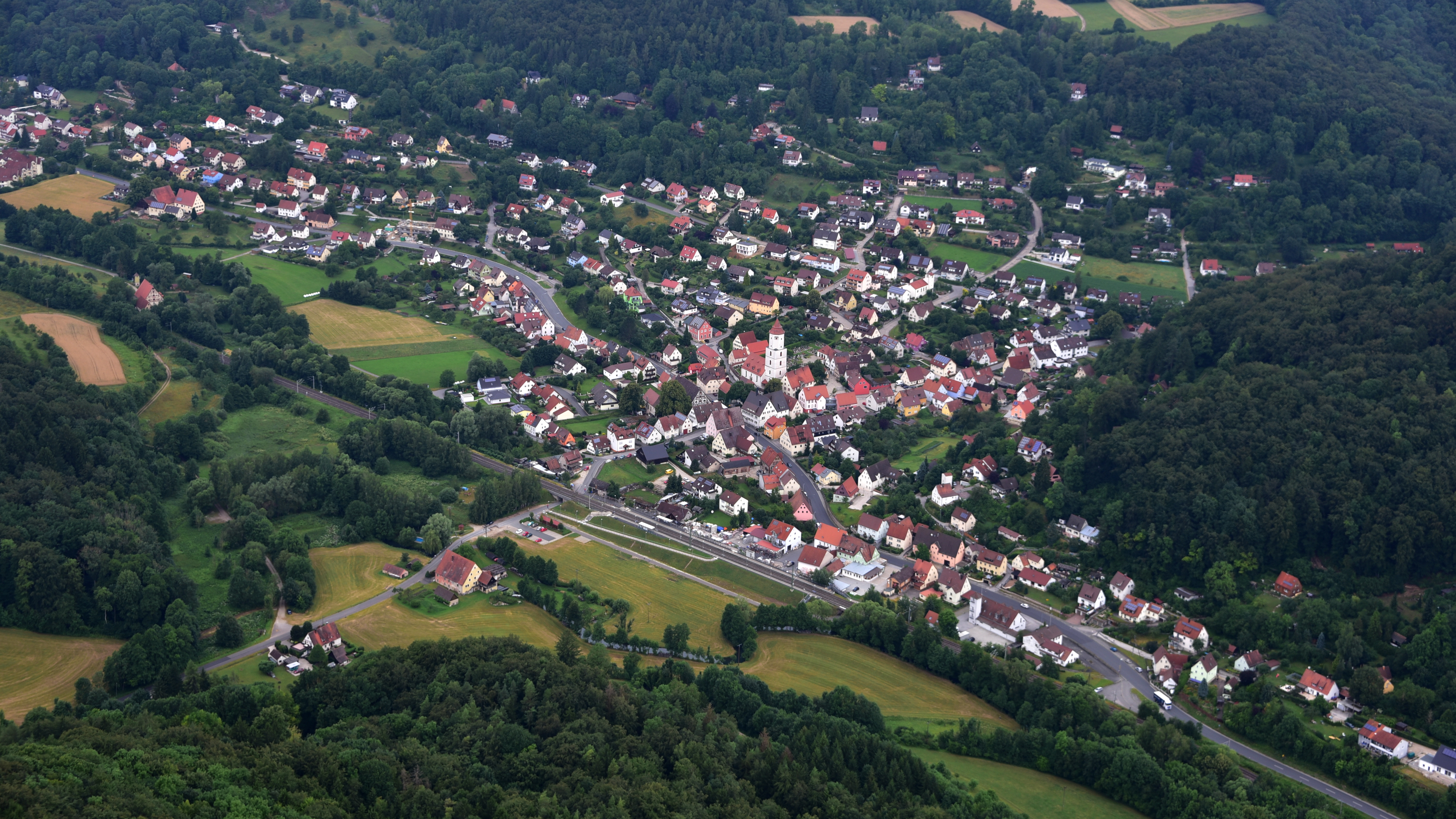
- Aerial view

- Coat of arms

- Location of Pommelsbrunn within Nürnberger Land district
- Interactive map of Pommelsbrunn
- Location within Germany Location within Bavaria
- Coordinates: 49°30′N 11°31′E
- Country: Germany
- State: Bavaria
- Admin. region: Mittelfranken
- District: Nürnberger Land
- Subdivisions: 22 Gemeindeteile

Government
  - Mayor (2023–29): Armin Haushahn

Area
  - Total: 50.05 km^{2} (19.32 sq mi)
- Elevation: 468 m (1,535 ft)

Population (2025-12-31)
  - Total: 5,278
  - Density: 105.5/km^{2} (273.1/sq mi)
- Time zone: UTC+01:00 (CET)
  - Summer (DST): UTC+02:00 (CEST)
- Postal codes: 91224
- Dialling codes: 09154
- Vehicle registration: LAU, ESB, HEB, N, PEG
- Website: www.pommelsbrunn.de

Pommelsbrunn (German pronunciation: [ˈpɔml̩sbʁʊn]) is a municipality in the district of Nürnberger Land, Bavaria, Germany.

== Ortsteile ==
Pommelsbrunn comprises 22 boroughs (Ortsteile):

- Althaus
- Appelsberg
- Arzlohe
- Bürtel
- Eschenbach
- Fischbrunn
- Guntersrieth
- Hartmannshof
- Hegendorf
- Heldmannsberg
- Heuchling
- Hofstetten
- Hohenstadt
- Hubmersberg
- Hunas
- Kleinviehberg
- Mittelburg
- Pommelsbrunn
- Reckenberg
- Stallbaum
- Waizenfeld
- Wüllersdorf
