= Feucht station =

Railway station in Germany

Feucht
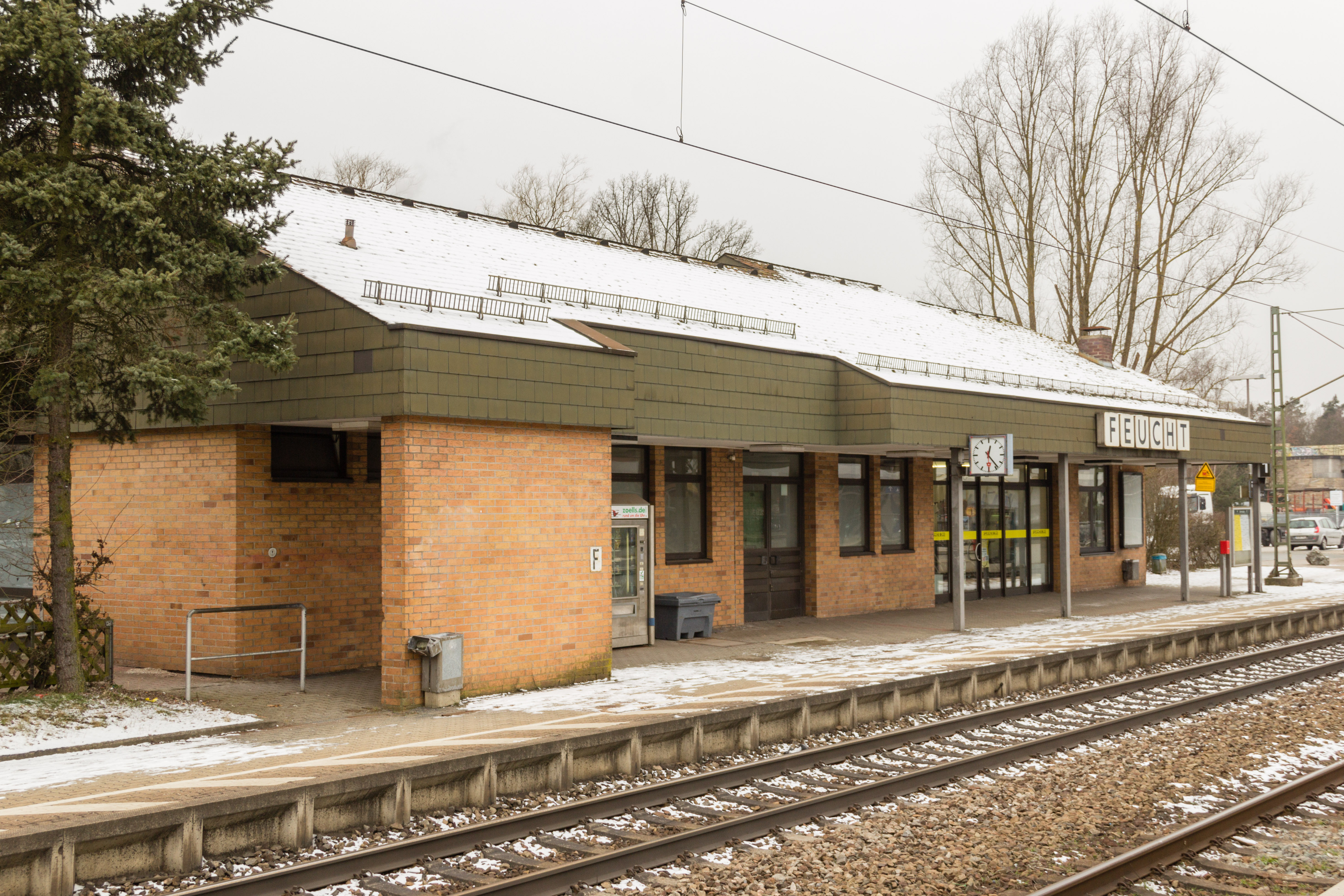
- The station building in 2018

General information
- Location: Bahnhofstraße 32; Feucht, Bavaria; Germany
- Coordinates: 49°22′55″N 11°12′15″E
- Owner: DB Netz
- Operator: DB Station&Service
- Lines: Feucht–Altdorf line; Nuremberg–Feucht line; Nuremberg–Regensburg line
- Distance: 12.5 km (7.8 mi) from Nürnberg Hauptbahnhof
- Platforms: 2 island platforms; 1 side platform
- Tracks: 5
- Train operators: DB Regio Bayern

Other information
- Station code: 1783
- DS100 code: NFT
- IBNR: 8001978
- Category: 3
- Fare zone: VGN: 504 and 513
- Website: www.bahnhof.de

History
- Opened: 1 December 1871

Services
Preceding station	Nuremberg S-Bahn	Following station
Nürnberg Hbf towards Bamberg	S1	Feucht Ost towards Neumarkt (Oberpfalz)
Fischbach (b Nürnberg) towards Nürnberg Hbf	S3	Feucht-Moosbach towards Altdorf
Location

Feucht station is a railway station in the northwest of the municipality of Feucht, located in the Nürnberger Land district in Middle Franconia, Germany. The station is located at the junction of three Deutsche Bahn railway lines: Feucht–Altdorf, Nuremberg–Feucht, and Nuremberg–Regensburg.
