= Hartmannshof station =

Railway station in Germany

Hartmannshof
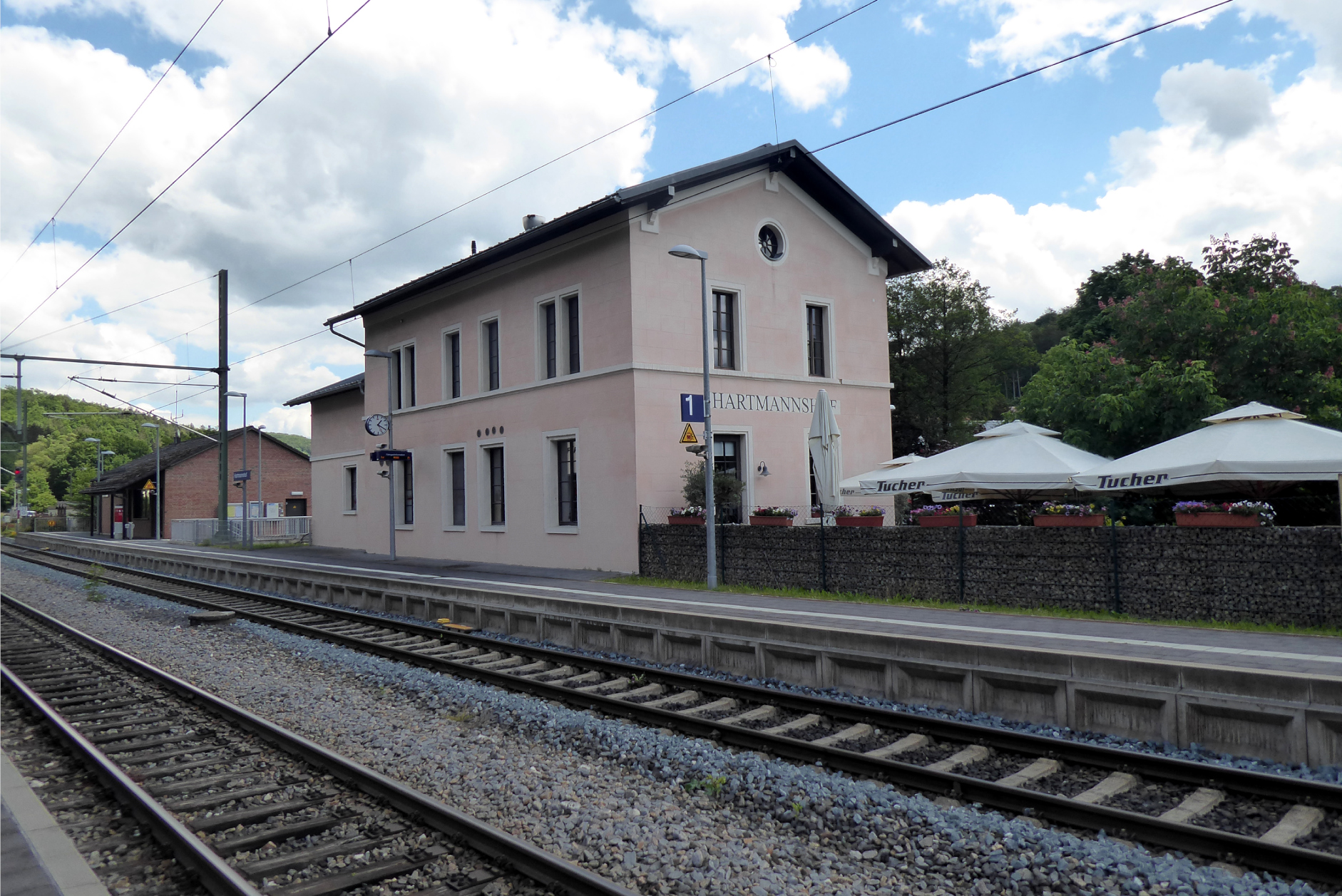
- The station in 2022

General information
- Location: Bahnhofstraße 7 Pommelsbrunn, Bavaria; Germany
- Coordinates: 49°29′56″N 11°33′16″E
- Owner: DB Netz
- Operator: DB Station&Service
- Lines: Nuremberg–Schwandorf line (KBS 870) (KBS 890.1)
- Distance: 37.0 km (23.0 mi) from Nürnberg Hauptbahnhof
- Platforms: 1 island platform; 1 side platform
- Tracks: 3
- Train operators: DB Regio Bayern

Other information
- Station code: 2574
- DS100 code: NHS
- IBNR: 8002612
- Category: 5
- Fare zone: VGN: 551 and 552
- Website: www.bahnhof.de

History
- Opened: 1858

Services
Preceding station	DB Regio Bayern	Following station
Hersbruck (rechts Pegnitz) towards Nürnberg Hbf	RE 40	Etzelwang towards Regensburg Hbf
Hersbruck (rechts Pegnitz) towards Nürnberg Hbf	RE 41	Etzelwang towards Neustadt (Waldnaab)
Hersbruck (rechts Pegnitz) towards Nürnberg Hbf	RE 47 Limited service	Etzelwang towards Furth im Wald
Preceding station	Nuremberg S-Bahn	Following station
Pommelsbrunn towards Roth	S2	Terminus
Location

Hartmannshof station is a railway station in the Hartmannshof district of the municipality of Pommelsbrunn, located in the Nürnberger Land district in Middle Franconia, Germany. It is located on the Nuremberg–Schwandorf line of Deutsche Bahn.
