= Roth station =

Railway station in Roth, Germany

Roth
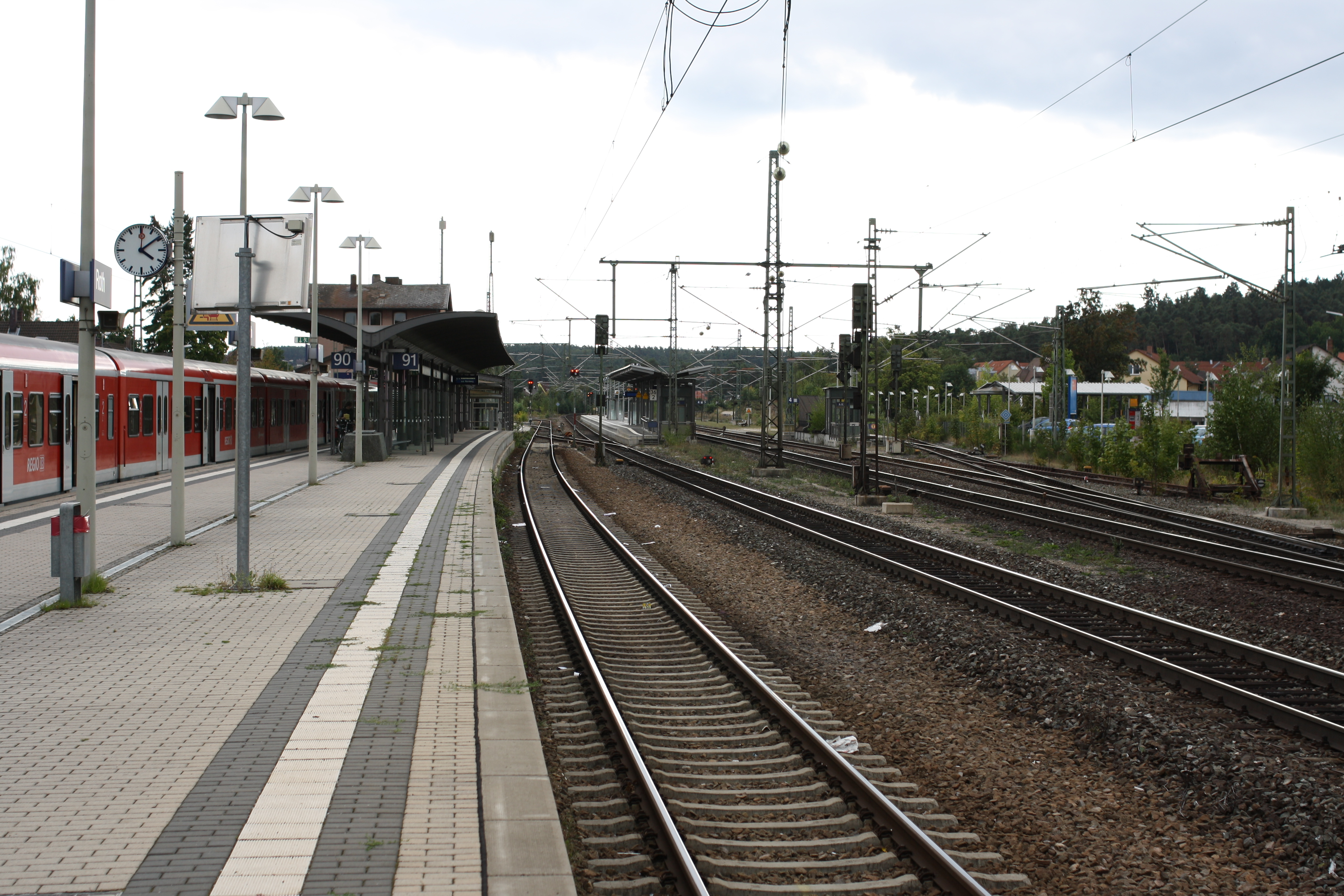
- The station platforms in 2009

General information
- Location: Bahnhofstraße 74; Roth, Bavaria; Germany
- Coordinates: 49°14′28″N 11°04′58″E
- Owner: DB Netz
- Operator: DB Station&Service
- Lines: Nuremberg–Roth line (KBS 890.2); Nuremberg–Augsburg line (KBS 910); Roth–Greding line (KBS 911)
- Distance: 25.5 km (15.8 mi) from Nürnberg Hauptbahnhof
- Platforms: 3 island platforms; 1 side platform
- Tracks: 7
- Train operators: DB Regio Bayern
- Connections: Bus interchange

Other information
- Station code: 5385
- DS100 code: NRO
- IBNR: 8005185
- Category: 3
- Fare zone: VGN: 631 and 632
- Website: www.bahnhof.de

History
- Opened: 1 October 1849

Services
Preceding station	DB Regio Bayern	Following station
Unterheckenhofen towards Augsburg Hbf	RE 16	Schwabach towards Nürnberg Hbf
Georgensgmünd towards Treuchtlingen	RE 60	Schwabach towards Nürnberg Hbf
Unterheckenhofen towards München Hbf	RB 16	Schwabach towards Nürnberg Hbf
Terminus	RB 61	Lohgarten-Roth towards Hilpoltstein
Preceding station	Nuremberg S-Bahn	Following station
Terminus	S2	Büchenbach towards Hartmannshof
Location

Roth station is a railway station in the municipality of Roth, located in the Roth district in Middle Franconia, Germany. The station is located at the junction of the Nuremberg–Roth, Nuremberg–Augsburg, and Roth–Greding lines.
