= Markt Schwaben–Erding railway =

Railway line in Bavaria, Germany

Markt Schwaben–Erding
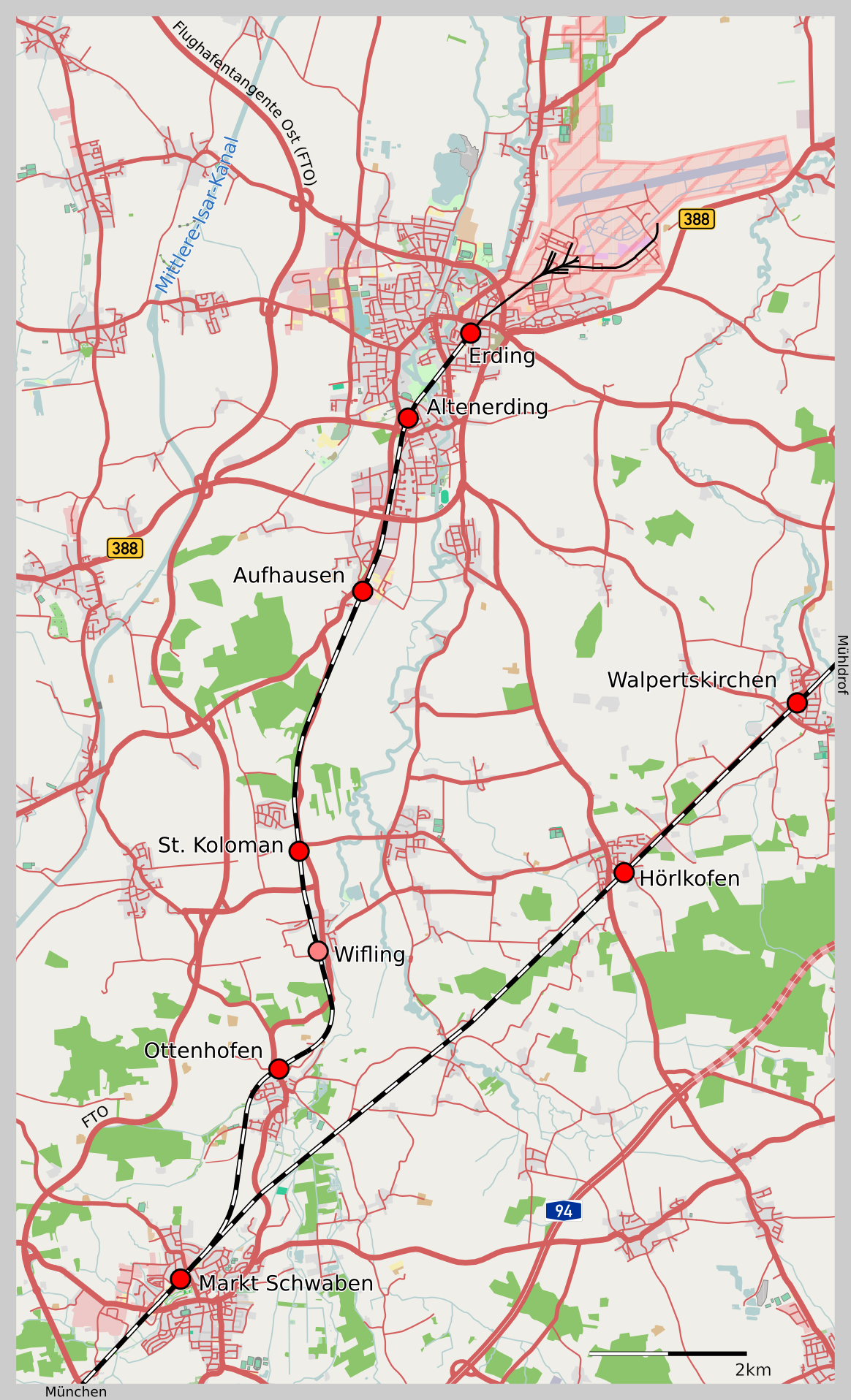

Overview
- Owner: DB Netz
- Line number: 5601
- Locale: Bavaria, Germany

Service
- Route number: 999.2
- Operator(s): S-Bahn München

Technical
- Line length: 13.6 km (8.5 mi)
- Track gauge: 1,435 mm (4 ft 8 1/2 in) standard gauge
- Electrification: 15 kV/16.7 Hz AC overhead catenary

The Markt Schwaben–Erding railway is a 13.63 km-long branch line in Upper Bavaria in Germany and now part of line S 2 of the Munich S-Bahn.

Erding made an unsuccessful bid for the Munich–Mühldorf railway to run through the town; instead it was built a few kilometres south of the town. Other suggested links (to Freising, Passau or Rosenheim) were rejected by the railway board. On 8 March 1869, it was announced that the town would be connected to the railway network by a secondary railway (then called a Vizinalbahn in Bavaria) from Schwaben (now Markt Schwaben) to Erding. The contract for the construction of this railway was signed on 9 May 1870 by the town of Erding and the Head Office of the Royal Transport Institution (German: Generaldirektion der königlichen Verkehrsanstalten). The line was opened on 16 November 1872.

The line branches off the Munich East–Mühldorf line in Markt Schwaben and runs to the north. The next stop is Ottenhofen station. Wifling station was opened in 1922 and was closed on 22 May 1971. This is followed by St. Koloman station, opened on 1 June 1890, and Aufhausen station, which since 1972 has been incorporated in Erding. Altenerding station was opened on 1 May 1899 in the then independent municipality and a second track was built to allow trains to cross in preparation for the introduction of the 20 minute interval services on the Munich S-Bahn in 1981. At Erding Station there was formerly a siding leading to Erding Air Field. The line is single track throughout, with crossing loops at the stations of Ottenhofen and Altenerding. The terminal station of Erding has two tracks next to a central platform and train stabling sidings. Electrification of the line was completed on 7 September 1970. Since 1972, the line has been part of the Munich S-Bahn.

As part of the "Erding Ring Closure" (Erdinger Ringschluss) it is proposed that the line will be extended to the north-west to Munich Airport. The S-Bahn will be extended to Freising. The "Walpertskirchen Clasp" (Walpertskirchener Spange) to the Munich–Mühldorf line would also provide a connection to the east.

Line	Route	Frequency
S2	Petershausen – Vierkirchen-Esterhofen – Röhrmoos – Hebertshausen / Altomünster – Kleinberghofen – Erdweg – Arnbach – Markt Indersdorf – Niederroth – Schwabhausen – Bachern – Dachau Stadt – Dachau Bahnhof – Karlsfeld – Allach – Untermenzing – Obermenzing – Laim – Hirschgarten – Donnersbergerbrücke – Hackerbrücke – Hauptbahnhof – Karlsplatz (Stachus) – Marienplatz – Isartor – Rosenheimer Platz – Ostbahnhof – Leuchtenbergring – Berg am Laim – Riem – Feldkirchen – Heimstetten – Grub – Poing – Markt Schwaben – Ottenhofen – St. Koloman – Aufhausen – Altenerding – Erding	Every 20 minutes (Every 10 minutes in the peaks)
