= Ottenhofen (Oberbayern) station =

Munich S-Bahn station

Ottenhofen (Oberbayern)

General information
- Location: Raiffeisenstraße 13; 85570 Ottenhofen; Bavaria; Germany
- Coordinates: 48.2182°N 11.8794°E
- Owner: Deutsche Bahn
- Operator: DB Netz; DB Station&Service
- Lines: Markt Schwaben–Erding railway (KBS 999.2)
- Platforms: 1 island platform
- Tracks: 2
- Train operators: S-Bahn München
- Connections: 507

Other information
- Station code: 4825
- DS100 code: MONH
- IBNR: 8004723
- Category: 5
- Fare zone: : 3 and 4
- Website: www.bahnhof.de

History
- Opened: 16 November 1872; 153 years ago

Services
Preceding station	Munich S-Bahn	Following station
Markt Schwaben towards Petershausen or Altomünster	S2	St. Koloman towards Erding
Location

Ottenhofen (Oberbayern) station is a railway station in the municipality of Ottenhofen, located in the Erding district in Upper Bavaria, Germany.
