= St. Koloman station =

Munich S-Bahn station

St Koloman

General information
- Location: St2080/ED4; 85457 Wörth; Bavaria; Germany
- Coordinates: 48.2436°N 11.8829°E
- Owner: DB Netz
- Operator: DB Station&Service
- Lines: Markt Schwaben–Erding railway (KBS 999.2)
- Platforms: 1 side platform
- Tracks: 1
- Train operators: S-Bahn München
- Connections: 445

Other information
- Station code: 5944
- DS100 code: MKL
- IBNR: 8005652
- Category: 6
- Fare zone: : 3 and 4
- Website: www.bahnhof.de

History
- Opened: 1 June 1890; 136 years ago

Services
Preceding station	Munich S-Bahn	Following station
Ottenhofen (Oberbayern) towards Petershausen or Altomünster	S2	Aufhausen (bei Erding) towards Erding
Location
- Location within Bavaria Location within Germany Location within Europe

St. Koloman station is a railway station in the St. Koloman district of the municipality of Wörth, located in the Erding district in Upper Bavaria, Germany.
