= Schwabhausen (bei Dachau) station =

Railway station in Schwabhausen, Germany

Schwabhausen (b Dachau)
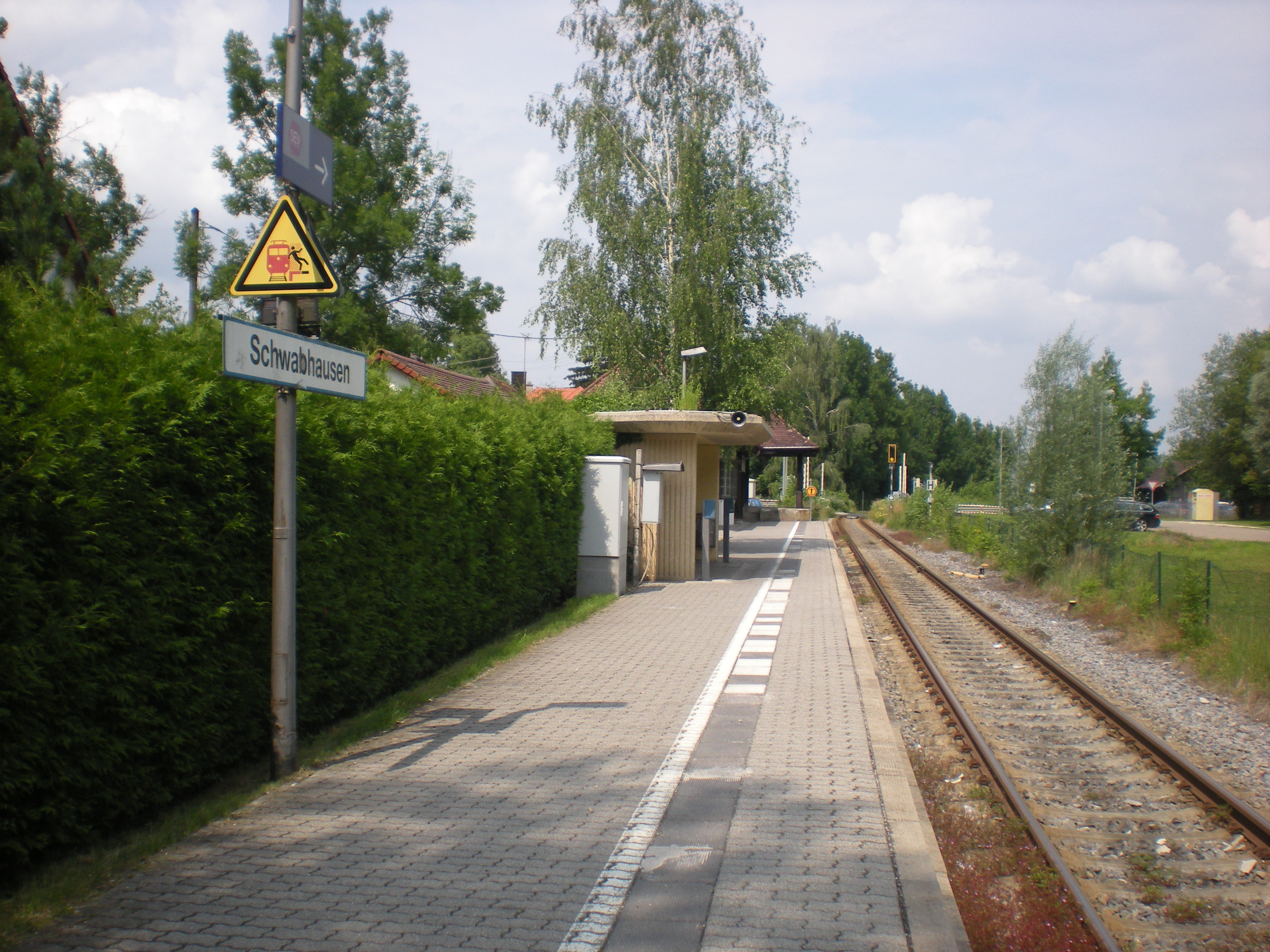
- 2013

General information
- Location: Am Bahnhof; 85247 Schwabhausen; Bavaria; Germany
- Coordinates: 48.3004°N 11.3647°E
- Elevation: 496 m (1,627 ft)
- Owner: DB Netz
- Operator: DB Station&Service
- Lines: Dachau–Altomünster railway (KBS 999.2)
- Platforms: 2 side platforms
- Tracks: 2
- Train operators: S-Bahn München
- Connections: 704, 705, 791, 7000, 7050, X730

Other information
- Station code: 5698
- DS100 code: MSHH
- IBNR: 8005442
- Category: 6
- Fare zone: : 2 and 3
- Website: www.bahnhof.de

History
- Opened: 8 July 1912; 114 years ago

Services
Preceding station	Munich S-Bahn	Following station
Niederroth towards Altomünster	S2	Bachern towards Erding
Location
- Location within Bavaria Location within Germany Location within Europe

Schwabhausen (bei Dachau) station is a railway station in the municipality of Schwabhausen, located in the district of Dachau in Upper Bavaria, Germany.
