= Erdweg station =

Railway station in Germany

Erdweg

General information
- Location: Hauptstraße; 85253 Erdweg; Bavaria; Germany
- Coordinates: 48.3331°N 11.3043°E
- Elevation: 475 m (1,558 ft)
- Owner: DB Netz
- Operator: DB Station&Service
- Lines: Dachau–Altomünster railway (KBS 999.2)
- Platforms: 2 side platforms
- Tracks: 2
- Train operators: S-Bahn München
- Connections: 703, 704, 705, 785, 7030, 7050

Other information
- Station code: 1630
- DS100 code: MEWG
- IBNR: 8001829
- Category: 6
- Fare zone: : 3 and 4
- Website: www.bahnhof.de

History
- Opened: 13 December 1913; 112 years ago

Services
Preceding station	Munich S-Bahn	Following station
Kleinberghofen towards Altomünster	S2	Arnbach towards Erding
Location
- Location within Bavaria Location within Germany Location within Europe

Erdweg station is a railway station in the municipality of Erdweg, located in the district of Dachau in Upper Bavaria, Germany.
