= Arnbach station =

Railway station in Germany

Arnbach

General information
- Location: Am Kühberg; 85247 Schwabhausen; Bavaria; Germany
- Coordinates: 48.3411°N 11.3434°E
- Owner: DB Netz
- Operator: DB Station&Service
- Lines: Dachau–Altomünster railway (KBS 999.2)
- Platforms: 1 side platform
- Tracks: 1
- Train operators: S-Bahn München
- Connections: 791 (from Arnbach Maibaum stop)

Other information
- Station code: 176
- DS100 code: MANB
- IBNR: 8000603
- Category: 7
- Fare zone: : 3 and 4
- Website: www.bahnhof.de

History
- Opened: 13 December 1913; 112 years ago

Services
Preceding station	Munich S-Bahn	Following station
Erdweg towards Altomünster	S2	Markt Indersdorf towards Erding
Location
- Location within Bavaria Location within Germany Location within Europe

Arnbach station is a railway station in the Arnbach district in the municipality of Schwabhausen, located in the district of Dachau in Upper Bavaria, Germany.
