= Munich-Obermenzing station =

Railway station in Munich, Germany

München Obermenzing
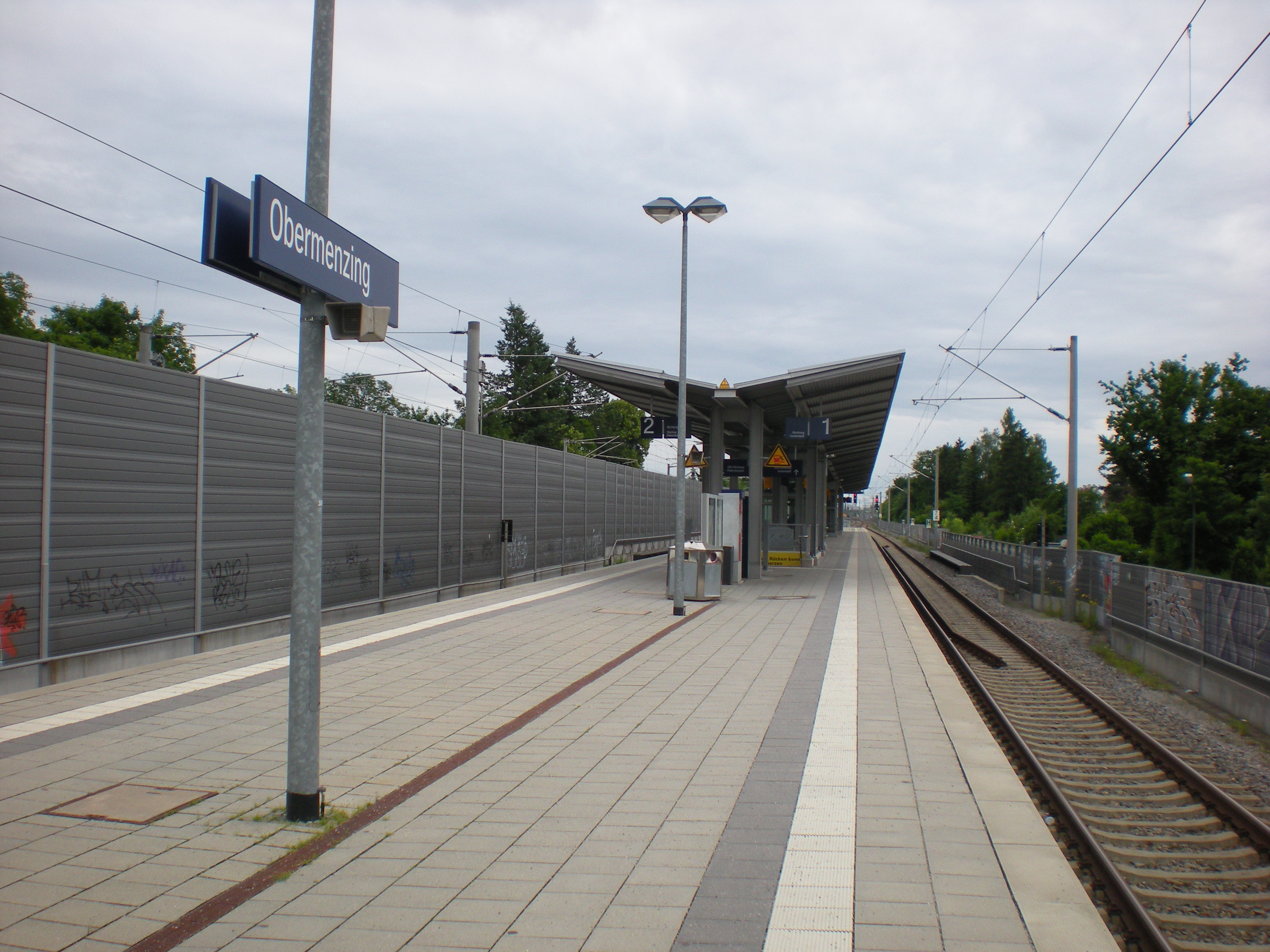
- 2012

General information
- Location: Verdistraße 46a 81247 München; Pasing-Obermenzing, Bavaria; Germany
- Coordinates: 48°09′51.6″N 11°28′40.7″E
- Elevation: 518 m (1,699 ft)
- Owner: DB Netz
- Operator: DB Station&Service
- Line: Munich–Treuchtlingen railway
- Train operators: S-Bahn München
- Connections: 143, 158, 162, 180, N78

Other information
- Station code: 4265
- DS100 code: MOZ
- IBNR: 8004157
- Category: 4
- Fare zone: : M and 1
- Website: www.bahnhof.de

History
- Opened: 23 December 1905; 120 years ago

Services
Preceding station	Munich S-Bahn	Following station
Untermenzing towards Petershausen or Altomünster	S2	Laim towards Erding
Location

Munich-Obermenzing station is a railway station in the Pasing-Obermenzing borough of Munich, Germany.
