= Kleinberghofen station =

Railway station in Germany

Kleinberghofen
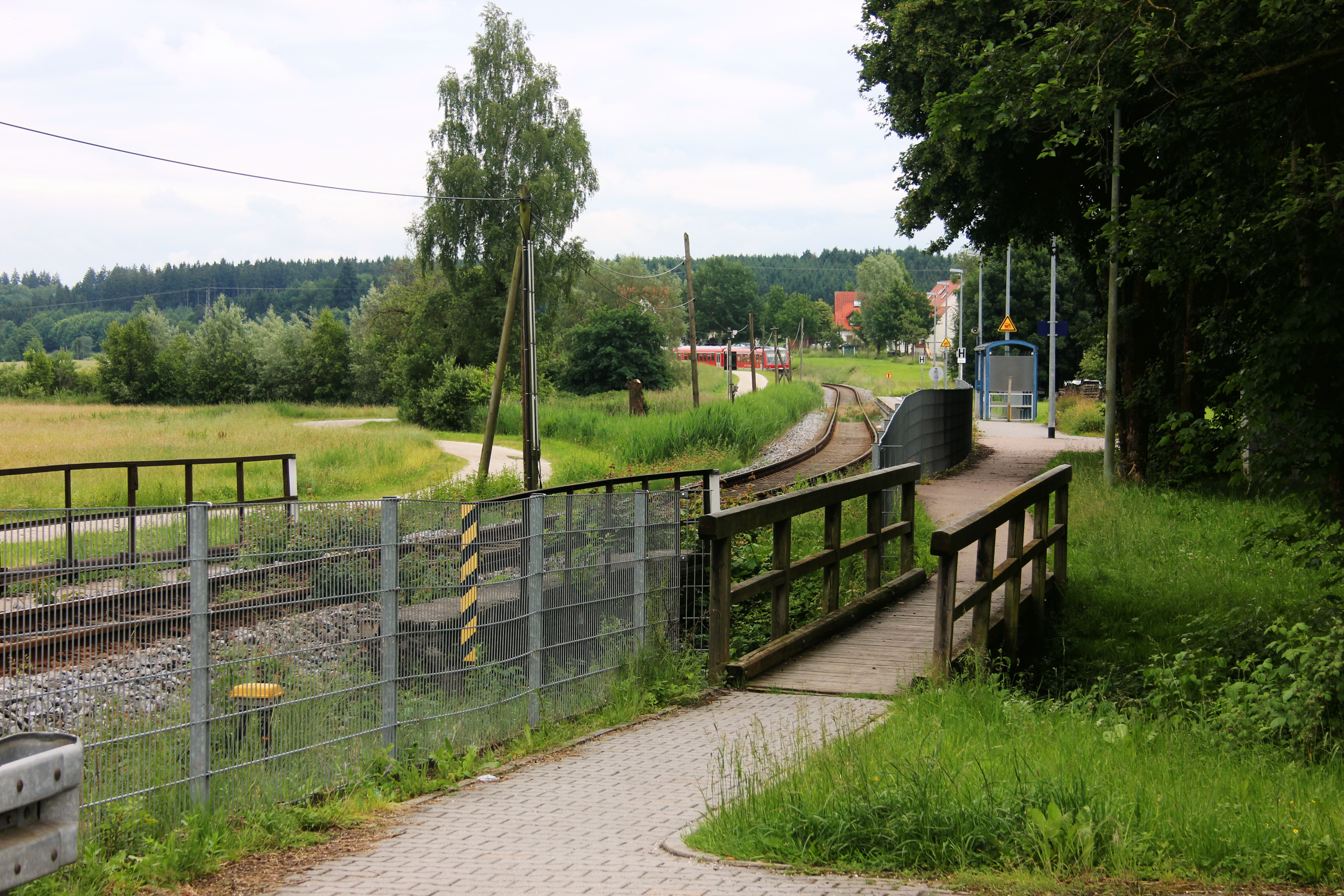
- 2012

General information
- Location: St.-Martin-Straße; 85253 Erdweg; Bavaria; Germany
- Coordinates: 48.35397°N 11.27545°E
- Owner: DB Netz
- Operator: DB Station&Service
- Lines: Dachau–Altomünster railway (KBS 999.2)
- Platforms: 1 side platform
- Tracks: 1
- Train operators: S-Bahn München
- Connections: 704, 705, 715

Other information
- Station code: 3242
- DS100 code: MKHN
- IBNR: 8003317
- Category: 6
- Fare zone: : 4
- Website: www.bahnhof.de

History
- Opened: 13 December 1913; 112 years ago

Services
| Preceding station | Munich S-Bahn | Following station |
|---|---|---|
| Altomünster Terminus | S2 | Erdweg towards Erding |
Location
- Location within Bavaria Location within Germany Location within Europe

Kleinberghofen station is a railway station in the Kleinberghofen district in the municipality of Erdweg, located in the Dachau district in Upper Bavaria, Germany.
