= Munich-Allach station =

Railway station in Bavaria, Germany

München Allach
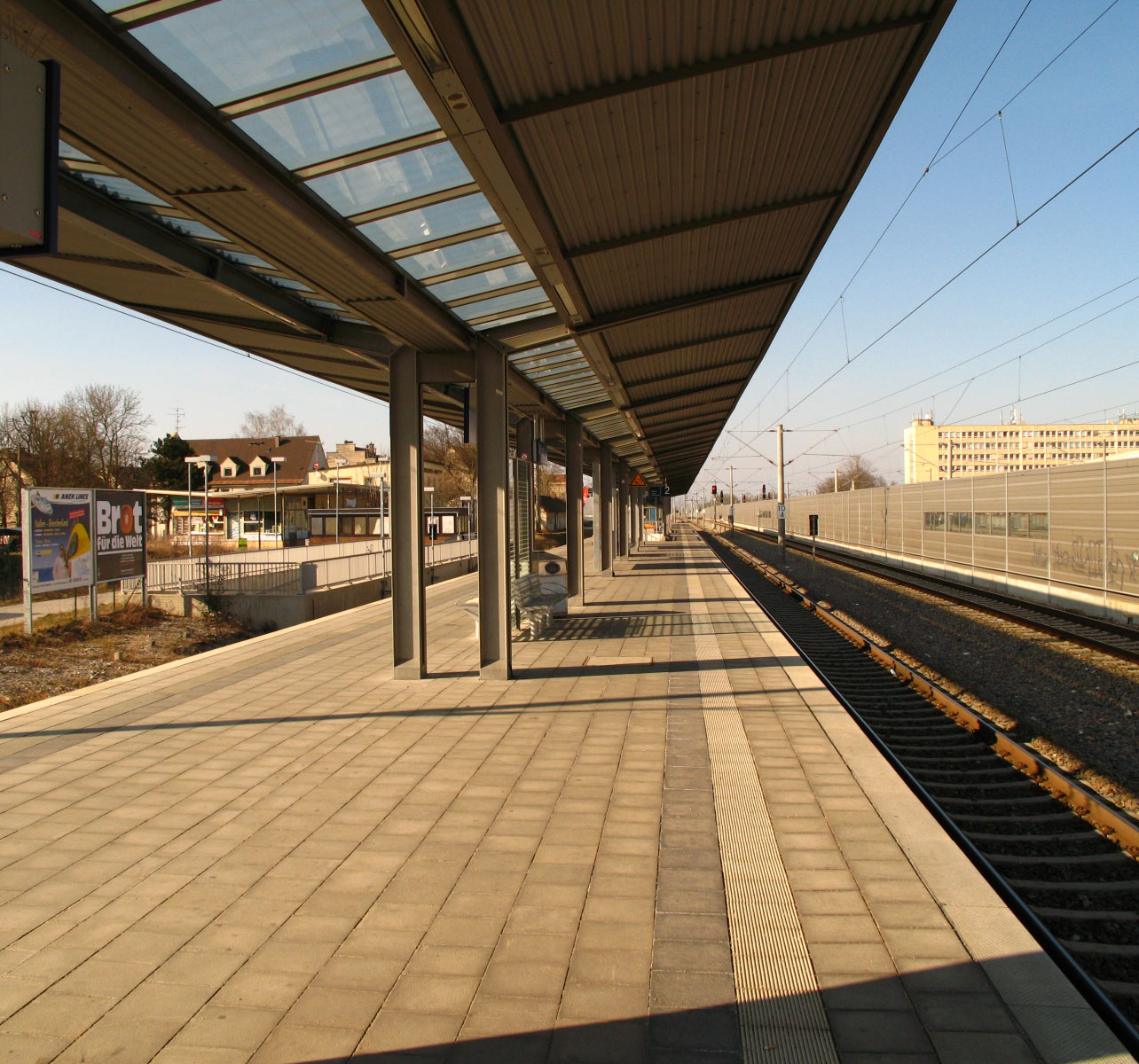
- 2008

General information
- Location: Oertelplatz 4; 80999 München; Bavaria; Allach-Untermenzing; Germany
- Coordinates: 48°11′22.9″N 11°28′04.8″E
- Elevation: 508 m (1,667 ft)
- Owner: Deutsche Bahn
- Operator: DB Netz; DB Station&Service
- Line: Munich–Treuchtlingen railway
- Train operators: S-Bahn München
- Connections: 160, 163, 164, 165, 706, X36

Other information
- Station code: 4246
- DS100 code: MMAL
- IBNR: 8004140
- Category: 4
- Fare zone: : M and 1
- Website: www.bahnhof.de

History
- Opened: 14 November 1867; 158 years ago
- Electrified: 1 July 1934; 92 years ago

Services
Preceding station	Munich S-Bahn	Following station
Karlsfeld towards Petershausen or Altomünster	S2	Untermenzing towards Erding
Location

Munich-Allach station is a railway station in the Allach-Untermenzing borough of Munich, Germany.

It is on the Munich - Ingolstadt route, and the first train was seen here in 1867. It is connected to the locomotive factory in the East, formerly Kraus-Maffei, now Siemens Mobility production.

The station is served by the Munich S-Bahn's S2 line. The line connects Allach to Munich Eastern Station (München Ost), ending in Altomünster or Petershausen in the Northwest, or Erding in North-East.
