= Munich-Berg am Laim station =

Munich S-Bahn station

München Berg am Laim
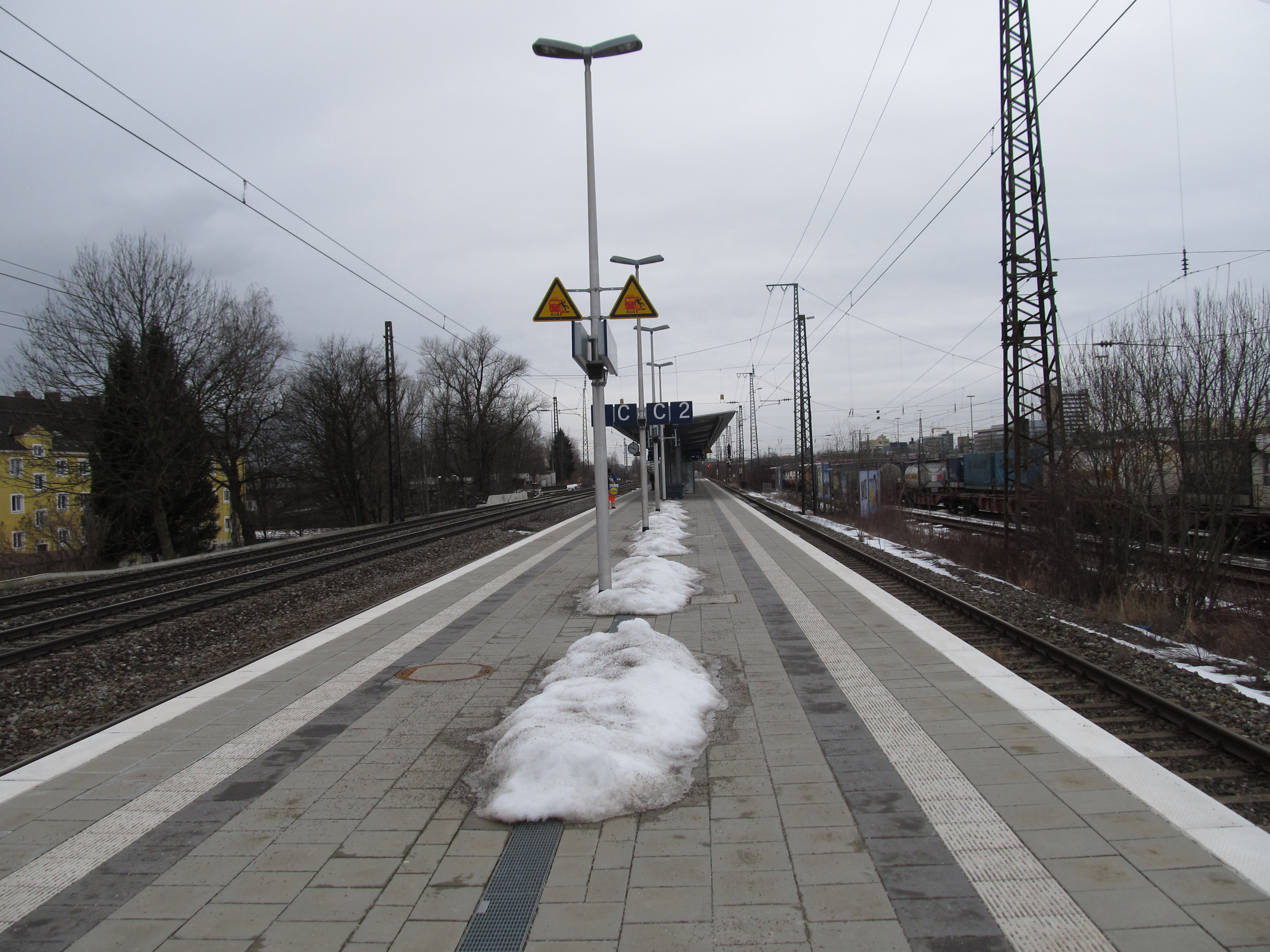
- 2012

General information
- Location: Baumkirchner Str., Berg am Laim, Bavaria
- Coordinates: 48°08′03″N 11°38′01″E
- Owner: Deutsche Bahn
- Operator: DB Netz; DB Station&Service
- Lines: Munich–Mühldorf (KBS 940 / 999.2); Munich–Rosenheim (KBS 950 / 951 / 999.4)
- Platforms: 1 island platform
- Tracks: 2
- Train operators: S-Bahn München
- Connections: 185, 187, 190, 191

Construction
- Accessible: Yes

Other information
- Station code: 4248
- DS100 code: MBAL
- IBNR: 8004142
- Category: 4
- Fare zone: : M
- Website: www.bahnhof.de; stationsdatenbank.de

History
- Opened: 1 May 1897

Services
Preceding station	Munich S-Bahn	Following station
Leuchtenbergring towards Petershausen or Altomünster	S2	Riem towards Erding
Leuchtenbergring towards Geltendorf	S4	Trudering towards Ebersberg
Leuchtenbergring towards Tutzing	S6	Trudering towards Ebersberg
Location

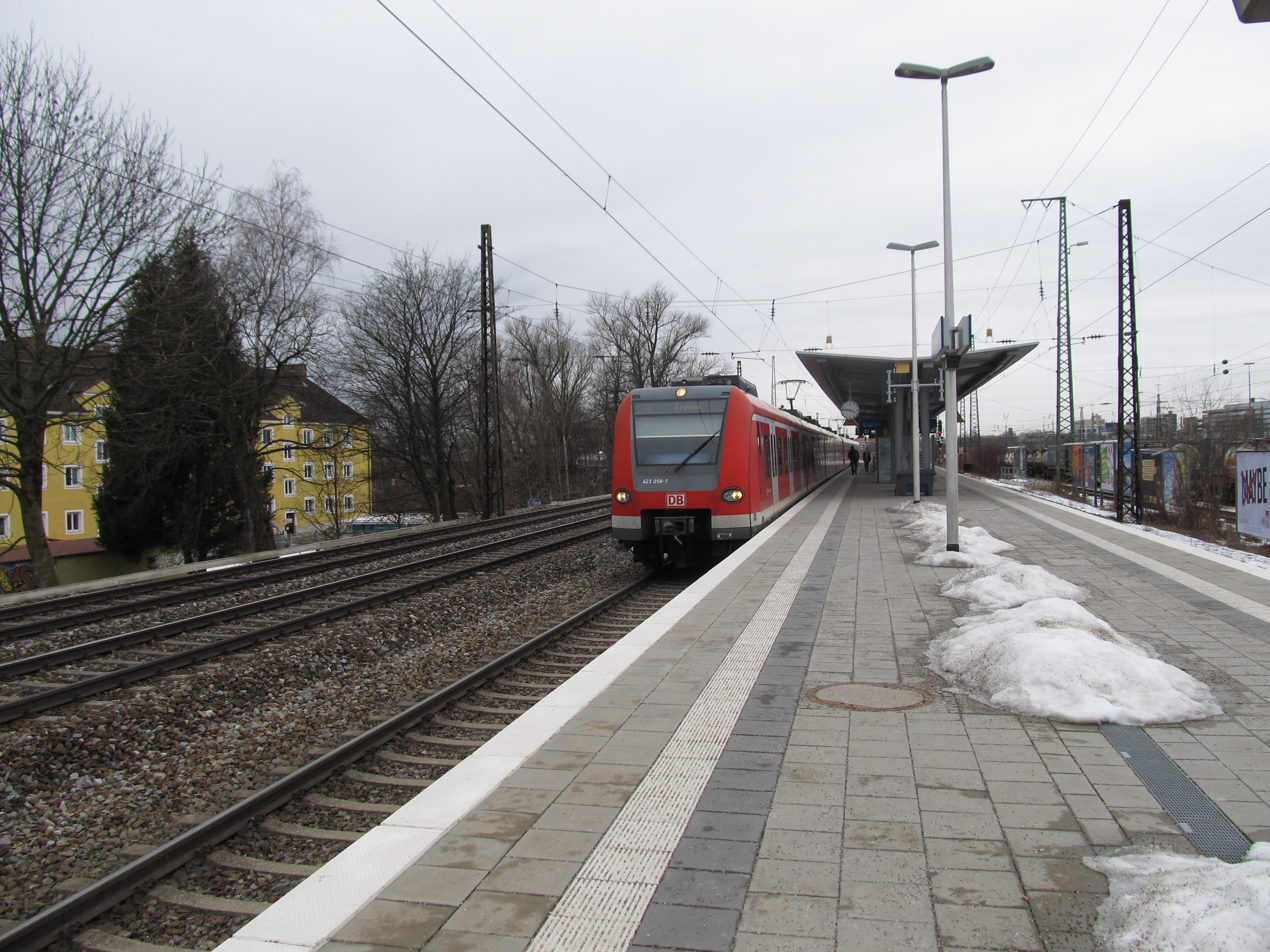
S-Bahn line 2 to Erding

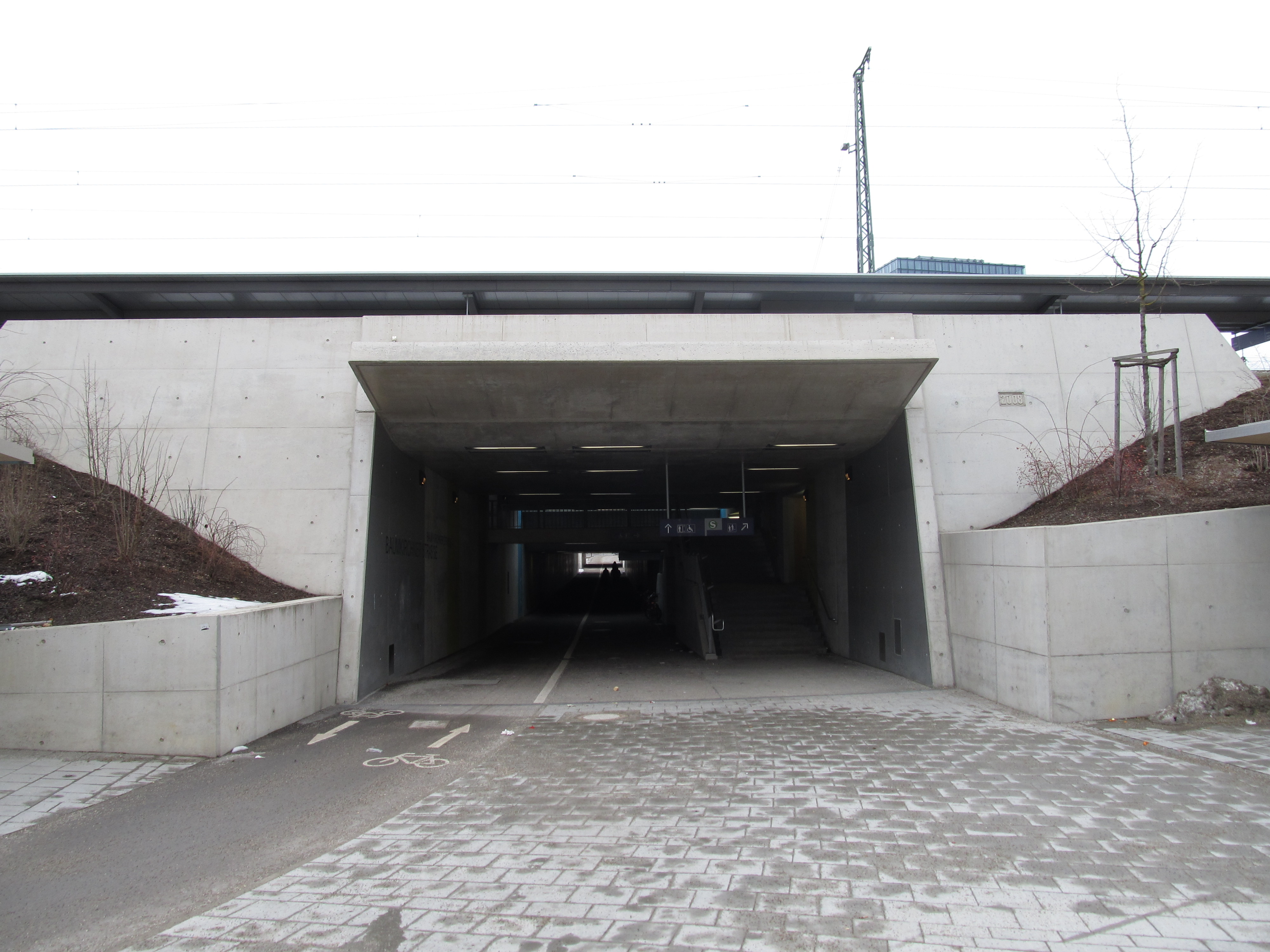
Underpass

Munich-Berg am Laim station is a stop on the Munich S-Bahn in the district of Berg am Laim in the Bavarian state capital of Munich. The station is served daily from about 300 services of the Munich S-Bahn each day and is classified by Deutsche Bahn as a category 4 station. It has two platforms tracks and lies on the Munich–Rosenheim railway and the Munich–Mühldorf railway.

== History ==
No station was opened at Berg am Laim when the Munich–Rosenheim railway opened on 15 October 1871. Berg am Laim was only opened as a halt (German: Haltepunkt) on 1 in May 1897, but only on the line to Rosenheim, which then ran parallel but south of the line to Mühldorf at this point. The station was, however, closed on 1 May 1915 because the line to Rosenheim was moved to the north so that it was next to the line to Mühldorf, but no new station was opened. A year later, on 1 May 1916, another Berg am Laim halt opened, this time only on the line to Mühldorf. On 1 October 1938, the station's name was changed from Berg am Laim to München-Berg am Laim. Until the introduction of the S-Bahn on Munich 28 May 1972, the station served only by trains on the Mühldorf line, but since the introduction of the S-Bahn it has been served by both lines. The platforms were made accessible for the disabled in 2008 with the provision of a separate underpass for the S-Bahn; previously travellers had to use the adjacent road tunnel to reach the platform.

== Infrastructure ==
The station has two platform tracks on an island platform, which has been equipped for disabled people since 2008. The platform is accessible via a pedestrian underpass and it has a platform canopy and digital platform displays. Berg am Laimer Bahnhof bus stop is served by bus routes 146 and 185 of the Münchner Verkehrsgesellschaft (Munich Transport Company, MVG). The station is located in the service area of the Münchner Verkehrs- und Tarifverbund (Munich Transport and Tariff Association, MVV).

=== Platform data ===
Platform lengths and heights are as follows:

- Track 1: length 211 m, height 96 cm
- Track 2: length 211 m, height 96 cm

== Rail services ==
The station is served at 20-minute intervals by S-Bahn lines 2, 4 and 6, with line S 6 only operating in the peak hour. In addition, S-Bahn line S 2 services run at 10-minute intervals during the peak hour.

== Sources ==
- Klaus-Dieter Korhammer; Armin Franzke; Ernst Rudolph (1991). Drehscheibe des Südens – Verkehrsknoten München (in German). Darmstadt: Hestra-Verlag. ISBN 3-7771-0236-9.
