= Munich-Untermenzing station =

Railway station in Germany

München Untermenzing
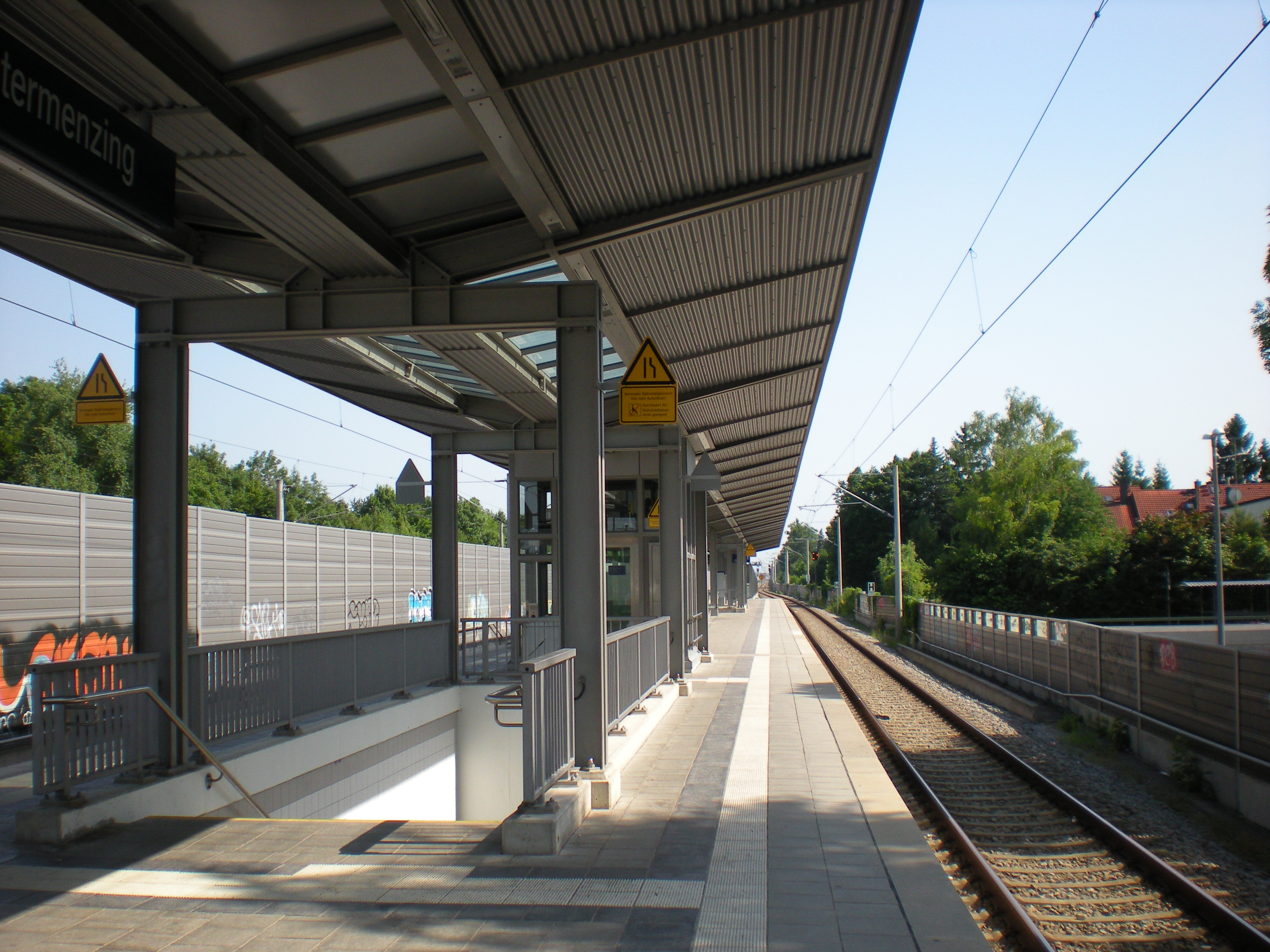

General information
- Location: Von-Kahr-Straße; 81827 München; Bavaria; Allach-Untermenzing; Germany
- Coordinates: 48°10′39.3″N 11°28′21.9″E
- Owner: DB Netz
- Operator: DB Station&Service
- Line: Munich–Treuchtlingen railway
- Platforms: 1
- Tracks: 2
- Train operators: S-Bahn München
- Connections: 162, 164, 165, N78, X80

Other information
- Station code: 2512
- DS100 code: MAUG
- IBNR: 8004139
- Category: 4
- Fare zone: : M and 1
- Website: www.bahnhof.de

History
- Opened: 11 December 2005; 20 years ago

Services
Preceding station	Munich S-Bahn	Following station
Allach towards Petershausen or Altomünster	S2	Obermenzing towards Erding
Location

Munich-Untermenzing station is a railway station in the Allach-Untermenzing borough of Munich, Germany.
