= Niederroth station =

Railway station in Germany

Niederroth
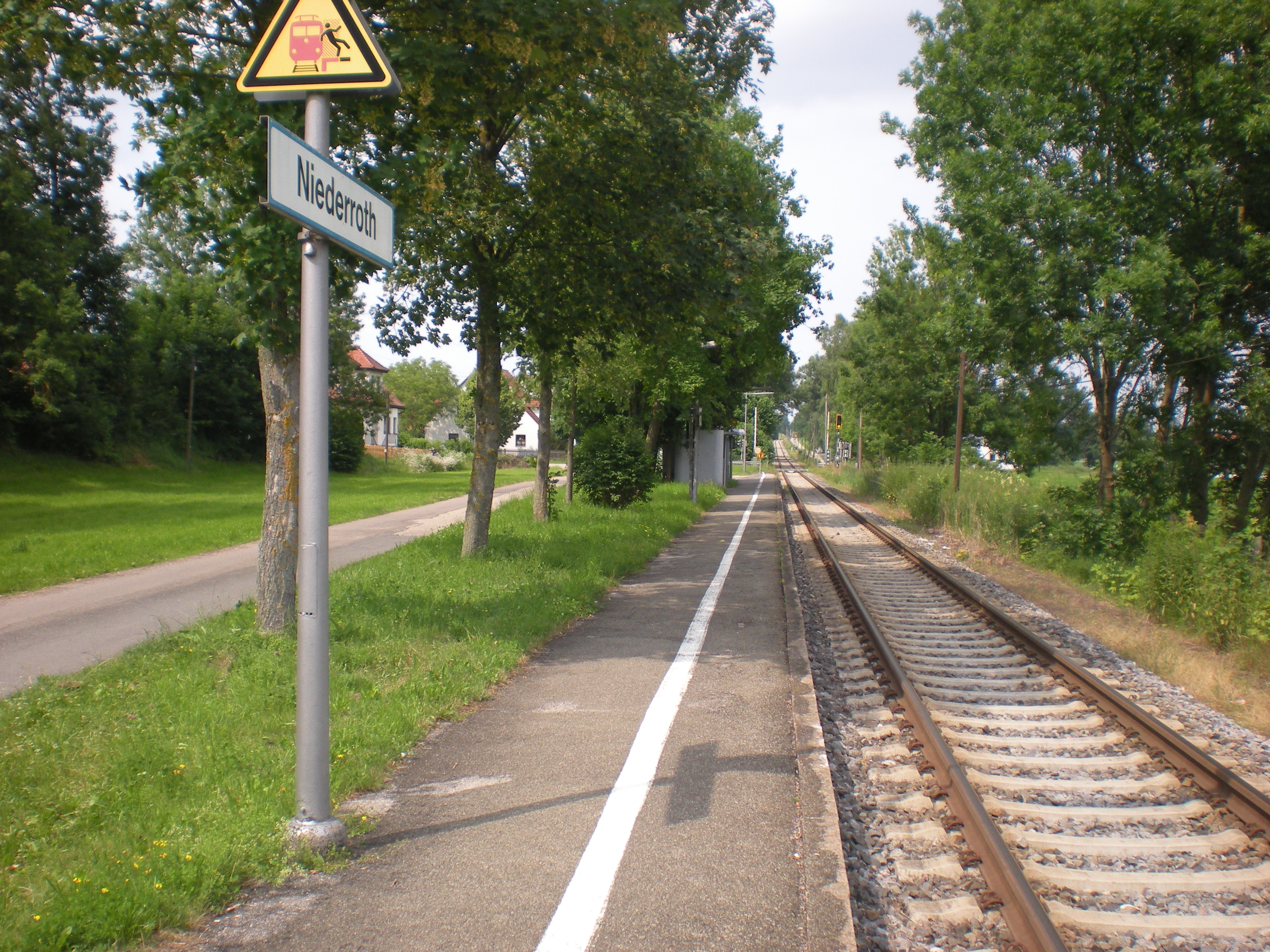
- 2013

General information
- Location: Gartenweg; 85229 Markt Indersdorf; Bavaria; Germany
- Coordinates: 48°19′16″N 11°23′25″E
- Owner: DB Netz
- Operator: DB Station&Service
- Lines: Dachau–Altomünster railway (KBS 999.2)
- Platforms: 1 side platform
- Tracks: 1
- Train operators: S-Bahn München
- Connections: 706, 708, 728

Other information
- Station code: 4518
- DS100 code: MNRO
- IBNR: 8004404
- Category: 7
- Fare zone: : 3
- Website: www.bahnhof.de

History
- Opened: 8 July 1912; 114 years ago

Services
Preceding station	Munich S-Bahn	Following station
Markt Indersdorf towards Altomünster	S2	Schwabhausen (bei Dachau) towards Erding
Location

Niederroth station is a railway station in the Niederroth district in the municipality of Markt Indersdorf, located in the district of Dachau in Upper Bavaria, Germany.
