= Markt Indersdorf station =

Railway station in Germany

Markt Indersdorf
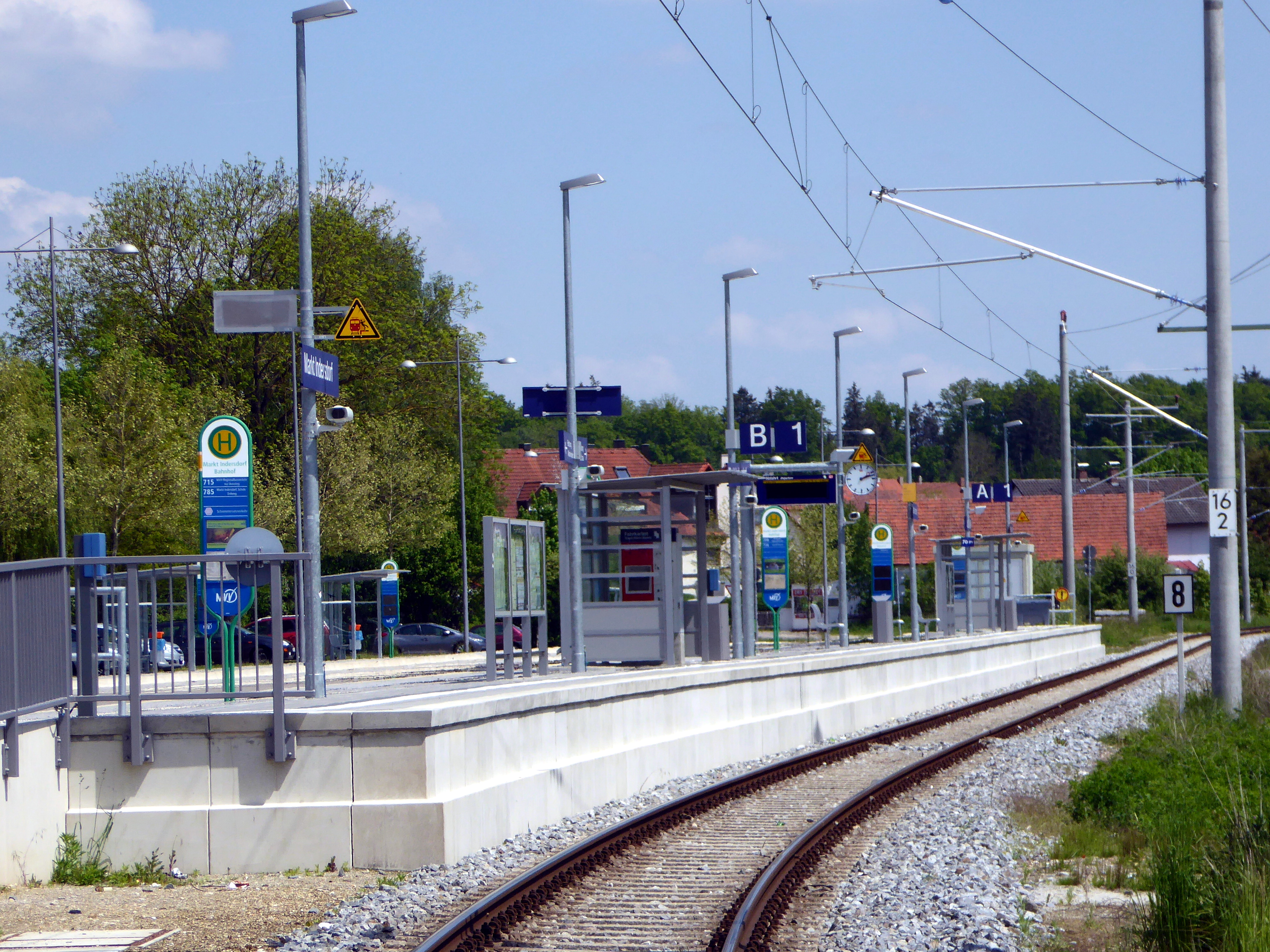
- 2016

General information
- Location: Am Bahnhof; 85229 Markt Indersdorf; Bavaria; Germany
- Coordinates: 48.3525°N 11.3793°E
- Elevation: 470 m (1,540 ft)
- System: Hp
- Owner: DB Netz
- Operator: DB Station&Service
- Lines: Dachau–Altomünster railway (KBS 999.2)
- Platforms: 1 side platform
- Tracks: 1
- Train operators: S-Bahn München
- Connections: 706, 708, 728, 729, 772, 782, 785, 791V, 7050, 7060, 7080

Other information
- Station code: 2988
- DS100 code: MIDR
- IBNR: 8003072
- Category: 6
- Fare zone: : 3 and 4
- Website: www.bahnhof.de

History
- Opened: 8 July 1912; 114 years ago

Services
Preceding station	Munich S-Bahn	Following station
Arnbach towards Altomünster	S2	Niederroth towards Erding
Location
- Location within Bavaria Location within Germany Location within Europe

Markt Indersdorf station is a railway station in the Karpfhofen district in the municipality of Markt Indersdorf, located in the district of Dachau in Upper Bavaria, Germany.
