= Dachau Stadt station =

Railway station in Germany

Dachau Stadt
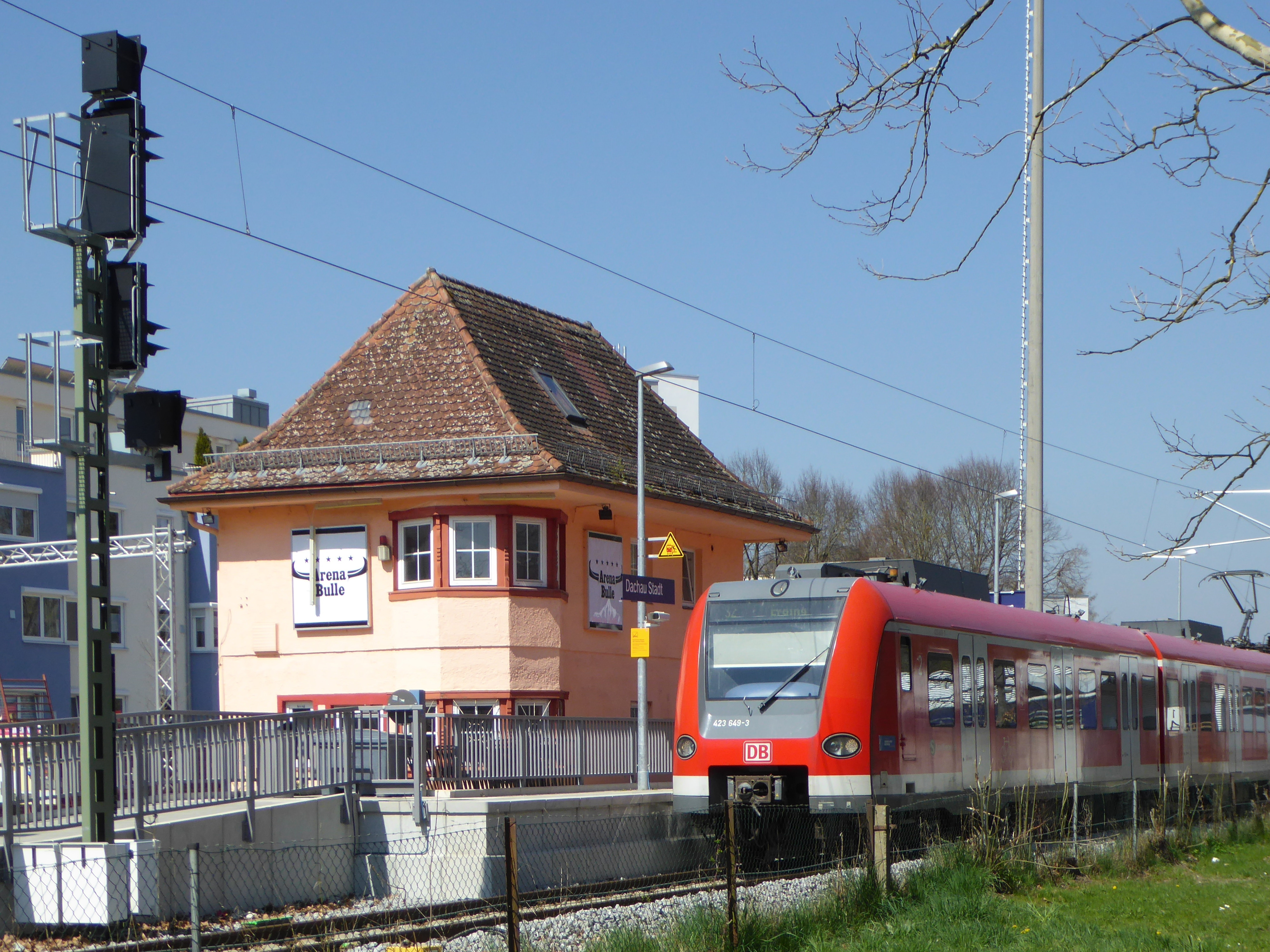
- 2016

General information
- Location: Etzenhausenerstraße; 85221 Dachau; Bavaria; Germany
- Coordinates: 48°15′37″N 11°26′03″E
- Owner: DB Netz
- Operator: DB Station&Service
- Lines: Dachau–Altomünster railway (KBS 999.2)
- Platforms: 1 side platform
- Tracks: 1
- Train operators: S-Bahn München
- Connections: 720, 722, 723, 725

Other information
- Station code: 1100
- DS100 code: MDAS
- IBNR: 8001355
- Category: 6
- Fare zone: : 1 and 2
- Website: www.bahnhof.de

History
- Opened: 8 July 1912; 114 years ago

Services
Preceding station	Munich S-Bahn	Following station
Bachern towards Altomünster	S2	Dachau Bahnhof towards Erding
Location
- Location within Bavaria Location within Germany Location within Europe

Dachau Stadt station is a railway station in the town of Dachau in Upper Bavaria, Germany.
