= Bachern station =

Railway station in Bergkirchen, Germany

Bachern

General information
- Location: Ludwig-Thoma-Straße; 85232 Bergkirchen; Bavaria; Germany
- Coordinates: 48.2789°N 11.3820°E
- Owner: DB Netz
- Operator: DB Station&Service
- Lines: Dachau–Altomünster railway (KBS 999.2)
- Platforms: 1 side platform
- Tracks: 1
- Train operators: S-Bahn München
- Connections: 791, 7000, 7100, X730

Other information
- Station code: 241
- DS100 code: MBCN
- IBNR: 8000685
- Category: 7
- Fare zone: : 2
- Website: www.bahnhof.de

History
- Opened: 8 July 1912; 114 years ago

Services
Preceding station	Munich S-Bahn	Following station
Schwabhausen (bei Dachau) towards Altomünster	S2	Dachau Stadt towards Erding
Location
- Location within Bavaria Location within Germany Location within Europe

Bachern station is a railway station in the Bachern district in the municipality of Bergkirchen, located in the Dachau district in Upper Bavaria, Germany.
