= Munich-Riem station =

Munich S-Bahn station

München Riem Pbf
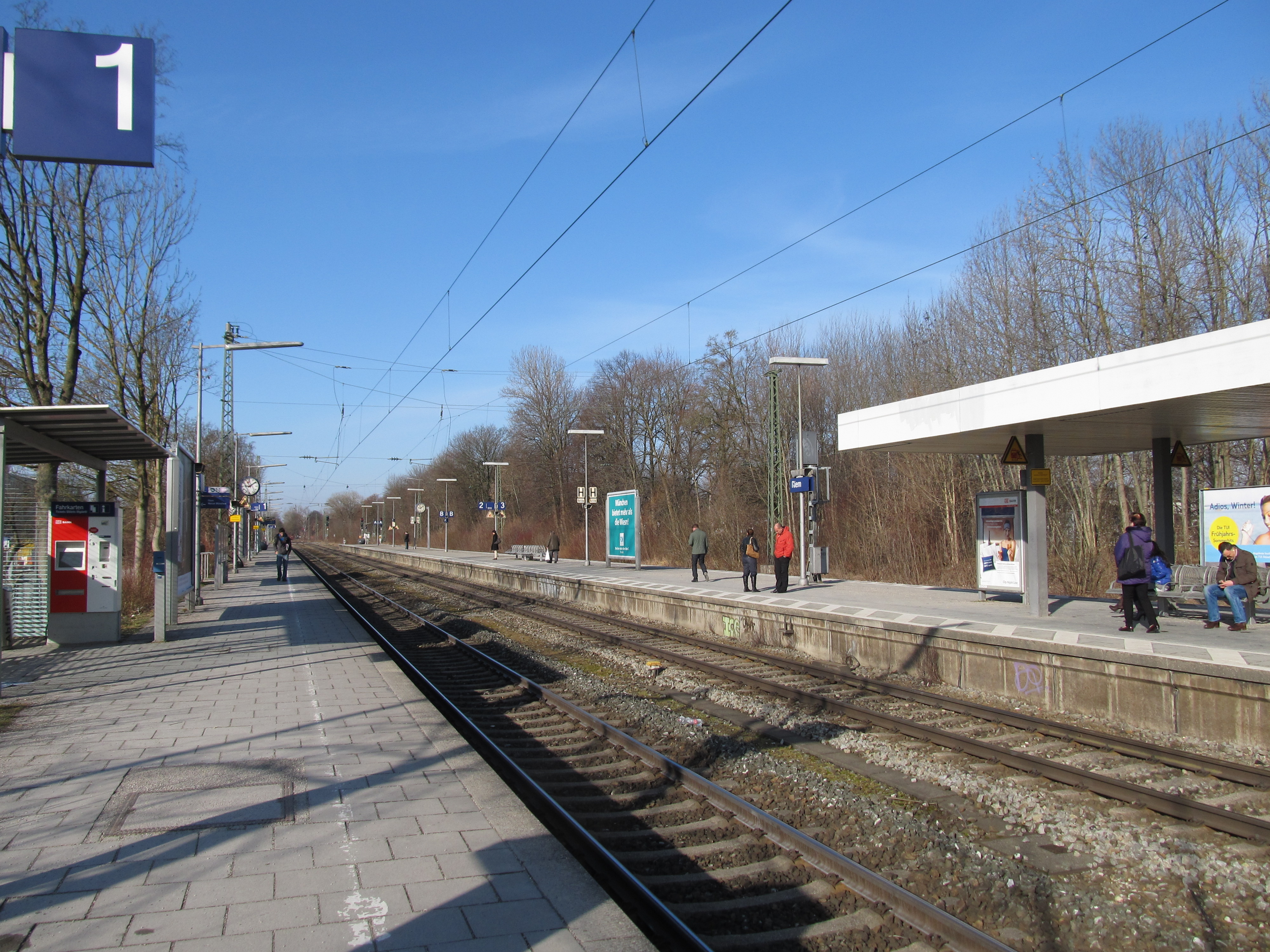

General information
- Location: Trudering-Riem, Bavaria; Germany
- Coordinates: 48°8′39″N 11°40′43″E
- Lines: Munich–Mühldorf (KBS 940 / 999.2)
- Platforms: 3
- Train operators: Munich S-Bahn
- Connections: 190, 194, 263, 264

Construction
- Accessible: Yes

Other information
- Station code: 4268
- DS100 code: MRI
- IBNR: 8004160
- Category: 4
- Fare zone: : M and 1
- Website: stationsdatenbank.de; www.bahnhof.de

History
- Opened: 1 May 1897

Services
Preceding station	Munich S-Bahn	Following station
Berg am Laim towards Petershausen or Altomünster	S2	Feldkirchen (b München) towards Erding
Location

Munich-Riem station is an S-Bahn station and container terminal in the east of Munich in the district of Trudering-Riem on the Munich–Mühldorf railway in the German state of Bavaria. The station is served by the Munich S-Bahn and is classified by Deutsche Bahn as a category 4 station.

== History ==
Riem station was established on 1 May 1871 with opening of the railway to Mühldorf. On 1 October 1938, it was renamed to Munich-Riem. Since 28 May 1972 passenger services to the station have only been operated by S-Bahn trains.

=== Infrastructure ===
Currently, it is served by S-Bahn line S 2 (Erding–Petershausen). On the southern side of the station it is possible to transfer to bus routes 190 and 194 of the Münchner Verkehrsgesellschaft (Munich Transport Company, MVG). On the northern side, in the Dornach district, there is a bus stop served by MVV bus routes 263 and 264. It does not have disabled access.

The station has a 210-meter-long (690 ft) central platform and a 219 m-long (719 ft) side platform. The platform edges are 76 cm (30 in) high.

Apart from the Riem town centre, the Galopprennbahn Riem (horse race course), the Reitstadion Riem (riding stadium) and the industrial area of Ascheim-Dornach are within a few minutes walking distance.

Riem was the nearest station to the former Munich-Riem Airport.

As part of the Erding Ring Closure (Erdinger Ringschluss) there would be a connection to the Munich Trade Fair (Messe München) ground east of the station and a new station would be built there.

=== Container terminal ===
The Deutsche Umschlaggesellschaft Schiene-Straße (German rail-road transshipment company) opened a container terminal about a kilometre away to the east of the station and south of the main line in 1992. This consists of three sets of tracks with the latest gantry cranes spanning five 700 m-long (2,300 ft) tracks. The capacity of this plant is 250,000 TEUs. The third sets of tracks was opened in 2012. The reconstruction costs were €16 million, producing an increase in throughput from 350,000 to 400,000 TEUs.
