= Dachau Bahnhof =

Railway station in Germany

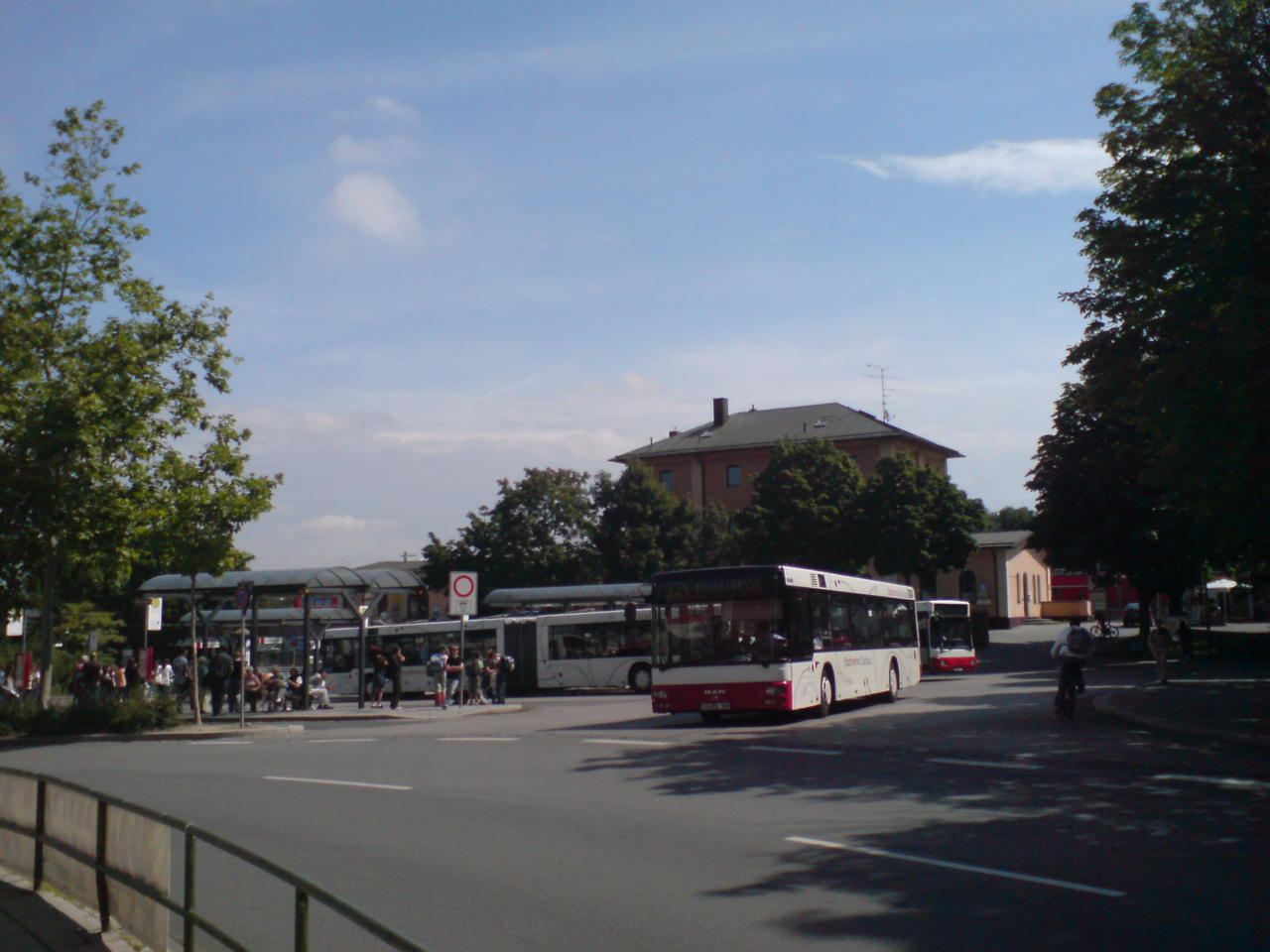

General information
- Location: Dachau, Bavaria; Germany
- Coordinates: 48°15′17″N 11°26′40″E
- Owner: Deutsche Bahn
- Operator: DB Netz; DB Station&Service
- Lines: Munich–Treuchtlingen; Dachau–Altomünster
- Platforms: 5
- Train operators: S-Bahn München, DB Regio Bayern
- Connections: 172, 291, 702, 704, 705, 706, 710, 716, 717, 718, 719, 720, 721, 722, 723, 725, 726, 736, 744, 791, 7000, 7100, X201, X800

Construction
- Accessible: Yes

Other information
- Station code: 1099
- DS100 code: MDA
- IBNR: 8001354
- Category: 3
- Fare zone: : 1 and 2
- Website: Stationsdatenbank Bayern; www.bahnhof.de

History
- Opened: 14 November 1867; 158 years ago
- Electrified: 1 June 1934; 92 years ago

Services
| Preceding station | DB Regio Bayern | Following station |
|---|---|---|
| Petershausen towards Nürnberg Hbf | RB 16 | München Hbf Terminus |
| Preceding station | Munich S-Bahn | Following station |
| Hebertshausen towards Petershausen | S2 | Munich-Karlsfeld towards Erding |
| Dachau Stadt towards Altomünster | S2 | Munich-Karlsfeld towards Erding |
Location
- Location within Bavaria Location within Germany Location within Europe

Dachau station (German: Dachau Bahnhof) is a station in the Bavarian town of Dachau on the Munich S-Bahn network. It is classified by Deutsche Bahn as a category 3 station and it has five platform tracks. It is served daily by about 190 trains operated by Deutsche Bahn, including 150 S-Bahn trains. Dachau station is on the Munich–Treuchtlingen railway and is the beginning of the Dachau–Altomünster railway.

Dachau Stadt (town) station is on the Dachau–Altomünster Railway.

== Location ==
Dachau station is located southeast of the town of Dachau. The station building is located to the west of the tracks and has the address of Bahnhofplatz 1. Frühlingstraße runs to the west of the station, while Langhammerstraße runs west from the Bahnhofplatz (station forecourt). To the east of the tracks is Obere Moosschwaigestraße where there is a park-and-ride area. Schleißheimer Straße passes under the tracks to the north of the station. Augustenfelder Straße runs through an underpass to the south of the station. There is a bus station in the station forecourt.

== History ==
Dachau station was opened on 14 November 1867, together with the Munich–Treuchtlingen railway. Facilities available by then included a turntable, a level junction, a goods shed (equipped with a loading track), an entrance building and a watering point. In the following years, the railway received continuous upgrades. Additional tracks were built around Dachau station in 1884, and the station building was upgraded twice, in 1887 and 1895.

The branch from Dachau to Markt Indersdorf, which is also known as the Ludwig-Thoma-Bahn (after the author Ludwig Thoma), was opened on 8 July 1912. This branch line was extended to Altomünster on 18 December 1913, and a new station closer to Dachau town center opened on the branch. To distinguish between the two stations, Dachau station was renamed (in German) from Bahnhof Dachau to Dachau Bahnhof. This change indicates that Dachau station is the main line station serving the town, but not in it.

The main line from Munich to Dachau was electrified in 1939, but further electrification to Ingolstadt was delayed by the outbreak of World War II and was not completed until 1960. In 1972, Dachau station was rebuilt again with two new platforms, in preparation for S-Bahn operations, which commenced on 28 May 1972. The S-Bahn line, numbered S2, operates between Petershausen and Munich, with Dachau being an important intermediate station.

General freight operations ended in 1976 and the handling of all other freight was abandoned in 1980. In 1998, the station and forecourt were significantly restructured.

The Dachau–Altomünster railway was integrated into Munich S-Bahn in 1995. At that time, diesel railcars were used, and the railway operated under a separate entity called "Line A". Its electrification was delayed several times, but was eventually finished in 2014. Since then, some S2 services have been diverted onto the Altomünster branch.

=== Conversion for the Nuremberg–Ingolstadt–Munich high-speed line ===
In the spring of 2000, construction began on the upgraded line (Ausbaustrecke) between Ingolstadt and Munich as part of the Nuremberg–Ingolstadt–Munich high-speed line. The Petershausen–Munich line was upgraded for operations at 200 km/h and new tracks are laid for the S-Bahn. On 21 April 2003, the upgrade of the Petershausen–Dachau section was completed, including a third track for line S 2. On 11 December 2005, the upgrade of the Dachau–München-Obermenzing section was completed and the two additional tracks for the S-Bahn were opened, which made possible the operation of S-Bahn services between Munich and Dachau at 10-minute intervals. Dachau station was fundamentally redesigned and received new platforms and improved accessibility.

== Infrastructure ==
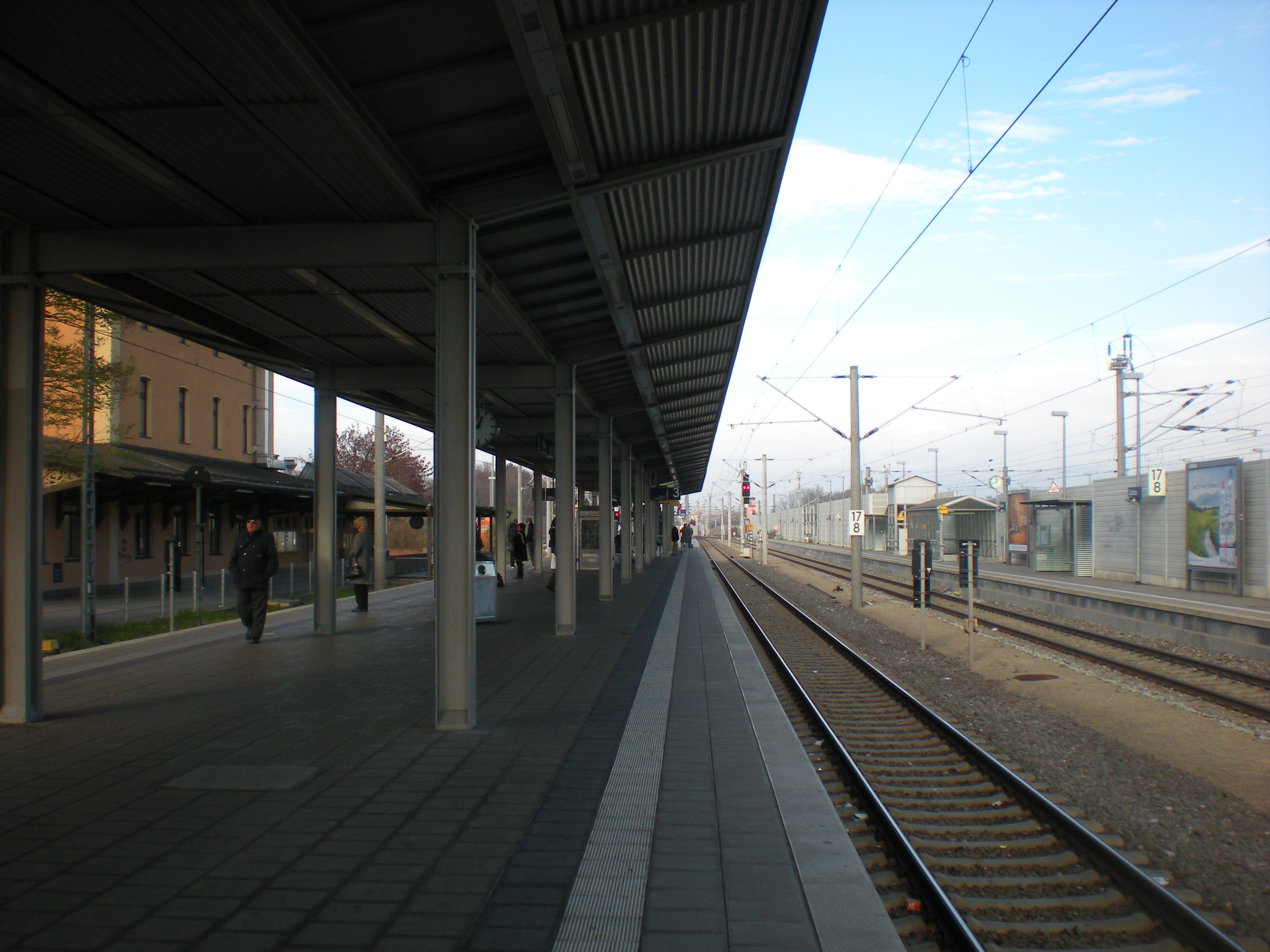
S-Bahn platforms

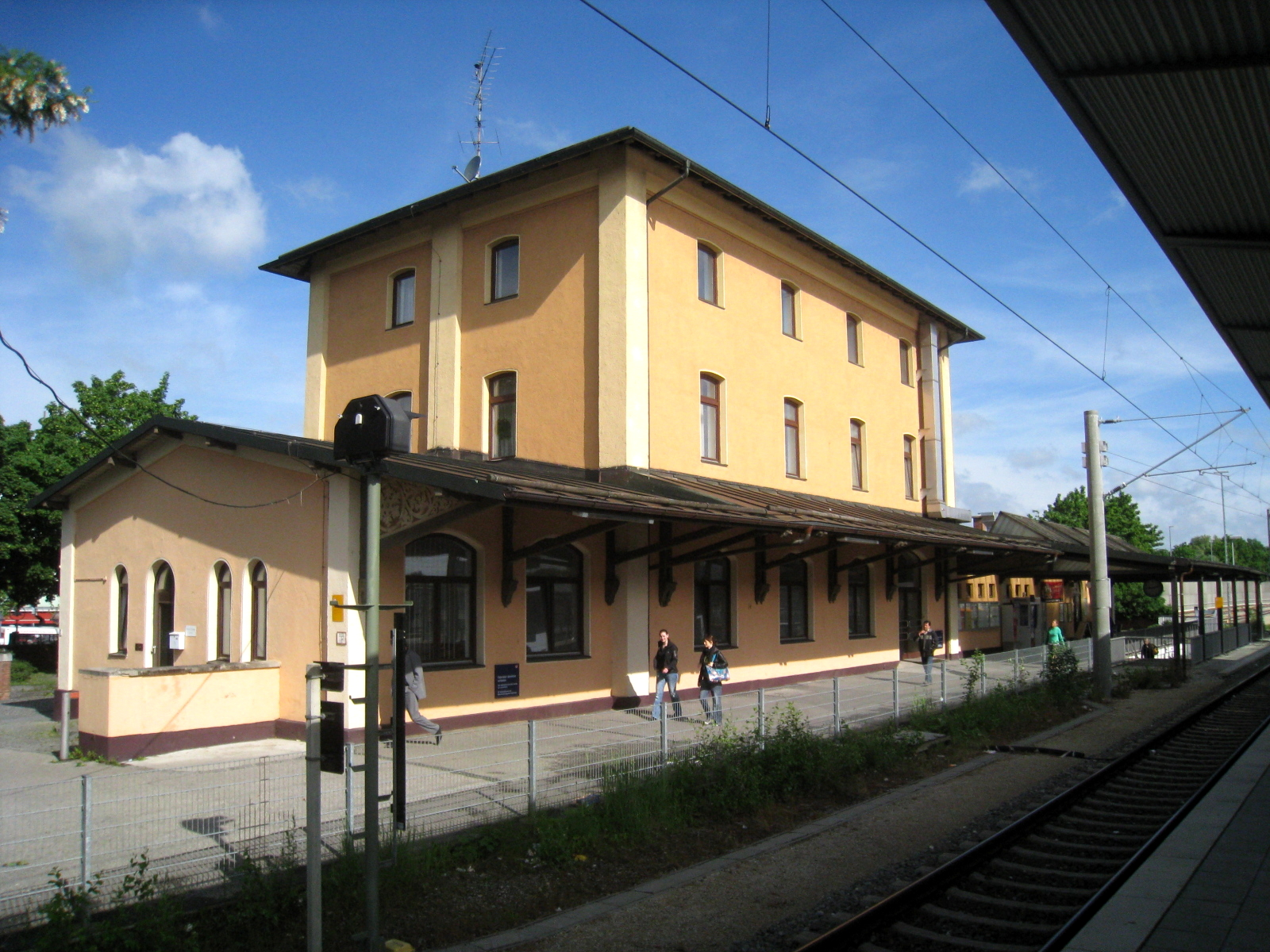
Track side of the station building

Dachau station has five platform tracks on three platforms, with platform tracks 1 and 3 and the bay platform 2 located on the same island platform. Track 1 is served by the S-Bahn towards Munich, track 2 by the S-Bahn to Altomünster and track 3 by the S-Bahn towards Petershausen. Track 4, which is a single-sided platform, is served by regional services towards Munich and in the peak hour by single S-Bahn services to Altomünster or Munich. Tracks 5 and 6, which have no platforms, are separated from platform 4 by a noise barrier and are used by non-stopping trains on the high-speed line. Track 7 is also located on a side platform and is served by regional trains towards Ingolstadt. Another noise barrier separates this side platform from Obere Moosschwaigestraße. The S-Bahn platform is roofed and has digital destination displays, while the two side platforms have no platform canopies or platform displays. The platforms are connected by a tunnel to the station building and are equipped with lifts, making them accessible for the disabled. The station is located in the area of the Münchner Verkehrs- und Tarifverbund Munich Transport and Tariff Association, MVV).

The signals and switches at the station are controlled by a Siemens class 60 (SP Dr S60) track plan push button interlocking.

The entrance building houses a ticket office and a McDonald's restaurant.

=== Platform data ===
Platform lengths and heights are as follows:

- Track 1: length 360 m, height 96 cm
- Track 3: length 240 m, height 96 cm
- Track 4: length 250 m, height 96 cm
- Track 7: length 360 m, height 96 cm

== Operations ==
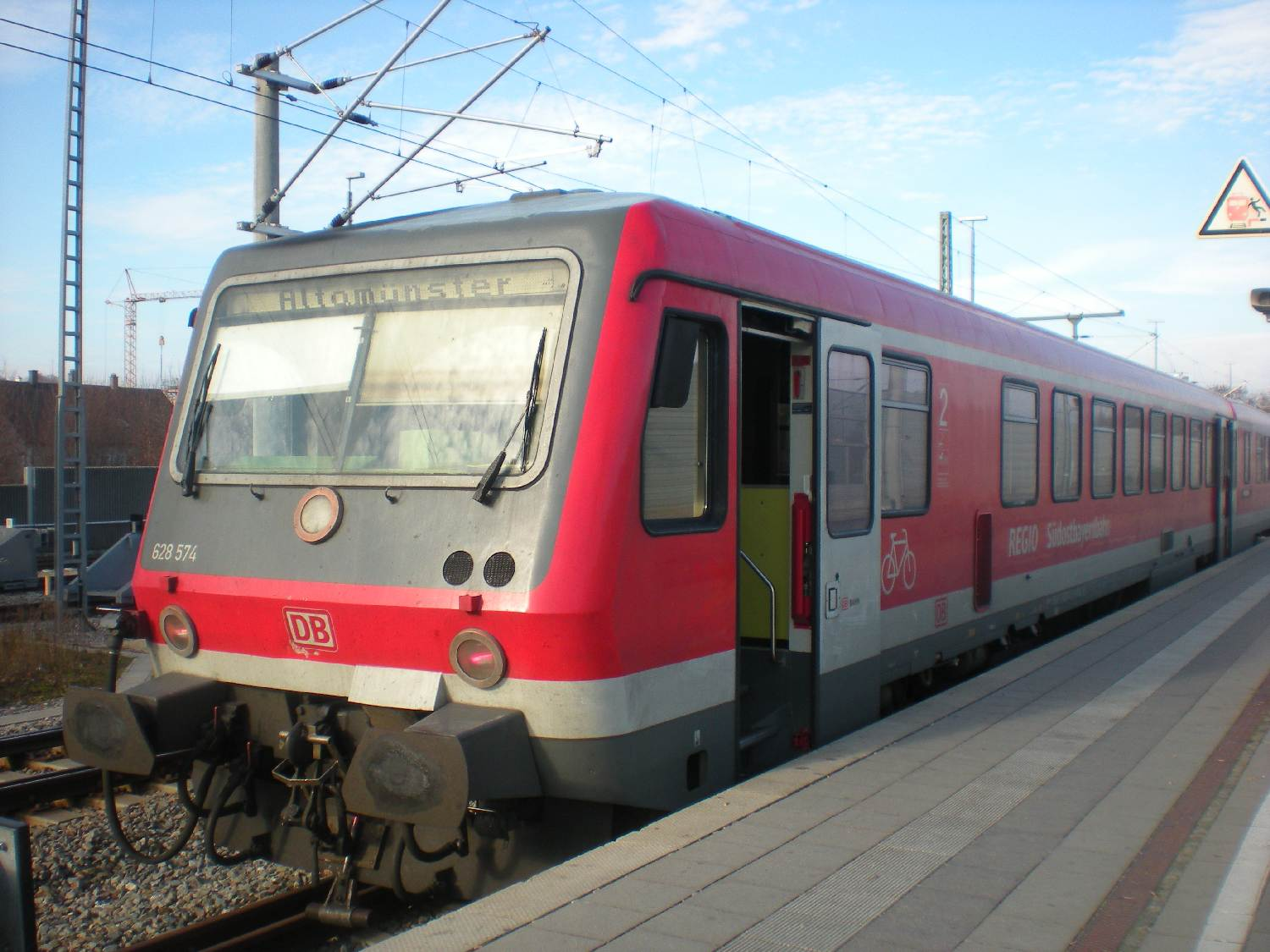
DB Class 628 on a S-Bahn Line A service to Altomünster, prior to electrification of the branch

=== Regionalbahn ===
The station is served by the Munich–Treuchtlingen–Nuremberg Regionalbahn service, with an hourly service between Munich and Treuchtlingen. Every second train run further to Nuremberg. In addition, there are single Regionalbahn services operated in the peak hours between Munich and Ingolstadt. These services are operated with double-deck push–pull trains propelled by class 111 locomotives.

| Line/ train class | Route | Frequency |
|---|---|---|
| RB 16 | Munich – Dachau – Ingolstadt – Eichstätt – Treuchtlingen (– Nuremberg) | Hourly |
| RB 16 | Munich – Dachau – Ingolstadt | Single services |

=== Munich S-Bahn ===
Dachau station is served by Munich S-Bahn line S2, which runs between Petershausen or Altomünster to Erding, operated using Class 423 electric multiple units. In peak hours, extra S-Bahn services run between Dachau and Altomünster using a class 420 electric multiple unit, increasing the frequency between Dachau and Altomünster to every 30 minutes.

S-Bahn services towards Munich town centre run every 20 minutes, while the S-Bahn trains to Petershausen are either 20 or 40 minutes apart from each other.

Before electrification, the route to Altomünster was operated by diesel multiple units and designated as Line A.

=== Trains passing through Dachau non-stop ===
Every two hours the München-Nürnberg-Express passes through the station without stopping. In addition, all Intercity-Express trains on the Nuremberg–Ingolstadt–Munich high-speed line run through the station without stopping.

=== Bus links ===
The bus station at Dachau station has five platforms. It is served by MVV routes operated by Dachau city transport (716–720, 722, 726 and 744) and district transport (172, 291, 702–706, 710, 721, 725, 736 and 791).
