= Ottenhofen =

- Municipality
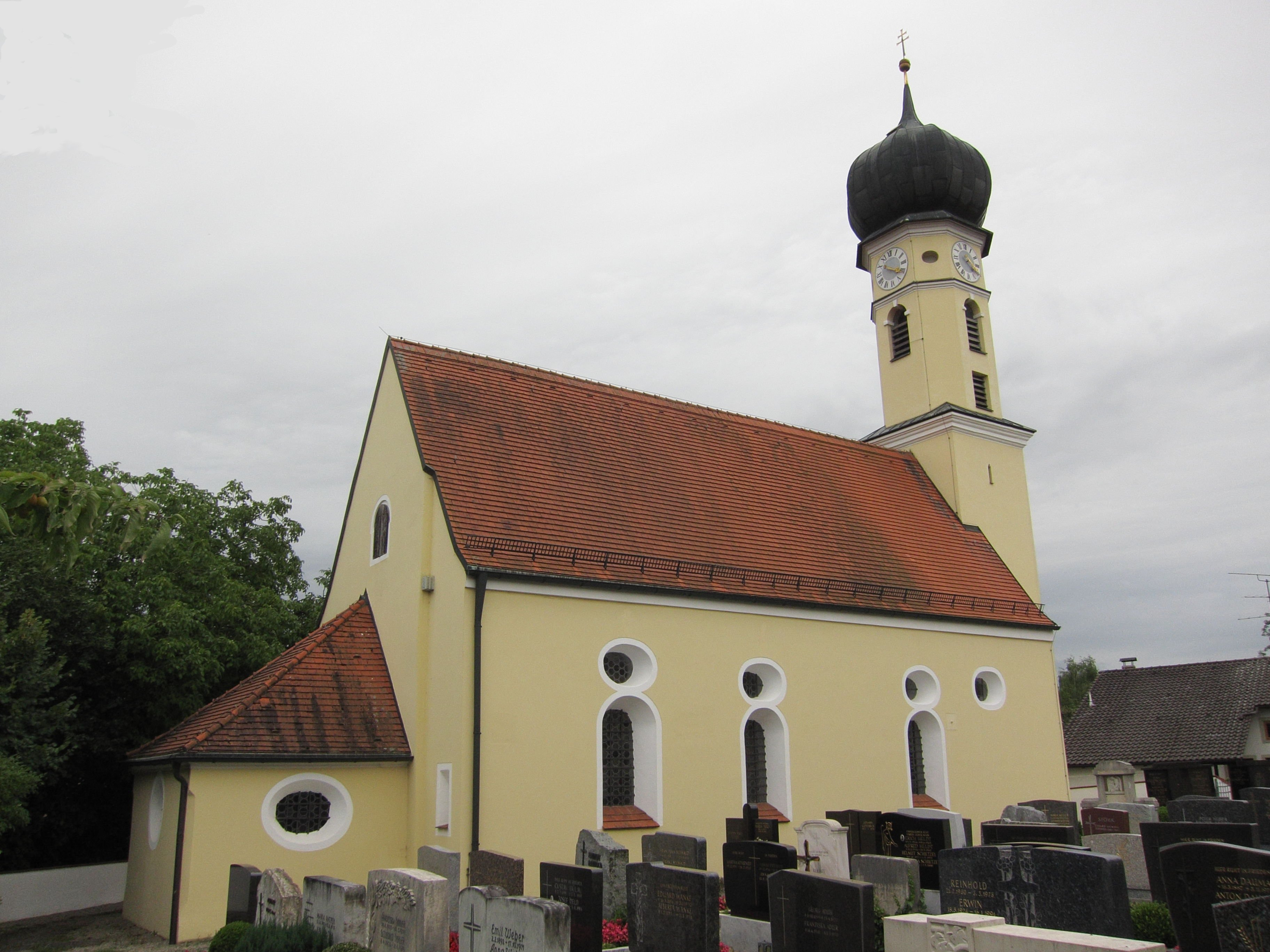
- Church of Saint Catherine

- Coat of arms

- Location of Ottenhofen within Erding district
- Interactive map of Ottenhofen
- Location within Germany Location within Bavaria
- Coordinates: 48°13′N 11°53′E
- Country: Germany
- State: Bavaria
- Admin. region: Oberbayern
- District: Erding
- Municipal assoc.: Oberneuching

Government
  - Mayor (2020–26): Nicole Schley (SPD)

Area
  - Total: 10.27 km^{2} (3.97 sq mi)
- Elevation: 498 m (1,634 ft)

Population (2025-12-31)
  - Total: 1,970
  - Density: 192/km^{2} (497/sq mi)
- Time zone: UTC+01:00 (CET)
  - Summer (DST): UTC+02:00 (CEST)
- Postal codes: 85570
- Dialling codes: 08121
- Vehicle registration: ED
- Website: www.ottenhofen.de

Ottenhofen (German pronunciation: [ɔtn̩ˈhoːfn̩]) is a municipality in the district of Erding in Bavaria in Germany.
