= Schwabhausen =

- Municipality
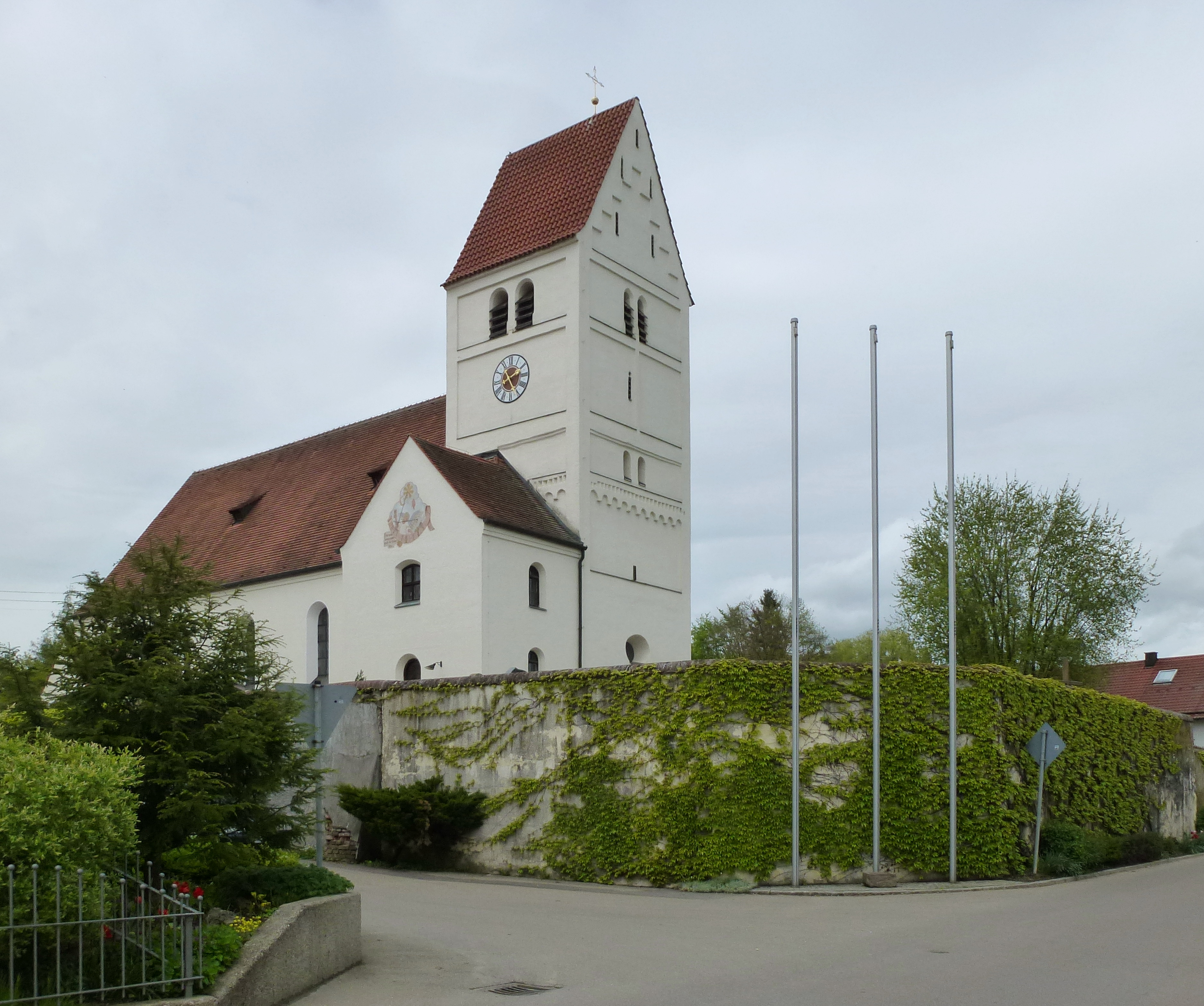
- Church of Saint Michael

- Coat of arms

- Location of Schwabhausen within Dachau district
- Interactive map of Schwabhausen
- Location within Germany Location within Bavaria
- Coordinates: 48°17′N 11°20′E
- Country: Germany
- State: Bavaria
- Admin. region: Oberbayern
- District: Dachau
- Subdivisions: 16 Ortsteile

Government
  - Mayor (2020–26): Wolfgang Hörl (FW)

Area
  - Total: 30.23 km^{2} (11.67 sq mi)
- Elevation: 493 m (1,617 ft)

Population (2025-12-31)
  - Total: 6,264
  - Density: 207.2/km^{2} (536.7/sq mi)
- Time zone: UTC+01:00 (CET)
  - Summer (DST): UTC+02:00 (CEST)
- Postal codes: 85247
- Dialling codes: 08138
- Vehicle registration: DAH
- Website: www.schwabhausen.de

Schwabhausen is a municipality in the district of Dachau in Bavaria in Germany.
