= Erdweg =

- Municipality
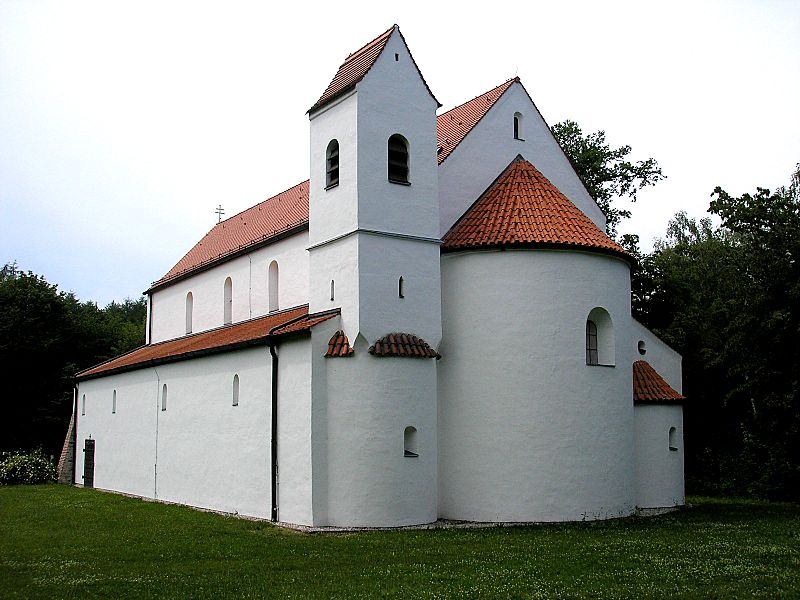
- Basilica of St Peter and St Paul in Petersberg district of Erdweg

- Coat of arms

- Location of Erdweg within Dachau district
- Interactive map of Erdweg
- Location within Germany Location within Bavaria
- Coordinates: 48°19′N 11°18′E
- Country: Germany
- State: Bavaria
- Admin. region: Oberbayern
- District: Dachau
- Subdivisions: 18 Ortsteile

Government
  - Mayor (2023–29): Christian Blatt (CSU)

Area
  - Total: 36.03 km^{2} (13.91 sq mi)
- Elevation: 500 m (1,600 ft)

Population (2025-12-31)
  - Total: 6,214
  - Density: 172.5/km^{2} (446.7/sq mi)
- Time zone: UTC+01:00 (CET)
  - Summer (DST): UTC+02:00 (CEST)
- Postal codes: 85253
- Dialling codes: 08138
- Vehicle registration: DAH
- Website: www.erdweg.de

Erdweg is a municipality in the district of Dachau in Bavaria in Germany.
