= Dachau–Altomünster railway =

Railway line in Germany

Dachau–Altomünster
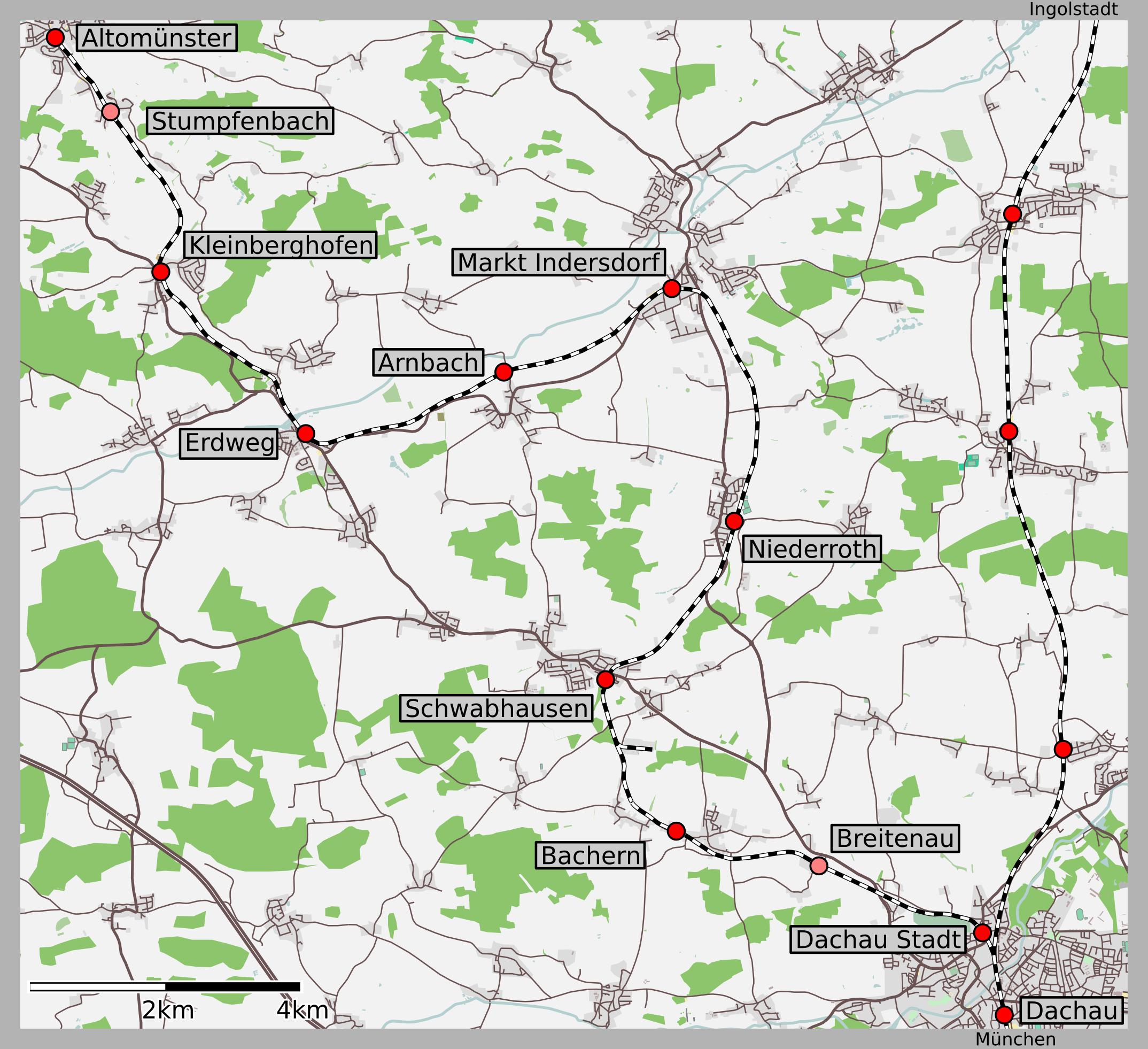

Overview
- Line number: 5502
- Locale: Bavaria

Service
- Route number: 999.2 999.30 (until 2014)

Technical
- Line length: 29.9 km (18.6 mi)
- Track gauge: 1,435 mm (4 ft 8 1/2 in) standard gauge
- Electrification: 15 kV/16.7 Hz AC overhead catenary

The Dachau–Altomünster railway, also called the Bummerl, Bockerl or Ludwig Thoma Railway, is a railway in the German state of Bavaria. It is part of the Munich S-Bahn network and is integrated within the Münchner Verkehrs- und Tarifverbund (Munich Transport and Tariff Association, MVV) as line S2. The branch line connects the town of Dachau on the Munich–Treuchtlingen railway with Altomünster. Markt Indersdorf is an important stop. Until its electrification in 2014, it was the only non-electrified line of the Munich S-Bahn and was designated as line A.

== History ==
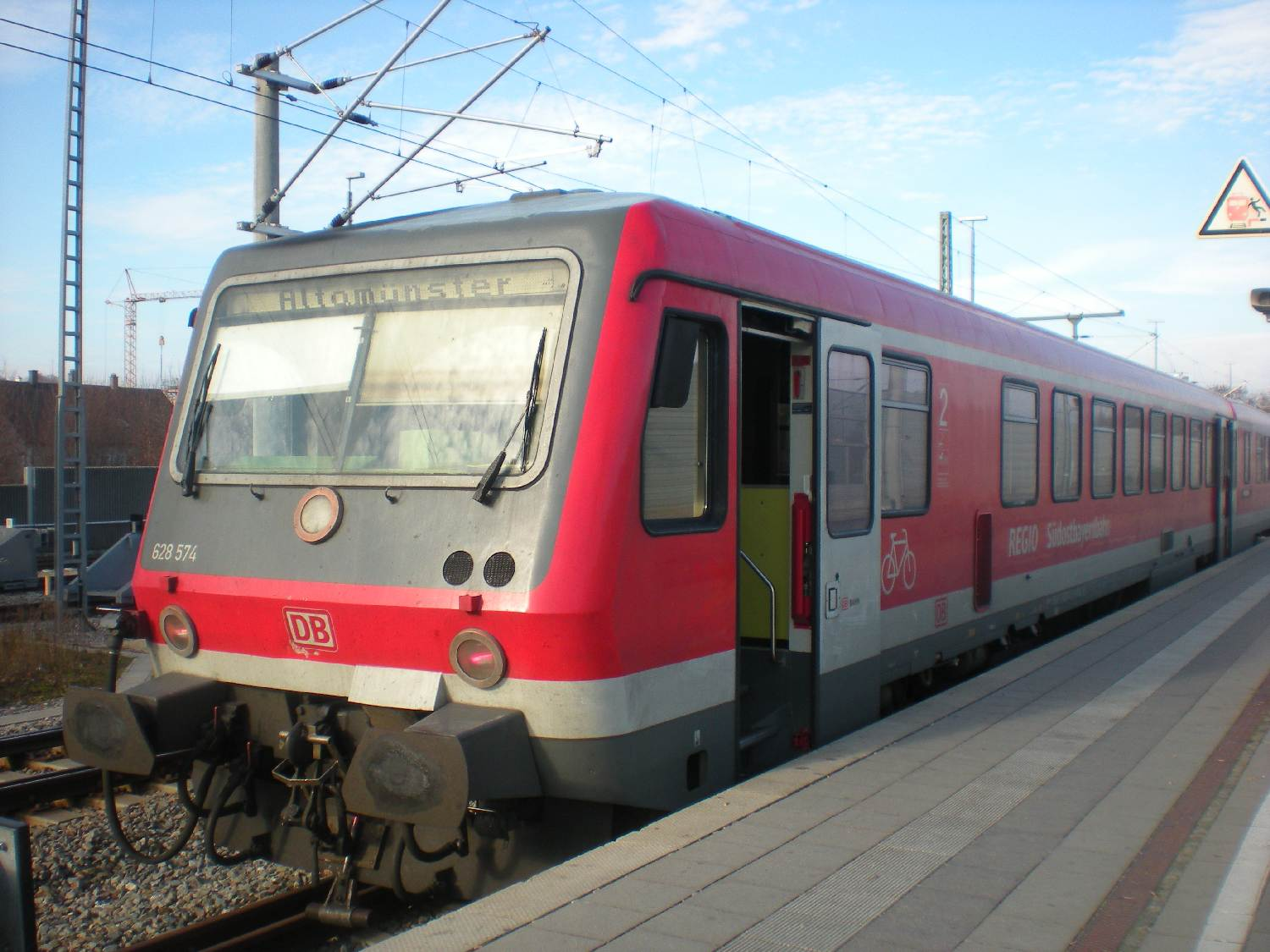
S-Bahn line A with class 628 train to Altomünster

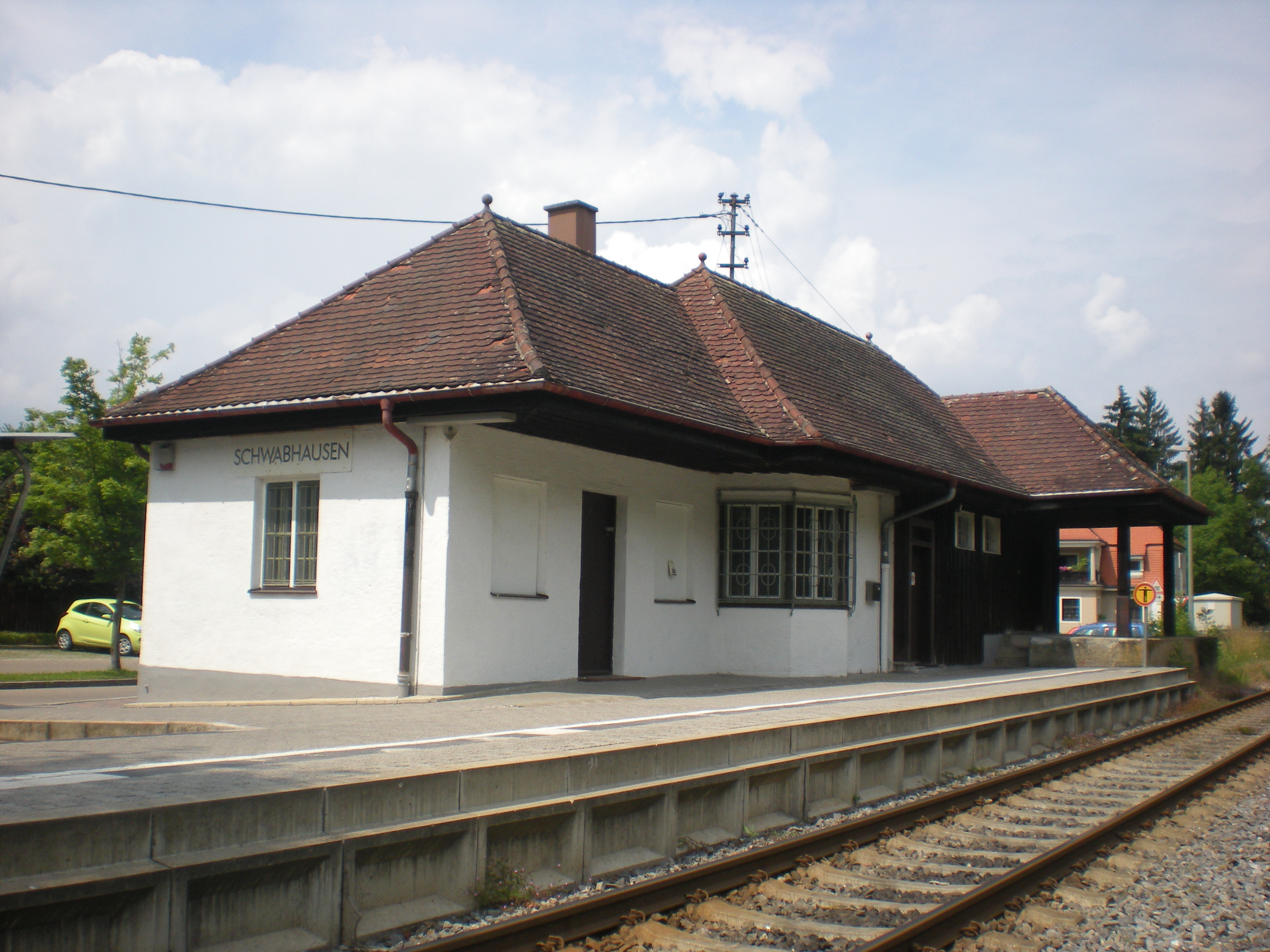
Schwabhausen (b Dachau) station building 2013

At the beginning of the year 1900 it was decided to build a railway line from the Munich–Ingolstadt line (now part of the Nuremberg–Munich high-speed line) for the development of the hinterland of Dachau. There were two option for the route: connecting Altomünster via Schwabhausen and Erdweg from Dachau station or connecting Markt Indersdorf from Hebertshausen.

The respective municipalities could not agree on one or other the routes and so came to a compromise. This compromise is reflected in the present route. First it runs west to Schwabhausen, then continues north to Indersdorf and turns back to the southwest to run up the Glonn valley to Erdweg. From there, the line heads back to the northwest to Altomünster. This means that the line takes 29.9 kilometres between Dachau and Altomünster, which are about 20 kilometres apart in a direct line.

The first section from Dachau to Indersdorf was opened on 8 July 1912 and the whole line to Altomünster was commissioned as the "Dachauer Lokalbahn" on 18 December 1913.

At the time of the Bavarian Soviet Republic, the local railway was an important economic factor for the revolutionary government. The money printed in the paper mill in Dachau could be transported directly to Munich without substantial detours.

Since the establishment of the MVV, the whole line has been integrated in the MVV's system of fares. It was formerly served by local trains, operated with push–pull trains trains made up of yl and Silberling carriage, hauled by locomotives of class 211 and later 212. In 1995, the still non-electrified railway was included as line A of the Munich S-Bahn.

In the 2000s, planning began for the electrification of the suburban railway line. The estimated cost in 2005 was €32 million. The planning agreement for electrification was signed at the end of June 2006. Originally, the construction was to begin in 2012, with completion scheduled for 2013, but the work was repeatedly postponed. Final planning approval was issued in January 2013. In mid-November 2013, the contract for the electrification of the line was estimated to be worth €8 million. As part of the European tender five bids were received. The final cost estimate was €47 million.

From April 28 to 13 December 2014, the line was completely closed for the construction work. The S-Bahn line was continuously electrified and a passing loop was installed between Bachem and Schwabhausen. A crossing loop was installed at Erdweg station and the existing crossing loop at Markt Indersdorf station was removed. This made services at 30-minute intervals possible. There were delays in the construction and the railway could not be opened for operations as planned on 17 November, but services resumed at the timetable change on 14 December 2014.

== Operations ==
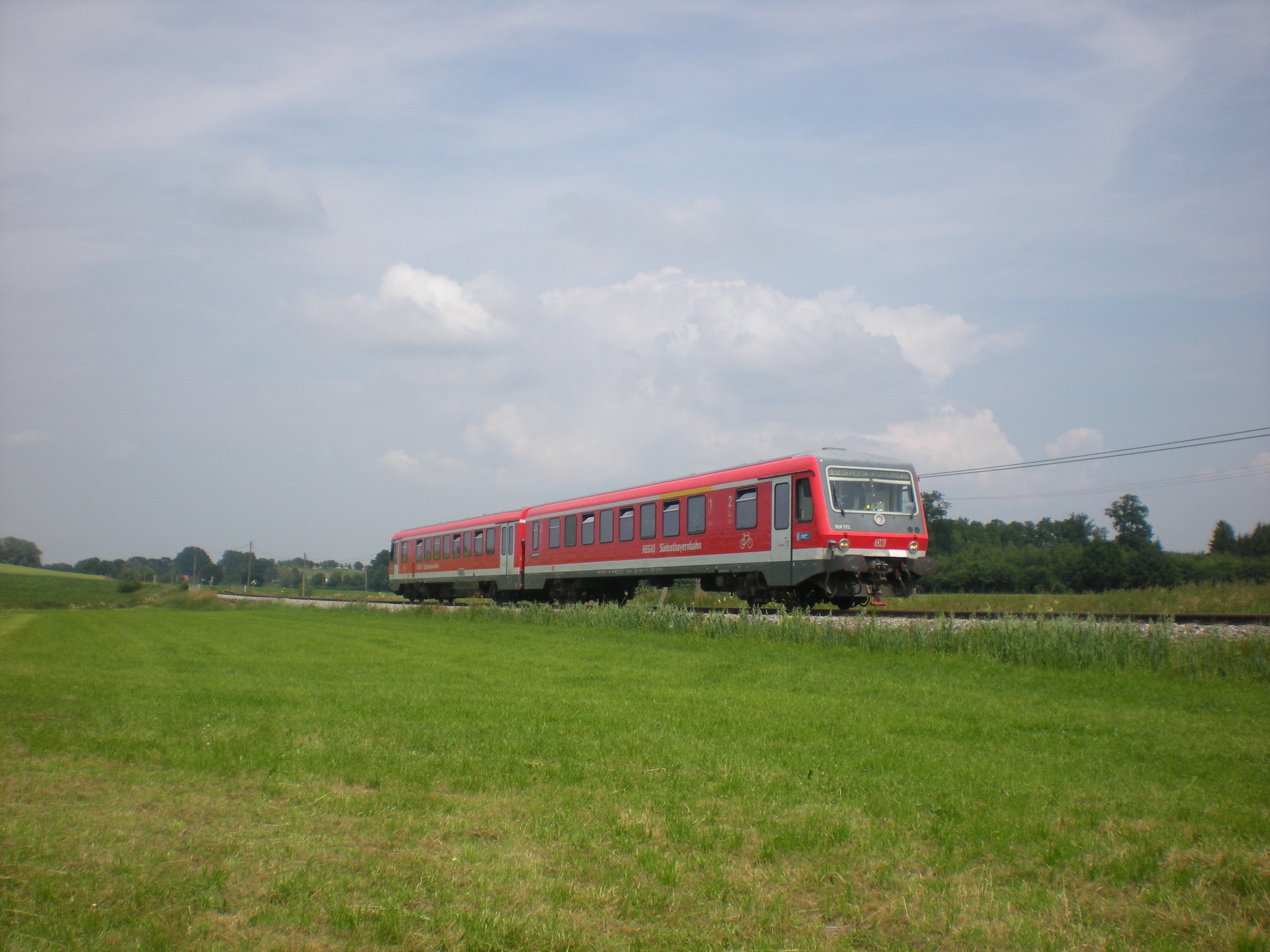
Class 628 DMU of line A near Schwabhausen

Until April 2014, services on line A ran hourly from Dachau to Altomünster. In the peak hour a service ran through to Munich Central Station (Hauptbahnhof). The line was operated with class 628 diesel multiple units. On 27 April 2014, DB suspended operations for the electrification of the line. The rail service between Dachau and Altomuenster was replaced by buses until December 2014.

On 14 December 2014, the electrical services of line S2 commenced on the line. The service was increased from 38 to 57 pairs of trains. 39 pairs of trains run every hour directly from Altomünster to Munich, with some continuing to Markt Schwaben and Erding in the peak hour. These services combine in Dachau with the S2 services between Peterhausen and Markt Schwaben. These trains are operated with class 423 four-car electrical multiple units of the S-Bahn. The remaining pairs of trains run only between Altomünster and Dachau and contribute to a 30-minute interval service during the peak hour. The additional trains are operated with class 420 four-car electrical multiple units, restoring this class to the Munich S-Bahn network.

The formerly rather brisk freight transport for agricultural products (cereals, milk, cattle), coal, building materials, animal feed and fertilisers mostly ended before the reconstruction of the line in 1982.
