= Petershausen station =

Railway station in Germany

Petershausen (Oberbay)
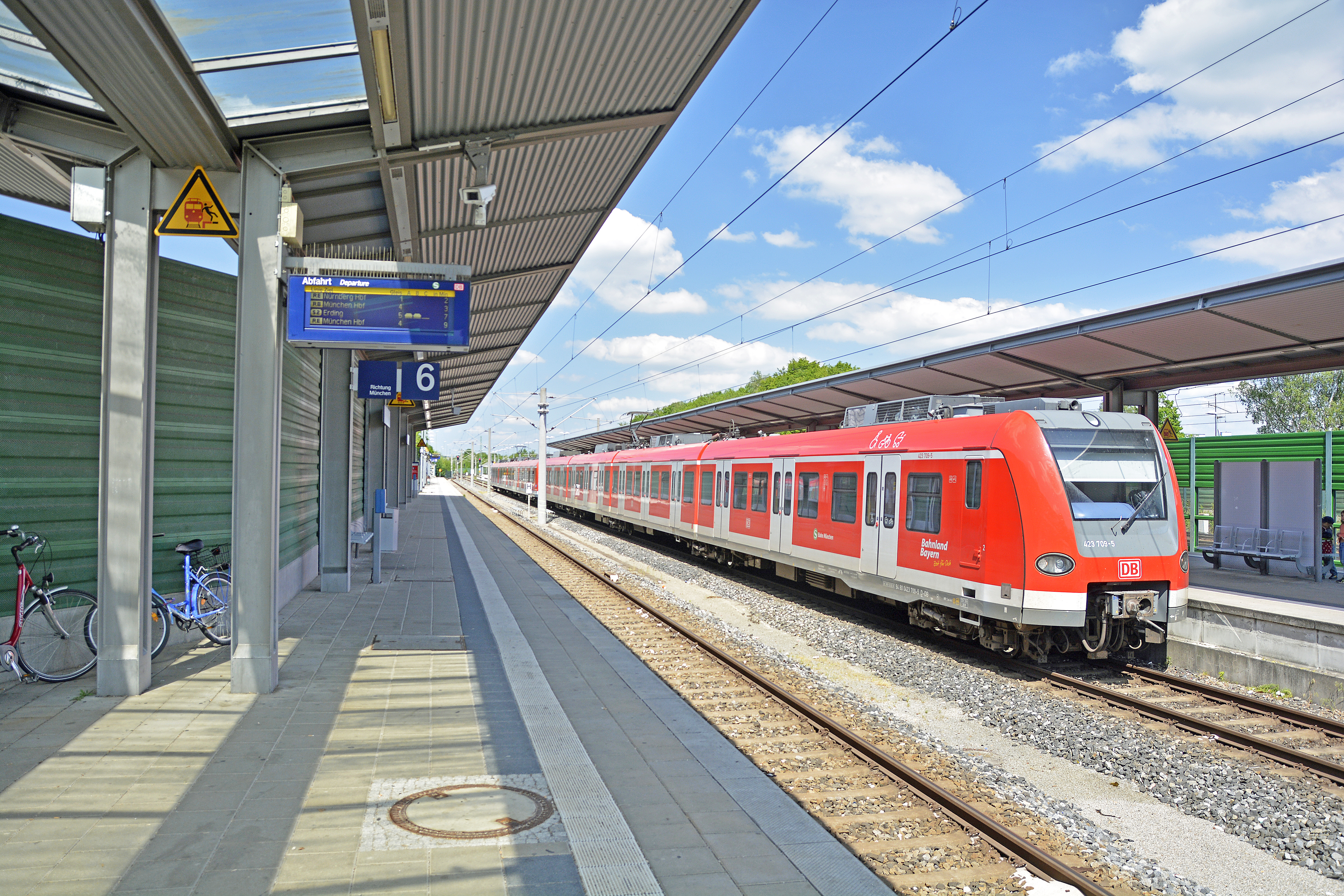
- 2019

General information
- Location: Bahnhofstraße 38; 85238 Petershausen; Bavaria; Germany
- Coordinates: 48°24′37″N 11°28′15″E
- Elevation: 469 m (1,539 ft)
- System: Bf
- Owner: Deutsche Bahn
- Operator: DB Netz; DB Station&Service
- Line: Munich–Treuchtlingen railway
- Train operators: DB Regio Bayern; S-Bahn München
- Connections: 619, 707, 728, 771, 785, 786, 7070, 7080, 9159, 9202

Other information
- Station code: 4907
- DS100 code: MPE
- IBNR: 8004775
- Category: 3
- Fare zone: : 4 and 5
- Website: www.bahnhof.de

History
- Opened: 14 November 1867; 158 years ago

Services
Preceding station	DB Regio Bayern	Following station
Pfaffenhofen (Ilm) towards Nürnberg Hbf	RE 1	München Hbf Terminus
Paindorf towards Nürnberg Hbf	RB 16	Dachau Bahnhof towards München Hbf
Preceding station	Munich S-Bahn	Following station
Terminus	S2	Vierkirchen-Esterhofen towards Erding
Location
- Location within Bavaria Location within Germany Location within Europe

Petershausen station is a railway station in the municipality of Petershausen, located in the district of Dachau in Upper Bavaria, Germany.
