= Altomünster station =

Railway station in Germany

Altomünster
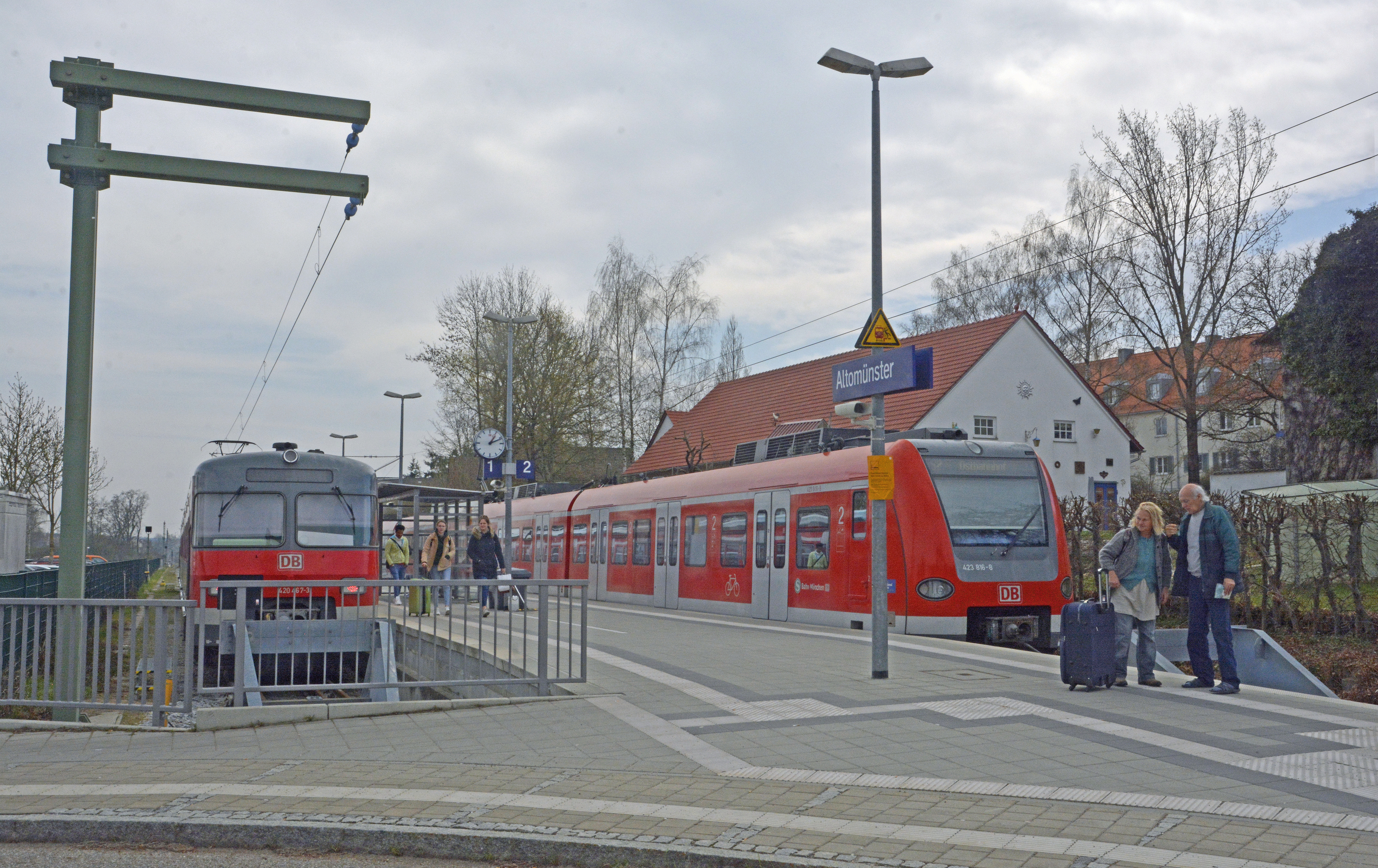

General information
- Location: Bahnhofstraße 3; 85250 Altomünster; Bavaria; Germany
- Coordinates: 48°23′07″N 11°15′17″E
- Elevation: 494 m (1,621 ft)
- Owner: DB Netz
- Operator: DB Station&Service
- Lines: Dachau–Altomünster railway (KBS 999.2)
- Platforms: 1 island platform
- Tracks: 2
- Train operators: S-Bahn München
- Connections: 704, 705, 707, 715, 782

Other information
- Station code: 126
- DS100 code: MAMT
- IBNR: 8000556
- Category: 6
- Fare zone: : 4 and 5
- Website: www.bahnhof.de

History
- Opened: 13 December 1913; 112 years ago

Services
Preceding station	Munich S-Bahn	Following station
Terminus	S2	Kleinberghofen towards Erding
Location
- Location within Bavaria Location within Germany Location within Europe

Altomünster station is a railway station in the municipality of Altomünster, located in the district of Dachau in Upper Bavaria, Germany.
