= Erding station =

Munich S-Bahn station

Erding
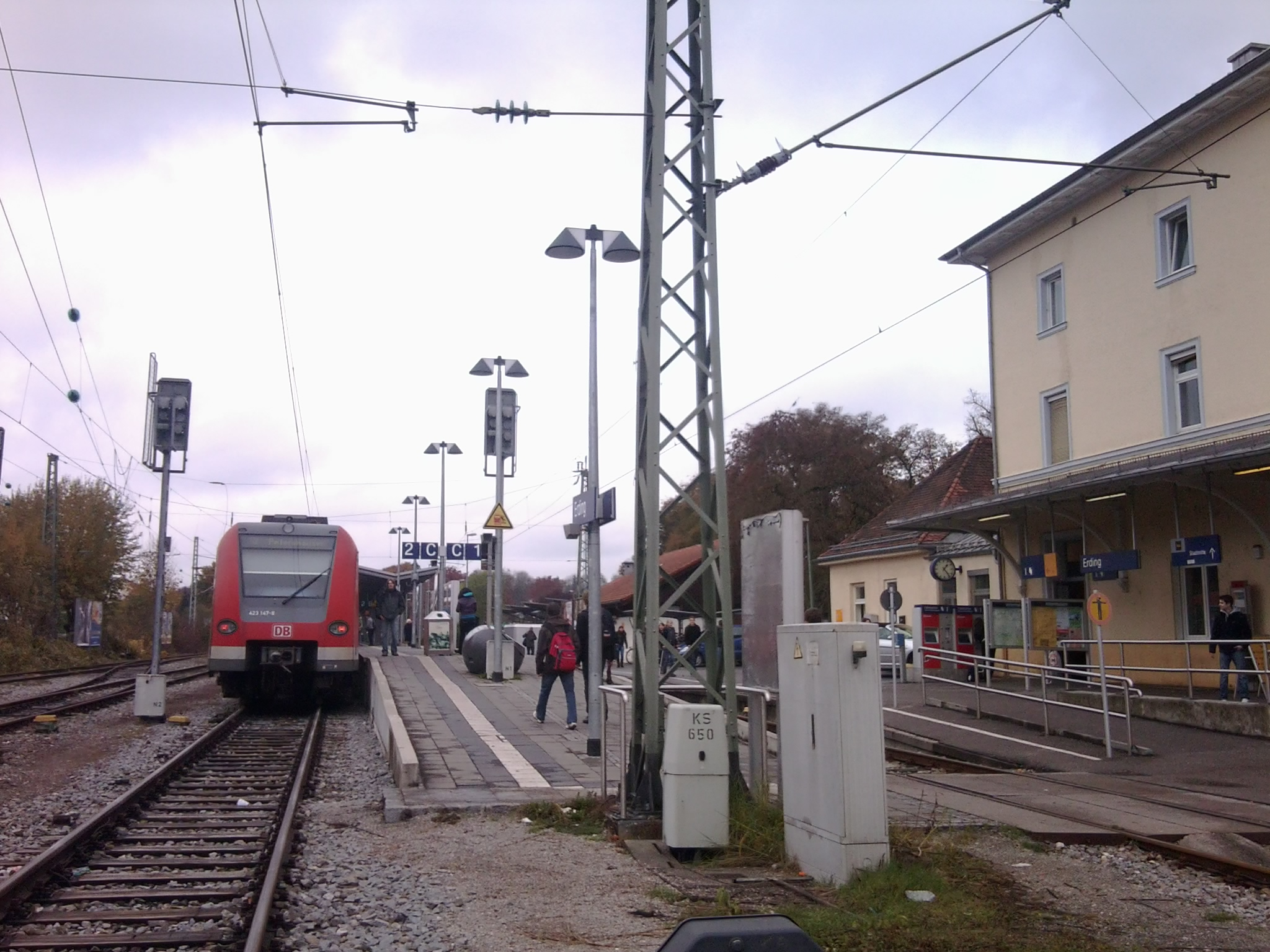
- 2010

General information
- Location: Am Bahnhof 4; 85435 Erding; Bavaria; Germany
- Coordinates: 48.3034°N 11.9121°E
- Owner: Deutsche Bahn
- Operator: DB Netz; DB Station&Service
- Lines: Markt Schwaben–Erding railway (KBS 999.2)
- Platforms: 1 island platform
- Tracks: 2
- Train operators: S-Bahn München
- Connections: 445, 501, 502, 507, 511, 512, 515, 522, 523, 524, 525, 526, 527, 528, 531, 561, 562, 564, 565, 567, 568, 569, 5010, 5020, 5670, 5680

Other information
- Station code: 1626
- DS100 code: MER
- IBNR: 8001825
- Category: 6
- Fare zone: : 4 and 5
- Website: www.bahnhof.de

History
- Opened: 16 December 1872; 153 years ago

Services
Preceding station	Munich S-Bahn	Following station
Altenerding towards Petershausen or Altomünster	S2	Terminus
Location
- Location within Bavaria Location within Germany Location within Europe

Erding station is a railway station on the Munich S-Bahn in the town of Erding in the northeast area of Munich, Germany. It is served by the S-Bahn line S2.
