= S2 (Munich) =

Railway line in Munich, Germany

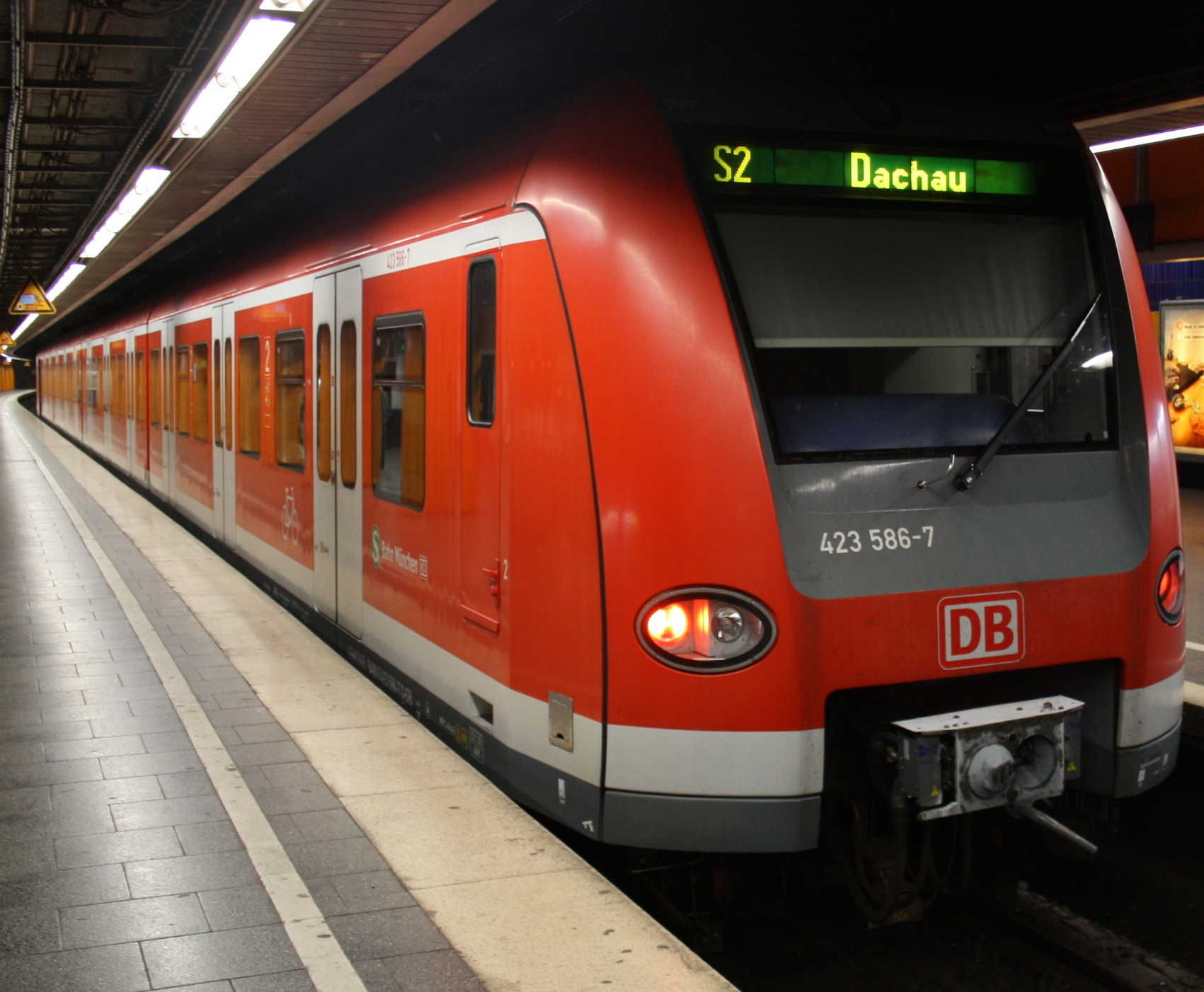

Overview
- System: Munich S-Bahn
- Locale: Munich, Bavaria, Germany
- Current operator(s): S-Bahn Munich

Technical
- Rolling stock: DBAG Class 423
- Electrification: 15 kV, 16.7 Hz AC Overhead lines
- Timetable number(s): 999.2

The S2 is a service on the Munich S-Bahn network. It is operated by DB Regio Bayern. It runs from Petershausen station to Erding station via Dachau, Laim, central Munich, Munich East and Markt Schwaben.

The line is operated at 20-minute intervals between Dachau and Markt Schwaben. One train an hour continues from Dachau to Altomünster and the other two continue from Dachau to Petershausen so that the gap between trains alternates between 20 and 40 minutes between Dachau to Petershausen. Similarly only two out of three continue from Markt Schwaben to Erding, creating a similar varying gap between trains.

Services are operated using class 423 four-car electrical multiple units, usually as two coupled sets. In the evenings and on Sundays they generally run as single sets. Extra peak hour services are operated between Dachau and Altomünster, using class 420 four-car electrical multiple units (this is the only place this class operates on the Munich S-Bahn network), creating a 30-minute frequency on the branch.

The service runs over lines built at various times:

- from Petershausen to Laim over the Munich–Ingolstadt railway, opened by the Royal Bavarian Eastern Railway Company in 1867;
- from Altomünster to Dachau over the Dachau–Altomünster railway, opened by the Royal Bavarian Eastern Railway Company from Dachau to Indersdorf on 8 July 1912 and from Indersdorf to Altomünster on 18 December 1913;
- from Laim to the approaches to Munich Central Station (Hauptbahnhof) over a section of the S-Bahn trunk line laid parallel to the Munich–Augsburg railway, opened by the Munich–Augsburg Railway Company on 1 September 1839;
- the underground section of the S-Bahn trunk line from the approaches to Munich Central Station to Munich East station, opened on 1 May 1971;
- from Munich East to Markt Schwaben over the Munich–Mühldorf railway, opened by the Royal Bavarian State Railways on 1 May 1871; and
- Markt Schwaben to Erding over the Markt Schwaben–Erding railway opened on 16 November 1872.

The S2 was introduced on 28 May 1972 and ran between Petershausen and Deisenhofen. The section between Munich East and Erding was then served by the S6, which ran between Tutzing and Erding. The current route of the S2 was established in 2009. Services commenced between Altomünster and Dachau on 14 December 2014.

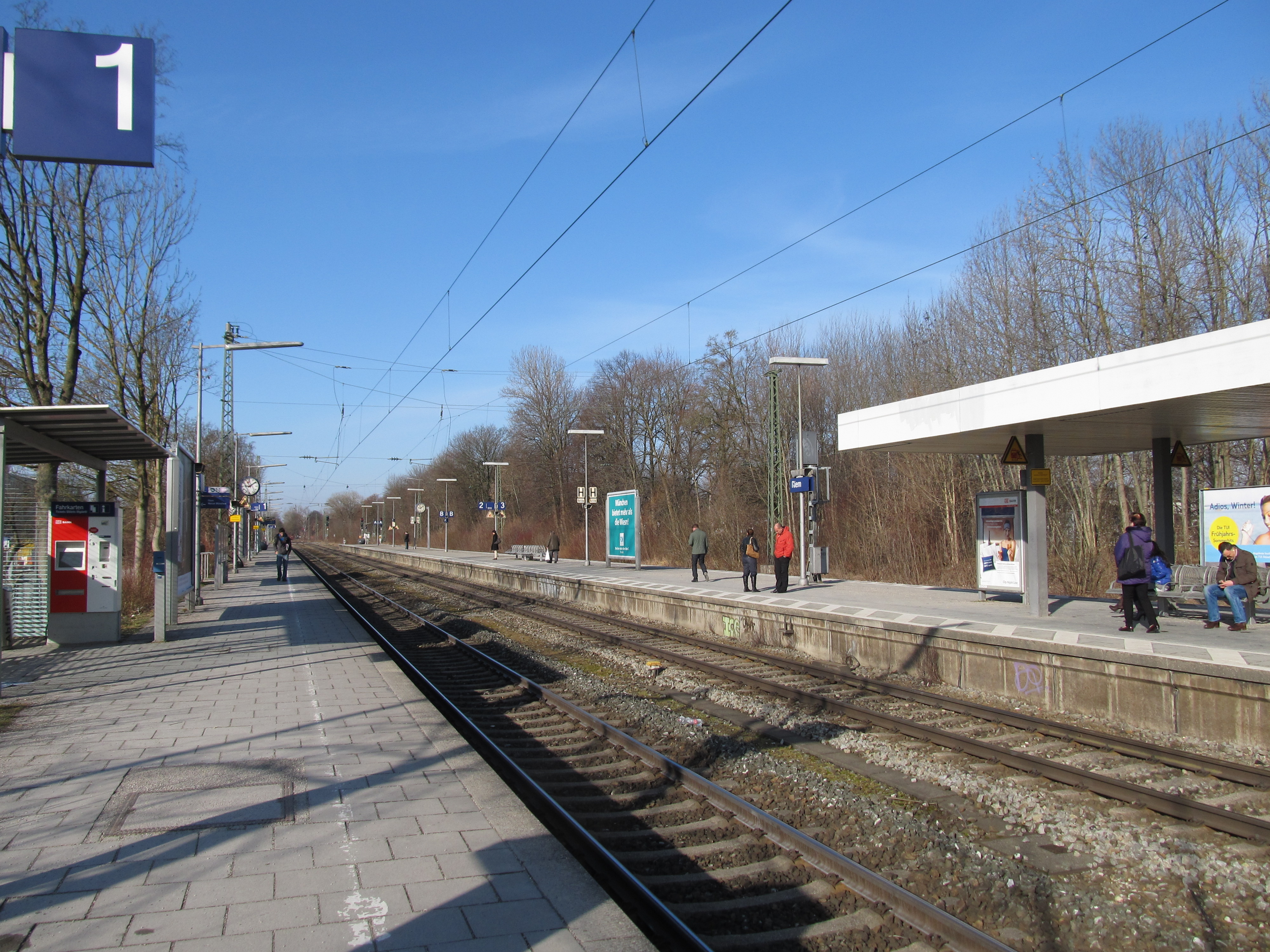
München-Riem station
