= Therme Manchester =

Spa and water park resort in Trafford, England

- Location: Trafford Park, Greater Manchester, England
- Coordinates: 53.46551°N 2.33895°W
- Owner: Therme Group
- Operated by: Therme Group
- Opened: 2028 (planned)
- Operating season: All year round
- Pools: 10 pools
- Water slides: 18 water slides
- Website: thermemanchester.co.uk

Therme Manchester is a spa and water park resort under construction in Greater Manchester, England. As of 17 June 2025, it is scheduled to open in late 2028, and is being built on the former site of the EventCity exhibition centre, adjacent to the Trafford Centre and Trafford Palazzo.

== History ==
=== Planning ===
Plans to realise a large-scale 'wellbeing resort' in TraffordCity were first announced in July 2019, with developers Therme Group inviting local residents to attend a consultation in the summer. Planning permission was subsequently granted to the project by Trafford Council in March 2020.

In June 2023, a new design for the resort was revealed, with a revised planning application to be submitted to Trafford Council. The updated plans include waved glass domed pavilions, external water slides, a roof terrace, multi-storey car park, and landscaped boulevard.

=== Construction ===
Original plans saw the proposed resort opening in 2023, with construction beginning in 2021 - however the COVID-19 pandemic saw this date pushed back by two years — with a 2025 opening date being confirmed in early 2022. This date was pushed back to 2027 in July 2024, then further to late 2028 in June 2025 after an €1billion partnership with CVC was announced.

Plans to demolish the EventCity site were submitted in September 2022, with the works initially expected to be completed in Spring 2023, ahead of the main construction. By January 2023, the EventCity building had been completely demolished, paving the way for construction to start. Due to rare orchid flowers on site, groundwork will not start until at least 2025.

Groundbreaking officially took place in September 2025, with Sir Robert McAlpine appointed as construction managers.

== Resort ==
Upon completion, the resort will occupy 28 acres (11 ha). 10 pools, 18 waterslides and 25 saunas and steam rooms will make up what Therme Group dub an 'urban oasis' - along with the UK's first indoor all-season beach, with lapping waves.

Trafford Palazzo tram stop on the Trafford Park Line of the Metrolink system is located directly outside the resort site.
