= Therme Group =

Developer and operator of health resorts

- Industry: Hospitality
- Services: Spa, sauna, waterpark
- Parent: RHTG Holding GmbH
- Website: www.thermegroup.com

Therme Group RHTG AG is an international developer, owner, and operator of large-scale wellbeing destinations that combine thermal bathing, spa and sauna facilities, wellness, cultural programming and sustainable architecture. Headquartered in Vienna, the company operates some of Europe's largest thermal facilities and is currently expanding into North America, Asia, and the Middle East.

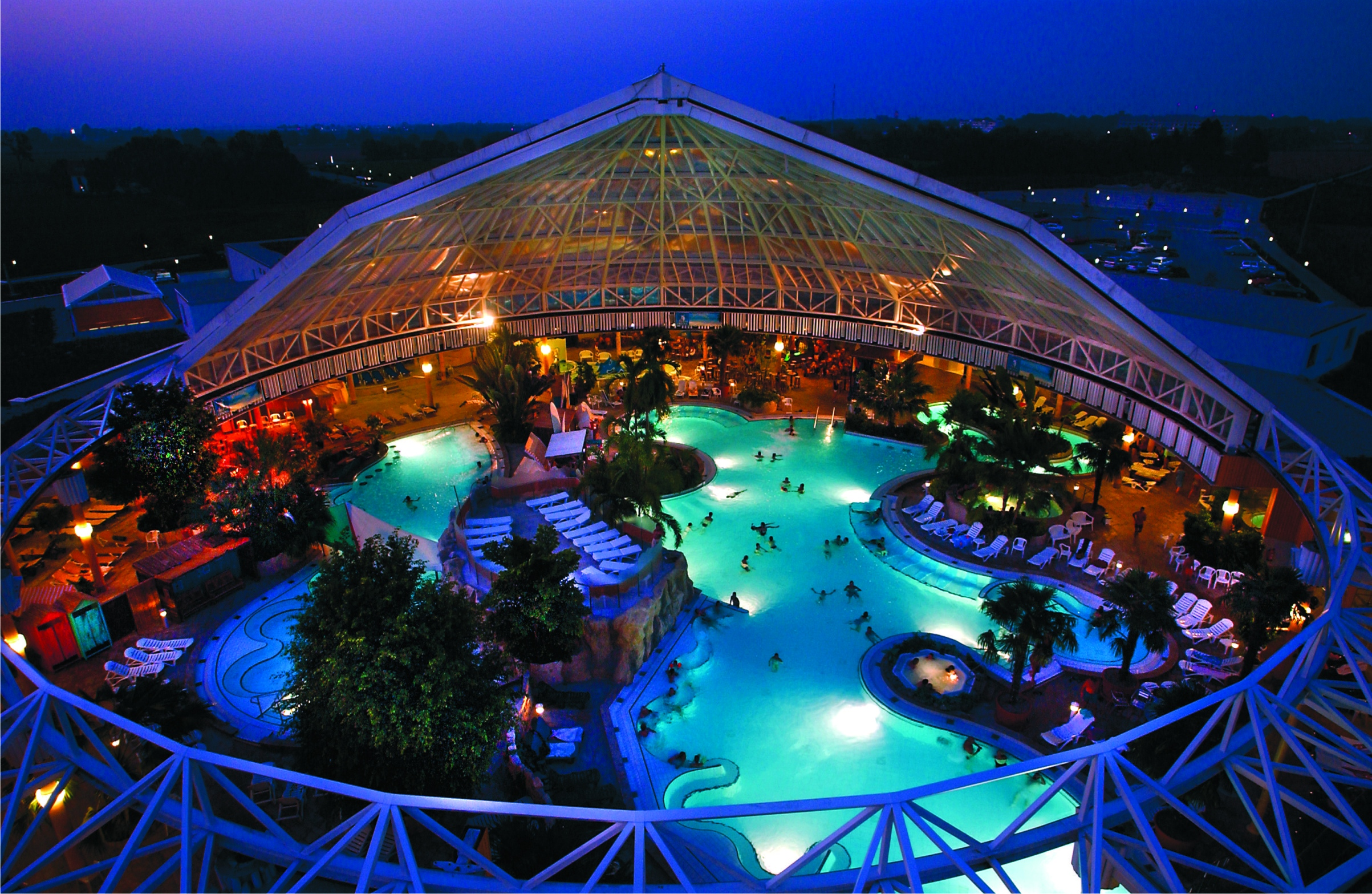
Therme Erding

== History ==
Therme Group was founded in 2011 in Austria. In 2017, the Austrian industrial holding A-HEAT Allied Heat Exchange Technology AG, which already held a minority stake in Therme Bucharest, acquired a 51% interest in the company to support international expansion. That same year, Therme Group established several subsidiaries, including Therme ARC GmbH, which carries forward the architectural vision of the late Josef Wund. Wund, who died in 2017, had been a major influence on the design of Therme Erding and Therme Bucharest.

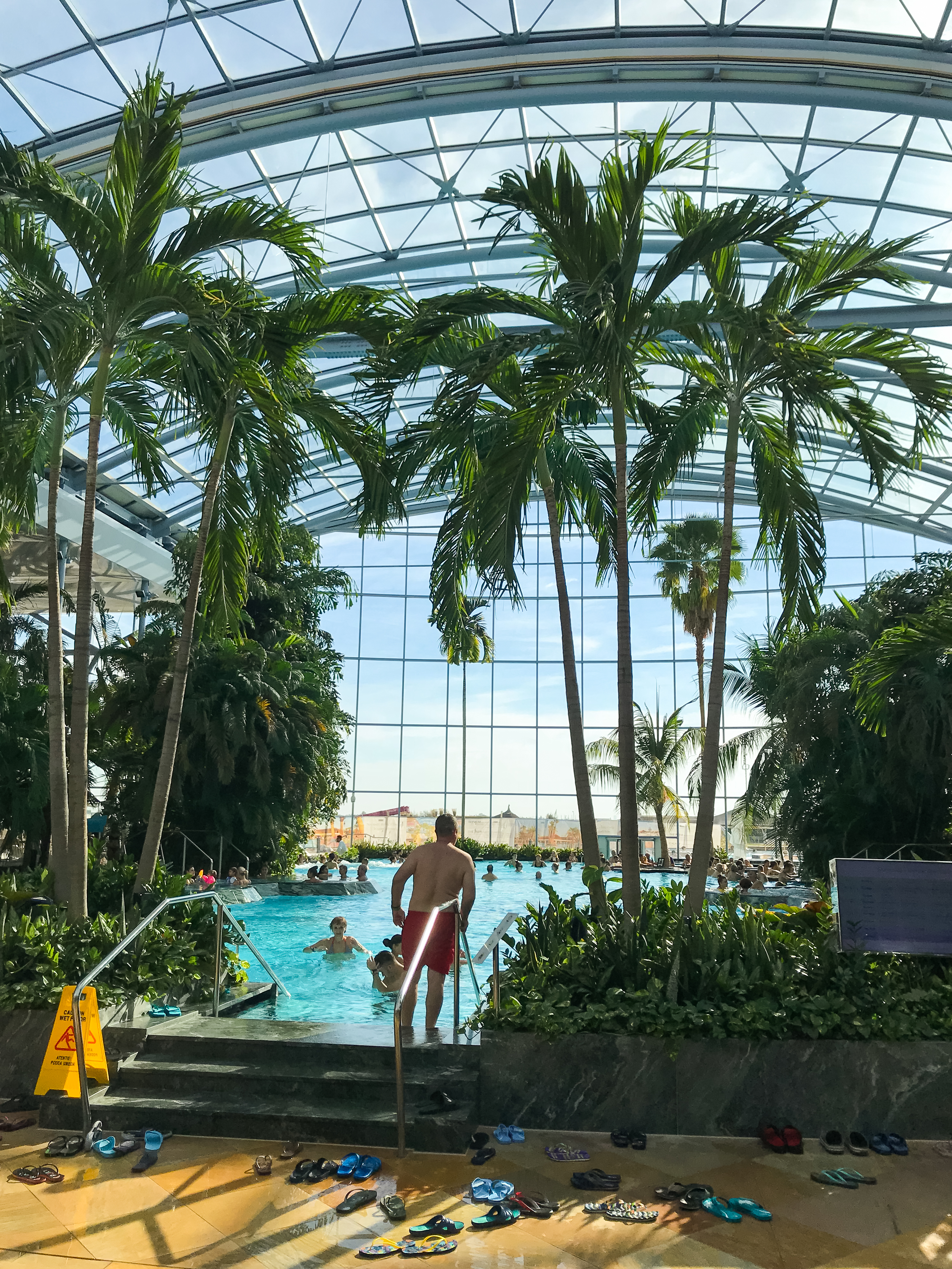
Palms in Romanian water park Therme Bucharest

The company transitioned to a joint-stock corporation (AG) in 2017 and began pursuing growth in new markets. In 2019, Therme entered a research partnership with the University of Glasgow’s COGITO group to study the psychological impact of thermal environments on wellbeing.

By 2020, the majority shareholder of Therme Group RHTG AG had become RHTG Holding GmbH, controlled by Therme founder and CEO Robert Constantin Hanea. A-HEAT retained a 19% minority interest with ongoing financial commitments.

In 2023, Therme partnered with the University of Surrey and the UK government to co-develop digital tools that measure the carbon footprint of tourism assets, including a blockchain-based "carbon tokenomics" model.

In 2024, Therme acquired Therme Erding, previously operated by the Wund family, consolidating its position as operator of two of Europe’s most visited thermal resorts. The acquisition was backed by €320 million in new financing, received from Macquarie Capital's Principal Finance team with its own equity.

In February 2025, Therme Group announced two additional investments to support global expansion. It formed a joint venture with the New York-based Georgetown Company, which acquired a 25% stake in its U.S. business. Separately, asset manager Sculptor Real Estate committed up to €245 million to fully fund the development of Therme Manchester. The company reported that these investments support over $1.5 billion in planned development across the United States.

Later in 2025, Therme formed a €1.25 billion joint venture with CVC Capital Partners, named Therme Horizon, focused on European growth and co-developing Therme Manchester.

In November 2025, Therme Group was awarded the tender by the Singapore Tourism Board to develop a large-scale wellbeing destination at the Marina South Coastal site. The project marks the company's first development in Southeast Asia and its first destination in Singapore, following a competitive public tender process for the waterfront site adjacent to Marina Barrage and Gardens by the Bay. The proposed development is intended to integrate thermal bathing, wellness facilities, and landscape-led public spaces within Singapore's broader urban and tourism strategy.

In December 2025, Therme Group announced the acquisition of three thermal wellbeing destinations in Germany—Euskirchen, Sinsheim, and Titisee-Neustadt—from the Josef Wund Foundation, through its Therme Horizon joint venture with CVC Capital Partners. The transaction was approved by the German Federal Cartel Office in January 2026 and consolidates all four Wund-origin destinations (including Therme Erding, acquired in 2024) under the Therme Horizon platform.

== Investments and ownership structure ==
Therme Group is majority-owned by RHTG Holding GmbH, led by CEO Robert Hanea. A-HEAT Allied Heat Exchange Technology AG holds a 19% stake. The company has raised funding from institutional partners, including a strategic joint venture with CVC Capital Partners. Its financing model combines real estate investment, infrastructure funding, and long-term operational management.

== Locations ==
=== Therme Bucharest (Romania) ===
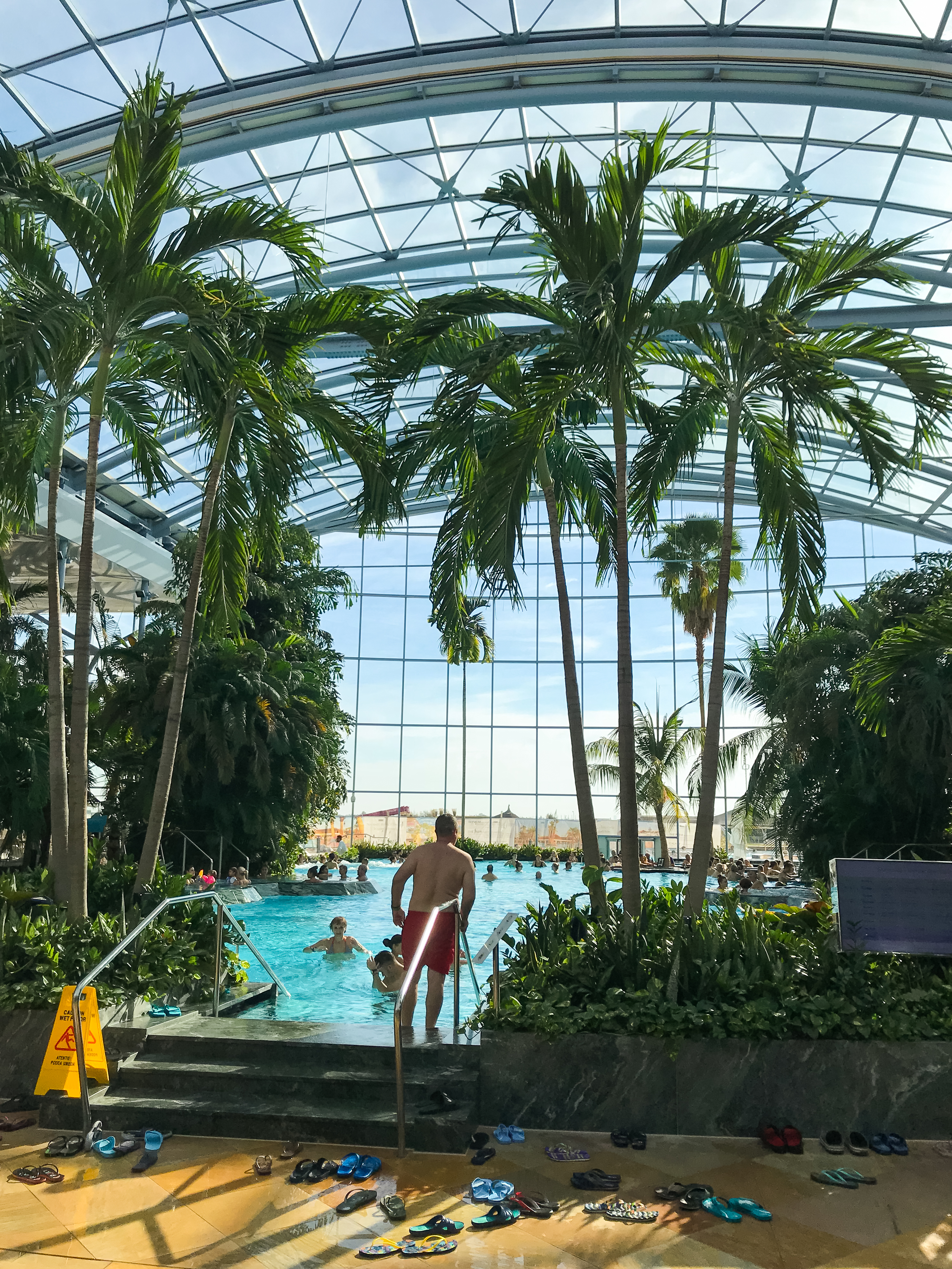
Palms in Therme București

Opened in 2016, Therme Bucharest is a large indoor thermal and wellness complex located in Balotești, north of Bucharest, and has been described in travel coverage as one of the largest spa and wellness destinations in Europe. The facility includes multiple thermal pools, sauna and steam rooms, spa and wellness treatment areas, and a large indoor botanical environment. The complex is organized into multiple zones, including a family-oriented area with water attractions and additional relaxation and wellness areas; travel reporting has highlighted its large sauna program, including aufguss (a guided sauna ritual), and its scale relative to conventional urban spas. Industry and travel sources also describe the site as incorporating extensive planted landscapes—reported as roughly 800,000 plants—and maintaining resort-style indoor temperatures year-round within a glass-and-steel structure; the complex has also been described as including a retractable roof section during summer months. Therme Bucharest uses geothermal thermal water (reported as drawn from approximately 3,000 meters underground) supplying its pools, with some sources describing the pool water temperature as maintained around 33 °C. Visitor figures reported by industry bodies and trade organizations have placed attendance at over 1.2 million visitors in its first year of operation, with daily attendance averaging in the thousands and reaching higher volumes on peak days. In sustainability certification, the U.S. Green Building Council’s LEED project directory lists Therme București as LEED Platinum certified under LEED BD+C (New Construction v3 / LEED 2009), with certification recorded in December 2018.

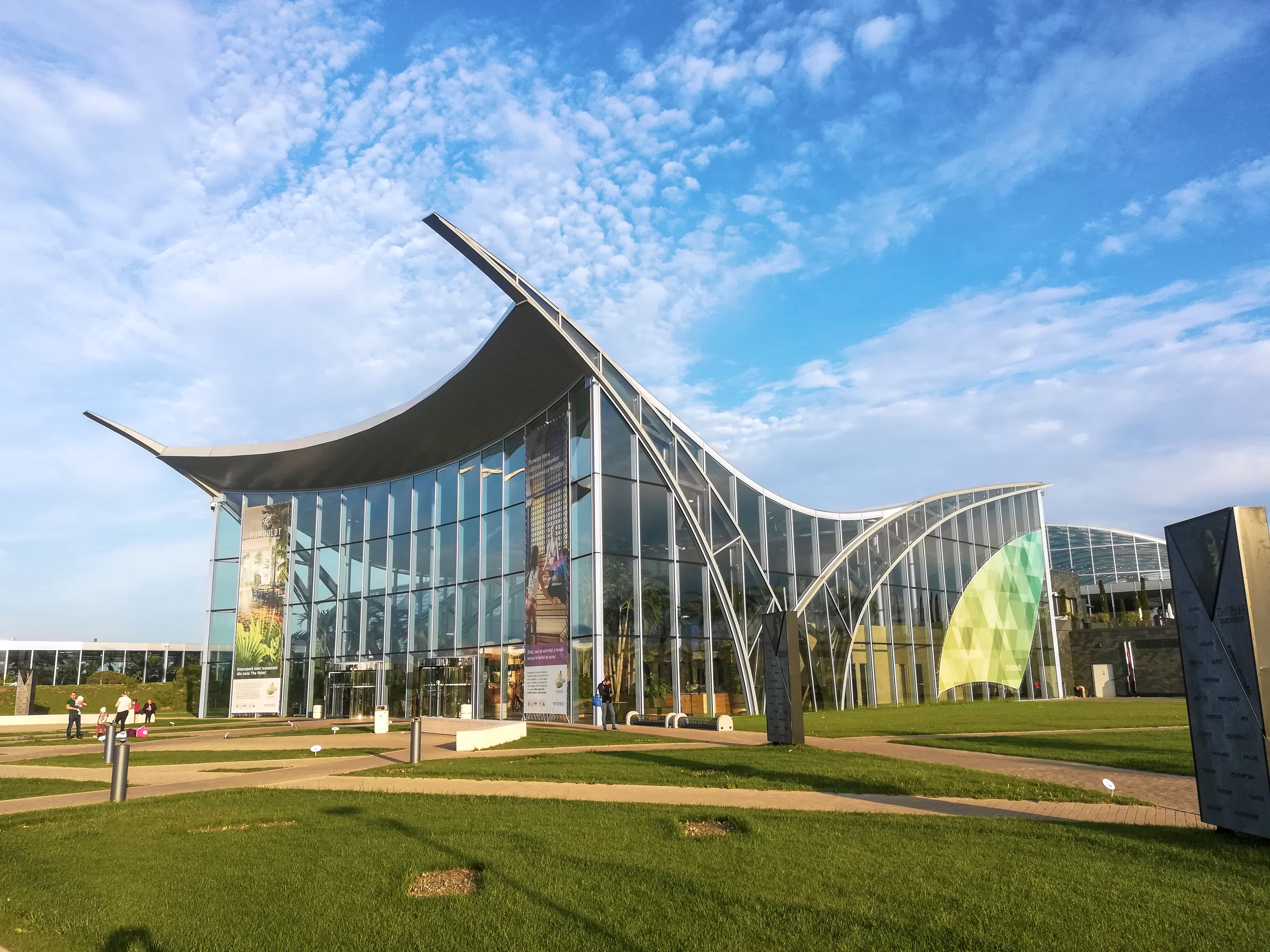
Therme Bucuresti

=== Therme Erding (Germany) ===
Acquired in 2024, Therme Erding is the world’s largest indoor thermal resort. It includes multiple themed areas, wave pools, and over 30 saunas, attracting more than 2 million visitors each year.

=== Therme Euskirchen (Euskirchen, North Rhine-Westphalia) ===
Therme Euskirchen is a thermal and wellness complex in Euskirchen on the northern edge of the Eifel region. It opened on 18 December 2015 and includes a palm-themed bathing area (“Palmenparadies”), a textile-free sauna and wellness zone (“Vitaltherme & Sauna”), and a sports pool area. Regional reporting has described the site as drawing significant visitor volumes since opening.

=== Thermen & Badewelt Sinsheim (Sinsheim, Baden-Württemberg) ===
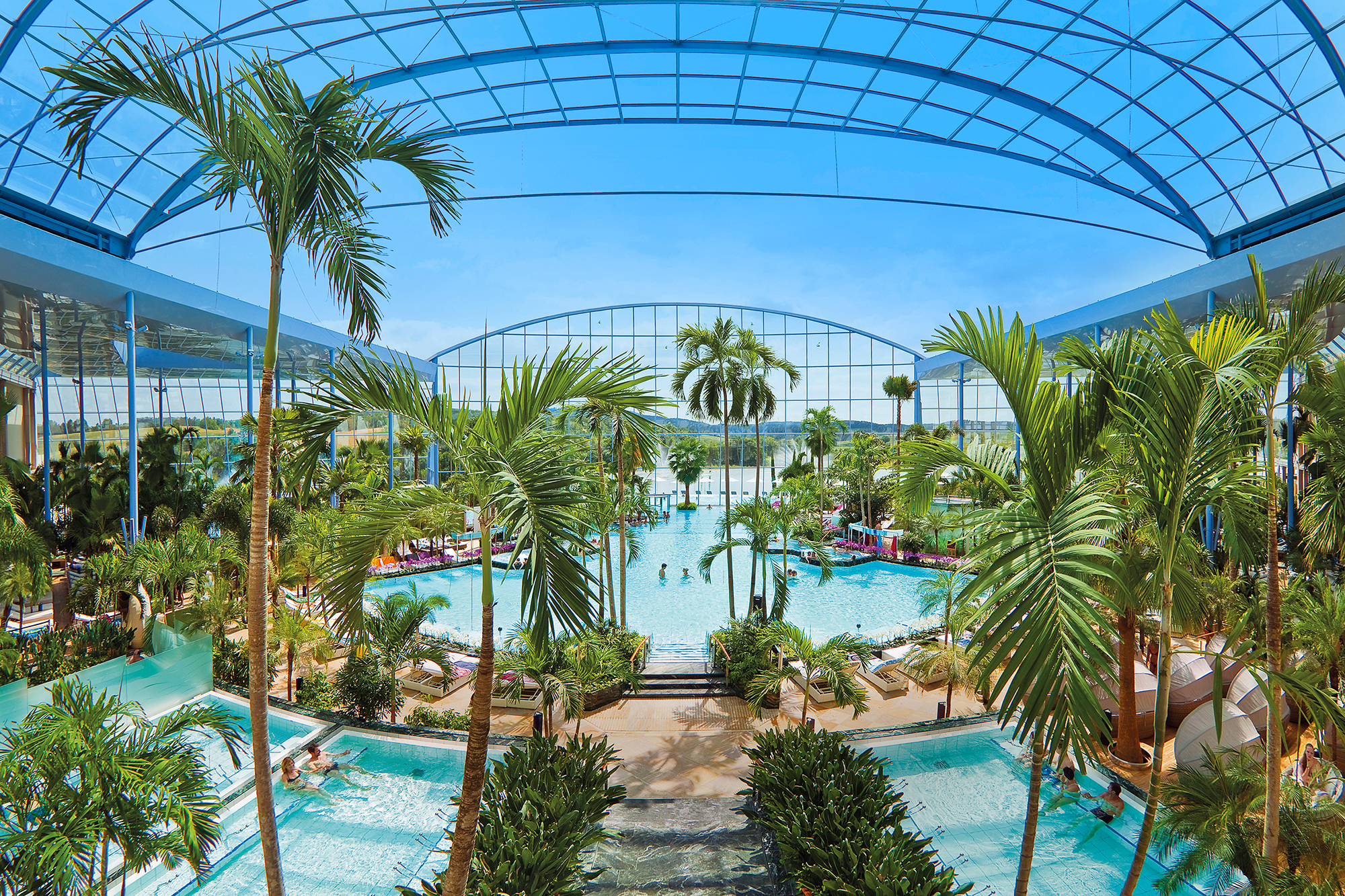
Thermen & Badewelt Sinsheim, panorama view

Thermen & Badewelt Sinsheim is a thermal bath and sauna complex in Sinsheim (Rhein-Neckar district) that opened on 19 December 2012. It features a palm-themed bathing hall and a large sauna offering; in 2013, Der Spiegel reported that the venue received recognition from Guinness World Records for what was described as the world's largest sauna (“Koi-Sauna”), with the article noting its scale and aquarium-facing design.

=== Badeparadies Schwarzwald (Titisee-Neustadt, Baden-Württemberg) ===
Badeparadies Schwarzwald is a leisure and wellness water complex in Titisee-Neustadt, in Germany's Black Forest, which opened on 11 December 2010. It comprises multiple areas including a palm-oasis bathing zone and additional wellness/sauna facilities; local business coverage has cited the venue as attracting over 720,000 guests per year.

=== Therme Bad Vilbel (Germany) ===
Located near Frankfurt, Therme Bad Vilbel will feature thermal bathing, wellness zones, restaurants, and green parkland. The design emphasizes sustainability and urban integration.

=== Therme Manchester (United Kingdom) ===
Planned as one of the UK's largest wellbeing attractions, Therme Manchester received planning approval in 2020 following public consultation. The £400million facility is backed by Therme Horizon, the CVC joint venture. It has been described by local officials as a “transformative cultural and wellness hub.” The location will be double the size of the Bucharest location, and will include 20 on-site saunas, 25 water slides, 20 restaurants, and colorful botanic gardens set to open in 2028. Sustainable construction is being implemented, including utilizing locally sourced materials, air source heat pumps, on-site 3D printing of building components, and reducing waste and emissions with accelerated delivery. The destination is projected to create around 2,500 construction jobs, and will employ 650 staff to operate the resort. A Beyond Groundbreaking launch ceremony in September 2025 brought together politicians, partners and community members to celebrate the beginning of the construction work for the first UK city-based wellbeing resort.

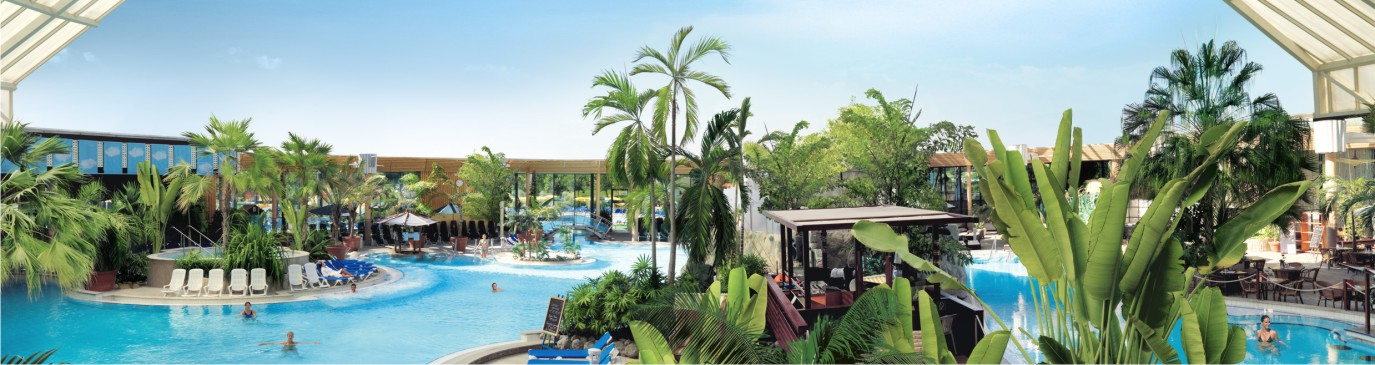
Therme Erding

=== Therme Canada, Ontario Place (Toronto) ===
In partnership with the Ontario government, Therme is developing a C$700 million wellness destination at Ontario Place. The project includes thermal baths, indoor and outdoor attractions, and 16 acres of public parkland designed with input from the Mississaugas of the Credit First Nation. It has faced public scrutiny and political debate since its announcement in 2021. In April 2025, the New York Times published an investigation into Therme Group's involvement in the Ontario Place redevelopment and reported that Therme may have inflated its credentials and incorrectly claimed to have the required 100 million CAD equity to meet the province's bid requirements. The report raised questions about the company's financial qualifications, transparency of the public tender process, and political oversight. Criticism has also focused on the balance between public and private space in the Ontario Place plans. In December 2024, the Auditor General of Ontario criticized the Therme Canada project on the Toronto waterfront as opaque and unfair and that the Therme Group had included information about "Therme" projects that it did not control in its bid. In response, Ontario Premier Doug Ford and Minister of Infrastructure Kinga Surma defended the selection, citing due diligence. Through a subsequent freedom of information request, the Ontario NDP obtained emails that suggest due diligence was not performed as claimed.

Canadian company Groupe Nordik, which has operated spas under the similar "Thermea" brand since 2015, including a location in the Toronto suburb of Whitby, Ontario, insists it has no affiliation with Therme Group, saying that it has filed legal actions challenging Therme Group's use of the "Therme" name in Canada.

=== Therme Washington, DC (USA) ===
A large-scale wellbeing destination is planned for Poplar Point along the Anacostia River. The site is intended to support community recreation and sustainable tourism in the U.S. capital. Therme Group organized a pop-up wellness festival in October 2025 at outdoor venue Sandlot Anacostia, including a collection of mobile saunas, yoga and dancing workshops, kid-friendly activities, and a market with local goods.

=== Therme Dallas (USA) ===
Announced in 2025, Therme Dallas will be located in North Texas and is expected to open in the late 2020s. The facility will combine spa infrastructure with art, nature, and hospitality elements.

=== Therme Dubai (UAE) ===
Revealed in 2025, Therme Dubai will be located in the Zabeel Park development. The design draws inspiration from the desert landscape and includes cutting-edge architectural features for heat mitigation and sustainability. The project will combine wellness, recreation, family fun, healthcare services, and natural surroundings. It will span 500,000 sq. ft., stand 100 meters high, and accommodate up to 1.7 million visitors annually. With an innovative design that combines nature, technology, and luxury, Therme Dubai will feature the world's largest indoor botanical garden, complete with towering waterfalls and rejuvenating thermal pools. The wellness resort and interactive park is set to be the Middle East's first of its kind.

=== Therme Incheon (South Korea) ===
Therme signed a memorandum of understanding with South Korean officials to develop a wellness complex in Incheon.The facility is expected to blend traditional bathing cultures with contemporary spa architecture. The new destination will be located within Songdo Golden Harbor, a 427,000-square-metre tourism and leisure district in Incheon. In this section of the “smart city”, a tourism and leisure complex is to be created, comprising hotels, accommodation facilities, shopping areas, as well as providing access for both cruise ships and car ferries.

=== Therme Singapore ===
Therme Singapore is a planned large-scale wellbeing destination located at Marina South Coastal in Singapore. In 2025, the Singapore Tourism Board awarded the site's development tender to Therme Group following a public procurement process. The project will occupy a four-hectare waterfront site adjacent to Marina Barrage and Gardens by the Bay. According to trade and regional tourism reporting, the development is expected to combine thermal bathing, spa and sauna facilities, and landscaped public areas designed to complement Singapore's existing urban green spaces. The destination is projected to welcome approximately two million visitors annually, with an estimated half originating from international markets.

== See also ==
- Therme Manchester
- Therme Erding
