= EventCity =

Former venue in Greater Manchester, England

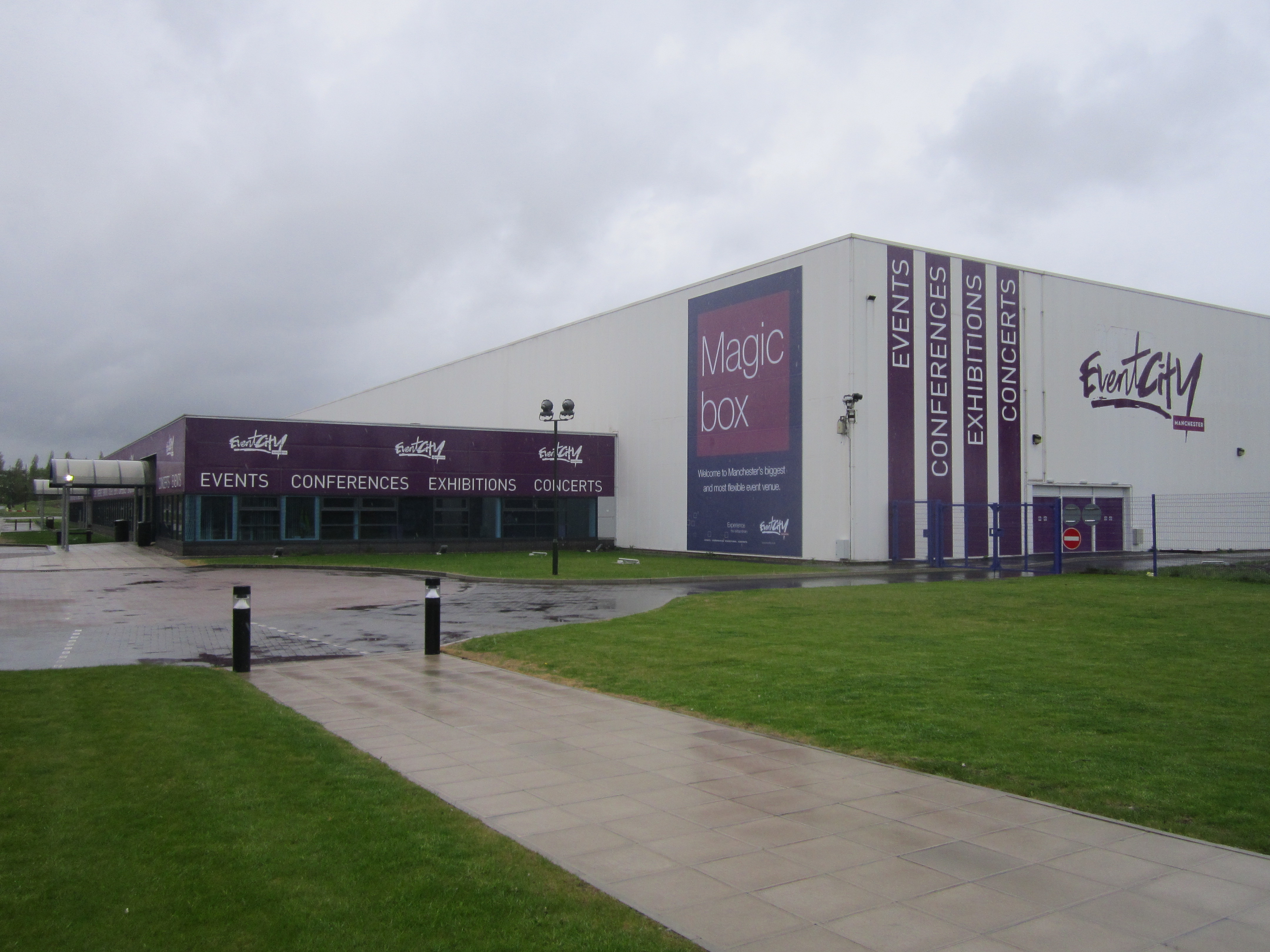
- EventCity in 2013
- Interactive map of EventCity
- Former names: Museum of Museums (2010–11)
- Address: Phoenix Way, Barton Dock Road, Manchester, M41 7TB
- Location: Trafford Park, Greater Manchester
- Coordinates: 53.46551°N 2.33895°W
- Owner: The Peel Group

Construction
- Built: 1995 (as factory)
- Opened: 2011
- Closed: 2021
- Demolished: 2022–23

Website
- www.eventcity.co.uk

EventCity Limited was a conference, gala dinner and exhibition venue in Greater Manchester, England, which was closed in 2021 and later demolished in 2022–2023. It opened in 2011 and was the largest event venue in the North of England, with four halls and a combined space of 28,000 m^{2} (300,000 sq ft).

EventCity was located in TraffordCity, an entertainment and leisure destination. Adjacent to the Trafford Centre, junctions 9 and 10 of the M60 motorway and the Barton Dock Road tram stop are close by. It was closed during 2021 as a consequence of the COVID-19 pandemic. The plans for an alternative venue were also scrapped by the previous owners.

== History ==
The building was built in 1995 as a factory for Manchester Tobacco. Peel Group subsequently acquired the building from them and leased it to the retailer Argos who used the building as a warehouse. Once the lease expired, the building became the Museum of Museums from October 2010 to January 2011, when it was converted to its use for conferences and exhibitions.

== Events ==
EventCity hosted events including the Caravan and Motorhome Show 2012, the Manchester auditions for The X Factor and the Woman's Weekly Creative Stitchcraft and Hobbycrafts Show. Event City also hosted the Roller Derby World Cup in 2018.

EventCity also hosted a series of corporate Christmas parties throughout December every year.

== Therme Manchester resort ==
It had been proposed that EventCity would relocate to a site further west (formerly occupied by the Trafford Soccer Dome) whilst the existing site would be redeveloped into the Therme Manchester spa and water park resort. However, Peel announced in mid-2020 that the relocation plans had been scrapped, and EventCity would permanently close after all contracted events had taken place in early 2022.

Plans to demolish the EventCity site were submitted to Trafford Council in September 2022, with the works initially expected to be completed in Spring 2023, ahead of the main construction of the resort. By January 2023, the EventCity building had been completely demolished. In March 2023, construction of Therme Manchester began.
