= Aufhausen (bei Erding) station =

Munich S-Bahn station

Aufhausen (b Erding)
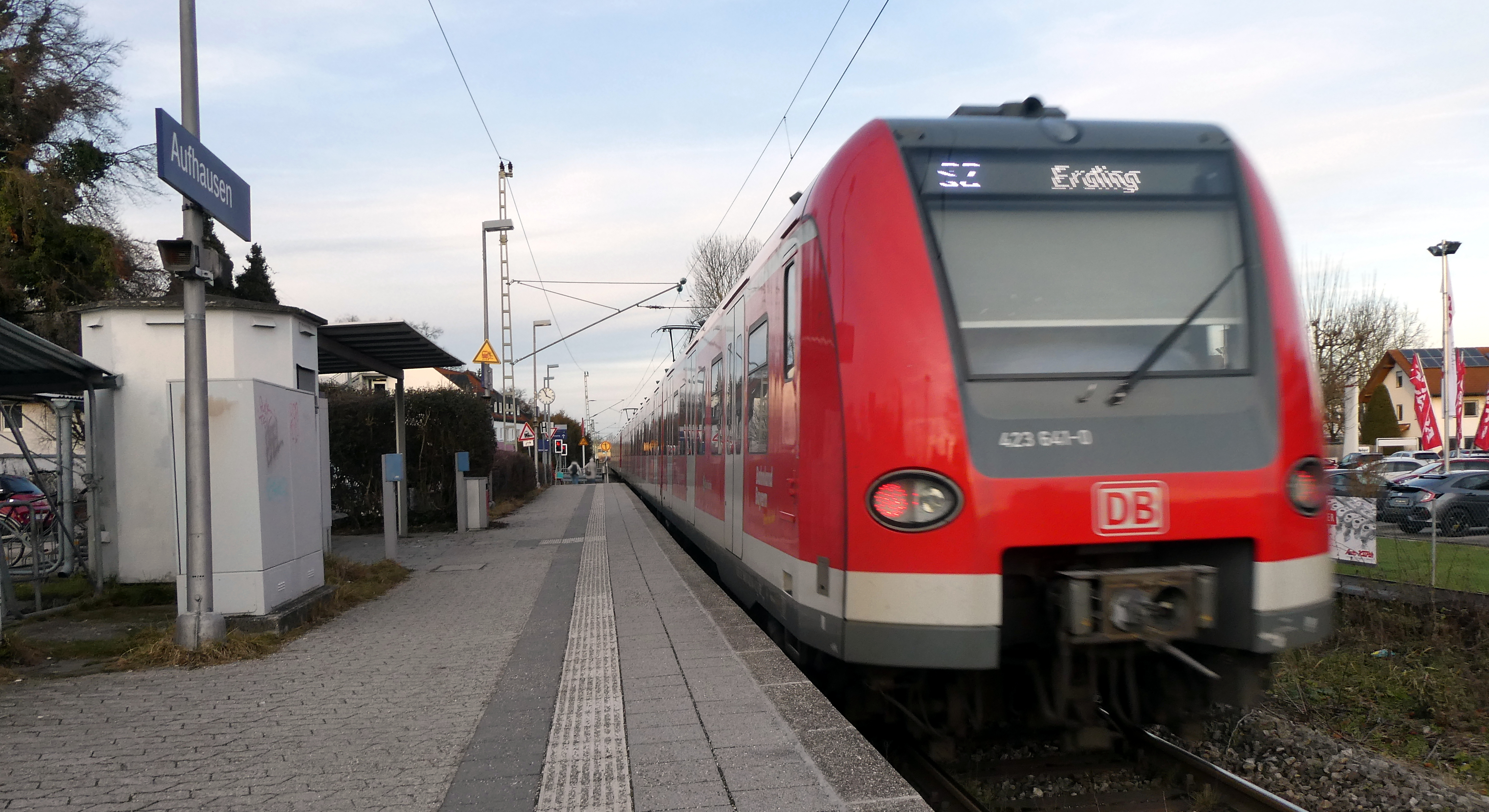

General information
- Location: Pretzener Straße 2; 85435 Erding; Bavaria; Germany
- Coordinates: 48.2744°N 11.8943°E
- Owner: DB Netz
- Operator: DB Station&Service
- Lines: Markt Schwaben–Erding railway (KBS 999.2)
- Platforms: 1 side platform
- Tracks: 1
- Train operators: S-Bahn München
- Connections: 445

Other information
- Station code: 216
- DS100 code: MAFE
- IBNR: 8000653
- Category: 6
- Fare zone: : 4 and 5
- Website: www.bahnhof.de

History
- Opened: 16 November 1872; 153 years ago

Services
Preceding station	Munich S-Bahn	Following station
St. Koloman towards Petershausen or Altomünster	S2	Altenerding towards Erding
Location
- Location within Bavaria Location within Germany Location within Europe

Aufhausen (bei Erding) station is a railway station in the Aufhausen district of the municipality of Erding, located in the Erding district in Upper Bavaria, Germany.
