= Altenerding station =

Munich S-Bahn station

Altenerding
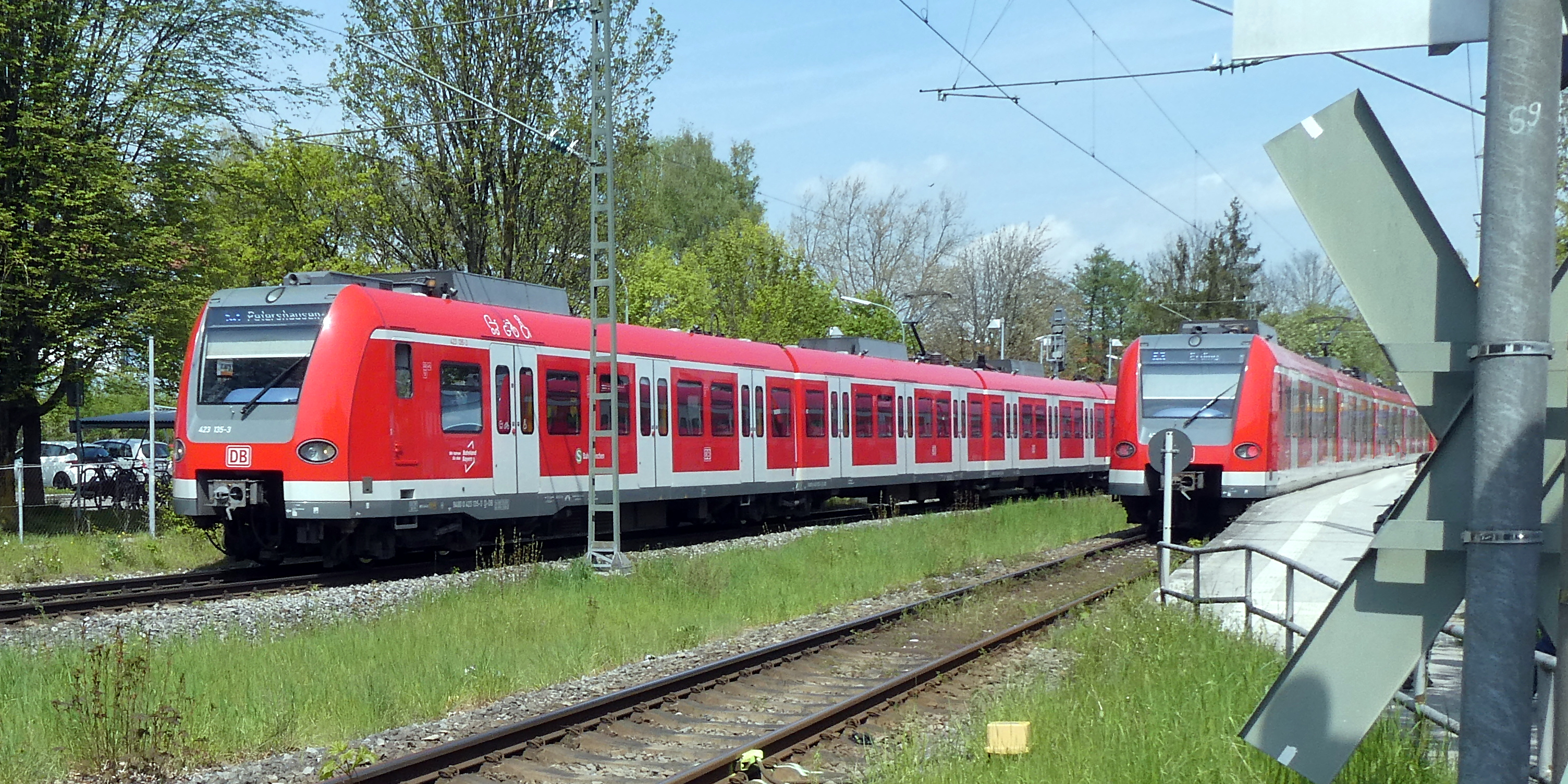

General information
- Location: Bahnhofstraße 34; 85435 Erding; Bavaria; Germany
- Coordinates: 48.2937°N 11.9018°E
- Owner: Deutsche Bahn
- Operator: DB Netz; DB Station&Service
- Lines: Markt Schwaben–Erding railway (KBS 999.2)
- Platforms: 2 side platforms
- Tracks: 2
- Train operators: S-Bahn München
- Connections: 445, 501, 502, 507, 522, 525, 526, 527, 528, 531, 562, 564, 568, 569, 5680

Other information
- Station code: 94
- DS100 code: MANE
- IBNR: 8000524
- Category: 6
- Fare zone: : 4 and 5
- Website: www.bahnhof.de

History
- Opened: 1 May 1899; 127 years ago

Services
| Preceding station | Munich S-Bahn | Following station |
|---|---|---|
| Aufhausen (bei Erding) towards Petershausen or Altomünster | S2 | Erding Terminus |
Location
- Location within Bavaria Location within Germany Location within Europe

Altenerding station is a railway station in the Altenerding district of the municipality of Erding, located in the Erding district in Upper Bavaria, Germany.

Bus connections (525, 527, 528) are available from this station to Therme Erding, Europe’s largest thermal bath complex.
