= Trafford Palazzo =

Entertainment and shopping complex in Trafford, Greater Manchester

Coordinates: 53.4671°N 2.3413°W

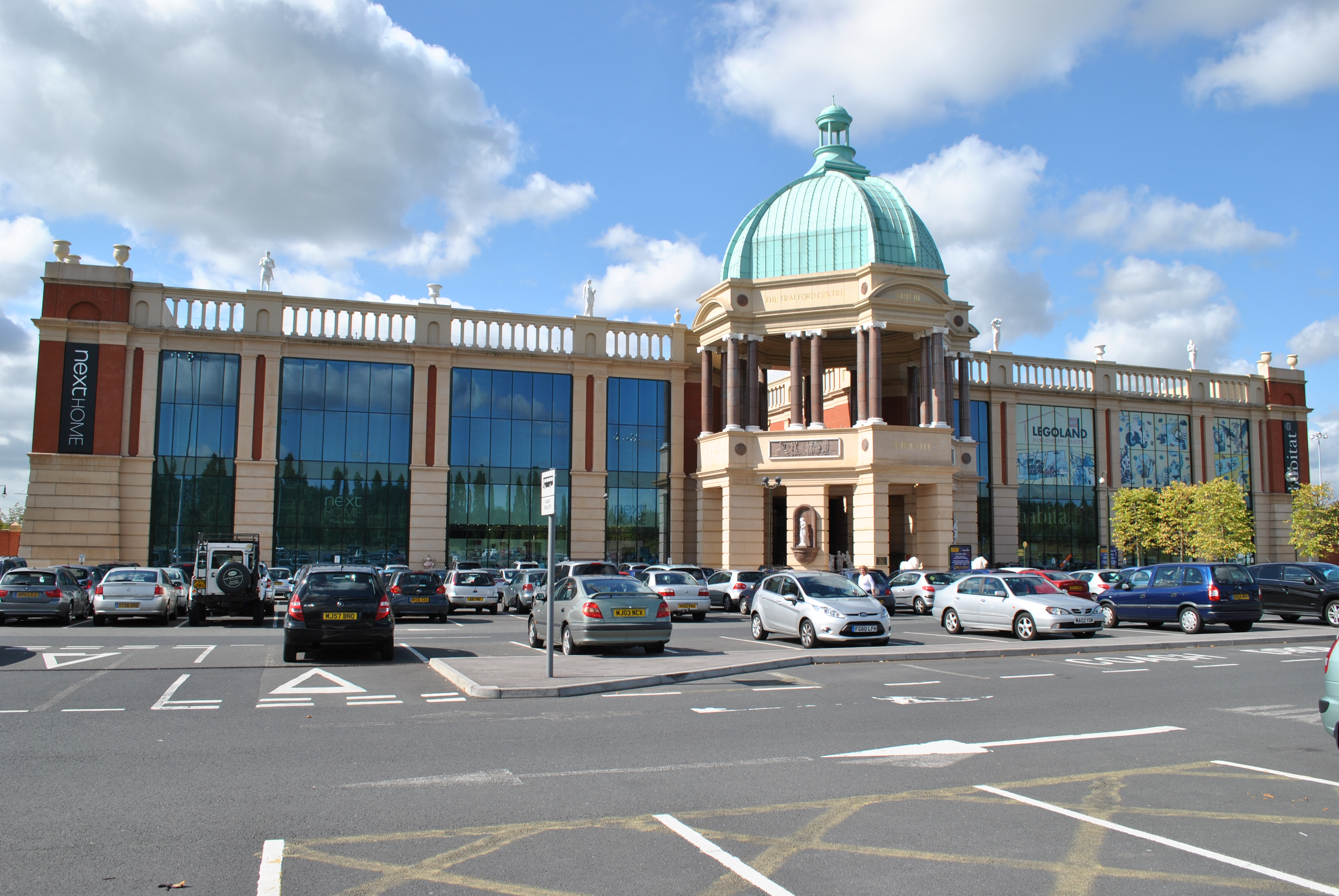
- The main entrance to Trafford Palazzo
- Location: Dumplington, Trafford, Greater Manchester, England
- Opened: 30 March 2008; 18 years ago
- Developer: The Peel Group
- Owner: Peel Land and Property
- Num. of anchor tenants: 1: Primark (2020–present)
- Floor area: 200,000 sq ft (19,000 m^{2})
- Floors: 2
- Public transit: Manchester Metrolink - Trafford Palazzo
- Website: traffordpalazzo.co.uk

Trafford Palazzo (formerly Barton Square) is a shopping and entertainment complex in Trafford Park, Greater Manchester, England. Opening as a new wing of the neighbouring Trafford Centre in 2008, it was spun off as a separate entity in 2020 during the collapse of its former owner Intu Properties.

The centre is anchored by the fashion retailer Primark. Sports Direct also have a major presence at the centre. Trafford Palazzo is also home to several leisure tenants including King Pins, Sea Life Centre and Legoland Discovery Centre.

== History ==
Developed by The Peel Group, the 19,000 square metres (200,000 sq ft), Trafford Palazzo opened as Barton Square on 20 March 2008 at a cost of £90 million. The former name referenced the name of the street the centre is situated on, Barton Dock Road which refers to nearby Barton-upon-Irwell.

Opening as an extension to The Trafford Centre, Barton Square was originally intended to house retailers specialising in homeware, furniture, appliances and other 'bulky goods'. The centre's original tenants included Dwell, British Home Stores and M&S Home.

Over time the centre began to pivot from simply homeware to leisure with tenants such as Legoland Discovery Centre and Sea Life opening.

=== Intu ===
Peel Group sold The Trafford Centre, including Barton Square, to Capital Shopping Centres (CSC) in January 2011 for £1.6 billion, in cash and shares, and John Whittaker, chairman of Peel Group, became deputy chairman of CSC. He later claimed he could have sold the centre for over £2 billion if he had been prepared to accept just cash. Nevertheless, the £1.6 billion deal remained the largest property transaction in British history, and the biggest European property deal of 2011.

As of 2017, Intu claimed a fair market value of £2.312 billion for the centre. However, the firm entered administration in June 2020 and the centre was placed into receivership by its creditors in November 2020. In 2020, the Canada Pension Plan Investment Board, who had loaned Intu £250 million in 2017, exercised their rights as creditors to take ownership of the complex excluding Barton Square, which would be legally separated from The Trafford Centre.

=== Post-Intu ===
Barton Square was spun off as a separate entity to The Trafford Centre during the collapse of Intu in 2020. It was then put up for sale as part of the administration process with an asking price in excess of £50 million. In May 2021 Peel Land and Property, its original developers announced they had re-acquired the centre for an undisclosed sum. Peel subsequently re branded the centre to Trafford Palazzo in November 2021 celebrating the occasion with a weekend of live events.

Trafford Palazzo and The Trafford Centre now operate as rival centres despite being physically linked.

== Building ==
Trafford Palazzo is linked to the Trafford Centre by a glazed footbridge and was originally an open air centre designed to resemble an Italian Renaissance piazza.

The original architects of The Trafford Centre, Chapman Taylor and Leech Rhodes Walker designed Trafford Palazzo to follow a similar theme to its older sibling, its notable architectural features include a central fountain and 67 metre high campanile tower.

=== Redevelopment ===
A £75 million 110,000 sq ft major redevelopment project for the centre was announced in 2017 and commenced in mid 2018. This included adding a first floor and a glazed roof to increase the retail space and fully enclose the centre. Similar to The Trafford Centre, the building had been designed with provision in place to make these adaptations at a future date if the need arose.

As the centre had to remain open during the refurbishment much of the work had to be carried out at night. Special measures needed to be taken by the contractors to limit noise and vibrations to avoid disturbing sea creatures housed at the on site Sealife Centre. The redevelopment work was completed in March 2020.

The new decoration scheme follows a similar classical theme to the original Trafford Centre complete with granite and marble flooring, murals and palm trees. As a tribute to the 22 people who died in the 2017 Manchester Arena bombing, the roman themed murals adorning the revamped centre feature 22 bees.

Pupils from Barton Clough Primary School laid a time capsule in the floor during February 2020 following in the footsteps of their alumni who laid the time capsule in the floor of The Trafford Centre 22 years earlier.

=== Gallery ===
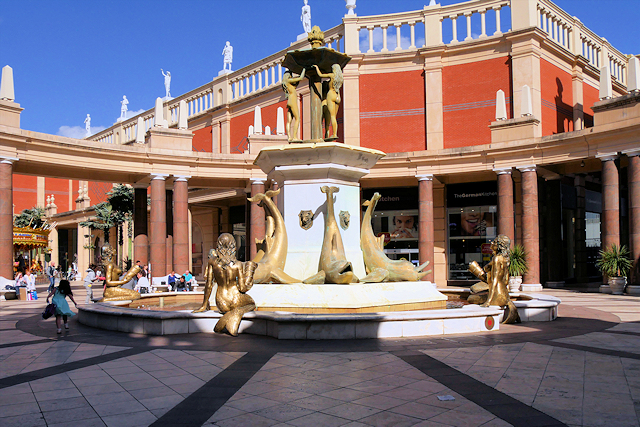
Barton Square in its original form prior to the redevelopment work

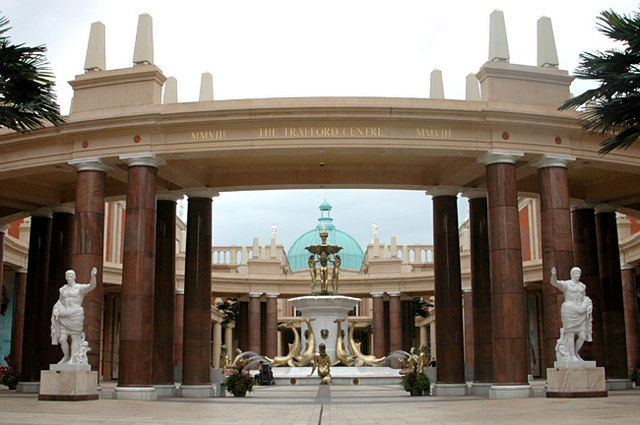
Barton Square in 2009 before the new level & roof was added

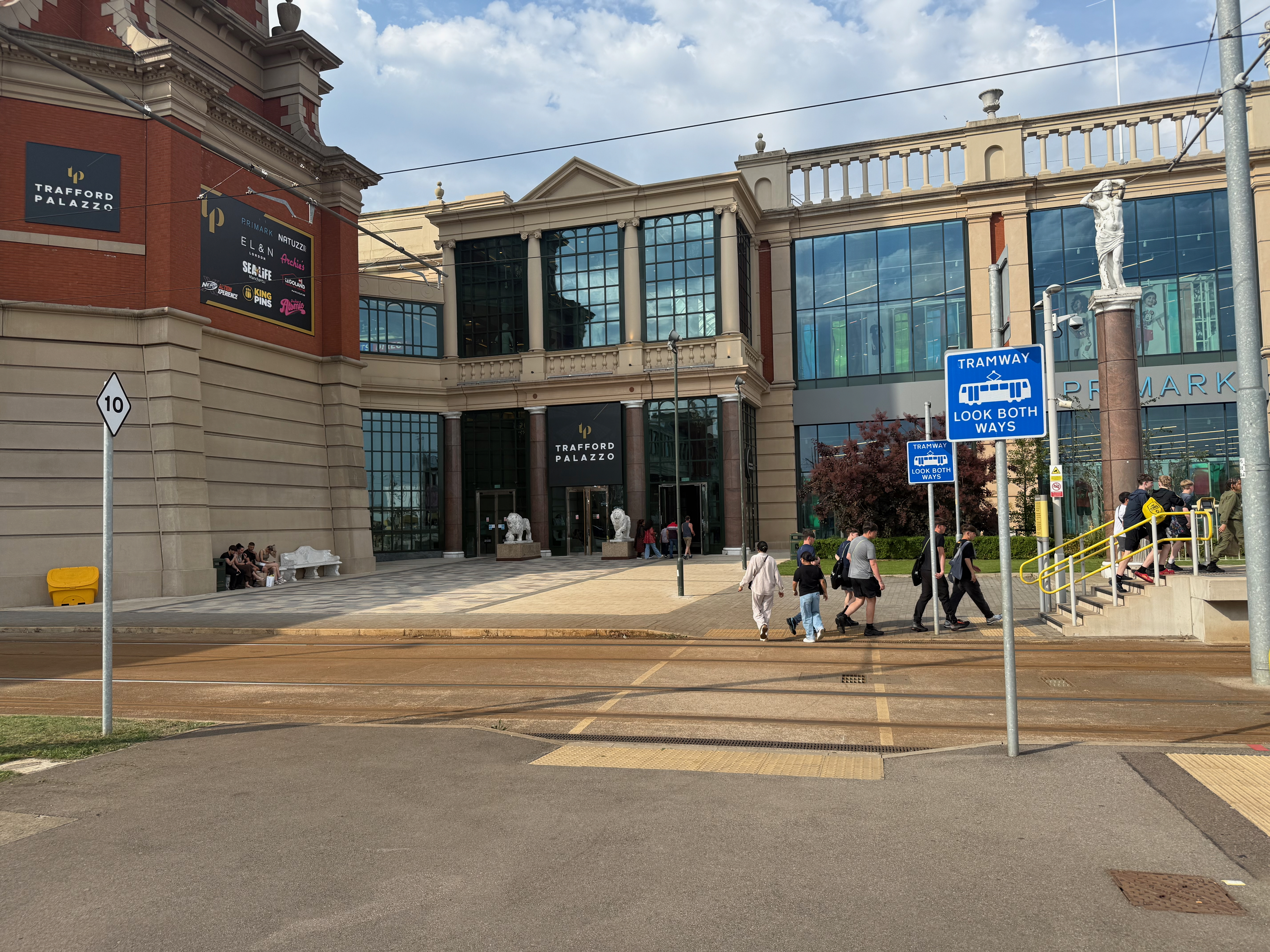
The Barton Dock Road entrance to Trafford Palazzo

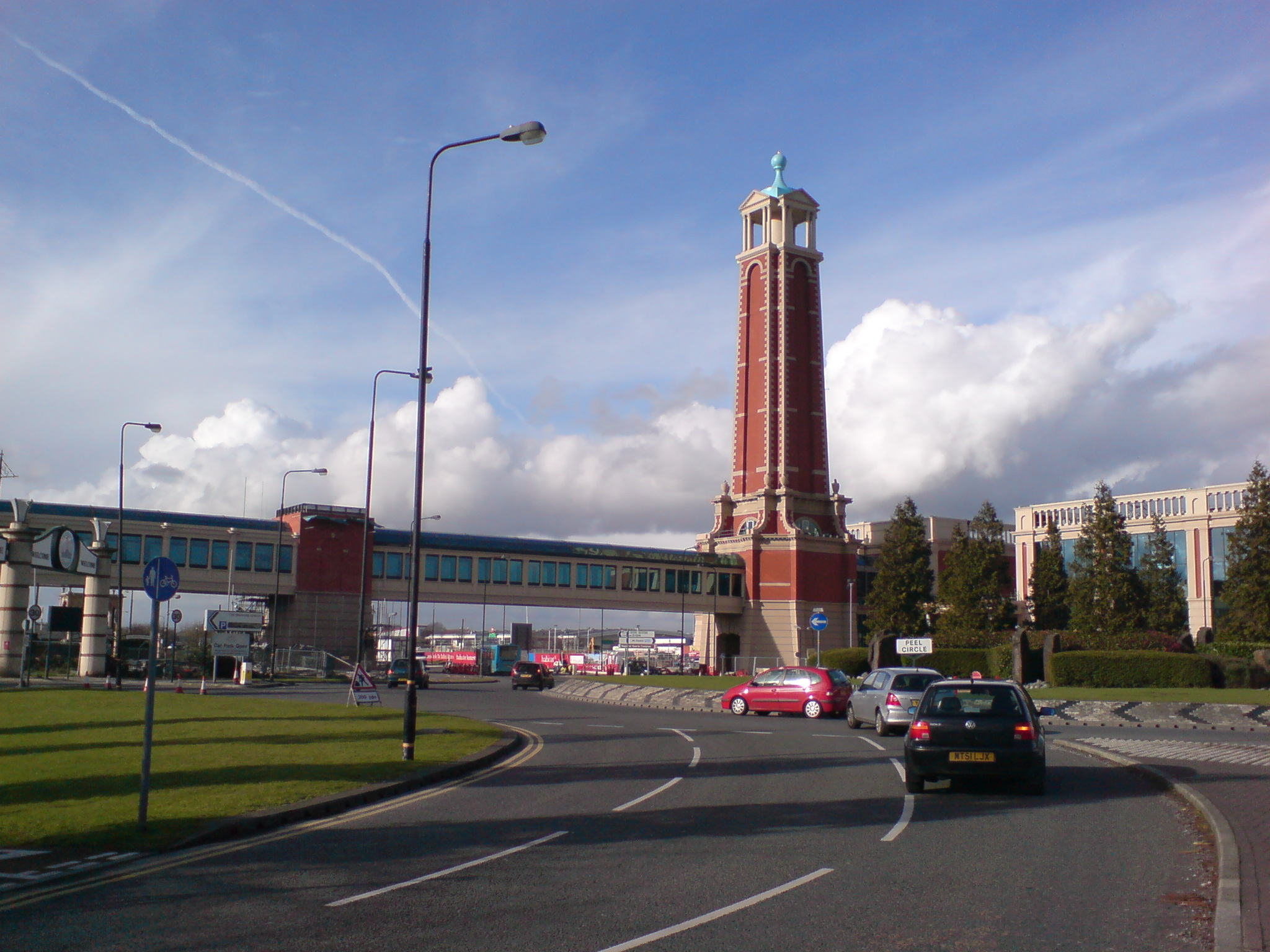
The Trafford Palazzo campanile tower and link bridge to The Trafford Centre

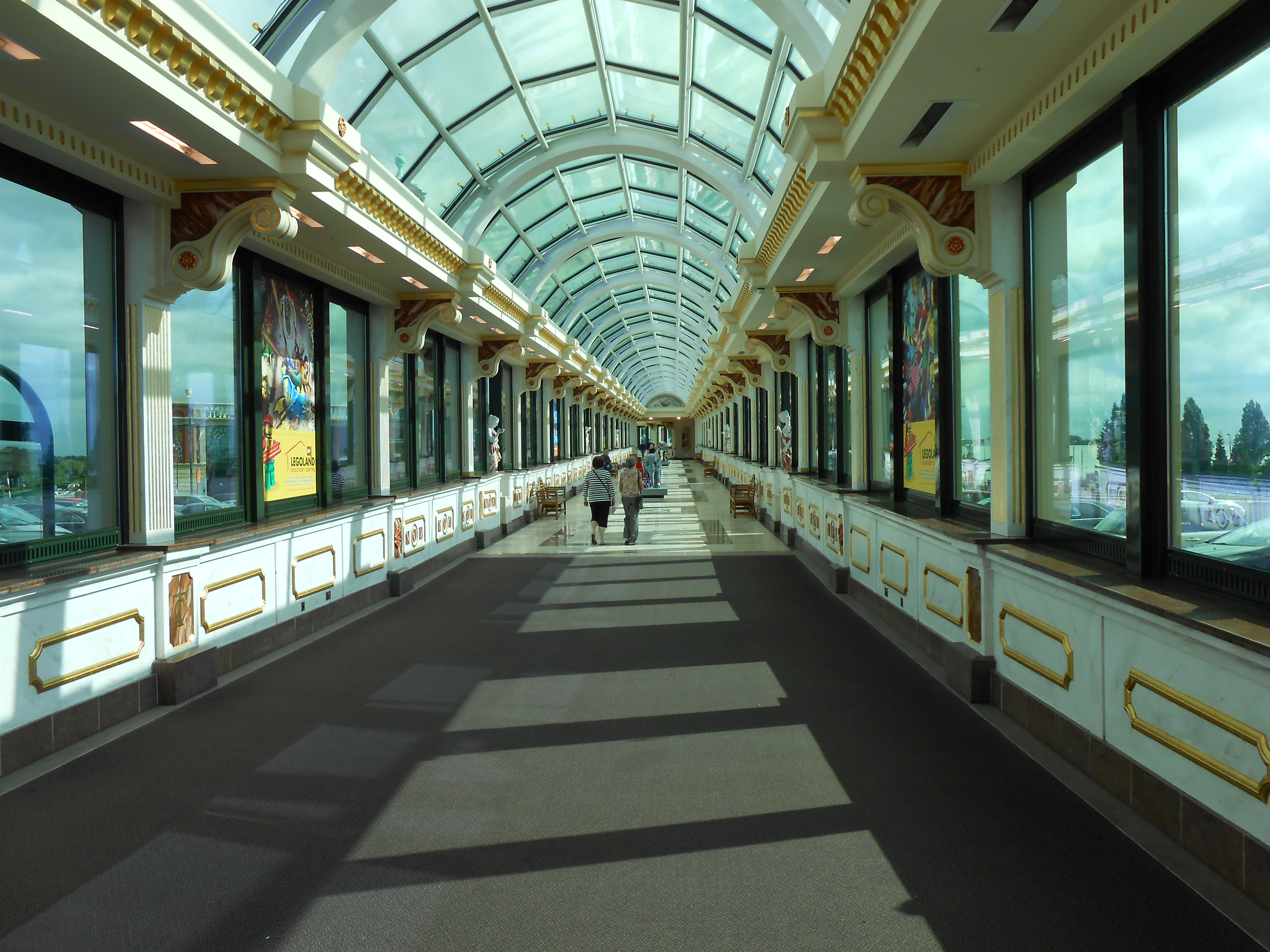
The glazed bridge linking Trafford Palazzo to The Trafford Centre

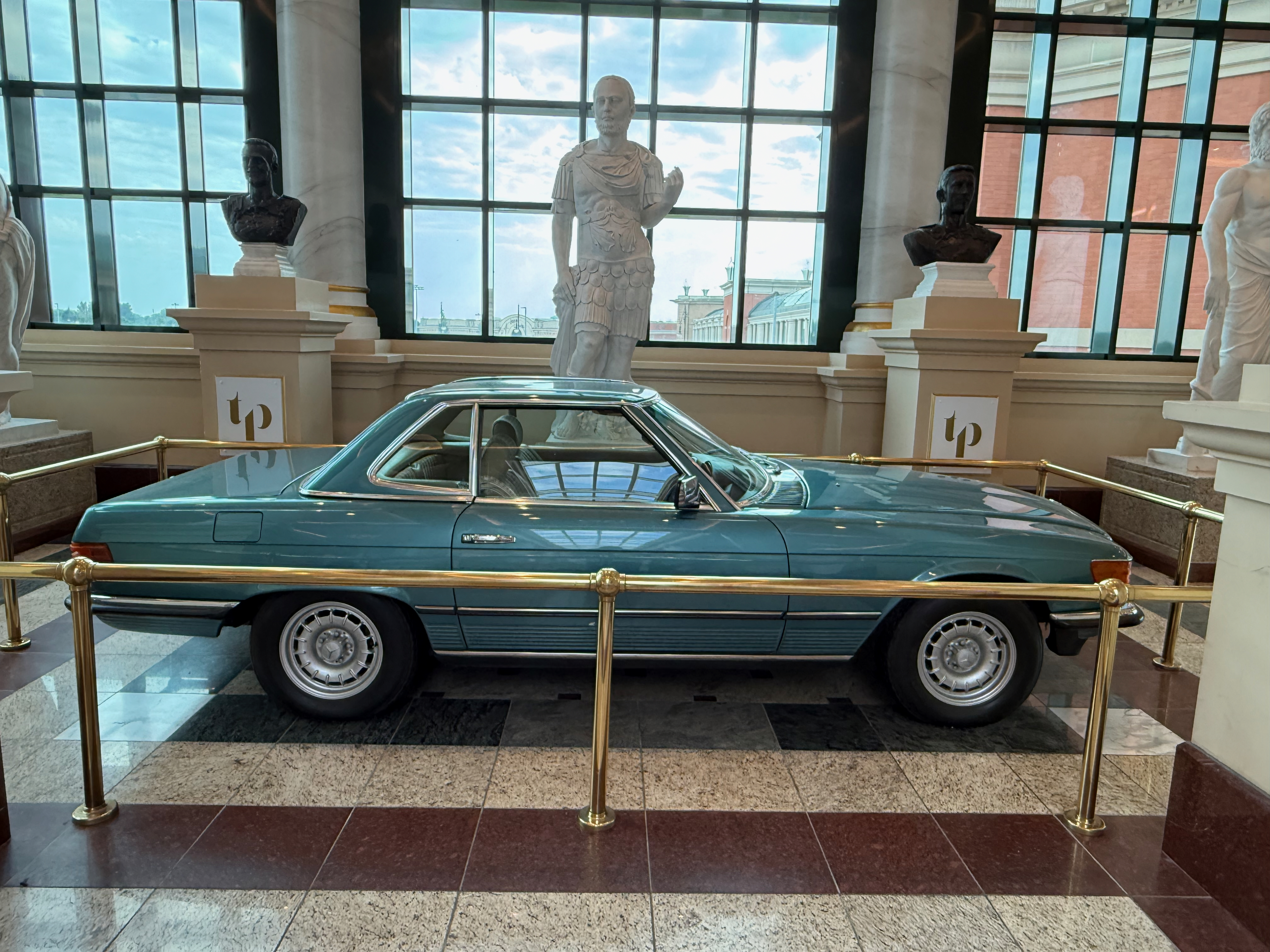
The Mercedes 380SL which formerly belonged to John Whitaker's mother and was formerly displayed at The Trafford Centre

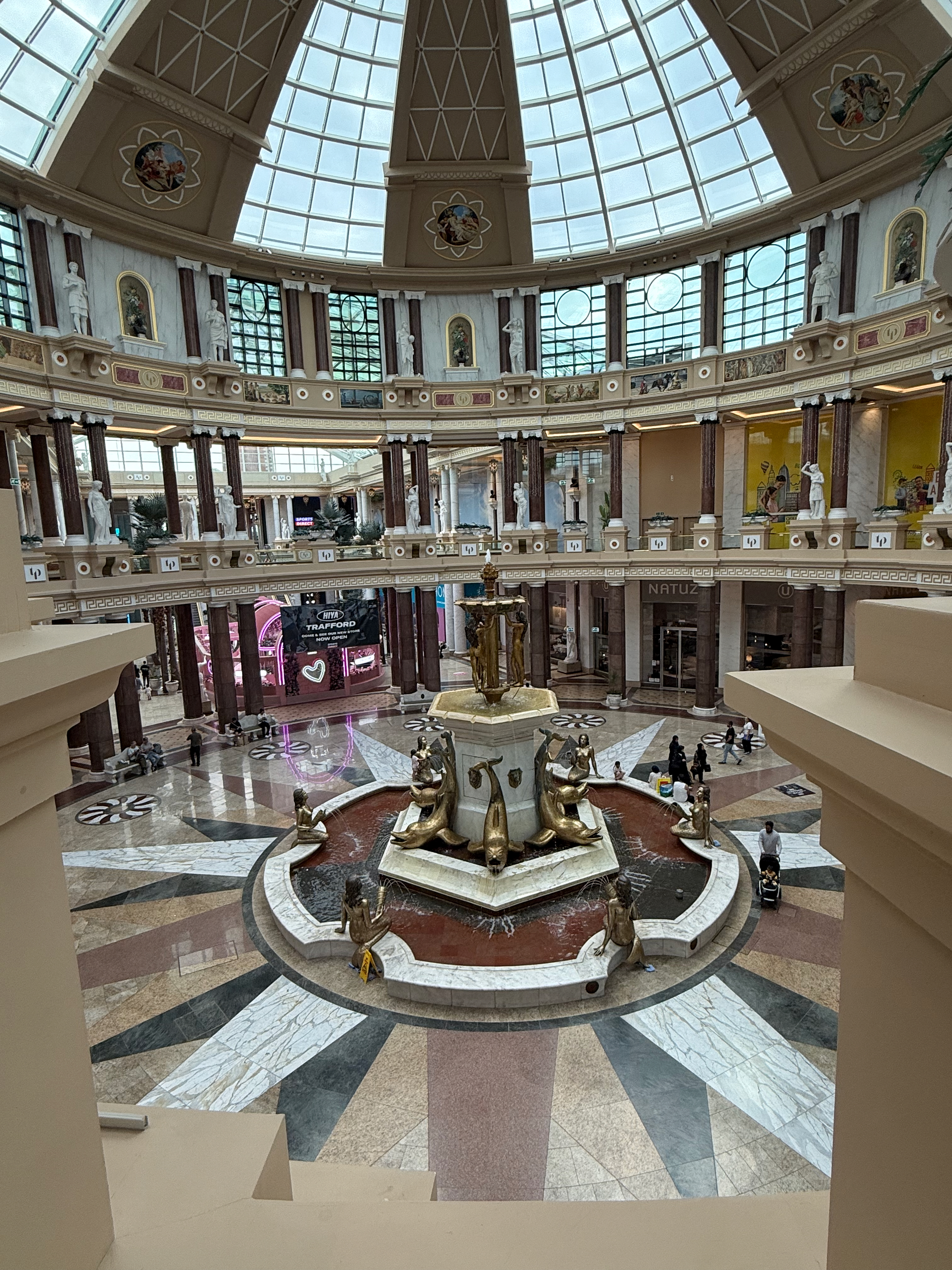
A view from the first floor in the main dome area

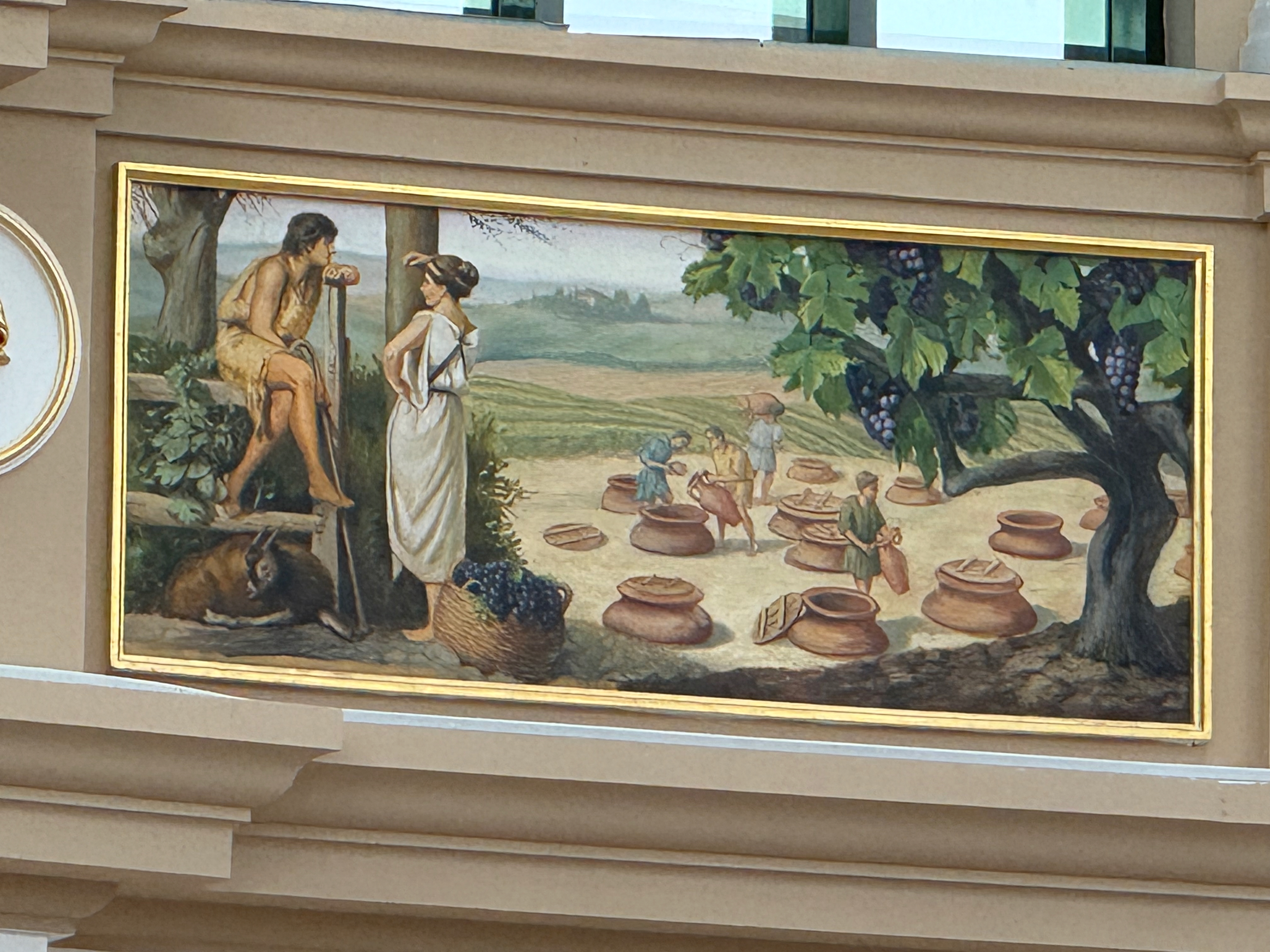
A mural depicting a scene of roman wine making

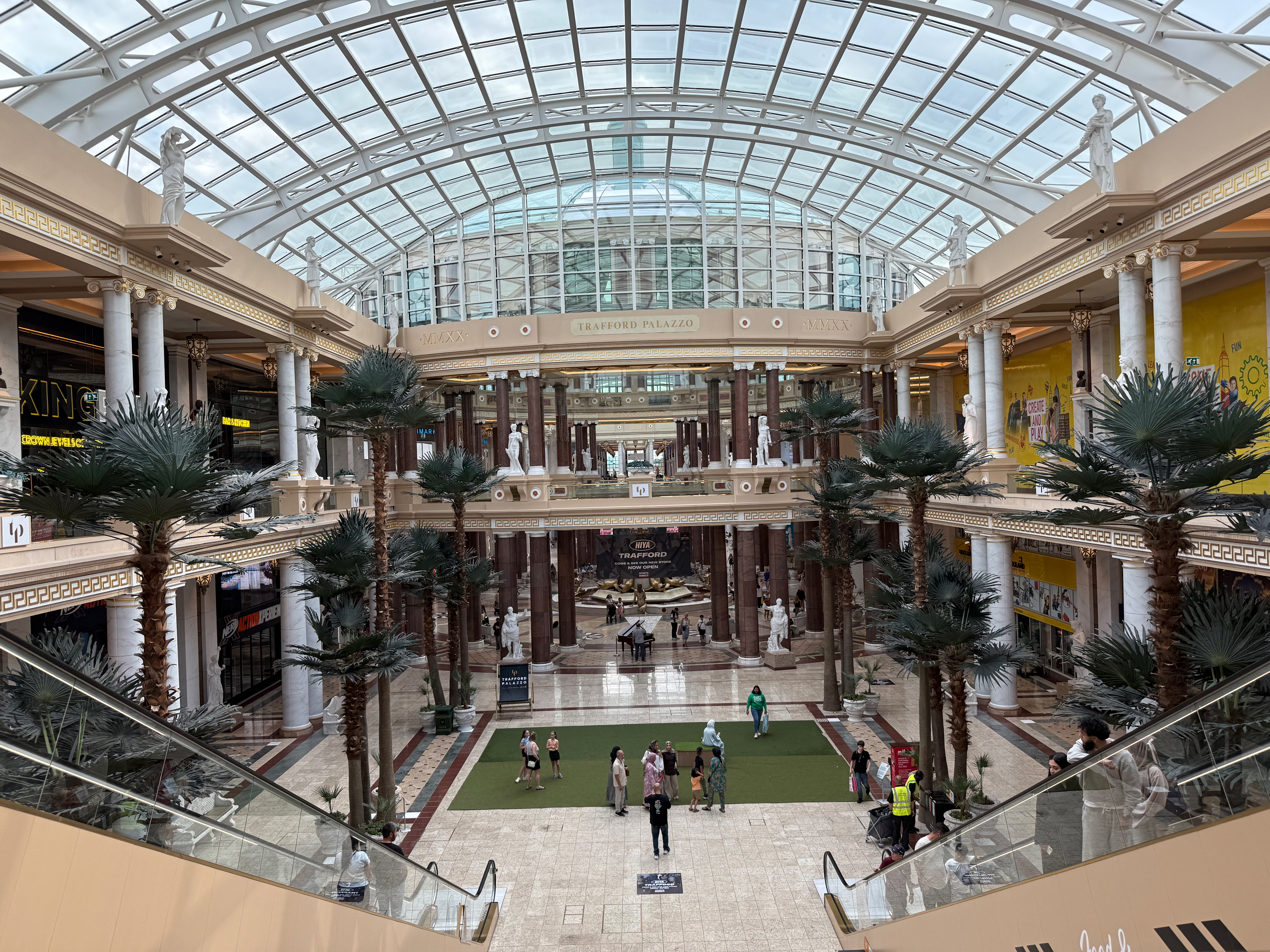
A view of Trafford Palazzo from the first floor

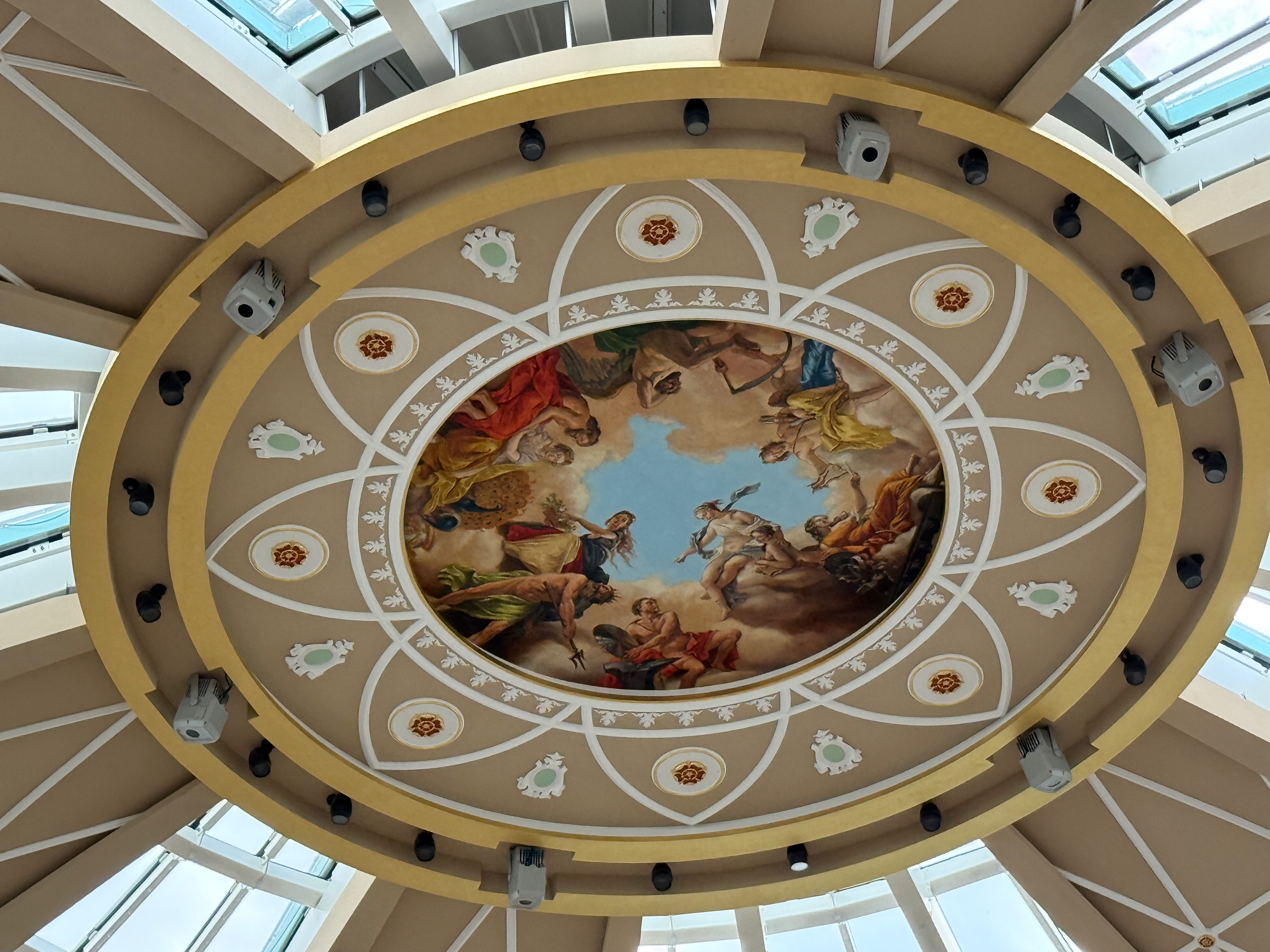
A view of the boss in the main dome which contains a trompe l'oeil depicting the roman gods
