= Therme Erding =

Largest thermal bath complex in Europe

Thermenwelt Erding
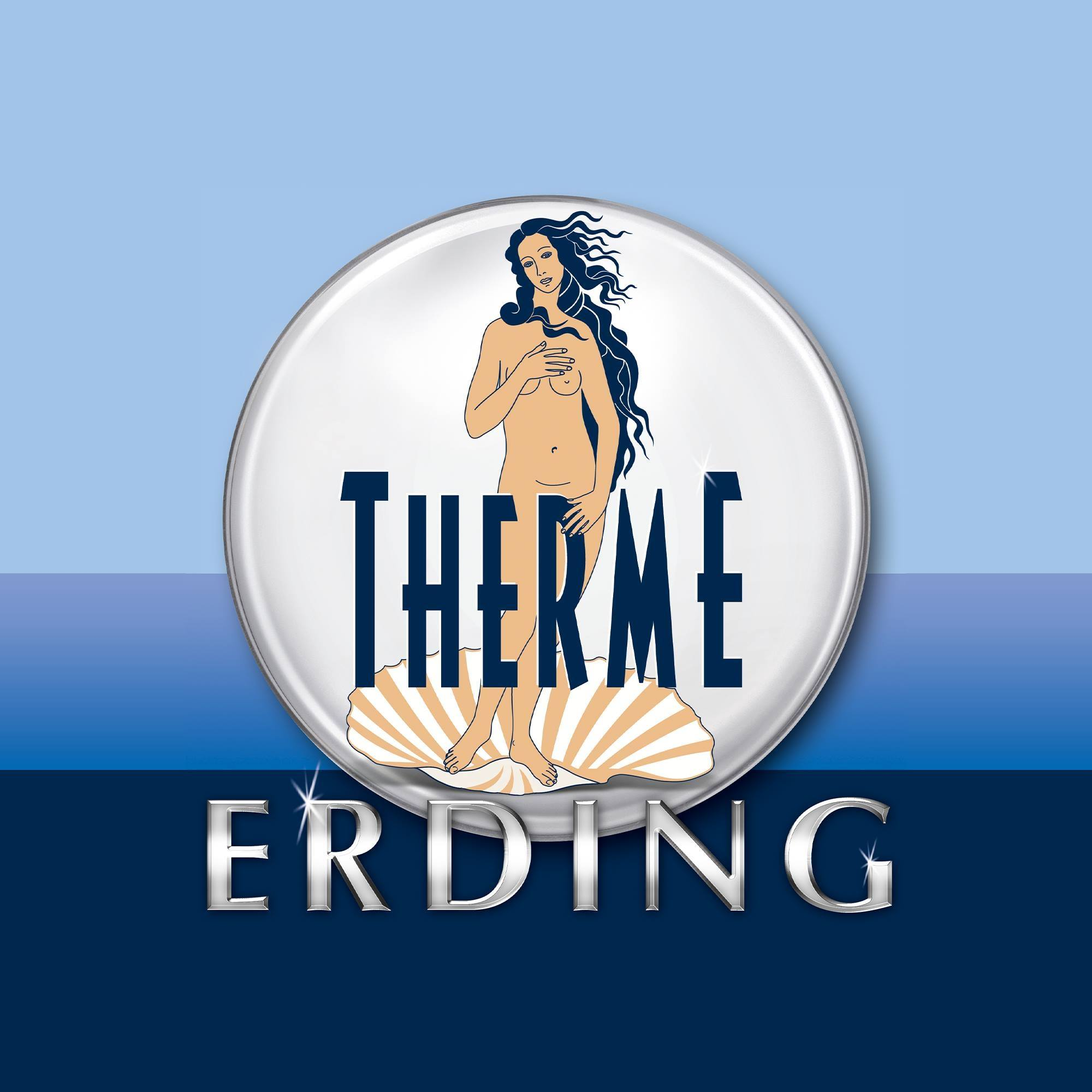

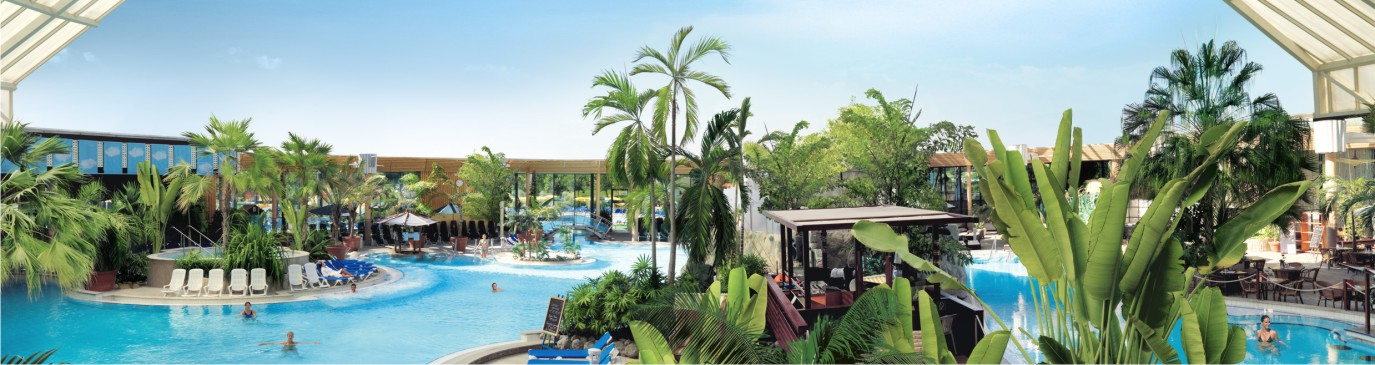
- Spa area interior
- Interactive map of Thermenwelt Erding
- Location: Thermenallee, Erding, Germany
- Coordinates: 48°17′25″N 11°53′12″E
- Status: Operating
- Opened: 20 March 1958; 68 years ago
- Attendance: 1.85 million (2019)
- Area: 43 ha (0.43 km^{2}; 110 acres)
- Website: https://www.therme-erding.de/en/

Therme Erding is the largest thermal bath complex in Europe, supporting a wide variety of activities. It is 30 minutes northeast of Munich by car and is visited by around 4,000 people every day.

== History ==
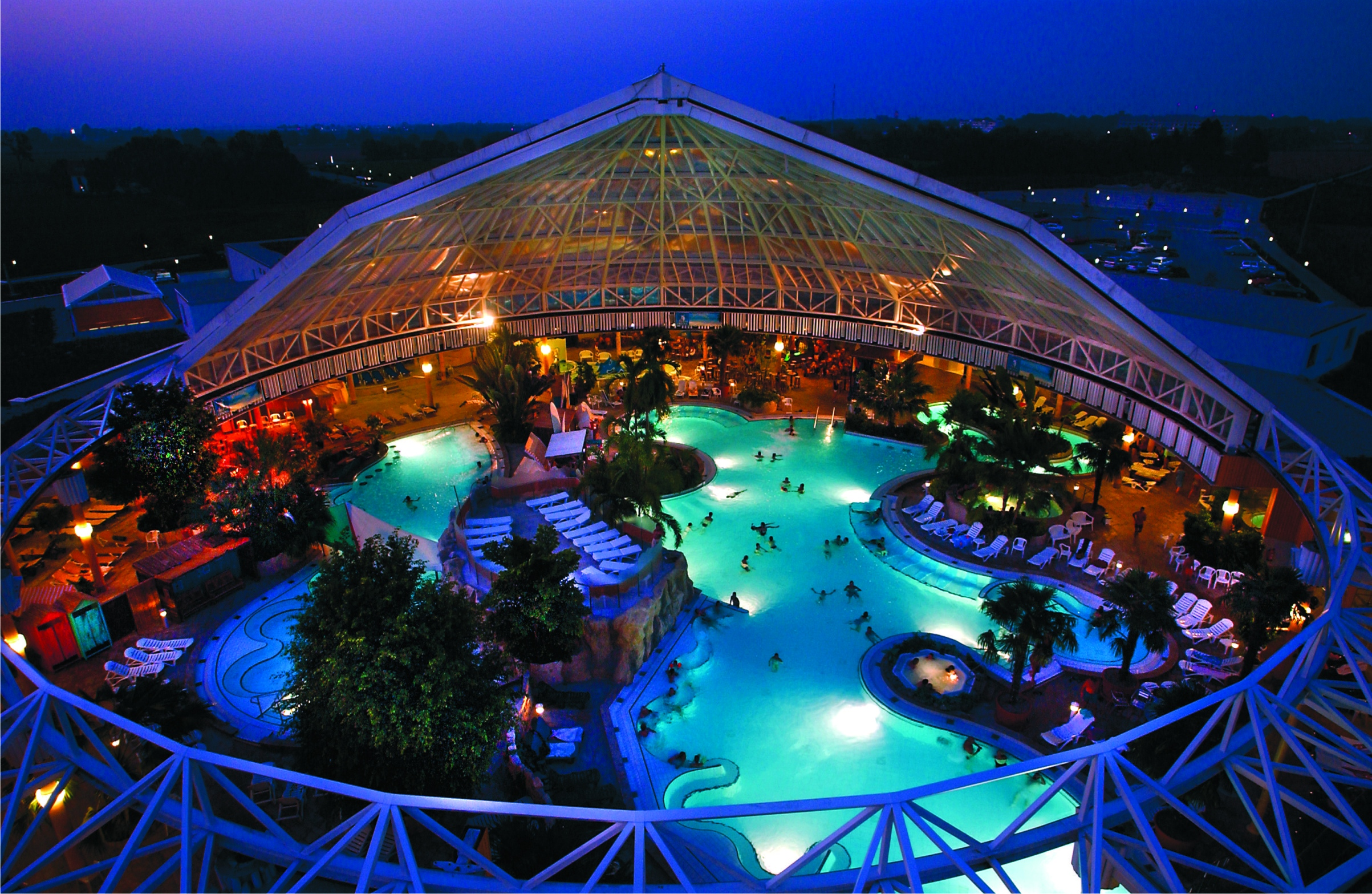
Sauna, thermal pools, and Stonehenge

On 12 February 1983, the American oil company Texaco drilled 2,350 metres (7,710 ft) below ground, just outside the town of Erding, Bavaria, Germany. Instead of oil, they discovered sulfurous water. Initially a 'mini thermal bath complex' was constructed on the site, and then the foundation stone of Therme Erding was finally laid on 10 November 1998, and it was officially opened on 3 October 1999. The complex has a clothed bathing area, and a no-clothing sauna section. In 2007, Therme Erding underwent an expansion.

On 31 March 2007, the waterslide section "Galaxy" opened, making it one of the biggest indoor waterslide parks in Europe. The newly expanded "Saunaparadies" reopened the same day which, with an area of 12,900 square metres (139,000 sq ft), became the largest sauna complex in the world. Both these extensions meant that Therme Erding more than doubled in size, increasing from 70,000 to 145,000 square metres (750,000 to 1,560,000 sq ft). A section of the old sauna area was named the "Vital-Oase", and is now designated only for clothed use. The exclusive beauty section "Royal Day Spa" has been open since 1 March 2009. It also has an adjoining hotel connected to the complex. More than €100 million has been invested in the park since its inauguration, and more than 600 jobs have been created.

== Sections ==
The baths contain four distinct areas: the waterslide area "Galaxy", the "Thermenparadies", the "Vital-Oase" and the "Saunaparadies".

=== Galaxy ===
The waterslide park "Galaxy" is covered by a 25-metre (82 ft) high metal dome, which can be half-opened in the summer months. There are 20 waterslides, one of which is the 2nd longest tube slide in Europe at 281 meters long. The slides are divided into three different levels of difficulty: "Family", "Action", and "X-Treme".

Huge expansion work took place in 2012, to the east of the current "Galaxy" (towards Altenerding), adding ten new slides with a combined length of over 2,750 metres (9,020 ft).

=== Thermenparadies ===
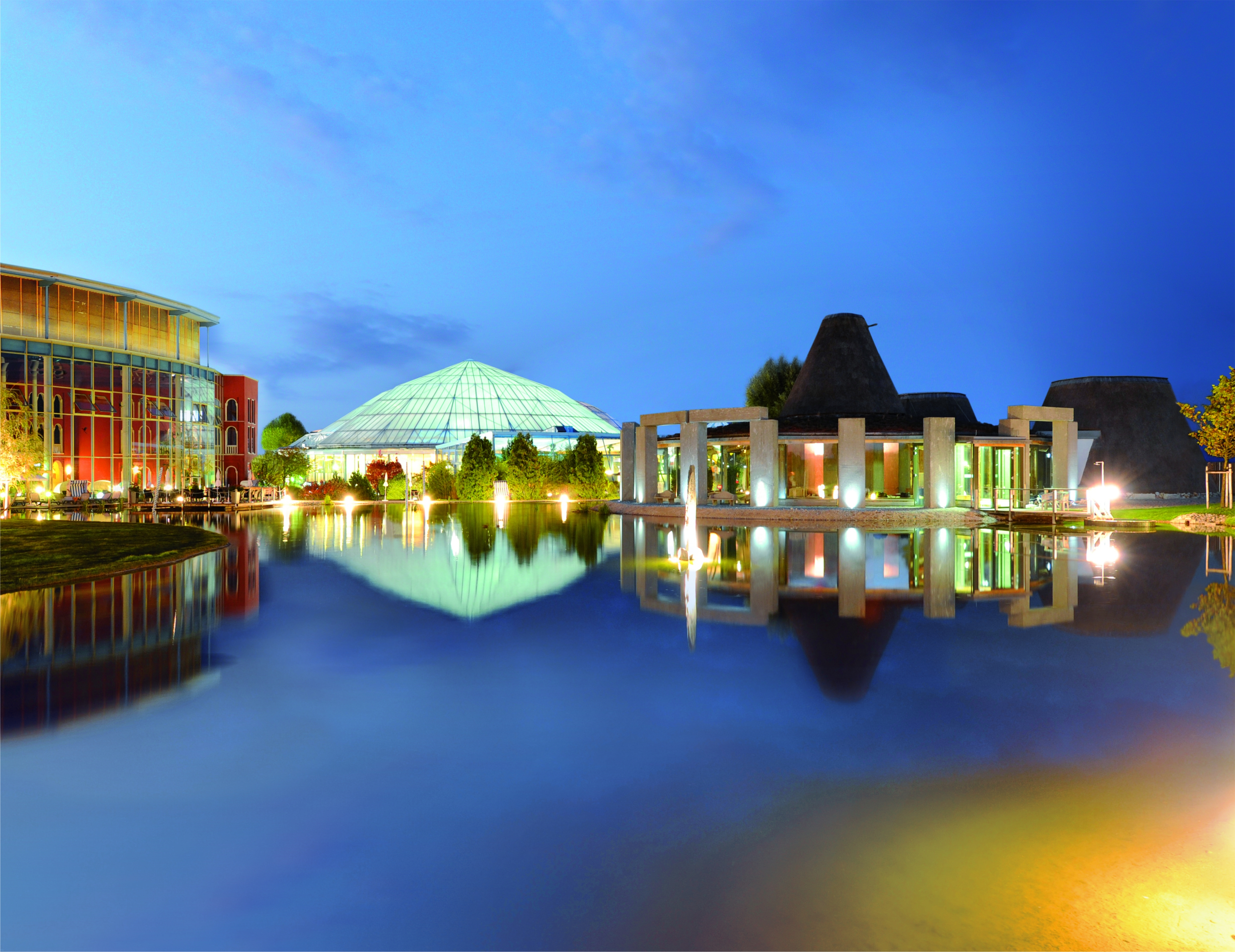
Exterior view of Thermenparadies

The "Thermenparadies" has a surface area of 27,500 square metres (296,000 sq ft) (9,000 square metres (97,000 sq ft) interior and 18,500 square metres (199,000 sq ft) thermal gardens). The interior is covered by a glass dome which can be half-opened in the summer months.

The interior is stands out, with a 1,450 square metres (15,600 sq ft) spa pool, pool bar, grotto, waterfall, neck showers, massage jets, Jacuzzi beds and current channels. Quiet rooms, a massage area, health baths, a steam room, bio-sauna, children's area and a restaurant are all located around the pool. The thermal garden is home to an outside pool which joins directly to the large indoor spa pool, with massage beds as well as sulfur mineral springs, a sandy beach, beach bar, beach volleyball pitch, and outdoor slides.

=== Vital-Oase ===
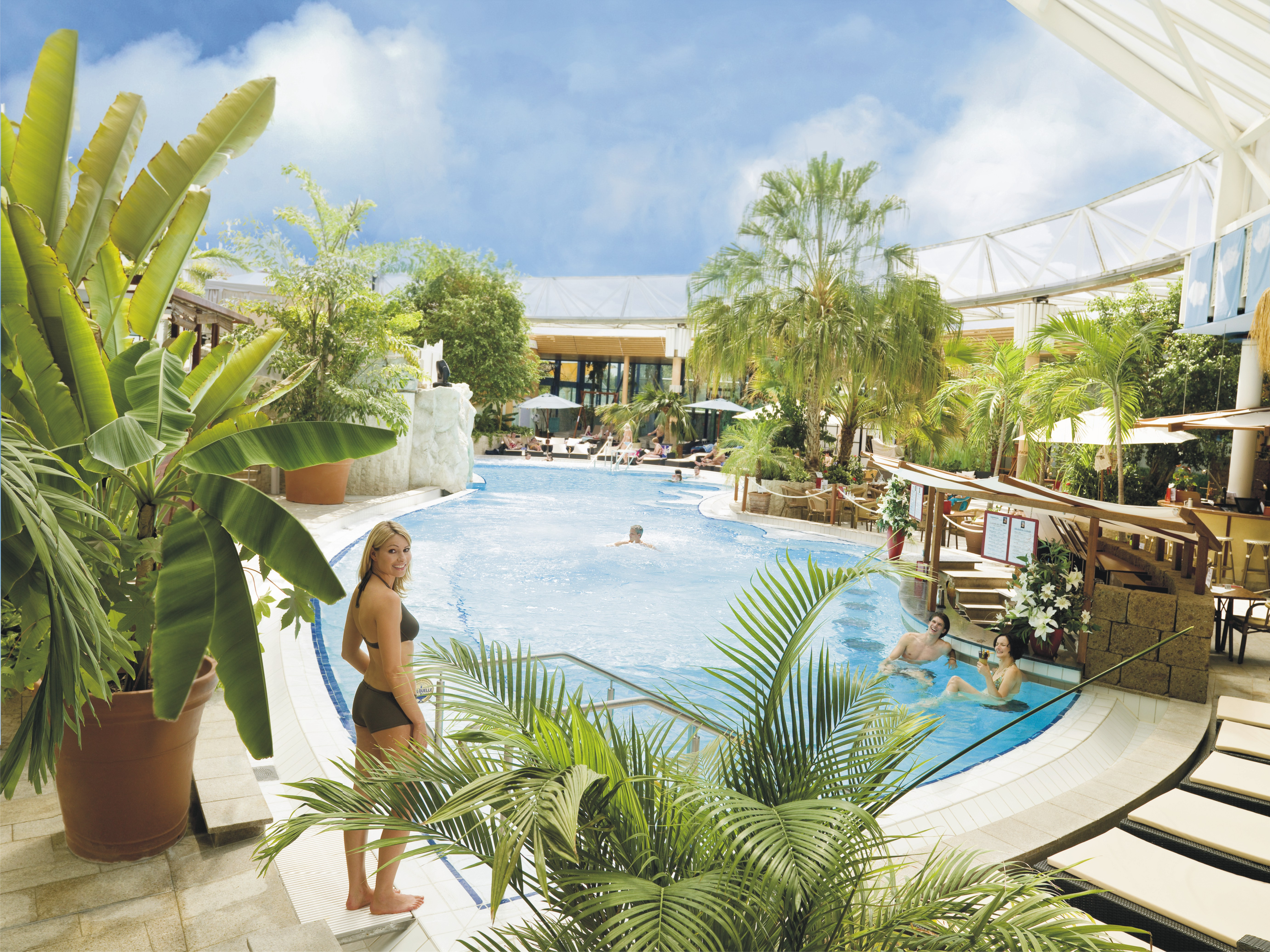
VitalOase

The Vital-Oase is available only for the use of those aged 16 or over. There is a spa pool with a pool bar, a sulfur mineral spring, clothed saunas, quiet rooms and a restaurant. In September 2008, three health pools were opened, which are enriched with minerals from the Dead Sea, such as selenium and calcium.

=== Saunaparadies ===
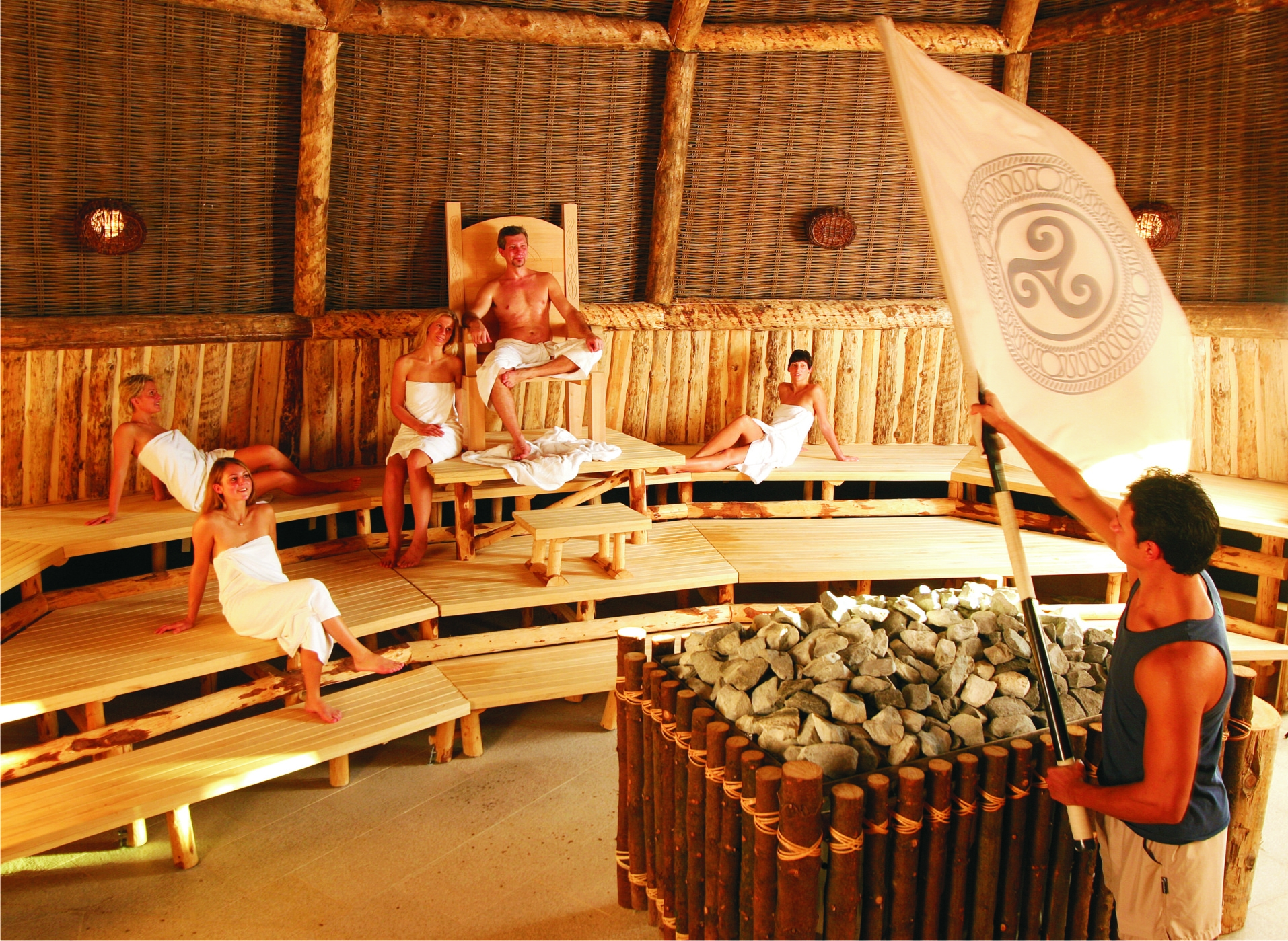
Keltenthron Sauna

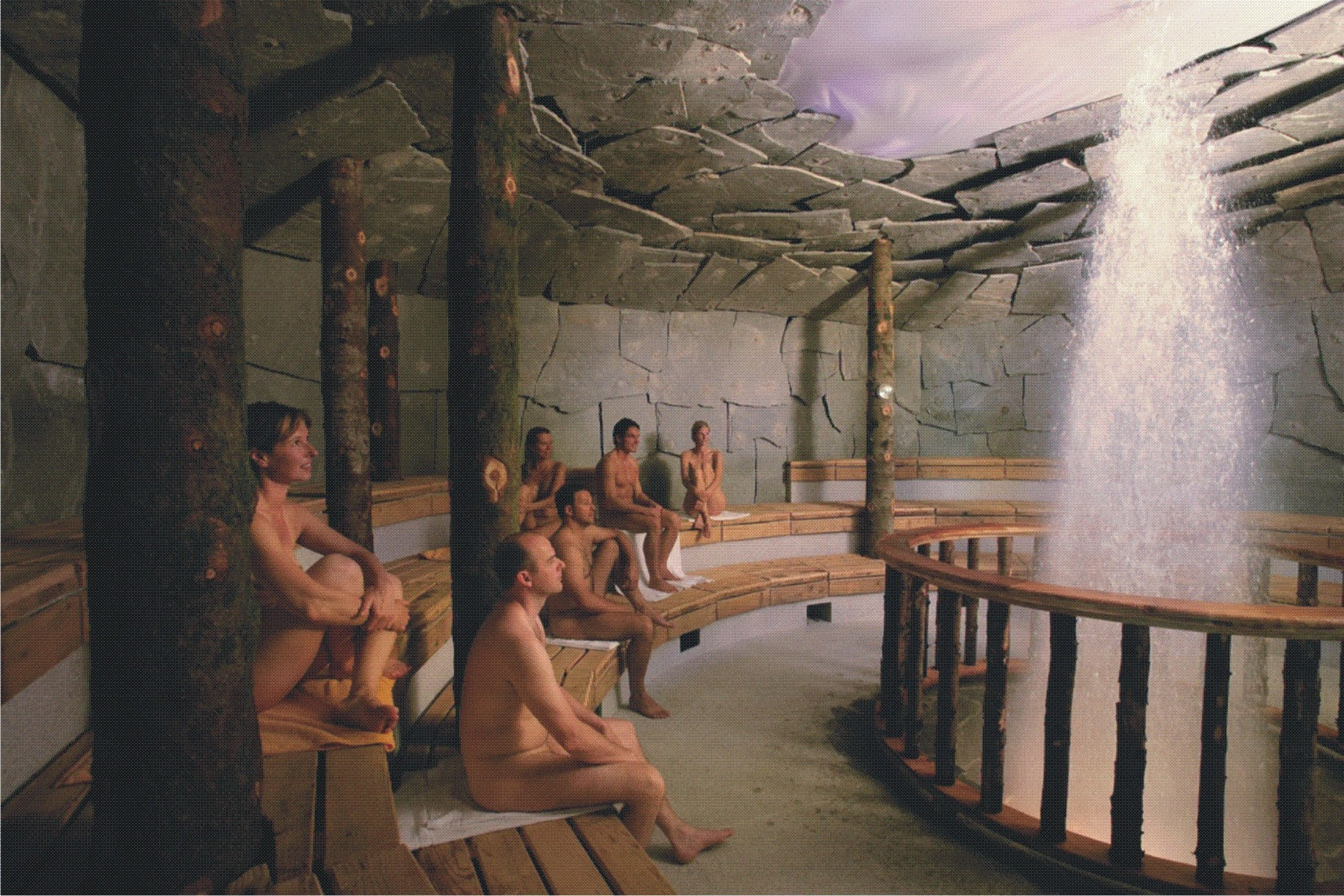
Geysirhöhle

The nudist sauna complex, available only for the use of those over the age of 16, offers 35 different saunas, two steam rooms, and multiple beauty treatment parlours in an area of 26,900 square metres (290,000 sq ft) (12,900 square metres (139,000 sq ft) interior and 14,000 square metres (150,000 sq ft) sauna garden).

The Saunaparadies's main building lies beneath a 60-by-40-metre (200 by 130 ft) large glass roof which can be fully opened in nice weather. In this building there are Jacuzzi beds, a 1,200 square metres (13,000 sq ft), 34 °C (93 °F) swimming pool, whirlpools, neck showers, and other outside pools. The outer pool is surrounded by three external saunas and the sauna lake. Of the rest, seven saunas are located in the main building, along with a meditation pool and a ladies-only area.

The main building is connected by the Palazzo Veneziano to the old sauna area, which houses both saunas and another outer pool with Jacuzzi beds. In the sauna garden there are two other saunas.

== Accidents ==
The sports equipment at Therme Erding is tested at regular intervals by the TÜV. However, often due to misconduct, there have been significant injuries, leading to broken bones and two disjointed fingers. The majority of injuries have tended to be due to non-compliance with prescribed and clearly advertised safety instructions. Wider media coverage was attracted by the case of a 16-year-old boy who injured himself on a bouncy castle outside. The business regulator and the police found no evidence of negligence by Therme Erding. Several lawsuits have been filed against Therme Erding following accidents. Most cases are quickly dismissed, but in one it was ruled that Therme Erding pay monetary compensation.

== Awards ==
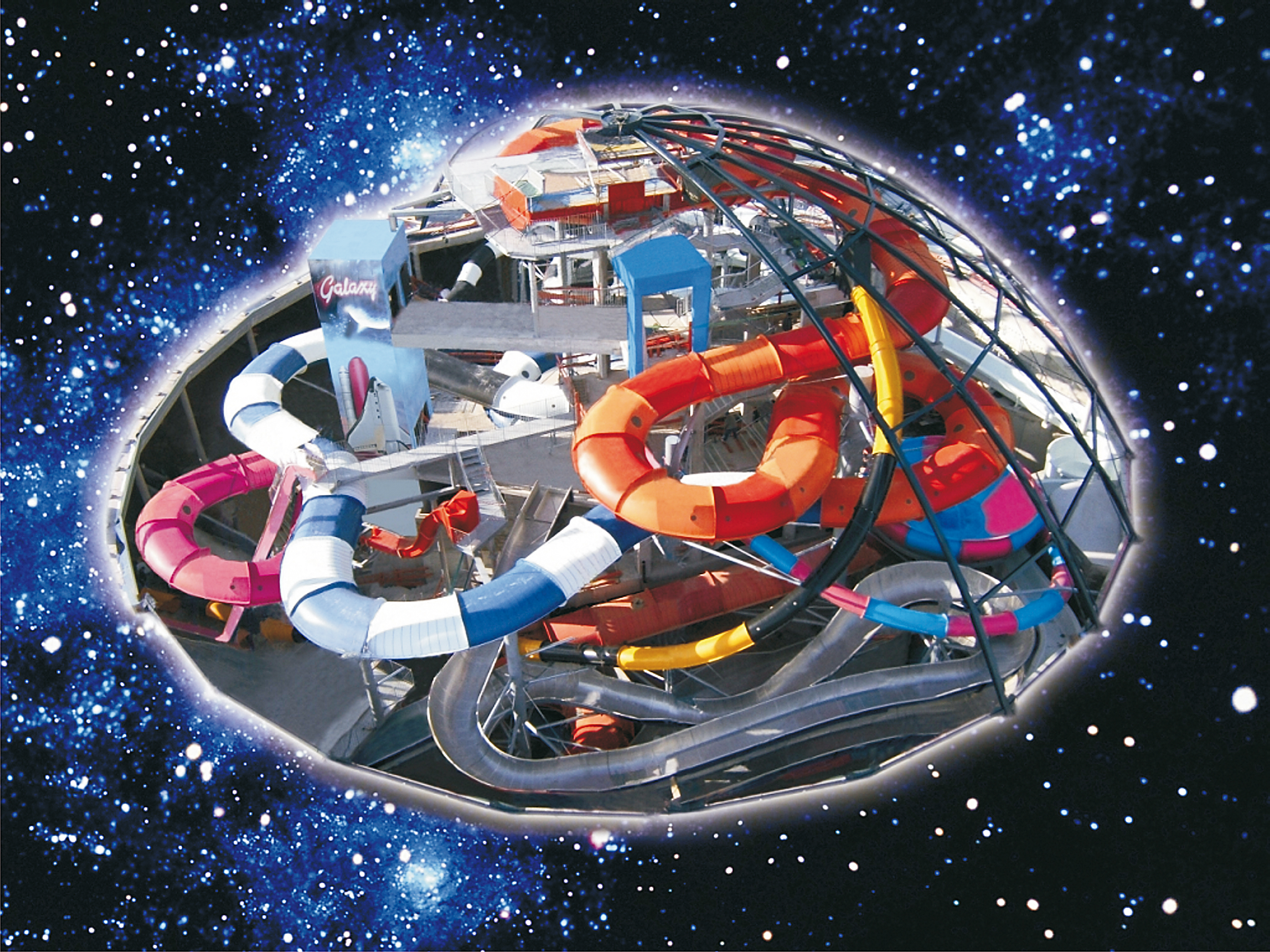
Galaxy Rutschenwelt

Therme Erding was awarded a mark of 1.6 as a result of thermal bath testing, in which 22 thermal baths across Germany were examined.

The sauna complex was decreed a "Premium Sauna" on 5 February 2009 by the German Sauna Federation.

Therme Erding/Galaxy Erding won in 2007/8, 2008/9 and 2009/10 the public "Parkscout" award as the best thermal bath experience.

== Events ==
Various events take place in Therme Erding. The slides are often used for German sliding championships, while in "Galaxy" there are often parties featuring famous DJs. Once a month there are themed evenings in the Sauna and Thermeparadies.

== Transport ==
Therme Erding is in the south of Erding on the B388. It can be reached on the A9 (exit Garching-Süd), A94 (exit 10 Erding/Anzing) or the A92 (exit Erding). The station Altenerding is nearby with connections to the S2, which runs between Erding and Petershausen via Munich. The buses 550, 560, 570 and 580 also operate to the stop called "Therme Erding".
