= Mühldorf (Oberbay) station =

Railway station in Bavaria, Germany

Mühldorf (Oberbay)
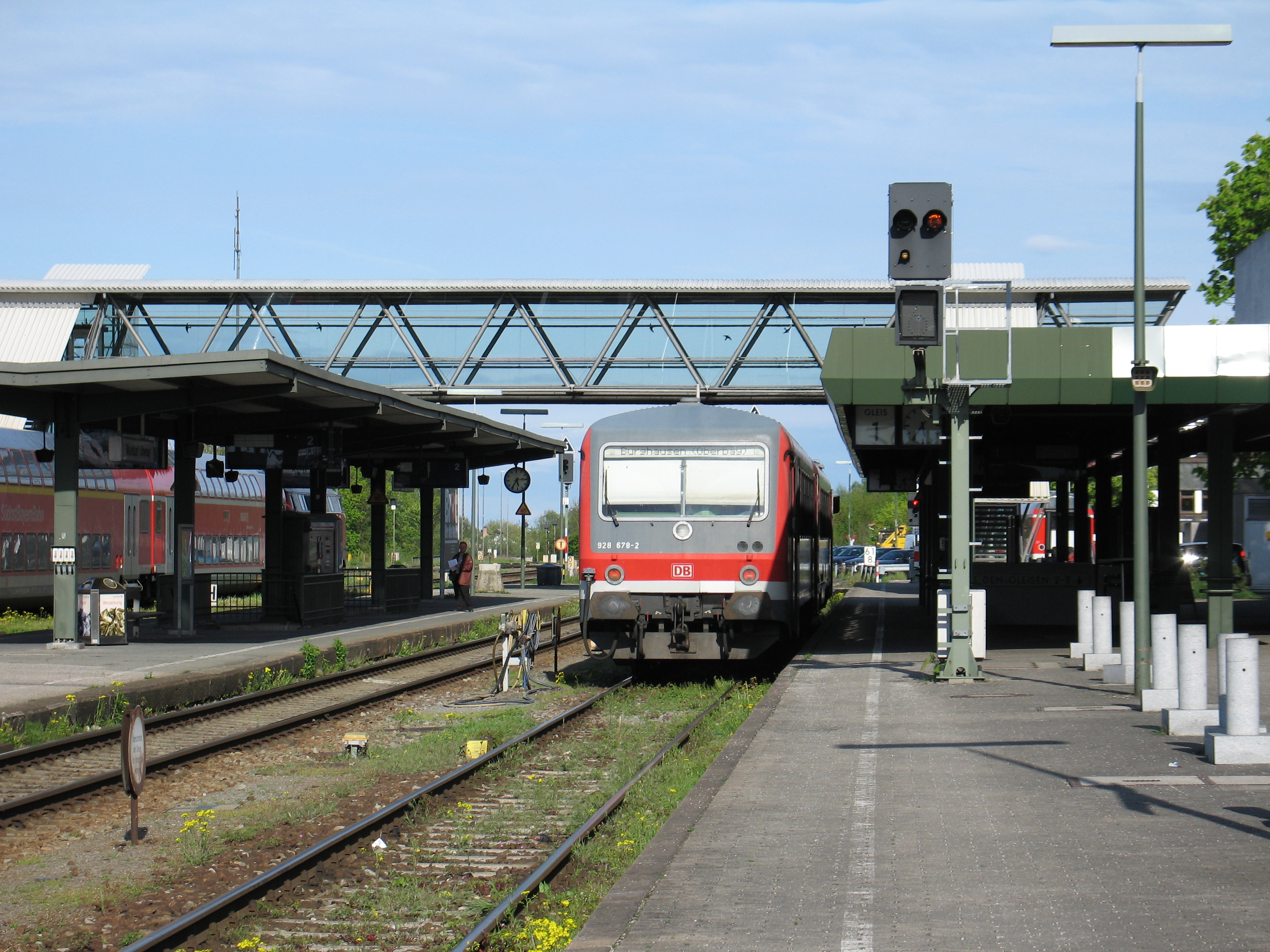
- Class 628 on the "home" platform

General information
- Location: Mühldorf am Inn, Bavaria; Germany
- Coordinates: 48°14′53″N 12°31′11″E
- Lines: Munich–Mühldorf (km 74.8) (KBS 940); Mühldorf–Simbach (km 74.8) (KBS 941); Mühldorf–Burghausen (km 0.0) (KBS 942); Mühldorf–Rosenheim (km 61.7) (KBS 944); Mühldorf–Neumarkt Sankt-Veit (km 61.7) (KBS 945, 946); Mühldorf–Freilassing (km 0.0) (KBS 945, 947)
- Platforms: 7

Construction
- Accessible: Yes

Other information
- Station code: n/a
- DS100 code: MMF
- IBNR: 8000258
- Category: 4
- Website: stationsdatenbank.de; www.bahnhof.de

History
- Opened: 1 May 1871

Passengers
- 1000

Services
Preceding station		Following station
Dorfen Bahnhof towards München Hbf	RE 4 Limited service	Töging (Inn) towards Simbach (Inn)
Ampfing towards München Hbf	RB 40	Terminus
Terminus	RB 41	Töging (Inn) towards Simbach (Inn)
Terminus	RB 42	Tüßling towards Burghausen (Oberbay)
Neumarkt-St. Veit towards Landshut (Bayern) Hbf	RB 44	Waldkraiburg-Kraiburg towards Rosenheim
Neumarkt-St. Veit towards Landshut (Bayern) Hbf	RB 45	Tüßling towards Salzburg Hbf
Terminus	RB 46	Rohrbach (Oberbay) towards Passau Hbf
Terminus	RB 47	Tüßling towards Traunstein
Location

Mühldorf (Oberbayern) station is a railway junction and station in the district town of Mühldorf in the German state of Bavaria. The station has seven platform tracks and is classified by Deutsche Bahn as a category 4 station. The station is served by 105 passenger trains each day operated by the Südostbayernbahn and frequented by about 10,000 travellers. It is also the central station of the “Bavarian Chemical Triangle” (Bayerisches Chemiedreieck). About 800 freight wagons are dispatched from it daily.

== Location ==
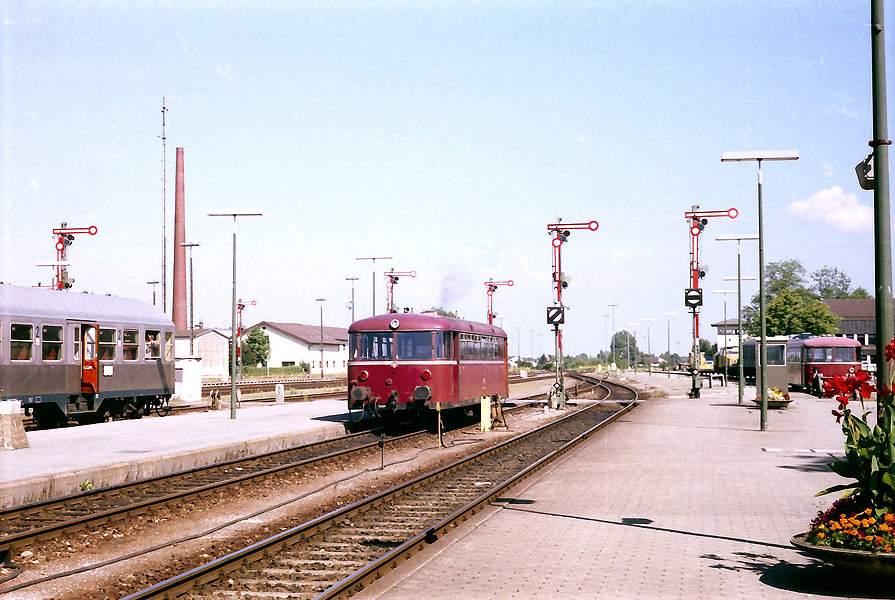
Railbus on its way to the depot

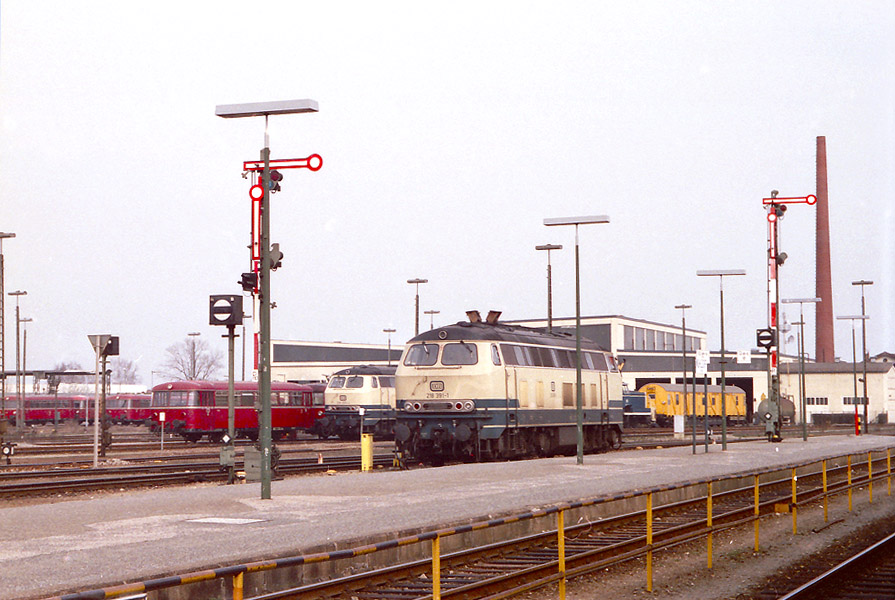
Looking towards Mühldorf deopt with 218 391-1 and Railbuses in the background

The station is located north of the centre of Mühldorf in the so-called “Upper Town” (Oberen Stadt). The station area is bordered to the north by Bischof-von-Ketteler-Straße and to the south by Friedrich-Ebert-Straße. The two streets are connected by Innere Neumarkter Straße, which passes under an underpass under the tracks to the east of the station area. The station building is located to the south and has the address of Bahnhofplatz 6.

== History ==
Until 1860, Mühldorf was just a small town with just under 2,000 inhabitants. Only the railway connection would bring a substantial boost to its economy and its population. In the following years citizens' initiatives supporting the construction of a railway to Mühldorf were formed. Mühldorf at the time was in the so-called "rail-less square", the boundaries of this square were the cities of Salzburg, Rosenheim, Munich, Landshut and Passau. There had been different proposals for the construction of lines from Freilassing, Traunstein and Rosenheim to Regensburg or from Munich to Freilassing or Passau. The decision was finally made in favour of a route from Munich via Mühldorf and Simbach towards Austria, which would also relieve the existing Munich–Rosenheim–Salzburg line. A law of 5 October 1863 authorised the construction of a line from Munich to the Austrian border in Simbach. The decision to pass through Mühldorf was made later. Finally, an alignment via Markt Schwaben, Dorfen and Mühldorf was selected.

=== Construction and opening of the station ===
Construction was delayed by the Franco-Prussian War and Mühldorf station was finally opened on 1 May 1871 with the opening of the railway between Munich and Neuötting. The line was extended a month later to Simbach. Meanwhile, the Bavarian Eastern Railway planned a connection from Plattling to Rosenheim. Citizens' initiative committees were established and shortly before the inaugural of Mühldorf Gustav von Schlör (Bavarian Minister for Trade and Public Works 1866–71) was appointed an honorary citizen because of his support for the project, which would make Mühldorf station a railway junction. Mühldorf became a “separation station” (Trennungsbahnhof) on 1 May 1876, when the line to Rosenheim was opened. On 15 October 1875 was a connection was opened from Mühldorf via Neumarkt-Sankt Veit to Plattling. Traffic at junction station continued to grow during the coming years. It was originally planned that the newly opened railway lines would use the single platform next to the station building, but the railway tracks soon proved to be no longer sufficient. As a result, five platform tracks were established, two tracks for through freight and four terminating sidings for freight. A local freight yard was built opposite the station building. A locomotive shelter was built east of the station for the Bavarian Eastern Railway. The station was the starting point of further lines. A line was opened on 1 September 1879 from Neumarkt St. Veit to Pocking and it was extended to Passau in 1888. On 8 October 1883 this was followed by a line to Landshut, but this also branched in Neumarkt-Sankt Veit from the Mühldorf–Plattling line. A line to Altötting was completed on 1 May 1897. This was extended on 9 August to Burghausen to form the Mühldorf–Burghausen railway. The line to Freilassing was opened on 1 December 1908 as a connection to the Tauern Railway; it branched off the Burghausen line at a relocated Tüßling station. On 14 November 1910, the Traunstein–Garching railway was opened to Traunstein, branching off the Mühldorf–Freilassing line in Garching. The station facilities were upgraded in the years that followed. Freight traffic of great importance was also won in the 1930s as a result of the development of the Bavarian Chemical Triangle. Thus a new marshalling yard needed to be built. This was opened in 1942 as Germany's most modern yard. This was controlled by 11 electro-mechanical interlockings, which had been reduced to eight in 2000. One of these is now a museum signal box. Today, operation are controlled by an electronic interlocking.

The Frontenhausen-Marklkofen–Pilsting section of the Mühldorf Plattling railway was closed on 13 December 1969. Passenger services were closed on the Neumarkt-Sankt Veit–Frontenhausen-Marklkofen section on 27 September 1970. This section is still used by freight traffic.

In 1978, the old station building was demolished and replaced by a new one.

== Current operations ==
=== Infrastructure ===
In 2008, construction began on an upgrade of the station to make it barrier-free. But in 2009, it was interrupted by the European Union because the project was part of the development of the Munich–Mühldorf–Freilassing line, which is being partly funded by the EU, and it wanted to see the reconstruction plans. The EU then called for a partial redesign and the work restarted a year and a half later, in late 2010.

The platforms have been barrier-free since 2013. All platforms are equipped with digital train destination indicators. The station building is open to the public and it contains a ticket office, a kiosk and a waiting room.

The following table provides an overview of the length, height and usage of platforms:

Platform track	Length [m]	Height [cm]	Use
1	304	55	Regionalbahn services towards Rosenheim, Landshut, Freilassing and Salzburg
2	304	76	Regional-Express services towards Burghausen
3	304	76	Regionalbahn services towards Munich
4	276	55	Regionalbahn services towards Munich
5	276	55	Regionalbahn services towards Simbach am Inn
6	215	55	Regionalbahn services towards Freilassing and Landshut
7	215	55	Regionalbahn and Regional-Expresse services towards Passau

=== Lines ===
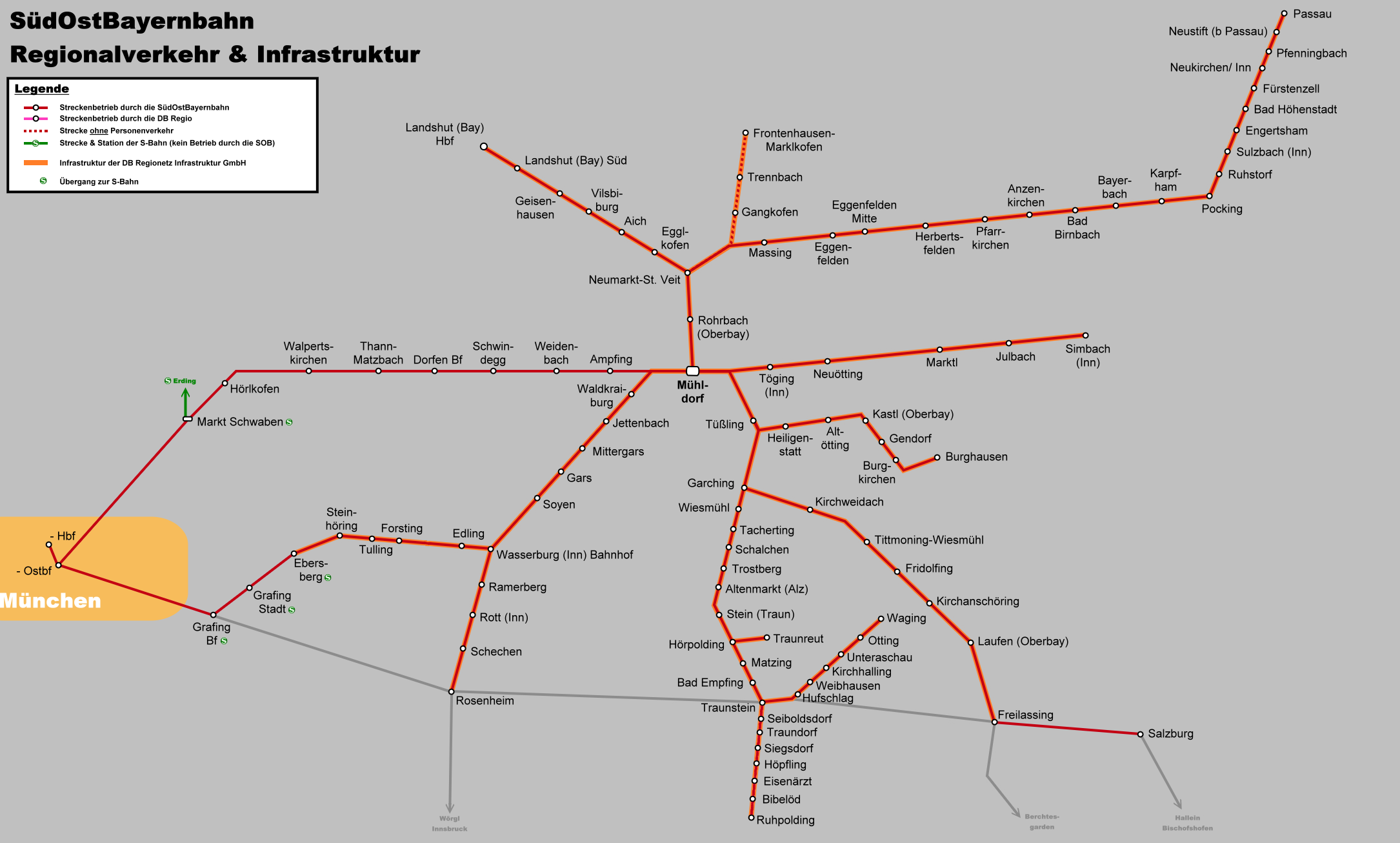
Map of the Südostbayernbahn network

The station is located in the centre of the so-called “Mühldorf line star” (Liniensterns Mühldorf), this is operated by one of the regional networks of Deutsche Bahn, the SüdostBayernBahn. The adjoining lines are operated with class 218 locomotives hauling double-deck or refurbished Silberling carriages or with class 628 railcars locomotives. Specifically, the lines are as follows:

- KBS 940 : Munich-Mühldorf (at km 74.8)
- KBS 941 : Mühldorf-Simbach (at km 74.8)
- KBS 942 : Mühldorf Burghausen (at km 18.7)
- KBS 944 : Mühldorf-Rosenheim (at km 61.7)
- KBS 945, KBS 946 : Mühldorf Neumarkt-Sankt-Veit (at km 61.7)
- KBS 945, KBS 947 : Mühldorf-Freilassing (at km 42.0)

=== Rail traffic ===
==== Passenger services ====
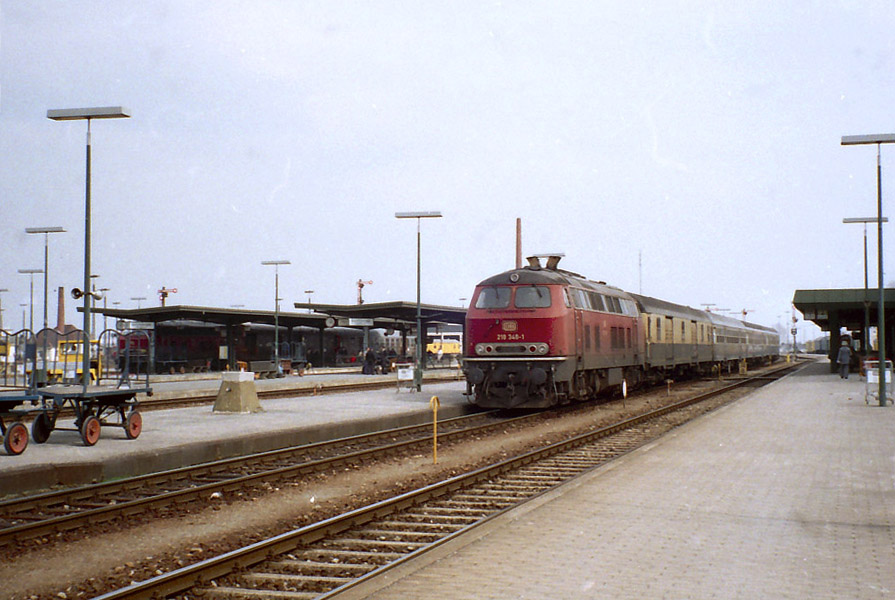
A fast train to Munich is ready to depart on platform 2

The station is served daily by about 105 SüdostBayernBahn services. Mühldorf station is served only by a few Regional-Express services on the Munich–Mühldorf–Simbach route. Hourly Regionalbahn services operate on the Munich–Mühldorf, Mühldorf–Burghausen, Mühldorf–Simbach and Munich–Passau routes. In addition, the station is served every two hours by Regionalbahn services on the Salzburg–Landshut and Rosenheim–Landshut lines. Individual Regionalbahn operate from Mühldorf to Trostberg, Traunreut and Traunstein.

Train class	Route	Interval
RE 4	Munich – Dorfen – Mühldorf (– Simbach)	Mon–Fri: 3 pairs of trains
RB 40	Munich – Markt Schwaben – Dorfen – Mühldorf	Hourly
RB 41	Mühldorf – Neuötting – Marktl – Simbach	Hourly
RB 42	Mühldorf – Tüßling – Altötting – Burghausen	Hourly
RB 44	(Landshut – Neumarkt Sankt-Veit –) Mühldorf – Wasserburg – Rosenheim	Hourly (every 2 hours)
RB 45	(Landshut – Neumarkt Sankt Veit –) Mühldorf – Garching – Freilassing – Salzburg	Hourly (every 2 hours)
RB 46	Mühldorf – Neumarkt-Sankt Veit – Passau	Hourly
RB 47	Mühldorf – Garching – Trostberg – Hörpolding (– Traunreut) – Traunstein	Every 2 hours

==== Freight ====
The station has great importance for freight because of the Bavarian Chemical Triangle. 800 freight cars are handled here each day. The former hump, however, was closed in 2006. The station is operated under the new Deutsche Bahn logistics system as a centre of freight for the Chemical Triangle, with freight cars redistributed towards Munich or Landshut. Freight trains in the future will also run towards international destinations and North Sea or Baltic Sea ports.

==== Connection to buses and private transport ====
The station is the centre of Mühldorf's bus network. There are connections to the surrounding area and to the centre of Mühldorf. Buses run on a basic hourly cycle. In the vicinity of the station there is a total of approximately 560 metered parking spaces, 390 of them in a parking garage opposite the station. In addition, there are three bicycle racks, where 283 bicycles can be parked.

== Future ==
The station is located at the planned Magistrale for Europe from Paris via Munich, Mühldorf and Vienna to Bratislava. The Munich–Mühldorf–Freilassing section is to be electrified, duplicated and upgraded for higher speeds.
