= Mühldorf–Pilsting railway =

Rail line in Bavaria, Germany

Mühldorf (Oberbay)–Pilsting
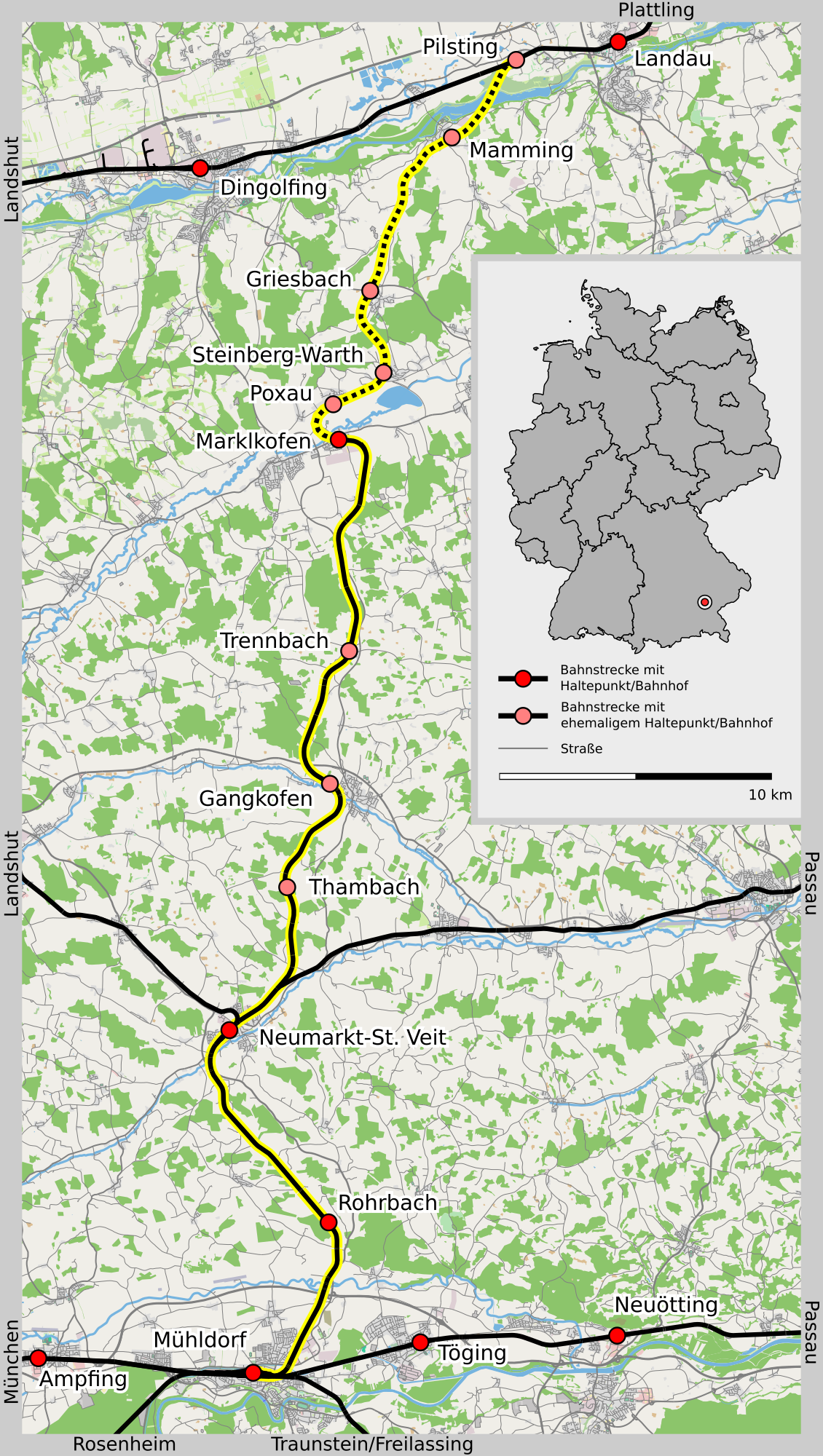

Overview
- Line number: 5700

Service
- Route number: 945 (formerly 427h, 427n, 943)

Technical
- Line length: 59.4 km (36.9 mi)
- Track gauge: 1,435 mm (4 ft 8 1/2 in)

The Mühldorf–Pilsting railway runs mainly through the province of Lower Bavaria in Germany, but part of the line crosses into Upper Bavaria as well. It was opened in 1875 by the Bavarian Eastern Railway Company (the Ostbahn) as part of the route between Mühldorf and Plattling, and was taken over by the Royal Bavarian State Railways on 1 January 1876. Whilst the southern section of the route from Mühldorf to Neumarkt-Sankt Veit became an important regional transport link as a result of the branches to Landshut and Passau at Neumarkt-Sankt Veit, the remaining section of the line never achieved its expected significance. Since 1970 only goods trains have worked between Neumarkt-Sankt Veit and Frontenhausen-Marklkofen, the adjoining section to Pilsting was closed entirely in 1969.

== Course ==
Leaving the railway hub of Mühldorf, the railway to Pilsting initially runs northwards for about 2 kilometres through the plain between the Inn Canal and the river Isen, before entering the hill country, typical of the area, at Rohrbach (Oberbay). On the 16 kilometres or so of line from Mühldorf to Neumarkt-Sankt Veit there are no large towns en route, so that, apart from Rohrbach railway station, there is just one intermediate station (now closed) on the heights of the Taibrechting hamlet near Niederbergkirchen. Shortly before Neumarkt-Sankt Veit it crosses the river Rott and follows the valley for the next three kilometres.

The town of Neumarkt-Sankt Veit has a centrally located railway station, from which the railways to Landshut and Passau branch off, giving the line its additional significance. Whilst the former leaves the route to Pilsting immediately northeast of the railway station at Neumarkt-Sankt Veit, the branch off point onto the Rottalbahn is about 2 kilometres further east. The route to Pilsting continues uphill towards the north, in order to cross the watershed between the Rott and the Bina in a cutting, after passing the former halt at Thambach, and finally runs down into the Bina valley. The market town of Gangkofen there has a railway station which is well west of the main settlement. North of Gangkofen the route climbs again in order to cross the line of hills between the Bina and the Vils. Near the highest point of the railway lies the little village of Obertrennbach, in which there is a small through station called Trennbach. Over the following eight kilometres the route falls again and reaches the Vils valley at Marklkofen via the valleys of the Trennbach and Schwimmbach. Here the trackbed follows the Vils for about 1.5 km in an east–west direction.

In the village of Marklkofen is a railway station with the double-barrelled name of Frontenhausen-Marklkofen that forms the present-day northern terminus of the route, and is named after the neighbouring village of Markt Frontenhausen. West of the railway station the route crossed the Vils on three bridge sections until the closure of the section of the line from Frontenhausen-Marklkofen to Pilsting in 1969. Via the little villages of Poxau and Steinberg, where at one time there were wayside halts, the track runs finally uphill to the north. At the hamlet of Wunder the line crossed the watershed between the Vils and the Isar in a long cutting. Around here is also the intermediate station which lies about 1.5 km from the village of Griesbach, part of the town of Markt Reisbach. With steep inclines in places the route continues on to Mamming, where there is a railway station north of the Mamming brook which is crossed on a large bridge. The largest structure on the route is found on the next section where the river Isar is crossed on a steel truss bridge comprising five 36 m long section. Behind Goben the route finally reaches the railway station of Pilsting above two kilometres south of the market town which gives it its name. The following section from Pilsting–Plattling is today part of the Landshut–Plattling railway.

== History ==
As part of a programme of construction authorised on the 3 August 1869 by the Bavarian state government, the Bavarian Eastern Railway Company (known as the Bavarian Ostbahn) began work on a project that year for a railway link between Mühldorf and Plattling. Together with the Rosenheim–Mühldorf railway, owned by the Royal Bavarian State Railways (K.Bay.Sts.B), and the Bavarian Forest railway, also planned by the Ostbahn and which would form a junction north of Plattling, this was to provide a trans-regional link between the Inn valley and Bohemia.

The licence for the construction eventually went to the Ostbahn on 25 November 1872, work beginning that same year. Under the direction of chief engineer, Ludwig Fromm, and architect, Karl Zenger, the 80.8 km long link from Mühldorf to Plattling was able to be completed in just under three years. The opening of the largely single-tracked main line, the trackbed of which was laid for two tracks along certain stretches in expectation of the likely rise in demand for rail services, took place on 15 October 1875. Between Pilsting and Landau, today part of the route from Landshut to Plattling, a second track was laid from the outset. On 1 January 1876 the route was incorporated, along with the entire Ostbahn company, into the K.Bay.Sts.B.

In the following years several branches were built: the Landshut–Pilsting link, which opened on 15 May 1880, the Neumarkt-Sankt Veit–Landshut railway, which went into service on 4 October 1883, and the Rottalbahn initially finished on 1. September 1879 as far as Pocking and finally extended all the way through to Passau by 6 October 1888.

The expected trans-regional significance of the railway link never materialised; traffic between Tyrol and Bohemia was largely routed via Munich. The section from Pilsting to Plattling, however, gained significance as part of the (Munich–)Landshut–Plattling(–Passau) route and its operations were immediately aligned to it. The route between Mühldorf and Neumarkt-Sankt Veit soon proved to be of regional importance for both passenger and goods traffic, thanks to the branches to Landshut and Pocking/Passau. The Neumarkt-Sankt Veit–Pilsting section never had high numbers of passengers, however, due to the relatively sparse population, railway stations that were sometimes a long way from the villages and trade links that were oriented towards Landshut rather than following the railway route.

With the rise of private motor car ownership from the 1950s the Deutsche Bundesbahn (DB) recorded an increasing reduction of the already low traffic volumes between Neumarkt-Sankt Veit and Pilsting. Various rationalisation measures were implemented, including the formal relegation of the Neumarkt-Sankt Veit–Pilsting section from a main line to a branch line in 1964. Nevertheless, the profitability of this section of the line continued to be inadequate. With the approval of the Federal Transport Ministry the DB closed local passenger services (SPNV) between Frontenhausen-Marklkofen and Pilsting as well as goods traffic between Frontenhausen-Marklkofen and Griesbach on 29 September 1969. With the cessation of goods transportation between Griesbach and Pilsting on 13 December 1969, the Frontenhausen-Marklkofen–Pilsting section was finally completely closed. The trackage there was dismantled in the years that followed.

SPNV services did not continue for much longer between Neumarkt-Sankt Veit and Frontenhausen-Marklkofen; the last passenger train worked the line on 27 September 1970. By contrast, the factory of car suppliers, Mann+Hummel, based in Marklkofen, provided well-laden trains for many years, before the firm transferred its operations from road to rail in the 1990s for various reasons. The only regular user of the Neumarkt-Sankt Veit–Frontenhausen-Marklkofen section since then is a joint regional refuse union that transfers household rubbish into containers in Marklkofen and dispatches it by rail to a refuse incineration plant at Burgkirchen. A sister firm of the company that runs the plant, Max Aicher, has also been the railway infrastructure company for the aforementioned section of the line since 2008.

The southern section, Mühldorf–Neumarkt-Sankt Veit, has been closely linked, operationally, with lines branching off in Newmarkt since the end of the 19th century and is used by trains working the Mühldorf–Landshut and Mühldorf–Passau routes. After the privatisation of the Deutsche Bundesbahn this section of the line was transferred to the SüdostBayernBahn division of the Deutsche Bahn. Since 28 September 2008 the points and signals on the line have been fully remotely controlled by the electronic signal box at Mühldorf.

== Operations ==
=== Passenger services ===
In the early years of operations two pairs of trains ran daily between Mühldorf and Plattling, later this increased to four, and sometimes they ran on to Bayerisch Eisenstein. After the opening of the branches, traffic between Mühldorf and Neumarkt-Sankt Veit and between Pilsting and Plattling noticeably increased, whilst on the middle section the extension of some train services to and from Rosenheim was the only significant change. In 1924 there were three pairs of trains per day on the whole route, several years later again the usual four. To attract more passengers, an intermediate stop was built at Poxau in the post-war years and the timetable added a fast-stopping train (Eilzug) from Rosenheim to Plattling and back to the existing four pairs of trains shuttling between Mühldorf and Plattling. These services continued until the cessation of traffic between Frontenhausen-Marklkofen and Pilsting in 1969.

Between Mühldorf and Neumarkt-Sankt Veit the route has also been worked by numerous trains on the routes to Landshut and Passau since the end of the 19th century. To these were added in the first half of the 20th century a moderate number of long-distance services, typically in the shape of a D-Zug (express) coach group from Berlin via Mühldorf to Klagenfurt. Under the direction of the Deutsche Bundesbahn between 15 and 20 passenger train pairs run daily on the Mühldorf–Neumarkt-Sankt Veit section. In the 1990s these services were organised at standard intervals (to a so-called Taktfahrplan), whereby the Bayerische Eisenbahngesellschaft tasked the operator, the SüdostBayernBahn, initially with two-hourly services on the Mühldorf–Passau route and also between Mühldorf and Landshut, these being supplemented with extra services especially at peak journey times. Hourly services were introduced to Landshut from 14 December 2008, to Passau from 12 December 2009.

=== Goods traffic ===
After the anticipated use of the route for trans-regional goods traffic did not come to fruition, it was used mainly by local customers. From the north these mainly ran to Gangkofen, trains heading south departed from stations between the hub at Mühldorf to Frontenhausen-Marklkofen. Mixed trains were uncommon. Passenger and goods traffic was separated from the outset.

Since about the 1960s the Mühldorf–Neumarkt-Sankt Veit(–Landshut) section trains have also increasingly come from the Bavarian Chemical Industry Triangle. Important local customers are the agricultural and forestry industries, the car suppliers, Mann+Hummel, at Marklkofen and, since the 1980s the regional refuse company. By 2008 after the loss of numerous freight customers, either of their own volition or as a result of the efforts of the former goods transport division of the Deutsche Bundesbahn and DB Cargo, the only goods traffic that remains are the chemical trains from the Chemical Industry Triangle, refuse transportation from Frontenhausen-Marklkofen and Eggenfelden (on the Rottalbahn) to the south and liquid transportation to Dietfurt (Rottalbahn). The train operation is Railion.

=== Running and rolling stock ===
For operations during the early years of the railway the relatively low-performance steam locomotives of the Ostbahn and the K.Bay.Sts.B. were sufficient. Amongst the classes employed were the tank engines of Class D XII, the all pervasive C III and the Bavarian B VI. Steam locomotives used by the Deutsche Reichsbahn and the Bundesbahn included engines of classes 50, 54 and 57 in goods traffic and 24, 64, 70 and 86 for passenger services.

railbuses of classes VT 95 and 98 took over much of the passenger traffic from the 1950s including the fast-stopping trains (Eilzug) on the Rosenheim–Plattling route, whilst for goods duties the Köf III and V 100 ousted the steam locomotives. In the end the latter also took over the passenger trains hitherto hauled by steam engines. Variants of the V 160 also worked the route from the 1960s, mainly hauling goods trains from the chemical works "triangle".

Since the early 1990s, passenger services from Mühldorf to Landshut and Passau have been mainly provided by Class 628 multiples, more rarely using Class 218 diesel locomotives. Regional goods traffic has been handled by Railion since 2006 using Class 294 locos. Representatives of classes 217 and 232/233 locomotives have been used for the chemical trains since the 1990s.

== See also ==
- Royal Bavarian State Railways
- List of scheduled railway routes in Germany
- List of railway stations in Bavaria

== Sources ==
- Karl Bürger: "Kurvig and bucklig" (Teil 1). In: EisenbahnGeschichte Nr. 31 (2008), S. 46 - 54.
- Siegfried Bufe, Nebenbahnen zwischen Arber und Hallertau, Bufe-Fachbuch-Verlag, Egglham, 1999, ISBN 978-3-922138-69-3
- Die Bahnlinie Plattling–Pilsting–Mühldorf, The 64er, Vol.1/1994, Historischer Eisenbahnverein Plattling, Plattling, 1994
- Reinhard Wanka, Wolfgang Wiesner, Die Hauptbahn Munich–Simbach und ihre Zweigbahnen, Bufe-Fachbuch-Verlag, Egglham, 1996, ISBN 3-922138-59-4, pp. 14–16, 23
- Walther Zeitler, Eisenbahnen in Niederbayern und der Oberpfalz. Die Geschichte der Eisenbahn in Ostbayern, Buch- and Kunstverlag Oberpfalz, Amberg, 1997, ISBN 978-3-924350-61-1
