= Markt Schwaben station =

Railway station in bavaria

Markt Schwaben
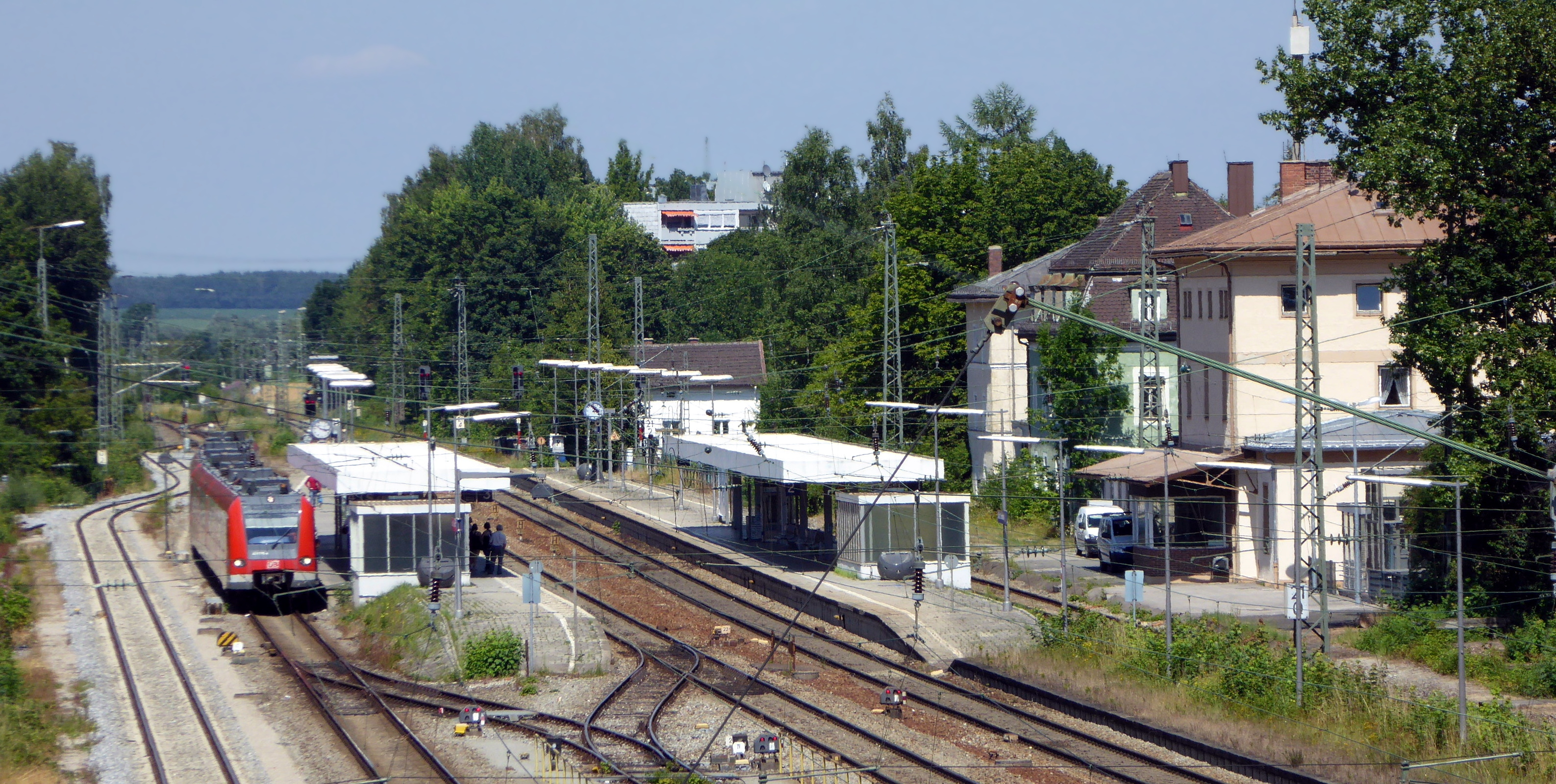

General information
- Location: Bahnhofstr. 36; 85570 Markt Schwaben; Bavaria; Germany
- Coordinates: 48.193268°N 11.861900°E
- Owner: Deutsche Bahn
- Operator: DB Netz; DB Station&Service
- Lines: Munich–Mühldorf railway Markt Schwaben–Erding railway
- Platforms: 2
- Tracks: 4
- Train operators: S-Bahn München; Südostbayernbahn
- Connections: 446, 459, 463, 469, 505, 507, 568, 5050, 5680

Other information
- Station code: 3971
- DS100 code: MSB
- IBNR: 8003879
- Category: 3
- Fare zone: : 2 and 3
- Website: www.bahnhof.de

History
- Opened: 1 May 1871

Services
| Preceding station | | Following station |
|---|---|---|
| Munich East towards München Hbf | RE 4 Limited service | Dorfen towards Simbach (Inn) |
| Munich East towards München Hbf | RB 40 | Hörlkofen towards Mühldorf (Oberbay) |
| Preceding station | Munich S-Bahn | Following station |
| Poing towards Petershausen or Altomünster | S2 | Ottenhofen (Oberbayern) towards Erding |
Location

Markt Schwaben station is a railway station on the Munich S-Bahn in the municipality of Markt Schwaben in the northeast area of Munich, Germany. It is served by the S-Bahn line S2.

== History ==
The Munich–Mühldorf railway was taken in operation on 1 May 1871. Subsequently, the municipality of Erding also tried for a railway connection, this could be opened on 16 November 1872. In 1970, the Markt Schwaben–Erding railway and Munich–Mühldorf railway (Munich-Markt Schwaben section) was electrified to introduce a S-Bahn operation on these lines. In 1972, with the establishment of the Munich S-Bahn system, Markt Schwaben was better connected, including by the connection to Munich through the Münchner Verkehrs- und Tarifverbund.

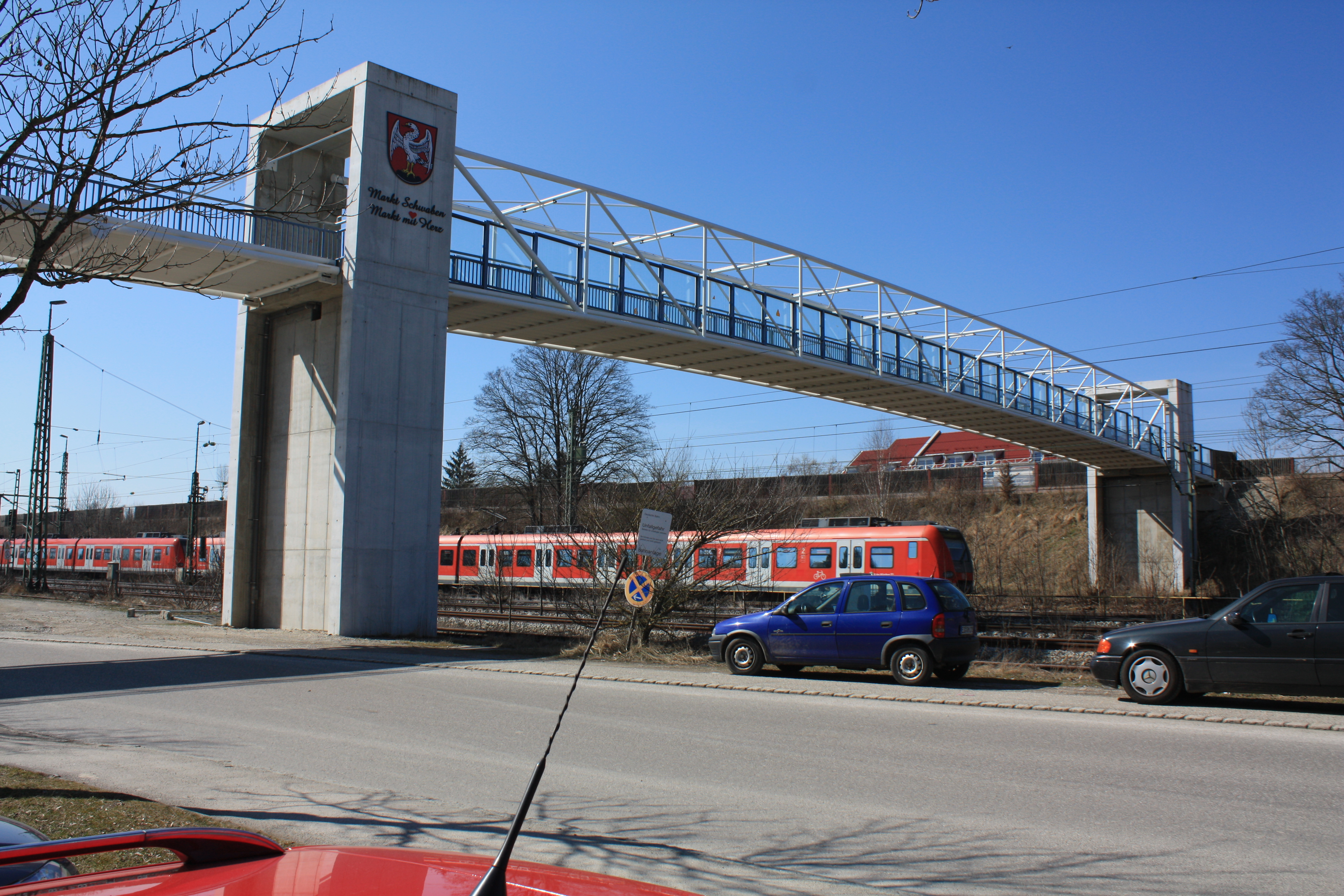
Footbridge in the southwestern part of the station.
