= Simbach =

Simbach is the name of two towns in Bavaria, Germany:

- Simbach, Dingolfing-Landau
- Simbach am Inn, Rottal-Inn
  - Simbach (Inn) station
