= Poing station =

Railway station in Bavaria

Poing
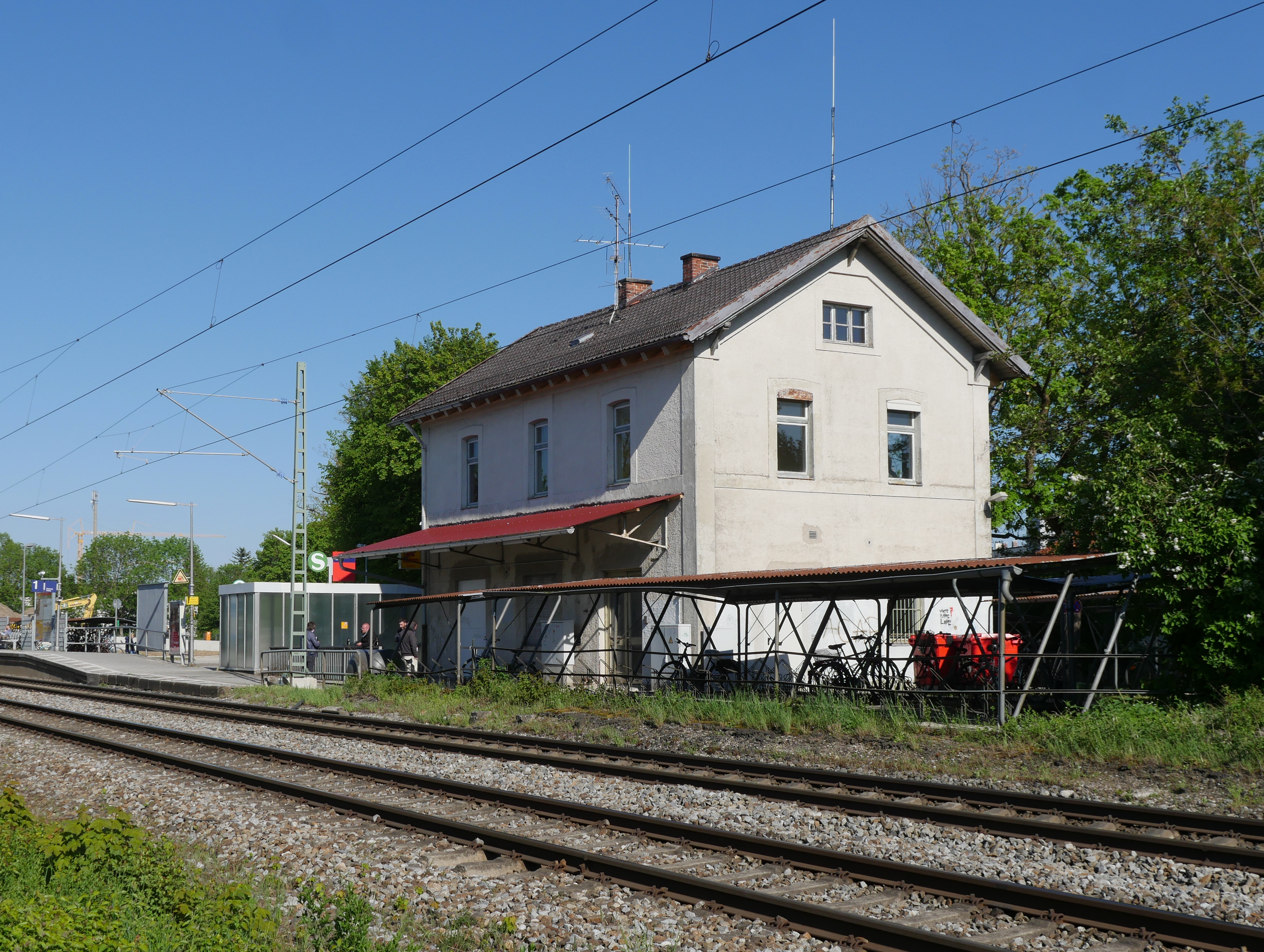
- Station building, 2020

General information
- Location: Bahnhofstraße 20; 85586 Poing; Bavaria; Germany
- Coordinates: 48.1710°N 11.8086°E
- System: Hp
- Owner: Deutsche Bahn
- Operator: DB Netz; DB Station&Service
- Lines: Munich–Mühldorf railway (KBS 940)
- Platforms: 2 side platforms
- Tracks: 2
- Train operators: S-Bahn München
- Connections: 446, 459, 460, 461, 462, 464, 465, 468

Construction
- Parking: yes
- Cycle facilities: yes
- Accessible: partly

Other information
- Station code: 4981
- DS100 code: MPO
- IBNR: 8004854
- Category: 5
- Fare zone: : 1 and 2
- Website: www.bahnhof.de

History
- Opened: 1 May 1871; 155 years ago

Services
Preceding station	Munich S-Bahn	Following station
Grub (Oberbay) towards Petershausen or Altomünster	S2	Markt Schwaben towards Erding
Location
- Location within Bavaria Location within Germany Location within Europe

Poing station (German: Haltepunkt Poing) is a railway station in the municipality of Poing, located in the Ebersberg district in Bavaria, Germany.
