= Grub (Oberbay) station =

Railway station in Bavaria

Grub (Oberbay)
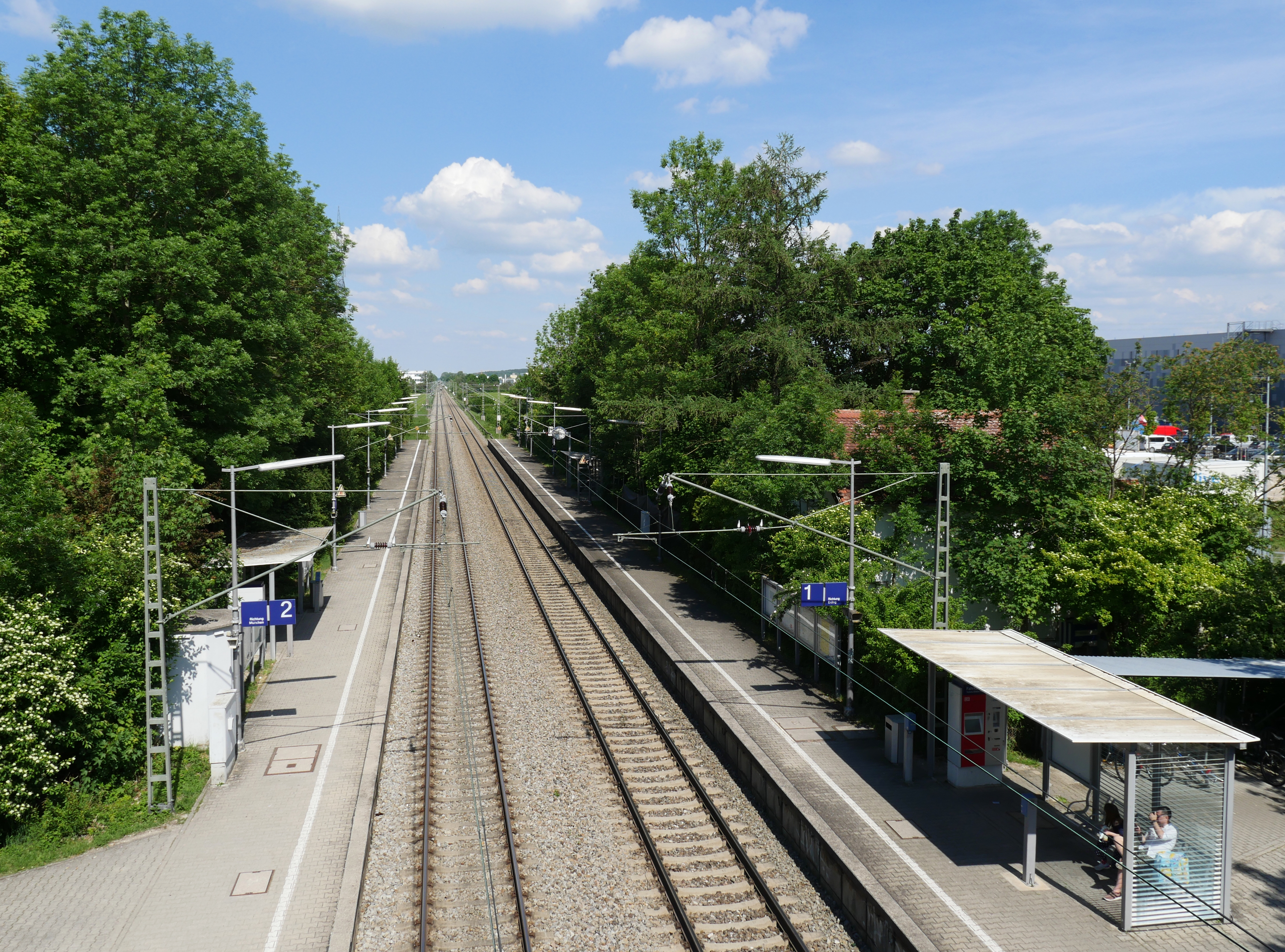
- 2020

General information
- Location: Parsdorfer Straße; 85586 Poing; Bavaria; Germany
- Coordinates: 48.1644°N 11.7824°E
- System: Hp
- Owner: Deutsche Bahn
- Operator: DB Netz; DB Station&Service
- Lines: Munich–Mühldorf railway (KBS 940)
- Platforms: 2 side platforms
- Tracks: 2
- Train operators: S-Bahn München
- Connections: 446 452 463

Construction
- Parking: yes
- Cycle facilities: yes
- Accessible: partly

Other information
- Station code: 2376
- DS100 code: MGRB
- IBNR: 8002435
- Category: 5
- Fare zone: : 1 and 2
- Website: www.bahnhof.de

History
- Opened: 1 May 1897; 129 years ago

Services
Preceding station	Munich S-Bahn	Following station
Heimstetten towards Petershausen or Altomünster	S2	Poing towards Erding
Location
- Location within Bavaria Location within Germany Location within Europe

Grub (Oberbay) station (German: Haltepunkt Grub (Oberbay)) is a railway station in Grub in the municipality of Poing, located in the Ebersberg district in Bavaria, Germany.
