= Südostbayernbahn =

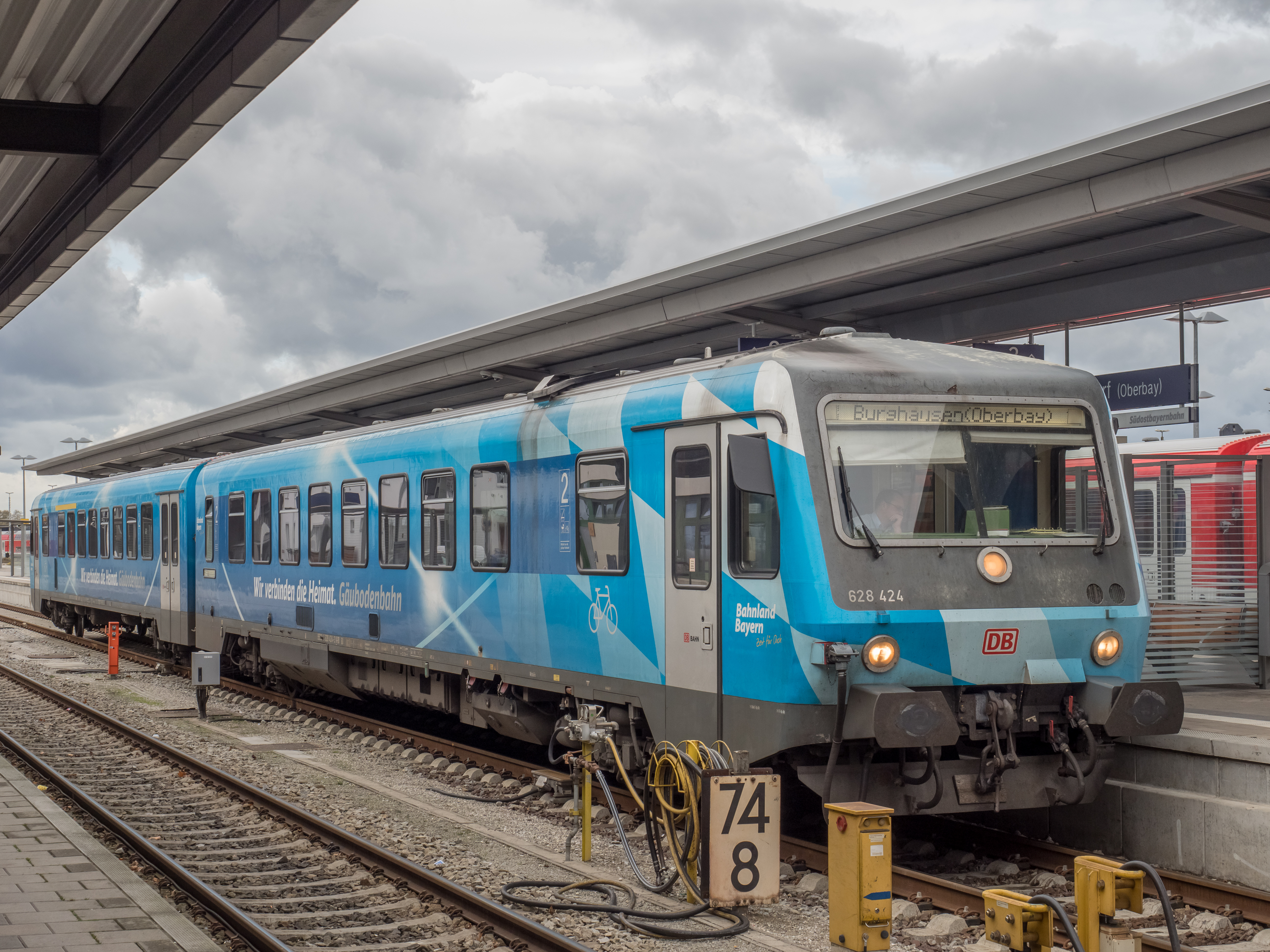
- A DB Class 628 diesel multiple unit of the Südostbayernbahn at Mühldorf am Inn railway station

Overview
- Status: In Service
- Owner: Deutsche Bahn AG
- Locale: Bavaria, Germany
- Stations: 88

Service
- Type: Rapid Transit, Regional Rail
- Depot(s): Mühldorf
- Rolling stock: Class 213 (2); Class 218 (26); Class 245 (8); Class 426; Class 628 (34)
- Daily ridership: 26,000

History
- Opened: 2001

Technical
- Line length: 540 kilometres (340 mi)
- Track gauge: 1,435 mm (4 ft 8 1/2 in) standard gauge
- Electrification: None
- Operating speed: 150 kilometres per hour (93 mph)

Südostbayernbahn (Southeast Bavaria Railway) is one of several regional railway networks in Germany owned by Germany's national railway, Deutsche Bahn AG (DB AG). Since 2001, the network has included the railway hub of Mühldorf which connects 7 major railway lines from Munich, Rosenheim, Freilassing, Burghausen, Simbach am Inn, Passau and Landshut, forming a star-shaped network of lines called Linienstern Mühldorf ("Mühldorf route star network"). SüdostBayernBahn is subordinated to DB RegioNetz Verkehr and DB RegioNetz Infrastruktur.

== Railway network ==
In order to be able to operate railway networks more efficiently on a geographical basis, the Deutsche Bahn introduced the concept of regional networks or Regio-Netze. One of the five national Regio-Netze is called the Südostbayernbahn (SOB) and is responsible for the infrastructure, and/or passenger services, on the following routes:

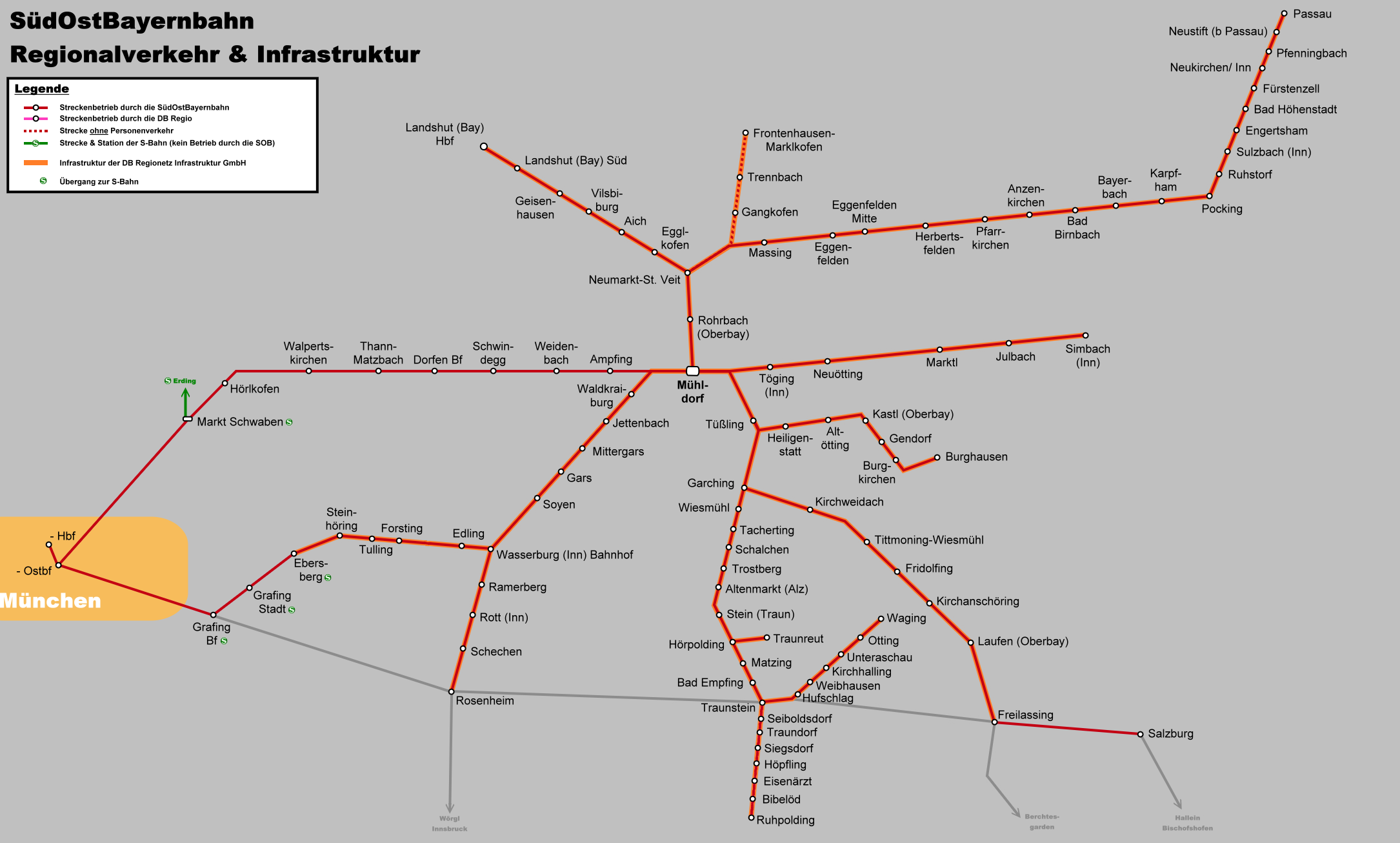
SüdostBayernBahn railway network

Line	Timetable No.	Route	Infrastructure	Services
RB 32	KBS 932, Gäubodenbahn	Neufahrn (Ndby.)–Straubing–Bogen		X
RB 40	KBS 940	Munich–Mühldorf		X
RB 44; RB 45	KBS 945	Mühldorf–Neumarkt-St. Veit–Landshut	X	X
	exKBS 427h	Neumarkt-St. Veit–Frontenhausen-Marklkofen	X	withdrawn
RB 46	KBS 946, Rottalbahn	Neumarkt-St. Veit–Passau	X	X
RB 41	KBS 941	Mühldorf–Simbach am Inn	X	X
RB 42	KBS 942	Mühldorf–Burghausen	X	X
RB 45	KBS 945	Mühldorf–Garching–Freilassing	X	X
	KBS 951 (sections of)	Freilassing–Salzburg		X
RB 47	KBS 947, Traun-Alz-Bahn	(Mühldorf–)Garching–Trostberg–Hörpolding	X	X
RB 49	KBS 949	Traunreut–Hörpolding–Traunstein	X	X
RB 52	KBS 952	Prien am Chiemsee–Aschau im Chiemgau		X
RB 59	KBS 959	Traunstein–Waging	X	X
	KBS 953	Traunstein–Ruhpolding	X	BRB (since Dec 2022)
RB 44	KBS 944	Rosenheim–Wasserburg–Mühldorf	X	X
RB 48	KBS 948, Filzenexpress	Wasserburg–Ebersberg	X	X
RB 48	KBS 948, 951 (sections of)	Ebersberg–Grafing–Munich		X

== Operations ==
Südostbayernbahn has rented the lines for an extended period of time and is therefore classed as the railway infrastructure company for its network. The renting of the routes from DB Netz is done through DB RegioNetz Infrastruktur.

As a railway infrastructure company, Südostbayernbahn now only operates trains which provide passenger services (the freight services to Frontenhausen-Marklkofen having been taken over by Railion). These passenger services are provided using Class 218 locomotives and Class 628 diesel multiple units. Amongst the coaches used are modernized Silberling carriages and double-decker coaches. The double-deckers include three air-conditioned double-decker driving cars. The delivery of the latest class of air-conditioned, double-decker coaches began in March 2007. On those routes for which Südostbayernbahn is only responsible for infrastructure, RegionalBahn trains are operated by DB Regio Bayern using Class 628 diesel multiple units and Class 426 electric multiple units. In addition RegionalBahn trains are also run by Südostbayernbahn themselves on the following lines:

- Mühldorf–Dorfen–Munich Hauptbahnhof (KBS 940)
- via Freilassing to Salzburg (KBS 945/951)
- via Ebersberg to Grafing, individual trains to Munich Ost (KBS 948)

In total the network has 435 km of line and 88 stations, which are worked daily by 260 trains. Around 9.5 million passengers use Südostbayernbahn trains annually.
