= Mühldorf–Freilassing railway =

Railway line in Germany

Overview
- Line number: 5723 Mühldorf–Freilassing; 5724 Wiesmühl–Tittmoning
- Locale: Bavaria

Service
- Route number: 945

Technical
- Line length: 65.6 km (40.8 mi)
- Track gauge: 1,435 mm (4 ft 8 1/2 in) standard gauge
- Operating speed: 120 km/h (75 mph) (maximum)

The Mühldorf–Freilassing railway is a major railway in Bavaria. The line, which is operated by the Südostbayernbahn (SOB) (part of Deutsche Bahn), runs from Mühldorf to Freilassing in the German state of Bavaria.

== History ==
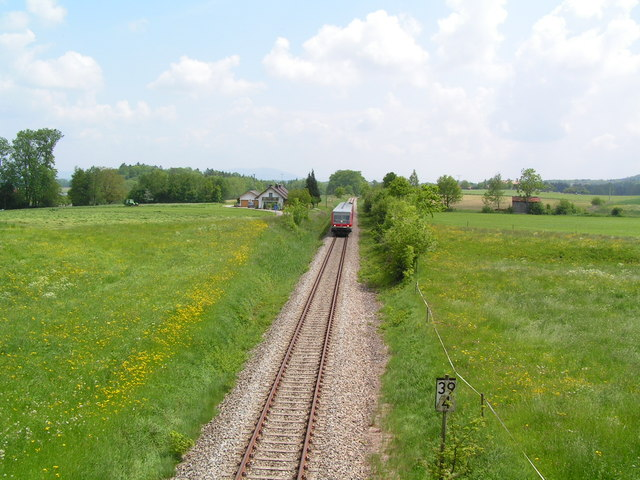
2010: line to Freilassing (between Tittmoning-Wiesmühl and Fridolfing)

The rail link between Mühldorf and Freilassing was opened on 1 December 1908 as one of the last sections opened by Royal Bavarian State Railways. The line, which was conceived as an approach line to the Tauern Railway and was designated therefore as the "Bavarian Tauern Railway" (bayerische Tauernbahn), was created by linking and upgrading existing local line segments:

- Mühldorf–Tüßling, part of the Mühldorf–Burghausen railway opened on 10 August 1897
- Freilassing-Wiesmühl, part of the Freilassing–Tittmoning branch line, opened on 14 June 1890 (Freilassing–Laufen) and 1 May 1894 (Laufen–Tittmoning).

Two options were available: a route from Burgkirchen (on the Mühldorf–Burghausen line) to Wiesmühl (on the existing line to Tittmoning) and, on the other hand, the Tüßling–Garching–Wiesmühl route. The latter, which was implemented, also had, apart from providing a railway connecting Kirchweidach and Garching, the advantage that the former branch line from Traunstein to Trostberg could be connected with the new line in Garching.

In Tüßling a change in the route of the line to Burghausen was made because it was originally planned to build the junction with the branch of the Tauern Railway in Ehring. Tüßling would then have a station on each line, which would have made transfers much more difficult. Therefore, the stations at Tüßling and Heiligenstatt were moved, a new section was built from the new Tüßling station to the line to Burghausen and the old section was abandoned.

The route was taken over by the Bavarian Group Administration (Gruppenverwaltung Bayern) of Deutsche Reichsbahn on 24 April 1920 and it is now operated by Deutsche Bahn.

While the national significance of the line was always relatively small despite some long-distance services in the first half of the 20th century, it is still of major significance for local connections. Several smaller intermediate stations were abandoned in the second half of the 20th century. Kirchweidach station, which was abandoned on 29 May 1988, was reopened on 2 June 1996.

Passenger services closed on 27 September 1969 on the Tittmoning-Wiesmühl–Tittmoning section of the original Freilassing–Tittmoning line, which since 1908 had operated as a branch line. Freight were abandoned on the branch on 31 July 1981.

The first completed project on the current upgrade of the Mühldorf–Salzburg line was a 160-metre-long concrete bridge over the Inn just south of Mühldorf, which was opened in late September 2011.

== Operations ==
Since 2003, almost all passenger trains running from Mühldorf continue via Freilassing to Salzburg. Moreover, since 2005, almost all of these trains continue over the Neumarkt-Sankt Veit – Landshut railway to Landshut. Services operate at two-hour intervals each day on the whole line; from Monday to Friday additional services running between Mühldorf and Trostberg mean that there are hourly services between Mühldorf and Garching.

In freight transport, on weekdays a pair of local trains operates on the Mühldorf–Freilassing–Traunstein route as block trains to and from firms in the "Bavarian Chemical Triangle" (Bayerisches Chemiedreieck) in Gendorf and Burghausen. Freight trains also operate between Mühldorf and Garching, serving customers in Garching and on the Traunstein–Garching railway.

On the Mühldorf–Tüßling section of the "Bavarian Tauern Railway" there are also numerous passenger and freight trains serving the Mühldorf–Burghausen line.

== Development planning ==
It has been decided to electrify the Mühldorf–Salzburg line and to duplicate the Kirchweidach–Tittmoning-Wiesmühl section. In addition, the electrification of the Tüßling-Burghausen section is also proposed. The line speed will be upgraded to 160 km/h as far as possible using the existing line. The financing of the construction work, which was initially to be completed by 2012, has not been fully accounted for according to Deutsche Bahn. Funding is now secured for duplication of the Mühldorf–Tüßling section, including electrification, and the federal transport minister Peter Ramsauer indicated in September 2011 that it would be commissioned in 2016. The corresponding financial agreement for €127.6 million was signed on 14 February 2013 by DB Netz AG and the Federal Ministry of Transport. After the two phases of the planning approval process are completed during 2013, the duplication is expected to be completed in 2017. In addition, a funding agreement has been reached to provide €50 million for the upgrading of the Rosenheim–Salzburg railway from Freilassing to the Austrian border to three tracks.

The planned upgrade would also bring considerable relief on the Munich–Rosenheim route and therefore would make available additional capacity for freight traffic on the Brenner Railway.
