= Bavarian C III =

The Bavarian C III engines were steam locomotives of the Royal Bavarian State Railways (Königlich Bayerische Staatsbahn).

== Standard variant ==
Bavarian C III, standard variant
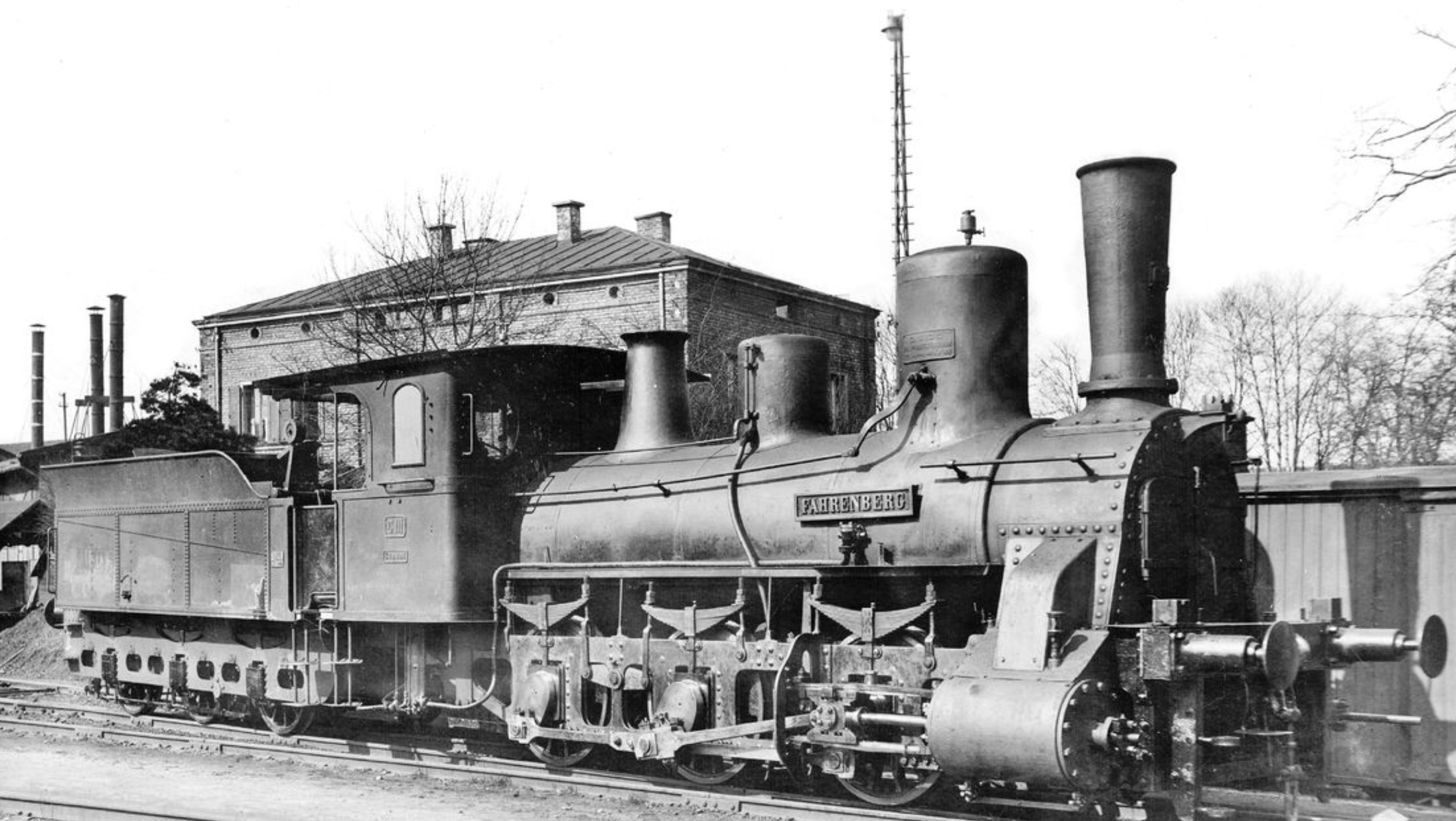
- C III Nr. 600 in Munich
Type and origin
- Builder: Maffei, Krauss
- Build date: 1868–1879
- Total produced: 239
Specifications
- Configuration
  - Whyte: 0-6-0
- Gauge: 1,435 mm (4 ft 8 1/2 in)
- Driver dia.: 1,253 or 1,274 mm (4 ft 1 3/8 in or 4 ft 2 1/8 in)
- Length
  - Over beams: 14,115–14,300 mm (46 ft 3 3/4 in – 46 ft 11 in)
- Axle load: 12.0–14.0 t (11.8–13.8 long tons; 13.2–15.4 short tons)
- Adhesive weight: 34.5–38.0 t (34.0–37.4 long tons; 38.0–41.9 short tons)
- Service weight: 34.5–38.0 t (34.0–37.4 long tons; 38.0–41.9 short tons)
- Water cap.: 8.95 or 10.5 m^{3} (1,970 or 2,310 imp gal; 2,360 or 2,770 US gal)
- Boiler pressure: 10 kgf/cm^{2} (981 kPa; 142 lbf/in^{2})
- Heating surface
  - Firebox: 1.65 m^{2} (17.8 sq ft)
  - Evaporative: 112.80–119.10 m^{2} (1,214.2–1,282.0 sq ft)
- Cylinders: 2
- Cylinder size: 468–508 mm (18 7/16–20 in)
- Piston stroke: 660 mm (26 in)
Performance figures
- Maximum speed: 45 km/h (28 mph)
Career
- Numbers: 385 STEPHENSON to 809 MARTINLAMITZ; DR 53 7871 – 53 7990 (planned)
- Retired: by 1925

The standard variant of the C III was developed from the Class C II. A total of 239 examples were built, which varied somewhat in their dimensions. For example, the third batch had a boiler diameter 30 mm greater than the others. The vehicles taken over by the Reichsbahn were to have been given the numbers 53 7871–7990. However these locomotives were retired by 1925. Several engines were sent to Belgium as reparations.

These engines were coupled with Bavarian 3 T 8.95 and 3 T 10.5 tenders.

== Sigl variant ==
Bavarian C III, Sigl variant
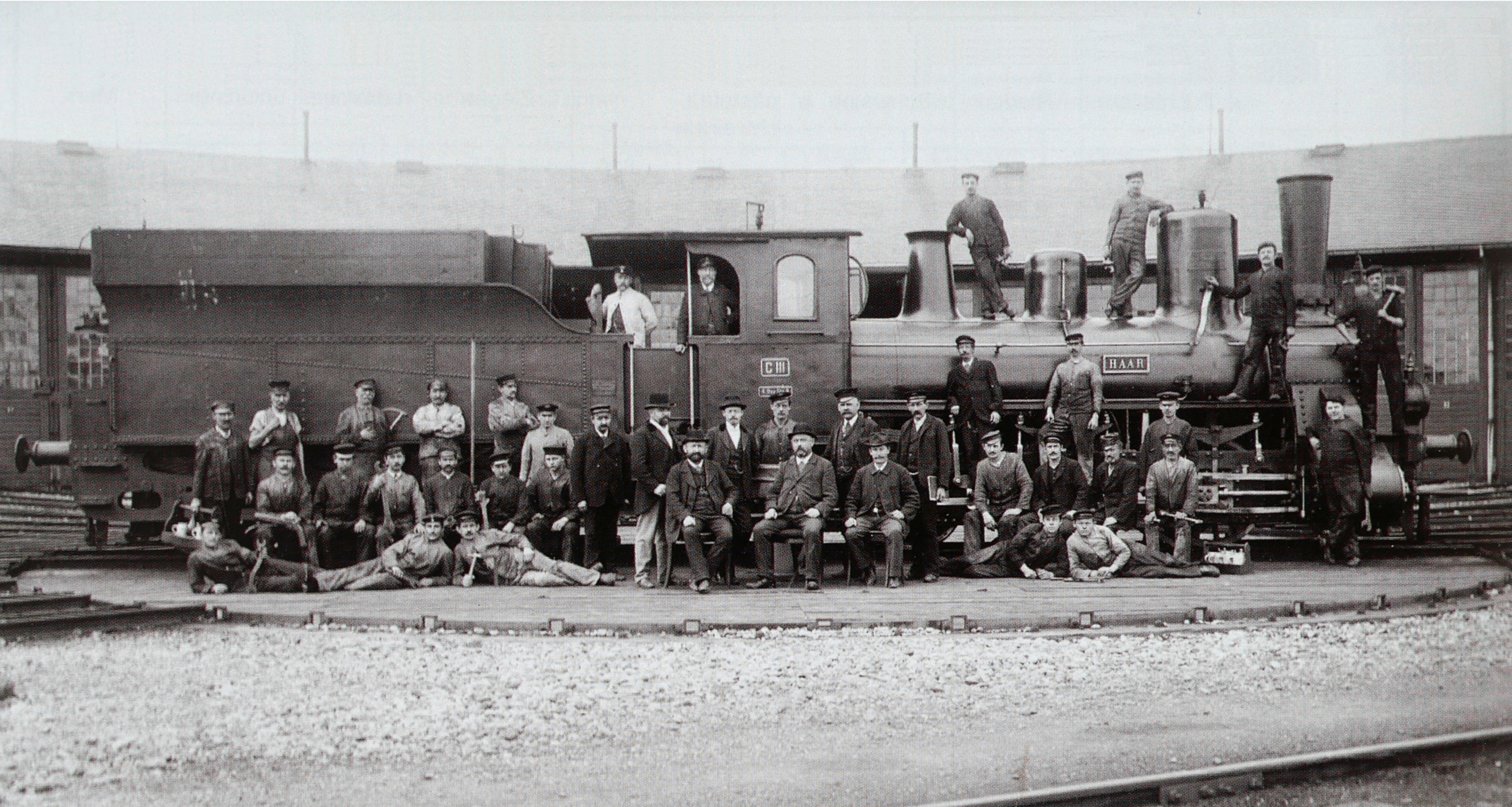
- C III Nr. 598, Sigl variant, in Simbach (Inn)
Type and origin
- Builder: Sigl
- Build date: 1872–1874
- Total produced: 14
Specifications
- Configuration
  - Whyte: 0-6-0
- Gauge: 1,435 mm (4 ft 8 1/2 in)
- Driver dia.: 1,196 or 1,274 mm (3 ft 11 1/8 in or 4 ft 2 1/8 in)
- Length
  - Over beams: 14,890 mm (48 ft 10 1/4 in)
- Axle load: 11.4–13.2 t (11.2–13.0 long tons; 12.6–14.6 short tons)
- Adhesive weight: 34.2–39.6 t (33.7–39.0 long tons; 37.7–43.7 short tons)
- Service weight: 34.2–39.6 t (33.7–39.0 long tons; 37.7–43.7 short tons)
- Water cap.: 12.0 m^{3} (2,600 imp gal; 3,200 US gal)
- Boiler pressure: 8.5 or 10 kgf/cm^{2} (834 or 981 kPa; 121 or 142 lbf/in^{2})
- Heating surface
  - Firebox: 1.59–1.84 m^{2} (17.1–19.8 sq ft)
  - Evaporative: 114.80–114.30 m^{2} (1,235.7–1,230.3 sq ft)
- Cylinders: 2
- Cylinder size: 460 mm (18 1/8 in)
- Piston stroke: 660 mm (26 in)
Performance figures
- Maximum speed: 45 km/h (28 mph)
Career
- Numbers: 1 GERMANIA to 601 ARMANNSBERG; DR 53 7831–7833 (planned)
- Retired: to 1924

These locomotives originally built for Hungary were acquired by the firm of Sigl, because new locomotives were urgently ordered for goods services. Following a subsequent exchange of the boiler they were identical with other vehicles of this class apart from their overall weight. The locomotives taken over by the Reichsbahn were to be given the numbers 53 7831–7833 but were retired by 1925.

The vehicles were coupled with Bavarian 3 T 12 tenders.

== See also ==
- Royal Bavarian State Railways
- List of Bavarian locomotives and railbuses
