= Poing, Bavaria =

Poing
- Municipality
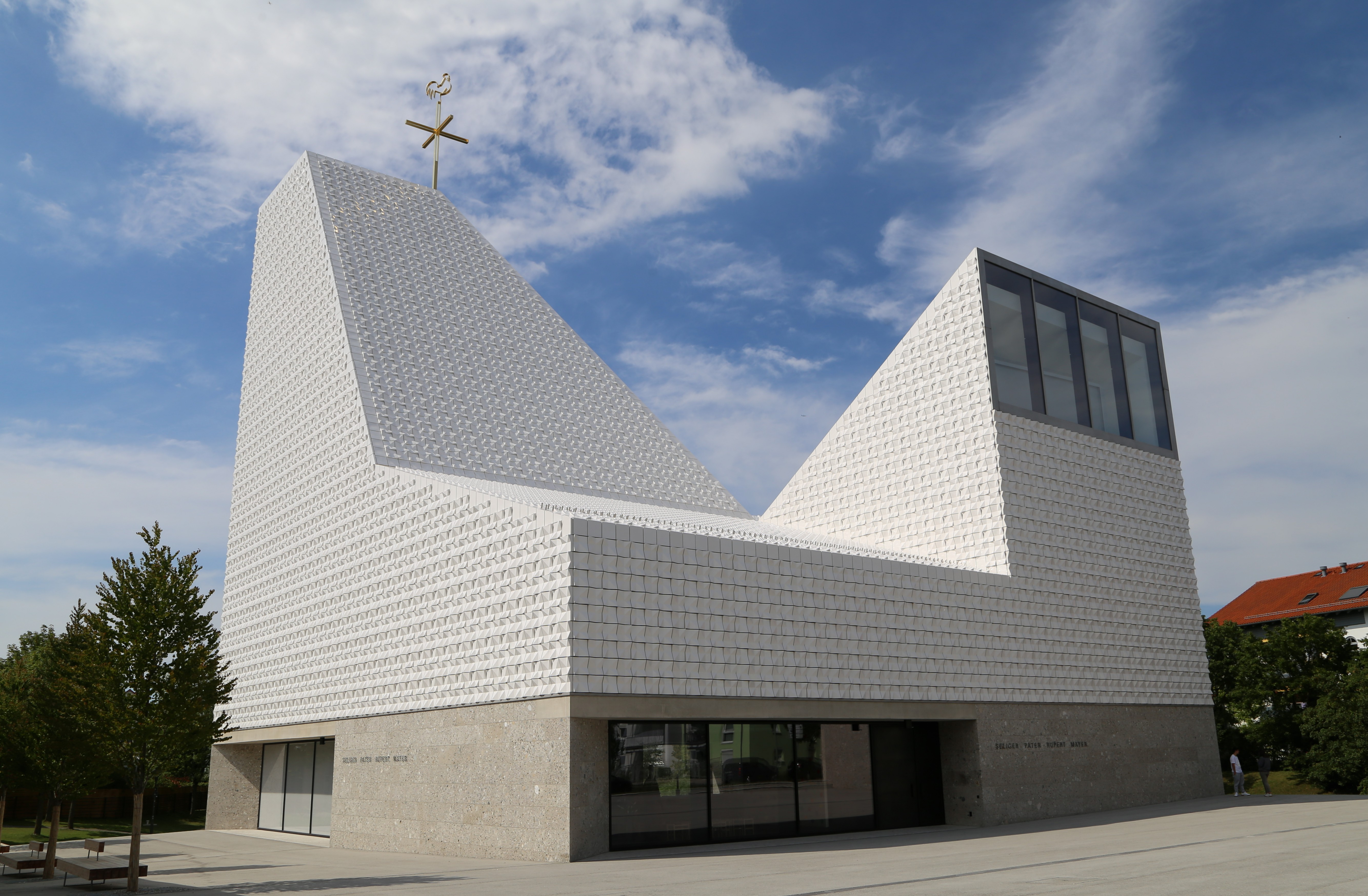
- Church of the Blessed Rupert Mayer

- Flag Coat of arms

- Location of Poing within Ebersberg district
- Interactive map of Poing
- Location within Germany Location within Bavaria
- Coordinates: 48°10′N 11°49′E
- Country: Germany
- State: Bavaria
- Admin. region: Oberbayern
- District: Ebersberg

Government
  - Mayor (2020–26): Thomas Stark (Ind.)

Area
  - Total: 12.92 km^{2} (4.99 sq mi)
- Elevation: 518 m (1,699 ft)

Population (2025-12-31)
  - Total: 16,593
  - Density: 1,284/km^{2} (3,326/sq mi)
- Time zone: UTC+01:00 (CET)
  - Summer (DST): UTC+02:00 (CEST)
- Postal codes: 85586
- Dialling codes: 08121
- Vehicle registration: EBE
- Website: www.poing.de

Poing (German pronunciation: [ˈpoːɪŋ]) is a municipality in the Upper Bavarian district of Ebersberg, lying 18 kilometres (11 mi) east of central Munich.

== Geography ==
Poing is approximately 20 kilometres (12 mi) NE of Munich and is serviced by the Munich S-Bahn (S2) and MVV Bus systems. Poing has two constituent communities named Angelbrechting and Grub. Poing is bordered on the east by Anzing and Markt Schwaben, Pliening in the North, Kirchheim to the West and Parsdorf to the South.

== History ==
It is believed that Poing has been settled for more than 5,000 years. The ending on the community's name suggests a Celtic origin.

=== Population development ===
Over the last few decades, Poing has developed rapidly from a small village into the second biggest community on the S-Bahn line 2 (S2) area (up to Erding) and into the second biggest community in Ebersberg after Vaterstetten. In 2006, it overtook the once dominant neighboring community of Kirchheim. The sharp rise in population is due to the many new building projects in the northern area of the city, to which no end is yet foreseen. Therefore, even more development projects are expected.

Year	Inhabitants
31 December 2002	11,581
31 December 2003	11,889
31 December 2004	12,285
31 December 2005	12,688
31 December 2006	13,189
1 February 2009	13,551
31 December 2010	13,877
31 December 2011	14,379
31 December 2012	14,306
31 December 2013	14,695
31 December 2014	15,005
31 December 2015	15,222
29 February 2016	15,598
1 October 2018	16,458
1 May 2020	16.655
31 December 2020	16.619

Source: Statistisches Bundesamt Deutschland

== Politics ==
The political parties currently represented on Poing's municipal council are the CSU, the SPD, the Greens, the FWG Poing e. V. and the FDP.

The last mayoral election was held in March 2020. Thomas Stark won the election after the previous mayor, Albert Hingerl (SPD) decided to retire after 20 years in the position.

=== Coat of arms ===
Poing's arms might heraldically be described thus: In azure a fess argent upon which a chevron Or below which an eight-pointed star argent.

From the Poing patrician family Prielmair's arms came both the star and the chevron. The shield's color and the silver fess hearken back to the community's former fast link with the House of Wittelsbach.

== Culture and sightseeing ==
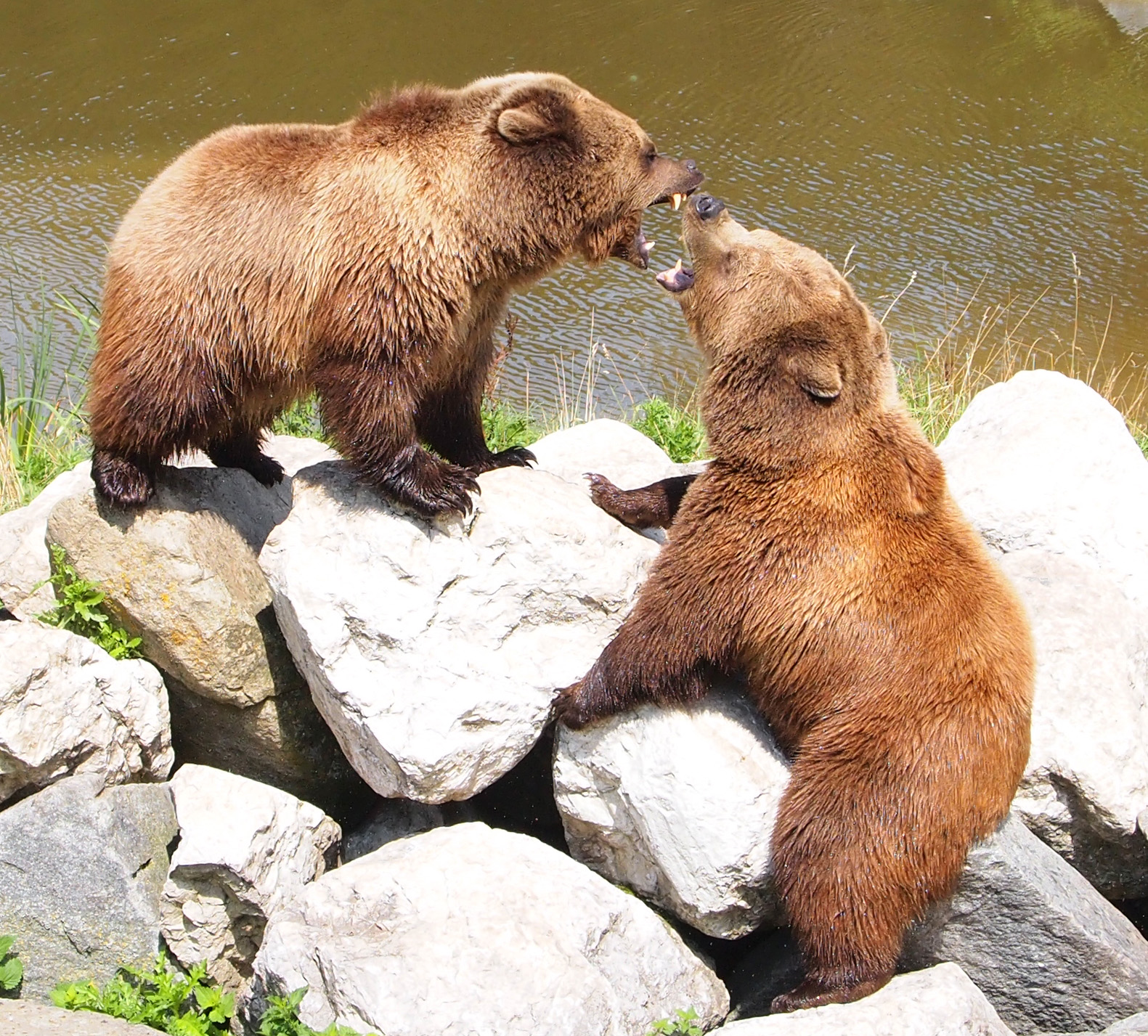
Fighting bears in Wildpark Poing

The Wildpark Poing, opened in 1970 and lies to the east of the community. In some parts of the park, visitors can walk through large outdoor enclosures containing various kinds of free roaming animals, which the public may feed.

== Economy and infrastructure ==
=== Transport ===
Poing is serviced by the Munich S-Bahn network (S2) (Erding-Petershausen). There are two S-Bahn stops of the Munich S-Bahn: Poing station and Grub (Oberbay) station.

Highway connections include Autobahn A 94 (Munich-Passau) from Parsdorf/Poing, and from Hohenlinden Bundesstraße B 12 (towards Passau).

FTO (Flughafen-Tangente-Ost, Airport Connector Road - St2580), connects the A 94 with the airport. It is located east of the community, and opened for traffic on Sep. 9 2009. FTO provides a direct north-south connection from the A94 to the Airport, improving Poing's connections with Erding, Munich and the airport.

=== Businesses ===
The biggest business in town is the firm Canon Production Printing. The Poing plant, with roughly 1,500 workers, produces printers. Moreover, the following firms large employers are to be found:

- Avnet EM (Logistics, Silica, Time, Memec, EBV, ALS, Avnet Abacus)
- BayWa (hardware and garden store)
- Edeka
- Best Secret GmbH / Schustermann & Borenstein GmbH
- Stahlgruber, car replacement parts and accessories, founded in 1923
- Oehms Classics
