= Mühldorf–Simbach am Inn railway =

Railway line in Germany

Mühldorf (Oberbay) – Simbach (Inn) border

Overview
- Line number: 5600

Service
- Route number: 941

Technical
- Line length: 40.286 km (25.033 mi)
- Track gauge: 1,435 mm (4 ft 8 1/2 in)
- Operating speed: 140 km/h (87 mph)

The Mühldorf–Simbach am Inn railway is a 39 km long, single-tracked, unelectrified main line in Bavaria in southern Germany.

Leaving Mühldorf station it runs in an east-west direction to the German-Austrian state border, where it joins the Innviertel Railway. Until 1969 there was also a junction here with the railway to Pocking. The line is the shortest link between Munich and Vienna, but has losts its importance over the years to the Munich–Salzburg–Linz line.

An industrial siding to the „Inntal“ industrial estate branches off at the eastern end of Töging (Inn) station. Until the mid-1990s it has served the United Aluminium Works (Vereinigte Aluminiumwerke or VAW) in Töging. Currently the firm of Aleris Recycling uses it 3 times per week.

== Services ==
=== Passenger services ===
There are currently four stations along the line - Mühldorf (Obb), Töging (Inn), Marktl and Simbach (Inn) - and two halts - Neuötting and Julbach. Julbach was reopened on 30 April 2004, after the halt, built in 1907, had been closed since 1984. In addition, from 1899 there were two other stations - Perach and Buch, which were closed in the 1980s.

Passenger services on this line are currently provided by SüdostBayernBahn, a 100%-owned subsidiary of Deutschen Bahn (DB). The line is worked hourly in both directions from 5.00 am to 11.00 pm. Apart from the RegionalExpress trains from Munich Hbf the services are provided by regional Class 628 multiples. On weekday mornings two RegionalExpress trains run through to Munich Hbf. They return again in the evening to Simbach am Inn.

Until the implementation of the Linienstern Mühldorf ("Mühldorf route star network") concept in summer 1994 there was through traffic on this line between Bavaria and Austria. This was achieved using a pair of through coaches from Linz to Munich and back. In the final years before its withdrawal the service was shortened on the Austrian side and they only ran as far as Wels.

Since 14 December 2008 through passenger services between Bavaria and Upper Austria have been provided again on this line. A pair of trains consisting of the ÖBB locomotive, BR 2016 "Herkules", and four IC coaches runs every morning from Linz to Munich and back again in the evening, stopping at just a few stations. In addition, between Mühldorf and Linz a direct morning link to Austria and evening return has been established using DB Class 628 multiples which stop at most stations. Regionalbahn trains also run hourly on the line.

Between Julbach and Simbach this line is integrated into the Verkehrsgemeinschaft Rottal-Inn fare scheme.

=== Goods services ===
A transfer train runs three times a week between Mühldorf and Töging, which serves the industrial estate there. This train is usually hauled by a DBAG Class 263 or 294. Another transfer task is carried out on work days between Mühldorf and Simbach in both directions by a Südostbayernbahn locomotive (DB Class 218). In addition several single-freight trains operate services on work days to link the chemical works at Burghausen with Austria and Slovakia. These services are delivered by the DB subsidiary Railion with its Classes 217, 218 and 233. In Simbach the Austrian Federal Railways (ÖBB) take over these trains. A private railway company also uses the line. The Austrian firm of Logistik- and Transport GmbH (LTE) runs a paraffin coke (Petrolkoks) train twice weekly between the Wacker works at Burghausen and Ziar and Hronom (Slovakia) via Bratislava. Class 2016 "Herkules" locomotives are used in single and double-traction.

== Sources ==
- Reinhard Wanka, Wolfgang Wiesner: The Hauptbahn Munich - Simbach and ihre Zweigbahnen, Bufe-Fachbuch-Verlag, Egglham 1996, ISBN 3-922138-59-4
- Bernd Passer: 130 Jahre Eisenbahn Munich – Mühldorf – Simbach, Pro Bahn Verlag, Munich 2001, ISBN 3-9806387-4-X
- Eisenbahnatlas Deutschland 2008, Verlag Schweers + Wall GmbH, Köln Juli 2007, ISBN 978-3-89494-136-9
