= Simbach (Inn) station =

Railway station in Simbach am Inn, Germany

Simbach (Inn)
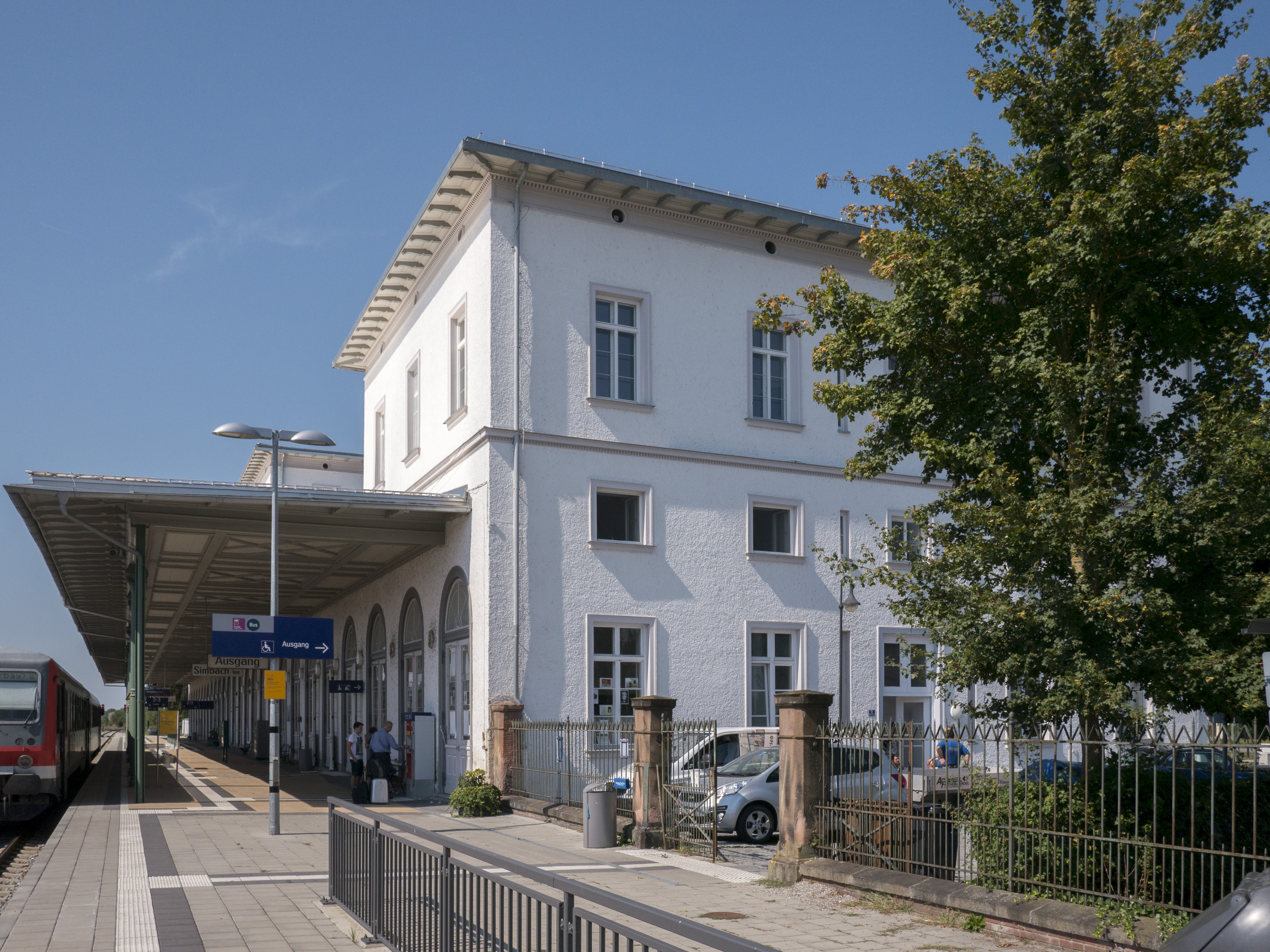
- 2015

General information
- Location: Bahnhofplatz; 84359 Simbach am Inn; Bavaria; Germany
- Coordinates: 48.2631°N 13.0227°E
- Elevation: 348 m (1,142 ft)
- System: Bf
- Owner: Deutsche Bahn
- Operator: DB RegioNetz Infrastruktur
- Lines: Mühldorf–Simbach am Inn railway (KBS 941); Innviertel Railway; Simbach am Inn–Pocking railway
- Platforms: 1 island platform 1 side platform
- Tracks: 10
- Train operators: Südostbayernbahn; ÖBB
- Connections: RE 4; RB 41; 80 6106 6205 6206 6217 6222 7532 7539 7541 7542

Construction
- Parking: yes
- Cycle facilities: yes
- Accessible: yes

Other information
- Station code: -
- DS100 code: MSBI
- IBNR: 8000072
- Category: -

Services
Preceding station		Following station
Julbach towards München Hbf	RE 4 Limited service	Terminus
Julbach towards Mühldorf (Oberbay)	RB 41	Terminus
Preceding station	ÖBB	Following station
Terminus	Regionalzug	Braunau/Inn towards Linz Hbf
Location
- Location within Bavaria Location within Germany Location within Europe

Simbach (Inn) station (German: Bahnhof Simbach (Inn)) is a railway station in the municipality of Simbach am Inn, located in the Rottal-Inn district in Bavaria, Germany.
