= Passau–Neumarkt-Sankt Veit railway =

Railway line in Germany

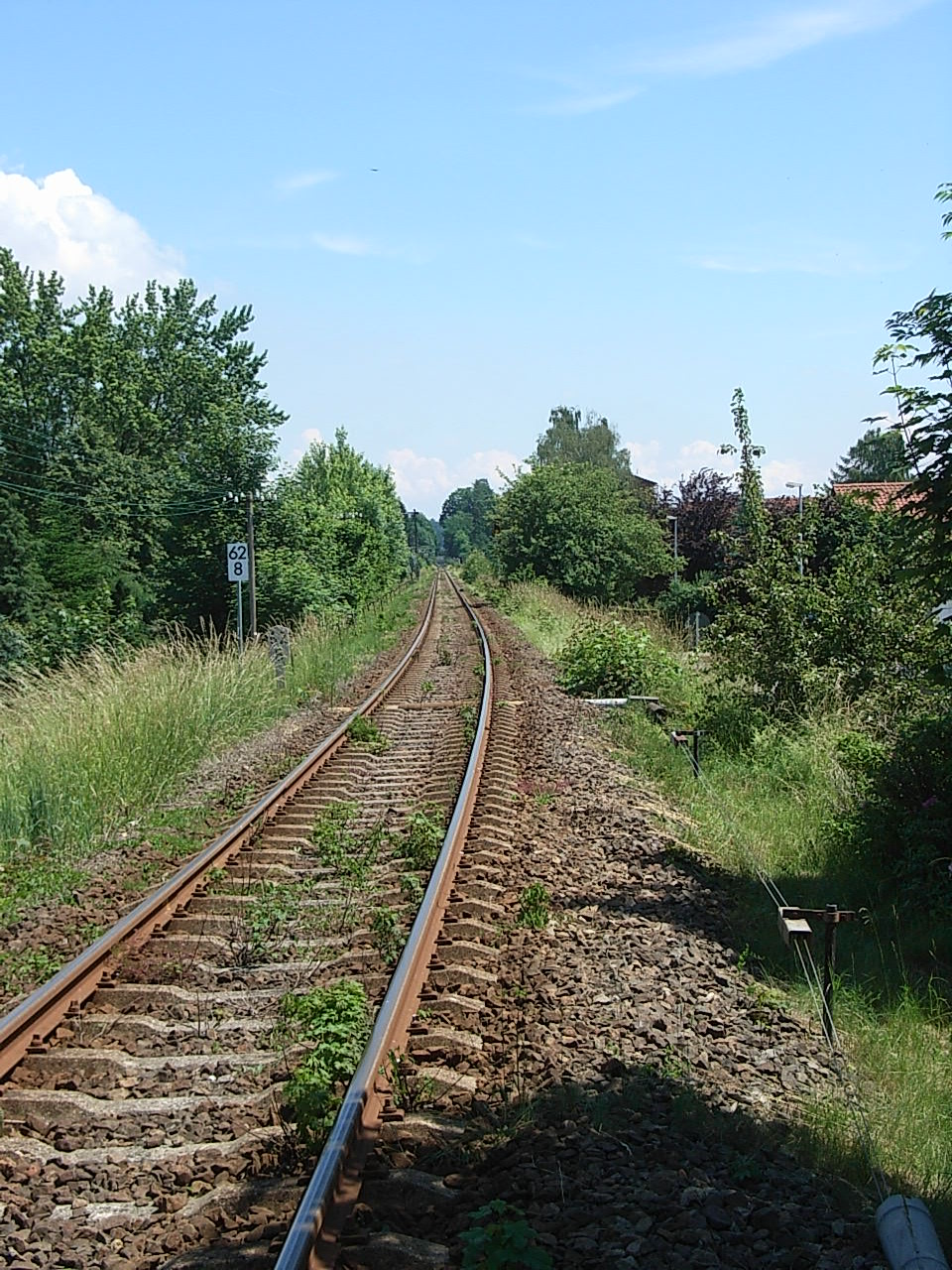
- The 3 km (1.86 mi) long straight from Pfarrkirchen to Anzenkirchen

Overview
- Line number: 5832

Service
- Route number: 946

Technical
- Line length: 97.24 km (60.42 mi)
- Track gauge: 1,435 mm (4 ft 8 1/2 in)
- Operating speed: 80 km/h (49.7 mph) max.

The Passau–Neumarkt-Sankt Veit railway or Rott Valley Railway (Rottalbahn) is a single-tracked, unelectrified branch line in southeastern Bavaria in Germany. At 98 kilometres it is the longest branch line in Bavaria.

== Construction ==
The line was built in two stages. After construction started in 1878 the 63 km long Neumarkt-Sankt Veit–Pocking section was opened on 1 September 1879 as a Sekundärbahn (secondary line). On 4 October 1883 it was given a junction at Landshut. Following the approval of its extension eastwards in 1884, the second, 35 km long, section from Pocking to Passau was completed in the years 1887 and 1888. From 6 October 1888 the route was fully operational from end to end. At 9.15 am on that day a trial train departed from Passau with seven coaches hauled by a D VII. At 2.30 pm it set off from Pocking on the return journey.

The second section was built as a Lokalbahn; it was markedly slower and the trackbed was clearly of lighter and cheaper construction. On 15 October 1888 the Lokalbahn section was opened in both directions with two mixed trains. Once the route from Pocking to Kößlarn was opened on 1 December 1914 it offered a direct linkt to Simbach am Inn.

== Operation ==
On 8 January 1916 at 19.30 passenger train no. 81 crashed down an embankment between Pfenningbach and Neustift due to a landslide. The engine driver died, the fireman was seriously injured, four officials and eight passengers were lightly injured. In the spring of 1933, the only 3 examples of the Class VT 133 railbus from Passau Hauptbahnhof were taken out of service. The 1934 timetable shows that, at that time, of the four passenger trains running daily, three of them were railbuses. The latter took 159 minutes to complete the journey, by contrast the steam train needed 240 minutes, of which 12 to and 15 minutes were required for water stops in Pocking and Pfarrkirchen.

As early as 1977 there were moves to close the line. But tourist traffic to the Lower Bavarian "spa triangle" (Niederbayerisches Bäderdreieck increased its importance again despite the unfavourable routing of the line. There were even through coaches from northern and western Germany to Pocking. On 1 September 1979 the line's centenary was remembered in Pfarrkirchen with special celebrations, not least as a protest against possible plans for closure. Uerdingen railbuses were usually used for scheduled passenger services in the second half of the 20th century.

== Current operation ==
Since the opening of the Mühldorf star network (Liniensterns Mühldorf) in 1994 the route has been worked almost every two hours (from 2001 by the SüdostBayernBahn) with Class 628 multiples on the Passau−Mühldorf route. Certain services offer a direct connexion to other termini on the network. Scheduled train crossings take place in Eggenfelden, Pfarrkirchen, Pocking, Sulzbach/Inn and Fürstenzell. In addition on Saturdays there are through services between Hamburg and Mühldorf, which are especially intended for spa guests staying in the spa triangle of the Rottal-Inn district. From the timetable change in December 2009 it is intended to run hourly fixed-interval services on this route. To achieve that the halt at Massing will be upgraded to a crossing station. These train services will initially continue to be provided by the SOB until December 2016. To realise this project 10 million euros have been spent on upgrading the railway since 2002. As well as investment in the track, the halts have also had money spent on them. The halt at Eggenfelden Mitte was rebuilt nearer the centre of the town, those at Bad Höhenstadt, Neukirchen am Inn and Passau-Neustift were modernised. Fürstenzell station was also renovated for 115,000 euros. Moreover, Sulzbach am Inn, Ruhstorf an der Rott and Engertsham will also be refurbished, for which a further 100,000 euros has been set aside.

== Fares ==
Between Passau and Karpfham the line is integrated into the Passau District Transport Union, between Bayerbach and Massing fares are set by the Rottal-Inn Transport Union.

== Special services ==
Historic railbus sets of the DB Class 798/998 type belonging to the Passau Railway Society make regular appearances on the Rott Valley Railway. No. 798 706-8 was the last VT 798 that worked the route in 1994 as a scheduled passenger train. In addition steam locomotive nos. 638.1301 and 657.2770 with twin-axled Spantenwagen often grace the line.

== Accidents ==
Accidents and near-misses occur frequently at the 100 or so level crossings without barriers. The SüdostBayernBahn is therefore seeking to protect the unsupervised road crossings increasingly with flashing lights and barriers. On 14 August 2008 two motor scooter riders were struck by trains at different places on the line and killed.

== See also ==
- Royal Bavarian State Railways
- Bavarian branch lines
