= Garching an der Alz =

Garching a.d.Alz
- Municipality
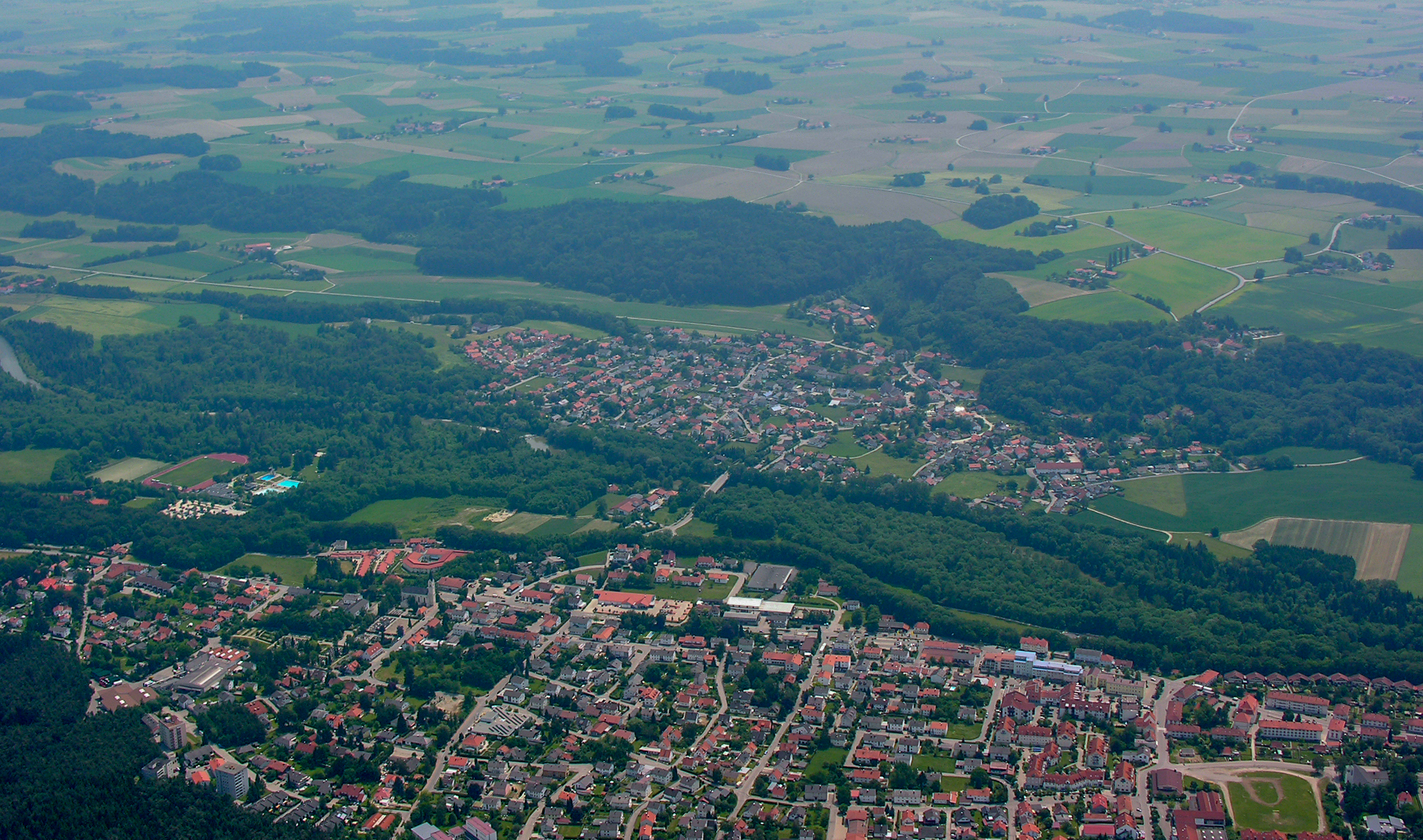
- Aerial view

- Coat of arms

- Location of Garching a.d.Alz within Altötting district
- Interactive map of Garching a.d.Alz
- Location within Germany Location within Bavaria
- Coordinates: 48°07′N 12°35′E
- Country: Germany
- State: Bavaria
- Admin. region: Oberbayern
- District: Altötting

Government
  - Mayor (2020–26): Maik Krieger (CSU)

Area
  - Total: 25.86 km^{2} (9.98 sq mi)
- Elevation: 459 m (1,506 ft)

Population (2025-12-31)
  - Total: 8,546
  - Density: 330.5/km^{2} (855.9/sq mi)
- Time zone: UTC+01:00 (CET)
  - Summer (DST): UTC+02:00 (CEST)
- Postal codes: 84518
- Dialling codes: 08634
- Vehicle registration: AÖ
- Website: www.garching-alz.de

Garching an der Alz (German pronunciation: [ˈɡaʁçɪŋ ʔan deːɐ̯ ˈʔalts], lit. 'Garching on the Alz') is a municipality in the district of Altötting in Bavaria in Germany.
