= Munich–Mühldorf railway =

Railway line in Bavaria, Germany

Overview
- Native name: Bahnstrecke München–Mühldorf
- Line number: 5600 Munich East–Simbach (Inn)
- Locale: Bavaria, Germany

Service
- Route number: 940; 999.2 (S2 Munich East-Markt Schwaben)

Technical
- Line length: 84.676 km (52.615 mi)
- Number of tracks: 2 (Munich–Markt Schwaben, Ampfing–Mühldorf)
- Track gauge: 1,435 mm (4 ft 8 1/2 in) standard gauge
- Electrification: 15 kV/16.7 Hz AC overhead catenary
- Operating speed: 140 km/h (87 mph)

The Munich–Mühldorf railway is a 74 .8 km long main line in the German state of Bavaria, which opened on 1 May 1871. It runs from Munich East station via Markt Schwaben and Dorfen to Mühldorf. The travel time between Munich East and Mühldorf is currently about an hour.

The track is one of the 18 bottlenecks with capacity problems identified under the Bundesschienenwegeausbaugesetz (Federal Railway Infrastructure Development Act) of 1993. In particular the section between Markt Schwaben and Ampfing is one of the busiest single-track lines in Germany. About 3 million tonnes is handled on this single-track, non-electrified route; this is more than one percent of Germany's total rail freight task and in 2015 it will probably be more than two percent.

== Current operations ==
The 21.1 km of line between Munich East and Markt Schwaben is double track and electrified. Between München-Riem West junction and Markt Schwaben the Munich S-Bahn does not have separate tracks and so S-Bahn trains have to share the line. The line speed there is currently 140 km/h and in places only 120 km/h. Electrification ends at Markt Schwaben. The 45 km of line between Markt Schwaben and Ampfing is only single track despite substantial passenger and freight traffic. The section from Ampfing to Altmühldorf has been doubled; work was completed in December 2010 at a cost of around € 50 million. Ampfing station was redesigned as part of this project and received two new exterior platforms and was made fully accessible for the disabled. In addition, the entire upgraded section has been rebuilt with flying junctions to remove at grade crossings; some of this work was done years ago. The final section between Altmühldorf and Mühldorf is only single-track.

The infrastructure manager is DB Netz AG, with the exception of Mühldorf station, which is managed by Südostbayernbahn (SOB), a subsidiary of DB Regio GmbH. Südostbayernbahn operates Regionalbahn and Regional-Express passenger trains made up of class 245 locomotives and class 218 locomotives normally hauling double-deck carriages (some carriages are refurbished Silberling or former InterRegio carriages) or class 628 railcars. In the peak hours, trains run every 20 minutes in order to convey about 15,000 commuters each day, otherwise they run largely hourly. Some stations are not usually served: Weidenbach (served four times a day each way), Walpertskirchen (about every two hours) and Thann-Matzbach (about twelve times a day each way). Two trains a day run non-stop in about 45 minutes between Mühldorf and Munich East. The Munich S-Bahn's line S 2 (Petershausen–Dachau–Munich–Markt Schwaben–Erding) operates partly over the line using class 423 electric multiple units.

Freight traffic is operated, alongside some traffic operated by private companies, by the DB subsidiary DB Schenker Rail with locomotives of class 247. Classes 217, 225 and 232 and 233 had been used before. In particular, freight from the “Bavarian Chemical Triangle” (Bayerisches Chemiedreieck, around Mühldorf) provides a significant volume of freight traffic. Overall, this makes the Markt Schwaben–Mühldorf section (excluding the approximately 8 km long section between Ampfing and Altmühldorf) one of the busiest single-track lines in Germany: it now carries about 3 million tonnes, more than 1 percent of Germany's freight transported by rail; by 2015 an estimated 2 percent rail freight are carried on this single-track, non-electrified line.

The dispatchers at the local stations between Markt Schwaben and Mühldorf are kept busy. The stations of Dorfen and Mühldorf possess electronic interlockings and are equipped with Ks signals (the new system of line-side signalling that has been introduced in Germany since 1993). Ampfing station is equipped with the Ks signals that are controlled by the electronic interlocking centre in Dorfen. Between Markt Schwaben (inclusive) and Munich, the H/V system of signalling (the normal system, first used in 1924) is in operation. The rest of the line has a form of signalling that is over 100 years old.

== Development plans ==
The Munich-Mühldorf line has been included in the Federal Transport Plan (Bundesverkehrswegeplan) since 1985 as part of the development of the Munich–Mühldorf–Freilassing route. The line will in the long term be doubled and electrified, largely using the existing alignment. Only the section between Dorfen and Ampfing would need to be partially realigned to give a continuous design speed of 160 km/h, as the current curves only permit a speed of 120 km/h. This realignment, like the long-planned four-track upgrade to Markt Schwaben and the connection from the New Munich Trade Fair via an S-Bahn link, has apparently not been pursued since 2010. However, the route from Mühldorf to Munich via the so-called Walpertskirchener Spange (Walpertskirchen link) directly to Munich Airport is still planned to greatly improve transport links, especially from eastern and south-eastern Bavaria and Upper Austria and the state of Salzburg to the airport.

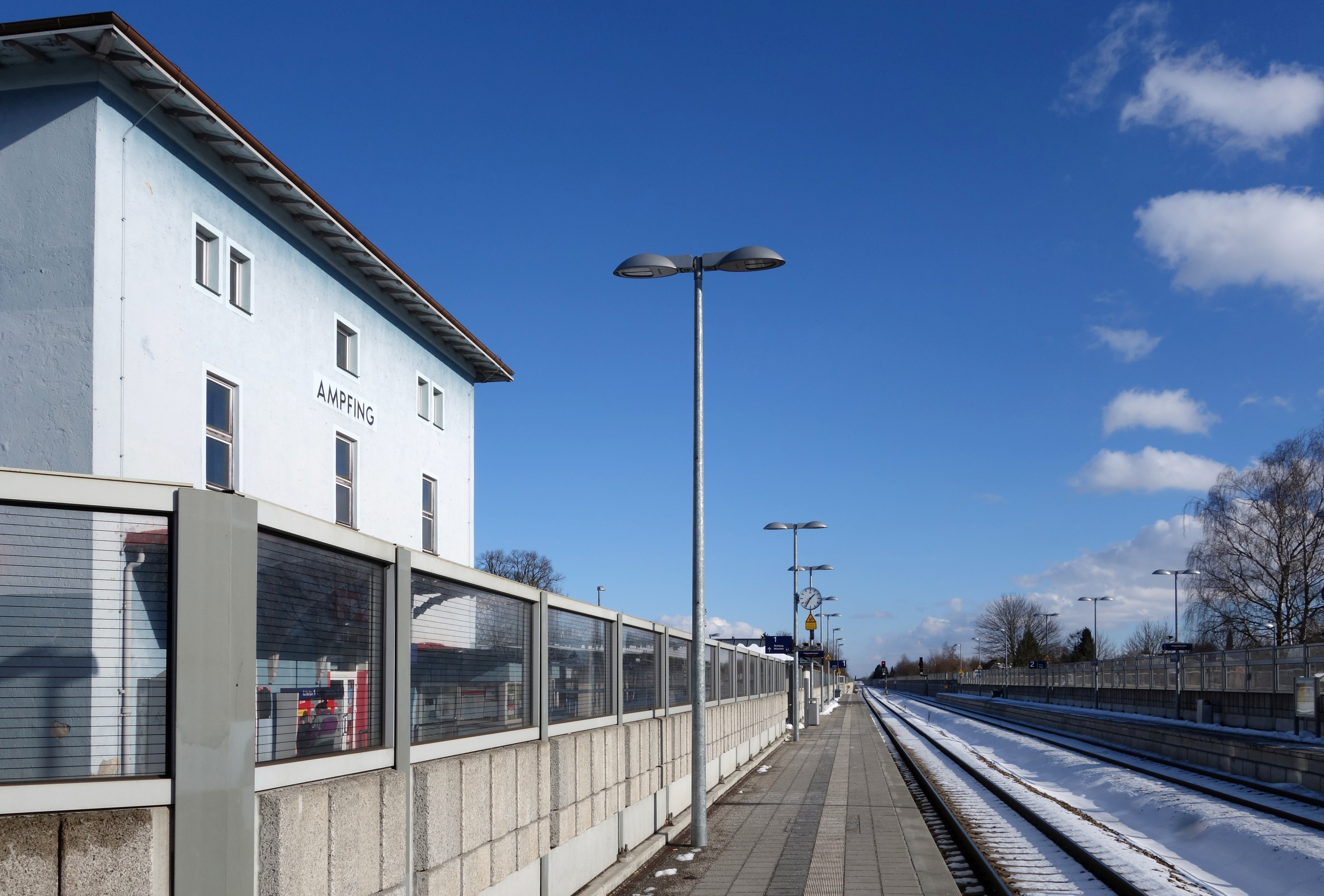
Ampfing station in January 2015 - view towards Mühldorf

The following double track section between Ampfing and Altmühldorf was finished in December 2010 and the 2.2 km section between Altmühldorf and Mühldorf is planned to be duplicated as part of the upgrade of the Mühldorf–Tüßling route, supported with funds from the second economic stimulus package, which is due to be completed in 2016. So far, however, only funds for planning the development have been made available. In addition, two passing points are to be developed as a priority between Markt Schwaben and Hörlkofen (8 km) and between Dorfen and Obergeislbach (11.6 km). However, no planning has been done for this, so realisation before 2020 or even 2025 is unrealistic.

The route from Mühldorf to Freilassing has also been proposed for duplication and electrification since 1985. The branch line from Tüßling to Burghausen would also be electrified as part of this work. The entire Munich–Mühldorf–Freilassing route would be used as an alternative to the Munich–Rosenheim and Rosenheim–Salzburg lines, especially to deal with the expected volume of traffic after the completion of the Brenner Base Tunnel. The line is part of the Magistrale for Europe, which is almost identical with the Trans-European Transport Networks (TEN-T) project No. 17, the upgrade of the Paris–Strasbourg–Stuttgart–Munich–Vienna–Bratislava/Budapest railway axis. While the TEN project between Paris and Bratislava will be almost completed by 2020, on the Munich–Mühldorf–Freilassing section there have been significant planning delays. This section is the longest missing link on the over 1300 km long route between Paris and Bratislava.

The proposed measures would allow a considerable reduction in travel time for local and long-distance traffic and substantial improvements for regional services in southeast Bavaria (integrated regular interval services). Moreover, the industrial enterprises of the Bavarian Chemical Triangle have demanded for quite some time an upgrade of the outdated and congested railway lines. They are also listed as priorities in the Federal Transport Infrastructure Plan in order to improve transport links with Austria. The upgrade of the Munich–Mühldorf–Freilassing route has been estimated to cost € 1.386 billion (as of November 2010). The line would be upgraded for a design speed of between 120 and 160 km/h and the journey time on the Munich–Mühldorf–Salzburg route (147 km) would be halved from the current minimum of 150 minutes to 74 minutes. In comparison, the Munich–Rosenheim–Salzburg route is 153 km long and the Austrian Federal Railways Railjet runs over this route non-stop in 89 minutes.
