= Frontenhausen =

- Municipality
- Coat of arms

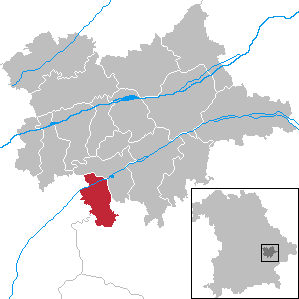
- Location of Frontenhausen within Dingolfing-Landau district
- Interactive map of Frontenhausen
- Location within Germany Location within Bavaria
- Coordinates: 48°33′N 12°32′E
- Country: Germany
- State: Bavaria
- Admin. region: Niederbayern
- District: Dingolfing-Landau

Government
  - Mayor (2020–26): Franz Gassner

Area
  - Total: 86.00 km^{2} (33.20 sq mi)
- Elevation: 412 m (1,352 ft)

Population (2025-12-31)
  - Total: 4,783
  - Density: 55.62/km^{2} (144.0/sq mi)
- Time zone: UTC+01:00 (CET)
  - Summer (DST): UTC+02:00 (CEST)
- Postal codes: 84160
- Dialling codes: 08732
- Vehicle registration: DGF
- Website: www.frontenhausen.de

Frontenhausen is a municipality in the district of Dingolfing-Landau in Bavaria in Germany. It is the filming location for the 2013 crime film Dampfnudelblues.
