= Marklkofen =

- Municipality
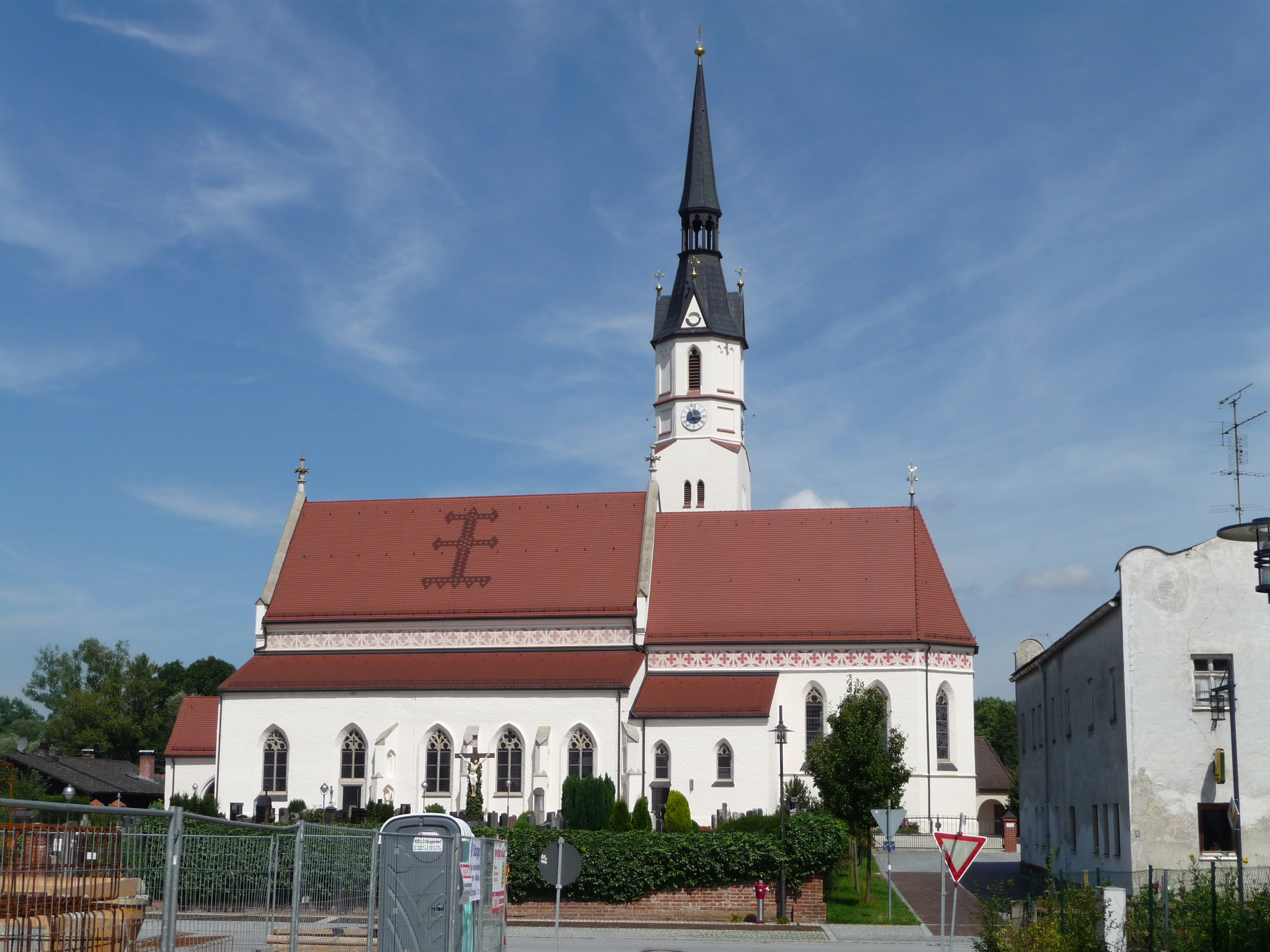
- Church of the Assumption of the Virgin Mary

- Coat of arms

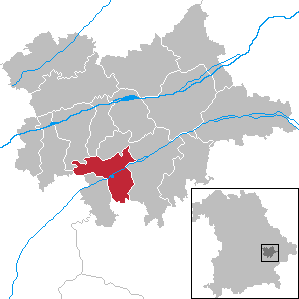
- Location of Marklkofen within Dingolfing-Landau district
- Interactive map of Marklkofen
- Location within Germany Location within Bavaria
- Coordinates: 48°33′N 12°34′E
- Country: Germany
- State: Bavaria
- Admin. region: Niederbayern
- District: Dingolfing-Landau
- Subdivisions: 5 Ortsteile

Government
  - Mayor (2020–26): Peter Eisgruber-Rauscher (CSU)

Area
  - Total: 40.72 km^{2} (15.72 sq mi)
- Elevation: 408 m (1,339 ft)

Population (2025-12-31)
  - Total: 3,834
  - Density: 94.16/km^{2} (243.9/sq mi)
- Time zone: UTC+01:00 (CET)
  - Summer (DST): UTC+02:00 (CEST)
- Postal codes: 84163
- Dialling codes: 08732
- Vehicle registration: DGF
- Website: www.marklkofen.de

Marklkofen is a municipality in the district of Dingolfing-Landau in Bavaria in Germany.
