= Neumarkt-Sankt Veit – Landshut railway =

Railway line in Bavaria, Germany

Overview
- Line number: 5720

Service
- Route number: 945

Technical
- Line length: 38.9 kilometres (24.2 mi)
- Track gauge: 1,435 mm (4 ft 8 1/2 in)
- Operating speed: 120 km/h
Route map
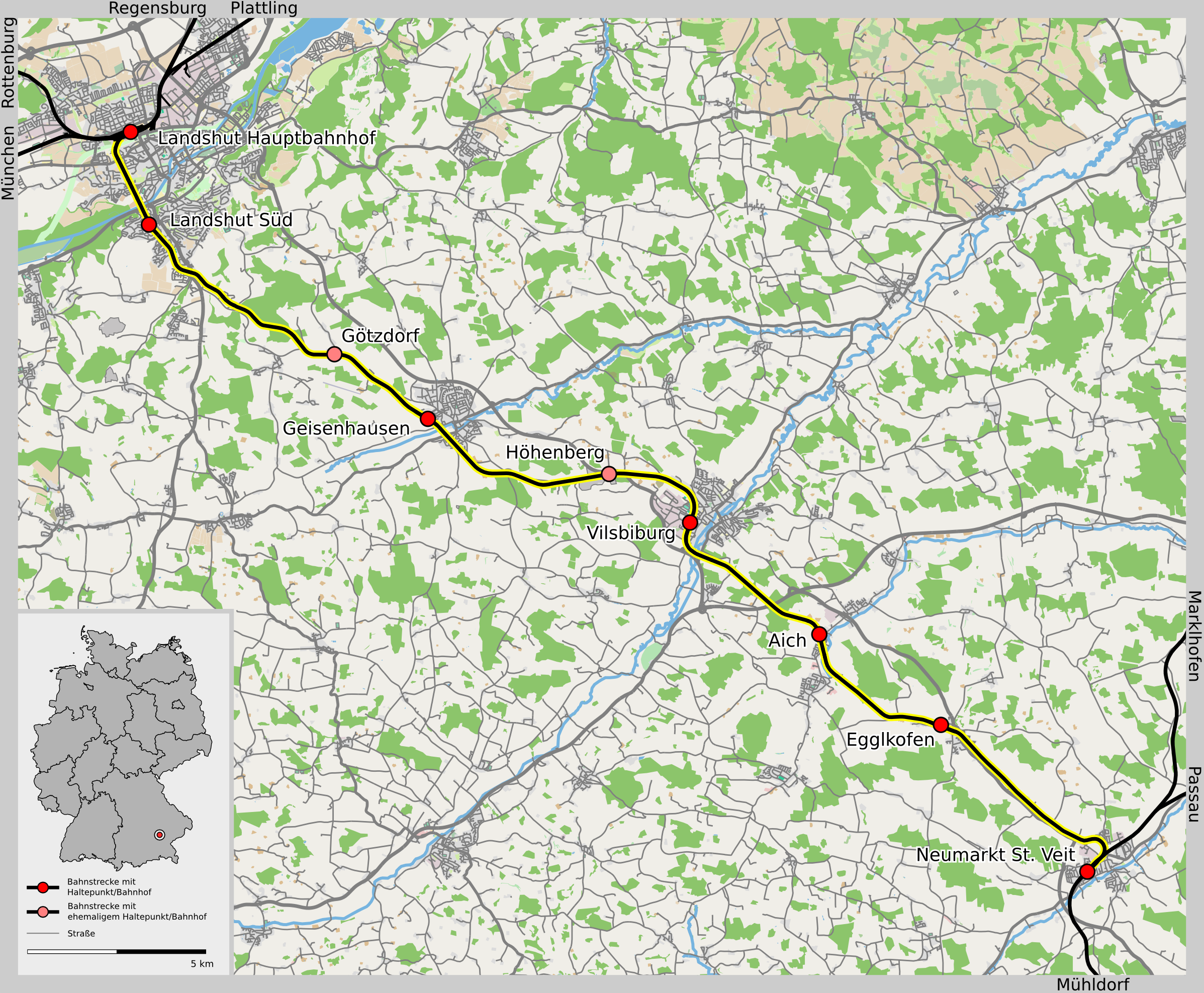

The Neumarkt-Sankt Veit–Landshut railway is a single-tracked, unelectrified main line in Bavaria in southern Germany. It is operated by SüdostBayernBahn (a subsidiary of Deutsche Bahn).

== History ==
Construction of the line from Landshut to Neumarkt a. Rott (now Neumarkt-Sankt Veit) was authorised on 1 February 1880 and the 38.88 km long route was opened on 4 October 1883. Initially the permitted speed on the route was just 30 km/h. On 1 June 1889 the railway was designated as a main line and its top speed raised to 50 km/h.

== Operation ==
In the 2009 timetable 37 passenger trains and 8 goods trains will work the line daily. Regionalbahn trains run generally every hour between Salzburg (every 2 hours), Rosenheim and Landshut. Occasionally trains from Landshut also travel over the Mühldorf–Burghausen railway to Burghausen. Passenger services are provided by Class 628 multiples. Since 10 June 2007 school specials have been introduced to and from Landshut with a DB Class 218 diesel locomotive hauling four double-decker coaches.

== Upgrade ==
On 22 June 2007 the upgrade of the route to handle a top speed of 120 km/h was begun. That will enable, initially from December 2008, almost hourly services from Mühldorf to Landshut. In addition, the platforms at Vilsbiburg, Geisenhausen and Neumarkt-St. Veit will be raised to 55 cm. In 2009 the platform of the halt at Landshut-Süd will be also raised to 55 cm. Additional measures to speed traffic up will mean that in December 2009 there will also be hourly services at the stops en route.

== Sources ==
Eisenbahnen in Niederbayern und der Oberpfalz, Walther Zeitler, Buch&Kunstverlag Oberpfalz, Amberg 1985/1997, ISBN 3-924350-61-2

== See also ==
- Royal Bavarian State Railways
- List of scheduled railway routes in Germany
- List of railway stations in Bavaria
