= Simbach am Inn =

- Town
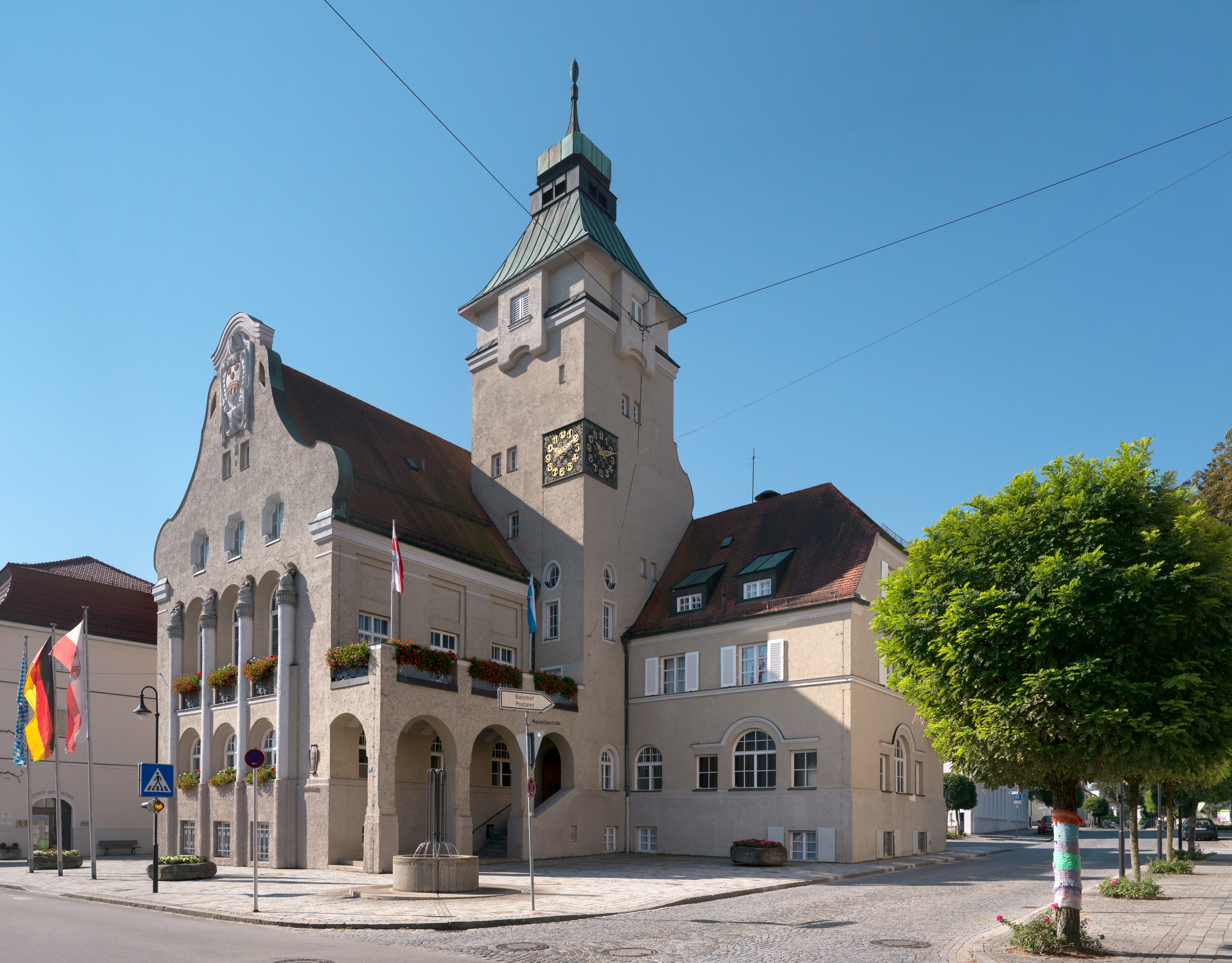
- Town hall

- Flag Coat of arms

- Location of Simbach am Inn within Rottal-Inn district
- Interactive map of Simbach am Inn
- Location within Germany Location within Bavaria
- Coordinates: 48°16′N 13°1′E
- Country: Germany
- State: Bavaria
- Admin. region: Niederbayern
- District: Rottal-Inn
- Subdivisions: 4 Stadtteile

Government
  - Mayor (2020–26): Klaus Schmid (CSU)

Area
  - Total: 47.33 km^{2} (18.27 sq mi)
- Elevation: 345 m (1,132 ft)

Population (2025-12-31)
  - Total: 10,311
  - Density: 217.9/km^{2} (564.2/sq mi)
- Time zone: UTC+01:00 (CET)
  - Summer (DST): UTC+02:00 (CEST)
- Postal codes: 84359
- Dialling codes: 08571
- Vehicle registration: PAN
- Website: www.simbach.de

Simbach am Inn (German pronunciation: [ˈzɪmbax ʔam ˈʔɪn], lit. 'Simbach on the Inn') is a town on the River Inn in the Rottal-Inn district of Bavaria, Germany. The Austrian city Braunau am Inn lies on the opposite side of the river from Simbach.

== History ==
Simbach was one of the first places in which electricity was used. For example, Simbach had electrical power three years before Munich.

One of the reasons for Simbach's growth is that it lies on the railway from Munich to Vienna.

=== Timeline ===
- 927 - Simbach first appears in historical records as "Sunninpah."
- 1743 - Simbach is nearly destroyed during the War of the Austrian Succession.
- 1833 - Simbach becomes an independent municipality.
- 1951 - Simbach is raised to city status, making it the youngest city in the Rottal-Inn district.
- 1972 - The municipalities Kirchberg, Eggstetten and Erlach are added to Simbach.

== Geography ==
=== Schellenberg ===
Schellenberg is a hill north of town. At over 549 meters in height, it is the tallest hill between the Inn and Rott. The hill provides views of the Inn Valley, the neighbouring Upper Austria and (on clear days) the distant Alps.

== Culture ==
=== Maria Himmelfahrt Parish Church ===
This church, in the Erlach district, ranks among the most important church buildings in the region. It holds an elaborate high altar.

=== Rathaus (City Hall) ===
The Rathaus, built in Art Nouveau style, was restored in 1987.

=== Festivals ===
Pfingstdult is a popular annual festival. Every year, it is accompanied by an industrial exhibition.

The annual City festival takes place last Sunday in June.

The "Angling celebration" takes place each year on the first weekend in September.

"Leonhardiritt" is a horse pro assignment and takes place each year in October.

The Advent season is celebrated in a ceremony spanning nine days with 1000 participants.

=== Twin Cities ===
- Since 1982, Simbach is twinned with the town of Skipton in North Yorkshire, United Kingdom.
- Since 2001, Simbach is twinned with the town of Tolmezzo in the Friaul region of Italy.

== Geothermal power ==
Forty MW of electricity is generated from geothermal heat sources tapped 2,000 meters beneath the planet. Both Simbach and Braunau make use of this renewable resource.

== Census statistics ==
Simbach has approximately 10,000 residents. Nearly 15% of them are younger than 18 years, 45% are between 18 and 50 years old, and 40% are older than 50 years.

== Politics ==
The mayor of Simbach is Klaus Schmid (CSU). There are twenty-five seats on the town council; a total of four parties are represented. With 15 seats, the CSU is the biggest party in the town council. The SPD, Alliance '90/The Greens and free voters divide the remaining ten seats.

== Transport ==
Simbach lies near the incomplete highway A94. There are train connections at the Simbach (Inn) station to Munich, Vienna, Salzburg, and Passau.

The closest major airports are the Munich International Airport and the Salzburg Airport, each about a one-hour drive by car.

== International relations ==
Simbach am Inn is twinned with:

- (United Kingdom) Skipton, England
- Tolmezzo, Italy
