= Bad Endorf station =

Railway station in Bad Endorf, Germany

Bad Endorf
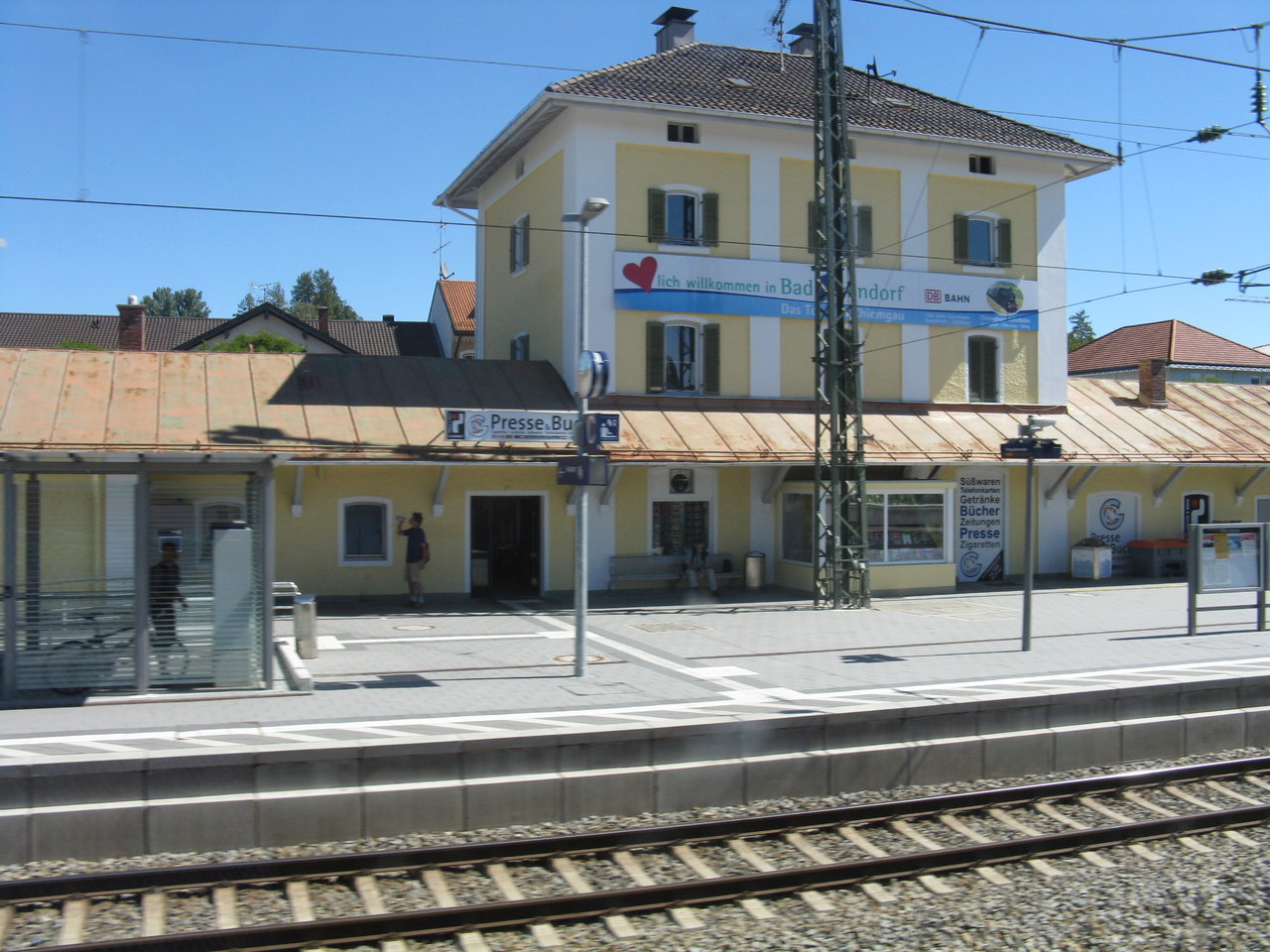
- 2012

General information
- Location: Bahnhofplatz 4; 83093 Bad Endorf; Bavaria; Germany
- Coordinates: 47.905°N 12.302°E
- Owner: Deutsche Bahn
- Operator: DB Netz; DB Station&Service
- Line: Rosenheim–Salzburg railway
- Platforms: 2 side platforms
- Tracks: 3
- Train operators: Bayerische Regiobahn

Construction
- Accessible: Yes

Other information
- Station code: 274
- DS100 code: MBEF
- IBNR: 8001787
- Category: 4
- Website: www.bahnhof.de

History
- Opened: 7 May 1860; 166 years ago

Services
Preceding station	DB Fernverkehr	Following station
Rosenheim towards München Hbf	EC 62	Prien am Chiemsee towards Salzburg Hbf or Vienna Airport
Preceding station		Following station
Rosenheim towards München Hbf	RE 5	Prien am Chiemsee towards Salzburg Hbf
Location
- Location within Bavaria Location within Germany Location within Europe

Bad Endorf station is a railway station in the municipality of Bad Endorf, located in the Rosenheim district in Bavaria, Germany.
