= Chiemgau Railway =

Railway line in Bavaria, Germany

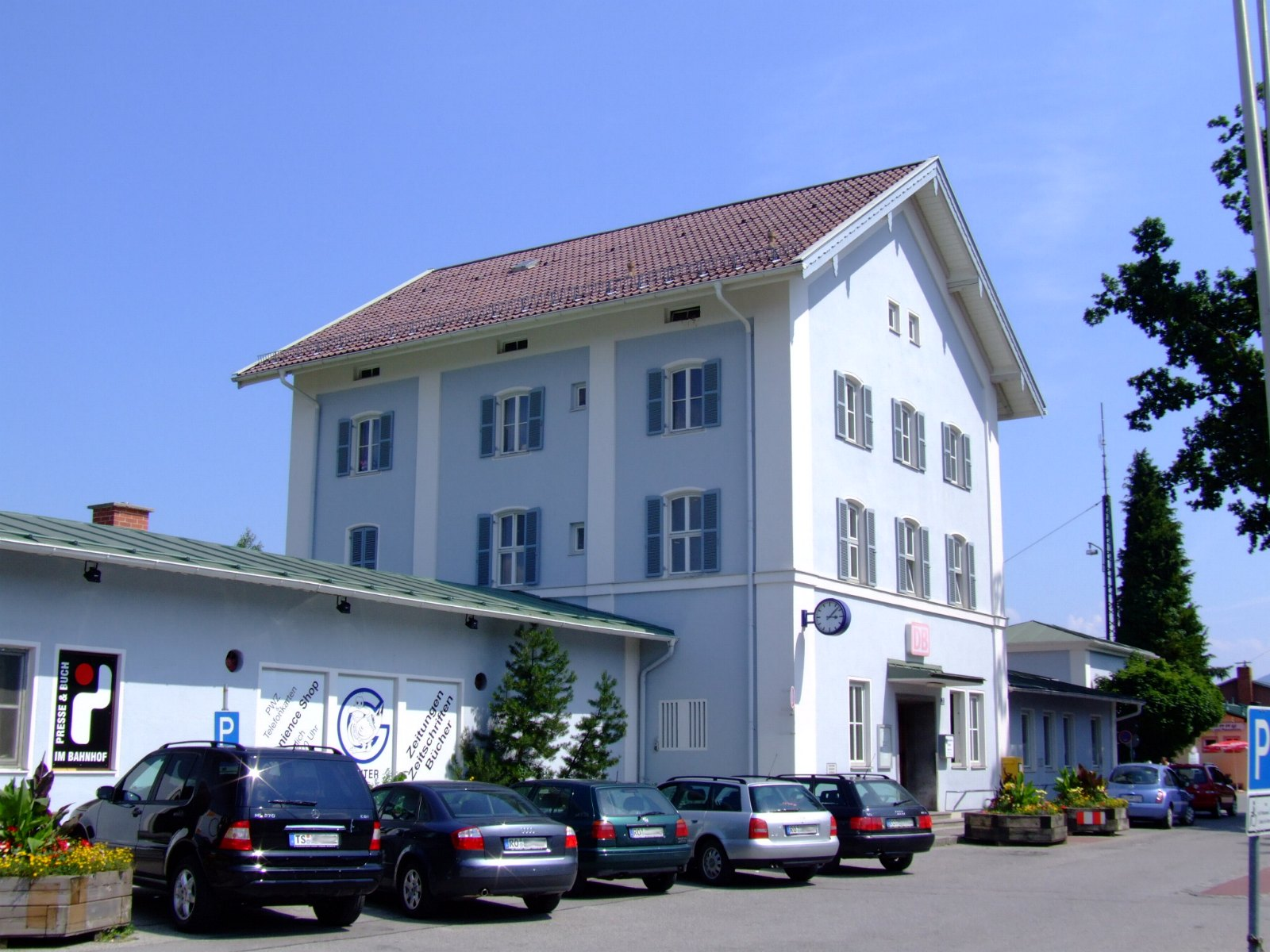

The Chiemgau Railway (German: Chiemgaubahn) is a single-tracked, 9.6-kilometre-long (6.0 mi) railway line between Prien am Chiemsee and Aschau im Chiemgau in the state of Bavaria in southern Germany. It is timetabled as route no. 952.

== Operation and History ==
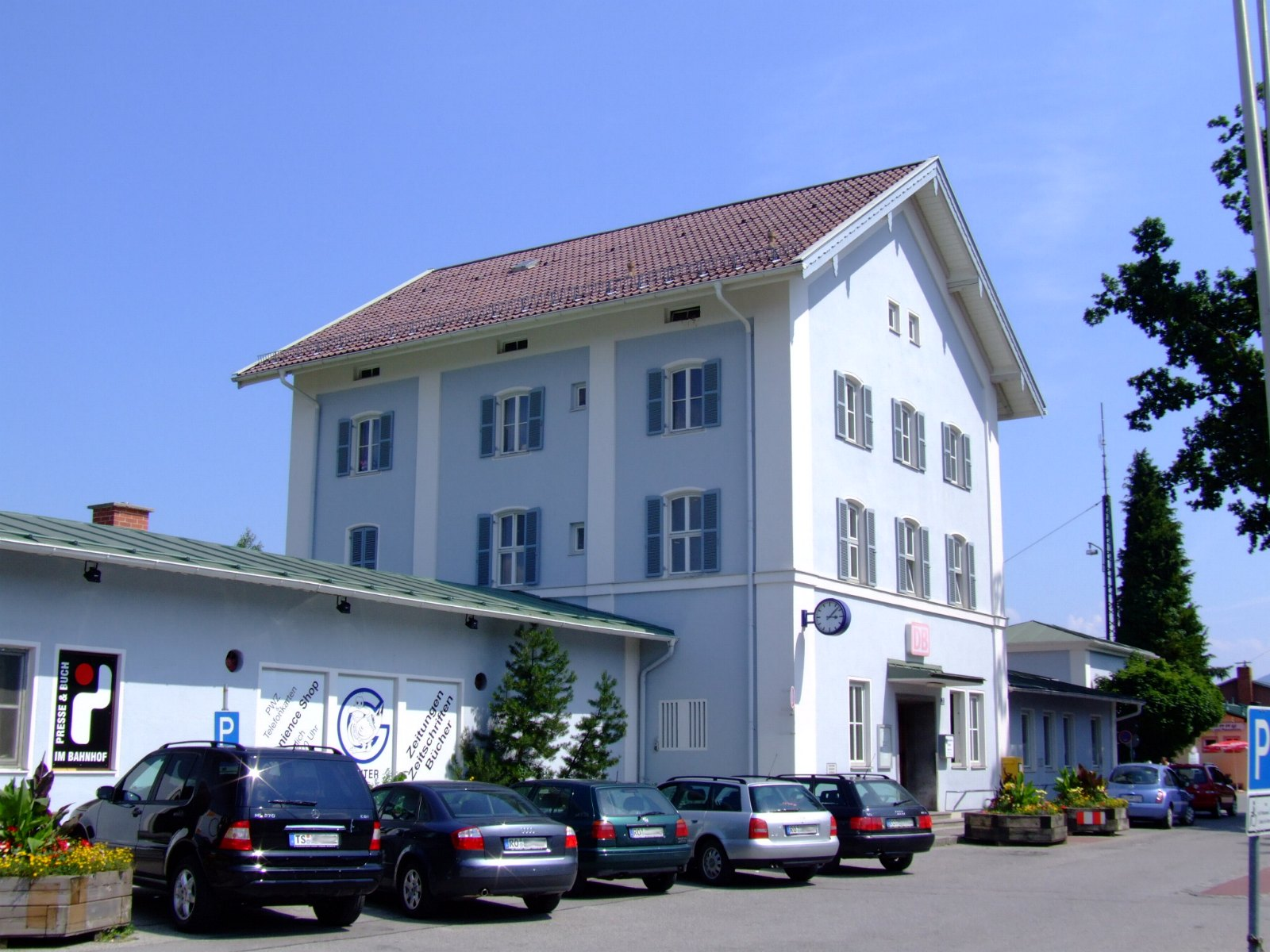
Prien station

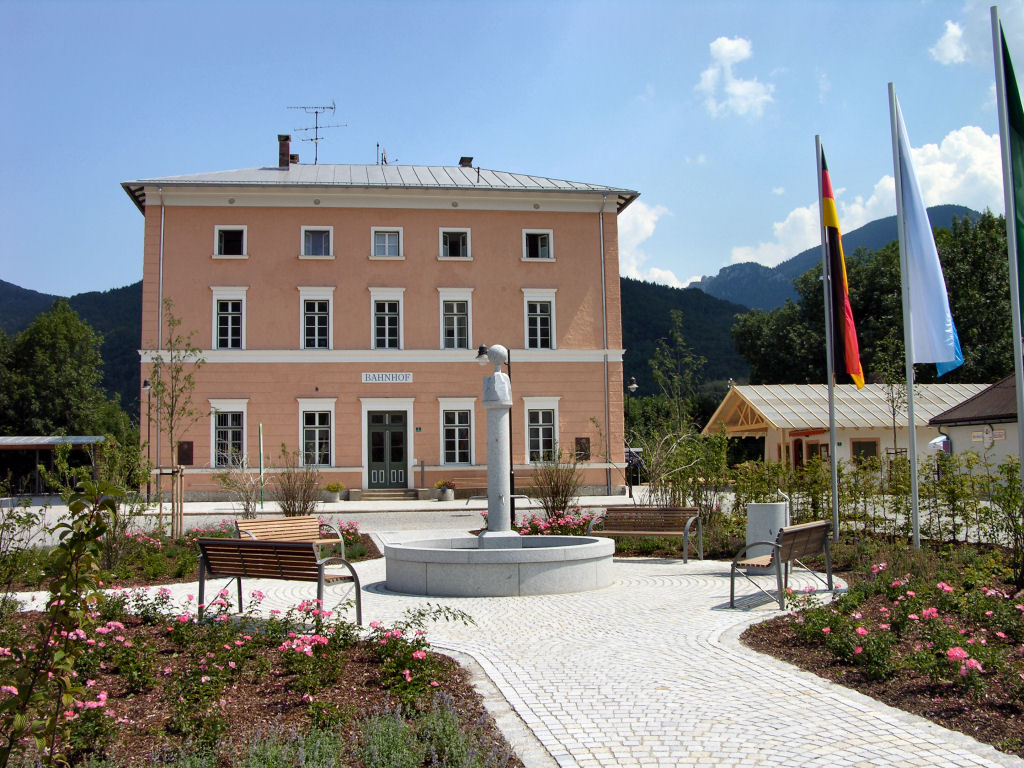
Aschau station

In 1875 after Theodor von Cramer-Klett had purchased Hohenaschau Castle and its associated property in the valley of the River Prien, he financed the construction of a railway line to Aschau. It was opened on 18 August 1878 and opened up the Prien valley to the main line from Munich to Salzburg.

In the post-war period the line was worked by railbuses of Class VT 98. In 1987 these were modernised by the repair shop at Kassel and painted in white and mint-green livery. These modernised Chiemgau Railway railbuses were the only ones in the Bundesbahn fleet to be given a special paint scheme - all the others were painted in the red livery, then typical of multiples operated by the DB. The former Chiemgau Railway vehicles are in service today in tourist trains on the Kleinengstingen–Münsingen–Schelklingen–Ulm Hbf route (KBS 759) and known as the Ulmer Spatz (Ulm sparrows). As a result of this uniqueness there are several models by model railway manufacturers of the Chiemgau railbuses.

In 1996 the Chiemgau Railway railbuses (798 652 and 798 653) were replaced by Class 628.4 units. At present RegionalBahn trains work the line from Aschau to Prien (one or two pairs of trains per hour). The 628s need 15 minutes for the ten-kilometre (six-mile) long line. In the mornings and evenings there are trains that run via Prien to Rosenheim on the Munich–Salzburg line. In addition one train runs through each evening from Salzburg via Traunstein to Aschau.

== See also ==
- Royal Bavarian State Railways
- Bavarian branch lines

== Sources ==
- de:Chiemgaubahn
