= Prien am Chiemsee station =

Railway station in Bavaria, Germany

Prien am Chiemsee
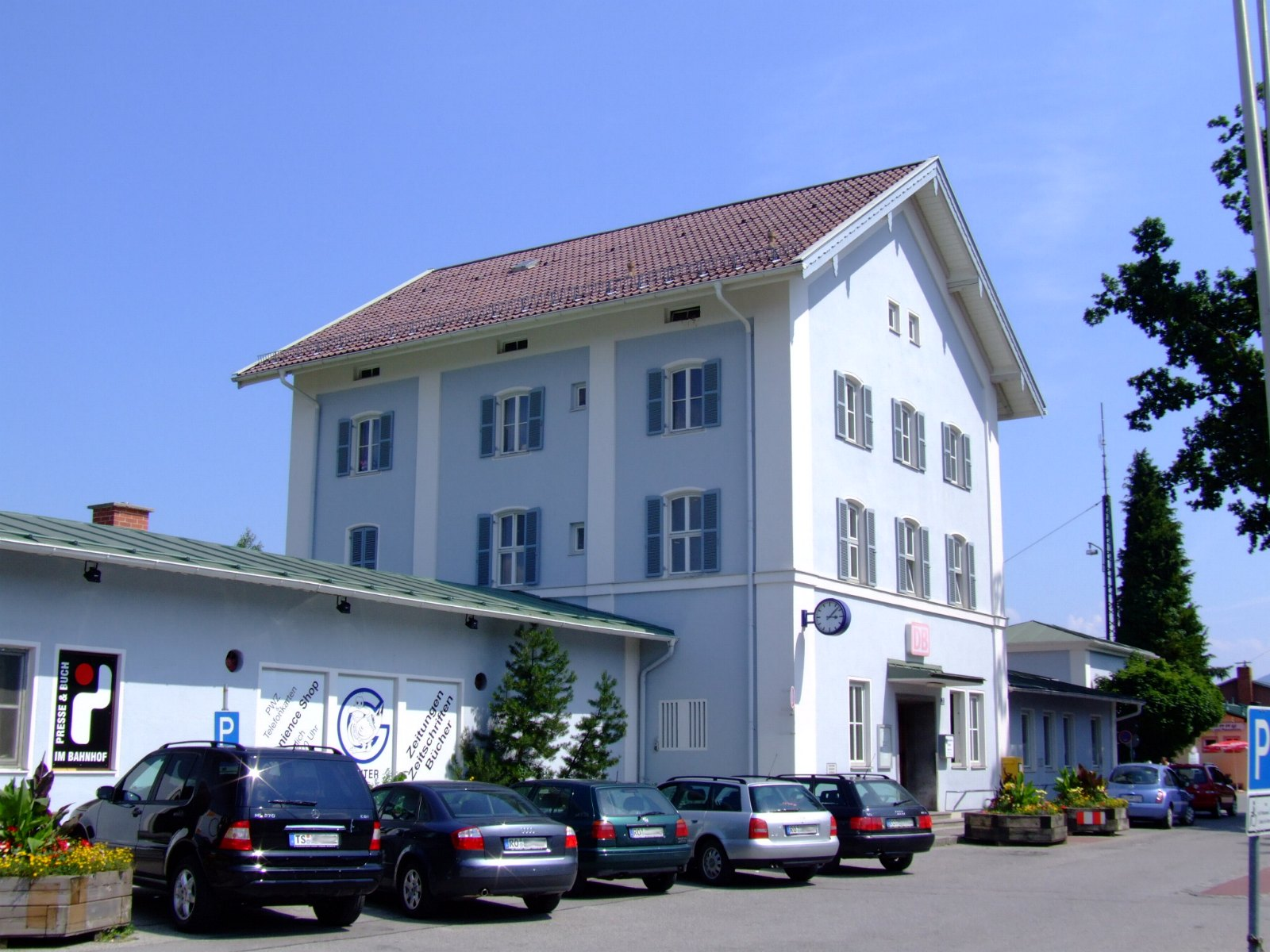

General information
- Location: Bahnhofplatz 2, Prien am Chiemsee, Bavaria; Germany
- Coordinates: 47°51′20″N 12°20′48″E
- Owner: Deutsche Bahn
- Operator: DB Netz; DB Station&Service
- Lines: Rosenheim–Salzburg (KBS 951); Prien am Chiemsee–Aschau (Chiemgau Railway) (KBS 952); Prien–Prien Stock (Chiemsee Railway) (heritage railway)
- Platforms: 4, including a bay platform

Construction
- Accessible: Yes

Other information
- Station code: 5035
- DS100 code: MPR
- IBNR: 8004885
- Category: 4
- Website: stationsdatenbank.de; www.bahnhof.de

History
- Opened: 7 May 1860

Services
Preceding station	DB Fernverkehr	Following station
Rosenheim towards Frankfurt (Main) Hbf or Münster Hbf	ICE 62	Traunstein towards Graz Hbf
Rosenheim towards München Hbf	EC 62	Traunstein towards Salzburg Hbf or Vienna Airport
Preceding station		Following station
Bad Endorf towards München Hbf	RE 5	Bernau am Chiemsee towards Salzburg Hbf
Preceding station		Following station
Terminus	RB 52	Urschalling towards Aschau (Chiemgau)
Location
- Location within Bavaria Location within Germany Location within Europe

Prien am Chiemsee station is the largest station of the Bavarian market town of Prien am Chiemsee. The station was opened in 1860 and is classified by Deutsche Bahn as a category 4 station. It has four platform tracks, one of which is a bay platform. It is served by about 85 Deutsche Bahn trains each day. The station is a separation station and is located on the Rosenheim–Salzburg, Chiemgau Railway (Chiemgaubahn) and the Chiemsee Railway (Chiemseebahn).

Prien am Chiemsee also contains the terminus of the Chiemsee Railway to Prien-Stock, which is called the Prien (Stock) station.

== Location ==
The station is located to the east of central Prien am Chiemsee. The station building faces toward the town centre and is located to the west of the railway. The address of the station is Bahnhofsplatz 2. Seestraße runs under the tracks to the north of the station. To the west Hochriesstraße runs from the Bahnhofsplatz (station forecourt), branching off Seestraße. East of the station area is Hallwangerstraße and on the other side of the street are the tracks of the Chiemsee Railway.

== History ==
Prien station was opened on 7 May 1860 with the opening of the line from Rosenheim to Traunstein, which was extended to Salzburg on 1 August 1860. After the commissioning of the station, Prien was only a small town. On 18 August 1878 the station became a railway junction with the opening of the secondary railway (Vizinalbahn) to Aschau (the Chiemgau Railway). At the same time the station's tracks were rebuilt. The station now had six tracks and three platforms: a bay platform, a through track next to the "home" platform (Hausbahnsteig, that is next to the station building), two through tracks on either side of an island platform and two freight tracks. In addition, there were a local freight facility with a loading track connecting towards Salzburg, a wagon turntable and two tracks ending at buffers. On 9 July 1887, the Chiemsee Railway was opened from Prien am Chiemsee to Prien-Stock on the edge of the lake, Chiemsee. In the following years traffic to the station grew because of the construction of the new Herrenchiemsee palace, which was completed in 1885. A signal box was built in 1891 and the first interlocking was installed in 1892. The mechanical interlocking was completed on 4 February 1899; already another signal box and a controlling signal box had been opened in the station building. Platform canopies, a separate station for Chiemsee Railway on the east side of the station and a platform underpass were built from 1909 to 1911. Deutsche Bundesbahn stationed a locomotive of class 323 in Prien for local freight traffic after the Second World War. Deutsche Bundesbahn replaced the mechanical interlocking with a relay interlocking on 20 March 1963 for 552,000 Deutsche Mark. The section of track maintained by the office of the track master (Bahnmeisterei) was extended on 31 May 1968 so that the Bahnmeisterei in Bad Endorf could close. In 1976, the station lost the class 323 locomotive, which was transferred to the Rosenheim depot. On 1 May 1979, the Prien Bahnmeisterei was closed and its section of line was taken over by the Rosenheim Bahnmeisterei. The station's name was changed from Prien to Prien am Chiemsee on 27 May 1990 and the local freight facility was closed on 1 June 1997. The station's signals have been remotely controlled from the Rosenheim electronic signal box since 3 November 2003. A travel centre was opened in the station building on 19 December 2007.

== Infrastructure ==
The station has four platform tracks on two platforms, with platform 1 located next to the station building and platform 1a (a bay platform) attached to it. All platforms are 55 centimetres high and the platforms for tracks 1 to 3 are 387 metres long, but track 1a is only 222 metres long. In addition, all platforms are covered. However, they are not accessible for the disabled and only partially fitted with digital train destination indicators. The island platform for tracks 2 and 3 is connected by a tunnel to platform 1. Next to the station forecourt there are park-and-ride spaces and a bus stop. The station building has a travel centre.

Track 1a is used by Regionalbahn trains running to Aschau. Track 1 is served by long-distance and regional services towards Salzburg and track 2 is served by long-distance and regional services towards Munich. Track 3 is no longer used by scheduled trains and, except in exceptional cases, is used as a passing loop.

== Rail services ==
The station's long-distance services are InterCity and EuroCity trains between Munich and Austria, operating as ICE 62 or EC 62.

Regional traffic stopping at the station includes an hourly Regional-Express (RE5) service between Munich and Salzburg. These consist of double-deck push–pull trains propelled by class 111 locomotives operated by Bayerische Regiobahn. In addition, hourly Regionalbahn (RB52) services to and from Aschau connect with the Regional-Express to and from Munich. This service is operated by SüdostBayernBahn with class 628 diesel multiple units.

In the 2026 timetable, the following services stopped at the station:

Line	Route		Frequency
ICE 62	Frankfurt – Darmstadt – Heidelberg –	Stuttgart – Ulm – Augsburg – Munich – Rosenheim – Rosenheim – Prien – Salzburg – Villach – Klagenfurt – Graz	2 train pairs
ICE 62	Münster – Essen – Düsseldorf – Köln Messe/Deutz – Frankfurt Airport – Mannheim –	Stuttgart – Ulm – Augsburg – Munich – Rosenheim – Rosenheim – Prien – Salzburg – Villach – Klagenfurt – Graz	One train pair
EC/RJ 62	Munich – Rosenheim – Rosenheim – Prien – Traunstein – Salzburg (– Villach – Klagenfurt – Graz – Vienna – Vienna Airport)		2 train pairs to Salzburg, 1 train pair to Vienna
RE 5	Munich – Grafing – Rosenheim – Bad Endorf – Prien – Traunstein – Freilassing – Salzburg		Hourly
RE 5	Munich – Rosenheim – Bad Endorf – Prien – Traunstein		4 train pairs in the peak
RB 52	Prien – Aschau		Hourly

== Gallery ==
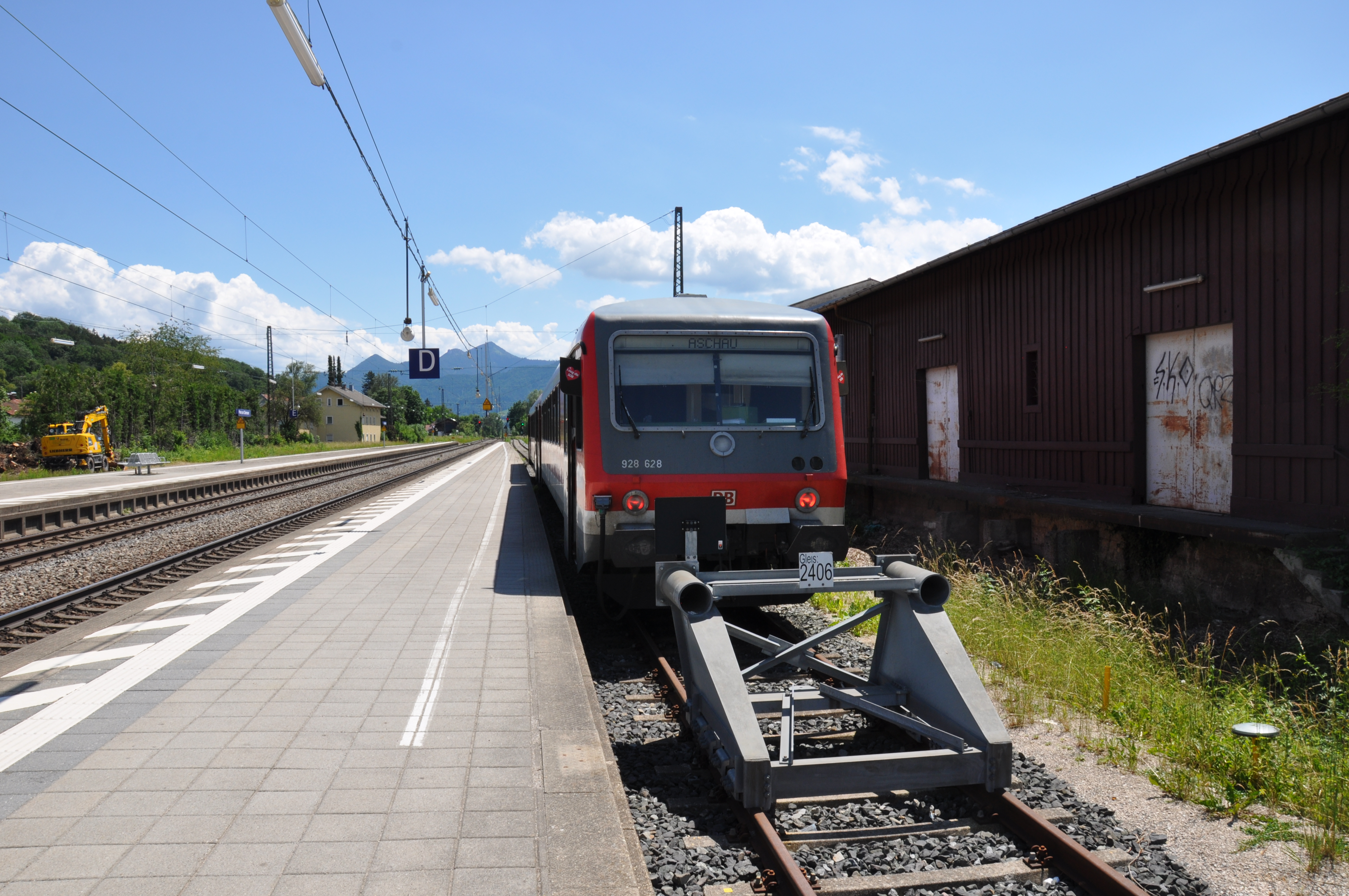
Class 928 as RB 52

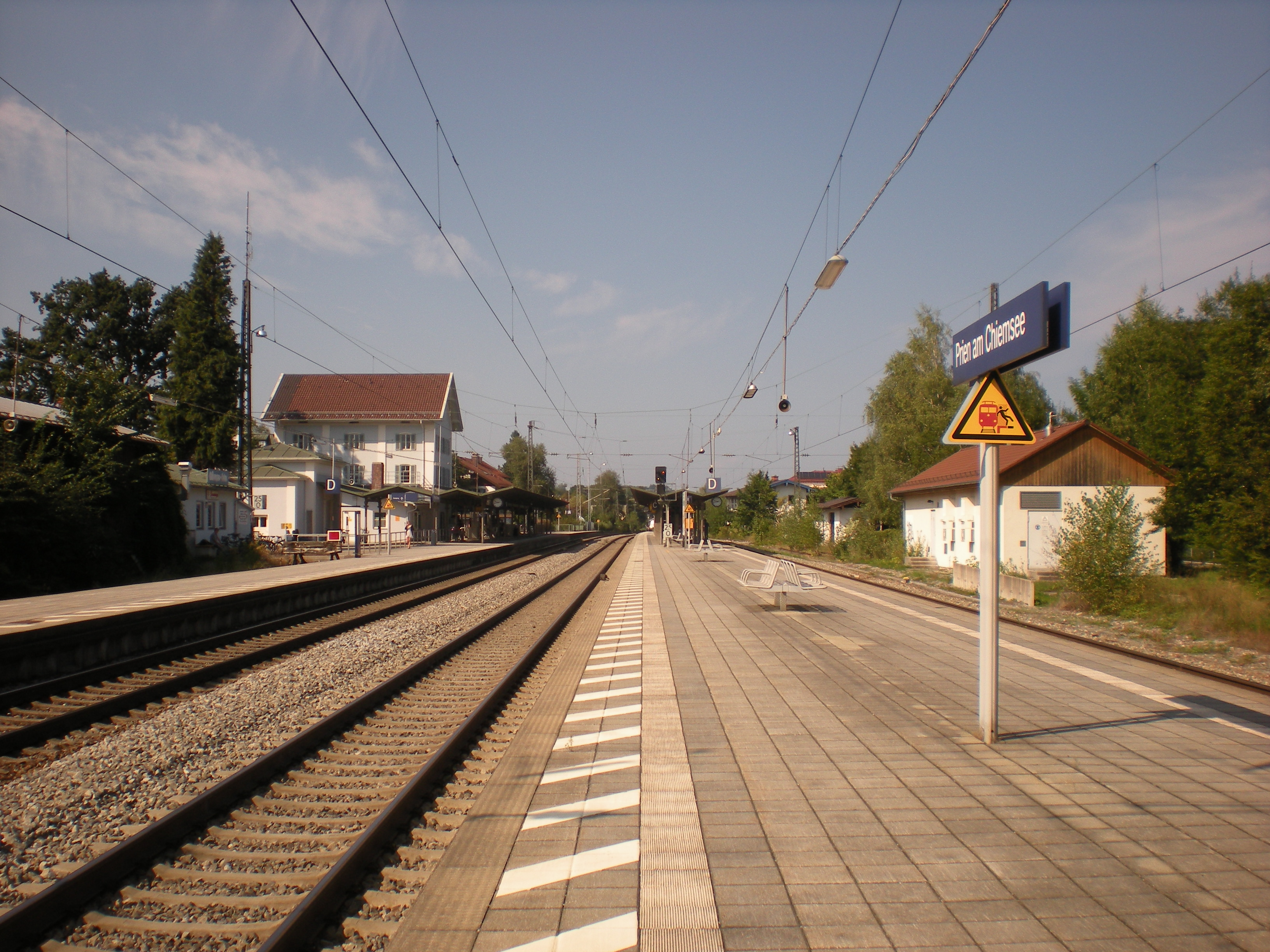
Platforms (2012)
