= Kufstein railway station =

Railway station in Tyrol, Austria

Kufstein
- Aerial view of the station in 2017

General information
- Location: Südtiroler Platz; 6330 Kufstein; Austria
- Coordinates: 47°34′59″N 12°09′57″E
- Owner: Austrian Federal Railways (ÖBB)
- Operator: ÖBB Infra
- Lines: Lower Inn Valley railway Rosenheim–Kufstein railway
- Distance: 2.339 km (1.453 mi) from Germany–Austria border
- Platforms: 3 (long distance platforms); 5 (bay platforms)
- Connections: Bus: City buses Regional buses

History
- Opened: 1876; 150 years ago
- Rebuilt: 1980
- Electrified: 15 July 1927; 99 years ago

Services
Preceding station	ÖBB	Following station
Wörgl Hbf towards Bregenz	Railjet Express	Salzburg Hbf towards Vienna Airport
Wörgl Hbf towards Innsbruck Hbf	Railjet Express	Salzburg Hbf towards Vienna Airport
Wörgl Hbf towards Zürich HB	Railjet Express	Salzburg Hbf towards Vienna Airport
Wörgl Hbf towards Zürich HB	Railjet Express	Salzburg Hbf towards Bratislava hl.st.
Wörgl Hbf towards Zürich HB	Railjet Express	Salzburg Hbf towards Budapest Keleti
Rosenheim towards München Hbf	EuroCity	Wörgl Hbf towards Bologna Centrale
Rosenheim towards München Hbf	EuroCity	Wörgl Hbf towards Rimini
Rosenheim towards München Hbf	EuroCity	Wörgl Hbf towards Verona Porta Nuova
Rosenheim towards München Hbf	EuroCity	Wörgl Hbf towards Innsbruck Hbf
Wörgl Hbf towards Innsbruck Hbf	Nightjet	Rosenheim towards Amsterdam Centraal or Hamburg-Altona
Wörgl Hbf towards Innsbruck Hbf	CJX 1	Terminus
Schaftenau towards Innsbruck Hbf	REX 2	Terminus
Preceding station	DB Fernverkehr	Following station
Wörgl Hbf towards Innsbruck Hbf	ICE 11	Rosenheim towards Berlin Gesundbrunnen
Preceding station		Following station
Salzburg Hbf toward Innsbruck Hbf	WESTblue	Wörgl Hbf toward Wien Westbahnhof
Preceding station		Following station
Kiefersfelden towards München Hbf	RB 54	Terminus
Preceding station	Tyrol S-Bahn	Following station
Schaftenau towards Telfs-Pfaffenhofen	S4	Terminus
Location
- Location within Austria Location within Europe

Kufstein railway station serves the city of Kufstein, in the Kufstein district of the Austrian federal state of Tyrol. Opened in 1876, it is an Austrian-German border station, close to the border between Tyrol and Bavaria.

The station forms part of the Lower Inn Valley railway, and is also a terminus of the Rosenheim–Kufstein railway. It is owned and operated by the Austrian Federal Railways (ÖBB).

== Location ==
Kufstein railway station is situated in Südtiroler Platz, right in the heart of the city, on the west bank of the Inn river.

== History ==
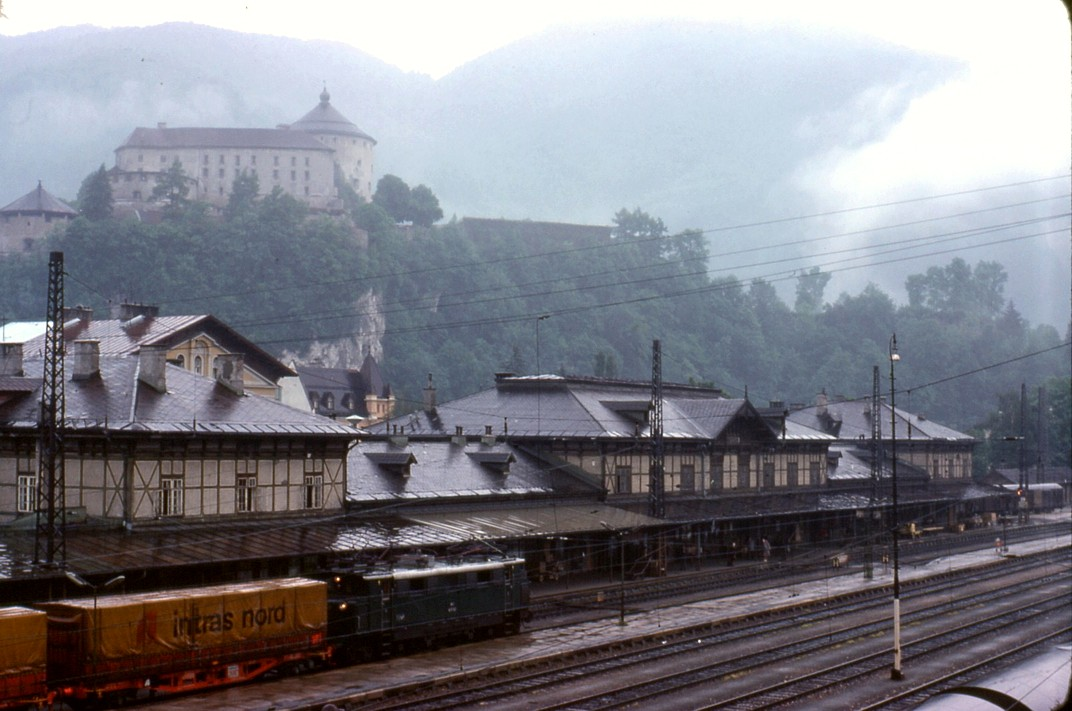
The station in 1978 with the Kufstein Fortress in the background.

In 1858, a railway was opened between Rosenheim and Innsbruck via Kufstein. However, it was not until 1876 that a station was built in Kufstein. In 1980, the city's original station building was completely replaced by what was, for that time, quite a modern structure.

At the start of the 1980s, the other facilities at the station were similarly comprehensively rebuilt. As part of the renovations, the pedestrian bridge in Kufstein's locality of Zell was moved a few hundred metres (yards) to the south.

A new park-and-ride facility has been built on the west side of the station, and the platforms were equipped with lifts. The platforms at Kufstein are amongst the longest in Austria, at over 740 metres (2,430 ft).

Up until now, the station has never been a hub, although several projects are well advanced. Even so, it can be designated indirectly as a node, because Austrian domestic trains operate from Kufstein along the line to Rosenheim until just before Rosenheim, where they turn onto the Rosenheimer Schleife, and then continue on to Salzburg, without stopping in Germany.

== Train services ==
Almost all trains passing through Kufstein stop there, including multiple daily Intercity-Express (ICE) connections (to Vienna, Bregenz, Innsbruck, and Berlin).

Regional trains operate between Rosenheim und Innsbruck and other stops in the Upper Inn valley, and between Wörgl Hauptbahnhof and Kufstein, Kufstein, and Rosenheim, and between Kufstein and Munich. Line S1 of the Tyrol S-Bahn links Kufstein at hourly intervals with Landeck.

EuroCity and InterCity trains operate at least hourly to Innsbruck and then to further destinations alternating between Bregenz, Switzerland and Italy and also at least every second hour to Munich and Vienna.

There are also other further trains, such as an express train to Zell am See, and various special trains and CityNightLine connections to Belgium, Denmark, northern Germany and the Netherlands.

Train type	Route	Frequency
Intercity-Express	Vienna–Salzburg–Kufstein–Innsbruck–Feldkirch–Bregenz	Once daily
Intercity-Express	Berlin–München–Kufstein–Innsbruck	Once daily
EuroCity	Wien–Salzburg–Kufstein–Innsbruck–Feldkirch–Bregenz/Zürich/Basel	Every two hours
InterCity	München–Kufstein–Innsbruck–Verona–Milan/Rimini/Venice	Every two hours
RegionalExpress	Kufstein–Innsbruck	Multiple times daily
RegionalExpress	Kufstein–Rosenheim–München	Multiple times daily
S1 / RegionalBahn	Landeck-Innsbruck–Kufstein–Rosenheim	Hourly

== Interchange ==
The station is a terminus for many regional and city buses. Taxis are available at a large taxi stand in front of the station building.

== The future ==
In cooperation with the city of Kufstein and the Stadtwerke Kufstein, the ÖBB is planning a redesigned station forecourt (Südtirolerplatz) - a concept still in development.

The new Unterinntaltrasse (English:Lower Inn Valley route) is under construction between Kundl and Hall in Tirol. In a few years, other sections of the route will be constructed between Wörgl and Kufstein, and between Kufstein and Brannenburg. However, a construction start on these sections before 2020 is no longer a possibility. In all likelihood, the new route will not affect Kufstein station, but will pass further west of the city through open fields, and then lead into a 10 km (6.2 mi) long tunnel to Flintsbach/Brannenburg. The route selection process for Kundl to Langkampfen section is underway, but future plans depend heavily on the interests of Germany, as the tunnel will run under the border.

Meanwhile, the ÖBB has submitted to the city of Kufstein a project for land use changes on the site of the former customs clearance facilities. The ÖBB hopes to obtain permission to build a multi-storey office and commercial building on that site.

== See also ==
- History of rail transport in Austria
- Rail transport in Austria
