= Chiemsee-Bahn =

German narrow-gauge railway line

Chiemsee-Bahn Chiemsee railway
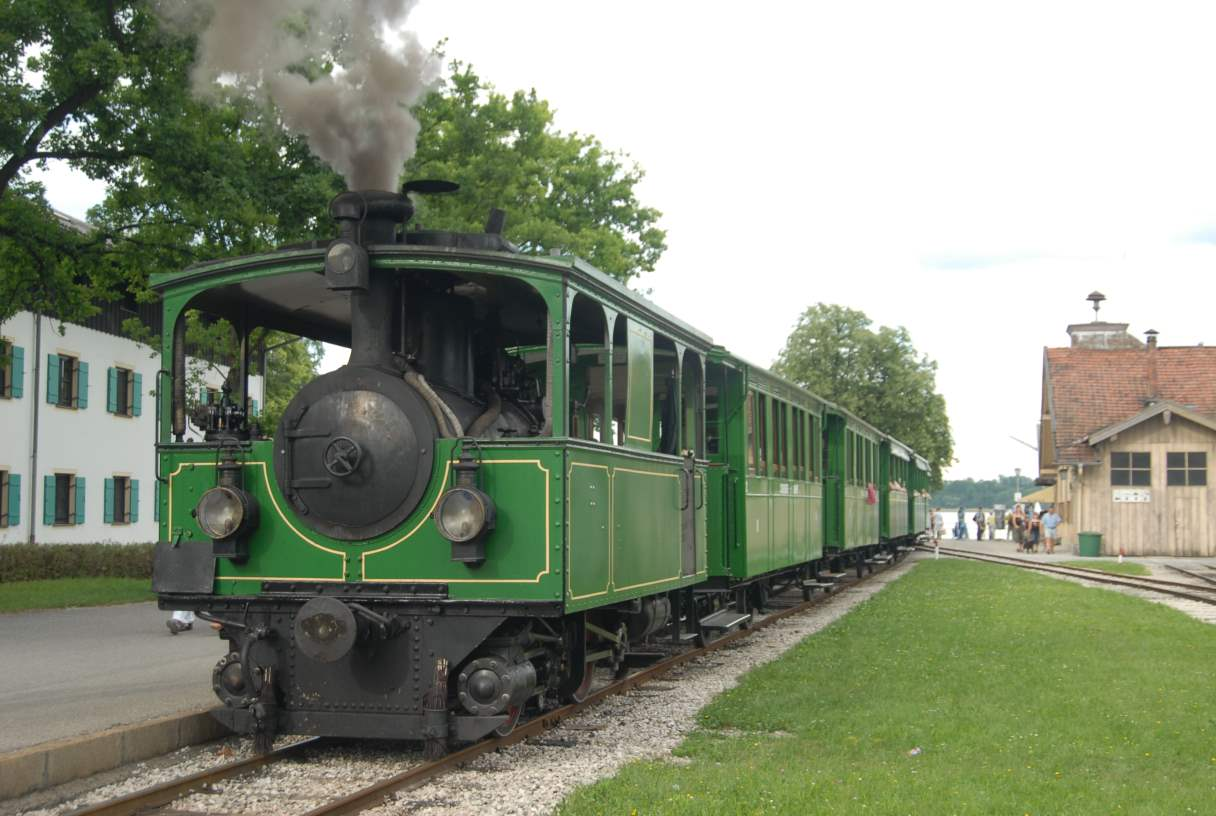
- A Chiemsee-Bahn train in May 2007

Overview
- Termini: Prien am Chiemsee station; Prien-Stock station

History
- Opened: July 9, 1887

Technical
- Line length: 1.9 km (1.2 mi)
- Track gauge: 1,000 mm (3 ft 3 3/8 in) metre gauge
Route map
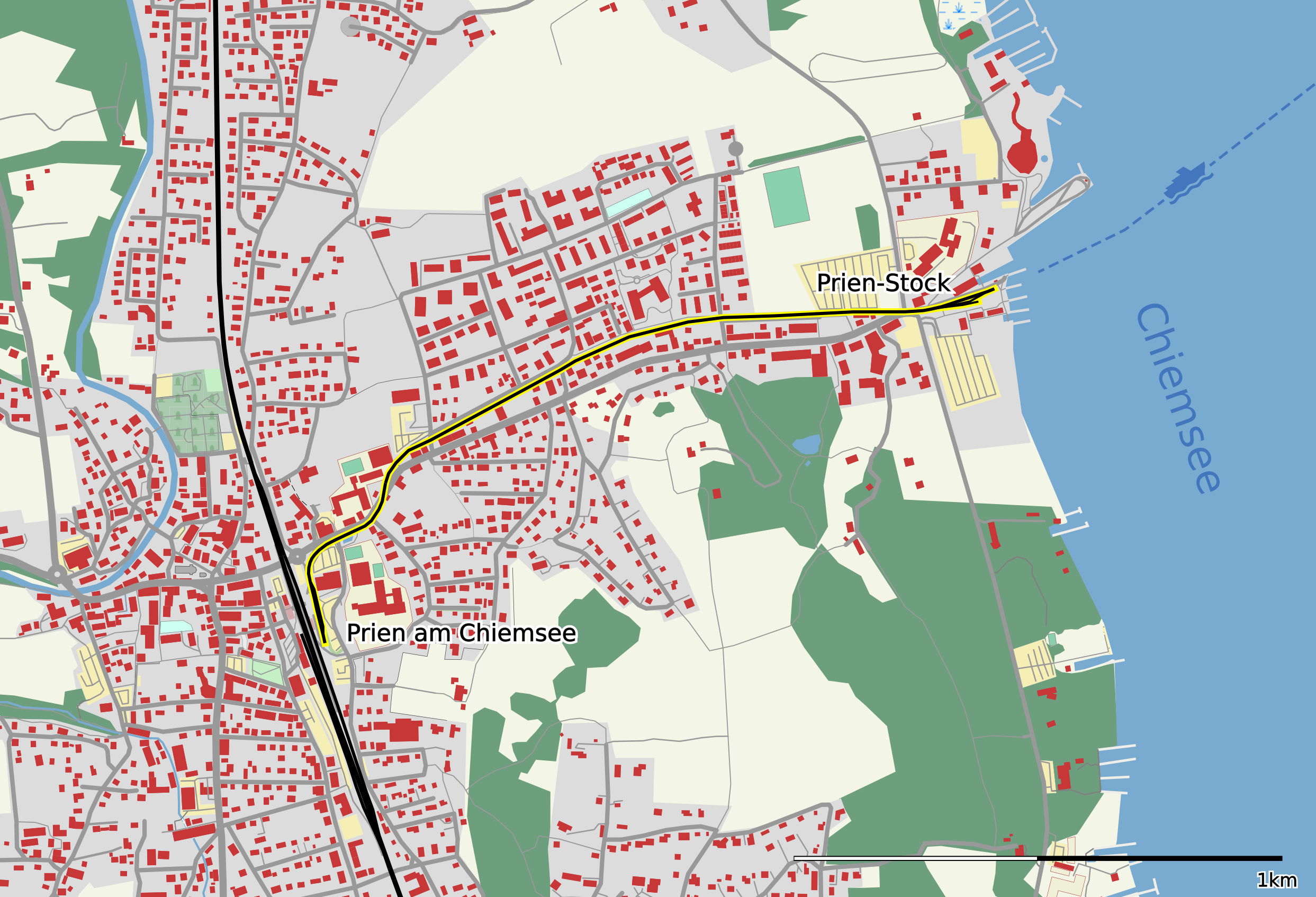

The Chiemsee-Bahn is a meter gauge railway line in Prien am Chiemsee, Germany. It is one of the world's last steam tramways, and the oldest continuously operated steam tramway in regular operation.

== Line ==
The 1.9 km (1 mi) long line connects Prien am Chiemsee with Prien-Stock station. Its original terminus was on the west side of the main line railway tracks at Prien am Chiemsee station, which required the Chiemsee-Bahn to cross the tracks. This situation was eliminated in the winter of 1908/1909, when the Chiemsee-Bahn moved its terminus to the east side of the station. The line, along with its steam locomotive and passenger cars, is registered as a historic monument of Bavaria, numbered D-1-87-162-66.

Termini

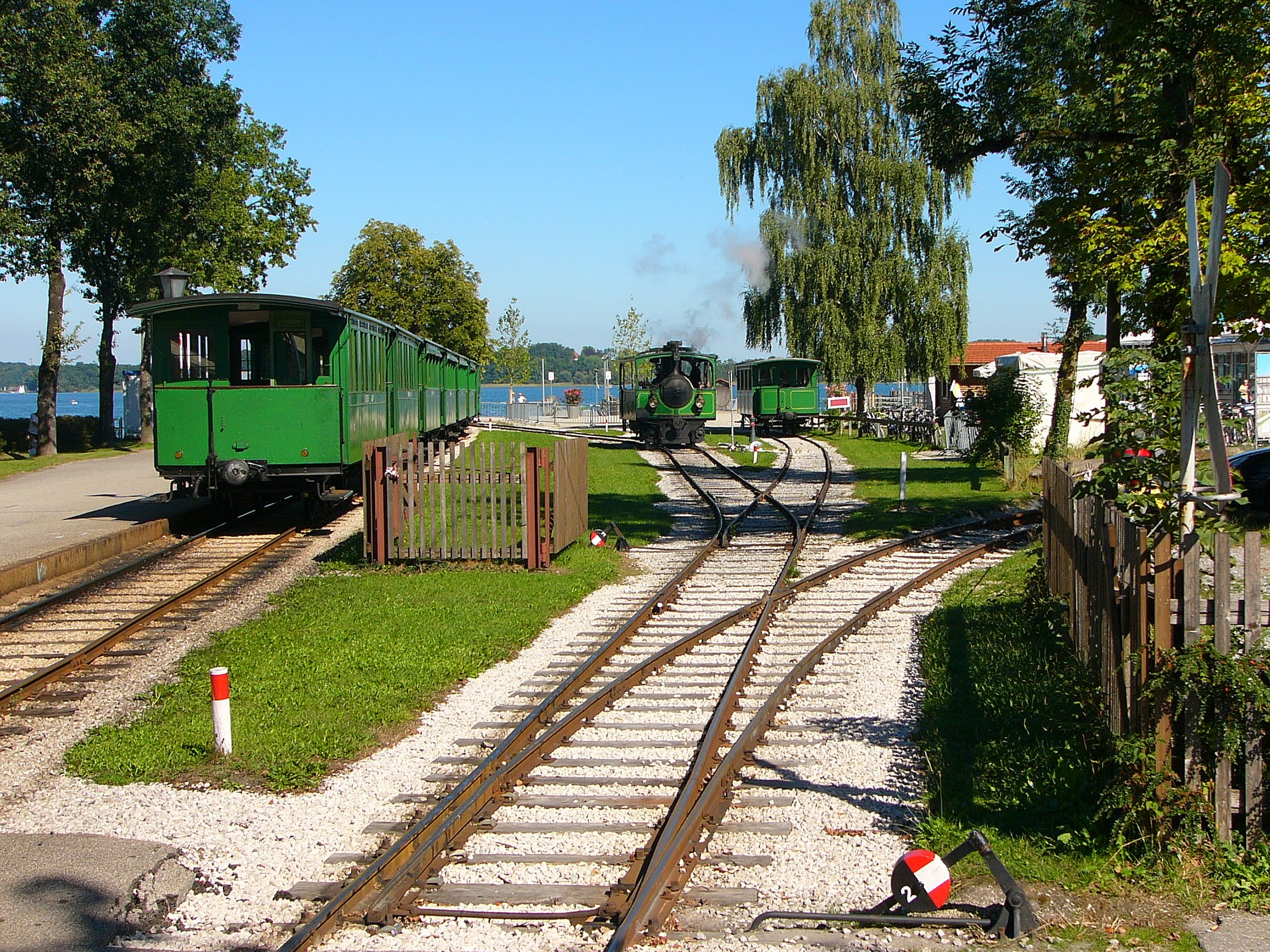
Prien-Stock station in September 2013

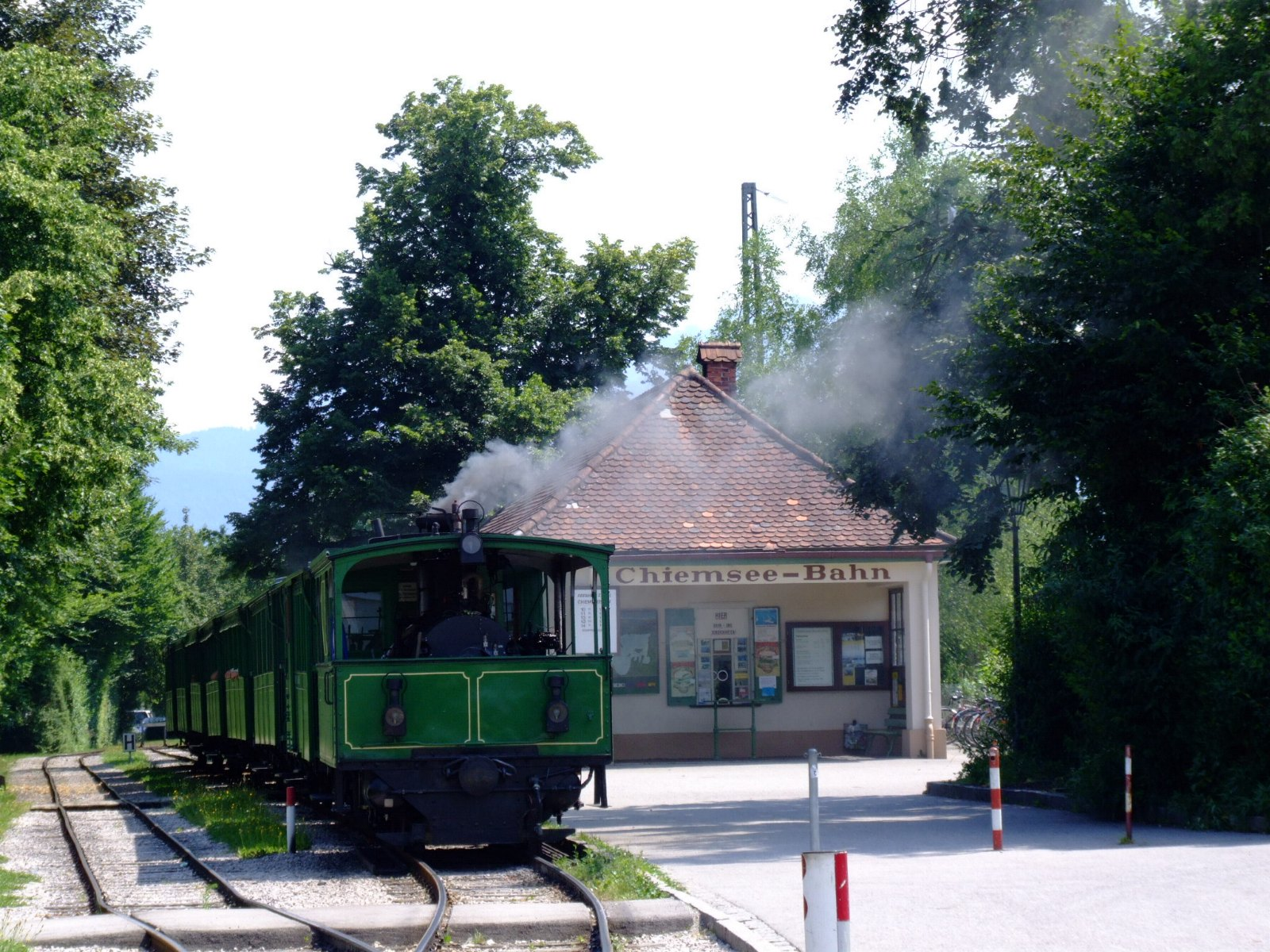
Prien am Chiemsee Chiemseebahnhof in July 2006

== History ==
After the death of King Ludwig II in 1886, his unfinished palace Herrenchiemsee was opened for visitors by his successor Luitpold, Prince Regent of Bavaria. Horse-drawn carriages transported the visitors from the railway station to the harbour, where they crossed over to the Herreninsel by boat. After an accident involving a horse-drawn carriage, Ludwig Feßler, operator of the Chiemsee-Schifffahrt, decided to contract Munich-based Krauss Locomotive Works with the planning for a local railway between Prien and Stock. The contract for the construction was signed on March 15, 1887. Construction began on May 2, and the line opened on July 9, 1887.

== Rolling stock ==
The rolling stock consists of one steam engine and nine passenger cars, which still are in their original condition from 1887. Since 1982, the Chiemsee-Bahn also has a Deutz diesel engine, which was built in 1962 and was bought from the Halbergerhütte in Saarland.

Rolling stock

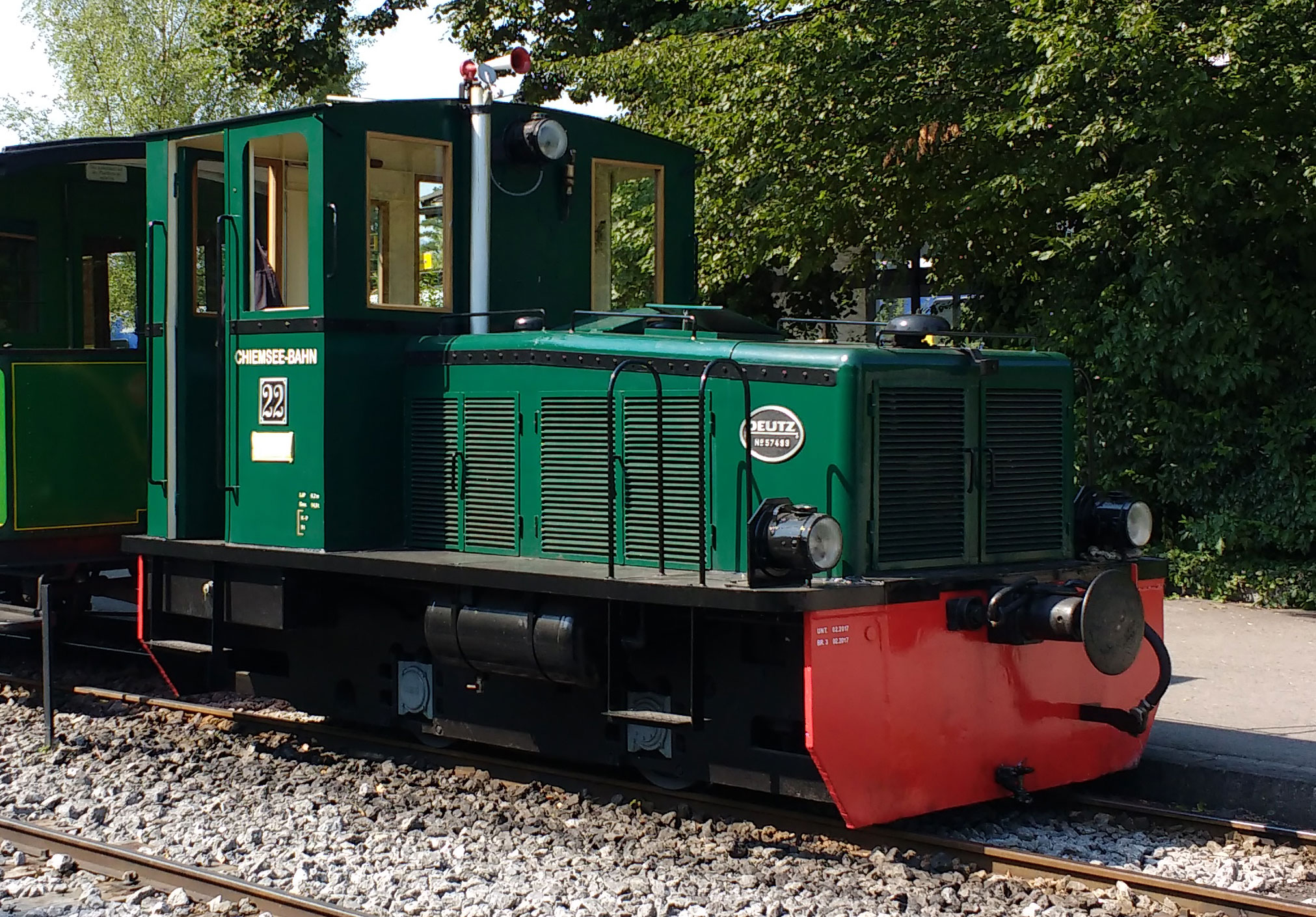
Chiemsee-Bahn diesel engine in June 2017

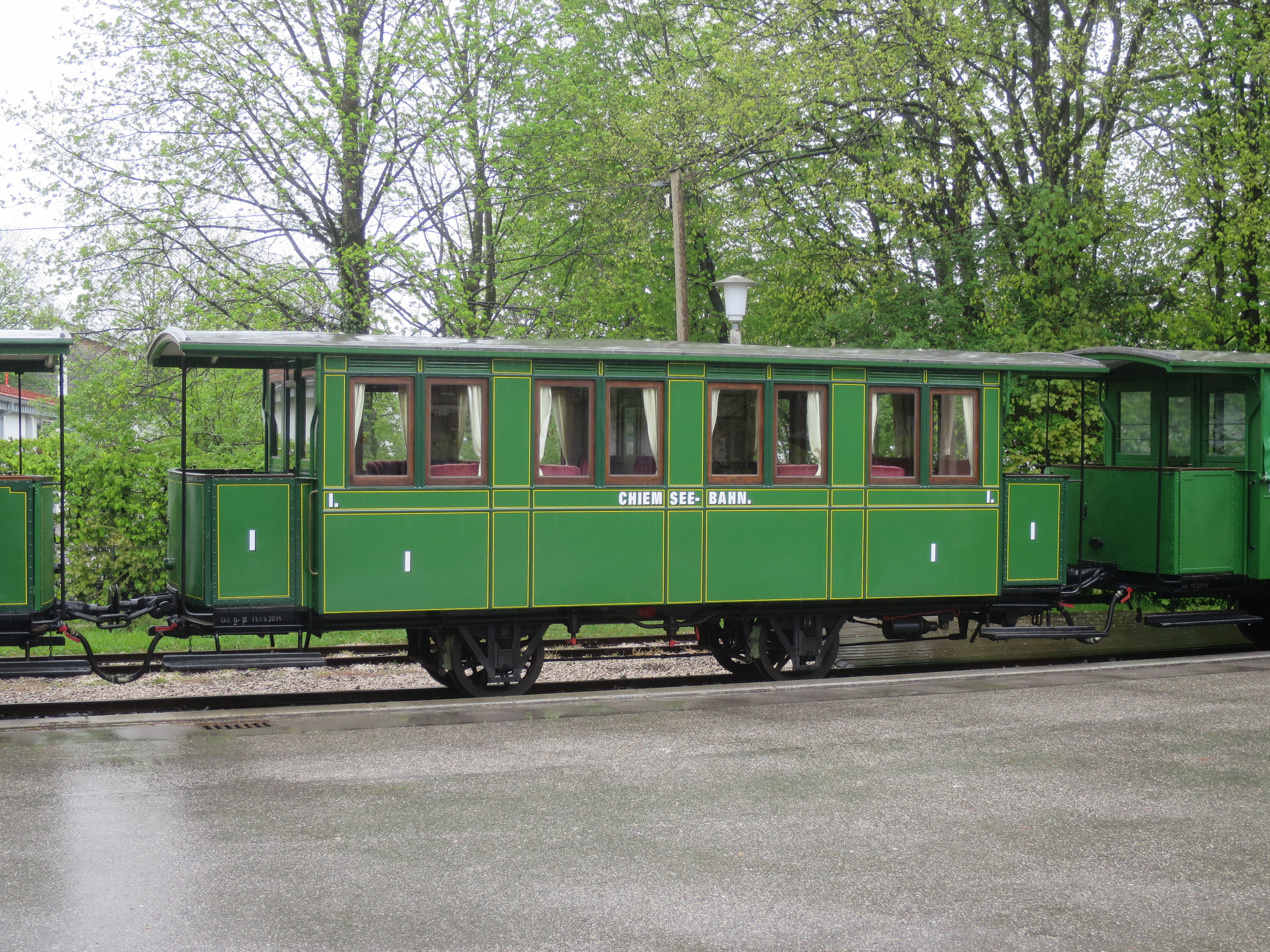
First class car in May 2015
