= Rosenheim station =

Railway station in Bavaria, Germany

Rosenheim
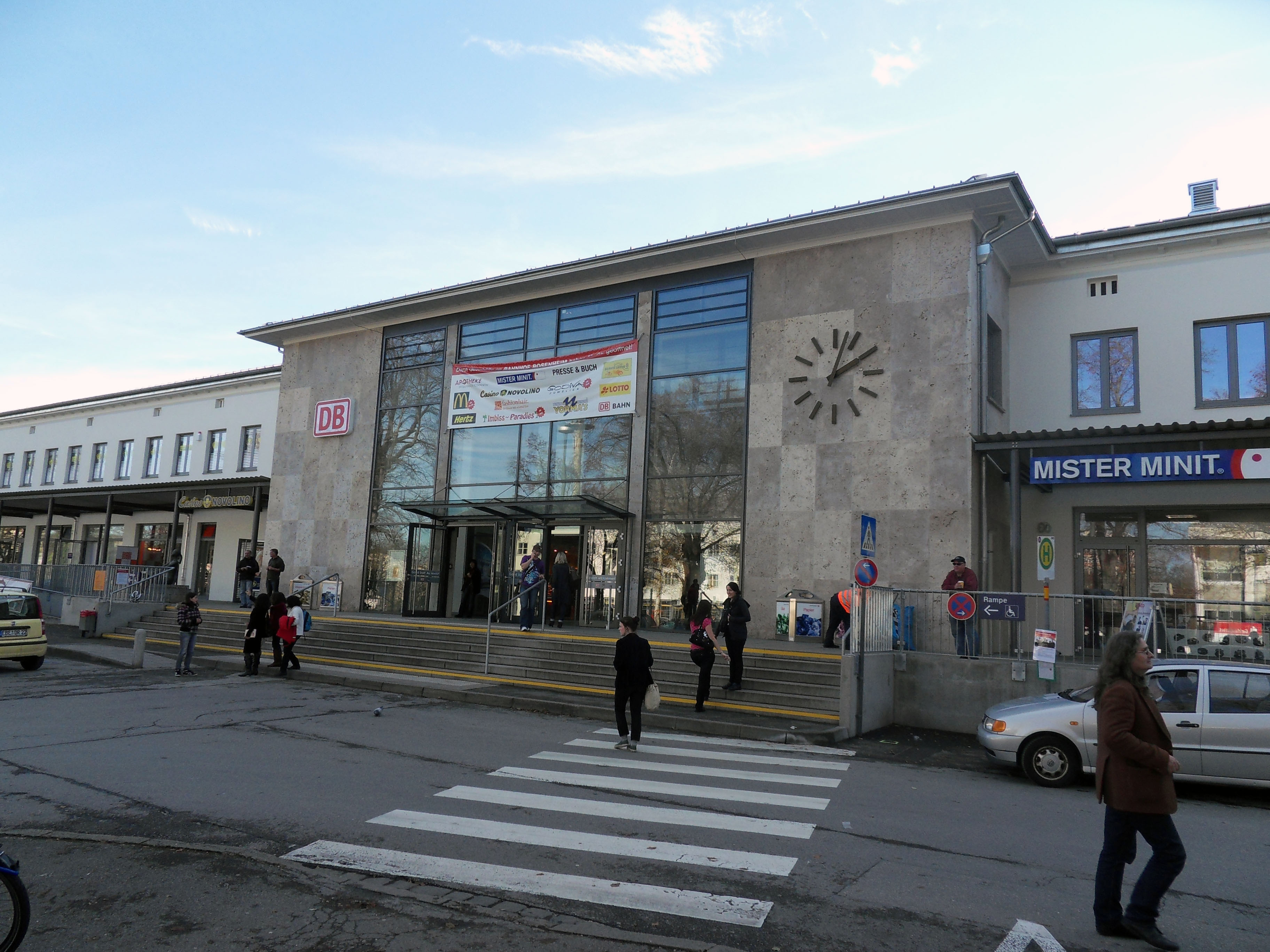
- Entrance building

General information
- Location: Südtiroler Platz; Rosenheim, Bavaria; Germany
- Coordinates: 47°51′01.3″N 12°07′10.3″E
- Owner: Deutsche Bahn
- Operator: DB Netz; DB Station&Service
- Lines: Rosenheim–Mühldorf (0.0 km); Rosenheim–Kufstein (0.0 km); Munich–Rosenheim (64.87 km); Rosenheim–Salzburg (0.0 km); Rosenheim–Holzkirchen (37.2 km)
- Platforms: 7 long-distance platforms; 1 bay platform

Construction
- Accessible: Yes

Other information
- Station code: MRO
- DS100 code: 5348
- IBNR: 8000320
- Category: 2
- Website: stationsdatenbank.de; www.bahnhof.de

History
- Opened: 19 April 1876; 150 years ago
- Electrified: 12 April 1927; 99 years ago

Passengers
- 20,000 per day
Services
Preceding station	DB Fernverkehr	Following station
München Ost towards Berlin Gesundbrunnen	ICE 11	Kufstein towards Innsbruck Hbf
München Ost towards Frankfurt (Main) Hbf or Münster Hbf	ICE 62	Prien am Chiemsee towards Graz Hbf
München Ost towards München Hbf	EC 62	Prien am Chiemsee towards Salzburg Hbf or Vienna Airport
München-Ost towards Stuttgart Hbf	IC 87	Traunstein towards Wien Hbf
München-Ost towards München Hbf	EC 89	Kufstein towards Venezia Santa Lucia
München-Ost towards München Hbf	ICE/RJX 90	Salzburg Hbf towards Budapest Keleti
München Ost towards Frankfurt (Main) Hbf	ICE 89	Kufstein towards Feldkirch
Preceding station	ÖBB	Following station
Munich East towards München Hbf	Railjet	Prien am Chiemsee towards Klagenfurt Hbf
Munich East towards München Hbf	Railjet	Bad Endorf towards Salzburg Hbf
Munich towards Amsterdam Centraal or Hamburg-Altona	Nightjet	Kufstein towards Innsbruck Hbf
Munich East towards München Hbf	Nightjet	Salzburg Hbf towards Roma Termini or La Spezia Centrale
Preceding station	EuroCity	Following station
München Ost towards München Hbf	EuroCity	Kufstein towards Bologna Centrale
München Ost towards München Hbf	EuroCity	Kufstein towards Rimini
München Ost towards München Hbf	EuroCity	Kufstein towards Verona Porta Nuova
München Ost towards Frankfurt (Main) Hbf	EuroCity	Prien am Chiemsee towards Klagenfurt Hbf
München Ost towards Frankfurt (Main) Hbf	EuroCity	Prien am Chiemsee towards Zagreb Glavni kolodvor
München Ost towards Saarbrücken Hbf	EuroCity	Prien am Chiemsee towards Graz Hbf
München Ost towards Frankfurt (Main) Hbf	EuroCity	Prien am Chiemsee towards Graz Hbf
München Ost towards München Hbf	EuroCity	Kufstein towards Innsbruck Hbf
Preceding station		Following station
München Ost towards München Hbf	RE 5	Bad Endorf towards Salzburg Hbf
Großkarolinenfeld towards München Hbf	RB 54	Raubling towards Kufstein
Rosenheim Aicherpark towards München Hbf	RB 58	Terminus
Preceding station		Following station
Rosenheim Hochschule towards Landshut (Bayern) Hbf	RB 44	Terminus
Terminus	RB 52	Bad Endorf towards Aschau (Chiemgau)
Preceding station	Croatian Railways	Following station
Munich East towards Stuttgart Hbf	EuroNight	Salzburg Hbf towards Zagreb
Preceding station	PKP Intercity	Following station
Munich East towards München Hbf	EuroNight	Salzburg Hbf towards Warszawa Wschodnia
Location

Rosenheim station (German: Bahnhof Rosenheim) is the main railway station in the city of Rosenheim in Bavaria, Germany. It is the seventh largest passenger station in Bavaria and an important railway hub between the Munich–Rosenheim railway line and the lines to Salzburg, Kufstein/Innsbruck and Mühldorf, as well as the Mangfall Valley Railway. Rosenheim is operated by DB Station&Service, a subsidiary of Deutsche Bahn AG, and is classified as a Category 2 station

== History ==
A first station on the Rosenheim–Kufstein–Innsbruck line, promoted by industrialist Joseph Maffei and King Maximilian II of Bavaria, was opened on 31 October 1857. Located south of the city centre, it soon proved to be too small after the opening of the line to Salzburg in 1860 and the Austrian Brenner Railway in 1867. From 1873 onwards, a new station at the present site was built; it was inaugurated on 19 April 1876. After only 18 years of usage, the old station building was sold to the City of Rosenheim and serves as its town hall (Rathaus) up to today.

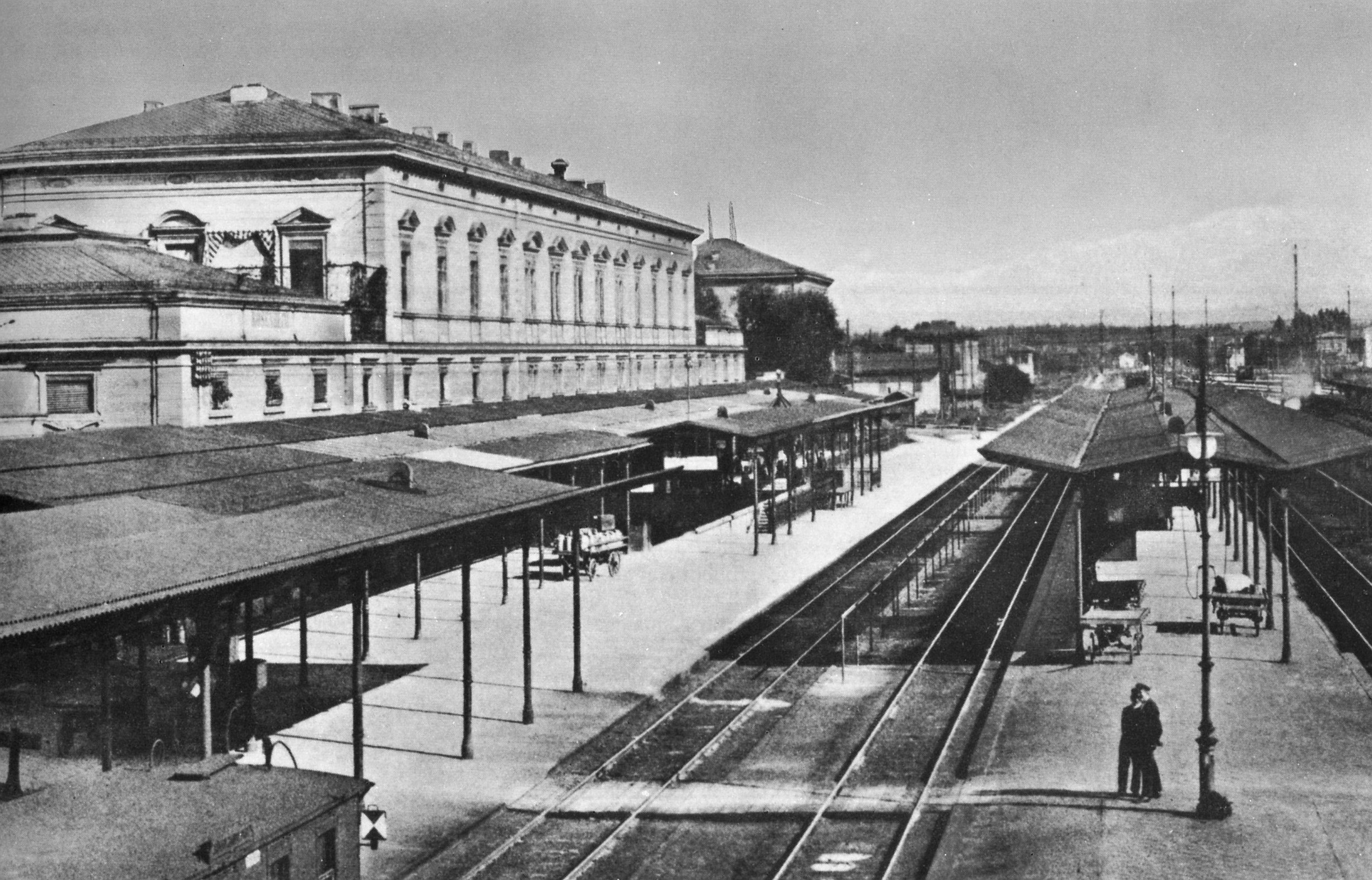
Railway tracks about 1905

The new station, a Neo-Renaissance building, was large enough to cope with the additional traffic on the newly opened line to Mühldorf from 1 May 1876. It was nevertheless rebuilt and enlarged several times during the following decades, including an extended freight yards and a locomotive depot (Bahnbetriebswerk). The premises were severely damaged by strategic bombing in World War II, operations ceased on 20 April 1945.

After the war, the railway connections were restored and a provisional entrance hall was rebuilt by 1950. The present station building was inaugurated on 27 July 1957. From 1967 onwards, corridor trains on the Deutsches Eck railway link, operated by the Austrian Federal Railways (ÖBB), passed through Rosenheim and had to turn back here (while leaving the wagons was prohibited), until from 1982 the so-called "Rosenheim curve" (Rosenheimer Kurve) allowed bypassing the station.

== Operational usage ==
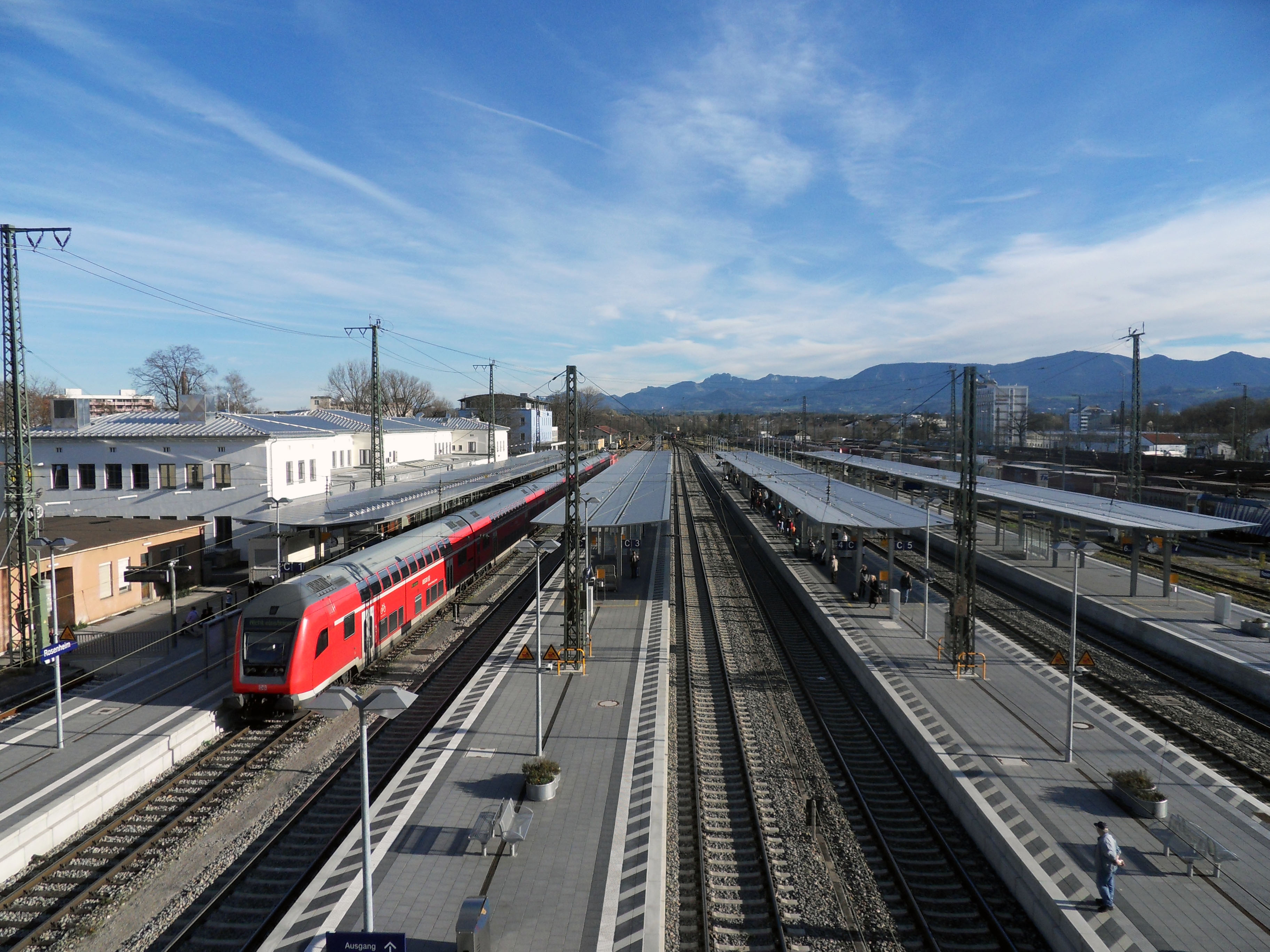
Railway tracks in 2010

Rosenheim station is a major railway hub for Regional-Express and Regionalbahn trains in Upper Bavaria, operated by the SüdostBayernBahn network of Deutsche Bahn AG as well as by the private Bayerische Oberlandbahn railway company. Every hour trains arrive from Salzburg, Munich, Innsbruck, Kreuzstraße/Holzkirchen and Mühldorf am Inn roughly at the same time and depart a few minutes later.

In addition Eurocity trains from Dortmund and Munich to Verona and Klagenfurt as well as Intercity trains from Hamburg and Frankfurt am Main to Salzburg arrive every two hours and there are occasional night trains to Italy and Austria/Serbia/Hungary. Since 2011, the new ÖBB Railjet high speed train running between Munich and Vienna/Budapest stops at Rosenheim once per day. ÖBB corridor trains from Salzburg to Kufstein and back still pass to the south of the station on the Rosenheim curve.

Many regional and city buses of the local passenger transport executive (RoVG) depart from the station and taxis may be taken from a large taxi stand in front of the station building.

== Train services ==
In the 2026 timetable, the following services stopped at the station:

Line	Route		Frequency	Operator
ICE 11	Berlin Gesundbrunnen – Berlin – Leipzig – Erfurt – Frankfurt – Mannheim – Stuttgart – Munich – Rosenheim – Innsbruck		1 train pair	DB Fernverkehr
ICE 62	Frankfurt – Darmstadt – Heidelberg –	Stuttgart – Ulm – Augsburg – Munich – Rosenheim – Salzburg – Villach – Klagenfurt – Graz	2 train pairs	DB Fernverkehr
ICE 62	Münster – Essen – Düsseldorf – Köln Messe/Deutz – Frankfurt Airport – Mannheim –	Stuttgart – Ulm – Augsburg – Munich – Rosenheim – Salzburg – Villach – Klagenfurt – Graz	One train pair	DB Fernverkehr
EC/RJ 62	Munich – Rosenheim – Prien – Traunstein – Salzburg (– Villach – Klagenfurt – Graz – Vienna – Vienna Airport)		2 train pairs to Salzburg, 1 train pair to Vienna Airport	ÖBB
IC 87	Stuttgart – München – Rosenheim – Salzburg – Linz – St. Pölten – Wien		1 train pair	DB Fernverkehr
EC 89	Munich – Munich East – Rosenheim – Kufstein – Wörgl – Jenbach – Innsbruck – Brenner – Franzensfeste – Brixen – Bolzano – Trento – Rovereto – Verona – Bologna		Every 2 hours	DB Fernverkehr
ICE/RJX 90	Munich – Rosenheim – Salzburg – Vienna (– Budapest Keleti)		ÖBB, DB Fernverkehr	1 train pair
RE 5	Munich (– Grafing) – Rosenheim – Traunstein – Freilassing – Salzburg		Hourly	Bayerische Regiobahn
RB 44	Rosenheim - Mühldorf (Oberbayern)		Hourly	Südostbayernbahn
RB 52	Rosenheim – Prien am Chiemsee – Aschau		One train pair	Südostbayernbahn
RB 54	München Hauptbahnhof – Grafing – Rosenheim – Kufstein		Hourly	Bayerische Regiobahn
RB 58	München Hauptbahnhof – Holzkirchen – Rosenheim		Hourly	Bayerische Regiobahn

== See also ==
- List of scheduled railway routes in Germany
