= Aschau (Chiemgau) station =

Railway station in Germany

Aschau (Chiemgau)
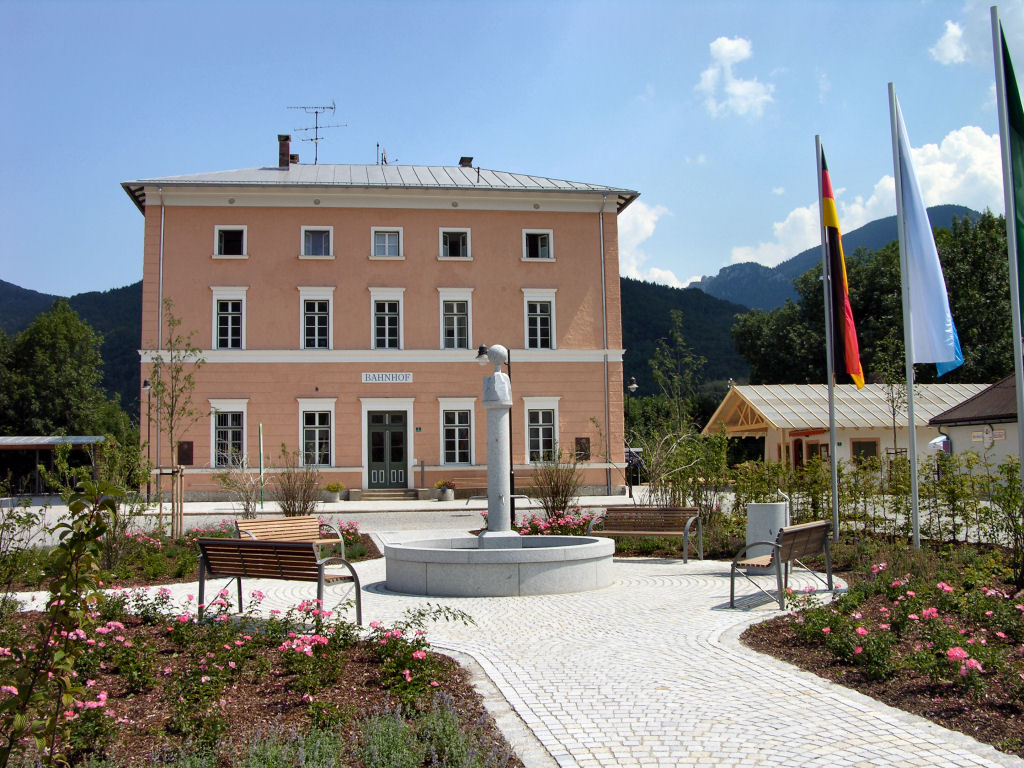

General information
- Location: Bahnhofplatz 4; 83229 Aschau im Chiemgau; Bavaria; Germany
- Coordinates: 47°46′45″N 12°19′31″E
- Owner: DB Netz
- Operator: DB Station&Service
- Line: Chiemgau Railway
- Platforms: 1 side platform
- Tracks: 1
- Train operators: Südostbayernbahn

Other information
- Station code: 190
- DS100 code: MASC
- IBNR: 8000621
- Category: 6
- Website: www.bahnhof.de

Services
Preceding station		Following station
Umrathshausen Ort towards Prien am Chiemsee	RB 52	Terminus
Location
- Location within Bavaria Location within Germany Location within Europe

Aschau (Chiemgau) station is a railway station in the municipality of Aschau im Chiemgau, located in the Rosenheim district in Bavaria, Germany.

The main building at Hans-Clarin-Platz was built in 1884 and was declared as a state cultural heritage monument (file# D-1-87-114-1).
