= Salzburg Hauptbahnhof =

Railway station in Salzburg, Austria

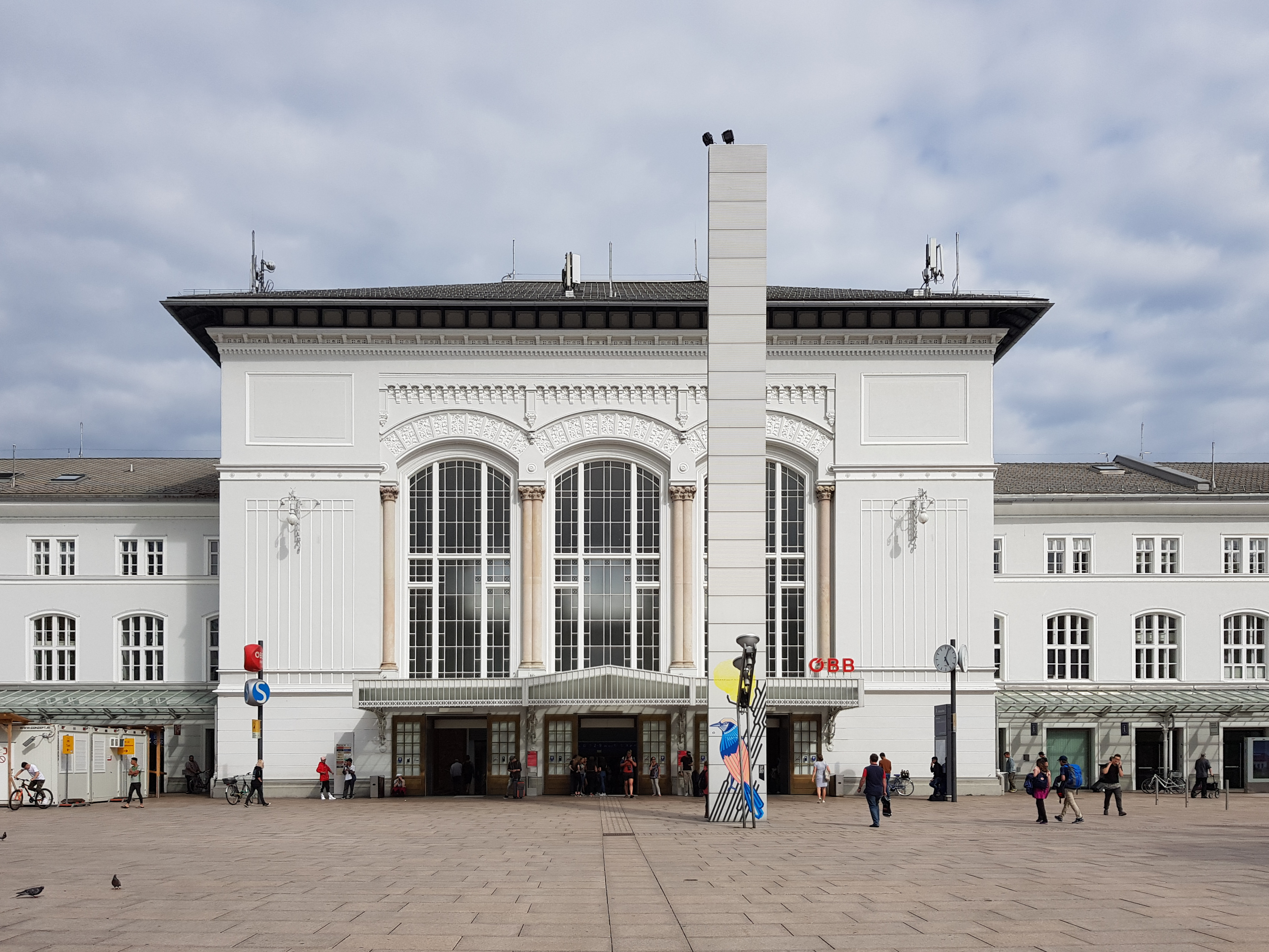
- Station building

General information
- Location: Südtiroler Platz 1; 5020 Salzburg; Austria
- Coordinates: 47°48′47″N 13°2′48″E
- Elevation: 428 m (1,404 ft)
- Owner: ÖBB
- Operator: ÖBB Infra
- Lines: Western Railway; Rosenheim–Salzburg; Salzburg-Tyrol Railway; Salzburger Lokalbahn
- Platforms: 9 through 2 terminating (local line)
- Train operators: ÖBB; Bayerische Regiobahn; Südostbayernbahn
- Connections: Bus: Salzburg trolleybuses and city buses

Construction
- Architect: Kada Wittfeld

Other information
- Station code: ZSB

History
- Opened: 1860
- Rebuilt: 2012-2014
Services
Preceding station	ÖBB	Following station
Kufstein towards Zürich HB	Railjet Express	Linz Hbf towards Bratislava hl.st.
Kufstein towards Zürich HB	Railjet Express	Linz Hbf towards Vienna Airport
Kufstein towards Zürich HB	Railjet Express	Linz Hbf towards Budapest Keleti
Kufstein towards Innsbruck Hbf	Railjet Express	Linz Hbf towards Vienna Airport
München Hbf Terminus	Railjet Express	Linz Hbf towards Wien Hbf
Rosenheim towards München Hbf	Railjet Express	Linz Hbf towards Budapest Keleti
Kufstein towards Bregenz	Railjet Express	Linz Hbf towards Vienna Airport
Freilassing towards München Hbf	Railjet	Golling-Abtenau towards Klagenfurt Hbf
Freilassing towards München Hbf	Railjet	Terminus
Terminus	Railjet	Neumarkt am Wallersee towards Wien Hbf
Freilassing towards Frankfurt (Main) Hbf	EuroCity	Salzburg Süd towards Graz Hbf
Freilassing towards Frankfurt (Main) Hbf	EuroCity	Golling-Abtenau towards Klagenfurt Hbf
Freilassing towards Frankfurt (Main) Hbf	EuroCity	Golling-Abtenau towards Zagreb Glavni kolodvor
Innsbruck Hbf towards Zürich HB or Stuttgart Hbf	EuroNight	Wels Hbf towards Budapest Keleti
Rosenheim towards Stuttgart Hbf	Nightjet	Bischofshofen towards Venezia Santa Lucia
Rosenheim towards München Hbf	Nightjet	Schwarzach-St.Veit towards Roma Termini or La Spezia Centrale
Innsbruck Hbf towards Bregenz	Nightjet	Vöcklabruck towards Wien Hbf
Terminus	REX 3	Salzburg Süd towards Wörgl Hbf
Salzburg Mülln-Altstadt towards Salzburg Taxham Europark	REX 21	Seekirchen am Wallersee towards Braunau am Inn
Preceding station		Following station
Freilassing towards München Hbf	RE 5	Terminus
Preceding station		Following station
Salzburg Mülln-Altstadt towards Landshut (Bayern) Hbf	RB 45	Terminus
Preceding station	Salzburg S-Bahn	Following station
Terminus	S1	Salzburg Itzling towards Lamprechtshausen
Salzburg Mülln-Altstadt towards Freilassing	S2	Salzburg Kasern towards Straßwalchen
Salzburg Mülln-Altstadt towards Bad Reichenhall	S3	Salzburg Sam towards Saalfelden
Preceding station	Croatian Railways	Following station
Rosenheim towards Stuttgart Hbf	EuroNight	Schwarzach-St.Veit towards Zagreb
Preceding station	PKP Intercity	Following station
Rosenheim towards Munich	EuroNight	Attnang-Puchheim towards Warszawa Wschodnia
Location
- Location within Austria Location within Europe

Salzburg Hauptbahnhof (German for Salzburg main station; abbreviated Salzburg Hbf and occasionally translated as Central Station) is the main railway station in Salzburg, capital of the federal state of Salzburg in Austria. It is the most important station in the agglomeration of Salzburg, and a major transportation hub in western Austria.

== Overview ==
For a long time, Salzburg Hauptbahnhof has been a border station at the Austrian border with Germany. It is served by ÖBB and Deutsche Bahn. It also forms a junction between several ÖBB local and long-distance transport routes.

At Salzburg Hbf, the Western Railway from Vienna and Linz links with the Rosenheim–Salzburg railway, on which, along with international trains, so-called ÖBB corridor services make express connections with the Tyrol and the Vorarlberg, via the German Corner at Rosenheim. Another main line, the Salzburg-Tyrol railway, heads from Salzburg Hbf in a southerly direction via Bischofshofen and Zell am See to Wörgl Hauptbahnhof. In Schwarzach-St. Veit, yet another main line, the Tauern Railway, branches off from this line.

Salzburg Hauptbahnhof is also important as a departure point for regional services on the Salzburger Lokalbahn, and as a key hub of the Salzburg S-Bahn and for many regional buses serving Greater Salzburg. Also located at the station is one of the key hubs in the StadtBus Salzburg trolleybus system and city bus network.

Until 1957, a local railway station in the Salzburg Hbf forecourt was the departure point for the narrow gauge Salzkammergut-Lokalbahn, commonly known as the Ischlerbahn, to Mondsee and Bad Ischl.

== History ==
In 1860, the Duchy of Salzburg was connected by its Hauptbahnhof with Europe's international railway network by the Bavarian Maximilian's Railway from Munich via Rosenheim, and with the Austria-Hungary's domestic network by the Empress Elisabeth Railway (the present day Western Railway) to Vienna. Taking into account the Hauptbahnhof's location, it was originally laid out as a through station.

After 1900, part of the station was rebuilt as an island station. Parallel to the station building, which faces a through track, an additional building was erected, on a wide platform topped with a train shed. On the other side of the train shed are further through tracks. Inside it are terminating tracks, for Austrian domestic traffic on the northeastern side and for trains to Germany on the southwestern side.

Following the construction of further rail links, culminating in the Tauern Railway to Villach and on to Trieste in 1909, the station increased in importance as a transport hub. From the now defunct local station complex on the station forecourt, trains began operating in 1886 on the Salzburger Lokalbahn and in 1893 on the Salzkammergut-Lokalbahn.

In 1944 and 1945, the final years of World War II, the station and its network of tracks was the target of numerous bombing raids by American naval aircraft. These raids partially destroyed the station as a whole. Some unexploded ordnance from the raids is believed to be still embedded in the station yard to this day. The risk that it might explode without warning has often created difficulties when deep excavations need to be performed. In 2003, an unsuccessful defusing of a 250-pound (110 kg) bomb even cost two explosives experts their lives, and in July/August 2007, the ÖBB carried out a search for further unexploded ordnance.

Since 1996, the Salzburger Lokalbahn has had its terminus in an underground station under the Südtiroler Platz. An underground extension of this railway as a U-Bahn or Stadtbahn line into or through the city centre was planned, and remains an option. With the establishment and expansion of the S-Bahn system in the Salzburg agglomeration, the Hauptbahnhof's importance has again increased, as it repeatedly hits its capacity limits, due to the limited number of through tracks.

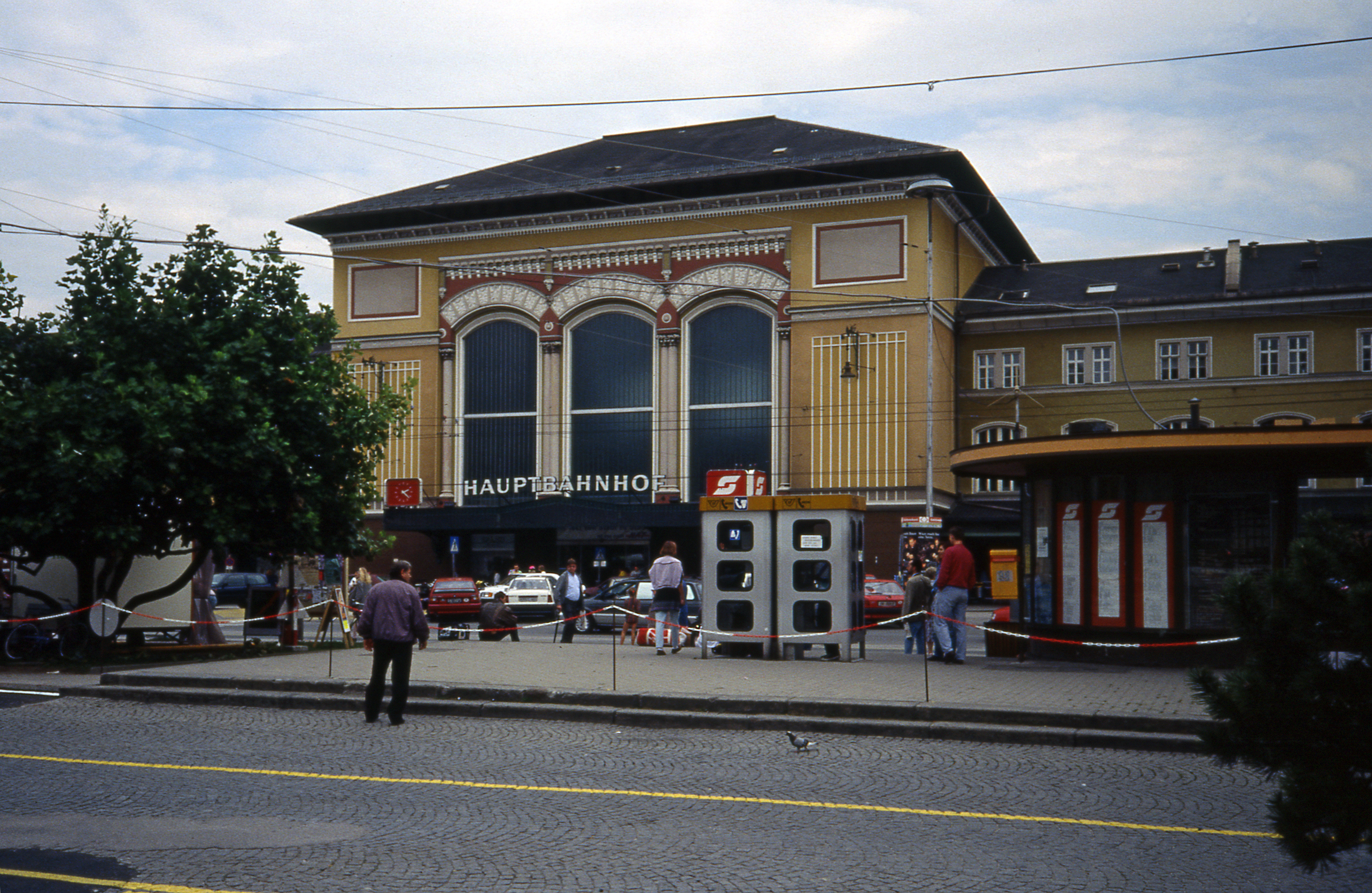
Salzburg Hauptbahnhof and forecourt, 1992.

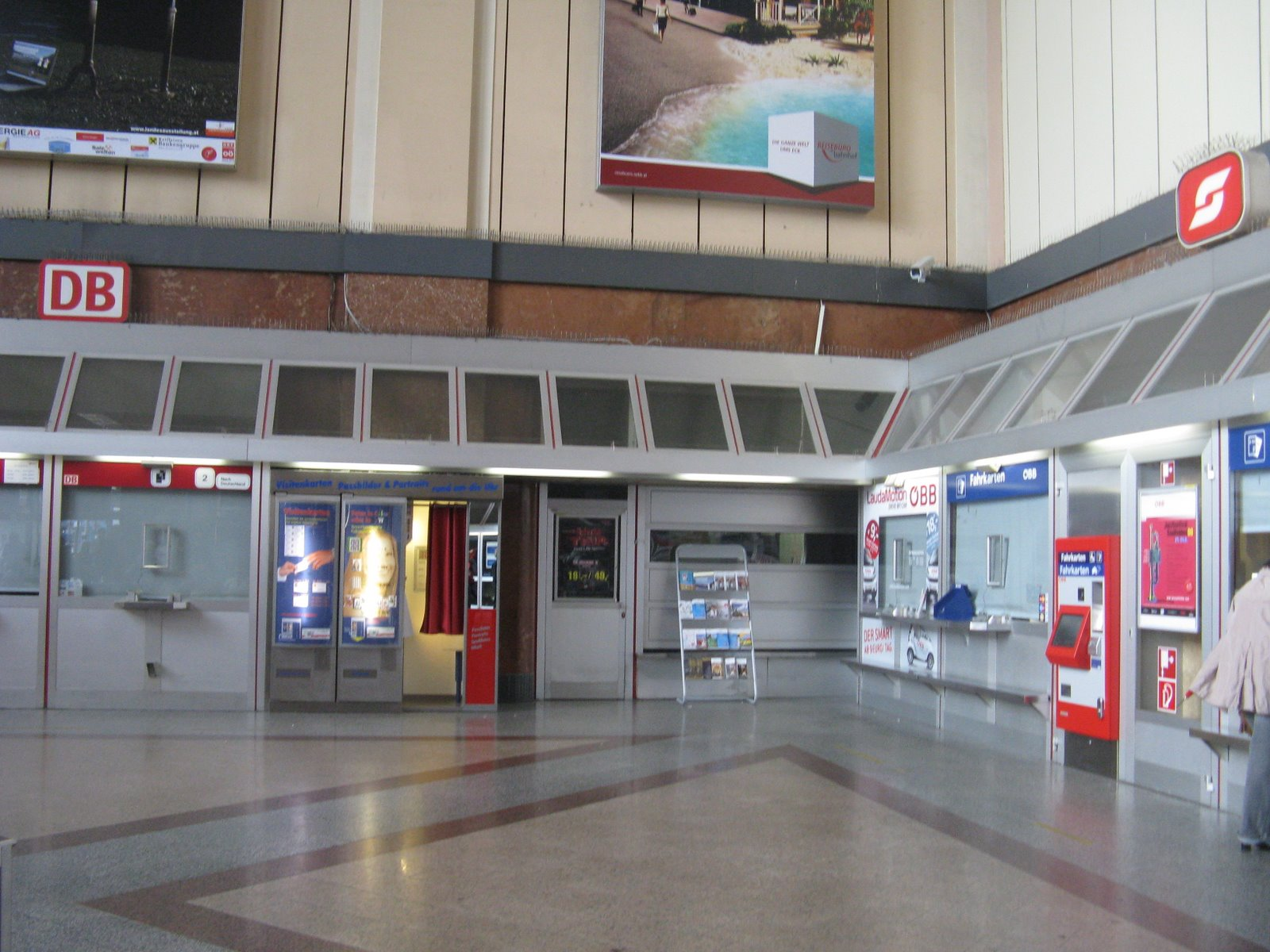
As Salzburg Hbf is a border station, there are both DB and ÖBB ticket windows.

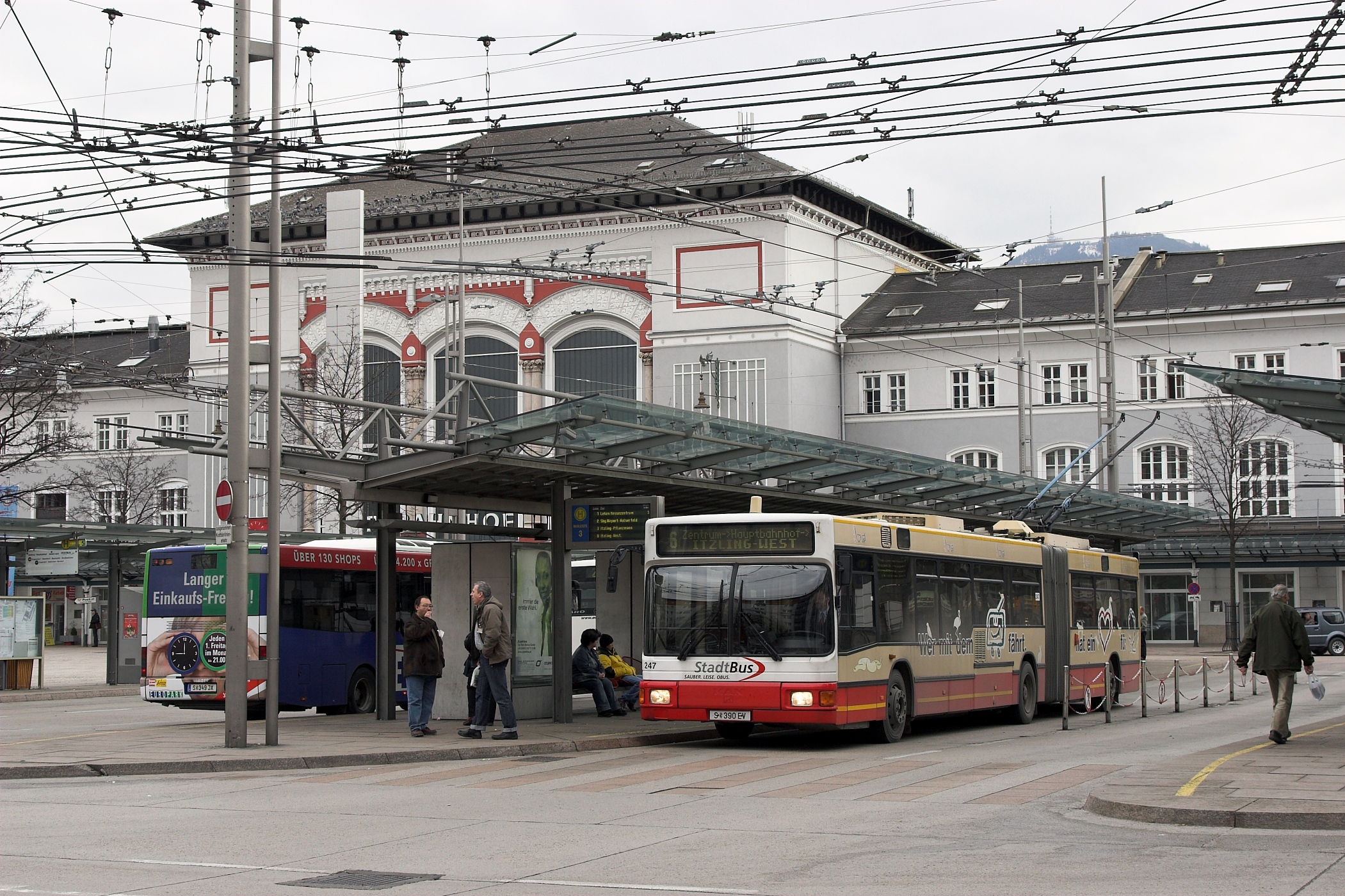
Trolleybus terminus in front of the Hauptbahnhof, 2008.

Platforms and tracks to 2009.

== Renovations ==
The structure of the station as it existed at the start of the twenty-first century, with its bay platforms and five through platforms, was regarded as being more of a hindrance than a help to train services within the Schengen Agreement area's open borders. Under the so-called ÖBB-Bahnhofsoffensive, a complete rebuild of the railway tracks and platforms was therefore made. The bay platforms were replaced with through platforms, and the three dingy platform access underpasses by a large shopping mall. The shopping mall extended under all of the railway lines, from Südtirolerplatz to the north right through to the station's rear or southern side.

The competition for the design of the renovations was won by Klaus Kada, who had already designed the new Klagenfurt Hauptbahnhof. His winning entry was presented as early as May 1999. However, the actual construction project, which was essential to the station's future as a node for both long distance and local transport services, was consistently delayed.

The delays were due in part to controversy over the marble hall, which was located in a building on the wide island platform. That building needed to be demolished in the course of the renovations. The marble hall, a part of the station restaurant, had been built after World War II. A community group felt that it was of historic value, and should therefore be retained. The city of Salzburg proposed a compromise, involving the removal of the hall and its reconstruction elsewhere in a new building. Eventually, the competent authority ended the dispute, by approving the marble hall's demolition, under the city's proposed conditions. The marble from the marble hall was taken away from the demolition site under the supervision of the Heritage Office, and is currently being stored by the ÖBB.

Meanwhile, as a consequence of the removal of panels in the station lobby, well-preserved tile images have come to light.

The steel roof structure of the canopy on the island platform has been placed under cultural heritage management. The structure was therefore carefully removed at the start of November 2009, and taken to Linz to be restored prior to integration into the new station. In February 2011 the first of the seven arches of the roof structure was re-erected.

The total budget for the station construction was 270 million Euros, of which just over 10% was contributed by the province of Salzburg. The works commenced on 7 November 2008. Currently, the renovations are almost complete (according to the ÖBB project manager the works are exactly on schedule). The upgrade was scheduled to be completed in 2014.

To carry out the renovations while normal train services are operating, the planners had to make special arrangements:

- Since 2009, the ÖBB services at the station have been temporarily relocated to shipping containers on the station forecourt. Until the completion of the building work, the ticket hall, automatic ticket machines, travel centre, station restaurant, and book, periodical and tobacco shops are situated there, along with an Infobox including an exhibition about the renovations.
- The reduced number of available tracks is a logistical challenge for the maintenance of a service to schedule. In some cases, the renovations have therefore led to delays in rail traffic.
- Since 27 October 2009, the station forecourt has been available to private traffic only on a restricted basis; public transport has not been affected.
- Access paths to the platforms have been redefined since 2010; the old ticket hall is closed, and temporary access to the platforms is via the left and right of the station building
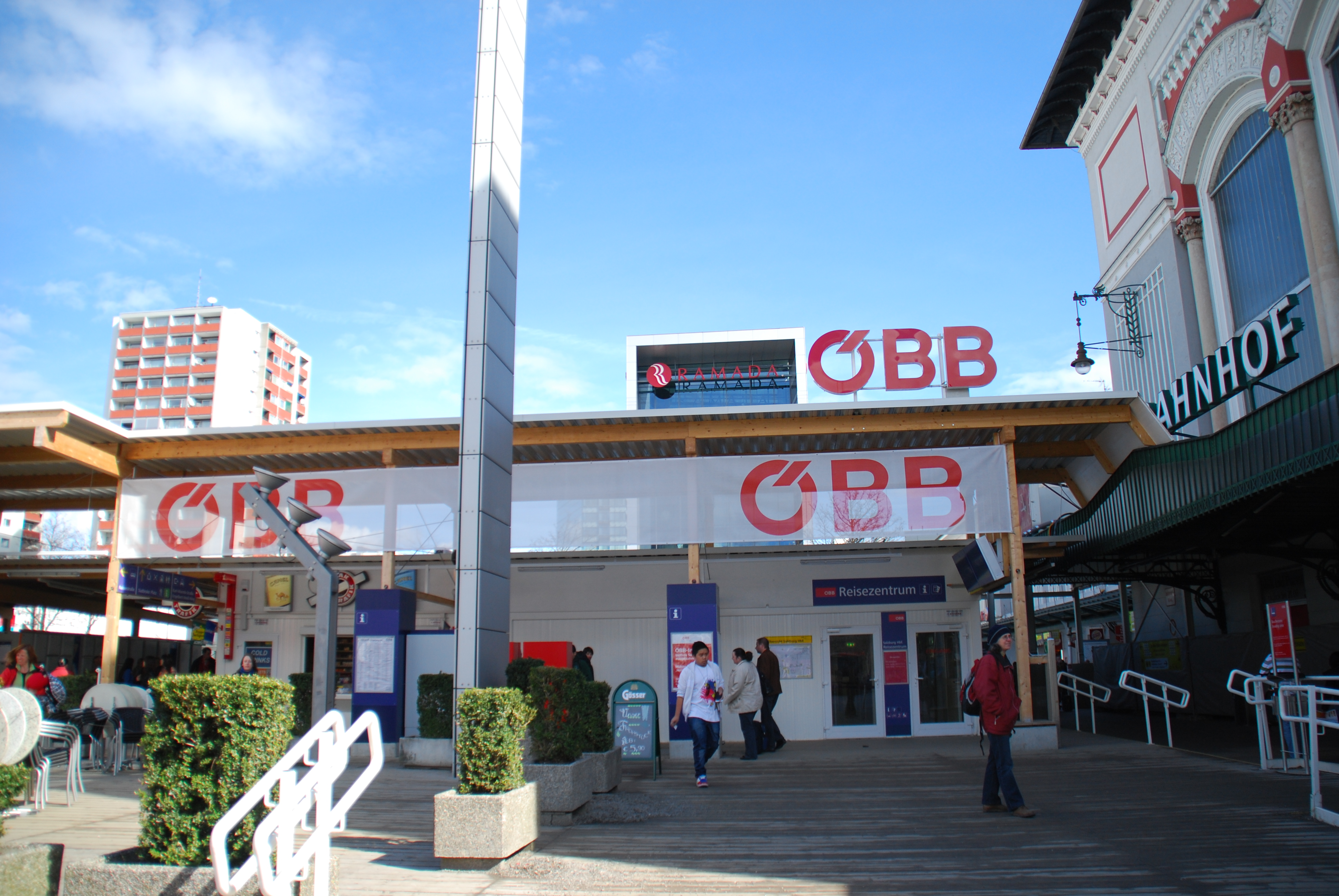
Provisional ticket counter and machines.

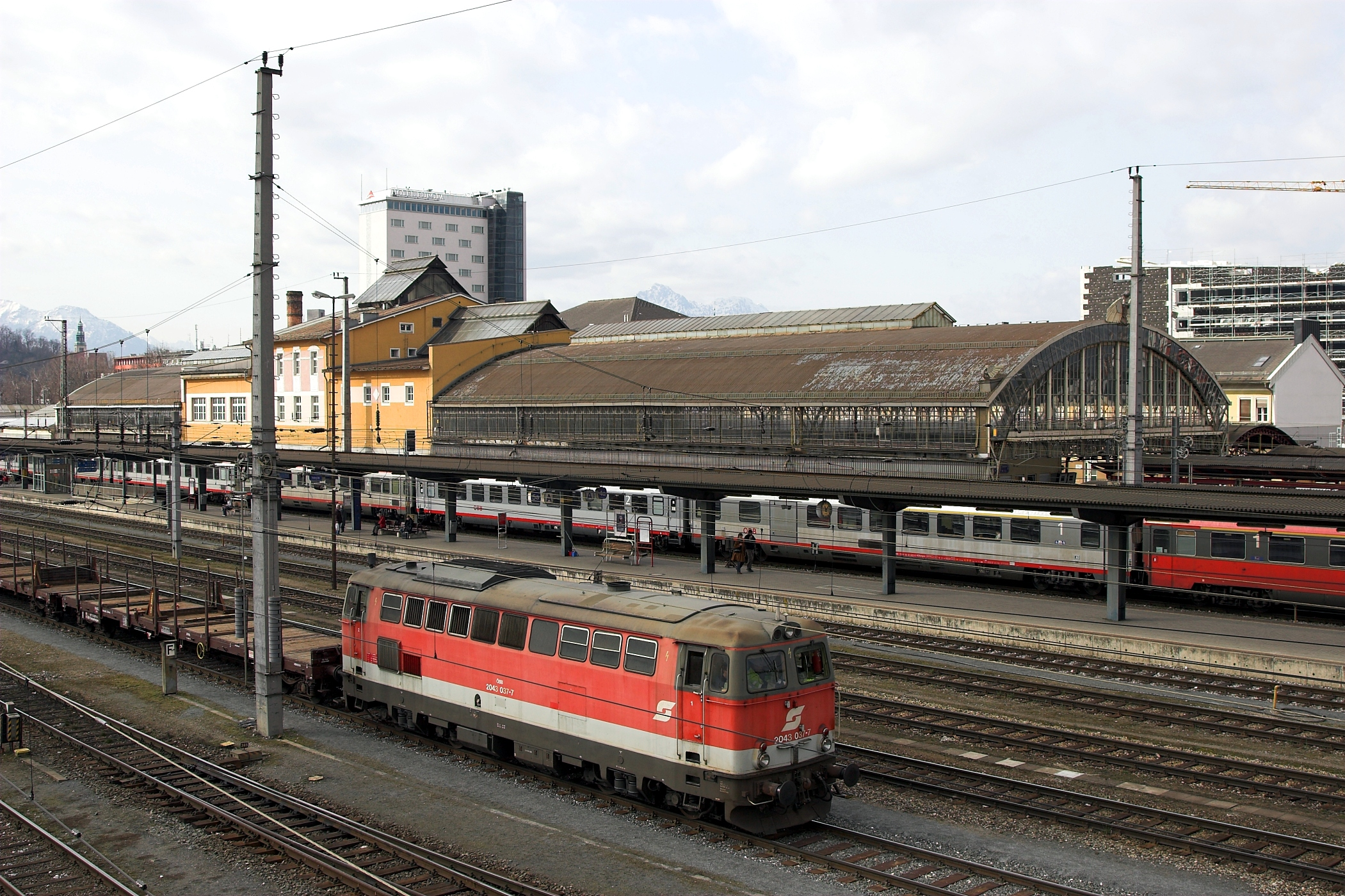
Island platform with the original station canopies.

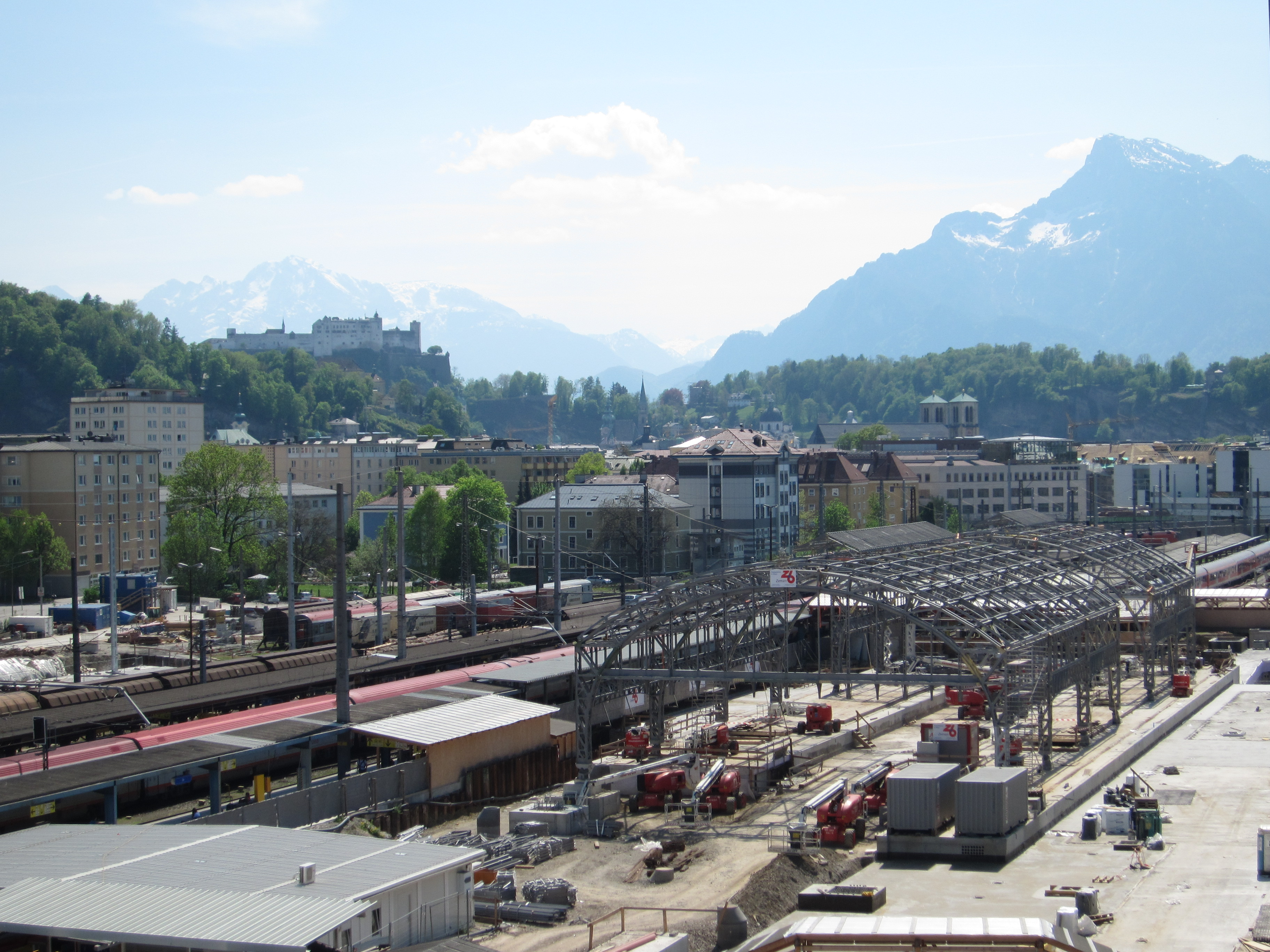
Reconstruction of the restored steel canopy.

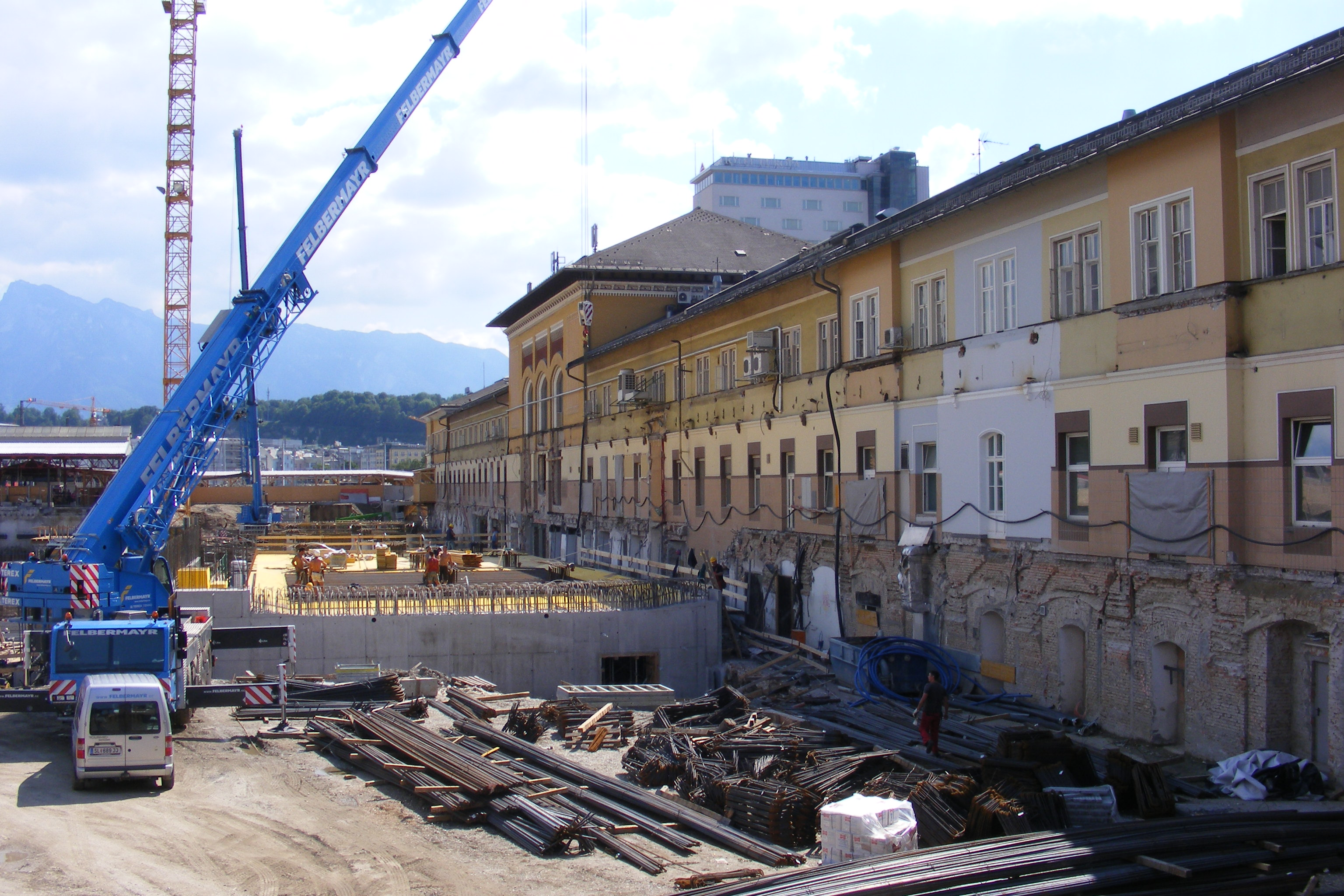
Track side of the station building during the renovations, 2010.

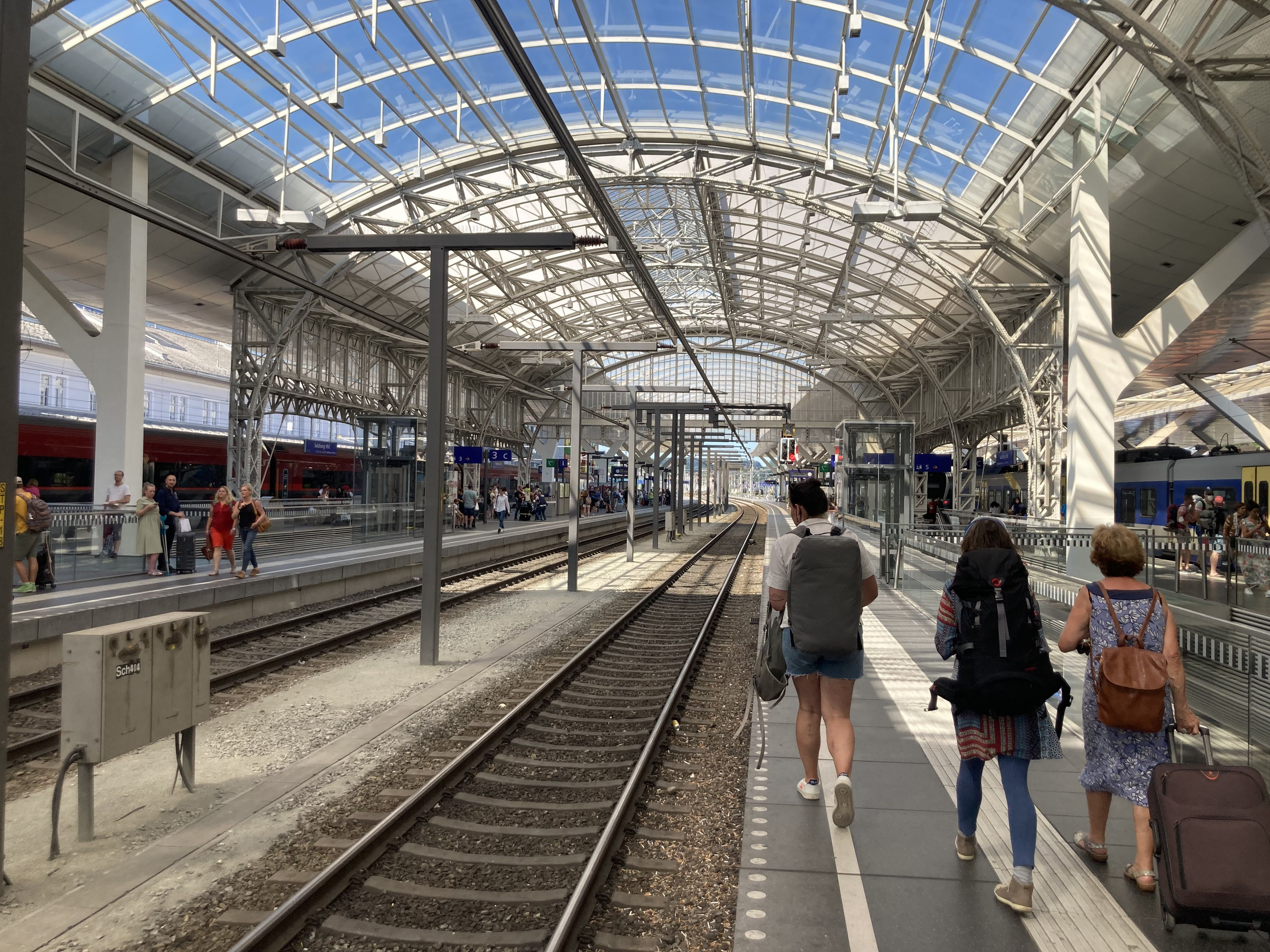
Platforms under historical canopy after renovation, 2022.

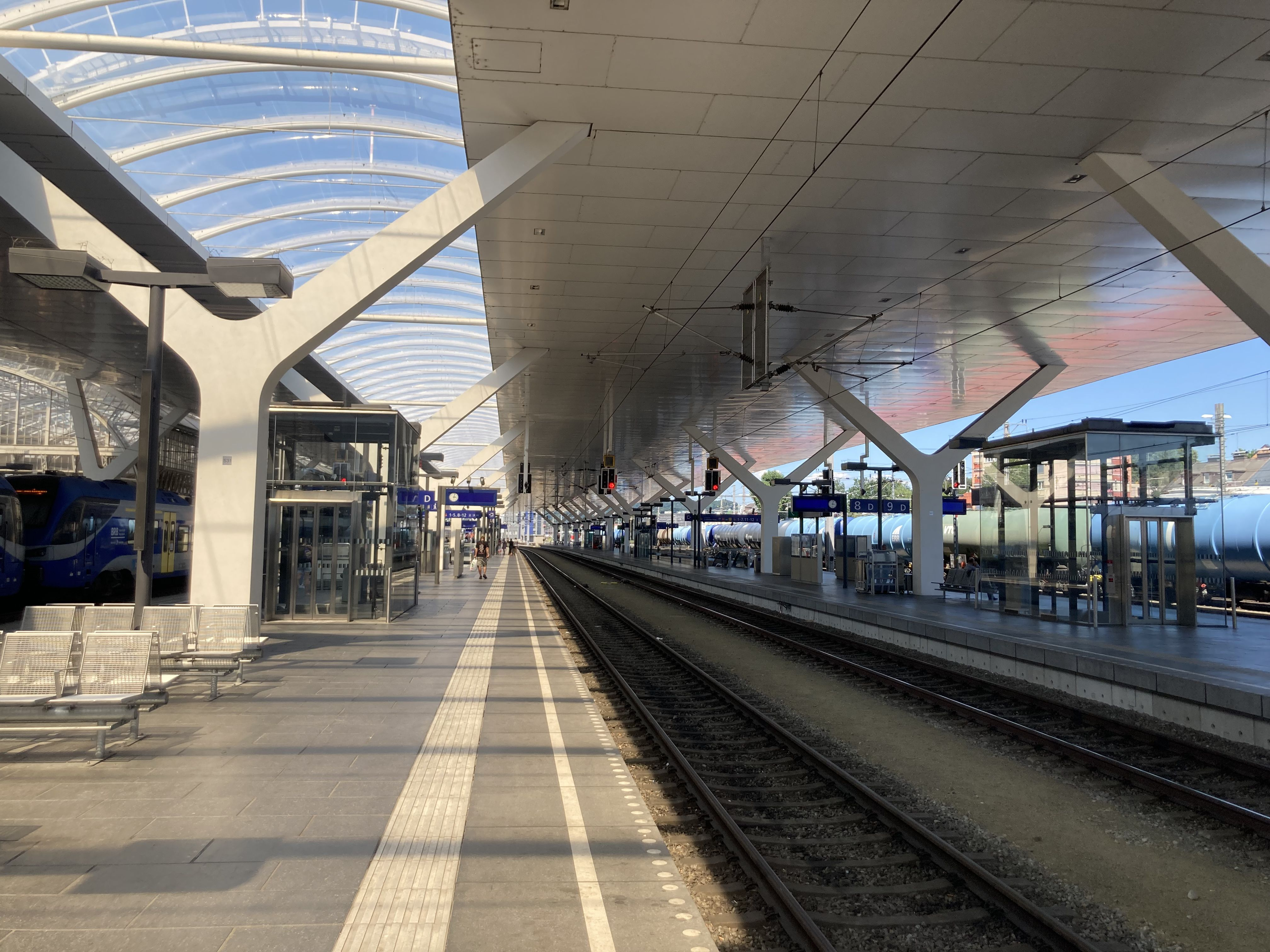
Platforms under newer canopy, 2022.

== Train services ==
=== Present-day services ===
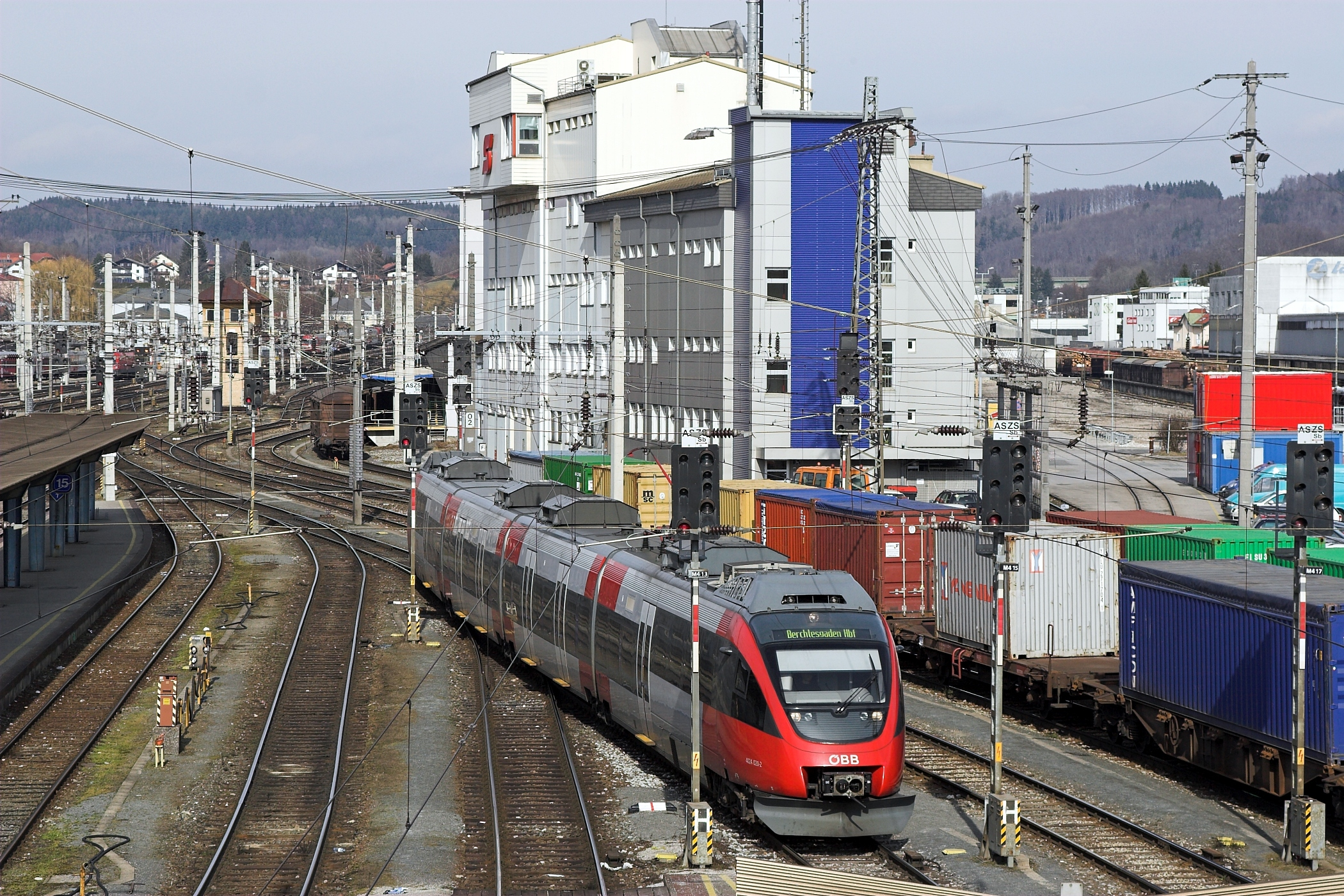
S-Bahn train in front of the central signal box.

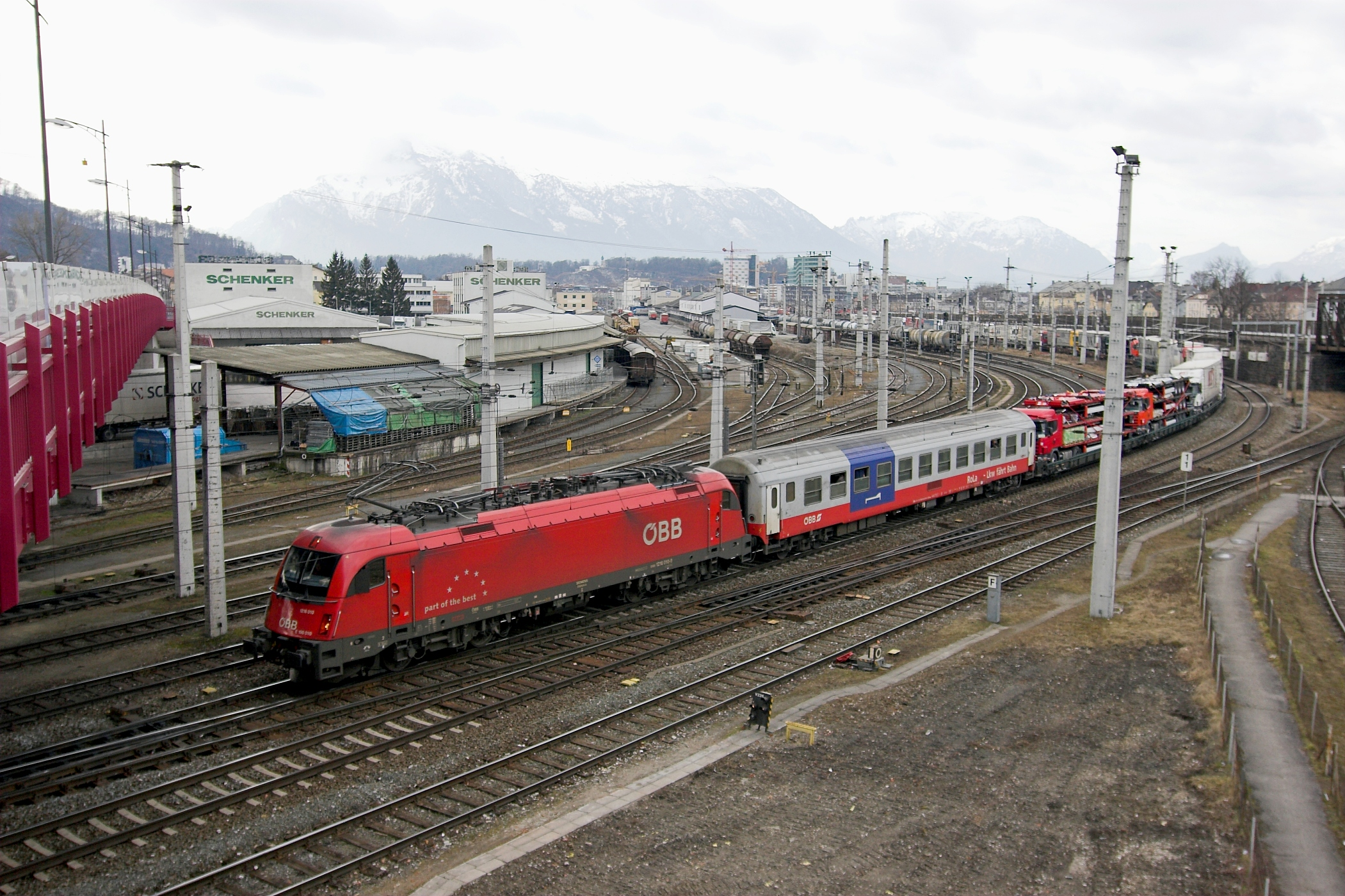
Rolling highway train at Itzling.

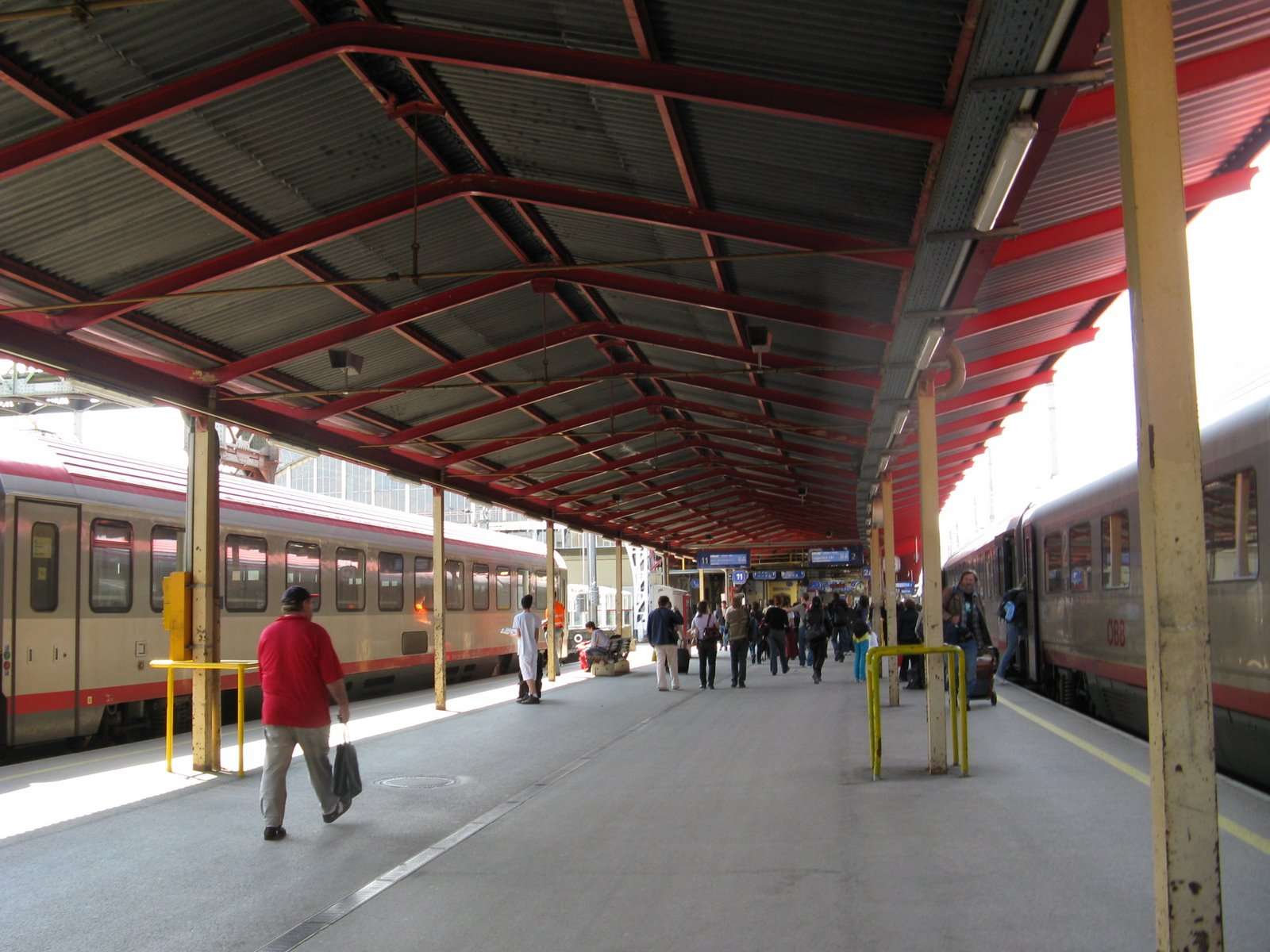
Platform for tracks 2 (through track) and 11 (terminating track).

Today, the station is a stop for ICE and IC long-distance trains, as well as local trains operated by Deutsche Bahn and ÖBB. The station is also a loading point for Motorail trains.

=== Long distance traffic ===
Line	Train route		Schedule
ICE 766/767	Innsbruck – Salzburg – Linz – Vienna West		
ICE 62	Frankfurt – Darmstadt – Heidelberg –	Stuttgart – Ulm – Augsburg – Munich – Rosenheim – Rosenheim – Prien – Freilassing – Salzburg – Villach – Klagenfurt – Graz	2 train pairs
ICE 62	Münster – Essen – Düsseldorf – Köln Messe/Deutz – Frankfurt Airport – Mannheim –	Stuttgart – Ulm – Augsburg – Munich – Rosenheim – Rosenheim – Prien – Freilassing – Salzburg – Villach – Klagenfurt – Graz	One train pair
EC/RJ 62	Munich – Salzburg (– Klagenfurt – Graz – Vienna – Vienna Airport)		2 train pairs to Salzburg, 1 train pair to Vienna, with change of direction
ICE/RJX 90	Munich – Rosenheim – Prien – Freilassing – Salzburg – Vöcklabruck – Linz – Vienna – Budapest Keleti		Every 2 hours
IC	Salzburg – Vienna West		
RE EC/RJ	Vienna West – Salzburg – Innsbruck – Bregenz / – Zürich		

=== Regional traffic ===
Line	Train route
M	Munich – Rosenheim – Salzburg
RB	Salzburg – Freilassing – Landshut
REX/R/RB	Attnang-Puchheim – Salzburg Taxham Europark
REX	Linz – / Braunau – Salzburg
REX	Salzburg – Wörgl

=== S-Bahn traffic ===
Line	Train route
	Salzburg Hbf (Tiefgeschoss) – Bürmoos – Lamprechtshausen
	Salzburg Hbf (Tiefgeschoss) – Bürmoos – Trimmelkam
	Salzburg Hbf – Straßwalchen
	Bad Reichenhall – Freilassing – Salzburg Hbf – Golling-Abtenau (individual trains to Schwarzach/St. Veit and Saalfelden)

== See also ==
- History of rail transport in Austria
- Rail transport in Austria
