= List of railway routes in Bavaria =

The list of railway routes in Bavaria contains all scheduled rail passenger routes in Bavaria. In addition, the cycle interval, the rolling stock used and the operators are listed.

With the timetable change on 13 December 2020, Bayerische Eisenbahngesellschaft (BEG), the purchaser of Bavarian regional rail services, introduced line numbers in Bavaria. The table reflects the status from the timetable change on 11 December 2022.

== Regional-Express and Regionalbahn lines ==
=== Lines 1, 10–19 (north) ===
Line	Frequency (in minutes)	Brand/line name	Route	Lines used	KBS	Operator	Rolling stock
RE 10	60 30 (extra trains in the peak: Würzburg – Kitzingen)	Mainfrankenbahn	Würzburg – Kitzingen – Neustadt (Aisch) – Fürth – Nuremberg	Nuremberg–Bamberg; Nuremberg–Würzburg	805	DB Regio Bayern	Alstom Coradia Continental (440)
RB 11	60	Mittelfrankenbahn	Fürth – Zirndorf – Cadolzburg	Fürth–Cadolzburg	808	DB Regio Bayern	Alstom Coradia LINT 54 (622) Alstom Coradia LINT 41 (648)
RB 12	60	Mittelfrankenbahn	(Nuremberg –) Fürth – Siegelsdorf – Wilhermsdorf – Markt Erlbach	Nuremberg–Würzburg; Nuremberg–Bamberg; Siegelsdorf–Markt Erlbach	807	DB Regio Bayern	Alstom Coradia LINT 54 (622) Alstom Coradia LINT 41 (648)
RB 13	120 (Gutenfürst–Hof, Mon–Fri: 60 min.)		Gera – Weida – Zeulenroda – Hof	Leipzig–Hof		Erfurter Bahn	Stadler RegioShuttle RS1 (650)
RE 14	120	Franken-Thüringen-Express	Saalfeld – Lichtenfels – Bamberg – Fürth – Nuremberg	Nuremberg–Würzburg; Bamberg–Hof; Hochstadt-Marktzeuln–Probstzella	820, 840	DB Regio Bayern	Bombardier Talent 2 (442)
RB 18	60		Bad Rodach – Coburg	Coburg–Bad Rodach	831	agilis Verkehrsgesellschaft	Stadler RegioShuttle RS1 (650)
RE 19	120	Franken-Thüringen-Express	Sonneberg – Bamberg – Fürth – Nuremberg	Nuremberg–Würzburg; Bamberg–Coburg; Coburg–Sonneberg	820	DB Regio Bayern	2 Siemens Vectron (at each end) + double-deck coaches

=== Lines 1, 10–19 (south) ===
Line	Frequency (in minutes)	Brand/line name	Route	Lines used	KBS	Operator	Rolling stock
RE 1	60 (Munich–Ingolstadt); 120 (Ingolstadt–Nuremberg)	München-Nürnberg-Express	Munich (– Petershausen) – Pfaffenhofen – Ingolstadt – Kinding – Allersberg – Nuremberg	Nuremberg–Ingolstadt; Munich–Treuchtlingen	900	DB Regio Bayern	Škoda 109 E3 (102) + Škoda push-pull set, Bombardier Twindexx Vario (445) (at each end) + 2 or 4 double-deck coaches
RB 13	60 (Mon–Fri 15 Augsburg–Friedberg, 30 Friedberg–Aichach)	Paartal-Bahn Netz Ammersee-Altmühltal	Augsburg – Friedberg – Aichach – Ingolstadt	Ingolstadt–Augsburg	983	Bayerische Regiobahn	Alstom Coradia LINT 41 (1648)
RB 14	60	Netz Ammersee-Altmühltal	Eichstätt Stadt – Eichstätt Bahnhof (– Ingolstadt)	Eichstätt Bahnhof–Eichstätt Stadt	991	Bayerische Regiobahn	Alstom Coradia LINT 41 (1648)
RB 15	60 (Mon–Fri); 120 (Sat, Sun)		Ulm – Günzburg – Donauwörth – Ingolstadt – Regensburg (Ingolstadt–Regensburg i. d. R. only Sat, Sun)	Regensburg–Ingolstadt; Ingolstadt–Neuoffingen; Augsburg–Ulm	930, 993	agilis Eisenbahngesellschaft	Alstom Coradia Continental (440)
RE 16	120		Nuremberg – Treuchtlingen – Donauwörth – Augsburg	Treuchtlingen–Nuremberg; Donauwörth–Treuchtlingen; Augsburg–Nördlingen	910	DB Regio Bayern	Bombardier Twindexx Vario (445) (at each end) + 4 double-deck coaches
RB 16	60 (Munich–Treuchtlingen); 120 (Treuchtlingen–Nuremberg)		Munich – Dachau – Pfaffenhofen – Ingolstadt – Eichstätt – Treuchtlingen – Roth – Nuremberg	Munich–Treuchtlingen; Treuchtlingen–Nuremberg	900, 990, 920	DB Regio Bayern	Bombardier Twindexx Vario (445) (at each end) + 2 or 4 double-deck coaches
RB 17	60 (Mon–Fri)		Ingolstadt – Regensburg	Regensburg–Ingolstadt	930, 993	agilis Eisenbahngesellschaft	Alstom Coradia Continental (440)
RE 18	120 (Sat, Sun)		Ingolstadt – Regensburg – Plattling)	Regensburg–Ingolstadt; Regensburg–Obertraubling; Obertraubling –Plattling	993, 880	agilis Eisenbahngesellschaft	Alstom Coradia Continental (440)

=== Lines 2, 20–29 (northwest) ===
Line	Frequency (in minutes)	Brand/line name	Route	Lines used	KBS	Operator	Rolling stock
RB 2	Some trains	Vogtlandbahn	Zwickau – Werdau– Plauen – Hof	Leipzig–Hof	544	Die Länderbahn	Stadler RegioShuttle RS1 (650)
RE 20	120	Franken-Thüringen-Express	Würzburg – Schweinfurt – Bamberg – Fürth – Nuremberg	Nuremberg–Bamberg; Bamberg–Rottendorf; Rottendorf–Würzburg	560, 810, 820, 840	DB Regio Bayern	Siemens Desiro HC (1462)
RB 21	60	Mittelfrankenbahn	Nürnberg Nordost – Eschenau – Gräfenberg	Nürnberg–Gräfenberg	861	DB Regio Bayern	Alstom Coradia LINT 54 (622) Alstom Coradia LINT 41 (648)
RB 22	60		Ebermannstadt – Forchheim (– Bamberg – Lichtenfels)	Forchheim–Beringersmühle	821	agilis Verkehrsgesellschaft	Stadler RegioShuttle RS1 (650)
RB 24	60 (most services broken in Bayreuth)		(Bad Rodach –) Coburg – Ebersdorf – Lichtenfels – Hochstadt-Marktzeuln – Kulmbach – Neuenmarkt-Wirsberg – Bayreuth – Kirchlaibach – Marktredwitz – Hof – Bad Steben	Coburg–Bad Rodach; Bamberg–Hof; Eisenach–Lichtenfels; Bayreuth–Neuenmarkt-Wirsberg; Weiden–Bayreuth	820, 850, 855, 857, 860, 867	agilis Verkehrsgesellschaft	Stadler RegioShuttle RS1 (650)
RE 25	120	alex	Prague – Plzeň – Furth im Wald – Cham – Schwandorf – Regensburg – Landshut – Munich	Schwandorf–Furth im Wald; Regensburg–Schwandorf; Munich–Regensburg	855, 875, 930	Die Länderbahn	Siemens ER20 / Siemens ES64U4 + coaches of different classes
RB 25	60	Franken-Thüringen-Express	Bamberg – Lichtenfels – Kronach (– Ludwigsstadt – Saalfeld)	Bamberg–Hof; Hochstadt-Marktzeuln–Probstzella	820, 840	DB Regio Bayern	Bombardier Talent 2 (442)
RB 26	60		Bamberg – Breitengüßbach – Ebern	Bamberg–Hof; Breitengüßbach–Maroldsweisach	826	agilis Verkehrsgesellschaft	Stadler RegioShuttle RS1 (650)
RE 28	Some trains	Franken-Thüringen-Express	Lichtenfels - Coburg (-Sonneberg)	Eisenach–Lichtenfels; Coburg-Ernstthal am Rennsteig		DB Regio Bayern	Siemens Desiro HC (1462)

=== Lines 2, 20–29 (southwest) ===
Line	Frequency (in minutes)	Brand/line name	Route	Lines used	KBS	Operator	Rolling stock
RE 2	120	alex	Hof – Marktredwitz – Weiden – Schwandorf – Regensburg – Landshut – Munich	Oberkotzau–Hof; Weiden–Oberkotzau; Regensburg–Weiden; Munich–Regensburg	855, 875, 930	Die Länderbahn	Siemens ER20 / Siemens ES64U4 + coaches of different classes
RE 22	60	Flughafenexpress	Nürnberg – Regensburg – Munich Airport	Munich–Regensburg; Neufahrn Link; Munich East–Munich Airport	930	DB Regio Bayern + agilis Verkehrsgesellschaft	Siemens Mireo
RB 22	60		Ebermannstadt – Forchheim (– Bamberg – Lichtenfels)	Forchheim–Beringersmühle	821	agilis Verkehrsgesellschaft	Stadler RegioShuttle RS1 (650)
RE 23	Some trains	Oberpfalzbahn	Marktredwitz – Weiden – Schwandorf – Regensburg	Weiden–Oberkotzau; Regensburg–Weiden	855	Die Länderbahn	Alstom Coradia LINT 41 (1648)
RB 23	60	Oberpfalzbahn	Marktredwitz – Weiden – Schwandorf – Regensburg	Weiden–Oberkotzau; Regensburg–Weiden	855	Die Länderbahn	Alstom Coradia LINT 41 (1648)
RE 25	120	alex	Prague – Plzeň – Furth im Wald – Cham – Schwandorf – Regensburg – Landshut – Munich	Schwandorf–Furth im Wald; Regensburg–Schwandorf; Munich–Regensburg	855, 875, 930	Die Länderbahn	Siemens ER20 / Siemens ES64U4 + coaches of different classes
RB 27	60	Oberpfalzbahn	Schwandorf – Cham (Oberpf) – Furth i Wald	Schwandorf–Furth im Wald	875	Die Länderbahn	Stadler RegioShuttle RS1 (650)
RB 28	120	Oberpfalzbahn	Cham (Oberpf) – Bad Kötzting – Lam	Cham–Lam	877	Die Länderbahn	Stadler RegioShuttle RS1 (650)
RB 29	120	Oberpfalzbahn	Cham (Oberpf) – Waldmünchen	Cham–Waldmünchen	876	Die Länderbahn	Stadler RegioShuttle RS1 (650)

=== Lines 3, 30–39 (north) ===
Line	Frequency (in minutes)	Brand/line name	Route	Lines used	KBS	Operator	Rolling stock
RE 3	60	Mitteldeutsche Regiobahn	Dresden – Zwickau – Reichenbach – Plauen – Hof	Leipzig–Hof	510	Bayerische Oberlandbahn	Alstom Coradia Continental (1440)
RE 30	120		Nuremberg – Hersbruck – Pegnitz – Bayreuth – Münchberg – Hof	Bamberg–Hof; Bayreuth–Neuenmarkt-Wirsberg; Schnabelwaid–Bayreuth; Nuremberg–Cheb	860	DB Regio Bayern	Class 612
RB 30	60	Mittelfrankenbahn	Nuremberg – Lauf (r Pegnitz) – Neunkirchen a Sand – Hersbruck (r Pegnitz) – Neuhaus (Pegnitz)	Nuremberg–Cheb	891	DB Regio Bayern	Alstom Coradia LINT 41 (648)
RE 31	120		Nuremberg – Hersbruck – Pegnitz – Kirchenlaibach – Marktredwitz – Hof	Schnabelwaid–Bayreuth; Nuremberg–Cheb; Weiden–Oberkotzau; Oberkotzau–Hof	855, 860	DB Regio Bayern	Class 612
RB 31	60	Mittelfrankenbahn	(Nuremberg –) Lauf (r Pegnitz) – Neunkirchen a Sand – Simmelsdorf-Hüttenbach	Nuremberg–Cheb; Neunkirchen–Simmelsdorf-Hüttenbach	891	DB Regio Bayern	Alstom Coradia LINT 41 (648)
RE 33	120		Nuremberg – Hersbruck – Pegnitz – Marktredwitz – Schirnding – Cheb	Nuremberg–Cheb	860	DB Regio Bayern	Class 612
RB 34	60		Weiden – Bayreuth – Weidenberg	Weiden–Bayreuth; Bayreuth–Weidenberg	862	agilis Verkehrsgesellschaft	Stadler RegioShuttle RS1 (650)
RE 32	120	Main-Saale Express	Coburg – Lichtenfels – Kulmbach – Neuenmarkt-Wirsberg – Bayreuth – Nuremberg	Bamberg–Hof; Bayreuth–Neuenmarkt-Wirsberg; Schnabelwaid–Bayreuth; Nuremberg–ChebNuremberg–Cheb	860	DB Regio Bayern	Class 612
RE 35	120	Main-Saale Express	Bamberg – Lichtenfels – Kulmbach – Neuenmarkt-Wirsberg – Hof	Bamberg–Hof	850, 860	DB Regio Bayern	Class 612
RE 38	120	Main-Saale Express	Lichtenfels – Kulmbach – Neuenmarkt-Wirsberg – Bayreuth	Bamberg–Hof, Bayreuth–Neuenmarkt-Wirsberg	850, 860	DB Regio Bayern	Class 612

=== Lines 3, 30–39 (south) ===
Line	Frequency (in minutes)	Brand/line name	Route	Lines used	KBS	Operator	Rolling stock
RE 3	60	Donau-Isar-Express	Passau – Plattling – Landau – Landshut – Freising – Munich	Nuremberg–Regensburg; Landshut–Plattling; Regensburg–Passau	880, 930, 931	DB Regio Bayern	Siemens Desiro HC
RB 32	60	Gäubodenbahn Südostbayernbahn	Bogen – Straubing – Radldorf (Niederbay) – Neufahrn	Neufahrn–Radldorf; Regensburg–Passau; Straubing–Bogen	932	DB RegioNetz Verkehrs GmbH	Class 628
RB 33	60		(Munich –) Freising – Moosburg – Landshut	Munich–Regensburg	930	DB Regio Bayern	Class 425
RB 35	60	Waldbahn	Plattling – Deggendorf – Zwiesel – Bayerisch Eisenstein	Plattling–Bayerisch Eisenstein	905	Die Länderbahn	Stadler RegioShuttle RS1 (650)
RB 36	60	Waldbahn	Zwiesel – Grafenau	Zwiesel–Grafenau	906	Die Länderbahn	Stadler RegioShuttle RS1 (650)
RB 37	60	Waldbahn	Zwiesel – Bodenmais	Zwiesel–Bodenmais	907	Die Länderbahn	Stadler RegioShuttle RS1 (650)
RB 38	60	Waldbahn	Gotteszell – Teisnach – Viechtach	Gotteszell–Viechtach	908	Die Länderbahn	Stadler RegioShuttle RS1 (650)

=== Lines 4, 40–49 (north) ===
Line	Frequency (in minutes)	Brand/line name	Route	Lines used	KBS	Operator	Rolling stock
RE 40	60		Nuremberg – Hersbruck (r Pegnitz) – Neukirchen (b Sulzb) – Amberg – Schwandorf – Regensburg	Nuremberg–Cheb; Hersbruck–Pommelsbrunn; Nuremberg–Schwandorf; Hof–Regensburg	855, 870	DB Regio Bayern	Class 612
RB 40	60 (Schweinfurt–Mellrichstadt); 120 (Mellrichstadt–Meiningen)	Unterfranken-Shuttle	Schweinfurt – Ebenhausen – Mellrichstadt – Meiningen	Schweinfurt–Meiningen	570, 815	Erfurter Bahn	Stadler RegioShuttle RS1 (650)
RE 41	60		Nuremberg – Hersbruck (r Pegnitz) – Neukirchen (b Sulzb) – Weiden (Oberpf) – Neustadt (Waldnaab)	Nuremberg–Cheb; Hersbruck–Pommelsbrunn; Nuremberg–Schwandorf; Neukirchen–Regensburg; Neukirchen–Weiden	855, 870	DB Regio Bayern	Class 612
RE 43	Some trains		Nuremberg – Hersbruck (l Pegnitz) – Neukirchen (b Sulzb) – Amberg (– Schwandorf – Regensburg)	Nuremberg–Schwandorf; Schwandorf–Regensburg	855, 870	DB Regio Bayern	Class 612
RE 47	Some trains		Nuremberg – Hersbruck (r Pegnitz) – Neukirchen (b Sulzb) – Amberg – Schwandorf – Cham (Oberpf) – Furth i Wald	Nuremberg–Cheb; Hersbruck–Pommelsbrunn; Nuremberg–Schwandorf; Schwandorf–Furth im Wald	870, 875	DB Regio Bayern	Class 612

=== Lines 4, 40–49 (south) ===
Line	Frequency (in minutes)	Brand/line name	Route	Lines used	KBS	Operator	Rolling stock
RE 4	3 train pairs Mon-Fri	Südostbayernbahn	Munich – Dorfen – Mühldorf (– Simbach (Inn))	Munich–Simbach	940, 941	DB Regio Netz Verkehrs GmbH	Class 218 / Bombardier Traxx P160 DE ME (245) + double-deck coaches
RB 40	60	Südostbayernbahn	Munich – Markt Schwaben – Dorfen – Mühldorf	Munich–Simbach	940	DB Regio Netz Verkehrs GmbH	Class 218 / Bombardier Traxx P160 DE ME (245) + double-deck coaches class 628 (early and late)
RB 41	60	Südostbayernbahn	Mühldorf – Marktl – Simbach	Munich–Simbach	941	DB Regio Netz Verkehrs GmbH	Class 628
RB 42	60	Südostbayernbahn	Mühldorf – Tüßling – Altötting – Burghausen	Mühldorf–Freilassing; Tüßling–Burghausen	942	DB Regio Netz Verkehrs GmbH	Class 628 Class 218 / Bombardier Traxx P160 DE ME (245) + double-deck coaches (1 train pair, Mon-Fri)
RB 44	120 (Landshut–Mühldorf); 60 (Mühldorf–Rosenheim)	Südostbayernbahn	Landshut – Vilsbiburg – Neumarkt-St Veit – Mühldorf – Waldkraiburg – Wasserburg (Inn) – Rott (Inn) – Rosenheim	Neumarkt-St Veit–Landshut; Mühldorf–Frontenhausen-Marklkofen; Mühldorf–Rosenheim	944	DB Regio Netz Verkehrs GmbH	Class 628
RB 45	120 (Landshut–Mühldorf); 60 (Mühldorf–Salzburg)	Südostbayernbahn	Landshut – Vilsbiburg – Neumarkt-St Veit – Mühldorf – Garching (Alz) – Laufen (Oberbay) – Freilassing – Salzburg	Neumarkt-St Veit–Landshut; Mühldorf–Frontenhausen-Marklkofen; Mühldorf–Freilassing	945	DB Regio Netz Verkehrs GmbH	Class 628 Class 218 / Bombardier Traxx P160 DE ME (245) + double-deck coaches (Mon-Fri, 1 train pair for school traffic)
RB 46	60	Südostbayernbahn	Passau – Fürstenzell – Pocking – Pfarrkirchen – Neumarkt-St Veit – Mühldorf	Passau–Neumarkt-St Veit; Mühldorf–Frontenhausen-Marklkofen	946	DB Regio Netz Verkehrs GmbH	Class 628
RB 47	120	Südostbayernbahn	Mühldorf – Garching (Alz) – Trostberg – Hörpolding (– Traunreut – Traunstein)	Mühldorf–Freilassing; Traunstein–Garching	947	DB Regio Netz Verkehrs GmbH	Class 628
RB 48	60	Südostbayernbahn	Wasserburg (Inn) – Ebersberg (Oberbay) (– Grafing – Munich)	Grafing–Wasserburg; Munich–Rosenheim	948	DB Regio Netz Verkehrs GmbH	Class 628
RB 49	60	Südostbayernbahn	Traunreut – Hörpolding – Traunstein	Traunstein–Garching	947	DB Regio Netz Verkehrs GmbH	Class 628

=== Lines 5, 50–59 (east) ===
Line	Frequency (in minutes)	Brand/line name	Route	Lines used	KBS	Operator	Rolling stock
RE 5	60	Netz Chiemgau-Inntal	Munich – Rosenheim – Bad Endorf – Prien a Chiemsee – Traunstein – Freilassing – Salzburg	Munich–Rosenheim; Rosenheim–Salzburg	950, 951	Bayerische Oberlandbahn	Stadler Flirt 3
RE 50	120		Nuremberg – Neumarkt – Regensburg – Landshut – Straubing – Plattling	Nuremberg–Regensburg; Regensburg–Munich	880	DB Regio Bayern	Bombardier Traxx P160 AC2 (146.2) + double-deck coaches
RB 51	60		Neumarkt – Regensburg (– Straubing – Plattling)	Nuremberg–Regensburg; Regensburg–Passau	880	agilis Eisenbahngesellschaft	Alstom Coradia Continental (440)
RB 52	60	Chiemgau-Bahn; Südostbayernbahn	Prien a Chiemsee – Aschau	Prien a Chiemsee–Aschau	952	DB RegioNetz Verkehrs GmbH	Class 628
RB 53	60	Netz Berchtesgaden-Ruhpolding	Traunstein – Siegsdorf – Ruhpolding	Traunstein–Ruhpolding	953	Bayerische Oberlandbahn	Stadler Flirt 3 (1427)
RB 54	60	Netz Chiemgau-Inntal	Munich – Grafing – Rosenheim – Kufstein	Munich–Rosenheim; Rosenheim–Kufstein	950, 951	Bayerische Oberlandbahn	Stadler Flirt 3
RB 55	60	Netz Bayerisches Oberland	Munich – Holzkirchen – Schliersee – Bayrischzell	Munich–Holzkirchen; Holzkirchen–Schliersee; Schliersee–Bayrischzell	955	Bayerische Oberlandbahn	Alstom Coradia LINT 54
RB 56	60; 30 (at times)	Netz Bayerisches Oberland	Munich – Holzkirchen – Schaftlach – Bad Tölz – Lenggries	Munich–Holzkirchen; Holzkirchen–Lenggries	956	Bayerische Oberlandbahn	Alstom Coradia LINT 54
RB 57	60; 30 (at times)	Netz Bayerisches Oberland	Munich – Holzkirchen – Schaftlach – Tegernsee	Munich–Holzkirchen; Holzkirchen–Lenggries; Schaftlach–Tegernsee	957	Bayerische Oberlandbahn	Alstom Coradia LINT 54
RB 58	60	Netz Chiemgau-Inntal	Munich – Deisenhofen – Holzkirchen – Bad Aibling – Rosenheim (Munich–Deisenhofen only Mon–Fri, Deisenhofen–Holzkirchen only some trains)	Munich–Holzkirchen; Holzkirchen–Rosenheim	958	Bayerische Oberlandbahn	Stadler Flirt 3
RB 59	60	Südostbayernbahn	Traunstein – Waging	Traunstein–Waging	959	DB RegioNetz Verkehrs GmbH	Class 628

=== Lines 5, 50–59 (northwest) ===
Line	Frequency (in minutes)	Brand/line name	Route	Lines used	KBS	Operator	Rolling stock
RB 50	120 mornings only (Gemünden–Bad Kissingen); 60 (Bad Kissingen–Schweinfurt)	Unterfranken-Shuttle	Gemünden – Gräfendorf – Hammelburg – Bad Kissingen – Ebenhausen – Schweinfurt	Gemünden–Bad Kissingen; Ebenhausen–Bad Kissingen; Schweinfurt–Meiningen	803, 815	Erfurter Bahn	Stadler RegioShuttle RS1 (650)
RB 53	60	Mainfrankenbahn	Bamberg – Schweinfurt – Würzburg – Gemünden – Jossa (– Schlüchtern)	Bamberg–Rottendorf; Rottendorf–Würzburg; Würzburg–Aschaffenburg; Flieden–Gemünden	800, 801, 810	DB Regio Bayern	Alstom Coradia Continental (440)
RE 54	120	Main-Spessart-Express	Frankfurt – Maintal – Hanau – Aschaffenburg – Würzburg – Schweinfurt – Haßfurt – Bamberg	Frankfurt Süd–Aschaffenburg; Würzburg–Aschaffenburg; Rottendorf–Würzburg; Bamberg–Rottendorf	810	DB Regio Bayern	Bombardier Twindexx Vario (445) ("sandwich") + 2 double-deck coaches
RE 55	120	Main-Spessart-Express	Frankfurt – Offenbach – Hanau – Aschaffenburg – Würzburg	Frankfurt Süd–Aschaffenburg; Würzburg–Aschaffenburg	640, 800	DB Regio Bayern	Bombardier Twindexx Vario (445) ("sandwich") + 2 double-deck coaches
RE 55	2 train pairs (Sat, Sun)	Freizeit-Express Frankenland	Frankfurt – Offenbach – Hanau – Aschaffenburg – Schweinfurt – Haßfurt – Bamberg	Frankfurt Süd–Aschaffenburg; Würzburg–Aschaffenburg; Gemünden–Waigolshausen; Bamberg–Rottendorf		DB Regio Bayern	Bombardier Twindexx Vario (445) ("sandwich") + 2 double-deck coaches
RB 56	60 (Mon–Fri); 120 (Sat, Sun)	Kahlgrundbahn	Hanau – Kahl – Alzenau – Michelbach – Schöllkrippen	Kahl–Schöllkrippen	642	DB RegioNetz Verkehrs GmbH	Siemens Desiro Classic (642)
RE 57	120	Mainfranken-Thüringen-Express	Würzburg – Schweinfurt – Ebenhausen – Bad Kissingen coupled with RE 7 (TH) in Ebenhausen	Würzburg–Rottendorf; Bamberg–Rottendorf; Schweinfurt–Meiningen; Ebenhausen–Bad Kissingen	570, 815	DB Regio Südost	Class 612
RB 58	60		Rüsselsheim – Frankfurt Airport – Hanau – Aschaffenburg – Laufach	Frankfurt Süd–Aschaffenburg; Würzburg–Aschaffenburg	640	Hessische Landesbahn	Alstom Coradia Continental
RE 59	some trains		Frankfurt Airport – Hanau – Aschaffenburg	Frankfurt Süd–Aschaffenburg	640	Hessische Landesbahn	Alstom Coradia Continental

=== Lines 5, 50–59 (southwest) ===
Line	Frequency (in minutes)	Brand/line name	Route	Lines used	KBS	Operator	Rolling stock
RE 5	60		Friedrichshafen Stadt – Ravensburg – Aulendorf – Ulm (– Göppingen – Plochingen – Stuttgart)	Lindau–Friedrichshafen	731, 750, 751	DB Regio Baden-Württemberg	Bombardier Traxx P160 AC2 (146.2) + 4 double-deck coaches
RE 50	120	Aalen–Ulm railway	Aalen – Heidenheim – Langenau – Ulm	Ulm–Aalen	757	DB Regio Baden-Württemberg	Class 612

=== Lines 6, 60–69 (north) ===
Line	Frequency (in minutes)	Brand/line name	Route	Lines used	KBS	Operator	Rolling stock
RE 60	60 (Mon–Fri)		Nürnberg – Roth – Treuchtlingen	Treuchtlingen–Nürnberg	910	DB Regio Bayern	Bombardier Twindexx Vario (445) ("sandwich") + 2 or 4 double-deck coaches
RB 61	60	Mittelfrankenbahn	Roth – Hilpoltstein	Roth–Hilpoltstein	911	DB Regio Bayern	Alstom Coradia LINT 41 (648)
RB 62	60	Seenland-Bahn	Pleinfeld – Gunzenhausen – Wassertrüdingen	Gunzenhausen–Pleinfeld	912	DB Regio Bayern	Alstom Coradia LINT 41 (648)

=== Lines 6, 60–69 (south) ===
Line	Frequency (in minutes)	Brand/line name	Route	Lines used	KBS	Operator	Rolling stock
RB 6	60	Werdenfelsbahn	Munich – Tutzing – Weilheim – Murnau – Garmisch-Partenkirchen – Mittenwald – Seefeld (– Innsbruck)	Munich–Garmisch-Partenkirchen; Garmisch-Partenkirchen–Innsbruck	960, 965	DB Regio Bayern	Bombardier Talent 2 (442)
RB 60	60	Werdenfelsbahn	Munich – Tutzing – Weilheim – Murnau – Garmisch-Partenkirchen – Reutte – Vils Stadt – Pfronten-Steinach	Munich–Garmisch-Partenkirchen; Garmisch-Partenkirchen–Kempten	960, 965	DB Regio Bayern	Bombardier Talent 2 (442)
RE 61	Some trains	Werdenfelsbahn	Munich – Weilheim – Murnau – Garmisch-Partenkirchen – Mittenwald	Munich–Garmisch-Partenkirchen; Garmisch-Partenkirchen–Innsbruck	960, 965	DB Regio Bayern	Bombardier Talent 2 (442)
RE 62	Some trains	Werdenfelsbahn	Munich – Weilheim – Murnau – Garmisch-Partenkirchen – Lermoos	Munich–Garmisch-Partenkirchen; Garmisch-Partenkirchen–Kempten	960, 965	DB Regio Bayern	Bombardier Talent 2 (442)
RB 63	60	Ammergau-Bahn; Werdenfelsbahn	Murnau – Bad Kohlgrub – Oberammergau	Murnau–Oberammergau	963	DB Regio Bayern	Bombardier Talent 2 (442)
RB 64	60	Zugspitzbahn	Garmisch – Grainau	Bayerische Zugspitzbahn		Bayerische Zugspitzbahn Bergbahn	Bayerische Zugspitzbahn rollingstock
RB 65	60	Werdenfelsbahn	Munich – Tutzing – Weilheim	Munich–Garmisch-Partenkirchen	960, 961	DB Regio Bayern	Bombardier Talent 2 (442)
RB 66	60	Kochelsee-Bahn	Munich – Tutzing – Kochel	Munich–Garmisch-Partenkirchen; Tutzing–Kochel	960, 961	DB Regio Bayern	Bombardier Talent 2 (442)
RB 67	60	Pfaffenwinkel-Bahn; Ammersee-Bahn	Augsburg – Mering – Geltendorf – Dießen – Weilheim – Peißenberg – Schongau	Munich–Augsburg; Mering–Weilheim; Weilheim–Peißenberg; Schongau–Peißenberg	962, 985	Bayerische Regiobahn	Alstom Coradia LINT 41 (1648)
RB 68	3 train pairs	Netz Ostallgäu-Lechfeld	Munich – Geltendorf – Kaufering – Buchloe – Kaufbeuren – Biessenhofen – Marktoberdorf – Füssen	Munich–Buchloe; Buchloe–Lindau; Biessenhofen–Marktoberdorf; Marktoberdorf–Füssen	970, 974, 987	Bayerische Regiobahn	Alstom Coradia LINT 41 (1648) Alstom Coradia LINT 54 (622) Alstom Coradia LINT 81(620)
RB 69	60	Lechfeld-Bahn Netz Ostallgäu-Lechfeld	Augsburg – Bobingen – Kaufering – Landsberg (Kaufering–Landsberg 30 min.)	Augsburg–Buchloe; Bobingen–Kaufering; Kaufering–Landsberg am Lech	986, 987	Bayerische Regiobahn	Alstom Coradia LINT 41 (1648) Alstom Coradia LINT 54 (622) Alstom Coradia LINT 81(620)

=== Lines 7, 70–79 (north) ===
Line	Frequency (in minutes)	Brand/line name	Route	Lines used	KBS	Operator	Rolling stock
RE 7	120	Mainfranken-Thüringen-Express	Würzburg – Schweinfurt – Ebenhausen – Grimmenthal – Suhl – Arnstadt – Erfurt coupled with RE 57 to Ebenhausen	Würzburg–Rottendorf; Rottendorf–Bamberg; Schweinfurt–Meiningen	570, 815	DB Regio Südost	Class 612
RB 75	60	Rhein-Main-Bahn	Aschaffenburg – Babenhausen – Darmstadt – Mainz – Wiesbaden	Mainz–Aschaffenburg	651	Hessische Landesbahn	Alstom Coradia Continental(1440)
RB 79	Some trains (Mon–Fri)	Mainfrankenbahn	Aschaffenburg – Gemünden (– Würzburg – Schweinfurt – Bamberg)	Würzburg–Aschaffenburg; Würzburg–Rottendorf; Rottendorf–Bamberg	800, 805	DB Regio Bayern	Alstom Coradia Continental (440) Class 425

=== Lines 7, 17, 70–79 (south) ===
Line	Frequency (in minutes)	Brand/line name	Route	Lines used	KBS	Operator	Rolling stock
RE 7	120		Augsburg – Buchloe – Kaufbeuren – Kempten – Immenstadt – Hergatz – Lindau-Reutin	Augsburg–Buchloe; Buchloe–Lindau	970	DB Regio Bayern	Class 612
RE 17	120		Augsburg – Buchloe – Kaufbeuren – Kempten – Immenstadt – Oberstdorf	Augsburg–Buchloe; Buchloe–Lindau; Immenstadt–Oberstdorf	970	DB Regio Bayern	Class 612
RE 7 RE 17	Some trains		(Nuremberg – Treuchtlingen – Donauwörth –) Augsburg – Buchloe – Kaufbeuren – Kempten – Immenstadt – Lindau-Reutin/Oberstdorf	Treuchtlingen–Nuremberg; Augsburg–Buchloe; Buchloe–Lindau; Immenstadt–Oberstdorf	910, 970	DB Regio Bayern	Class 612
RE 70	120		Munich – Kaufering – Buchloe – Kaufbeuren – Kempten – Immenstadt – Hergatz – Lindau-Reutin	Munich–Buchloe; Buchloe–Lindau	970	DB Regio Bayern	Class 612 Pesa Link III (633)
RE 76	120		Munich – Kaufering – Buchloe – Kaufbeuren – Kempten – Immenstadt – Oberstdorf	Munich–Buchloe; Buchloe–Lindau; Immenstadt–Oberstdorf	970	DB Regio Bayern	Class 612 Pesa Link III (633)
RE 71	120	Kneipp-Lechfeld-Bahn	Augsburg – Buchloe – Türkheim – Mindelheim – Memmingen	Augsburg–Buchloe; Buchloe–Memmingen	971, 987	DB Regio Bayern	Class 612
RE 72	120	E-Netz Allgäu	Munich – Geltendorf – Kaufering – Buchloe – Türkheim – Mindelheim – Memmingen	Munich–Buchloe; Buchloe–Memmingen	970, 971	Arverio Bayern	Stadler Flirt 3 (1428)
RE 73	120; 60 (Türkheim–Bad Wörishofen)	Kneipp-Lechfeld-Bahn	(Augsburg – Buchloe –) Türkheim – Bad Wörishofen	Türkheim–Bad Wörishofen	971, 987	DB Regio Bayern	Class 612
RB 73	60	Außerfern-Bahn	Kempten – Durach – Oy-Mittelberg – Pfronten-Steinach	Garmisch-Partenkirchen–Kempten	973	DB Regio Bayern	Pesa Link III (633)
RB 74	60	Vorortverkehr München–Buchloe	München – München-Pasing – Fürstenfeldbruck – Geltendorf – Kaufering – Buchloe	München–Buchloe	970	DB Regio Bayern	Alstom Coradia Continental (440)
RE 75	60		Ulm – Memmingen – Kempten – Immenstadt – Oberstdorf	Augsburg–Ulm; Neu-Ulm–Kempten; Buchloe–Lindau; Immenstadt–Oberstdorf	975	DB Regio Bayern	Pesa Link III (633)
RB 77	60	Netz Ostallgäu-Lechfeld	Augsburg – Bobingen – Buchloe – Kaufbeuren – Biessenhofen – Marktoberdorf – Füssen	Augsburg–Buchloe; Buchloe–Lindau; Biessenhofen–Marktoberdorf; Marktoberdorf–Füssen	974, 987	Bayerische Regiobahn	Alstom Coradia LINT 41 (648) Alstom Coradia LINT 54 (622) Alstom Coradia LINT 81 (620)
RB 78	60	Mittelschwabenbahn	Günzburg – Krumbach (Schwab) (– Mindelheim)	Günzburg–Mindelheim	978	DB Regio Bayern	Stadler RegioShuttle RS1 (650)
RE 79	120 (Augsburg–Buchloe); 60 (Buchloe–Kempten)		Augsburg – Bobingen – Buchloe – Kaufbeuren – Kempten	Augsburg–Buchloe; Buchloe–Lindau	974	DB Regio Bayern	Pesa Link III (633)

- RE 73 runs together with RE 71 to Türkheim (Bay), then shuttles three times between Türkheim and Bad Wörishofen and is then coupled with the RE 71 returning from Memmingen. This does not result in a regular interval service.

=== Lines 8, 80–89 (north) ===
Line	Frequency (in minutes)	Brand/line name	Route	Lines used	KBS	Operator	Rolling stock
RE 8	60		Würzburg – Lauda – Osterburken – Bad Friedrichshall – Heilbronn – Bietigheim-Bissingen – Stuttgart	Treuchtlingen–Würzburg; Mosbach-Neckarelz–Würzburg-Heidingsfeld West	780	Arverio Baden-Württemberg	Stadler Flirt 3 (1428,1430)
RB 84	60 (Mon–Fri); 120 (Sat, Sun)	Madonnenlandbahn	(Aschaffenburg –) Miltenberg – Amorbach – Walldürn – Seckach	Aschaffenburg–Miltenberg; Seckach–Miltenberg	781, 784	DB RegioNetz Verkehrs GmbH	Siemens Desiro Classic (642)
RB 85	60 (Sat+Sun) only Würzburg - Lauda	Mainfrankenbahn	Würzburg – Reichenberg – Lauda – Eubigheim – Osterburken	Treuchtlingen–Würzburg; Mosbach-Neckarelz–Würzburg-Heidingsfeld West	780	DB Regio Bayern	Alstom Coradia Continental (440) Class 425
RE 87	120 (Mon–Fri)	Maintalbahn	Miltenberg – Wertheim (– Lauda – Bad Mergentheim)	Miltenberg West–Wertheim	781	DB RegioNetz Verkehrs GmbH	Siemens Desiro Classic (642)
RE 87	120	Main-Tauber-Express	Aschaffenburg – Miltenberg – Wertheim – Lauda – Crailsheim	Aschaffenburg–Miltenberg; Miltenberg West–Wertheim	781, 782	DB RegioNetz Verkehrs GmbH	Siemens Desiro Classic (642)
RB 88	60	Maintalbahn	Aschaffenburg – Miltenberg	Aschaffenburg–Miltenberg	781	DB RegioNetz Verkehrs GmbH	Siemens Desiro Classic (642)

=== Lines 8, 80–89 (south) ===
Line	Frequency (in minutes)	Brand/line name	Route	Lines used	KBS	Operator	Rolling stock
RE 80	60	Augsburger Netze Los 1	Würzburg – Ansbach – Treuchtlingen – Donauwörth – Augsburg – Munich	Würzburg–Treuchtlingen; Donauwörth–Treuchtlingen; Munich–Augsburg	920, 910, 980	Arverio Bayern	Siemens Mireo (463) Siemens Desiro HC (462)
RB 80	Some trains in the peak	Mainfrankenbahn	Würzburg – Winterhausen – Marktbreit	Würzburg–Treuchtlingen	920	DB Regio Bayern	Class 425 Alstom Coradia Continental (440) Siemens Desiro Classic (642)
RB 81	60	Mittelfrankenbahn	Neustadt (Aisch) – Bad Windsheim – Steinach	Steinach bei Rothenburg–Dombühl	806	DB Regio Bayern	Alstom Coradia LINT 41 (648)
RB 82	60	Mittelfrankenbahn	Steinach – Rothenburg	Steinach–Rothenburg	921	DB Regio Bayern	Alstom Coradia LINT 54 (622) Alstom Coradia LINT 41 (648)
RB 86	60	Augsburger Netze Los 1	Dinkelscherben – Augsburg – Mering – Munich	Augsburg–Nördlingen; Munich–Augsburg	910, 980	Arverio Bayern	Siemens Mireo (463) Siemens Desiro HC (462)
RB 87	60	Augsburger Netze Los 1	Donauwörth – Meitingen – Augsburg – Mering – Munich	Augsburg–Nördlingen; Munich–Augsburg	910, 980	Arverio Bayern	Siemens Mireo (463) Siemens Desiro HC (462)
RE 89	120	Augsburger Netze Los 1	Aalen – Nördlingen – Donauwörth	Stuttgart–Nördlingen; Augsburg–Nördlingen	910, 980, 989	Arverio Bayern	Siemens Mireo (463) Siemens Desiro HC (462)
RB 89	120	Augsburger Netze Los 1	Aalen – Nördlingen – Donauwörth	Stuttgart–Nördlingen; Augsburg–Nördlingen	989	Arverio Bayern	Siemens Mireo (463) Siemens Desiro HC (462)

=== Lines 9, 90–99 (north) ===
Line	Frequency (in minutes)	Brand/line name	Route	Lines used	KBS	Operator	Rolling stock
RE 90	120		Nuremberg – Ansbach – Crailsheim – Schwäbisch Hall-Hessental – Waiblingen – Stuttgart	Nuremberg–Crailsheim	785, 786	Arverio Baden-Württemberg	Stadler Flirt 3
RB 91	60 (Mon–Fri); 120 (Sat, Sun)	Mittelfrankenbahn	Wicklesgreuth – Windsbach	Wicklesgreuth–Windsbach	922	DB Regio Bayern	Alstom Coradia LINT 41 (648)
RB 95	120	Oberpfalzbahn	Marktredwitz – Schirnding – Cheb – Hof	Nuremberg–Cheb	860	Die Länderbahn	Alstom Coradia LINT 41 (1648)
RB 96	60		Hof – Rehau – Selb-Plößberg – Selb Stadt	Cheb–Oberkotzau; Holenbrunn–Selb	858	agilis Verkehrsgesellschaft	Stadler RegioShuttle RS1 (650)
RB 97	60		Bayreuth – Kirchlaibach – Marktredwitz – Hof – Bad Steben	Weiden–Bayreuth	855, 857, 860, 867	agilis Verkehrsgesellschaft	Stadler RegioShuttle RS1 (650)
RB 98	60		Helmbrechts – Münchberg (– Hof)	Münchberg–Selbitz	853	agilis Verkehrsgesellschaft	Stadler RegioShuttle RS1 (650)
RB 99	120		Hof – Münchberg	Bamberg–Hof	850, 857	agilis Verkehrsgesellschaft	Stadler RegioShuttle RS1 (650)

=== Lines 9, 90–99 (south) ===
Line	Frequency (in minutes)	Brand/line name	Route	Lines used	KBS	Operator	Rolling stock
RE 9	60	Augsburger Netze Los 1	Munich – Mering – Augsburg – Dinkelscherben – Günzburg – Neu-Ulm – Ulm	Munich–Augsburg; Augsburg–Ulm	980	Arverio Bayern	Siemens Mireo (463) Siemens Desiro HC (462)
RB 92	120	E-Netz Allgäu	Memmingen – Leutkirch – Kißlegg – Wangen – Hergatz – Lindau-Insel	Leutkirch–Memmingen; Kißlegg–Hergatz	753, 971	Arverio Bayern	Stadler Flirt 3 (1428)
RB 93	60		Lindau-Insel – Wasserburg – Friedrichshafen Stadt – Aulendorf – Ulm	Lindau–Friedrichshafen	731	DB Regio Baden-Württemberg	Class 425
RB 94	Some trains		Kempten – Immenstadt – Hergatz	Buchloe–Lindau	970	DB Regio Bayern	Pesa Link (633)
RE 96	120	E-Netz Allgäu	Munich – Buchloe – Türkheim – Mindelheim – Memmingen – Kißlegg – Hergatz – Lindau-Insel – Lindau-Reutin	Munich–Buchloe; Buchloe–Memmingen; Leutkirch–Memmingen; Kißlegg–Hergatz; Buchloe–Lindau	970, 971	Arverio Bayern	Stadler Flirt 3 (1428)

== S-Bahn Lines ==
=== Munich S-Bahn ===
Line	Route	KBS	Frequency	Material	Operator	Image
Munich Airport	Munich Airport/Freising – München Hauptbahnhof – München Ostbahnhof – Leuchtenbergring	999.1	3x per hour	DBAG Class 423	S-Bahn München	
S2 (Munich)	Petershausen/Altomünster – München Hauptbahnhof – München Ostbahnhof – Erding	999.2	3x per hour	DBAG Class 423	S-Bahn München	
S3 (Munich)	Mammendorf – München-Pasing – München Hauptbahnhof – München Ostbahnhof – Holzkirchen	999.3	3x per hour	DBAG Class 423	S-Bahn München	
S4 (Munich)	Geltendorf – München-Pasing – München Hauptbahnhof – München Ostbahnhof – München Trudering – Haar – Ebersberg	999.4	3x per hour	DBAG Class 423	S-Bahn München	
S5 (Munich)	Kreuzstraße – Höhenkirchen-Siegertsbrunn – Ottobrunn – Neuperlach Süd – Giesing – Ostbahnhof – Marienplatz – Pasing (– Neuaubing – Germering-Unterpfaffenhofen – Weßling)		3x per hour	DBAG Class 423	S-Bahn München	
S6 (Munich)	Tutzing – München-Pasing – München Hauptbahnhof – München Ostbahnhof - Ebersberg	999.6	3x per hour	DBAG Class 423	S-Bahn München	
S7 (Munich)	Wolfratshausen – Höllriegelskreuth – Solln – Hauptbahnhof	999.7	3x per hour	DBAG Class 423	S-Bahn München	
Munich Airport	Herrsching – München-Pasing – München Hauptbahnhof – München Ostbahnhof - Munich Airport	999.8	3x per hour	DBAG Class 423	S-Bahn München	
S20 (Munich)	(Geltendorf – Grafrath – Puchheim –) Pasing – Höllriegelskreuth	999.20	Infrequent	DB Class 420	S-Bahn München	

=== Nuremberg S-Bahn ===
Line	Route	KBS	Frequency	Material	Operator	Image
S1	Bamberg – Strullendorf – Hirschaid – Buttenheim – Eggolsheim – Forchheim (Oberfr) – Kersbach – Baiersdorf – Bubenreuth – Erlangen – Erlangen Paul-Gossen-Straße – Erlangen-Bruck – Eltersdorf – Vach – Fürth-Unterfarrnbach – Fürth (Bay) Hauptbahnhof – Nürnberg Rothenburger Straße – Nürnberg-Steinbühl – Nürnberg Hauptbahnhof – Nürnberg-Dürrenhof – Nürnberg Ostring – Nürnberg-Mögeldorf – Nürnberg-Rehhof – Nürnberg-Laufamholz – Schwaig – Röthenbach (Pegnitz) – Röthenbach-Steinberg – Röthenbach-Seespitze – Lauf West – Lauf (links Pegnitz) – Ottensoos – Henfenfeld – Hersbruck (l Pegnitz) – Happurg – Pommelsbrunn – Hartmannshof	890.1	20/40 min	Alstom Coradia Continental	DB Regio Bayern	
S2	Roth – Büchenbach – Rednitzhembach – Schwabach – Schwabach-Limbach – Katzwang – Reichelsdorfer Keller – Nürnberg-Reichelsdorf – Nürnberg-Eibach – Nürnberg-Sandreuth – Nürnberg-Steinbühl – Nürnberg Hauptbahnhof – Nürnberg-Dürrenhof – Nürnberg-Gleißhammer – Nürnberg-Dutzendteich – Nürnberg Frankenstadion – Fischbach (Nürnberg) – Feucht – Feucht-Moosbach – Winkelhaid – Ludersheim – Altdorf West – Altdorf (b Nürnberg)	890.2	20/40 min	Bombardier Talent 2	DB Regio Bayern	
S3	Nürnberg Hauptbahnhof – Feucht – Feucht Ost – Ochenbruck – Mimberg – Burgthann – Oberferrieden – Postbauer-Heng – Pölling – Neumarkt (Oberpf)	890.3	20/40 min	Bombardier Talent 2	DB Regio Bayern	
S4	Nürnberg Hauptbahnhof – Nürnberg-Schweinau – Nürnberg-Stein – Unterasbach – Oberasbach – Anwanden – Roßtal – Roßtal Wegbrücke – Raitersaich – Heilsbronn – Petersaurach Nord – Wicklesgreuth – Sachsen (b Ansbach) – Ansbach – Leutershausen-Wiedersbach – Dombühl – Crailsheim	890.4	20/40 min	Bombardier Talent 2	DB Regio Bayern	
S5	Nürnberg Hauptbahnhof – Allersberg (Rothsee)	900	60 min	Alstom Coradia Continental	DB Regio Bayern	
S6	Nürnberg Hauptbahnhof – Neustadt – Markt Bibart	805	60 min	Bombardier Talent 2	DB Regio Bayern	

=== Danube-Iller Regional S-Bahn ===
Line	Route	KBS	Frequency	Material	Operator
RS 5	Ulm Hauptbahnhof – Thalfingen – Langenau (Württ) – Giengen (Brenz) – Heidenheim – Oberkochen – Aalen	757	60 min	Alstom Coradia LINT (Class 622)	Hohenzollerische Landesbahn
RS 51	Ulm – Thalfingen – Langenau (Württ)	757	60 min	Alstom Coradia LINT (Class 622)	Hohenzollerische Landesbahn
RS 7	Ulm Hauptbahnhof – Neu-Ulm – Finningerstraße (– Gerlenhofen) – Senden – Vöhringen – Bellenberg – Illertissen – Altenstadt (Iller) – Kellmünz – Memmingen	975	60 min	Alstom Coradia LINT (Class 622)	DB Regio Bayern
RS 71	Ulm Hauptbahnhof – Neu-Ulm – Finningerstraße – Senden – Wullenstetten – Witzighausen – Weißenhorn-Eschach – Weißenhorn	975; 976	60 min	Alstom Coradia LINT (Class 622)	DB Regio Bayern

=== Salzburg S-Bahn ===
Line	Route	KBS	Frequency	Material	Operator
	Bad Reichenhall – Freilassing – Salzburg – Schwarzach-St. Veit	954	60 min	Bombardier Talent (4023)	ÖBB
	Berchtesgaden – Bad Reichenhall – Freilassing	954	60 min	Stadler Flirt	Bayerische Regiobahn

=== St. Gallen S-Bahn ===
Line	Route	KBS	Frequency	Material	Operator
S7	Lindau-Insel – Lindau-Reutin – St. Margrethen – Rorschach – Romanshorn – Weinfelden	5420	360 min (Mo-Fr) 120 min (Sa-So)	Stadler Flirt	ÖBB / THURBO

=== Tyrol S-Bahn ===
Line	Route	KBS	Frequency	Material	Operator
S6	Garmisch-Partenkirchen – Scharnitz – Innsbruck	960	240 min	Bombardier Talent (4023)	ÖBB
S7	Pfronten-Steinach – Reutte – Zugspitzbahn – Garmisch-Partenkirchen	965	60 min	Bombardier Talent 2 (2442)	DB Regio Bayern

=== Vorarlberg S-Bahn ===
Line	Route	KBS	Frequency	Material	Operator
S1	Lindau-Insel – Lindau-Reutin – Bregenz – Dornbirn – Feldkirch – Bludenz	5420	120 min	Bombardier Talent (4023)	ÖBB

== See also ==
- List of scheduled railway routes in Germany
