= Teisendorf station =

Railway station in Germany

Teisendorf
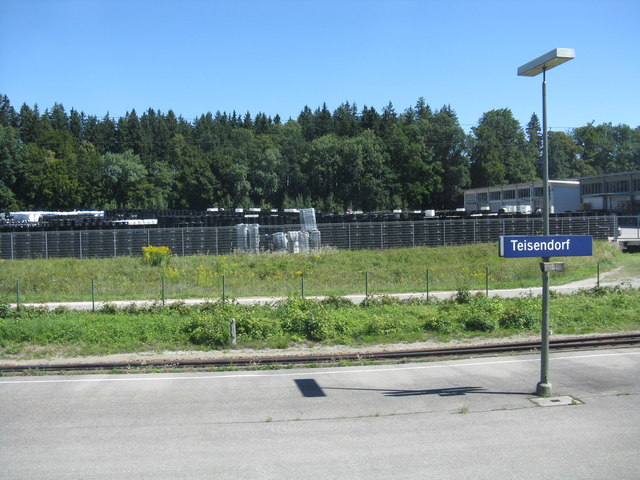
- 2012

General information
- Location: Bahnhofplatz 1; 83317 Teisendorf; Bavaria; Germany
- Coordinates: 47.8493°N 12.8342°E
- System: Bf
- Owner: Deutsche Bahn
- Operator: DB Netz; DB Station&Service
- Line: Rosenheim–Salzburg railway
- Platforms: 1 island platform
- Tracks: 3
- Train operators: Bayerische Regiobahn

Other information
- Station code: 6162
- DS100 code: MTO
- IBNR: 8005833
- Category: 5
- Website: www.bahnhof.de

Services
Preceding station		Following station
Traunstein towards München Hbf	RE 5	Freilassing towards Salzburg Hbf
Location
- Location within Bavaria Location within Germany Location within Europe

Teisendorf station is a railway station in the municipality of Teisendorf, located in the Berchtesgadener Land district in Bavaria, Germany.
