= Bad Reichenhall station =

Railway station in Bad Reichenhall, Germany

Bad Reichenhall
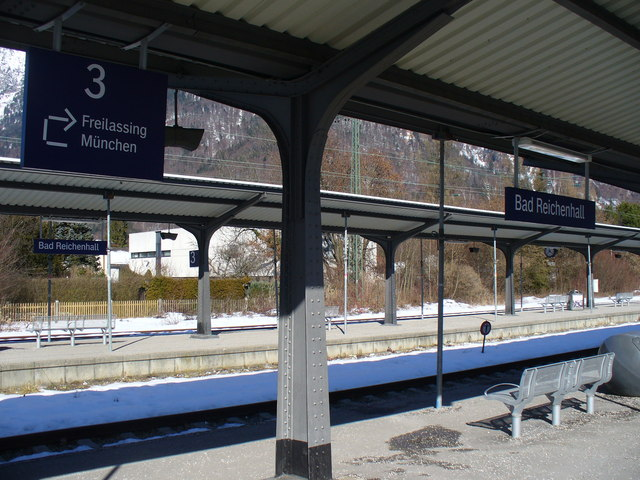
- 2010

General information
- Location: Bahnhofplatz 1; 83435 Bad Reichenhall; Bavaria; Germany
- Coordinates: 47.7310°N 12.8821°E
- Elevation: 466 m (1,529 ft)
- System: Bf
- Owner: Deutsche Bahn
- Operator: DB Netz; DB Station&Service
- Lines: Freilassing–Berchtesgaden railway (KBS 954)
- Platforms: 2 side platforms
- Tracks: 3
- Train operators: Bayerische Oberlandbahn; Österreichische Bundesbahn

Construction
- Parking: yes
- Cycle facilities: yes
- Accessible: yes

Other information
- Station code: 321
- DS100 code: MBRL
- IBNR: 8000737
- Category: 5
- Website: www.bahnhof.de

History
- Opened: 1 July 1866; 160 years ago
- Electrified: 1 August 1916; 110 years ago

Services
Preceding station	Salzburg S-Bahn	Following station
Bad Reichenhall-Kirchberg towards Berchtesgaden Hbf	S4	Piding towards Freilassing
Terminus	S3	Piding towards Saalfelden
Location
- Location within Bavaria Location within Germany Location within Europe

Bad Reichenhall station (German: Bahnhof Bad Reichenhall) is a railway station in the municipality of Bad Reichenhall, located in the Berchtesgadener Land district in Bavaria, Germany.
