= Traunstein station =

Railway station in Traunstein, Germany

Traunstein
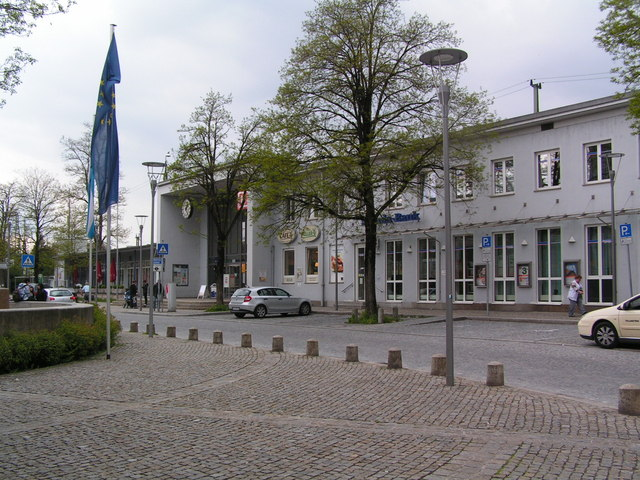
- Street view of the station building

General information
- Location: Bahnhofplatz 5, Traunstein, Bavaria; Germany
- Coordinates: 47°52′10″N 12°38′19″E
- Owner: Deutsche Bahn
- Operator: DB Netz; DB Station&Service
- Lines: Rosenheim–Salzburg (KBS 951); Traunstein–Ruhpolding (KBS 953); Traunstein–Waging (KBS 959); Traunstein–Traunreut/Trostberg (KBS 947)
- Platforms: 4 long distance; 2 bay

Construction
- Accessible: Yes

Other information
- Station code: 6240
- DS100 code: MTS
- IBNR: 8000116
- Category: 3
- Website: stationsdatenbank.de; www.bahnhof.de

History
- Opened: 7 May 1860; 166 years ago
- Electrified: 27 March 1928; 98 years ago

Services
Preceding station	DB Fernverkehr	Following station
Prien am Chiemsee towards Frankfurt (Main) Hbf or Münster Hbf	ICE 62	Freilassing towards Graz Hbf
Prien am Chiemsee towards München Hbf	EC 62	Freilassing towards Salzburg Hbf or Vienna Airport
Preceding station		Following station
Bergen (Oberbayern) towards München Hbf	RE 5	Teisendorf towards Salzburg Hbf
Terminus	RB 53	Seiboldsdorf towards Ruhpolding
Preceding station		Following station
Traunstein Klinikum towards Mühldorf (Oberbay)	RB 47	Terminus
Traunstein Klinikum towards Traunreut	RB 49	Terminus
Terminus	RB 59	Hufschlag towards Waging
Location

Traunstein station is the only station of the large district town of Traunstein in the German state of Bavaria. It has four main line platform tracks and two bay platform tracks and is classified by Deutsche Bahn as a category 4 station. The station is a rail junction and is located on the Rosenheim–Salzburg, Traunstein–Ruhpolding, Traunstein–Waging and Traunstein–Garching lines.

== Location ==
The station is located in the centre of the town of Traunstein. Southeast of the station is the Bahnhofsplatz (station forecourt), which the station building faces. The station building has the address of Bahnhofsplatz 5. To the north Wasserburgerstraße passes under the railway tracks. Güterhallenstraße ("freight hall street") runs northeast of the railway precinct.

== History ==
The station was opened on 7 May 1860 with the completion of the Rosenheim–Traunstein line. It was established as a centre for rail and postal traffic. On 1 August 1860, the line was completed to Salzburg. The station initially had four tracks, loading tracks with a loading shed and a loading dock and a turntable. The line had five turnout guard posts. Opposite the station there was the watering point to supply the engines with water. The station building was a two storey brick building, which had three apartments for the station master, the track master (Bahnmeister) and the operations inspector. On the side of the building on the ground floor there were numerous extensions. In front of the ticket office there were extensions to the left and the right, which housed a waiting room, the station master’s office and the post office. The main building housed another waiting room and luggage handling. In 1888, the tracks of the station were rebuilt as a result of the increasing volume of traffic on the Munich–Salzburg railway. On 7 September 1891, the station was rebuilt again for the opening of the Traun-Alz Railway (Traunstein–Garching railway). In addition, a roundhouse was installed in the station. In 1892, construction began on a new, southwestern extension of the station building, which was completed in 1894. In 1895, the branch line was completed to Ruhpolding, which had to be connected for topographical reasons to platform 1. As platform 1 was (and continues to be) also used for long-distance trains, platform 1a was established at the beginning of the branch line but connected to platform 1. In 1894, work started in Traunstein to duplicate the Munich–Rosenheim line. The upgrade of Traunstein station was completed in 1896. After the completion of this work, the station had four through platform tracks, a bay platform—where trains to and from Trostberg could reverse—and four sidings in the rear for parking. A new freight shed was built with an independent loading track. During the renovation of the station, a centralised interlocking panel for controlling the signalling was installed and two new signal boxes were built for guarding points. A pedestrian bridge was built in 1899. The branch line was opened to Waging on 1 December 1902. Therefore, another bay platform and extra storage tracks were built. The office for managing rail operations in Traunstein was dissolved on 1 February 1911. On 20 April 1928, electrification of the railway station was completed; it involved replacing the pedestrian bridge with an underpass. From 1927 to 1928 new buildings were built for the railway and the office of the catenary supervisor (Fahrleitungsmeisterei). A new carriage shed for electric multiple units was also built.

The station buildings were completely destroyed on 18 and 25 April 1945 during aerial bombardment in the closing stages of the Second World War. Over 100 civilians, many of which had taken shelter in a nearby underpass, were killed.

=== Reconstruction and operation today ===
To replace the destroyed interlocking panel in the station building, the second signal box for guarding points was converted to house an interlocking panel. The station building was replaced by a wooden shed. Planning for a new station began in 1952. The planned building was similar to the station building in Bad Reichenhall. The following facilities were planned: an operations room, a luggage hall, a ticket office, a lobby, lavatories, a station restaurant and upstairs apartments for railway employees. The side of the building next to the station forecourt was glazed and connected by stairs to the forecourt. The cost of the building was 740,000 Deutsche Mark, with DM 160,000 provided by Deutsche Bundesbahn and DM 580,000 provided by the state of Bavaria. The electrification of the Traunstei–Ruhpolding line was completed on 3 November 1955. The Ruhpolding locomotive depot was moved to Traunstein. A new track plan interlocking of class SpDrS60 was put into operation on 14 July 1964. The signal box was built to the west of the station building. On 26 September 1976, Traunstein, became a node for freight operations, but this was discontinued on 1 June 1983. The roundhouse was demolished in the 1980s. Since 1986, signalling at Übersee station has been remotely controlled by the dispatcher in Traunstein. Local freight operations in Traunstein were abandoned on 29 October 1997. The station building was renovated for 800,000 DM in 1997. Today, the building houses a bank branch and a travel centre. In 2016, the station was made barrier-free.

== Platforms ==
The track and platform area was significantly rebuilt in 2016. Thus, all tracks were dismantled from track 1b and southeast of it. Also, the former engine shed and the building of the supervisor of track maintenance (Bahnmeisterei) were removed. The platform on track 2 no longer exists. All stopping passenger trains towards Salzburg now run on track 1. Track 2 is now used exclusively as a passing and overtaking track. In the course of these reconstruction measures, the platform height on track 1 was significantly increased. This had already happened a few years ago in the area of tracks 3, 4 and 5. Instead of tracks and buildings in the southeastern area of the station there is now a parking lot.

Platform lengths and heights are as follows:

- Track 1: length 315 m, height 76 cm
- Track 1a: length 143 m, height 55 cm
- Track 3: length 323 m, height 76 cm
- Track 4: length 115 m, height 55 cm
- Track 5: length 323 m, height 55 cm

== Rail services ==
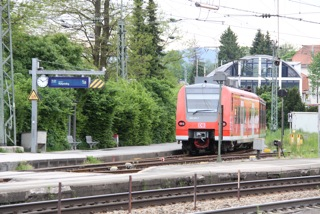
Class 425 EMU on platform 1a running towards Ruhpolding

The station is located between the larger stations of Rosenheim and Salzburg and is served by InterCity services. Austrian “corridor” trains (which run between Salzburg and Innsbruck through Germany without stopping) and Railjet services run through without stopping in Traunstein.

=== Long distance services ===
Traunstein station is served by InterCity and EuroCity trains between Munich and Austria. In the 2026 timetable, the following services stopped at the station:

Line	Route		Frequency	Operator
ICE 62	Frankfurt – Darmstadt – Heidelberg –	Stuttgart – Ulm – Augsburg – Munich – Rosenheim – Rosenheim – Traunstein – Salzburg – Villach – Klagenfurt – Graz	2 train pairs	DB Fernverkehr
ICE 62	Münster – Essen – Düsseldorf – Köln Messe/Deutz – Frankfurt Airport – Mannheim –	Stuttgart – Ulm – Augsburg – Munich – Rosenheim – Rosenheim – Traunstein – Salzburg – Villach – Klagenfurt – Graz	One train pair	DB Fernverkehr
EC/RJ 62	Munich – Rosenheim – Rosenheim – Traunstein – Salzburg (– Villach – Klagenfurt – Graz – Vienna – Vienna Airport)		2 train pairs to Salzburg, 1 train pair to Vienna	ÖBB
RE 5	Munich – Rosenheim – Prien am Chiemsee – Traunstein – Freilassing – Salzburg		Hourly	Bayerische Regiobahn
RB 47	Mühldorf – Garching (Alz) – Trostberg – Hörpolding – Traunstein		Some trains	Südostbayernbahn
RB 49	Traunstein – Hörpolding – Traunreut		Hourly	Südostbayernbahn
RB 53	Traunstein – Ruhpolding		Hourly	Bayerische Regiobahn
RB 59	Traunstein – Waging		Hourly (every 2 hours on weekends)	Südostbayernbahn

== Future ==
A connection to the network of the Salzburg S-Bahn is planned, but there are still no concrete plans.
