= Nürnberg-Reichelsdorf station =

Railway station in Nuremberg, Germany

Nürnberg-Reichelsdorf
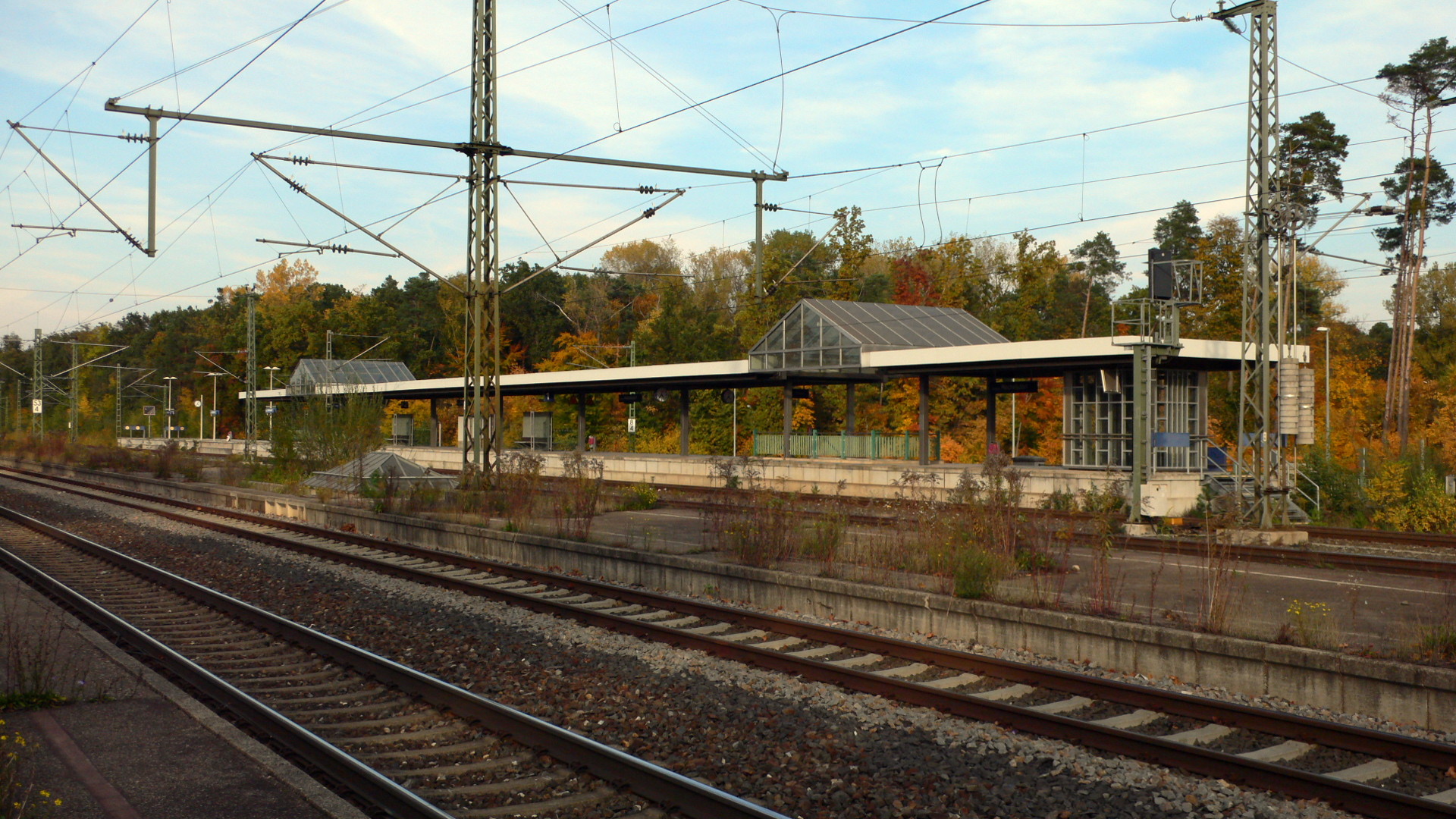
- The station in 2008

General information
- Location: Waldstromerstr. 70; Nuremberg, Bavaria; Germany
- Coordinates: 49°22′56″N 11°02′20″E
- Owner: DB Netz
- Operator: DB Station&Service
- Line: Nuremberg–Roth line
- Distance: 8.4 km (5.2 mi) from Nürnberg Hauptbahnhof
- Platforms: 1 island platform
- Tracks: 2
- Train operators: DB Regio Bayern

Other information
- Station code: 4608
- DS100 code: NNRE
- IBNR: 8004483
- Category: 5
- Fare zone: VGN: 200 and 601
- Website: bahnhof.de

History
- Opened: 1 April 1849; 177 years ago
- Electrified: 10 May 1935; 91 years ago
Location

Nürnberg-Reichelsdorf station is a railway station in Nuremberg, Bavaria, Germany. The station is on the Nuremberg–Roth line of Deutsche Bahn. It is served by Nuremberg S-Bahn line S2.

== History ==
The station first opened on 1 April 1849. It was rebuilt in 2001 to serve the Nuremberg S-Bahn.
