= Berchtesgaden Hauptbahnhof =

Railway station in Berchtesgaden, Germany

Berchtesgaden Hbf
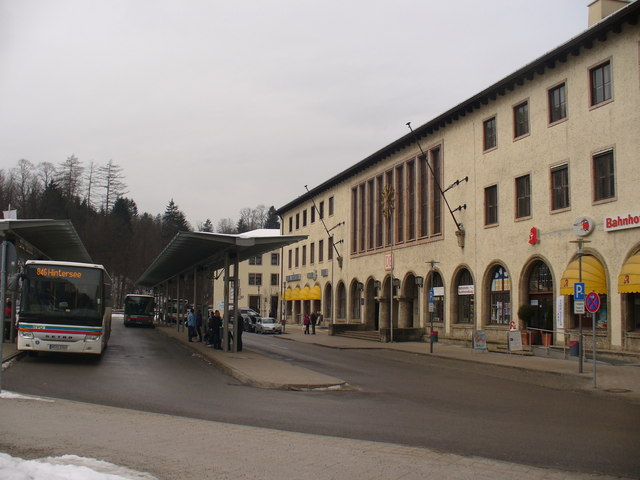
- View of the station building from the forecourt

General information
- Location: Bahnhofplatz 2, Berchtesgaden, Bavaria; Germany
- Coordinates: 47°37′35″N 12°59′57″E
- Elevation: 540 m (1,770 ft)
- Owner: Deutsche Bahn
- Operator: DB Station&Service
- Lines: Freilassing–Berchtesgaden railway (KBS 954); Berchtesgaden–Königssee (Königsseer Bf; closed); Berchtesgaden–Hangender Stein (closed)
- Platforms: 4
- Train operators: DB Fernverkehr; Berchtesgadener Land Bahn

Construction
- Accessible: Yes

Other information
- Station code: 0495
- DS100 code: MBG
- IBNR: 8000885
- Category: 5
- Website: stationsdatenbank.de; www.bahnhof.de

History
- Opened: 25 October 1888; 137 years ago
- Electrified: 15 January 1908; 118 years ago

Services
Preceding station	Salzburg S-Bahn	Following station
Bischofswiesen towards Freilassing	S4	Terminus
Location
- Location within Bavaria Location within Germany Location within Europe

Berchtesgaden Hauptbahnhof (German for Berchtesgaden main station; sometimes translated as "Central Station") is a railway station in the Bavarian market town of Berchtesgaden, the smallest town in Germany with a Hauptbahnhof. It has five platform tracks and is classified by Deutsche Bahn as a category 5 station. It is the terminus of the Freilassing–Berchtesgaden railway. Previously the Berchtesgaden–Hangender Stein railway, also called the Grüne Elektrische ("Green Electric") started from the station. Within walking distance of the station (Triftplatz) was the former station (Königsseer Bf) of Königssee Railway (German: Königsseebahn), which served the lake of Königssee. The station is served by about 20 trains daily operated by Deutsche Bahn and the Berchtesgadener Land Bahn.

== Location ==
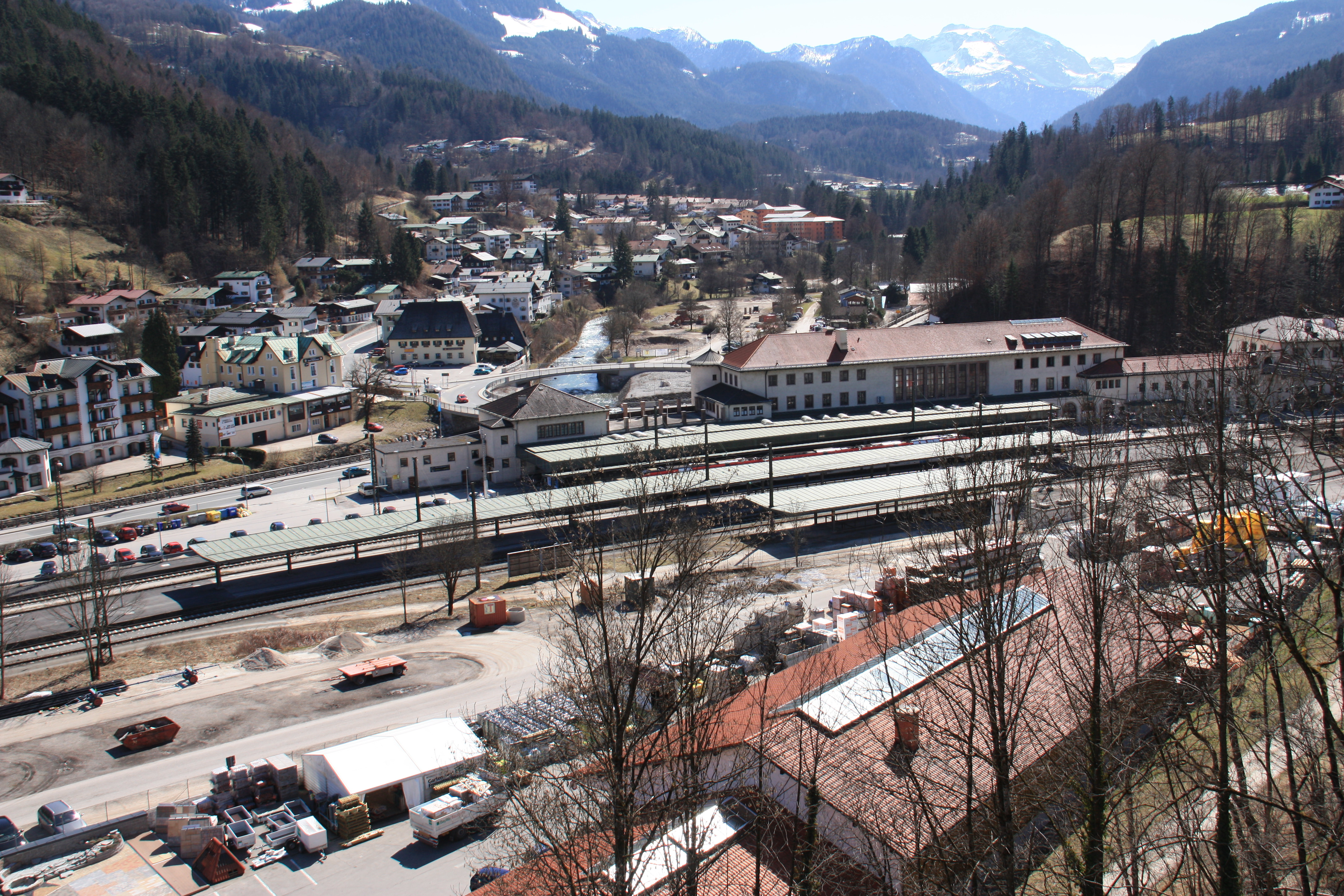
Aerial view of the station

The station is located in the southwest of the historic market centre of Berchtesgaden in the valley of the Ramsauer Ache on Federal Highway 305. It is bounded to the south by Ramsauerstraße and Bahnhofsvorplatz (the station forecourt). To the east is Bahnhofstraße (station street), which runs next to the station facilities, and to the west of the station there is a street called Am Güterbahnhof ("at the freight yard").

== History ==
On 29 May 1886, the Bavarian parliament approved the construction of the Freilassing–Berchtesgaden railway. Berchtesgaden station was built next to the Fraureuth salt works. On 25 October 1888, the railway was officially opened from Freilassing. The station had three tracks at its opening, with a platform on one of them. The other two tracks were freight loading tracks. It also had a roundhouse and a three-storey station building, which still exists. The Berchtesgaden municipality was not satisfied with the station because it was not suitable for mass travel. Construction of a line towards Salzburg started in 1906. The new line was electrified from the beginning and the station was equipped with an overhead line. A railcar shed was also built at the station. The line was opened to Schellenberg on 16 July 1907. It was extended to Hangender Stein on 15 January 1908 and it was completed to Salzburg on 4 June 1909, creating a second through line to the station. During this period, the construction of an additional line to the Königssee had begun. A separate station was built for this line and there was only a connecting track between the two stations. The track was opened on 29 May 1909. The station was declared to be a Hauptbahnhof in 1913. Electrification was completed between Berchtesgaden and Bad Reichenhall on 7 August 1916. Three tracks were created in Bischofswiesen to relieve Berchtesgaden station; there was not enough money for the upgrading of Berchtesgaden station. Nevertheless, another platform track was built in Berchtesgaden in 1932. It also received a station underpass between the platform and the freight shed, which was built on the site of the old salt works. Due to the many state visits to Berchtesgaden, the Deutsche Reichsbahn was forced to open a new station building and rebuild the station. Construction began in 1938. On 2 October 1938, the local service was closed to Salzburg so that this line could be rebuilt with double track, but this project was abandoned after the Second World War.

After the reconstruction of the station, it had four platform tracks, two of which were on an island platform and the other two had side platforms. Only a few facilities were built for freight as a separate freight yard would be built at Berchtesgaden Nord (north). The new station building was built in the style of the Nazi era and opened on 1 February 1940. The large frescoes on the east and west side inside the concourse by Maria Harrich were not created until the early 1950s. A new mechanical interlocking was opened in an extension of the station building. After an air raid on Bad Reichenhall on 25 April 1945, trains were suspended until the summer of 1945.

The service on the Königssee Railway ended on 2 October 1965 and the line was officially closed on 1 April 1971.

== Infrastructure ==
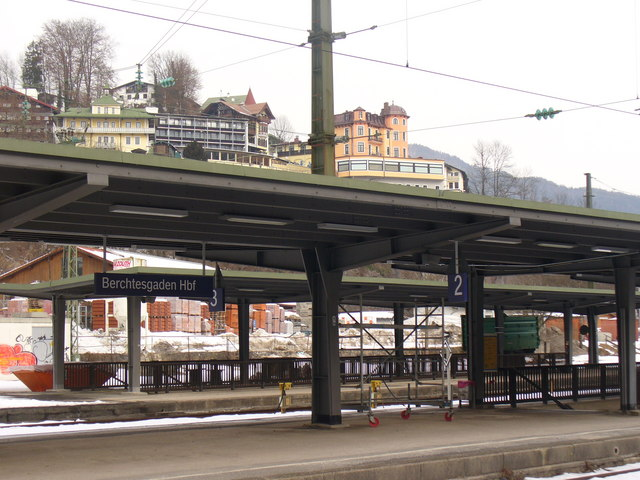
Station platforms

The station has four platform tracks, which are connected by a subway platform to platform 1, next to the station building. The station is not adapted for the disabled, but it has electronic platform displays. In the station forecourt there is a bus station.

=== Platform data ===
Platform lengths and heights are as follows:

- Track 1: height 38 cm, length 237 m
- Track 2: height 38 cm, length 245 m
- Track 3: height 38 cm, length 245 m
- Track 4: height 38 cm, length 245 m

== Rail services ==
The station is served by hourly trains of the Berchtesgadener Land Bahn on the Berchtesgaden–Freilassing route; these operate as line 4 of the Salzburg S-Bahn. An Intercity pair of trains, the Königssee ran from Hamburg to Berchtesgaden and back once a day until October 2025; it was designated as a Regional-Express from Freilassing.

Train class	Route	Frequency
	Freilassing – Bad Reichenhall – Berchtesgaden	Hourly
