= Biessenhofen–Füssen railway =

Railway line in Bavaria, Germany

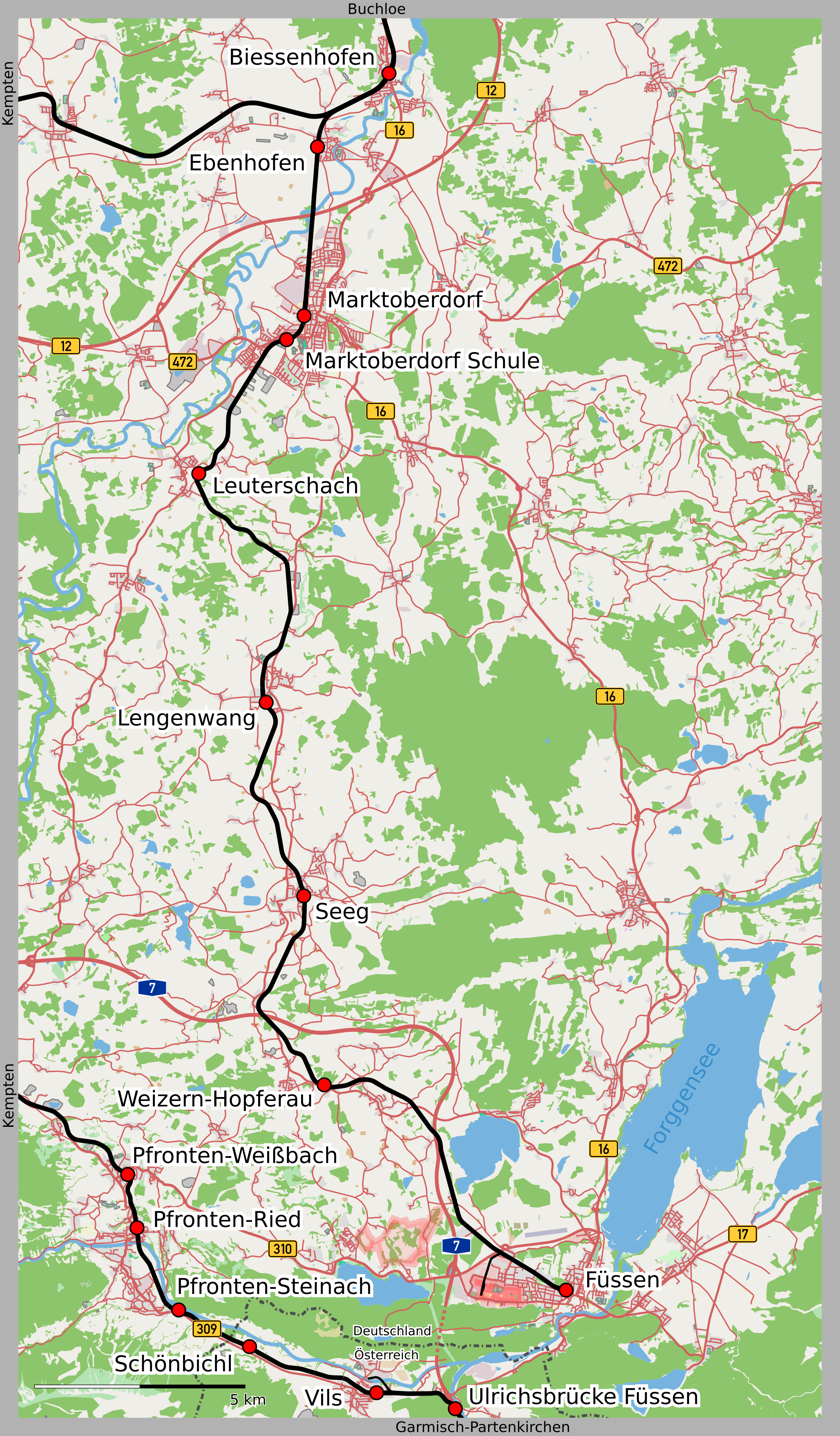

Overview
- Line number: 5440 Biessenhofen–Marktoberdorf; 5441 Marktoberdorf–Füssen
- Locale: Bavaria, Germany

Service
- Route number: 974 (Buchloe–Füssen)

Technical
- Line length: 37.133 km (23.073 mi)
- Track gauge: 1,435 mm (4 ft 8 1/2 in) standard gauge
- Operating speed: 80 km/h (50 mph) (maximum)

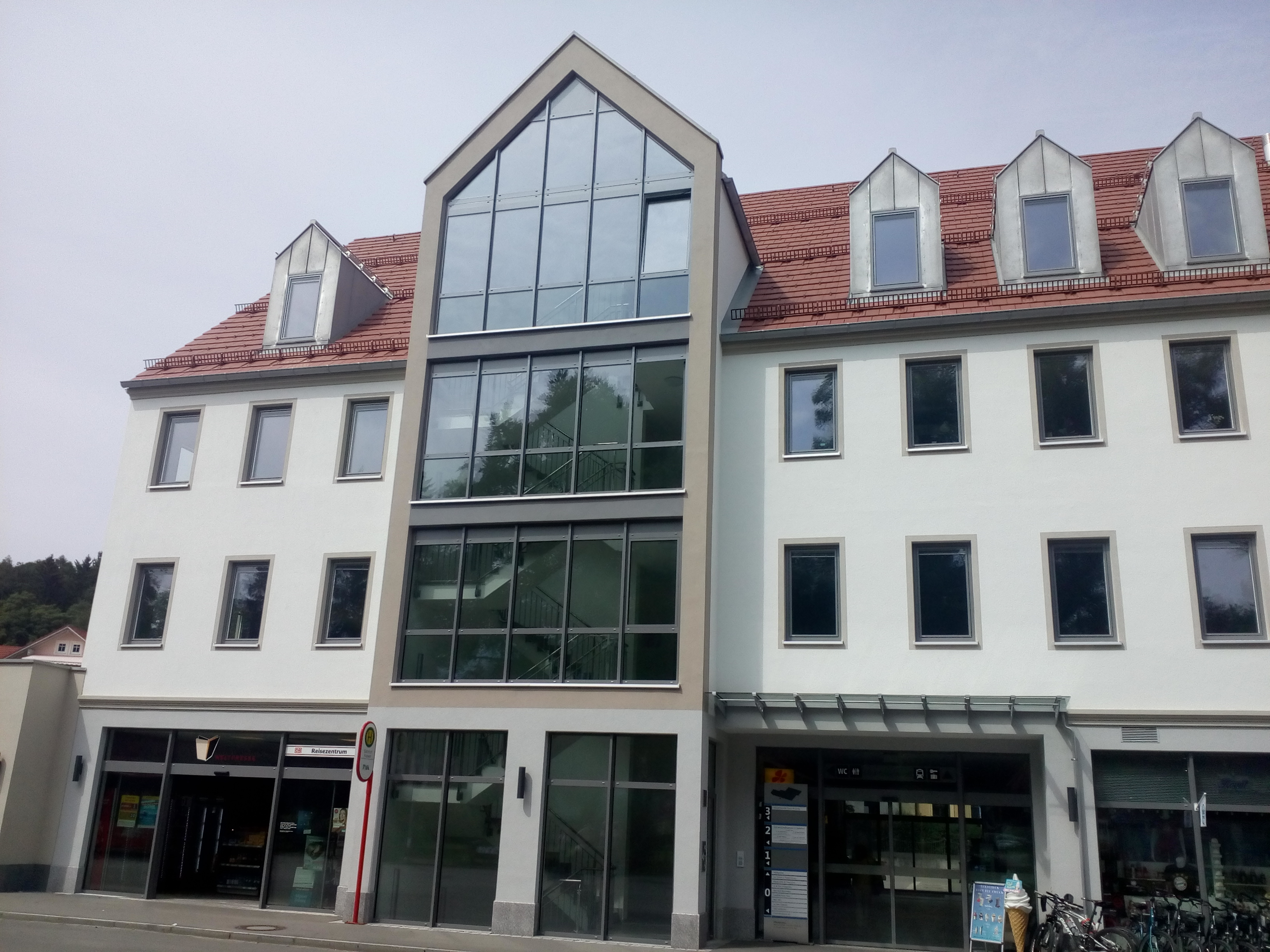
Füssen station at the end of the line

The Biessenhofen–Füssen railway is a single-track and non-electrified branch line in the German state of Bavaria and it is a branch line connecting Füssen with the village of Biessenhofen on the Buchloe–Lindau railway. The Biessenhofen–Marktoberdorf section was opened in 1876 by the Royal Bavarian State Railways. On 1 June 1889, the extension to Füssen was opened, but it was built and operated by the private Lokalbahn AG (LAG). After its bankruptcy, the Marktoberdorf–Füssen section was nationalised on 1 August 1938. Until the end of 2018, the track was operated by Deutsche Bahn and also known by the name König-Ludwig-Bahn ("King Ludwig Railway"). Since then, it has been operated by the private operator Bayerische Regiobahn.

== Transport ==
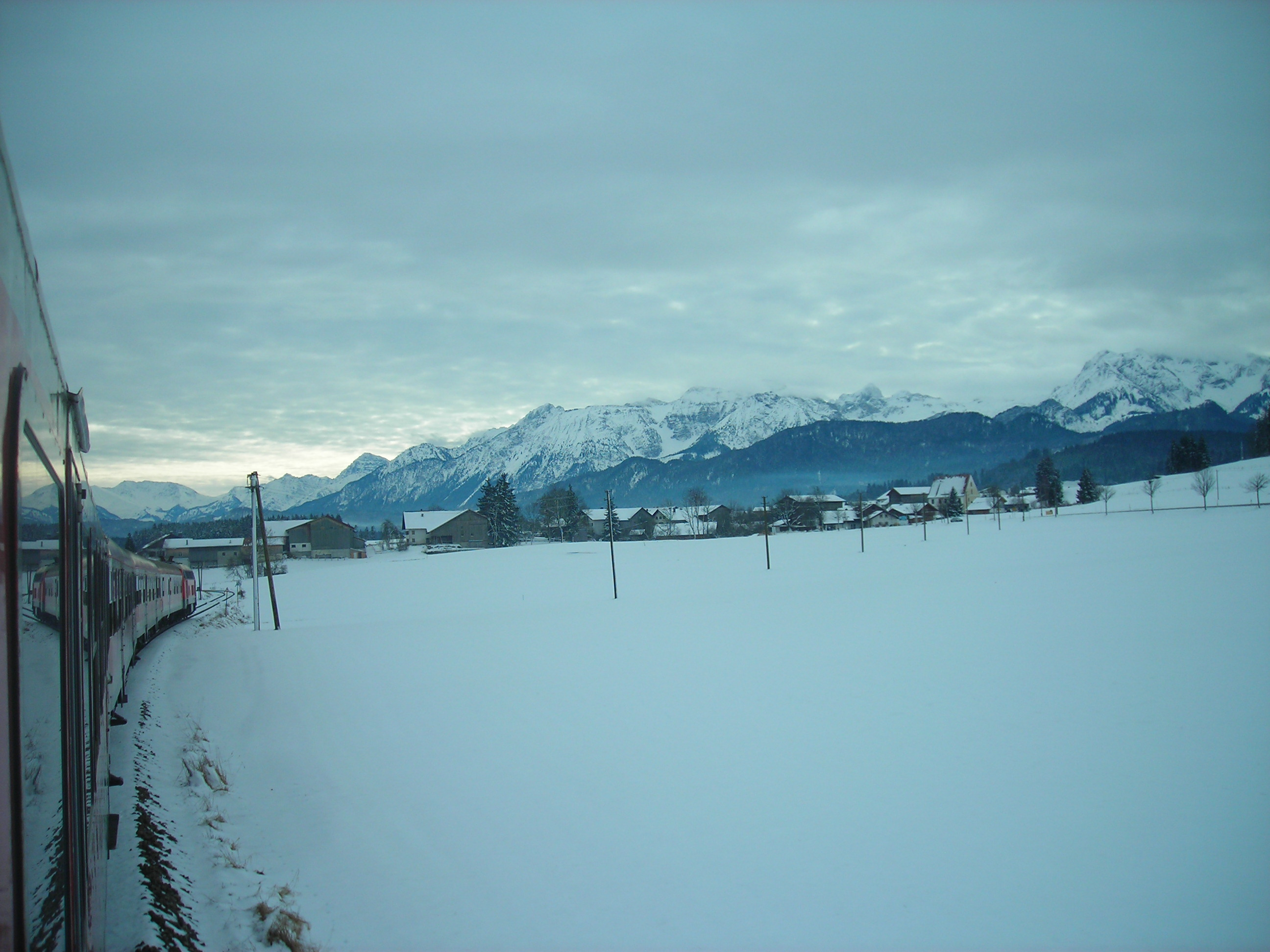
Push–pull train on the line in 2012.

The line is served hourly by Regionalbahn services on the Augsburg–Füssen route (RB77). The Munich–Füssen route (RB 68) is also served by three train pairs a day. These are operated by Bayerische Regiobahn with Alstom Coradia LINT diesel multiple units.

There is a bus connection from Füssen station to Neuschwanstein chateau.
