= Freilassing station =

Railway station in Freilassing, Germany

Freilassing
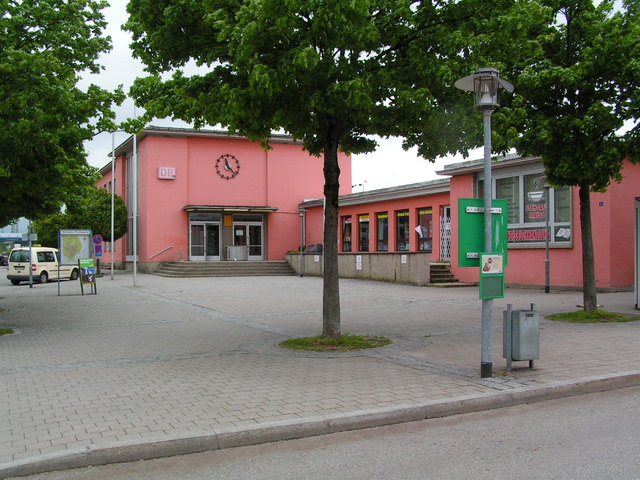
- View from the forecourt to the station building

General information
- Location: Bahnhofstr. 4, Freilassing, Bavaria; Germany
- Coordinates: 47°50′14″N 12°58′38″E
- Elevation: 421 m (1,381 ft)
- Owner: Deutsche Bahn
- Operator: DB Netz; DB Station&Service
- Lines: Rosenheim–Salzburg (KBS 951); Salzburg–Berchtesgaden (KBS 954); Salzburg–Mühldorf (KBS 945)
- Platforms: 7 (1–5,7–8)

Construction
- Accessible: Yes

Other information
- Station code: 1906
- DS100 code: MFL
- IBNR: 8000108
- Category: 3
- Website: stationsdatenbank.de; www.bahnhof.de

History
- Opened: 1 August 1860; 166 years ago
- Electrified: 1 August 1916; 110 years ago
Services
Preceding station	DB Fernverkehr	Following station
Traunstein towards Frankfurt (Main) Hbf or Münster Hbf	ICE 62	Salzburg Hbf towards Graz Hbf
Traunstein towards München Hbf	EC 62	Salzburg Hbf towards Salzburg Hbf or Vienna Airport
Preceding station		Following station
Laufen (Oberbay) towards Landshut (Bayern) Hbf	RB 45	Salzburg Taxham Europark towards Salzburg Hbf
Preceding station		Following station
Teisendorf towards München Hbf	RE 5	Salzburg Hbf Terminus
Preceding station	Salzburg S-Bahn	Following station
Terminus	S2	Salzburg-Liefering towards Straßwalchen
Freilassing-Hofham towards Bad Reichenhall	S3	Salzburg-Liefering towards Saalfelden
Freilassing-Hofham towards Berchtesgaden	S4	Terminus
Location
- Location within Bavaria Location within Germany Location within Europe

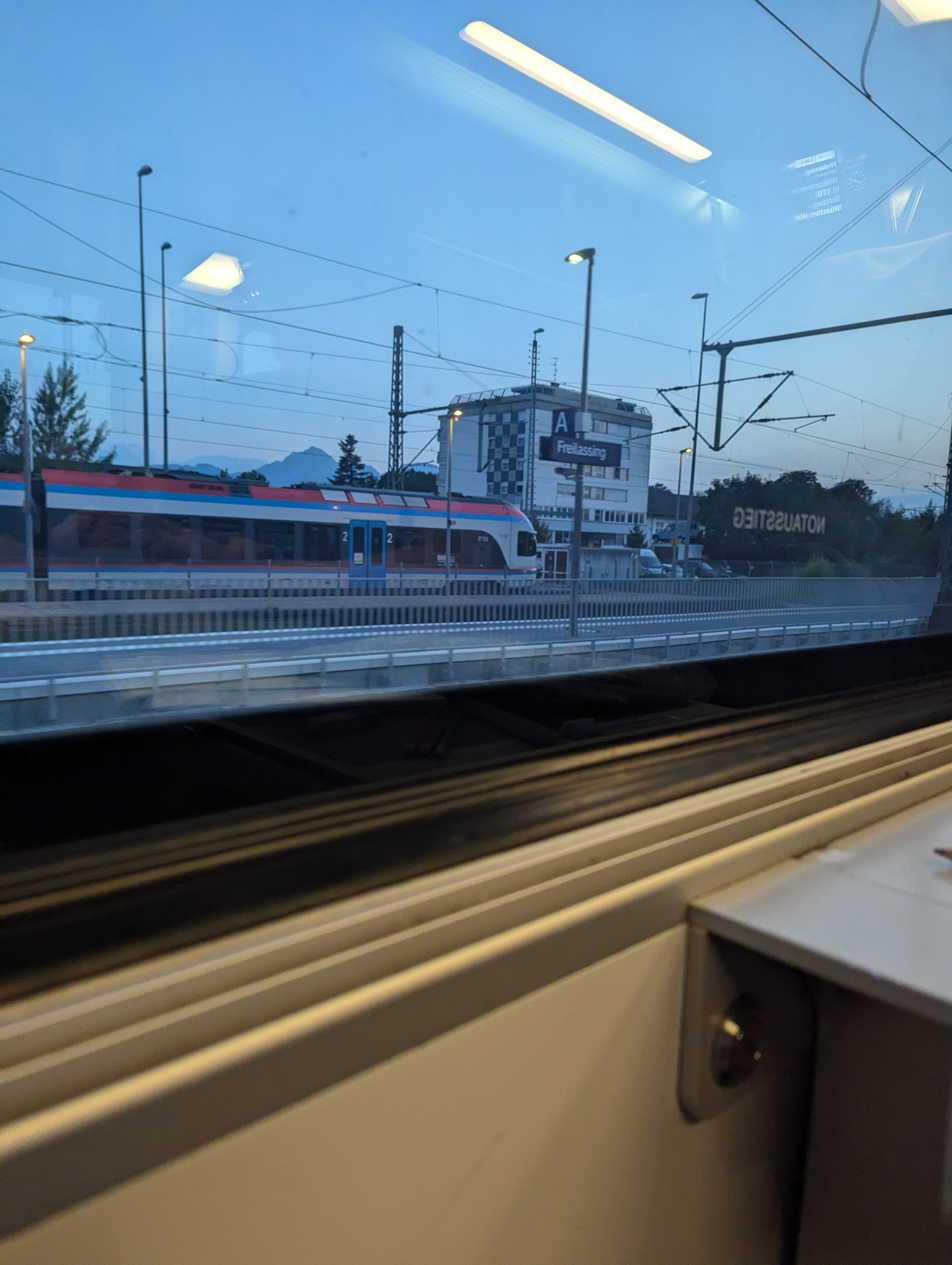
Freilassing

Freilassing station is located in the Upper Bavarian district of Berchtesgaden. It is the last German station on the railway line from Munich to Salzburg, a border station to Austria and the only station in the town of Freilassing.

The station is the junction between the Rosenheim–Salzburg, Salzburg–Berchtesgaden and Salzburg–Mühldorf lines and is used daily by about 160 trains operated by Deutsche Bahn, the Austrian Federal Railways and the Berchtesgadener Land Bahn.

== Location ==
The station is located north of the town centre. The station area is bounded to the north by Rupertusstraße and to the south by Bahnhofstrasse (station street). To the west there is a footbridge linking Bahnhofstrasse and Rupertusstraße. The station building is located south of the railway facilities and has the address of Bahnhofstrasse 4

== History ==
Freilassing station was opened in 1860 together with the railway line from Munich to Salzburg. It then served as a border station between Austria and Bavaria. In 1866, Freilassing was connected to another line (Freilassing–Bad Reichenhall) and in 1888 it was extended to Berchtesgaden. A branch line (Lokalbahn) was opened to Laufen in 1890 and it was extended to Tittmoning in 1894. In 1916, electrification was completed on the Freilassing-Berchtesgaden line.

With the entry of Austria in the European Union in 1995, the station lost its importance as a border station.

=== Freilassing locomotive depot ===
With the opening of lines to Tittmoning and Berchtesgaden and the general increase in traffic, a locomotive depot (Bahnbetriebswerk) was required. This was built from 1902 to 1905 in the northwest of the station area. It had twenty roads and a turntable that was enlarged in 1924 to a length of 23 metres. In 1994, the depot was closed. In 1998, the training workshop was closed. The building has been classified as a historical monument since 1998 and it now houses a railway museum.

== Infrastructure ==
The station has seven through tracks on four platforms, with track 1 as the “home” platform (Hausbahnsteig), that is next to the station building. Each platform is covered and has digital platform displays. All platforms are connected by a pedestrian tunnel to the home platform. Since 2025, there has been step-free access to the platform via lifts. The station building, which remains open to the public, houses a travel center. Opposite the station building, there are 15 additional sidings for freight traffic and for parking passenger trains. The station building has among other things a ticket office. Park and ride parking and bike racks are available in the station area.

The station has been located in the area administered by the Salzburg Transport Association (Salzburger Verkehrsverbund) since 2006 and is served by the Salzburg S-Bahn network. The municipal bus company (Freilassinger StadtBus) operates bus routes 81 and 82 through the Freilassing urban area, connecting with the station. In addition to the local services, Freilassing station is connected by bus route 24 via the stops of Salzburger Platz and Rupertikirche/Rathaus to the public bus network of the city of Salzburg.

=== Platform data ===
Since 2017, the station has had an additional island platform with stub tracks 96/97 for the S-Bahn trains of the S2/S3 lines terminating/originating in Freilassing. Platform lengths and heights are as follows:

- Track 1: length 435 m, height 55 cm
- Track 2: length 381 m, height 55 cm
- Track 3: length 381 m, height 76 cm
- Track 4: length 381 m, height 76 cm
- Track 5: length 381 m, height 76 cm
- Track 7: length 268 m, height 55 cm
- Track 8: length 268 m, height 55 cm
- Track 96: length 268 m, height 55 cm
- Track 97: length 268 m, height 55 cm

=== Rail services ===
Freilassing station is served by Inter City Express and EuroCity services operated by Deutsche Bahn, in cooperation with the Austrian Federal Railways. It is also served by local trains operated by Meridian (a subsidiary of Bayerische Oberlandbahn) to Munich, Salzburg and Rosenheim and by Südostbayernbahn to Mühldorf. The local trains on the line to Berchtesgaden are operated by Berchtesgadener Land Bahn (as line S 4 of the Salzburg S-Bahn) and by the Salzburg S-Bahn (as line S 3, which also continues to Salzburg Central Station in Austria). In the 2026 timetable, the following services stopped at the station:

Line	Route		Frequency
ICE 62	Frankfurt – Darmstadt – Heidelberg –	Stuttgart – Ulm – Augsburg – Munich – Rosenheim – Rosenheim – Prien – Freilassing – Salzburg – Villach – Klagenfurt – Graz	2 train pairs
ICE 62	Münster – Essen – Düsseldorf – Köln Messe/Deutz – Frankfurt Airport – Mannheim –	Stuttgart – Ulm – Augsburg – Munich – Rosenheim – Rosenheim – Prien – Freilassing – Salzburg – Villach – Klagenfurt – Graz	One train pair
EC/RJ 62	Munich – Rosenheim – Rosenheim – Prien – Freilassing – Traunstein – Salzburg (– Villach – Klagenfurt – Graz – Vienna – Vienna Airport)		2 train pairs to Salzburg, 1 train pair to Vienna
RB 45	(Landshut – Vilsbiburg – Neumarkt St-Veit –) Mühldorf – Freilassing – Salzburg		Hourly
RE 5	Munich – Rosenheim – Traunstein – Freilassing		Hourly
	Freilassing – Bad Reichenhall – Berchtesgaden		Hourly
	(Bad Reichenhall – Piding –) Freilassing – Salzburg – Hallein – Golling-Abtenau (– Schwarzach St. Veit – Saalfelden)		Hourly (Mon–Sat: half-hourly)
/R/REX	Linz – Wels – Straßwalchen – Seekirchen – Salzburg – Freilassing		Hourly
REX	Braunau – Mattighofen – Friedburg – Straßwalchen West – Salzburg – Freilassing		Hourly

== Gallery ==
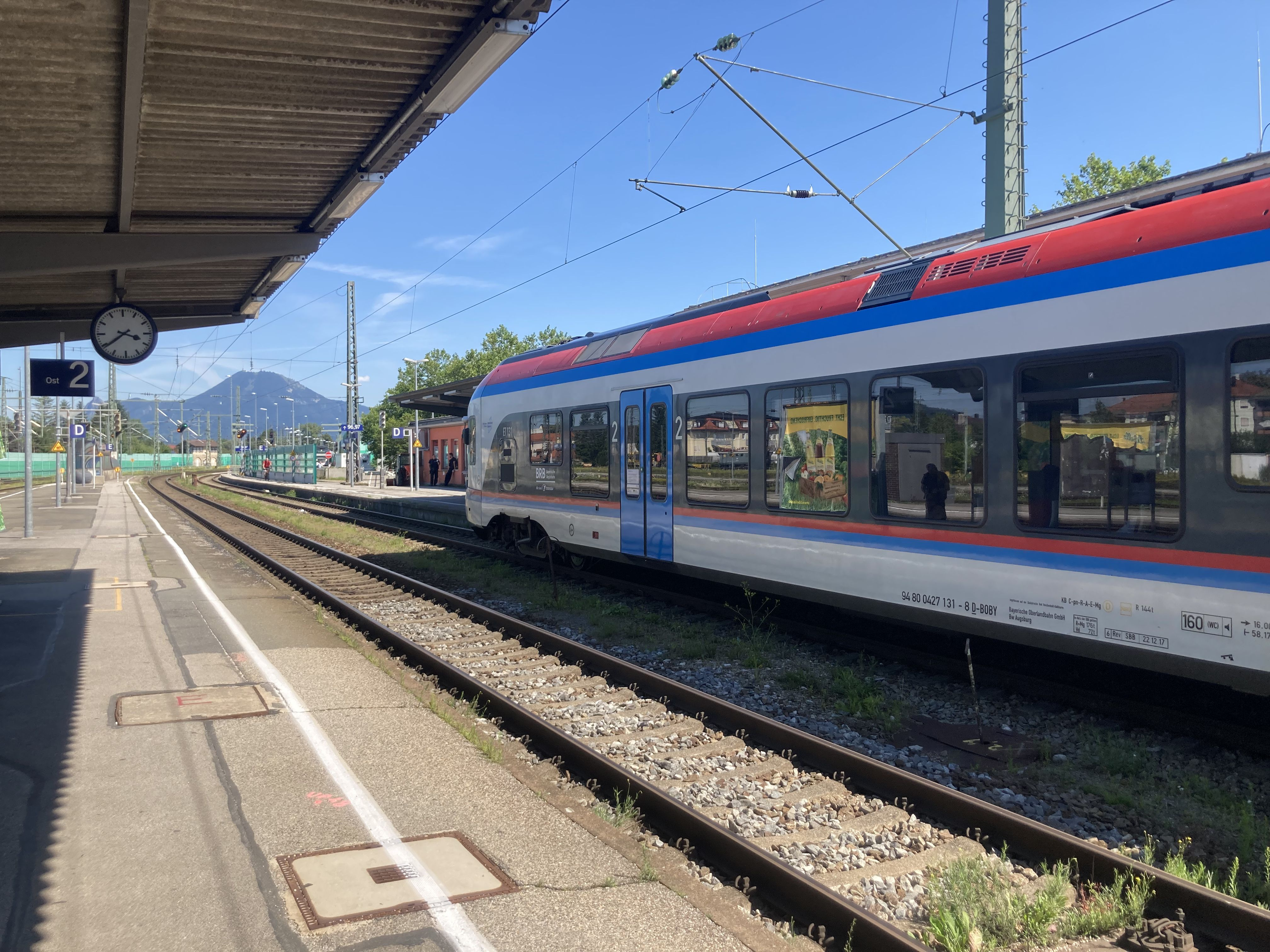

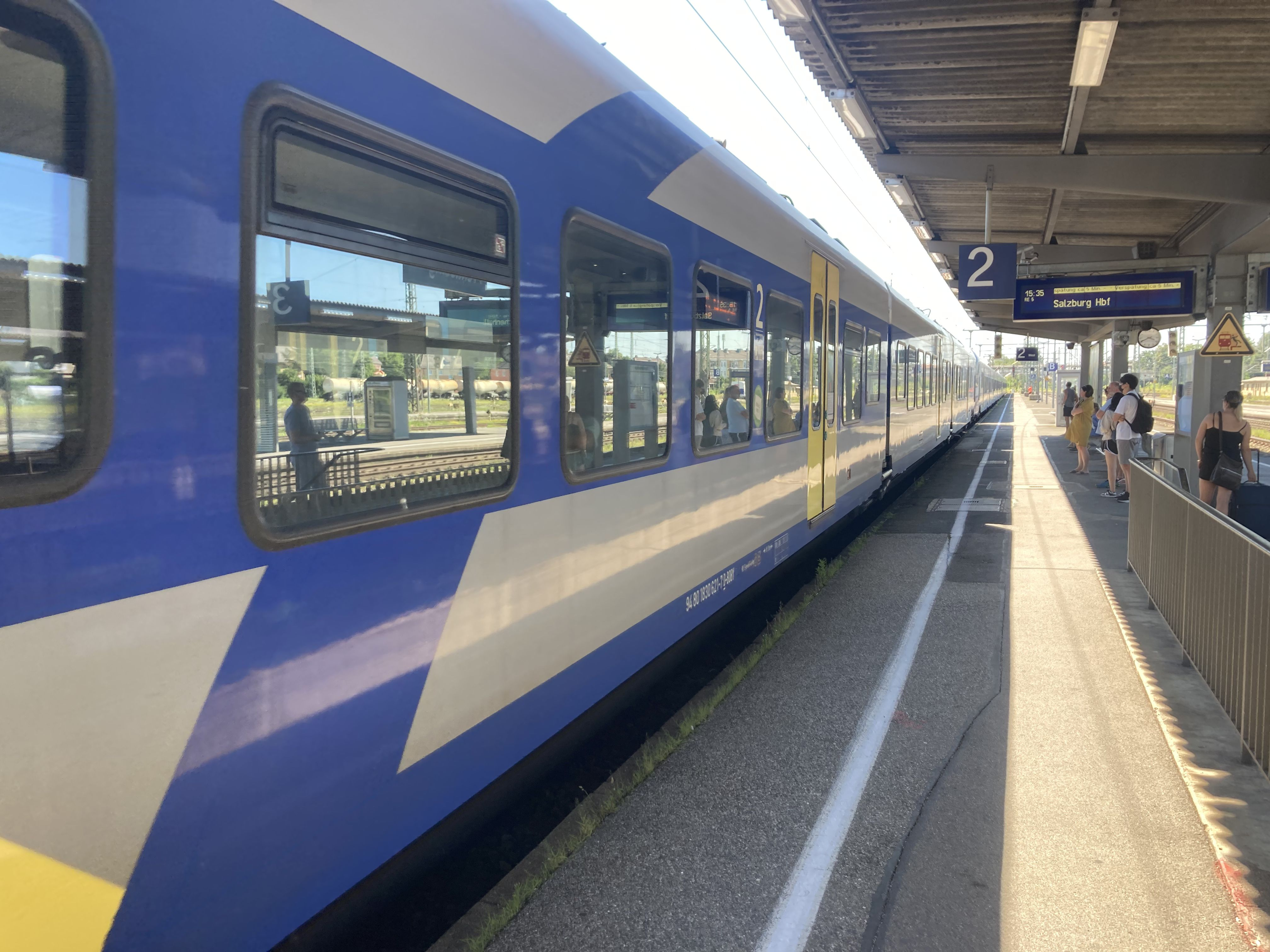

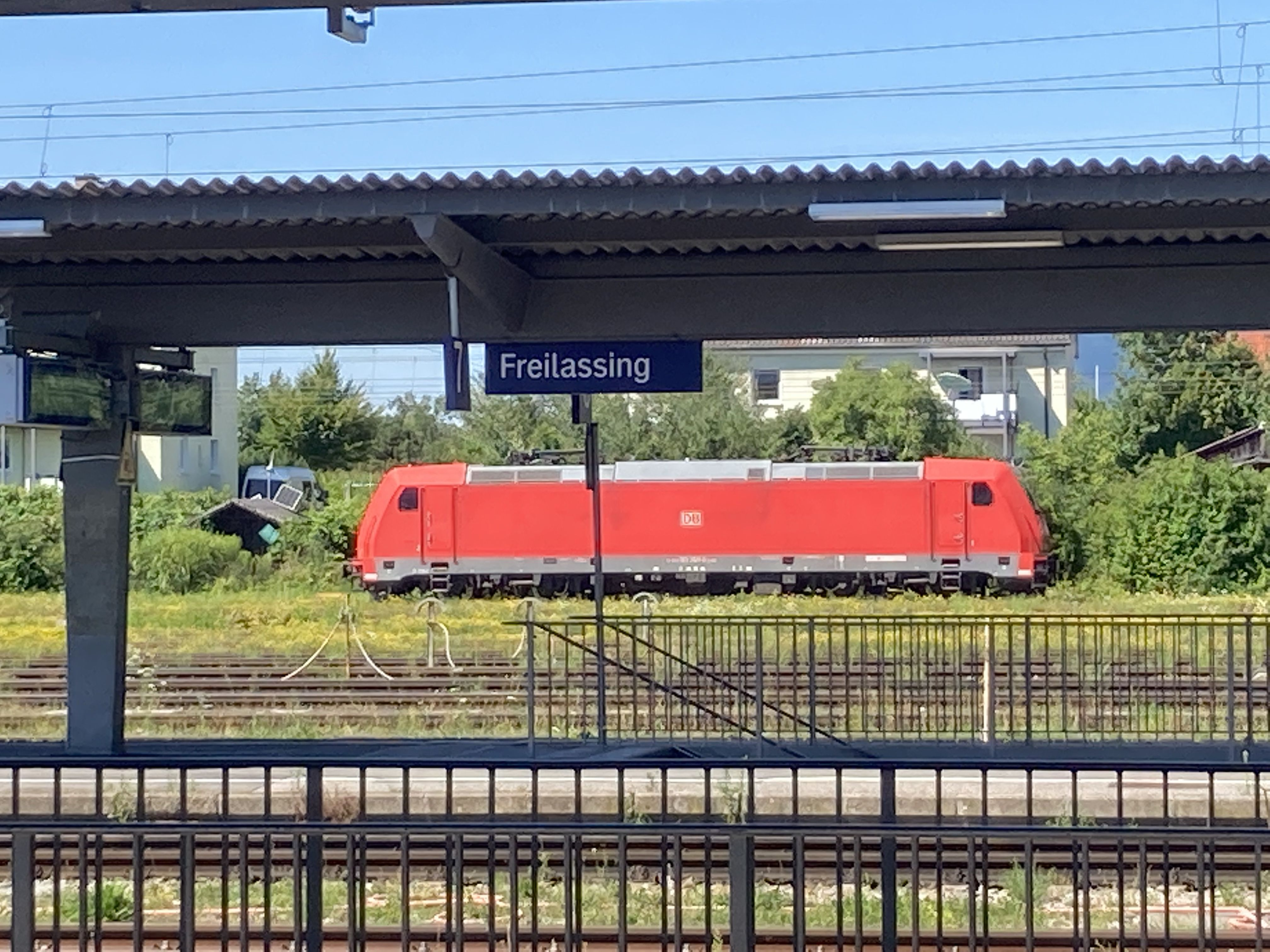

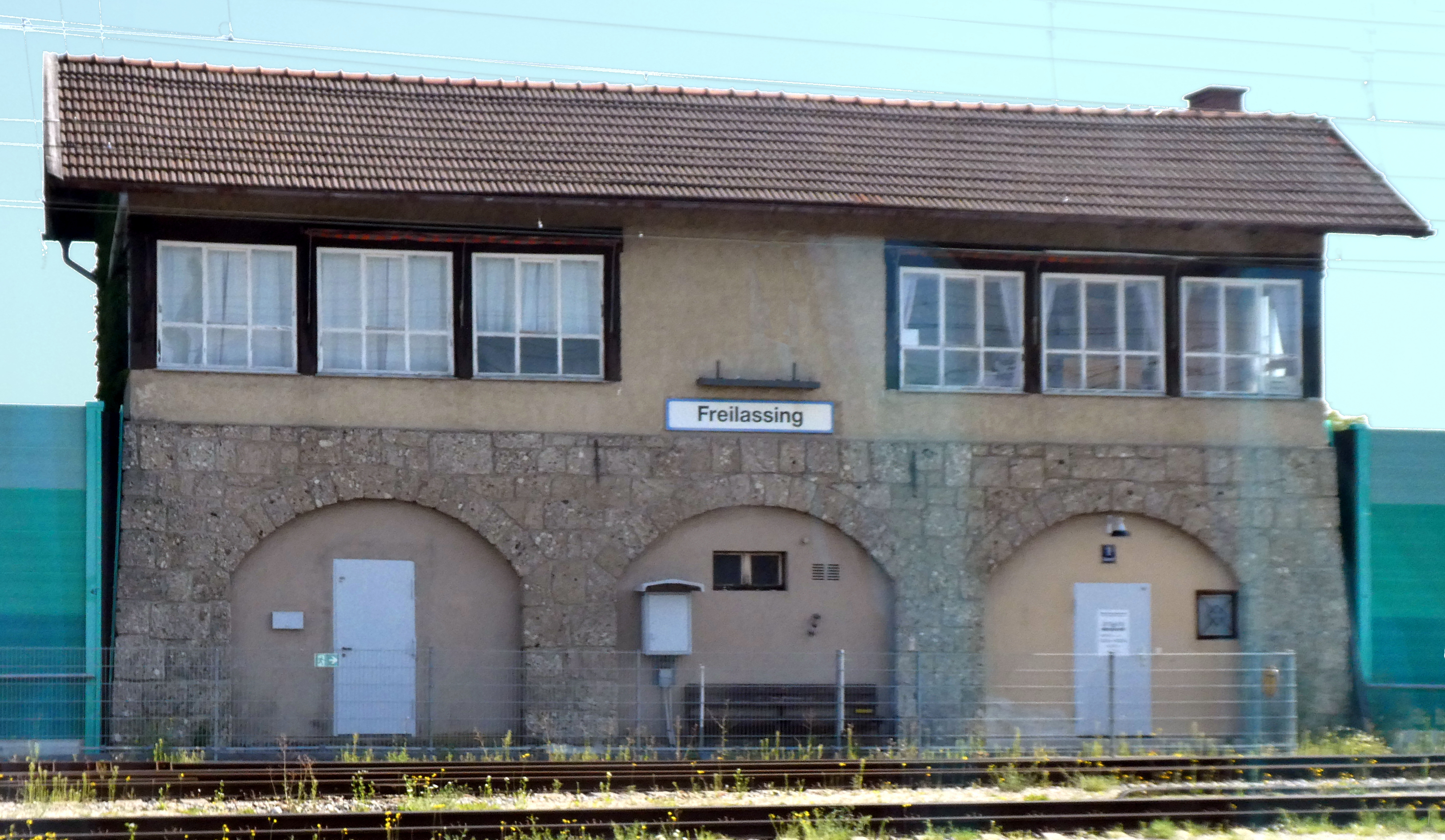

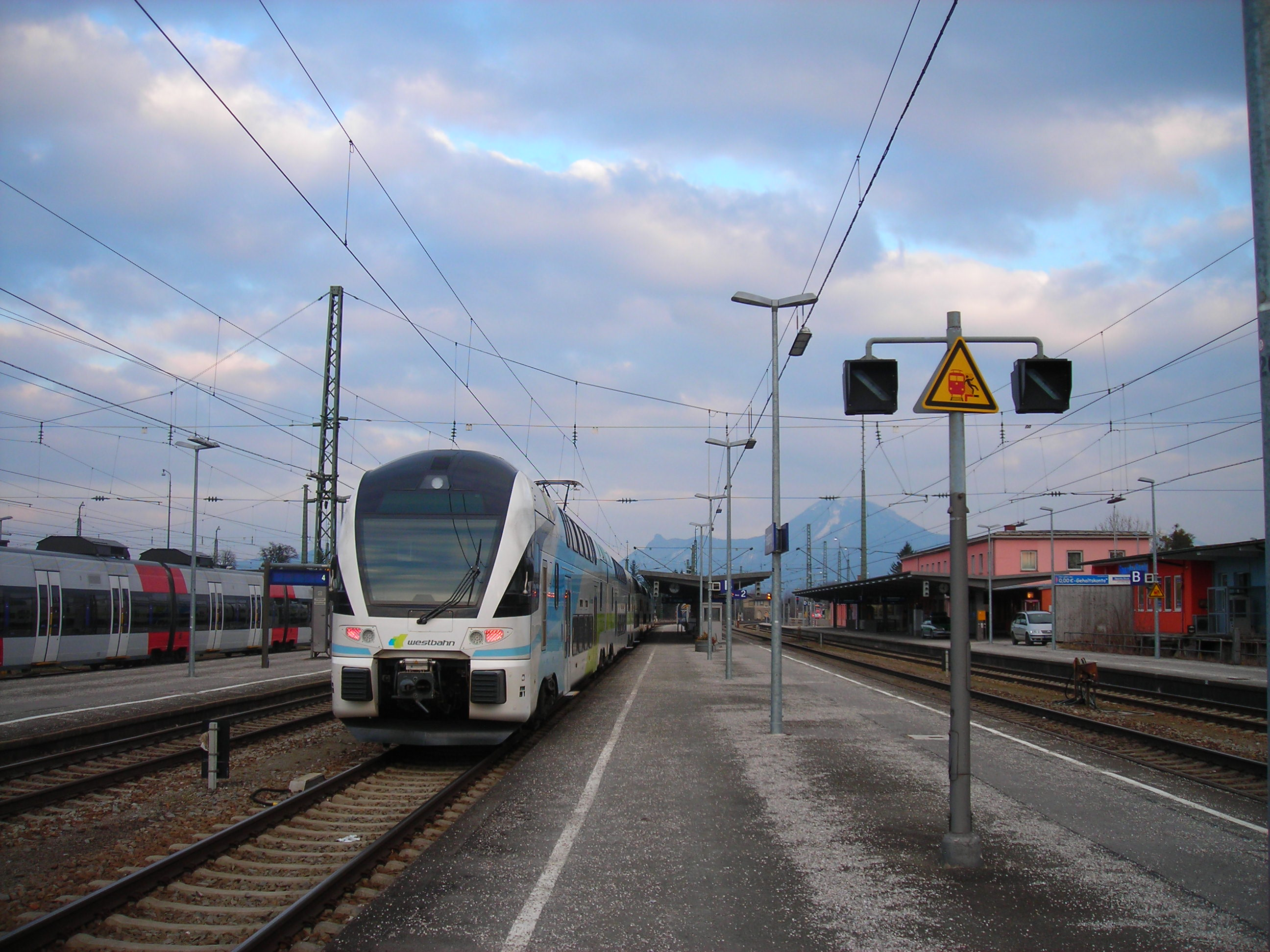
