= Münchberg–Selbitz railway =

Railway line in Upper Franconia, Germany

Overview
- Line number: 5024 (Selbitz–Helmbrechts), 5025 (Münchberg–Helmbrechts)

Service
- Route number: 853

Technical
- Line length: 20.3 km (12.6 mi)
- Track gauge: 1,435 mm (4 ft 8 1/2 in)

The Münchberg–Selbitz railway is a branch line in Bavaria in southern Germany. It runs from Münchberg via Helmbrechts to Selbitz. The Helmbrechts–Selbitz section has been since closed and dismantled. Passenger trains still run today between Münchberg and Helmbrechts.

== History ==
The Münchberg–Helmbrechts railway was built by the Royal Bavarian State Railways and opened on 1 June 1887. Its extension to Selbitz was completed by the Deutsche Reichsbahn and services began on 1 March 1924. As a result of falling numbers, passenger services were withdrawn from the Helmbrechts–Selbitz section on 30 May 1975 by the Deutsche Bahn and the line from Selbitz to Schauenstein was lifted in June 1977. Goods traffic continued to work the remaining stretch from Helmbrechts to Schauenstein until 31 March 1987 whilst the section beyond it was dismantled.

== Services ==
Regionalbahn trains on the present-day timetable route no. 853 are operated by the Vogtlandbahn under contract to Deutsche Bahn using diesel multiple units of VT 642 and RegioSprinter railbuses. The journey time between Münchberg and Helmbrechts is 15 minutes.

== Future ==
The route was declared by the Bayerische Eisenbahngesellschaft on 8 February 2008 to be part of the Upper Franconian Diesel Network (Dieselnetz Oberfranken) which will be launched on 12 June 2011 with new trains and improved levels of service.

== See also ==
- Royal Bavarian State Railways
- Bavarian branch lines

== Sources ==
- Andreas Kuhfahl, Wolfram Alteneder: Die Nebenbahnen der BD Nürnberg. Verlag C. Kersting, Bonn 1986, ISBN 3-925250-02-6.
- Siegfried Bufe: Eisenbahn in Oberfranken. Bufe-Fachbuch-Verlag, München 1982, ISBN 3-922138-13-6.
- Robert Zintl: Bayerische Nebenbahnen. Motorbuch Verlag, Stuttgart 1977, ISBN 3-87943-531-6.
- Deutsche Reichsbahn, Horst-Werner Dumjahn: Die deutschen Eisenbahnen in ihrer Entwicklung 1835–1935. Reichsdruckerei, Berlin 1935 / Nachdruck mit Vorwort von Horst-Werner Dumjahn: Dumjahn Verlag, Mainz 1984, ISBN 3-921426-29-4.
- Roland Fraas, Volker Seidel u. a.: 100 Jahre Lokalbahn Münchberg-Helmbrechts – 1887–1987 – Festschrift zum Jubiläum 6.–8. Juni 1987. Herausgeber: MEC 01 Münchberg e. V.
