= Salzburg S-Bahn =

Urban public transport network

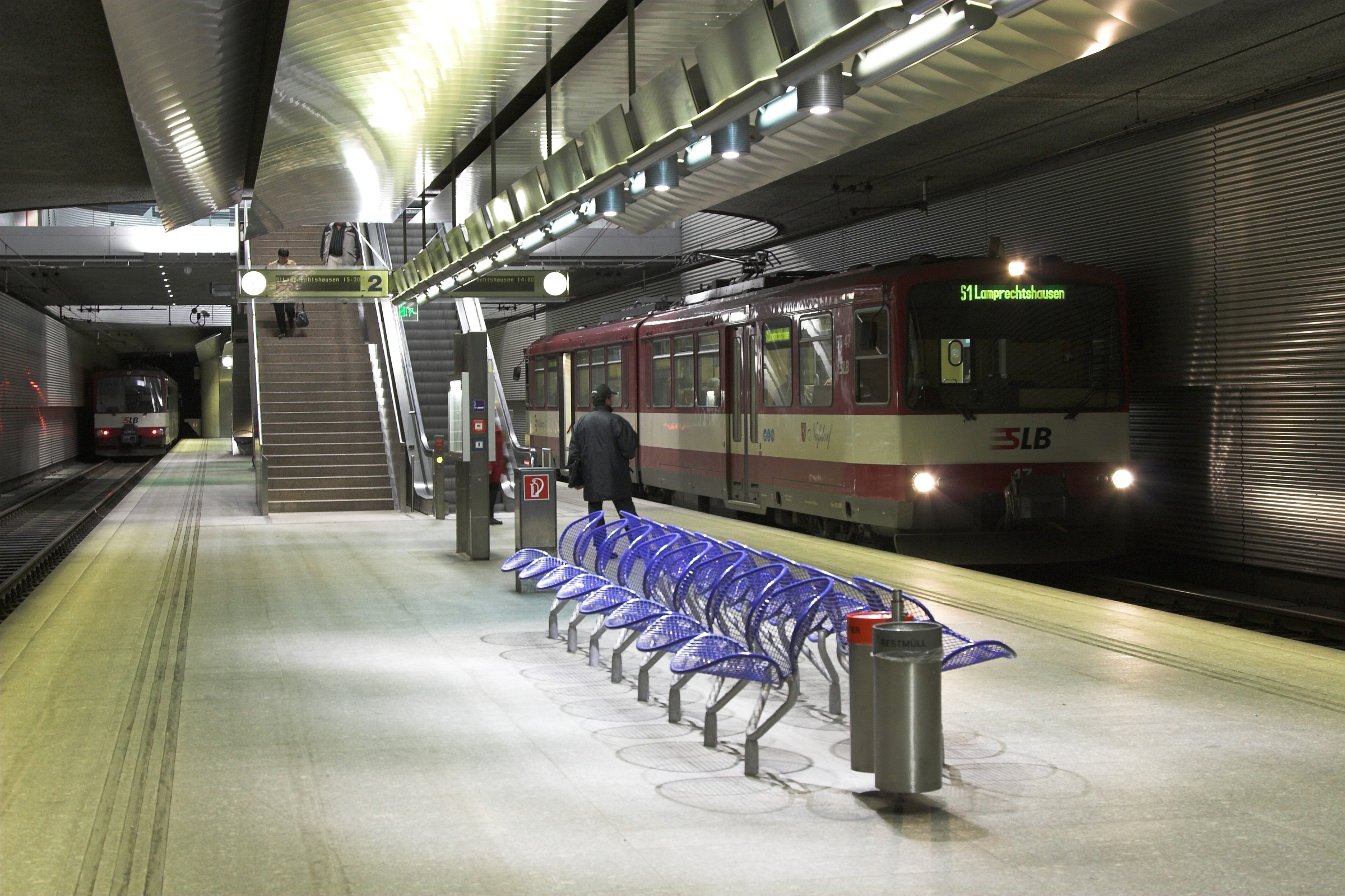
- The underground Salzburger Lokalbahn station

Overview
- Locale: Salzburg, Austria
- Transit type: S-Bahn
- Number of lines: 5
- Number of stations: 64
- Headquarters: Salzburg, Austria
- Website: Projekt S-Bahn Salzburg (in German)

Operation
- Began operation: 2004
- Operators: Salzburg AG; Austrian Federal Railways (ÖBB); Bayerische Oberlandbahn (BRB).
- Headway: 15'-60'

Technical
- System length: 130km
- Track gauge: 1,435 mm (4 ft 8 1/2 in) (standard gauge)
Salzburg S-Bahn
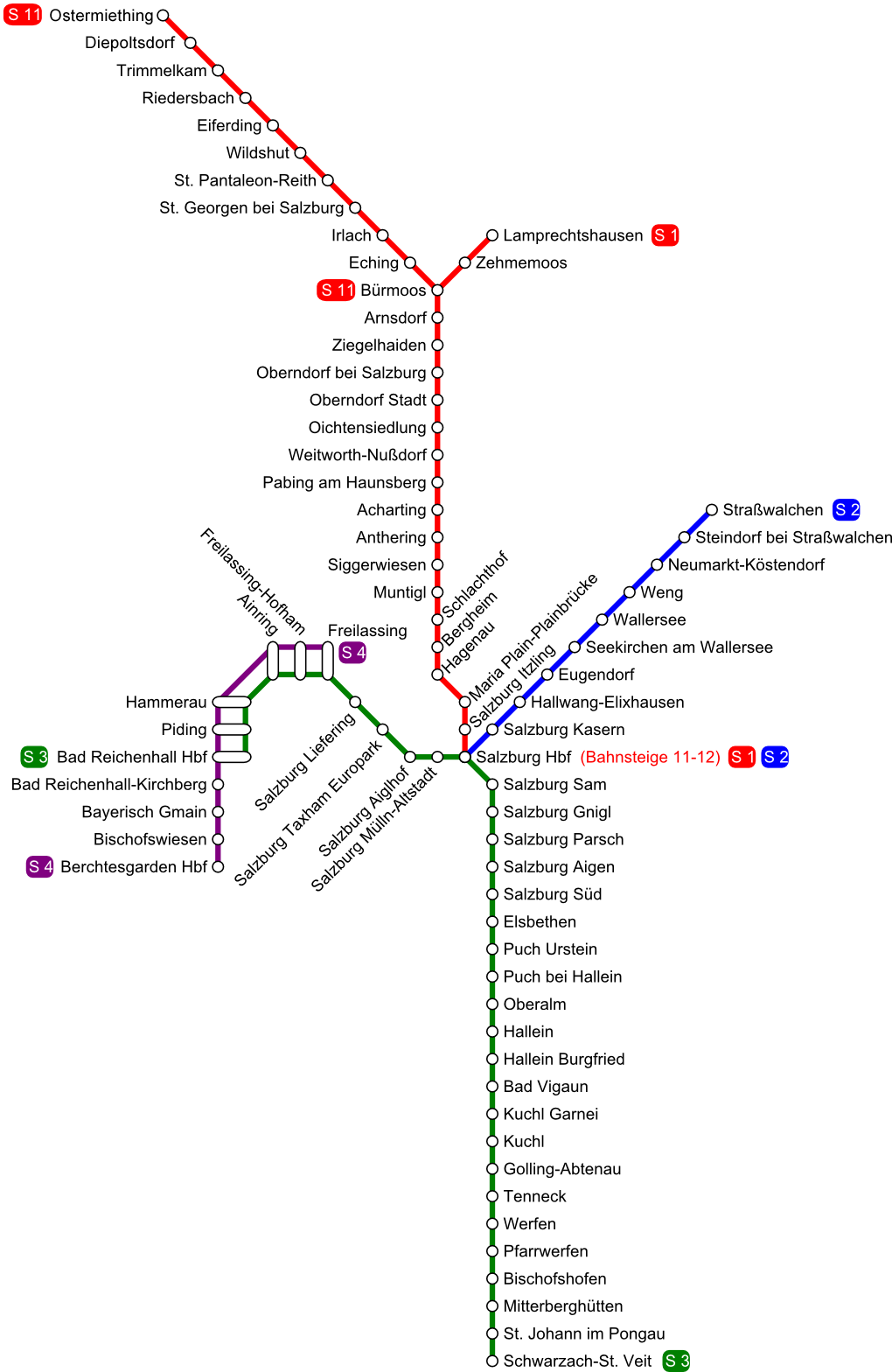
Salzburg S-Bahn network plan

The Salzburg S-Bahn is a large transport project in and around Salzburg in the Euroregion of Salzburg–Berchtesgadener Land–Traunstein, which crosses the border between Austria and Germany. Its S-Bahn network has been partially in operation since 2004 and its first stage was opened in 2014.

== History ==
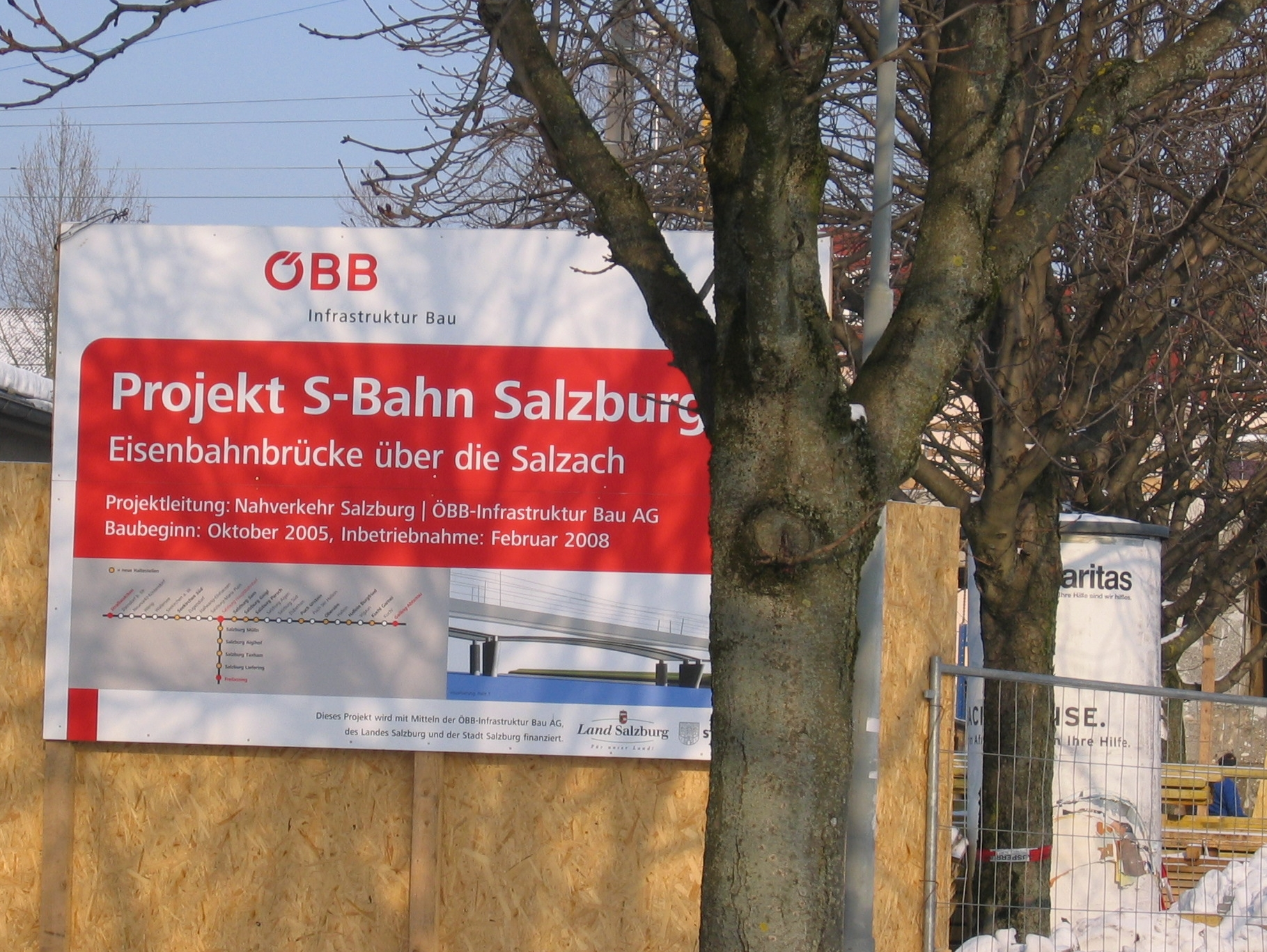
S-Bahn under construction

In 2009, Salzburg Hauptbahnhof was totally reconstructed. With the creation of additional through tracks for long-distance lines and the S-Bahn platform, the station's functionality was significantly improved. This will provide clearer pedestrian routes, full facilities for the disabled and improved services. It will also include the establishment of a wide passageway under the tracks, unifying some urban functions, and provide an improved access from the district of Schallmoos. The railway platforms will also be accessible from the nearby Nellböckviadukt.

Two urban stations, Salzburg Mülln-Altstadt and Salzburg Aiglhof, have been in operation since December 2009 and connect the S-Bahn and the urban public transport. Since that time, a third track has been added to the section from the Salzburg Hauptbahnhof to Salzburg Taxham Europark, which will allow an additional service on the western section, which will strengthen the railway for inner-city transportation.

In 2014, the line gained another urban station, Salzburg Liefering, and the western branch will have three continuous tracks to Freilassing. Afterwards, line S 2 will be extended to Freilassing, providing a 15-minute interval service between the Hauptbahnhof and Salzburg Freilassing station, which by then will be completely refurbished.

On the eastern branch with the Seekirchen Süd station is planned to provide better connectivity with central Seekirchen. In addition, the stations of Hallwang Elixhausen and Neumarkt Köstendorf are being modernised and upgraded as transport nodes.

== Network ==
The railway network comprises five lines, which are operated by three operators: Salzburg AG, Austrian Federal Railways (ÖBB) and Bayerische Oberlandbahn (BRB).

Salzburg Lokalbahnhof–Lamprechtshausen	Salzburg–Lamprechtshausen railway	Salzburg AG
Salzburg Lokalbahnhof–Trimmelkam	Salzburg–Lamprechtshausen railway Bürmoos–Trimmelkam railway	Salzburg AG
Salzburg Hbf–Straßwalchen	Western Railway	ÖBB
Bad Reichenhall–Schwarzach-St.Veit	Freilassing–Berchtesgaden railway Rosenheim–Salzburg railway Salzburg-Tyrol Railway	ÖBB
Freilassing–Berchtesgaden Hbf	Freilassing–Berchtesgaden railway	BRB

Currently, line S 2 ends at Salzburg Hauptbahnhof, as the western branch (Salzburg–Freilassing) and Salzburg Hauptbahnhof is not yet fully developed for the S-Bahn operation. To ensure that it has sufficient capacity for a 15-minute service, a third track is being built on the line between Salzburg Taxham Europark and Freilassing. As part of this work, which started in the spring of 2010, a new bridge is being built over the Saalach for the third track. A new railway bridge has already been built over the Salzach in the course of the building of a third track in central Salzburg from Salzburg Hauptbahnhof to Taxham.

The construction of the first station on the western branch (Salzburg Taxham Europark) began in the spring of 2005 and the station became operational in June 2006 and opened with the Europark, one of the largest shopping centres in Western Austria, and serves a school of the Missionaries of the Sacred Heart, the Red Bull Arena and a large number of households. Construction of the stations of Salzburg Mülln-Altstadt and Salzburg Aiglhof began in autumn of 2005 and they were opened on 12 December 2009. Thus the Paracelsus Private Medical University of Salzburg (PMU) and the Salzburg State Hospital will receive a connection to the new S-Bahn. Both stations are also stops on the Salzburg trolley bus network and the bus routes of Albus Salzburg Verkehrsbetrieb (the Salzburg municipal bus company) and some regional bus services.

== Operations ==
=== Fares ===
The entire S-Bahn Salzburg is integrated in the fare scheme of the Salzburg Transport Association (Salzburger Verkehrsverbund, SVV). In the city of Salzburg, the train can thus be used in the core zone with the same tickets as used for buses (a 24-hour ticket or a single ticket).

=== Clockface timetable ===
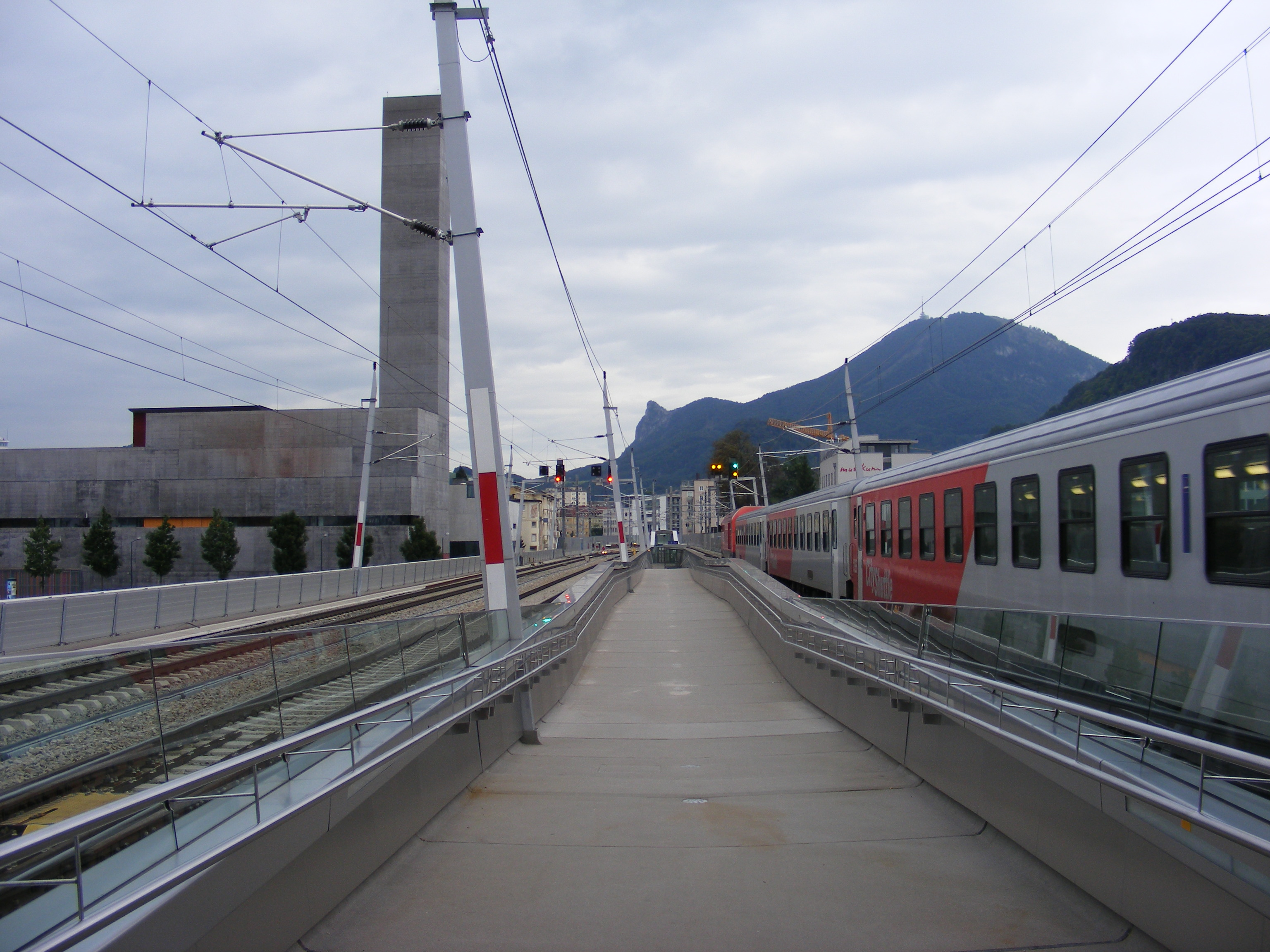
Superstructure of the newly built railway bridge in central Salzburg

Trains on the lines S 1 and S 3 run on a basic 30-minute timetable (with additional services on line S 1 during the peaks to provide services every 15 minute). The S 2 and S 4 services will initially run every hour (with additional services during the peak hour) and line S 11, an outer branch of line S 1 will also operate hourly.

The timetable of line S 1 is not well timed for connections at Salzburg Hauptbahnhof to the other lines due to a noticeably divergent symmetry minute.

After the completion of the work, the services of S 2 and S 3 on the trunk route through the densely built-up urban area between Salzburg Hauptbahnhof and Freilassing will be timed to give a 15-minute interval schedule.

At the end points of S-Bahn lines S 2 and S 3 at present some trains continue to operate as Regionalbahn services.

== Rolling stock ==
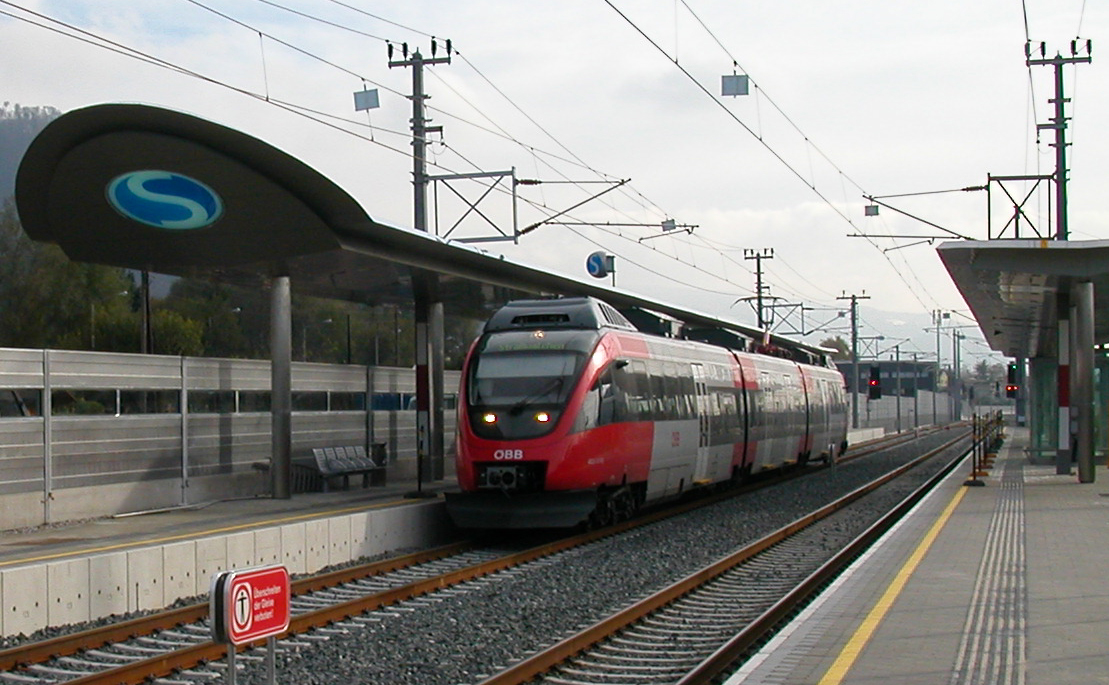
Class 4023 set on the S 3 in Salzburg Sam

Lines S 2 and S 3 are operated by ÖBB with Bombardier Talent electric multiple units, consisting of 11 three carriage sets (ÖBB class 4023) and 10 four carriage sets (class 4024).

Salzburg AG operated lines S 1 and S 11 with 18 two carriage DC electric multiple units built by Simmering-Graz-Pauker or its successors.

From December 2009 until December 2021, the BLB has operated the line S4 between Freilassing and Berchtesgaden, using five FLIRT railcars. Since December 2021, the Bayerische Oberlandbahn (BRB) is the operator of the S4.

== Future expansion ==
The S1 and S11 lines from Lamprechtshausen and Ostermiething to Salzburg Hauptbahnhof are planned to be extended to a new Mirabellplatz underground terminus station via a 750-metre tunnel, at a projected cost of €140 million. Construction for the extension may begin in 2023. A future extension to Salzburg South is estimated to cost €300 million.
