= Petersaurach Nord station =

Railway station in Germany

Petersaurach Nord

General information
- Location: Gleizendorfer Straße 100; Petersaurach, Bavaria; Germany
- Coordinates: 49°19′06″N 10°44′21″E
- Owner: DB Netz
- Operator: DB Station&Service
- Line: Nuremberg–Crailsheim line
- Platforms: 2 side platforms
- Tracks: 2
- Train operators: DB Regio Bayern

Other information
- Station code: 8193
- DS100 code: NPEN
- IBNR: 8004797
- Category: 6
- Fare zone: VGN: 741
- Website: www.bahnhof.de

History
- Opened: 12 September 2014

Services
Preceding station	Nuremberg S-Bahn	Following station
Wicklesgreuth towards Crailsheim	S4	Heilsbronn towards Nürnberg Hbf
Location

Petersaurach Nord station is a railway station in the north of the municipality of Petersaurach, located in the Ansbach district in Middle Franconia, Germany.
