= Sachsen (b Ansbach) station =

Railway station in Germany

Sachsen (b Ansbach)

General information
- Location: Bahnhofstraße 2 Sachsen bei Ansbach, Bavaria; Germany
- Coordinates: 49°17′35″N 10°39′41″E
- Elevation: 437 m (1,434 ft)
- Owner: DB Netz
- Operator: DB Station&Service
- Lines: Nuremberg–Crailsheim line (KBS 786/KBS 890.4)
- Distance: 37.0 km (23.0 mi) from Nürnberg Hauptbahnhof
- Platforms: 2 side platforms
- Tracks: 2
- Train operators: DB Regio Bayern

Other information
- Station code: 5464
- DS100 code: NSA
- IBNR: 8005250
- Category: 6
- Fare zone: VGN: 751
- Website: www.bahnhof.de

Services
Preceding station	Nuremberg S-Bahn	Following station
Ansbach towards Crailsheim	S4	Wicklesgreuth towards Nürnberg Hbf
Location

Sachsen (b Ansbach) station is a railway station in the municipality of Sachsen bei Ansbach, located in the Ansbach district in Bavaria, Germany. The station is on the Nuremberg–Crailsheim line of Deutsche Bahn.
