= Raitersaich station =

Railway station in Germany

Raitersaich

General information
- Location: Müncherlbacher Straße 1 Roßtal, Bavaria; Germany
- Coordinates: 49°22′30″N 10°50′37″E
- Owner: DB Netz
- Operator: DB Station&Service
- Lines: Nuremberg–Crailsheim line (KBS 786/KBS 890.4)
- Distance: 20.0 km (12.4 mi) from Nürnberg Hauptbahnhof
- Platforms: 2 side platforms
- Tracks: 2
- Train operators: DB Regio Bayern

Other information
- Station code: 5105
- DS100 code: NRAH
- IBNR: 8004926
- Category: 6
- Fare zone: VGN: 815 and 721
- Website: www.bahnhof.de

Services
Preceding station	Nuremberg S-Bahn	Following station
Heilsbronn towards Crailsheim	S4	Roßtal Wegbrücke towards Nürnberg Hbf
Location

Raitersaich station is a railway station in the municipality of Raitersaich, located in the Fürth district in Bavaria, Germany. The station is on the Nuremberg–Crailsheim line of Deutsche Bahn.
