= Roßtal station =

Railway station in Fürth, Germany

Roßtal

General information
- Location: Obere Bahnhofstraße 8 Roßtal, Bavaria; Germany
- Coordinates: 49°24′03″N 10°53′55″E
- Elevation: 368 m (1,207 ft)
- Owner: DB Netz
- Operator: DB Station&Service
- Lines: Nuremberg–Crailsheim railway (KBS 786/KBS 890.4)
- Distance: 14.7 km (9.1 mi) from Nürnberg Hauptbahnhof
- Platforms: 2 side platforms
- Tracks: 2
- Train operators: DB Regio Bayern; Go-Ahead Baden-Württemberg
- Connections: 112 114 713

Other information
- Station code: 5362
- DS100 code: NRL
- IBNR: 8005177
- Category: 5
- Fare zone: VGN: 815
- Website: www.bahnhof.de

Services
Preceding station		Following station
Heilsbronn towards Stuttgart Hbf	RE 90	Nürnberg Hbf Terminus
Preceding station	Nuremberg S-Bahn	Following station
Roßtal Wegbrücke towards Crailsheim	S4	Anwanden towards Nürnberg Hbf
Location

Roßtal station is a railway station in the municipality of Roßtal, located in the Fürth district in Bavaria, Germany. The station is on the Nuremberg–Crailsheim line of Deutsche Bahn.
