= Wicklesgreuth station =

Railway station in Ansbach, Germany

Wicklesgreuth
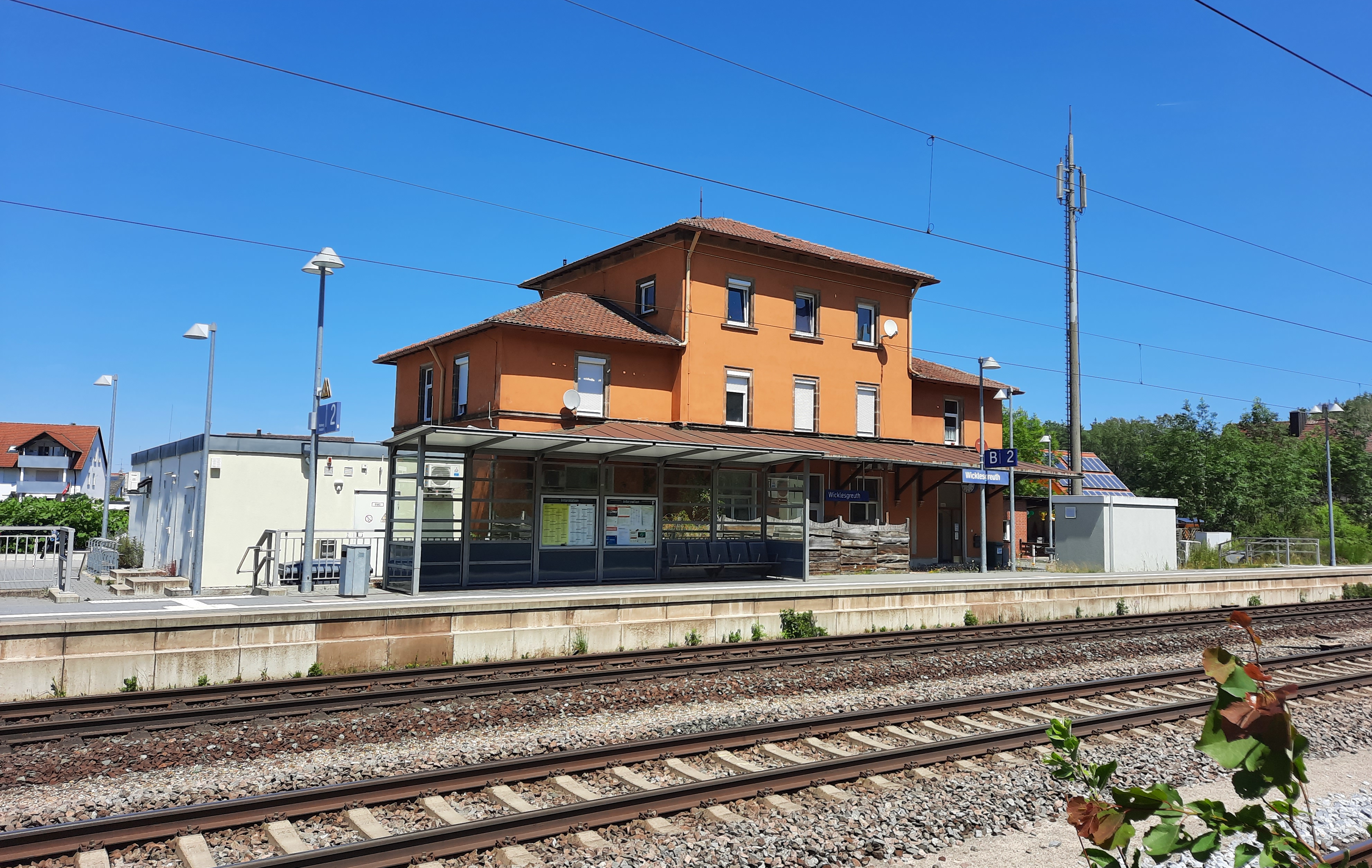
- 2024

General information
- Location: Bahnhofstraße 13; Petersaurach, Bavaria; Germany
- Coordinates: 49°18′39″N 10°42′41″E
- Owner: Deutsche Bahn
- Operator: DB InfraGO
- Lines: Nuremberg–Crailsheim line; Wicklesgreuth–Windsbach line
- Distance: 32.5 km (20.2 mi) from Nürnberg Hauptbahnhof
- Platforms: 1 island platform; 1 side platform
- Tracks: 3
- Train operators: DB Regio Bayern; Arverio Baden-Württemberg

Other information
- Station code: 6732
- DS100 code: NWK
- IBNR: 8006390
- Category: 4
- Fare zone: VGN: 741
- Website: www.bahnhof.de

History
- Opened: 15 May 1875

Services
Preceding station		Following station
Ansbach towards Stuttgart Hbf	RE 90	Heilsbronn towards Nürnberg Hbf
Preceding station	DB Regio Bayern	Following station
Terminus	RB 91	Petersaurach towards Windsbach
Preceding station	Nuremberg S-Bahn	Following station
Sachsen (b Ansbach) towards Crailsheim	S4	Petersaurach Nord towards Nürnberg Hbf
Location

Wicklesgreuth station is a railway station in the Wicklesgreuth district of the municipality of Petersaurach, located in the Ansbach district in Middle Franconia, Germany. The station is located at the junction of the Nuremberg–Crailsheim and Wicklesgreuth–Windsbach lines of Deutsche Bahn.
