= Unterasbach station =

Railway station in Fürth, Germany

Unterasbach

General information
- Location: Oberweihersbucherstr. 2 Oberasbach, Bavaria; Germany
- Coordinates: 49°25′00″N 10°59′07″E
- Elevation: 324 m (1,063 ft)
- Owner: DB Netz
- Operator: DB Station&Service
- Lines: Nuremberg–Crailsheim railway (KBS 786/KBS 890.4)
- Distance: 7.8 km (4.8 mi) from Nürnberg Hauptbahnhof
- Platforms: 2 side platforms
- Tracks: 2
- Train operators: DB Regio Bayern

Other information
- Station code: 6342
- DS100 code: NUA
- IBNR: 8005976
- Category: 6
- Fare zone: VGN: 200 and 700
- Website: www.bahnhof.de

Services
Preceding station	Nuremberg S-Bahn	Following station
Oberasbach towards Crailsheim	S4	Nürnberg-Stein towards Nürnberg Hbf
Location

Unterasbach station is a railway station in the municipality of Oberasbach, located in the Fürth district in Bavaria, Germany. The station is on the Nuremberg–Crailsheim line of Deutsche Bahn.
