= Roßtal Wegbrücke station =

Railway station in Germany

Roßtal Wegbrücke

General information
- Location: Brückenweg 1 Roßtal, Bavaria; Germany
- Coordinates: 49°23′41″N 10°53′07″E
- Owner: DB Netz
- Operator: DB Station&Service
- Lines: Nuremberg–Crailsheim line (KBS 786/KBS 890.4)
- Distance: 15.7 km (9.8 mi) from Nürnberg Hauptbahnhof
- Platforms: 2 side platforms
- Tracks: 2
- Train operators: DB Regio Bayern

Other information
- Station code: 5363
- DS100 code: NRW
- IBNR: 8005178
- Category: 6
- Fare zone: VGN: 815
- Website: www.bahnhof.de

Services
Preceding station	Nuremberg S-Bahn	Following station
Raitersaich towards Crailsheim	S4	Roßtal towards Nürnberg Hbf
Location

Roßtal Wegbrücke station is a railway station in the municipality of Roßtal, located in the Fürth district in Bavaria, Germany. The station is on the Nuremberg–Crailsheim line of Deutsche Bahn.
