= Oberasbach station =

Railway station in Fürth, Germany

Oberasbach

General information
- Location: Bachstr. 47; Oberasbach, Bavaria; Germany
- Coordinates: 49°25′00″N 10°57′51″E
- Elevation: 336 m (1,102 ft)
- Owner: DB Netz
- Operator: DB Station&Service
- Lines: Nuremberg–Crailsheim (KBS 786/KBS 890.4)
- Distance: 9.2 km (5.7 mi) from Nürnberg Hauptbahnhof
- Platforms: 2 side platforms
- Tracks: 2
- Train operators: DB Regio Bayern

Other information
- Station code: 4619
- DS100 code: NOA
- IBNR: 8004504
- Category: 6
- Fare zone: VGN: 200 and 700
- Website: www.bahnhof.de

Services
Preceding station	Nuremberg S-Bahn	Following station
Anwanden towards Crailsheim	S4	Unterasbach towards Nürnberg Hbf
Location

Oberasbach station is a railway station in the municipality of Oberasbach, located in the Fürth district in Bavaria, Germany. The station is on the Nuremberg–Crailsheim line of Deutsche Bahn.
