= Petersaurach station =

Railway station in Germany

Petersaurach
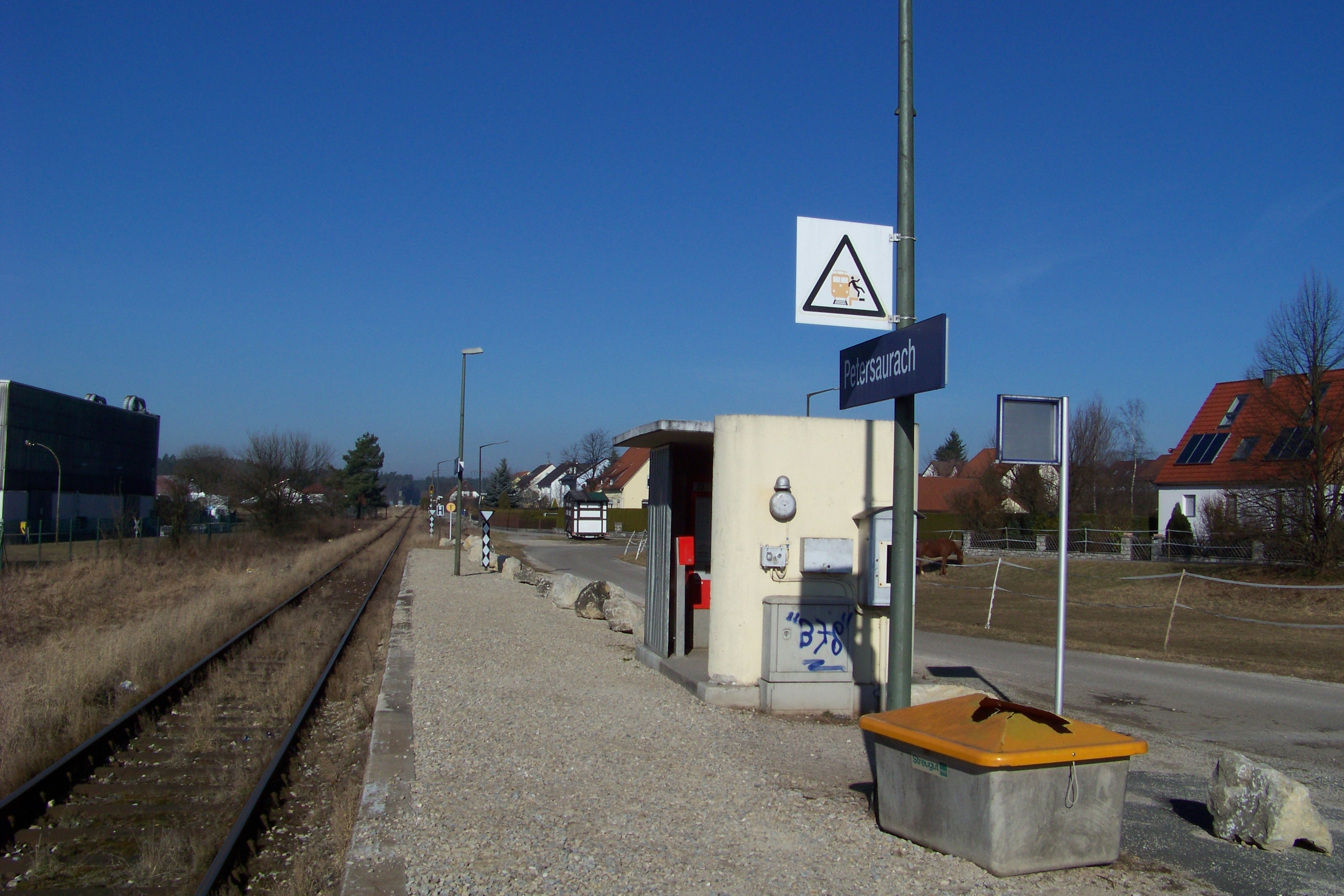

General information
- Location: Industriestraße 31; 91580 Petersaurach; Bavaria; Germany
- Coordinates: 49.3038°N 10.7452°E
- Owner: DB Netz
- Operator: DB Station&Service
- Line: Wicklesgreuth–Windsbach railway
- Platforms: 1 side platform
- Tracks: 1
- Train operators: DB Regio Bayern

Other information
- Station code: 4901
- DS100 code: NPET
- IBNR: 8004774
- Category: 7
- Fare zone: VGN: 771
- Website: www.bahnhof.de

History
- Opened: 1 December 1894; 131 years ago

Services
Preceding station	DB Regio Bayern	Following station
Wicklesgreuth Terminus	RB 91	Neuendettelsau towards Windsbach
Location
- Location within Bavaria Location within Germany Location within Europe

Petersaurach station is a railway station in the south of the municipality of Petersaurach, located in the Ansbach district in Middle Franconia, Germany.
