= Schnelldorf station =

Railway station in Germany

Schnelldorf

General information
- Location: Bahnhofstraße 23; 91625 Schnelldorf; Bavaria; Germany
- Coordinates: 49.1943°N 10.1780°E
- System: Bf
- Owner: Deutsche Bahn
- Operator: DB Station&Service
- Lines: Nuremberg–Crailsheim railway (KBS 786)
- Platforms: 2 side platforms
- Tracks: 2
- Train operators: Go-Ahead Baden-Württemberg

Other information
- Station code: 5628
- DS100 code: NSNE
- IBNR: 8005388
- Category: 6
- Fare zone: VGN: 1742 and 1751; KVSH: 57101 (VGN transitional zone) (Note: In this zone, KVSH fares only apply to bus transport.)
- Website: www.bahnhof.de

History
- Opened: 15 June 1875; 151 years ago

Services
Preceding station		Following station
Crailsheim towards Stuttgart Hbf	RE 90	Dombühl towards Nürnberg Hbf
Preceding station	Nuremberg S-Bahn	Following station
Crailsheim Terminus	S4	Dombühl towards Nürnberg Hbf
Location
- Location within Bavaria Location within Germany Location within Europe

Schnelldorf station is a railway station in the municipality of Schnelldorf, located in the Ansbach district in Middle Franconia, Germany.
