= Heilsbronn station =

German railway station

Heilsbronn
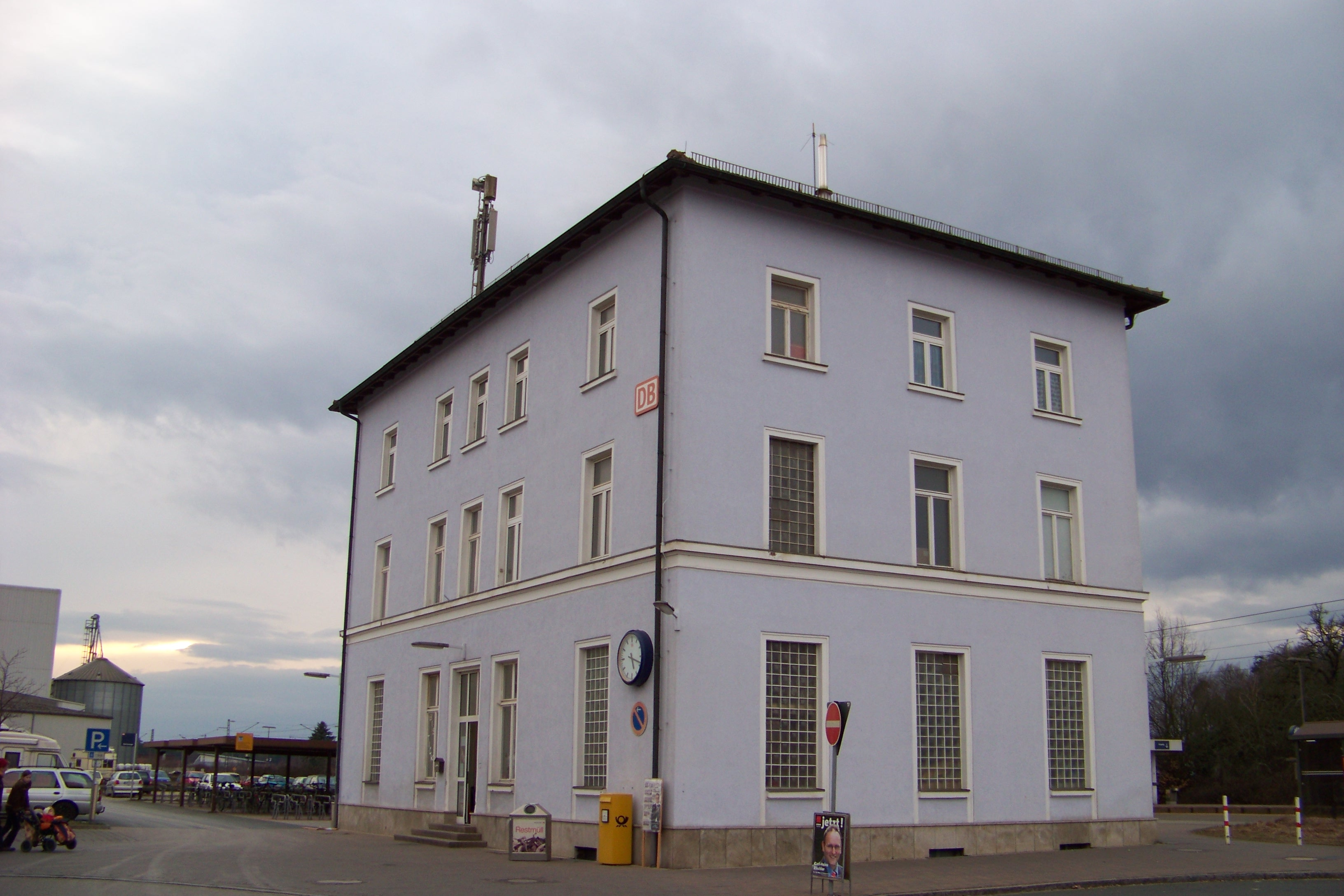
- The station building in 2008

General information
- Location: Bahnhofplatz 4 Heilsbronn, Bavaria; Germany
- Coordinates: 49°20′46″N 10°47′28″E
- Elevation: 422 m (1,385 ft)
- Owner: DB Netz
- Operator: DB Station&Service
- Lines: Nuremberg–Crailsheim line (KBS 786/KBS 890.4)
- Distance: 25.3 km (15.7 mi) from Nürnberg Hauptbahnhof
- Platforms: 2 side platforms
- Tracks: 2
- Train operators: DB Regio Bayern; Go-Ahead Baden-Württemberg

Other information
- Station code: 2657
- DS100 code: NHE
- IBNR: 8002705
- Category: 5
- Fare zone: VGN: 731
- Website: www.bahnhof.de

Services
Preceding station		Following station
Wicklesgreuth towards Stuttgart Hbf	RE 90	Roßtal towards Nürnberg Hbf
Preceding station	Nuremberg S-Bahn	Following station
Petersaurach Nord towards Crailsheim	S4	Raitersaich towards Nürnberg Hbf
Location

Heilsbronn station is a railway station in the municipality of Heilsbronn, located in the Ansbach district in Bavaria, Germany. The station is on the Nuremberg–Crailsheim line of Deutsche Bahn.

== Notable places nearby ==
- Heilsbronn Abbey
