= Leutershausen-Wiedersbach station =

Railway station in Germany

Leutershausen-Wiedersbach

General information
- Location: Schalkhäuser Straße 14; Leutershausen, Bavaria; Germany
- Coordinates: 49°17′42″N 10°26′24″E
- Owner: DB Netz
- Operator: DB Station&Service
- Line: Nuremberg–Crailsheim line
- Distance: 53.8 km (33.4 mi) from Nürnberg Hauptbahnhof
- Platforms: 2 side platforms
- Tracks: 2
- Train operators: DB Regio Bayern; Go-Ahead Baden-Württemberg

Other information
- Station code: 3686
- DS100 code: NLWI
- IBNR: 8003664
- Category: 6
- Fare zone: VGN: 1721 and 1722
- Website: www.bahnhof.de

History
- Opened: 1 July 1875; 10 December 2017
- Closed: 1966

Services
Preceding station		Following station
Dombühl towards Stuttgart Hbf	RE 90	Ansbach towards Nürnberg Hbf
Preceding station	Nuremberg S-Bahn	Following station
Dombühl towards Crailsheim	S4	Ansbach towards Nürnberg Hbf
Location

Leutershausen-Wiedersbach station is a railway station in the municipality of Leutershausen, located in the Ansbach district in Middle Franconia, Germany. The station is on the Nuremberg–Crailsheim line of Deutsche Bahn.
