= Nürnberg-Schweinau station =

Railway station in Nuremberg, Germany

Nürnberg Schweinau
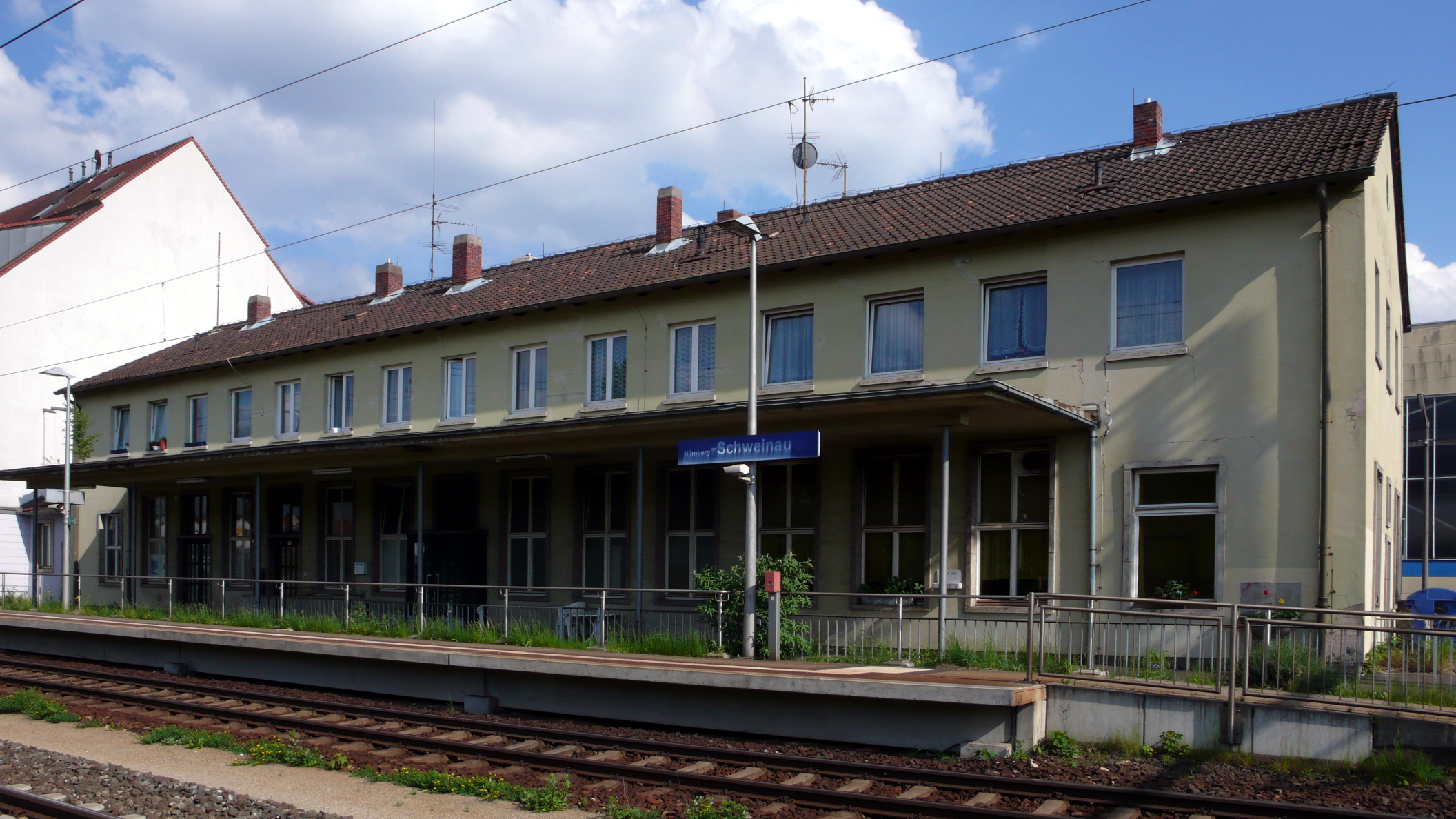
- The former station building in 2008

General information
- Location: Eisenstraße; Nuremberg, Bavaria; Germany
- Coordinates: 49°26′04″N 11°02′43″E
- Owner: DB Netz
- Operator: DB Station&Service
- Lines: Nuremberg–Crailsheim line (KBS 786/KBS 890.4)
- Distance: 3.0 km (1.9 mi) from Nürnberg Hauptbahnhof
- Platforms: 2 side platforms
- Tracks: 2
- Train operators: DB Regio Bayern

Other information
- Station code: 4610
- DS100 code: NNSW
- IBNR: 8004485
- Category: 6
- Fare zone: VGN: 100 and 200
- Website: www.bahnhof.de

History
- Opened: 15 May 1875

Services
Preceding station	Nuremberg S-Bahn	Following station
Stein towards Crailsheim	S4	Nürnberg Hbf Terminus
Location

Nürnberg-Schweinau station is a railway station in the Schweinau district of Nürnberg, Franconia, Germany. The station is on the Nuremberg–Crailsheim line of Deutsche Bahn.
