= Anwanden station =

Railway station in Zirndorf, Germany

Anwanden

General information
- Location: Taubenweg 5 Zirndorf, Bavaria; Germany
- Coordinates: 49°24′42″N 10°55′49″E
- Elevation: 348 m (1,142 ft)
- Owner: DB Netz
- Operator: DB Station&Service
- Lines: Nuremberg–Crailsheim line (KBS 786/KBS 890.4)
- Distance: 12.1 km (7.5 mi) from Nürnberg Hauptbahnhof
- Platforms: 2 side platforms
- Tracks: 2
- Train operators: DB Regio Bayern

Other information
- Station code: 163
- DS100 code: NAWN
- IBNR: 8000588
- Category: 6
- Fare zone: VGN: 200 and 700
- Website: www.bahnhof.de

Services
Preceding station	Nuremberg S-Bahn	Following station
Roßtal towards Crailsheim	S4	Oberasbach towards Nürnberg Hbf
Location

Anwanden station is a railway station in the municipality of Anwanden, located in the Fürth district in Bavaria, Germany. The station is on the Nuremberg–Crailsheim line of Deutsche Bahn.
