= Dombühl station =

Railway station in Germany

Dombühl
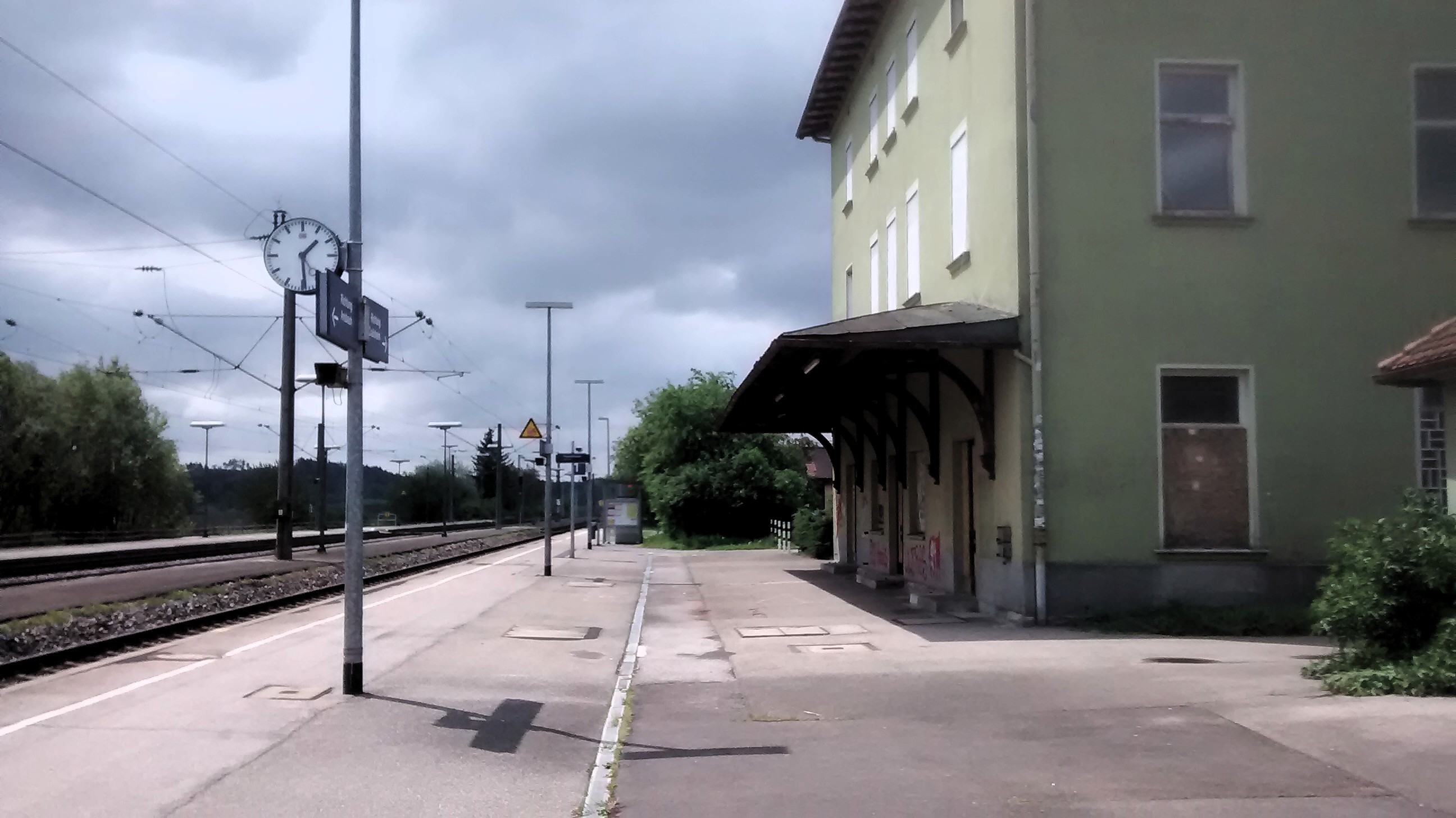
- The station in 2016

General information
- Location: Am Bahnhof 2 Dombühl, Bavaria; Germany
- Coordinates: 49°15′08″N 10°17′55″E
- Owner: DB Netz
- Operator: DB Station&Service
- Lines: Nuremberg–Crailsheim railway (KBS 786)
- Distance: 67.1 km (41.7 mi) from Nürnberg Hauptbahnhof
- Platforms: 1 island platform; 1 side platform
- Tracks: 3
- Train operators: DB Regio Bayern; Go-Ahead Baden-Württemberg

Other information
- Station code: 1259
- DS100 code: NDB
- IBNR: 8000365
- Category: 5
- Fare zone: VGN: 1732 and 1743
- Website: www.bahnhof.de

History
- Opened: 15 June 1875

Services
Preceding station		Following station
Schnelldorf towards Stuttgart Hbf	RE 90	Leutershausen-Wiedersbach towards Nürnberg Hbf
Preceding station	Nuremberg S-Bahn	Following station
Schnelldorf towards Crailsheim	S4	Leutershausen-Wiedersbach towards Nürnberg Hbf
Location

Dombühl station is a railway station in the municipality of Dombühl, located in the Ansbach district in Middle Franconia, Germany. The station is on the Nuremberg–Crailsheim line of Deutsche Bahn.
