= Großhaslach =

- Ortsteil of Petersaurach
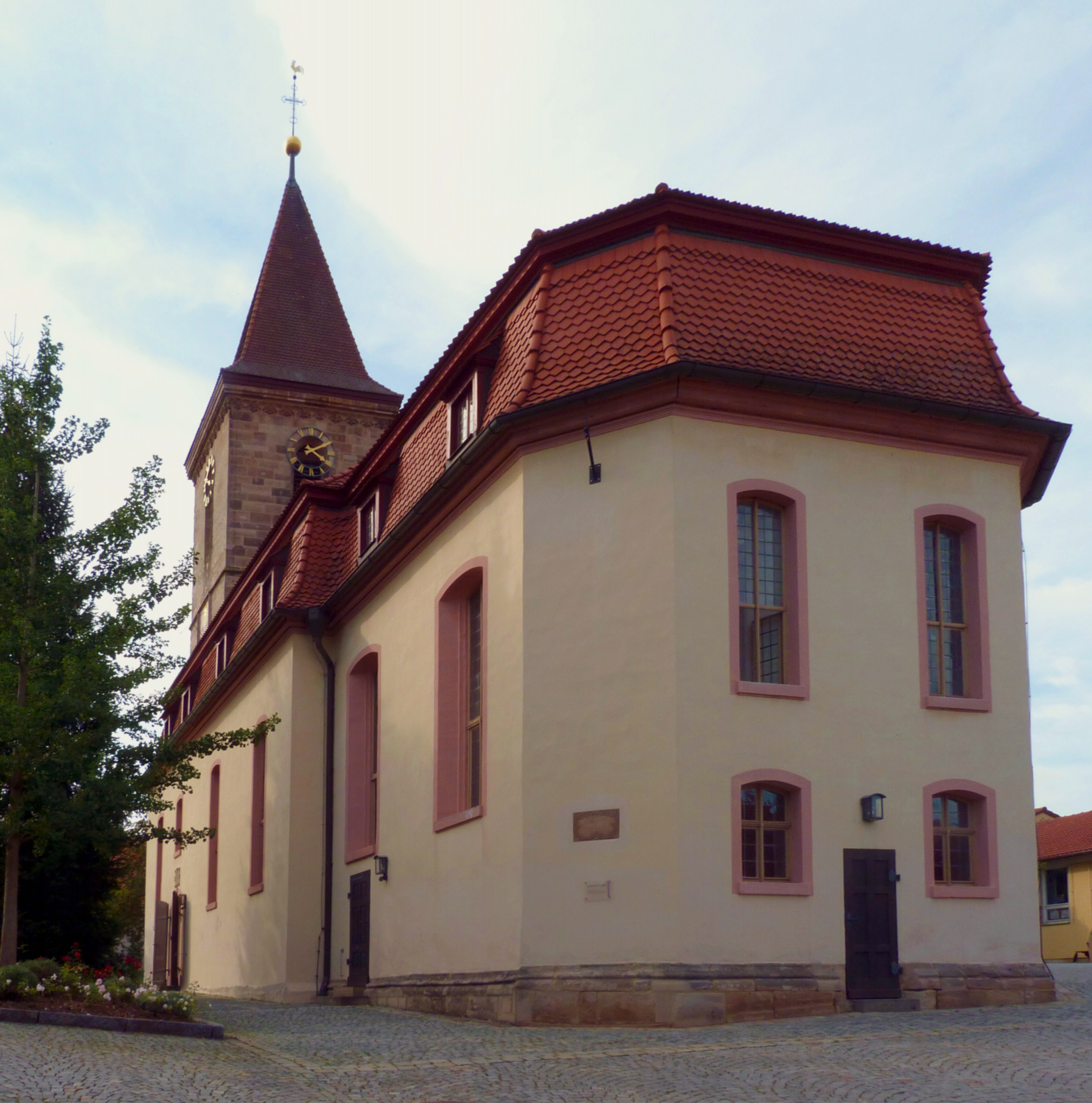
- Church of the Virgin Mary

- Coat of arms
- Interactive map of Großhaslach
- Location within Germany Location within Bavaria
- Coordinates: 49°20′11″N 10°43′44″E
- Country: Germany
- State: Bavaria
- Admin. region: Mittelfranken
- District: Ansbach
- Municipality: Petersaurach
- Elevation: 393 m (1,289 ft)

Population (2009-12-31)
  - Total: 849
- Time zone: UTC+01:00 (CET)
  - Summer (DST): UTC+02:00 (CEST)
- Postal codes: 09872
- Vehicle registration: AN
- Website: www.grosshaslach.de

Großhaslach is a village and a former municipality in the municipality of Petersaurach, in the district of Ansbach, Middle Franconia, Germany.
