= Neuendettelsau station =

Railway station in Germany

Neuendettelsau
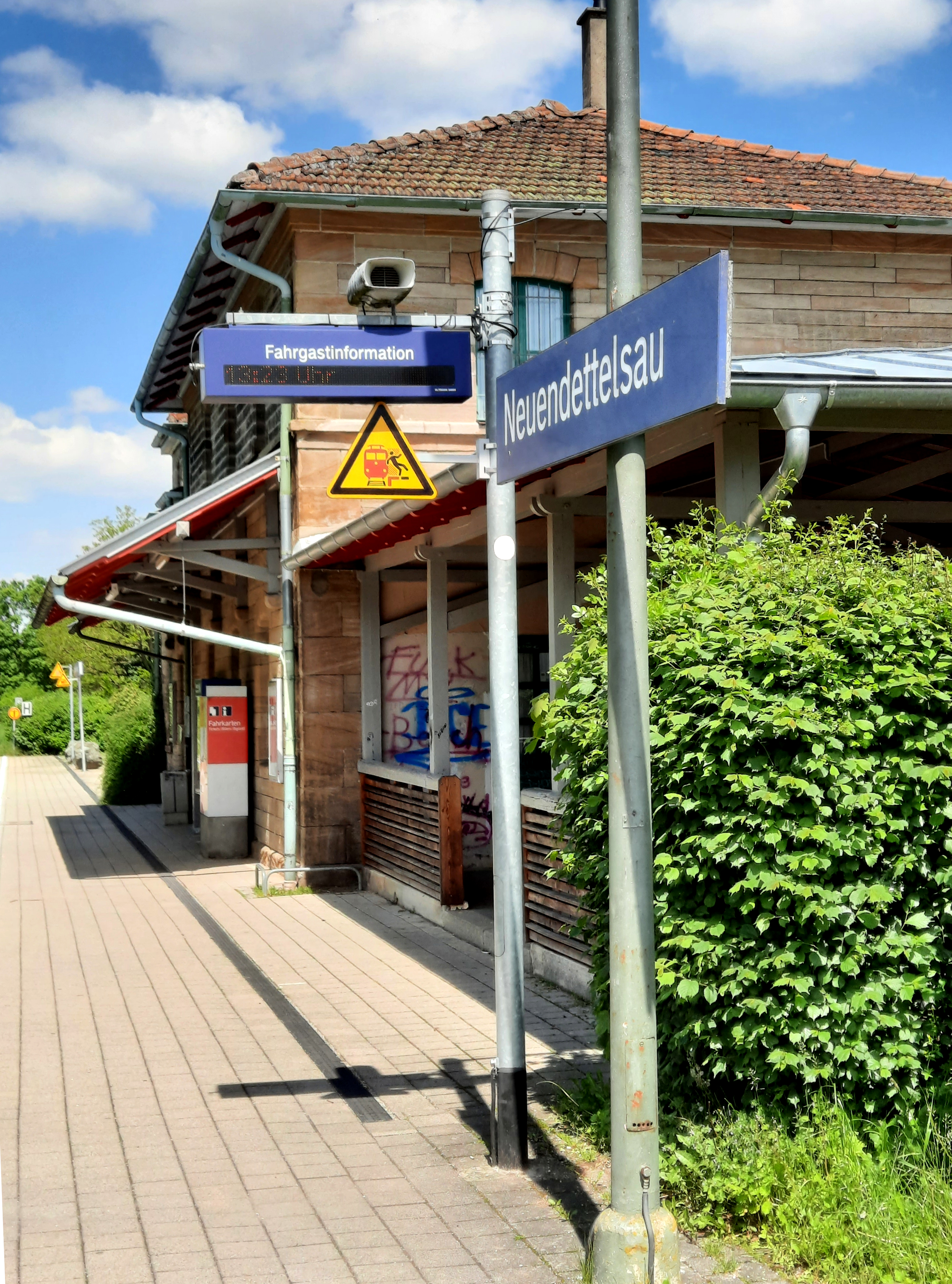
- 2024

General information
- Location: Bahnhofstraße 34; 91564 Neuendettelsau; Bavaria; Germany
- Coordinates: 49.2827°N 10.7825°E
- Owner: DB Netz
- Operator: DB Station&Service
- Line: Wicklesgreuth–Windsbach railway
- Platforms: 1 side platform
- Tracks: 1
- Train operators: DB Regio Bayern

Other information
- Station code: 4378
- DS100 code: NNDU
- IBNR: 8004268
- Category: 7
- Fare zone: VGN: 772 and 781
- Website: www.bahnhof.de

History
- Opened: 1 December 1894; 131 years ago

Services
Preceding station	DB Regio Bayern	Following station
Petersaurach towards Wicklesgreuth	RB 91	Windsbach Terminus
Location
- Location within Bavaria Location within Germany Location within Europe

Neuendettelsau station is a railway station in the municipality of Neuendettelsau, located in the Ansbach district in Middle Franconia, Germany.
