= Nürnberg-Stein station =

Railway halt in Nuremberg, Germany

Nürnberg Stein
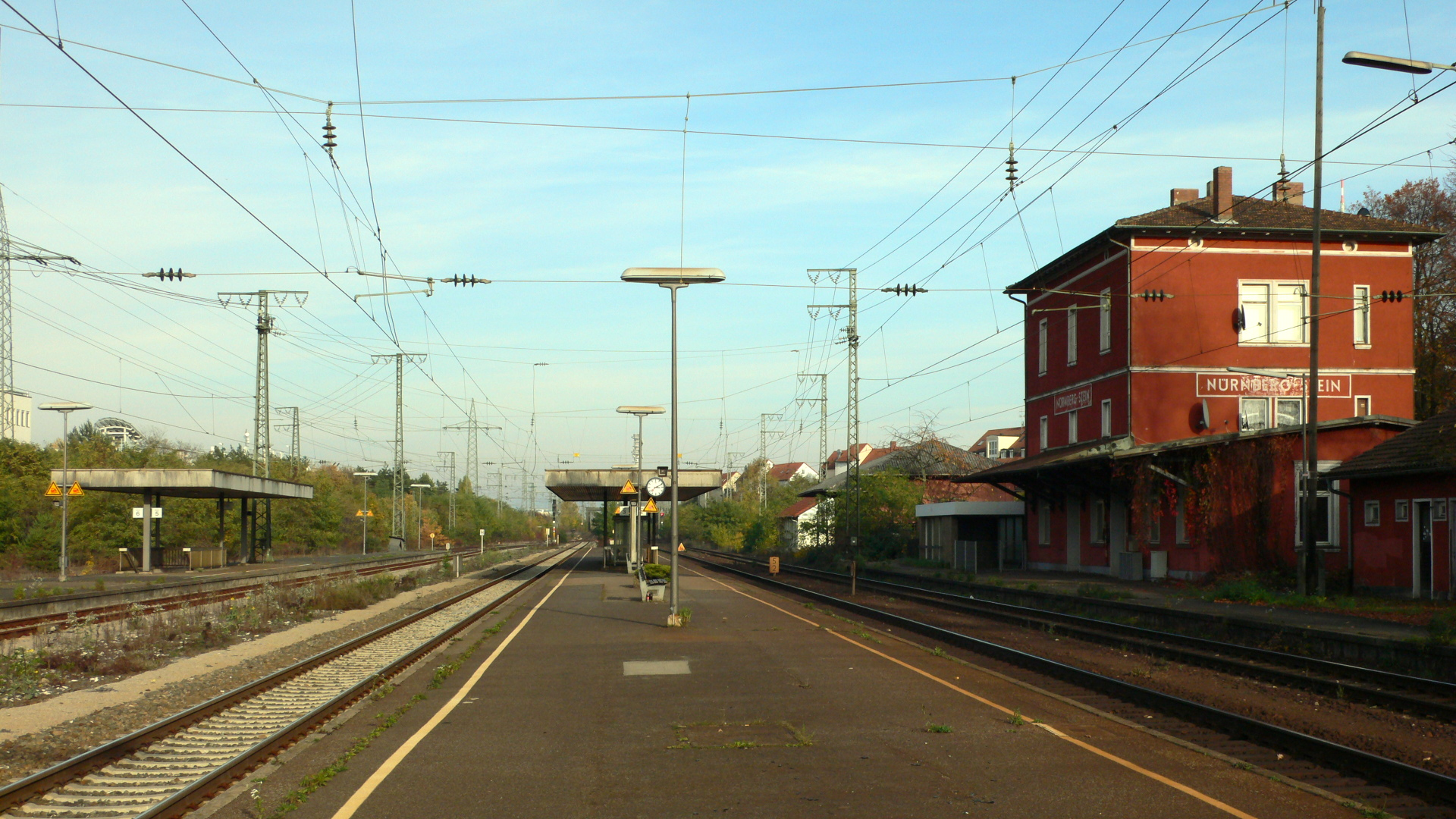
- The station in 2008

General information
- Location: Wörnitzstraße 82; Nuremberg, Bavaria; Germany
- Coordinates: 49°25′32″N 11°01′06″E
- Elevation: 312 m (1,024 ft)
- Owner: DB Netz
- Operator: DB Station&Service
- Lines: Nuremberg–Crailsheim (KBS 786/KBS 890.4)
- Distance: 5.2 km (3.2 mi) from Nürnberg Hbf
- Platforms: 1 island platform; 1 side platform
- Tracks: 3
- Train operators: DB Regio Bayern

Other information
- Station code: 4611
- DS100 code: NNST
- IBNR: 8004486
- Category: 5
- Fare zone: VGN: 200
- Website: www.bahnhof.de

History
- Opened: 15 May 1875

Services
Preceding station	Nuremberg S-Bahn	Following station
Unterasbach towards Crailsheim	S4	Schweinau towards Nürnberg Hbf
Location

Nürnberg-Stein station is a railway station in Nuremberg, Bavaria, Germany. It is served by the Nuremberg suburban train line S4. The station is on the Nuremberg–Crailsheim line of Deutsche Bahn.
