= Gerhard Harig =

German physicist, philosopher and politician

Gerhard Ernst Friedrich Harig (31 July 1902, Niederwürschnitz – 13 October 1966, Leipzig) was a German physicist, Marxist philosopher, professor and statesman who served as the first State Secretary of Higher and Technical Education of the German Democratic Republic.

== Biography ==
Gerhard Harig was born in to the family of a physician. In the 1920s, he studied physics and mathematics, and later on received a doctorate of philosophy in Leipzig. He was an assistant employee at the RWTH Aachen University and was also a member of the Society of the Friends of New Russia.

After the Nazi seizure of power, in March/April 1933, Harig was arrested and detained. Although he was active in the Communist Party of Germany (KPD), he was released in October 1933 and fled to the Soviet Union. He started to work as a researcher at Joffe Institute and later on the Soviet Academy of Sciences. In 1937 he was arrested by the NKVD on accusations of being a German spy; however, he was recruited as a Soviet spy and sent back to Germany. In 1938, he was arrested by the Reich and was held at the Buchenwald concentration camp.

After the end of the Nazi regime, he became head of the statistical office, including the electoral and list office, in Leipzig in November 1945/46. From July 1946 he was the main advisor for philosophy in the Central Secretariat of the Socialist Unity Party in Berlin. In 1948, he received his professorship at the Faculty of Social Sciences of the Leipzig University and was appointed director of the Franz Mehring Institute at the university.

In 1950 he was appointed head of the Main Department for Universities and Scientific Institutions in the Ministry of Popular Education. From March 1951 to 1957 Harig was appointed a member of the Council of Ministers and first State Secretary of the newly established State Secretariat for Higher Education. In 1958, he returned to Karl Marx University and became a professor at the faculty of history of social sciences. In 1960 he was one of the co-founders and editors of the “ NTM series for the history of natural sciences, technology and medicine ”. In 1965 he became the chairman of the National Committee for the History and Philosophy of Science.

== Works ==
- Physik und Renaissance. 2. Aufl. Akademische Verlagsgesellschaft Geest u. Portig, Leipzig 1984.
- Schriften zur Geschichte der Naturwissenschaften. Akademie-Verlag, Berlin 1983.
- Physik und Renaissance. 1. Aufl. Akademische Verlagsgesellschaft Geest u. Portig, Leipzig 1981.
- Ausgewählte philosophische Schriften. Karl-Marx-Univ., Leipzig 1973.
- Die Erkenntnistheorie des Marxismus. 1945.
- Ergebnisse der Volkszählung vom 3. November 1945. Nachrichtenamt d. Stadt, Leipzig 1945.
- Mark M. Rozental: Materialistische und idealistische Weltanschauung. 2. Aufl. Dietz, Berlin 1948.
- Alexander von Humboldt. Urania-Verlag, Leipzig 1959.
- Lenin und die moderne Physik. Leningrad 1934.
- Das Hochschulwesen in der Sowjet-Union. Staatssekretariat f. Hochschulwesen, Berlin 1952.
- Es geht um den Beitrag des deutschen Hochschulwesens und der deutschen Wissenschaft im Kampf um die Erhaltung des Friedens, die Einheit Deutschlands und den planmässigen Aufbau des Sozialismus. Staatssekretariat f. Hochschulwesen, Berlin 1952.
- Über die Verbreiterung der Absorptionslinie 2537 °A. E. des Quecksilbers und Über die Absorption ultravioletten Lichtes durch flüssiges Kohlendioxyd. Leipzig 1929.
- Naturwissenschaft, Tradition, Fortschritt. Dt. Verlag d. Wissenschaften, Berlin 1963.
- Wilhelm Ostwald: Volumchemische Studien über Affinität. Akademische Verlagsges. Geest u. Portig, Leipzig 1966.
- Von Adam Ries bis Max Planck. Verlag Enzyklopädie, Leipzig 1961.
- Naturwissenschaft und Philosophie. Akademie-Verlag, Berlin 1960.
- Lehre, Forschung, Praxis. Teubner (in Verwaltung), Leipzig 1963.
- Alexander von Humboldt. 2., verb. Aufl. Urania-Verlag, Leipzig 1964.
- Wesen und Entstehung der marxistischen Philosophie. Verlag Enzyklopädie, Leipzig 1958.
- Die Tat des Kopernikus, Leipzig. 2., überarb. Aufl. Urania-Verlag, Leipzig 1965.
- Die Tat des Kopernikus, Leipzig. Urania Verlag, Leipzig 1962.
- Dialektischer Materialismus und moderne Naturwissenschaft. Verlag Enzyklopädie, Leipzig 1960.
- Bedeutende Gelehrte in Leipzig. Bd. 2.1965.
- Die Entwicklung der Wissenschaft zur unmittelbaren Produktivkraft. Karl-Marx-Universität, Leipzig 1963.
- Sowjetische Beiträge zur Geschichte der Naturwissenschaft. Verlag d. Wissenschaften, Berlin 1960.
- Die Erziehung unserer Studierenden im gesellschaftswissenschaftlichen Grundstudium. Verlag Junge Welt, Berlin 1954.
- Leipziger Vorträge der Arbeitsgemeinschaft marxistischer Wissenschaftler. Bibliographisches Institut.
- Von Adam Ries bis Max Planck. 2., (durchges.) Aufl. Verlag Enzyklopädie, Leipzig 1962.
