= Windsbach station =

Railway station in Germany

Windsbach

General information
- Location: Bahnhofstraße 26; 91575 Windsbach; Bavaria; Germany
- Coordinates: 49.2497°N 10.8256°E
- Owner: DB Netz
- Operator: DB Station&Service
- Line: Wicklesgreuth–Windsbach railway
- Platforms: 1 side platform
- Tracks: 1
- Train operators: DB Regio Bayern

Other information
- Station code: 6795
- DS100 code: NWIN
- IBNR: 8006473
- Category: 7
- Fare zone: VGN: 781 and 784
- Website: www.bahnhof.de

History
- Opened: 1 December 1894; 131 years ago

Services
Preceding station	DB Regio Bayern	Following station
Neuendettelsau towards Wicklesgreuth	RB 91	Terminus
Location
- Location within Bavaria Location within Germany Location within Europe

Windsbach station is a railway station in the municipality of Windsbach, located in the Ansbach district in Middle Franconia, Germany.
