= Niederwürschnitz =

- Municipality
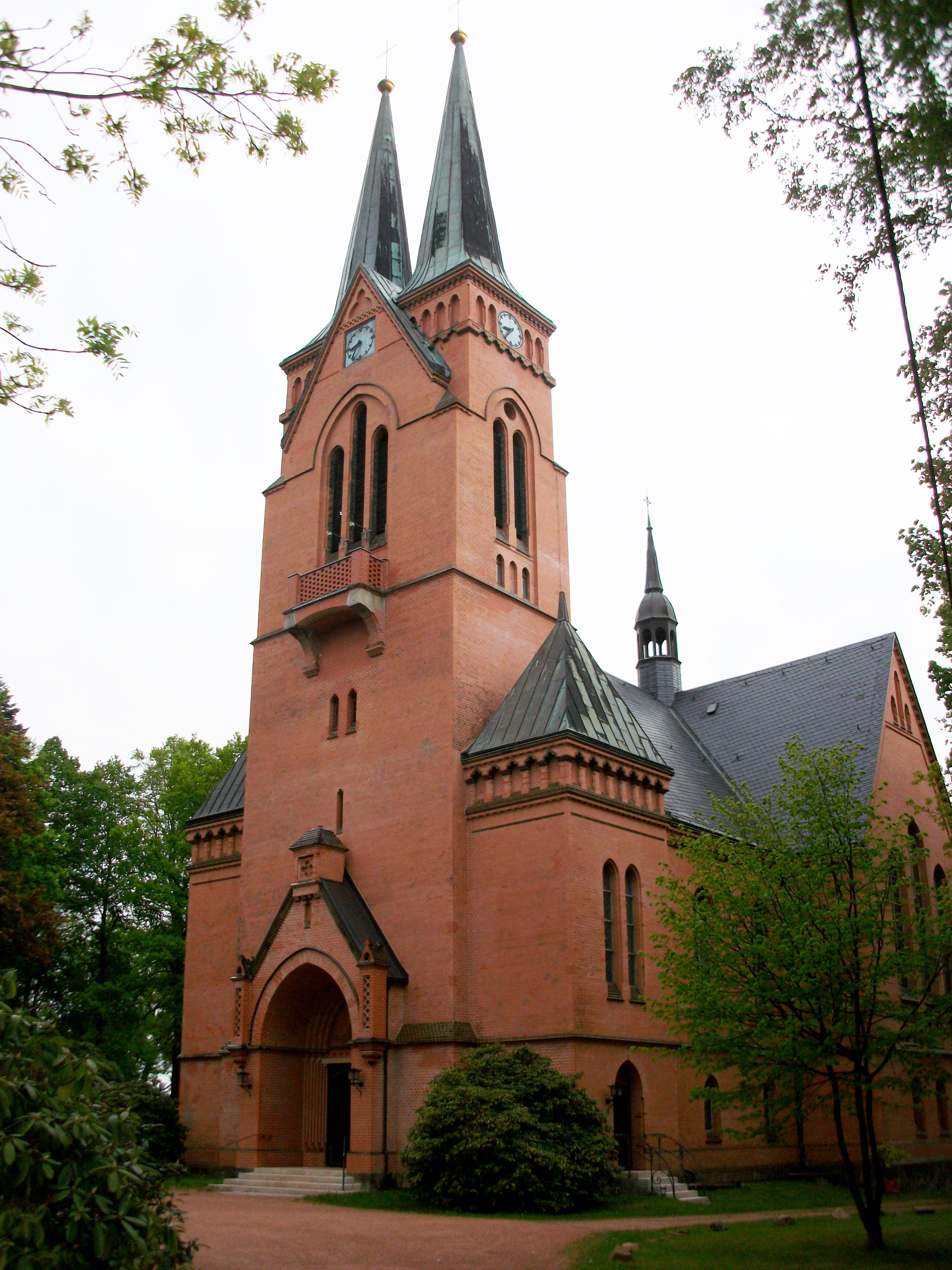
- Church of Saint John

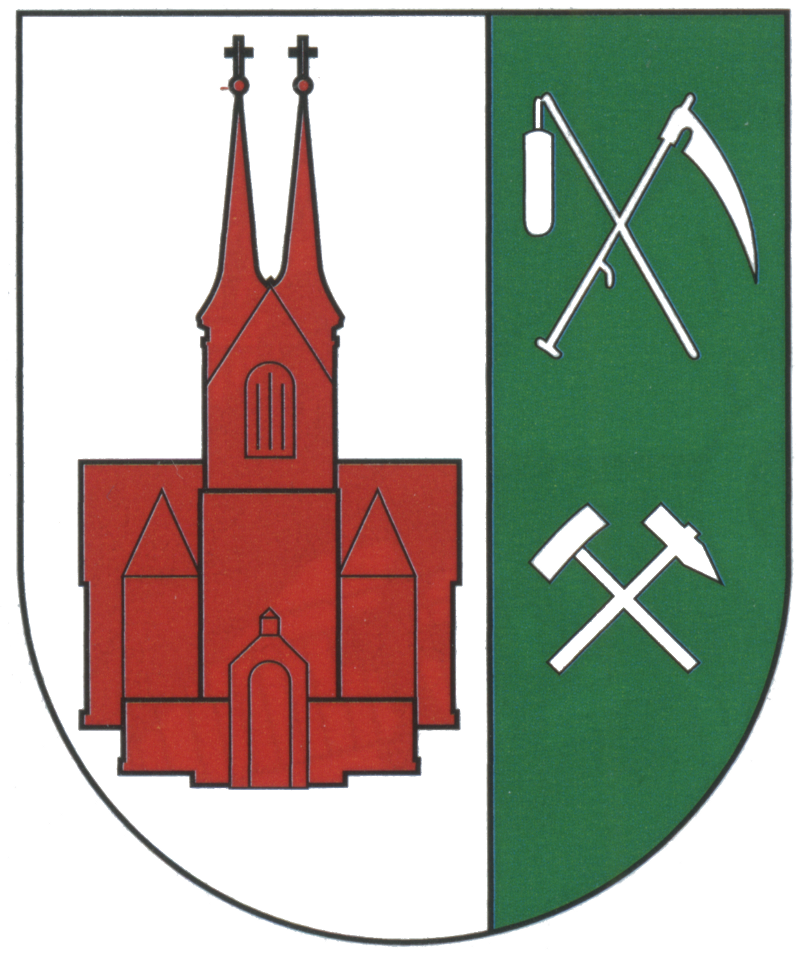
- Coat of arms

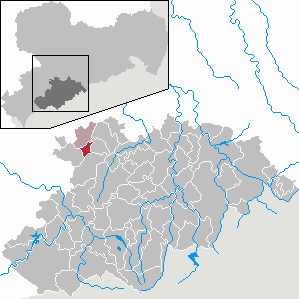
- Location of Niederwürschnitz within Erzgebirgskreis district
- Interactive map of Niederwürschnitz
- Location within Germany Location within Saxony
- Coordinates: 50°43′19″N 12°45′18″E
- Country: Germany
- State: Saxony
- District: Erzgebirgskreis

Government
  - Mayor (2017–24): Matthias Anton

Area
  - Total: 6.06 km^{2} (2.34 sq mi)
- Elevation: 420 m (1,380 ft)

Population (2025-12-31)
  - Total: 2,496
  - Density: 412/km^{2} (1,070/sq mi)
- Time zone: UTC+01:00 (CET)
  - Summer (DST): UTC+02:00 (CEST)
- Postal codes: 09399
- Dialling codes: 037296
- Vehicle registration: ERZ, ANA, ASZ, AU, MAB, MEK, STL, SZB, ZP

Niederwürschnitz is a municipality in the district Erzgebirgskreis, in Saxony, Germany.

== Notable people linked to Niederwürschnitz ==
- Gerhard Harig, (1902-1966) physicist
