= Sachsen bei Ansbach =

- Municipality
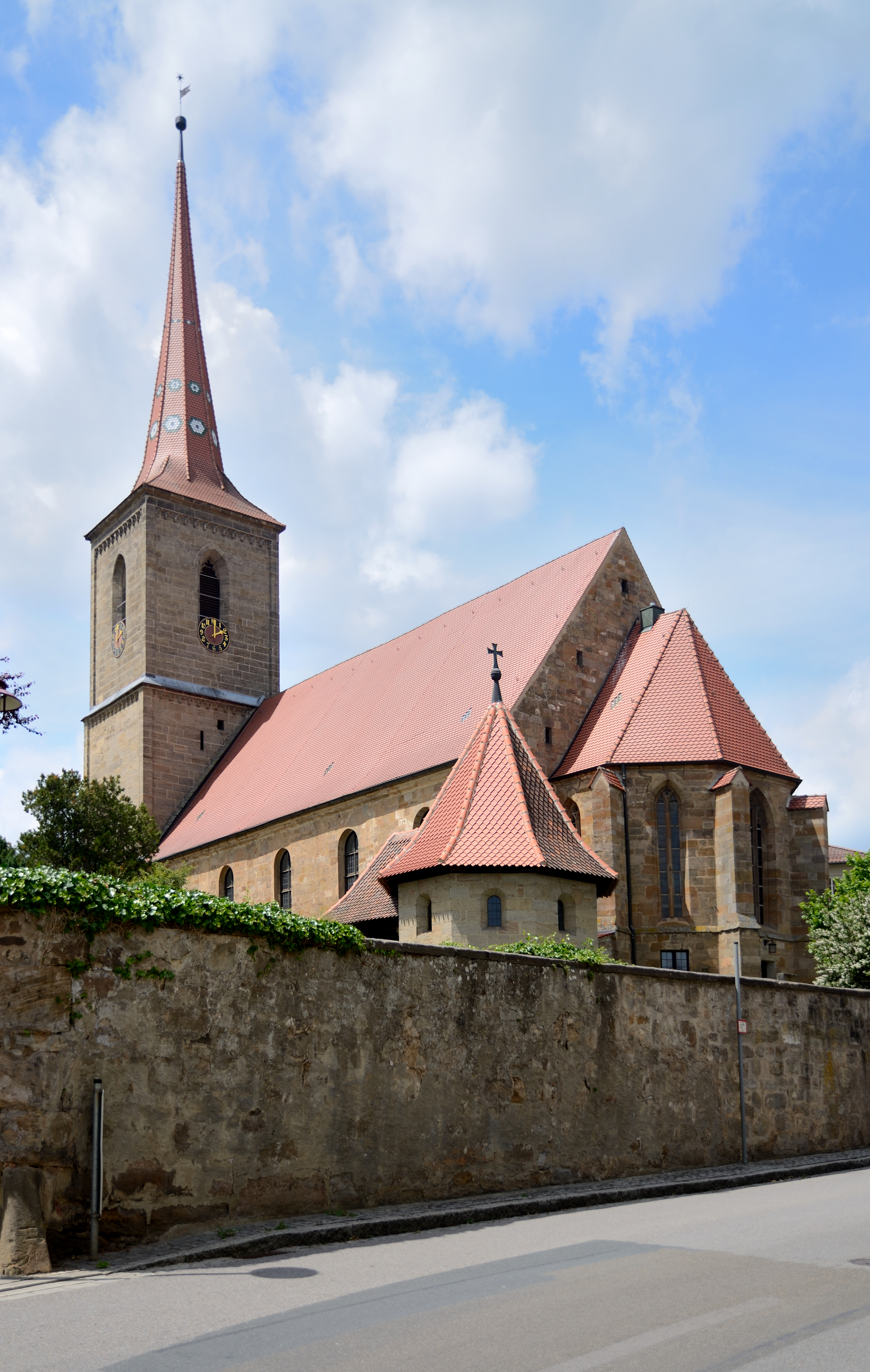
- Church of Saint Alban

- Coat of arms

- Location of Sachsen bei Ansbach within Ansbach district
- Interactive map of Sachsen bei Ansbach
- Location within Germany Location within Bavaria
- Coordinates: 49°17′N 10°39′E
- Country: Germany
- State: Bavaria
- Admin. region: Mittelfranken
- District: Ansbach
- Subdivisions: 12 Ortsteile

Government
  - Mayor (2020–26): Bernd Meyer (CSU)

Area
  - Total: 20.94 km^{2} (8.08 sq mi)
- Elevation: 412 m (1,352 ft)

Population (2025-12-31)
  - Total: 3,700
  - Density: 180/km^{2} (460/sq mi)
- Time zone: UTC+01:00 (CET)
  - Summer (DST): UTC+02:00 (CEST)
- Postal codes: 91623
- Dialling codes: 09827
- Vehicle registration: AN
- Website: www.sachsen-b-ansbach.de

Sachsen bei Ansbach (German pronunciation: [ˈzaksn̩ baɪ ˈʔansbax], lit. 'Sachsen near Ansbach') is a municipality in the district of Ansbach in Bavaria in Germany.
