= Oberasbach =

- Town
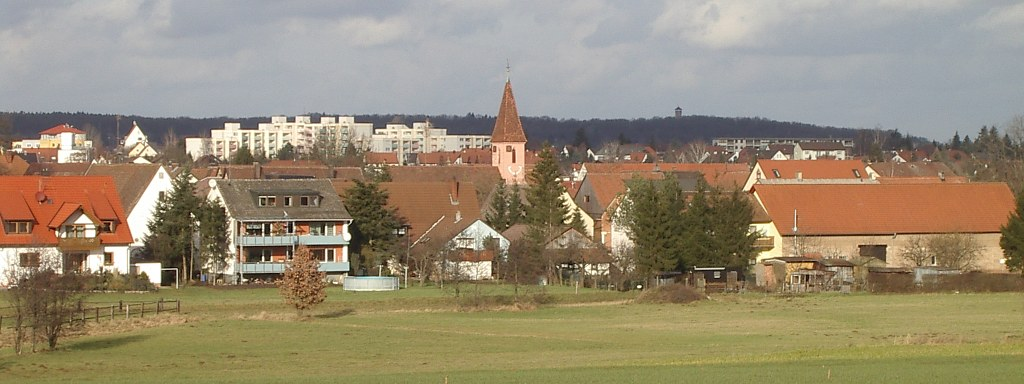
- Oberasbach seen from the southwest

- Coat of arms

- Location of Oberasbach within Fürth district
- Interactive map of Oberasbach
- Location within Germany Location within Bavaria
- Coordinates: 49°25′19″N 10°57′30″E
- Country: Germany
- State: Bavaria
- Admin. region: Mittelfranken
- District: Fürth
- Subdivisions: 7 Stadtteile

Government
  - Mayor (2020–26): Birgit Huber (CSU)

Area
  - Total: 12.08 km^{2} (4.66 sq mi)
- Elevation: 291–351 m (955–1,152 ft)

Population (2025-12-31)
  - Total: 17,678
  - Density: 1,463/km^{2} (3,790/sq mi)
- Time zone: UTC+01:00 (CET)
  - Summer (DST): UTC+02:00 (CEST)
- Postal codes: 90522
- Dialling codes: 0911
- Vehicle registration: FÜ
- Website: www.oberasbach.de

Oberasbach (German pronunciation: [oːbɐˈʔasbax]; East Franconian: Aschbach) is a municipality in the district of Fürth, in Bavaria, Germany. It is situated 6 km southwest of Fürth, and 10 km west of Nuremberg (centre).

== Stadtrat ==
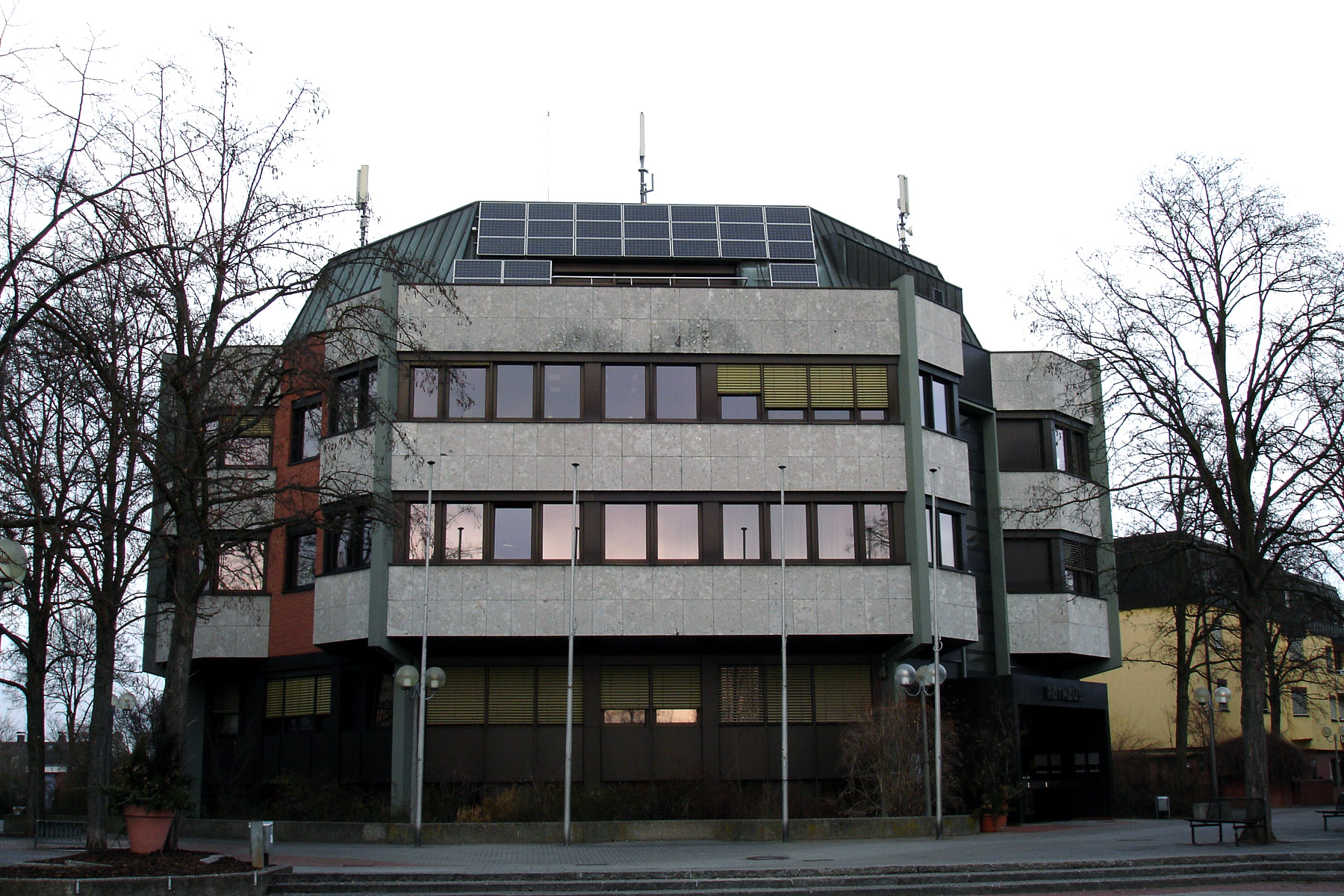
Oberasbach town hall

The local council has 24 members. The election in 2020 showed the following results:

- 9 seats (CSU)
- 4 seats (The Greens)
- 3 seats (Free voters)
- 3 seats (SPD)
- 2 seats (BI Oberasbach)
- 1 seat (AfD)
- 1 seat (FDP)
- 1 seat (The Left)

== Twin towns ==
Oberasbach is twinned with:

- Niederwürschnitz, Germany
- Oława, Poland
- Riolo Terme, Italy

== Personalities ==
- Steffen Weinhold, (born 1986), handball player
- Deniz Aytekin, (born 1978), football referee
- Maurice Müller, (born 1992), soccer player

== See also ==
- Media related to Oberasbach at Wikimedia Commons
