= Wicklesgreuth–Windsbach railway =

Wicklesgreuth–Windsbach
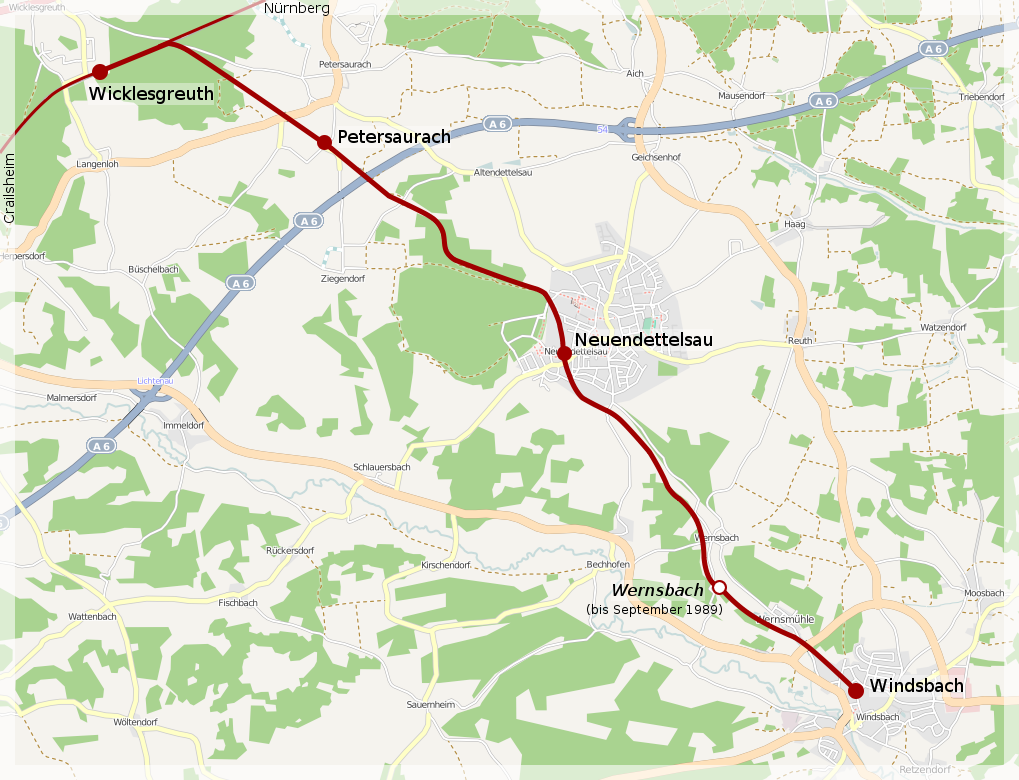

Overview
- Line number: 5253

Service
- Route number: 922

Technical
- Line length: 11.8 km
- Track gauge: 1435 mm

The Wicklesgreuth–Windsbach railway is an 11.8 kilometre long branch line, that branches off at Wicklesgreuth from the Nuremberg–Crailsheim railway.

It was opened on 1 December 1894. Since 27 September 1987 the line has been integrated into the Nuremberg Regional Transport Union (Verkehrsverbund Grossraum Nürnberg) as Regionalbahn route number R71.

Passenger traffic is served today by diesel multiple units of DBAG Class 642, that run every 60 minutes Monday to Friday and every 120 minutes at the weekend. Goods services are no longer operated.

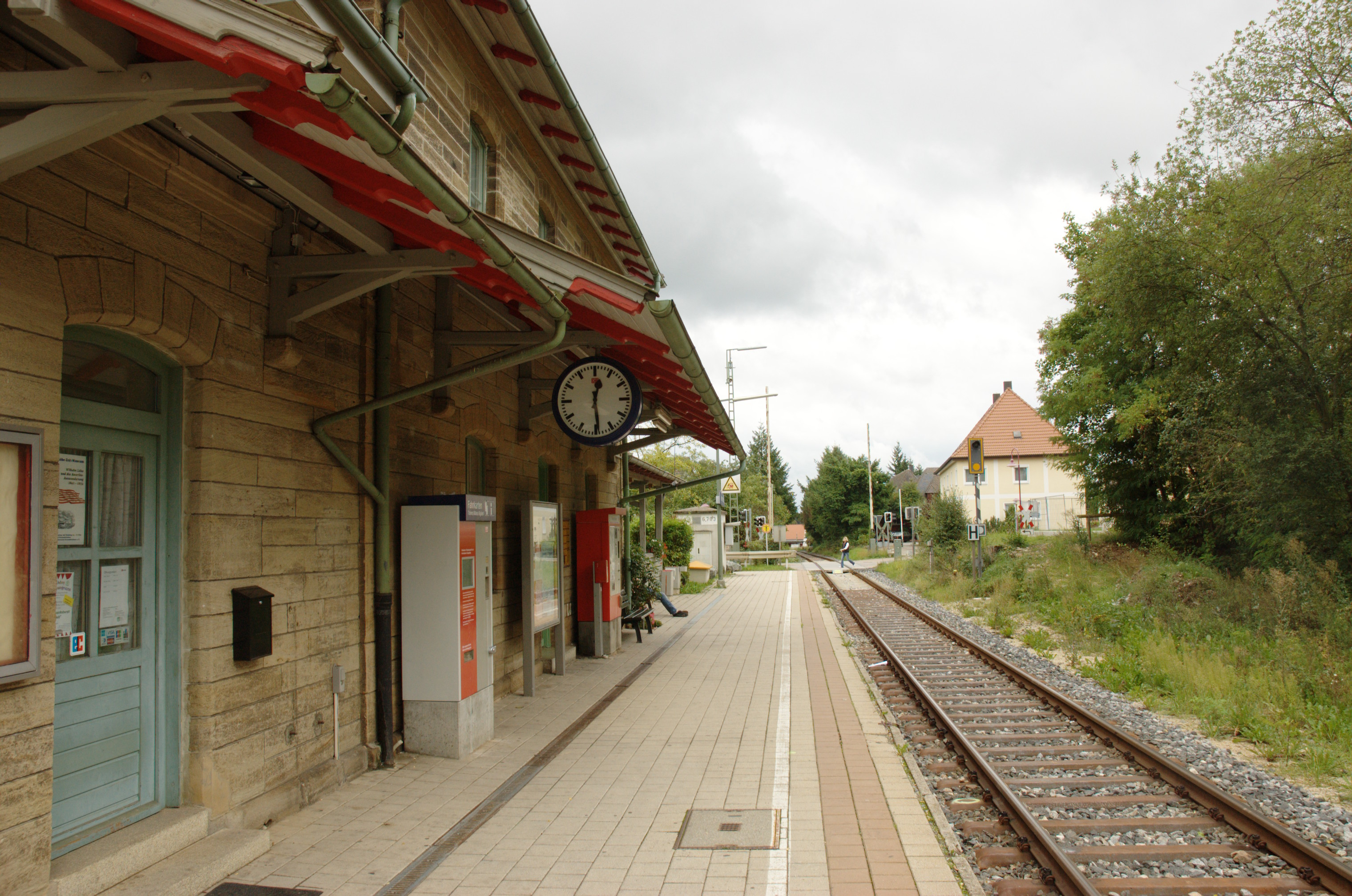
Neuendettelsau station
