= Roßtal =

Market town in Bavaria

- Municipality
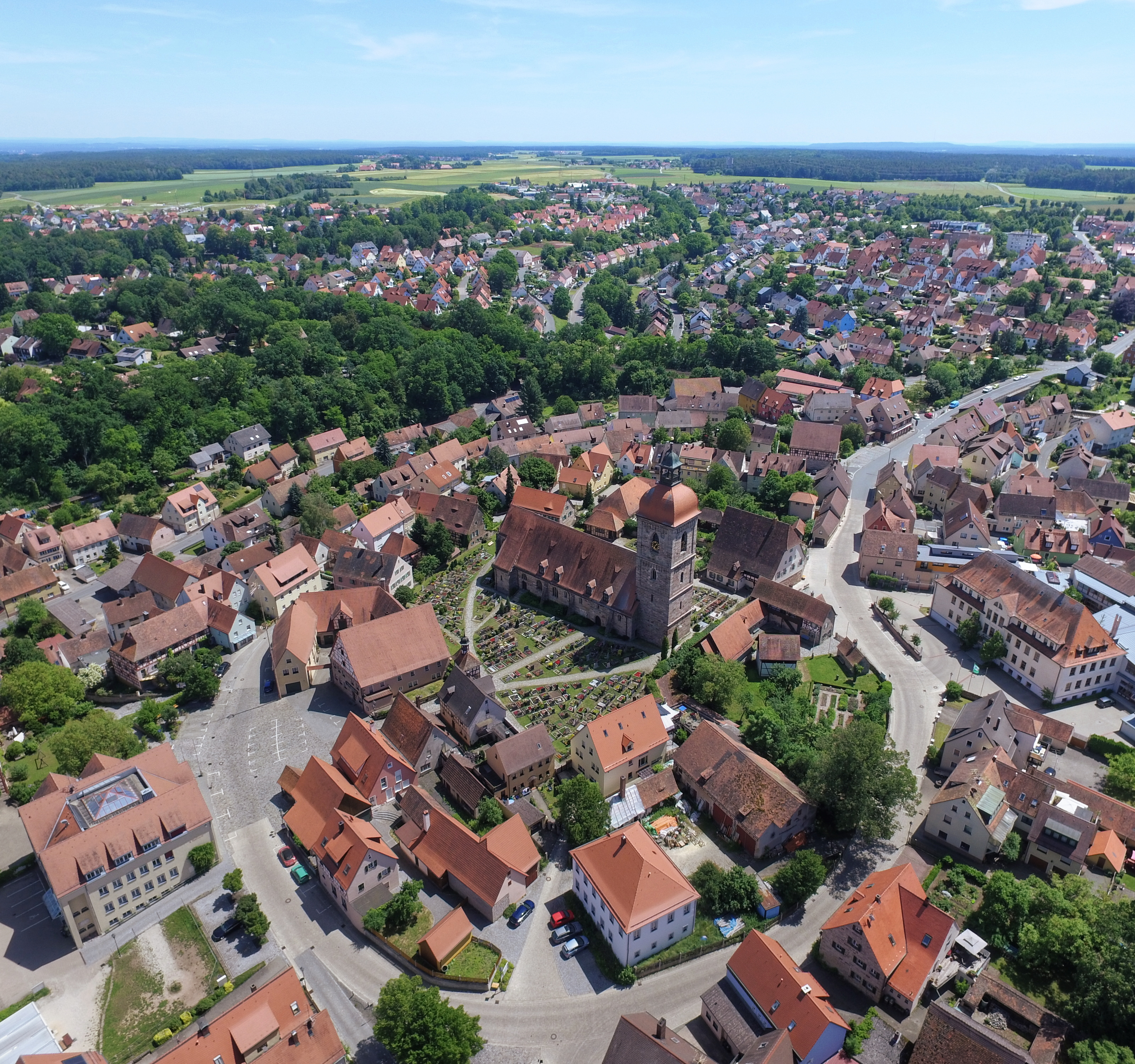
- Town center of Roßtal with the Church of Saint Lawrence

- Coat of arms

- Location of Roßtal within Fürth district
- Interactive map of Roßtal
- Location within Germany Location within Bavaria
- Coordinates: 49°24′N 10°53′E
- Country: Germany
- State: Bavaria
- Admin. region: Mittelfranken
- District: Fürth
- Subdivisions: 17 Ortsteile

Government
  - Mayor (2020–26): Rainer Gegner (SPD)

Area
  - Total: 44.40 km^{2} (17.14 sq mi)
- Elevation: 373 m (1,224 ft)

Population (2025-12-31)
  - Total: 9,626
  - Density: 216.8/km^{2} (561.5/sq mi)
- Time zone: UTC+01:00 (CET)
  - Summer (DST): UTC+02:00 (CEST)
- Postal codes: 90574
- Dialling codes: 09127
- Vehicle registration: FÜ
- Website: www.rosstal.de

Roßtal is a market town in the district of Fürth, Bavaria, Germany. It has a population of 9,739 as of 2023. It has a primary school and a secondary school. The church is named St. Laurentius and was built from 1025 to 1042. Roßtal is surrounded by forests, made accessible via many hiking and biking trails. Roßtal has trainlinks to Nuremberg and Ansbach which run three times an hour.

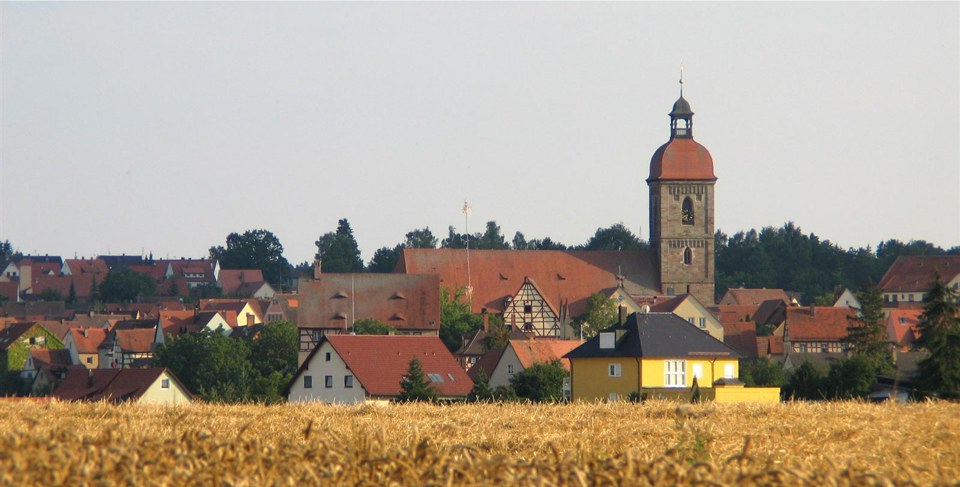
St. Lawrence Church in Roßtal
