= Petersaurach =

- Municipality
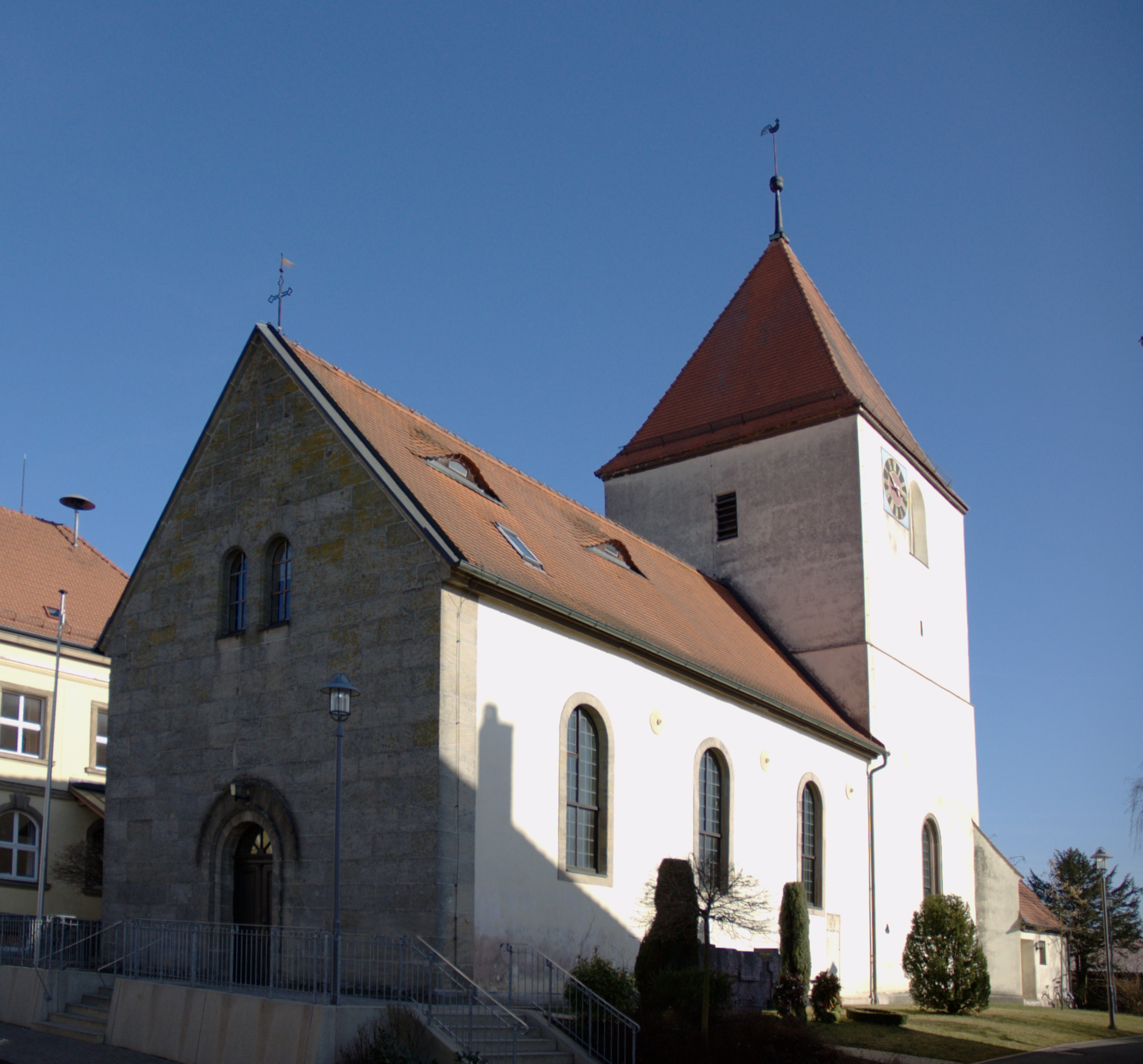
- Church of Saint Peter

- Coat of arms

- Location of Petersaurach within Ansbach district
- Interactive map of Petersaurach
- Location within Germany Location within Bavaria
- Coordinates: 49°17′N 10°45′E
- Country: Germany
- State: Bavaria
- Admin. region: Mittelfranken
- District: Ansbach
- Subdivisions: 16 Ortsteile

Government
  - Mayor (2020–26): Herbert Albrecht (CSU)

Area
  - Total: 41.81 km^{2} (16.14 sq mi)
- Elevation: 442 m (1,450 ft)

Population (2025-12-31)
  - Total: 4,949
  - Density: 118.4/km^{2} (306.6/sq mi)
- Time zone: UTC+01:00 (CET)
  - Summer (DST): UTC+02:00 (CEST)
- Postal codes: 91580
- Dialling codes: 0 98 72
- Vehicle registration: AN
- Website: www.petersaurach.de

Petersaurach (German pronunciation: [ˈpeːtɐsˌʔaʊʁax]) is a municipality in the district of Ansbach in Bavaria in Germany.
