= Nuremberg–Crailsheim railway =

Railway line in Bavaria and Baden-Württemberg, Germany

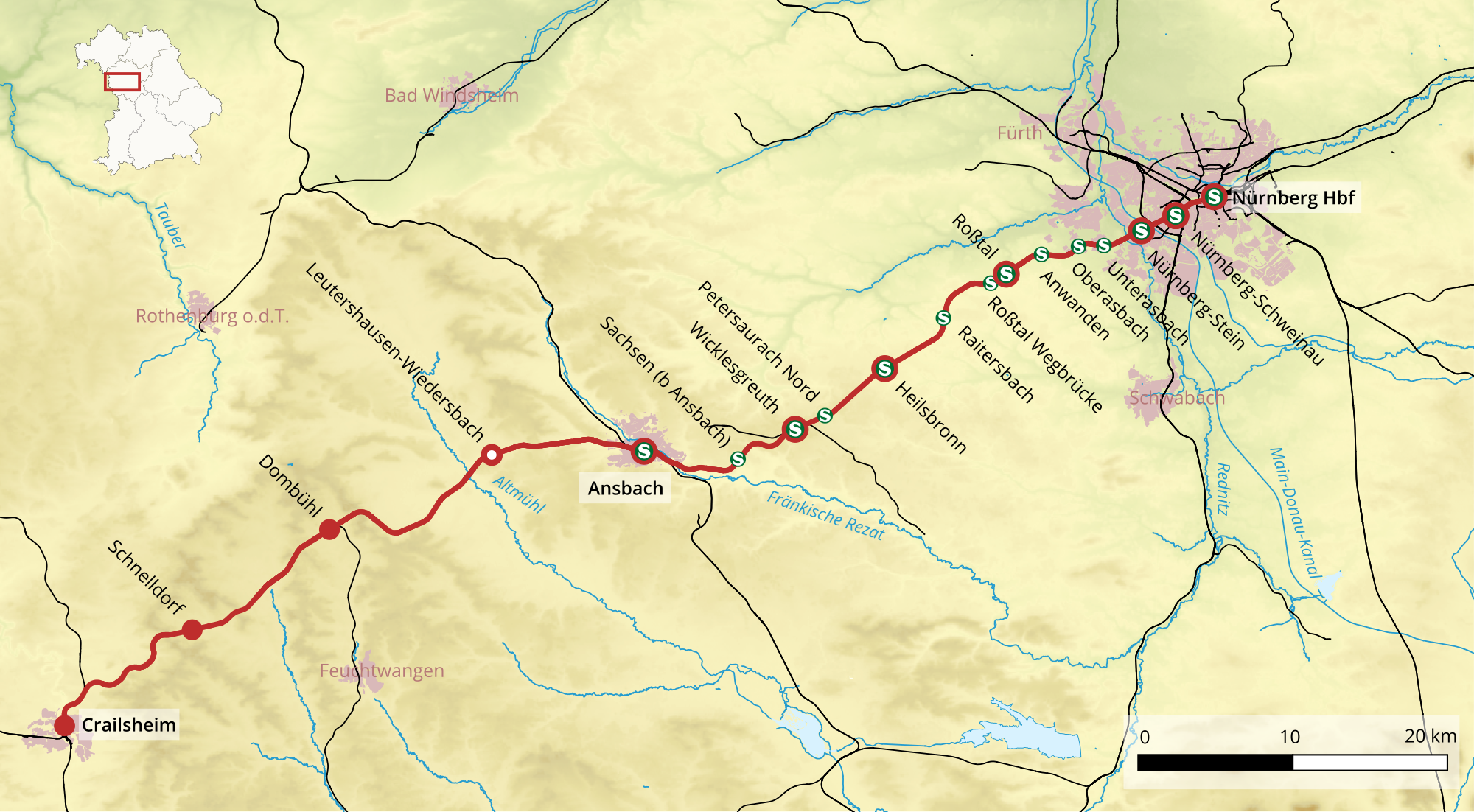

Overview
- Native name: Bahnstrecke Nürnberg - Craisheim
- Status: Operational
- Owner: Deutsche Bahn
- Line number: 5902 (Nürnberg Hbf – Schnelldorf); 4951 (Ellrichshausen – Crailsheim)
- Locale: Bavaria and Baden-Württemberg, Germany
- Termini: Nuremberg Hbf.; Crailsheim
- Stations: 16

Service
- Type: Heavy rail, Passenger/freight rail Regional rail, Commuter rail, Intercity rail
- Route number: 786, 890.4
- Operator(s): DB Bahn

History
- Opened: Stages between 1875-1876

Technical
- Line length: 90.4 km (56.2 mi)
- Number of tracks: Double track
- Track gauge: 1,435 mm (4 ft 8 1/2 in) standard gauge
- Electrification: 15 kV/16.7 Hz AC overhead
- Operating speed: 160 km/h (99 mph)

The Nuremberg–Crailsheim railway is a major railway in the north of the German states of Bavaria and Baden-Württemberg, which links Nuremberg, Ansbach and Crailsheim. The line has the current timetable number of 891.7 and is an important German railway line. The Nuremberg–Ansbach section is used as an alternative route when problems occur for long-distance services between Nuremberg and Würzburg (via Uffenheim) and Nuremberg and Treuchtlingen (via Gunzenhausen) and to relieve the Nuremberg–Würzburg railway of some of its freight traffic.

== History ==
A Bavarian politician, Gustav von Schlör advocated the planning of the line in 1862 during a tour of the route via Fürth and Zirndorf to Crailsheim. On 15 May 1875, the Royal Bavarian State Railways (Königlich Bayerische Staats-Eisenbahnen) opened the Nuremberg–Ansbach section on a direct route, as the industrialist Lothar von Faber had succeeded in having the route of the line moved closer to his factories in Stein. On 15 June 1875, the line was extended to Dombühl and, on 15 April 1876, to Crailsheim in Württemberg. Due to the ever-growing traffic, the line between Nuremberg and the border was duplicated by 1888. On 19 May 1972, electrification was completed between Nuremberg and Ansbach and, on 19 May 1985, electrification was extended from Crailsheim to Goldshöfe.

On 12 December 2010, operations of line S4 of the Nuremberg S-Bahn network was extended from Nuremberg to Ansbach. For this extension, all intermediate S-Bahn stations were upgraded to provide barrier-free access for the disabled, with the exception of Oberasbach, where planning for the redevelopment had not yet been completed. An additional station at Petersaurach Nord, located between Heilsbronn and Wicklesgreuth, was opened on 12 September 2014. The S-Bahn extension to Dombühl via the reopened Leutershausen-Wiedersbach station, but without its former passing loop, opened in December 2017 and is served every two hours.

== Route ==
The line leaves Nuremberg Hauptbahnhof to the west, initially running parallel with the lines to Bamberg and to Augsburg. The line crosses the Frankenschnellweg freeway and the connecting tracks to the former main freight yard and the cattle yard and passes through Schweinau, Schweinau station and the industrial area of Tillypark. It then crosses the Ring line (Ringbahn), the Südwesttangente ("South-west tangent" freeway) and the Main–Danube Canal and reaches Nürnberg-Stein station, where the Bibert Railway (Bibertbahn) branched off to Unternbibert-Rügland until 1986. After the line crosses the Rednitz river, it runs through Unterasbach and Oberasbach and continues between the Bibert river to the north and federal highway B14 to the south through Roßtal and Heilsbronn to Wicklesgreuth. There a branch line runs to Windsbach and a siding runs to the United States Army military base at Katterbach. Near Lichtenau forest, the line continues to Sachsen bei Ansbach and from there runs parallel with the Fränkische Rezat and from the Ansbach district of Eyb it runs next to the railway line from Treuchtlingen to Ansbach station.

After the station, the line to Würzburg branches off to the northwest, while the line to Crailsheim turns to the southwest to Leutershausen-Wiedersbach, running along the southern edge of Frankenhöhe (a highland). In Eichholz, the line bends to avoid the Rüsselholz (a forest) and runs to the north west after a left turn between the forest and the Klosterberg (a mountain) runs to the former railway station of Dombühl. This was the starting point of a line to Rothenburg and Steinach and is still the starting point of for the line to Nördlingen, which is now only used for freight and museum excursions. The line continues under the A 7 and A 66 autobahns, through Schnelldorf station to the Bavaria/ Baden-Württemberg border, connects near Beuerlbach with the Tauber Valley Railway (Taubertalbahn) and ends in Crailsheim station.

=== Construction standards ===
The route is double track and electrified throughout. The line speed between Ansbach and Nuremberg Hauptbahnhof is between 120 and 160 km/h. Regional traffic between Roßtal-Wegbrücke and the change of tracks Roßtal is restricted to 60 km/h. In addition the stations of Nürnberg-Stein, Roßtal, Wicklesgreuth, Ansbach and Dombühl are equipped with overtaking tracks.

=== Stations ===
The refurbished goods shed of the former station in Ellrichshausen was one of five winners of the Peter-Haag Prize (for the preservation of Baden-Württemberg rail heritage) in 1989. The shed was built by Georg von Morlok in 1874 and now houses a private automotive museum.

=== Transport networks ===
The Nuremberg–Schnelldorf section is served by Regionalbahn line R7 and is integrated into the Verkehrsverbund Großraum Nürnberg (Greater Nuremberg Transport Association, VGN).

== Operations ==
In long-distance traffic, InterCity trains runs on the Nuremberg–Stuttgart–Karlsruhe route. From the end of 2017, double-deck Intercity sets have been used for long-distance traffic between Nuremberg and Karlsruhe.

In regional traffic, Regional-Express services on the Nuremberg–Crailsheim–Stuttgart route were previously formed of Class 111electric locomotives and Silberling carriages as push-pull trains. In order to avoid capacity bottlenecks, the Silberling carriages were replaced by double-decker wagons with high entrances at the beginning of 2017. The trains of the Nuremberg S-Bahn, which operate between Nuremberg and Dombühl, are operated with class 442 (Bombardier Talent 2) electric multiple units.

== S-Bahn extension from Ansbach to Dombühl ==
On 7 October 2009 the Bavarian Ministry of Transport and the Deutsche Bahn signed an agreement to plan to extension of line S4 of the S-Bahn from Ansbach to Dombühl. Construction of the €5 million project, including the adaptation of the line and signalling and the reopening of Leutershausen-Wiedersbach station, was originally planned to be completed in December 2013, but was delayed until the end of 2017.

In the contract for the Nuremberg S-Bahn for the period from December 2017 to December 2029, which was advertised at the end of 2013, the extension of the S-Bahn beyond Ansbach to Dombühl at two-hour intervals was considered. It was not until June 2016 that an agreement was reached on the infrastructure upgrade needed for the 23 km extension. Of the costs of €5.5 million, the state of Bavaria will fund €2.2 million and also contribute to the planning costs. With a symbolic groundbreaking ceremony, construction work was started on 23 March 2017. The two-hour extension of the S-Bahn service requires an extra 170,000 train-kilometres per year to be operated.
