= S4 (Nuremberg) =

Overview
- Locale: Nuremberg

Service
- Type: Rapid transit
- System: Nuremberg S-Bahn
- Operator(s): DB Regio Franken
- Rolling stock: Bombardier Talent 2

The S4 is an S-Bahn service in the German city of Nuremberg. It is one of the five services of the Nuremberg S-Bahn network. It was opened in 2010 and has 16 stations. The route is 67.1 km (41.7 mi) long and runs from Nürnberg Hauptbahnhof to Dombühl. Until 9 December 2017 the western terminus was Ansbach. The extension to Dombühl was opened the day after.

== Future extensions ==
In December 2020 the ministers of transportation for Baden Württemberg and Bayern announced their intention to extend the S4 from its current endpoint at Dombühl across the state line to Crailsheim with a proposed entry into service 2024.

== Network ==
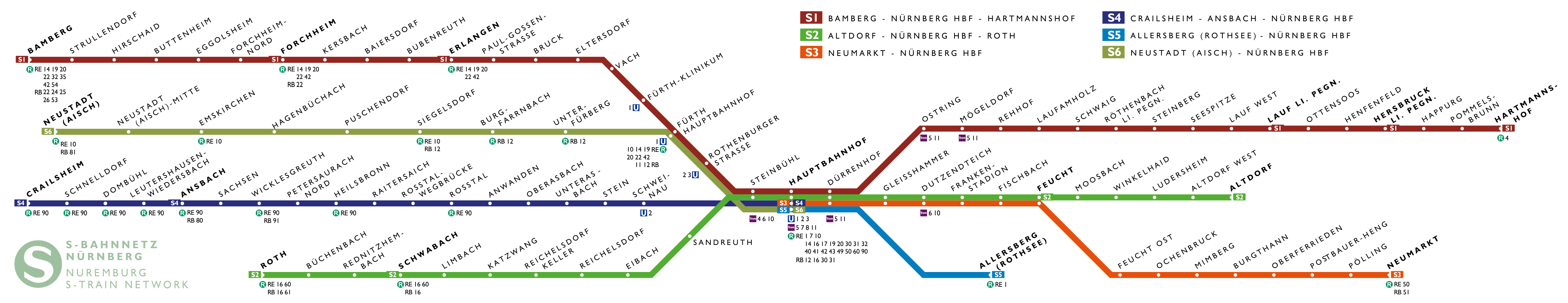
S-Bahn network map (as of Dezember 2017)
