= Glonn =

- Municipality
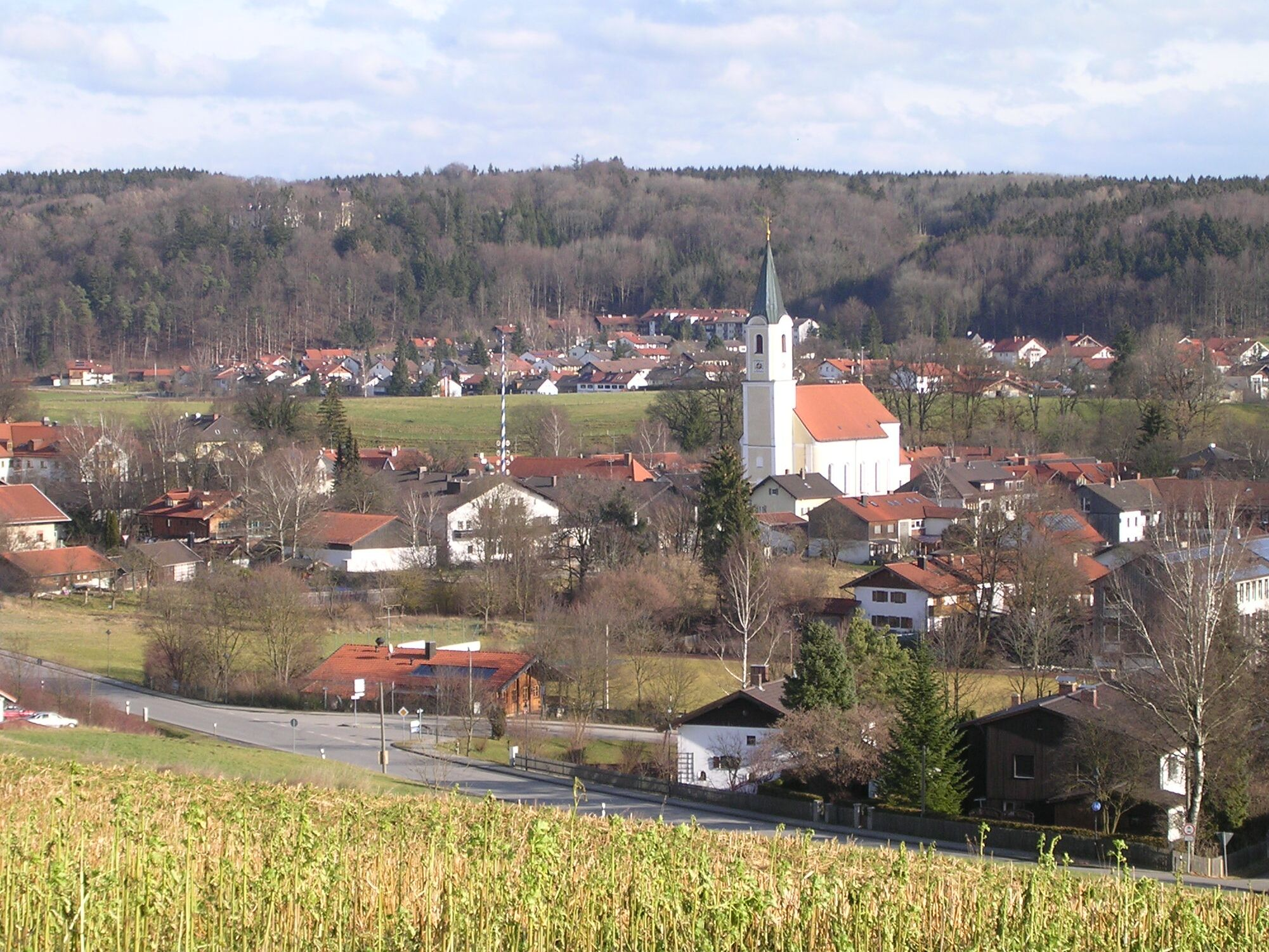
- View of Glonn from the southwest

- Coat of arms

- Location of Glonn within Ebersberg district
- Interactive map of Glonn
- Location within Germany Location within Bavaria
- Coordinates: 47°59′N 11°52′E
- Country: Germany
- State: Bavaria
- Admin. region: Upper Bavaria
- District: Ebersberg
- Municipal assoc.: Glonn

Government
  - Mayor (2020–26): Josef Oswald (CSU)

Area
  - Total: 30.23 km^{2} (11.67 sq mi)
- Elevation: 536 m (1,759 ft)

Population (2025-12-31)
  - Total: 5,086
  - Density: 168.2/km^{2} (435.7/sq mi)
- Time zone: UTC+01:00 (CET)
  - Summer (DST): UTC+02:00 (CEST)
- Postal codes: 85625
- Dialling codes: 08093
- Vehicle registration: EBE
- Website: www.markt-glonn.de

Glonn (German pronunciation: [ɡlɔn]) is a market town in the Ebersberg district in Upper Bavaria, Germany, about 30 km (19 mi) southeast of Munich.

== Geography ==
The market town of Glonn is a health spa (Erholungsort), and the Glonn Valley is ringed by wooded hills, carved by the former Inn Glacier. To the south, the Alps are clearly visible on the horizon.

The rivers Glonn, Kupferbach and Schrannenbach rise within Glonn's municipal area, where the lake Kastensee is also to be found. Just inside the neighbouring community of Moosach lies the Steinsee, another lake. Glonn is also home to three protected areas.

The community of Glonn includes nine small villages: Adling, Balkham, Frauenreuth, Haslach, Mattenhofen, Kastenseeon, Reinstorf, Schlacht, Steinhausen and Wetterling.

== Neighbouring communities ==
Glonn's immediate neighbours are the communities of Baiern, Bruck, Egmating, Moosach and Oberpframmern, which together with Glonn form an administrative community (Verwaltungsgemeinschaft).

The town of Grafing and the centres of Kirchseeon, Zorneding and Höhenkirchen-Siegertsbrunn are about 15 km away. Nevertheless, it is there that regional and long-distance rail service is to be found.

Glonn lies roughly 30 km from the cities of Munich and Rosenheim.

== History ==
Early settlement in the New Stone Age is witnessed by a number of finds, among them a dwelling pit, weapons and jewellery. The town's name derives from the Celtic description of the local river Glana – "Clear".

In a donation document signed by the bishop of Freising on 21 March 774, Glonn is named as "Glan"; this is taken to be the earliest evidence of the town's founding. From about 1015, it is known that there was a local lordly family called "da Glana", and in 1349, the building register Monumenta Boica mentioned the Church of St. Johann zu Glan.

The name changed during the 16th century to "Glon" and then later to "Glonn", as it is still known now.

In 1632, during the Thirty Years' War, the Swedes burnt Glonn almost down to the ground. It took a very long time for the town to build itself back up again. Only in 1823, almost two centuries after the fire, was the new church finished and consecrated.

Since 1901, Glonn has had market rights and has had leave to hold yearly markets. Since 1908 there has been electricity, generated at the town's own power station by water power in some of the former mills. By 1914, 50% of Glonn's households were supplied.

Glonn shifted from a mainly agrarian village with little in the way of crafts to a modern minor centre with trade and crafts for the other nearby communities. Agriculture has sharply shrunk in importance.

After World War II Glonn was a refugee destination for those driven out of their homelands, those whose homes were bombed out and those who had been evacuated, and this new inflow of people eventually grew to become more than a third of the town's population. Many new houses had to be built, and in 1959 it became necessary to name the streets once the house numbering system in use up to the time was no longer useful for distinguishing addresses.

== Religion ==
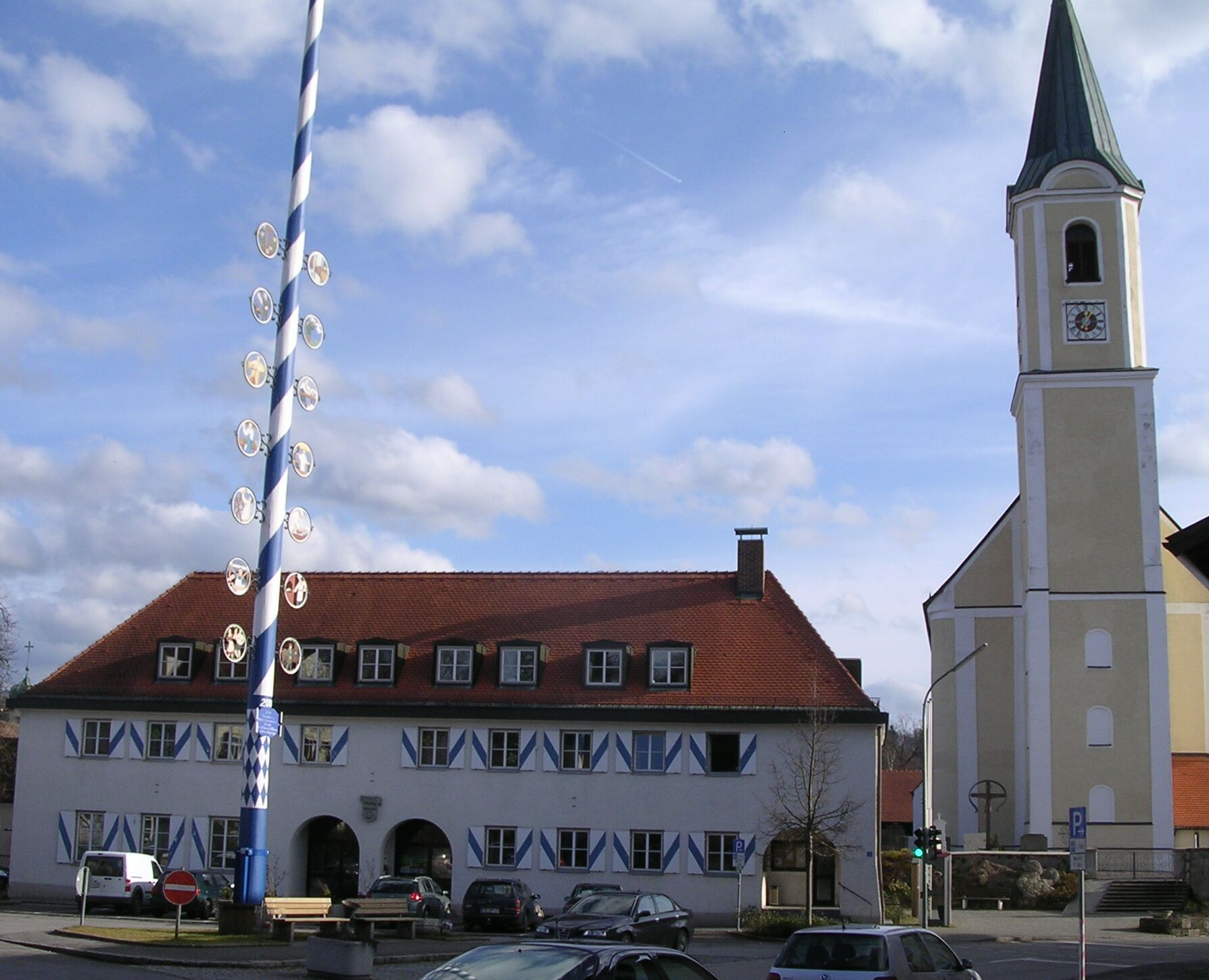
Marketplace in Glonn, with Maypole, town hall and parish church

The town has a Catholic parish church (St. Johannes Baptist) and an Evangelical church (Christuskirche, modern, built 1968), each a centre of a corresponding parish.

John the Baptist as church patron points to an early Christian baptismal church. Already by 1600 there was a Gothic church in the middle of the village. The current parish church's sacristy is a remnant of this earlier house of worship.

== Politics ==
=== Town council ===
The following parties and one local political organization are active:

- Social Democratic Party of Germany (SPD)
- Christian Social Union in Bavaria (CSU)
- Freie Wähler (FW)
- Kommunalpolitischen Arbeitskreis (KOMMA), who form a common list with the SPD at elections.

On town council, the SPD/KOMMA has 5 seats, and the CSU has 8. Including Major (as at July 2014).

=== Coat of arms ===
Glonn's arms might heraldically be described thus: In argent a four-spoked waterwheel sable above which a trout azure finned Or.

The waterwheel and the trout refer to the area's wealth in water and the seven former cornmills that were so important to the local economy.

=== Town partnership ===
(France) With the French village of Bonnefamille, contact was established in 1998 and led to alternating visits of clubs and delegations.

At the beginning of 2007, an intra-Bavarian partnership with the community of Markt Schwaben in the same district was established. The goal of this unusual pairing is to be the dovetailing of regions in the northern and southern parts of the district that are otherwise split by the Ebersberg Forest.

== Culture and sightseeing ==
=== Theatre ===
Every year in the autumn, the Glonn Costume Club's (Trachtenverein Glonn) theatre show is held at the Neuwirtssaal. The amateur players present several locally themed plays in Bavarian dialect.

=== Museums ===
==== Heimatmuseum ====
The Heimatmuseum Glonn ("Glonn Homeland Museum"), open at many times of the year, offers a glimpse into the town's history. Artefacts from prehistory as well as paintings and books by local artists and writers are on display. The writer Lena Christ's home life may be glimpsed in a faithfully reconstructed room at the museum.

==== Technological monument ====
The Stegmühle Glonn ("Glonn Footbridge Mill") technological monument in the valley Mühltal houses the electricity-generating pumphouse (piston pumps from the firm M.A.N.) preserved in the original form from 1906, still fully functional after more than a hundred years.

Until the mid-1990s, this apparatus was still generating electricity and feeding it into the local grid. Since then, however, it has fallen into disuse, but may be viewed on request to the owner who lives at the mill.

== Buildings ==
=== Schloss Zinneberg ===
Schloss Zinneberg, a local castle lying on the town's eastern outskirts on a prominent knoll on its namesake mountain, the Zinneberg, can nowadays only just be made out through the thick woods that have grown there. Its history most likely stretches back to the 11th century, although its origins are quite uncertain. Only in 1332, in a donation document to the noble family of Preysing, was the placename "Zinnenberg" reliably mentioned. As time passed, the castle found itself owned by several noble families who were influential in Bavaria.

In 1350, Otto von Pienzenau became by marriage Lord of Zinneberg. The castle's ownership then passed in 1596, once again by marriage, to the Fugger family, in whose hands it remained for the next 230 years. In 1632, during the Thirty Years' War, Schloss Zinneberg was burnt down. At this time arose the legend that a secret passage, allegedly still existing today, between the castle and the town afforded some of the castle's inhabitants an escape to safety. Already by 1640, Count Johannes Friedrich, himself a Fugger, had the castle rebuilt. In 1825, the castle was bought by Bavarian Electress Maria Leopoldine, who was married to Count Ludwig of Arco. She had it remodelled to her own tastes, and the castle is still mostly in this form today. From 1850 to 1868, the castle was owned by the Marquis Fabio von Pallavicini, who in turn sold it to Friedrich Wilhelm Scanzoni von Lichtenfels. In 1898, Baron Adolf von Büsing-Orville became the new lord of the castle. He was responsible for further expansions to the building, which still lend the castle a feudal character today.

Some of the town's street names recall these noble families ("Preysingstr.", "Pienzenauer Str.", "Fuggerstr.", "Arcostr.", "von-Scanzoni-Str.", "Büssingstr.").

On 14 September 1927 the castle was bought for 735,000 Reichsmarks by the Sisters of the Good Shepherd (Schwestern vom guten Hirten), who run it today as a residential school for girls from difficult social backgrounds. They also run a kindergarten there.

During the First World War, part of the castle was used as a military hospital with 60 beds. After the Second World War broke out, the training building was confiscated as a reserve Wehrmacht field hospital. In the Cold War, underground bunkers were built whose foreseen use was as a stationary auxiliary hospital.

=== Pfarrkirche St. Johann Baptist ===
The "Pfarrkirche St. Johann Baptist" (St. John the Baptist Parish Church) stands out prominently in the middle of town when one comes into Glonn from one of the surrounding hills.

After the old church was destroyed in the Thirty Years' War, a new church was begun about 1768, but finished and consecrated only in 1823. It is built in the Rococo style and contains altar figures and a crucifix with Schmerzhafte Muttergottes ("Mater Dolorosa") by the artist Joseph Götsch (a student of Ignaz Günther). In 1994 the church was completely renovated.

=== Convent school ===
In 1899, building work began on a girls' school in downtown Glonn, and on 24 October 1902 it was handed over to the then mayor “for the purpose of a girls’ school to be run by Catholic sisters”. This task was taken on by the nuns of the Maria Stern convent from Augsburg.

In the Third Reich, however, they were expelled from the school on 25 March 1937. This led to fierce protests by the girls' parents and in the end drew the Gestapo's attention when somebody put what is known locally as a Pfingstlümmel (a straw "Whitsun doll") on the neighbouring boys' school roof on Whitsunday. It was wearing a brown shirt such as was commonly worn by SA men, and also a Communist cap.

The nuns were able to start classes again after the war ended. As of 1964, there were mixed classes.

In the mid-1970s, the town acquired the convent and school building that had since been forsaken. Sometime later it was converted into a cultural and social centre for the community. The Homeland Museum mentioned above was given a home on the top floor. The "Altenstube" on the ground floor affords senior citizens a social venue. Also found in the building are the local chapter of the Bavarian Red Cross and a daycare centre. In the basement, a youth centre has been set up. For a time, the old classrooms were even once again used as such when the neighbouring elementary school needed overflow room to handle great numbers of pupils who were threatening to burst the school's seams. However, most of the building nowadays is used as a kindergarten, together with a newly built building in the former park nearby.

The old chapel with its sacristy and siderooms in the west part of the building is now used as an exhibition gallery. One can also rent the room for events. The community offers it as an attractive alternative to the registry office for civil marriage ceremonies.

=== Exhibitions and galleries ===
The Galerie in der Klosterschule offers artists a platform for their work with regular thematic exhibitions.

In the Schrottgalerie Friedel ("Friedel Scrap Metal Gallery") one can find all kinds of odd things made by a Glonn artist who makes sculptures out of scrap metal, which have already found a lasting place in many households. The Steinbeißer ("Stonebiter"), as tall as a man and found on the way into town right next to the car dealership of the same name, comes from this workshop.

Die kleine Galerie is a further platform for various artists.

=== Sport and leisure facilities ===
In the school building is maintained a small indoor swimming pool, which may also be used by the public.

Various sporting grounds serve bodily fitness. The central school sporting ground and the football field in the constituent community of Adling are used for training and league games by the ASV's (Allgemeiner Sportverein – "Common Sports Club") football teams. A basketball court is also open to the town's youth outside school hours, as are the two football pitches, each furnished with goals. A tennis court is also available. Two public children's playgrounds fill out Glonn's sport and leisure facilities.

The scenic countryside around the town invites hikers and cyclists, and when there is enough snow, the winter sport club runs a well groomed cross-country ski loop. Two small lifts at the Finkenhöhe are used by skiers. The lakes in the area afford bathing in the summer and skating in the winter.

Many guesthouses and beer gardens round out the town's offerings for visitors.

=== Regular events ===
Since 1901, the town has been having "Market Day" four times a year on the third Sunday before Lent, on the Sunday before Whitsun, on the first Sunday in August and on the first Sunday in October. Moreover, there is a Christkindlmarkt ("christmas market") on the second Sunday of Advent, and regular farmer's markets are held on the second Saturday of every month from May to October.

On one Saturday in mid-July, visitors to the Nachtflohmarkt ("night flea market") throng through the main street, mostly by candlelight and lantern light.

Known far and wide is the Glonner Dorffest ("Glonn Village Festival") which has been put on by the bigger clubs in Glonn since 1992 (Friday to Monday on the first weekend in the Bavarian summer holidays). Since many Glonners actually belong to one of these clubs, a good time is assured.

== Economy and infrastructure ==
=== Transport ===
Glonn's municipal area is crossed by district roads (Kreisstraßen) EBE 13 and EBE 14 as well as state roads (Staatsstraßen) St 2079 and St 2351. The nearest interchanges with the Bundesautobahn 99 are not far away.

Connections with neighbouring communities are provided by several buslines, which also afford connections with Munich S-Bahn lines S4 and S6 in the Munich Transport and Tariff Association. Glonn lies in this system's outermost fare zone.

By 1894, the local railway line between Grafing station and Glonn reached its end point at Glonn. The line was, however, abandoned in 1970 owing to low ridership. The place where the old railway station is now a large-scale bus station with two waiting room buildings and several bus bays. The name Bahnhofplatz – "Railway Station Square" – has been retained. The railway embankment can still be seen running through the Glonn Valley to Moosach. A plan to turn it into a cycling path has never been realized.

Munich Airport (MUC) is roughly 60 km away.

=== Established businesses ===
The following enterprises employing 50 or more workers each are to be found in Glonn:

- Busreisen Ettenhuber GmbH (bus trips)
- Glonntaler Fleisch- und Wurstwaren GmbH (meat and sausages)
- Hans Brunner GmbH & Co. KG (chocolate moulds)
- Herrmannsdorfer Landwerkstätten (handmade "ecological-quality" foods, Herrmannsdorfer Schweinsbräu brewery)
- MVG Voglrieder GmbH (furniture shop specializing in rattan and wooden furniture)

=== Public institutions ===
Glonn is seat of the community administration and of the administrative community (Verwaltungsgemeinschaft) of Glonn.

The State Council Office (Landratsamt), the court (Amtsgericht), police headquarters and other authorities responsible for Glonn are in Ebersberg.

Ebersberg notaries each hold, as a rule, a monthly office day at Glonn's town hall.

The local health insurance company offers advice every month at the town hall.

=== Education ===
- Volksschule Glonn (Grundschule and Hauptschule)
- Musikschule/Volkshochschule Grafing/Ebersberg
- Girls' boarding school at the “Good Shepherdesses’” convent, Schloß Zinneberg

=== Other institutions ===
- Gemeindebücherei Glonn
- Bürgersaal
- Kindergartens:
  - Pfarrkindergarten (parish)
  - AWO-Kindergarten (workers' welfare)
  - KiJuFa-Kindergarten
  - Kindergarten der Herrmannsdorfer Landwerkstätten
- Kinderhort und Mittagsbetreuung Glonn (daycare)
- Caritas-Seniorenheim "Marienheim" (home for the elderly)

== Notable people ==
=== Sons and daughters of the town ===
- Lena Christ (30 October 1881 — 30 June 1920), writer
- Prof. Dr. Max Lebsche (11 September 1886 — 22 September 1957), physician, heart surgery pioneer, founder and chief doctor of the Maria-Theresia-Klinik in Munich
- Georg Lanzenberger (born 1897), painter
- Karl Koller (22 February 1898 — 22 December 1951), pilot, distance record in 1921 in gliding with 5 km, first 360°-circle flight without loss of height in a glider in 1921, last Chief of the Luftwaffe General Staff in the Second World War from November 1944 until war's end in 1945

=== Other well-known citizens ===
- Prof. Günter Bialas (1907–1995), composer
- Karl Ludwig Schweisfurth (born 30 July 1930), entrepreneur, pioneer of ecological food creation and processing, founder of the Schweisfurth Foundation and the Herrmansdorfer Landwerkstätten
- Susanne Osthoff (born 7 March 1962), archaeologist, seized and held hostage for three weeks in Iraq in November 2005 (her last known German address before this, until May 2005, was in Glonn)
