= Henrike Hahn =

German politician (born 1970)

Henrike Hahn MEP
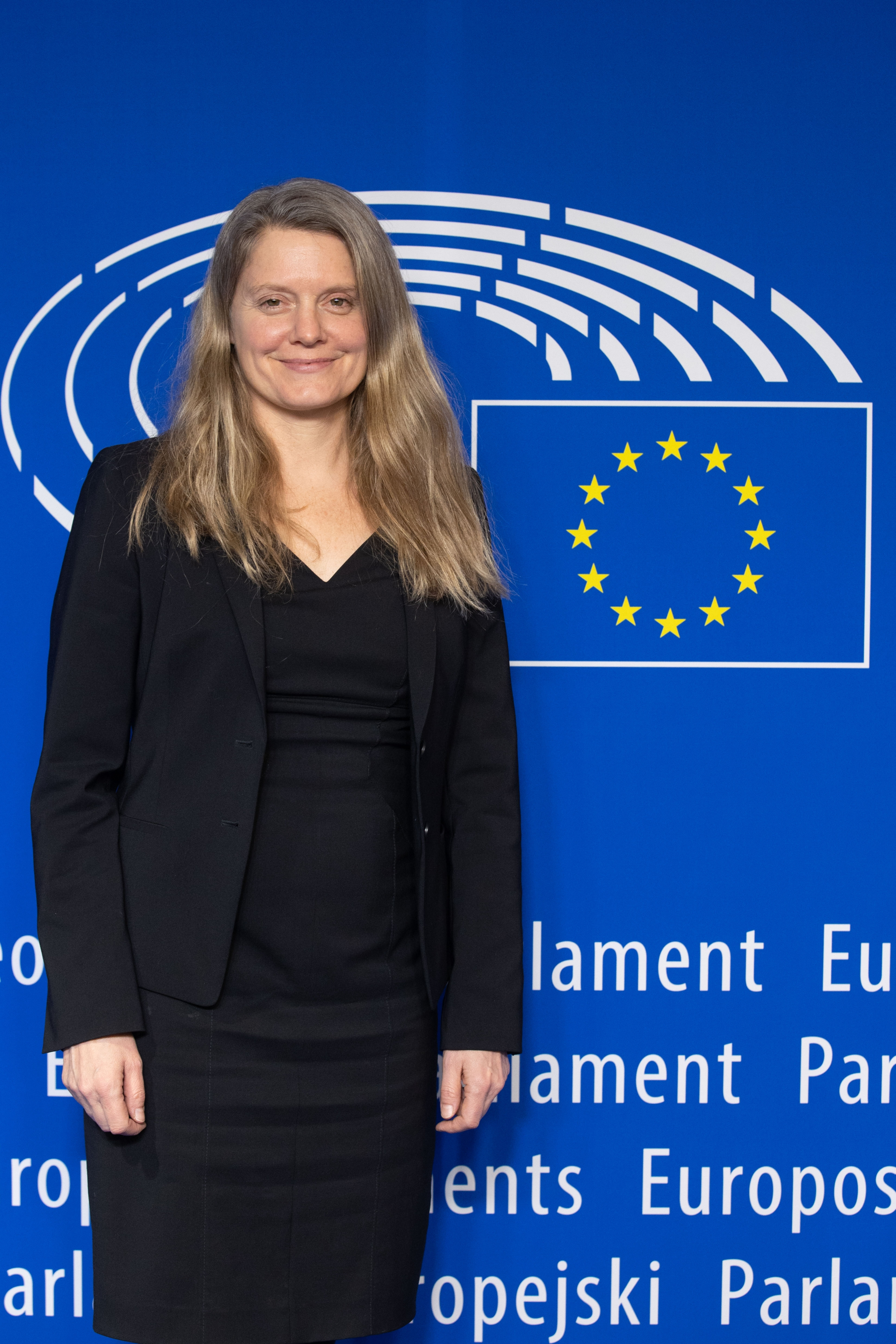

Member of the European Parliament
- In office 2 July 2019 – 15 July 2024

Personal details
- Born: 4 September 1970 (age 56) Munich
- Party: Alliance 90/The Greens
- Other political affiliations: European Green Party
- Children: 2
- Education: Paris-Sorbonne University; Michigan University; Wayne State University; LMU Munich
- Website: https://henrike-hahn.eu/

Henrike Hahn (born 4 September 1970) is a German politician who has been a Member of the European Parliament from July 2019 to July 2024. She is a member of Alliance 90/The Greens (German: Bündnis 90/Die Grünen or Grüne) at national level, and sat with the Group of the Greens/European Free Alliance in the European Parliament.

== Academic career ==
Hahn is a political scientist, having studied at Sorbonne-Nouvelle in Paris, University of Michigan in Ann Arbor, Wayne State University in Detroit, and LMU Munich.

== Early career ==
For many years, Hahn worked as a consultant for technology-oriented companies, with a focus on strategy consulting, market research, and competitive analysis in Paris and Munich. From 2010 to 2015, she worked as political advisor for the Bavarian State Parliament. In 2017, she worked as political advisor at the German Bundestag. She also worked as a researcher on Europe and Transatlantic relations at the Centre for Applied Policy Research (CAP) at LMU Munich; as visiting researcher at the American Institute for Contemporary German Studies (AICGS); and in the research team on European integration at the German Institute for International and Security Affairs (SWP).

== Political career ==
Hahn has been an active member the Bavarian Greens since 2012, having also served as the spokeswoman for the Green Bavarian Greens working group for economy and finance. She has been a board member of the Bavarian Greens October 2017 till 2019. She previously ran for election to the European Parliament in 2014.

Since the 2019 European elections, Hahn has been a Member of the European Parliament as well as deputy speaker of the German delegation and industrial policy speaker of The Greens/EFA. She has been serving on the Committee on Industry, Research and Energy, Committee on Economic and Monetary Affairs and Committee on Budgets as well as participating member of the Committee on EU Affairs of the German Bundestag In addition to her committee assignments, she was part of the Parliament's delegations for relations with China and the United States.

== Other activities ==
Hahn is a member of Amnesty International, the German Alpine Club, the German Federation for the Environment and Nature Conservation (Friends of the Earth Germany), and Greenpeace.

== Personal life ==
Hahn was born in Munich, and grew up in Oberpframmern close to Munich in Germany. She currently lives in Munich-Neuhausen and Brussels with her two daughters.
