= Emmering =

Emmering may refer to places in Bavaria, Germany:

- Emmering, Ebersberg, in the district of Ebersberg
- Emmering, Fürstenfeldbruck, in the district of Fürstenfeldbruck
