= Aßling =

- Municipality
- Coat of arms

- Location of Aßling within Ebersberg district
- Interactive map of Aßling
- Location within Germany Location within Bavaria
- Coordinates: 48°0′N 12°0′E
- Country: Germany
- State: Bavaria
- Admin. region: Oberbayern
- District: Ebersberg
- Municipal assoc.: Aßling

Government
  - Mayor (2020–26): Hans Fent (Ind.)

Area
  - Total: 31.37 km^{2} (12.11 sq mi)
- Elevation: 489 m (1,604 ft)

Population (2025-12-31)
  - Total: 4,545
  - Density: 144.9/km^{2} (375.2/sq mi)
- Time zone: UTC+01:00 (CET)
  - Summer (DST): UTC+02:00 (CEST)
- Postal codes: 85617
- Dialling codes: 08092
- Vehicle registration: EBE
- Website: www.assling.de

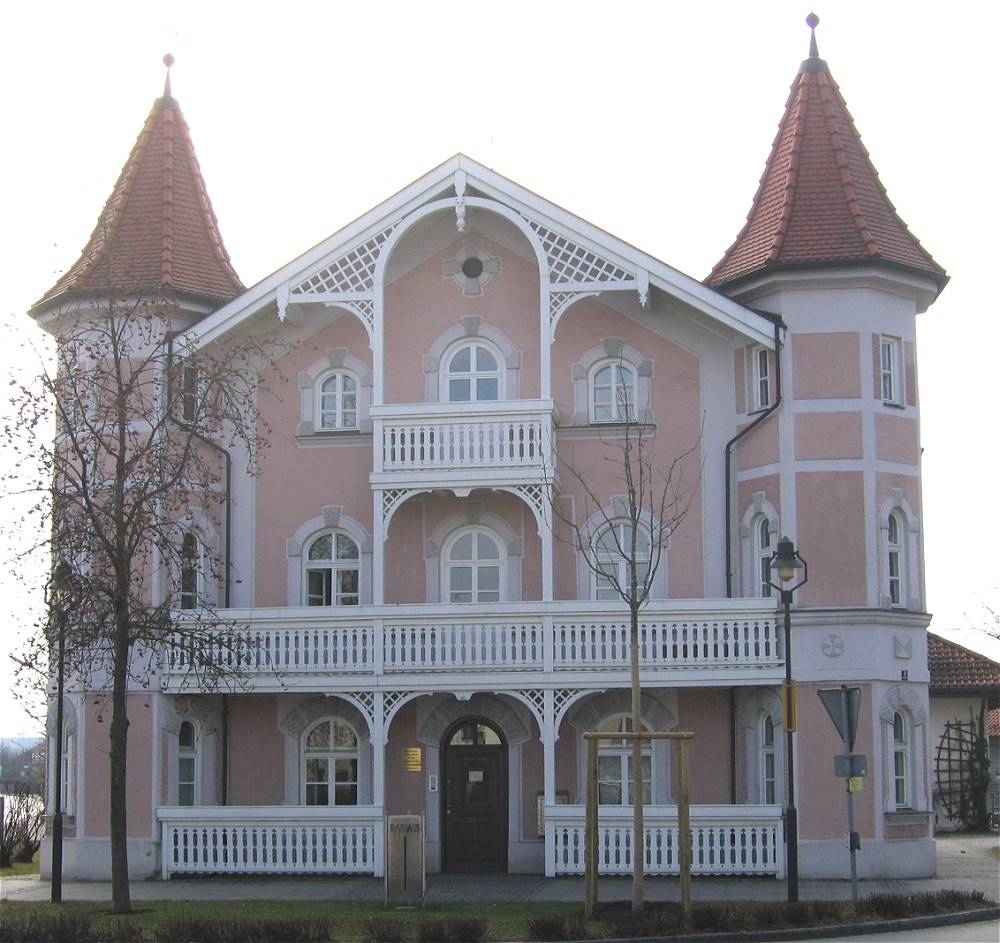
Town Hall

Aßling (German pronunciation: [ˈaslɪŋ]) is a municipality in the district of Ebersberg, Upper Bavaria, Germany. It is, along with the communities of Emmering and Frauenneuharting, a member of the administrative community (Verwaltungsgemeinschaft) of the same name.

== Geography ==
Aßling lies within the Munich commuter area, about 40 km from that city. It has its own railway station on the Munich–Salzburg line. Grafing bei München lies only 7 km away, Ebersberg is 11 km away, Wasserburg am Inn 23 km and Rosenheim 20 km. However, there is no connection to any main highway in the Aßling area.

Aßling also holds two rural areas (Gemarkungen), Aßling and Loitersdorf.

== History ==
Aßling had its first documentary mention, as Azzalinga, on 18 September 778. The place belonged to the Rentamt of Munich and the Court of Swabia of the Electorate of Bavaria. Aßling was the seat of a captaincy (Hauptmannschaft), a historical form of administration. The community in its current form came into being in 1818 with the constituent communities of Adelpolt, Ametsbichl, Aßling, Ast, Bichl, Haar, Holzen, Längholz, Langkofen, Martermühle, Niclasreuth, Obstädt, Osterwald, Pörsdorf, Pürzelberg, Rammel, Sixtenreit, Sonnenreit, Steinkirchen, Stelzenreit, Tegernau, Thaldorf and Wollwies.

In 1978, as part of administrative reform, the formerly separate community of Loitersdorf was amalgamated with Aßling along with its constituent communities of Dorfen, Hochreit, Lorenzenberg, Loitersdorf, Obereichhofen, Untereichhofen, Pfadendorf, Hainza, Pausmühle, Setzermühle and Siglmühle.

=== Population development ===
The community's land area was home to 3112 inhabitants in 1970, 3319 in 1987 and 4031 in 2000.

== Politics ==
The community's mayor (Bürgermeister) is Hans Fent. He was re-elected in March 2020 as the candidate for the Greens, Free Voters and SPD.

The community's tax revenue in 1999, converted into euros, was €1,964,000, of which €324,000 was from business taxes.

== Coat of arms ==
Aßling's arms might heraldically be described thus: In azure a six-spoked wheel argent ringed with three flowers argent with middles Or. The official German blazon (In Blau ein sechsspeichiges silbernes Rad, beiderseits und unten begleitet von je einer silbernen Blume mit goldenem Butzen) says that the flowers are on each side and underneath, but the usual interpretation is to have the flowers surrounding the wheel in the form of a triangle pointing down.

== Photos ==
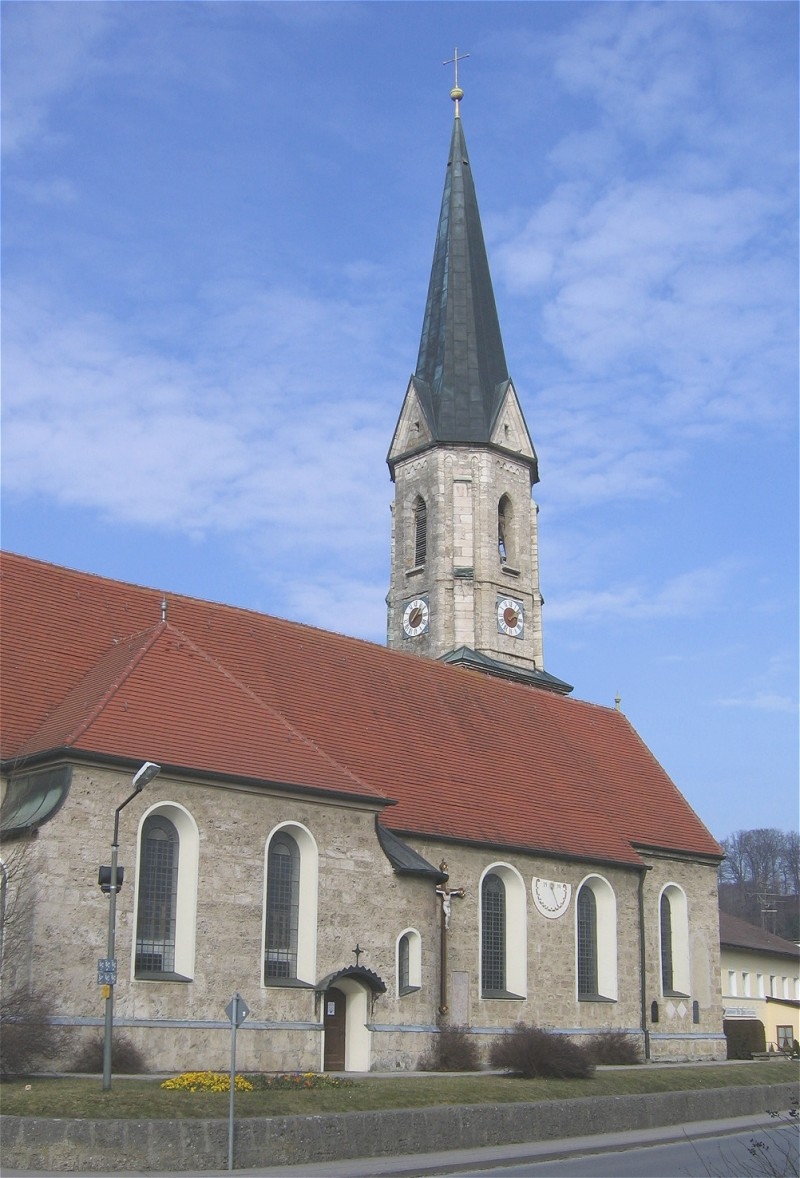
Saint George's church in Aßling

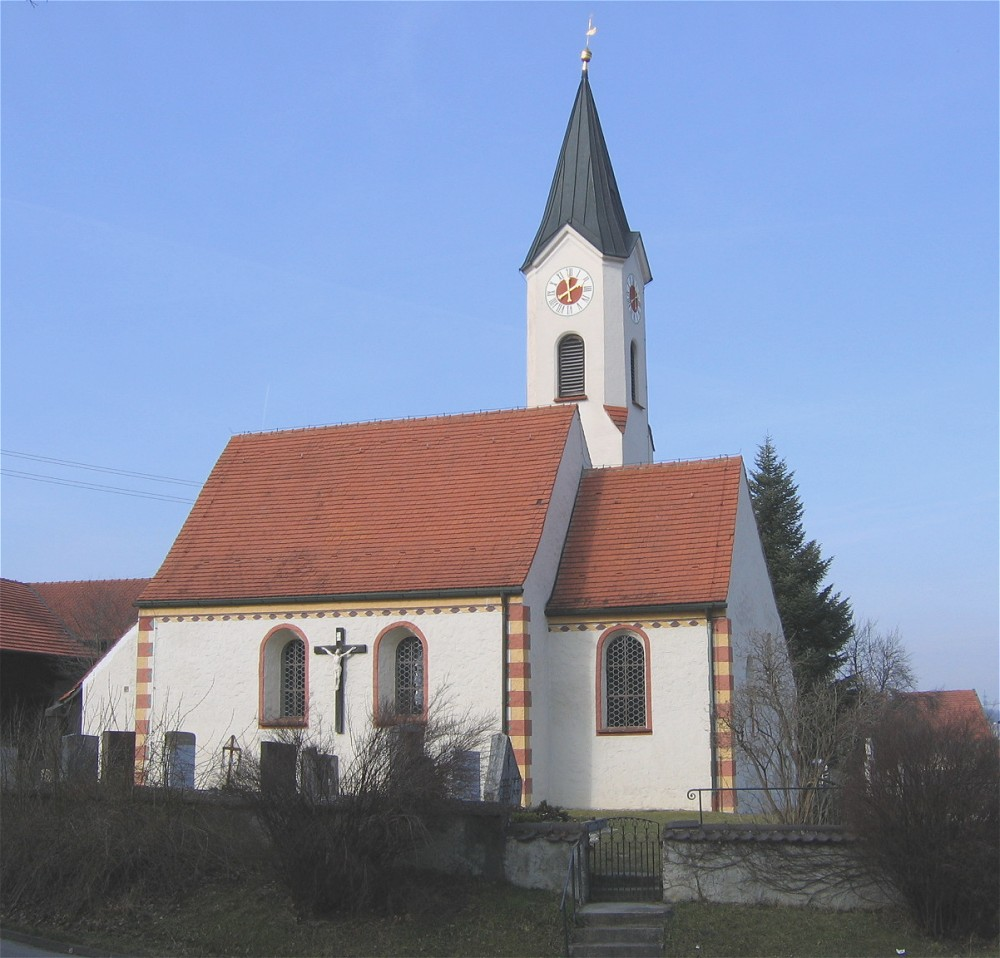
Church in Lorenzenberg

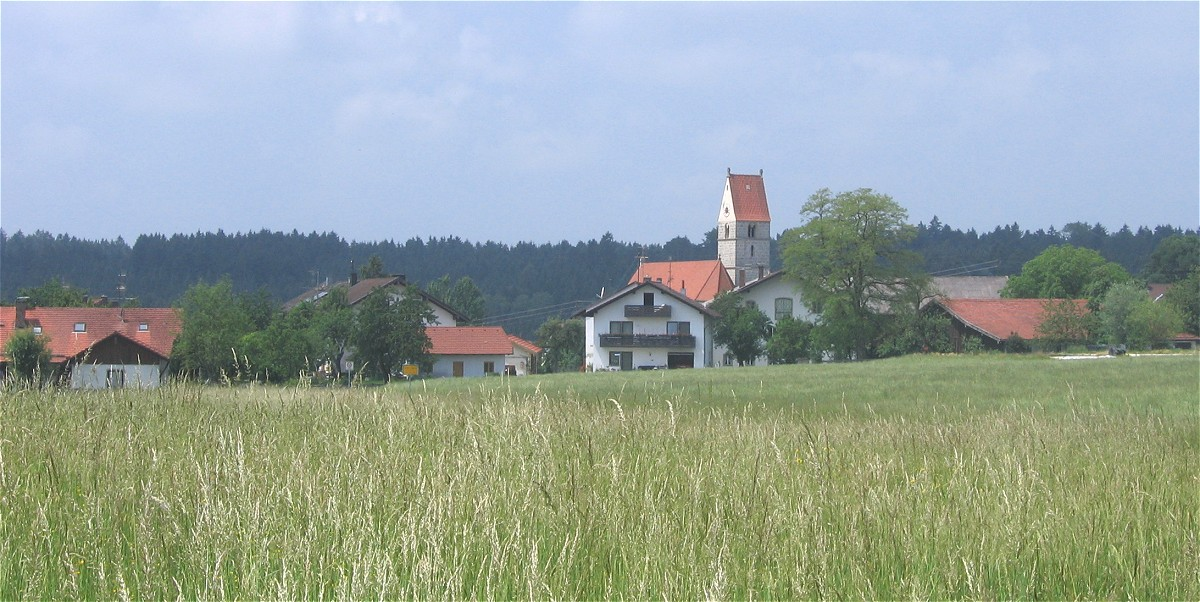
Constituent community of Dorfen

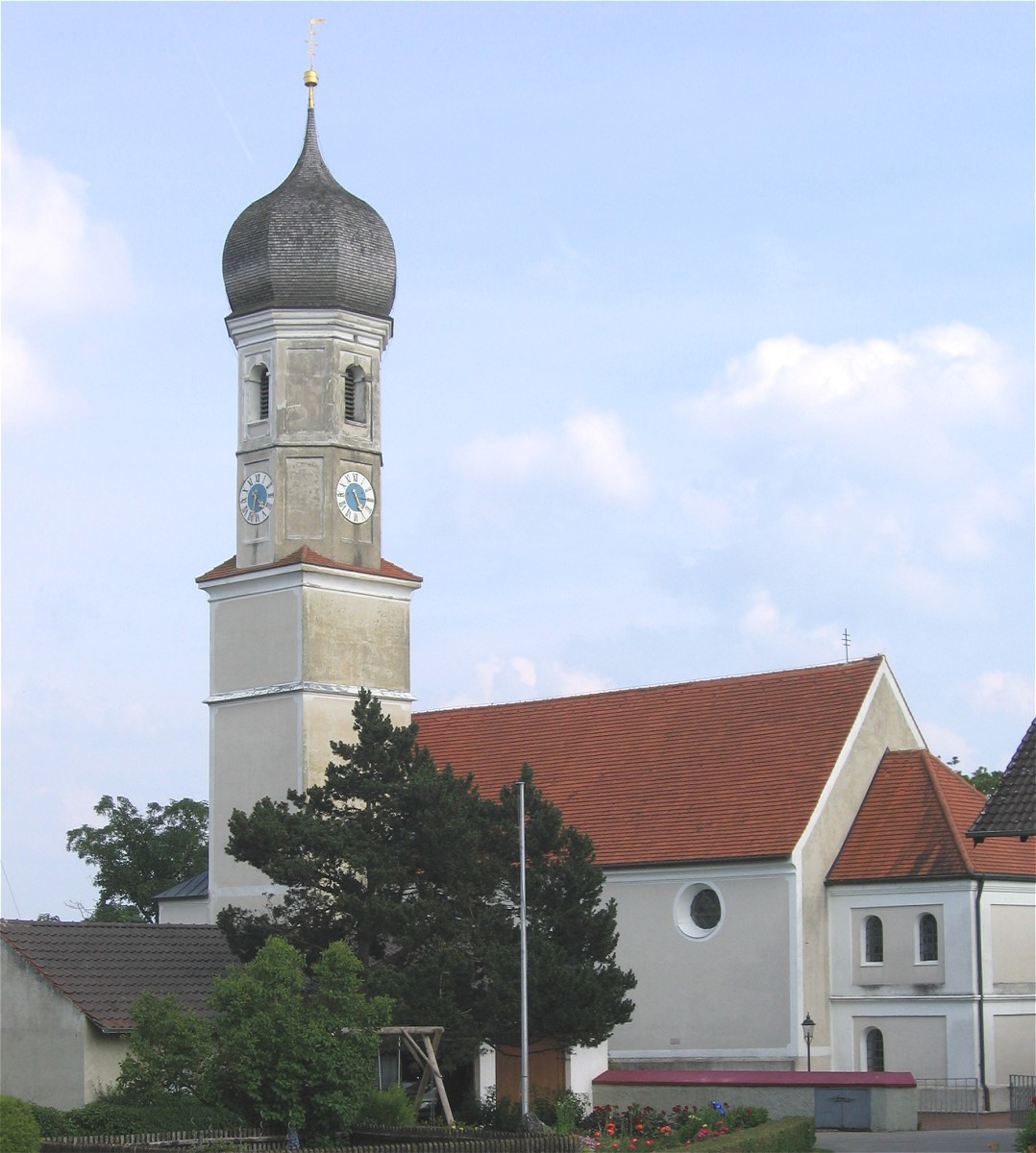
Church in Steinkirchen

== Economy and infrastructure ==
In 1998, agriculture and forestry employed 11 people who paid social insurance contributions. There were 182 in manufacturing and 122 in trade and transportation. There were 159 people employed in other occupations. Furthermore, 1240 of those on the aforementioned rolls worked from home. Nobody worked in the manufacturing industry. There were nine contracting firms. Furthermore, in 1999, there were 97 agricultural businesses with a total productive land area of 1720 ha, of which 480 ha was cropland and the remaining 1240 ha was meadowland.

== Education ==
In 1999, the following institutions could be found in Aßling:

- Kindergarten: 167 Kindergarten places with 140 children
- Elementary school: 1 with 27 teachers and 485 pupils
