= Lena Christ =

German writer (1881–1920)

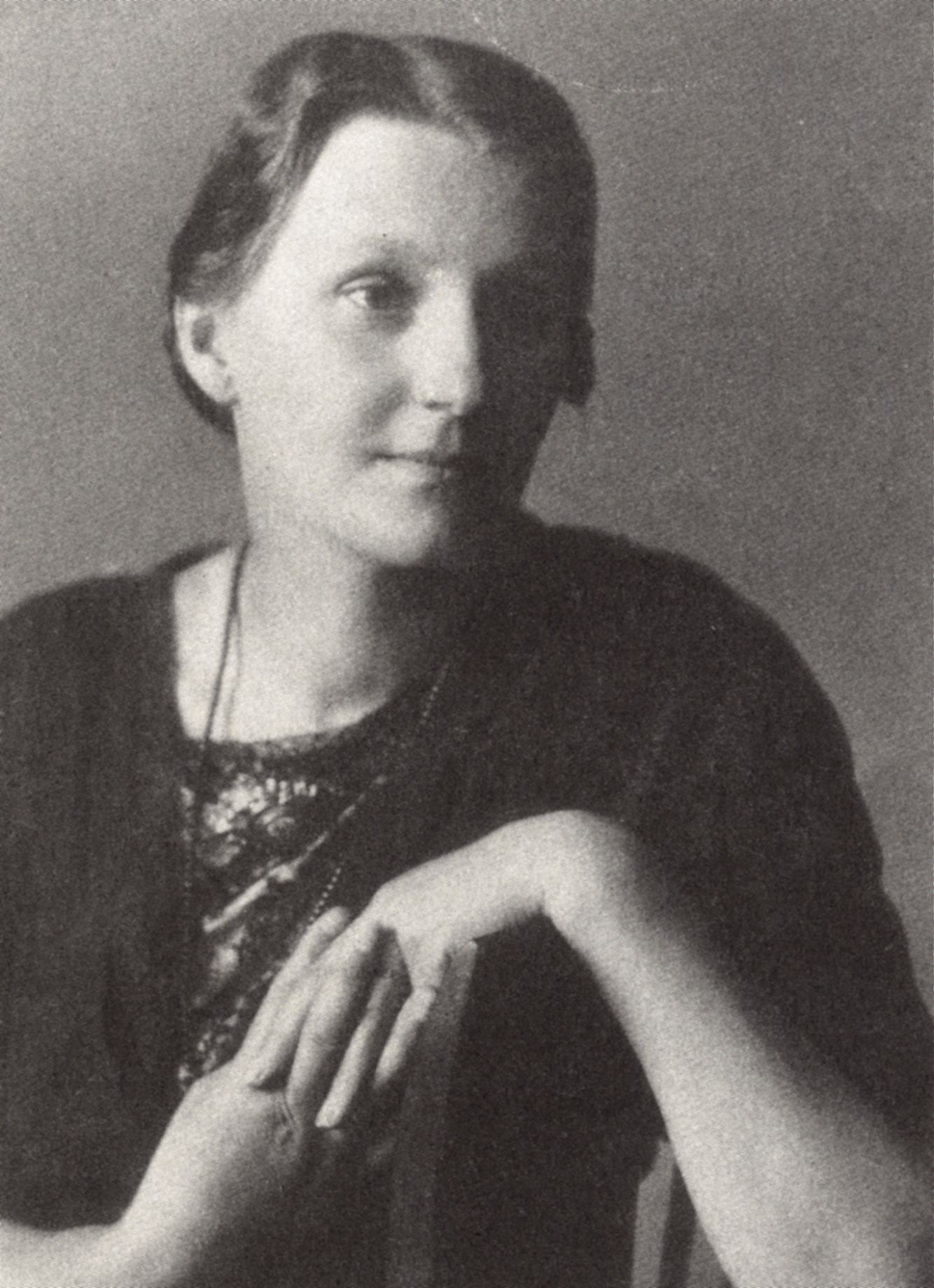
- Christ c. 1911
- Born: Magdalena Pichler; 30 October 1881; Glonn, Kingdom of Bavaria, German Empire
- Died: 30 June 1920 (aged 38); Munich, Free State of Bavaria, Weimar Republic
- Occupation: Writer
- Spouses: Anton Leix (m. 1901; div. 1912); Peter Benedix (m. 1912)
- Children: 3

Lena Christ (German: [ˈleːna ˈkʁɪst]; née Magdalena Pichler; 30 October 1881 – 30 June 1920) was a German writer.

== Life and works ==
Lena Christ was born as the nonmarital child of Magdalena Pichler (1860–1928), then a cook on Zinneberg near Glonn. Smith journeyman and salesman Karl Christ from Mönchsroth near Dinkelsbühl admitted to paternity. Despite this explicit profession by Karl Christ, then employed with Munich cavalry captain Rittmeister Ewald Hornig, and his commitment to alimony, later contemporaries and biographers doubted his paternity. Rather Scanzoni zu Lichtenfels at Schloss Zinneberg was to be suspected as true father. This speculation was fed through Lena Christ's statement that her mother claimed her father went missing and lost his life in the sinking of the Cimbria on 19 January 1883 on route to America at the high seas. There was however no Karl Christ registered in the passenger lists. Lena Christ's mother therefore wanted or had to keep the true paternity concealed. Christ's biological paternity is viewed as relatively improbably today. Glonn's local chronicler Hans Obermair also noted that Karl Christ did emigrate to America, but only later, and he did arrive safely. He suspects Albert of Scanzoni and Ewald Hornig as likely fathers. Despite her pen name, it remained unclear if Lena Christ herself was convinced that Karl Christ was her father.

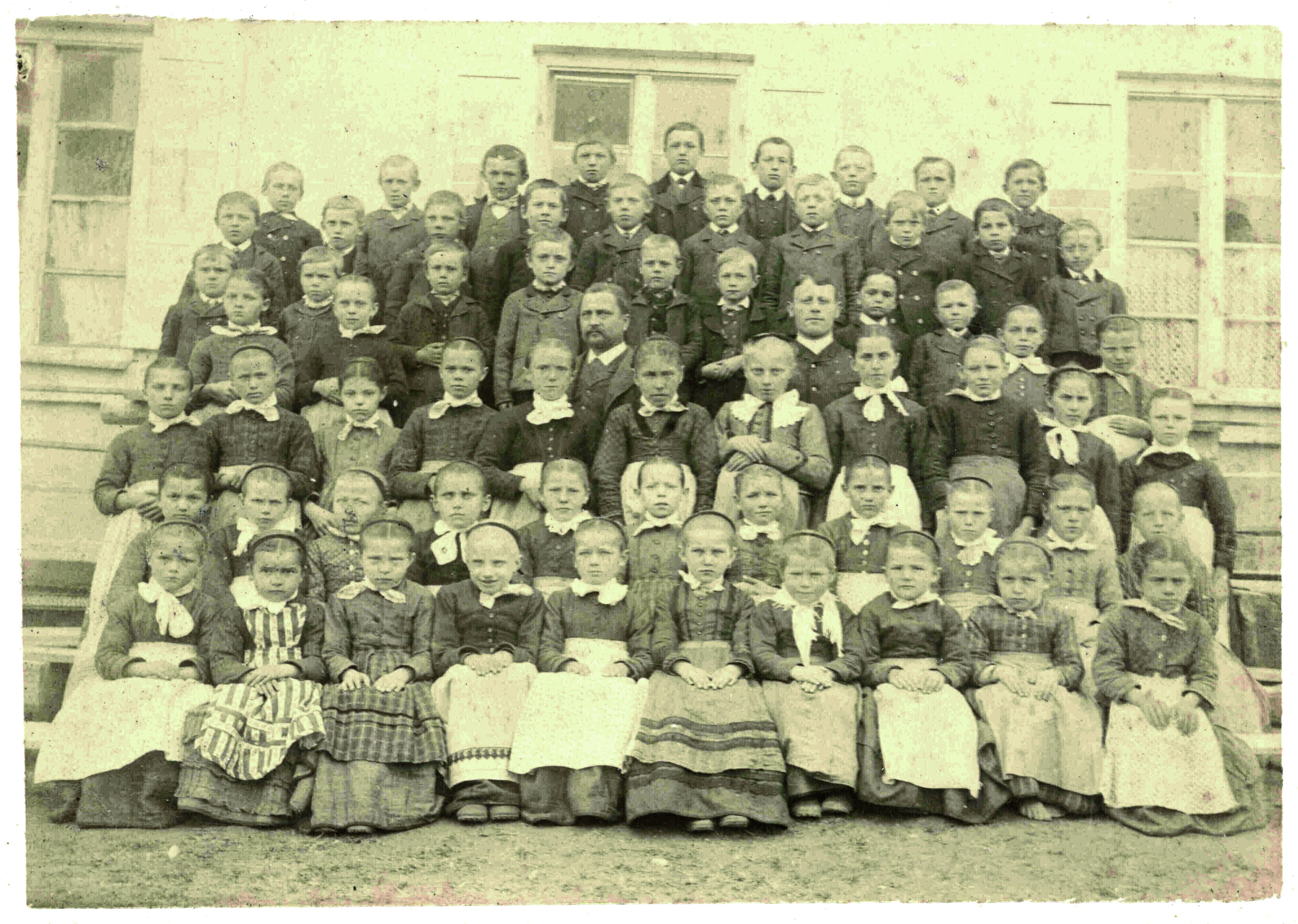
School class photo ca. 1893 (Lena Christ in the middle of the bottom row with apron with two dark stripes)

The first seven years of her live Lena Christ stayed with her grandfather, the farmer Mathias Pichler (Bichler) (1827–1894), and her step-grandmother and grand-aunt Magdalena Pichler née Hauser. She later remembered this time as her happiest one, she only once had contact to her "Munich mother". In school she, the "Hansschusterleni", appeared as talented and bright. Lena Christ was very attached to her grandfather, whom she admired all of her life and to whom she later dedicated the novel Mathias Bichler. He was called "Hansschuster" after his farm, and was considered kind-hearted, quiet and modest; he was popular in the village and appreciated as helpful.

In 1888 her mother married the butcher journeyman Josef Isaak and took the seven-year-old girl against the will of the grandparents to her to Munich. In the parental inn she had to do heavy labour. The relationship to her mother was marked by hate-love and inflicted abuse. She was exploited and suffered greatly under the coldness of her mother and the bodily punishments. Because of this massive mistreatment by the mother, Lena Christ since 1892 lived one more year with her grandparents in Glonn. In the middle of 1893 came another return to Munich; there the emotional and bodily mistreatment by the mother continued unchanged. The death of her grandfather in 1894 led the desperate Lena Christ to attempt suicide.

To avoid the hard labour and the outbursts of the mother, she decided in 1898 to enter the Premonstratensian abbey in Ursberg as candidate and teaching student, but left again after one-and-a-half years and returned to her parents' house.

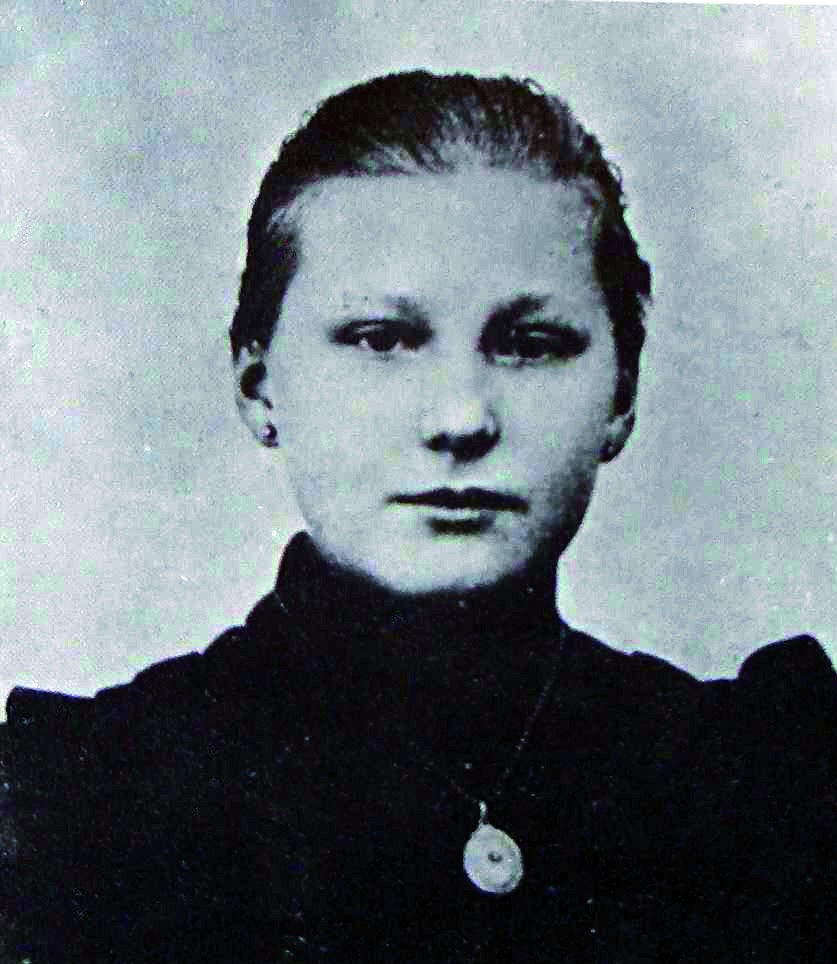
Lena Christ 1898

Another conflict with the mother led to another suicide attempt in 1900. She was found with slit wrists in the wine cellar of the parental inn and saved by her step-father, who did not mistreat her but neither protected her from her mother. In the same year she began working as cook and waitress in the tourist restaurant "Floriansmühle" in the north of Munich. She flourished there, but homesickness and a misunderstood sense of duty drew her back into her parents' house at Christmas. In 1901 she married the accounting clerk Anton Leix and moved with him into a flat in the house of her parents-in-law. The wedding was, as was then the norm, purely a marriage of convenience. Many suitors wooed the attractive Lena Christ, but she decided, together with her parents, according to the status, occupation and fortune of the husband. In 1902 she gave birth to her son Anton, a year later to her daughter Magdalena. Soon there were crises in the marriage. Anton Leix began to drink and gamble and broke with his parents, the couple had to leave their house in 1904. Many changes of residence followed and Lena Christ later complained about violent, also sexual assaults by her husband. In 1906 she gave birth to daughter Alexandra Eugenie. She also suffered three miscarriages. Her husband increasingly stood out due to his alcoholism and the resulting financial difficulties. In 1909 Lena broke up with him and left him. Son Anton came to the parents-in-law and no longer had any contact with his mother. Anton Leix was sentenced for misappropriation in the same year, and imprisoned in Nuremberg penitentiary until 1914. He later remarried and died in 1942 aged 64 years. In her "Erinnerungen" (Remembrances), Lena Christ has her raving mad husband commit to an asylum and find his end there.

By doing desk work Lena Leix tried to provisionally earn a living for herself and her two daughters. In Haidhausen she stayed rent-free in new buildings to "live them dry". In 1910 she came down grievously with pneumonia, the daughters were taken from her and turned over to a Catholic children's home. Notes and documents from the royal police department suggest that Lena Christ occasionally prostituted herself at this time, to secure the livelihood for herself and the children. In March 1911 she was sentenced of procuration and in June 1911 of professional fornication by Munich's court of lay assessors to four weeks of arrest each.

Since 1911 she was working as dictation writer at the author Peter Jerusalem, who later became well known as Peter Benedix. In 1912 she married him; the marriage with Anton Leix had been divorced 13 March 1912. Jerusalem induced her to write down her personal experiences.

In September 1912 her debut book Erinnerungen einer Überflüssigen (remembrances of an unnecessary one) came out at the publisher Albert Langen under the name of Lena Christ, which she used for all other publications. In it she portrayed in unusually drastic words her life, the shattered relationship to her mother and the human and sexual tragedies of her marriage. Her daughters came back to her in the same year. The book was not initially successful, but was praised by literary criticism and an amicable contact with Ludwig Thoma, Wilhelm Langewiesche and Korfiz Holm began. At this time, until 1914 she lived in the villa colony Gern in Munich.

In 1913 she wrote the book Lausdirndlgeschichten (naughty girl stories), also composed of memories from her childhood. Thoma criticized her for it and saw it as a rip-off of his Lausbubengeschichten (naughty boy stories). Gradually she achieved literary success. Her novel Mathias Bichler, however, remained largely unnoticed at the time of its publication in 1914. In it she portrayed the adventurous live of a small-time wood carver in the Leitzach valley and Tyrol. It was her first literary work that did not draw on autobiographical experiences. The book Unsere Bayern anno 14 (our Bavarians in the year 14), published after the beginning of the First World War, made her widely known; it was followed in 1915 by Unsere Bayern anno 14/15 (our Bavarians in the year 14/15). In them she collected stories which portrayed the events and atmosphere at the beginning of the First World War in Bavaria, in the city and in the countryside. In 1915 she was invited to an audience with king Ludwig III, and in the following year received the Ludwigskreuz for her patriotic merits. Also in 1916 she started working on the drama Die Rumplhanni, which she rewrote into a novel on the advice of Benedix. In it she describes the unscrupulous attempts of Johanna Rumpl, cook from Öd (close to Schönau near Bad Aibling), to achieve social advancement and independence. Lena Christ's own memories as well as experiences of her mother flowed into the novel. In 1917 Christ disbanded her household in Munich and moved to Landshut, to where Benedix, conscripted in 1915, was detached. Lena Christ fell ill of tuberculosis and depression.

Through Benedix, at readings in the military hospital in 1918, she made the acquaintance of the young singer and war invalid Ludwig Schmidt, née Lodovico Fabri as son of German parents in Italy, and fell in love with him. She left Benedix and moved together with Schmidt, her "boy", back to Munich. In 1919 she published stories und the title Bauern (peasants), and Madam Bäuerin (Madam Peasant), a humorous work, which was however criticized for seeming "raw" and "incomplete", with lack of concentration due to the war and private crises suspected as the reason. In autumn, Benedix separated from his wife. In 1920 Ludwig Schmidt left Lena Christ, who for him was just one affair among many. Fallen into economic hardship, she signed valueless pictures with the names of well-known painters, sold them and thus got into conflict with the law for forgery. To protect her mother, initially her daughter Magdalena took the blame.

Threatened by a prison sentence, on June 30, 1920, she went by tram to Munich Waldfriedhof/Alter Teil (Old Section) (grave no. 44-3-1 (Note: Coordinates: 48°06′36.5″N 11°29′52.6″O, at the south edge of burial ground 44.)). There she met her husband Peter Benedix, who handed her a dose of cyanide. With the poison she committed suicide in front of the grave of Ludwig Schmidt's father. Today it is in doubt if mainly the imminent prison sentence or depression and the wish to preserve her honour led her to this step. Before her suicide she wrote several extensive farewell letters, among others to Ludwig Thoma and her son-in-law Heinrich Dietz. In her grave (Waldfriedhof no. 44-3-14) later her youngest daughter Alexandra († 1933), and her half-brother Friedrich Isaak († 1973) and his wife Berta († 1958) were interred after her. On the burial cross the date of Lena Christ's death instead of June 30 is written as June 31, not actually existent in the calendar.

Her private library today resides in Munich's city library.

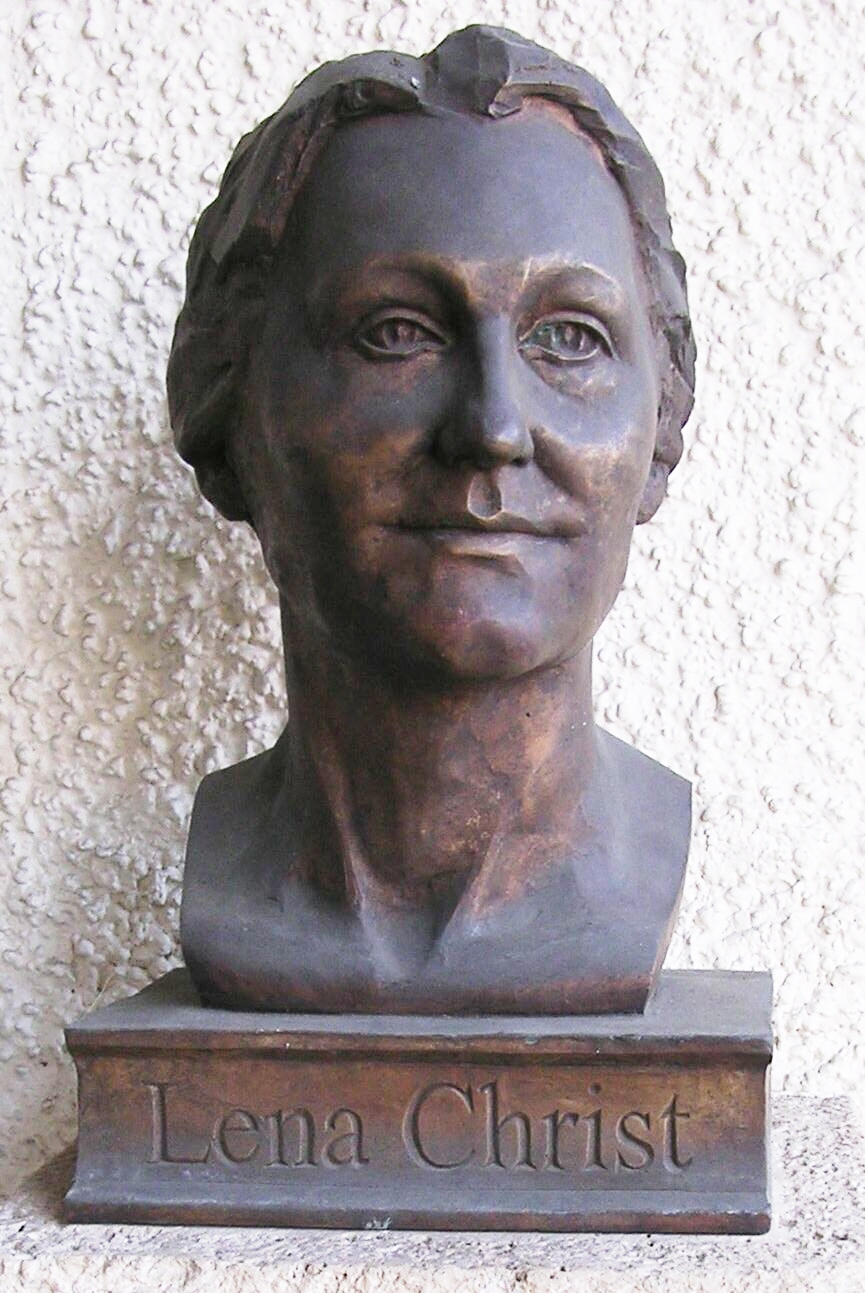
Bust of Lena Christ at the town hall in Glonn

== Significance and reception ==
Lena Christ is regarded as a pivotal figure in German literature. Her notable works include Erinnerungen einer Überflüssigen (Memories of a Superfluous Woman), Die Rumplhanni, and Mathias Bichler. Christ’s writing is characterized by the integration of personal observations and autobiographical experiences, offering detailed insights into the lives of the working class, domestic servants, and rural populations in early 20th-century Bavaria. While Christ remains a prominent representative of socially critical regional literature (Heimatkunst), other contemporary authors of the genre, such as Emerenz Meier, have received comparatively less enduring recognition.

Regional historian Maria Sedlmaier wrote about Lena Christ: Her books are full of love of her country, the material she drew from her homeland, she was a very demotic writer, knew masterly how to romance, concise in dialogue gripping, exciting, full of humour and wit, but at times somewhat profane.

Münchner Neueste Nachrichten wrote eleven years after Lena Christ's death: if she had not left the racing track ahead of time, she would today probably be the most famous poet of Bavaria, would stand in one front with the best names of the new German narrative. Literary critic Werner Mahrholz named her as purely poetically perhaps next to Annette Droste the greatest, strongest, most sensual talent of all our literature.

Biographer Marita Panzer stated that Lena Christ had produced a considerable opus in the short time span of eight years, which gains recognition until today. That many reviewers assigned her to the Heimatkunst (de) movement due to her peasant parentage and use of Bavarian idiom, Panzer saw as incorrect, however. The home, the village, the peasantry Lena Christ in no way portrayed as an idyll, but described a hard, hierarchical reality, violence and bigotry. Additionally Lena Christ had lived since her eighth year of life as an innkeeper's daughter in the city of Munich.

In Erinnerungen einer Überflüssigen Panzer in no way sees a pure autobiography: The novel satisfies a literary aspiration, is not purely subjective but dramatized and for the most part a literary construct. Literary scholar Herta-Elisabeth Renk praised the book as a great literary and human testimony, as poetry and truth of a woman, a time, a society, but criticized that Christ did not distinguish between objective truth and subjective treatment in her portrayals.

Gunna Wendt describes in her biography that for Lena Christ writing was a "line of escape", which allowed her to not just suffer her live passively, but to shape it actively. Thus powerlessness became the power of a creator. Monika Baumgartner in 1981 played the title role in the film adaptation of Die Rumplhanni, where, according to her own statements, she aggressively sought for the role with Rainer Wolffhardt. Baumgartner showed herself enthusiastic of Lena Christ, whose opus she compared to that of Oskar Maria Graf: "This language, this unwieldiness, that is more Graf, with him it creaks just like that. Ludwig Thoma is much smoother there."

Ghemela Adler asserted in her dissertation that Peter Benedix shaped the image of Lena Christ to this day. As representative of the conservative-traditionalistic Heimatkunst movement he declared Lena Christ to a "primitive-childlike woman", whose art of storytelling was "instinctive". He described his wife, notably decades later, as a physically and psychically sick woman, who needed care and guidance. He called Lena Christ an uneducated child-woman, who drew her works from the subconscious. This interpretation was followed in part by biographer Günter Goepfert. Marita Panzer objects to such constructions. According to her Lena Christ was an intelligent and artistically talented woman, full of creativity and funny ideas. Already in 1998 Ingrid Reuther insisted that the biography of Lena Christ was in need of revision. The biography by Peter Benedix in large parts lacked the appropriate distance and was full of one-sided portrayals. Benedix’ biography read like a vindication, the vindication of a man who literarily stood in the shadow of his wife throughout his live, but presented himself as her discoverer and mentor. For years he disputed with Lena Christ's daughters for royalties and exploitation rights. Dominik Baur points out that Benedix, despite to his credit having recognized Lena Christ's talent, and also having disadviced her against typical heimat literature in the vein of Thoma und Ganghofer, but rather having pointed her to representatives of realism like Jeremias Gotthelf and Gottfried Keller, was an "unpleasant type", an ambivalent if not shady character. Instead of dissuading her from the suicide, he confirmed her in this intention. Author Asta Scheib holds the same view, that he talked her into the suicide to profit from it afterwards. In excessive overconfidence he inflated his role as Christ's discoverer. He published the biography Der Weg der Lena Christ (the way of Lena Christ) in 1940, exactly after twenty years, when the period of limitation had expired, in which he acknowledged for the first time that he had acquired the poison for Lena Christ.

== Commemoration ==
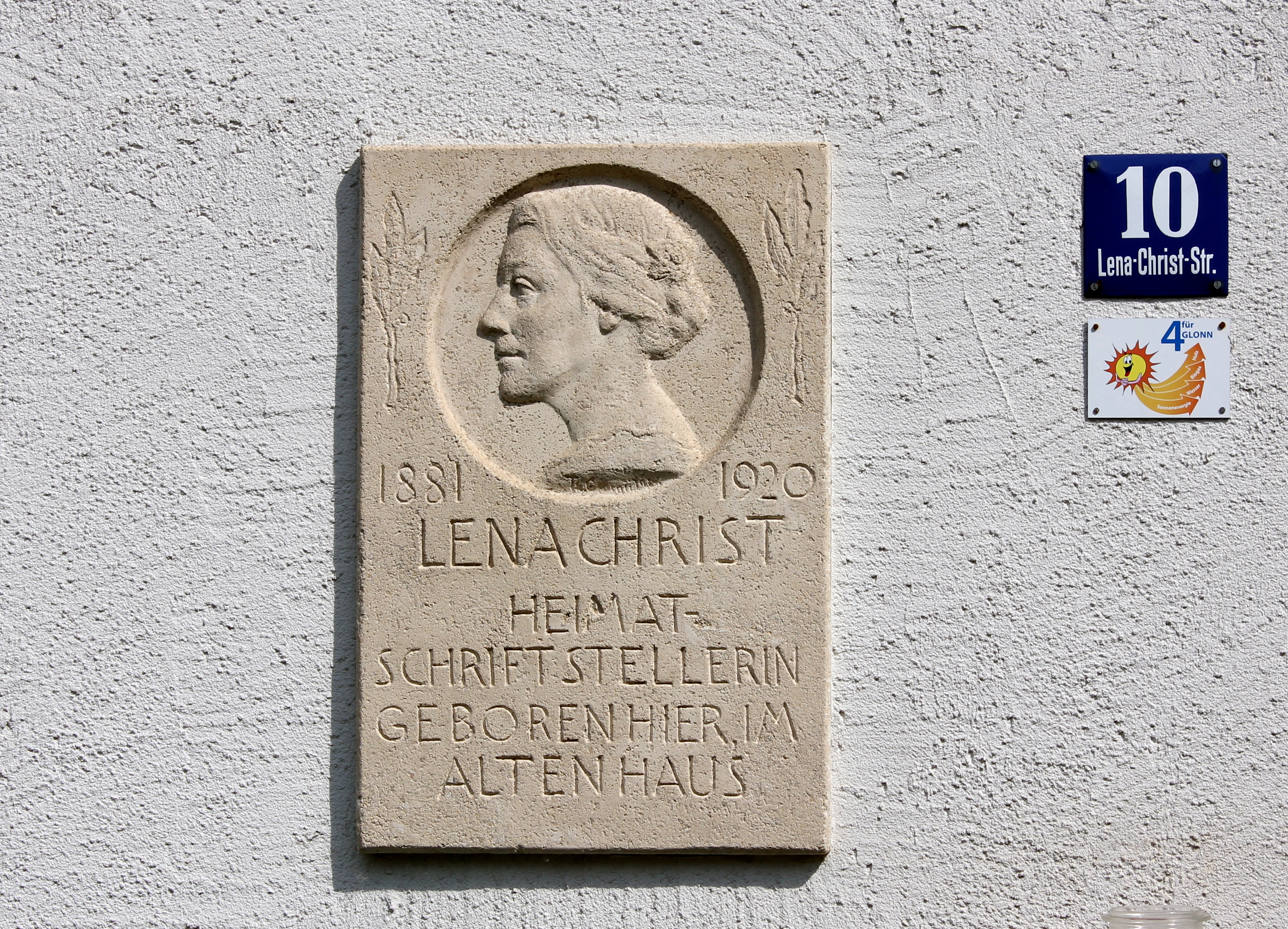
Lena Christ plaque at house of her birth in Glonn

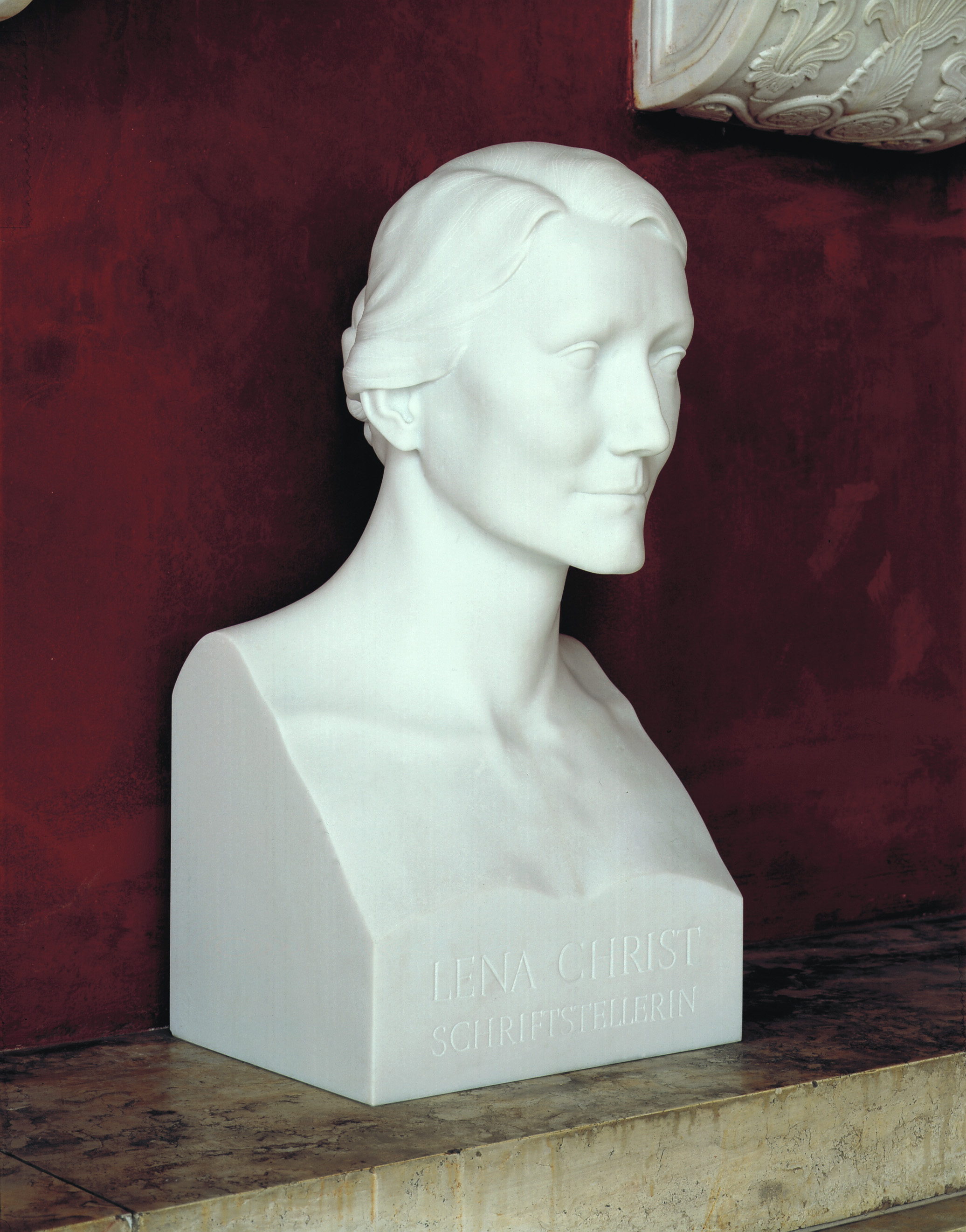
Marble bust of Lena Christ by Martin Kargruber in the Ruhmeshalle in Munich

Museum and exhibition

- The Heimatmuseum in Glonn (Glonn Homeland Museum) (Klosterweg 7) owns mementos and books of the writer.
- After Lena Christ's great-grandson Peter Dietz in 2010, after the death of her granddaughter, bequeathed the written inheritance to the Munich literary archive Monacensia, a great exhibition titled Lena Christ – die Glückssucherin (Lena Christ - seeker of happiness (Note: The German word "Glück" can mean "happiness", "fortune", or "luck".)) could be established in July 2012. It was arranged by curator Gunna Wendt.

Monuments

- A bust of Lena Christ is standing at the city hall of Glonn.
- At the decision of the Bavarian Council of Ministers in 1997, a bust of Lena Christ created by Martin Kargruber was placed in the Ruhmeshalle at the Theresienwiese in Munich on 3 April 2000.

Commemorative plaques

- At the house of her birth in Glonn a commemorative plaque was installed in 1921 by friends. For the new building a new plaque was created by Theodor Georgii.
- Plaques at two of her former residential houses in Munich (Sandstraße 45 and Linprunstraße 35) commemorate her.
- There is also a memory tablet in Landshut.

Lena Christ as eponym

- In her honour, the street in Glonn where she was born and grew up was named "Lena-Christ-Straße". The house of her birth, and the new building in its place, respectively, is number 10.
- Streets have been named after Lena Christ in other municipalities, too, e.g. in the Munich city quarter of Milbertshofen.
- A secondary school in Markt Schwaben (a town in the same district Ebersberg as the place of her birth, Glonn) is named "Lena-Christ-Realschule".
- The house in which she lived in Landshut for two years (Maximilianstraße 8), was named "Lena-Christ-Haus". A plaque commemorates the writer.
- Inside the guildhall of Germering a hall is named after her.
- The former inn "Neuwirt" in Glonn, directly opposite the house of her birth, had furnished a "Lena-Christ-Stüberl", which kept some memorabilia of the writer in a side room.

== Works ==
=== Books ===
- Gesammelte Werke. List-Verlag, 1997, ISBN 3-471-77244-8.
- Erinnerungen einer Überflüssigen. Albert Langen, München 1912
  - dtv, München 1999, ISBN 3-423-12657-4.
- Lausdirndlgeschichten. Martin Mörikes Verlag, 1913
  - 2. Auflage, Ehrenwirth, München 1983, ISBN 3-431-02423-8.
  - Allitera Verlag, München 2012, ISBN 978-3-86906-308-9.
- Mathias Bichler. Albert Langen, München 1914.
  - dtv, München 1989, ISBN 3-423-11035-X.
  - Allitera Verlag, München 2012, ISBN 978-3-86906-302-7.
- Unsere Bayern anno 14. Part One. Albert Langen, München 1914.
  - Allitera Verlag, München 2014, ISBN 978-3-86906-620-2.
- Unsere Bayern anno 14/15. Part Two. Albert Langen, München 1915.
- Unsere Bayern anno 14/15. Part Three. Albert Langen, München 1915.
- Die Rumplhanni Albert Langen, München 1916.
  - dtv, München 1988, ISBN 3-423-10904-1.
- Bauern Bayerische Geschichten. Paul List Verlag, Leipzig 1919.
  - dtv, München 1990, ISBN 3-423-11169-0.
- Madam Bäuerin. Paul List Verlag, Leipzig 1920.
  - dtv, München 1989, ISBN 3-423-11089-9.
  - Allitera Verlag, München 2012, ISBN 978-3-86906-301-0.
- Liebesgeschichten. Allitera Verlag, München 2012, ISBN 978-3-86906-309-6.

=== Film adaptions ===
- Der Fall Lena Christ. (TV-D, 1970), directed by Hans W. Geissendörfer, with Eberhard Peiker, Paul Stieber-Walter, Sofie Strehlow, Heidi Stroh et al.
- Die Rumplhanni. (TV-D, 1981) by director Rainer Wolffhardt, with Monika Baumgartner, Karl Obermayr, Enzi Fuchs, Hansi Kraus et al.
- Madame Bäurin. (D, 1993) by director Franz Xaver Bogner, with Julia Stemberger, Francis Fulton-Smith, Hanna Schygulla, Franz Xaver Kroetz et al.

== Audio drama ==
- Erinnerungen einer Überflüssigen. Directed by Stefanie Ramb. Bayern 2. 2020.

=== Audio books ===
- Die Rumplhanni. With Eva Sixt, Rüdiger Hacker, Gerd Burger, Tanja Raith, Karin Thaller, Matthias Winter, Hans Schröck et al. Directed by Dieter Lohr. LOhrBär-Verlag 2014, ISBN 978-3-939529-13-2.

== Literature ==
- Ghemela Adler: Heimatsuche und Identität. Das Werk der bairischen Schriftstellerin Lena Christ (= Europäische Hochschulschriften, Reihe 1, Deutsche Sprache und Literatur. Band 1261). Lang, Frankfurt am Main 1991, ISBN 3-631-42869-3.
- Günter Goepfert: Das Schicksal der Lena Christ. Revised and expanded edition. Rosenheimer Verlag, Rosenheim 2004, ISBN 3-475-53520-3.
- Edgar Hederer (1957). "Christ, Lena". Neue Deutsche Biographie (in German). Vol. 3. Berlin: Duncker & Humblot. p. 218. (full text online).
- Michaela Karl: Lena Christ. Die Überflüssige. In: Michaela Karl: Bayerische Amazonen. 12 Porträts. Pustet, Regensburg 2004, ISBN 3-7917-1868-1, pp. 66–83.
- Hans Obermair: Lena Christ und Glonn. Herkunft und Wurzeln. Kulturverein Glonn, Glonn 2006.
- Marita Panzer: Lena Christ. Keine Überflüssige. Pustet-Verlag, Regensburg 2011, ISBN 978-3-7917-2307-5.
- Herta-Elisabeth Renk: Die Überflüssige und ihre Heimat. Zu Leben und Werk der Lena Christ. In: Albrecht Weber (ed.): Handbuch der Literatur in Bayern. Vom Frühmittelalter bis zur Gegenwart. Pustet, Regensburg 1987, ISBN 3-7917-1042-7, pp. 373–385.
- Asta Scheib: In den Gärten des Herzens. Die Leidenschaft der Lena Christ. Hoffmann u. Campe, Hamburg 2002, ISBN 3-455-06495-7.
- Gunna Wendt: Lena Christ. Die Glückssucherin. LangenMüller, München 2012, ISBN 978-3-7844-3289-2.
- Reinhard Wittmann: Lena Christ. In: Katharina Weigand (ed.): Große Gestalten der bayerischen Geschichte. Herbert Utz Verlag, München 2011, ISBN 978-3-8316-0949-9.
