= Pliening =

- Municipality
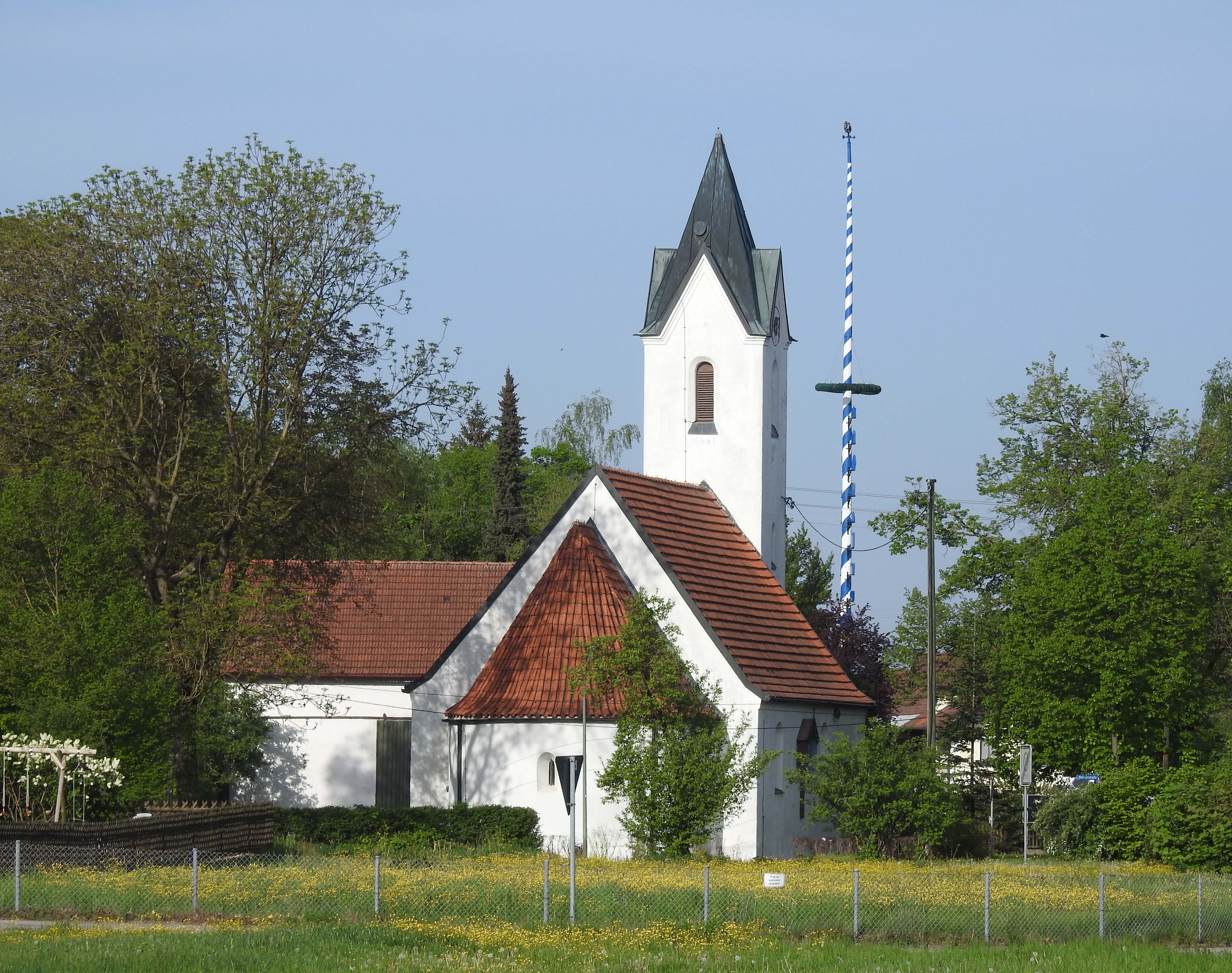
- Church of the Holy Cros

- Coat of arms

- Location of Pliening within Ebersberg district
- Interactive map of Pliening
- Location within Germany Location within Bavaria
- Coordinates: 48°12′N 11°48′E
- Country: Germany
- State: Bavaria
- Admin. region: Oberbayern
- District: Ebersberg
- Subdivisions: 4 Ortsteile

Government
  - Mayor (2020–26): Roland Frick (CSU)

Area
  - Total: 22.79 km^{2} (8.80 sq mi)
- Elevation: 504 m (1,654 ft)

Population (2025-12-31)
  - Total: 5,957
  - Density: 261.4/km^{2} (677.0/sq mi)
- Time zone: UTC+01:00 (CET)
  - Summer (DST): UTC+02:00 (CEST)
- Postal codes: 85652
- Dialling codes: 08121 089 (Landsham, Gerharding)
- Vehicle registration: EBE
- Website: www.pliening.de

Pliening (German pronunciation: [ˈpliːnɪŋ]) is a community east of Munich in the northwest of the district of Ebersberg in the Regierungsbezirk of Upper Bavaria, Germany. In the local dialect, the name is pronounced Pleaning. It has flourished in recent decades, partly as a commuter base for Munich, located some 20 km to the west. The official population level had reached 5,263 by 2006.

== Coat of arms ==
The community's arms consist of a shield divided into three. Uppermost in the shield are two coloured bars, black on the right and gold on the left. Below this are three crowns on a blue background. The lowest and biggest part of the shield is taken up by a black bear on a silver background.

== History ==
Sporadic prehistoric finds in the community point to the area's having been settled since the New Stone Age.

In the Bronze Age a small settlement arose on a strip of grassland between the woods in the community's south end and the moor in the north. Sheep raising was the settlers’ main livelihood.

The later settlement – between 850 BC and AD 50 – is believed to have been established by the Celtic Hallstatt culture, which has been shown by ceramic finds. As this settlement developed, the at first loose structure shifted to a much tighter village structure. After southern Germany was conquered by the Romans about AD 50, the area became part of the Roman Empire. Some finds in the area also point to a Roman presence.

The Völkerwanderung, beginning about AD 400, brought with it new settlers: the Germanic stock of the Bavarii put down roots here. Also, a small Alemannic tribe settled in the area. Results of aerial archaeological photography show loose, scattered settlement.

Under Gothic rule, political relations stabilized. The noble alemannic tribal leader Pleonunc became his village's namesake. The three “original yards” (Urhöfe) of Sellmayr, Wunsam and Wolfram stem from Pleonunc's time.

About 700, the area was Christianized. The first church was built about 1000.

=== Pliening ===
Pliening grew out of the yard at Gelting. Until some time in the 14th century, it was called "Moospliening" to distinguish it from the older "Kirchpliening". Over time, the placename "Pliening" came to be used ever more often for the more westerly of the two places. Lying advantageously on the road between Erding and Munich, the community saw quick development in modern times.

Currently, a ringroad around Gelting, Pliening and Landsham is being planned, which has unsettled retailers in the community of Pliening, as it is seen as potentially disruptive to their livelihoods. Where funding for this new road will come from is also still very much an open question.

=== Gelting ===
Gelting is a fusion of two older places: the southern part, known from documentary evidence to be older, and the northern part, Gelting. The southern part, once known as "Kirchpliening", consisted even into the Middle Ages only of the church and the original “yard” (nowadays known as Zehmerhof). Over the centuries, the simple day labourers acquired houses, whereby the southern part of the village became more heavily populated. This south end is said to be the actual Pliening, and was founded by the Allemannic settler Pleon, whose tribe came originally from the Neckar area. In 813, the noble priest Cundhart donated parts of his estate "nahe bei Pleoningas" (“near Pliening”) to the Bishop of Freising and built a church there, which is said to be the current church's forerunner.

The northern part of Gelting, the actual Gelting, had its first documentary mention in 855 and is said to have been founded by someone named Gelto. It has not been fully established where he came from. The name could be a corruption of the name "Kelto" (which could point to an old Celtic settlement), or Gelto might have been among Pleon's kin, and founded a settlement near his cousin's.

=== Landsham ===
In the 19th and 20th centuries the Parish of Landsham was a branch of St. Andrew's Parish ("Pfarrei St. Andreas") in Kirchheim. For a long time, schoolchildren went to school in Kirchheim. Furthermore, a commercial-industrial park was built in Landsham in the 1990s, which has become the community's main income source.

=== Offices ===
- Allgemeine Verwaltung der Gemeinde Pliening (Community administration)
- Bauamt der Gemeinde Pliening (Building office)
- Öffentliche Sicherheit und Ordnung, Personenstandswesen der Gemeinde Pliening (Public safety and order, civil status)
- Finanzverwaltung der Gemeinde Pliening (Financial administration)

== Constituent communities ==
The community of Pliening consists of the main centres of Pliening, Gelting, Landsham, Landsham-Moos and Ottersberg as well as the hamlets and uninhabited places of Geltinger Au, Unterspann, Gigging, Gerharding and Erlmühle.

== Famous people ==
- Franz Xaver Bogner (1949- ), film director
- Hans Schuler (1958- ), actor
- Karin Ertl (1974- ), athlete
