= Karl Ludwig Schweisfurth =

German businessman (1930–2020)

Karl Ludwig Schweisfurth (30 July 1930 – 15 February 2020) was a German entrepreneur, founder of the Schweisfurth Foundation and pioneer in the ecological production of food. He was the son of Karl Schweisfurth, who founded Herta Foods in 1902.

== Biography ==
Schweisfurth was born and died in Herten. He interned at industrial scale slaughter houses in Chicago and used his experiences to implement similar industrial food processing in his father's company. This allowed Herta Foods to develop from a small business to Europe's largest meat processing company, processing 25.000 pigs and 5.000 cattle on a weekly basis.

After it became evident that neither of his sons or his daughter would take over leadership of the company, Schweisfurth sold Herta Foods to Nestlé in 1986. Shortly before this, in 1984, Karl Ludwig Schweisfurth had started a new food processing business that would treat animals along the guiding principles of the ecological production of food. This business is called "Herrmannsdorfer Landwerkstätten" and is located in the Bavarian town of Glonn. For Schweisfurth, his motivation for pioneering ecological farming was that "I suddenly realized that meat from tortured animals cannot be a nurturing source of food for us humans."
