= Baiern =

- Municipality
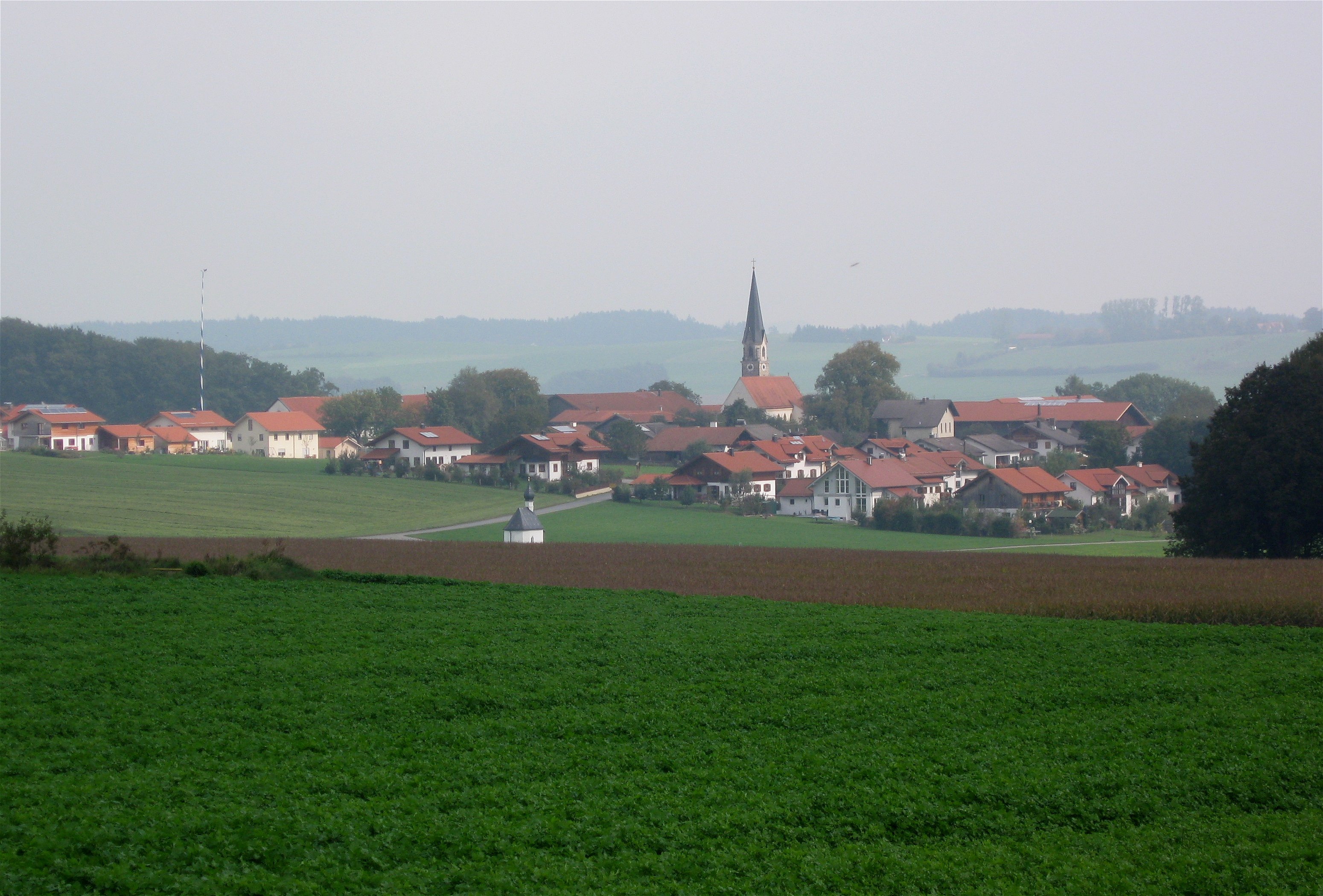
- Community Berganger in Baiern

- Coat of arms

- Location of Baiern within Ebersberg district
- Interactive map of Baiern
- Location within Germany Location within Bavaria
- Coordinates: 47°57′N 11°54′E
- Country: Germany
- State: Bavaria
- Admin. region: Oberbayern
- District: Ebersberg
- Municipal assoc.: Glonn

Government
  - Mayor (2018–24): Martin Riedl

Area
  - Total: 19.97 km^{2} (7.71 sq mi)
- Elevation: 590 m (1,940 ft)

Population (2025-12-31)
  - Total: 1,500
  - Density: 75/km^{2} (190/sq mi)
- Time zone: UTC+01:00 (CET)
  - Summer (DST): UTC+02:00 (CEST)
- Postal codes: 85625
- Dialling codes: 08093
- Vehicle registration: EBE
- Website: www.glonn.de

Baiern (German pronunciation: [ˈbaɪɐn]) is a community in the district of Ebersberg, Upper Bavaria, Germany. It is a member of the administrative community (Verwaltungsgemeinschaft) of Glonn.

The community's name is pronounced the same way as the German name for Bavaria ("Bayern"), although it is spelt differently. This is most likely derived from the old way of spelling Bavaria in German ("Baiern").

The constituent communities of Antholing, Berganger and Netterndorf are to be found within Baiern, as is the Jugenddorf Piusheim ("Youth Village of Piusheim").

== Geography ==
Baiern lies in the Munich region. It includes one traditional rural land unit – Gemarkung in German – also called Baiern.

== History ==
Baiern belonged to the Rentamt of Munich and the Court of Swabia of the Electorate of Bavaria. It was also the seat of a captaincy (Hauptmannschaft). The Weihenstephan Benedictine Monastery was until secularization in 1803 an important landlord in the community. With the municipal edict in 1818 came what is today the community of Baiern.

The painter Edgar Ende spent the last years of his life in a former schoolhouse in Netterndorf. He died there on 27 December 1965 and was buried at the graveyard in Antholing.

=== Population development ===
The community's land area was home to 986 inhabitants in 1970, 1048 in 1987 and 1402 in 2000.

== Politics ==
The community's tax revenue in 1999, converted into euros, was €349,000, of which €29,000 was from business taxes.

The community's mayor (Bürgermeister) is Martin Riedl, elected in 2018.

== Economy and infrastructure ==
In 1998, the fields of agriculture and forestry employed no workers on the social insurance contribution rolls. In industry it was 68 and in trade and transport none. In other fields of work there were 152. Also, 345 people on the aforesaid rolls worked from their homes. There were nine processing businesses. There were six businesses in contracting. Furthermore, in 1999, there were 61 agricultural businesses with a total productive land area of 1 546 ha, of which 466 ha was cropland and the other 1 078 ha was meadowland.

== Education ==
In 1999, the following institutions could be found in Baiern:

- Kindergartens: 50 Kindergarten places with 50 children
