= Aßling (Verwaltungsgemeinschaft) =

- Verwaltungsgemeinschaft
- Location of Aßling within Ebersberg district
- Interactive map of Aßling
- Location within Germany Location within Bavaria
- Coordinates: 48°00′N 12°00′E
- Country: Germany
- State: Bavaria
- Admin. region: Upper Bavaria
- District: Ebersberg
- Seat: Aßling
- Subdivisions: 3 municipalities

Area
  - Total: 71.29 km^{2} (27.53 sq mi)

Population (2025-12-31)
  - Total: 7,537
  - Density: 105.7/km^{2} (273.8/sq mi)
- Time zone: UTC+01:00 (CET)
  - Summer (DST): UTC+02:00 (CEST)
- Website: www.vg-assling.de

Aßling is a Verwaltungsgemeinschaft (municipal association) in the district of Ebersberg in Bavaria, Germany. Its seat is in Aßling.

It consists of the following municipalities:

1. Aßling
2. Emmering
3. Frauenneuharting
