= Herta Foods =

German frankfurter brand owned by Nestlé

Herta Frankfurters
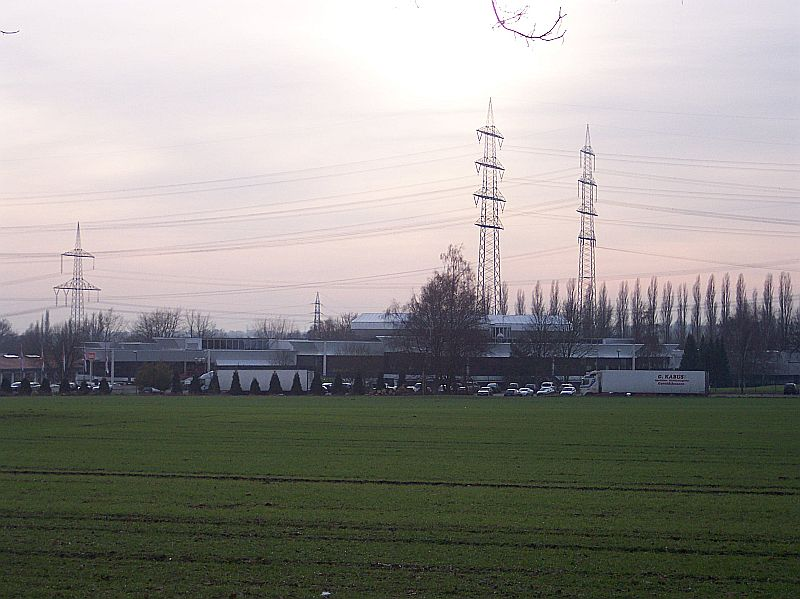
- Product type: Precooked meal, Frankfurter
- Current owner: Casa Tarradellas
- Country: Germany
- Introduced: 1902?
- Markets: Europe
- Previous owners: Nestlé
- Website: Herta Frankfurters

Herta is a brand of pre-cooked Frankfurters, owned by Casa Tarradellas since 2025.

== History ==
Ludwig Schweisfurth opened a butcher shop in the German town of Herten, from where the name Herta originates, in 1902. This local shop flourished and grew into a factory. By 1963, Herta had spread across Europe, and was sold to Nestlé by Karl Ludwig Schweisfurth in 1986. Nestlé later launched the Herta brand in the UK in 1988, and had become the most popular frankfurter brand by 2000, selling over 150 million. In December 2019, Nestlé announced that they had sold 60% of their shares to Casa Tarradellas. In December 2025, Nestlé sold the other 40%.
