= Glonn (Verwaltungsgemeinschaft) =

- Verwaltungsgemeinschaft
- Location of Glonn within Ebersberg district
- Interactive map of Glonn
- Location within Germany Location within Bavaria
- Coordinates: 47°59′N 11°52′E
- Country: Germany
- State: Bavaria
- Admin. region: Upper Bavaria
- District: Ebersberg
- Seat: Glonn
- Subdivisions: 6 municipalities

Area
  - Total: 127.63 km^{2} (49.28 sq mi)

Population (2025-12-31)
  - Total: 14,118
  - Density: 110.62/km^{2} (286.50/sq mi)
- Time zone: UTC+01:00 (CET)
  - Summer (DST): UTC+02:00 (CEST)
- Website: www.vg-glonn.de

Glonn is a Verwaltungsgemeinschaft (municipal association) in the district of Ebersberg in Bavaria, Germany. Its seat is in Glonn.

It consists of the following municipalities:

1. Baiern
2. Bruck
3. Egmating
4. Glonn
5. Moosach
6. Oberpframmern
