= Egmating =

- Municipality
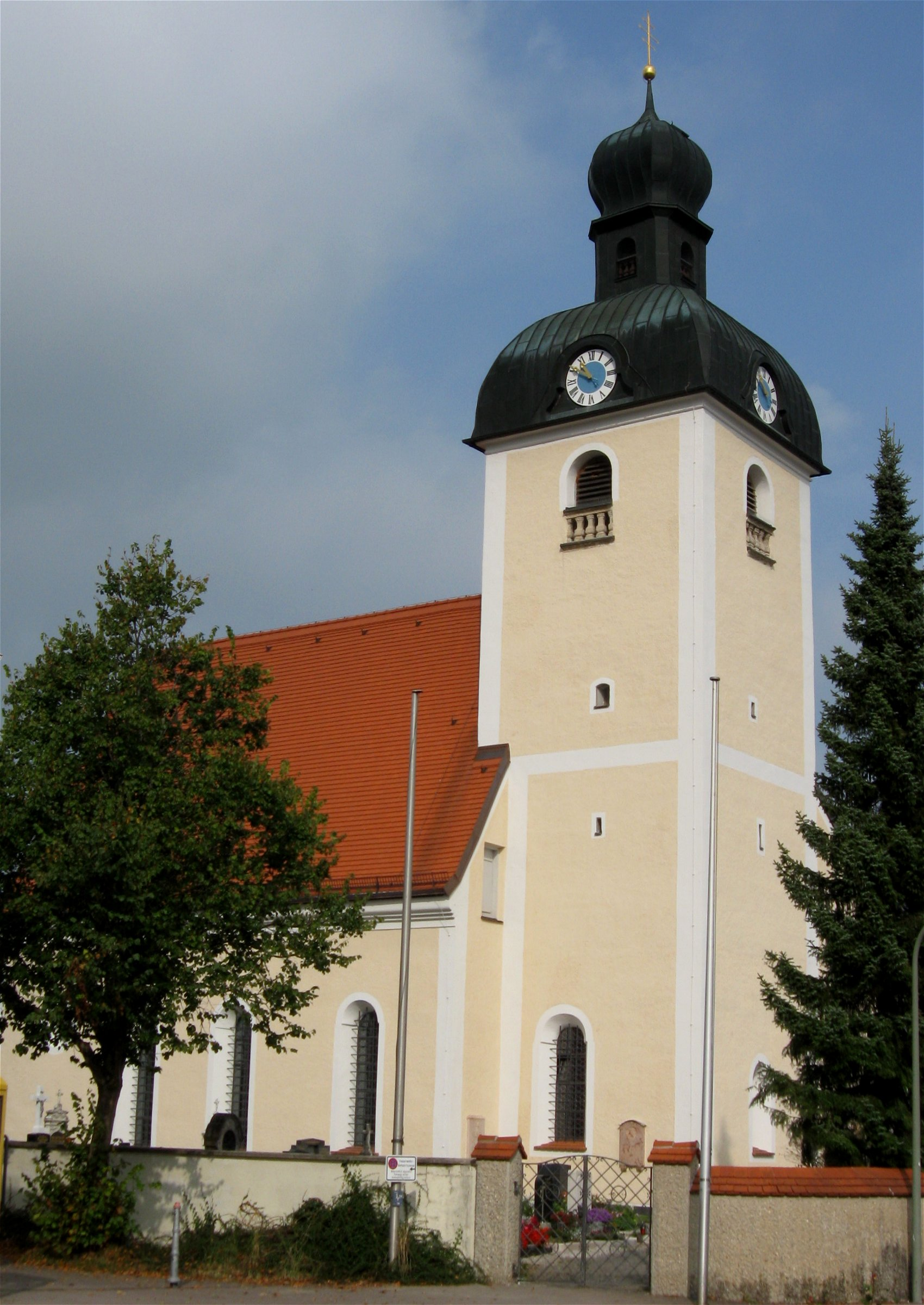
- Church of Saints John Baptist and Michael

- Coat of arms

- Location of Egmating within Ebersberg district
- Interactive map of Egmating
- Location within Germany Location within Bavaria
- Coordinates: 48°0′N 11°48′E
- Country: Germany
- State: Bavaria
- Admin. region: Oberbayern
- District: Ebersberg
- Municipal assoc.: Glonn

Government
  - Mayor (2020–26): Ingeborg Heiler

Area
  - Total: 19.16 km^{2} (7.40 sq mi)
- Elevation: 620 m (2,030 ft)

Population (2025-12-31)
  - Total: 2,290
  - Density: 120/km^{2} (310/sq mi)
- Time zone: UTC+01:00 (CET)
  - Summer (DST): UTC+02:00 (CEST)
- Postal codes: 85658
- Dialling codes: 08095
- Vehicle registration: EBE
- Website: www.egmating.de

Egmating is a community in the Upper Bavarian district of Ebersberg in Germany. It is a member of the administrative community (Verwaltungsgemeinschaft) of Glonn.

== Geography ==
Egmating lies in the Munich region. It includes one traditional rural land unit – Gemarkung in German – also called Egmating.

The constituent communities of Orthofen, Neuorthofen, Lindach, Münster und Neumünster are to be found within Egmating.

== History ==
Egmating belonged to the Lord (Freiherr) of Hornstein. It was part of the Electorate of Bavaria and was a lordly estate.

=== Population development ===
The community’s land area was home to 1,180 inhabitants in 1970, 1,388 in 1987 and 1,639 in 2000.

== Politics ==
The community's mayor (Bürgermeister) is Ingeborg Heiler (Aktive Bürgerliste Egmating).

The community's tax revenue in 1999 was €765,000, of which €45,000 was from business taxes.

== Economy and infrastructure ==
In 1998, according to official statistics, the field of industry employed 25 workers on the social insurance contribution rolls. In transport and trade, however, there were none. Also, 547 people on the aforesaid rolls worked from their homes, and 77 were employed in other fields. There were four processing businesses. There were five businesses in contracting. Furthermore, in 1999, there were 38 agricultural businesses with a total productive land area of 744 ha, of which 494 ha was meadowland.

== Education ==
In 1999, the following institutions could be found in Egmating:

- Kindergartens: 50 Kindergarten places with 42 children
