= Bruck, Upper Bavaria =

Bruck
- Municipality
- Coat of arms

- Location of Bruck within Ebersberg district
- Interactive map of Bruck
- Location within Germany Location within Bavaria
- Coordinates: 48°1′N 11°55′E
- Country: Germany
- State: Bavaria
- Admin. region: Oberbayern
- District: Ebersberg
- Municipal assoc.: Glonn

Government
  - Mayor (2020–26): Josef Schwäbl (CSU)

Area
  - Total: 21.59 km^{2} (8.34 sq mi)
- Elevation: 513 m (1,683 ft)

Population (2025-12-31)
  - Total: 1,336
  - Density: 61.88/km^{2} (160.3/sq mi)
- Time zone: UTC+01:00 (CET)
  - Summer (DST): UTC+02:00 (CEST)
- Postal codes: 85567
- Dialling codes: 08093
- Vehicle registration: EBE
- Website: www.glonn.de

Bruck (German pronunciation: [bʁʊk]) is a community in the Upper Bavarian district of Ebersberg. It is a member of the municipal association (Verwaltungsgemeinschaft) of Glonn.

== Geography ==
Bruck lies in the Munich region. It includes one traditional rural land unit – Gemarkung in German – also called Bruck.

The constituent communities of Taglaching, Pienzenau, Alxing, Bauhof, Pullenhofen, Loch, Nebelberg, Schlipfhausen, Eichtling, Doblbach, Wildaching, Feichten, Hamburg, Einharting and Wildenholzen are to be found within Bruck.

== History ==
Bruck belonged to the Lord (Freiherr) of Pienzenau. It was part of the Electorate of Bavaria, belonging to the lordly estate of Wildenholzen. In 1818 the community of Bruck came into being.

=== Population development ===
The community's land area was home to 879 inhabitants in 1970, 908 in 1987 and 1047 in 2000.

== Politics ==
The community's mayor (Bürgermeister) is Josef Schwäbl (CSU).

The community's tax revenue in 1999, converted into euros, was €364,000, of which €102,000 was from business taxes.

== Economy and infrastructure ==
In 1998, the industries of agriculture and forestry employed no workers on the social insurance contribution rolls. In industry it was 21 and in trade and transport, none. Also, 285 people on the aforesaid rolls worked from their homes. There were five processing businesses. There was one business in contracting. Furthermore, in 1999, there were 62 agricultural businesses with a total productive land area of 1 478 ha, of which 903 ha was meadowland.

== Education ==
In 1999, the following institutions could be found in Bruck:

- Kindergartens: 50 kindergarten places with 47 children
- Elementary schools: Moosach elementary school has a branch school in the constituent community of Alxing.
