= Moosach =

- Municipality
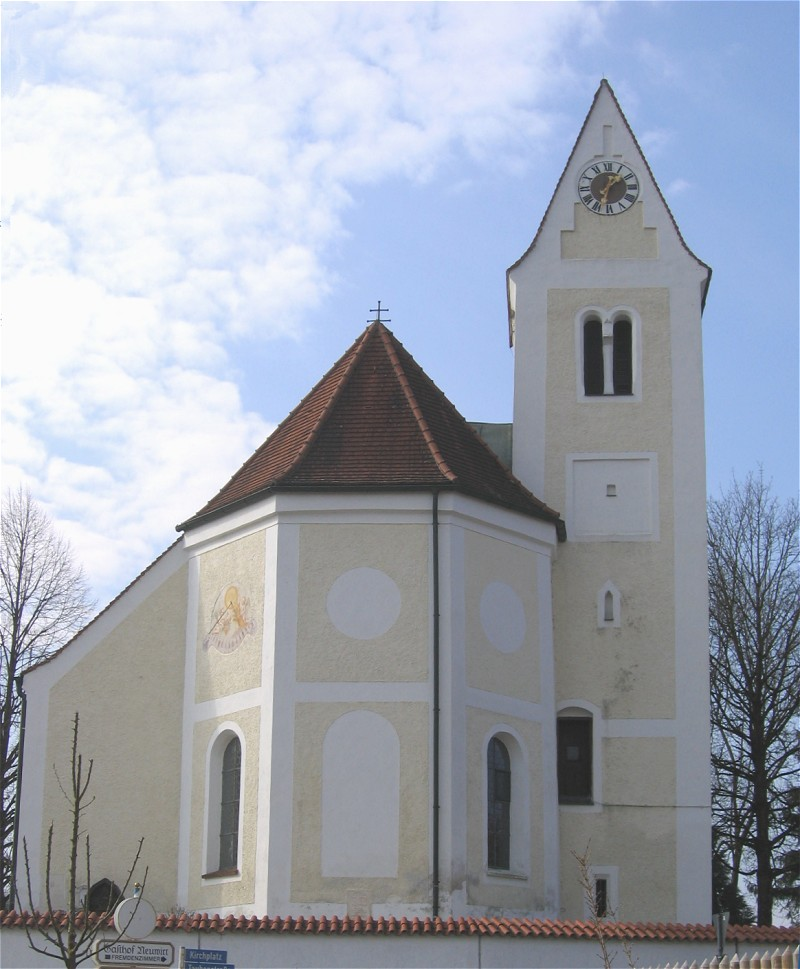
- Church of Saint Bartholomew

- Coat of arms

- Location of Moosach within Ebersberg district
- Interactive map of Moosach
- Location within Germany Location within Bavaria
- Coordinates: 48°2′N 11°53′E
- Country: Germany
- State: Bavaria
- Admin. region: Oberbayern
- District: Ebersberg
- Municipal assoc.: Glonn

Government
  - Mayor (2020–26): Michael Eisenschmid

Area
  - Total: 18.2 km^{2} (7.0 sq mi)
- Elevation: 529 m (1,736 ft)

Population (2025-12-31)
  - Total: 1,438
  - Density: 79.0/km^{2} (205/sq mi)
- Time zone: UTC+01:00 (CET)
  - Summer (DST): UTC+02:00 (CEST)
- Postal codes: 85665
- Dialling codes: 08091
- Vehicle registration: EBE
- Website: moosach.info

Moosach (German pronunciation: [ˈmoːzax]) is a municipality in the Upper Bavarian district of Ebersberg and a member of the Verwaltungsgemeinschaft (administrative community) of Glonn.

== Geography ==
The community lies in a picturesque setting in an ice-age moraine landscape about 500 m in elevation and lends itself well to hiking. In the heights of the moraine that ring the town are lakes, among them the Steinsee, a bathing lake also favoured by visitors from Munich. Somewhat further away lies the Kitzlsee, a protected landscape.

Moosach comprises a number of surrounding hamlets and lone homesteads such as Falkenberg (with a stable and a beergarden), Baumhau, Altenburg and Berghofen.

== History ==
In 1990, Moosach celebrated 1,200 years of existence, witnessed in a donation document of the Roman Catholic Archdiocese of Munich and Freising. The community's name goes back to the Moosach brook: "Ache flowing through the moss", Ache being a regional word meaning "swiftly flowing water". The Moosach rises from seven springs at the foot of the mountain on which stands the Kloster Maria Altenburg (monastery).

Moosach belonged to the Rentamt of Munich and the Court of Swabia of the Electorate of Bavaria. In the course of administrative reforms in Bavaria, the current community came into being with the community edict of 1818.

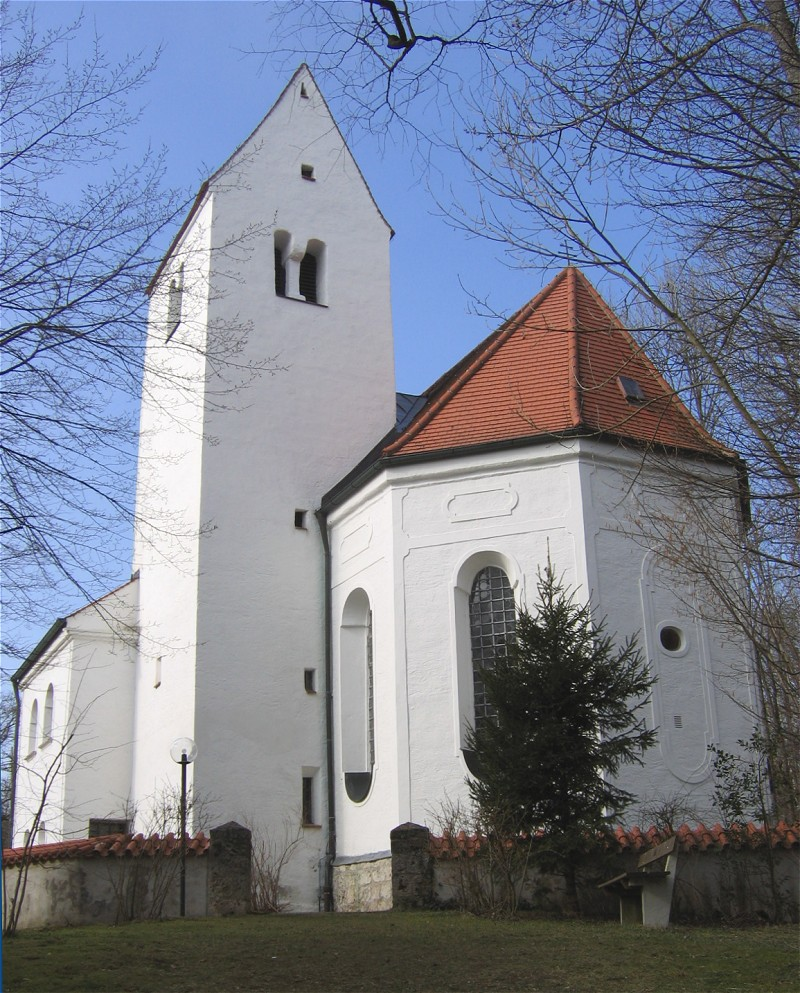
Maria Altenburg
