= Emmering, Ebersberg =

Emmering
- Municipality
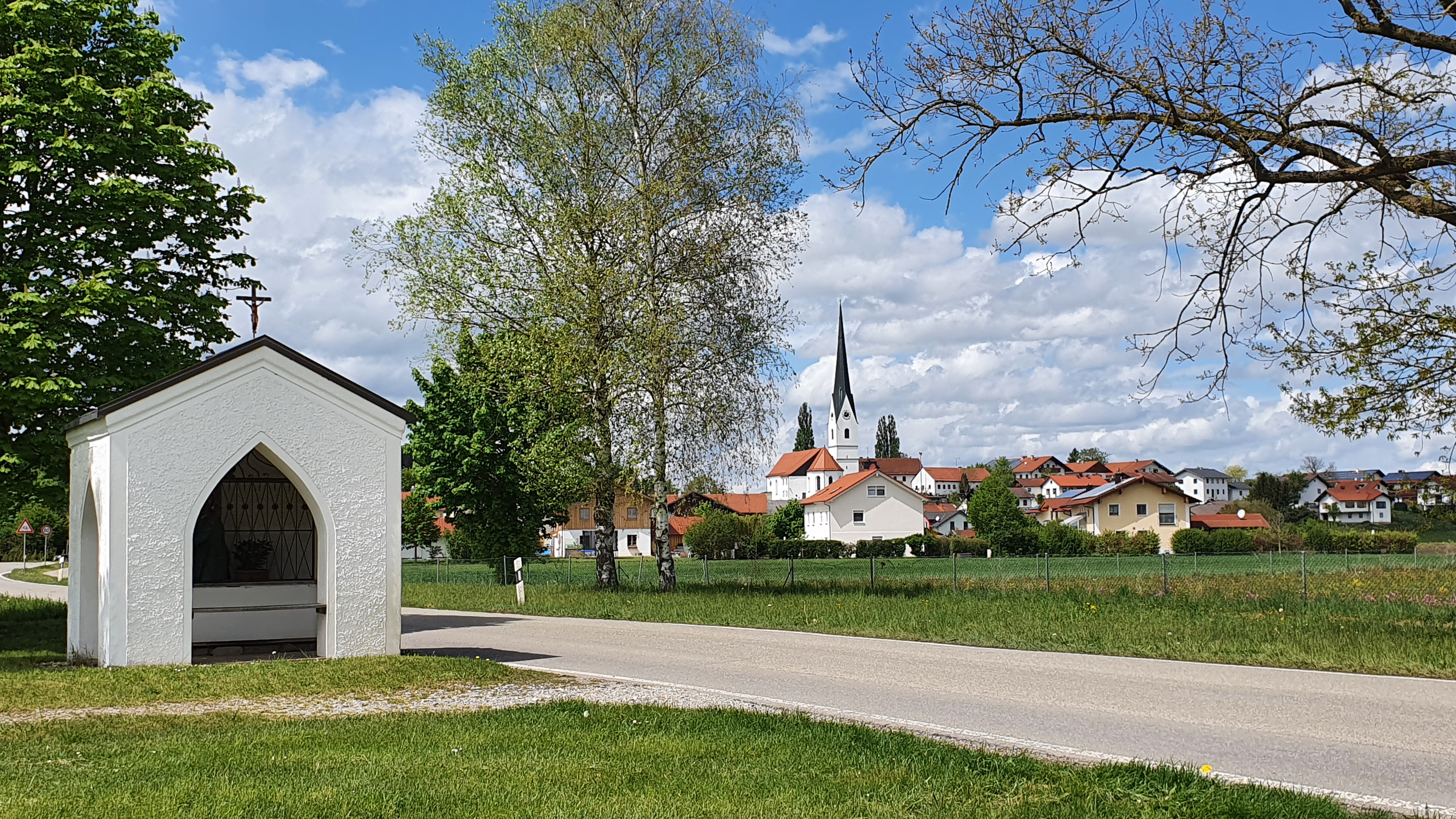
- Emmering: View from East

- Coat of arms

- Location of Emmering within Ebersberg district
- Interactive map of Emmering
- Location within Germany Location within Bavaria
- Coordinates: 48°0′N 12°3′E
- Country: Germany
- State: Bavaria
- Admin. region: Oberbayern
- District: Ebersberg
- Municipal assoc.: Aßling

Government
  - Mayor (2020–26): Claudia Streu-Schütze (FW)

Area
  - Total: 17.23 km^{2} (6.65 sq mi)
- Elevation: 515 m (1,690 ft)

Population (2025-12-31)
  - Total: 1,457
  - Density: 84.56/km^{2} (219.0/sq mi)
- Time zone: UTC+01:00 (CET)
  - Summer (DST): UTC+02:00 (CEST)
- Postal codes: 83550
- Dialling codes: 08039
- Vehicle registration: EBE

Emmering (German pronunciation: [ˈɛməʁɪŋ]) is a community in the Upper Bavarian district of Ebersberg. It is a member of the administrative community (Verwaltungsgemeinschaft) of Aßling.

== Geography ==
Emmering is located in the Munich region. It includes one traditional rural land unit – Gemarkung in German – also called Emmering.

== History ==
Emmering belonged to the Rentamt of Munich and the Court of Swabia of the Electorate of Bavaria. In the course of administrative reform in Bavaria, the current community came into being with the community edict of 1818.

=== Population development ===
Year	Inhabitants
1840	812
1871	822
1900	952
1925	1,110
1939	1,281
1950	1,725
1961	1,221
1970	1,219

Year	Inhabitants
1987	1,205
1991	1,223
1995	1,278
2000	1,291
2005	1,393
2010	1,440
2015	1,531
2020	1,486

== Politics ==
The community’s mayor (Bürgermeister) is Claudia Streu-Schütze (FWG Emmering).

The community’s tax revenue in 2018 was €1,169,000, of which €153,000 was from business taxes.

=== Coat of arms ===
Emmering’s arms might heraldically be described thus: In argent a chevron gules, above which two slanted hart’s antlers gules.

== Economy and infrastructure ==
According to official statistics, there were a total of 617 employees subject to social security contributions in 2018. Of these, 42 worked in the municipality in manufacturing, 19 in trade, transport, hospitality and 64 in other economic sectors. There were no processing businesses (with 20 or more employees) and 7 businesses in contracting. Furthermore, in 2016, there were 50 agricultural businesses with a total productive land area of 1,331 ha (5.14 sq mi), of which 837 ha (3.23 sq mi) was meadowland.

== Education ==
In 1999, the following institutions could be found in Emmering:

- Kindergartens: 50 Kindergarten places with 50 children
- Elementary school: branch of the elementary school in Aßling
