= Frauenneuharting =

- Municipality
- Coat of arms

- Location of Frauenneuharting within Ebersberg district
- Interactive map of Frauenneuharting
- Location within Germany Location within Bavaria
- Coordinates: 48°2′N 12°3′E
- Country: Germany
- State: Bavaria
- Admin. region: Oberbayern
- District: Ebersberg
- Municipal assoc.: Aßling

Government
  - Mayor (2020–26): Eduard Koch

Area
  - Total: 22.68 km^{2} (8.76 sq mi)
- Elevation: 530 m (1,740 ft)

Population (2025-12-31)
  - Total: 1,535
  - Density: 67.68/km^{2} (175.3/sq mi)
- Time zone: UTC+01:00 (CET)
  - Summer (DST): UTC+02:00 (CEST)
- Postal codes: 83553, 83565
- Dialling codes: 08092
- Vehicle registration: EBE

Frauenneuharting is a community in the district of Ebersberg in Upper Bavaria and a member of the administrative community of Aßling.

== Geography ==
Frauenneuharting lies in the Munich planning region.

=== Constituent communities ===
- Aichat
- Alme
- Anger
- Baumberg
- Biebing
- Buch
- Eichbichl
- Eschenloh
- Gersdorf
- Graben
- Großaschau
- Hagenberg
- Haging
- Halbeis
- Haus
- Heimgarten
- Hochholz
- Höhenberg
- Hungerberg
- Jakobneuharting
- Kleinaschau
- Knogl
- Lacke
- Lauterbach
- Lindach
- Moosen
- Oed
- Raunstädt
- Reith
- Ried
- Schaurach
- Spezigraben
- Stachet
- Tegernau
- Wimpersing

== History ==
About 1000 the church in Frauenneuharting was consecrated. The Catholic Parish Church of the Visitation (Katholische Pfarrkirche Mariä Heimsuchung) in Frauenneuharting was originally built in the Late Gothic style, but was given a Baroque makeover in 1632. Frauenneuharting belonged to the Rentamt of Munich and the Court of Swabia of the Electorate of Bavaria and was the seat of a captaincy (Hauptmannschaft). The Lords of Pienzenau were as landowners connected with Jakobneuharting, the earlier Neuharting, and the surrounding centres from 1381 to 1800. In the course of administrative reform in Bavaria, the current community came into being with the community edict in 1818.

=== Population development ===
The community’s land area was home to 1,079 inhabitants in 1970, 1,115 in 1987 and 1,314 in 2000.

== Politics ==
The community’s mayor (Bürgermeister) is Eduard Koch (Wählergemeinschaft Frauenneuharting), re-elected in 2020.

The community’s tax revenue in 1999, converted to euros, was €500,000, of which €112,000 was from business taxes.

== Economy and infrastructure ==
According to official statistics, 131 people on the social insurance contribution rolls were employed in industry it was 227 and in trade and transport none. In other fields, 12 people on the aforesaid rolls were employed, and 409 worked from their homes. There was one processing business. There were 4 businesses in contracting. Furthermore, in 2003, there were 89 agricultural businesses with a productive area of 1 788 ha of which 531 ha was cropland and 1 253 ha was meadowland.

=== Education ===
In 1999 the following institutions could be found in Frauenneuharting:

- Kindergartens: 50 Kindergarten places with 51 children
- Elementary schools: 1 with 10 teachers and 165 pupils
