= Ebersberg (district) =

Coordinates: 48°05′N 11°55′E

- District
- Flag Coat of arms
- Country: Germany
- State: Bavaria
- Adm. region: Upper Bavaria
- Capital: Ebersberg

Government
  - District admin.: Robert Niedergesäß (CSU)

Area
  - Total: 549.3 km^{2} (212.1 sq mi)

Population (31 December 2025)
  - Total: 144,526
  - Density: 263.1/km^{2} (681.5/sq mi)
- Time zone: UTC+01:00 (CET)
  - Summer (DST): UTC+02:00 (CEST)
- Vehicle registration: EBE
- Website: www.lra-ebe.de

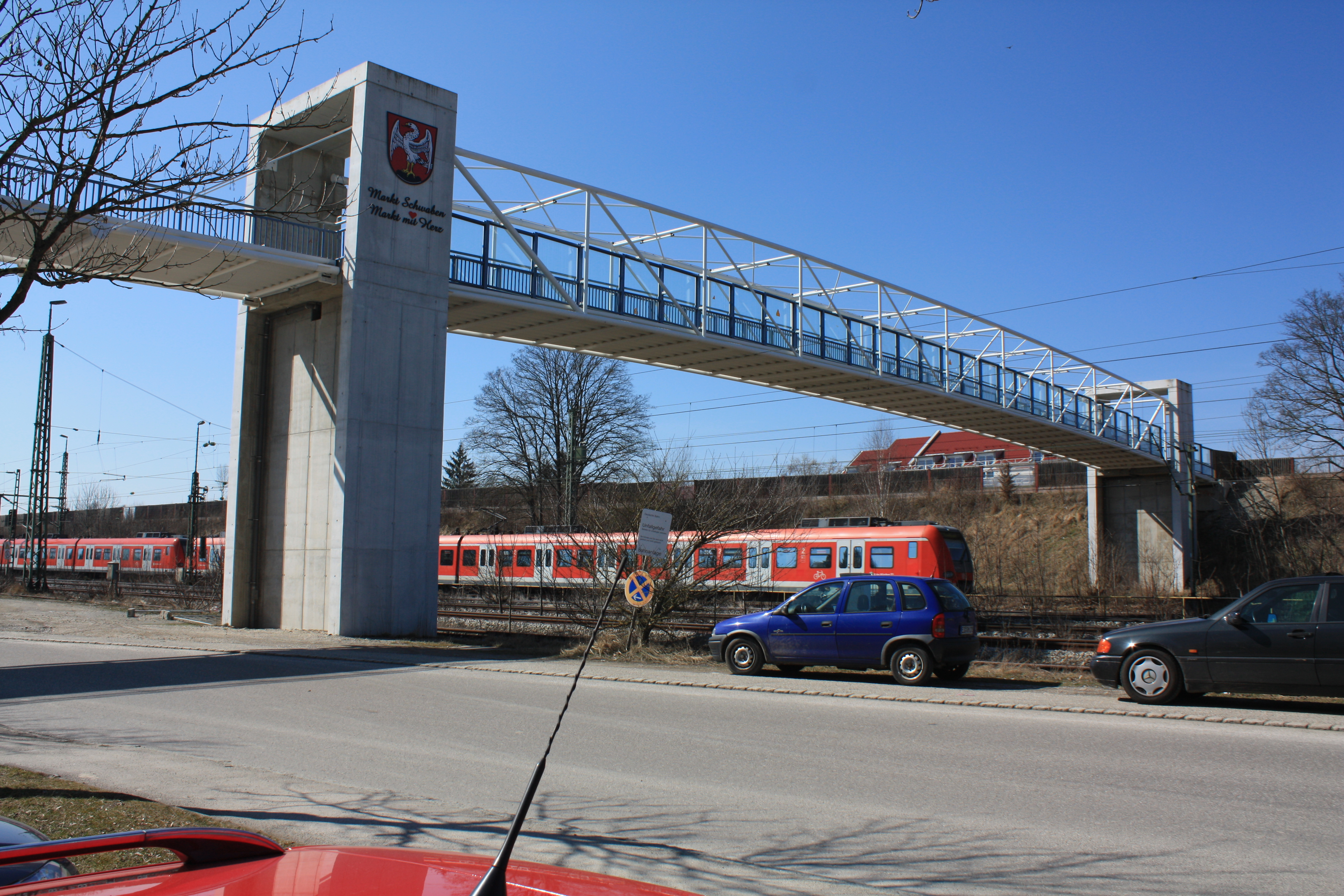
Footbridge over railways in Markt Schwaben, Bavaria, Germany. Coat of Arms of Markt Schwaben on the bridge

The district (Landkreis) of Ebersberg is located in Upper Bavaria, Germany. It is bounded by (from the north and clockwise) the districts of Erding, Mühldorf, Rosenheim and Munich.

== History ==
The most important event in the district's history was the battle of Hohenlinden on December 3, 1800, which was a part of the Napoleonic Wars.

== Geography ==
The district includes rural areas east of the city of Munich. Despite being in the vicinity of Munich, urbanisation is low. In the north there is a contiguous forest area of 80 km², serving as a recreation area for the population of the Bavarian capital. The forest consists of three separate unincorporated areas, Anzinger Forst, Ebersberger Forst, and Eglhartinger Forst.

== Coat of arms ==
The arms display both parts of the word "Ebersberg": a boar (German "Eber") standing on a mountain (German "Berg"). These two symbols are part of the arms of the city of Ebersberg as well. In addition the district's arms include a fir, symbolising the forests of the region.

== Towns and municipalities ==
Clickable map of towns and municipalities in the district

Towns
1. Ebersberg
2. Grafing
Märkte
1. Kirchseeon
2. Markt Schwaben
Municipalities
1. Anzing
2. Forstinning
3. Hohenlinden
4. Pliening
5. Poing
6. Steinhöring
7. Vaterstetten
8. Zorneding

Verwaltungsgemeinschaften
1. Aßling; 1. Aßling^{1}; 2. Emmering; 3. Frauenneuharting	2. Glonn; 1. Baiern; 2. Bruck; 3. Egmating; 4. Glonn^{1,2}; 5. Moosach; 6. Oberpframmern
^{1}seat of the Verwaltungsgemeinschaft; ^{2}Markt

Unincorporated Areas

1. Anzinger Forst
2. Ebersberger Forst
3. Eglhartinger Forst
