= Oberpframmern =

- Municipality
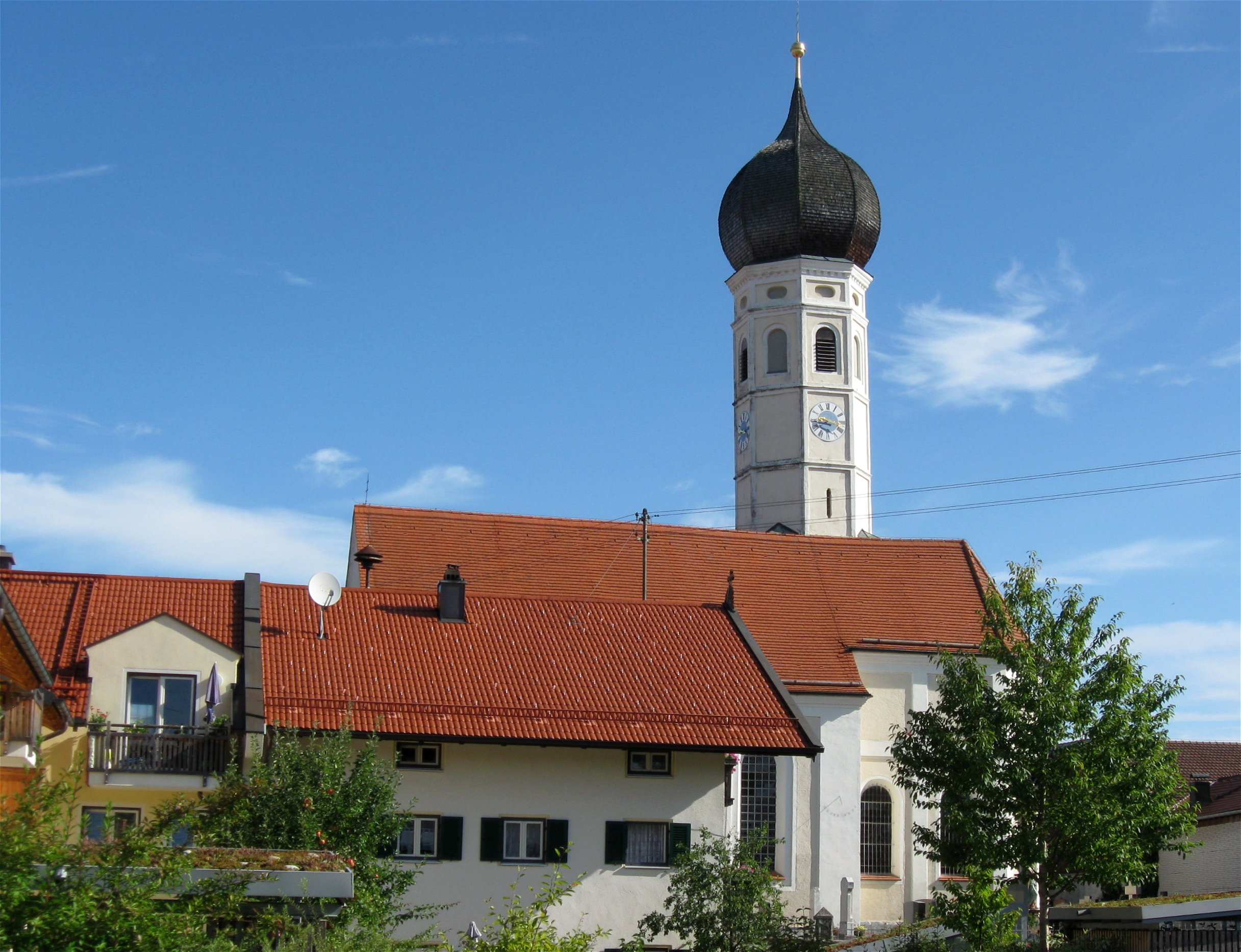
- Church of Saint Andrew

- Coat of arms

- Location of Oberpframmern within Ebersberg district
- Interactive map of Oberpframmern
- Location within Germany Location within Bavaria
- Coordinates: 48°1′N 11°49′E
- Country: Germany
- State: Bavaria
- Admin. region: Oberbayern
- District: Ebersberg
- Municipal assoc.: Glonn

Government
  - Mayor (2020–26): Andreas Lutz (CSU)

Area
  - Total: 18.47 km^{2} (7.13 sq mi)
- Elevation: 614 m (2,014 ft)

Population (2025-12-31)
  - Total: 2,468
  - Density: 133.6/km^{2} (346.1/sq mi)
- Time zone: UTC+01:00 (CET)
  - Summer (DST): UTC+02:00 (CEST)
- Postal codes: 85667
- Dialling codes: 08093
- Vehicle registration: EBE
- Website: www.oberpframmern.de

Oberpframmern is a community in the Upper Bavarian district of Ebersberg and a member of the Verwaltungsgemeinschaft (administrative community) of Glonn. It lies roughly 24 kilometres southeast of Munich.

== Geography ==
Oberpframmern lies in the Munich Region. It has only one traditional rural land unit (Gemarkung in German), also called Oberpframmern.

== History ==
Oberpframmern belonged to the Rentamt of Munich and the Court of Swabia of the Electorate of Bavaria. It was also seat of a captaincy (Hauptmannschaft).

=== Population development ===
In 1970, the community's land area was home to 1,179 inhabitants. In 1987 there were 1,522, and in 2000 there were 2,011.

== Politics ==
The mayor (Bürgermeister) is Andreas Lutz, re-elected in 2020.

The community's tax revenue in 1999, converted into euros, was €1,622,000 of which €605,000 was business taxes.

== Economy and infrastructure ==
According to official statistics, in 1998, 20 workers on the social insurance contribution rolls were employed in agriculture and forestry. In the industrial sector, it was 118 and in trade and transport 81. In other fields, 122 contributors were employed. Remote workers numbered 682. In processing industries there was one business, and in contracting three. Furthermore, in 1999 there were 25 businesses in agriculture with an area of 506 ha, of which 373 ha was meadowland.

=== Education ===
In 1999 the following institutions existed in Oberpframmern:

- Kindergarten: 100 kindergarten places with 90 children
- Elementary school: 1 with 12 teachers and 220 pupils
