= Tulling =

Village in Bavaria, Germany

Coordinates: 48.0822°N 12.0607°E

Tulling is a village with about 500 inhabitants to the east of the Bavarian capital Munich in the district (German "Landkreis") of Ebersberg.

== History ==
The first known written reference to the village of Tulling dates back to 825.

Politically, Tulling is part of the community of Steinhöring which is ruled by major Alois Hofstetter.

Most of the social life happens at the community centre was opened in 2008 by various local clubs (including the local stopselclub, music club, volunteer fire department, etc.).

The construction of a railway line from Wasserburg station through Tulling to Ebersberg, where it connected to the railway line via Grafing Bahnhof to Munich, was approved in March 1903. The official opening took place on 1 October 1905.
