= Grafing Stadt station =

Railway station in Grafing, Germany

Grafing Stadt
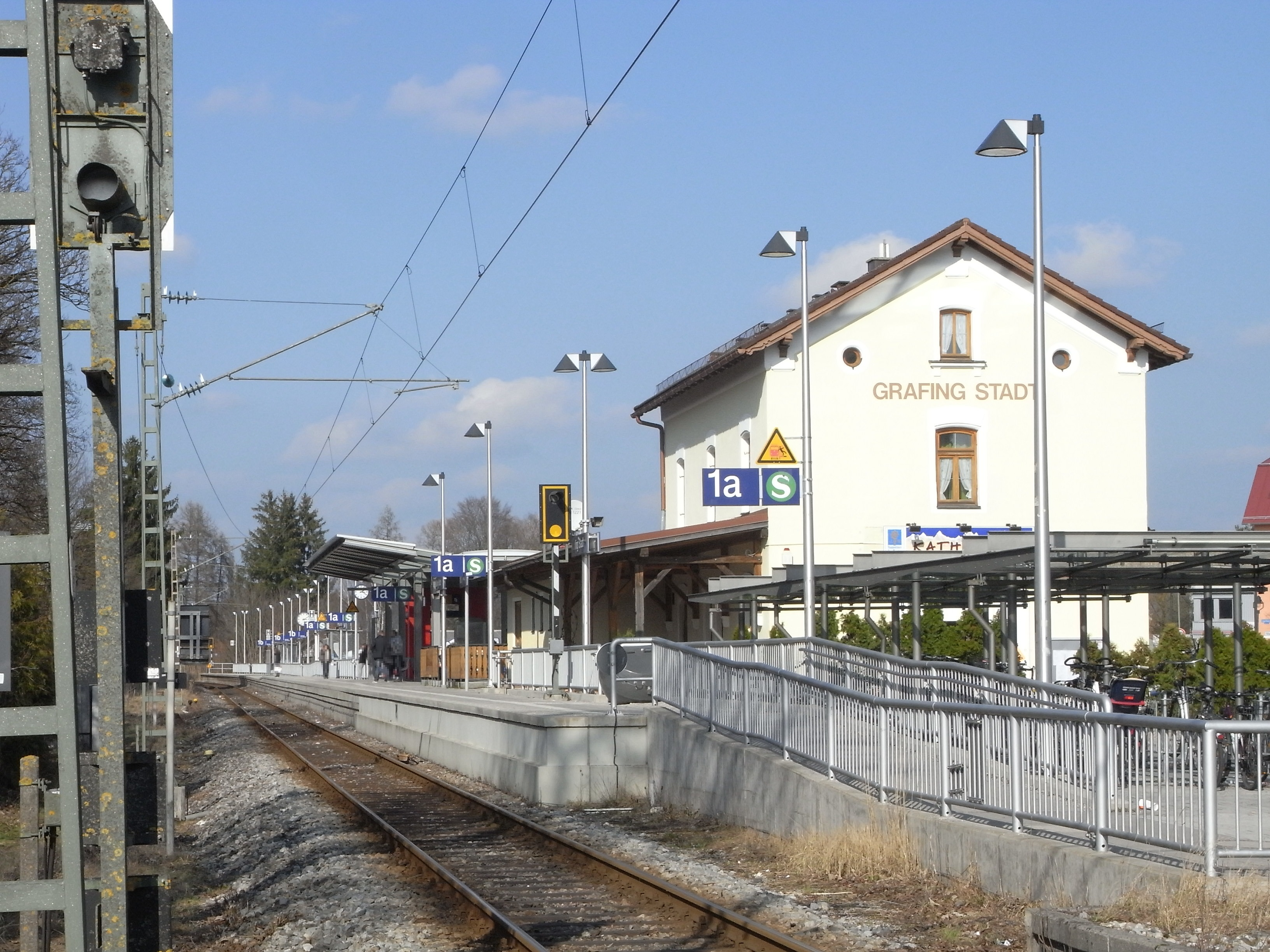

General information
- Location: Bahnhofsplatz 1; 85567 Grafing; Bavaria; Germany
- Coordinates: 48.0471°N 11.9628°E
- Owner: DB Netz
- Operator: DB Station&Service
- Line: Grafing–Wasserburg railway
- Platforms: 1 side platform
- Tracks: 1
- Train operators: S-Bahn München; Südostbayernbahn
- Connections: 345, 437, 440, 442, 444, 447, 448

Other information
- Station code: 2241
- DS100 code: MGRS
- IBNR: 8002348
- Category: 5
- Fare zone: : 3 and 4
- Website: www.bahnhof.de

History
- Opened: 12 November 1899; 126 years ago

Services
Preceding station		Following station
Grafing Bahnhof towards München Hbf	RB 48	Ebersberg towards Wasserburg (Inn)
Preceding station	Munich S-Bahn	Following station
Grafing Bahnhof towards Geltendorf	S4 selected trains only	Ebersberg Terminus
Grafing Bahnhof towards Tutzing	S6	Ebersberg Terminus
Location
- Location within Bavaria Location within Germany Location within Europe

Grafing Stadt station is a railway station in the municipality of Grafing, located in the Ebersberg district in Upper Bavaria, Germany.
