= Ebersberg station =

Railway station in Germany

Ebersberg (Oberbay)
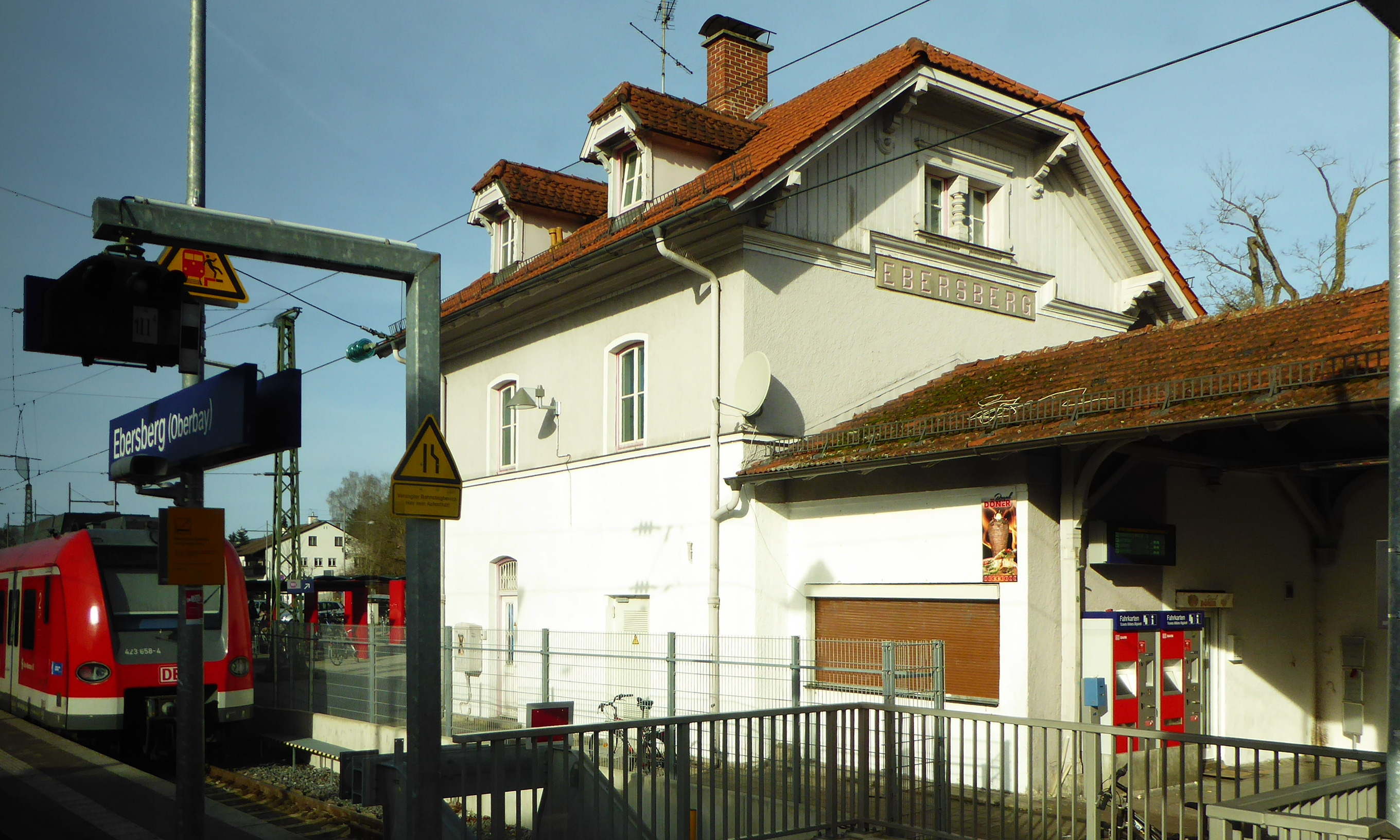

General information
- Location: Bahnhofsplatz; 85238 Ebersberg; Bavaria; Germany
- Coordinates: 48.0750°N 11.9705°E
- Owner: Deutsche Bahn
- Operator: DB Netz; DB Station&Service
- Line: Grafing–Wasserburg railway
- Platforms: 1
- Tracks: 2
- Train operators: S-Bahn München; Südostbayernbahn
- Connections: 437, 440, 442, 445, 446, 448, 469

Construction
- Accessible: Yes

Other information
- Station code: 1440
- DS100 code: MEG
- IBNR: 8001634
- Category: 4
- Fare zone: : 3 and 4
- Website: www.bahnhof.de

History
- Opened: 12 November 1899; 126 years ago

Services
Preceding station		Following station
Grafing Stadt towards München Hbf	RB 48	Steinhöring towards Wasserburg (Inn)
Preceding station	Munich S-Bahn	Following station
Grafing Stadt towards Geltendorf	S4 selected trains only	Terminus
Grafing Stadt towards Tutzing	S6	Terminus
Location
- Location within Bavaria Location within Germany Location within Europe

Ebersberg station is a railway station in the municipality of Ebersberg, located in the Ebersberg district in Upper Bavaria, Germany.

The station is called "Ebersberg (Oberbay) Bf" for regional trains except S-train. The name within the S-train system is "Ebersberg".
