= 2016 Munich knife attack =

Mass stabbing in Grafing, Germany

- Location: Grafing, Bavaria, Germany
- Date: 10 May 2016; 04:50 CEST (UTC+2)
- Attack type: Mass stabbing
- Weapon: Knife
- Deaths: 1
- Injuries: 3
- Perpetrator: Paul H.

On 10 May 2016, a mass stabbing occurred at the train station of Grafing, a suburb of Munich, Germany. One person was killed and three others injured. The perpetrator, a 27-year-old German man, was arrested. In August 2017, the Munich II District Court (Landgericht München II) ruled that the man was not criminally liable for the crime and committed him to a closed psychiatric facility.

The case briefly gained international attention as a potential terrorist attack, as the perpetrator had shouted "Allahu Akbar", although it was later revealed that he had no Islamist background and an extensive record for mental illness. Although German media reported that there was no evidence for a political or religious motive hours after the stabbing, misinformation spread on social media. The right-wing Alternative for Germany (AfD) party accused police of a cover-up and falsely attributed the stabbing to a convicted Islamist who had died the previous year.

== Background ==
English language media most commonly describe the stabbing as taking place in Munich, as Grafing, located around 30 kilometres (19 mi) kilometres south of the city, is connected to the Munich S-Bahn system.

The stabbing occurred amidst heightened security concerns regarding Islamic terrorism in Europe.

== The attack ==
The attack occurred during the morning hours of 10 May 2016 at Grafing station. A 56-year-old man was attacked by the perpetrator with a 10-centimetre-long (3.9 in) knife on board a Munich S-Bahn train; the victim later died at a hospital. The attacker then assaulted another man on the station platform before targeting two cyclists outside, including a 58 year old local newspaper deliveryman who was seriously injured. According to eyewitnesses and confirmed by investigators, the perpetrator shouted "Allahu Akbar" ("God is great" in Arabic) and, in German, "Infidel, you must die now" during the attack. All victims were randomly chosen. The train driver and a security official were reported to have chased the man away from the station. Police officers responded at the crime scene on 5:04 a.m. and arrested a suspect only minutes later in front of the station.

== Perpetrator ==
The perpetrator was a 27-year-old unemployed carpenter with no known ties to Islamist organizations. In accordance with German privacy law, he was named as "Paul H.". The perpetrator was arrested in the hours following the attack and eventually admitted to a psychiatric hospital. H. had a drug addiction and was previously diagnosed with bipolar affective disorder and schizophrenia. Despite the partially published name and nationality, social media users speculated that H. was not ethnically German and potentially had a migration background. It was later specified that this was not the case and that H. was born in Hesse.

Some international press agencies initially claimed that the attacker was Rafik Yousef, an Ansar al-Islam member convicted of an attempted assassination plot on former Iraqi Prime Minister Ayad Allawi. This was widely reported despite the fact that Rafik was killed by Berlin Police a year prior to the attack in a stabbing incident. Moreover, the further Bavarian Police described the attacker as a 27-year-old German national, whereas Rafik had Iraqi citizenship and was 41 at the time of his death.

== Aftermath ==
=== Investigation ===
On 10 May 2016 a spokesperson at the Bavarian state criminal investigation office stated that she could not confirm that the attack was related to terrorism. Police investigated a potential Islamist motive, but that the perpetrator made contradictory statements, and the same day a spokesperson of the prosecutor's office, said that an "Islamistic background" was no longer suspected.

Later that day, it was reported that the perpetrator had drug and mental problems and was treated two days earlier. The assumption that the attacker was an Islamist was ruled out, but a political motive was still being considered, though the attacker appeared to be confused during the interrogation, was not cooperating during first interrogation, but later admitted to committing the attack. No links to terrorist networks were known. The police established a special commission, consisting of 80 officers. The perpetrator's cell phone and tablet computer were found and evaluated; in addition, CCTV recordings from the train and station were investigated.

=== Security measures ===
Service at the train station was temporarily closed to allow authorities to conduct their investigation.

The attack caused the New York City Police Department to temporarily increase security on the New York City Subway system while investigators looked into possible connections to international militant organizations.

Discussions made in the wake of the attack raised the possibility that bag checks at German train stations might have found the knife used in the attack and prevented it from happening, but German public opinion believes that such searches are an invasion of privacy.

=== Mental illness discussion ===
The attack was cited as one of a number of incidents in which mentally disturbed individuals launched violent attacks under the justification of Islamist ideas or slogans. Other examples include Man Haron Monis, the gunman in the 2014 Sydney hostage crisis; and Michael Zehaf-Bibeau, the perpetrator of the 2014 shootings at Parliament Hill, Ottawa. According to psychologists and psychiatrists who study radicalization, jihad propaganda and calls to kill infidels can push mentally disturbed individuals to act, even in the absence of direct or personal contact with radical Islamists.

=== Other reactions ===
German Minister of the Interior Thomas de Maizière condemned the attack as "cowardly and outrageous" on the day of the assault.

A conspiracy theory, which began in Italy before spreading to Germany and then to the English-speaking world, purported that Paul H. was actually named Rafik Youssef and that his name had been changed as part of a cover-up. Rafik Yousef was an Islamist in Berlin who was shot dead by police in September 2015.

The attack was compared to a knife attack at Hanover main station earlier that year on 26 February. The Italian newspaper La Repubblica compared this attack to the 2016 Wurzburg train attack, as did the BBC.

Journalist Nabila Ramdani expressed outrage at what she termed the "purposeful" and "grossly manipulative" media use of the phrase Allahu Akbar, which, she claims, has become, a "trigger for publicity: the perfect tool for those seeking to spread as much discord as possible".

== Verdict ==
On 17 August 2017, the Landgericht München II deemed the accused not criminally liable for his actions in Grafing. His mental illness, testified to by a psychiatrist in court, was acknowledged not only by the judge, but also by the prosecution as well as the accessory prosecution of several victims. He was then sentenced to stay in a closed psychiatric ward for an undetermined time.

== See also ==
- Islamic terrorism in Europe
- List of mass stabbings in Germany
