= Rafik Yousef =

Iraqi terrorist

- رفيق يوسف
- Born: Rafik Mohamad Yousef; 27 August 1974; Baghdad, Iraq
- Died: 17 September 2015 (aged 41); Berlin, Germany
- Other name: Mohamad Raific Kairadin
- Citizenship: Iraqi
- Organization: Ansar al-Islam
- Known for: Attempt to assassinate Iraqi Prime Minister Ayad Allawi

Rafik Mohamad Yousef (Arabic: رفيق محمد يوسف; 27 August 1974 – 17 September 2015) was an Iraqi terrorist who was tried and convicted for plotting to assassinate the Prime Minister of Iraq during his visit to Germany in 2004. After eight years imprisonment, he was released and on 17 September 2015, Yousef was shot and killed when he attacked a Berlin Police officer with a knife.

== Early life and education ==
Rafik Yousef was born in Baghdad to a family of Sunni Kurds in 1974. He was imprisoned in Iraq for over two years under Saddam Hussein's rule.

== Career ==
After his release from prison, Yousef immigrated to Germany in 1996, at the age of 22, living in Mannheim and later in Berlin-Gropiusstadt, where he started a construction business. He had a German travel document. People who knew him described him as an "insane and harried" person for his short, violent temper; he was also threatened to be banned from a Berlin mosque because of his radical statements.

=== 2004 assassination attempt ===
In 2004, Yousef and two other Kurds, Ata Rashid and Mazen Hussein, both of them members of Ansar al-Islam, a radical Islamist group linked to al-Qaeda, planned to assassinate Ayad Allawi, while he visited Germany to meet chancellor Gerhard Schröder. The assassination was planned to take place during an appearance by Allawi in Berlin at Deutsche Bank on 3 December 2004. German authorities had been monitoring Rashid since early 2003, after being tipped off by Italian intelligence agencies. Yousef was linked to recruitment for the group, having financed their operations in Iraq with €45,000.

The three were arrested on 2 December 2004, as part of a larger law enforcement effort within the European Union which arrested more than 20 alleged affiliates of Ansar al-Islam, as security officials asserted that the group was smuggling trained operatives into Europe to carry out attacks. Rafik Yousef personally knew Ansar al-Islam founder Mullah Krekar and had close ties with him.

Yousef, Rashid, and Hussein were all charged terrorism, with Yousef's trial beginning in Stuttgart's high court on 20 June 2006. Yousef was implicated by e-mails and tapped phone calls that used coded messages to plan the assassination plans, as well as testimony by an informer for the Federal Office for the Protection of the Constitution, who stated that Yousef tried to convince him to fight in Iraq as a militant and wanted the informer to carry out an attack at a carnival celebration in Berlin the next year. Yousef accused the court of conspiring against him with the Federal Criminal Police Office, and was indignant in court, refusing to stand up when commanded by the female judge, which among other misbehaviour such, as insulting court staff and witnesses as well as entering inadmissible evidence during proceedings, led to 22 charges of contempt of court resulting in an additional 114 days to his sentence. He was sentenced on 15 July 2008, after a trial that cost €1,200,000.

Yousef served an eight-year sentence, during which he was noted for his violent behaviour, such as attacking a female prison guard, breaking one of her ribs. He was freed in 2013, but not deported, as Yousef faced persecution as a Kurd in Iraq and risked being put to death. He was required to wear an electronic ankle monitor. At the time of his death in 2015, Yousef was under investigation in four counts of threatening government employees, including a judge, a social worker and a police officer.

=== 2015 police officer attack and death ===
At 8:52 in the morning, Yousef forcibly removed his ankle monitor, with attending officers finding that Yousef had left his apartment. An attempted knife attack on a female passerby was attributed to Yousef at around 9:00. At 9:48, police were alerted to a "madman with a knife" who was threatening passersby in Spandau borough. Shortly before 10:00, four squad cars arrived at the scene and as the first police officer emerged from her vehicle, Yousef stabbed her in the neck just above her protective vest. Her partner immediately drew his gun and shot Yousef four times, killing him. Ricochets of the gunfire also injured the downed officer.

== Posthumous conspiracy theory ==
Following a fatal knife attack at Grafing station in Bavaria on 10 May, 2016, a conspiracy theory claiming that Yousef is still alive and active began in Italy before spreading to Germany and then to the English-speaking world. It initially purported that Yousef was "Paul H.", the name given to the then-unidentified suspect, although later "Paul H." was captured and admitted into a mental hospital. In 2016, conspiracy theorists claimed that Yousef's name had been changed as part of a cover-up and that the suspect had Islamist motives, incorrectly reporting that he yelled "Allahu Akbar".
