= Ostermünchen station =

Railway station in Tuntenhausen, Germany

Ostermünchen
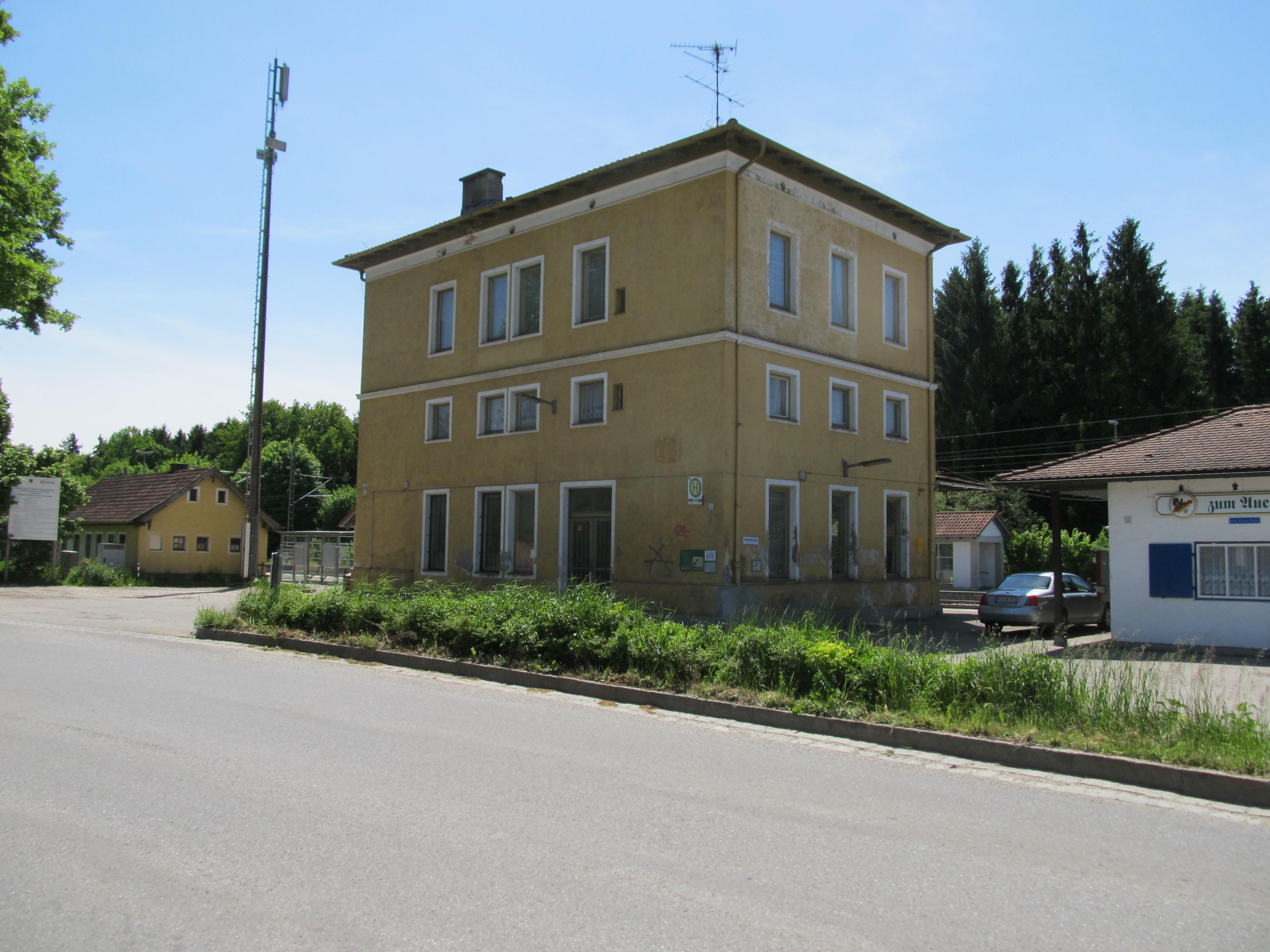
- 2012

General information
- Location: Bahnhofstraße/Rosenheimer Straße; 83104 Tuntenhausen; Bavaria; Germany
- Coordinates: 47.9420°N 12.0419°E
- Elevation: 503 m (1,650 ft)
- System: Bf
- Owner: DB Netz
- Operator: DB Station&Service
- Lines: Munich–Rosenheim railway (KBS 950)
- Platforms: 2 side platforms
- Tracks: 3
- Train operators: Bayerische Regiobahn

Construction
- Parking: yes
- Cycle facilities: yes
- Accessible: partly

Other information
- Station code: 4796
- DS100 code: MOM
- IBNR: 8004703
- Category: 6
- Website: www.bahnhof.de

History
- Opened: 15 October 1871; 154 years ago

Services
Preceding station		Following station
Aßling (Oberbay) towards München Hbf	RB 54	Großkarolinenfeld towards Kufstein
Location
- Location within Bavaria Location within Germany Location within Europe

Ostermünchen station is a railway station in the village of Ostermünchen, in the municipality of Tuntenhausen, located in the Rosenheim district of Bavaria, Germany.
