= Großkarolinenfeld station =

Railway station in Großkarolinenfeld, Germany

Großkarolinenfeld
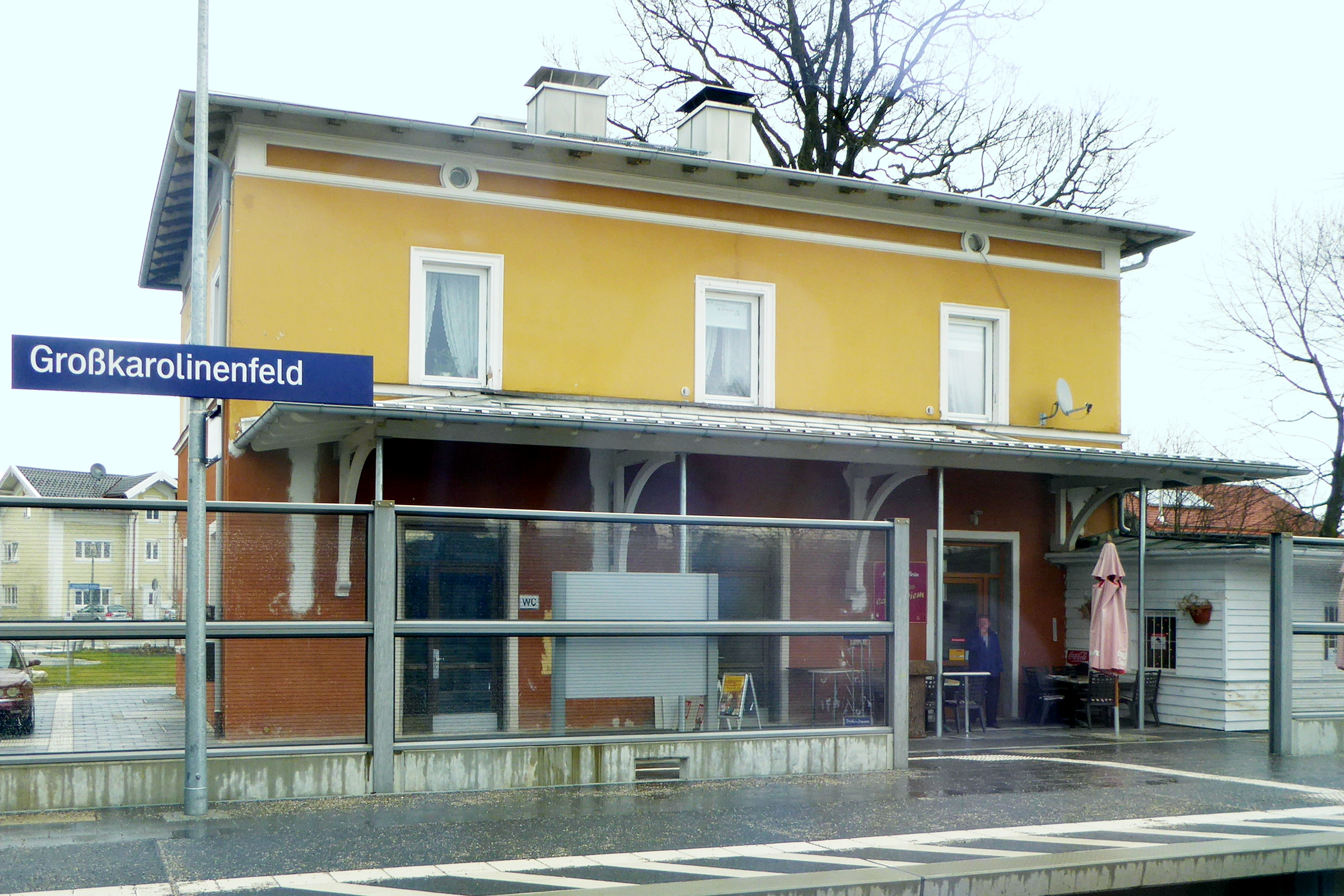
- 2016

General information
- Location: Bahnhofstraße 24; 83109 Großkarolinenfeld; Bavaria; Germany
- Coordinates: 47.8889°N 12.0850°E
- System: Hp
- Owner: DB Netz
- Operator: DB Station&Service
- Lines: Munich–Rosenheim railway (KBS 950)
- Platforms: 2 side platforms
- Tracks: 2
- Train operators: Bayerische Regiobahn

Construction
- Parking: yes
- Cycle facilities: yes
- Accessible: partly

Other information
- Station code: 2350
- DS100 code: MGK
- IBNR: 8002424
- Category: 6
- Website: www.bahnhof.de

History
- Opened: 15 October 1871; 154 years ago

Services
Preceding station		Following station
Ostermünchen towards München Hbf	RB 54	Rosenheim towards Kufstein
Ostermünchen towards München Hbf	RE 5	Rosenheim towards Salzburg Hbf
Location
- Location within Bavaria Location within Germany Location within Europe

Großkarolinenfeld station is a railway station in the municipality of Großkarolinenfeld, located in the Rosenheim district of Bavaria, Germany. It has two tracks, which are located next to two side platforms, which are connected by an underpass.
