= Gregor Ebner =

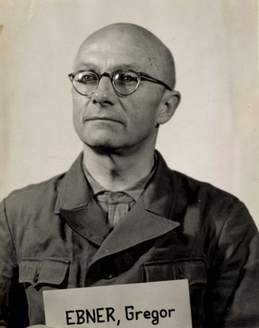
- Ebner in U.S. custody
- Born: 24 June 1892; Ichenhausen, Kingdom of Bavaria, German Empire
- Died: 22 March 1974 (aged 81); Wolfratshausen, Bad Tölz-Wolfratshausen, Bavaria, West Germany
- Political party: Nazi Party
- Status: Deceased
- Motive: Nazism
- Conviction: Membership in a criminal organization
- Trial: RuSHA trial
- Penalty: Time served
- SS career
- Allegiance: Germany
- Branch: Schutzstaffel

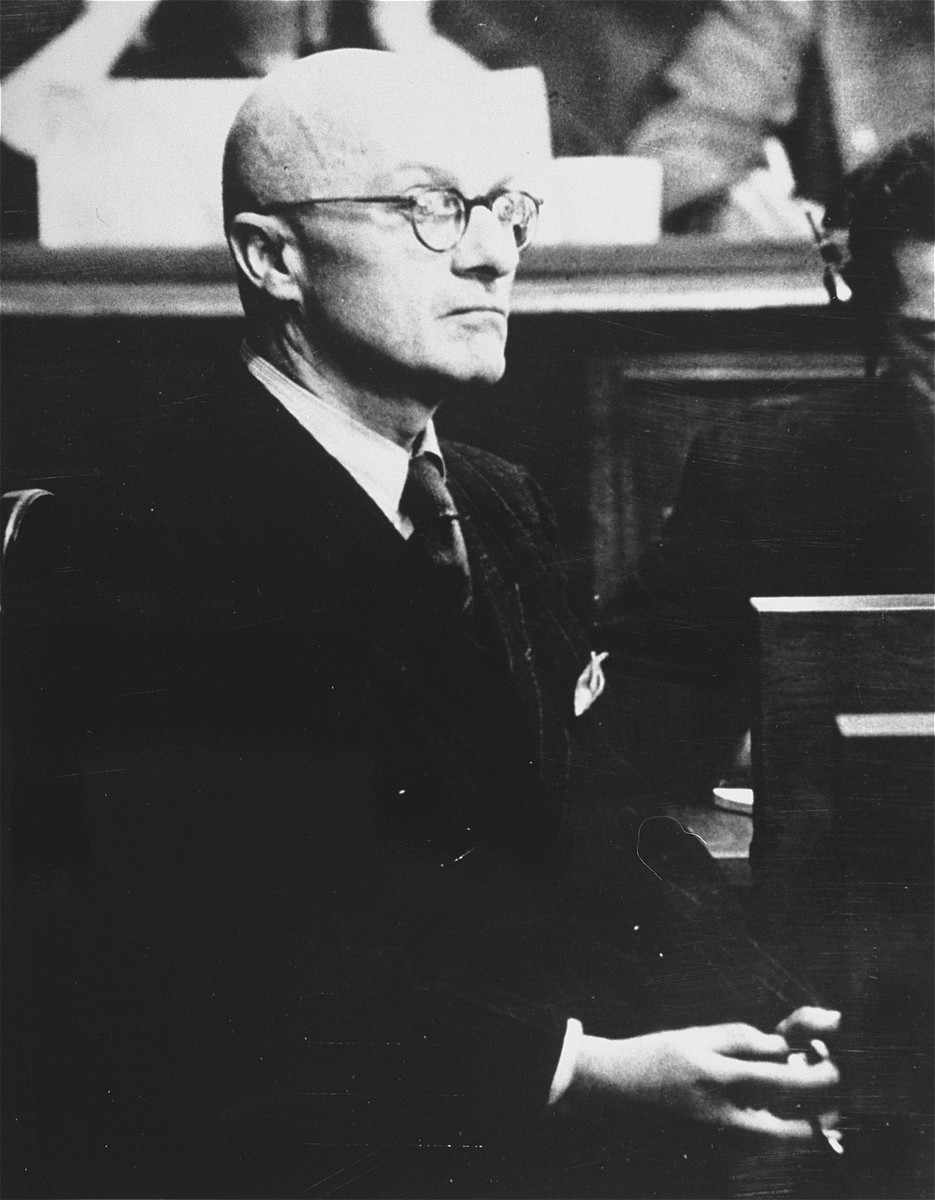
Gregor Ebner during the Nuremberg Trials

Gregor Ebner (24 June 1892 – 22 March 1974) was a medical doctor from Kirchseeon near Munich. During the time of Nazi Germany he served as the medical leader of all the Lebensborn Homes.

== Life ==
Ebner was born in Ichenhausen to Gregor Ebner, a coffee-house proprietor and his wife Marie (née Maurer). From 1914 to 1918, he took part in World War I as an army field doctor. Thereafter he spent several months with the Freikorps Epp. Following his graduation from medical school in June 1920 he opened a medical practice in Kirchseeon. In 1930 he became a member of the National Socialist German Workers' Party (NSDAP), commonly referred to in English as the Nazi Party (Membership number 340.925). He immediately became the Town Group Leader and Deputy Regional Leader. In 1931 he joined the General SS. Ebner met Heinrich Himmler in 1930 and was his house doctor for many years.

In mid-1937, Ebner gave up his private practice and joined the Lebensborn Association full time. He remained in the function of medical head of all the Lebensborn run homes. In addition, he was the Chairman of the Disciplinary Court of the National Socialist Doctor's League from 1938. In 1939, he gained the rank of SS-Oberführer.

On the 10 March 1948, Ebner was only found guilty of being a member of the SS at the Nuremberg SS Race and Settlement Main Office hearing and sentenced to time served. Thereafter, he continued his medical practice in Kirchseeon and Wolfratshausen.

== Bibliography ==
- Lilienthal, Georg (2003). Der "Lebensborn e.V." Ein Instrument nationalsozialistischer Rassenpolitik. Frankfurt am Main: Fischer Taschenbuch Verlag. ISBN 3-596-15711-0.
- Klee, Ernst (2007). Das Personenlexikon zum Dritten Reich (Revised 2nd ed.). Frankfurt am Main: Fischer. ISBN 978-3-596-16048-8.
- Koop, Volker (2007). Der Führer ein Kind schenken: Die SS-Organisation Lebensborn e.V. Cologne: Böhlau Verlag. ISBN 978-3-412-21606-1.
