= Aßling (Oberbay) station =

Railway station in Aßling, Germany

Aßling (Oberbay)
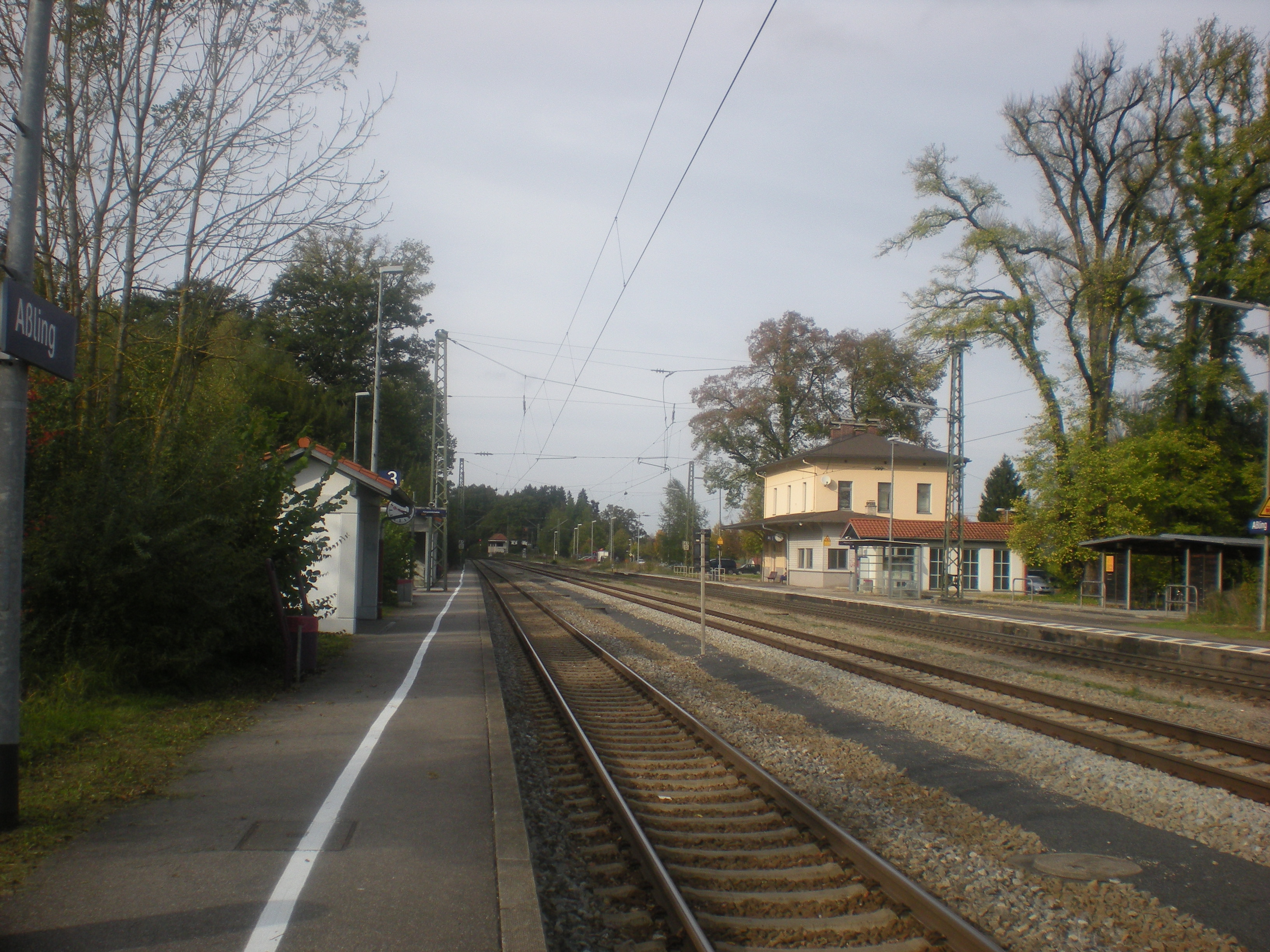
- 2012

General information
- Location: Am Bahnhof 2; 85617 Aßling; Bavaria; Germany
- Coordinates: 47.98979415019819°N 11.993697095164928°E
- Elevation: 509 m (1,670 ft)
- System: Bf
- Owner: Deutsche Bahn
- Operator: DB Netz; DB Station&Service
- Lines: Munich–Rosenheim railway (KBS 950)
- Platforms: 2 side platforms
- Tracks: 3
- Train operators: Bayerische Regiobahn
- Connections: 444 447

Construction
- Parking: yes
- Cycle facilities: yes
- Accessible: partly

Other information
- Station code: 200
- DS100 code: MAG
- IBNR: 8000634
- Category: 5
- Fare zone: : 4
- Website: www.bahnhof.de

History
- Opened: 15 October 1871; 154 years ago

Services
Preceding station		Following station
Grafing Bahnhof towards München Hbf	RB 54	Ostermünchen towards Kufstein
Location
- Location within Bavaria Location within Germany Location within Europe

Aßling (Oberbay) station is a railway station in the municipality of Aßling, located in the Ebersberg district of Bavaria, Germany.
