= Grafing Bahnhof =

Munich S-Bahn station

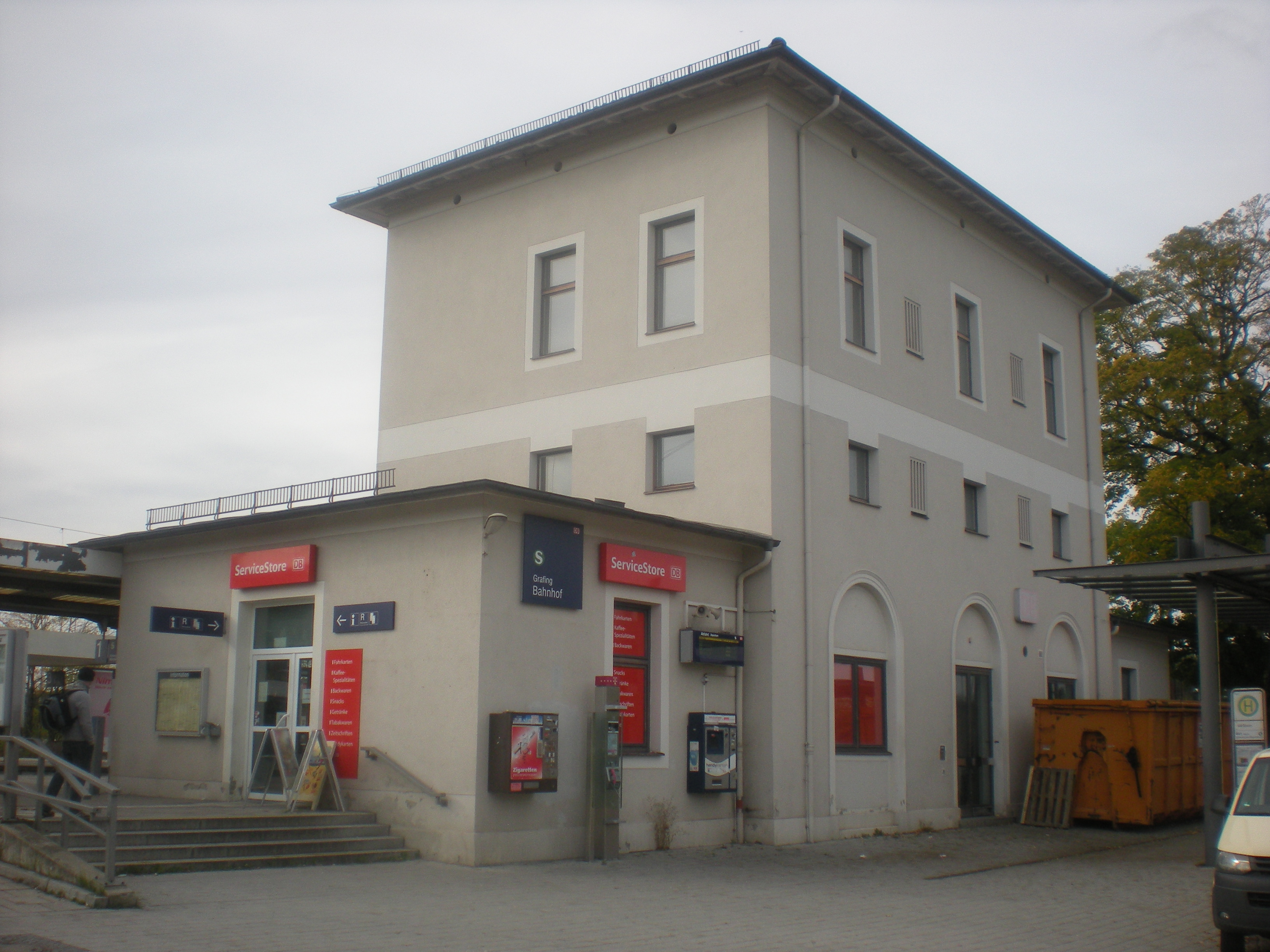
- Street side of the station building

General information
- Location: Hauptstr. 31, Grafing Bahnhof, Grafing, Bavaria; Germany
- Coordinates: 48°2′36″N 11°56′24″E
- Owner: Deutsche Bahn
- Operator: DB Station&Service
- Lines: Munich–Rosenheim (KBS 950 / 951 / 999.4); Grafing–Wasserburg (KBS 948 / 999.4); Grafing–Glonn (closed)
- Platforms: 6
- Connections: 345, 437, 440, 442, 444, 447, 448, 4800

Other information
- Station code: 2240
- DS100 code: MGB
- IBNR: 8002347
- Category: 3
- Fare zone: : 3 and 4
- Website: stationsdatenbank.de; www.bahnhof.de

History
- Opened: 15 October 1871; 154 years ago
- Electrified: 12 April 1927; 99 years ago

Services
Preceding station		Following station
Munich East towards München Hbf	RB 48	Grafing Stadt towards Wasserburg (Inn)
Preceding station		Following station
Munich East towards München Hbf	RE 5 Limited service	Aßling (Oberbay) towards Salzburg Hbf
Munich East towards München Hbf	RB 54	Aßling (Oberbay) towards Kufstein
Preceding station	Munich S-Bahn	Following station
Kirchseeon towards Geltendorf	S4 Limited service	Grafing Stadt towards Ebersberg
Kirchseeon towards Tutzing	S6	Grafing Stadt towards Ebersberg
Location
- Location within Bavaria Location within Germany Location within Europe

Grafing station (German: Grafing Bahnhof, rather than Bahnhof Grafing, because it serves the town but is not located in it) is a station in the Bavarian town of Grafing and a station of the Munich S-Bahn. There is also the S-Bahn station of Grafing Stadt ("Grafing town") in central Grafing. The station has six platform tracks and is classified by Deutsche Bahn as a category 3 station. It is served daily by about 160 trains, 110 of which are S-Bahn trains. Grafing station is on the Munich–Rosenheim railway and is the beginning of the Grafing–Wasserburg railway to Wasserburg.

== Location ==
The station is in the west of the village of Grafing Bahnhof ("Grafing station"), which is to the west of the town of Grafing. The station building is on the Hauptstraße (main street); in front of the station the streets of Birkenstraße and Brünnsteinstraße branch off the Hauptstraße. To the south, state road 2351 passes under the railway tracks. There is a bus station in front of the station.

== History ==
Grafing station was opened along with the Munich–Rosenheim railway on 15 October 1871. The new line replaced the Bavarian Maximilian's Railway between Munich and Rosenheim and made the detour via Holzkirchen and the Mangfall valley unnecessary. A branch line from Grafing to Glonn was opened on 26 May 1894. This was followed by the opening of another branch line to Ebersberg on 6 November 1899, which was extended to Wasserburg on 1 October 1903. Passenger services on the Grafing–Glonn line were closed on 31 May 1970 due to declining passenger numbers and freight operations on the line ended on 23 May 1971. The station was integrated in the Munich S-Bahn network on 28 May 1972, the S-Bahn trains run over the Munich–Rosenheim line to Grafing station and then run over the Grafing–Wasserburg line to Ebersberg. The station was upgraded for S-Bahn operations in 1972. Since 1999, services between Munich East station and Grafing run on the S-Bahn's own tracks, which run parallel to the main line.

== Infrastructure ==
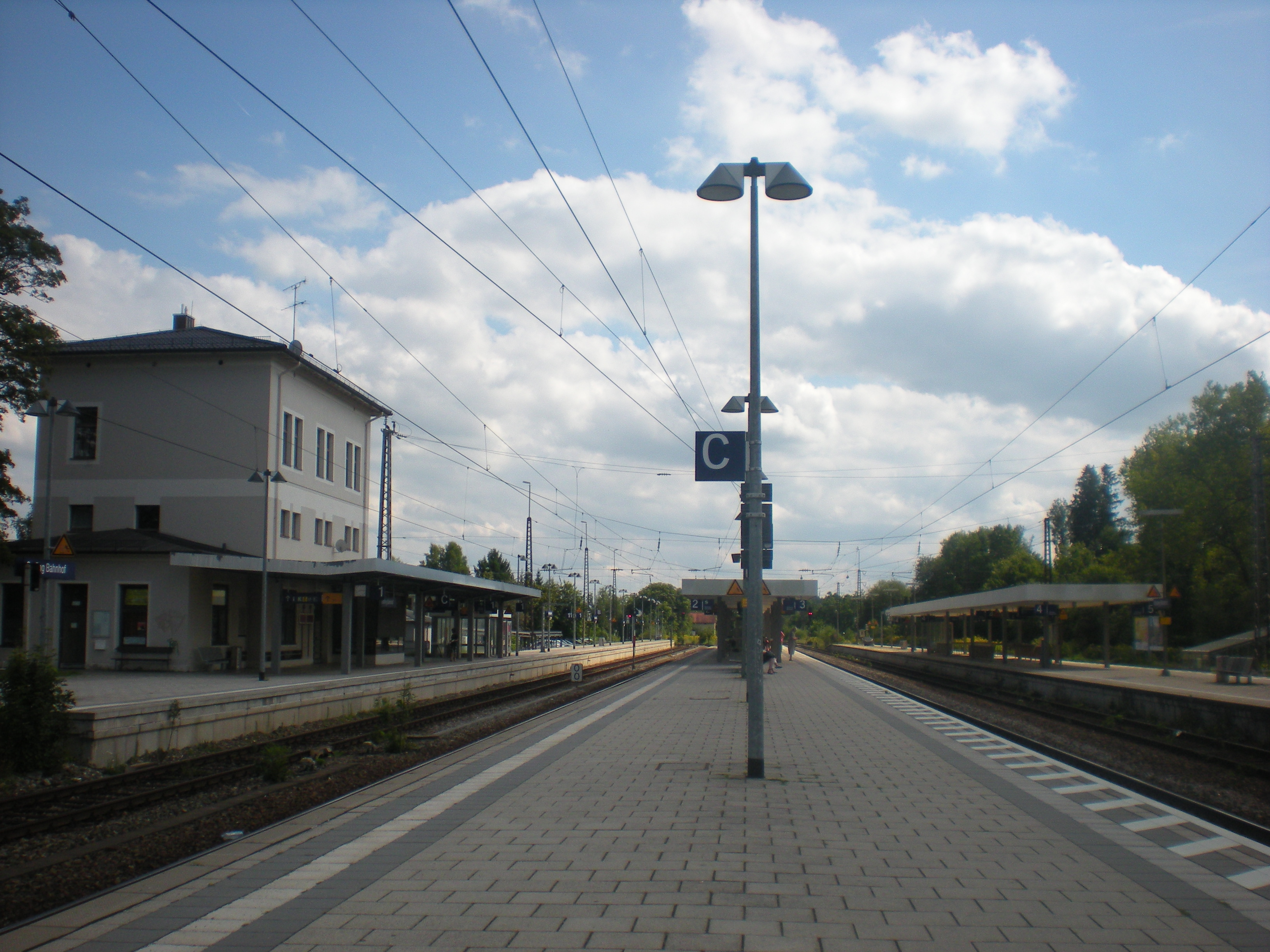
Grafing station platforms

Grafing station has six tracks on three platforms. Platform track 1 is located next to the station building and is served by the S-Bahn to Munich. The S-Bahn to Ebersberg and trains to Wasserburg stop on track 2. Regional trains on the Munich–Rosenheim line towards Munich stop on track 3. Trains towards Rosenheim stop on track 5. Track 4 and the bay platform 11 (which is attached to platform 1) are no longer used in scheduled operations. All platforms are covered, and have digital destination displays. The platforms are connected by a tunnel to platform 1. Platform 1 and the first island platform are equipped with lifts, and have barrier-free access for the disabled; the second island platform (tracks 4 and 5) do not have barrier-free access. The entrance building has a travel centre, which is accessible from the side of platform 1. The main hall of the station building is no longer open to the public.

Platform lengths and heights are as follows:

- Track 11: Length 146 m, height 76 cm
- Track 1: length 221 m, height 96 cm
- Track 2: length 334 m, height 96 cm
- Track 3: length 334 m, height 76 cm
- Track 4: length 360 m, height 76 cm
- Track 5: length 360 m, height 76 cm

== Rail services ==
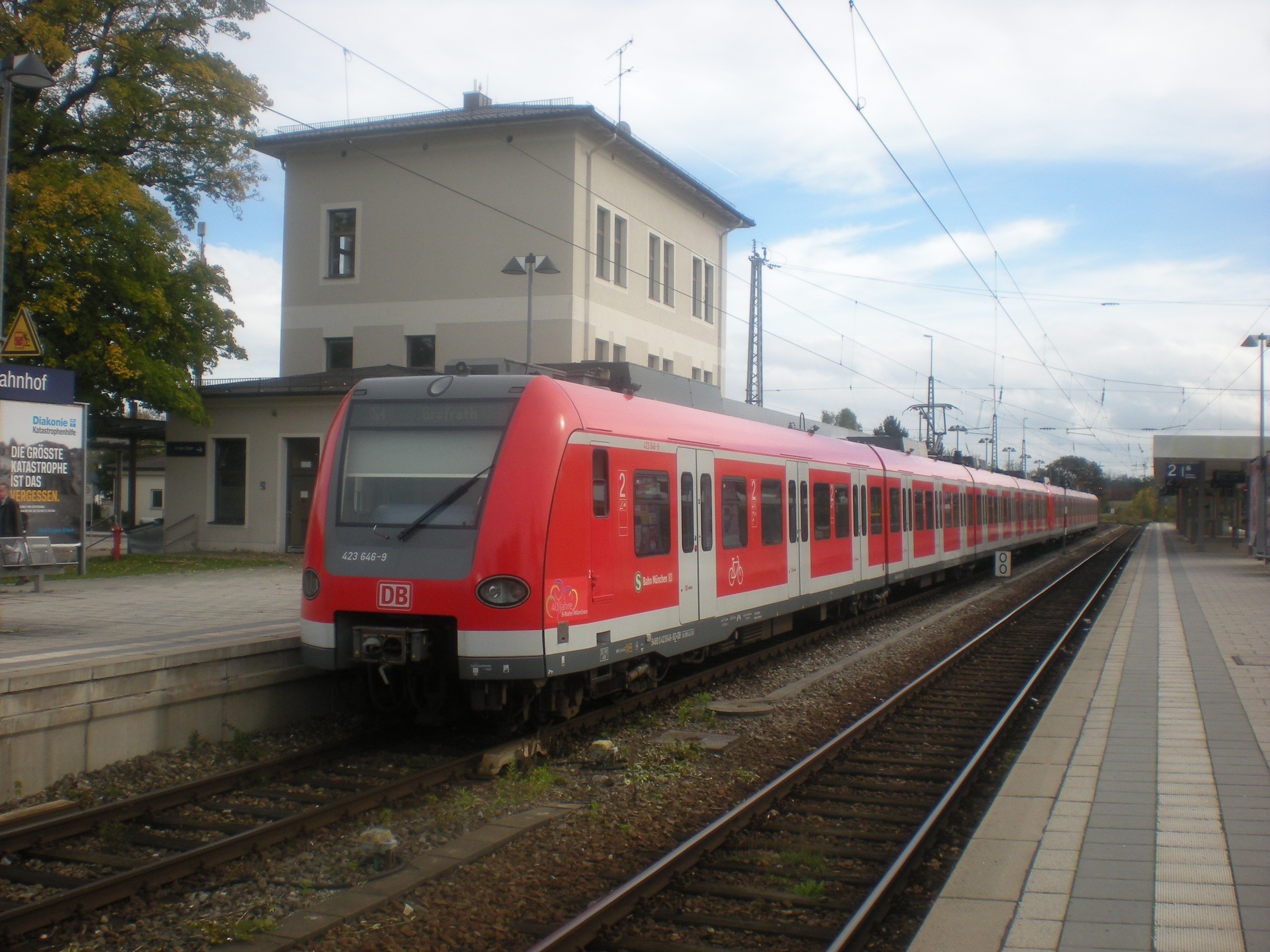
S4 service to Grafrath

Grafing station is served every hour by a Regional-Express service (RE5) between Munich and Salzburg operated by the Bayerische Oberlandbahn with Flirt 3 EMUs. It also operates an hourly Regionalbahn services (RB54) between Munich, Rosenheim and Kufstein. Regionalbahn services (RB48) operated by SüdostBayernBahn with class 628 run hourly between Grafing and Wasserburg. In addition, Munich S-Bahn S4 and S6 service are operated with class 423 EMUs at 20-minute intervals in the peak. At other times during the day only the S6 service runs, with two services an hour (20/40). All InterCity trains pass through the station without stopping.

Line	Route	Frequency	Operator
RE 5	Munich – Grafing station – Rosenheim – Traunstein – Freilassing – Salzburg	Some trains	Bayerische Oberlandbahn
RB 54	Munich – Grafing – Rosenheim (– Kufstein)	Hourly	Bayerische Oberlandbahn
RB 48	Grafing – Ebersberg – Wasserburg (Inn)	Hourly	Südostbayernbahn
