= Grafing–Wasserburg railway =

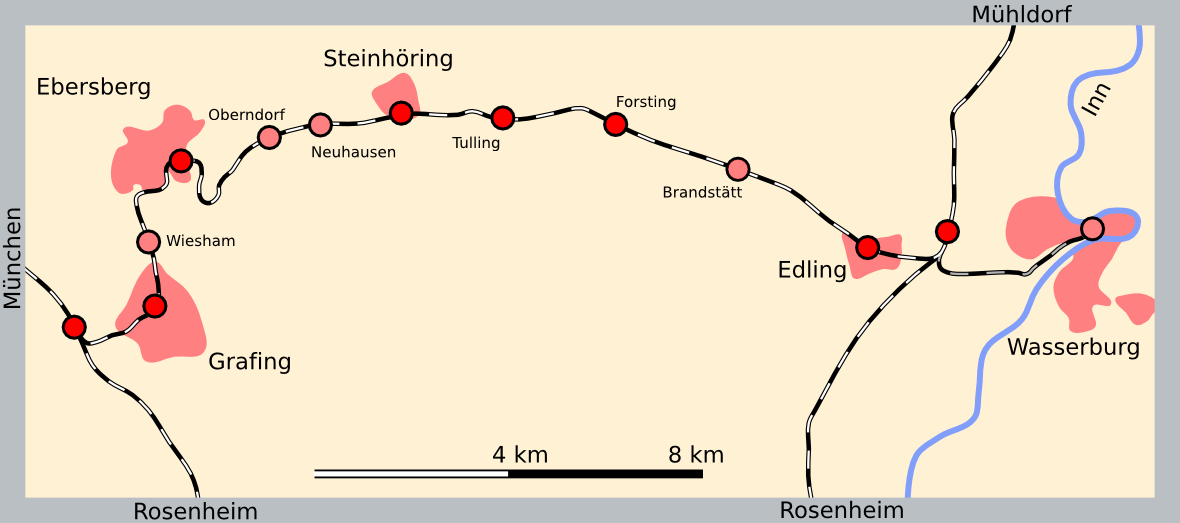

Overview
- Line number: 5710 Grafing–Wasserburg Bahnhof; 5711 Wasserburg Bf–Wasserburg Stadt
- Locale: Bavaria, Germany

Service
- Route number: 948

Technical
- Line length: 29.1 km (18.1 mi)
- Track gauge: 1,435 mm (4 ft 8 1/2 in) standard gauge
- Electrification: 15 kV/16.7 Hz AC overhead catenary (Grafing–Ebersberg)

The Grafing–Wasserburg railway is a 29.1 km long, wholly single-track branch line in Upper Bavaria. It was partly built between 1899 and 1905. It is also called the Filzenexpress, which refers to the former raised bog (known in Bavarian as Filz)) it crosses in the Ebrach valley.

A six-kilometer section at the western end from Grafing station to the town of Ebersberg is electrified as part of line S 4 of the Munich S-Bahn. It is also, along with the rest of the line to Wasserburg (Inn) Bahnhof (the name of the village where the station—Bahnhof in German—is located, which is outside the town of Wasserburg), served by regional services of the SüdostBayernBahn. The 4.4 km long link from Wasserburg (Inn) Bahnhof to Wasserburg (Inn) Stadt (town) has been out of service since 2 March 1987.

The rail infrastructure of the Grafing–Ebersberg section is owned and maintained by DB Netz. The following section to Wasserburg is owned by SüdostBayernBahn. The town of Wasserburg owns the infrastructure from Wasserburg station to Wasserburg town.

== Route ==
The route of the Filzenexpress branches to the east at the southern end of Grafing station from the Munich–Rosenheim railway. Trains to and from Ebersberg (–Wasserburg) at Grafing station can use tracks 1 and 2, which are both reversible, and track 11, a bay platform; all three have platforms. There are crossovers to the west of the station giving access to the main line tracks to Munich.

After about two kilometres the line reaches the centre of the town of Grafing at Grafing Stadt station. It then runs through some tight curves to the north through the hamlet of Wiesham, which once had a station, uphill to Ebersberg. Ebersberg station is located on a hill orientated in a west–east direction and it has two platforms, one of which is only accessible from the Grafing direction and is served only by the S-Bahn. The overhead line ends east of the station. The line has been laid over the next two kilometres in a large loop to the south to provide a reasonable slope to cope with the difference in height between Ebersberg station and the Ebrach river. Once the line has reached the bottom of the valley it runs to the east through Oberndorf bei Ebersberg and the hamlet of Neuhausen bei Ebersberg, both of which once had stations, before it reaches Steinhöring station.

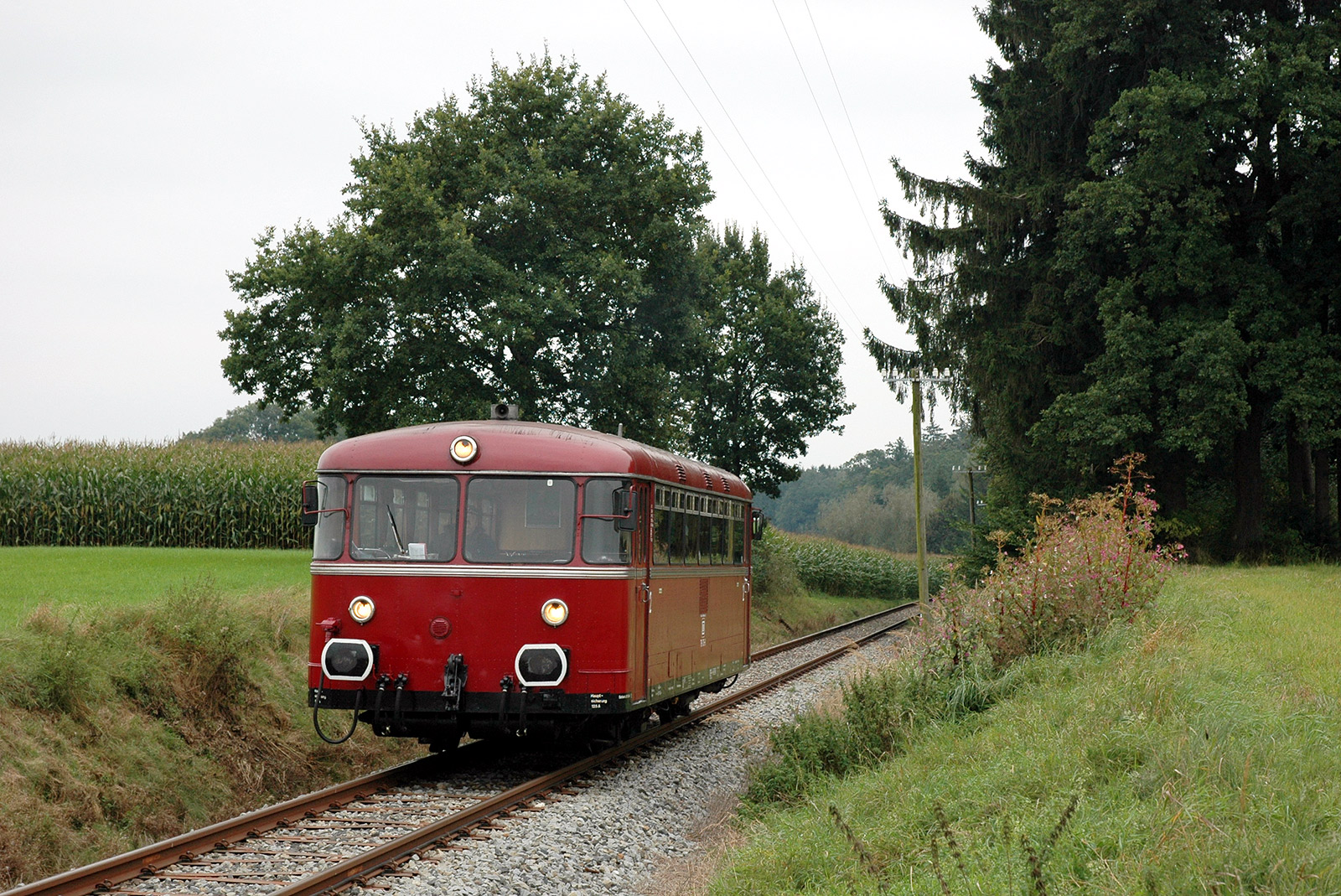
Railbus between Brandstätt and Edling

The line continues largely parallel to federal highway B 304 through Tulling, which has loading tracks for freight, to Forsting station, which has a freight siding. Still running in an easterly direction, the line runs through Brandstätt, Brandstätt station and Edling, before it reaches the Wasserburg district of Reitmehring. It then curves to the north to the station of Wasserburg Bahnhof and the Rosenheim–Mühldorf railway. The station area still has three of the five tracks it once had. The abandoned line to Wasserburg town runs to the south from the station and then east through the grounds of the Meggle AG (which makes dairy products) down to the Inn and passes through a short tunnel to reach Wasserburg Stadt station. The tunnel, the town station and the tracks were covered during the closing of this section of the line with gravel and the sidings were demolished.

== History ==
The districts of Ebersberg and Wasserburg were first connected with railways with the opening of the Munich–Grafing–Rosenheim line in 1871 and the Rosenheim–Wasserburg Bahnhof–Mühldorf line in 1876. However, neither the market town of Ebersberg nor the town of Wasserburg had direct rail connections. Due to the hilly topography Wasserburg station was built about four kilometres west of the town in the village of Reitmehring. Furthermore, the district and town of Wasserburg had no direct rail link with Munich. By the early 1880s, therefore, several initiatives had emerged to build a branch line from Wasserburg via Ebersberg towards the west, but these efforts were not successful at first.

In 1890, the government of the Kingdom of Bavaria under Prince Luitpold granted a planning concession for a line between Wasserburg station and the Rosenheim–Mühldorf line to the town of Wasserburg, which is located in a loop of the Inn.

A year later, the route of a local railway between the Munich–Rosenheim line and Ebersberg was approved. Kirchseeon was initially proposed for the location of the junction from the existing line until, in the context of the simultaneous planning for the Grafing–Glonn railway, it was decided to build the junction at Grafing station. In the initial planning, the line would have run from there via Hörmannsdorf to Ebersberg, but it decided to use a route via Wiesham and the centre of Grafing instead. Ebersberg submitted two petitions in 1891 calling for the acceleration of its construction, which highlighted the expected economic impact of the line for the transport of timber from the Ebersberg Forest and demanded the construction by the state as compensation for damage to the forest by a plague of Black Arches caterpillars.

The middle section between Ebersberg and Wasserburg was approved for inclusion in the plans on 13 January 1892.

=== Construction and opening ===
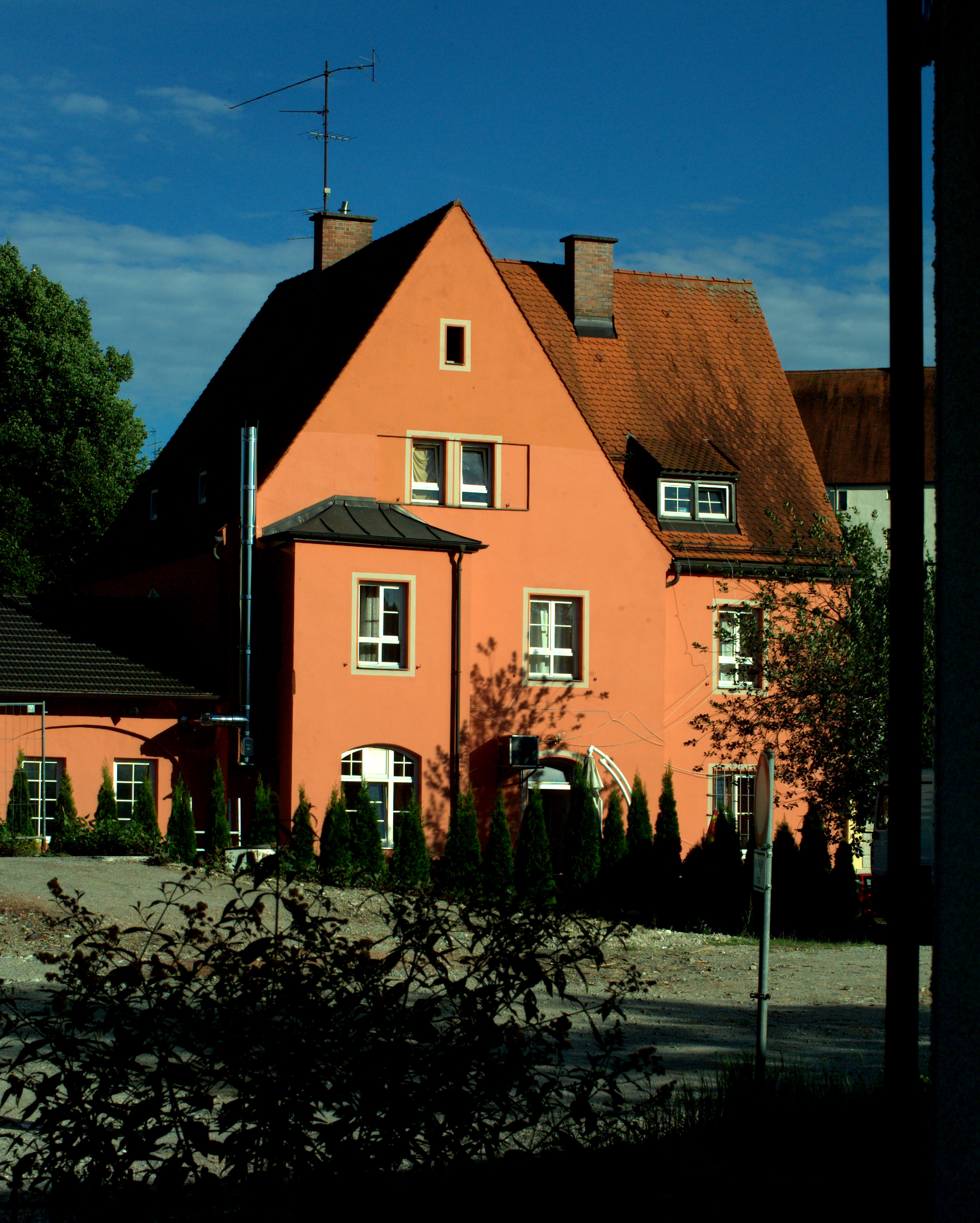
Wasserburg Stadt station building

The Bavarian state parliament approved the construction of the section from Grafing station to Ebersberg by the Royal Bavarian State Railways (Königlich Bayerische Staats-Eisenbahnen, K.Bay. Sts.B) on 13 March 1896 and the associated law came into force on 17 June 1896. It considered a request from Ebersberg to build the Ebersberg station on the proposed route extension to Wasserburg on a range of hills away from the town centre. The estimated construction cost for the first section totalled 393,300 marks. In October 1898 construction began, with an average of 80 to 100 workers employed at the same time. The construction contractor was Johann and Franz Xaver Hallinger of Rosenheim. The opening of the Grafing–Ebersberg section took place on 6 November 1899 and scheduled services began operating on 12 November. On 27 January 1900, there was a derailment between Wiesham and Ebersberg, after the embankment of the new line had subsided.

The construction of the section between Wasserburg Station at Reitmehring and the town was approved on 6 March 1900. The land acquisition proved lengthy and more expensive than originally planned, so that the link was not completed until the end of 1902. On 20 December 1902 there were technical trials and opening ceremonies and scheduled services commenced on 24 December 1902.

The Wasserburg station–Ebersberg section was authorised for construction on 16 March 1903. Construction began after completion of land acquisition in October of the same year. Difficulties were experienced in the construction of the crossing of the Laufing bog (Laufinger Moos) near Ebersberg, where the embankment subsided several times. The planned opening date of 1 May 1903 could not be met. Commissioning took place without any major celebrations with trial runs on 27 September and scheduled services commencing on 1 October 1903.

A proposal promoted by the Schnaitsee railway committee and supported by the town of Wasserburg to have the line extended east of Wasserburg via Schnaitsee to Trostberg was not implemented. The Bavarian Ministry of Transport rejected the proposal in August 1913 after a feasibility study.

=== Operations until the 1980s ===
The first timetable, valid from October 1905, had three pairs of passenger services over the entire journey. This offer was increased up the First World War by two more pairs of services. From the start, were also additional services between Wasserburg station and Wasserburg town to establish provide connections to and from the trains on the Rosenheim–Mühldorf railway.

On 24 April 1920 the line, along with the K.Bay. Sts.B, was assumed by the Bavarian Group Administration of Deutsche Reichsbahn, which was finally fully integrated into the Reichsbahn on 1 October 1933. On 7 September 1949, the Grafing–Wasserburg railway became part of the network of the Deutsche Bundesbahn (DB).

The traction for the trains was first supplied by steam locomotives of class D VI and VII D, but under the direction of the Deutsche Reichsbahn they were gradually replaced by machines of class 70.0, 86 and 98.8. In its early years, DB used locomotives of class 64 and 98.3 (Glaskasten, "glass box") at times on the line. Railbuses were used on the line from 1954 and in 1962 they replaced steam locomotives for passenger traffic completely. In the following 32 years, the railbuses were used as needed in combinations of up to five vehicles, although some passenger trains were formed for a couple of years from passenger carriages and class V 100 (later class 211/212) diesel locomotives. After the replacement of steam locomotives, freight trains were also hauled by class V 60 shunting locomotives.

In the 1960s, it was decided to section from Grafing station to central Ebersberg, which had substantial traffic, would be included in the future network of the Munich S-Bahn. In 1969, electrification was carried out on this section. S-Bahn operations began on 28 May 1972; simultaneously the Grafing–Ebersberg section was included in the fare zone of the Münchner Verkehrs- und Tarifverbund (Munich Transport and Tariff Association, MVV). Ebersberg became the eastern terminus of line S 4, which originally ran at 40 minute intervals. The trains to and from Wasserburg now operated mainly from Ebersberg instead of from Grafing station.

=== Operating restrictions in the 1980s and 1990s ===
Until the early 1980s, about eight return passenger services had run each day between Ebersberg and Wasserburg for many years, supplemented by additional pairs of trains between Wasserburg station and Wasserburg town. With the start of the summer 1983 timetable, a bus route was established parallel to the railway, which offered more services and, unlike the railway between Ebersberg and Tulling, could also be used with the lower MVV fares. Services in the railway timetable, however, were gradually reduced.

On 2 March 1987, the embankment between Wasserburg town and Wasserburg station subsided after heavy rain. South of the district of Burgau, about 1 km from Wasserburg town, the track over a clogged culvert was undermined for a distance of several metres, so operations had to be suspended on this section. The damaged section was not fixed, but instead DB transported “trapped" rail vehicles from Wasserburg town by road.

Two weeks later the DB started a closure process for the line. It sought to abandon the passenger service between Ebersberg and Wasserburg town as well as the infrastructure of the Ebersberg–Forsting and the Wasserburg station–Wasserburg town sections. The application for decommissioning was approved by the DB Management Board on 19 December 1988.

In response to the gradual reduction in services, the regional passenger initiative Rettet den Filzenexpress ("Save the Filzenexpress") was founded in 1987. Together with the Pro Bahn association, it advocated the preservation of the railway line and organised regular trips from the Munich region to Wasserburg using scheduled trains on the Ebersberg–Wasserburg line. The local authority declined to close the line, so the council of the district of Rosenheim, in which the Forsting–Wasserburg section is located, agreed on 28 June 1989 that closure would undermine the role of regional rail.

Nevertheless, scheduled services between Ebersberg and Wasserburg was thinned until the early 1990s. During the first half of the decade, only a pair of services ran on the track each day from Monday to Friday, although on weekends the timetable was a bit more extensive. Freight traffic was also closed at the beginning of the decade.

The Federal Ministry of Transport rejected DB's application for decommissioning on 23 February 1994. This was justified, inter alia, by the interest of third parties in taking over the line and its operations. TAG Tegernsee Immobilien und Beteiligung had offered several times since 1989, under certain conditions—including investment in the track and rolling stock amounting to about 40 million marks—to take over responsibility for the line.

=== Renaissance of the line in 1994 ===
The elderly class 798 railbuses were replaced by new class 628 diesel multiple units, first in 1994 on weekday services and on weekends from the timetable change in June 1995.

A year later, on 2 June 1996, services between Ebersberg and Wasserburg were improved under the Bavarian clock-face timetable ("Bayern-Takt"). The Bayerische Eisenbahngesellschaft (Bavarian Railway Company), as the authority for funding regional rail passenger services in Bavaria as of 1 January 1994, ordered changes to the timetable operated by Deutsche Bundesbahn’s subsidiary DB Regio AG, which envisaged nine pairs of trains on weekdays. Since these usually ran via Ebersberg to Grafing station, they could connect not only with S-Bahn services, but also with fast regional services, significantly shortening travel time from Wasserburg to Munich. A further upgrade of services was made on 10 June 2001. Since then, there are direct services between Wasserburg station and Munich in the morning and evening peak hours. Also the Ebersberg–Tulling section of the line was added to the fare zone of the Munich Transport and Tariff Association (as occurred with the parallel bus line in the 1980s).

Since 1 June 2001, the infrastructure of the Grafing–Wasserburg railway and its operations have been assigned to the DB subsidiary SüdostBayernBahn.

The infrastructure of the route was renewed in the autumn 2004 over a length of 13 km for around €4.5 million. Instead of the existing steel and wooden sleepers Y shaped sleepers were installed. Numerous unprotected crossings however still limit maximum speeds on longer sections. In 2006, a crossing was closed in the municipality of Edling for the first time and two were equipped with lights. It was planned at that time upgrade a total of 28 of the 38 existing crossings with a total investment of close to €5 million.

Also since 2004, the stations have been gradually modernised by SüdostBayernBahn and the local municipalities. The largest single measure was the approximately €800,000 for the rebuilding of Wasserburg station, funded by the town of Wasserburg with support from the State of Bavaria. A new bus station and expanded park-and-ride facilities were inaugurated on 20 October 2006.

The regular shipment of timber in Forsting was resumed in June 2005. The delivery and collection of wagons as required up to twice a week at night, starting from Mühldorf, use locomotives of class 294. Since 2008, freight trains also operate at night twice a week from Munich to Mühldorf via Wasserburg and Ebersberg.

On 2 April 2004, the town of Wasserburg am Inn took over infrastructure on the abandoned section from Wasserburg station (kilometre 0.371) up to and including Wasserburg town to secure the possibility of its subsequent reactivation. On 30 August 2012, the town of Wasserburg published in the Federal Gazette an offer to sell this section. If no buyer can be found until 30 November 2012, the municipality plans to close the line and lease it as appropriate.
