= Kirchseeon =

- Municipality
- Coat of arms

- Location of Kirchseeon within Ebersberg district
- Interactive map of Kirchseeon
- Location within Germany Location within Bavaria
- Coordinates: 48°4′23″N 11°53′10″E
- Country: Germany
- State: Bavaria
- Admin. region: Oberbayern
- District: Ebersberg

Government
  - Mayor (2020–26): Jan Paeplow (CSU)

Area
  - Total: 17.91 km^{2} (6.92 sq mi)
- Elevation: 564 m (1,850 ft)

Population (2025-12-31)
  - Total: 10,356
  - Density: 578.2/km^{2} (1,498/sq mi)
- Time zone: UTC+01:00 (CET)
  - Summer (DST): UTC+02:00 (CEST)
- Postal codes: 85614
- Dialling codes: 08091
- Vehicle registration: EBE
- Website: www.kirchseeon.de

Kirchseeon is a market town in the Upper Bavarian district of Ebersberg and lies 15 km east of Munich city limits.

The nearest communities are Grafing and Ebersberg. The Bavarian capital, Munich, can be reached by S-Bahn (line S4), which runs over the Munich–Salzburg line. Rosenheim and Wasserburg am Inn are each about 25 km away.

== History ==
Buch is Kirchseeon's oldest constituent community, having had its first documentary mention in 809. In 842, a place called Sevun was mentioned for the first time. The name Chirichsewe first appeared in the 14th century. Until secularization, the Ebersberg Monastery maintained a small branch monastery in Kirchseeon. The community grew quickly once the surrounding woodlands fell victim to a natural disaster in 1889 in the form of a nun moth infestation. The Royal Bavarian Railway decided to make use of the denuded woods by building a sleeper works at Kirchseeon in 1889 and 1890. In 1939, the community of Kirchseeon was formed out of the former community of Eglharting, which itself had been formed in 1818. Its constituent communities were the villages of Buch and Kirchseeon-Dorf as well as the hamlets of Forstseeon, Osterseeon, Neukirch, Ilching and Riedering. At the same time, the church was promoted to a parish curacy. In 1959, the community itself was raised to market town. Since Eglharting's population had risen so sharply, the new Erlöserkirche (Church of the Redeemer) was consecrated there in 1973. In 1974, a new town hall was completed.

== Population growth ==
Between 1988 and 2018 the market town's population grew by 45.9%, from 7,272 to 10,607 inhabitants.

== Coat of arms ==
Kirchseeon's arms might heraldically be described thus: In vert between two conifers with roots Or a nun moth argent.

== Community layout ==
After the Second World War, the hitherto isolated centres of Eglharting, Kirchseeon and Kirchseeon-Dorf were melded together along the Bundesstraße 304 (Munich-Wasserburg), mainly by building detached housing, with the combined centre at Kirchseeon railway station and a lesser centre at Eglharting. Supermarkets are to be found in both centres, and in Kirchseeon are many small and medium-sized shops.

Along the B 304, properties are exposed to traffic noise. Outlying areas of town, on the other hand, are very quiet.

== Constituent communities belonging to Kirchseeon ==
- Buch
- Eglharting
- Forstseeon
- Ilching
- Kirchseeon-Dorf
- Neukirch
- Osterseeon
- Riedering

== Economy and infrastructure ==
=== Established businesses ===
- One of the biggest employers in town is the Autohaus Kirchseeon, a car dealership founded in 1972. In 1976, the company was merged with the Auto-Eder-Gruppe.
- The automotive supplier Hörmann Industries is headquartered here.

== Education ==
- In Kirchseeon and its constituent communities are six kindergartens and four nursery schools.
- There is also an elementary school with one building each in Kirchseeon and Eglharting.
- A Gymnasium was opened in 2008.
- The headquarters of the Munich Berufsförderungswerk (vocational training school) with a boarding school building is to be found in Kirchseeon.

== Firefighting ==
Kirchseeon has at its disposal four fire brigades: FFW Kirchseeon Markt, FFW Kirchseeon-Dorf, FFW Eglharting and FFW Buch.

== Culture ==
=== Regular events ===
- Josefi-Markt (last Sunday in March)
- Walpurgisnacht for Kirchseeon's witches (30 April)
- May Day Celebrations with the hoisting of the Maypole in one of the districts
- Weinfest Buch der SG Edelweiß Buch (June)
- Kirchseeon Village Festival (first Saturday in July)
- Kathrein-Markt (last weekend in November)
- Perchtenlauf (weekends in December)
- Local Museum, the second Sunday of the month from October to April from 14h00 to 16h00
- Spring and Pre-Christmas Concerts (April and December) of the Kirchseeon Men's Choir

== Famous people ==
- Gregor Ebner (1892-1974), medical leader of the SS Organisation's Lebensborn, responsible for the Aryanization and kidnapping of children from occupied Eastern European countries
- Sepp Viellechner, folksinger
- Ludwig Waldleitner, film producer
- Hans Reupold, Günther Lohmeier, composers (Schariwari)
- Ursula Bittner, 1st Mayor of Kirchseeon from 1990 to 2002, and Deputy President of the Upper Bavarian District Council since 2008
- Michael Winter (*1979) participant in the 2008 Beijing Summer Olympic Games
- Sebastian Anneser (1939 - 2018) Roman Catholic Prelate and Canon of the Archdiocese of Munich and Freising (lived in Kirchseeon)
