= Grafing =

Grafing bei München
- Town
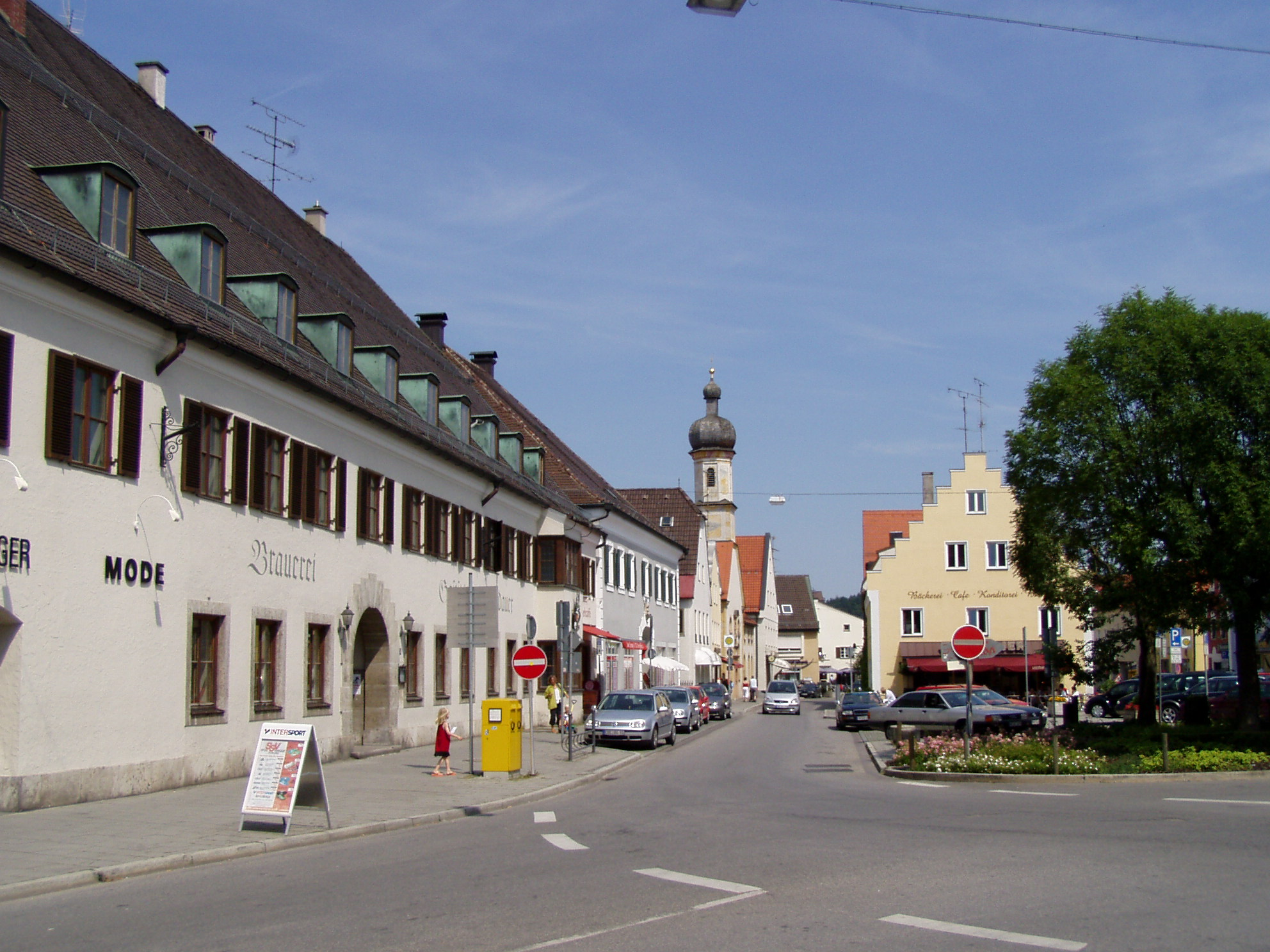
- Market square

- Coat of arms

- Location of Grafing bei München within Ebersberg district
- Interactive map of Grafing bei München
- Location within Germany Location within Bavaria
- Coordinates: 48°3′N 11°58′E
- Country: Germany
- State: Bavaria
- Admin. region: Oberbayern
- District: Ebersberg

Government
  - Mayor (2020–26): Christian Bauer (CSU)

Area
  - Total: 29.57 km^{2} (11.42 sq mi)
- Elevation: 522 m (1,713 ft)

Population (2025-12-31)
  - Total: 13,930
  - Density: 471.1/km^{2} (1,220/sq mi)
- Time zone: UTC+01:00 (CET)
  - Summer (DST): UTC+02:00 (CEST)
- Postal codes: 85567
- Dialling codes: 08092
- Vehicle registration: EBE
- Website: www.grafing.de

Grafing bei München (officially: Grafing b.München, pronounced [ˈɡʁaːfɪŋ baɪ ˈmʏnçn̩], lit. 'Grafing near Munich') is a town in the district of Ebersberg, Upper Bavaria, Germany.

== Geography ==
Grafing is in the Munich Region, about 32 km (20 mi) southeast of the state capital, where the Urtelbach and Wieshamer Bach both empty into the Attel River. The distance is roughly the same to Rosenheim and Wasserburg am Inn. Nearby municipalities are the district capital Ebersberg about 4 km (2.5 mi) to the north, Glonn and Kirchseeon.

The town has the following traditional rural land units (Gemarkungen in German): Elkofen, Grafing b.München, Nettelkofen, Oexing and Straußdorf.

Grafing station, which is to the west of the town, has access to the Munich S-Bahn network, as well as to Regional-Express and Regionalbahn trains of the national Deutsche Bahn railway company on the Munich–Salzburg railway line opened in 1870. Here the Filzenexpress line branches off to Wasserburg, served by SüdostBayernBahn trains. There is also a station called Grafing Stadt in the town, which is served by the S-Bahn.

== History ==
The town, founded about 960 as Gisling, belonged to the Munich Rentamt and the Swabian legal district in the Electorate of Bavaria. During the Thirty Years' War, Grafing was looted and set on fire by Swedish troops in 1632. Only the castle Elkofen, so the legend, was overlooked by Swedish troops.

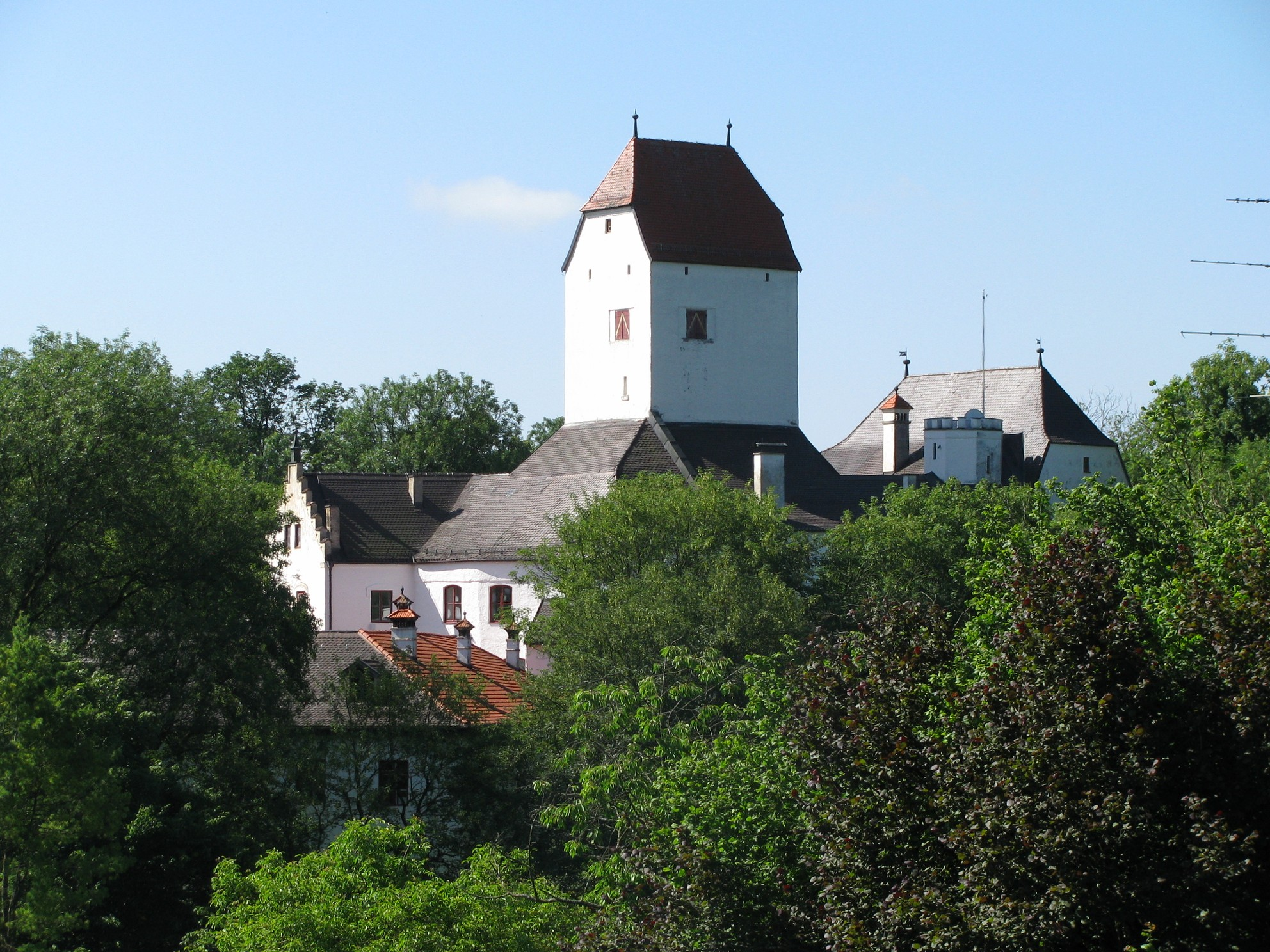
Castle Elkofen

In the course of administrative reform in the Bavarian kingdom, the Grafing municipality was established by the royal 1818 community edict. The neighbouring village of Oexing was incorporated into Grafing on 1 August 1933, after the two settlements had grown together over the decades. Several polls were held, until the citizens chose to assume the name Grafing. All that nowadays remains to recall the former two localities are the two parish churches, one in Grafing proper and the other one in former Oexing and the local ice hockey team, Oexing Killers.

Grafing moreover was home to a market court with far-reaching judicial autonomy. In 1953 the united municipality received town privileges, and with regional reform in 1978, the former communities of Elkofen, Nettelkofen and Straußdorf were merged into it.

== Population ==
- 1950: 6763
- 1970: 9426 (+39.4%)
- 1987: 11039 (+17.1%)
- 2003: 12395 (+12.3%)
- 2004: 12493 (+0.8%)
- 2006: 12543 (+0.4%)
- 2009: 12761 (+1.7%)
- 2012: 12935 (+1.4%)
- 2014: 13368 (+3.3%)
- 2018: 13800 (+3.2%)

== Politics ==
Since 2020 the mayor (Bürgermeister) is Christian Bauer (CSU). Town council seats are apportioned thus:

- CSU (9)
- Greens (7)
- Free Voters (3)
- SPD (2)
- Bavaria Party (1)
- FDP (1)
- The Left (1)

In 1999, the town's tax revenue, converted to euros, was €7,703,000, of which €1,654,000 was business taxes.

=== Coat of arms ===
Grafing's arms might heraldically be described thus: In Or a bear rampant sable armed and langued sable. The local lore has it that Emperor Ludwig the Bavarian granted the town these arms in 1325. The Grafingers had taken part in the great battle near Ampfing-Mühldorf between Kaiser Ludwig and Duke Friedrich the Handsome of Austria in 1322 with that little flag at the Emperor's side, and fought in this battle, it is said, “like bears”.

== Education ==
=== Schools ===
- Grundschule Grafing (elementary school)
- Georg-Huber-Hauptschule
- Gymnasium Grafing
- Johann-Comenius-Schule (special pedagogical continuing education centre)
- Gymnasium im Collegium Augustinum

=== Other educational institutions ===
- Volkshochschule Grafing
- Musikschule
- Kreisbildungswerk (“District Education Works”)
- Evangelisches Bildungswerk

== Sightseeing ==
- Rathaus (town hall)
- Pfarrkirche St. Ägidius (parish church)
- Marktkirche (church)
- Leonhardikirche (church)
- Wildbräugebäude (building)
- Schloss Elkofen (castle)
- Mariensäule (column)
- Heimatmuseum im Rieperdinger-Haus (“Homeland Museum”)

== Sport clubs ==
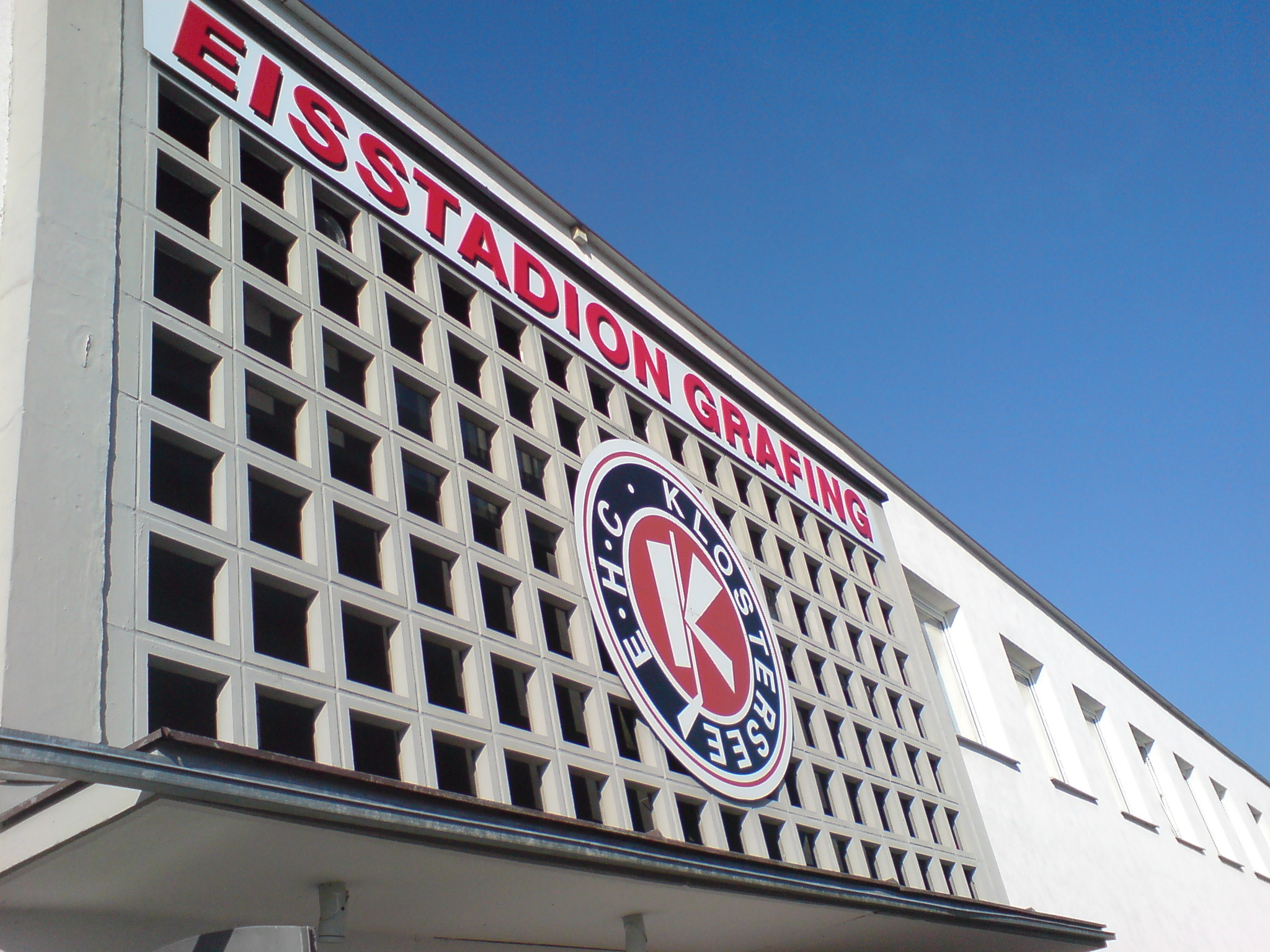
EHC stadium

The best known Grafing sport club beyond the region is EHC Klostersee. It is named after the Klostersee (lake) lying in the neighbouring town of Ebersberg where the first ice hockey games were held in the 1950s. Early on the club moved to Grafing, although it kept its name. Games are nowadays played in a purpose built arena with a first class Italian Restaurant which overlooks the playing area

The club's claim to fame is that it is the first men's hockey team to play in the Federation-wide Oberliga (Third League).

The club has also won national titles in speed skating and shorttrack speed skating events. Local shorttracker Susanne Rudolph also competed in the Olympic Winter Games in Turin.

The sport club with the most members of any in town is TSV Grafing von 1864. As well as the football division with two men's, one women's and numerous youth teams, there are also many smaller divisions within the club. Especially successful among these are the men's volleyball team, which currently plays in the Second Bundesliga South, and the women's judo team, which has met with success in the Bavarian League.

== Pictures ==
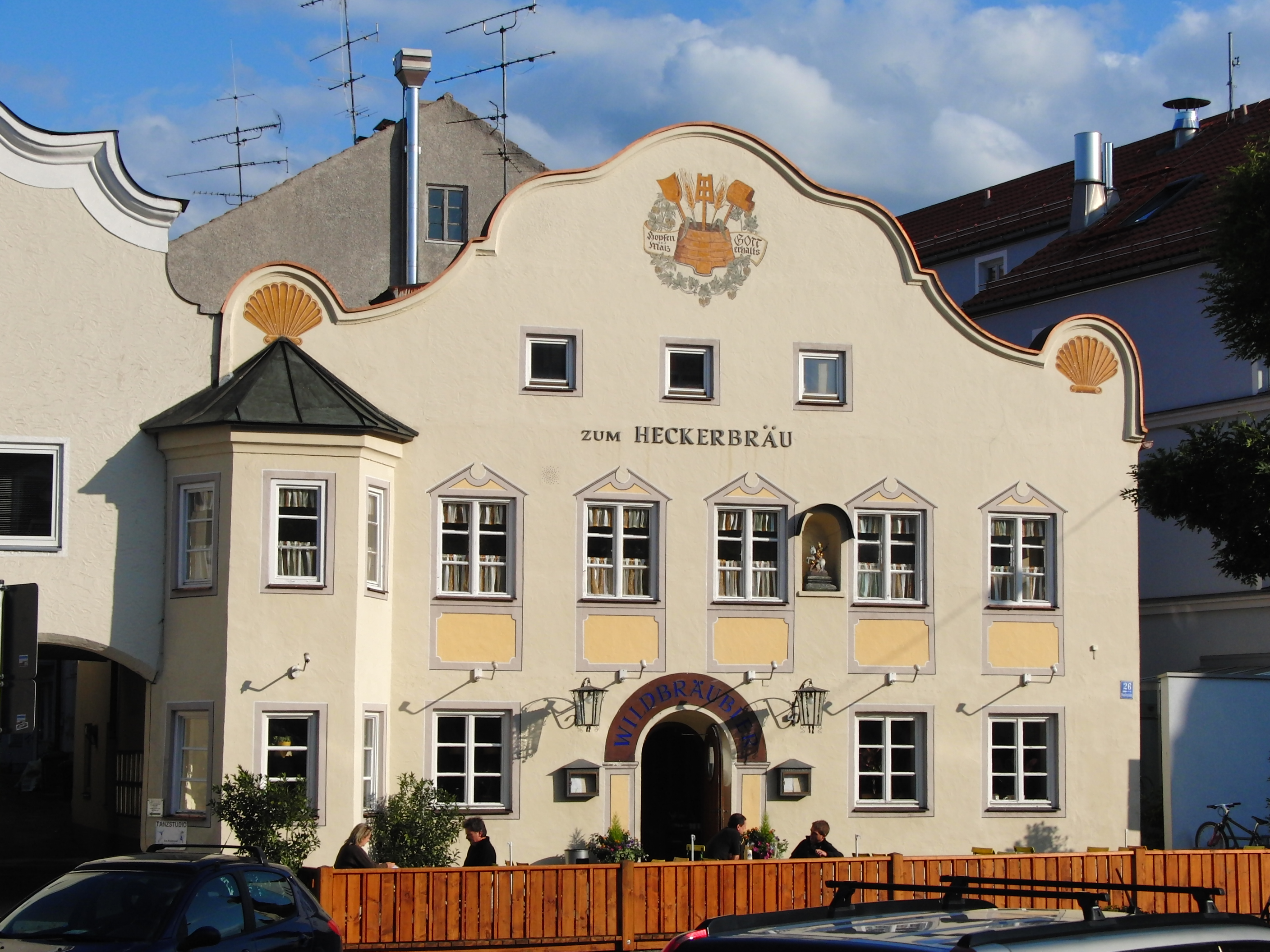
Grafing Brewery

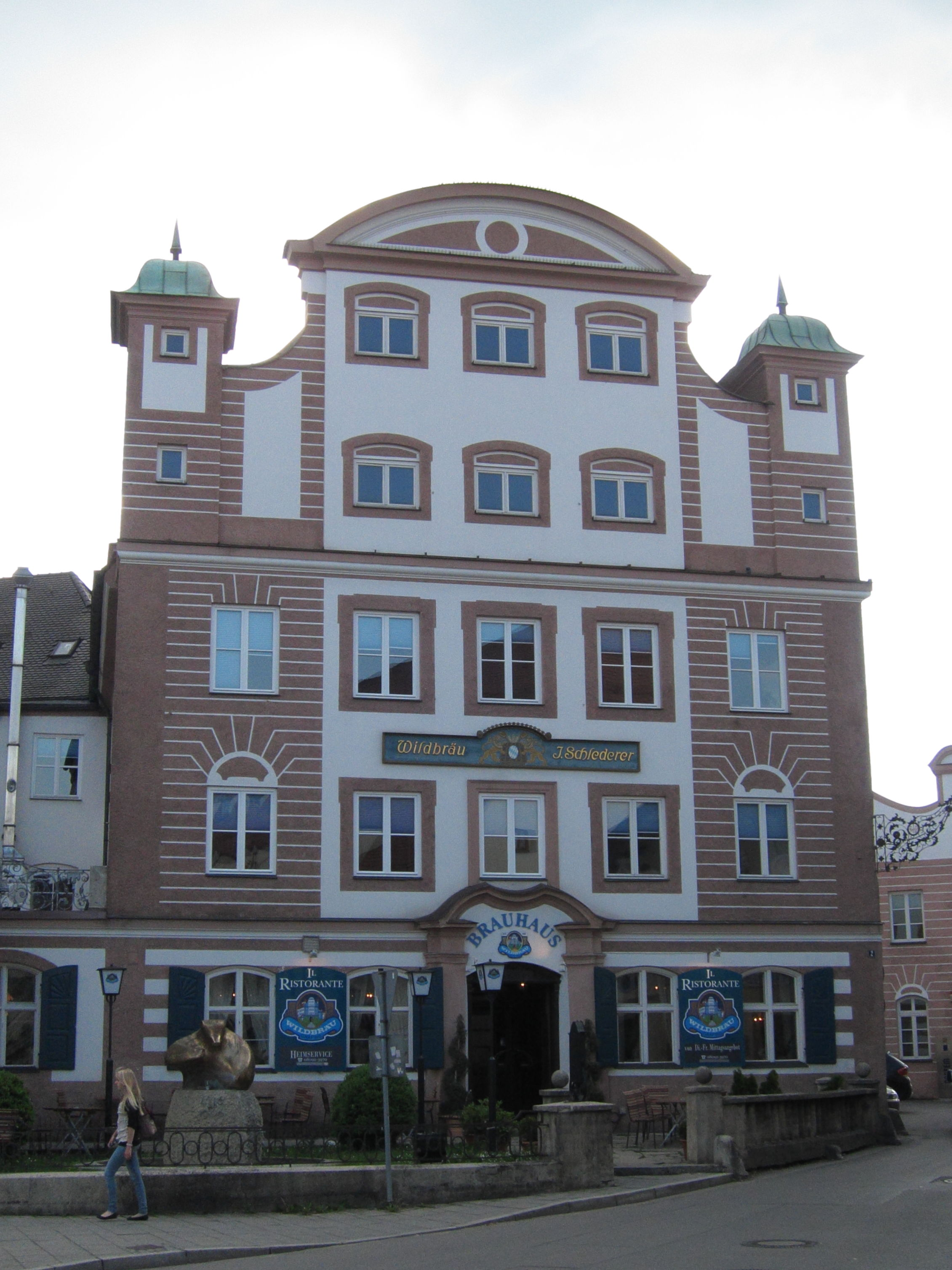
Grafing market place

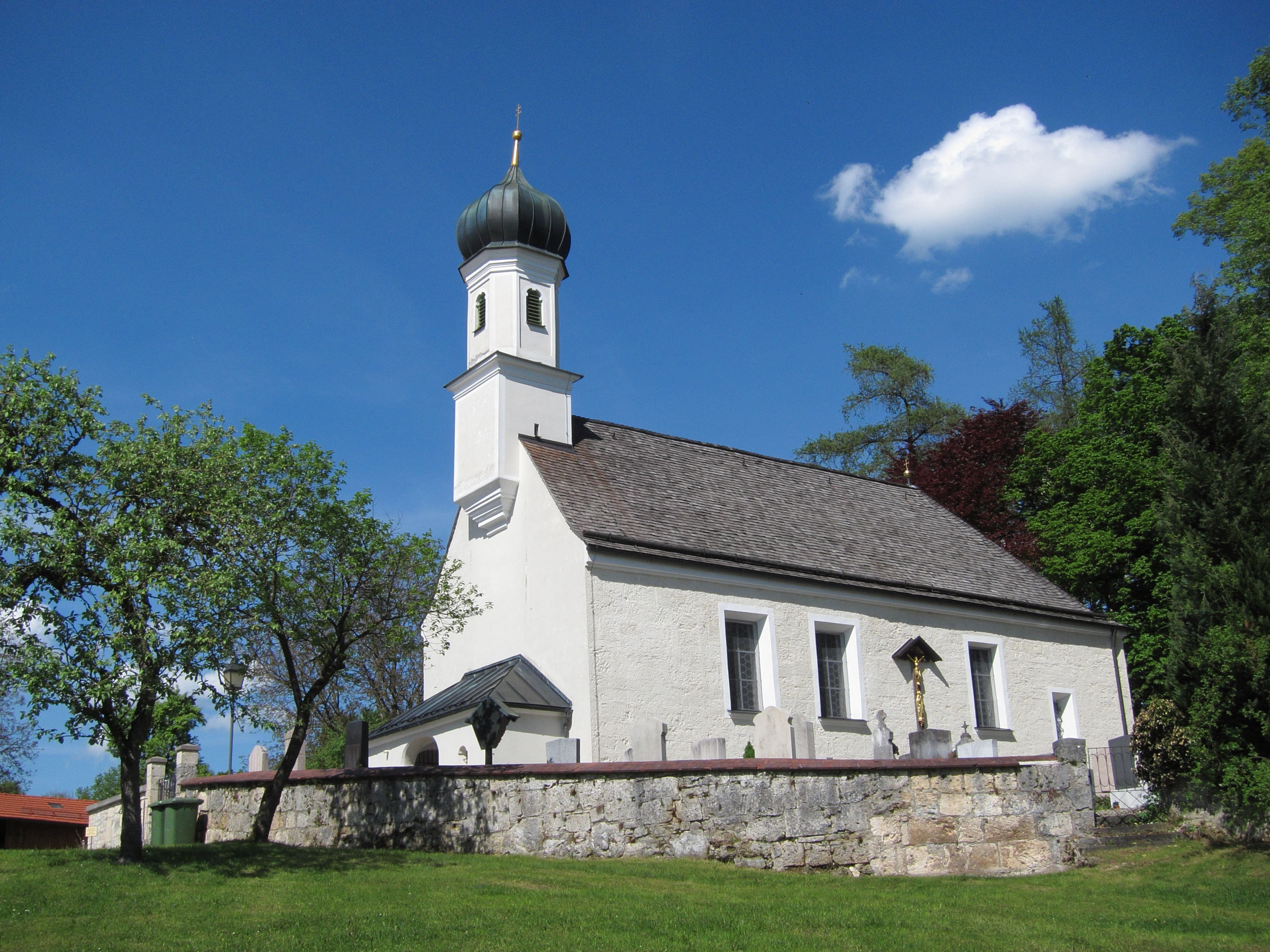
Oberelkofen church

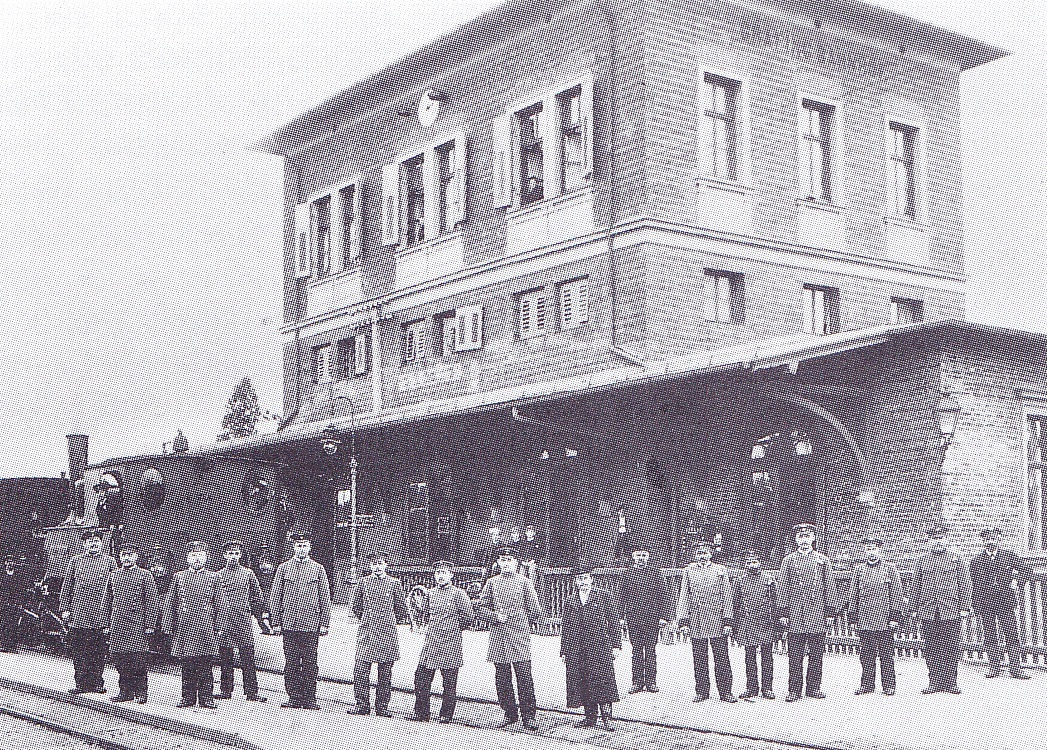
Grafing Train station around 1900

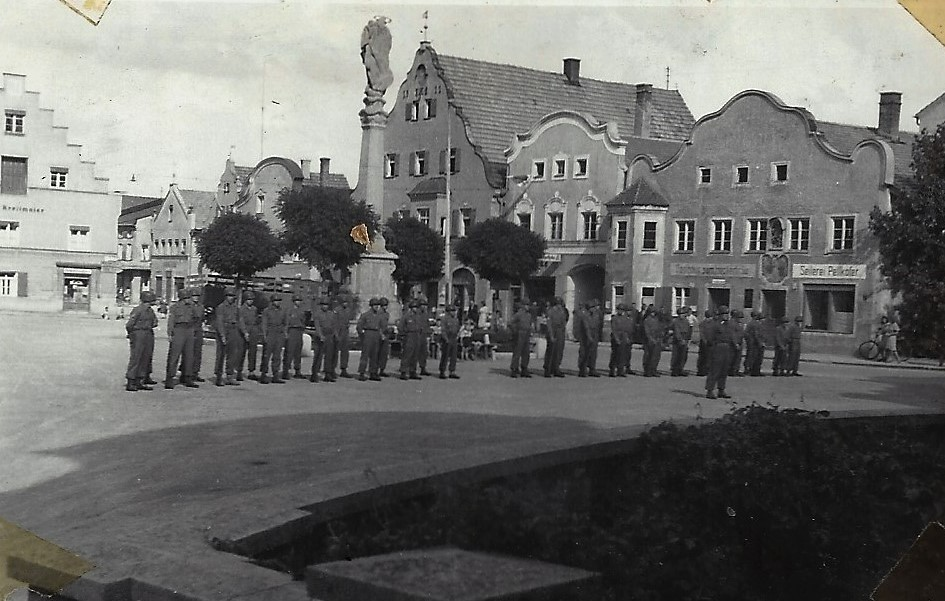
5th Ranger Battalion occupying Grafing, 1945

== Twin towns ==
Grafing is twinned with:

- Saint-Marcellin, Isère, France, since 1993

== Notable people ==
- Max Joseph Wagenbauer (1775-1829), landscape and animal painter / lithographer, royal court painter and gallery inspector
- Josef Schuster (1906-1996), German weightlifter
