= Ebersberg =

- Town
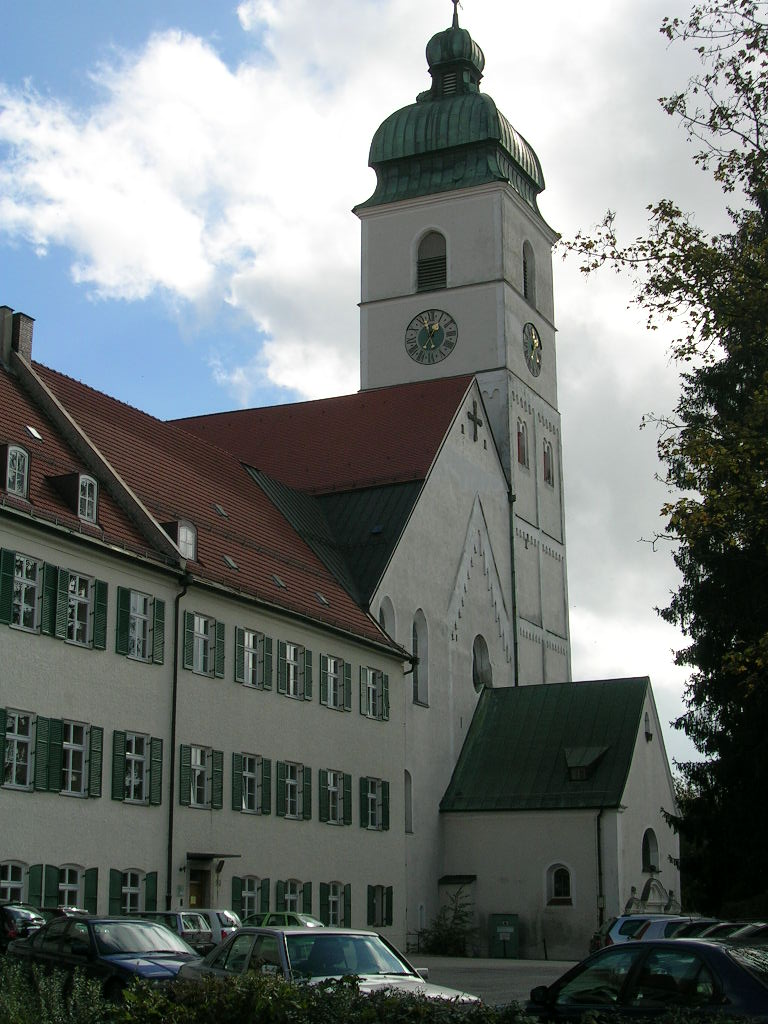
- Saint Sebastian Church

- Coat of arms

- Location of Ebersberg within Ebersberg district
- Interactive map of Ebersberg
- Location within Germany Location within Bavaria
- Coordinates: 48°05′N 11°58′E
- Country: Germany
- State: Bavaria
- Admin. region: Oberbayern
- District: Ebersberg

Government
  - Mayor (2020–26): Ulrich Proske (Ind.)

Area
  - Total: 40.84 km^{2} (15.77 sq mi)
- Elevation: 558 m (1,831 ft)

Population (2025-12-31)
  - Total: 12,340
  - Density: 302.2/km^{2} (782.6/sq mi)
- Time zone: UTC+01:00 (CET)
  - Summer (DST): UTC+02:00 (CEST)
- Postal codes: 85560
- Dialling codes: 08092
- Vehicle registration: EBE
- Website: www.ebersberg.de

Ebersberg (German pronunciation: [ˈeːbɐsˌbɛʁk]) is the seat of the similarly named Ebersberg Landkreis (district) in the Oberbayern Regierungsbezirk (administrative region) in Bavaria, southern Germany. The Ebersberger Forst (forest) is one of Germany’s largest continuous area of woodlands.

Neighbouring communities are Grafing bei München, Kirchseeon and Steinhöring. Bavaria’s capital, Munich, lies 32 km away and may be reached by Munich S-Bahn (S6). Rosenheim and Wasserburg am Inn are about the same distance away.

== History ==
Timeline of Ebersburg
← / Benedictine monastery founded; ← / Town under jurisdiction of the monastery; ← / Dissolution of the monastery; ← / Knights of Malta gained jurisdiction; ← / Elevated to the status of a town

Ebersberg’s history is closely tied with the nearby Benedictine monastery founded in 934 by the Counts of Sempt. Beginning in the 14th century the monastery exercised local jurisdiction. In 1595, Pope Clement VIII dissolved the monastery and turned its lands over to the Jesuits. On January 18, 1634, during the Thirty Years War, Ebersberg was the site of a skirmish between Habsburg troops and local peasants. The peasants, being poorly armed, were quickly defeated by the Imperial forces and around 200 were killed. Later, the ringleaders were exonerated by local authorities and found they were acting only in self-defense. In 1773, the Knights of Malta took over the building. When the monastery was dissolved for good in 1808, the building went partly to government ownership and partly private.

In 1954, Ebersberg was raised to the status of a 'town'. In 1972 it was connected to Munich by the S-Bahn highway. The once separate municipality of Oberndorf was combined with Ebersberg.

Ebersberg is the only German town that has named a street after a cabaret group (Valtortagasse, after the Gruppo di Valtorta from Ebersberg). Ebersberg’s main cultural institution, the Alte Kino Ebersberg (Old Cinema), is today run by a non-profit governing board whose roots lie in this same Deutscher Kleinkunstpreis-winning group.

== Coat of arms ==
Ebersberg’s civic coat of arms consists of a gold background with a black boar standing on a green three-knolled hill (Dreiberg, in German heraldry) on the shield’s right edge (from the armsbearer’s point of view – the left edge from the viewer’s) sloping upwards.

The town’s website includes a short summary of its history.

== Sights ==
- Wallfahrtskirche St. Sebastian (Pilgrimage church): the western portion dates from 1230, the nave and choir originate in the 15th century. From 1770 to 1783 it was remodeled in rococo style. The tomb made of red Salzburg marble at the entrance to the middle nave was made in 1500 by Wolfgang Leb. Among other sights worthy of mention are Sebastian’s Chapel with its baroque stucco work and Saint Sebastian’s reliquary, in the form of a bust, from 1450.
- Town hall (Rathaus): Today’s town hall on the Marienplatz is housed in what was once the monastery tavern.
- The Weiherkette with the Egglburger See (lake) is a favourite outing destination.
- The Ebersberg Forest has many walking paths and is also home to the Wildpark Ebersberg.
- The Heroes Avenue is an avenue of more than 80 linden trees planted in memory of each of the fallen men from Ebersberg in World War I.
- The building of the current Ebersberger Aussichtsturm (viewing tower) began in 1914 and was opened on 1 May 1915. A wooden tower, built in 1873 previously stood here. The concrete structure is 35m tall and provides a view over the Ebersberg Forest, the cities of Ebersberg and Grafing and on a clear day provides a magnificent panorama of the Alps.
- Located near the Ebersberger Aussichtsturm is the Museum für Wald und Umwelt (Environment and Forest Museum).

== Transport ==
Ebersberg has a station on the railway line between Grafing and Wasserburg and is the terminal station of line S 4 and S 6 of the Munich S-Bahn.

== Famous people ==
The following luminaries were born in Ebersberg:

- Ignaz Perner (1796–1867), founder of the animal protection movement
- Friedrich Beck (1806-1888), poet and scholar
- Josef Brendle (1888–1954), painter
- Pascalina Lehnert (Josephine Lehnert, 1894-1983), nuns, housekeeper and assistant to Pius XII.
- Ewald Schurer (1954-2017), politician (SPD), member of parliament
- Walter Zeller (1929-1995), motorcycle racing driver
- Florian Niederlechner (born 1990), soccer player

== Working or living in the village ==
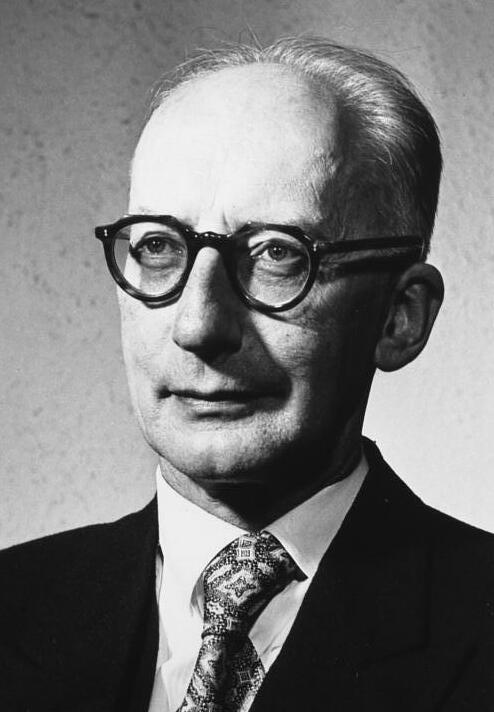
Josef Wintrich 1951

- Josef Wintrich (1891-1958), jurist, second president of the Bundesverfassungsgericht (1954-1958); was transferred from Munich to Ebersberg as supreme judge in 1933 because of his interest in the many deaths in the Dachau concentration camp,
- Horst Mahler (born 1936), German political activist, former member of the Red Army Faction, lawyer and neo-Nazi, who was repeatedly convicted of incitement, terrorism and robbery, lived in Ebersberg

== Honorary citizens ==
- Martin Guggetzer (1872–1950), Catholic priest, honoured 1946
- Manfred Bergmeister (born 1927), smith and founding member of the Munich Handicraft Academy (Akademie Handwerk München), holder of the Order of Merit of the Federal Republic of Germany and the Bavarian Order of Merit, honoured 1997

== See also ==
- Counts of Ebersberg (German Wikipedia)
- Williram of Ebersberg
- Ebersberg Monastery (German Wikipedia)
