= Steinhöring =

- Municipality
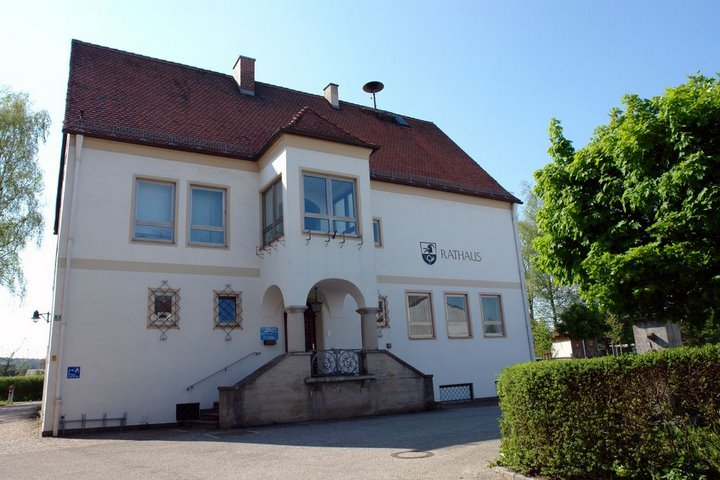
- Town hall

- Coat of arms

- Location of Steinhöring within Ebersberg district
- Interactive map of Steinhöring
- Location within Germany Location within Bavaria
- Coordinates: 48°5′N 12°2′E
- Country: Germany
- State: Bavaria
- Admin. region: Oberbayern
- District: Ebersberg

Government
  - Mayor (2020–26): Martina Lietsch

Area
  - Total: 36.29 km^{2} (14.01 sq mi)
- Elevation: 519 m (1,703 ft)

Population (2025-12-31)
  - Total: 3,940
  - Density: 109/km^{2} (281/sq mi)
- Time zone: UTC+01:00 (CET)
  - Summer (DST): UTC+02:00 (CEST)
- Postal codes: 85643
- Dialling codes: 08094
- Vehicle registration: EBE
- Website: www.gemeinde-steinhoering.de

Steinhöring is a community in the Upper Bavarian district of Ebersberg.

== Geography ==
Steinhöring lies in the Munich Region. It lies in the south-east of the Ebersberger Forst (forest) which is one of the largest continuous area of woodlands in Germany.

It includes two traditional rural land units (Gemarkungen in German) named Sankt Christoph and Steinhöring.

Neighbouring communities are Ebersberg, Hohenlinden and Frauenneuharting.

=== Subdivisions ===
Steinhöring is divided into many boroughs:

Sankt Christoph and Tulling; Abersdorf, Berg, Endorf, Hintsberg, Schützen und Sensau; the hamlets Aschau, Au, Dichtlmühle, Dietmering, Elchering, Etzenberg, Graben, Höhenberg, Holzhäusln, Kraiß, Niederaltmannsberg, Oberseifsieden, Ötzmann, Rupertsdorf, Schechen, Sprinzenöd, Unterseifsieden, Wall, Welling, Winkl and Zaißing as well as the housing-groups of Blöckl, Buchschechen, Helletsgaden, Hofstett, Hub, Lehen, Lieging, Mayrhof, Meiletskirchen, Neuhardsberg, Oed, Oelmühle, Ranhartsberg, Salzburg, Schätzl, Schweig, Stinau, Thailing, Untermeierhof and Winkl b. Sankt Christoph.

== History ==
The community’s first documentary mention was in 824. By the 16th century, Steinhöring boasted a regionally important postal station. It belonged to the Rentamt of Munich and the Court of Swabia of the Electorate of Bavaria and was the seat of a captaincy (Hauptmannschaft).

In 1936, the Nazi racial organization Lebensborn’s first “Mother-Child-Home” (Mutter-Kind-Heim) was opened in Steinhöring.

In the course of administrative reforms in Bavaria, the current community came into being with the community edict in 1818. In 1972, the former community of St. Christoph was amalgamated with Steinhöring.

=== Population development ===
The community’s land area was home to 2,395 inhabitants in 1970, 3,068 in 1987 and 3,540 in 2000.

== Politics ==
The mayor (Bürgermeister) is Martina Lietsch (FLS). The municipal council consists of 16 politicians.

The community’s tax revenue for 2010 was €2,545,000, of which €392,000 was business taxes.

=== Coat of arms ===
Steinhöring’s arms might heraldically be described thus: Party per fess, above in argent a half ibex rampant sable, below in azure a horizontal postal horn argent.

=== Education ===
In 2010, the following institutions existed in Steinhöring:

- Kindergartens: 3 Kindergartens with, 1 of them integrates also handicapped children and works on basis of Montessori pedagogics
- Elementary school
- School for handicapped children
