= S4 (Munich) =

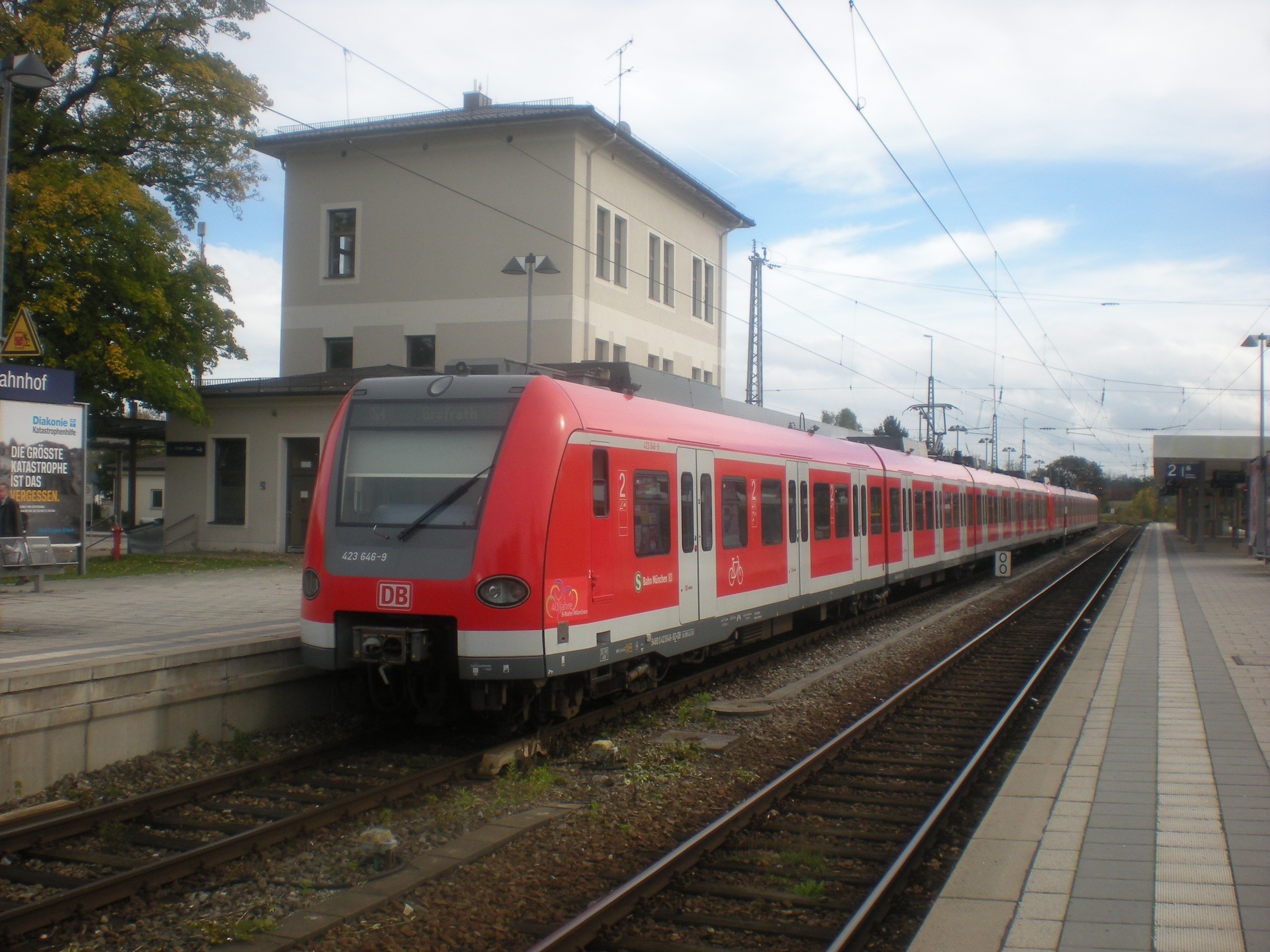

Overview
- Line number: S4
- Locale: Munich, Bavaria, Germany

Service
- System: Munich S-Bahn
- Route number: 999.4
- Operator(s): S-Bahn Munich
- Rolling stock: DBAG Class 423

Technical
- Electrification: 15 kV, 16.7 Hz AC Overhead lines

Line S4 is a line on the Munich S-Bahn network. It is operated by DB Regio Bayern. It runs from Geltendorf station to Ebersberg station via Pasing, central Munich, Munich East and Grafing station.

The line is operated at 20-minute intervals between Grafrath or Buchenau and Grafing station. Two out of three trains an hour continue from Buchenau to Geltendorf and from Grafing station to Ebersberg, so that the gap between trains alternates between 20 and 40 minutes. It is operated using class 423 four-car electrical multiple units, usually as two coupled sets. In the evenings and on Sundays they generally run as single sets.

The line runs over lines built at various times:

- from Geltendorf to Pasing over the Munich–Buchloe railway, opened by the Royal Bavarian State Railways on 1 May 1873
- from Pasing to the approaches to Munich Central Station (Hauptbahnhof) over a section of the S-Bahn trunk line laid parallel to the Munich–Augsburg railway, opened by the Munich–Augsburg Railway Company from Munich to Pasing on 1 September 1839
- the underground section of the S-Bahn trunk line from the approaches to Munich Central Station to Munich East station, opened on 1 May 1971
- from Munich East station to Grafing station on the Munich–Rosenheim railway, opened by the Royal Bavarian State Railways on 15 October 1871 and electrified on 12 April 1927.
- from Grafing station to Ebersberg over the Grafing–Wasserburg railway, opened by the Royal Bavarian State Railways on 6 November 1899 and electrified in 1969.

S-Bahn services on line S 4 between Geltendorf and Ebersberg commenced on 28 May 1972. For a period up to 2009, the section from Munich East to Ebersberg was operated as the former line S 5.
