= Haar station =

Railway station in Germany

Haar
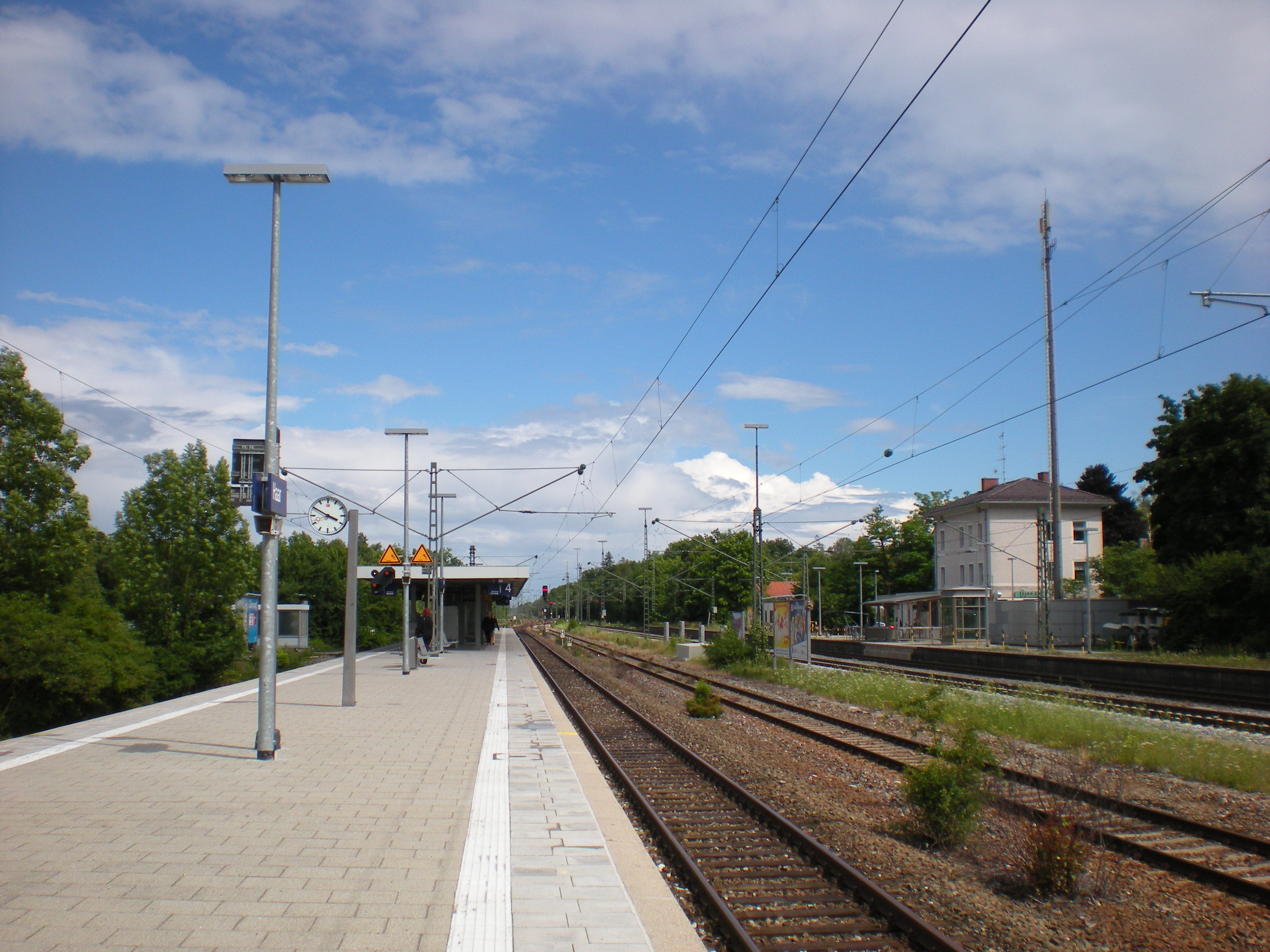
- 2012

General information
- Location: Bahnhofplatz 1; 85540 Haar; Bavaria; Germany
- Coordinates: 48.1110°N 11.7312°E
- System: Bf
- Owner: Deutsche Bahn
- Operator: DB Netz; DB Station&Service
- Lines: Munich–Rosenheim railway (KBS 950)
- Platforms: 1 island platform
- Tracks: 5
- Train operators: S-Bahn München
- Connections: 230, 241, 242, 243, X202, X203

Construction
- Parking: yes
- Cycle facilities: yes
- Accessible: yes

Other information
- Station code: 2443
- DS100 code: MHR
- IBNR: 8002491
- Category: 4
- Fare zone: : M and 1
- Website: www.bahnhof.de

History
- Opened: 15 October 1871; 154 years ago

Services
Preceding station	Munich S-Bahn	Following station
Gronsdorf towards Geltendorf	S4 selected trains only	Vaterstetten towards Ebersberg
Gronsdorf towards Tutzing	S6	Vaterstetten towards Ebersberg
Location
- Location within Bavaria Location within Germany Location within Europe

Haar station (German: Bahnhof Haar) is a railway station in the municipality of Haar, located in the Munich district in Bavaria, Germany.
