= Gronsdorf station =

Railway station in Haar, Germany

Gronsdorf
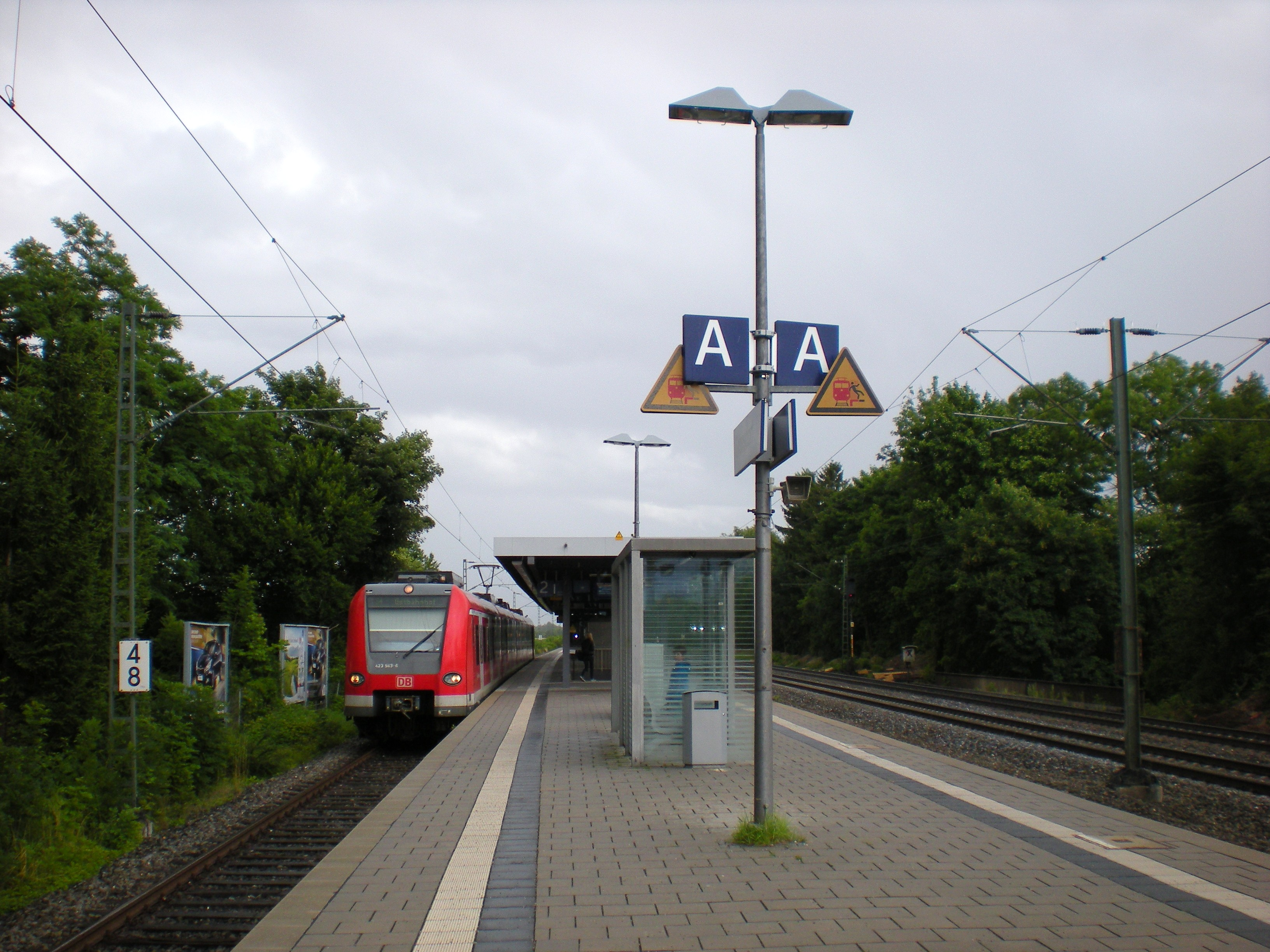
- 2012

General information
- Location: Schneiderhofstraße; 85540 Gronsdorf; Bavaria; Germany
- Coordinates: 48.1183°N 11.6991°E
- System: Hp
- Owner: Deutsche Bahn
- Operator: DB Netz; DB Station&Service
- Lines: Munich–Rosenheim railway (KBS 950)
- Platforms: 1 island platform
- Tracks: 4
- Train operators: S-Bahn München
- Connections: 242

Construction
- Parking: yes
- Cycle facilities: yes
- Accessible: yes

Other information
- Station code: 2290
- DS100 code: MGDF
- IBNR: 8002383
- Category: 4
- Fare zone: : M and 1
- Website: www.bahnhof.de

History
- Opened: 1 May 1897; 129 years ago

Services
Preceding station	Munich S-Bahn	Following station
Munich-Trudering towards Geltendorf	S4 selected trains only	Haar towards Ebersberg
Munich-Trudering towards Tutzing	S6	Haar towards Ebersberg
Location
- Location within Bavaria Location within Germany Location within Europe

Gronsdorf station (German: Haltepunkt Gronsdorf) is a railway station in the municipality of Haar, located in the Munich district in Bavaria, Germany.

The Gronsdorf stop, located on the city border between Munich and the municipality of Haar, was subsequently established on 1 May 1897. It is located between the Munich district of Waldtrudering and the Haar settlement of Gronsdorf, after which it is named. The stop has an island platform that can be reached via an underpass. Since 1972 only S-Bahn trains stop in Gronsdorf.
