= Vaterstetten =

- Municipality
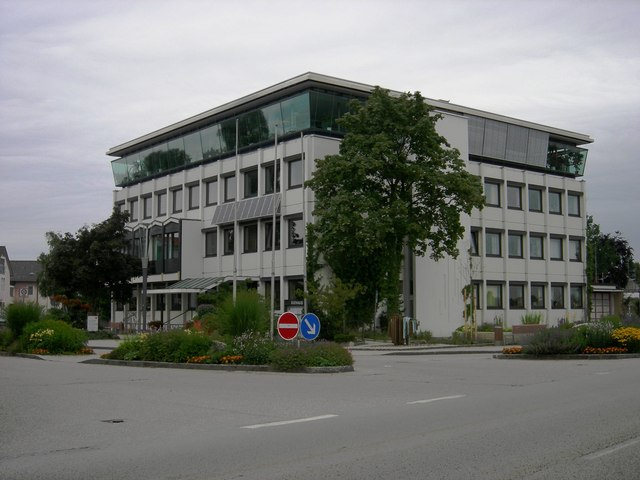
- Town hall

- Coat of arms

- Location of Vaterstetten within Ebersberg district
- Interactive map of Vaterstetten
- Location within Germany Location within Bavaria
- Coordinates: 48°06′18″N 11°46′14″E
- Country: Germany
- State: Bavaria
- Admin. region: Upper Bavaria
- District: Ebersberg
- Subdivisions: 7 officially named centres

Government
  - Mayor (2020–26): Leonhard Spitzauer (CSU)

Area
  - Total: 34.08 km^{2} (13.16 sq mi)
- Elevation: 528 m (1,732 ft)

Population (2025-12-31)
  - Total: 25,039
  - Density: 734.7/km^{2} (1,903/sq mi)
- Time zone: UTC+01:00 (CET)
  - Summer (DST): UTC+02:00 (CEST)
- Postal codes: 85591
- Dialling codes: 08106
- Vehicle registration: EBE
- Website: www.vaterstetten.de

Vaterstetten (German pronunciation: [faːtɐˈʃtɛtn̩]) is a municipality in the Upper Bavarian district of Ebersberg. It lies east of Munich and is the district's biggest community. Vaterstetten is on the outskirts of Munich, roughly twenty minutes by S-Bahn from Marienplatz.

== Geography ==
=== Location ===
Vaterstetten borders in the north on the community of Poing, in the northeast on the community of Anzing, in the east on the unincorporated area of the Ebersberg Forest (Ebersberger Forst), in the southeast on the community of Zorneding (all in Ebersberg district), in the southwest on the community of Grasbrunn, and in the west on the communities of Haar and Feldkirchen (all three in Munich district).

=== Constituent communities ===
The community consists of the constituent centres of Baldham, Hergolding, Neufarn, Parsdorf, Purfing, Vaterstetten and Weißenfeld.

== History ==
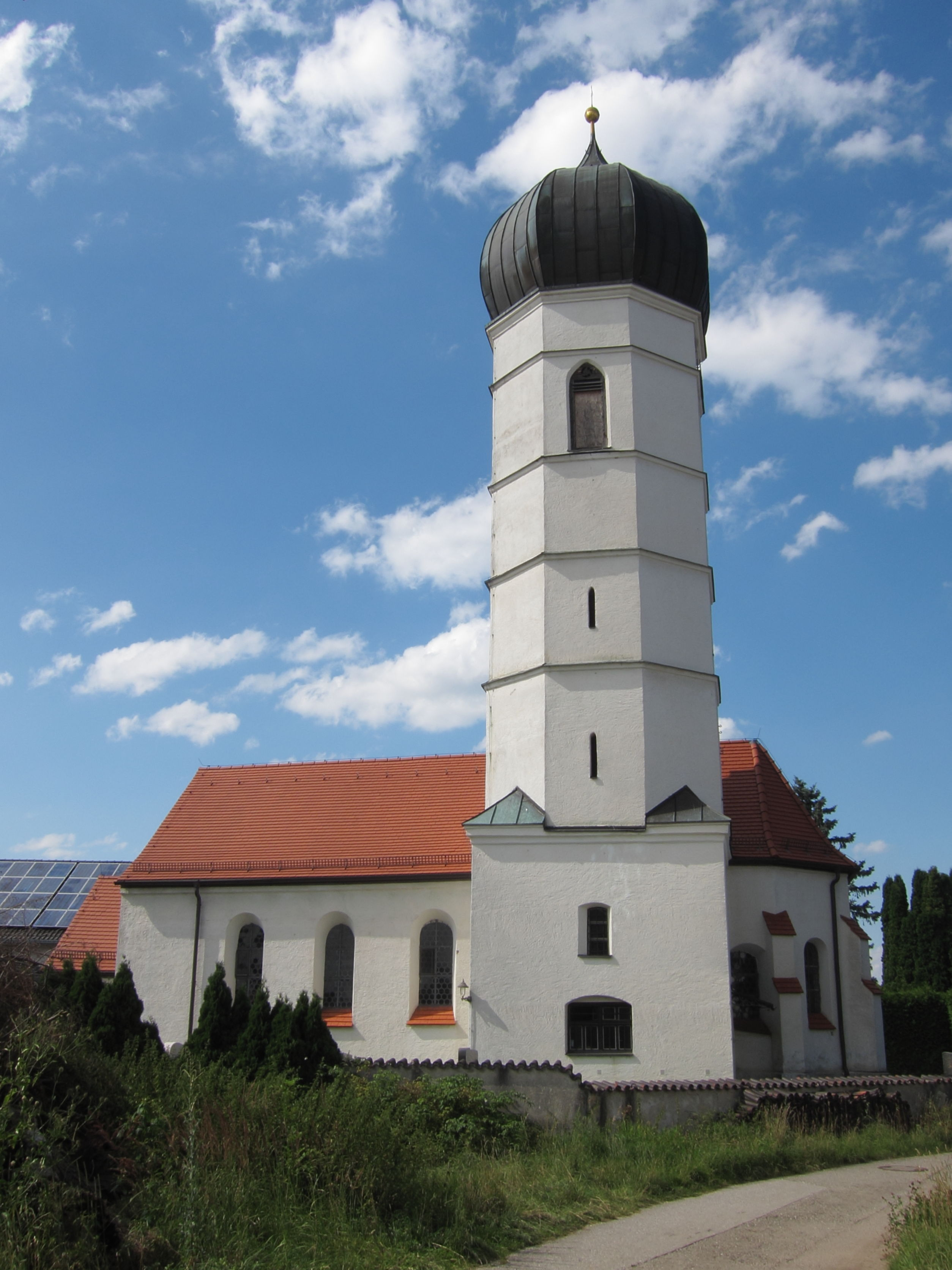
Weißenfeld church

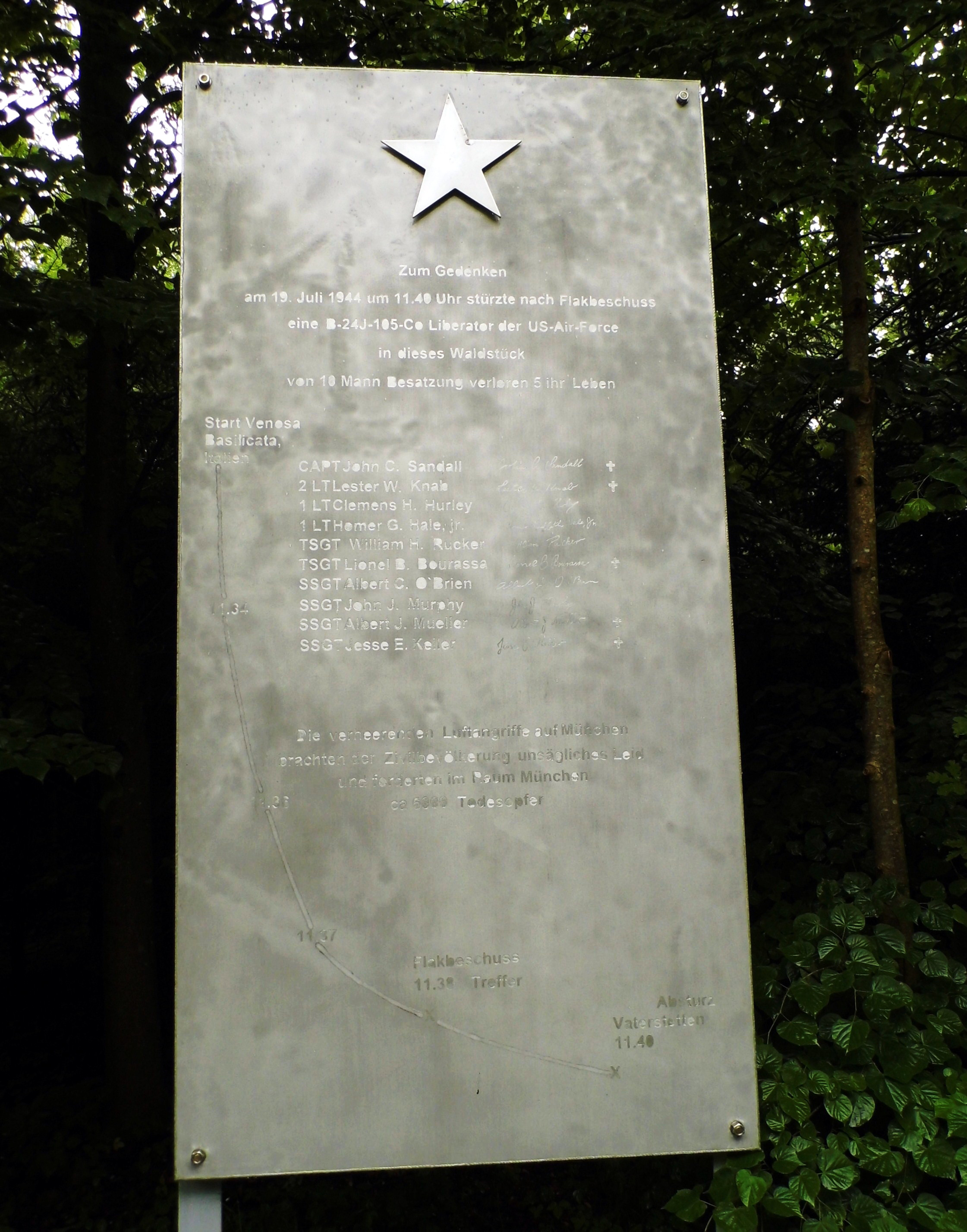
Soldier killed in action - USAAF B-24J Liberator shot down by German Flak on July 19th, 1944

Because of being on the border of the sandur of Munich, an early settlement in the southern part of today's community area is unlikely, because the tillage was disadvantaged here compared to the northern part. Consequently, the oldest town of the community is Purfing, where a settlement from the period between 750 and 600 BC was found.

Vaterstetten was founded by the Old Bavarii Fater family.

Until 1056 the district of Weißenfeld (Wizzinvelt) was in the possession of the Holy Roman Emperor Henry III as a Reichsgut. The fact he instructed his wife about negotiations over his ownership on these lands on his deathbed in the year 1056, shows how significant they must have been for him.

It was here in the summer of 1800 that the Parsdorf Ceasefire was signed by Major General Franz Joseph of Dietrichstein and General Jean Victor Moreau, which later came to an end with the Battle of Hohenlinden. In 1818, when there was the Royal Bavarian territorial reform, the community of Parsdorf was founded and it replaced the former "Steuerdistricts". The administrative seat of the community was transferred to Parsdorf probably because of its important coaching inn.

An increase of the population of the community began with the connection to the rail network in 1871.

In 1913 physicist and philosopher Ernst Mach settled in Vaterstetten, where he died 1916.

The district of Baldham was selected as a location for the studio of Hitler's sculptor Josef Thorak before the beginning of World War II. The building, which was created by Albert Speer, is now a branch of the Bavarian State Archaeological Collection in Munich. On 5 May 1945, the delegations of the German Army Group G and the 7th U.S. Army met here to discuss the surrender of the 200,000 German soldiers in southern Germany, which was finally signed in the neighbour community of Haar.

On 19 July 1944, a US Consolidated B-24 bomber crashed into the forest between Vaterstetten and the neighbouring town of Ottendichl (part of Haar). In 2009, the place has been marked by a memorial plaque.

The current community of Vaterstetten came into being with the municipal reform of 1978. The old community included all the same current centres as are now found in Vaterstetten, but it was named Parsdorf. On 1 May 1978, the community's name was changed to Vaterstetten, by which time the community's main centre had long been of that same name, along with Baldham. Before that reform, a part of Baldham (named Baldham-Kolonie) belonged to Zorneding.

== Economy ==
=== Transport ===
Vaterstetten is part of the Munich Transport and Tariff Association (Münchner Verkehrs- und Tarifverbund, or MVV). The Munich S-Bahn’s lines S4 and S6 run over the Munich–Rosenheim line through the community serving the Vaterstetten and Baldham stations.

Four buslines of the Vaterstettener Innerörtlicher Personennahverkehr (Vaterstetten Local Passenger Transport, or VIP) run regularly in the local area.

The name Vaterstetten is well known to many motorists for its Autobahn roadhouse lying on the A99. The Autobahn itself runs by the community about one kilometre away. Through the community’s south end runs the Wasserburger Landstraße (officially named B304), one of Munich’s main arterial roads.

=== Educational institutions ===
Within the community stand four elementary schools, a Hauptschule, a Realschule and the Humboldt-Gymnasium Vaterstetten, as well as a folk high school and a music school.

== Town partnerships ==
- since 1982 with Allauch (France)
- since 1994 with Alem Katema (Ethiopia)
- since 2009 with Trogir (Croatia)

== Regular events ==
- Street Festival in June
- Töpfermarkt (potter market) in the Freizeitpark, always in mid-October
- Volksfest (folk festival)
- Sonnwendfeuer (solstice festival)

== Community development ==
=== Population development ===
Year	Inhabitants
1867	175
1910	1,407
1925	1,565
1939	1,837
1945	1,300
1961	5,420
1987	17,843
2002	21,113
2006	21,401
2008	21,697
2011	21,286
2013	22,087
2015	22,768
2016	22,936
2017	23,229
2018	23,422

(1910, 1925, 1939, 1961, 1987: census results)
