= Vaterstetten station =

Railway station in Vaterstetten, Germany

Vaterstetten

General information
- Location: Südliche Bahnhofstraße; 85591 Vaterstetten; Bavaria; Germany
- Coordinates: 48.104093°N 11.764590°E -->
- System: Hp
- Owner: Deutsche Bahn
- Operator: DB Netz; DB Station&Service
- Lines: Munich–Rosenheim railway (KBS 950)
- Platforms: 1 island platform
- Tracks: 4
- Train operators: S-Bahn München
- Connections: 451, 452

Construction
- Parking: yes
- Cycle facilities: yes
- Accessible: yes

Other information
- Station code: 6395
- DS100 code: MVS
- IBNR: 8006059
- Category: 5
- Fare zone: : 1 and 2
- Website: www.bahnhof.de

History
- Opened: 1 May 1897; 129 years ago

Services
Preceding station	Munich S-Bahn	Following station
Haar towards Geltendorf	S4 selected trains only	Baldham towards Ebersberg
Haar towards Tutzing	S6	Baldham towards Ebersberg
Location
- Location within Bavaria Location within Germany Location within Europe

Vaterstetten station (German: Haltepunkt Vaterstetten) is a railway station in the municipality of Vaterstetten, located in the Ebersberg district in Bavaria, Germany.

The halt of Vaterstetten was opened on 1 May 1897. Today, the station is served only by the S-Bahn. The island platform can be reached via an underpass.
