= Zorneding =

- Municipality
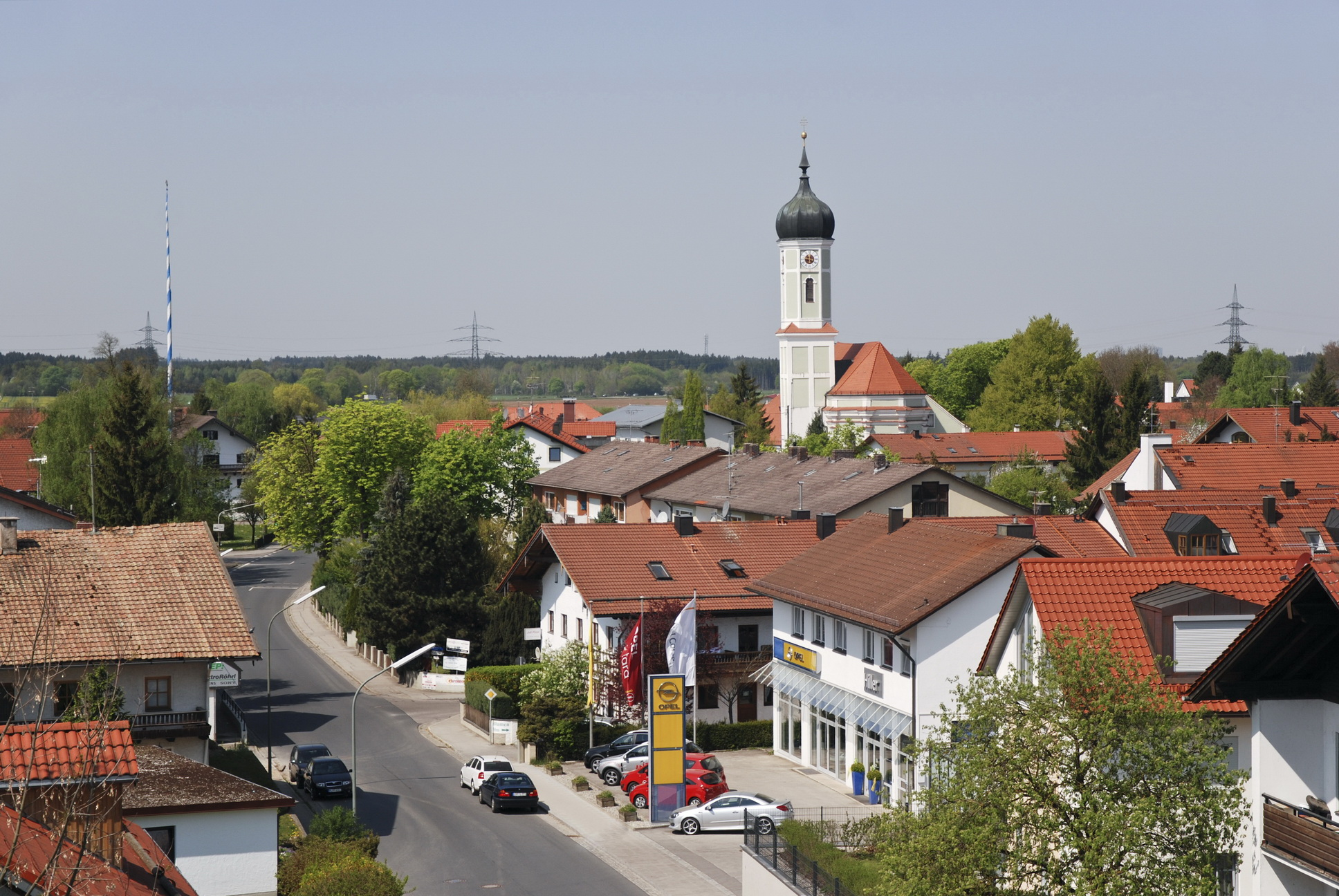
- View of the center of Zorneding

- Coat of arms

- Location of Zorneding within Ebersberg district
- Interactive map of Zorneding
- Location within Germany Location within Bavaria
- Coordinates: 48°5′N 11°50′E
- Country: Germany
- State: Bavaria
- Admin. region: Oberbayern
- District: Ebersberg
- Subdivisions: Zorneding, Pöring, Ingelsberg and Wolfesing

Government
  - Mayor (2020–26): Piet Mayr (CSU)

Area
  - Total: 23.79 km^{2} (9.19 sq mi)
- Elevation: 555 m (1,821 ft)

Population (2025-12-31)
  - Total: 9,417
  - Density: 395.8/km^{2} (1,025/sq mi)
- Time zone: UTC+01:00 (CET)
  - Summer (DST): UTC+02:00 (CEST)
- Postal codes: 85604
- Dialling codes: 0 81 06
- Vehicle registration: EBE
- Website: www.zorneding.de

Zorneding (German pronunciation: [ˈtsɔʁnədɪŋ]) is a community in district of Ebersberg, Upper Bavaria, Germany. It lies some 20 km east of Munich, Bavaria’s capital.

== Geography ==
=== Neighbouring communities ===
In the northwest, Zorneding borders on the town of Vaterstetten, in the northeast on the unincorporated area of the Ebersberg Forest (Ebersberger Forst), in the east on Kirchseeon, in the south on Oberpframmern and in the southwest on Munich district.

== History ==
Zorneding had its first documentary mention on 4 September 813. A further documentary mention comes from the year 1156 when Zorneding was mentioned in the Falkensteiner Codex under the name Ingoltesperch (“Settlement at Ingolt’s Mountain”). Ludwig V, Duke of Upper Bavaria, Margrave of Tyrol and Brandenburg died in Zorneding in 1361 while hunting. Over the centuries, Zorneding grew ever more into a typical road-based town. The ancient Salt Road (nowadays Bundesstraße 304) gained more and more importance after Munich was founded. Pöring, with its centres of Ingelsberg and Wolfesing is a clearing settlement from the 6th and 7th centuries. In 885, “Peringan” had its first documentary mention. In 1156, “Ingoltesperch” was mentioned, and in 1269 so was “Wolfizzingen”. In 1750, Wolfesing was amalgamated with Pöring, and in 1815 so was Ingelsberg. In 1978, on the occasion of municipal reform, Pöring and Zorneding were merged into one community. At the same time, the centre of Baldham was transferred to Vaterstetten.

=== Coats of arms ===
Zorneding

Zorneding’s municipal arms show the Brandenburg eagle holding two charred boughs, one in each talon. The eagle goes back to Ludwig V who died in 1361 in Zorneding. To commemorate this event, the community took up the eagle as a charge in its arms, since Ludwig was from Brandenburg. The burnt boughs refer to the clearing.

Pöring’s arms show two silver points and a yellow partridge on a blue background. It symbolizes the holder of the Pöring noble seat.

== Culture and sightseeing ==
=== Buildings ===
- St. Martin (parish church), late Baroque, built 1719 to 1723, late Gothic Madonna at the choir arch, Gothic baptismal font, richly stuccoed.
- St. Georg in Pöring, Baroque, building begun 1696, consecration 1707.

=== Parks ===
There are many hiking and cycling paths in the Ebersberg Forest.

=== Transport ===
The constituent community of Zorneding lies on Bundesstraße 304. On 7 June 2005, the sod was turned to begin construction on a community bypass running south of town. The 4.2 km-long roadway opened to traffic on 3 July 2007. After the opening, traffic through the community was greatly reduced from a former 20,000 vehicles a day to roughly 2,000 now.

The railway station in Zorneding lies on the Munich–Rosenheim line, but is not a stop for regional trains. Zorneding is connected to Munich by Munich S-Bahn’s lines S4 and S6 and to the district capital of Ebersberg by the S4 line. There was formerly also a bus connection to Glonn by way of Oberpframmern and this is still the route for the weekend on-call taxi service. The bus service was redirected to Höhenkirchen-Siegertsbrunn from December 2023.

=== Educational institutions ===
The community is home to the Grundschule Zorneding with its two buildings in Zorneding and Pöring. This school recently celebrated its 350th birthday.
