= Baldham station =

Railway station in Baldham, Germany

Baldham
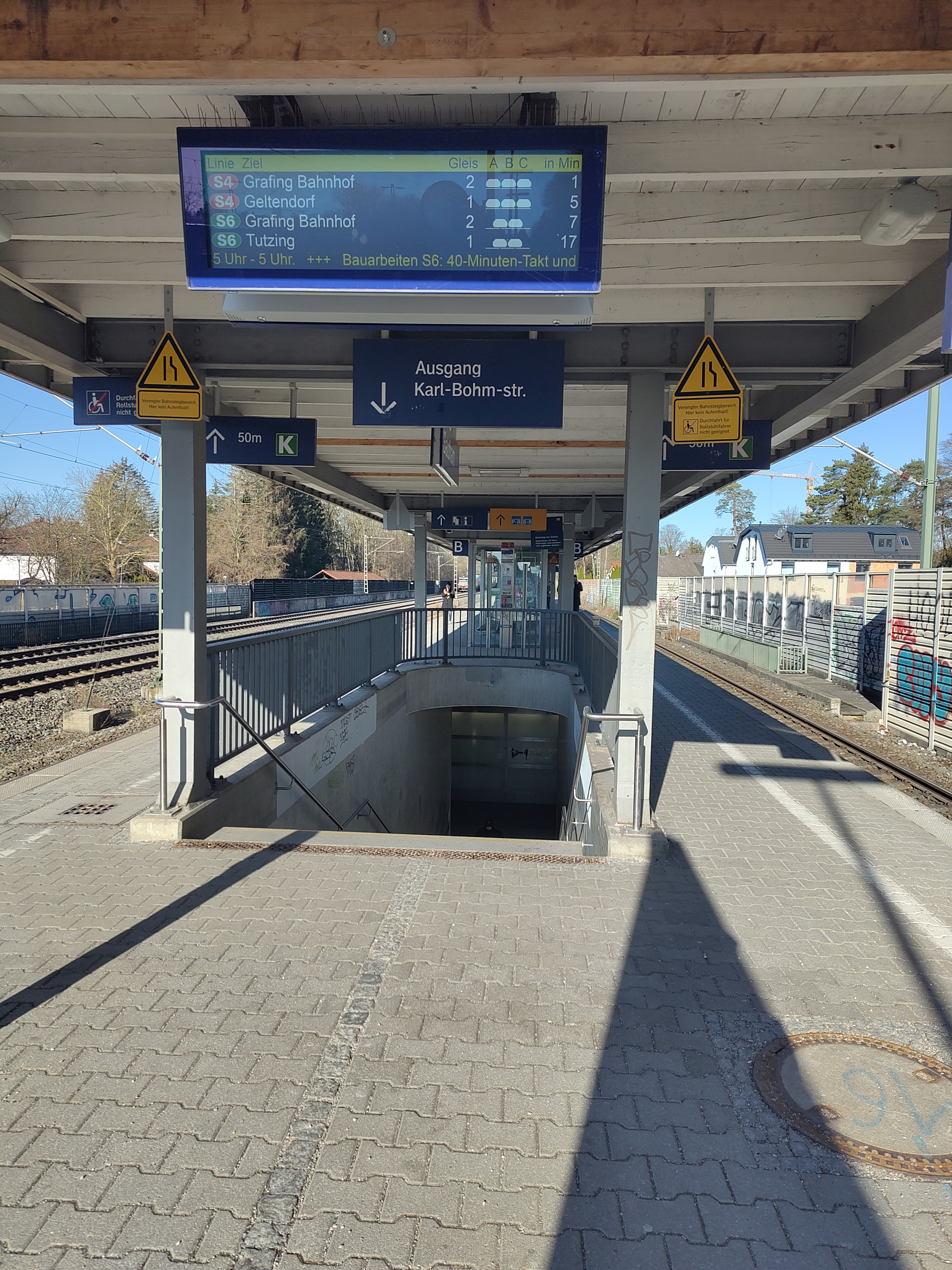

General information
- Location: Bahnhofplatz; 85598 Baldham; Bavaria; Germany
- Coordinates: 48.099251°N 11.786923°E
- Owner: Deutsche Bahn
- Operator: DB Netz; DB Station&Service
- Lines: Munich–Rosenheim railway (KBS 950)
- Platforms: 1 island platform
- Tracks: 4
- Train operators: S-Bahn München
- Connections: 243, 451, 465, 466

Construction
- Parking: yes
- Cycle facilities: yes
- Accessible: yes

Other information
- Station code: 382
- DS100 code: MBDH
- IBNR: 8000785
- Category: 5
- Fare zone: : 1 and 2
- Website: www.bahnhof.de

History
- Opened: 1 May 1897; 129 years ago

Services
| Preceding station | Munich S-Bahn | Following station |
|---|---|---|
| Vaterstetten towards Geltendorf | S4 selected trains only | Zorneding towards Ebersberg |
| Vaterstetten towards Tutzing | S6 | Zorneding towards Ebersberg |
Location
- Location within Bavaria Location within Germany Location within Europe

Baldham station (German: Haltepunkt Baldham) is a railway station in the municipality of Baldham, located in the Ebersberg district in Bavaria, Germany.

The station of Baldham was opened on 1 May 1897. Since 1972, the station has been served only by the S-Bahn. The island platform can be reached via an underpass.
