= Baldham =

District of Vaterstetten, Germany

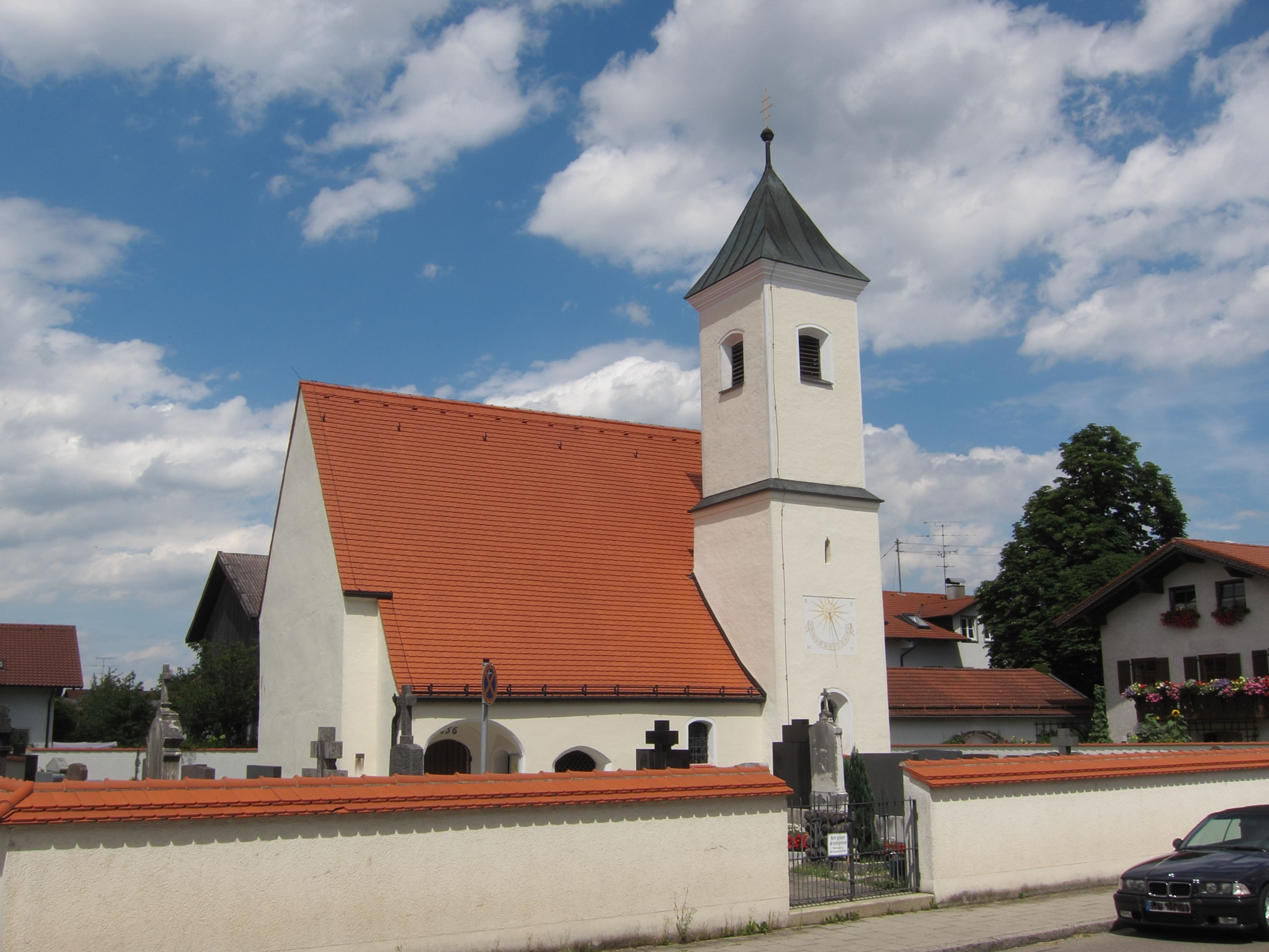
Baldham Village Church

Baldham is a district of Vaterstetten in the Upper Bavarian district of Ebersberg, Germany. It is located approximately 18 km east of the state capital Munich and 15 km west of the district capital Ebersberg.

== Geography ==
Vaterstetten is located in the Munich region at the transition from the Munich gravel plain to the Ebersberg Forest.

== Districts ==
The original part of Baldham is the „Baldham Dorf“ ("Baldham Village"), which has hardly changed until today. It has about 800 inhabitants, most of whom belong to old-established families. Today, the majority of the population lives in the new development area around the Baldham S-Bahn station two kilometres away. The stop contributed greatly to Baldham's rapid population growth. Many people settled there because of the combination of its convenient location near the city of Munich, the garden city character of the town and the comparatively low rents at the time. This large part of Baldham has grown together with Vaterstetten throughout.

== History ==
Today's municipality of Vaterstetten was only created with the municipal reform in 1978, when Vaterstetten together with the current districts of Hergolding, Neufarn, Parsdorf, Purfing, Neubaldham and Weißenfeld formed the municipality of Parsdorf. On May 1, 1978, the Waldkolonie Pöring district was removed from the former municipality of Pöring and the Kolonie Baldham district from the municipality of Zorneding and incorporated into the municipality of Parsdorf. On May 2, 1978, only one day later, the community was renamed from Parsdorf to Vaterstetten, because the main focus of settlement had already developed for a long time in the villages of Vaterstetten and Baldham.
