= Munich–Rosenheim railway =

Double-track main line of the German railways

Munich–Rosenheim
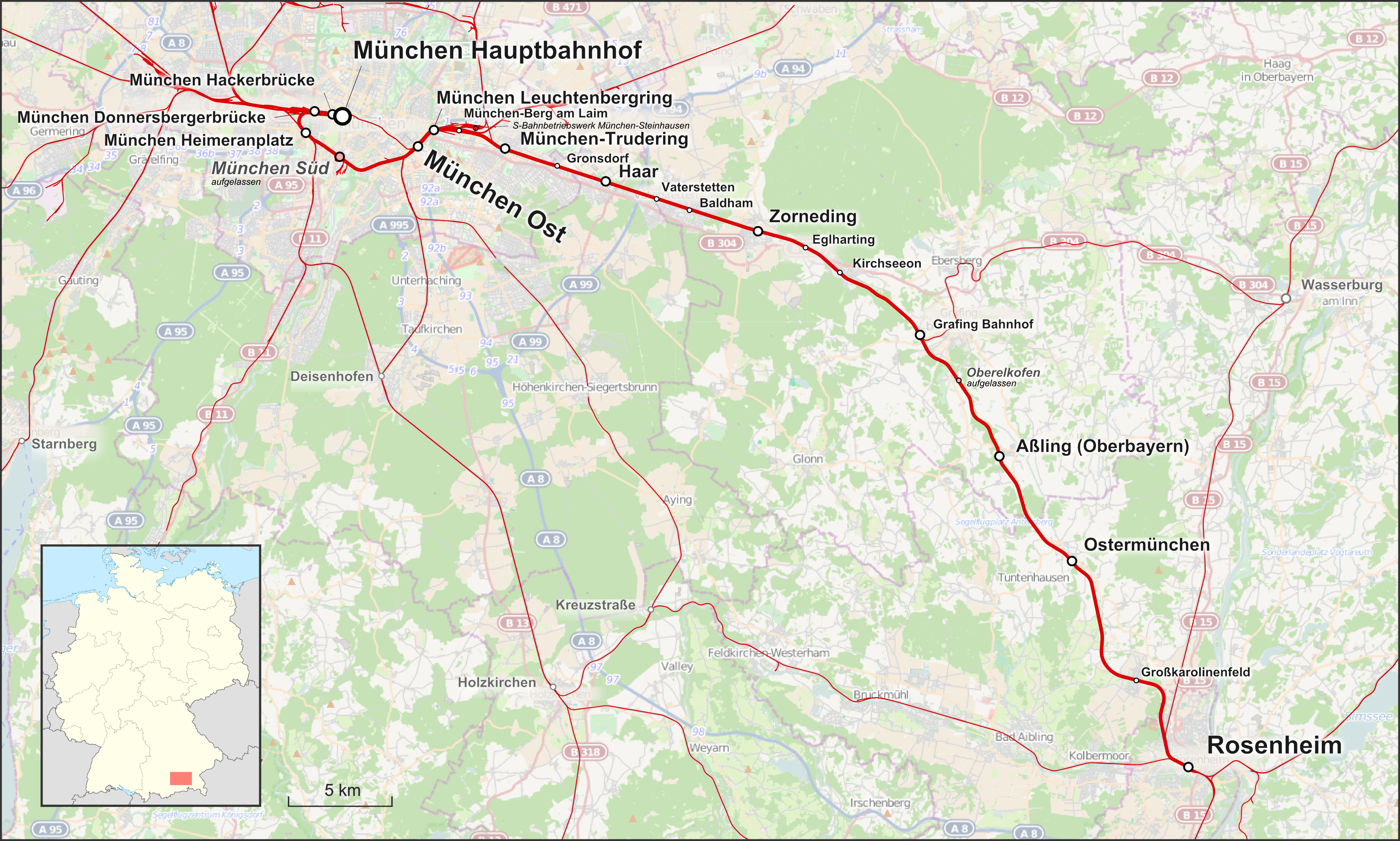

Overview
- Native name: Bahnstrecke München-Rosenheim
- Status: Operational
- Owner: Deutsche Bahn
- Line number: 5510 Munich–Rosenheim; 5555 M-Berg am Laim–Grafing
- Locale: Bavaria, Germany
- Termini: Munich; Rosenheim
- Stations: 20

Service
- Type: Heavy rail, Passenger/freight rail Regional rail, Commuter rail, Intercity rail
- Route number: 950 / 951
- Operator(s): DB Bahn, DB Regio, Munich S-Bahn; Bayerische Oberlandbahn; EuroCity, Austrian Federal Railways

History
- Opened: 15 October 1871

Technical
- Line length: 64.9 km (40.3 mi)
- Number of tracks: Double track
- Track gauge: 1,435 mm (4 ft 8 1/2 in) standard gauge
- Electrification: 15 kV/16.7 Hz AC overhead catenary
- Operating speed: 160 km/h (99 mph)

The Munich–Rosenheim railway is a 65 kilometre-long double-track main line of the German railways. It connects Munich Hauptbahnhof with Rosenheim station, where it connects with the Rosenheim–Salzburg railway, which connects with the line to Vienna at Salzburg, and the line to Kufstein, which continues to Innsbruck and the Brenner line to Italy. The line is part of the "Main line for Europe", connecting Paris with Bratislava and Budapest and the almost identical line 17 of Trans-European Transport Networks (TEN-T). It is part of the line 1 of TEN-T. It is electrified at 15 kV, 16.7 Hz. It was opened between Munich and Rosenheim in 1871.

== History ==
Already in the 1860s, it was clear that the Mangfall Valley Railway (Mangfalltalbahn), which had been opened between 1854 and 1857, could no longer absorb the increase in traffic on the main lines towards Austria. Duplication of the Mangfall Valley Railway was not an option due to its twisty and hilly route. In addition, a new line via Grafing would be ten kilometres shorter than the Mangfall Valley Railway and it would also mean that locomotives would avoid wheel-slip because the slope was significantly more gradual. On 16 May 1868, it was decided to build a single-track line from Munich to Rosenheim via Grafing. The government of Bavaria provided four million guilders for the construction. The railway line was opened on 15 October 1871. All trains now used the line through Grafing instead of the Mangfall Valley Railway, shortening travel time considerably. As a result of the numerous services established on the line shortly after its opening, it became a major international route for European long-distance services.

It was decided to duplicate the line on 29 December 1891. At the same time additional tracks would be built in Munich East, Zorneding, Grafing, Ostermünchen and Rosenheim stations. Simple passing tracks were planned in Zorneding and Ostermünchen. The track layout would be rebuilt in Munich East, Grafing and Rosenheim. The duplication was started at the beginning of 1892. The second track between Munich East and München Trudering station was taken into operations on 1 October 1892. The second track was completed from Munich to Zorneding on 5 October. The second track was opened between Zorneding and Kirchseeon on 1 May 1893. The second track was opened between Kirchseeon and Aßling on 1 October 1893. Duplication of the last section from Aßling to Rosenheim was completed on 1 May 1894. The duplication cost a total of 2,778,400 marks, of which 92,300 marks was spent on the purchase of land. It cost 50,600 marks per kilometres.

The traffic on the line continued to increase so that around 50 trains ran daily between Munich and Rosenheim. During the First World War, traffic on the line was severely limited. Many trains were cancelled due to the coal shortage. Slower military trains meant that travel time of trains had to be extended. In 1917, only two pairs of expresses ran on the line, the others were cancelled due to lack of personnel, rolling stock, locomotives and coal. It was not until the 1920s that the number of trains returned to the level achieved before the First World War. In 1921, an office for managing new construction was established by Deutsche Reichsbahn in Rosenheim for the electrification of the line from Munich to Rosenheim, Rosenheim to Kufstein and Rosenheim to Salzburg. The plans were delayed, however, due to the poor finances of Deutsche Reichsbahn. In 1925, electrification began on the lines from Munich to Rosenheim and from Rosenheim to Salzburg. The construction work was very slow due to lack of money. The line from Munich-Rosenheim was finally operable by electric trains from 12 April 1927. 20 express trains, 12 semi-fast (Eilzug) and stopping trains and 22 freight trains ran on the line in 1927. The section from Munich to Grafing was also served by 28 local passenger trains daily. In Rosenheim an electrical sub-station was completed in 1928 to supply the increasing need for power for the electric locomotives.

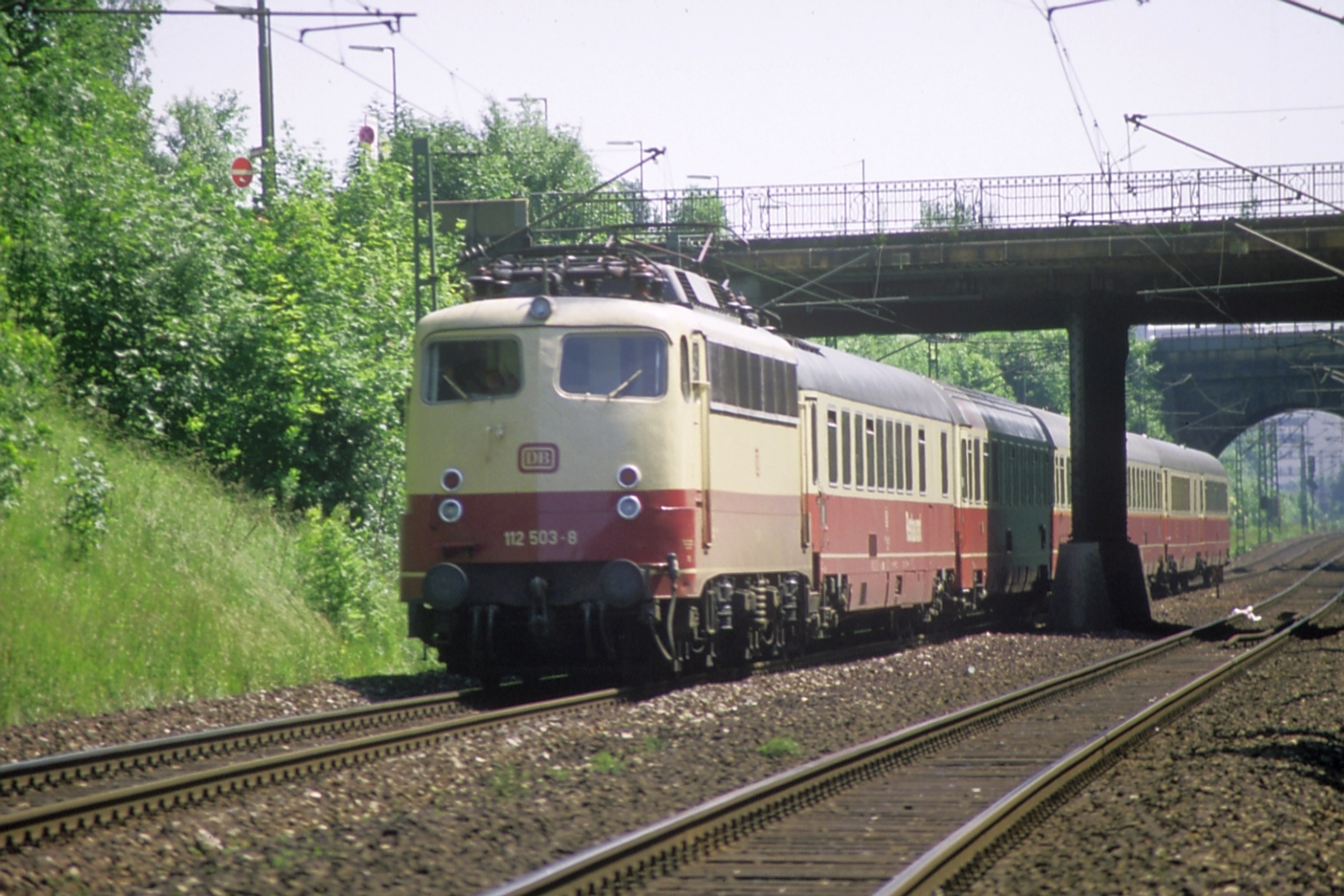
TEE Rheingold, pulled by a class 112 locomotive on the Munich South Ring in 1986

In World War II, passenger services were again greatly reduced. The line was used for many military transports towards Eastern Europe and a delousing and "rehabilitation" facility was built in Rosenheim. After the end of World War II, the track had to be rebuilt quickly as an important supply line. The first train ran on 18 May 1945 for the United States Army. On 16 July 1945, a railway crash occurred at Aßling due to an error by a dispatcher in which a freight train carrying American tanks ran into a broken down passenger train carrying German prisoners of war and between 102 and 110 people were killed. In the early 1950s, passenger traffic increased strongly and the line became an important link for migrant workers from Eastern Europe in the late 1950s. In 1991, regular interval services were introduced so that commuter trains ran hourly between Munich and Salzburg. Long-distance trains run every hour alternately towards Salzburg and Kufstein. Between 1972 and 1991 and since 2004, the section from Munich East to Grafing has been operated as line 4 of the Munich S-Bahn, although from 1991 to 2004, it was operated as line S5. Since the 1990s, the section to Haar or Zorneding or Grafing station has been reinforced in the peak hour by an additional S-Bahn service, currently (since 2009) by line S6.

Operation of regional services on the Munich-Rosenheim line was put to tender as part of the E-Netzes Rosenheim (Rosenheim electric network). The contract was awarded to Veolia Verkehr, now part of Transdev Germany. Since 2013, it has operated an hourly regional service from Munich to Salzburg under the Meridian brand. This runs as an express service from Munich East to Rosenheim. In addition, an hourly regional service runs from Munich to Kufstein, which serves all intermediate stops.

== Route ==
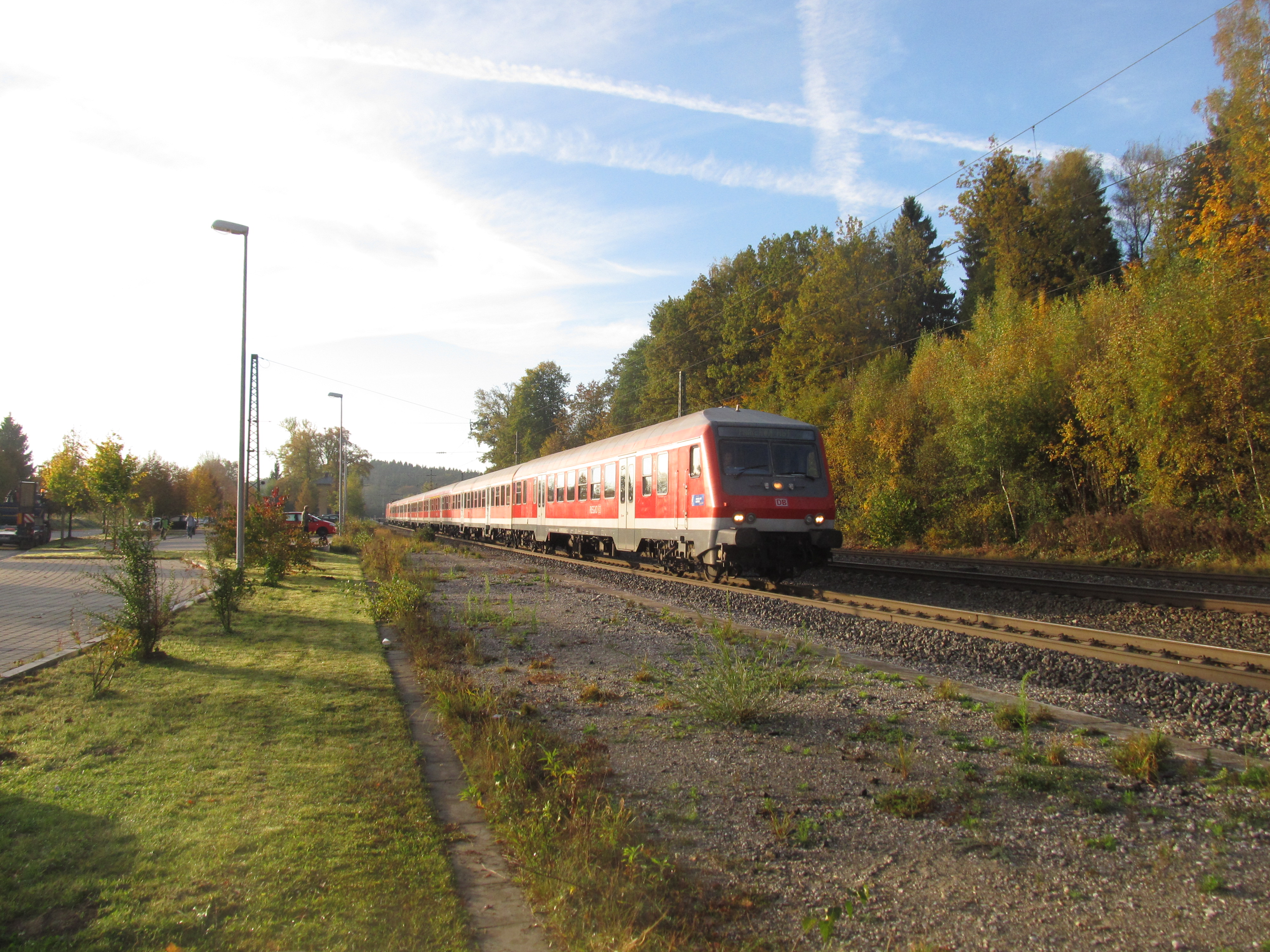
Regional-Express near Aßling

The line runs from Munich Central Station (Hauptbahnhof) on the Munich South Ring to Munich East station (München Ostbahnhof). Next, the railway line runs to the east to München-Berg am Laim station where the Munich–Mühldorf railway branches off. Shortly before Trudering a single-track line running from the Munich East–Munich Airport railway connects with the Munich–Rosenheim line. This connection is used only by freight trains bypassing Munich over the Munich North Ring. München Trudering station provides a connection with line 2 of the Munich U-Bahn towards Messestadt-Ost.

Between München Ost and Grafing the line runs next to the tracks of S-Bahn line 999.4 (S 4), which continues to Ebersberg on the Grafing–Wasserburg line. An abandoned line to Glonn branches off at Grafing.

At Rosenheim, the Munich–Kufstein line branches off towards Innsbruck and the Brenner line to Italy, while the Munich–Salzburg line continues to Salzburg. The two lines are connected east of the Rosenheim station by a single-track electrified bypass line (the Rosenheim Curve) which allows trains connecting Salzburg and Kufstein to avoid reversal in Rosenheim. This route is used mainly by Austrian domestic train services to run through without stopping in Germany. Rosenheim station is also served by services on the Rosenheim–Mühldorf railway (Rosenheim–Mühldorf; timetable route 944) and the Mangfall Valley Railway (Rosenheim−Holzkirchen; 958).

== Stations ==
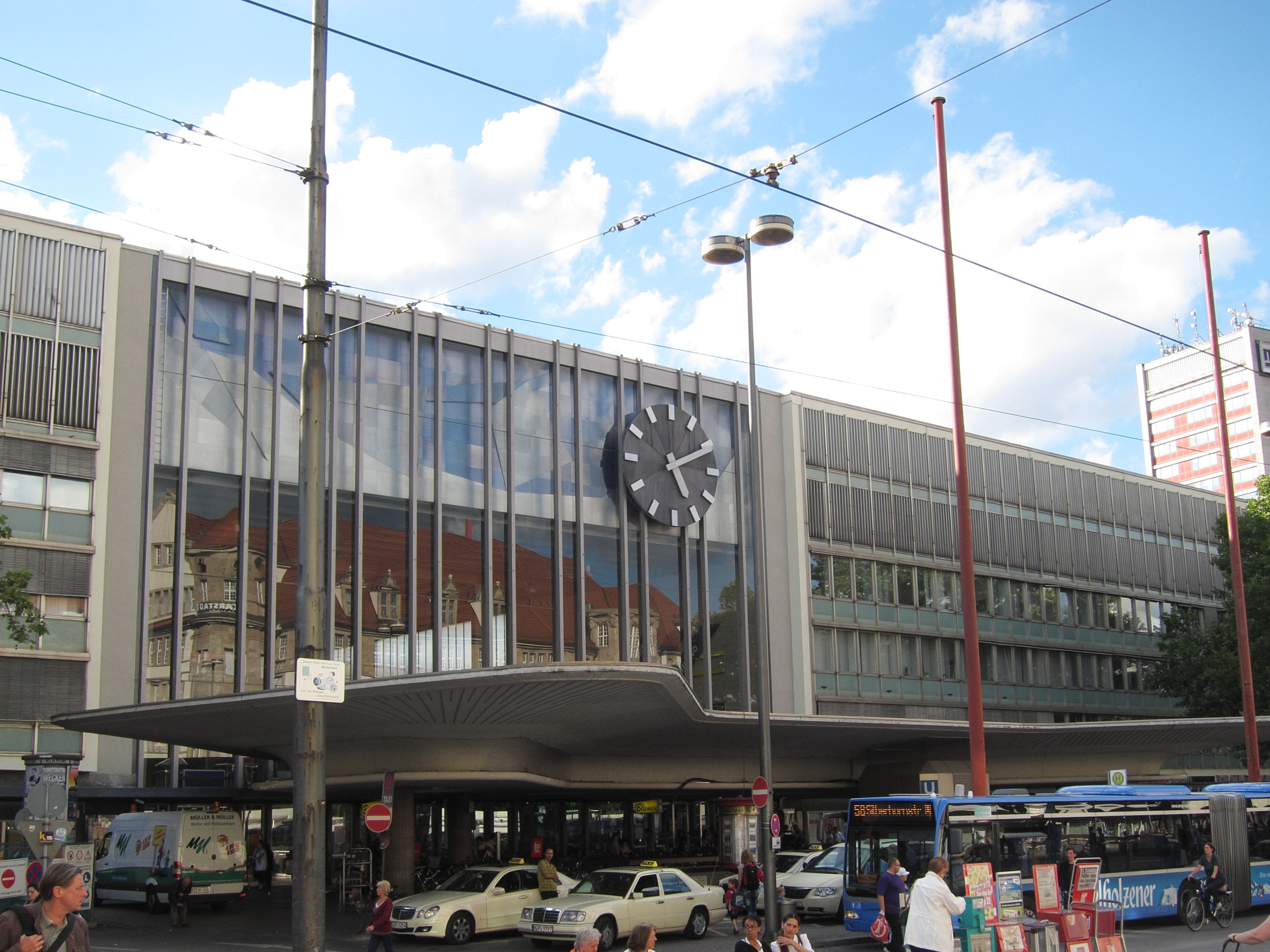
Munich Hauptbahnhof

=== Munich Hauptbahnhof ===
München Hauptbahnhof (Munich main station), which was opened in 1839, is the largest station in the city of Munich and forms the starting point of the Munich–Rosenheim railway. The station was provisionally put into operation at its present location in 1848, but it has been rebuilt several times since. The current entrance building was opened on 1 August 1960, after the previous one had been destroyed in the Second World War. The underground station for S-Bahn services was built with the main line of the S-Bahn in 1972.

=== Munich South ===
Munich South station (Bahnhof München Süd) was opened on 15 March 1871 as Thalkirchen station and was renamed Munich South in 1876. From 1891, the Isar Valley Railway (Isartalbahn) branched off in Munich South, but no passenger trains ran on the section between Munich South and München Isartalbahnhof (the Munich terminus of the Isar Valley Railway). A connecting curve was established from Munich South to Munich-Pasing in 1893. The station had an important freight yard from its opening, but, after the opening of the München-Laim marshalling yard, it lost its importance for long-distance freight trains. Passenger operations ended eight years after the opening of the nearby Poccistraße U-Bahn station on 1 June 1985.

=== Munich East ===
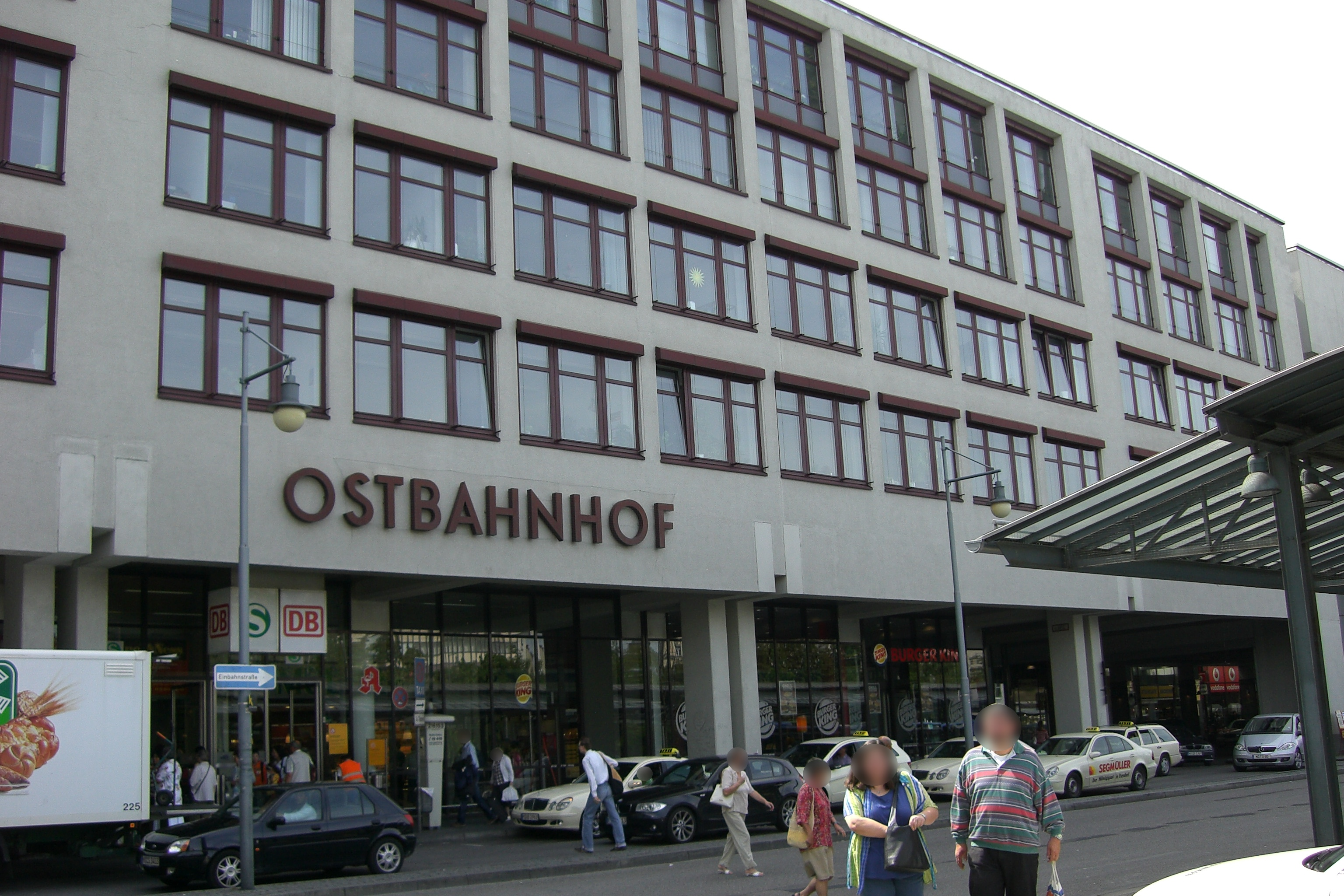
Entrance building of Munich East station

Munich East station (Bahnhof München Ost) was opened on 15 March 1871 as München-Haidhausen station. The Munich East–Deisenhofen railway, opened in 1898, and the line to Ismaning, opened in 1909, branch from the Munich–Rosenheim line in the station. The current station building was opened in 1985 after the original building, built in 1871, was destroyed in World War II.

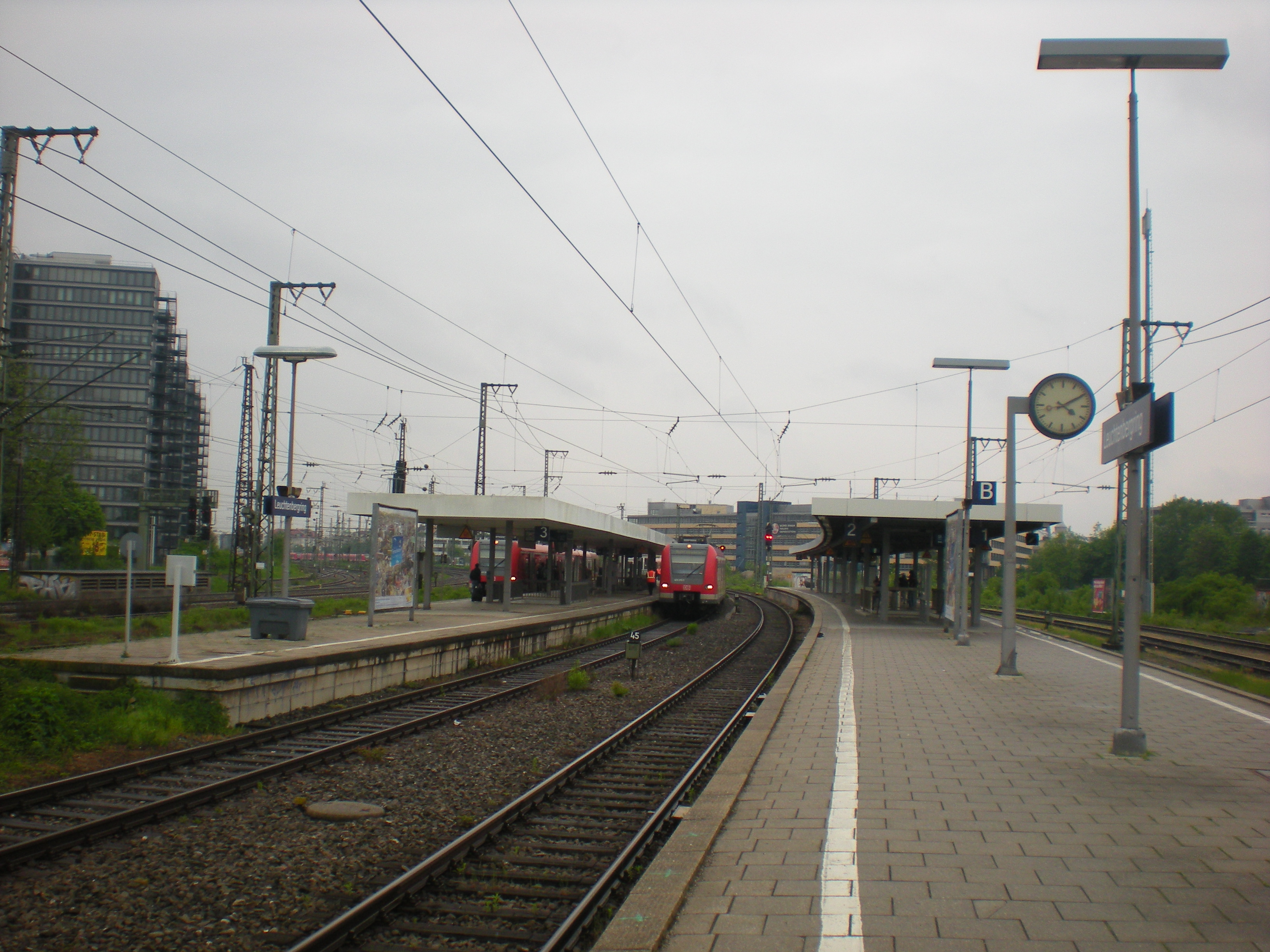
Munich Leuchtenbergring platforms

=== Munich Leuchtenbergring station ===
Munich Leuchtenbergring station (Bahnhof München Leuchtenbergring) was opened on 28 May 1972 with the commissioning of the Munich S-Bahn network. Since the beginning of the 1990s, the station has had four rather than two platform tracks, but only the outer two are used for S-Bahn operations as the two internal tracks are used for connecting the München-Steinhausen D-Bahn rolling stock workshop (Bahnbetriebswerk) to Munich East station. The station is administered as part of Munich East station.

=== Munich-Berg am Laim ===
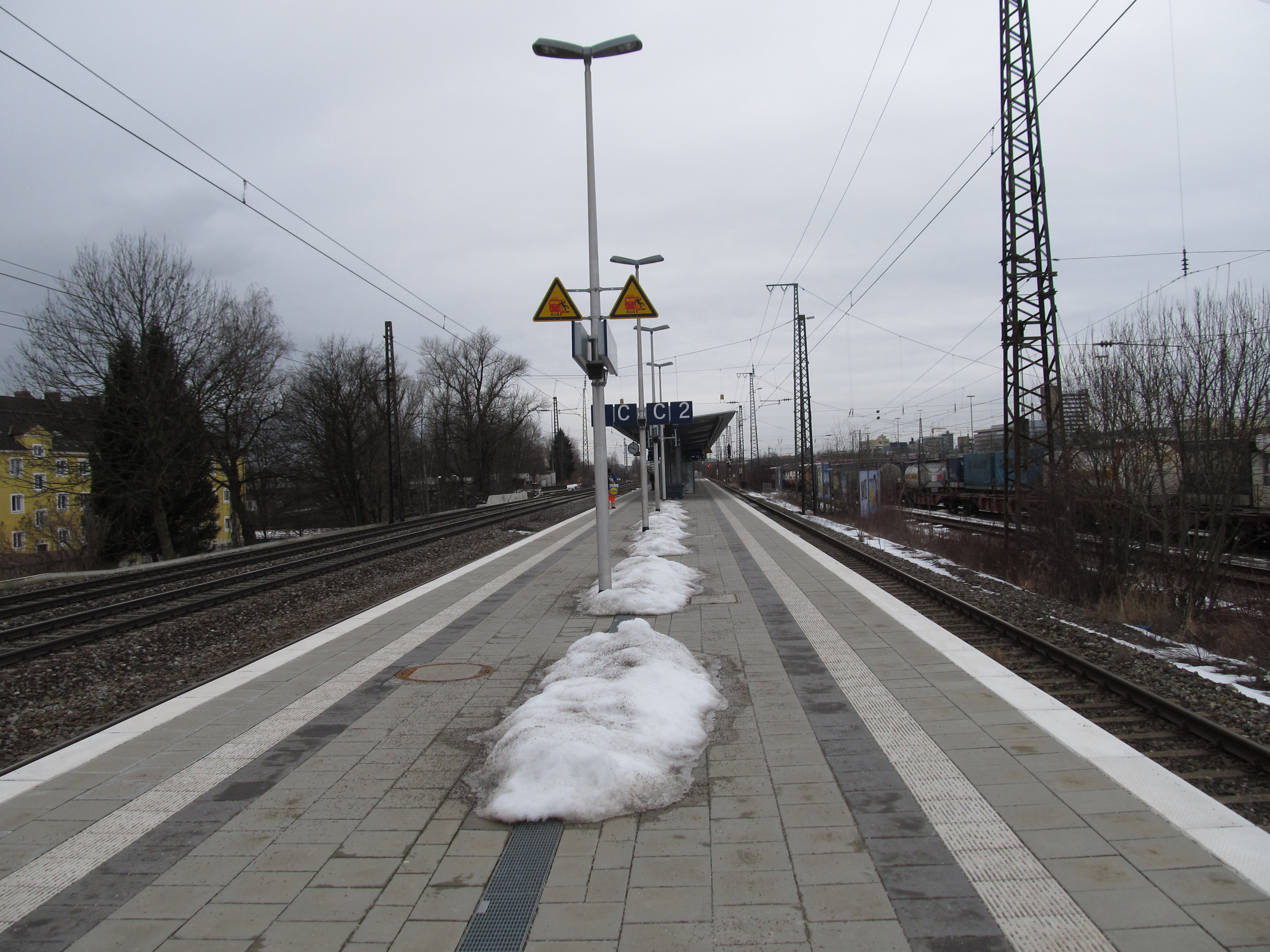
Platforms of Munich-Berg am Laim

The halt of Berg am Laim (Haltepunkt Berg am Laim) was opened on 1 May 1897, but it was closed on 1 May 1915. A year later, on 1 May 1916, a new Berg am Laim halt was opened which was only accessible from the Munich–Mühldorf railway. The station was not accessible from the Munich–Rosenheim railway until the commissioning of the Munich S-Bahn network in 1972. It is now only served by S-Bahn services.

It now has two platform tracks. The Munich–Mühldorf railway branches off the Munich–Rosenheim railway at this station.

=== Munich Trudering station ===
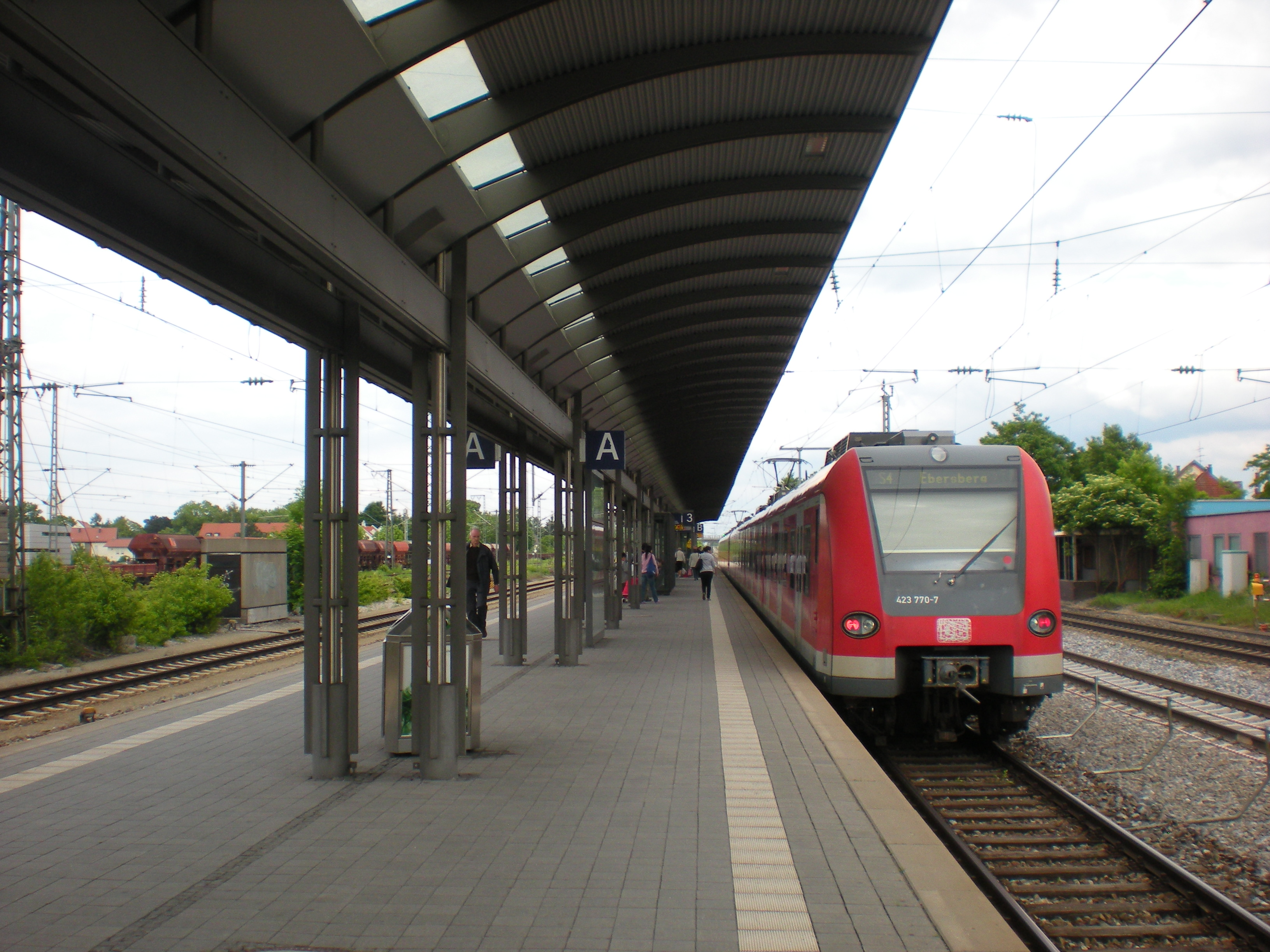
S-Bahn platforms in Munich Trudering

The station was opened on 15 October 1871 with the Munich–Rosenheim railway. Since 1972, the station has been served only by the S-Bahn. The Trudering U-Bahn station was opened in 1999. In addition, the Munich North Ring joins the line at Trudering station. Next to the station there are storage sidings for freight and S-Bahn trains.

=== Gronsdorf ===
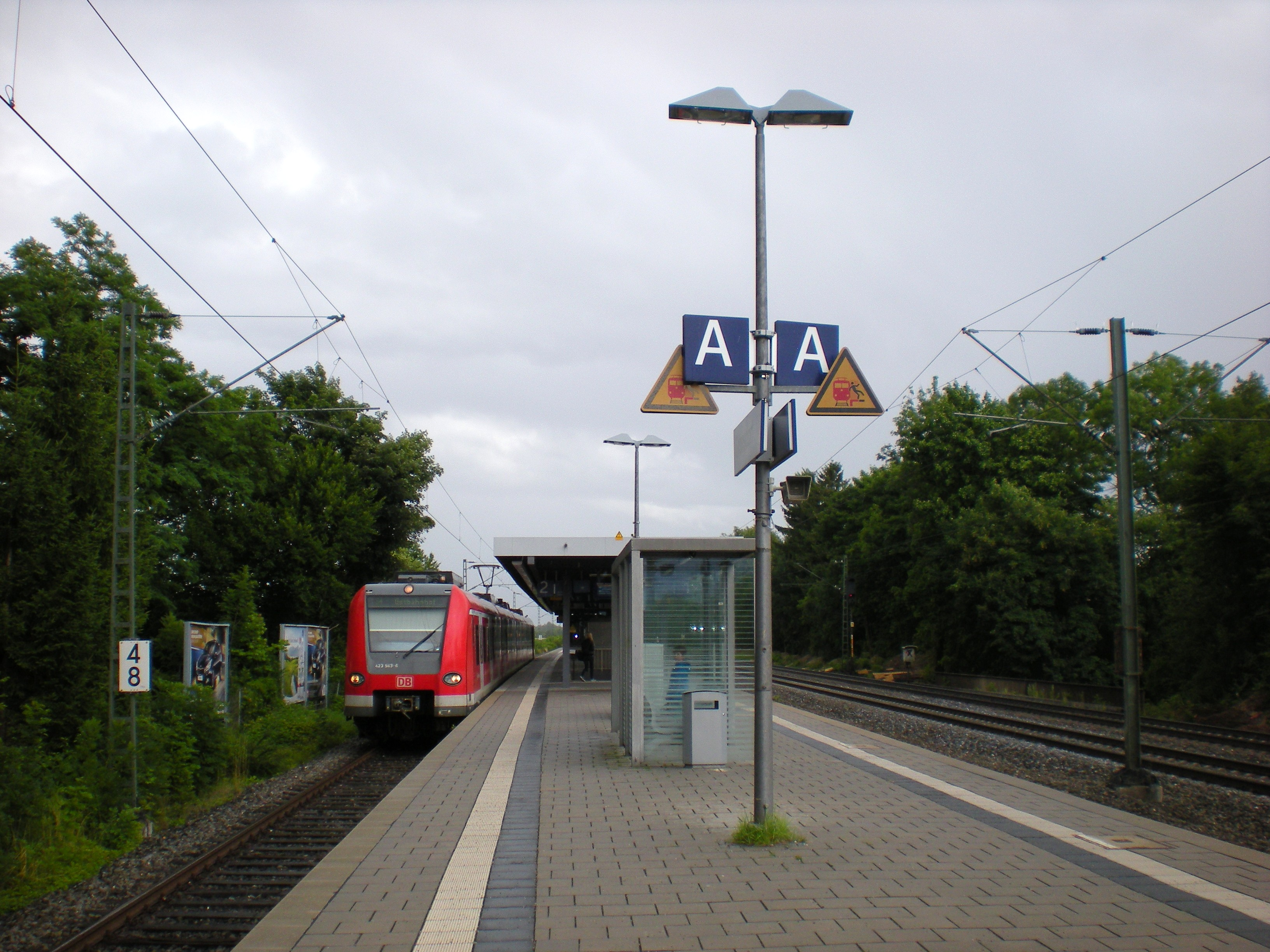
Platform of Gronsdorf station

The halt of Gronsdorf, which is located on the boundary between Munich and the municipality of Haar, was opened on 1 May 1897. It is located between the Munich district of Waldtrudering and the Haar settlement of Gronsdorf, after which it is named. The station has an island platform accessible by a pedestrian underpass. Gronsdorf has been served only by the S-Bahn since 1972.

=== Haar ===
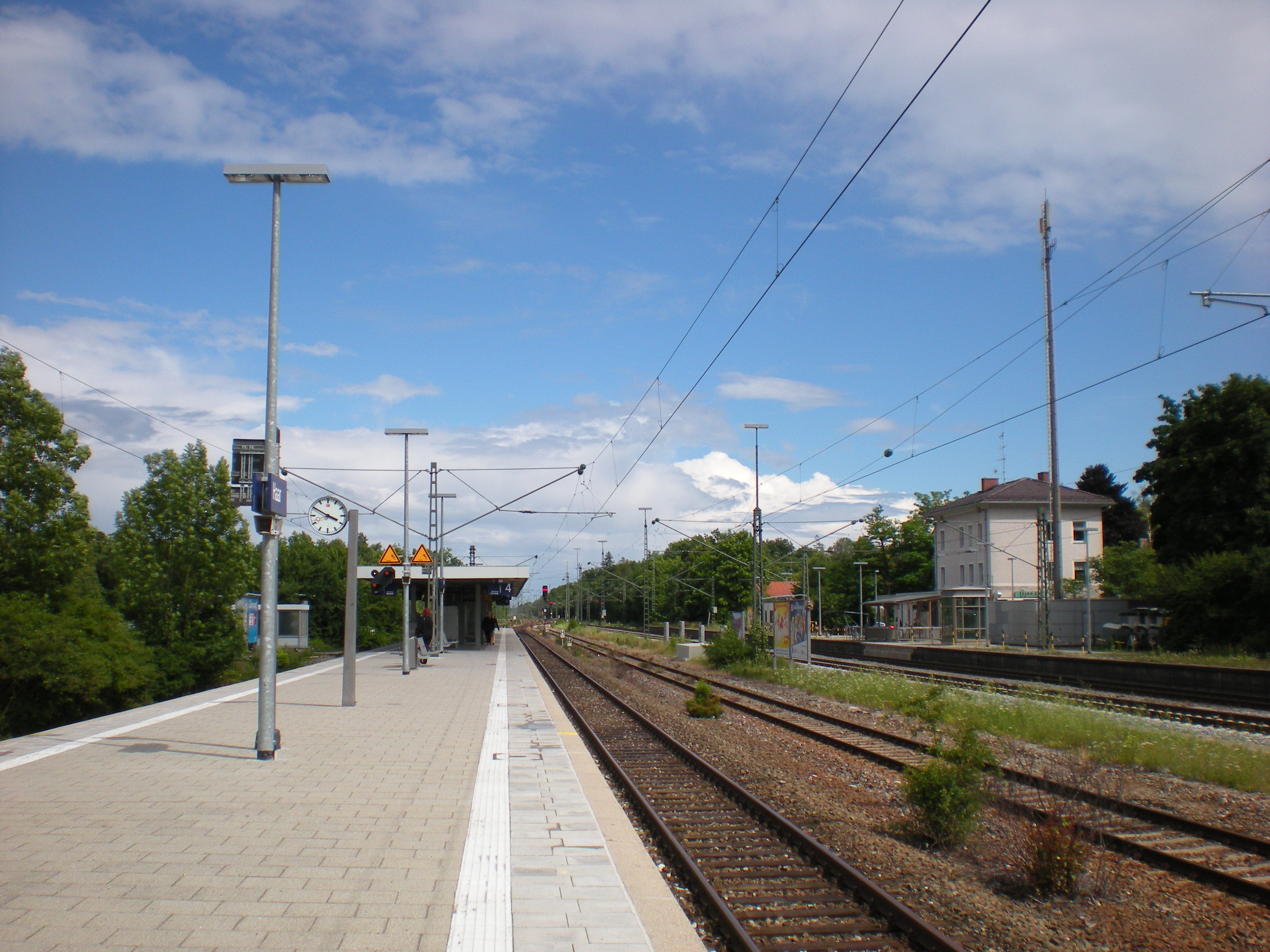
S-Bahn platform and the entrance building of Haar station

Haar station was opened on 15 October 1871. The station has an entrance building and an adjacent "house" platform, which is no longer used. It is still preserved because regional trains stopped in Haar until the 1990s. The S-Bahn platform is accessible via an underpass from the entrance building. Another island platform, which used to be located between the two main tracks, has been demolished. The station is now served by the S-Bahn only.

=== Vaterstetten ===
The halt of Vaterstetten was opened on 1 May 1897. Today, the station is served only by the S-Bahn. The island platform can be reached via an underpass.

=== Baldham ===
The station of Baldham was also opened on 1 May 1897. Since 1972, the station has been served only by the S-Bahn. The island platform can be reached via an underpass.

=== Zorneding ===
The station of Zorneding was opened with the line on 15 October 1871. The station continued to be also served by regional services until a few years after the commissioning of the S-Bahn network. The original entrance building was demolished in early 2009. Today some S-Bahn line 6 services terminate in Zorneding during the peak; a siding has been provided for this purpose. The island platform is accessible by an underpass.

=== Eglharting ===
The halt of Eglharting was opened on 1 May 1897. It has an island platform accessible by an underpass. Since 1972, it has been served only by the S-Bahn.

=== Kirchseeon ===
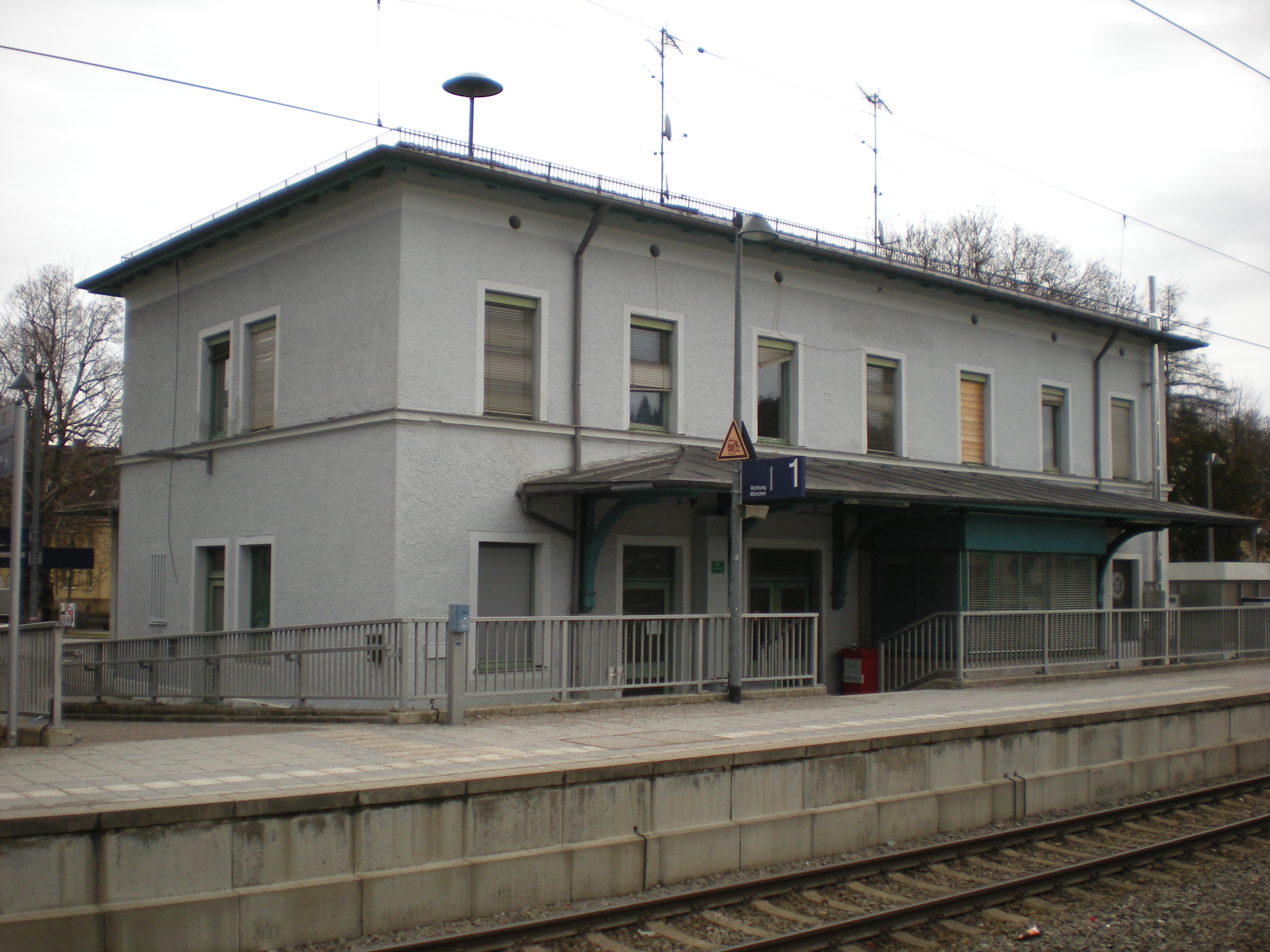
Entrance building of Kirchseeon station

Kirchseeon station was opened on 15 October 1871 with the railway. From 1890, a forestry railway temporarily ran into Kirchseeon from the Ebersberger Forst (Ebersberg forest), which served to remove timber that had died as a result of an attack by black arches butterflies. The station still has an entrance building. Today, the station is only served by the S-Bahn and has a "house" platform and a side platform. The side platform is accessible via an underpass. The station has an overtaking track for long-distance trains. Until the upgrade for the S-Bahn in the 1970s, there was a siding to a warehouse and a sawmill to the northeast of the station; the southern siding to the former sleeper factory and later FIAT/IVECO car/truck depot and a northern siding to the Raiffeisen warehouse were detached and partially upgraded during the construction of separate S-Bahn tracks in the mid-1990s.

=== Grafing station ===
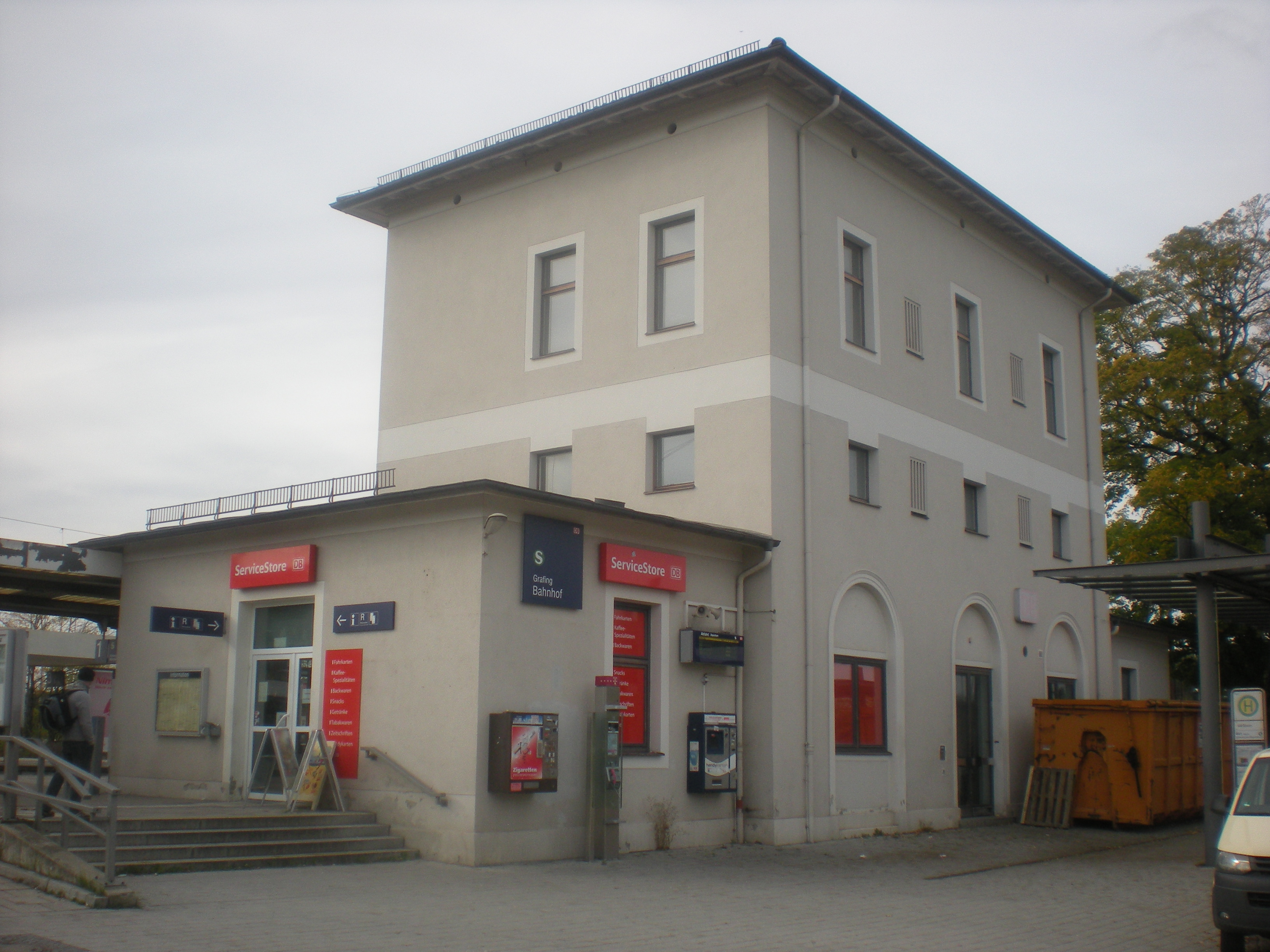
Entrance building of Grafing Bahnhof

The station of Grafing (Grafing Bahnhof) was opened outside the town of Grafing with the line on 15 October 1871. The former line to Glonn branched off in Grafing from 26 May 1894 until 1971. The branch line to Wasserburg was opened on 6 November 1899. The station is served by S-Bahn lines 4 and 6, which continue to Ebersberg, and by regional trains. Thus, the station acts as an interchange between the S-Bahn, the Filzen-Express to Wasserburg and the regional trains on the Munich–Rosenheim railway. The station has six platform tracks connected by an underpass. The entrance building has been preserved to this day.

=== Aßling (Oberbay) ===
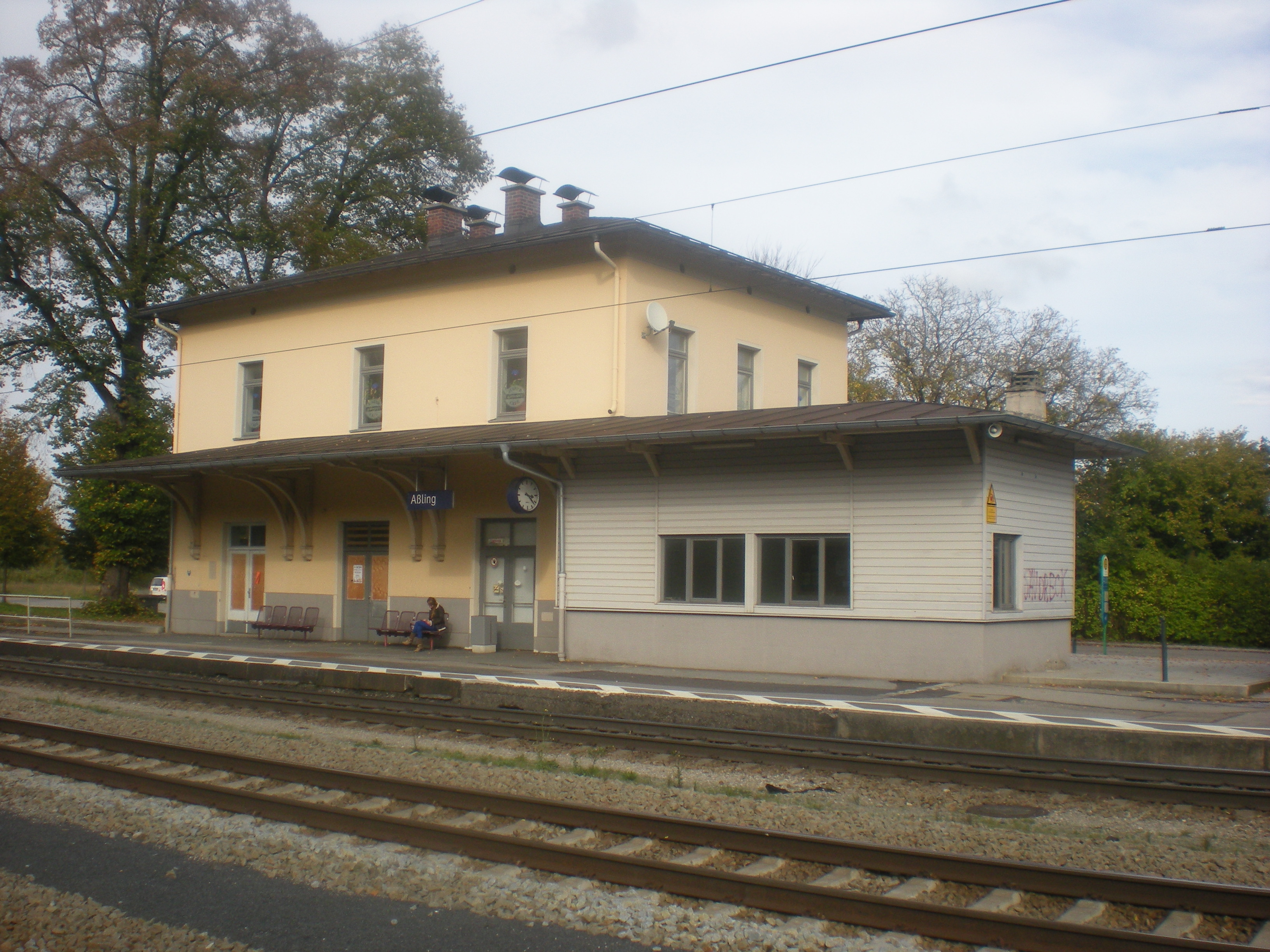
Aßling entrance building

Aßling (Oberbay) station was opened on 15 October 1871 with the line. It has three tracks, but only two platform tracks as the third track serves as a passing track. The entrance building is still preserved and is located next to the main platform. The opposite side platform is connected by an underpass to the main platform. The Aßling railway disaster, which killed at least 102 people, occurred on 16 July 1945 near the station.

=== Ostermünchen ===
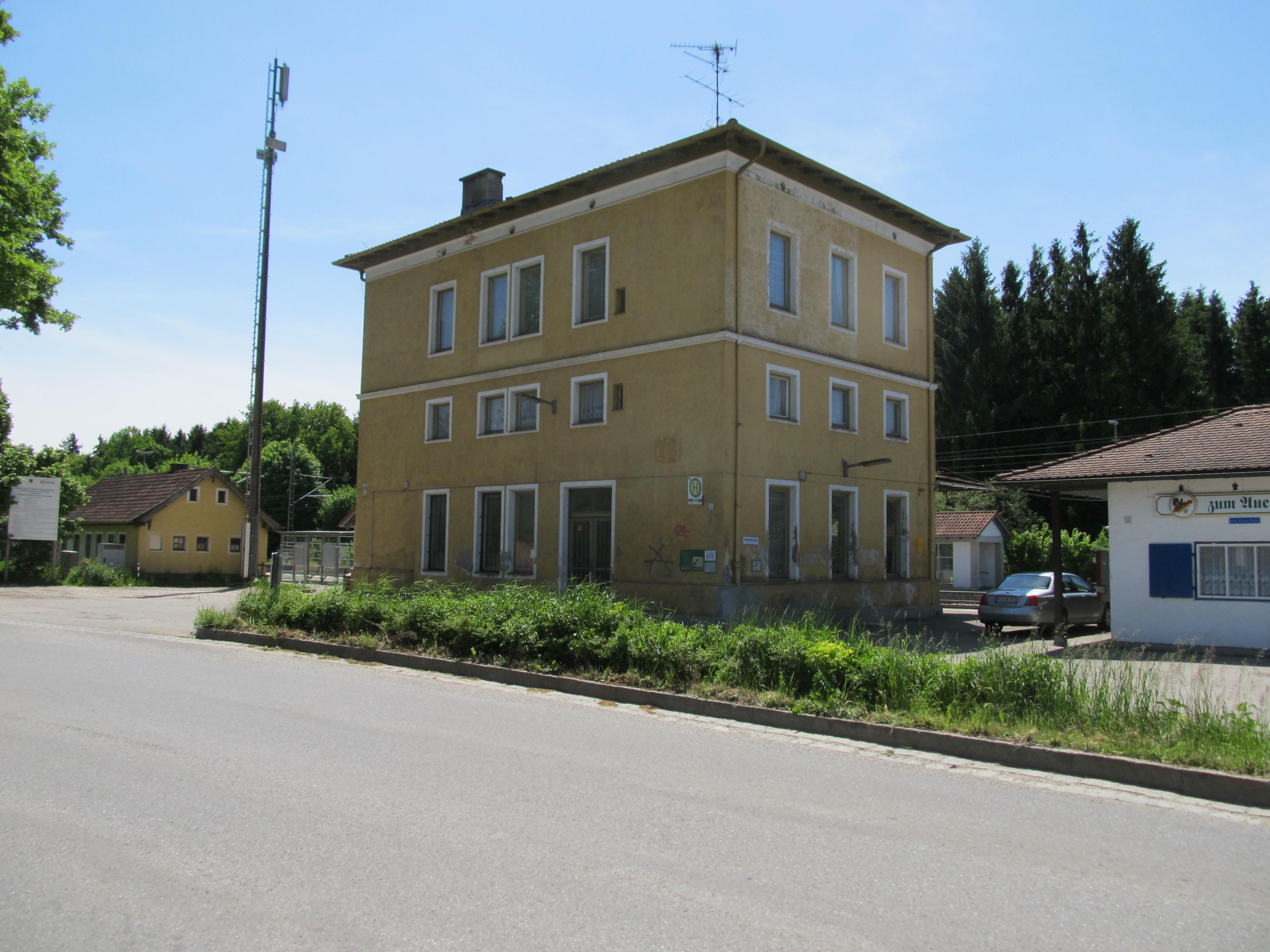
Ostermünchen station

Ostermünchen station was opened on 15 October 1871 with the Munich–Rosenheim railway. It has three tracks, but only two platform tracks as the third track serves as a passing track. The entrance building is still preserved and is located on the main platform. The opposite outside platform is connected by an underpass to the main platform.

=== Großkarolinenfeld ===
The halt of Großkarolinenfeld was opened on 15 October 1871 with the Munich–Rosenheim railway. It has two tracks, which are located next to two side platforms, which are connected by an underpass.

=== Rosenheim ===
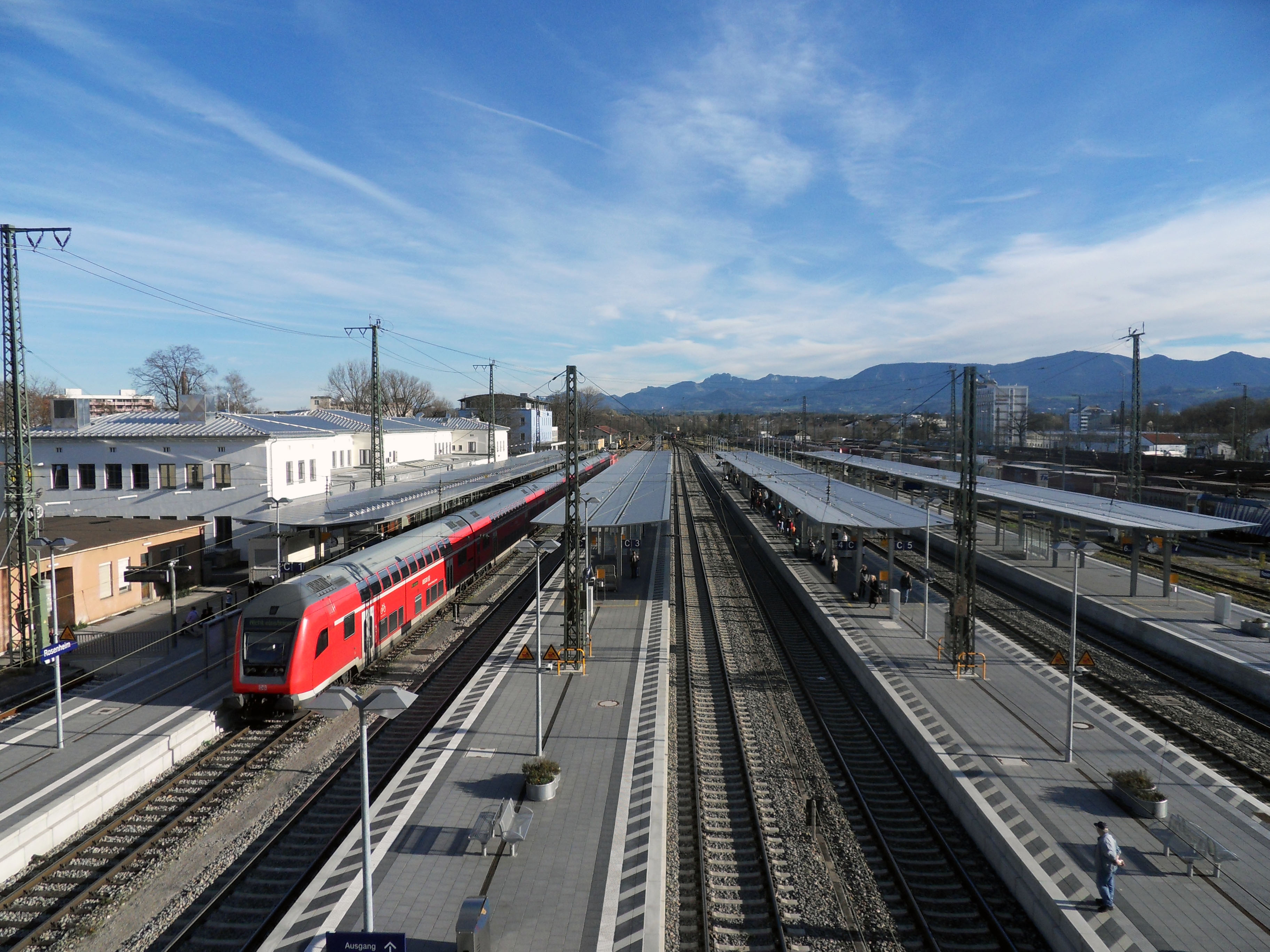
Platforms of Rosenheim station

The station was opened on 24 October 1857 with the Mangfall Valley Railway as a provisional station. Because of some delays, the permanent station was not opened until 13 November 1858. Due to a lack of space, the old station was closed and a new one was opened west of the old station on 19 April 1876. The Rosenheim locomotive depot (Bahnbetriebswerk) was also significant for the line.

Today, the station is the seventh largest station in Bavaria with about 20,000 passengers each day. It is used by about 150 regional and long-distance passenger services each day.

== Current operations ==
Passenger and freight trains operate on the Munich-Rosenheim railway line.

=== Regional passenger services ===
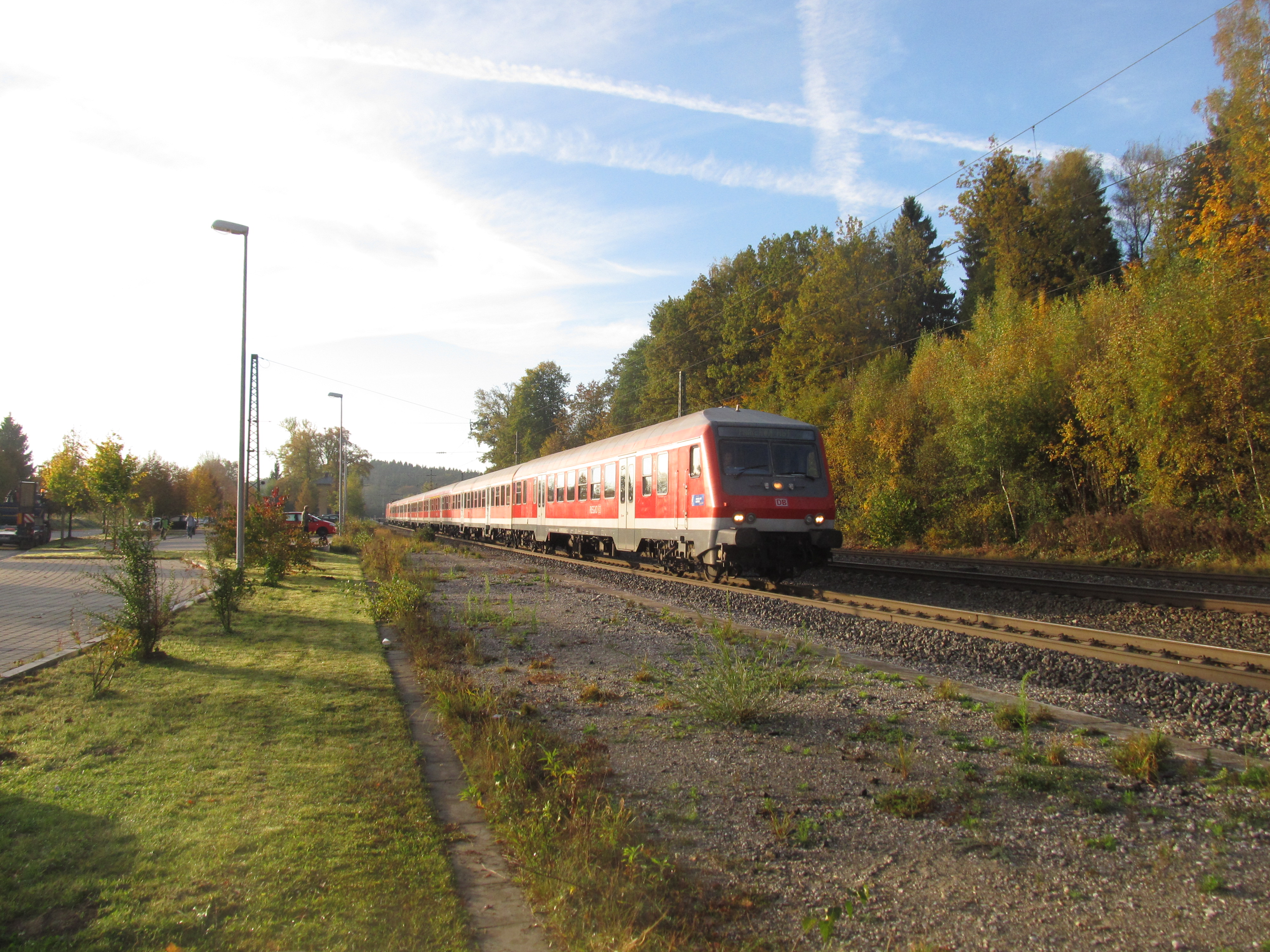
Regional-Express near Aßling

An hourly Regional-Express service formerly operated between Munich and Salzburg as the München-Salzburg-Express. Outside the peak hour, this stopped only at Munich Hauptbahnhof, Munich East, Grafing, Aßling, Ostermünchen, Großkarolinenfeld and Rosenheim. The train was operated until December 2013 with a locomotive of class 111 and with double-deck carriages or Silberling coaches. During the peak hour, some trains stopped only at Munich Hauptbahnhof, Munich East, Grafing and Rosenheim. In the peak, additional services ran as Regionalbahn services between Munich, Rosenheim and Kufstein and were operated with electric multiple units of class 425 or with Silberling coaches, hauled by class 111 electric locomotives. In addition, the section from Grafing to Munich was served in the peak by Filzenexpress services extended to/from Munich. The section from Munich to Grafing is served by line 6 of the Munich S-Bahn, which serves all stops at 20-minute intervals.

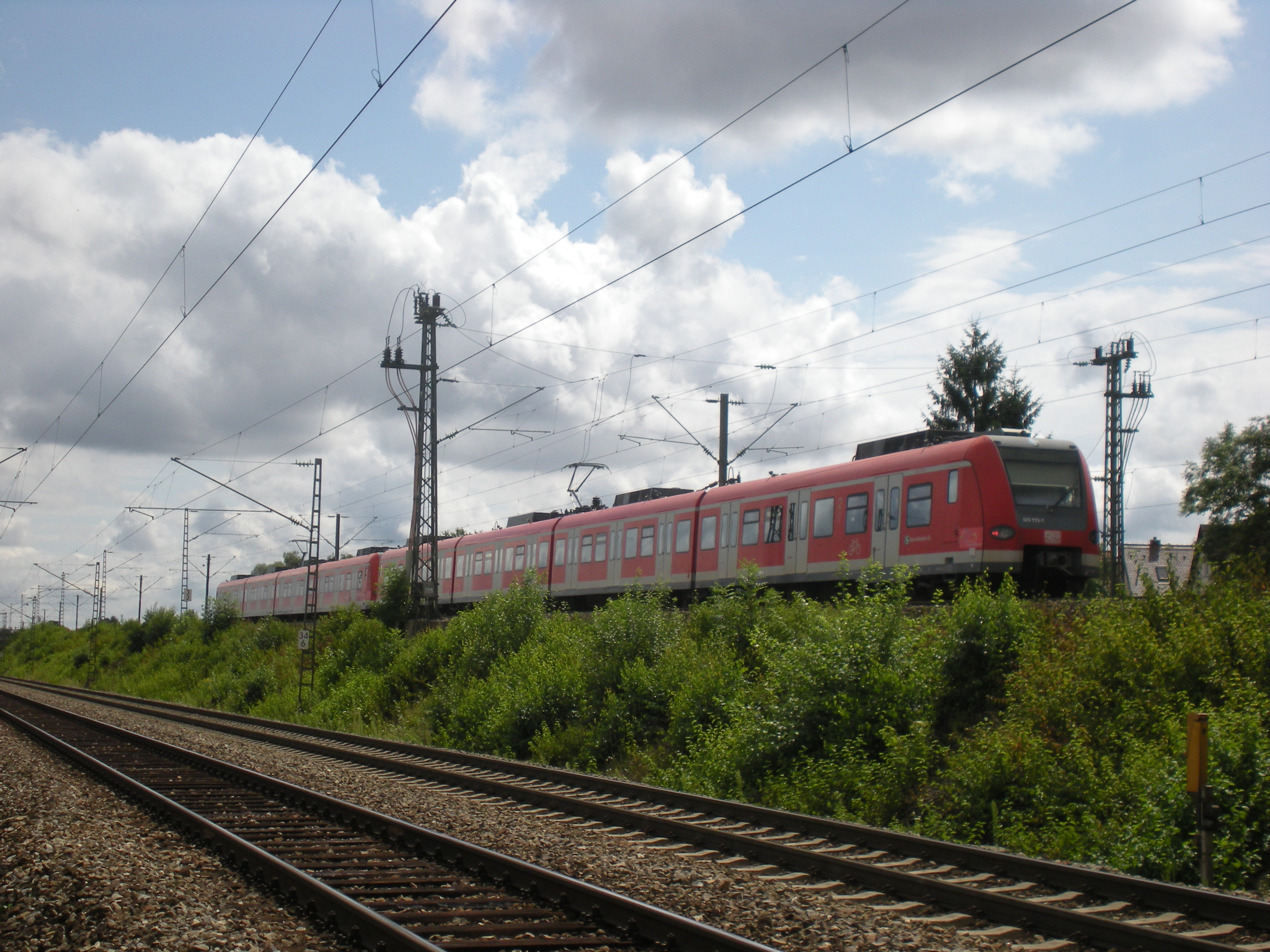
S4 between Trudering and Gronsdorf

Bayerische Oberlandbahn has operated the services of the E-Netz Rosenheim, which includes the Munich–Salzburg, Munich–Kufstein and Munich–Holzkirchen–Rosenheim routes, under the brand name of Meridian since 15 December 2013. The traffic was intended to be operated with new Stadler FLIRT 3 sets from the start. Due to technical defects and lack of safety approvals until May 2014, the old trains were partly replaced by Silberling coaches of Deutsche Bahn, double-deck cars of Metronom and CityShuttle (push–pull) sets of the Austrian Federal Railways. The hourly trains from Salzburg run during the day between Rosenheim and Munich East without stopping. A following train runs from Kufstein to Munich Hauptbahnhof serves all stations between Rosenheim and Grafing.

| Line | Route | Interval |
|---|---|---|
| M | Munich – Rosenheim – Traunstein – Freilassing – Salzburg | Hourly |
| M | Munich – Grafing – Rosenheim – Kufstein | Hourly |
| RB | Munich – Grafing – Ebersberg – Wasserburg | individual services in the peak |
| S4 | Geltendorf – Türkenfeld – Grafrath – Schöngeising – Buchenau – Fürstenfeldbruck – Eichenau – Puchheim – Aubing – Leienfelsstraße – Pasing – Laim – Hirschgarten – Donnersbergerbrücke – Hackerbrücke – Hauptbahnhof – Karlsplatz (Stachus) – Marienplatz – Isartor – Rosenheimer Platz – Munich East – Leuchtenbergring – Berg am Laim – Trudering – Gronsdorf – Haar – Vaterstetten – Baldham station – Zorneding – Eglharting – Kirchseeon – Grafing – Grafing Stadt – Ebersberg | Every 20 minutes in the peak |
| S6 | Tutzing – Feldafing – Possenhofen – Starnberg – Starnberg Nord – Gauting – Stockdorf – Planegg – Gräfelfing – Lochham – Westkreuz – Pasing – Laim – Hirschgarten – Donnersbergerbrücke – Hackerbrücke – Hauptbahnhof – Karlsplatz (Stachus) – Marienplatz – Isartor – Rosenheimer Platz – Munich East – Leuchtenbergring – Berg am Laim – Trudering – Gronsdorf – Haar – Vaterstetten – Baldham station – Zorneding – Eglharting – Kirchseeon – Grafing – Grafing Stadt – Ebersberg | Every 20 minutes |

=== Long distance passenger services ===
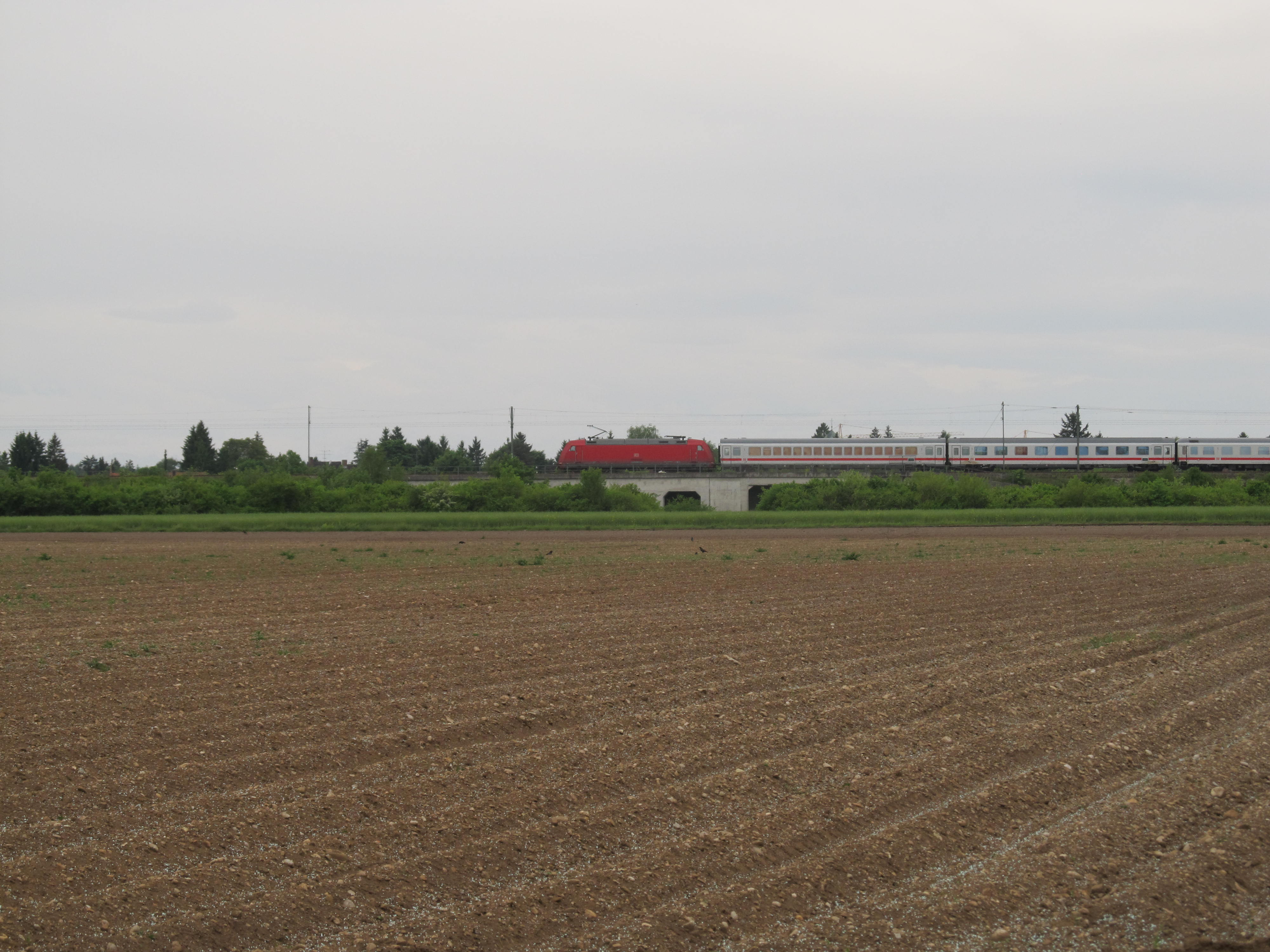
IC service towards Munich, near Trudering

Eurocity (EC) services on the Frankfurt am Main–Salzburg route connect Munich Hauptbahnhof with Salzburg every two hours with stops in Munich East, Rosenheim, Prien, Traunstein and Freilassing. Since the timetable change in 2008, these trains have continued from Salzburg to Graz and Klagenfurt. In addition, an Intercity train pair, branded as the Königssee runs from Hamburg to Berchtesgaden over this line.

Railjet (RJ) services, which run from Munich to destinations in Austria and Hungary one hour before or after the EC services, run between Munich Hauptbahnhof and Salzburg Hauptbahnhof without stopping. The first RJ train pair ran between Budapest, Vienna and Munich at the 2008 timetable change.

EC and IC trains also operate between Munich, Rosenheim and Innsbruck on a basically two-hour cycle. Several of these train pairs continue over the Brenner to Bolzano, Verona and Venice or Bologna.

| Line | Route | | Frequency |
|---|---|---|---|
| IC 26 | Königsee: Hamburg-Altona – Hamburg – Hanover – Göttingen – Kassel-Wilhelmshöhe – Würzburg – Augsburg – Munich East – Berchtesgaden | | One train pair |
| EC 32 | Wörthersee: Münster – Dortmund – Essen – Duisburg – Düsseldorf – Cologne – Koblenz – Frankfurt – Mannheim – Heidelberg – Stuttgart – Ulm – Augsburg – Munich – Munich East – Salzburg – Klagenfurt | | One train pair |
| IC 60 | Karlsruhe – Stuttgart – Ulm – Augsburg – Munich – Munich East – Salzburg | | One train pair |
| EC 62 | Frankfurt – Heidelberg – | Stuttgart – Ulm – Augsburg – Munich – Munich East – Salzburg (– Klagenfurt / Graz / Linz) | Every 2 hours |
| EC 62 | Saarbrücken – Mannheim – | Stuttgart – Ulm – Augsburg – Munich – Munich East – Salzburg (– Klagenfurt / Graz / Linz) | Every 2 hours |
| EC 89 | Munich – Munich East – Kufstein – Innsbruck – Bolzano – Verona (– Venice / Bologna) | | Every 2 hours |

=== Freight ===
In 2008, the Munich–Rosenheim line was used by up to 150 freight trains on weekdays. Approximately 50 of these freight trains run on the line from Munich to Salzburg and continue towards Turkey, Greece, Ljubljana and Trieste. But the line from Munich to Kufstein is served by about 100 freight trains daily. These trains run mostly from Munich East marshalling yard to Verona (Brenner traffic) and are operated by TX Logistik.

== Upgrading ==
In the mid-1990s, the existing four-track section between Munich East and Zorneding was extended to Grafing station. Thus the Munich S-Bahn traffic ran on its own tracks, completely separated from the long-distance and regional traffic. Occasionally, however, non-S-Bahn trains run over the S-Bahn tracks, for example to avoid operational disturbances.

An extension of the four-track section from Grafing to Rosenheim and possibly further towards Kufstein is discussed from time to time to deal with the expected increase in traffic after the opening of the Brenner Base Tunnel.

On the other hand, with the commissioning of the Brenner Base Tunnel, the east–west traffic between Munich and Salzburg could be diverted over the Munich–Mühldorf–Freilassing–Salzburg route, which would be upgraded for this purpose in the form of upgraded section 38 of the main line (Magistrale) for Europe. This involves track doubling and electrification; construction has begun. This would allow the Munich–Rosenheim railway line to absorb the additional traffic from Munich towards Brenner.

The Federal Transport Plan (Bundesverkehrswegeplan) for 2030 includes a double-track new line from Grafing to Brannenburg via Großkarolinenfeld with a design speed of 230 km/h. The remaining section from Brannenburg to the German-Austrian border will be upgraded to four tracks.

This route is part of the Trans-European Transport Networks (TEN-T) line 17 from Paris to Budapest. This could lead to further upgrading projects. This is promoted by the Austrian Federal Railways (ÖBB), in particular, as it hopes to reduce travel time for long-distance passenger trains between Salzburg and Munich from the current one and a half hours to one hour.

== Accidents ==
A rear-end collision occurred at line kilometre 43.2 at Elkofen, between the stations of Aßling and Grafing, on 16 July 1945 at 21:40. At least 102 people died.
