= Haar, Bavaria =

Haar
- Town
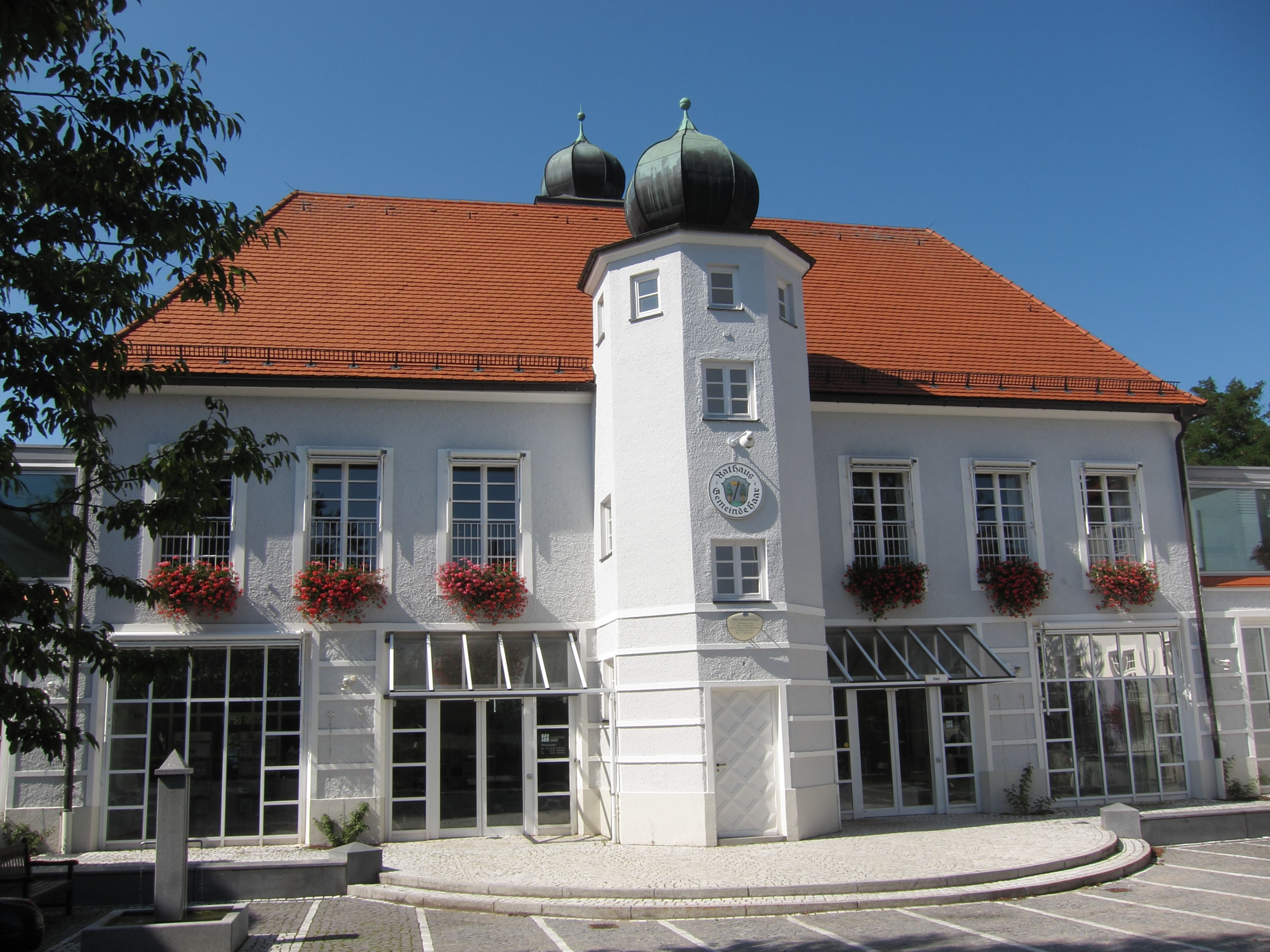
- Town hall

- Coat of arms

- Location of Haar within Munich district
- Interactive map of Haar
- Location within Germany Location within Bavaria
- Coordinates: 48°6′N 11°44′E
- Country: Germany
- State: Bavaria
- Admin. region: Oberbayern
- District: Munich

Government
  - Mayor (2020–26): Andreas Bukowski (CSU)

Area
  - Total: 12.9 km^{2} (5.0 sq mi)
- Elevation: 542 m (1,778 ft)

Population (2025-12-31)
  - Total: 22,934
  - Density: 1,780/km^{2} (4,600/sq mi)
- Time zone: UTC+01:00 (CET)
  - Summer (DST): UTC+02:00 (CEST)
- Postal codes: 85540
- Dialling codes: 089
- Vehicle registration: M

Haar (German pronunciation: [ˈhaːɐ̯]) is a town in the district of Munich, in Bavaria, Germany. It is 12 km east of Munich (centre). As of 2023, it had a population of more than 23,000.

It is home to the Haar Disciples, a team in the first division of German's Baseball Bundesliga. In October 2017, the Boards of Appeal of the European Patent Office were relocated to Haar.
