= Bernau am Chiemsee station =

Railway station in Germany

Bernau am Chiemsee
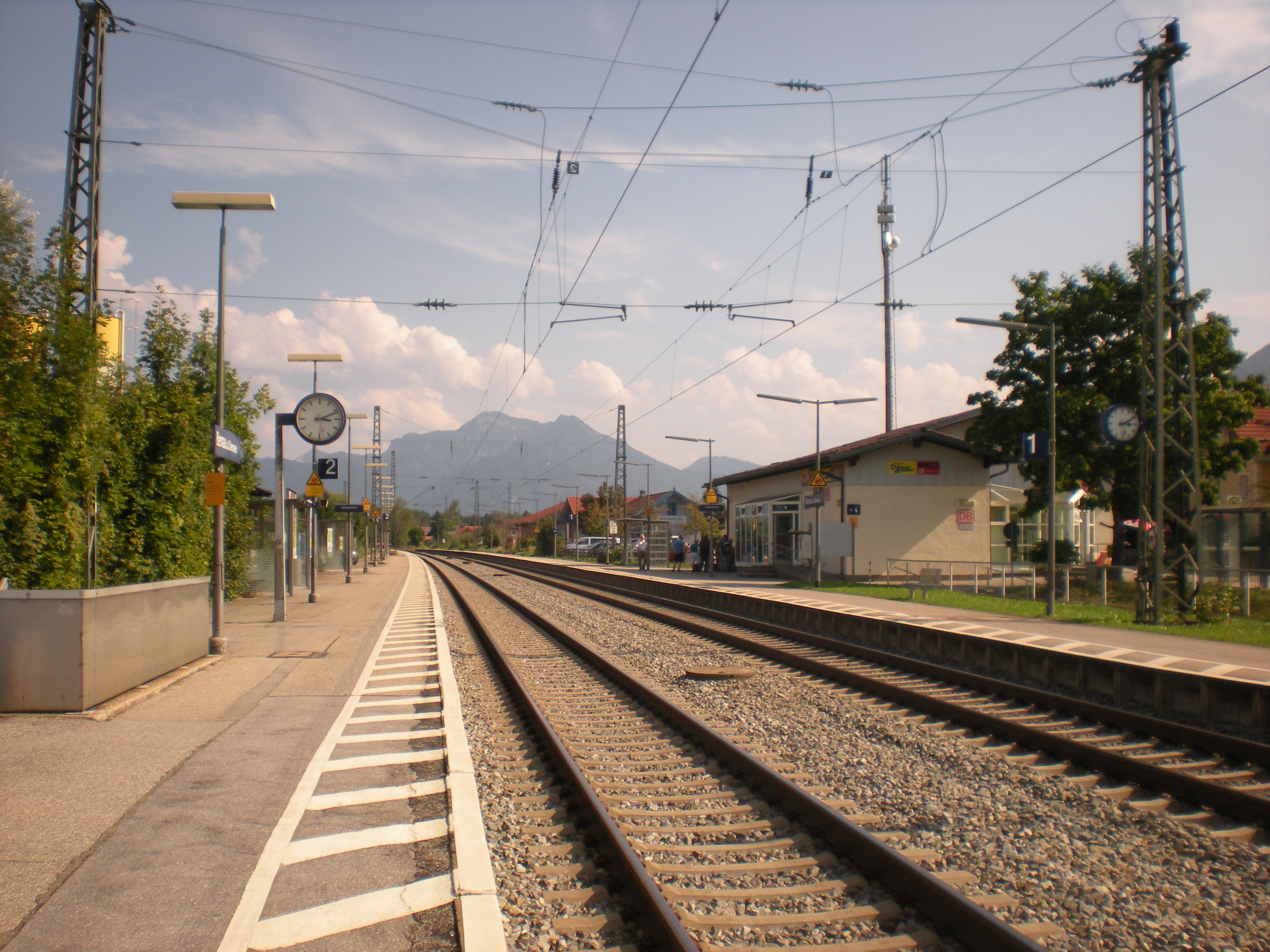

General information
- Location: Bahnhofplatz 3; 83233 Bernau am Chiemsee; Bavaria; Germany
- Coordinates: 47.8164°N 12.3808°E
- System: Hp
- Owner: Deutsche Bahn
- Operator: DB Netz; DB Station&Service
- Line: Rosenheim–Salzburg railway
- Platforms: 2 side platforms
- Tracks: 2
- Train operators: Bayerische Regiobahn

Other information
- Station code: 572
- DS100 code: MBN
- IBNR: 8000911
- Category: 5
- Website: www.bahnhof.de

History
- Opened: 7 May 1860; 166 years ago

Services
Preceding station		Following station
Prien am Chiemsee towards München Hbf	RE 5	Übersee towards Salzburg Hbf
Location
- Location within Bavaria Location within Germany Location within Europe

Bernau am Chiemsee station is a railway station in the municipality of Bernau am Chiemsee, located in the Rosenheim district in Bavaria, Germany.
