= Bernau =

Bernau may refer to:

- Bernau bei Berlin, a town in Brandenburg, Germany
- Bernau am Chiemsee, a municipality in the district of Rosenheim in Bavaria, Germany
- Bernau im Schwarzwald, a municipality in Baden-Württemberg, Germany
- Bernau im Rhein-Neckar-Kreis, a part of Waibstadt in Baden-Württemberg, Germany
