= Übersee station =

Railway station in Übersee, Germany

Übersee
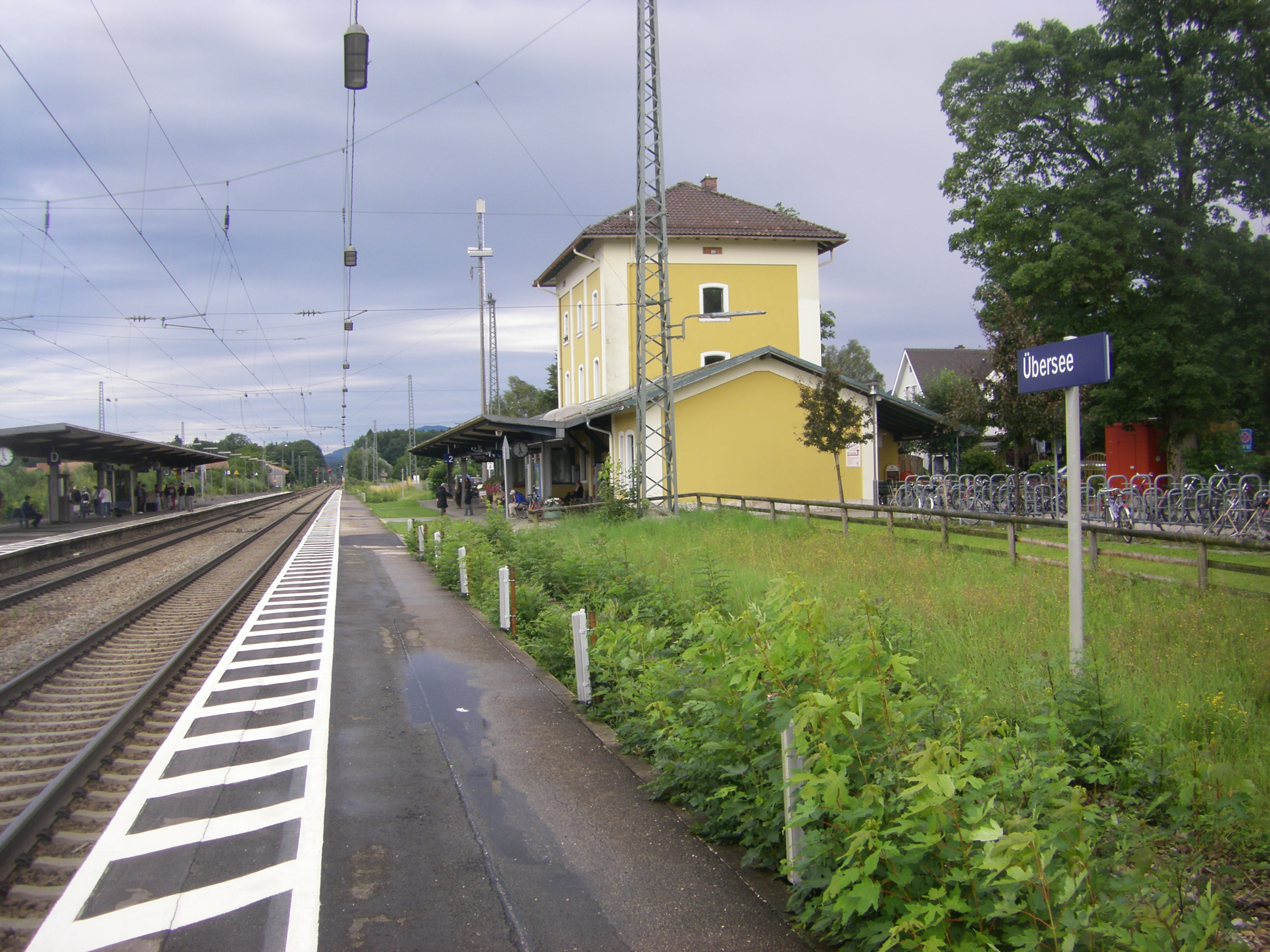

General information
- Location: Bahnhofstraße 31; 83236 Übersee; Bavaria; Germany
- Coordinates: 47.8220°N 12.4874°E
- Owner: Deutsche Bahn
- Operator: DB Netz; DB Station&Service
- Line: Rosenheim–Salzburg railway
- Platforms: 1 island platform 1 side platform
- Tracks: 3
- Train operators: Bayerische Regiobahn

Construction
- Accessible: No

Other information
- Station code: 6301
- DS100 code: MUS
- IBNR: 8005940
- Category: 5
- Website: www.bahnhof.de

History
- Opened: 7 May 1860; 166 years ago

Services
Preceding station		Following station
Bernau am Chiemsee towards München Hbf	RE 5	Bergen (Oberbayern) towards Salzburg Hbf
Location
- Location within Bavaria Location within Germany Location within Europe

Übersee station is a railway station in the municipality of Übersee, located in the Traunstein district in Bavaria, Germany.
