= Rosenheim–Salzburg railway =

German railway

Rosenheim–Salzburg Railway
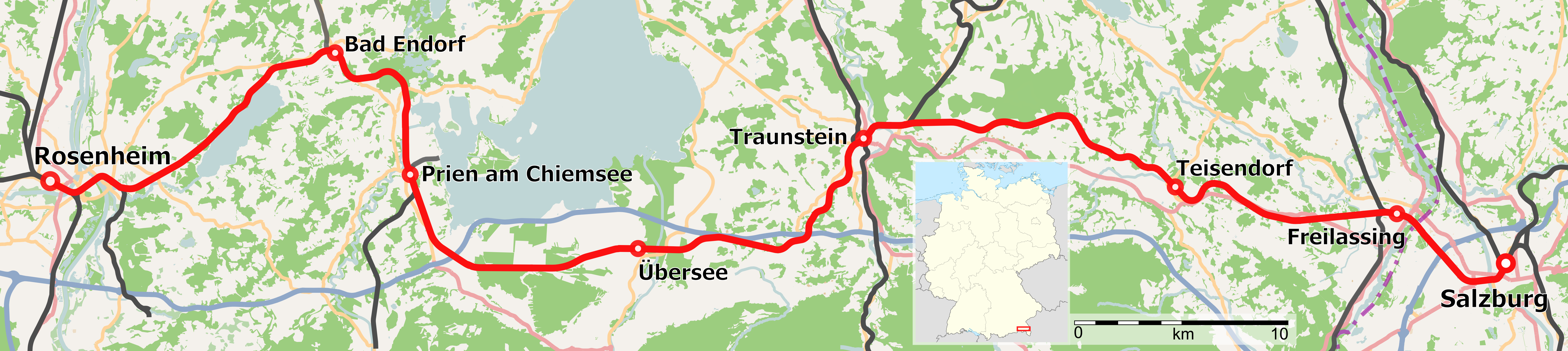

Overview
- Native name: Bahnstrecke Rosenheim-Salzburg
- Status: Operational
- Owner: Deutsche Bahn; Austrian Federal Railways
- Line number: 5703 (Rosenheim–Border of the states); 217 01 (Border of the states-Salzburg)
- Locale: Bavaria in Germany; Salzburg in Austria
- Termini: Rosenheim; Salzburg
- Stations: 13

Service
- Type: Heavy rail, Passenger/freight rail, Intercity rail, Regional rail, Commuter rail
- Route number: 951; 200 (Freilassing – Saalfelden)
- Operator(s): DB Bahn, EuroCity; Austrian Federal Railways

History
- Opened: Two stages in 1860

Technical
- Line length: 88.6 km (55.1 mi)
- Number of tracks: double track 3 (Salzburg Liefering - Salzburg Hbf)
- Electrification: 15 kV/16.7 Hz AC overhead catenary
- Operating speed: 160 km/h (99 mph)

The Rosenheim–Salzburg railway is a continuous double track and electrified main line railway almost entirely within the German state of Bavaria. It is an international transport corridor, linking Rosenheim to Salzburg in Austria.

== History ==
=== Planning, treaty and Munich-Rosenheim-Salzburg Railway Society ===
The first plan for a railway line between Rosenheim and Salzburg was in Friedrich List’s proposal in September 1828, which laid out as the main lines of the Bavarian network, a line from Bamberg via Nuremberg, Augsburg and Memmingen to Lindau, another from Kitzingen via Nuremberg and Augsburg to Munich and a third from Günzburg via Augsburg and Munich towards Austria. Simon Freiherr von Eichthal, a banker to the King of Bavaria, also called for a railway from Munich to Salzburg in 1835. On 5 January 1836, von Eichthal began a preliminary investigation of the building of the line. A messenger of the Bavarian government reported to the Austrian government on 7 April 1836 on the planned construction of the line. In 1838, von Eichthal failed to raise the necessary funds to carry the plan forward.

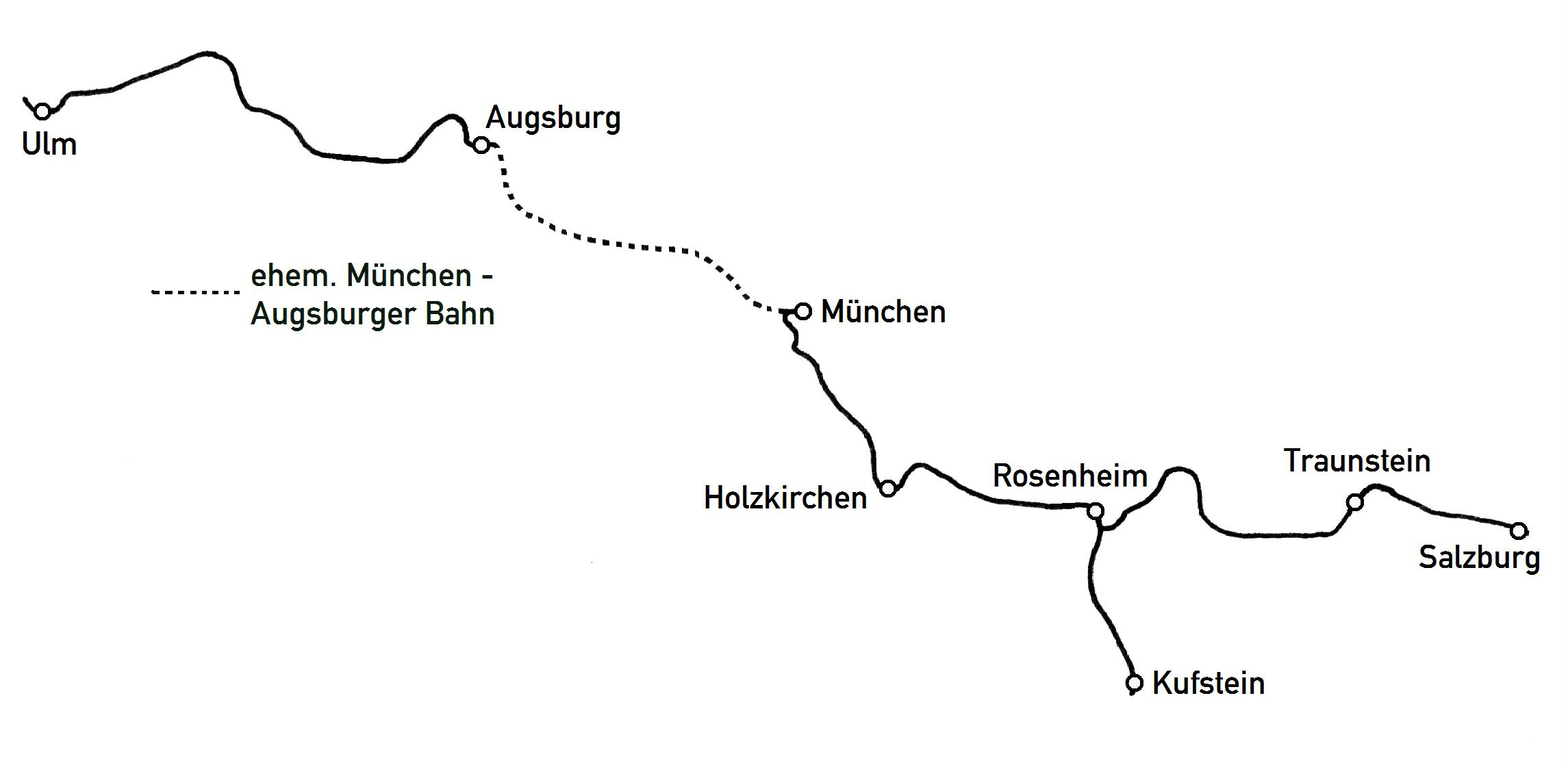
Line map of the Bavarian Maximilian's Railway

Negotiations with Austria began again in 1838. It was planned to build a connection from Salzburg to the proposed rail link from Vienna to Trieste. Austria had little interest in this project and, therefore, little was done in the following years. In Bavaria, where was a major economic crisis had broken out, Ludwig I said on 6 January 1842 that the completion of the construction of the Ludwig South-North Railway towards Austria was not possible. On 25 August 1843, a proposal for a west–east railway was finally issued. Ludwig I approved further negotiations with Austria on 22 October 1844. Friedrich August von Pauli, head of the Royal Railway Construction Commission (German: königlichen Eisenbahnbaukommension), travelled to Vienna in order to lead further negotiations. Austria also had limited resources for railway construction. On 10 September 1848, Joseph Anton von Maffei requested that the design, construction and operation be carried out by a private company. Maffei was then asked to present a plan. In the spring of 1849 the following route was selected: Munich–Glonn–Bad Aibling–Rosenheim–Prien am Chiemsee–Bernau am Chiemsee–Bergen–Freilassing–Salzburg. In August 1849, the plan for the foundation of a Munich-Rosenheim-Salzburg Railway Company (München-Rosenheim-Salzburger-Eisenbahn-Verein) was presented. The total cost would be 11 million guilders. The costs would be subscribed by 60,000 members of the company. The founding of the company was approved on 9 March 1850. The authorities sought to avoid a dispute over the route by modifying it. The new route ran via Holzkirchen rather than Glonn to give a better connection to the Miesbach coal field. Bavaria and Austria agreed to a treaty on 21 June 1851. This committed Bavaria to finish the Munich–Rosenheim–Kufstein/Salzburg railway by 1 March 1858. Austria was obliged, in return, to build a railway from Kufstein to Innsbruck by 1 March 1856 and to build a link from Salzburg to the Vienna–Trieste railway (Salzburg–Bruck) by 1 March 1858. Since the estimated cost of the railway continually increased from the beginning of 1852, the government now had to accept some of the costs. The state agreed to guarantee the society a return of two percent. At the beginning of 1852, it was questionable whether the company would be able to meet the specified opening date in the treaty at all. Therefore, the minister, Dr. Freiherr von Pfrodten sought a law that would allow the railway to continue to be built at state expense and operated as a state railway. Finally, on 7 May 1852 was decided to build the railway at government expense. In May 1854, the government announced that Austria would fail to comply with the opening schedule set out in the treaty because of the difficult terrain on the Salzburg–Bruck line. Bavaria then stopped all construction work. Austria was experiencing an economic crisis in 1854 and found it very difficult to negotiate a new treaty. The money for the construction of the railway was used for other purposes in the meantime. Negotiation of a new treaty was completed on 21 April 1856. The construction period for the Salzburg–Bruck railway was extended for five years. It has now estimated that the construction cost of the Rosenheim–Salzburg railway would be 9,412,985 million guilders.

=== Construction of the line ===
On 1 September 1851, construction began on the Großhesslohe bridge near Munich. Meanwhile, the necessary land was acquired for the other sections of the line. In 1852, with the acquisition of the construction work by the Royal Railways Commission (Königlichen Eisenbahnbaukommission), Friedrich August Pauli was appointed executive of the board. Eduard Rüber was appointed as an architect of the railway line and Johann Georg Beuschel as the chief engineer. New Royal Railway construction divisions were established Between Munich and Salzburg. They organized and carried out the construction work. In 1852, Royal Railway construction divisions were opened in Rosenheim and Traunstein in 1853, Royal Railway construction divisions followed in Prien am Chiemsee and Freilassing. Contracts were called for the construction of the line in a total of 26 sections. In May 1854, contracts for all works were let, except for those between Munich and Großhesselohe. The line from Munich to Großhesselohe was commissioned on 24 June 1854. Work only finally resumed after 21 April 1856, with the conclusion of the new treaty. On 31 October 1856 the Großhesselohe–Rosenheim line was opened on 5 August 1858. This was followed by the opening of the Rosenheim–Kufstein railway.

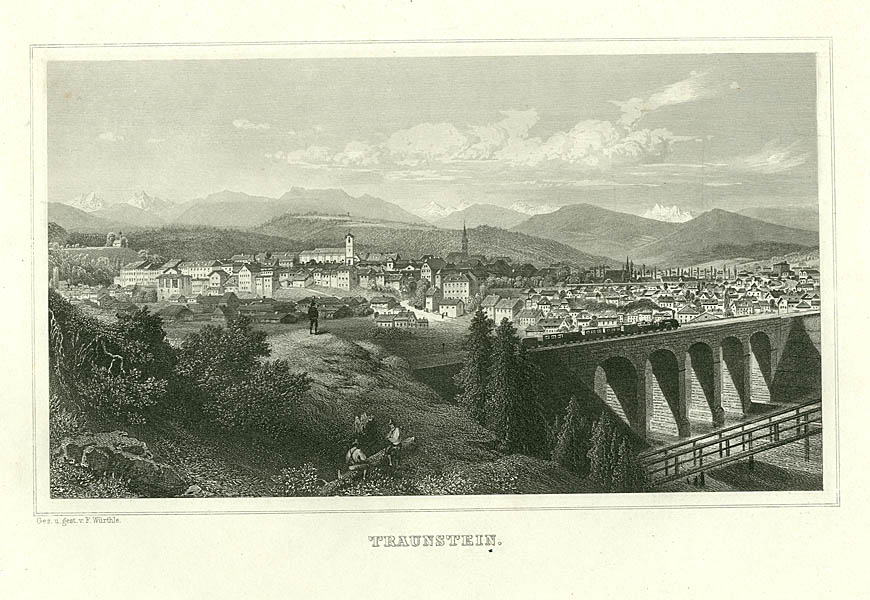
Traunstein: postcard with railway bridge

Construction work focussed on the Rosenheim–Kufstein line until early 1858 because the construction equipment was needed to complete the line on time. Further Royal Railway construction divisions were opened in Grabenstätt and Teisendorf. The construction work in the area of the Chiemsee and Simssee lakes progressed slowly. As the railway embankments slipped again and again, the embankments eventually had to be propped up with wooden scaffolding. A Roman settlement was also discovered during the construction work at Vachendorf. A trial run was operated on the Rosenheim–Traunstein section for the first time on 26 April 1860. This section is then put into operation on 7 May 1860. A trial run was operated on the section between Traunstein and Salzburg on 16 July 1860, which opened on 1 August 1860. On 12 August 1860, the entire line was opened in the presence of King Maximilian II and Emperor Franz Joseph. The celebrations lasted for three days.

Construction costs totalled 10,204,649 million guilders, of which 8,073,432 million guilders were for the embankment and the superstructure, 568,301 million guilders for the station buildings and 522,642 million guilders were for supervision and management. These were average costs in Bavaria.

=== Transport development in the country and railway duplication ===
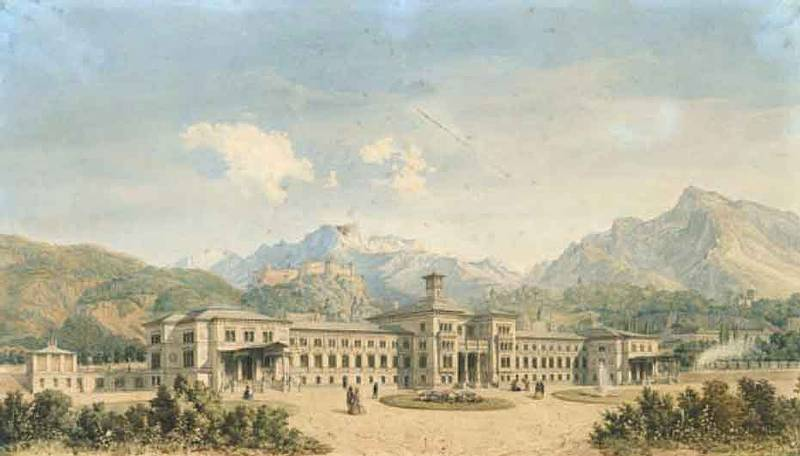
Salzburg station about 1870

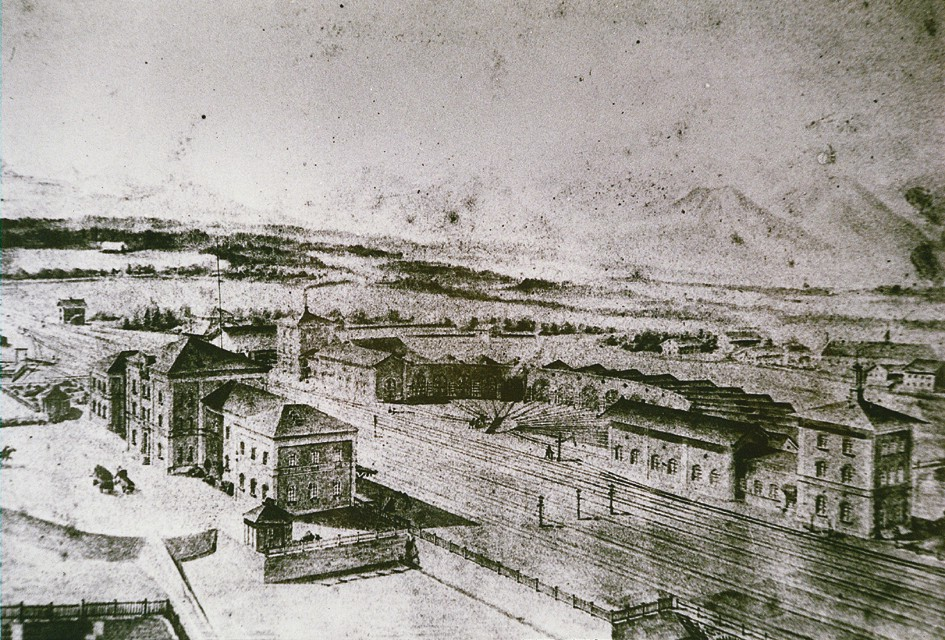
Picture of the old Rosenheim station

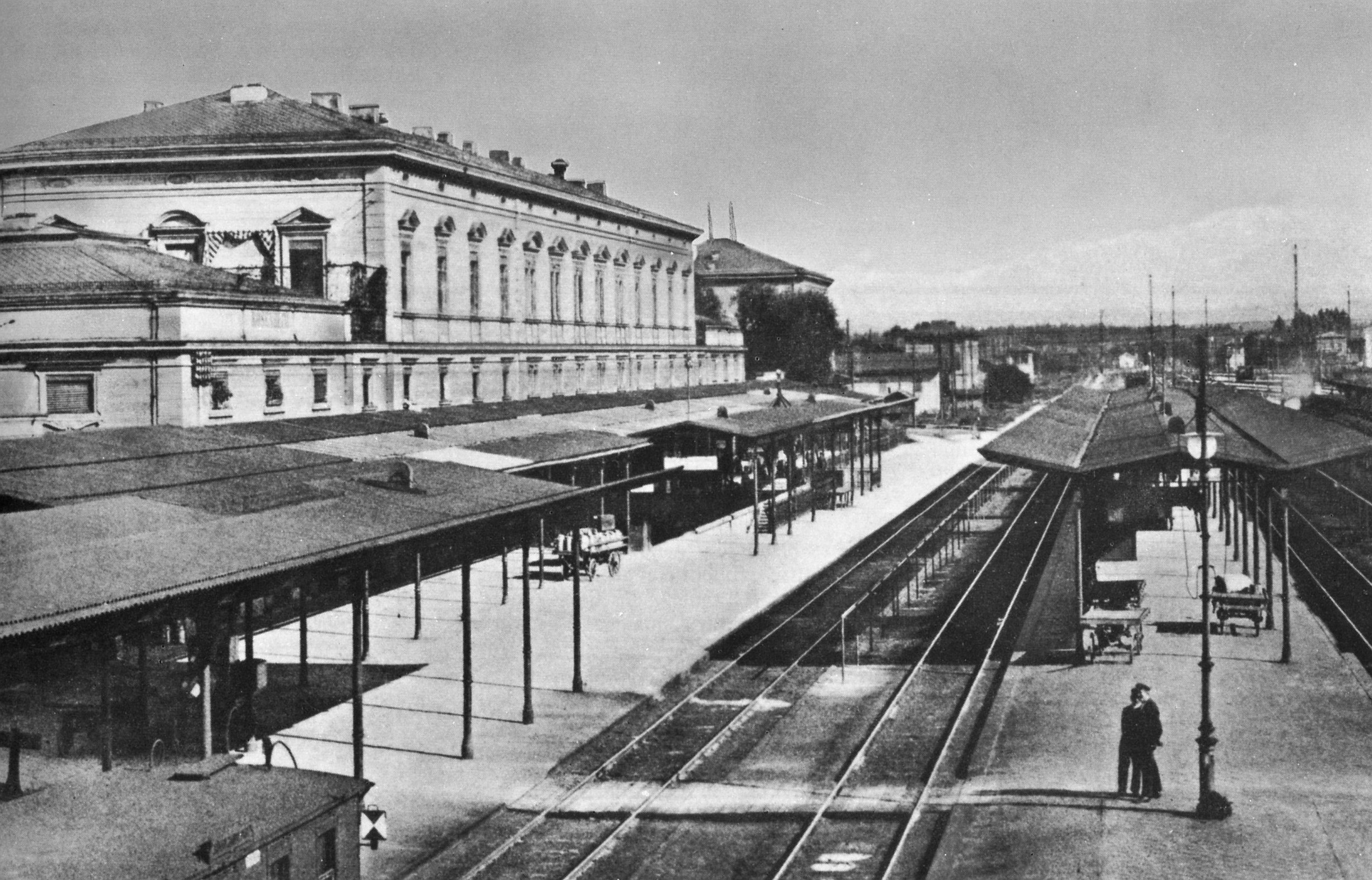
New Rosenheim station in 1905

In 1866 a branch line was opened from Freilassing towards Bad Reichenhall (now part of the Salzburg–Berchtesgaden railway). On 1 June 1871 the Munich–Mühldorf-Linz railway was put into operation. After that all traffic to Vienna ran over this route because it was shorter. On 15 October 1871 the Munich-Grafing–Rosenheim railway line opened. This route had better grades, which made the use of bank engines unnecessary. As the volume of traffic in Rosenheim station grew, the station was moved. The new station was opened on 19 April 1876.

There was a big boom in freight and passenger traffic in the 1880s. In order for goods and people to continue to be transported by rail, it was decided to duplicate the main lines of the Bavarian railway network. In 1890, the line was already served of 26 pairs of trains, including six pairs of expresses. Thus, a law was passed on 29 December 1891 that authorised the duplication of the lines between Munich–Grafing, Rosenheim and the Austrian border at Freilassing and between Rosenheim and the border at Kufstein. This anticipated the rise in traffic during the coming years. The contracts for the duplication of the Rosenheim–Freilassing line were let as nine sections. Duplication began in 1893 between Rosenheim and Stephanskirchen and it was completed over the entire route in 1894. The second main track between Rosenheim and Endorf went into operations on 1 August 1894. The duplication between Endorf and Prien was carried out and placed in operation at the end of 1894. This was followed by the commissioning of the second track between Prien and Traunstein on 1 October 1895 and between Traunstein and Freilassing on 29 November. The second track between Salzburg and Freilassing was not put into operation until 1889 because of difficult conditions in Salzburg. The duplication between Rosenheim and the border at Freilassing cost a total of 4,115,500 Marks. In 1892, construction started on centralised interlockings at the stations of Prien am Chiemsee, Bad Endorf, Übersee, Bergen and Lauter. The track speed limit averaged 90 km/h. In the following period, the number of trains increased as a result of the duplication so that the route was served by 38 trains each way by 1900. The Orient Express ran over the Rosenheim–Salzburg line from 1897; it had previously run via Mühldorf and Simbach.

=== World War I and electrification ===
The scheduled passenger traffic was severely restricted during World War I, so that only four pairs of trains ran each way from the beginning of the war. The line, however, became an important military connection to Austria and the Balkans.

In 1921, there were plans for the electrification of the Holzkirchen–Rosenheim, Rosenheim–Kufstein and Rosenheim–Freilassing lines. When the plans were completed in 1923, the Deutsche Reichsbahn did not have the financial means to implement them. When the Deutsche Reichsbahn Company was founded in 1924, the electrification of the main lines was seen as a major goal. Therefore, the electrification of the Munich–Grafing–Rosenheim, Rosenheim–Kufstein and Rosenheim–Salzburg lines was now planned. Electrification was completed between Munich and Rosenheim on 12 April 1927 and between Rosenheim and Kufstein on 15 July 1927. Electrification commenced between Rosenheim and Freilassing in August 1927. The overhead line between Rosenheim and Traunstein was completed on 21 March 1928. Operations commenced on the Traunstein–Freilassing section on 19 April 1928. The required electricity was partly supplied by the Walchensee Hydroelectric Power Station. This was supplied through a substation in Rosenheim (completed on 5 March 1928), which was connected by a 110 kV transmission line to the power station. A substation was built in Traunstein, which was connected via another transmission line to the Rosenheim sub-station.

=== Second World War and reconstruction ===
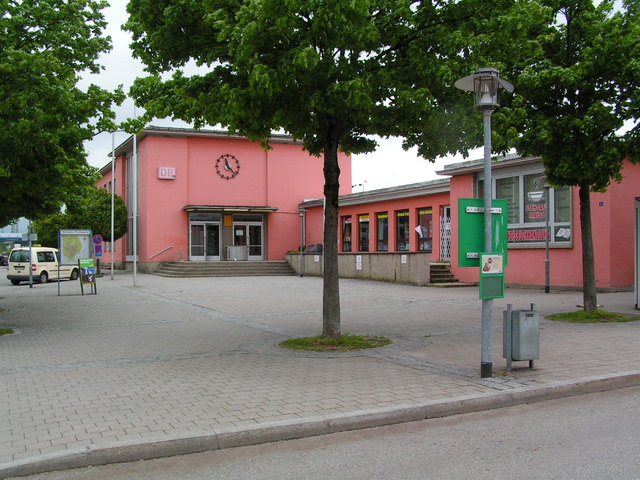
The new Freilassing station building built after the war

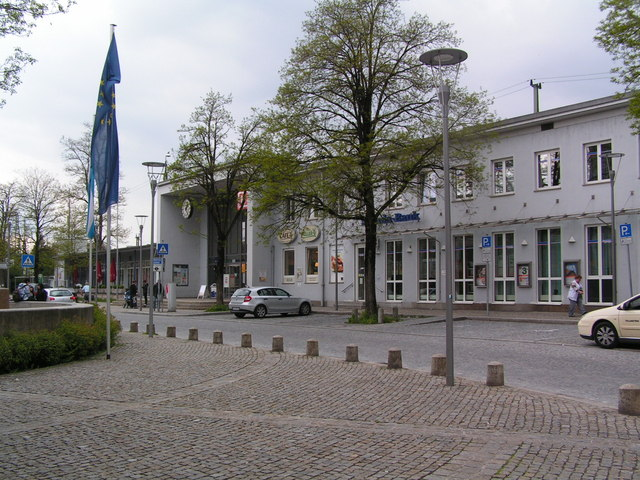
The rebuilt Traunstein station building

During World War II the rail traffic was again severely restricted, as the railway was mainly used by military trains. Salzburg was the target of numerous air raids between 16 October 1944 and 1 May 1945. Salzburg station was also destroyed. Rosenheim station was destroyed by numerous bombs between 18 and 20 April 1945 and operations at the station were not possible after that. 100 people died in Traunstein and the station area was almost completely destroyed in air raids between 18 and 25 April. A further 70 people died in air raids on Freilassing station on 25 April 1945 and the station building and some adjacent houses were destroyed in the attacks. On 2 May 1945 a train with Jewish prisoners passed through Traunstein and the prisoners were taken off the train and shot in a wooded area. In the following days, numerous bridges around Traunstein was prepared for demolition. The demolitions were prevented by the surrender of Traunstein without a fight. The surrender the city of Salzburg without a fight was negotiated on Saalach bridge on 4 May 1945. After the war ended in May 1945, only a single track was usable on most of the line. Only single track operations were possible in Rosenheim station, on the Übersee–Traunstein–Lauter section, in Teisendorf station, in Freilassing station and on the Freilassing–Salzburg section. On 18 May 1945, the first trains were run again for the U.S. Army and the line was once again a major military route. In 1949, the line was still operable at only 85 km/h.

The station buildings in Rosenheim, Traunstein and Freilassing, which were destroyed by air raids in World War II, were replaced in Traunstein and Freilassing by wooden sheds; a small part of the building was preserved in Rosenheim and continued to be used along with newly constructed wooden sheds. In 1952, a new station was completed in Traunstein. New buildings were completed in Rosenheim and Freilassing in 1954. The buildings were all built in the same style and look similar to each other. The war damage to the line was not eliminated until the mid-1950s, when normal operations were restored.

=== Modernisation of the line until today ===
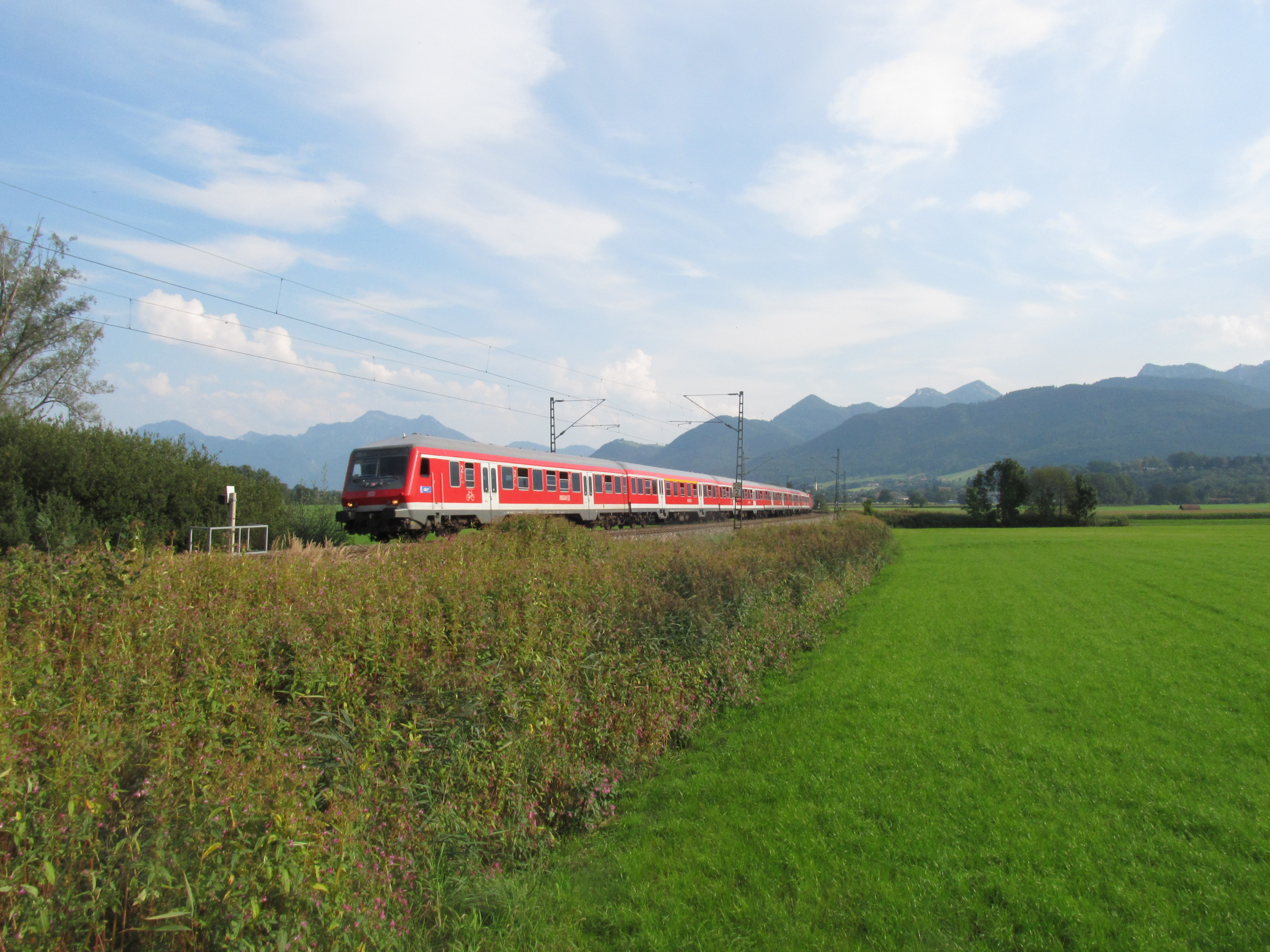
Regional-Express near Bernau am Chiemsee

In the 1960s, the signalling systems were rebuilt along the entire route. Automatic block signaling was established between Salzburg and Freilassing in 1963. In addition, push button relay interlockings were installed in Prien and Bad Endorf stations in 1963. An automatic block system was installed between the two stations on 28 June 1964 for 233,000 Deutsche Marks, making the signalbox at Rimstings station unnecessary. On 14 July 1969 and in the following days, the automated route setting interlocking in Traunstein, the automatic block system between Übersee and Traunstein and the automatic block system between Traunstein and Teisendorf opened. So for 2.092 million Deutsche Marks the personnel at Bergen (Oberbay) and Lauter (Oberbay) were able to be saved. On 11 December 1978, a centralised block was established between Teisendorf and Freilassing, which was controlled by an automated route setting interlocking of the SpDrS60 design. An automatic block system went into operation between Prien am Chiemsee and Übersee on 1 July 1980. Bergen (Oberbay) station was closed to passenger traffic at the same time. An automatic block system was taken into operation between Landl (Oberbay) and the start of the Rosenheim curve on 21 January 1982. The automatic block system between Landl and Bad Endorf was not opened until 26 November 1985. The entire upgrade between Rosenheim and Bad Endorf cost 4.7 million Deutsche Marks. An electronic interlocking was put into operation at Rosenheim between 19 and 23 November 2003. Electronic interlockings that are controlled from Munich have operated at Bad Endorf and Prien am Chiemsee stations since 2 March 2005.

=== Upgrade between Freilassing and Salzburg ===
Between Freilassing and Salzburg there has been a massive upgrade in recent years and the Salzach bridge has been rebuilt with three tracks. The two existing tracks between the neighbouring towns are being rebuilt and are being supplemented by a third track to give the necessary capacity to enable regular interval operations on the Salzburg S-Bahn. The first of the four new stations on this section, Salzburg Taxham-Euro Park was opened in June 2006 and the Mülln and Aiglhof stations opened in December 2009. Liefering station was opened in December 2013.

In February 2013, Deutsche Bahn and the Federal Ministry of Transport signed a financial agreement for the upgrading of the line from the Austrian/German border to Freilassing to three tracks. Funding of €50 million, of which €8.5 million is EU funding, has been earmarked for this work. The largest structure is an additional bridge over the Saalach.

== Route ==
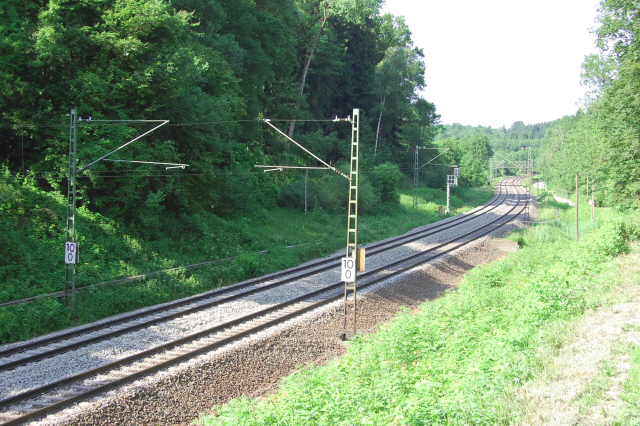
Rosenheim-Salzburg railway near Inzenham

At Rosenheim the line runs to the northeast and crosses the Inn. The former branch line to Frasdorf branches off at the former Landl station; it is now runs only to Rohrdorf and only carries freight to the local cement plant. After that, the route makes a steep climb to Simssee. This is followed by Bad Endorf (Oberbay) station, where a branch line branches off to Obing. It was closed down by Deutsche Bahn in 1996, but reopened on 1 July 2006 as a tourist railway known as the Chiemgau Lokalbahn (local railway), operating mainly on summer Sundays and public holidays. The line continues west of the Chiemsee lake towards Prien am Chiemsee station, where two lines connect. On the northern side is the narrow gauge Chiemsee Railway (Chiemseebahn) to the port of Prien-Stock on Chiemsee, said to be the oldest continuously operating steam railway in the world. On the south side is the Chiemgau Railway (Chiemgau Bahn) to Aschau im Chiemgau. The line then runs through Bernau am Chiemsee station and continues to the east. A line formerly ran from Übersee station to Marquartstein. It crosses the Tiroler Ache river at Übersee and then follows a gradient of 1:100 to Bergen (Oberbay) station.

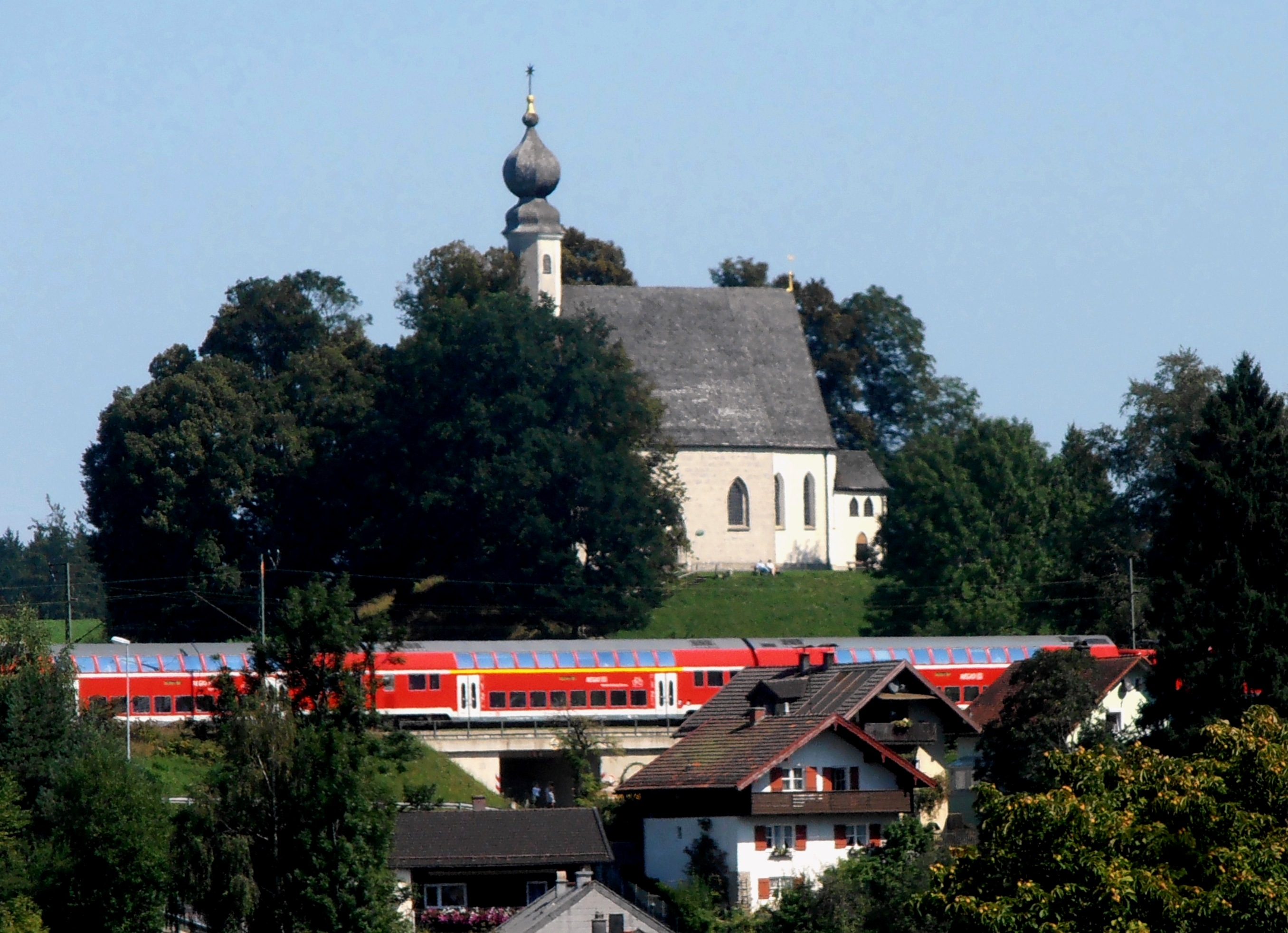
Ettendorf church

The next station is Traunstein, where several lines branch off: the line to Ruhpolding, the line to Traunreut and Garching and the line to Waging. In Traunstein the railway passes over a bridge over the Traun. The line runs over a steep downhill section towards Freilassing. Shortly after leaving Traunstein station, Ettendorf church (St. Vitus and Anna) lies next to the line. In Freilassing station a branch from Mühldorf and another branch from Berchtesgaden join the line. On the outskirts of Freilassing the line crosses the border, which runs along the Saalach river, into Austria and the outskirts of Salzburg. In Siezenheim there is a freight yard with sidings to a large chipboard factory in an industrial area and to the Schwarzenberg barracks. Then the line runs between the districts of Taxham, Maxglan and Mülln to the south and Lehen and Liefering to the north across the Salzach to Salzburg Hauptbahnhof.

=== Operating points ===
==== Rosenheim ====
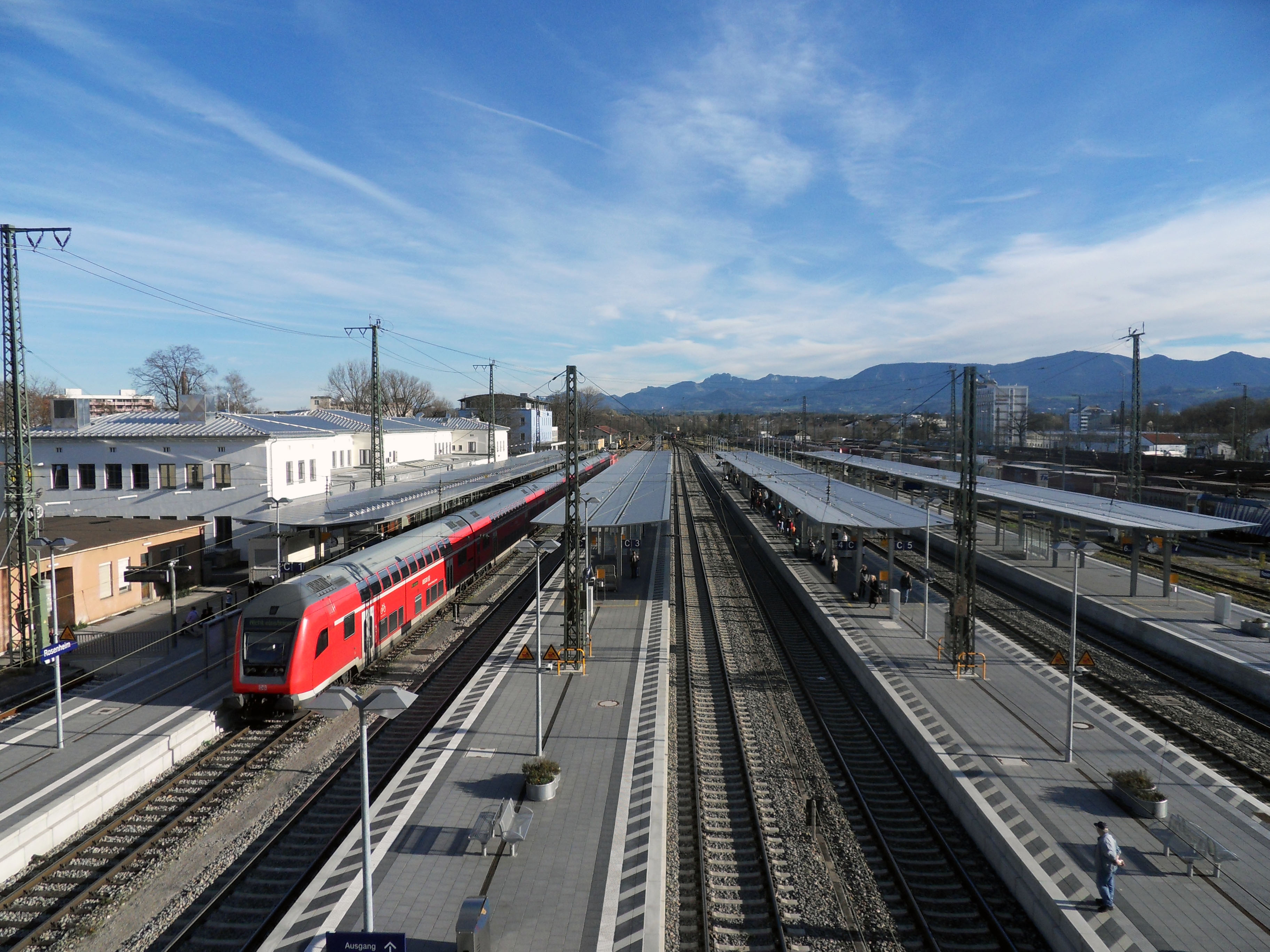
Platforms of Rosenheim station

The station was opened on 24 October 1857 with the Mangfall Valley Railway as a provisional station. Because of some delays, the permanent station was not opened until 13 November 1858. Due to a lack of space, the old station was closed and a new one was opened west of the old station on 19 April 1876. The Rosenheim locomotive depot (Bahnbetriebswerk) was also significant for the line.

Today, the station is the seventh largest station in Bavaria with about 20,000 passengers each day. It is used by about 150 regional and long-distance passenger services each day.

==== Landl (Oberbay) junction ====
The Royal Bavarian State Railways (Königlich Bayerischen Staatseisenbahnen) established Landl (Oberbay) junction on 27 January 1913 as a block post (Blockstelle). On 9 May 1914, the junction became a halt on the branch line from Rosenheim to Frasdorf. The station had two sidings and a station building in which the mechanical signal box was located. The last passenger train served the station and ran on the line to Frasdorf in September 1970. The station was then rebuilt as a branch point. The mechanical signal box was replaced by the relay interlocking in Rosenheim station in 1977.

==== Stephanskirchen station ====
The station was opened in 1860 with a crossing loop on the first single-track railway line. A loading ramp, loading road and a goods shed were available for goods traffic. Passenger traffic was abandoned on 31 May 1981 and freight traffic ended four years later on 25 November 1985.

==== Simssee halt ====
The halt (Haltepunkt) was put into operation in 1934. It mainly served excursion traffic to the Simssee and was therefore served for many years only in the summer season. The station was closed on 28 August 1967.

==== Krottenmühl halt ====
A halt for passenger traffic was opened in Krottenmühl on 15 October 1895; a few years later it was also used for freight traffic. A mechanical signal box has controlled the switches and signals since 5 February 1901. The freight and passenger traffic was discontinued on 31 May 1981. The entrance building still exists.

==== Bad Endorf (Oberbay) station ====
Bad Endorf station was opened in 1860. The station became a junction station when the branch line to Obing was opened on 15 October 1908. The Obing line was closed for passenger operations in 1986 and for freight in 1996. The line to Obing was reopened as a heritage railway in 2006.

==== Rimsting station ====
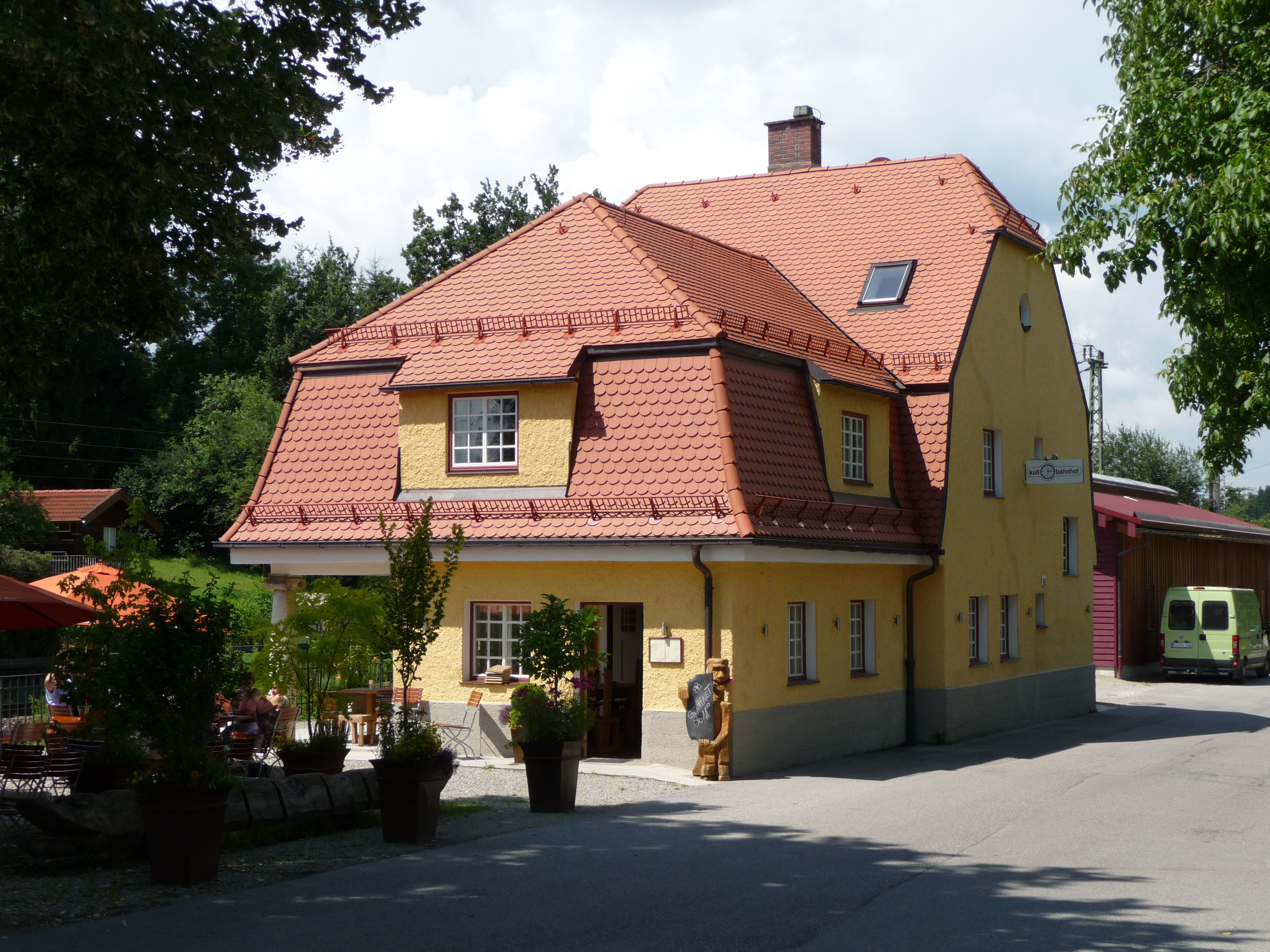
Rimsting station

In 1881, the halt of Rimsting was built so that king Ludwig II could visit the construction site of the New Herrenchiemsee Palace. 70 years later, in 1981, the station was closed for passenger traffic. A siding still exists for freight traffic. The station building, which was built in 1911 and is now heritage-listed, houses a cultural meeting place.

==== Prien am Chiemsee station ====
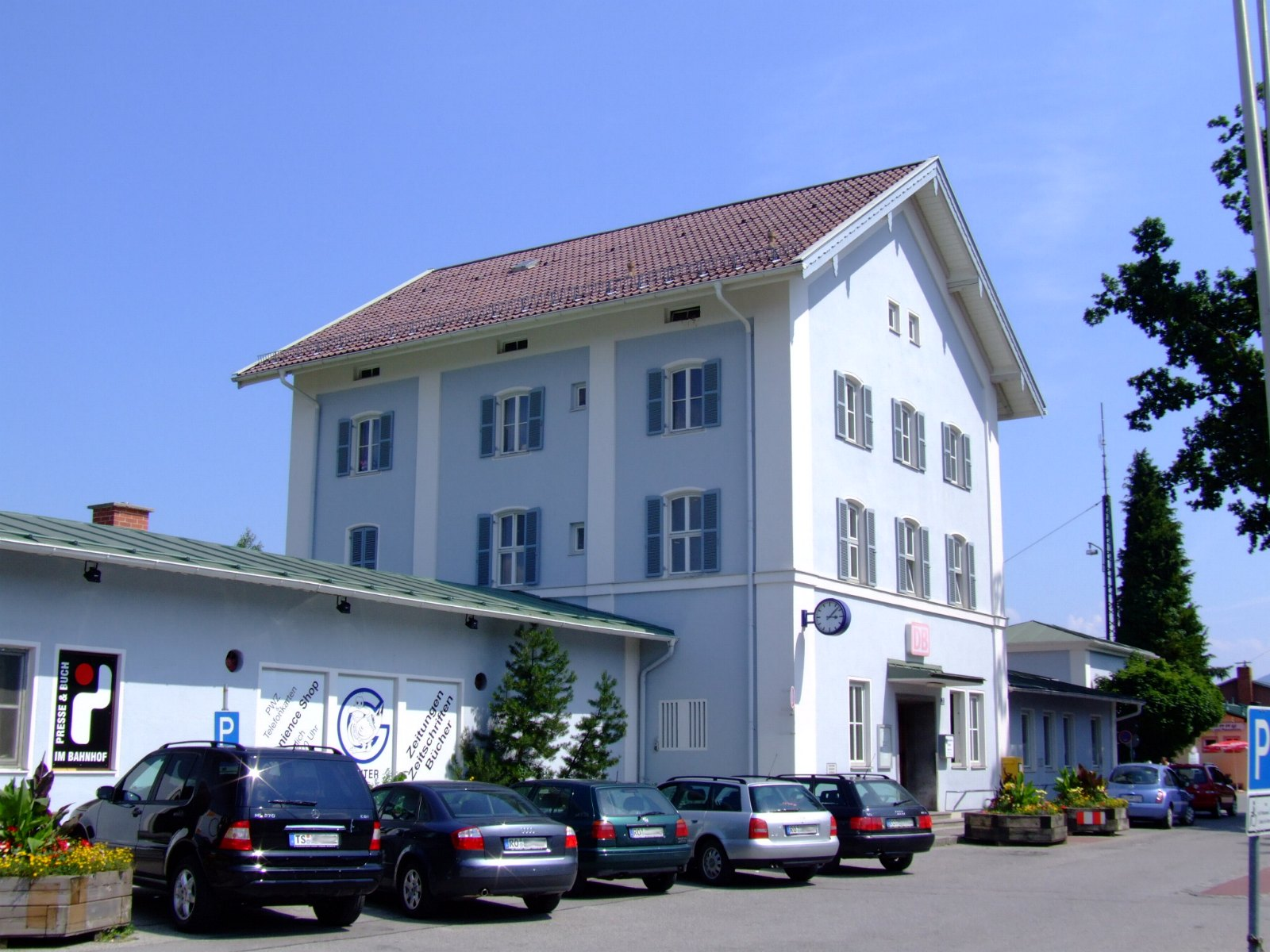
Prien am Chiemsee station building

The station was put into operation with the opening of the line in 1860. Here the Chiemgau Railway (Chiemgaubahn), which went into operation in 1878, branches off to Aschau. Since 1887, the station has also been starting point of the Chiemsee Railway (Chiemseebahn) to Prien-Stock.

==== Bernau am Chiemsee halt ====
Bernau am Chiemsee station was opened in 1860. The station had two platform tracks and a third track and some sidings for freight. The station had a two-storey entrance building, which was extended in 1875 by two side buildings. A mechanical signal box was completed in July 1904. The station was downgraded to a halt in early 1980. Ten years later, freight traffic was abandoned. The station building was renovated in 2003.

==== Rottau crossover ====
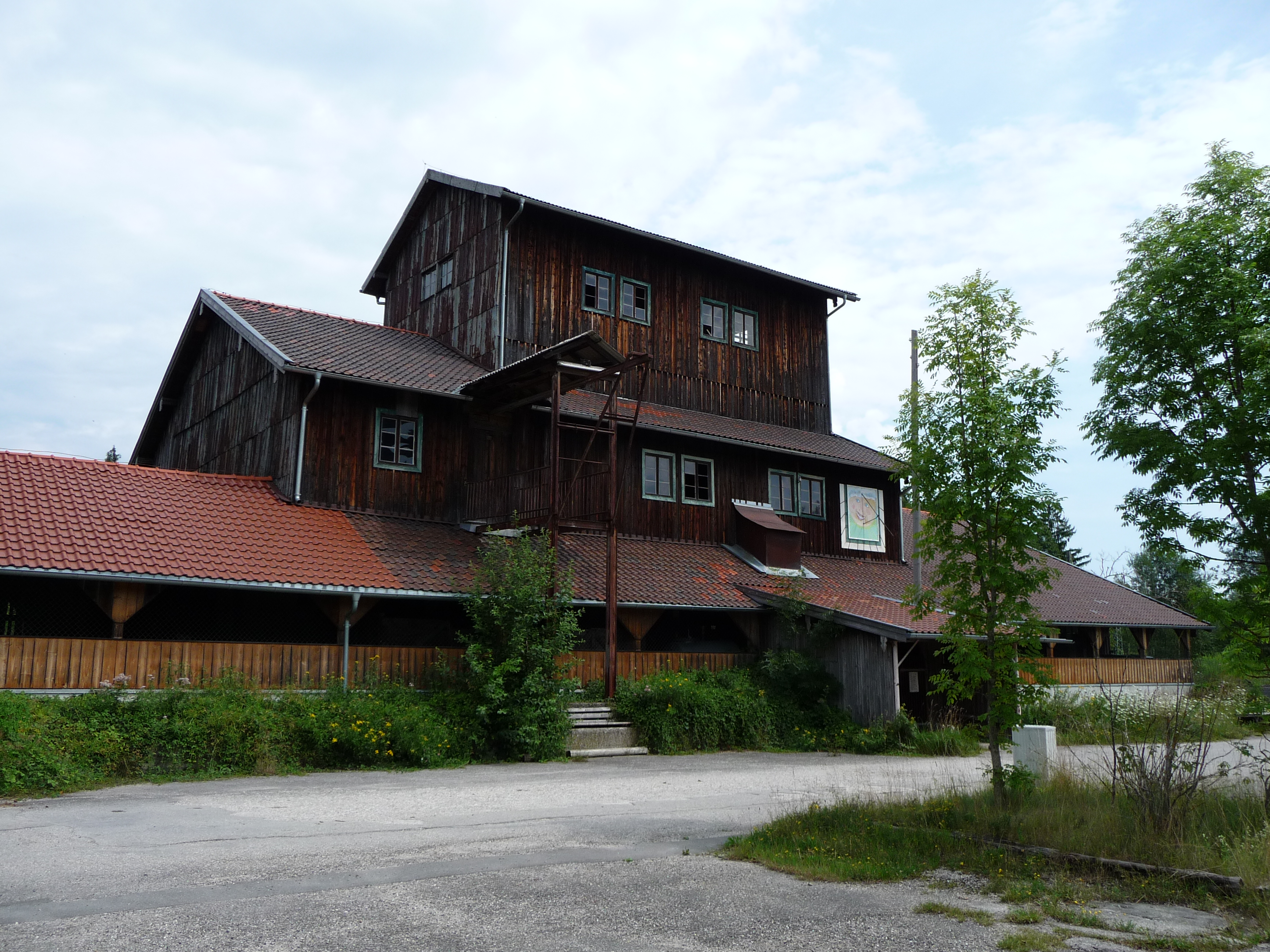
Rottau peat railway station

Rottau station was put into operation in December 1920. It was used to load peat from the Rottau peat railway. In June 1988, the operations of the peat railway were abandoned and the station became a crossover.

==== Übersee station ====
Übersee station was put into operation in 1860. It became a junction station in 1885 with the opening of the Übersee–Marquartstein railway. This ended in 1992 when the line to Marquartstein was closed.

==== Bergen (Oberbay) halt ====
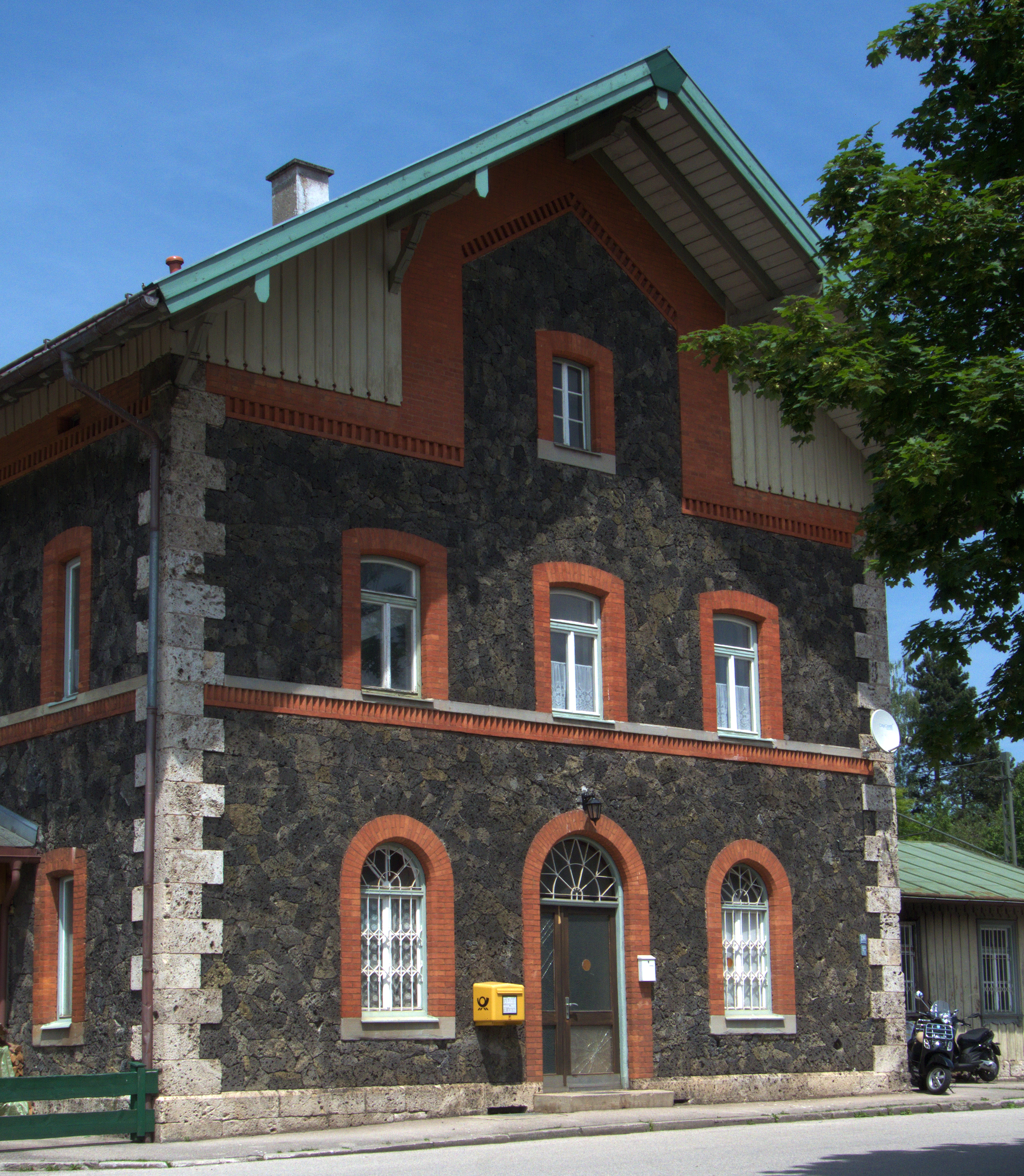
Listed entrance building of Bergen (Oberbay)

Bergen station was commissioned in 1860 with the opening of the line. The station was converted to a halt before 1990. The entrance building is heritage-listed.

==== Traunstein station ====
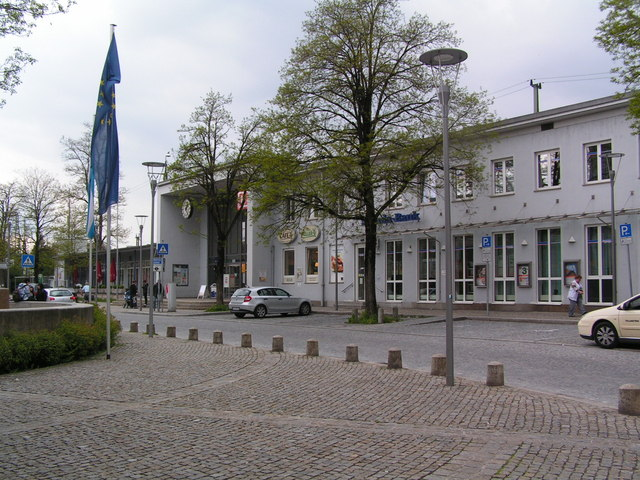
Traunstein station

The station was opened on 7 May 1860 with the Rosenheim–Salzburg railway. The station became a railway junction in the following years. Today there are connecting lines to Ruhpolding, Waging and Trostberg / Traunreut.

==== Lauter (Oberbay) crossover ====
Lauter (Oberbay) station was opened with the opening of the Rosenheim–Salzburg railway. There were two platform tracks and another dead-end track with a loading ramp and a goods shed. The station was closed for passenger traffic in 1982 and for freight in 1990. Since then Lauter has been a crossover.

==== Rückstetten halt ====
The Rückstetten block post has existed since March 1906 and passenger trains have also stopped there since 1908. The Rückstetten block post was closed in July 1969 and Rückstetten station was closed on 23 May 1982.

==== Teisendorf station ====
Teisendorf station was opened with the railway in 1860. After its opening, the station had larger than usual passenger and freight traffic because a road ran from Teisendorf to Bad Reichenhall and Berchtesgaden. The station had two platform tracks and another track and several sidings for freight. Around 1900, a mechanical signal box was completed in Teisendorf; this was replaced in 1978 by a relay interlocking controlled using a track plan display. Freight operations were stopped in the 1990s, except for a rail connection to an LPG depot. The entrance building has been privately owned since 2008.

==== Niederstraß halt ====
A halt was established in Niederstraß in 1895; this mainly served the loading of peat from the surrounding area. After the First World War, it was also connected to its own narrow-gauge peat railway. Parts of it are operated as a museum railway operated by the Freunde Ainringer Moos e.V. The halt was closed for passenger traffic on 1 October 1978. The building has been privately owned since April 1984; it has been rebuilt and as a result it is no longer accessible to the public. The peat loading ended in May 1990. After the realignment of the federal highway B 304 on 26 October 2015, the level crossing was closed and the barriers were dismantled. The siding for the former peat plant and the warehouse were already dismantled before the end of peat mining.

==== Freilassing station ====
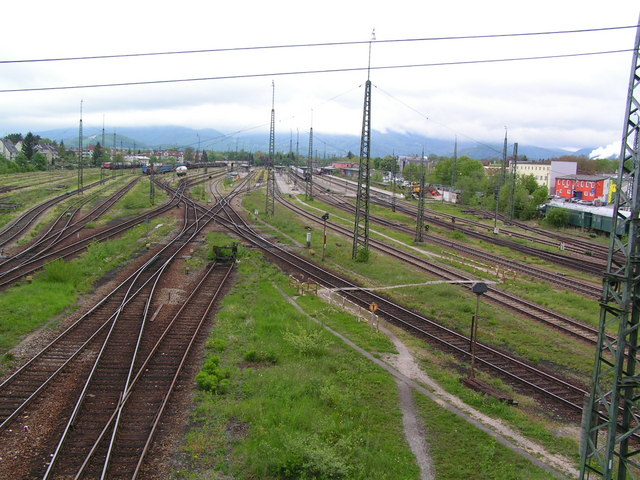
Tracks of Freilassing station

The station was put into operation with the opening of the line in 1860 and served as a border station between Bavaria and Austria. In 1905, an important locomotive depot was opened in the station. Today, the Freilassing Locomotive World (Lokwelt Freilassing) is located in the locomotive depot. It is also a stop of the Salzburg S-Bahn.

==== Salzburg Liefering yard ====
During the Nazi period, Liefering station was put into operation on 1 June 1943 exclusively for invited guests to Obersalzberg. It was no longer used for passenger services after the war. It remained in use, however, as a goods yard and operational yard. The station was reopened as a halt in December 2013 as part of the establishment of the Salzburg S-Bahn.

==== Salzburg Taxham Europark station ====
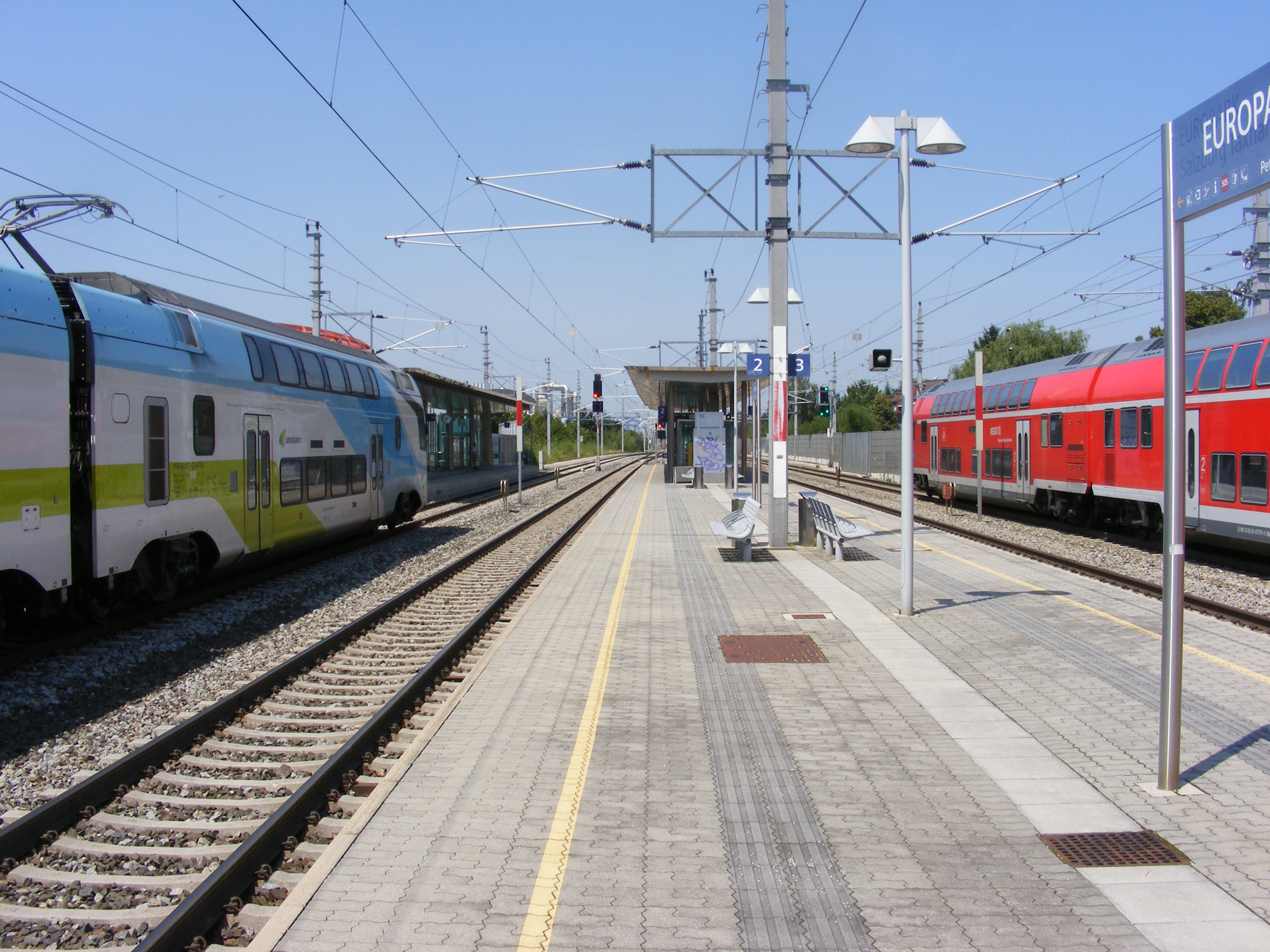
Platforms of Salzburg Taxham Europark station

The line was upgraded for S-Bahn operations between Salzburg and Freilassing and received new stations. Salzburg Taxham Europark station was put into operation on 17 June 2006. The station has three platform tracks and is served by S-Bahn services and some regional services. The station was named after the adjoining Europark shopping centre.

==== Salzburg Aiglhof halt ====
The S-Bahn halt of Salzburg Aiglhof was opened on 13 December 2009 and it served mainly by S-Bahn services, but it is also served by some regional trains. The halt is named after the adjacent settlement of Aiglhof. The building of the barrier-free island platform required the demolition of freight tracks. The platform is covered for 70 metres and has steps and lifts at both ends.

==== Salzburg Mülln-Altstadt halt ====
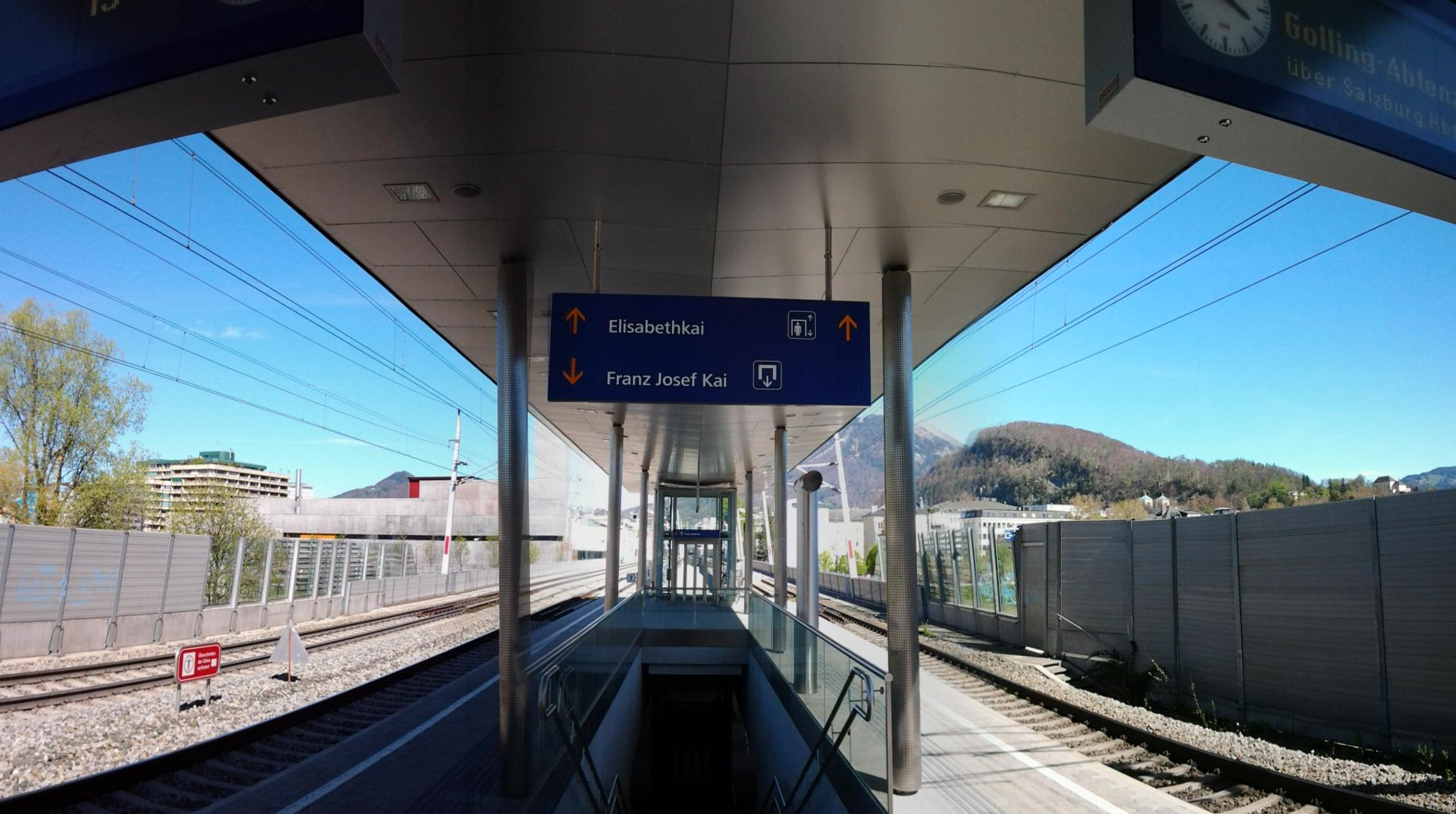
Platforms of Salzburg Mülln-Altstadt station

The halt was opened for the S -Bahn operations between Freilassing and Salzburg on 13 December 2009. Like Salzburg Aiglhof, it is served mainly by S-Bahn and regional operations. It has a barrier-free island platform and there are lifts at the two exits. The halt is located directly on the banks of the Salzach and serves, inter alia, the Salzburg district of Altstadt (old town).

==== Salzburg Hauptbahnhof ====
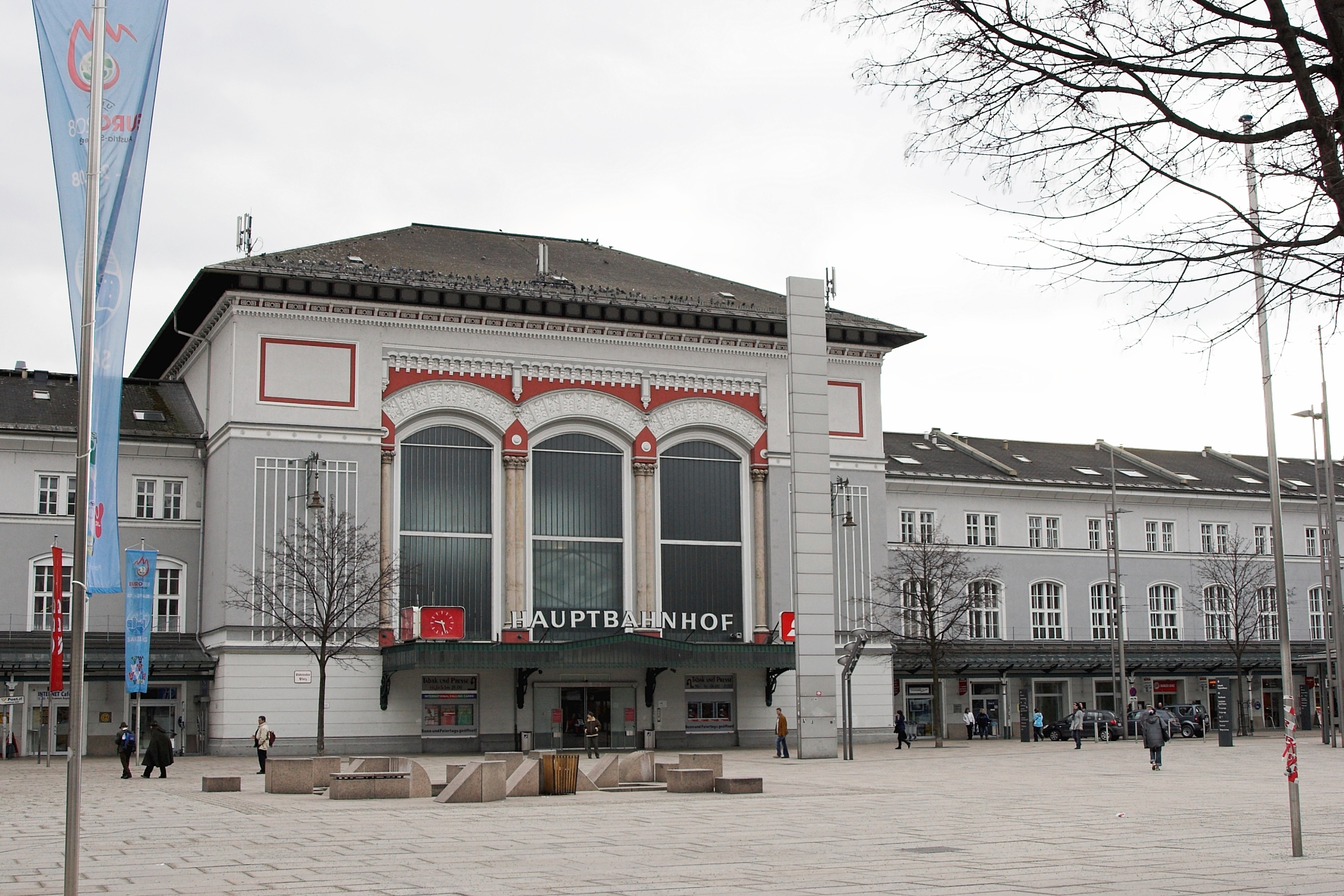
Listed station building of Salzburg Hauptbahnhof

The station was opened simultaneously with the Rosenheim–Salzburg railway and the Austrian Western Railway in 1860.

Salzburg Hauptbahnhof developed into an international transport hub. It is now used by about 25,000 passengers daily.

=== Viaduct near Traunstein ===
The viaduct that crosses the Traun was initially not built over the river. Instead the river was diverted under the viaduct prior to its formal opening on 19 July 1859. The viaduct is 105 metres long and has five 30 metre-high arches. The bridge is made of nagelfluh (a variety of conglomerate) with decorated keystones. Ten people were killed during its construction.

== Current operations ==
Frequent local passenger services, long-distance passenger services run over the line.

The entire route is served by trains from Munich to Salzburg, which are operated by the Bayerische Regiobahn. In addition, a train pair runs on the line from Rosenheim to Traunstein. The section between Freilassing and Salzburg is also served by two variations of line 3 of the Salzburg S-Bahn with different routes, together providing services at 20-minute intervals. Individual Regionalbahn services to/from Mühldorf run between Freilassing and Salzburg. An extension of line S 2 from Salzburg Hauptbahnhof to Freilassing is planned.

Train class	Route	Frequency	Operator
M	Munich – Rosenheim – Traunstein – Freilassing – Salzburg	Hourly	Bayerische Regiobahn
RB	(Landshut –) Mühldorf – Freilassing – Salzburg	Individual services	Südostbayernbahn
	Bad Reichenhall – Freilassing – Salzburg – Golling-Abtenau – (Saalfelden)	Hourly	
	Freilassing – Salzburg – Golling-Abtenau – Schwarzach-St. Veit	Hourly	

EuroCity (EC) trains run between Frankfurt am Main and Salzburg via Rosenheim every two hours with stops at Prien, Traunstein and Freilassing. Since the 2008 timetable change, these trains continue beyond Salzburg to Graz and Klagenfurt in alternation. In between the EC trains, Railjet services from Munich to destinations in Austria and Hungary pass through without stopping between Munich and Salzburg. In addition, a pair of InterCity trains, named Königssee runs each day between Hamburg and Berchtesgaden via the line.

The Austrian Federal Railways (ÖBB) operate long-distance trains on the Vienna–Salzburg–Innsbruck–Vorarlberg route on the line between Salzburg and Kufstein via Landl/Rosenheim every two hours non-stop.

In the 2008 timetable a pair of Railjet services ran for the first between Budapest, Vienna and Munich.

Line	Route	Frequency
IC 26	Königssee: Hamburg-Altona – Hamburg – Hannover – Göttingen – Kassel-Wilhelmshöhe – Fulda – Würzburg – Augsburg – München Ost – Rosenheim – Berchtesgaden	1 train pair
EC 32	Wörthersee: (Münster (Westf) –) Dortmund – Essen – Düsseldorf – Cologne – Koblenz – Frankfurt – Mannheim – Heidelberg – Stuttgart – Augsburg – Munich – Rosenheim – Salzburg – Klagenfurt	1 train pair
EC 60	Karlsruhe – Stuttgart – Ulm – Augsburg – Munich – Rosenheim – Salzburg	1 train pair
EC 62	Frankfurt – Heidelberg – Stuttgart – or Saarbrücken – Mannheim – Stuttgart – Ulm – Augsburg – Munich – Rosenheim – Salzburg (– Klagenfurt / Graz / Linz)	Every 2 hours
RJ 90	Munich – (Rosenheim –) Salzburg – Vienna – Budapest	Every 2 hours
RJ	(Zürich – Bregenz – Bludenz –) Innsbruck – Salzburg – Vienna – Vienna Airport (– Budapest)	Hourly

== Future ==
This route is part of the TEN project No. 17 "Magistrale for Europe" from Paris to Budapest. This should lead to further upgrading projects. This is being promoted especially by the ÖBB as it expects the journey time between Salzburg and Munich to be reduced to 1 hour instead of 1.5 hours today.

== Use in media ==
In 2024, British video game developer Dovetail Games released a 3D recreation of the route as downloadable content for the popular rail simulation game Train Sim World. A number of notable locomotives from Deutsche Bahn and other railway operators are featured in the route and players can choose from a variety of freight and passenger services to drive.
