= Bergen (Oberbayern) station =

Railway station in Bavaria, Germany

Bergen (Oberbayern)
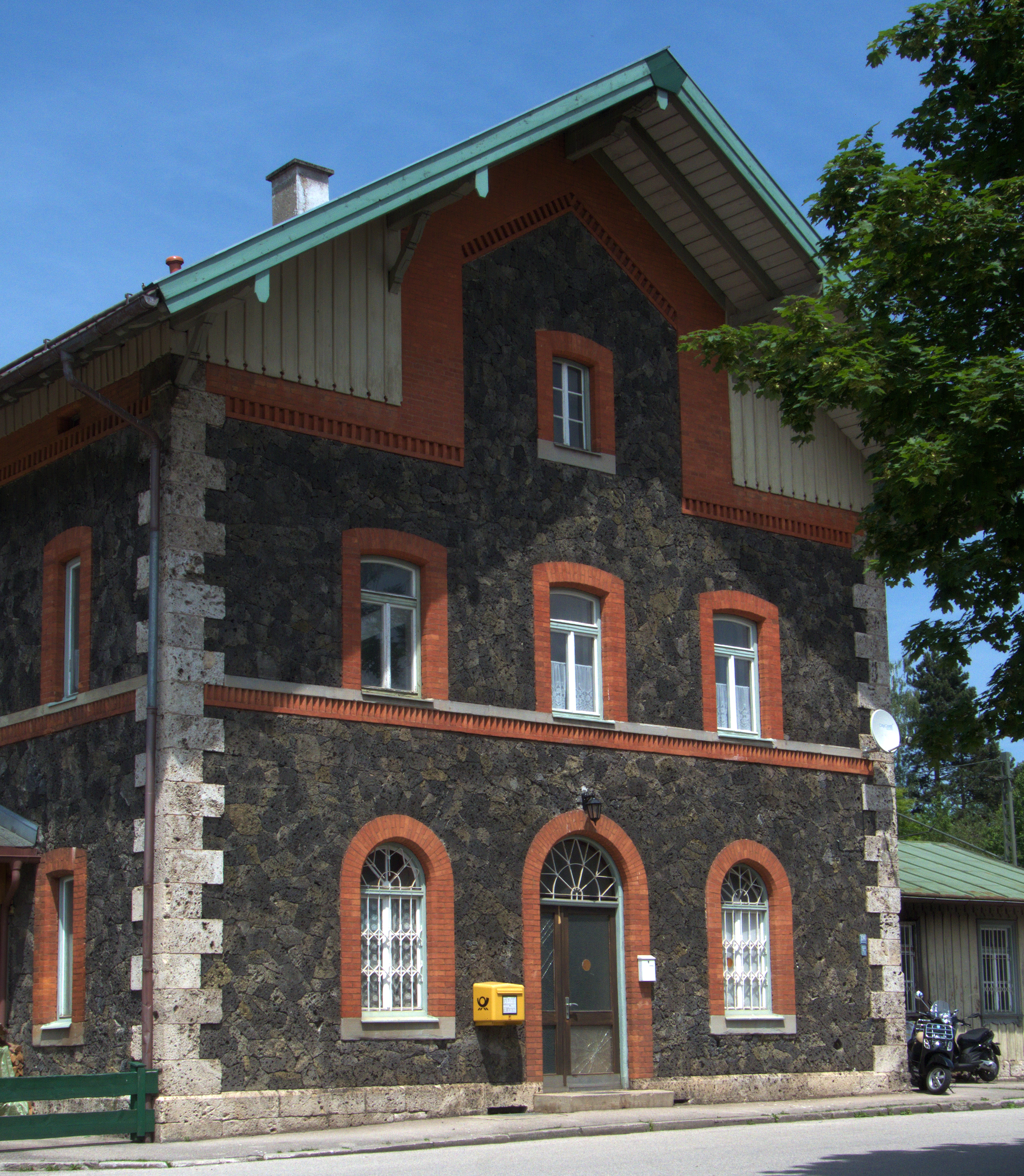

General information
- Location: Bahnhofstraße 198; 83346 Bergen; Bavaria; Germany
- Coordinates: 47.8252°N 12.5929°E
- Owner: Deutsche Bahn
- Operator: DB Netz; DB Station&Service
- Line: Rosenheim–Salzburg railway
- Platforms: 2 side platforms
- Tracks: 2
- Train operators: Bayerische Regiobahn

Other information
- Station code: 498
- DS100 code: MBE
- IBNR: 8000888
- Category: 6
- Website: www.bahnhof.de

History
- Opened: 7 May 1860; 166 years ago

Services
Preceding station		Following station
Übersee towards München Hbf	RE 5	Traunstein towards Salzburg Hbf
Location
- Location within Bavaria Location within Germany Location within Europe

Bergen (Oberbayern) station is a railway station in the municipality of Bergen, located in the Traunstein district in Bavaria, Germany.
