= Bernau am Chiemsee =

- Municipality
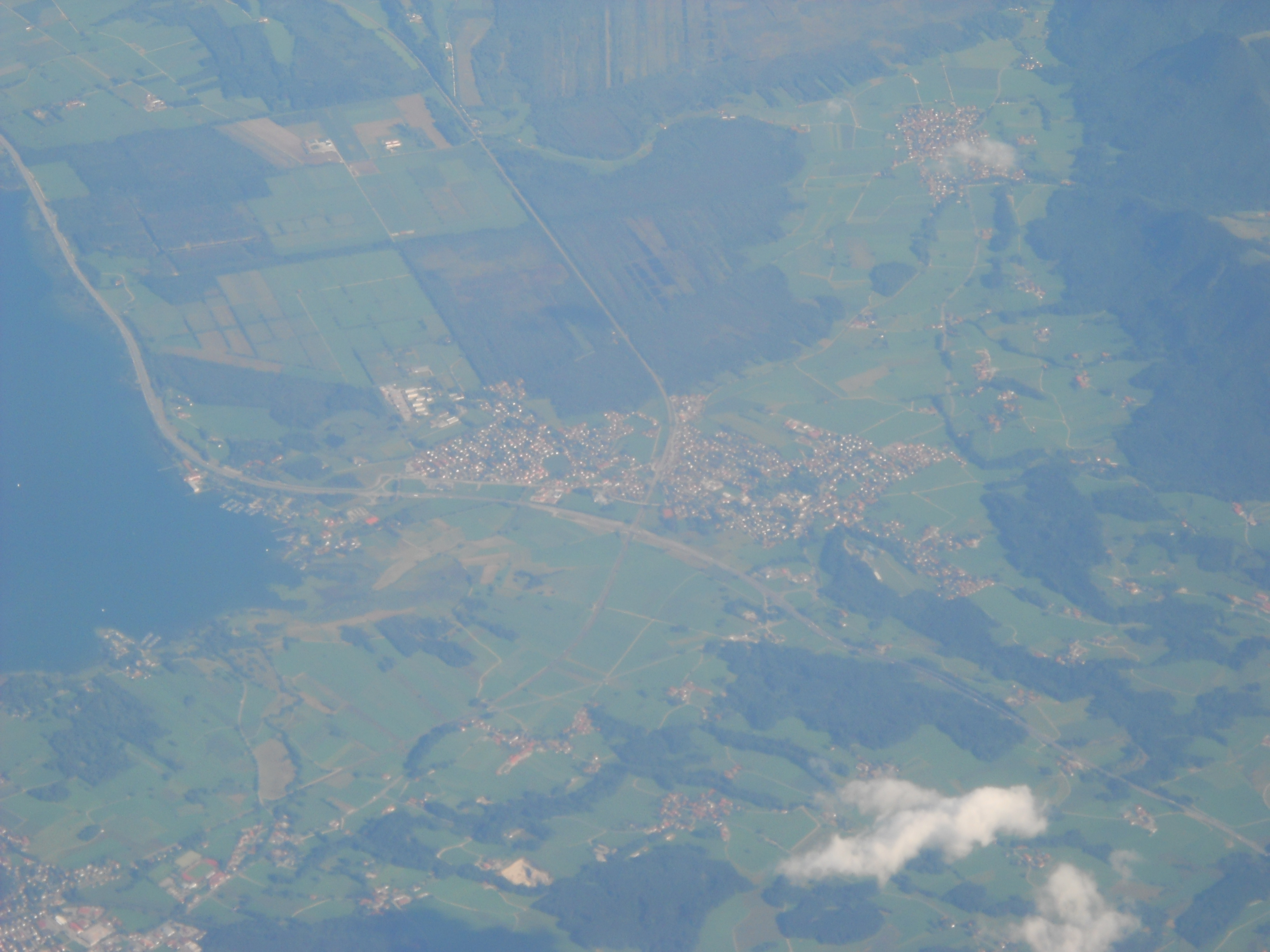
- Aerial view

- Coat of arms

- Location of Bernau am Chiemsee within Rosenheim district
- Interactive map of Bernau am Chiemsee
- Location within Germany Location within Bavaria
- Coordinates: 47°49′N 12°22′E
- Country: Germany
- State: Bavaria
- Admin. region: Oberbayern
- District: Rosenheim

Government
  - Mayor (2020–26): Irene Biebl-Daiber (CSU)

Area
  - Total: 26.68 km^{2} (10.30 sq mi)
- Elevation: 544 m (1,785 ft)

Population (2025-12-31)
  - Total: 6,901
  - Density: 258.7/km^{2} (669.9/sq mi)
- Time zone: UTC+01:00 (CET)
  - Summer (DST): UTC+02:00 (CEST)
- Postal codes: 83233
- Dialling codes: 08051
- Vehicle registration: RO
- Website: www.bernau-am-chiemsee.de

Bernau am Chiemsee (German pronunciation: [bɛʁˈnaʊ ʔam ˈkiːmzeː], lit. 'Bernau on the Chiemsee'; officially Bernau a.Chiemsee) is a municipality in the district of Rosenheim in Upper Bavaria, Germany. It is also categorized as a Luftkurort.

== Geography ==
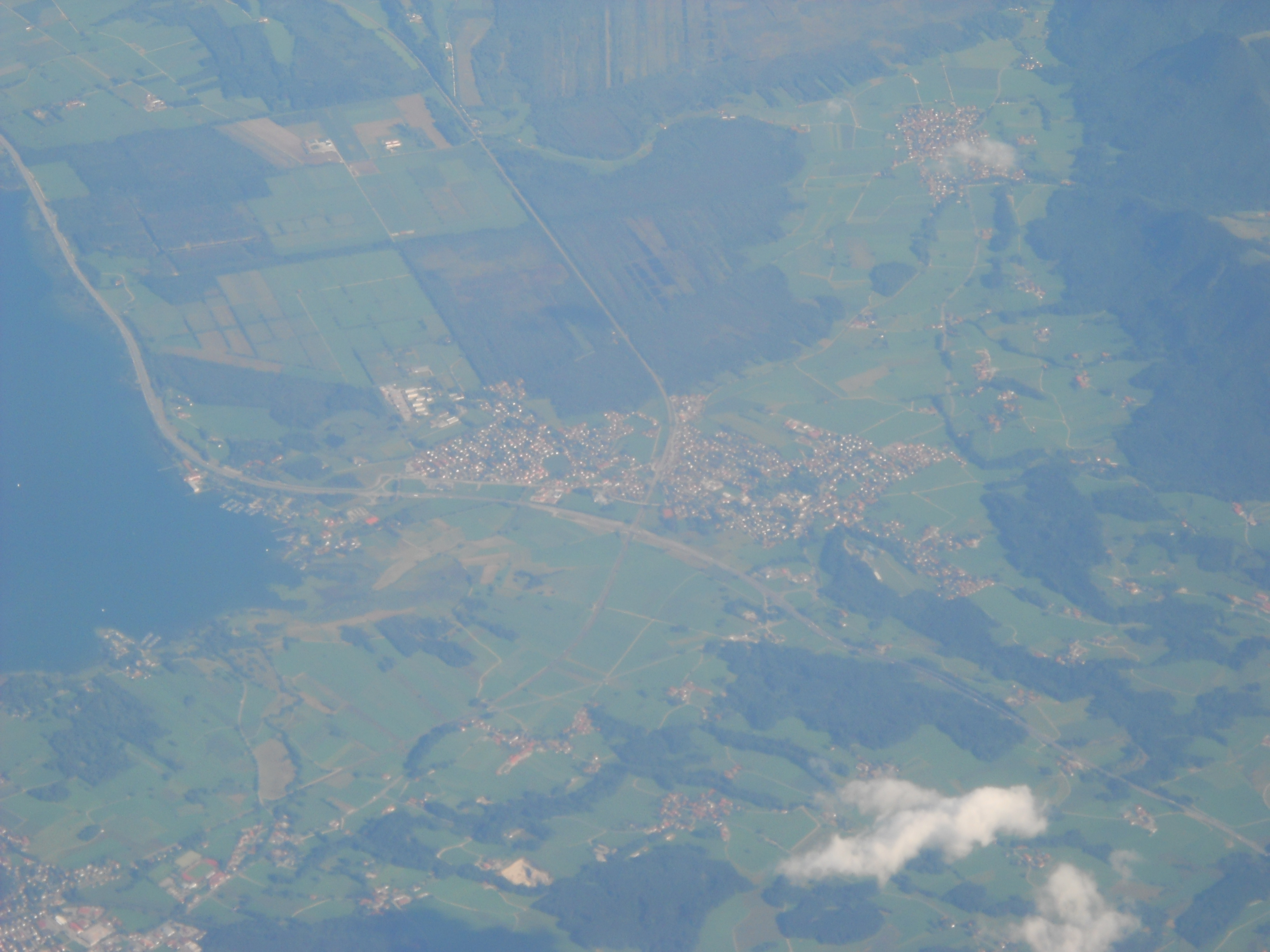
Bernau am Chiemsee (centre of picture)

=== Topography ===
Bernau lies in the Chiemgau area at the southwestern bank of the Lake Chiemsee. Bernau is close to the Bundesautobahn 8 Munich–Salzburg and the Rosenheim–Salzburg railway. In the south are the Chiemgau Alps (German: Chiemgauer Alpen) with the prominent Kampenwand. The east is bogland, where peat was harvested. An old railway station for the transport of peat in the bog Kendlmühlfilzen is a reminder of this. Rosenheim is 24 km away, Munich 83 km, Kufstein 35 km, Traunstein 26 km, Salzburg 58 km, and Reit im Winkl 25 km.

At its shore, Bernau features a beach, boat hire, and mooring facilities for the Chiemsee-Schifffahrt; it is possible to reach the Herreninsel directly.

The cycling route (Uferrundweg) around Lake Chiemsee also passes through one of Bernau's districts, Felden.

=== Neighbouring municipality ===
Neighbouring municipalities are Übersee, Grassau, Aschau, Frasdorf, and Prien.

=== Community organisation ===
The municipality has two Gemarkungen: Bernau a. Chiemsee and Hittenkirchen. The municipality Bernau am Chiemsee has 38 districts:

- Abling
- Aufing
- Bach
- Bergham
- Bernau am Chiemsee
- Bichling
- Chiemseepark Felden
- Eichet
- Farbing
- Gattern
- Giebing
- Gröben
- Hafenstein
- Heroldsöd
- Hittenkirchen
- Hitzelsberg
- Hötzing
- Irschen
- Kothöd
- Kraimoos
- Moos
- Neumühle
- Osterham
- Reit
- Reitham
- Rudersberg
- Schleipfen
- Schörging
- Steinbach
- Stocka
- Stötten
- Unterbergham
- Weisham
- Westerham
- Wiedendorf
- Gut Lambelhof
- Wiesen
- Wimpasing

== History ==
=== Before the establishment of the municipality ===
During ancient Rome, Bernau was a popular resort for soldiers because of its convenient and healthy location. The outlines of a villa rustica were found here. This indicates the existence of a Roman bath. A Roman tombstone was also found.

Bernau am Chiemsee belonged to the counts of Preysing and was part of the Electorate of Bavaria. Bernau was a part of Hohenaschau, which was granted Blutgerichtsbarkeit. Today's municipality came into being during the administrative reforms in Bavaria of 1818 (Gemeindeedikt von 1818).

The Emperor Maximilian I. stayed in Bernau during his campaign against Burg Marquartstein in October 1504. This has been noted on a board at the inn Gasthof zum alten Wirt.

=== Incorporation ===
On 1 May 1978, parts of the dissolved municipality Hittenkirchen were incorporated.

=== Population development ===
Between 1988 and 2018, the municipality grew from by 1907 inhabitants.

Population development
Year	1840	1900	1925	1950	1961	1970	1987	1991	1995	2001	2005	2010	2015
Population	843	1089	1474	3606	3788	3792	4859	5802	6176	6612	6727	7129	6811

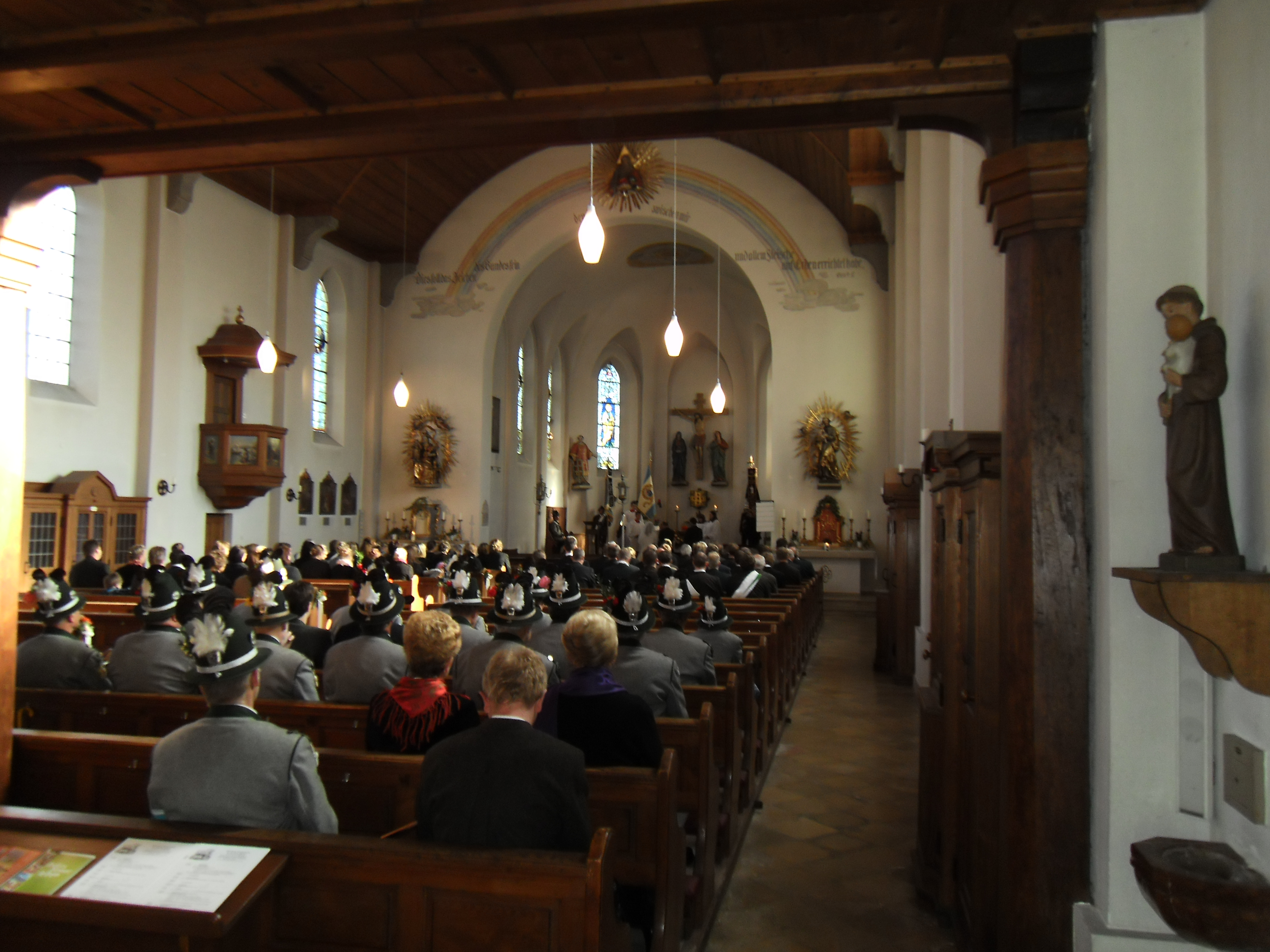
Interior view of the church St. Laurentius during Sunday mass

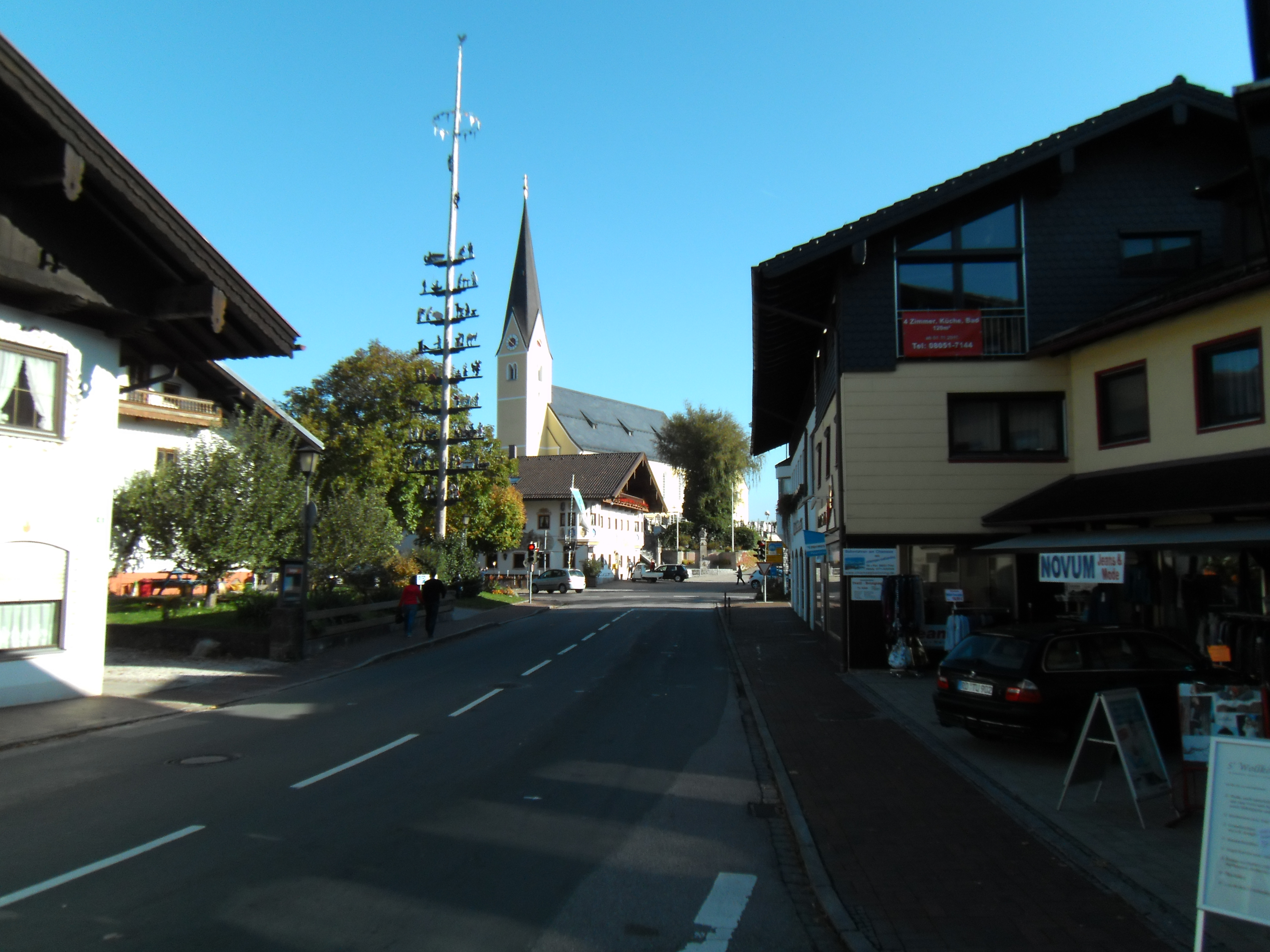
Road in the centre of the village. The church St. Laurentius can be seen in the background

== Religion ==
The majority of the population in Bernau is Catholic. Services take place in the church St. Laurentius, which belongs to the Catholic parish of Bernau. The district Hittenkirchen has its own village church.

== Politics ==
=== Municipal council ===
Twenty honorary council members, together with the full-time mayor, make up the municipal council of Bernau am Chiemsee. The composition of this council following the local elections in 2014 is as follows:

	2014	2008	2002
Total of seats	20	20	20
CSU	8	10	10
Bernauer Liste	3	3	3
SPD	2	2	3
Greens	4	2	-
Wählergruppe ÜWG	2	2	2
Wählergruppe WMG	1	1	2

=== Mayor ===
Term	1. Mayor	2. Mayor	3. Mayor
2002–2014	Klaus Daiber (CSU)		
2014–2020	Philipp Bernhofer (Bernauer Liste)	Gerhard Jell (CSU)	Alexander Herkner (SPD)
since 2020	Irene Biebl-Daiber (CSU)	Gerhard Jell (CSU)	Franz Prassberger (ÜWG)

=== Local authority finances ===
In 2010, the municipal tax revenue was 4,745,000 euros, 1,676,000 euros of which were trade tax revenues.

=== Coat of arms and flag ===
Blazon: "In Silber über einem mit zwei durchgehenden silbernen Wellenbalken belegten blauen Dreiberg eine grüne Hausmarke, bestehend aus Kreuzkopfvierfußschaft mit erhöhter linker Mittelkreuzstrebe, Vierfuß hintenendig gekreuzt." (Silver, at the bottom a blue trimount, with two continuous silver waves going through the mount and above a green House mark consisting of a complex pattern.)

The arms belong to the innkeeper family Seiser, who have played an important role in the municipality since the end of the 15th century. The green colour has been freely selected. The trimount alludes to the Aschau coat of arms, which Bernau used to belong to; however, it also stands for the mountains in the Chiemgau area. The waves stand for the position of the town close to Lake Chiemsee. The coat of arms was designed by the engineer and designer Hugo Decker and was approved by the Bavarian Ministry of the Interior in 1956.

The flag is striped green, white, and blue.

== Economy and infrastructure ==
=== Economy ===
In 2010, according to government statistics, there were 281 employees who were subject to social insurance in the manufacturing industry and 338 employees subject to social insurance in the trade and traffic industry in Bernau. 590 employees subject to social insurance were employed in other economic sectors. In the manufacturing sector, there were three businesses, and in the building industry proper, eight. Furthermore, there were 57 farms with an agricultural land of altogether 1394 hectares, of which 1250 hectares were fields not used for agriculture.

=== Traffic ===
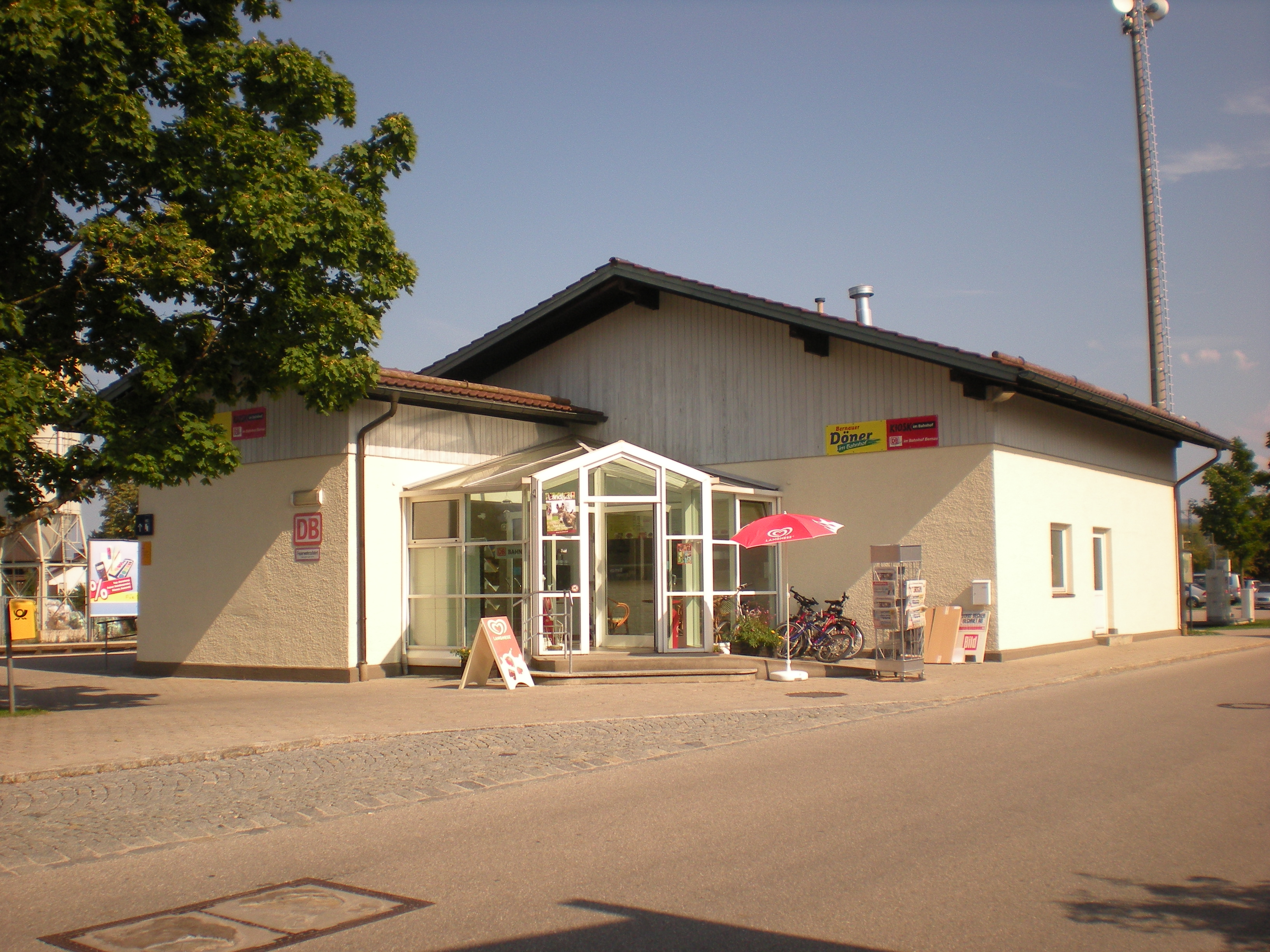
Train station building Bernau a Chiemsee

- Rail traffic: Bernau am Chiemsee is one of the stops on the Rosenheim–Salzburg railway route, which is part of the main route Munich–Salzburg–Vienna. The train station has two train tracks and two side platforms, and was opened together with the railway route on 7 May 1860. In 2003, the train station building was modernized and now also includes a kiosk.
- Bus traffic: Bernau am Chiemsee is serviced by two bus links that are part of the regional traffic company Regionalverkehr Oberbayern. There is a connection to Aschau im Chiemgau, Sachrang, Prien am Chiemsee, Marquartstein, and Reit im Winkl via the bus routes 9502 and 9505.There is also the Chiemseeringlinie, a bus service with a cycle compartment that drives to designated stops in towns and villages around Lake Chiemsee during the summer. During this time, the Chiemsee-Schifffahrt also moors in Felden.
- Road traffic: In the northwest lies Autobahnanschlussstelle 106 Bernau of the Autobahn A 8 that crosses the Bundesstraße 305.

=== Education ===
In 2010, there were the following educational institutions:

- Three nurseries with 200 places.
- A primary school.

The school teaches grades 1-4, and there are two school classes for each grade.

=== Sport ===
There are sports facilities in Bernau for many disciplines. These include football, basketball, tennis, paddleball, volleyball, boccia, beach volleyball, beach soccer, ballooning, biking in the mountains, downhill, skiing, snowboarding and other winter sports, as well as hiking, climbing, Nordic walking, ice skating, squash, windsurfing, surfing, sailing, and water sports. Furthermore, there are three shooting clubs.

Bernau is home to one of the biggest indoor tennis courts in Germany, as well as one of two places in Germany for the new tennis discipline called Padel. There is also a DAV indoor climbing gym. There are beach volleyball and beach soccer courts at the lake. The lake also offers many opportunities for different water disciplines. Ballooning is offered in the district of Hittenkirchen, as well as in Bernau itself.

=== Tourism ===
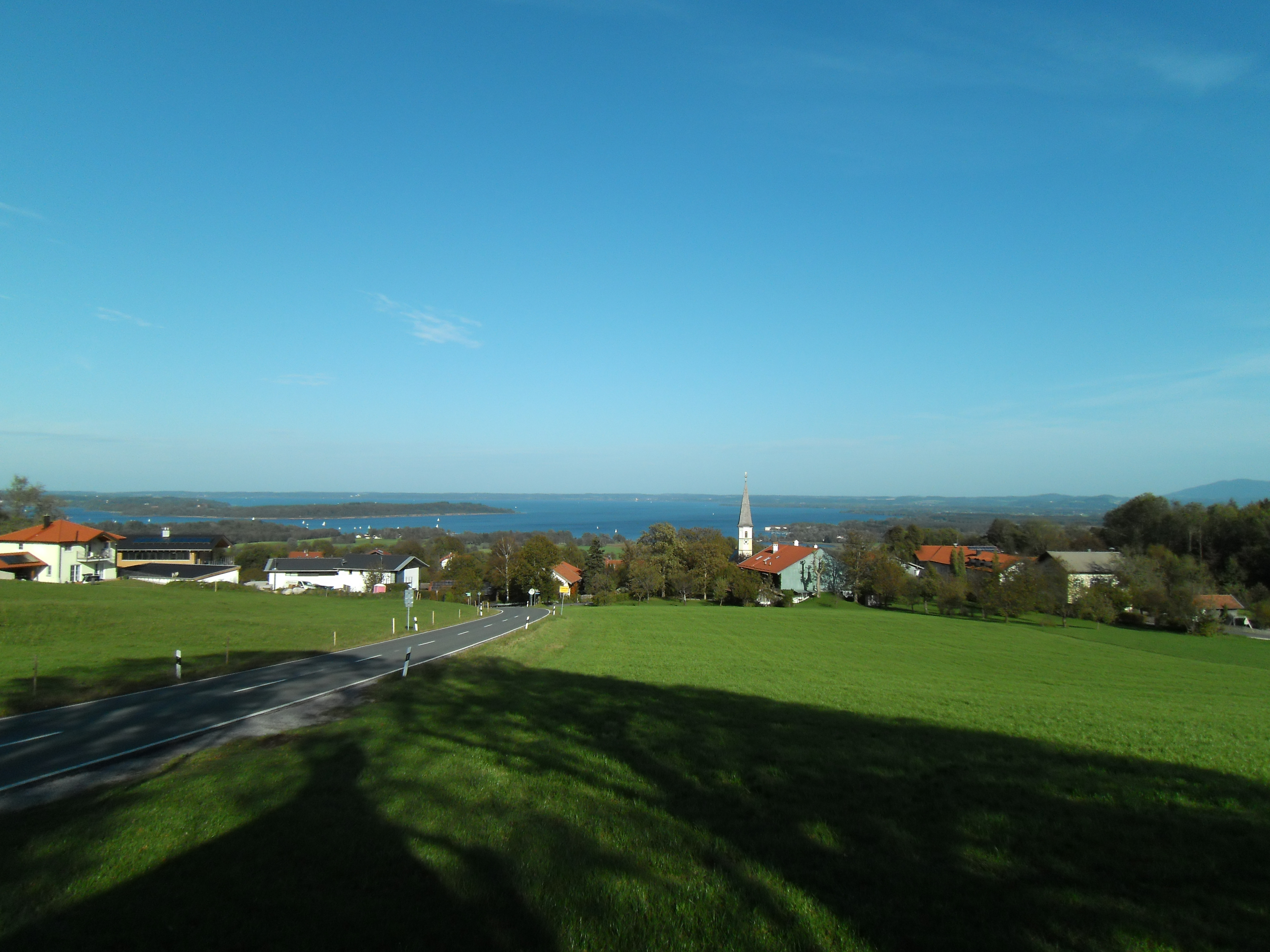
View of settlement Hittenkirchen and the lake Chiemsee with its islands Herrenchiemsee

Bernau is a popular place for tourists due to its tranquility and its proximity to large cities such as Munich and Salzburg. Popular tourist spots apart from the Lake Chiemsee are the Bonnschlössl, the guesthouse Gasthof alter Wirt and the Torfbahnhof, an old rail station for the transportation of peat. There are also many typical Bavarian mountain pastures that still run livestock.

There is a tourist information office in the Chiemseepark Bernau-Felden.

=== Wellness and rehabilitation clinic ===
- Medical-Park Chiemsee, a recognized rehabilitation clinic with the specialist areas of orthopedics, traumatology, and sports medicine. The clinic is housed in a building that used to be an old Autobahn service area building called Rasthaus am Chiemsee.

== Landmarks ==
- Parish Church St. Laurentius
- Medieval church St. Bartholomäus im Ortsteil Hittenkirchen
- Hotel Bonnschlössl
- Water tower in Bergham
- War memorial im Hittenkirchen
- Statues "Griechische Weisen" in the schoolyard of the primary school in Bernau
- Pillar "Seisersäule" at the entrance to the Catholic parish church St. Laurentius
- Museum of the old peat train station Torfbahnhof
- The prison (Justizvollzugsanstalt Bernau) can accommodate about 850 inmates and is one of the largest prisons in Bavaria
- Wayside chapel in Aufing
- Forest chapel near Hitzelsberg
- Place of prayer Mariengrotte in Kraimoos
- Chapel near Kalvarienberg/Hitzelsberg

== Notable people ==
- Hugo Decker (1899–1985), member of the German Bundestag MdB (Bavaria Party), Parliamentary leader of the Föderalistische Union (1951–1953)
- Raimund Eberle (1929–2007), jurist and chief administrator (Regierungspräsident) of Upper Bavaria from 1975 to 1994
- Wilfried Klaus (born 1941), actor

== Gallery ==
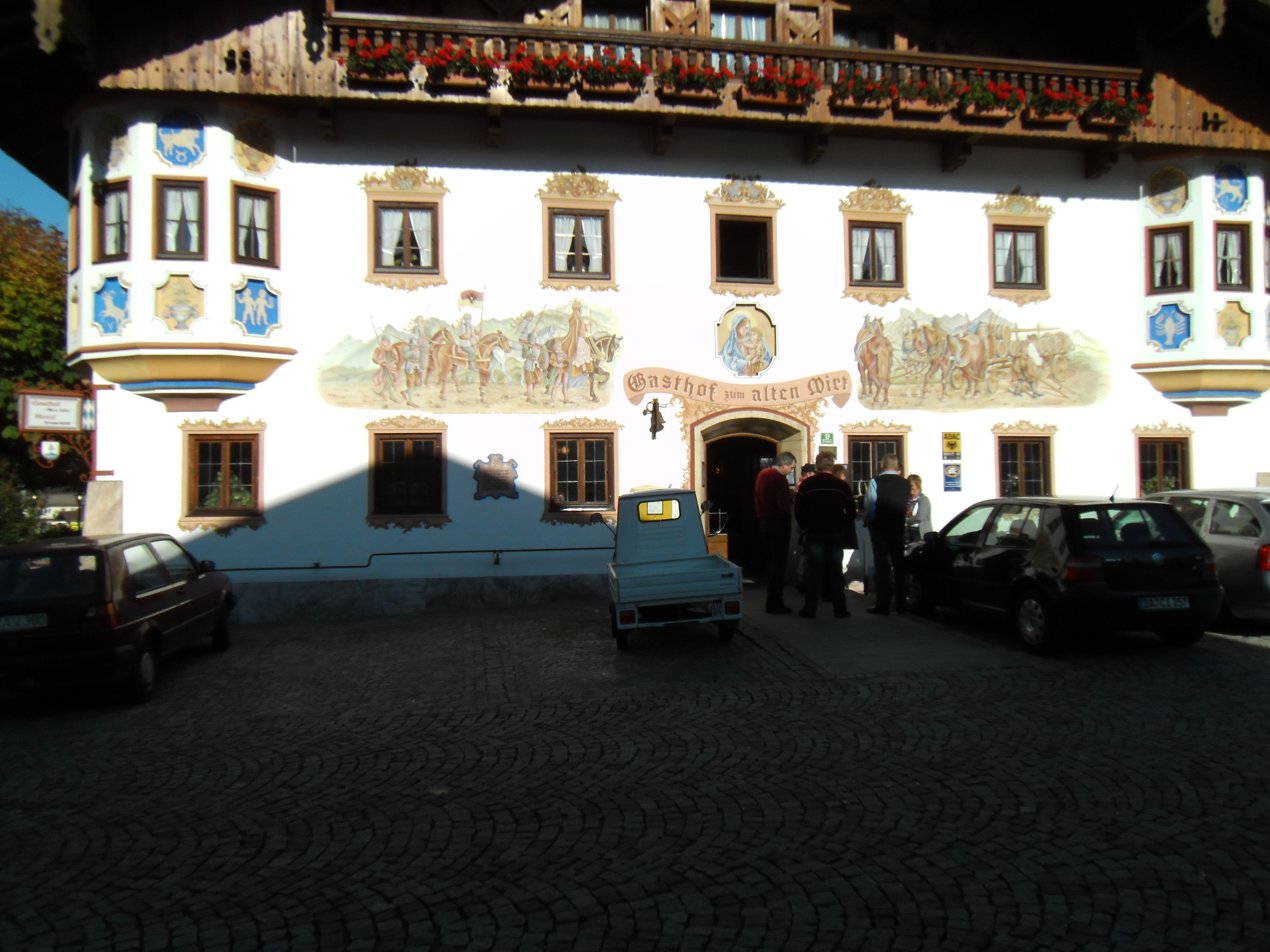
Traditional guesthouse Gasthof zum alten Wirt in the heart of the village

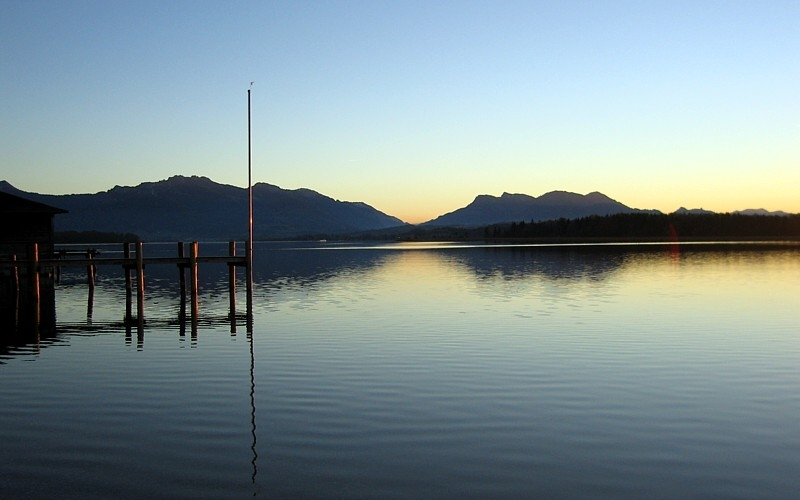
View from Urfahrn of Bernau across the lake Chiemsee

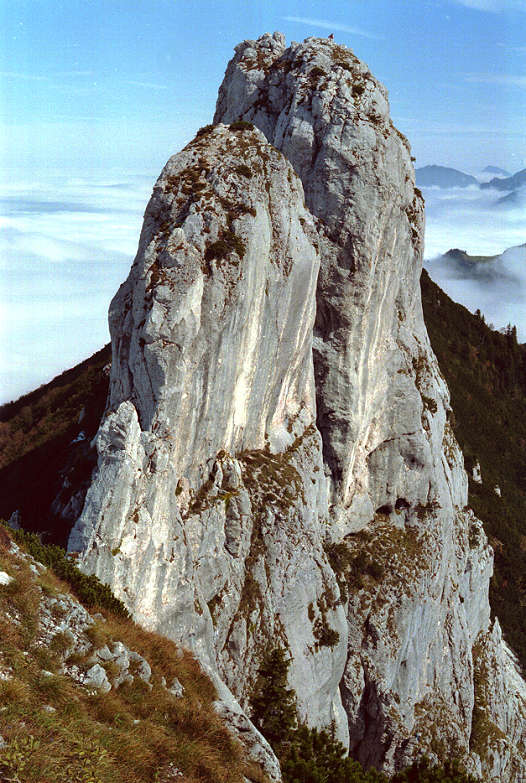
Mountain close to Bernau, the 1664m high Kampenwand
