= Kampenwand =

Mountain in Bavaria, Germany

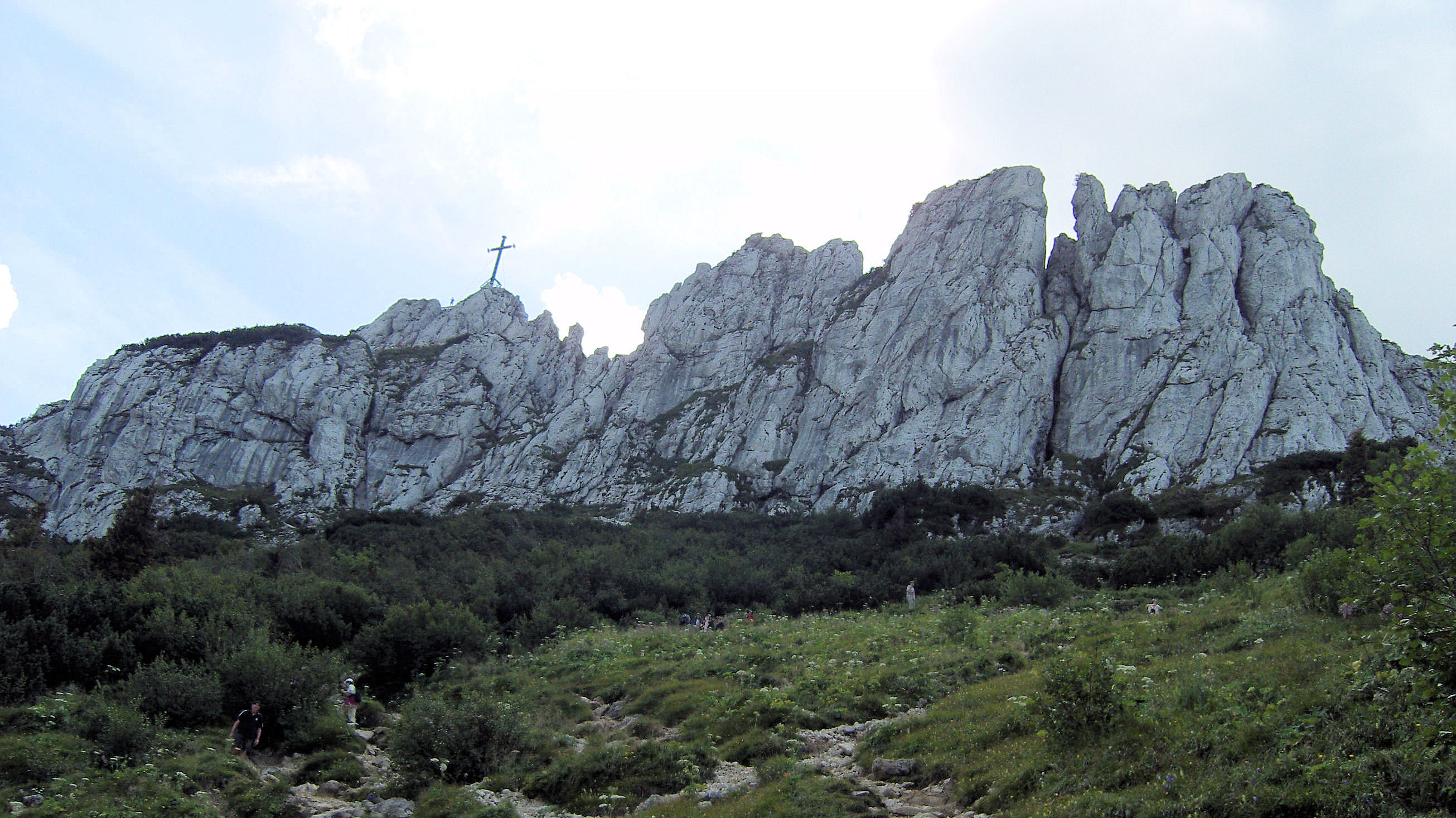
- Kampenwand

Highest point
- Elevation: 1,669 m (5,476 ft)
- Prominence: 589 m (1,932 ft)
- Coordinates: 47°45′21″N 12°22′04″E

Geography
- Location within Alps
- Location: Bavaria, Germany
- Parent range: Chiemgau Alps

Kampenwand is a mountain of Bavaria, Germany. It features the tallest summit cross of the Bavarian alps. Its peaks are:

- Kampenwand Hauptgipfel 1669 m
- Kampenwand Ostgipfel 1664 m mit dem 12 m hohen Gipfelkreuz
- Hochplatte 1587 m
- Scheibenwand 1598 m
- Bauernwand 1580 m
- Sonnwendwand 1512 m
- Sulten 1486 m
- Gedererwand 1351 m
- Haindorfer Berg 1122 m
- Adersberg 991 m
