= Übersee =

- Municipality
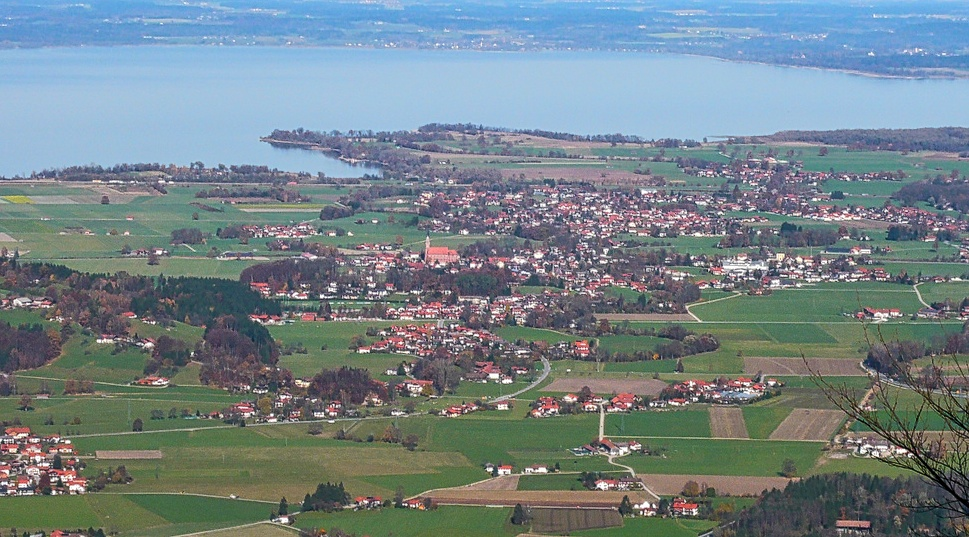
- Übersee at Chiemsee

- Coat of arms

- Location of Übersee within Traunstein district
- Interactive map of Übersee
- Location within Germany Location within Bavaria
- Coordinates: 47°49′N 12°28′E
- Country: Germany
- State: Bavaria
- Admin. region: Oberbayern
- District: Traunstein

Government
  - Mayor (2021–27): Herbert Strauch

Area
  - Total: 30.53 km^{2} (11.79 sq mi)
- Elevation: 525 m (1,722 ft)

Population (2025-12-31)
  - Total: 5,042
  - Density: 165.1/km^{2} (427.7/sq mi)
- Time zone: UTC+01:00 (CET)
  - Summer (DST): UTC+02:00 (CEST)
- Postal codes: 83236
- Dialling codes: 08642
- Vehicle registration: TS
- Website: www.gemeinde-uebersee.de

Übersee (German pronunciation: [ˈyːbɐzeː]) is a municipality and a village in the rural district of Traunstein in upper Bavaria, Germany. It lies on the south shore of lake Chiemsee.

== Geography ==
=== Geographic Location ===
Übersee is located in the Chiemgau, more precisely at the northern entrance to the Achental (Achen Valley), the valley of the river Tiroler Achen which has its origin in Tyrol, Austria. Said river also marks most of the eastern border between Übersee and Grabenstätt, before flowing into lake Chiemsee. The area around the river mouth belongs to Übersee and is a recreational breeding area for local bird species.

The village lies mostly on flat land, with the only major elevation being the Westerbuchberg, one of the southernmost parts of Übersee.

The second stream flowing through the village is the Überseer Bach which has its origin in Grassau, just south of Übersee. The smaller stream marks an east-bound border between Übersee, Bernau and the Chiemseemoos, while still flowing entirely within the area of Übersee.

Through the neighbourhood of Feldwies, Übersee is connected to the shore of lake Chiemsee, the largest lake in Bavaria.

=== Neighbourhoods ===
Übersee is divided into 36 small neighbourhoods:

- Albern
- Almau
- Almfischer
- Anger
- Angerling
- Aumühle
- Bachham
- Baumgarten
- Chiemseemoos
- Damberg
- Engelstein
- Feldwies
- Frenthal
- Gassen
- Gießen
- Gries
- Gröben
- Heinrichwinkel
- Heißanger
- Hinterbichl
- Hocherlach
- Luft
- Moosen
- Neuwies
- Reisermann
- Schließpoint
- Seethal
- Stegen
- Stegenhäuser
- Übersee
- Vorderbichl
- Wasen
- Weidach
- Wessen
- Westerbuchberg
- Windschnur

=== Neighbouring Municipalities ===
Neighbouring municipalities (clockwise from the north-east) are: Grabenstätt, Staudach-Egerndach, Grassau and Bernau am Chiemsee.

== History ==
Übersee was very committed to agriculture for most of its recorded existence. After World War II ended, tourism became increasingly important and let the village thrive. The Sommerfrischler – as they are called in the local dialect – were middle to upper class people from across Germany who spent their vacation at lake Chiemsee in the summer months during the time of the economic boom after WWII. Furthermore, the village is connected to major transit roads between Munich and Austria, Italy and the Balkans. Functioning partly as an "entrance to the Achental", Übersee is a good starting point for visitors who wish to explore both the lakeside and the mountains.

In the past, Übersee suffered many times from floods of nearby river Tiroler Ache. This threat was minimized by building a dam in the 1930s. Still to this day, drained bits of ancient river beds can be found throughout the village.

== Culture ==
The house of late German impressionist painter Julius Exter (1863–1939) is used today as a seasonal art exhibition and artesanal market for fellow local artists. Generally, Übersee – because of its location amidst the alpine foothills and lake Chiemsee – attracted a number of artists and painters in the past which are now commonly referred to as Chiemseemaler (Chiemsee Painters). Exter is considered to be one of the first and the most famous one, being in close contact with Franz Marc and having opened a painting school in his house.

The new-folk/techno/brass-rock band LaBrassBanda has its origins in Übersee, where singer Stefan Dettl founded the band in 2006.

In the Chiemgau region, Übersee is famous for the Roman Catholic St. Nikolaus church was built by munich Architect Joseph Elsner in a neo-gothic style. Because of its impressive size compared to the relatively small village (with a Tower over 75 meters tall), it is often referred to as the "Achental-Cathedral".

=== Chiemsee Summer ===
From 1995 through 2017, an annual music festival has been taking place in Übersee. The "Chiemsee Summer" (formerly known as "Chiemsee Reggae Summer") festival attracted up to 40,000 people every late August and offered visitors a variety of genres such as Reggae, Rock, Metal, Pop and Electro. In 2017, Chiemsee Summer was hit by a severe thunderstorm amidst evening performances, causing mass panicking and leaving several attendants injured. Chiemsee Summer was put on hiatus since 2018, although organizers are working on a new artistic concept.

== Economy ==
Because of its location between lake Chiemsee and the alpine foothills and its connection to a major highway and railway between Munich and Salzburg, tourism plays a very big role in Übersee's economy, the most important group being daily-tourists from the regions of Munich and northern Austria. Particularly in Summer, many local residents offer rooms and flats for travellers, a practice that has been quite common in the area ever since the 1950s' economic boom.

Übersee's northernmost neighbourhood, Feldwies, offers a lakeshore-beach park with various bars and extensive grastronomy. In the summertime, the local boatline Chiemsee-Schifffahrt connects the beach to Frauenchiemsee island.

Also, agriculture has not disappeared and is still practiced, often in traditionally-oriented methods, as well as fishing.

== People associated with the village ==
- Walter L. Brendel (1923–2013), painter, worked and lived in Feldwies
- Christian Ehrig (*1964), journalist and foreign correspondent, born in Übersee
- Julius Exter (1863–1939), impressionist painter, close friend of Franz Marc, worked and lived in Übersee in his final years
- Franz Sales Gebhardt-Westerbuchberg (1895-1969), painter, worked in the Chiemgau region
- Klaus Steiner (*1953), politician (former bavarian state-senator), born in Übersee
- Georg Einerdinger (1943–2015), actor, born in Übersee
