= Selma Des Coudres =

German painter

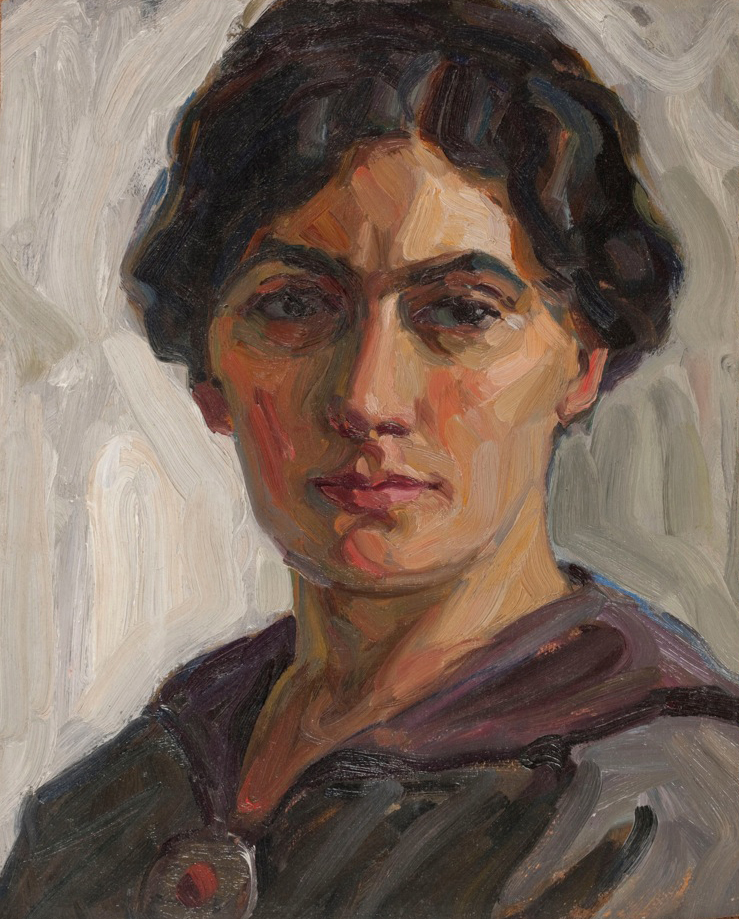
Self-portrait (Private collection; used by permission. Date unknown)

Selma Des Coudres (born Selma Plawneek (Latvian: Zelma Pļavniece); 2 January 1883, Riga — 4 March 1956, Fürstenfeldbruck) was a Latvian-born German painter. Her style mixes elements of Art Nouveau, Expressionism and Japonism.

== Biography ==
Her father was a wood and lumber wholesaler. He died in 1891, shortly after a disastrous fire destroyed all his possessions. Her mother had received drawing lessons as a girl, and encouraged Selma in her plans to become an artist.

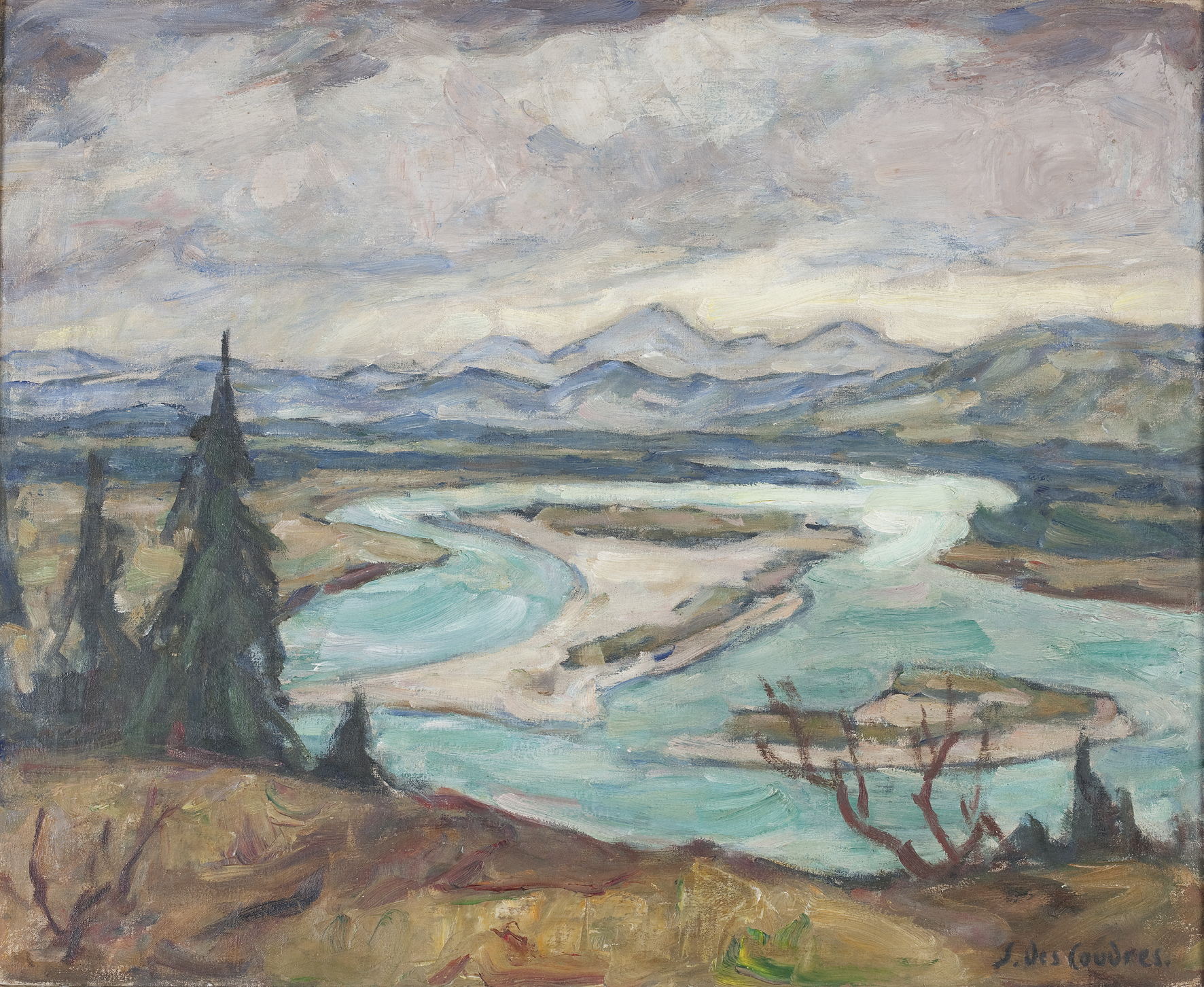
View of the Isar River (Private collection, used by permission)

She enrolled in the private painting school operated by the Baltic German painter, Elise Jung-Stilling. In 1903, the Imperial Academy of Arts awarded her a diploma that enabled her to become a teacher in a middle school for girls. While teaching, she also took private lessons from Janis Rozentāls and studied landscape painting with Vilhelms Purvītis.

Her first work was as an illustrator; providing drawings in the Art Nouveau style for Kiefern im Schnee (Pines in the Snow), a collection of poetry and fairy tales. From 1908 to 1912, she regularly provided illustrations for the Jahrbuch für bildende Kunst in den Ostseeprovinzen. She also participated in several exhibits at the Rigaer Kunstverein and the new Latvian National Museum of Art. The museum's Director, Wilhelm Neumann, purchased several of her linocuts for its collection.

In 1909, she received a scholarship from the City of Riga: established by Georg Wilhelm Timm to help young artists. The money enabled her to study in Munich with Max Doerner and in Dachau with Adolf Hölzel. In 1910, she went to Chiemsee for lessons with Julius Exter. Back in Munich, she made lifelong friends with Joachim Ringelnatz, who called her a "very gifted, poor painter". His autobiography was dedicated to her.

Until 1914, she moved between Riga and Munich. During the war, she travelled extensively, giving exhibitions. Finally, in 1919, she decided to settle in Fürstenfeldbruck, which had been an artists' colony since 1900. It was there she met the painter, Adolf Des Coudres, and they were married in 1921. They made a very notable pair, as she was twenty years younger than him and much taller. The marriage was short, however, as he died late in 1924.

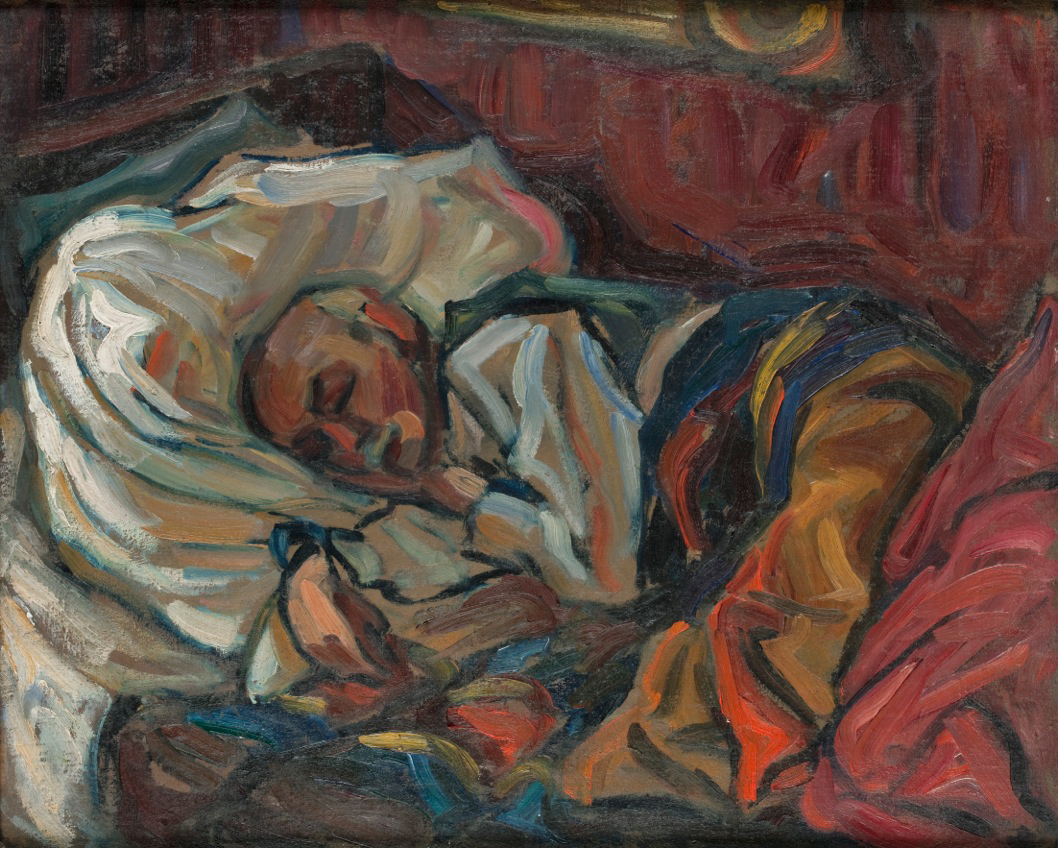
Her husband, Adolf, Sleeping (Private collection, used by permission)

Not long after his death, she and other local artists created the Kunstverein Fürstenfeldbruck. For a time, she served on the Board of Directors. Having lost most of her wealth due to the raging hyperinflation, she settled in a small cottage nearby. At that time, she began to concentrate on portraits and floral still-lifes; catering to provincial tastes in order to make a living.

She died in 1956 and is buried next to her husband at the old cemetery in Emmering.
