= Deutschordenskirche (Frankfurt am Main) =

- Deutschordenskirche in Frankfurt
- German: Deutschordenskirche
- Deutschordenskirche
- 50°6′23″N 8°41′18″E
- Location: Brückenstraße 7 Frankfurt am Main
- Country: Germany
- Denomination: Roman Catholic
- Website: www.deutschordenskirche.de

History
- Status: Convent church
- Dedication: Mary

Architecture
- Functional status: Active
- Style: Gothic, Baroque
- Years built: c. 13th century (original building)
- Completed: 1309; 1960s (restoration)

Administration
- Province: Cologne
- Diocese: Limburg
- Parish: Dompfarrei St. Bartholomäus Frankfurt

The Deutschordenskirche in Frankfurt am Main is a Roman-Catholic church in the district of Sachsenhausen. Unlike most historical churches in Frankfurt's city-center which are owned by the city of Frankfurt, Deutschorden is property of the Teutonic Order which maintains it as part of its convent at Frankfurt. Next to the Deutschordenskirche is the Deutschordenshaus, an attached convent-building.

== History ==
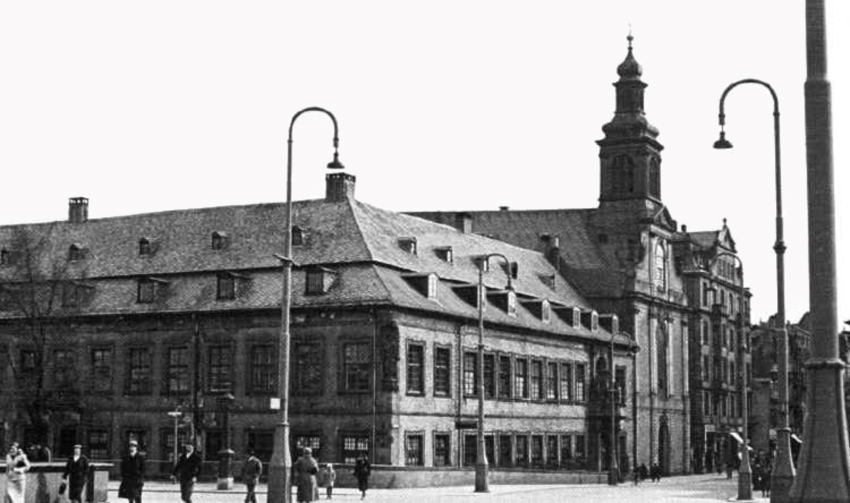
The Deutschordenshaus, prior to the bombing raids of 1943

In 1221 Emperor Frederick II gifted several estates in Frankfurt to the Teutonic Order, including a church. In 1307 the Order began construction of a new church, dedicated to the Virgin Mary in 1309.

In the wake of the Reformation, Catholic Masses were suppressed in Frankfurt. Despite Catholicism being reallowed in the city after the Augsburg Interim the convent did not recover as the vast majority of the city's population had become Protestant.

During the Thirty Years' War the building complex was occupied by Swedish forces between 1631 and 1635.

In 1707 the old Deutschordenshaus was torn down and replaced with a baroque reconstruction. The church itself was renovated in the baroque style in 1751.

During the Secularization of 1803 Frankfurt's churches, except for Deutschorden, were claimed by the Free City of Frankfurt. Deutschorden instead became the property of Frederick Augustus, Duke of Nassau. At the Congress of Vienna the Deutschordenshaus and the church were handed over to the House of Habsburg that restituted them to the Teutonic Order in 1836. However, in 1886 the church was transferred to the Catholic community of Frankfurt for pastoral tasks. Following the transfer, the church was renovated in the Gothic style.

On October 4, 1943 Deutschorden was hit during a bombing raid. The church was badly damaged and the Deutschordenshaus burned down almost completely, including the studio of the artist Karl Friedrich Lippmann. The convent's ruins were bought by the Teutonic Order in 1958 and reconstruction began in 1963. In 1965 the Grand Master of the Teutonic Order Marian Tumler rededicated the repaired Deutschordenskirche and Deutschordenshaus.

== Current situation ==
Between 2012 and 2020 the convent was the center of the novice-formation of the Teutonic Order.

Due to a parish-restructuring Deutschorden ceased to be an independent parish in 2014 and become part of the general Frankfurt-city-parish. In addition to the German congregation, Deutschorden also offers Tridentine Masses.

Part of the Deutschordenshaus also hosts Frankfurt's Museum of Icons, which holds a collection of Orthodox icons. The museum forms the eastern end-point of Frankfurt's Museumsufer.
