= Adolf Des Coudres =

German landscape painter

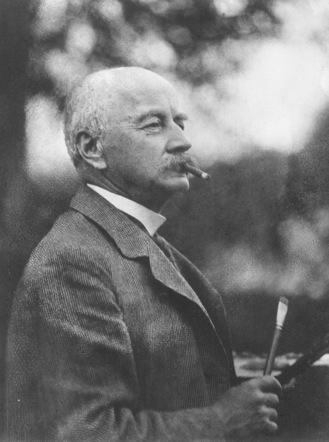
Adolf Des Coudres (date unknown)

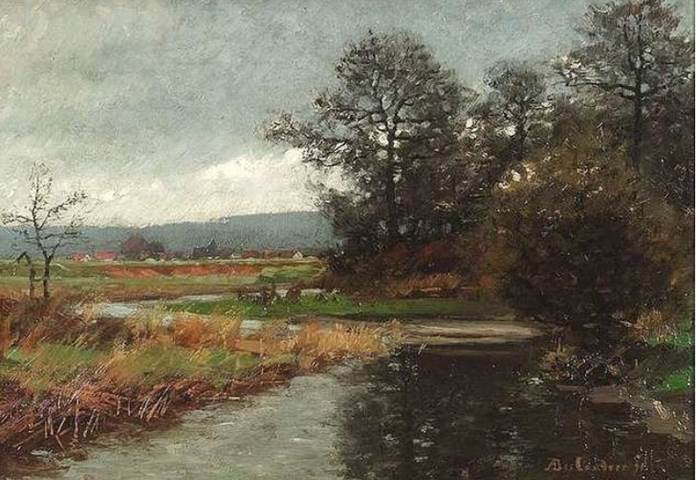
Autumn Floodplain Under a Cloudy Sky

Adolf Des Coudres (2 June 1862 – 21 September 1924) was a German landscape painter.

== Biography ==
The Des Coudres family originated in Switzerland. Des Coudres was born in Karlsruhe, where his father, the painter Ludwig des Coudres, was a professor at the Academy of Fine Arts. Despite this, he did not support his son's desire to become a painter.

It was only after his father's death in 1878 that he was able to begin his studies. In 1881, he enrolled at the Academy, where he studied with Gustav Schönleber, who had a profound influence on his style. He remained there until 1890, making several stays at artists' colonies; especially the one at Gutach.

After completing his studies, he worked as a freelance painter until 1909, participating in exhibitions at Baden-Baden and Munich, including several showings at the Glaspalast, as well as Karlsruhe. He also helped establish a private painting school for women. He often visited Holland; staying at the artists' colony in Ahrenshoop.

In 1910, he moved to Fürstenfeldbruck, where he built a villa and studio. He participated in creating the first art exhibition there in 1914. His sister died the following year and, three years later, he left his villa to take an apartment in town. In 1921, he married the painter Selma Plawneek, who was twenty years his junior. He died in 1924.
