= Johann Heinrich Jung =

German author (1740–1817)

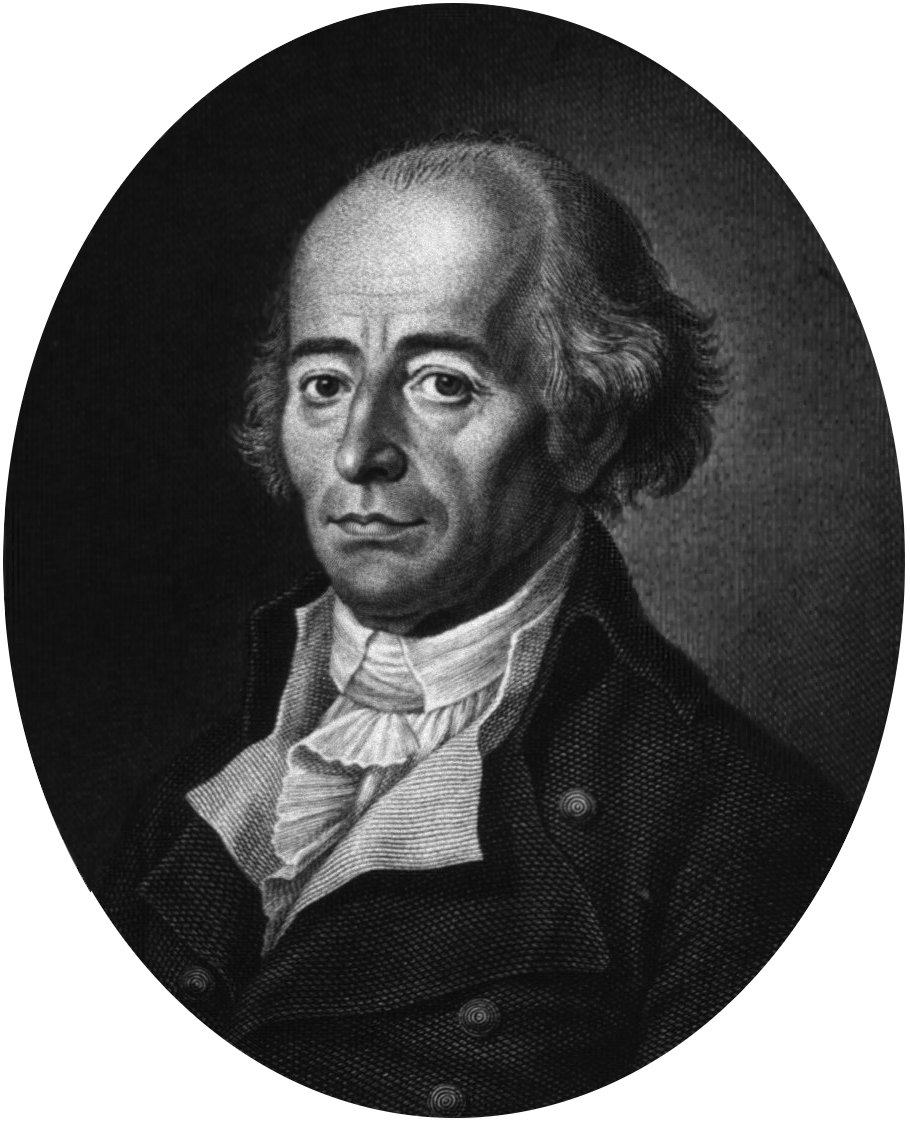
Johann Heinrich Jung

Johann Heinrich Jung (12 September 1740, in Grund – 2 April 1817, in Karlsruhe), better known by his assumed name Heinrich Stilling, was a German author. He is often called by both surnames as "Jung-Stilling".

== Life ==
He was born in the village of Grund (now part of Hilchenbach) in Westphalia. His father, Wilhelm Jung, a schoolmaster and tailor, was the son of Eberhard Jung, charcoal burner, and his mother was Johanna Dorothea née Fischer, the daughter of Moritz Fischer, a poor clergyman and alchemist. Jung became at his father's wish a schoolmaster and tailor.

In 1742 his mother died, leaving his father distraught, so he was raised by his grandparents and aunts.

After various teaching appointments, as early as the age of 14, he went in 1768 to study medicine at the University of Strasbourg. There he met Goethe, who introduced him to Herder. In the second volume of his autobiography Dichtung und Wahrheit. Aus meinem Leben, Goethe discusses Jung.

In 1772 Jung settled at Elberfeld as physician and oculist, and soon became celebrated for cataract operations. He performed over 3,000 cataract operations during his lifetime. In 1778 he accepted an appointment as lecturer on agriculture, technology, commerce and veterinary medicine in the newly established College of Cameralism (Hohe Kameral-Schule) at Kaiserslautern, a post which he continued to hold when the school was absorbed into the University of Heidelberg in 1784. His wife, Christine, died in 1781.

In 1787, he was appointed professor of economic, financial and statistical studies at the University of Marburg. In 1803, he resigned his professorship and returned to Heidelberg, where he remained until 1806, when he was granted a pension by Charles Frederick, Grand Duke of Baden, and moved to Karlsruhe, where he resided until his death in 1817.

He was married three times, and fathered thirteen children. His granddaughter Elise von Jung-Stilling was painter and founder of private painting school in Riga.

=== Chiliasm ===
He has been described as "an able defender of Christianity against German rationalism [and] an ardent and eminent Universalist." A Professor Tholuck wrote in 1835 that the doctrine of Universalism "came particularly into notice through Jung-Stilling, that eminent man who was a particular instrument in the hand of God for keeping up evangelical truth in the latter part of the former century, and at the same time a strong patron to that doctrine."

Jung-Stilling was a "religious separatist" working with Mennonite and Moravian Brethren communities. His writings on the Book of Revelation were popular

Schopenhauer referred to Jung-Stilling in his example of how rational humans, unlike irrational animals, are prone to error. People can use, according to Schopenhauer, abstract ideas to make other people do anything they wish: "In the year 1818 seven thousand Chiliasts moved from Württemberg into the neighborhood of Ararat, because the new kingdom of God, specially announced by Jung-Stilling, was to appear there."

== Works ==
His autobiography Heinrich Stillings Leben, from which he came to be known as Stilling, is the principal source about his life. Jung's acquaintance with Goethe at the University of Strasbourg ripened into friendship, and it was by his influence and assistance that Jung's first work, Heinrich Stillings Jugend. Eine wahrhafte Geschichte, was put to paper and published (without Jung's knowledge) in 1777. Considered an important precursor of the Bildungsroman, the book concealed Jung's actual surname and gave him the invented name "Stilling", which may derive from the characterization of German Pietists as "the still people in the countryside" ("die Stillen auf dem Lande"). His early novels reflect the Pietism of his early surroundings. A complete edition of his numerous works was published in fourteen volumes at Stuttgart in 1835–1838. An excerpt from his autobiography eventually contributed to the works of the Brothers Grimm, as the story "The Old Grandfather and his Grandson"

There are English translations by Samuel Jackson of the autobiography Leben (1835) and of the Theorie der Geisterkunde (London, 1834, and New York, 1851); and of Theobald, or the Fanatic, a religious romance, by the Rev. Samuel Schaeffer (1846).

The original German Der graue Mann (1795) was translated into Russian as Угроз Световостоков (Ugroz svetovostokov) (1806), which was translated from Russian into English by Daniel H. Shubin, and published as Menace Eastern-Light, The Man in the Grey Suit (2002).

== List of works ==
·1775 Die Schleuder eines Hirtenknaben gegen den hohnsprechenden Philister, den Verfasser des Sebaldus Nothanker

·1776 Die große Panacee wider die Krankheit des Religionszweifels

·1776 Theodicee des Hirtenknaben als Berichtigung und Vertheidigung der Schleuder desselben

·1777 Heinrich Stillings Jugend

·1778 Stillings Jünglingsjahre

·1778 Stillings Wanderschaft

·1779 Geschichte des Herrn von Morgenthau

·1781 Die Geschichte Florentins von Fahlendorn

·1781 Der Volkslehrer, the first of a monthly magazine of the same name

·1783 Leben der Theodore von der Linden

·1784 Theobald oder die Schwärmer

·1787 Blicke in die Geheimnisse der Naturweisheit; denen Herren von Dalberg Herdern und Kant gewidmet as a part of Intelligenzblat für Hessen

·1788 Erzehlungen des Bauernfreundes

·1789 Rede über den Werth der Leiden, gehalten im Kreise einiger vertrauten Freunde am 30sten Geburtstage seiner Gattin, den 20. Jun. 1789 read aloud

·1790 Stillings häusliches Leben

·1790 Lehrbuh der Cameral-Praxis

·1791 Methode den grauen Staar auszuziehen und zu heilen, - nebst einem Anhang von verschiedenen andern Augenkrankheiten und der Cur=Art derselben

·1794 Das Heimweh

·1795-1816 Der graue Mann, eine Volksschrift

·1795-1801 Szenen aus dem Geisterreiche

·1796 Das Heimweh finished

·1796 Schlüssel zum Heimweh

·1799 Die Siegsgeschichte der christlichen Religion in einer gemeinnüzigen Erklärung der Offenbarung Johannis

·1803 Der christliche Menschenfreund in Erzählungen für Bürger und Bauern

·1804 Heinrich Stillings Lehr-Jahre

·1808 Theorie der Geister=Kunde

·1814-1815 Erzählungen

== See also ==
- Nicolaus Zinzendorf
