= Harada Naojirō =

Japanese painter (1863–1899)

- 原田 直次郎
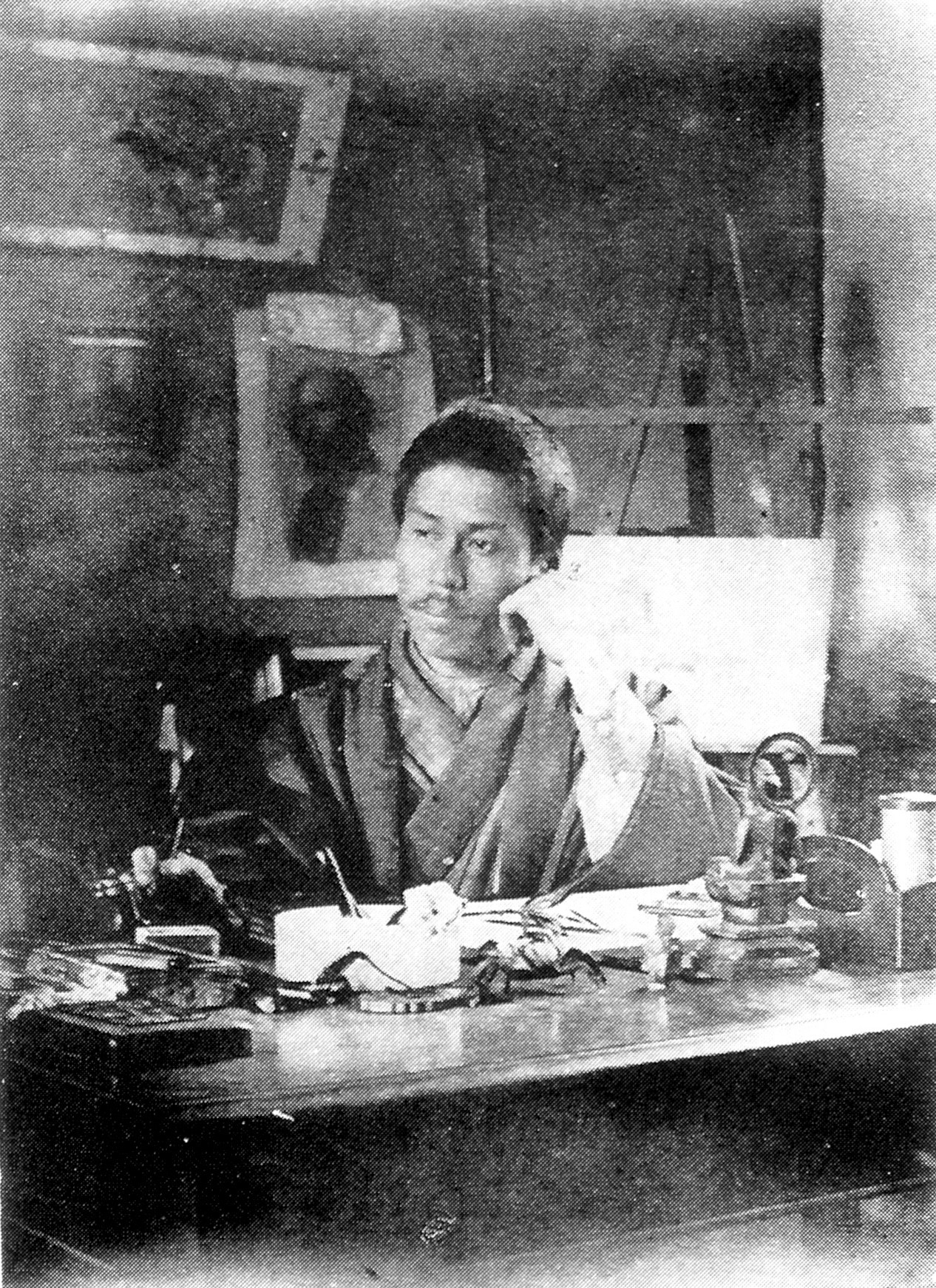
- Naojirō, c. 1885
- Born: 12 October 1863; Edo, Japan
- Died: 26 December 1899 (aged 36)
- Movement: Yōga

Harada Naojirō (原田 直次郎; 12 October 1863 – 26 December 1899) was a Japanese painter who specialized in the yōga (Western) style. He was a friend of the novelist Mori Ōgai and served as the model for the protagonist in Ōgai's short story A Sad Tale (1890).

== Life and career ==
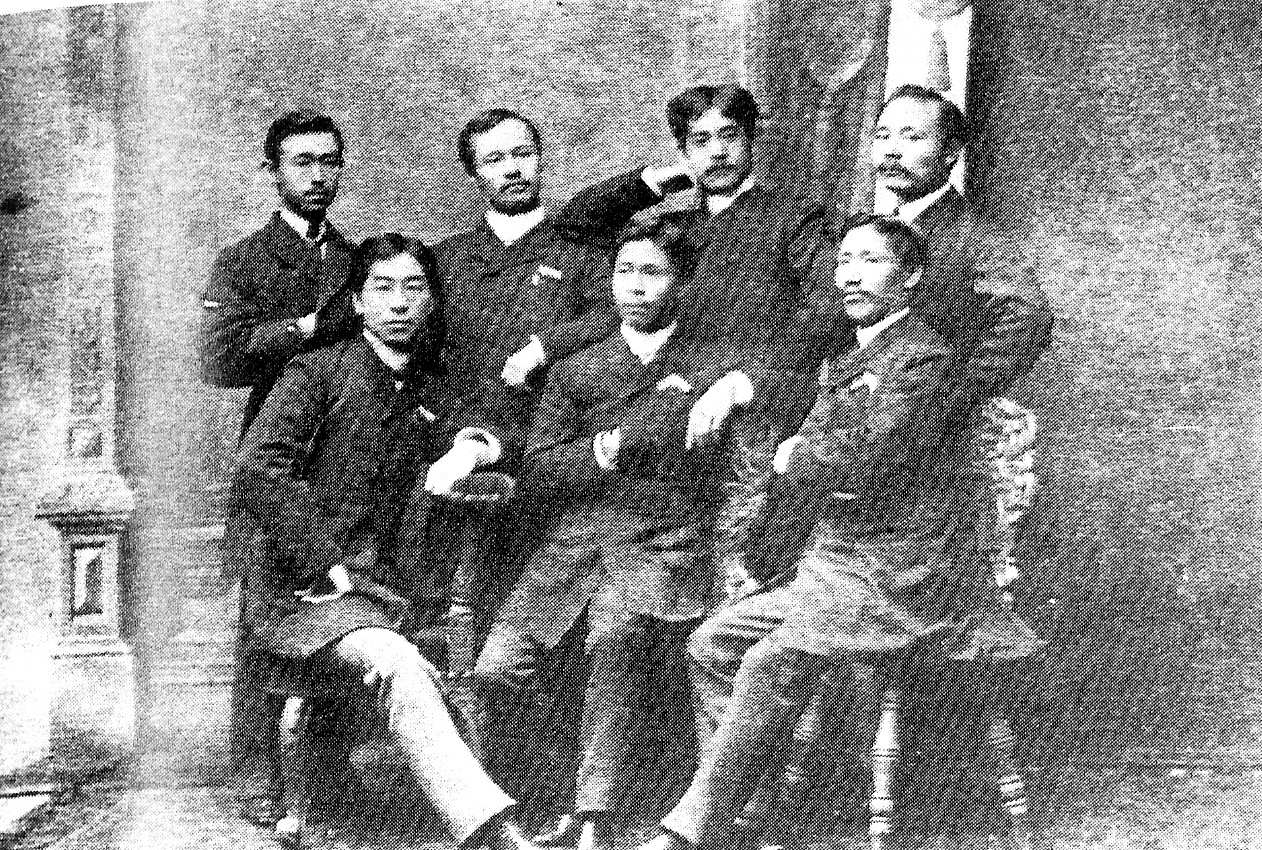
Harada and Mori Ōgai in Munich

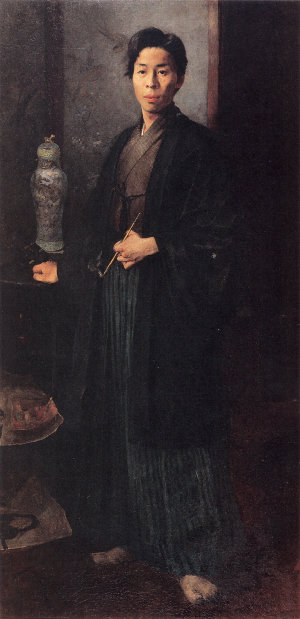
Portrait of a Japanese, portrait of Harada by Julius Exter

=== Early life ===
Harada Naojirō was born in the Koishikawa area of Edo (modern Tokyo) on 12 October 1863. (Note: The 30th day of the 8th month of the year of Bunkyū by the Japanese calendar) He was the second son of Ai and Harada Ichidō. Ichidō worked for the military government at the Bansho Shirabesho, where foreign books were studied and translated. He wanted his son to learn French, and to this end had Naojirō enrolled at the Osaka Kaisei School in 1870 and at the Tokyo School of Foreign Languages in 1873, from where he graduated in 1881. That August he married Ōkubo Sada. (Note: 大久保さだ) From the age of eleven Harada began studying yōga, or Western-style painting under Yamazaki Nariaki, and from 20 under Takahashi Yuichi, who at the time was the most prominent yōga painter in Japan.

=== Study in Europe ===
Harada moved to Germany in February 1884, where he studied for two years at the Academy of Fine Arts. In Munich. He apprenticed under the Austrian painter Gabriel von Max, a friend of his brother Toyokichi's. While in Munich he befriended the German painter Julius Exter and the Japanese writer Mori Ōgai, who had been dispatched to Germany by the Ministry of War of Japan. In 1886, he began to live with a woman named Marie who worked in a café on the ground floor of the building he lodged in. Around that October he guided Viscount Hamao Arata around, who was on a government tour of inspection abroad. On 22 November, he left a pregnant Marie and toured Switzerland, Venice, and Rome, meeting Japanese painters there, and audited classes at the École des Beaux-Arts in Paris. He left France in May the next year.

=== Later life ===
Returning to Japan in 1887, Harada opened a private school for western-style painting in his own home. He became ill around 1893 and died in 1899 at the age of 36.

== Works ==
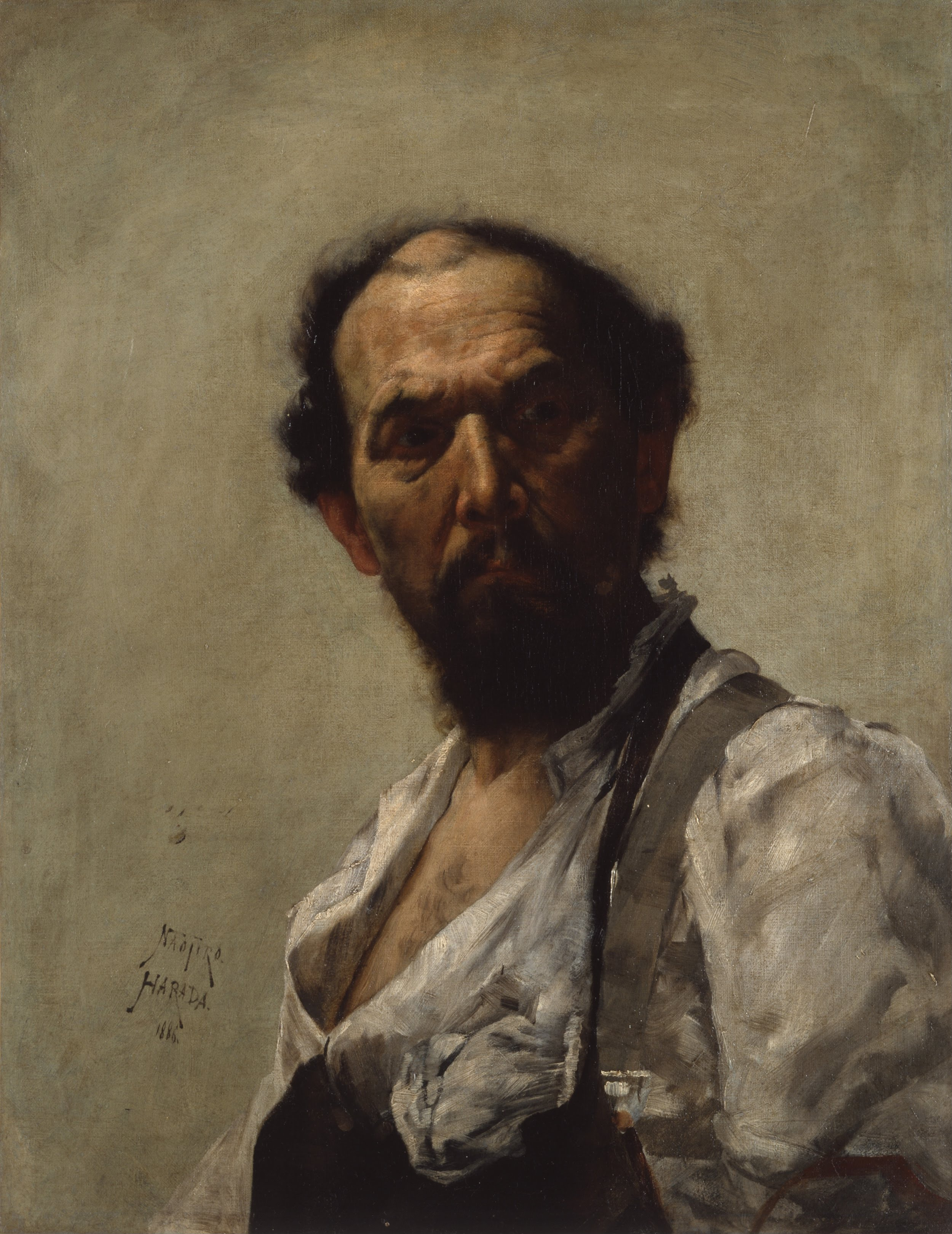
Shoemaker, 1886

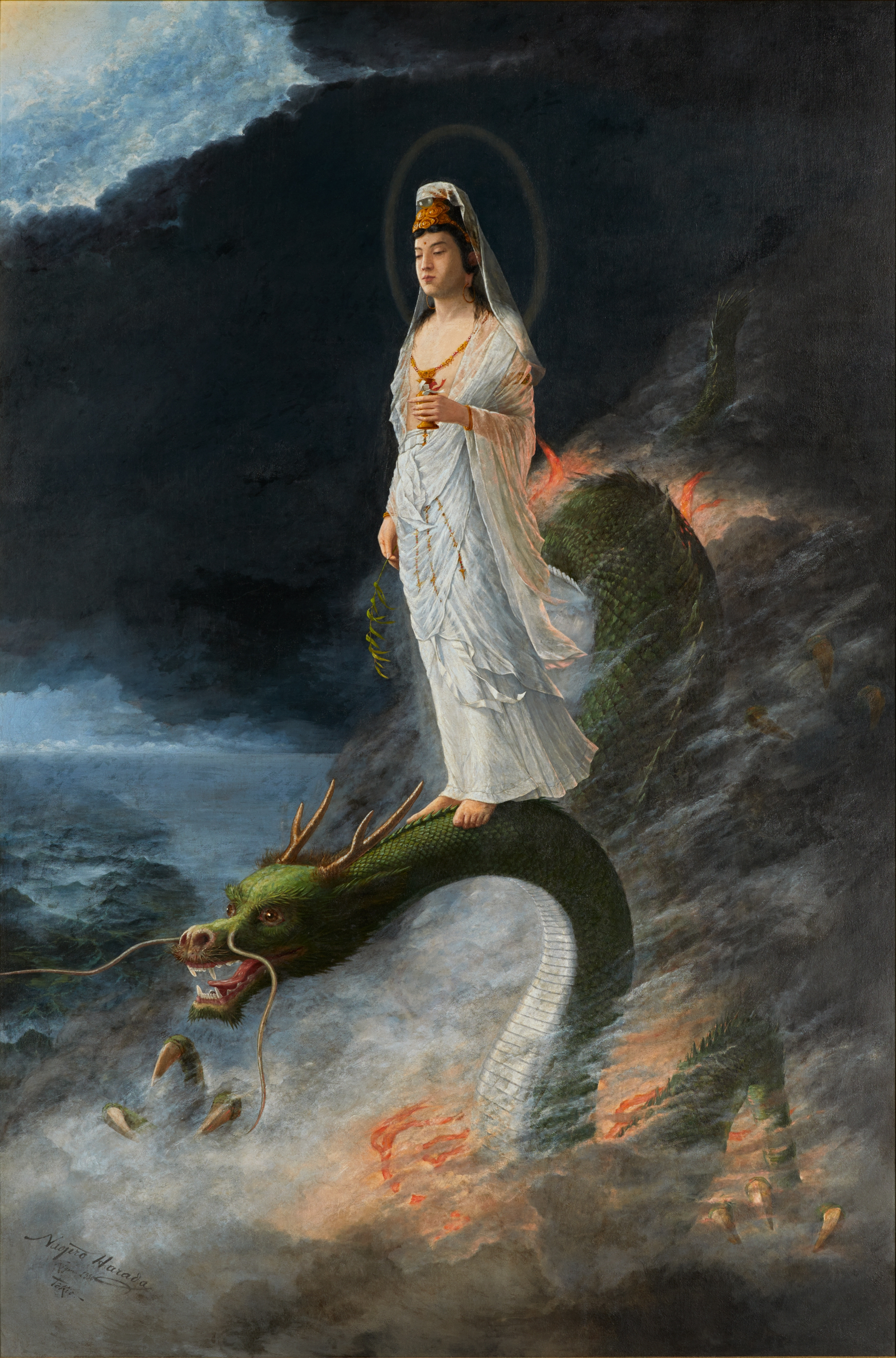
Kannon Riding a Dragon, 1890

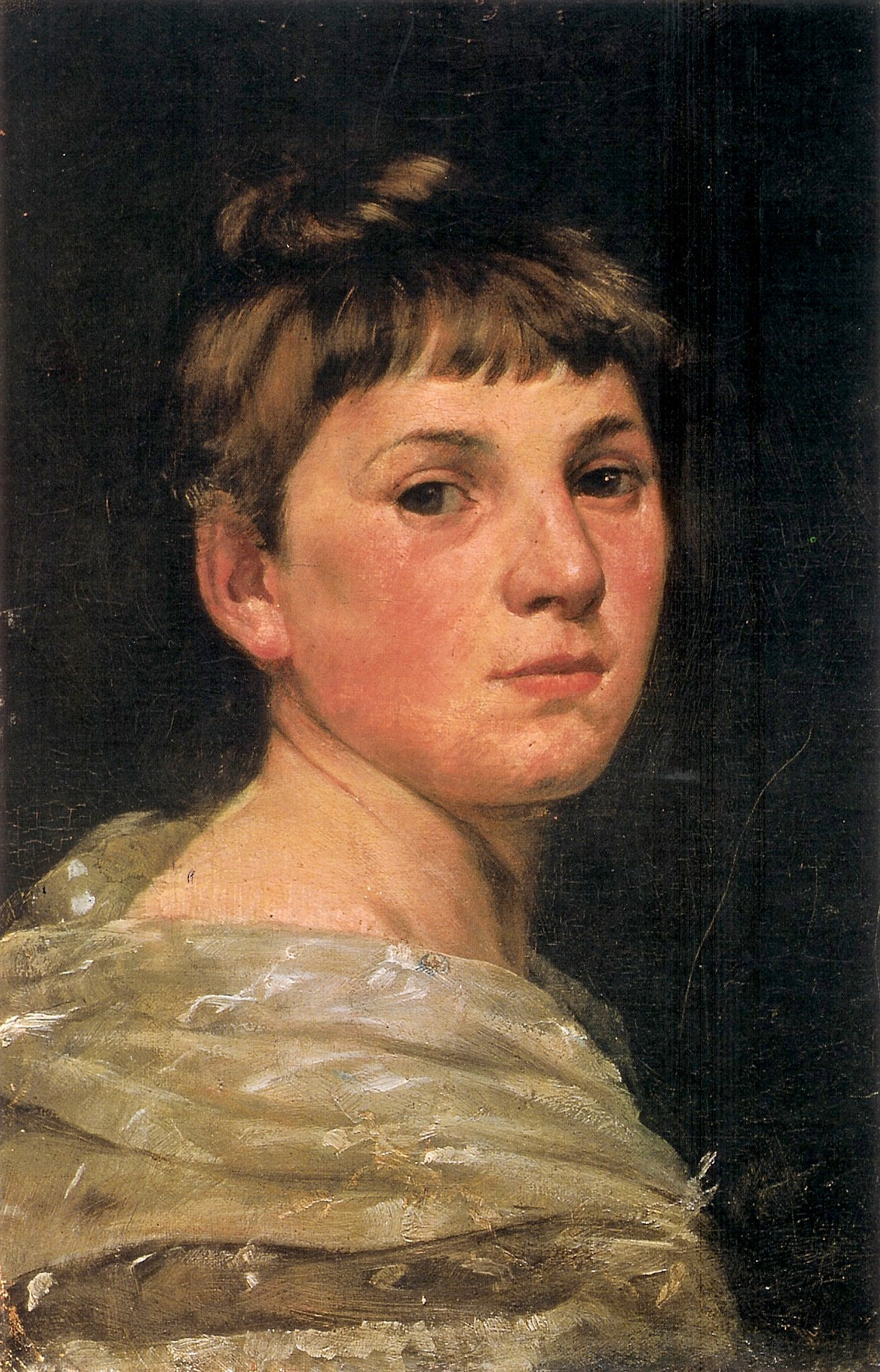
Girl

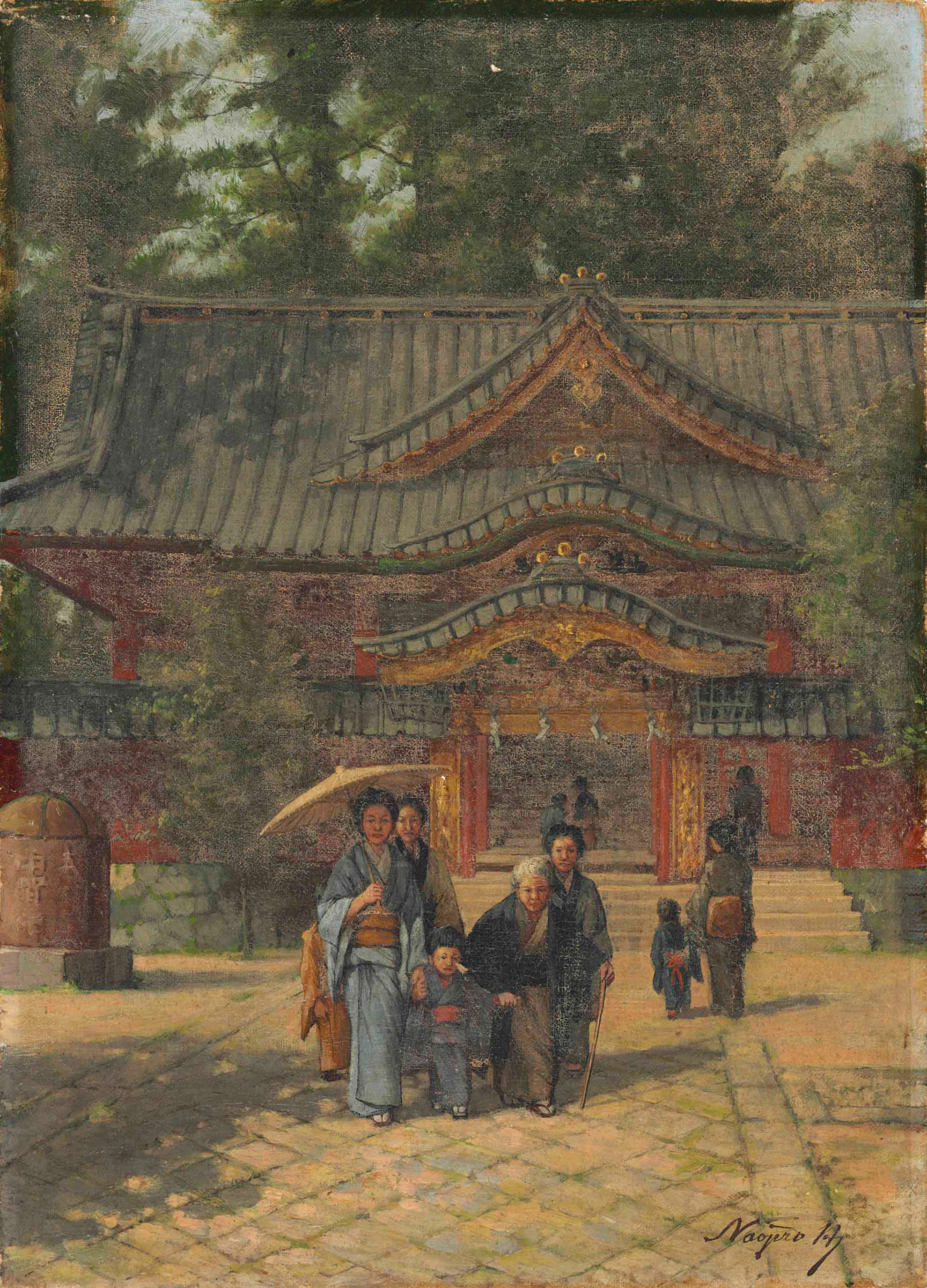
A Visit to Ueno Tōshō-gū Shrine

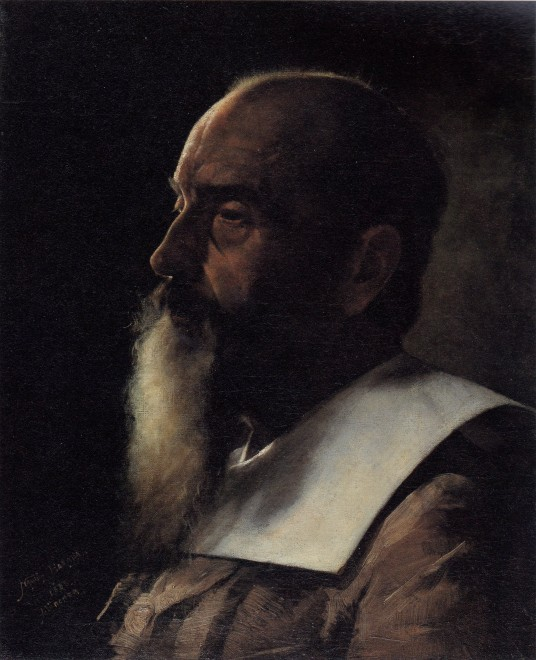
Father, 1885

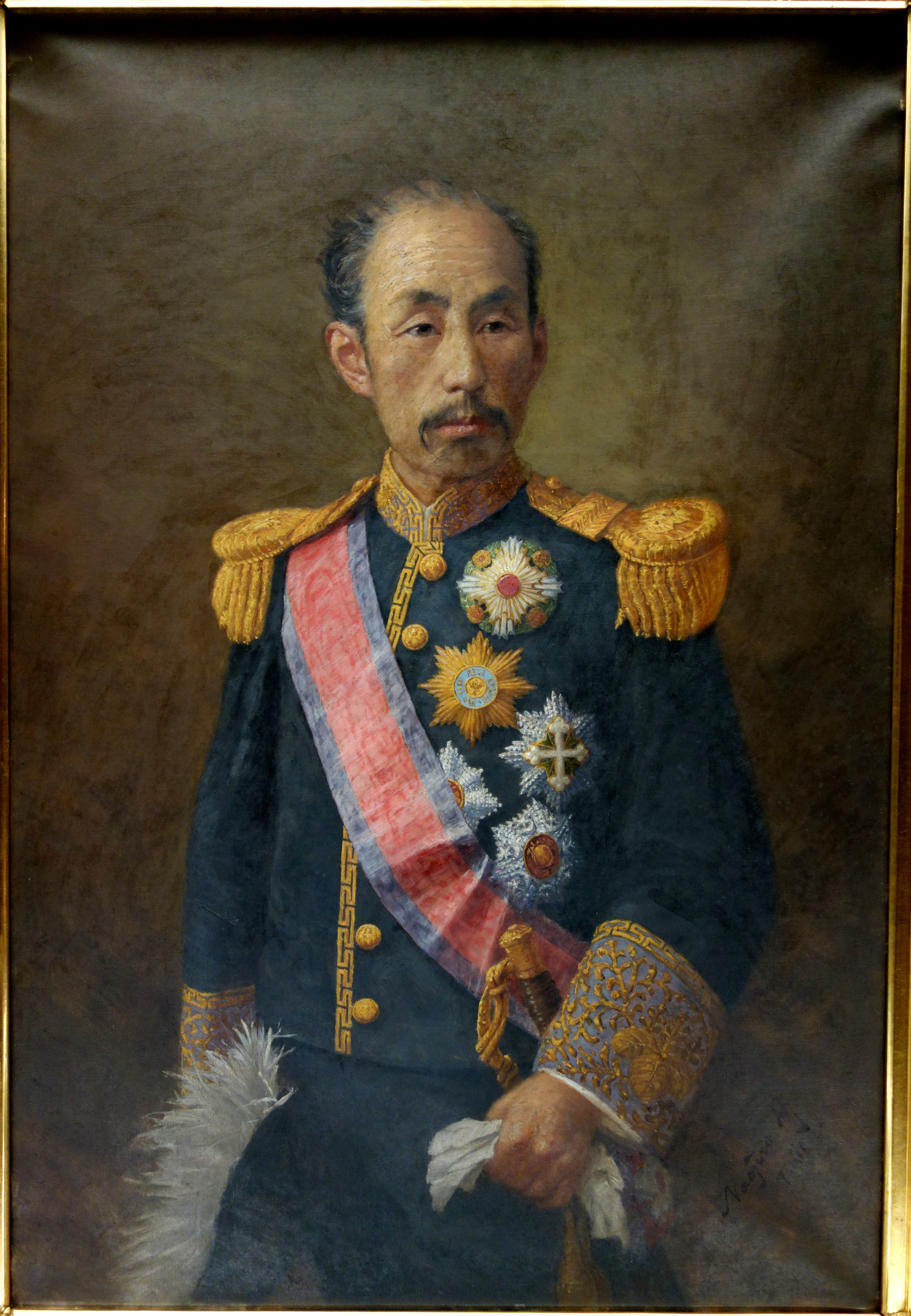
Portrait of Prince Sanjō Sanetomi

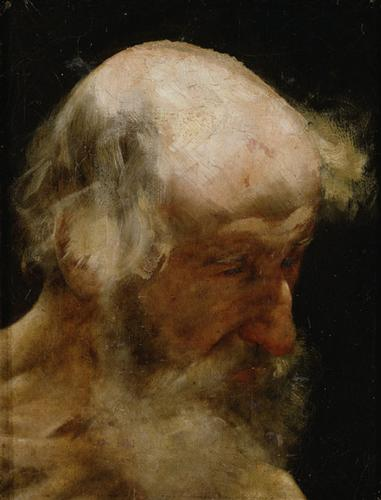
Old Man

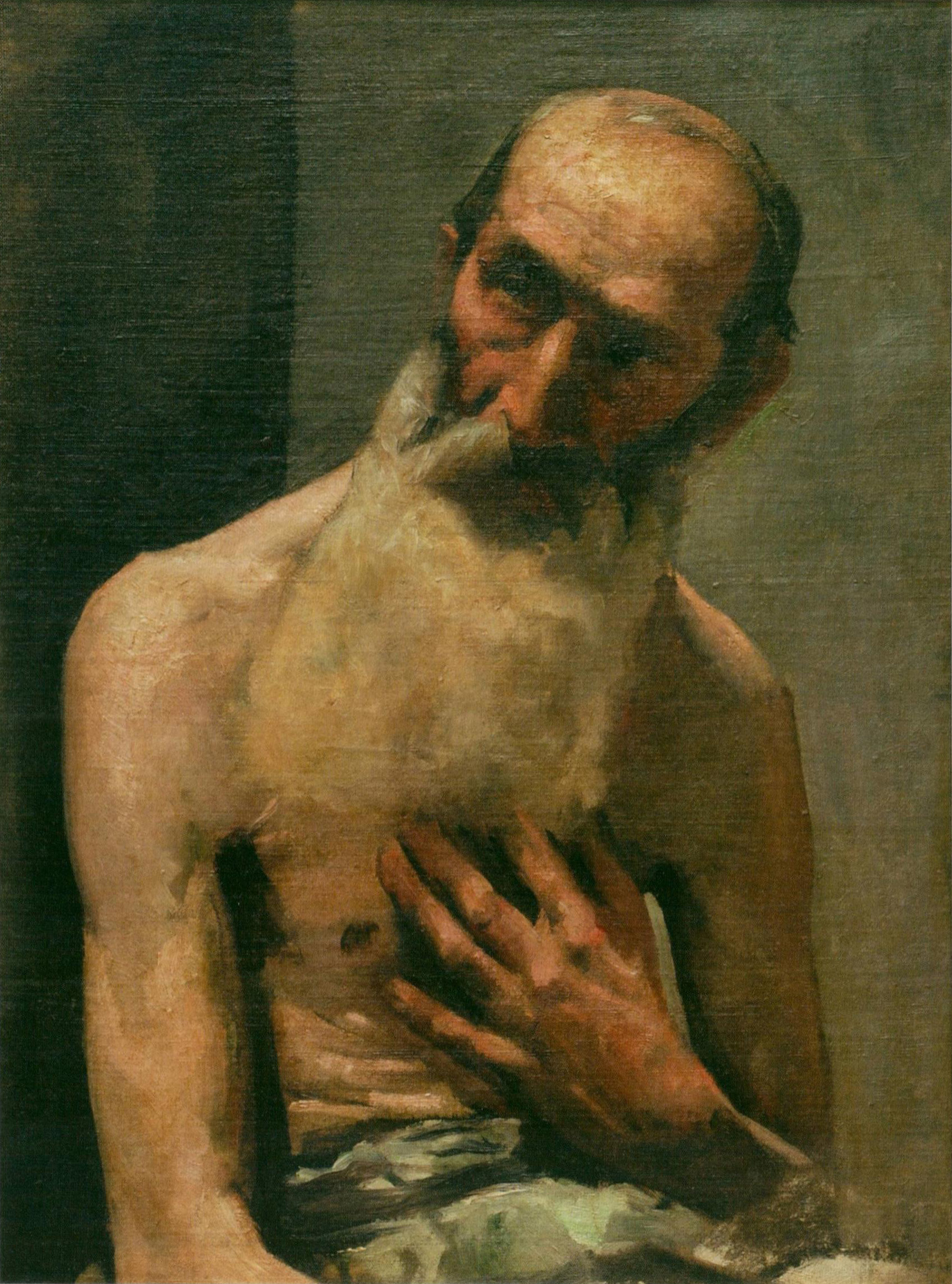
Old Man

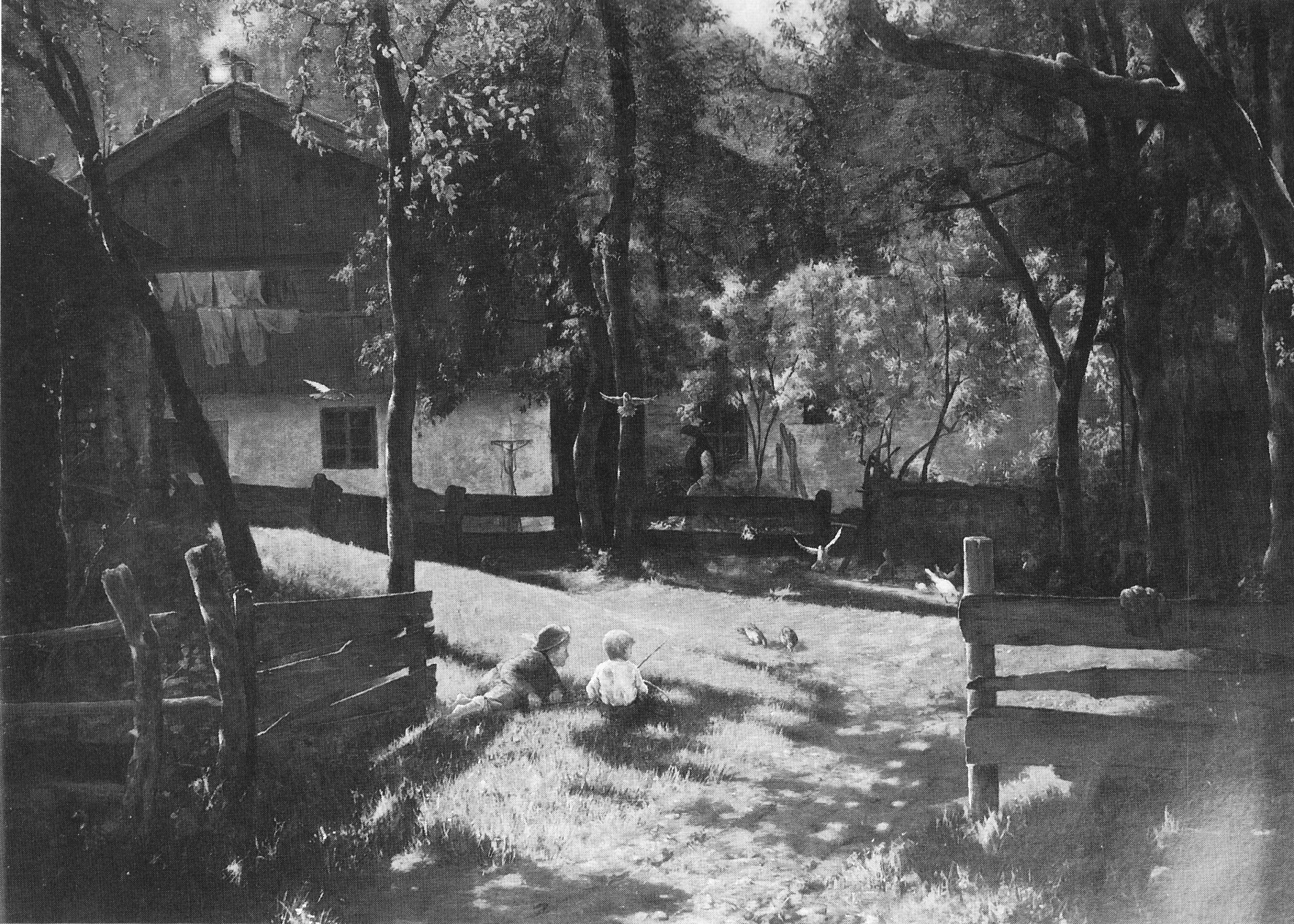
Garden

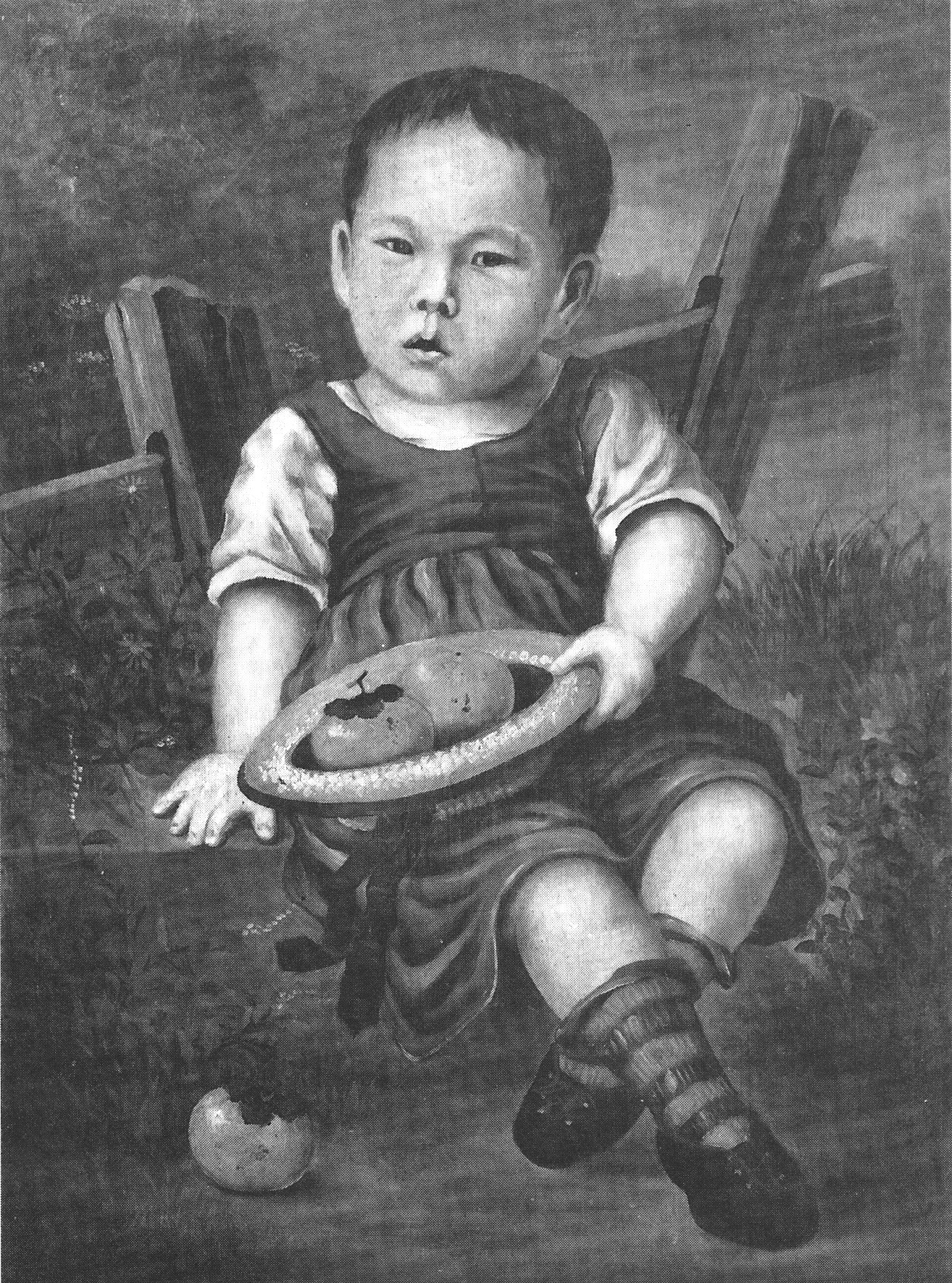
Child

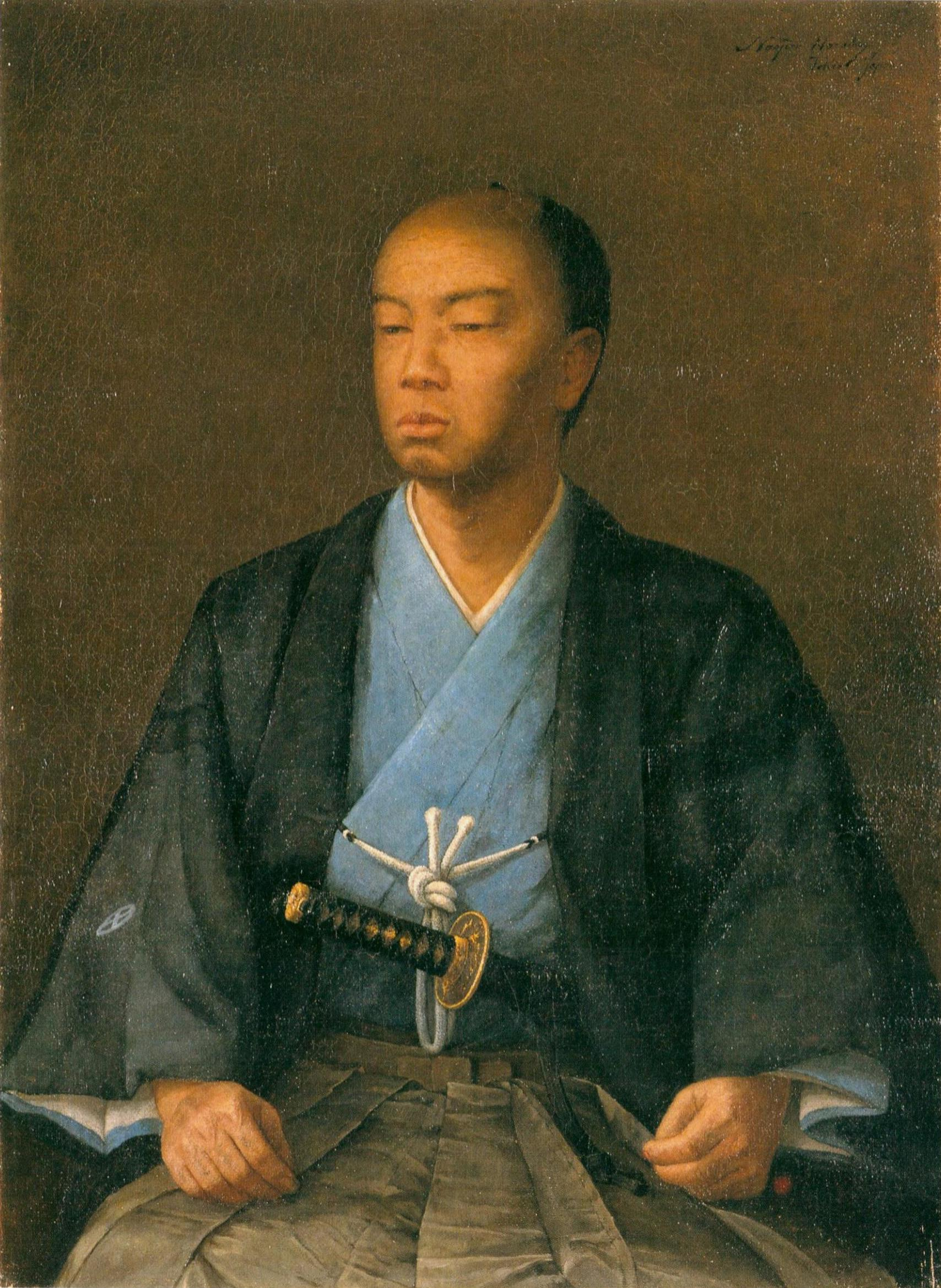
Portrait of Shimazu Hisamitsu

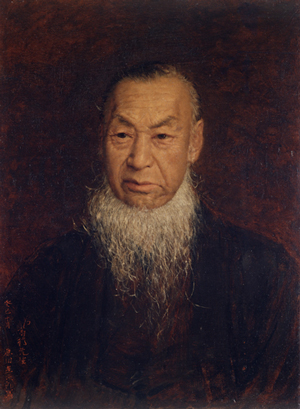
Portrait of Takahashi Yuichi
