= Ludwig des Coudres =

German painter

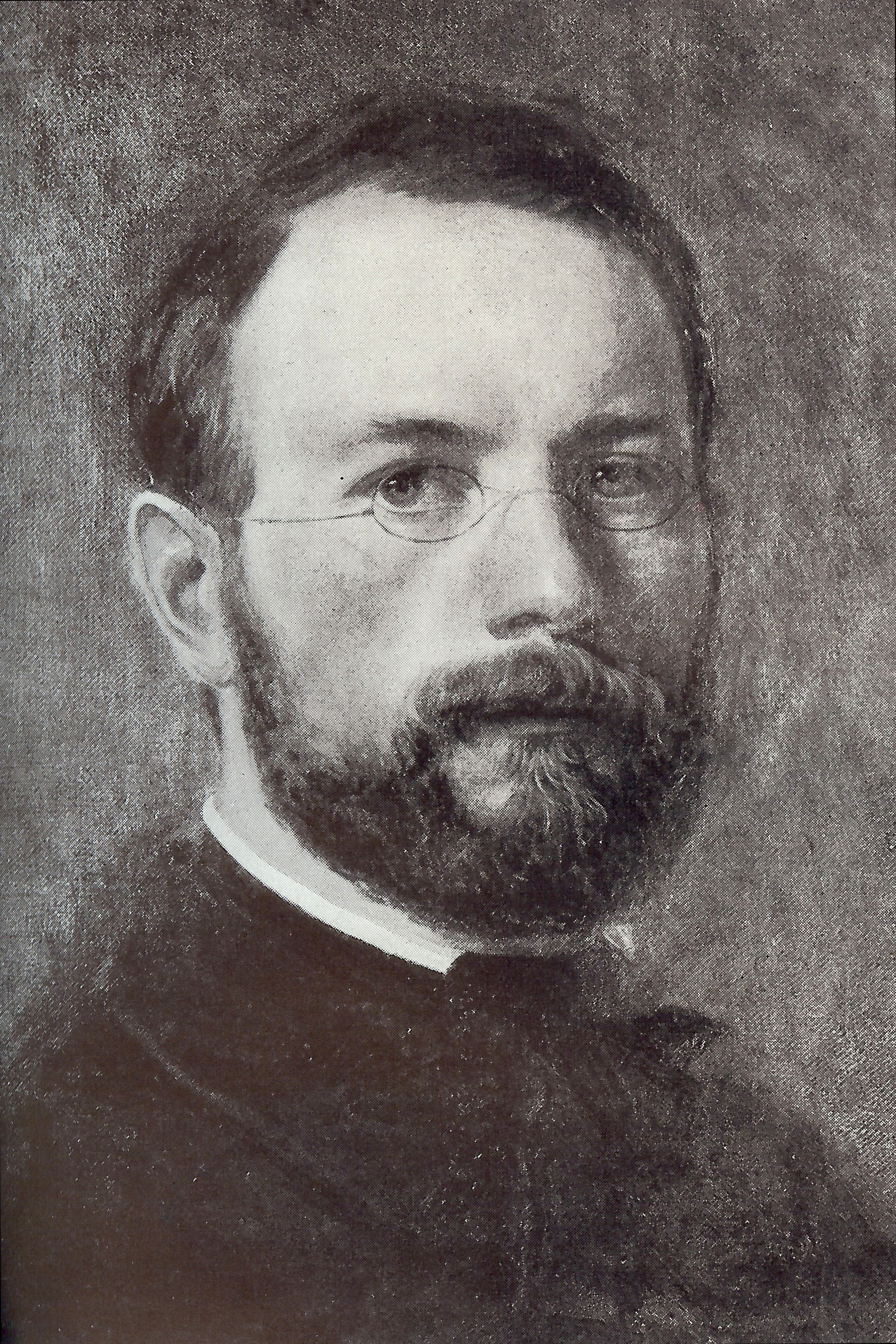
Self-portrait (c.1854)

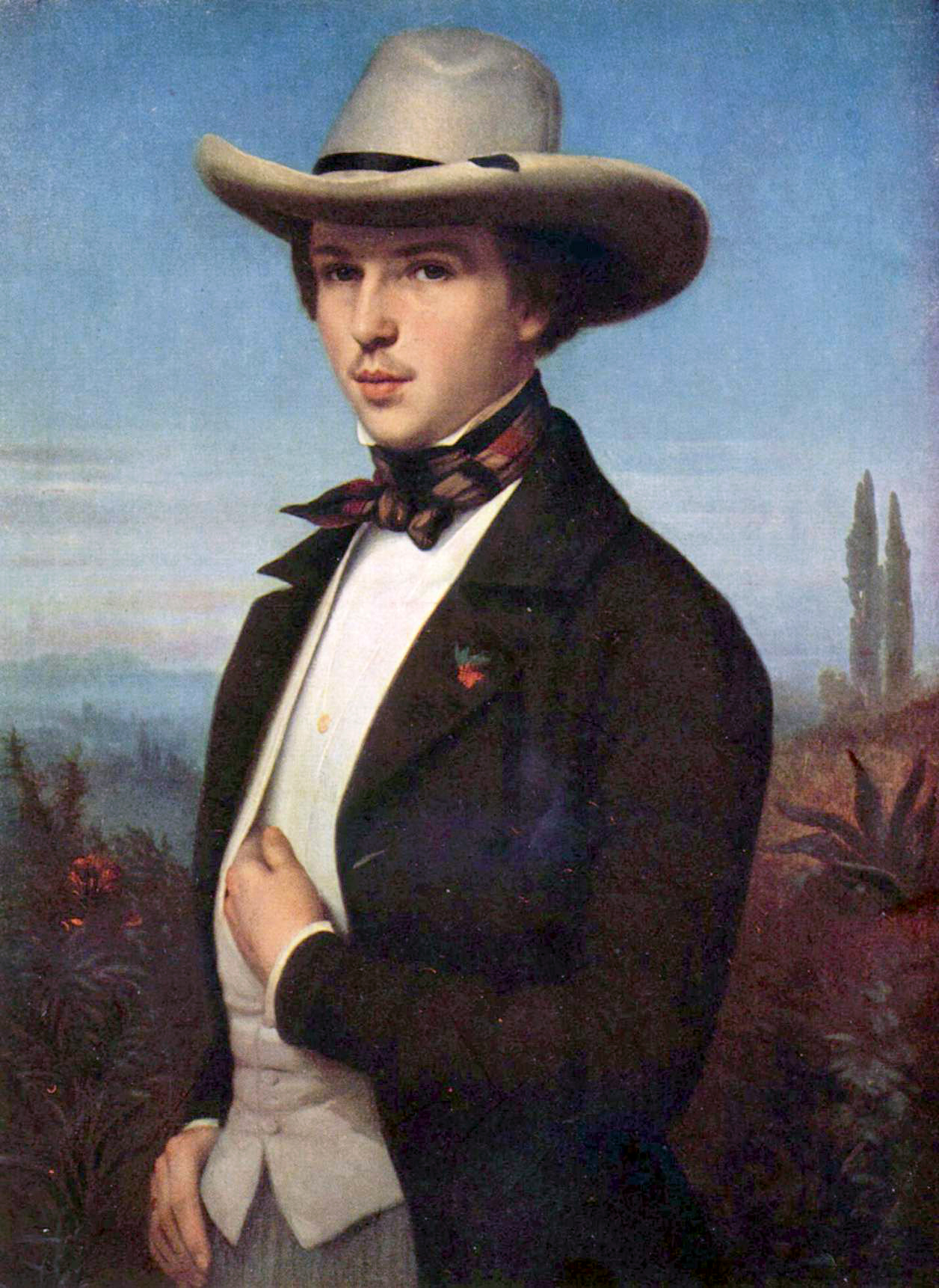
Portrait of Oswald Achenbach

Ludwig des Coudres (10 May 1820 – 23 December 1878) was a German history and portrait painter. He also served as a professor at the Academy of Fine Arts, Karlsruhe. His son, Adolf Des Coudres, was a well-known landscape painter.

== Biography ==
The Des Coudres family originated in Switzerland. Coudres was born in Kassel. His father was the third-generation owner of a tapestry factory and died when Ludwig was only two years old. A family friend, Ludwig Hummel (1770–1840), Director of the Kunsthochschule Kassel, inspired him to begin drawing and painting.

In 1836, he began studying architecture at the new polytechnic school. The following year, he was able to begin studies at the Kunsthochschule, where his teacher was Ludwig Emil Grimm. Dissatisfied with the school's emphasis on the Nazarene style, he and two of his friends left to start their own studio and teach themselves. Shortly after, he had a change of heart and went to study at the Academy of Fine Arts, Munich, with Julius Schnorr von Carolsfeld. In 1843, he went to spend two years in Rome. There, he befriended Johann Wilhelm Schirmer who advised him to study with Karl Ferdinand Sohn and Wilhelm von Schadow at the Kunstakademie Düsseldorf. It was there he turned to portrait painting.

In 1854, with Schirmer's recommendation, he became the first director of the academy in Karlsruhe, organizing its operations and establishing the curriculum. Four years later, he married Elise von Reck, the daughter of an Oberst from Baden. In 1863, he was the author of an important work on copyright protection.

The following year, a fall on the ice resulted in serious injuries. He died in 1878 in Karlsruhe, of an illness related to complications from the accident.

== Notable works ==
- Francesca da Rimini. 1850.
- The Weeping Magdalen. 1852.
- The Lamentation before the Burial (Carlsruhe Gallery). 1855.
- The Adoration of the Shepherds (in possession of the Grand-Duke of Baden). 1857
- The Holy Women before the Cross (in St. Nicholas, Hamburg). 1863.
- Iphigeneia (in possession of the Grand-Duke of Baden). 1865.
- Under the Red Cross. 1872.
- Psyche and Pan.
- Happy Existence – a child's picture.

== Sources ==
- "Ludwig des Coudres". Allgemeine Deutsche Biographie.
- Literature by and about Ludwig des Coudres in the German National Library catalogue

Attribution:
