= Karl Friedrich Lippmann =

German painter

Karl Friedrich Lippmann (also "Carl Fr. Lippmann" and "FK Lippmann"; 27 October 1883, in Offenbach am Main – 30 May 1957) was a German painter of the New Objectivity, known for landscapes and portraits.

== Life ==
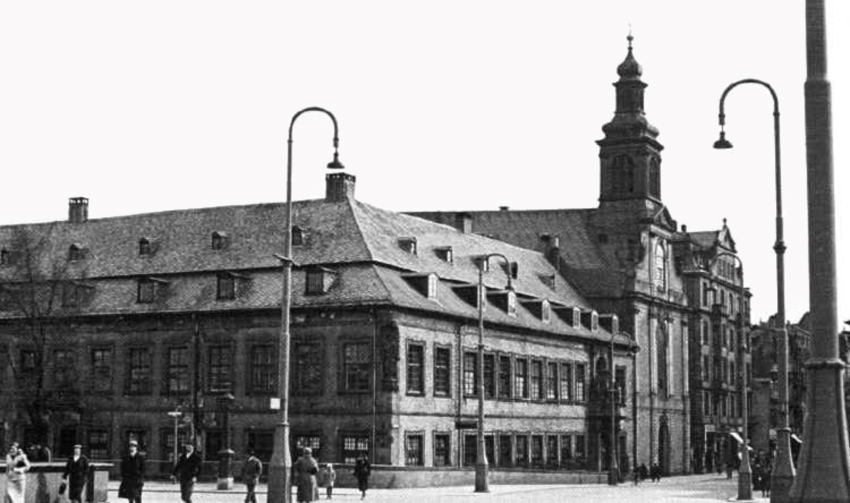
The Deutschordenhaus at the time when Lippmann had his studio there

Karl Friedrich Lippmann was of the three children of the painter, lithographer and print shop owner Johann Lippmann (1858 *, † 1933) and his wife, Frieda Schoembs. He studied at the Technical School (today Hochschule für Gestaltung Offenbach) 1900-02 and then at the School of the Museum of Decorative Arts in Berlin (the school merged later with Berlin University of the Arts). After his military service he continued his studies for three years at the private academy of Anton Ažbe in Munich, then he spend a year the Städelschule in Frankfurt (1906–07) and a year in the private school of Professor Julius Exter in Munich. There he fell in love with Martina Ruch, whom he later married, they had four children, of which his daughter also studied art

In Offenbach, he lived at Buchrainweg, No. 161. His large studio was located in the Deutschherrenhaus in Frankfurt on the river Main. After the destruction of his studio during WWII he moved to Eichstätt in Bavaria to save the life of his children. Eichstätt was the home town of his second wife, Berta Bahrer. His studio was located in the Crown Tower near the Cathedral square.

To come back to Offenbach, the art patron Dr. Jean Rill gave him an apartment in the Tulpenhofstr. in Westend. Two years after his return he died unexpectedly. He was buried in the Old Cemetery in Offenbach next to his father. His second wife was still alive until 1980 and is also buried there.

== Honors ==
In 1959, a street in Darmstadt was named Lippmann-Strasse in honor of Karl Friedrich Lippmann and his father

== Work ==
Lippmann created landscapes and portraits. His work was shown 1923 alongside Kandinsky, Kokoschka, Klee, Liebermann and Käthe Kollwitz at the Darmstadt Secession one of the most important contemporary exhibition of Expressionism. Inspired by numerous trips to France and Italy, but also to the North Sea and the Alps, he turned from to expressionistic landscape and flower paintings. In the Weimar Republic he was a recognized and famous painter. The gallery owner and art dealer Ludwig Schames sold one work of Lippmann to the art collectors Ludwig und Rosy Fischer. Between 1925 and 1935, famous from the arts and politics were portrayed by him, these pictures gave him the nickname "Master of portraiture". 44 of these now owns the Historical Museum Frankfurt, the Städel owns a landscape showing the Alps.

Lippmann received orders for murals in public buildings due to his congested order situation he hired fellow artists and students for them. From his monumental paintings have survived the Second World War only some drawings and photos.

He painted landscapes, still life (especially sunflower pictures) and photographed again, his architectural drawings were popular as newspaper and book illustrations. In Eichstädt he organized exhibitions, participated in exhibitions of the artist ring and went back to painting journeys. The last two years of his life he spent in Frankfurt. His works were shown at exhibitions again, and he traveled various times to Spain.

About 1200 works of Lippmann still exist, often privately owned. He signed his works in general, with "FK Lippmann", but dated them rarely.
