= Fürstenfeldbruck =

Town in Bavaria, Germany

- Town
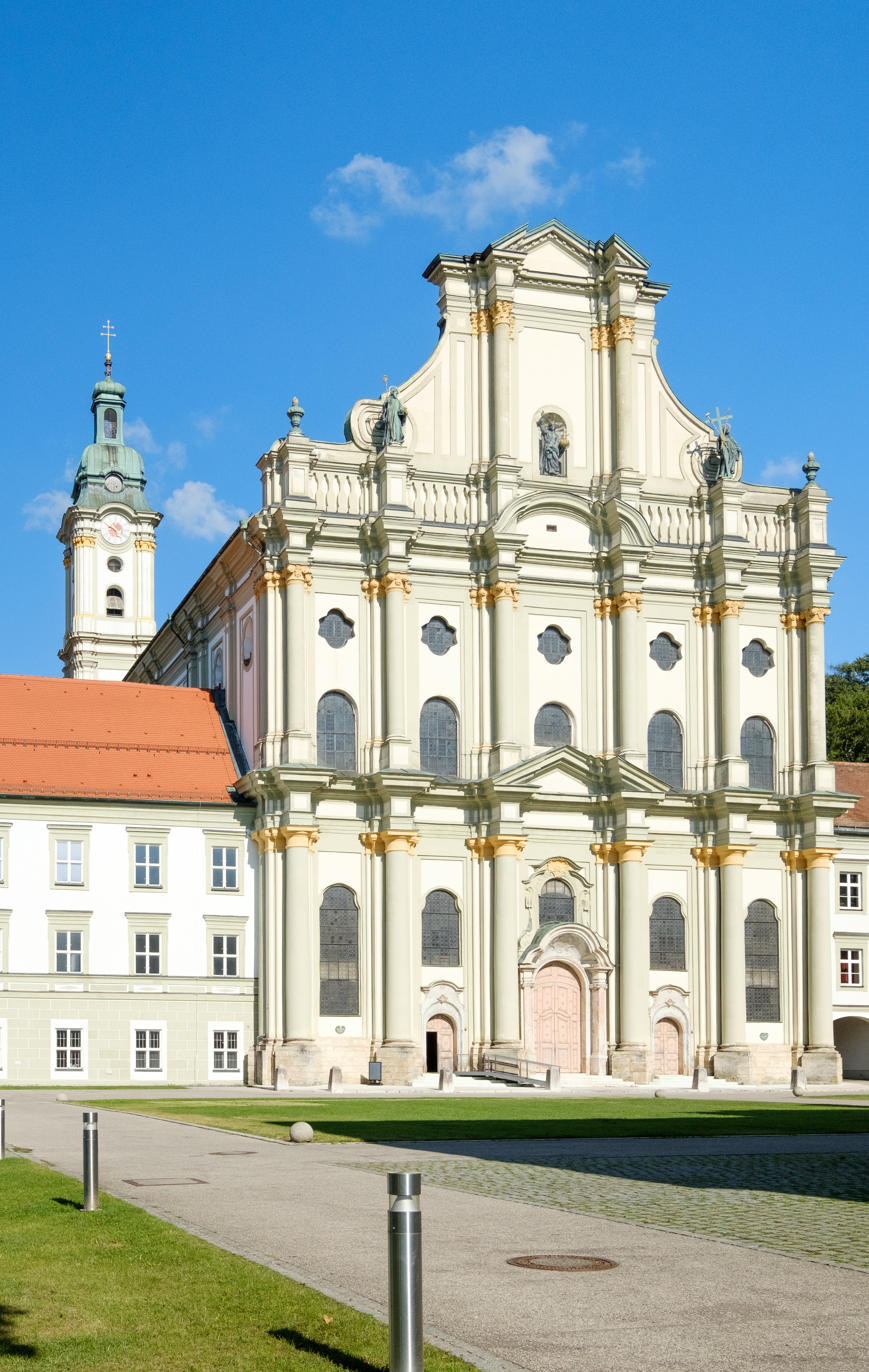
- Church of St. Mary (Fürstenfeld Abbey)

- Coat of arms

- Location of Fürstenfeldbruck within Fürstenfeldbruck district
- Interactive map of Fürstenfeldbruck
- Location within Germany Location within Bavaria
- Coordinates: 48°10′40″N 11°15′20″E
- Country: Germany
- State: Bavaria
- Admin. region: Oberbayern
- District: Fürstenfeldbruck

Government
  - Mayor (2023–29): Christian Götz

Area
  - Total: 32.53 km^{2} (12.56 sq mi)
- Elevation: 517 m (1,696 ft)

Population (2025-12-31)
  - Total: 37,666
  - Density: 1,158/km^{2} (2,999/sq mi)
- Time zone: UTC+01:00 (CET)
  - Summer (DST): UTC+02:00 (CEST)
- Postal codes: 82256
- Dialling codes: 08141
- Vehicle registration: FFB
- Website: www.fuerstenfeldbruck.de

Fürstenfeldbruck (German pronunciation: [fʏʁstn̩fɛltˈbʁʊk]) is a town in Bavaria, Germany, 32 kilometres west of Munich. It is the capital of the district of Fürstenfeldbruck. As of 2004 it had a population of 35,494. Since the 1930s Fürstenfeldbruck has had an air force base.

== Geography ==
Fürstenfeldbruck covers an area of 32.53 km^{2}. It is located halfway between Munich and Augsburg, and along the Amper river.

== Main sights ==
- Fürstenfeld Abbey, a Cistercian monastery founded in 1266 by Louis II, Duke of Bavaria and closed in 1803.

== Fürstenfeldbruck Air Base ==
Fürstenfeldbruck has been the site of an Air Base since 1936. It was used by the Luftwaffe before and during World War II. It was used by United States Air Force after World War II and returned to the German government in 1957 and used as a base for the German Air Force.

The air force base was the site of the Munich massacre during the 1972 Summer Olympics. The nine Israeli hostages (two had been killed earlier at the Olympic Village) and eight Black September terrorists who captured them were flown to the base from the Olympic Village via helicopter, where the terrorists demanded they, and their hostages, be flown to a friendly Arab nation. After a botched rescue attempt by Bavarian border guards and Munich police, the terrorists killed all of the nine remaining Israeli hostages, who were unable to escape from the helicopters. Five of the terrorists and a Munich policeman were also killed in the gunfight.

== Twin towns – sister cities ==
Fürstenfeldbruck is twinned with:

- Almuñécar, Spain
- Cerveteri, Italy
- Livry-Gargan, France
- Wichita Falls, United States
- Zadar, Croatia

== Notable people ==
- Karl Groß (1869–1934), German sculptor and goldsmith
- Ferdinand von Miller (1813–1887), iron moulder
- Adolf Des Coudres (1862–1924), landscape painter, died in Fürstenfeldbruck
- Richard W. Higgins (1922–1957), pilot, died preventing a plane crash over Fürstenfeldbruck
- Alexander Wesselsky (born 1968), singer and musician
