= Julius Exter =

German painter and sculptor

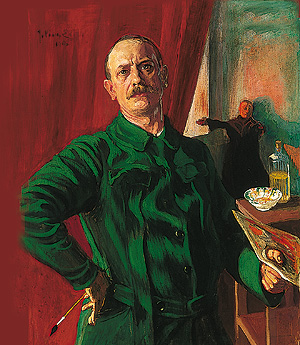
Self-portrait (date unknown)

Julius Leopold Bernhard Exter (20 September 1863 – 16 October 1939) was a German painter and sculptor. His work consists mostly of landscapes and portraits.

== Biography ==
He was born in Ludwigshafen to a family of merchants. His brother was architect August Exter. He began his education in Mannheim. In 1881, he enrolled at the Academy of Fine Arts, Munich, where he befriended Franz von Stuck. The two were introduced painting en plein air at the Osternberg artists colony in the early 1890s.

In 1898, he married the pianist and painter, Judith Anna Köhler (1868–1952); daughter of the Darmstadt art publisher, Karl Christian Köhler. Two of their children became artists; Judith (1900–1975, painter and sculptor) and Karl (1902–1982, painter and stage designer). They were divorced in 1917.

In 1892, he became one of the co-founders of the Munich Secession. In 1902, he purchased a farm in Chiemsee, where he opened a studio and painting school. That same year, he was appointed Titular Professor and became an honorary member of the Munich Academy. Later, he became associated with Franz Marc and Der Blaue Reiter. After his divorce, he returned to Munich. Among his best-known students were the sculptor, Eva Eisenlohr, and Karl Friedrich Lippmann.

He died at his home in Übersee in 1939, of heart failure. His daughter Judith donated his estate to the State of Bavaria in return for a life annuity. The home is now a museum and gallery. His works may also be seen at the Augustinian monastery in Herrenchiemsee.

== Selected paintings ==
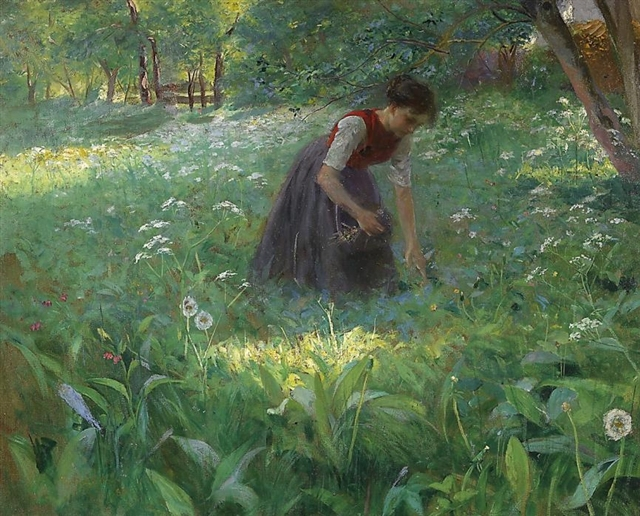
Leafy Forest in Summer

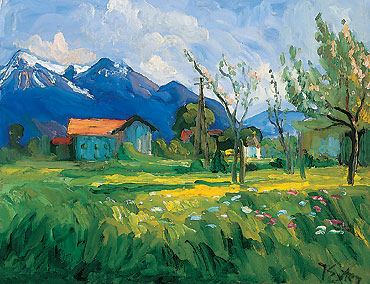
Spring

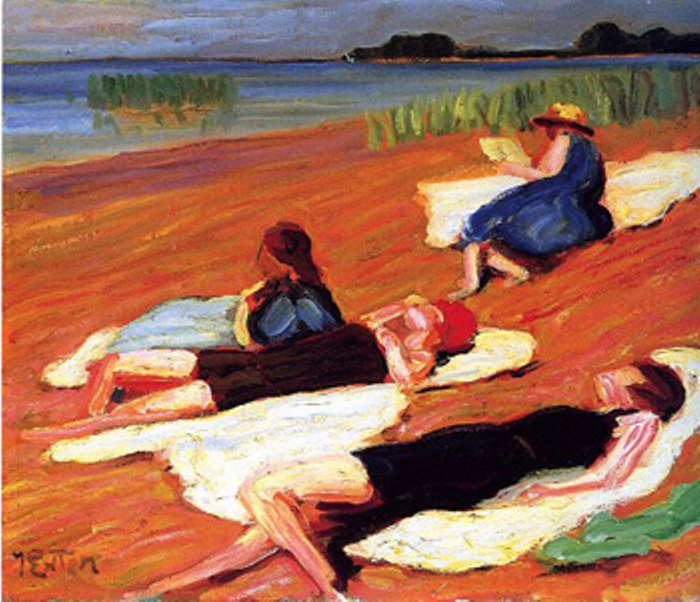
By the Lake

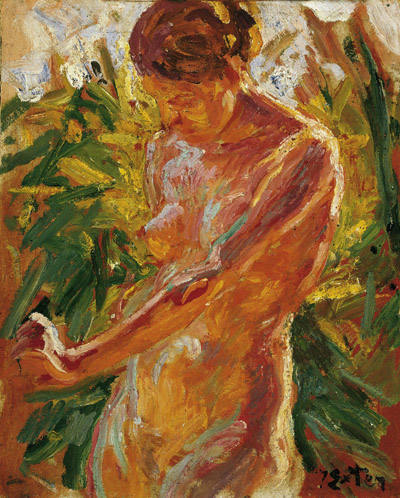
Female Nude

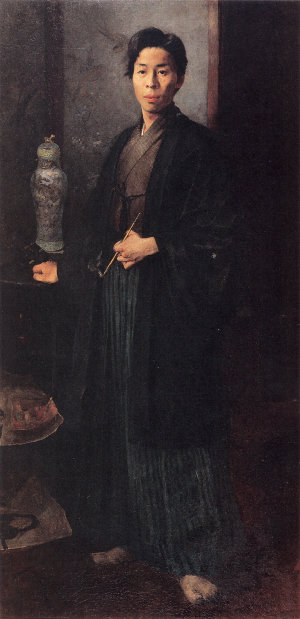
Portrait of a Japanese, depicting artist Harada Naojirō

== Sources ==
- Elmar D. Schmid: Julius Exter, 1883-1939. Unbekannte Werke aus dem Nachlass seiner Schülerin Olga Fritz-Zetter., Bayerische Schlösserverwaltung, ISBN 978-0-7062-0120-8
- Elmar D. Schmid: Julius Exter. Aufbruch in die Moderne. Klinkhardt & Biermann, 2000 ISBN 978-3-7814-0415-1.
- Elmar D. Schmid: Julius Exter. Freilichtmalerei. Beuroner Kunstverlag, 2005 ISBN 978-3-87071-127-6.
- Historisches Museum der Pfalz Speyer, Julius Exter (1863–1939). (exhibition catalog), Speyer, 2006 ISBN 978-3-930239-16-0.
