= Elise von Jung-Stilling =

Baltic German painter

- Born: Elise von Jung; 9 September 1829; Mītava (now Jelgava), Russian Empire (Now Latvia)
- Died: 7 October 1904 (aged 75); Riga, Russian Empire (Now Latvia)
- Known for: Painting, teaching

Elise von Jung-Stilling (German: Elise von Jung-Stilling, Latvian: Elīze Junga-Štilinga; 9 September 1829 – 10 July 1904) was a painter and the founder of a private painting school in Riga. She was also a cameralist, ophthalmologist and writer. She was the granddaughter of writer Johann Heinrich Jung.

== Biography ==
Eliza von Jung-Shilling was born on 9 September 1829 in Mītava (now Jelgava) in a Baltic-German family. In 1827 her father received the Russian hereditary nobility and in 1838 officiated as senior postmaster and state councilor in Riga. She took private lessons from the artist Julius Döring in Mitau, who himself studied at Dresden Academy of Painting, Sculpture, Engraving, and Architecture.

She worked as a schoolteacher in various educational institutions; during the summer holidays she took additional painting lessons in Dresden with A. Eberhard, Karlsbad and in Munich with A. Liezenmayer. From 1863 till 1895 she taught drawing at the Riga City Women's High School. In 1873 she founded a private school of drawing and painting, which received official status in 1879 under the name German: Jung-Stillingsche Zeichen- und Malschule. The school existed until her death in 1904. In 1906 on the basis of her painting school Riga City Art School was established. Together with her sister Amalie (1828-1905) who was pianist and music teacher, Elise von Jung-Stilling ran a hospitable home in Riga where socializing and musical activities were cultivated. Among the guests were u. a. Max Bruch, Richard Wagner and Klara Schumann.

Before 1871 Elise had in her possession the score — an autograph of the scene and aria for soprano "Non paventar, mia vita!" from Ines de Castro opera by Carl Maria von Weber, which she had probably received as a gift from Max Maria von Weber.
